= 2012 Clemson Tigers football team =

American college football season

2012 Clemson Tigers football

ACC Atlantic Division co-champion Chick-fil-A Bowl champion

Chick-fil-A Bowl, W 25–24 vs. LSU
- Conference: Atlantic Coast Conference
- Atlantic Division

Ranking
- Coaches: No. 9
- AP: No. 11
- Record: 11–2 (7–1 ACC)
- Head coach: Dabo Swinney (4th full, 5th overall season)
- Offensive coordinator: Chad Morris (2nd season)
- Offensive scheme: Spread
- Defensive coordinator: Brent Venables (1st season)
- Co-defensive coordinator: Charlie Harbison (5th season)
- Base defense: 4–3
- Home stadium: Memorial Stadium

2012 Atlantic Coast Conference football standings
	Conf.			Overall
Team	W		L	W		L
Atlantic Division
No. 10 Florida State xy$	7	–	1	12	–	2
No. 11 Clemson x	7	–	1	11	–	2
NC State	4	–	4	7	–	6
Wake Forest	3	–	5	5	–	7
Maryland	2	–	6	4	–	8
Boston College	1	–	7	2	–	10
Coastal Division
Georgia Tech xy	5	–	3	7	–	7
North Carolina†	5	–	3	8	–	4
Miami (FL)‡	5	–	3	7	–	5
Virginia Tech	4	–	4	7	–	6
Duke	3	–	5	6	–	7
Virginia	2	–	6	4	–	8
Championship: Florida State 21, Georgia Tech 15
$ – BCS representative as conference champion; x – Division champion/co-champions; y – Championship game participant; † North Carolina ineligible for ACC title, championship game, and bowl game due to NCAA sanctions. ‡ Miami ineligible for ACC title, championship game, and bowl game due to self-imposed sanctions.; Rankings from AP Poll

The 2012 Clemson Tigers football team represented Clemson University in the 2012 NCAA Division I FBS football season. The Tigers were led by head coach Dabo Swinney in his fourth full year and fifth overall since taking over midway through 2008 season. They played their home games at Memorial Stadium, also known as "Death Valley". They were members of the Atlantic Division of the Atlantic Coast Conference. On November 10, Clemson set a school record with their 12th straight home win at Death Valley. They finished the season 11–2, 7–1 in ACC play to be Atlantic Division co–champions with Florida State. Due to their loss to Florida State, they did not represent the division the ACC Championship Game. They were invited to the Chick-fil-A Bowl where they defeated LSU. The Tigers had their first 11-win season since 1981.

== Personnel ==
2012 Clemson Tigers football team roster
Players
Coaches
Offense

Pos.	#	Name	Class
WR	1	Martavis Bryant	So
WR	2	Sammy Watkins	So
WR	6	DeAndre Hopkins	Jr
QB	8	Cole Stoudt	So
QB	10	Tajh Boyd	Jr
QB	11	Chad Kelly	Fr
WR	16	Adam Humphries	So
WR	18	Jaron Brown	GS
WR	19	Charone Peake	So
RB	23	Andre Ellington	Sr
RB	24	Zac Brooks	Fr
C	55	Dalton Freeman	GS
G	62	Tyler Shatley	Jr
OT	63	Brandon Thomas	Jr
OT	79	Isaiah Battle	Fr
TE	80	Brandon Ford	Sr

Defense

Pos.	#	Name	Class
DE	3	Vic Beasley	So
DT	6	Tavaris Barnes	So
LB	12	Stephone Anthony	So
CB	17	Bashaud Breeland	So
CB	21	Darius Robinson	Jr
DT	48	D.J. Reader	Fr
DT	50	Grady Jarrett	So
DE	93	Corey Crawford	So
DT	94	Carlos Watkins	Fr
DT	97	Malliciah Goodman	Sr
DE	98	Kevin Dodd	Fr

Special teams

Pos.	#	Name	Class
K	39	Chandler Catanzaro	Jr
P	92	Bradley Pinion	Fr

Head coach

- Dabo Swinney

Coordinators/assistant coaches

- Chad Morris (OC/QB)
- Brent Venables (DC/LB)
- Tony Elliott (RB)
- Jeff Scott (WR/RC)
- Robbie Caldwell (OL)
- Dan Brooks (DT)
- Marion Hobby (DRGC/DE)
- Charlie Harbison (DB)
- Danny Pearman (STC/TE)
- Zac Alley (Student Asst.)

Legend

- (C) Team captain
- (S) Suspended
- (I) Ineligible
- Injured
- Redshirt

=== Coaching staff ===
Name	Position	Seasons at Clemson	Alma mater
Dabo Swinney	Head coach	3	Alabama (1992)
Chad Morris	Offensive coordinator/quarterbacks	1	Texas A&M (1992)
Brent Venables	Defensive coordinator/linebackers	0	Kansas State (1992)
Tony Elliott	Running Backs	1	Clemson (2003)
Jeff Scott	Wide Receivers/recruiting coordinator	3	Clemson (2002)
Robbie Caldwell	Offensive line	1	Furman (1976)
Dan Brooks	Defensive tackles	2	Western Carolina (1976)
Marion Hobby	Defensive Running game coordinator/Defensive Ends	1	Tennessee (1989)
Charlie Harbison	Defensive Backs	0	Gardner–Webb (1981)
Danny Pearman	Special Teams Coordinator/Tight Ends	3	Clemson (1995)
Zac Alley	Student Assistant	2	Clemson (2014)

== Schedule ==
Date	Time	Opponent	Rank	Site	TV	Result	Attendance
September 1	7:00 p.m.	vs. Auburn*	No. 14	Georgia Dome; Atlanta, GA (Chick-fil-A Kickoff Game / rivalry)	ESPN	W 26–19	75,211
September 8	12:30 p.m.	Ball State*	No. 12	Memorial Stadium; Clemson, SC	ACCN	W 52–27	79,557
September 15	3:00 p.m.	Furman*	No. 11	Memorial Stadium; Clemson, SC	RSN	W 41–7	83,574
September 22	8:00 p.m.	at No. 4 Florida State	No. 10	Doak Campbell Stadium; Tallahassee, FL (rivalry) (College GameDay)	ABC	L 37–49	83,231
September 29	3:30 p.m.	at Boston College	No. 17	Alumni Stadium; Chestnut Hill, MA (O'Rourke–McFadden Trophy)	ESPN2	W 45–31	40,138
October 6	3:30 p.m.	Georgia Tech	No. 15	Memorial Stadium; Clemson, SC (rivalry)	ESPN	W 47–31	82,873
October 20	Noon	Virginia Tech	No. 14	Memorial Stadium; Clemson, SC	ABC/ESPN2	W 38–17	83,338
October 25	7:30 p.m.	at Wake Forest	No. 14	BB&T Field; Winston-Salem, NC	ESPN	W 42–13	31,162
November 3	7:00 p.m.	at Duke	No. 10	Wallace Wade Stadium; Durham, NC	ESPN2	W 56–20	31,894
November 10	3:30 p.m.	Maryland^{†}	No. 10	Memorial Stadium; Clemson, SC	ESPNU	W 45–10	78,302
November 17	3:30 p.m.	NC State	No. 11	Memorial Stadium; Clemson, SC (Textile Bowl)	ABC/ESPN2	W 62–48	77,831
November 24	7:00 p.m.	No. 13 South Carolina*	No. 12	Memorial Stadium; Clemson, SC (Palmetto Bowl)	ESPN	L 17–27	84,513
December 31	7:30 p.m.	vs. No. 9 LSU*	No. 14	Georgia Dome; Atlanta, GA (Chick-fil-A Bowl)	ESPN	W 25–24	68,027
*Non-conference game; ^{†}Homecoming; Rankings from AP Poll released prior to the game; All times are in Eastern time

== Depth chart ==
Defense

FS
Xavier Brewer
Garry Peters

WLB	MLB	SLB
⋅	Stephone Anthony	⋅
Travis Blanks	Spencer Shuey	⋅

SS
Jonathan Meeks
Rashard Hall

CB
Bashaud Breeland
Cortez Davis

DE	DT	DT	DE
Corey Crawford (American Football)	Grady Jarrett	Deshawn Williams	Malliciah Goodman
Vic Beasley	Tavaris Barnes	Josh Watson	Roderick Byers

CB
Darius Robinson
Martin Jenkins

Offense

WR
DeAndre Hopkins
Martavis Bryant

WR
Jaron Brown
Charone Peake

LT	LG	C	RG	RT
Brandon Thomas	Kalon Davis	Dalton Freeman	Tyler Shatley	Gifford Timothy
Isaiah Battle	David Beasley	Ryan Norton	Reid Webster	Joe Gore

TE
Brandon Ford
Sam Cooper

WR
Sammy Watkins
Adam Humphries

QB
Tajh Boyd
Cole Stoudt

Key reserves

Special teams
PK Chandler Catanzaro
P Spencer Benton
KR Sammy Watkins
PR DeAndre Hopkins
LS Michael Sobeski
H Dawson Zimmerman

RB
Andre Ellington
DJ Howard

=== Recruiting class ===
College recruiting (2012)
Name	Hometown	School	Height	Weight	Commit date
Carlos Watkins; DT	Forest City, North Carolina	Chase High School	6 ft 4 in (1.93 m)	290 lb (130 kg)	-
Carlos Watkins; DT	Recruit ratings: Scout: Rivals: 247Sports: ESPN:				
Germone Hopper; WR	Charlotte, North Carolina	Phillip O. Berry Academy	5 ft 11 in (1.80 m)	175 lb (79 kg)	—
Germone Hopper; WR	Recruit ratings: Scout: Rivals: 247Sports: ESPN:				
Travis Blanks; S	Tallahassee, Florida	North Florida Christian High School	6 ft 1 in (1.85 m)	195 lb (88 kg)	—
Travis Blanks; S	Recruit ratings: Scout: Rivals: 247Sports: ESPN:				
Chad Kelly; QB	Buffalo, New York	St. Joseph School	6 ft 3 in (1.91 m)	205 lb (93 kg)	
Chad Kelly; QB	Recruit ratings: Scout: Rivals: 247Sports: ESPN:				
Zac Brooks; RB	Jonesboro, Arkansas	Jonesboro H.S.	6 ft 1 in (1.85 m)	180 lb (82 kg)	—
Zac Brooks; RB	Recruit ratings: Scout: Rivals: 247Sports: ESPN:				
Ronald Geohaghan; S	Fairfax, South Carolina	Allendale Fairfax High School	6 ft 1 in (1.85 m)	190 lb (86 kg)	—
Ronald Geohaghan; S	Recruit ratings: Scout: Rivals: 247Sports: ESPN:				
Martin Aiken; DE	Bamberg, South Carolina	Bamberg Ehrhardt	6 ft 3 in (1.91 m)	240 lb (110 kg)	-
Martin Aiken; DE	Recruit ratings: Scout: Rivals: 247Sports: ESPN:				
D. J. Reader; OL	Greensboro, North Carolina	Grimsley	6 ft 3 in (1.91 m)	330 lb (150 kg)	—
D. J. Reader; OL	Recruit ratings: Scout: Rivals: 247Sports: ESPN:				
Jay Guillermo; C	Maryville, Tennessee	Maryville H.S.	6 ft 3 in (1.91 m)	285 lb (129 kg)	—
Jay Guillermo; C	Recruit ratings: Scout: Rivals: 247Sports: ESPN:				
Patrick DeStefano; OL	Roebuck, South Carolina	Dorman H.S.	6 ft 5 in (1.96 m)	285 lb (129 kg)	—
Patrick DeStefano; OL	Recruit ratings: Scout: Rivals: 247Sports: ESPN:				
Isaiah Battle; OL	Fork Union, Virginia	Fork Union Military Academy	6 ft 7 in (2.01 m)	260 lb (120 kg)	—
Isaiah Battle; OL	Recruit ratings: Scout: Rivals: 247Sports: ESPN:				
Oliver Jones; OL	Ninety Six, South Carolina	Ninety Six H.S.	6 ft 6 in (1.98 m)	300 lb (140 kg)	—
Oliver Jones; OL	Recruit ratings: Scout: Rivals: 247Sports: ESPN:				
Kevin Dodd; DT	Chatham, Virginia	Hargrave Military Academy	6 ft 5 in (1.96 m)	280 lb (130 kg)	—
Kevin Dodd; DT	Recruit ratings: Scout: Rivals: 247Sports: ESPN:				
TJ Burrell; LB	Goose Creek, South Carolina	Goose Creek H.S.	6 ft 1 in (1.85 m)	205 lb (93 kg)	—
TJ Burrell; LB	Recruit ratings: Scout: Rivals: 247Sports: ESPN:				
Cordrea Tankersley; ATH	Aiken, South Carolina	Silver Bluff H.S.	6 ft 3 in (1.91 m)	262 lb (119 kg)	—
Cordrea Tankersley; ATH	Recruit ratings: Scout: Rivals: 247Sports: ESPN:				
Shaq Lawson; DE	Central, South Carolina	D. W. Daniel	6 ft 4 in (1.93 m)	255 lb (116 kg)	—
Shaq Lawson; DE	Recruit ratings: Scout: Rivals: 247Sports: ESPN:				
Marty Williams; S	North Augusta, South Carolina	Fox Creek H.S.	6 ft 2 in (1.88 m)	205 lb (93 kg)	—
Marty Williams; S	Recruit ratings: Scout: Rivals: 247Sports: ESPN:				
Jay Jay McCullough; ATH	Fort Mill, South Carolina	Foc Creek Charter	6 ft 4 in (1.93 m)	230 lb (100 kg)	—
Jay Jay McCullough; ATH	Recruit ratings: Scout: Rivals: 247Sports: ESPN:				
Bradley Pinion; K	Concord, North Carolina	Northwest Cabarrus	6 ft 6 in (1.98 m)	220 lb (100 kg)	—
Bradley Pinion; K	Recruit ratings: Scout: Rivals: 247Sports: ESPN:				
Overall recruit ranking: Scout: 17 Rivals: 14 247Sports: 15 ESPN: 10
‡ Refers to 40-yard dash; Note: In many cases, Scout, Rivals, 247Sports, On3, and ESPN may conflict in their listings of height, weight and 40 time.; In these cases, the average was taken. ESPN grades are on a 100-point scale.; Sources: "2012 Team Ranking". Rivals.com.

== Game summaries ==
=== Auburn ===
	1	2	3	4	Total
#25 Auburn	7	3	6	3	19
#14 Clemson	3	10	3	10	26

=== Ball State ===
	1	2	3	4	Total
Cardinals	7	3	10	7	27
#12 Tigers	13	32	0	7	52

=== Furman ===
	1	2	3	4	Total
Paladins	0	7	0	0	7
#11 Tigers	7	13	14	7	41

=== Florida State ===
	1	2	3	4	Total
#10 Tigers	14	7	10	6	37
#4 Seminoles	7	7	21	14	49

=== Boston College ===
	1	2	3	4	Total
#17 Tigers	10	14	14	7	45
Eagles	7	14	7	3	31

=== Georgia Tech ===
	1	2	3	4	Total
Yellow Jackets	14	7	7	3	31
#3 Tigers	10	17	3	17	47

=== Virginia Tech ===
	1	2	3	4	Total
Hokies	7	3	0	7	17
#14 Tigers	3	14	14	7	38

=== Wake Forest ===
	1	2	3	4	Total
#14 Tigers	7	28	0	7	42
Demon Deacons	0	7	6	0	13

=== Duke ===
	1	2	3	4	Total
#10 Tigers	28	14	7	7	56
Blue Devils	10	7	3	0	20

=== Maryland ===
	1	2	3	4	Total
Terrapins	0	7	3	0	10
#110 Tigers	21	14	3	7	45

=== NC State ===
NC State Wolfpack (6–4) at #9 Clemson Tigers (9–1)

Quarter	1	2	3	4	Total
NC State	21	3	14	10	48
Clemson	13	28	21	0	62

at Memorial Stadium • Clemson, South Carolina

- Date: November 17
- Game time: 3:30 p.m. EDT
- Game weather: Sunny • 57 °F (14 °C) • Wind E 9 miles per hour (14 km/h; 7.8 kn)
- Game attendance: 76,000
- Referee: J. Magallanes
- TV announcers (ABC/ESPN2): Mike Patrick, Ed Cunningham, Jeannine Edwards
- Box Score

Game information

NC State

- Mike Glennon
  29/53, 493 Yds, 5 TD, INT
- Shadrach Thornton
  21 Rush, 114 Yds, TD
- Tobais Palmer
  7 Rec, 219 Yds, 3 TD

Clemson

- Tajh Boyd
  30/44, 426 Yds, 5 TD, 2 INT
- Andre Ellington
  22 Rush, 124 Yds
- Sammy Watkins
  11 Rec, 110 Yds, TD

Scoring summary

Quarter	Time	Drive			Team	Scoring information	Score	
Quarter	Time	Plays	Yards	TOP	Team	Scoring information	NCST	CLEM
1	12:56	9	46	2:04	Clemson	46-yard field goal by Chandler Catanzaro	0	3
1	9:54	9	66	2:21	Clemson	Tajh Boyd 4-yard touchdown run, Chandler Catanzaro kick good	0	10
1	7:31	6	25	1:35	Clemson	43-yard field goal by Chandler Catanzaro	0	13
1	7:13	1	77	0:13	NC State	Tobais Palmer 77-yard touchdown reception from Mike Glennon, Niklas Sade kick good	7	13
1	6:19	1	49	0:09	NC State	Tobais Palmer 49-yard touchdown reception from Mike Glennon, Niklas Sade kick good	14	13
1	1:36	9	81	2:49	NC State	Rashard Smith 18-yard touchdown reception from Mike Glennon, Niklas Sade kick good	21	13
2	14:17	5	19	1:24	NC State	32-yard field goal by Niklas Sade	24	13
2	12:52	8	78	1:21	Clemson	Brandon Ford 7-yard touchdown reception from Tajh Boyd, 2-point pass failed	24	19
2	10:28	4	59	0:33	Clemson	Sammy Watkins 27-yard touchdown reception from Tajh Boyd, 2-point pass good	24	27
2	2:22	5	80	1:23	Clemson	DeAndre Hopkins 62-yard touchdown reception from Tajh Boyd, Chandler Catanzaro kick good	24	34
2	1:14	4	32	0:53	Clemson	Tajh Boyd 9-yard touchdown run, Chandler Catanzaro kick good	24	41
3	11:00	4	68	1:02	Clemson	Martavis Bryant 40-yard touchdown reception from Tajh Boyd, Chandler Catanzaro kick good	24	48
3	4:13	10	74	2:58	Clemson	Tajh Boyd 9-yard touchdown run, Chandler Catanzaro kick good	24	55
3	3:55	1	16	0:06	NC State	Shadrach Thornton 16-yard touchdown run, Niklas Sade kick good	31	55
3	2:38	1	6	0:06	NC State	Mario Carter 6-yard touchdown reception from Mike Glennon, Niklas Sade kick good	38	55
3	1:39	3	75	0:59	Clemson	Brandon Ford 69-yard touchdown reception from Tajh Boyd, Chandler Catanzaro kick good	38	62
4	14:20	10	56	2:11	NC State	Tobais Palmer 29-yard touchdown reception from Mike Glennon, Niklas Sade kick good	45	62
4	7:35	13	63	3:22	NC State	40-yard field goal by Niklas Sade	48	62
"TOP" = time of possession. For other American football terms, see Glossary of American football.							48	62

=== vs No. 12 South Carolina (rivalry) ===
Game Twelve– No. 12 South Carolina Gamecocks (9-2) at No. 11 Clemson Tigers (10-1) – Game summary

Quarter	1	2	3	4	Total
No. 12 South Carolina	7	3	10	7	27
No. 11 Clemson	14	0	3	0	17

at Memorial Stadium • Clemson, South Carolina

- Date: Saturday, November 24, 2012
- Game time: 7:00 p.m. EST
- Game weather: Temperature: • Wind: • Weather: Clear
- Game attendance: 82,000
- TV announcers (ESPN): Joe Tessitore, Matt Millen, Shannon Spake

Game information

First quarter

- (5:27) CLEM – Tajh Boyd 3-yard run (Chandler Catanzaro kick) (Drive: 16 plays, 85 yards, 6:14; Clemson 7-0)
- (1:46) SC – Bruce Ellington 13-yard pass from Dylan Thompson (Adam Yates kick) (Drive: 7 plays, 63 yards, 3:41; Tied 7-7)
- (1:22) CLEM – DeAndre Hopkins 43-yard pass from Tajh Boyd (Chandler Catanzaro kick) (Drive: 2 plays, 75 yards, 0:24; Clemson 14-7)

Second quarter

- (2:40) SC – Adam Yates 27-yard field goal (Drive: 12 plays, 79 yards, 6:14; Clemson 14-10)

Third quarter

- (11:48) SC – Ace Sanders 34-yard pass from Dylan Thompson (Adam Yates kick) (Drive: 10 plays, 85 yards, 3:12; South Carolina 17-14)
- (6:56) SC – Adam Yates 43-yard field goal (Drive: 8 plays, 42 yards, 3:08; South Carolina 20-14)
- (5:07) CLEM – Chandler Catanzaro 37-yard field goal (Drive: 6 plays, 56 yards, 1:49; South Carolina 20-17)

Fourth quarter

- (4:17) SC – Bruce Ellington 6-yard pass from Dylan Thompson (Adam Yates kick) (Drive: 13 plays, 65 yards, 7:39; South Carolina 27-17)

Statistics	SC	CLEM
First downs	26	18
Total yards	86–444	59–328
Rushing yards	45–134	35–145
Passing yards	310	183
Passing: Comp–Att–Int	23–41–1	11–24–2
Time of possession	39:34	20:02

Team	Category	Player	Statistics
South Carolina	Passing	Dylan Thompson	23/41, 310 yards, 3 TD, INT
South Carolina	Rushing	Kenny Miles	16 carries, 45 yards
South Carolina	Receiving	Ace Sanders	6 receptions, 119 yards, TD
Clemson	Passing	Tajh Boyd	11/24, 183 yards, TD, 2 INT
Clemson	Rushing	Andre Ellington	15 carries, 72 yards
Clemson	Receiving	Jaron Brown	3 receptions, 68 yards

=== LSU (Chick-Fil-A Bowl) ===
	1	2	3	4	Total
#15 Clemson	7	6	0	12	25
#9 LSU	7	7	10	0	24

== Rankings ==
Ranking movements Legend: ██ Increase in ranking ██ Decrease in ranking
	Week															
Poll	Pre	1	2	3	4	5	6	7	8	9	10	11	12	13	14	Final
AP	14	12	11	10	17	15	16	14	14	10	10	11	12	15	14	11
Coaches	14	12	11	9	16	15	13	13	13	9	8	9	9	14	13	9
Harris	Not released						14	13	13	9	9	9	9	14	13	Not released
BCS	Not released							19	18	13	13	11	11	14	14	Not released

== 2013 NFL draft ==
Clemson had four players selected in the 2013 NFL draft. DeAndre Hopkins went in the first round as the 27th overall pick.

Player	Team	Round	Pick #	Position
DeAndre Hopkins	Houston Texans	1st	27th	WR
Malliciah Goodman	Atlanta Falcons	4th	127th	DE
Jonathan Meeks	Buffalo Bills	4th	143rd	DB
Andre Ellington	Arizona Cardinals	6th	187th	RB
