= 2014 Clemson Tigers football team =

American college football season

2014 Clemson Tigers football

Russell Athletic Bowl champion

Russell Athletic Bowl, W 40–6 vs. Oklahoma
- Conference: Atlantic Coast Conference
- Atlantic Division

Ranking
- Coaches: No. 15
- AP: No. 15
- Record: 10–3 (6–2 ACC)
- Head coach: Dabo Swinney (6th full, 7th overall season)
- Offensive coordinator: Chad Morris (4th season)
- Offensive scheme: Spread
- Defensive coordinator: Brent Venables (3rd season)
- Base defense: 4–3
- Captains: Stephone Anthony; Sam Cooper; Adam Humphries; Grady Jarrett
- Home stadium: Memorial Stadium

2014 Atlantic Coast Conference football standings
	Conf.			Overall
Team	W		L	W		L
Atlantic Division
No. T–5 Florida State x$^	8	–	0	13	–	1
No. 15 Clemson	6	–	2	10	–	3
No. 24 Louisville	5	–	3	9	–	4
Boston College	4	–	4	7	–	6
NC State	3	–	5	8	–	5
Syracuse	1	–	7	3	–	9
Wake Forest	1	–	7	3	–	9
Coastal Division
No. 8 Georgia Tech x	6	–	2	11	–	3
Duke	5	–	3	9	–	4
North Carolina	4	–	4	6	–	7
Pittsburgh	4	–	4	6	–	7
Miami (FL)	3	–	5	6	–	7
Virginia Tech	3	–	5	7	–	6
Virginia	3	–	5	5	–	7
Championship: Florida State 37, Georgia Tech 35
^ – College Football Playoff participant; $ – Conference champion; x – Division champion/co-champions; Rankings from AP Poll

The 2014 Clemson Tigers football team represented Clemson University in the 2014 NCAA Division I FBS football season. The Tigers were led by head coach Dabo Swinney in his sixth full year and seventh overall since taking over midway through the 2008 season. They played their home games at Memorial Stadium, also known as "Death Valley." They were members of the Atlantic Division of the Atlantic Coast Conference. They finished the season 10–3, 6–2 in ACC play to finish in second place in the Atlantic Division. They were invited to the Russell Athletic Bowl where they defeated Oklahoma.

== Personnel ==
=== Coaching staff ===
Name	Position	Seasons at Clemson	Alma mater
Dabo Swinney	Head coach	7	Alabama (1992)
Chad Morris	Offensive coordinator/quarterbacks	3	Texas A&M (1992)
Brent Venables	Defensive coordinator/linebackers	2	Kansas State (1992)
Jeff Scott	Wide receivers/recruiting coordinator/co-offensive coordinator	5	Clemson (2002)
Tony Elliott	Running backs/co-offensive coordinator	3	Clemson (2003)
Robbie Caldwell	Offensive line	3	Furman (1976)
Dan Brooks	Defensive tackles	4	Western Carolina (1976)
Marion Hobby	Defensive running game coordinator/defensive ends	5	Tennessee (1989)
Michael Reed	Defensive backs	1	Boston College (1994)
Danny Pearman	Special teams coordinator/tight ends	5	Clemson (1995)
Zac Alley	Student assistant	4	Clemson (2014)

== Schedule ==
Date	Time	Opponent	Rank	Site	TV	Result	Attendance
August 30	5:30 p.m.	at No. 12 Georgia*	No. 16	Sanford Stadium; Athens, GA (rivalry)	ESPN	L 21–45	92,746
September 6	12:30 p.m.	South Carolina State*	No. 23	Memorial Stadium; Clemson, SC	ACCN	W 73–7	81,672
September 20	8:00 p.m.	at No. 1 Florida State	No. 22	Doak Campbell Stadium; Tallahassee, FL (rivalry) (College GameDay)	ABC	L 17–23 ^{OT}	82,316
September 27	7:00 p.m.	North Carolina		Memorial Stadium; Clemson, SC	ESPNU	W 50–35	79,155
October 4	3:30 p.m.	NC State		Memorial Stadium; Clemson, SC (Textile Bowl)	ESPNU	W 41–0	78,459
October 11	3:30 p.m.	Louisville		Memorial Stadium; Clemson, SC	ESPNU	W 23–17	81,500
October 18	3:30 p.m.	at Boston College	No. 24	Alumni Stadium; Chestnut Hill, MA (Battle for the O'Rourke–McFadden Trophy)	ESPNU	W 17–13	42,038
October 25	7:00 p.m.	Syracuse^{†}	No. 21	Memorial Stadium; Clemson, SC	ESPNU	W 16–6	80,031
November 6	7:30 p.m.	at Wake Forest	No. 21	BB&T Field; Winston-Salem, NC	ESPN	W 34–20	28,846
November 15	Noon	at No. 22 Georgia Tech	No. 19	Bobby Dodd Stadium; Atlanta, GA (rivalry)	ESPN	L 6–28	49,378
November 22	3:30 p.m.	Georgia State*	No. 22	Memorial Stadium; Clemson, SC	ACCRSN	W 28–0	77,693
November 29	Noon	South Carolina*	No. 21	Memorial Stadium; Clemson, SC (Palmetto Bowl)	ESPN	W 35–17	82,720
December 29	5:30 p.m.	vs. Oklahoma*	No. 17	Orlando Citrus Bowl Stadium; Orlando, FL (Russell Athletic Bowl)	ESPN	W 40–6	40,071
*Non-conference game; ^{†}Homecoming; Rankings from AP Poll and CFP Rankings after October 28 released prior to game; All times are in Eastern time

== Depth chart ==
Defense

FS
Jayron Kearse
Jadar Johnson

WLB	MLB	SLB
⋅	Stephone Anthony	⋅
Travis Blanks	B.J. Goodson	⋅

SS
Robert Smith (safety)
T. J. Green

CB
Mackensie Alexander
Garry Peters

DE	DT	DT	DE
Corey Crawford	Grady Jarrett	Josh Watson	Vic Beasley
Tavaris Barnes	Carlos Watkins	D. J. Reader	Shaq Lawson

CB
Cordrea Tankersley
Martin Jenkins

Offense

WR
Adam Humphries
Artavis Scott

WR
Mike Williams
Demarre Kitt

LT	LG	C	RG	RT
Isaiah Battle	David Beasley	Ryan Norton	Kalon Davis	Joe Gore
Shaq Anthony	Eric Mac Lain	Jay Guillermo	Tyrone Crowder	Shaq Anthony

TE
Sam Cooper
Jordan Leggett

WR
Charone Peake
Kyrin Priester

QB
Cole Stoudt
Deshaun Watson

Key reserves

Special teams
PK Ammon Lakip
P Bradley Pinion
KR Charone Peake
PR Adam Humphries
LS Michael Sobeski
H Corbin Jenkins

RB
DJ Howard
Zac Brooks

=== Recruiting class ===
College recruiting (2014)
Name	Hometown	School	Height	Weight	Commit date
Deshaun Watson; QB	Gainesville, Georgia	Gainesville H.S.	6 ft 3 in (1.91 m)	200 lb (91 kg)	-
Deshaun Watson; QB	Recruit ratings: Scout: Rivals: 247Sports: ESPN:				
Artavis Scott; WR	Tarpon Springs, Florida	East Lake High School	5 ft 10 in (1.78 m)	175 lb (79 kg)	—
Artavis Scott; WR	Recruit ratings: Scout: Rivals: 247Sports: ESPN:				
Trevion Thompson; WR	Durham, North Carolina	Hillside High School	6 ft 3 in (1.91 m)	188 lb (85 kg)	—
Trevion Thompson; WR	Recruit ratings: Scout: Rivals: 247Sports: ESPN:				
Korie Rogers; LB	Buford, Georgia	Buford High School	6 ft 1 in (1.85 m)	210 lb (95 kg)	
Korie Rogers; LB	Recruit ratings: Scout: Rivals: 247Sports: ESPN:				
Demarre Kitt; WR	Tyrone, Georgia	Sandy Creek	6 ft 1 in (1.85 m)	185 lb (84 kg)	—
Demarre Kitt; WR	Recruit ratings: Scout: Rivals: 247Sports: ESPN:				
Richard Yeargin III; LB	Fort Lauderdale, Florida	University School	6 ft 4 in (1.93 m)	225 lb (102 kg)	—
Richard Yeargin III; LB	Recruit ratings: Scout: Rivals: 247Sports: ESPN:				
Adam Choice; ATH	Thomasville, Georgia	Thomas County Central	5 ft 9 in (1.75 m)	206 lb (93 kg)	-
Adam Choice; ATH	Recruit ratings: Scout: Rivals: 247Sports: ESPN:				
Cannon Smith; TE	Columbia, South Carolina	Hammond School	6 ft 5 in (1.96 m)	235 lb (107 kg)	—
Cannon Smith; TE	Recruit ratings: Scout: Rivals: 247Sports: ESPN:				
Chris Register; LB	Greensboro, North Carolina	Dudley H.S.	6 ft 4 in (1.93 m)	235 lb (107 kg)	—
Chris Register; LB	Recruit ratings: Scout: Rivals: 247Sports: ESPN:				
Kyrin Priester; WR	Fork Union, Virginia	Fork Union Military Academy	6 ft 3 in (1.91 m)	185 lb (84 kg)	—
Kyrin Priester; WR	Recruit ratings: Scout: Rivals: 247Sports: ESPN:				
Milan Richard; TE	Savannah, Georgia	Calvary Day School	6 ft 2 in (1.88 m)	232 lb (105 kg)	—
Milan Richard; TE	Recruit ratings: Scout: Rivals: 247Sports: ESPN:				
Justin Falcinelli; OT	Middletown, Maryland	Middletown H.S.	6 ft 3 in (1.91 m)	290 lb (130 kg)	—
Justin Falcinelli; OT	Recruit ratings: Scout: Rivals: 247Sports: ESPN:				
Kendall Joseph; LB	Honea Path, South Carolina	Belton Honea Path H.S.	6 ft 1 in (1.85 m)	228 lb (103 kg)	—
Kendall Joseph; LB	Recruit ratings: Scout: Rivals: 247Sports: ESPN:				
Jefferie Gibson; S	Hope Mills, North Carolina	Gray's Creek H.S.	6 ft 4 in (1.93 m)	190 lb (86 kg)	—
Jefferie Gibson; S	Recruit ratings: Scout: Rivals: 247Sports: ESPN:				
Taylor Hearn; OT	Williston, South Carolina	Williston Elko H.S.	6 ft 5 in (1.96 m)	305 lb (138 kg)	—
Taylor Hearn; OT	Recruit ratings: Scout: Rivals: 247Sports: ESPN:				
C. J. Fuller; CB + RB	Easley, South Carolina	Easley H.S.	5 ft 10 in (1.78 m)	200 lb (91 kg)	—
C. J. Fuller; CB + RB	Recruit ratings: Scout: Rivals: 247Sports: ESPN:				
Alex Spence; K	Florence, South Carolina	West Florence H.S.	6 ft 2 in (1.88 m)	190 lb (86 kg)	—
Alex Spence; K	Recruit ratings: Scout: Rivals: 247Sports: ESPN:				
Jabril Robinson; DT	Leland, North Carolina	North Brunswick H.S.	6 ft 3 in (1.91 m)	265 lb (120 kg)	—
Jabril Robinson; DT	Recruit ratings: Scout: Rivals: 247Sports: ESPN:				
Jalen Williams; LB	Central, South Carolina	D.W. Daniel	5 ft 11 in (1.80 m)	220 lb (100 kg)	—
Jalen Williams; LB	Recruit ratings: Scout: Rivals: 247Sports: ESPN:				
Jae'lon Oglesby; RB	Central, South Carolina	D.W. Daniel High School	6 ft 0 in (1.83 m)	175 lb (79 kg)	—
Jae'lon Oglesby; RB	Recruit ratings: Scout: Rivals: 247Sports: ESPN:				
Overall recruit ranking: Scout: 28 Rivals: 13 247Sports: 17 ESPN: 12
‡ Refers to 40-yard dash; Note: In many cases, Scout, Rivals, 247Sports, On3, and ESPN may conflict in their listings of height, weight and 40 time.; In these cases, the average was taken. ESPN grades are on a 100-point scale.; Sources: "2014 Team Ranking". Rivals.com.

== Game summaries ==
=== Georgia ===
	1	2	3	4	Total
Tigers	7	14	0	0	21
Bulldogs	14	7	3	21	45

=== South Carolina State ===
	1	2	3	4	Total
Bulldogs	0	0	0	7	7
Tigers	10	24	24	15	73

=== Florida State ===
	1	2	3	4	OT	Total
Tigers	0	10	0	7	0	17
Seminoles	3	0	7	7	6	23

=== North Carolina ===
	1	2	3	4	Total
Tar Heels	0	7	14	14	35
Tigers	10	12	14	14	50

=== NC State ===
	1	2	3	4	Total
Wolfpack	0	0	0	0	0
Tigers	21	10	10	0	41

=== Louisville ===
	1	2	3	4	Total
Cardinals	3	7	7	0	17
Tigers	7	7	6	3	23

=== Boston College ===
	1	2	3	4	Total
Tigers	0	10	0	7	17
Eagles	0	7	0	6	13

=== Syracuse ===
	1	2	3	4	Total
Orange	3	3	0	0	6
Tigers	0	3	6	7	16

=== Wake Forest ===
	1	2	3	4	Total
Tigers	0	17	3	14	34
Demon Deacons	7	10	0	3	20

=== Georgia Tech ===
	1	2	3	4	Total
Tigers	3	0	3	0	6
Yellow Jackets	6	3	16	3	28

=== Georgia State ===
	1	2	3	4	Total
Panthers	0	0	0	0	0
Tigers	14	14	0	0	28

=== South Carolina ===
	1	2	3	4	Total
Gamecocks	7	3	0	7	17
Tigers	7	14	7	7	35

=== Oklahoma (Russell Athletic Bowl) ===
	1	2	3	4	Total
Sooners	0	0	0	6	6
Tigers	17	10	13	0	40

== Rankings ==
Ranking movements Legend: ██ Increase in ranking ██ Decrease in ranking RV = Received votes
	Week																
Poll	Pre	1	2	3	4	5	6	7	8	9	10	11	12	13	14	15	Final
AP	16	23	23	22	RV	RV	RV	24	21	22	19	18	RV	23	19	18	15
Coaches	16	24	24	24	RV	RV	25	22	20	21	19	17	RV	24	19	18	15
CFP	Not released									21	21	19	22	21	18	17	Not released

== 2015 NFL draft ==
Clemson had five players selected in the 2015 NFL draft. Vic Beasley was picked first at eighth overall.

Player	Team	Round	Pick #	Position
Vic Beasley	Atlanta Falcons	1st	8th	DE
Stephone Anthony	New Orleans Saints	1st	31st	OLB
Grady Jarrett	Atlanta Falcons	5th	137th	DT
Bradley Pinion	San Francisco 49ers	5th	165th	P
Tony Steward	Buffalo Bills	6th	188th	OLB

=== Undrafted signees ===
In addition to five draft picks, four more Clemson Tigers made it into the NFL as undrafted rookies.

Player	Team	Position
Corey Crawford	Washington Redskins	DL
Adam Humphries	Tampa Bay Buccaneers	WR
DeShawn Williams	Cincinnati Bengals	DL
Tavaris Barnes	New Orleans Saints	DE

== Awards ==
=== Preseason All-ACC Offense ===
Fourth Team

•Wayne Gallman – Running back

•Charone Peake – Wide receiver

=== Preseason All-ACC Defense ===
First Team

•Vic Beasley – Defensive end

•Grady Jarrett - Defensive tackle

•Stephone Anthony - Linebacker

Third Team

•Corey Crawford – Defensive end

•Jayron Kearse - Safety

Fourth Team

•Tony Steward - Linebacker

=== Preseason All-ACC Special Teams ===
Fourth Team

•Adam Humphries - Punt Returner
