= Grady Jarrett =

American football player (born 1993)

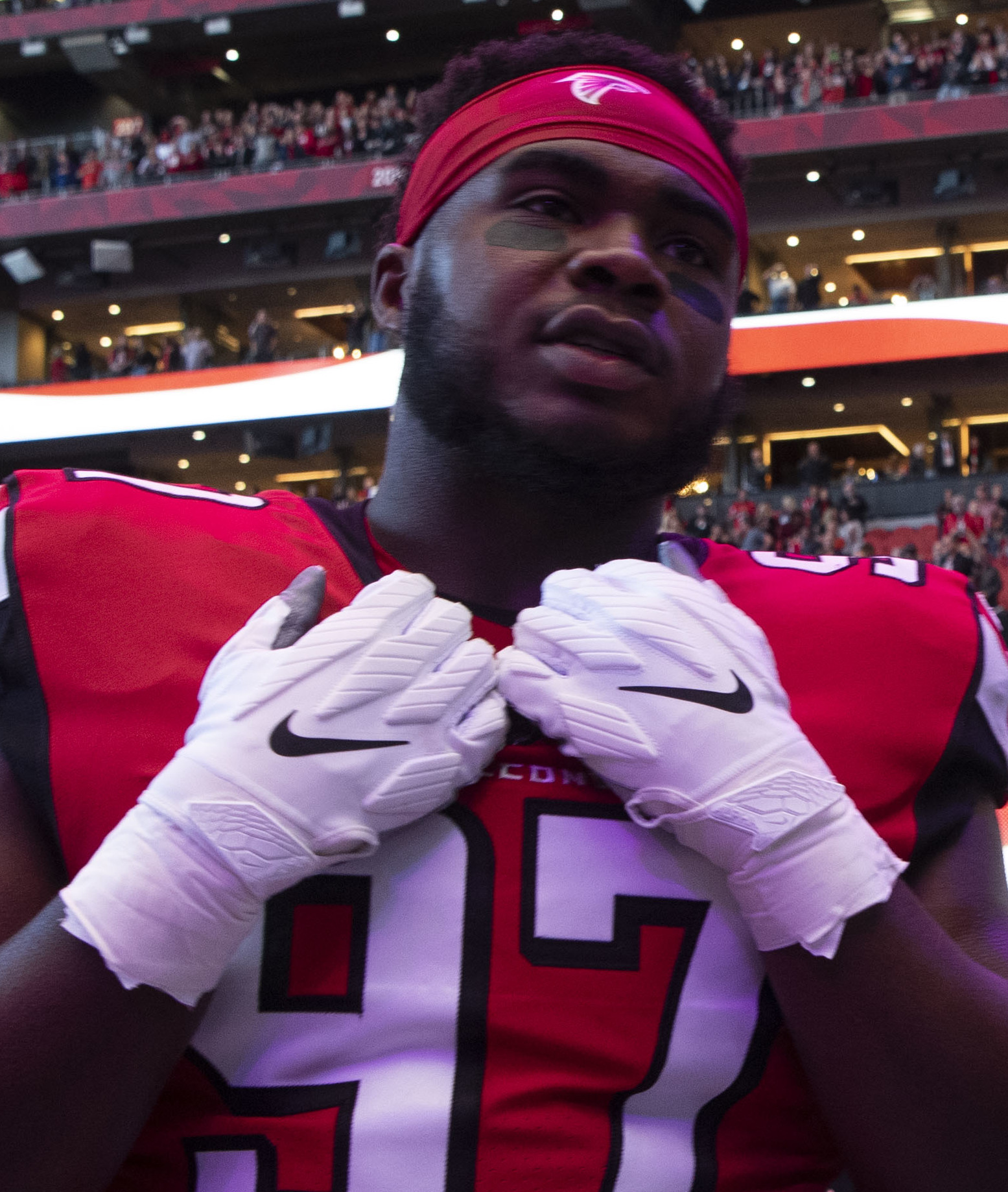
- Jarrett with the Atlanta Falcons in 2019

No. 50 – Chicago Bears
- Position: Defensive tackle
- Roster status: Active

Personal information
- Born: April 28, 1993 (age 33); Atlanta, Georgia, U.S.
- Listed height: 6 ft 1 in (1.85 m)
- Listed weight: 294 lb (133 kg)

Career information
- High school: Rockdale County (Conyers, Georgia)
- College: Clemson (2011–2014)
- NFL draft: 2015: 5th round, 137th overall pick

Career history
- Atlanta Falcons (2015–2024); Chicago Bears (2025–present)

Awards and highlights
- Second-team All-Pro (2019); 2× Pro Bowl (2019, 2020); First-team All-ACC (2014)

Career NFL statistics as of Week 5, 2026
- Total tackles: 546
- Sacks: 38
- Forced fumbles: 5
- Fumble recoveries: 3
- Pass deflections: 9
- Stats at Pro Football Reference

Grady Jarrett (born April 28, 1993) is an American professional football defensive tackle for the Chicago Bears of the National Football League (NFL). He played college football for the Clemson Tigers and was drafted by the Atlanta Falcons in the 5th round of the 2015 NFL draft.

== Early life ==
Jarrett attended Rockdale County High School in Conyers, Georgia, where he was a two-time All-state selection. A four-year starter on both sides of the ball, he had 198 tackles, 63 tackles for a loss, and 27.5 sacks over his last two years. He was a three-time All-regional selection on defense and second-team All-region on offense as a senior, as well as a three-time selection as the team's top defensive player after compiling 101 tackles (31.5 for a loss) and nine sacks. He also played in the North-South All-Star game in Georgia and Florida Maxx Scout All-Star Bowl; in the two games combined, he had 17 tackles, seven tackles for loss, 3.5 sacks, and three caused fumbles.

In addition, Jarrett was also a member of the school's wrestling team; he was fourth in the state as a junior and won the state heavyweight title as a senior. Also a top performer in track & field, Jarrett won the state title in the shot put as a senior with a throw of 15.46 meters (50-6).

Jarrett was rated by Rivals.com as a three-star recruit. He was rated the No. 41 defensive tackle in the nation by Scout.com. He committed to Clemson University to play college football.

== College career ==
Jarrett attended Clemson from 2011 to 2014. As a true freshman, he appeared in nine games, making two tackles. As a sophomore, Jarrett started 11 of 13 games. He had 49 tackles and had two sacks. As a starter his junior season, he had 83 tackles and two sacks in 13 games. He again started all 13 games during his senior season, recording 73 tackles and 1.5 sacks and was named first-team All-Atlantic Coast Conference in recognition of his successful senior season.

== Professional career ==
Pre-draft measurables
| Height | Weight | Arm length | Hand span | Wingspan | 40-yard dash | 10-yard split | 20-yard split | 20-yard shuttle | Three-cone drill | Vertical jump | Broad jump | Bench press |
|---|---|---|---|---|---|---|---|---|---|---|---|---|
| 6 ft 0 3/4 in (1.85 m) | 304 lb (138 kg) | 32 3/8 in (0.82 m) | 10 in (0.25 m) | 6 ft 6 5/8 in (2.00 m) | 5.06 s | 1.69 s | 2.87 s | 4.56 s | 7.37 s | 31 in (0.79 m) | 9 ft 5 in (2.87 m) | 33 reps |
All values from NFL Combine and Pro Day

=== Atlanta Falcons ===
==== 2015 ====
Jarrett was selected in the fifth round (137th overall) by the Atlanta Falcons in the 2015 NFL draft. Atlanta traded two draft picks to the Minnesota Vikings to move up and take Jarrett, giving up their 146th and 187th picks.

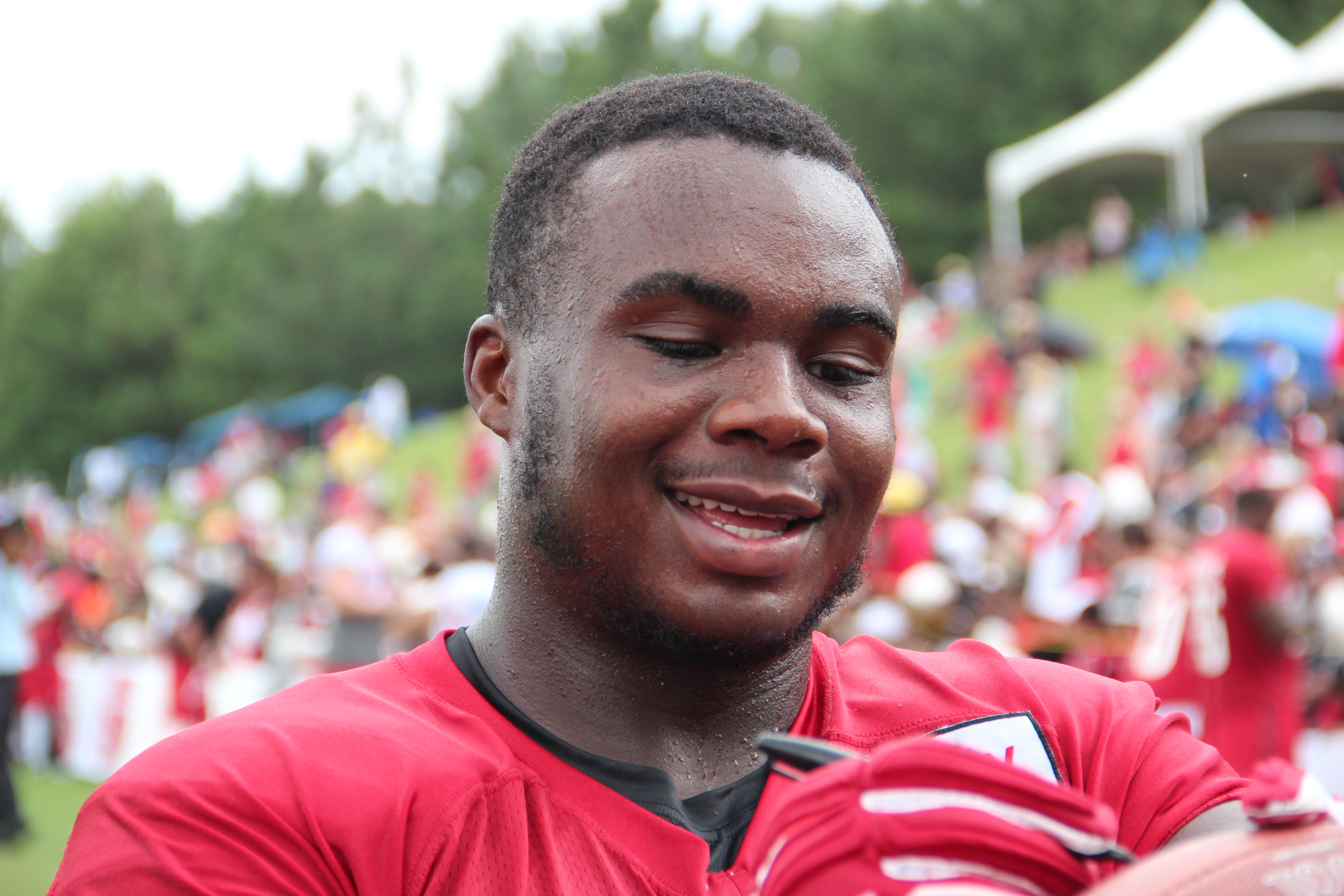
Jarrett with the Falcons in 2015

Jarrett came to terms with the Falcons on May 9, 2015, signing a four-year $2.527 million contract. As a rookie in 2015, Jarrett played in 15 games, finishing the season with 24 tackles, four tackles for loss, two quarterback hits, and one sack. Jarrett recorded his first professional sack on December 12 against the Tampa Bay Buccaneers.

==== 2016 ====
In 2016, Jarrett played all 16 games, starting 14. Jarrett finished the season with 48 tackles, 4 tackles for loss, nine quarterback hits, and three sacks.

During Super Bowl LI against the New England Patriots, Jarrett sacked Tom Brady three times, which tied a record for most sacks in a single Super Bowl game. In addition, Jarrett had five total tackles in the 34–28 overtime loss.

==== 2017 ====
In 2017, Jarrett started all 16 games, recording a career-high 55 tackles, 15 tackles for loss, 13 quarterback hits, and four sacks.

==== 2018 ====
In Week 15 of the 2018 season, Jarrett recorded seven tackles, two sacks, and a forced fumble in a 40–14 win over the Arizona Cardinals, earning him NFC Defensive Player of the Week. Jarrett finished the 2018 season with then career-highs in both sacks and forced fumbles, with 6 and 3, respectively.

==== 2019 ====
On March 4, 2019, the Falcons placed the franchise tag on Jarrett. Jarrett signed the franchise tag on April 22, 2019. On July 15, 2019, Jarrett signed a four-year contract extension worth $68 million with $42.5 million guaranteed, making him the third highest paid defensive tackle in the league. In Week 1 against the Minnesota Vikings, Jarrett recorded his first sack of the season on Kirk Cousins in the 28–12 loss. In Week 8 against the Seattle Seahawks, Jarrett recorded a team high 8 tackles and sacked Russell Wilson once in the 27–20 loss. In Week 9 against the New Orleans Saints, Jarrett had 2.5 sacks and five quarterback hits in the 26–9 upset win. In Week 16 against the Jacksonville Jaguars, Jarrett had one sack and three tackles in the 24–12 win. In Week 17 against the Buccaneers, Jarrett recorded one sack in the 28–22 overtime win. Jarrett finished the 2019 season with a career-high 7.5 sacks and 69 tackles, as well as 11 tackles for loss and 2 forced fumbles.

On December 17, 2019, Jarrett was invited to his first Pro Bowl. On January 3, 2020, Jarrett was named second-team All-Pro. He was ranked 91st by his fellow players on the NFL Top 100 Players of 2020.

==== 2020 ====
In Week 1 against the Seahawks, Jarrett led the Falcons with 1.5 sacks on quarterback Russell Wilson during the 38–25 loss.

On December 20, 2020, Jarrett was selected to his second Pro Bowl. He finished the 2020 season with four sacks, 52 tackles, and one fumble recovery. He was ranked 51st by his fellow players on the NFL Top 100 Players of 2021.

==== 2021 ====
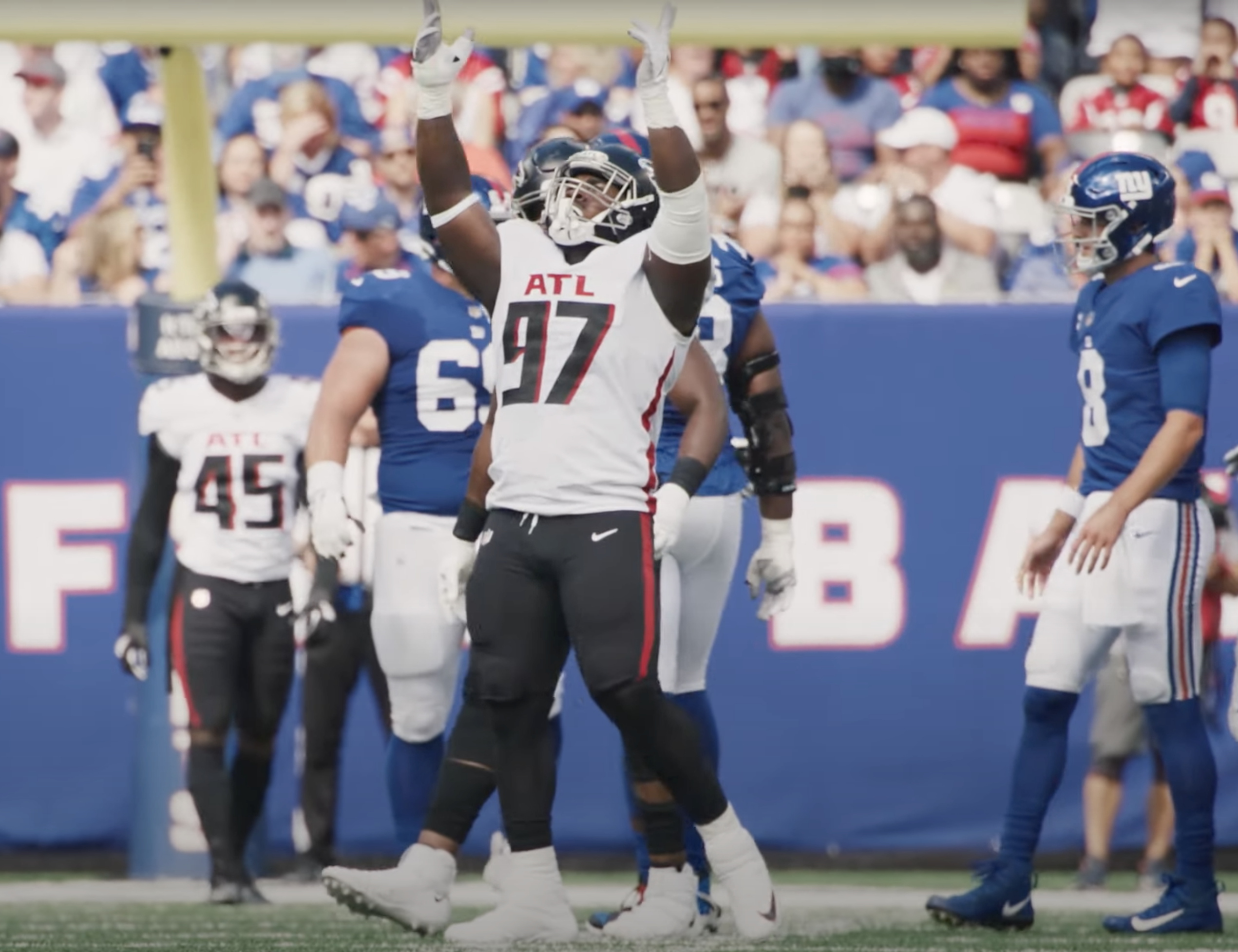
Jarrett with the Falcons in 2021

In 2021, Jarrett started all 17 games for the Falcons, ending the season with one sack and 59 tackles.

==== 2022 ====
On May 3, 2022, Jarrett and the Falcons agreed to a three-year contract extension worth up to $67 million with another $1.5 million in incentives. He finished the 2022 season with six sacks, 61 tackles, and three passes defended. He was ranked 63rd by his fellow players on the NFL Top 100 Players of 2023.

==== 2023 ====
In the eighth game of the season, Jarrett suffered a torn ACL in a loss to the Tennessee Titans. After being ruled out for the season the following Monday, he finished his 2023 campaign with 23 tackles (two for loss), 1.5 sacks, and eight quarterback hits.

==== 2024 ====
Jarrett started all 17 games for the Falcons during the 2024 season, recording 2.5 sacks and 53 combined tackles.

Jarrett was released by the Falcons on March 10, 2025.

=== Chicago Bears ===
On March 12, 2025, Jarrett signed a three-year, $43.5 million with the Chicago Bears. He finished the 2025 season with 1.5 sacks, 39 tackles, and three passes defended.

== Career statistics ==
=== NFL ===
==== Regular season ====
| Year | Team | Games | | Tackles | | | | | Fumbles | |
| Year | Team | GP | GS | Cmb | Solo | Ast | Sck | TfL | FF | FR |
|---|---|---|---|---|---|---|---|---|---|---|
| 2015 | ATL | 15 | 2 | 24 | 13 | 11 | 1.0 | 4 | 0 | 0 |
| 2016 | ATL | 16 | 14 | 48 | 21 | 27 | 3.0 | 4 | 0 | 1 |
| 2017 | ATL | 16 | 16 | 55 | 34 | 21 | 4.0 | 15 | 0 | 0 |
| 2018 | ATL | 14 | 14 | 52 | 27 | 25 | 6.0 | 8 | 3 | 0 |
| 2019 | ATL | 16 | 16 | 69 | 38 | 31 | 7.5 | 12 | 2 | 0 |
| 2020 | ATL | 16 | 16 | 52 | 27 | 25 | 4.0 | 8 | 0 | 1 |
| 2021 | ATL | 17 | 17 | 59 | 38 | 21 | 1.0 | 3 | 0 | 1 |
| 2022 | ATL | 17 | 17 | 61 | 30 | 31 | 6.0 | 12 | 0 | 0 |
| 2023 | ATL | 8 | 8 | 23 | 9 | 14 | 1.5 | 2 | 0 | 0 |
| 2024 | ATL | 17 | 17 | 53 | 30 | 23 | 2.5 | 9 | 0 | 0 |
| 2025 | CHI | 14 | 4 | 39 | 14 | 25 | 1.5 | 1 | 0 | 0 |
| 2026 | CHI | 5 | 5 | 11 | 3 | 8 | 0.0 | 1 | 0 | 0 |
| Career | | 171 | 146 | 546 | 284 | 262 | 38.0 | 79 | 5 | 3 |

==== Postseason ====
| Year | Team | Games | | Tackles | | | | | Fumbles | |
| Year | Team | GP | GS | Cmb | Solo | Ast | Sck | TfL | FF | FR |
|---|---|---|---|---|---|---|---|---|---|---|
| 2016 | ATL | 3 | 3 | 10 | 7 | 3 | 3.0 | 3 | 0 | 0 |
| 2017 | ATL | 2 | 2 | 2 | 2 | 0 | 0.0 | 0 | 0 | 0 |
| 2025 | CHI | 2 | 0 | 6 | 2 | 4 | 0.0 | 0 | 1 | 0 |
| Career | | 7 | 5 | 18 | 11 | 7 | 3.0 | 3 | 1 | 0 |

=== College ===
| Season | Team | GP | Cmb | TfL | Sck | Int | FF |
|---|---|---|---|---|---|---|---|
| 2011 | Clemson | 9 | 4 | 0 | 0 | 0 | 0 |
| 2012 | Clemson | | 15 | 8.5 | 2.0 | 0 | 0 |
| 2013 | Clemson | 13 | 59 | 10 | 2.0 | 0 | 0 |
| 2014 | Clemson | 12 | 45 | 10 | 1.5 | 0 | 2 |
| Total | | | 144 | 28.5 | 5.5 | 0 | 2 |

== Personal life ==
His father, Jessie Tuggle, played in the NFL for the Atlanta Falcons from 1987 to 2000. His brother, Justin Tuggle, is a former member of the Toronto Argonauts of the Canadian Football League. He also has a close relationship with Ray Lewis who he refers to as "uncle," though they are not related biologically.

Jarrett's home in Conyers, Georgia partially burned down during the second day of the 2015 NFL draft. There were nearly 50 people, including friends and family members at the home at the time of the fire. No injuries were reported, and the cause of the fire was believed to be electrical. The Falcons drafted Jarrett the next day and immediately sent him team gear.
