= 2014 Wake Forest Demon Deacons football team =

American college football season

2014 Wake Forest Demon Deacons football
- Conference: Atlantic Coast Conference
- Atlantic Division
- Record: 3–9 (1–7 ACC)
- Head coach: Dave Clawson (1st season)
- Offensive coordinator: Warren Ruggiero (1st season)
- Offensive scheme: Multiple
- Defensive coordinator: Mike Elko (1st season)
- Base defense: 4–2–5
- Captains: Jordan Garside; Merrill Noel; Brandon Chubb; Hunter Williams; Ryan Janvion
- Home stadium: BB&T Field

2014 Atlantic Coast Conference football standings
	Conf.			Overall
Team	W		L	W		L
Atlantic Division
No. T–5 Florida State x$^	8	–	0	13	–	1
No. 15 Clemson	6	–	2	10	–	3
No. 24 Louisville	5	–	3	9	–	4
Boston College	4	–	4	7	–	6
NC State	3	–	5	8	–	5
Syracuse	1	–	7	3	–	9
Wake Forest	1	–	7	3	–	9
Coastal Division
No. 8 Georgia Tech x	6	–	2	11	–	3
Duke	5	–	3	9	–	4
North Carolina	4	–	4	6	–	7
Pittsburgh	4	–	4	6	–	7
Miami (FL)	3	–	5	6	–	7
Virginia Tech	3	–	5	7	–	6
Virginia	3	–	5	5	–	7
Championship: Florida State 37, Georgia Tech 35
^ – College Football Playoff participant; $ – Conference champion; x – Division champion/co-champions; Rankings from AP Poll

The 2014 Wake Forest Demon Deacons football team represented Wake Forest University during the 2014 NCAA Division I FBS football season. The team was coached by Dave Clawson, who was coaching his first season at the school, and played its home games at BB&T Field. Wake Forest competed in the Atlantic Coast Conference as part of the Atlantic Division, as they have since the league's inception in 1953. They finished the season 3–9, 1–7 in ACC play to finish in a tie for sixth place in the Atlantic Division.

== Recruiting ==
College recruiting information (2014)
Name	Hometown	School	Height	Weight	40^{‡}	Commit date
Ryan Anderson; OT	Raleigh, NC	Wakefield HS	6 ft 6 in (1.98 m)	275 lb (125 kg)	N/A	Nov 29, 2013
Ryan Anderson; OT	Recruit ratings: Scout: Rivals: 247Sports: ESPN:					
Jaylan Barbour; WR	Monroe, NC	Monroe HS	5 ft 10 in (1.78 m)	165 lb (75 kg)	4.45	Aug 9, 2013
Jaylan Barbour; WR	Recruit ratings: Scout: Rivals: 247Sports: ESPN:					
Adam Centers; P/PK	Coppell, TX	Coppell HS	6 ft 0 in (1.83 m)	195 lb (88 kg)	N/A	Feb 3, 2014
Adam Centers; P/PK	Recruit ratings: Scout: Rivals: 247Sports: ESPN:					
Thomas Dillon; CB	Houston, TX	Kinkaid HS	5 ft 11 in (1.80 m)	173 lb (78 kg)	4.50	Jul 15, 2013
Thomas Dillon; CB	Recruit ratings: Scout: Rivals: 247Sports: ESPN:					
Cameron Glenn; DB	Stone Mountain, GA	Stephenson HS	6 ft 2 in (1.88 m)	185 lb (84 kg)	N/A	Apr 6, 2013
Cameron Glenn; DB	Recruit ratings: Scout: Rivals: 247Sports: ESPN:					
Tyler Henderson; RB	Lawrenceville, GA	Collins Hill HS	5 ft 9 in (1.75 m)	180 lb (82 kg)	4.40	Jan 20, 2014
Tyler Henderson; RB	Recruit ratings: Scout: Rivals: 247Sports: ESPN:					
Justin Herron; OL	Silver Spring, MD	Bullis HS	6 ft 5 in (1.96 m)	285 lb (129 kg)	N/A	Jan 29, 2014
Justin Herron; OL	Recruit ratings: Scout: Rivals: 247Sports: ESPN:					
Demetrius Kemp; ATH	Demopolis, AL	Demopolis HS	6 ft 0 in (1.83 m)	182 lb (83 kg)	4.60	Nov 29, 2013
Demetrius Kemp; ATH	Recruit ratings: Scout: Rivals: 247Sports: ESPN:					
DaiQuan Lawrence; CB	Chesapeake, VA	Western Branch HS	6 ft 0 in (1.83 m)	180 lb (82 kg)	4.40	Jan 19, 2014
DaiQuan Lawrence; CB	Recruit ratings: Scout: Rivals: 247Sports: ESPN:					
Cortez Lewis; WR	Demopolis, AL	Demopolis HS	6 ft 1 in (1.85 m)	200 lb (91 kg)	4.50	Nov 27, 2013
Cortez Lewis; WR	Recruit ratings: Scout: Rivals: 247Sports: ESPN:					
Nick Luedeke; LS	Cary, NC	Holly Springs HS	6 ft 5 in (1.96 m)	250 lb (110 kg)	N/A	Jul 16, 2013
Nick Luedeke; LS	Recruit ratings: Scout: Rivals: 247Sports: ESPN:					
Kalin McNeil; LB	McLeansville, NC	Northeast Guilford HS	6 ft 2 in (1.88 m)	190 lb (86 kg)	4.50	Jul 16, 2013
Kalin McNeil; LB	Recruit ratings: Scout: Rivals: 247Sports: ESPN:					
Pat Osterhage; OL	Centerville, OH	Centerville HS	6 ft 4 in (1.93 m)	280 lb (130 kg)	N/A	Jan 22, 2014
Pat Osterhage; OL	Recruit ratings: Scout: Rivals: 247Sports: ESPN:					
Devin Pike; TE	Cincinnati, OH	Elder HS	6 ft 6 in (1.98 m)	225 lb (102 kg)	N/A	Jan 29, 2014
Devin Pike; TE	Recruit ratings: Scout: Rivals: 247Sports: ESPN:					
Isaiah Robinson; RB	Charlotte, NC	Independence HS	5 ft 10 in (1.78 m)	223 lb (101 kg)	N/A	Jul 12, 2013
Isaiah Robinson; RB	Recruit ratings: Scout: Rivals: 247Sports: ESPN:					
Zeek Rodney; DL	Rock Hill, SC	South Pointe HS	6 ft 1 in (1.85 m)	265 lb (120 kg)	N/A	Jan 26, 2014
Zeek Rodney; DL	Recruit ratings: Scout: Rivals: 247Sports: ESPN:					
Rashawn Shaw; DL	Fort Pierce, FL	Central HS	6 ft 3 in (1.91 m)	240 lb (110 kg)	N/A	Jan 23, 2014
Rashawn Shaw; DL	Recruit ratings: Scout: Rivals: 247Sports: ESPN:					
Travis Smith; QB	Ithaca, MI	Ithaca HS	6 ft 1 in (1.85 m)	210 lb (95 kg)	4.70	Jan 27, 2014
Travis Smith; QB	Recruit ratings: Scout: Rivals: 247Sports: ESPN:					
Chris Stewart; DL	Petal, MS	Petal HS	6 ft 3 in (1.91 m)	245 lb (111 kg)	N/A	Feb 1, 2014
Chris Stewart; DL	Recruit ratings: Scout: Rivals: 247Sports: ESPN:					
A'lique Terry; OL	Hialeah, FL	Hialeah HS	6 ft 1 in (1.85 m)	300 lb (140 kg)	N/A	Oct 15, 2013
A'lique Terry; OL	Recruit ratings: Scout: Rivals: 247Sports: ESPN:					
Kameron Uter; WR	Atlanta, GA	Pace Academy	6 ft 4 in (1.93 m)	215 lb (98 kg)	4.50	Jan 29, 2014
Kameron Uter; WR	Recruit ratings: Scout: Rivals: 247Sports: ESPN:					
Zack Wary; LB	Rogers, AR	Rogers HS	6 ft 4 in (1.93 m)	215 lb (98 kg)	4.50	Jan 30, 2014
Zack Wary; LB	Recruit ratings: Scout: Rivals: 247Sports: ESPN:					
Jaboree Williams; LB	Fort Lauderdale, FL	Fort Lauderdale HS	6 ft 0 in (1.83 m)	210 lb (95 kg)	N/A	Dec 12, 2013
Jaboree Williams; LB	Recruit ratings: Scout: Rivals: 247Sports: ESPN:					
John Wolford; QB	Jacksonville, FL	Bishop Kenny HS	6 ft 1 in (1.85 m)	210 lb (95 kg)	4.76	Dec 14, 2013
John Wolford; QB	Recruit ratings: Scout: Rivals: 247Sports: ESPN:					
Willie Yarbary; DL	Augusta, GA	Richmond Academy	6 ft 2 in (1.88 m)	270 lb (120 kg)	N/A	Feb 5, 2014
Willie Yarbary; DL	Recruit ratings: Scout: Rivals: 247Sports: ESPN:					
Overall recruit ranking: Scout: 64 Rivals: 59 247Sports: 65 ESPN: 63
‡ Refers to 40-yard dash; Note: In many cases, Scout, Rivals, 247Sports, On3, and ESPN may conflict in their listings of height, weight and 40 time.; In these cases, the average was taken. ESPN grades are on a 100-point scale.; Sources: "Wake Forest 2014 Football Commitments". Rivals.; "2014 Wake Forest Commits". Scout.; "2014 Player Commitments – Wake Forest". ESPN.; "Scout.com Team Recruiting Rankings". Scout.; "2014 Team Ranking". Rivals.com.

== Schedule ==
Date	Time	Opponent	Site	TV	Result	Attendance
August 28	7:00 pm	at Louisiana–Monroe*	Malone Stadium; Monroe, LA	ESPNU	L 10–17	21,003
September 6	6:30 pm	Gardner–Webb*	BB&T Field; Winston-Salem, NC	ESPN3	W 23–7	26,925
September 13	7:00 pm	at Utah State*	Romney Stadium; Logan, UT	CBSSN	L 24–36	20,345
September 20	3:30 pm	Army*^{†}	BB&T Field; Winston-Salem, NC	ESPN3	W 24–21	28,123
September 27	3:30 pm	at Louisville	Papa John's Cardinal Stadium; Louisville, KY	ESPNU	L 10–20	51,463
October 4	3:30 pm	at No. 1 Florida State	Doak Campbell Stadium; Tallahassee, FL	ABC	L 3–43	82,327
October 18	12:00 pm	Syracuse	BB&T Field; Winston-Salem, NC	RSN	L 7–30	25,107
October 25	3:30 pm	Boston College	BB&T Field; Winston-Salem, NC	RSN	L 17–23	26,439
November 6	7:30 pm	No. 19 Clemson	BB&T Field; Winston-Salem, NC	ESPN	L 20–34	28,846
November 15	3:00 pm	at NC State	Carter–Finley Stadium; Raleigh, NC (rivalry)	RSN	L 13–42	55,353
November 22	12:30 pm	Virginia Tech	BB&T Field; Winston-Salem, NC	ACCN	W 6–3 ^{2OT}	27,820
November 29	7:00 pm	at Duke	Wallace Wade Stadium; Durham, NC (rivalry)	ESPNU	L 21–41	22,247
*Non-conference game; ^{†}Homecoming; Rankings from AP Poll released prior to the game; All times are in Eastern time

== Roster ==
2014 Wake Forest Demon Deacons
Offense Quarterbacks: 4 Tyler Cameron – (redshirt) Sophomore; 8 Kevin Sousa – (redshirt) Junior; 10 John Wolford – Freshman; 13 Travis Smith – Freshman; 15 Kyle Driscoll – Freshman; 17 Pat Long – (redshirt) Junior; Running backs: 5 Orville Reynolds – Senior; 14 Dominique Gibson – (redshirt) Sophomore; 20 Dezmond Wortham – (redshirt) Freshman; 21 Isaiah Robinson – Freshman; 23 James Ward – Junior; 24 Tyler Henderson – Freshman; 28 Christopher Pearcey – Freshman; Fullbacks: 32 Charles Argenzio – Sophomore; 43 Jordan Garside – (redshirt) Senior; Wide receivers: 2 Matt James – (redshirt) Senior; 11 Airyn Willis – (redshirt) Junior; 12 Tyree Harris – Sophomore; 17 E.J. Scott – Graduate Student; 18 John Armstrong – Sophomore; 80 Malcolm Nunley – Senior; 81 Cortez Lewis – Freshman; 82 P.J. Howard IV – (redshirt) Junior; 83 Jonathan Williams – (redshirt) Sophomore; 86 Brandon Terry – (redshirt) Senior; 88 Jared Crump – (redshirt) Sophomore; Tight ends: 41 Devin Pike – Freshman; 45 Zach Gordon – (redshirt) Sophomore; 49 Spencer Stone – (redshirt) Freshman; 84 Brendan O'Neill – (redshirt) Freshman; 85 Cam Serigne – (redshirt) Freshman; 89 Neil Basford – (redshirt) Senior; Offensive Linemen: 51 Cory Helms – Sophomore; 55 A'Lique Terry – Freshman; 56 Harry Warner – Freshman; 59 Antonio Ford – (redshirt) Senior; 60 Nick Luedeke – Freshman; 63 Dylan Intemann – (redshirt) Junior; 65 Josh T. Harris – Sophomore; 66 Rocco Esposito – (redshirt) Freshman; 67 Taylor Chambers – (redshirt) Freshman; 68 Patrick Osterhage – Freshman; 70 Ryan Anderson – Freshman; 71 Hunter Goodwin – (redshirt) Junior; 72 Cody Preble – (redshirt) Junior; 75 Justin Herron – Freshman; 76 Joel Suggs – (redshirt) Sophomore; 77 Will Smith – (redshirt) Sophomore; 78 Tyler Hayworth – (redshirt) Sophomore; 79 Cameron Gardner – (redshirt) Freshman	Defense Defensive ends: 6 Desmond Floyd – (redshirt) Junior; 14 Wendell Dunn – (redshirt) Freshman; 35 Zachary Allen – (redshirt) Senior; 36 Tylor Harris – Junior; 53 Duke Ejiofor – (redshirt) Freshman; 57 Ali Lamot – (redshirt) Freshman; 87 Phil Haynes – Freshman; 90 Rashawn Shaw – Freshman; 94 William Flood – Sophomore; 95 Shelldon Lewinson – (redshirt) Sophomore; 96 Chris Stewart – Freshman; 99 Andre Chiles – Freshman; Defensive tackles: 40 Josh Banks – (redshirt) Sophomore; 62 Reid Althoff – (redshirt) Freshman; 91 Johnny Garcia – (redshirt) Senior; 92 Willie Yarbary – Freshman; 93 Zeek Rodney – Freshman; Linebackers: 8 Marquel Lee – Sophomore; 10 Zack Wary – Freshman; 28 Teddy Matthews – (redshirt) Sophomore; 30 Hunter Williams – (redshirt) Junior; 39 Jaboree Williams – Freshman; 42 Julian Thomas-Jackson – (redshirt) Freshman; 44 Kalin McNeil – Freshman; 46 Steve Donatell – (redshirt) Sophomore; 48 Brandon Chubb – (redshirt) Junior; 49 Lance Virgile – (redshirt) Freshman; 50 Grant Dawson – (redshirt) Freshman; 54 Britt Cherry – (redshirt) Junior; 58 Vincent Paolucci – Freshman; Cornerbacks: 7 Merrill Noel – (redshirt) Senior; 9 Kevin Johnson – (redshirt) Senior; 13 Jalen Latter – Sophomore; 15 Allen Ramsey – (redshirt) Junior; 20 Chuck Schlegel – (redshirt) Senior; 21 Josh M. Harris – Junior; 25 Brad Watson – Sophomore; 29 Deonte Davis – Sophomore; 32 DaiQuan Lawrence – Freshman; 34 Demetrius Kemp – Freshman; 37 Thomas Dillon – Freshman; Safeties: 11 Anthony Wooding Jr. – Senior; 22 Ryan Janvion – (redshirt) Sophomore; 23 Cameron Glenn – Freshman; 24 Josh Okonye – (redshirt) Freshman; 26 Thomas Brown – Sophomore	Special teams Placekickers: 18 Mike Weaver – (redshirt) Freshman; 27 Chad Hedlund – (redshirt) Junior; 97 Austin Iglehart – Freshman; 98 Adam Centers – Freshman; Punters: 18 Mike Weaver – (redshirt) Freshman; 38 Alexander Kinal – (redshirt) Junior; Long Snappers: 52 Logan Feimster – (redshirt) Senior; 61 Ryan Bauder – (redshirt) Junior; 64 Chase Wilson – (redshirt) Freshman; Kick returners: 18 John Armstrong – Sophomore; 24 Tyler Henderson – Freshman; Punt Returners: 9 Kevin Johnson – (redshirt) Senior; 88 Jared Crump – (redshirt) Sophomore

== Coaching staff ==
Position	Name	First year at WFU
Head coach	Dave Clawson	2014
Defensive coordinator	Mike Elko	2014
Assistant head coach	Kevin Higgins	2014
Offensive coordinator	Warren Ruggiero	2014
Special teams coordinator/tight ends	Adam Scheier	2014
Linebackers	Warren Belin	2013
Defensive Line	Dave Cohen	2014
Running backs	John Hunter	2014
Secondary	Derrick Jackson	2012
Offensive Line	Nick Tabacca	2014
Graduate assistant	Tyler Santucci	2014

== Game summaries ==
=== Louisiana-Monroe ===
2nd meeting. 0–1 all time. Last meeting 2013, 21-19 Warhawks in Winston-Salem.

Week One: Wake Forest Demon Deacons at Louisiana-Monroe Warhawks – Game summary

Quarter	1	2	3	4	Total
Demon Deacons	7	3	0	0	10
Warhawks	0	0	10	7	17

at Malone Stadium, Monroe, Louisiana

- Date: August 28
- Game time: 7:00 p.m. EST
- Game weather: 87° F
- Game attendance: 21,003
- Referee: Pat Garvey
- TV announcers (ESPNU): Dave LaMont and David Diaz-Infante
- Final Stats

Game information

First quarter

- WFU – Kevin Johnson 25-yard blocked punt return (Mike Weaver kick), 12:10. Demon Deacons 7–0.

Second quarter

- WFU – Mike Weaver 38-yard field goal, 0:43. Demon Deacons 10–0. Drive: 9 plays, 45 yards, 3:24.

Third quarter

- ULM – Justin Manton 30-yard field goal, 4:50. Demon Deacons 10–3. Drive: 16 plays, 83 yards, 7:01.
- ULM – Mitch Lane 31-yard interception return (Justin Manton kick), 4:02. Tied 10–10.

Fourth quarter

- ULM – Pete Thomas 9-yard run (Justin Manton kick), 3:37. Warhawks 17–10. Drive: 12 plays, 66 yards, 5:47.

Leading Passers

- WFU – J. Wolford 12/22 Comp/Att 97 Yds, 1 INT
- ULM – P. Thomas 23/41 Comp/Att 189 Yds

Leading Rushers

- WFU – O. Reynolds 16 Rushes 37 Yds. 2.3 Avg 9 Lng.
- ULM – C. Donald 26 Rushes 117 Yds. 4.5 Avg 39 Lng.

Leading Receivers

- WFU – M. James 3 Rec. 40 Yds. 13.3 Avg 22 Lng.
- ULM – K. Jackson 6 Rec. 83 Yds. 13.8 Avg 29 Lng.

Leading Tacklers

- WFU – B. Chubb 9 Tack 9 Ast
- ULM – M. Lane 4 Tack 2 Ast

=== Gardner-Webb ===
2nd meeting. 1–0 all time. Last meeting 2011, 48-5 Deacons in Winston-Salem.

Week Two: Gardner-Webb Runnin' Bulldogs at Wake Forest Demon Deacons – Game summary

Quarter	1	2	3	4	Total
Runnin' Bulldogs	0	0	0	7	7
Demon Deacons	3	6	7	7	23

at BB&T Field, Winston-Salem, North Carolina

- Date: September 6
- Game time: 6:30 p.m. EST
- Game weather: 79° F
- Game attendance: 26,925
- Referee: Walter Davenport
- TV announcers (ESPN3): Dave Weekley and Al Groh
- Final Stats

Game information

First quarter

- WFU – Mike Weaver 27-yard field goal, 9:15. Demon Deacons 3–0. Drive: 13 plays, 64 yards, 5:45.

Second quarter

- WFU – Mike Weaver 37-yard field goal, 11:08. Demon Deacons 6–0. Drive: 10 plays, 29 yards, 4:44.
- WFU – Mike Weaver 28-yard field goal, 0:14. Demon Deacons 9–0. Drive: 16 plays, 78 yards, 7:43.

Third quarter

- WFU – E.J. Scott 10-yard pass from John Wolford (Mike Weaver kick), 10:20. Deacons 16–0. Drive: 9 plays, 65 yards, 2:34.

Fourth quarter

- WFU – E.J. Scott 14-yard pass from John Wolford (Mike Weaver kick), 11:59. Deacons 23–0. Drive: 8 plays, 54 yards, 2:42.
- GW – Tyrell Maxwell 5-yard run (Grayson Gregory kick), 0:16. Deacons 23–7. Drive: 6 plays, 47 yards, 2:15.

Leading Passers

- GW – L. Beatty 6/7 Comp/Att 45 Yds, 1 INT
- WFU – J. Wolford 30/38 Comp/Att 291 Yds, 2 TD, 3 INT

Leading Rushers

- GW – T. Maxwell 12 Rushes 62 Yds. 5.2 Avg 1 TD, 21 Lng.
- WFU – O. Reynolds 17 Rushes 54 Yds. 3.2 Avg 17 Lng.

Leading Receivers

- GW – M. Estes 2 Rec. 23 Yds. 11.5 Avg 20 Lng.
- WFU – C. Serigne 5 Rec. 62 Yds. 12.4 Avg 32 Lng.

Leading Tacklers

- GW – B. Taylor 8 Tack 3 Ast
- WFU – M. Lee 6 Tack 2 Ast 1 Sack

=== Utah State ===
1st meeting.

Week Three: Wake Forest Demon Deacons at Utah State Aggies – Game summary

Quarter	1	2	3	4	Total
Demon Deacons	7	0	17	0	24
Aggies	7	22	7	0	36

at Romney Stadium, Logan, Utah

- Date: September 13
- Game time: 7:00 p.m. EST
- Game weather: 73° F
- Game attendance: 20,345
- Referee: Greg Burks
- TV announcers (CBS Sports Network): Matt McConnell, Eric Crouch, and Cassie Gallo
- Final Stats

Game information

First quarter

- WFU – Josh Banks 70-yard interception return (Mike Weaver kick), 7:28. Demon Deacons 7–0.
- USU – Zach Vigil 35-yard interception return (Nick Diaz kick), 3:03. Tied 7–7.

Second quarter

- USU – JoJo Natson 44-yard pass from Ronald Butler (kick failed), 8:21. Aggies 13–7. Drive: 5 plays, 67 yards, 1:53.
- USU – Devin Centers 47-yard fumble return (kick failed), 6:34. Aggies 19–7.
- USU – Jefferson Court 6-yard pass from Chuckie Keeton (Nick Diaz kick), 4:46. Aggies 26–7. Drive: 3 plays, 26 yards, 0:53.
- USU – Nick Diaz 26-yard field goal, 0:00. Aggies 29–7. Drive: 8 plays, 45 yards, 2:26.

Third quarter

- WFU – Isaiah Robinson 3-yard pass from John Wolford (Mike Weaver kick), 13:06. Aggies 29–14. Drive: 3 plays, 5 yards, 1:03.
- WFU – E.J. Scott 10-yard pass from John Wolford (Mike Weaver kick), 7:49. Aggies 29–21. Drive: 7 plays, 78 yards, 2:23.
- USU – Wyatt Houston 5-yard pass from Darell Garretson (Nick Diaz kick), 5:46. Aggies 36–21. Drive: 5 plays, 75 yards, 2:03.
- WFU – Mike Weaver 30-yard field goal, 1:01. Aggies 36-24. Drive: 13 plays, 66 yards, 4:38.

Fourth quarter

- No Scoring

Leading Passers

- WFU – J. Wolford 20/50 Comp/Att 27 Yds, 2 TD, 2 INT
- USU – C. Keeton 20/27 Comp/Att 166 Yds, 1 TD, 1 INT

Leading Rushers

- WFU – I. Robinson 9 Rushes 13 Yds. 1.4 Avg 11 Lng.
- USU – J. Natson 8 Rushes 49 Yds. 6.1 Avg 16 Lng.

Leading Receivers

- WFU – C. Serigne 7 Rec. 91 Yds. 13.0 Avg 21 Lng.
- USU – H. Sharp 12 Rec. 138 Yds. 11.5 Avg 31 Lng.

Leading Tacklers

- WFU – R. Janvion 5 Tack 13 Ast
- USU – F. Sutera 3 Tack 6 Ast

=== Army ===
14th meeting. 9–4 all time. Last meeting 2013, 25-11 Deacons in West Point.

Week Four: Army Black Knights at Wake Forest Demon Deacons – Game summary

Quarter	1	2	3	4	Total
Black Knights	7	14	0	0	21
Demon Deacons	7	7	0	10	24

at BB&T Field, Winston-Salem, North Carolina

- Date: September 20
- Game time: 3:30 p.m. EST
- Game weather: 79° F
- Game attendance: 28,123
- Referee: Ron Cherry
- TV announcers (ESPN3): Roy Philpott, George Wrighster, and Angela Mallen
- Final Stats

Game information

First quarter

- WFU – Isaiah Robinson 15-yard run (Mike Weaver kick), 6:00. Deacons 7–0. Drive: 6 plays, 74 yards, 1:41.
- ARMY – Larry Dixon 5-yard run (Daniel Grochowski kick), 0:49. Tied 7–7. Drive: 8 plays, 76 yards, 5:05.

Second quarter

- WFU – Cam Serigne 6-yard pass from John Wolford (Mike Weaver kick), 13:39. Deacons 14–7. Drive: 5 plays, 49 yards, 2:10.
- ARMY – Angel Santiago 1-yard run (Daniel Grochowski kick), 9:26. Tied 14–14. Drive: 8 plays, 74 yards, 4:06.
- ARMY – Xavier Moss 4-yard pass from Joe Walker (Daniel Grochowski kick), 2:23. Black Knights 21–14. Drive: 9 plays, 68 yards, 4:28.

Third quarter

- No Scoring

Fourth quarter

- WFU – Mike Weaver 20-yard field goal, 14:13. Black Knights 21–17. Drive: 15 plays, 70 yards, 4:51.
- WFU – E.J. Scott 12-yard pass from John Wolford (Mike Weaver kick), 6:45. Deacons 24–21. Drive: 11 plays, 84 yards, 4:13.

Leading Passers

- ARMY – A. Santiago 2/4 Comp/Att 14 Yds
- WFU – J. Wolford 25/35 Comp/Att 238 Yds, 2 TD, 1 INT

Leading Rushers

- ARMY – A. Santiago 21 Rushes 123 Yds. 5.9 Avg 1 TD, 37 Lng.
- WFU – I. Robinson 17 Rushes 60 Yds. 3.5 Avg 1 TD, 15 Lng.

Leading Receivers

- ARMY – X. Moss 2 Rec. 9 Yds. 4.5 Avg 1 TD, 5 Lng.
- WFU – M. James 7 Rec. 64 Yds. 9.1 Avg 23 Lng.

Leading Tacklers

- ARMY – J. Timpf 7 Tack 1 Ast
- WFU – R. Janvion 10 Tack 2 Ast

=== Louisville ===
2nd meeting. 0–1 all time. Last meeting 2007 Orange Bowl, 24-13 Cardinals in Miami Gardens.

Week Five: Wake Forest Demon Deacons at Louisville Cardinals – Game summary

Quarter	1	2	3	4	Total
Demon Deacons	3	0	7	0	10
Cardinals	0	7	0	13	20

at Papa John's Cardinal Stadium, Louisville, Kentucky

- Date: September 27
- Game time: 3:30 p.m. EST
- Game weather: 81° F
- Game attendance: 51,463
- Referee: Jeff Heaser
- TV announcers (ESPNU): Clay Matvick and Anthony Becht
- Final Stats

Game information

First quarter

- WFU – Mike Weaver 43-yard field goal, 2:40. Demon Deacons 3-0. Drive: 5 plays, 26 yards, 1:03.

Second quarter

- LOU – Brandon Radcliff 29-yard run (John Wallace kick), 3:55. Cardinals 7–3. Drive: 5 plays, 80 yards, 2:30.

Third quarter

- WFU – Tylor Harris 0-yard fumble return (Mike Weaver kick), 8:32. Demon Deacons 10–7.

Fourth quarter

- LOU – Brandon Radcliff 16-yard run (John Wallace kick), 11:41. Cardinals 14–10. Drive: 10 plays, 69 yards, 4:46.
- LOU – John Wallace 31-yard field goal, 8:12. Cardinals 17-10. Drive: 5 plays, 51 yards, 2:02.
- LOU – John Wallace 34-yard field goal, 3:30. Cardinals 20-10. Drive: 5 plays, 22 yards, 2:57.

Leading Passers

- WFU – J. Wolford 19/34 Comp/Att 122 Yds, 3 INT
- LOU – R. Bonnafon 16/32 Comp/Att 206 Yds

Leading Rushers

- WFU – I. Robinson 5 Rushes 25 Yds. 5.0 Avg 15 Lng.
- LOU – B. Radcliff 17 Rushes 129 Yds. 7.6 Avg 2 TD, 29 Lng.

Leading Receivers

- WFU – C. Serigne 5 Rec. 46 Yds. 9.2 Avg 24 Lng.
- LOU – G. Christian 1 Rec. 45 Yds. 45.0 Avg 45 Lng.

Leading Tacklers

- WFU – Z. Allen 9 Tack 1 Ast 1 Sack
- LOU – B. Dubose 5 Tack 1 Sack

=== Florida State ===
33rd meeting. 6–25–1 all time. Last meeting 2013, 59-3 Seminoles in Winston-Salem.

Week Six: Wake Forest Demon Deacons at Florida State Seminoles – Game summary

Quarter	1	2	3	4	Total
Demon Deacons	3	0	0	0	3
Seminoles	0	13	17	13	43

at Doak Campbell Stadium, Tallahassee, Florida

- Date: October 4
- Game time: 3:30 p.m. EST
- Game weather: 77° F
- Game attendance: 82,327
- Referee: Jeff Flanagan
- TV announcers (ABC): Mike Patrick, Ed Cunningham, and Jeannine Edwards
- Final Stats

Game information

First quarter

- WFU – Mike Weaver 36-yard field goal, 1:20. Demon Deacons 3-0. Drive: 7 plays, 23 yards, 3:24.

Second quarter

- FSU – Roberto Aguayo 43-yard field goal, 11:46. Tied 3-3. Drive: 11 plays, 49 yards, 4:31.
- FSU – Jameis Winston 2-yard run (Roberto Aguayo kick), 1:03. Seminoles 10–3. Drive: 6 plays, 50 yards, 2:36.
- FSU – Roberto Aguayo 40-yard field goal, 0:00. Seminoles 13-3. Drive: 7 plays, 17 yards, 0:29.

Third quarter

- FSU – Roberto Aguayo 52-yard field goal, 12:08. Seminoles 16-3. Drive: 8 plays, 33 yards, 2:52.
- FSU – Mario Pender 3-yard run (Roberto Aguayo kick), 5:10. Seminoles 23–3. Drive: 2 plays, 9 yards, 0:33.
- FSU – Reggie Northrup 31-yard fumble return (Roberto Aguayo kick), 4:55. Seminoles 30–3.

Fourth quarter

- FSU – Roberto Aguayo 42-yard field goal, 13:22. Seminoles 33-3. Drive: 8 plays, 57 yards, 2:04.
- FSU – Travis Rudolph 59-yard pass from Jameis Winston (Roberto Aguayo kick), 9:10. Seminoles 40–3. Drive: 5 plays, 91 yards, 1:53.
- FSU – Roberto Aguayo 32-yard field goal, 4:53. Seminoles 43-3. Drive: 5 plays, 59 yards, 1:56.

Leading Passers

- WFU – J. Wolford 9/15 Comp/Att 58 Yds, 1 INT
- FSU – J. Winston 23/39 Comp/Att 297 Yds, 1 TD, 1 INT

Leading Rushers

- WFU – D. Wortham 12 Rushes 68 Yds. 5.7 Avg 17 Lng.
- FSU – M. Pender 5 Rushes 70 Yds. 14.0 Avg 1 TD, 56 Lng.

Leading Receivers

- WFU – E. Scott 4 Rec. 28 Yds. 7.0 Avg 8 Lng.
- FSU – E. Lane 2 Rec. 70 Yds. 35.0 Avg 59 Lng.

Leading Tacklers

- WFU – H. Williams 10 Tack 1 Sack
- FSU – R. Northrup 2 Tack 6 Ast

=== Syracuse ===
4th meeting. 1–2 all time. Last meeting 2013, 13-0 Orange in Syracuse.

Week Eight: Syracuse Orange at Wake Forest Demon Deacons – Game summary

Quarter	1	2	3	4	Total
Orange	3	14	13	0	30
Demon Deacons	7	0	0	0	7

at BB&T Field, Winston-Salem, North Carolina

- Date: October 18
- Game time: 12:00 p.m. EST
- Game weather: 68° F
- Game attendance: 25,107
- Referee: Walter Davenport
- TV announcers (RSN): Bob Rathbun, Coy Wire, and Olivia Harlan
- Final Stats

Game information

First quarter

- WFU – Cam Serigne 10-yard pass from John Wolford (Mike Weaver kick), 5:29. Deacons 7–0. Drive: 13 plays, 91 yards, 6:07.
- CUSE – Cole Murphy 32-yard field goal, 1:09. Deacons 7-3. Drive: 13 plays, 69 yards, 4:14.

Second quarter

- CUSE – AJ Long 4-yard run (Cole Murphy kick), 7:50. Orange 10–7. Drive: 15 plays, 92 yards, 6:26.
- CUSE – Robert Welsh 42-yard interception return (Cole Murphy kick), 5:05. Orange 17–7.

Third quarter

- CUSE – Cole Murphy 41-yard field goal, 11:07. Orange 20-7. Drive: 12 plays, 51 yards, 1:35.
- CUSE – Micah Robinson 51-yard fumble return (Cole Murphy kick), 9:27. Orange 27–7.
- CUSE – Cole Murphy 27-yard field goal, 5:15. Orange 30-7. Drive: 5 plays, 81 yards, 2:01.

Fourth quarter

- No Scoring

Leading Passers

- CUSE – A. Long 22/32 Comp/Att 171 Yds
- WFU – J. Wolford 9/14 Comp/Att 72 Yds, 1 TD, 1 INT

Leading Rushers

- CUSE – D. McFarlane 10 Rushes 114 Yds. 11.4 Avg 86 Lng.
- WFU – D. Wortham 19 Rushes 57 Yds. 3.0 Avg 13 Lng.

Leading Receivers

- CUSE – S. Ishmael 6 Rec. 72 Yds. 12.0 Avg 33 Lng.
- WFU – E. Scott 5 Rec. 48 Yds. 9.6 Avg 16 Lng.

Leading Tacklers

- CUSE – B. Reddish 6 Tack 1 Ast 1 Sack
- WFU – R. Janvion 8 Tack 4 Ast

=== Boston College ===
22nd meeting. 8–11–2 all time. Last meeting 2013, 24-10 Eagles in Chestnut Hill.

Week Nine: Boston College Eagles at Wake Forest Demon Deacons – Game summary

Quarter	1	2	3	4	Total
Eagles	10	7	0	6	23
Demon Deacons	0	0	3	14	17

at BB&T Field, Winston-Salem, North Carolina

- Date: October 25
- Game time: 3:30 p.m. EST
- Game weather: 73° F
- Game attendance: 26,439
- Referee: Pat Garvey
- TV announcers (RSN): James Bates, Coy Wire, and Olivia Harlan
- Final Stats

Game information

First quarter

- BC – Alex Howell 30-yard field goal, 7:23. Eagles 3-0. Drive: 14 plays, 67 yards, 7:37.
- BC – Jon Hilliman 33-yard run (Alex Howell kick), 0:00. Eagles 10–0. Drive: 8 plays, 80 yards, 4:04.

Second quarter

- BC – Jon Hilliman 1-yard run (Alex Howell kick), 1:15. Eagles 17–0. Drive: 8 plays, 58 yards, 3:44.

Third quarter

- WFU – Mike Weaver 28-yard field goal, 7:05. Eagles 17-3. Drive: 10 plays, 76 yards, 4:17.

Fourth quarter

- BC – Shakim Phillips 37-yard pass from Tyler Murphy (kick blocked), 13:46. Eagles 23–3. Drive: 3 plays, 81 yards, 1:08.
- WFU – E.J. Scott 3-yard run (Mike Weaver kick), 8:03. Eagles 23–10. Drive: 15 plays, 75 yards, 5:50.
- WFU – Isaiah Robinson 1-yard run (Mike Weaver kick), 6:26. Eagles 23–17. Drive: 4 plays, 15 yards, 1:30.

Leading Passers

- BC – T. Murphy 11/15 Comp/Att 165 Yds, 1 TD
- WFU – J. Wolford 22/30 Comp/Att 242 Yds, 1 INT

Leading Rushers

- BC – J. Hilliman 20 Rushes 101 Yds. 5.1 Avg 2 TD, 33 Lng.
- WFU – I. Robinson 8 Rushes 10 Yds. 1.3 Avg 1 TD, 5 Lng.

Leading Receivers

- BC – D. Dudeck 3 Rec. 58 Yds. 19.3 Avg 41 Lng.
- WFU – J. Crump 6 Rec. 60 Yds. 10.0 Avg 18 Lng.

Leading Tacklers

- BC – K. Kavalec 8 Tack 2 Ast 2 Sack
- WFU – R. Janvion 3 Tack 8 Ast

=== Clemson ===
80th meeting. 17–61–1 all time. Last meeting 2013, 56-7 Tigers in Clemson.

Week Eleven: Clemson Tigers at Wake Forest Demon Deacons – Game summary

Quarter	1	2	3	4	Total
#19 Tigers	0	17	3	14	34
Demon Deacons	7	10	0	3	20

at BB&T Field, Winston-Salem, North Carolina

- Date: November 6
- Game time: 7:30 p.m. EST
- Game weather: 59° F
- Game attendance: 28,846
- Referee: Gary Patterson
- TV announcers (ESPN): Rece Davis, Jesse Palmer, David Pollack, and Samantha Ponder
- Final Stats

Game information

First quarter

- WFU – Cam Serigne 4-yard pass from John Wolford (Mike Weaver kick), 1:09. Deacons 7–0. Drive: 5 plays, 43 yards, 1:47.

Second quarter

- CLM – Ammon Lakip 28-yard field goal, 8:49. Deacons 7-3. Drive: 8 plays, 60 yards, 3:40.
- CLM – Wayne Gallman 18-yard pass from Cole Stoudt (Ammon Lakip kick), 7:00. Tigers 10–7. Drive: 3 plays, 23 yards, 0:56.
- WFU – Cam Serigne 14-yard pass from John Wolford (Mike Weaver kick), 4:31. Deacons 14–10. Drive: 2 plays, 13 yards, 0:30.
- CLM – Artavis Scott 4-yard pass from Cole Stoudt (Ammon Lakip kick), 0:27. Tigers 17–14. Drive: 12 plays, 75 yards, 4:04.
- WFU – Mike Weaver 50-yard field goal, 0:00. Tied 17-17. Drive: 3 plays, 30 yards, 0:27.

Third quarter

- CLM – Ammon Lakip 39-yard field goal, 10:11. Tigers 20-17. Drive: 12 plays, 54 yards, 4:49.

Fourth quarter

- WFU – Mike Weaver 31-yard field goal, 11:08. Tied 20-20. Drive: 7 plays, 40 yards, 3:36.
- CLM – Artavis Scott 68-yard pass from Cole Stoudt (Ammon Lakip kick), 10:53. Tigers 27–20. Drive: 1 plays, 68 yards, 0:15.
- CLM – Wayne Gallman 30-yard run (Ammon Lakip kick), 6:36. Tigers 34–20. Drive: 9 plays, 72 yards, 3:55.

Leading Passers

- CLM – C. Stoudt 27/42 Comp/Att 282 Yds, 3 TD, 1 INT
- WFU – J. Wolford 11/29 Comp/Att 88 Yds, 2 TD

Leading Rushers

- CLM – W. Gallman 19 Rushes 106 Yds. 5.6 Avg 1 TD, 30 Lng.
- WFU – D. Wortham 8 Rushes 30 Yds. 3.8 Avg 20 Lng.

Leading Receivers

- CLM – A. Scott 8 Rec. 122 Yds. 15.3 Avg 2 TD, 68 Lng.
- WFU – C. Serigne 3 Rec. 34 Yds. 11.3 Avg 2 TD, 16 Lng.

Leading Tacklers

- CLM – S. Anthony 6 Tack 2 Ast
- WFU – R. Janvion 6 Tack 3 Ast

=== NC State ===
108th meeting. 38–63–6 all time. Last meeting 2013, 28-13 Deacons in Winston-Salem.

Week Twelve: Wake Forest Demon Deacons at NC State Wolfpack – Game summary

Quarter	1	2	3	4	Total
Demon Deacons	3	0	3	7	13
Wolfpack	7	14	21	0	42

at Carter–Finley Stadium, Raleigh, North Carolina

- Date: November 15
- Game time: 3:00 p.m. EST
- Game weather: 46° F
- Game attendance: 55,353
- Referee: Duane Heydt
- TV announcers (RSN): Wes Durham, James Bates, and Jenn Hildreth
- Final Stats

Game information

First quarter

- NCST – Tony Creecy 2-yard run (Niklas Sade kick), 9:07. Wolfpack 7–0. Drive: 10 plays, 69 yards, 4:15.
- WFU – Mike Weaver 32-yard field goal, 0:42. Wolfpack 7-3. Drive: 15 plays, 62 yards, 5:50.

Second quarter

- NCST – Matt Dayes 1-yard run (Niklas Sade kick), 11:06. Wolfpack 14–3. Drive: 5 plays, 74 yards, 1:27.
- NCST – Matt Dayes 7-yard pass from Jacoby Brissett (Niklas Sade kick), 1:21. Wolfpack 21–3. Drive: 10 plays, 72 yards, 2:39.

Third quarter

- NCST – Bryan Underwood 75-yard run (Niklas Sade kick), 14:41. Wolfpack 28–3. Drive: 1 plays, 75 yards, 0:14.
- WFU – Mike Weaver 39-yard field goal, 9:58. Wolfpack 28-6. Drive: 11 plays, 54 yards, 4:43.
- NCST – Shadrach Thornton 1-yard run (Niklas Sade kick), 7:06. Wolfpack 35–6. Drive: 4 plays, 46 yards, 1:18.
- NCST – Matt Dayes 2-yard run (Niklas Sade kick), 1:29. Wolfpack 42–6. Drive: 9 plays, 66 yards, 4:14.

Fourth quarter

- WFU – Isaiah Robinson 4-yard run (Mike Weaver kick), 8:36. Wolfpack 42–13. Drive: 16 plays, 76 yards, 7:47.

Leading Passers

- WFU – J. Wolford 15/32 Comp/Att 161 Yds
- NCST – J. Brissett 8/19 Comp/Att 83 Yds, 1 TD

Leading Rushers

- WFU – D. Wortham 12 Rushes 34 Yds. 2.8 Avg 9 Lng.
- NCST – S. Thornton 16 Rushes 110 Yds. 6.9 Avg 1 TD, 43 Lng.

Leading Receivers

- WFU – E. Scott 5 Rec. 50 Yds. 10.0 Avg 29 Lng.
- NCST – M. Dayes 4 Rec. 47 Yds. 11.8 Avg 1 TD, 36 Lng.

Leading Tacklers

- WFU – B. Chubb 4 Tack 4 Ast
- NCST – M. Rose 3 Tack 3 Ast

=== Virginia Tech ===
Week Thirteen: Virginia Tech Hokies at Wake Forest Demon Deacons – Game summary

Quarter	1	2	3	4	OT	2OT	Total
Hokies	0	0	0	0	3	0	3
Demon Deacons	0	0	0	0	3	3	6

at BB&T Field, Winston-Salem, North Carolina

- Date: November 22
- Game time: 12:30 p.m. EST
- Game weather: 46° F
- Game attendance: 27,820
- Referee: Riley Johnson
- TV announcers (ACC Network): Tim Brant, David Archer, and Dave Goren
- Final Stats

Game information

First quarter

- No Scoring plays

Second quarter

- No Scoring plays

Third quarter

- No Scoring plays

Fourth quarter

- No Scoring plays

Overtime

- WAKE – Mike Weaver 49-yard field goal, 0:00. Demon Deacons 3-0. Drive: 4 plays, -6 yards.
- VT – Joey Slye 28-yard field goal, 0:00. Tied 3-3. Drive: 6 plays, 15 yards.

Second Overtime

- WAKE – Mike Weaver 39-yard field goal, 0:00. Demon Deacons 6-3. Drive: 4 plays, 4 yards.

Top Passers

- VT – Michael Brewer – 15/28, 126 yards, INT
- WAKE – John Wolford – 18/32, 160 yards, INT

Top rushers

- VT – J. C. Coleman – 18 rushes, 98 yards
- WAKE – E. J. Scott – 1 rush, 26 yards

Top receivers

- VT – Bucky Hodges – 4 receptions, 39 yards
- WAKE – Cam Serigne – 6 receptions, 74 yards

The game was the first since 2005 to end in a regulation scoreless tie.

=== Duke ===
95th meeting. 37–55–2 all time. Last meeting 2013, 28-21 Blue Devils in Winston-Salem.

Week Fourteen: Wake Forest Demon Deacons at Duke Blue Devils – Game summary

Quarter	1	2	3	4	Total
Demon Deacons	7	7	7	0	21
Blue Devils	21	6	7	7	41

at Wallace Wade Stadium, Durham, North Carolina

- Date: November 29
- Game time: 7:00 p.m. EST
- Game weather: 41° F
- Game attendance: 22,247
- Referee: Duane Heydt
- TV announcers (ESPNU): Anish Shroff, Gene Chizik, and Cara Capuano
- Final Stats

Game information

First quarter

- DUKE – Anthony Boone 4-yard run (Ross Martin kick), 12:06. Blue Devils 7–0. Drive: 8 plays, 47 yards, 2:54.
- WFU – Jared Crump 27-yard pass from John Wolford (Mike Weaver kick), 8:53. Tied 7–7. Drive: 6 plays, 41 yards, 3:13.
- DUKE – Shaun Wilson 8-yard run (Ross Martin kick), 4:14. Blue Devils 14–7. Drive: 5 plays, 26 yards, 2:20.
- DUKE – Jamison Crowder 52-yard pass from Anthony Boone (Ross Martin kick), 4:05. Blue Devils 21–7. Drive: 1 plays, 52 yards, 0:09.

Second quarter

- DUKE – Ross Martin 45-yard field goal, 10:47. Blue Devils 24-7. Drive: 14 plays, 59 yards, 5:21.
- WFU – Cam Serigne 17-yard pass from John Wolford (Mike Weaver kick), 1:43. Blue Devils 24–14. Drive: 7 plays, 68 yards, 3:50.
- DUKE – Ross Martin 28-yard field goal, 0:39. Blue Devils 27-14. Drive: 8 plays, 55 yards, 1:04.

Third quarter

- WFU – Brandon Terry 40-yard pass from John Wolford (Mike Weaver kick), 11:23. Blue Devils 27–21. Drive: 8 plays, 80 yards, 3:37.
- DUKE – Casey Blaser 0-yard fumble return (Ross Martin kick), 6:46. Blue Devils 34–21. Drive: 9 plays, 78 yards, 4:37.

Fourth quarter

- DUKE – David Reeves 18-yard pass from Thomas Sirk (Ross Martin kick), 6:02. Blue Devils 41–21. Drive: 14 plays, 77 yards, 6:06.

Leading Passers

- WFU – J. Wolford 24/36 Comp/Att 251 Yds, 3 TD
- DUKE – A. Boone 19/31 Comp/Att 275 Yds, 1 TD

Leading Rushers

- WFU – J. Garside 1 Rushes 28 Yds. 28.0 Avg 28 Lng.
- DUKE – S. Powell 16 Rushes 63 Yds. 3.9 Avg 14 Lng.

Leading Receivers

- WFU – M. James 9 Rec. 87 Yds. 9.7 Avg 17 Lng.
- DUKE – I. Blakeney 7 Rec. 107 Yds. 15.3 Avg 35 Lng.

Leading Tacklers

- WFU – B. Chubb 6 Tack 13 Ast
- DUKE – D. Edwards 7 Tack 6 Ast 1 Sack

== Statistics ==
=== Scores by quarter ===
	1	2	3	4	OT	Total
Wake Forest	54	33	44	41	6	178
Opponents	55	114	78	67	3	317

=== Offense ===
==== Rushing ====
Name	GP	Att	Yards	Avg	TD	Long	Avg/G
Dezmond Wortham	8	83	241	2.9	0	20	30.1
Isaiah Robinson	12	99	174	1.8	3	15	14.5
Orville Reynolds	9	69	170	2.5	0	36	18.9
E.J. Scott	12	6	39	6.5	1	26	3.2
Jordan Garside	12	3	28	9.3	0	28	2.3
Kevin Sousa	4	5	10	2.0	0	11	2.5
Tyler Henderson	6	3	4	1.3	0	3	0.7
Jared Crump	12	1	2	2.0	0	2	0.2
Alex Kinal	1	1	-12	-12.0	0	-12	-1.0
Tyler Cameron	3	7	-15	-2.1	0	14	-5.0
John Wolford	12	104	-151	-1.5	0	9	-12.6
TEAM	7	2	-11	-5.5	0	0	-1.6
Demon Deacons Total	12	383	479	1.3	4	36	39.9
Opponents	12	501	2,192	4.4	20	86	182.7

==== Passing ====
Name	GP	Cmp–Att	Pct	Yds	TD	INT	Lng	Avg/G	RAT
John Wolford	12	214-367	58.3	2,037	12	14	46	169.8	108.09
Tyler Cameron	3	10-16	62.5	55	0	0	10	18.3	91.38
Jared Crump	12	1-1	100.0	24	0	0	24	2.0	301.60
Kevin Sousa	4	0-1	0.0	0	0	0	0	0.0	000.00
Demon Deacons Total	12	225-385	58.4	2,116	12	14	46	176.3	107.62
Opponents	12	211-348	60.6	2,239	12	6	68	186.6	122.61

==== Receiving ====
Name	GP	Rec	Yds	Avg	TD	Long	Avg/G
Cam Serigne	12	54	531	9.8	5	32	44.2
E.J. Scott	12	50	513	10.3	4	36	42.8
Matt James	9	40	401	10.0	0	36	44.6
Jared Crump	12	32	339	10.6	1	28	28.2
Orville Reynolds	9	11	28	2.5	0	7	3.1
Isaiah Robinson	12	9	30	3.3	1	6	2.5
Jonathan Williams	8	8	104	13.0	0	46	13.0
Brandon Terry	10	7	93	13.3	1	40	9.3
Devin Pike	12	7	34	4.9	0	11	2.8
Dezmond Wortham	8	6	19	3.2	0	6	2.4
John Wolford	12	1	24	24.0	0	24	2.0
Demon Deacons Total	12	225	2,116	9.4	12	46	176.3
Opponents	12	211	2,239	10.6	12	68	186.6

==== Scoring ====
Name	TD	FG	PAT	2PT PAT	SAFETY	TOT PTS
Mike Weaver		15-19	19-19			64
E.J. Scott	5					30
Cam Serigne	5					30
Isaiah Robinson	4					24
Josh Banks	1					6
Jared Crump	1					6
Tylor Harris	1					6
Kevin Johnson	1					6
Brandon Terry	1					6

== 2015 NFL draftees ==
Player	Round	Pick	Position	NFL Club
Kevin Johnson	1	16	Cornerback	Houston Texans
