= Riverside High School (South Carolina) =

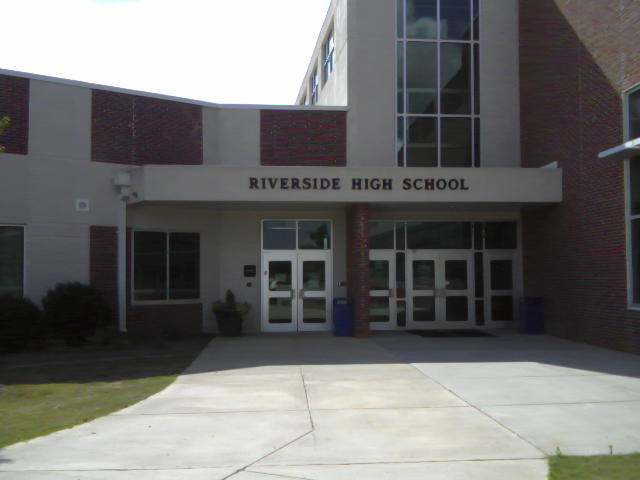
- Front entrance to Riverside High School in 2010.

Location
- 794 Hammett Bridge Road; Greer, South Carolina 29650; United States; 34.904630°N 82.255600°W

Information
- Type: Public high school
- Motto: Reaching Higher Standards
- Established: 1973 (53 years ago)
- Principal: Darah Huffman
- Teaching staff: 93.40 (FTE)
- Grades: 9–12
- Gender: Co-educational
- Enrollment: 1,816 (2023-2024)
- Student to teacher ratio: 19.44
- Colors: Red and royal blue
- Mascot: Warrior
- Yearbook: Saskamow
- Affiliations: Greenville County School District
- Website: www.greenville.k12.sc.us/riverside/

Riverside High School is a public high school in Greer, South Carolina. Riverside High School was founded in 1973.

== History ==
The school opened in the fall of 1973 with 650 students on a 65-acre (260,000 m^{2}) campus. Riverside was named the 1998 Palmetto's Finest High School.

In Fall 2006, students began attending a brand new building on the same premises. As an official green building, it is one of the most energy efficient and environmentally-friendly high schools in the nation and approximately 278,111 square feet (25,837.4 m^{2}).

The school has had five principals: John Durr, Wayne Rhodes, Charles "Bob" Bayne, Andrew "Andy" Crowley, and, currently, Darah Huffman.

== Athletics ==
Riverside moved from Class AAA to Class AAAA following the 2009–2010 school year. Riverside then jumped to Class 5-A for the 2016–2017 school year.

=== State championships ===
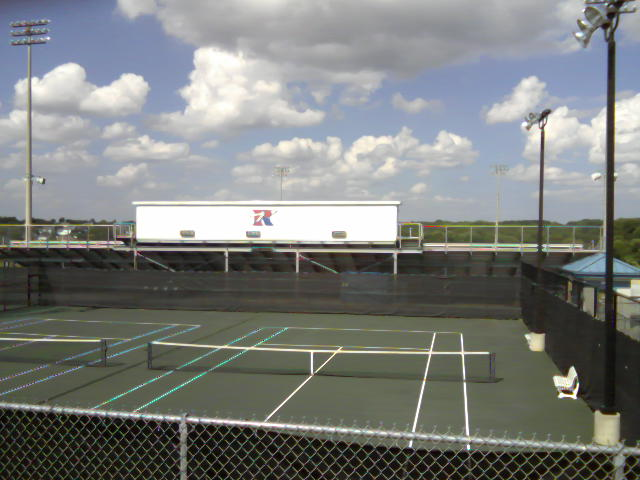
The tennis courts at Riverside High in 2010. The stadium is in the background with the current Riverside logo.

- Baseball: 1980, 1986, 1999, 2003, 2004, 2006
- Basketball - Boys: 1984, 1985, 1988
- Basketball - Girls: 2024
- Cross Country - Boys: 1987, 1988, 1989, 1990, 1991, 1992, 1993, 1994, 1995, 1996, 1997, 2014, 2016
- Cross Country - Girls: 1995, 1996, 1997, 1998, 2001, 2013, 2014, 2015, 2016, 2017
- Golf - Boys: 1999, 2000
- Golf - Girls: 2007, 2008
- Lacrosse - Girls: 2021
- Soccer - Boys: 1987, 1989, 1990, 1991, 1992, 1993, 1994, 1995, 2000, 2001, 2006, 2008, 2021, 2022, 2023, 2024
- Soccer - Girls: 1991, 1992, 1993, 1994, 1995, 1996, 1997, 1999, 2001, 2004, 2006, 2009, 2010
- Softball: 1995, 1996, 1997
- Swimming - Boys: 2004, 2008, 2009, 2013, 2014, 2015, 2016
- Swimming - Girls: 2001, 2002, 2003, 2004, 2005, 2006, 2007, 2009, 2013, 2014, 2015, 2016
- Tennis - Boys: 1983, 1990, 1992, 2024
- Tennis - Girls: 1999
- Track - Boys: 1986, 1988, 1991

== Notable alumni ==
- Brandon Bennett (1991) — NFL running back
- Kevin Dodd (2011) — NFL defensive end
- Bill Haas (2000) — professional golfer
- Jon Kirksey (1989) — NFL defensive tackle
- Michael Roth (2008) — former MLB pitcher, college baseball pitcher at the University of South Carolina and two-time NCAA champion
- Tremayne Stephens (1994) — NFL running back
