= Zac Brooks =

American football player (born 1993)

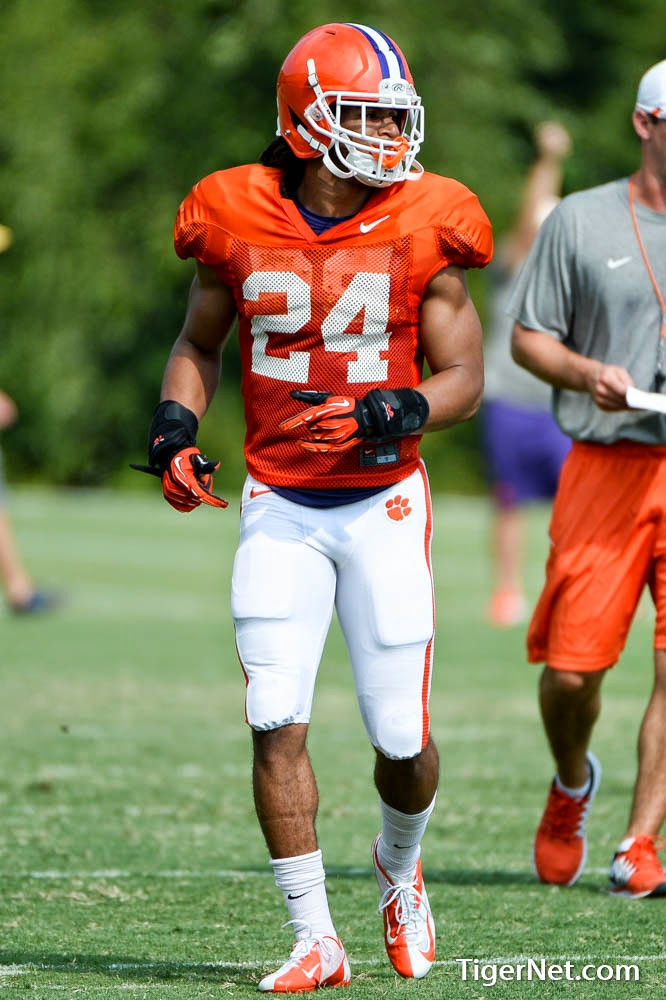
- Brooks with the Clemson Tigers in 2014

Profile
- Position: Running back

Personal information
- Born: February 1, 1993 (age 33); Jonesboro, Arkansas, U.S.
- Listed height: 6 ft 0 in (1.83 m)
- Listed weight: 200 lb (91 kg)

Career information
- High school: Jonesboro (AR)
- College: Clemson
- NFL draft: 2016: 7th round, 247th overall pick

Career history
- Seattle Seahawks (2016)*; Kansas City Chiefs (2016)*; Seattle Seahawks (2016)*; Denver Broncos (2016–2017)*
- * Offseason or practice squad member only
- Stats at Pro Football Reference

Zac Brooks (born February 1, 1993) is an American former football running back. He played college football at Clemson and was selected by the Seattle Seahawks in the seventh round of the 2016 NFL draft. He also spent time with the Kansas City Chiefs and Denver Broncos.

== Early life ==
Brooks attended Jonesboro High School in Jonesboro, Arkansas where he completed high school early, in December 2011, to attend college at Clemson University and returned to Jonesboro High School to graduate in 2012 with his senior class.

== College career ==
Brooks committed to the Clemson on June 20, 2011, and enrolled on January 20, 2012. Brooks was enrolled at Clemson for four year playing in the 2012, 2013, and 2015 seasons and redshirting the 2014 due to a foot injury. In his college career, Brooks played in 33 games with 115 carries for 599 yards and 8 total rushing and receiving touchdowns.

== Professional career ==
=== Seattle Seahawks ===
On April 30, 2016, Brooks was selected by the Seattle Seahawks in the seventh round of the 2016 NFL draft. On May 9, the Seahawks announced that they had signed Brooks to his rookie contract. On August 30, he was waived by the Seahawks. Brooks was re-signed to the team's practice squad on September 27. He was released by the Seahawks on October 25.

=== Kansas City Chiefs ===
On October 27, 2016, Brooks was signed to the Kansas City Chiefs' practice squad. He was released by the Chiefs on November 8.

=== Seattle Seahawks (second stint) ===
On November 23, 2016, Brooks was signed to the Seattle Seahawks' practice squad. He was released by the Seahawks on November 29.

=== Denver Broncos ===
On December 14, 2016, Brooks was signed to the Denver Broncos' practice squad. He signed a reserve/future contract with the Broncos on January 2, 2017.

On April 20, 2017, Brooks announced his retirement from the NFL after just one season without playing in a regular-season game.

== Personal life ==
Brooks has aspirations to become an interior designer.
