= Charone Peake =

American football player (born 1992)

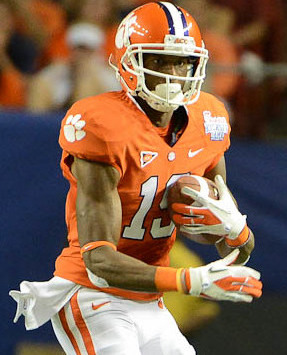
- Peake with the Clemson Tigers in 2012

No. 17
- Position: Wide receiver

Personal information
- Born: October 16, 1992 (age 34); Moore, South Carolina, U.S.
- Listed height: 6 ft 2 in (1.88 m)
- Listed weight: 209 lb (95 kg)

Career information
- High school: Paul M. Dorman (Roebuck, South Carolina)
- College: Clemson (2011–2015)
- NFL draft: 2016: 7th round, 241st overall pick

Career history
- New York Jets (2016–2018); Jacksonville Jaguars (2020)*; Saskatchewan Roughriders (2021)*; Ottawa Redblacks (2021)
- * Offseason or practice squad member only

Career NFL statistics
- Receptions: 22
- Receiving yards: 214
- Total touchdowns: 1
- Stats at Pro Football Reference
- Stats at CFL.ca

Charone Eric Peake (born October 16, 1992) is an American former professional football player who was a wide receiver in the National Football League (NFL) and Canadian Football League (CFL). He played college football for the Clemson Tigers. Peake was selected by the New York Jets in the seventh round of the 2016 NFL draft.

== Early life ==
Peake played both the U.S. Army All-American game and Shrine Bowl. He was a USA Today Second-team All-American and ranked the 14th overall player in the nation by ESPN. Peake was rated as 50th overall player in the nation by 247Sports.com. Peake was also ranked the 73rd player in the nation by Scout.com, ranked 66th overall player in the nation by Sporting News and was ranked as the 83rd overall player in the nation by Rivals.com. Peake was a finalist for Mr. Football in South Carolina where he helped his Dorman High School football team to the state championship game. In his senior season at high school, Peake had 65 receptions for 1,053 yards and nine receiving touchdowns and had 18 carries for 120 rushing yards. Peake was named region Male Student-Athlete-of-the-Year in senior season. In his senior season at high school, Peake 52 receptions for 881 receiving yards and nine receiving touchdowns and 41 carries for 319 rushing yards. He had 19 catches for 300 receiving yards in his sophomore season.

== College career ==
Peake was named to the Biletnikoff Award Watch List member prior to the preseason of his junior season. Peake was named to Atlantic Coast Conference (ACC) Academic Honor Roll at Clemson University in his junior season.

== Professional career ==
=== Pre-draft ===
On January 21, 2016, it was announced that Peake would be playing in the 2016 Senior Bowl. Throughout the week leading up to the Senior Bowl, Peake impressed many team representatives and scouts and was praised for his route running ability and speed. On January 30, 2016, Peake caught two passes for 13-yards and helped Jacksonville Jaguars head coach Gus Bradley's South team that defeated the North 27–13. He was one of 43 collegiate wide receivers to receive an invitation to the NFL Scouting Combine in Indianapolis, Indiana. Peake completed all of the combine drills and ran the sixth fastest 40-yard dash time among all wide receivers. On March 10, 2016, Peake opted to participate at Clemson's pro day, along with Kevin Dodd, Mackensie Alexander, T. J. Green, Jayron Kearse, Shaq Lawson, and then others. Team representatives and scouts from all 32 NFL team attended, including head coaches Rex Ryan (Buffalo Bills), Marvin Lewis (Cincinnati Bengals), Mike Tomlin (Pittsburgh Steelers), and Chuck Pagano (Indianapolis Colts), as Peake performed positional drills and also chose to run the 40-yard dash (4.38s), 20-yard dash (2.55s), and 10-yard dash (1.50s). Peake's unofficial time of 4.38 in the 40-yard dash would've finished third among all receivers at the NFL combine, behind Notre Dame's Will Fuller and TCU's Kolby Listenbee. Although he experienced a few drops during receiving drills, Peake's overall performance was still well received by scouts and draft analysts. At the conclusion of the pre-draft process, Peake was projected to be a third or fourth round pick by NFL draft experts and scouts. He was ranked the 15th beat wide receiver prospect by WalterFootball.com and the 16th best wide receiver in the draft by NFLDraftScout.com.

Pre-draft measurables
Height	Weight	Arm length	Hand span	40-yard dash	10-yard split	20-yard split	20-yard shuttle	Three-cone drill	Vertical jump	Broad jump	Bench press
6 ft 2 3/8 in (1.89 m)	209 lb (95 kg)	34 in (0.86 m)	9 1/4 in (0.23 m)	4.45 s	1.63 s	2.65 s	4.46 s	6.96 s	35 1/2 in (0.90 m)	10 ft 2 in (3.10 m)	12 reps
All values from NFL Combine

=== New York Jets ===
==== 2016 ====
The New York Jets selected Peake in the seventh round (241st overall) of the 2016 NFL draft. Peake was the 32nd wide receiver selected in 2016. He unexpectedly fell in the draft, although he was projected to be a third round pick by NFL.com and a third or fourth by CBS Sports. On May 12, 2016, the Jets signed Peake to a four-year, $2.40 million contract that includes a signing bonus of $68,382.

Throughout training camp, he competed for a roster spot against Quincy Enunwa, Kenbrell Thompkins, Kyle Williams, Chandler Worthy, Jeremy Ross, Titus Davis, Robby Anderson, and Jalin Marshall. Head coach Todd Bowles named him the sixth wide receiver on the depth chart, behind Brandon Marshall, Eric Decker, Jalin Marshall, Enunwa, and Anderson.

He made his professional regular season debut in the Jets' season-opening 23–22 loss to the Bengals. On October 2, 2016, Peake scored his first professional touchdown in an unusual occurrence when Jets' quarterback Ryan Fitzpatrick fumbled the ball forward to Peake, who recovered it and ran 40-yards for the a touchdown. He also made his first career reception on a 16-yard pass by Ryan Fitzpatrick in the second quarter and finished with three catches for 30-yards in their 27–17 loss to the Seattle Seahawks. He earned his first playing time on offense due to injuries to Decker and Jalin Marshall. On October 17, 2016, Peake caught a season-high five passes for 43-yards during a 28–3 loss at the Arizona Cardinals. In Week 9, Peake earned his first career start during a 27–23 loss to the Miami Dolphins. Peake was inactive for a Week 12 matchup against the New England Patriots. He finished the 2016 season with 19 receptions for 186 receiving yards in 15 games and one start.

==== 2017 ====
Peake entered training camp competing for one of the starting wide receiver jobs after the departures of Brandon Marshall and Decker on free agency. He competed against Anderson, ArDarius Stewart, Chad Hansen, Myles White, and Frank Hammond. Head coach Todd Bowles named him the Jets' fourth wide receiver on the depth chart after they traded the Seattle Seahawks for Jermaine Kearse and signed Jeremy Kerley.

On September 24, 2017, Peake suffered an ankle.injury during the Jets' 20–6 victory over the Dolphins. On September 27, 2017, the Jets placed Peake on injured reserve.

On August 31, 2019, Peake was released by the Jets.

=== Jacksonville Jaguars ===
On January 2, 2020, Peake signed a reserve/future contract with the Jaguars. He was released on April 27, 2020.

=== Saskatchewan Roughriders ===
Peake signed with the Saskatchewan Roughriders of the Canadian Football League (CFL) on January 8, 2021. He was released among the final training camp cuts on July 30, 2021.

=== Ottawa Redblacks ===
On August 2, 2021, it was announced that Peake had signed with the Ottawa Redblacks of the CFL. He was released on February 14, 2023.
