= Kevin Dodd =

American football player (born 1992)

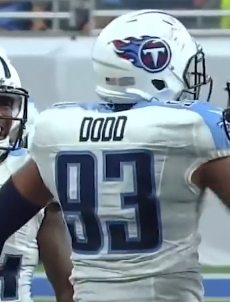
- Dodd with the Tennessee Titans in 2016

No. 93, 92
- Position: Linebacker

Personal information
- Born: July 14, 1992 (age 34); Taylors, South Carolina, U.S.
- Listed height: 6 ft 5 in (1.96 m)
- Listed weight: 277 lb (126 kg)

Career information
- High school: Riverside (Greer, South Carolina)
- College: Clemson (2012–2015)
- NFL draft: 2016: 2nd round, 33rd overall pick

Career history
- Tennessee Titans (2016–2017)

Career NFL statistics
- Total tackles: 12
- Sacks: 1
- Stats at Pro Football Reference

Kevin Tyrell Dodd (born July 14, 1992) is an American former professional football player who was a linebacker for the Tennessee Titans of the National Football League (NFL). He played college football for the Clemson Tigers and was selected by the Titans in the second round of the 2016 NFL draft.

== Early life ==
Dodd attended Riverside High School in Greer, South Carolina. As a senior, he had 78 tackles and nine sacks. Dodd committed to Clemson University to play college football, but spent a year at Hargrave Military Academy after graduating from high school.

== College career ==
Dodd played in 24 games and had 20 tackles as a backup his first three years at Clemson from 2012 to 2014. In 2015, Dodd became a starter for the first time and recorded 60 tackles and 12 sacks. During Clemson's loss to Alabama in the 2016 College Football Playoff National Championship, he had seven tackles and three sacks.

== Professional career ==
Pre-draft measurables
Height	Weight	Arm length	Hand span	40-yard dash	10-yard split	20-yard split	20-yard shuttle	Three-cone drill	Vertical jump	Broad jump	Bench press
6 ft 5 in (1.96 m)	277 lb (126 kg)	34 in (0.86 m)	10 in (0.25 m)	4.86 s	1.70 s	2.84 s	4.44 s	7.18 s	30.5 in (0.77 m)	9 ft 2 in (2.79 m)	22 reps
All values from NFL Combine and Pro Day

Dodd was selected by the Tennessee Titans in the second round (33rd overall) of the 2016 NFL draft. He recorded his first sack in his first full start against the Detroit Lions in Week 2 after replacing an injured Derrick Morgan. Dodd was placed on injured reserve on December 5, 2016 after re-injuring his foot from early in the offseason.

Dodd finished the 2017 season with seven tackles and no sacks.

On July 24, 2018, Dodd was waived by the Titans after failing to report to training camp.
