= Marion Hobby =

American football player and coach (born 1966)

Indianapolis Colts
- Title: Defensive line coach

Personal information
- Born: November 7, 1966 (age 59); Irondale, Alabama, U.S.
- Listed height: 6 ft 4 in (1.93 m)
- Listed weight: 277 lb (126 kg)

Career information
- High school: Shades Valley (Irondale)
- College: Tennessee
- NFL draft: 1990: 3rd round, 74th overall pick

Career history

Playing
- Minnesota Vikings (1990)*; New England Patriots (1990–1992)
- * Offseason or practice squad member only

Coaching
- Tennessee–Martin (1995) Strength and conditioning coach; Louisiana–Lafayette (1996–1997) Defensive tackles/strength and conditioning coach; Tennessee (1998) Assistant strength and conditioning coach; Ole Miss (1999–2004) Defensive line coach; Clemson (2005) Defensive ends coach; New Orleans Saints (2006–2007) Defensive ends coach; Duke (2008–2010) Defensive coordinator/defensive line coach; Clemson (2011–2016) Co-defensive coordinator/defensive ends coach; Jacksonville Jaguars (2017–2018) Defensive line coach; Miami Dolphins (2019–2020) Defensive line coach; Cincinnati Bengals (2021–2024) Defensive line coach; Tennessee (2025) Defensive analyst; Indianapolis Colts (2026–present) Defensive line coach

Awards and highlights
- CFP national champion (2016); First-team All-SEC (1989)

Career NFL statistics
- Sacks: 5
- Fumble recoveries: 1
- Stats at Pro Football Reference

Marion Eugene Hobby Jr. (born November 7, 1966) is an American football coach who currently serves as the defensive line coach for the Indianapolis Colts of the National Football League (NFL). Prior to that, he was the defensive line coach for the Cincinnati Bengals of the NFL.

== Playing career ==
Hobby played college football at the University of Tennessee under head coach Johnny Majors. While at Tennessee he was a three-year starter and a First-team All-SEC pick in 1989. He was also named to Tennessee's 100th anniversary team.

Pre-draft measurables
| Height | Weight | Arm length | Hand span | 40-yard dash | 10-yard split | 20-yard split | 20-yard shuttle | Vertical jump | Broad jump | Bench press |
|---|---|---|---|---|---|---|---|---|---|---|
| 6 ft 4 in (1.93 m) | 277 lb (126 kg) | 33 1/8 in (0.84 m) | 9 7/8 in (0.25 m) | 5.28 s | 1.86 s | 3.00 s | 4.73 s | 27.0 in (0.69 m) | 8 ft 5 in (2.57 m) | 11 reps |
All values from NFL Combine

He was drafted in the third round of 1990 NFL draft with the 74th overall pick by the Minnesota Vikings. The Vikings traded him to the New England Patriots, where he played for three seasons.

== Coaching career ==
Hobby started coaching in 1995 at the University of Tennessee-Martin as a strength and conditioning coach. Over the next few years he coached Louisiana-Lafayette, and Tennessee. He spent five seasons as the defensive line coach for Ole Miss between 1999 and 2004. Hobby coached the defensive ends for the Clemson Tigers for the 2005 season before spending the next two seasons with the New Orleans Saints the same position. He would serve as the Duke assistant head coach, defensive coordinator, and defensive line coach under head coach David Cutcliffe for three seasons before he made a return to Clemson. He served as co-defensive coordinator and defensive ends coach from 2011 to 2016 under head coach Dabo Swinney, where he won a national championship in 2016. In January 2017, the Jacksonville Jaguars hired Marion Hobby as defensive line coach.

On February 8, 2019, the Miami Dolphins announced Hobby as their defensive line coach. He missed the team's weeks 9 and 10 games against the Arizona Cardinals and Los Angeles Chargers on November 8 and 15, 2020, in accordance with COVID-19 protocols. On January 7, 2021, the Dolphins announced that Hobby and the team had mutually agreed to part ways.

On January 16, 2021, the Cincinnati Bengals announced that Hobby would be their defensive line coach. He was fired by the team on January 6, 2025.

On June 9, 2025, the University of Tennessee announced that he would join the staff as a defensive analyst.

On February 23, 2026, the Indianapolis Colts announced that Hobby would join their coaching staff as the team's defensive line coach. He had previously worked with the Colts' defensive coordinator Lou Anarumo from 2021-24 with the Bengals.

== Personal life ==
Hobby graduated with a bachelor's degree from University of Tennessee in 1995. He and his wife Constance have three daughters, Maria, Mariah, and Camille.
