= Zac Alley =

American football coach

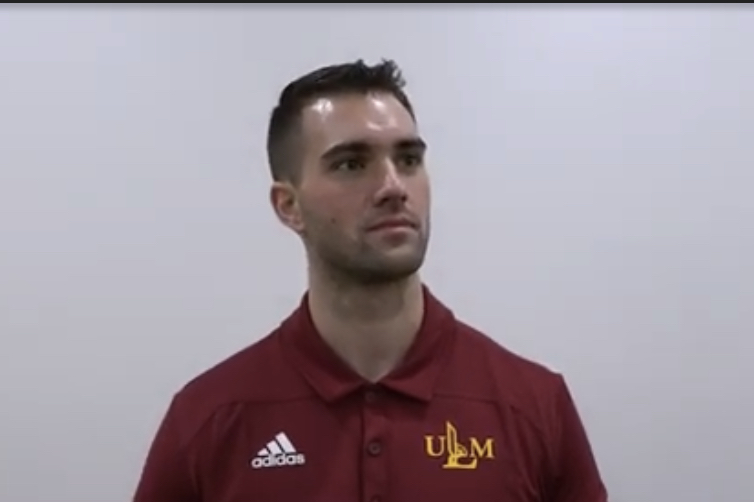

Current position
- Title: Assistant head coach and defensive coordinator
- Team: WVU
- Conference: Big 12

Biographical details
- Education: Clemson University

Coaching career (HC unless noted)
- 2011–2014: Clemson (SA)
- 2015–2018: Clemson (GA)
- 2019: Boise State (ILB)
- 2020: Boise State (OLB/co-ST)
- 2021: Louisiana–Monroe (DC/LB)
- 2022–2023: Jacksonville State (DC/LB)
- 2024: Oklahoma (DC/LB)
- 2025–present: West Virginia (AHC/DC/LB)

Zachary Alley is an American football coach who is currently the Assistant head coach and defensive coordinator at West Virginia. Alley won two national championships as a graduate assistant at Clemson University.

== Coaching career ==
=== Clemson ===
After graduating from Charlotte Country Day School, where he played on both the defensive and offensive lines, Alley went to Clemson. Alley began his coaching career as a student assistant his freshman year in 2011 and worked as an assistant his entire time as a student at Clemson. Once he graduated he became a graduate assistant from 2015 to 2018, where he won two national championships under Dabo Swinney.

=== Boise State ===
A month after he was signed to be the nickels coach for the Charlotte 49ers, Alley became the inside linebackers coach for the Broncos for the 2019 season. For the 2020 season he coached the outside linebackers while also being the co-special teams coordinator. During the season Alley contracted COVID-19.

=== ULM ===
Under the recommendation of Brent Venables, Alley was hired by Terry Bowden to be the defensive coordinator for the Warhawks in 2021. Only being 27 years old he was the youngest FBS coordinator.

=== Jacksonville State ===
When Rich Rodriguez was hired as the new head coach at Jacksonville State, after serving as the offensive coordinator at Louisiana-Monroe, he brought Alley with him as his defensive coordinator. In 2022, Jacksonville State had the #2 best overall defense in the FCS and top 25 in least points allowed per game, and concluded the season claiming the ASUN champion. The following season in the FBS, Jacksonville State finished 9-4, winning the school's first bowl game in school history. Jacksonville State's defense finished 15th in rushing defense, and 18th in least TDs allowed in the nation.

=== Oklahoma ===
In January 2024, the Oklahoma Sooners announced Zac Alley as defensive coordinator and linebackers coach. His first year he helped turn around Oklahoma's defense from the #99th total team defense in 2023 to a top 20-total defense in the country for 2024 season. Oklahoma's 2024 defense finished amongst the top in the country: 3rd in defensive touchdowns, 5th in fumbles recovered, 10th in team tackles for loss, 11th in first-down defense, 23rd in rushing defense, 25th in sacks and 30th in scoring defense.

=== West Virginia ===
On December 29, 2024, West Virginia announced Zac Alley as the new defensive coordinator and assistant head coach, reuniting him with head coach Rich Rodriguez.
