= Tavaris Barnes =

American football player (born 1991)

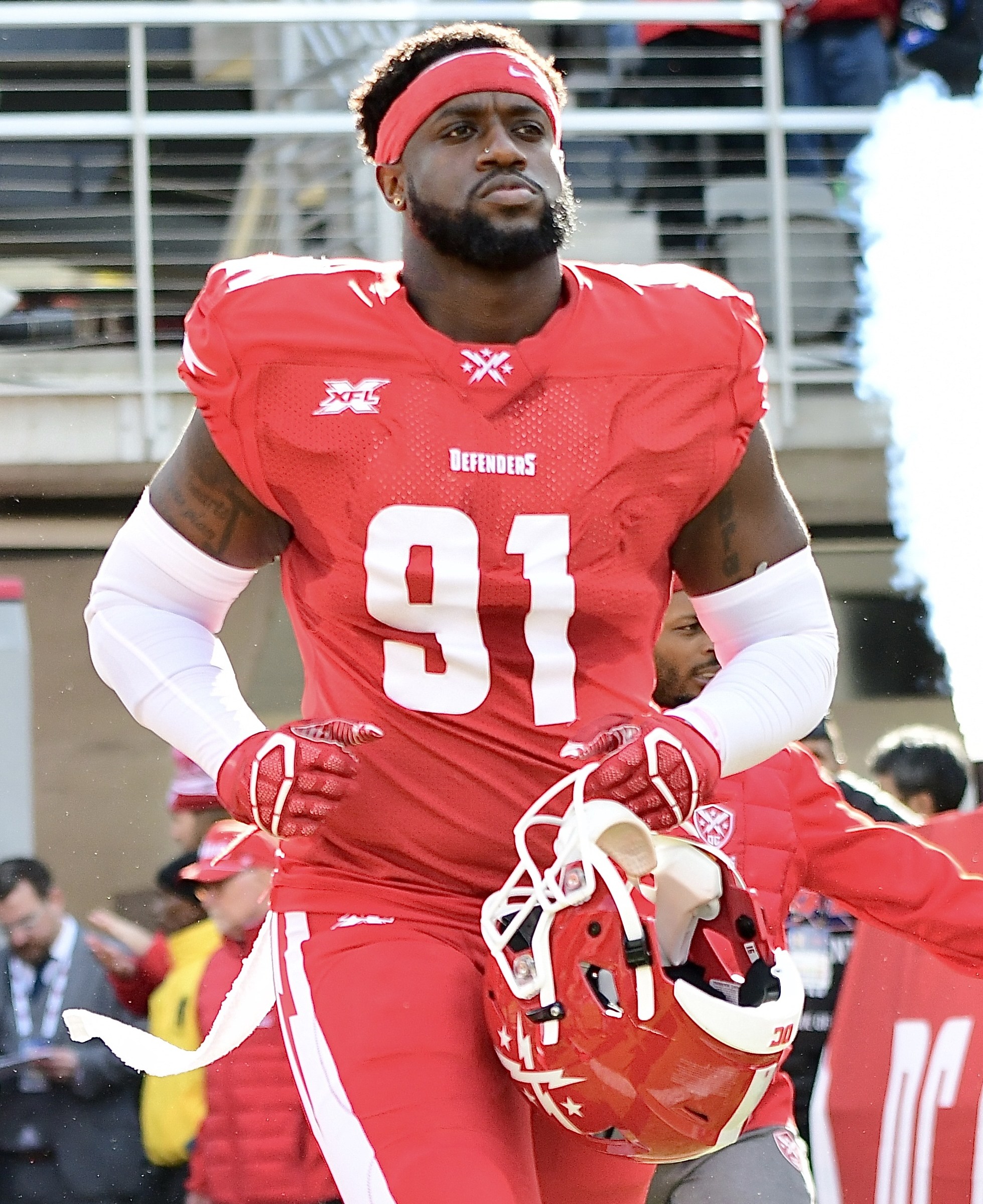
- Barnes with the DC Defenders in 2020

No. 90, 95, 79, 63, 94, 91
- Position: Defensive end

Personal information
- Born: November 2, 1991 (age 35); Jacksonville, Florida, U.S.
- Listed height: 6 ft 4 in (1.93 m)
- Listed weight: 267 lb (121 kg)

Career information
- High school: First Coast (Jacksonville)
- College: Clemson
- NFL draft: 2015: undrafted

Career history
- New Orleans Saints (2015); Seattle Seahawks (2016); Tampa Bay Buccaneers (2017)*; Washington Redskins (2017–2018)*; Atlanta Legends (2019); DC Defenders (2020); Calgary Stampeders (2021)*
- * Offseason or practice squad member only

Career NFL statistics
- Total tackles: 5
- Stats at Pro Football Reference

Tavaris Barnes Sr. (born November 2, 1991) is an American former professional football player who was a defensive end in the National Football League (NFL). He played college football for the Clemson Tigers, and signed with the New Orleans Saints as an undrafted free agent in 2015.

== Professional career ==
=== New Orleans Saints ===
On May 2, 2015, Barnes signed with the New Orleans Saints as an undrafted free agent. On September 5, Barnes made the New Orleans Saints 53-man roster. On April 25, 2016, he was waived.

=== Seattle Seahawks ===
On April 28, 2016, the Seattle Seahawks signed Barnes to their roster. On August 9, he was waived.

=== Tampa Bay Buccaneers ===
On May 31, 2017, Barnes was signed by the Tampa Bay Buccaneers. He was waived on September 2, 2017.

=== Washington Redskins ===
On November 8, 2017, Barnes was signed to the Washington Redskins' practice squad. He was released on November 14, 2017. He was re-signed on December 19, 2017. He signed a reserve/future contract with the Redskins on January 1, 2018, but was waived on August 7, 2018.

=== Atlanta Legends ===
In late 2018, Barnes joined the Atlanta Legends of the Alliance of American Football. The league ceased operations in April 2019.

=== DC Defenders ===
Barnes was selected by the DC Defenders in the open phase of the 2020 XFL draft. He had his contract terminated when the league suspended operations on April 10, 2020.

=== Calgary Stampeders ===
Barnes signed with the Calgary Stampeders of the CFL on January 27, 2021. He retired from football on June 28, 2021.

=== Statistics ===
Source: NFL.com

Year	Team	G	GS	Tackles					Interceptions						Fumbles	
Year	Team	G	GS	Total	Solo	Ast	Sck	SFTY	PDef	Int	Yds	Avg	Lng	TDs	FF	FR
Regular season
2015	NO	12	0	5	3	2	0.0	0	0	0	0	0.0	0	0	0	0
Total		12	0	5	3	2	0.0	0	0	0	0	0.0	0	0	0	0
