= Danny Pearman =

American football player and coach (born 1965)

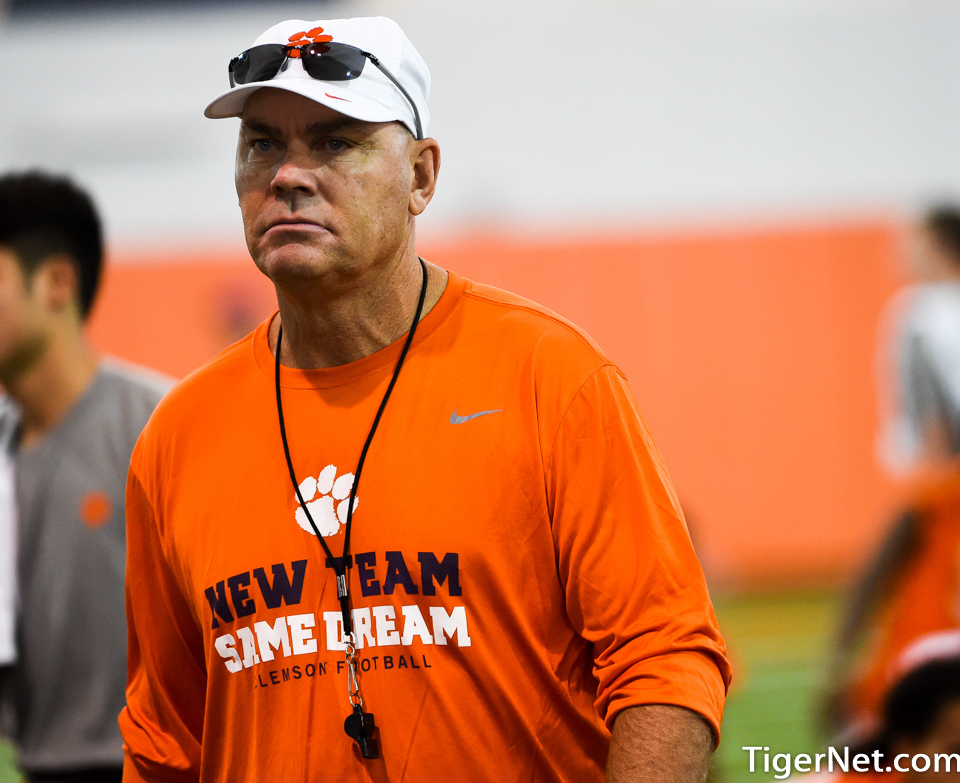

Current position
- Title: Director of scouting
- Team: Clemson
- Conference: ACC

Biographical details
- Born: February 17, 1965 (age 61); Charlotte, North Carolina, U.S.

Playing career
- 1985–1987: Clemson
- Position: Tight end

Coaching career (HC unless noted)
- 1988–1990: Clemson (GA)
- 1991–1997: Alabama (OT/DT/ST)
- 1998–2005: Virginia Tech (OT)
- 2006: North Carolina (DL)
- 2007: Duke (ST/TE)
- 2008: Maryland (ST/TE)
- 2009–2020: Clemson (ST/OT/TE)

Administrative career (AD unless noted)
- 2021–present: Clemson (dir. of scouting)

Accomplishments and honors

Championships
- National Championship (1992); 2x CFP national champion (2016, 2018)

Danny Pearman (born February 7, 1965) is an American college football assistant coach at Clemson University, serving as the director of scouting under head coach Dabo Swinney.

== Playing career ==
Pearman played college football at Clemson University under head coach Danny Ford. He would letter at tight end for the 1985-1987 seasons. During his playing years he would help Clemson to Atlantic Coast Conference Titles in 1986 and 1987.

== Coaching career ==
Pearman started his coaching career as a graduate assistant on the Tigers' 1988 ACC championship team. Since then, he has served on coaching staffs at Alabama, Virginia Tech, North Carolina, Duke, and Maryland before returning to Clemson in 2009 as special teams coordinator, as well as the offensive tackles and tight ends coach.

== Personal life ==
Pearman graduated with a bachelor's degree in finance from Clemson University in 1987 and completed his master of business administration from Clemson in 1989. He is married and has one daughter (Taylor) and two sons (Tanner, Trent) with his wife Kristy.
