= Corey Crawford (American football) =

American football player and coach (born 1991)

Clemson Tigers
- Title: Graduate assistant

Personal information
- Born: December 1, 1991 (age 34); Columbus, Georgia, U.S.
- Listed height: 6 ft 5 in (1.96 m)
- Listed weight: 298 lb (135 kg)

Career information
- High school: Hargrave Military Academy
- College: Clemson
- NFL draft: 2015: undrafted

Career history

Playing
- Washington Redskins (2015–2016)*; Columbus Lions (2017–2018); Memphis Express (2019); Carolina Cobras (2019); Houston Roughnecks (2020)
- * Offseason or practice squad member only

Coaching
- Clemson (2022-present) Graduate assistant
- Stats at Pro Football Reference

Corey Crawford (born December 1, 1991) is an American former football defensive end and current coach. He attended Clemson University, G.W. Carver HS Columbus, Georgia, and Hargrave Military Academy in Virginia.

== College career ==
Crawford committed to Clemson in 2011 as a four-star recruit and spent his entire collegiate career with the Tigers.

== Professional career ==
Pre-draft measurables
| Height | Weight | Arm length | Hand span | Wingspan | 40-yard dash | 10-yard split | 20-yard split | 20-yard shuttle | Three-cone drill | Vertical jump | Broad jump | Bench press |
|---|---|---|---|---|---|---|---|---|---|---|---|---|
| 6 ft 5 1/4 in (1.96 m) | 283 lb (128 kg) | 34 1/2 in (0.88 m) | 9 1/4 in (0.23 m) | 7 ft 1 in (2.16 m) | 5.01 s | 1.78 s | 2.91 s | 4.65 s | 7.64 s | 33.0 in (0.84 m) | 9 ft 2 in (2.79 m) | 17 reps |
All values from NFL Combine/Pro Day

Crawford was signed by the Redskins as an undrafted free agent on May 7, 2015. He was released on September 5, 2015, and signed to the practice squad the following day. He signed a futures contract with the Redskins on January 12, 2016, but was released on September 3, 2016. On June 8, 2017, Crawford signed with the Columbus Lions. In September 2017, Crawford re-signed with the Lions for 2018. He signed with the Carolina Cobras in 2019, but was placed on the team suspension list after signing with the Memphis Express of the Alliance of American Football on March 13, 2019. After the AAF suspended football operations, he was activated by the Cobras on April 3. He was placed on the refused to report list on April 6.

In October 2019, he was drafted by the Houston Roughnecks in the 2020 XFL draft. He had his contract terminated when the league suspended operations on April 10, 2020.

== Coaching career ==
Crawford began his coaching career in 2022, joining the staff at his alma mater, Clemson, as a defensive graduate assistant.
