= 2014 Georgia Tech Yellow Jackets football team =

American college football season

2014 Georgia Tech Yellow Jackets football

ACC Coastal Division champion Orange Bowl champion

ACC Championship, L 35–37 vs. Florida State

Orange Bowl, W 49–34 vs. Mississippi State
- Conference: Atlantic Coast Conference
- Coastal Division

Ranking
- Coaches: No. 7
- AP: No. 8
- Record: 11–3 (6–2 ACC)
- Head coach: Paul Johnson (7th season)
- Offensive scheme: Flexbone triple option
- Defensive coordinator: Ted Roof (5th season)
- Base defense: Multiple 4–3
- Home stadium: Bobby Dodd Stadium

2014 Atlantic Coast Conference football standings
	Conf.			Overall
Team	W		L	W		L
Atlantic Division
No. T–5 Florida State x$^	8	–	0	13	–	1
No. 15 Clemson	6	–	2	10	–	3
No. 24 Louisville	5	–	3	9	–	4
Boston College	4	–	4	7	–	6
NC State	3	–	5	8	–	5
Syracuse	1	–	7	3	–	9
Wake Forest	1	–	7	3	–	9
Coastal Division
No. 8 Georgia Tech x	6	–	2	11	–	3
Duke	5	–	3	9	–	4
North Carolina	4	–	4	6	–	7
Pittsburgh	4	–	4	6	–	7
Miami (FL)	3	–	5	6	–	7
Virginia Tech	3	–	5	7	–	6
Virginia	3	–	5	5	–	7
Championship: Florida State 37, Georgia Tech 35
^ – College Football Playoff participant; $ – Conference champion; x – Division champion/co-champions; Rankings from AP Poll

The 2014 Georgia Tech Yellow Jackets football team represented the Georgia Institute of Technology in the 2014 NCAA Division I FBS football season. The Yellow Jackets were led by seventh-year head coach Paul Johnson and played their home games at Bobby Dodd Stadium. They were a member of the Coastal Division of the Atlantic Coast Conference.

After going 7–6 in 2013, the Yellow Jackets entered 2014 unranked. Georgia Tech won its first five games of the season, which included comeback victories over Georgia Southern and Virginia Tech, and end a five-game losing streak to Miami (FL). After losing back-to-back games to Duke and North Carolina, the Yellow Jackets won out the rest of its regular season, which was capped off with a 30–24 overtime victory over Georgia. The Yellow Jackets represented the Coastal Division in the ACC Championship Game, where they were defeated by Atlantic Division champions Florida State 37-35, however the Yellow Jackets were invited to the Orange Bowl, where they defeated Mississippi State 49–34. Georgia Tech ended the season with an 11–3 record and a #8 ranking in the final AP Poll.

== Before the season ==
=== Previous season ===
The Yellow Jackets were members of the Coastal Division of the Atlantic Coast Conference, finishing the season 7–5 (5–3 in ACC play). They were invited to the Music City Bowl where they were defeated by Ole Miss. Three players from the 2013 team were taken in the 2014 NFL draft.

=== Preseason ===
Head coach Paul Johnson returned for his seventh year at the helm of the program. Vad Lee, who was Georgia Tech's starter in 2013, was replaced by Justin Thomas after Lee transferred to James Madison. The Yellow Jackets were picked to finish fifth in the Coastal Division in the ACC preseason media poll.

=== Recruiting class ===
College recruiting (2014)
Name	Hometown	School	Height	Weight	40^{‡}	Commit date
Lance Austin; DB	Griffin, GA	Lamar County	5 ft 9 in (1.75 m)	179 lb (81 kg)	4.6	Jun 17, 2013
Lance Austin; DB	Recruit ratings: Scout: Rivals: 247Sports: ESPN:					
Lawrence Austin; DB	Griffin, GA	Lamar County	5 ft 9 in (1.75 m)	181 lb (82 kg)	4.6	Jun 17, 2013
Lawrence Austin; DB	Recruit ratings: Scout: Rivals: 247Sports: ESPN:					
Myles Autry; ATH	Norcross, GA	Norcross	5 ft 11 in (1.80 m)	175 lb (79 kg)	*	Feb 2, 2014
Myles Autry; ATH	Recruit ratings: Scout: Rivals: 247Sports: ESPN:					
Gary Brown; OL	Tampa, FL	Alonso	6 ft 1 in (1.85 m)	290 lb (130 kg)	5.1	Sep 23, 2013
Gary Brown; OL	Recruit ratings: Scout: Rivals: 247Sports: ESPN:					
Stepheny Durham; DB	Jacksonville, FL	Atlantic Coast	5 ft 11 in (1.80 m)	185 lb (84 kg)	4.7	Jun 8, 2013
Stepheny Durham; DB	Recruit ratings: Scout: Rivals: 247Sports: ESPN:					
KeShun Freeman; OLB/DE	Hogansville, GA	Callaway	6 ft 1 in (1.85 m)	223 lb (101 kg)	4.6	Jun 7, 2013
KeShun Freeman; OLB/DE	Recruit ratings: Scout: Rivals: 247Sports: ESPN:					
Tre Jackson; LB	Valdosta, GA	Lowndes	5 ft 10 in (1.78 m)	225 lb (102 kg)	5.0	Mar 15, 2013
Tre Jackson; LB	Recruit ratings: Scout: Rivals: 247Sports: ESPN:					
Jalen Johnson; ATH	Oneonta, AL	Oneonta	6 ft 2 in (1.88 m)	196 lb (89 kg)	4.5	May 30, 2013
Jalen Johnson; ATH	Recruit ratings: Scout: Rivals: 247Sports: ESPN:					
Matthew Jordan; QB	Jackson, AL	Jackson	6 ft 1 in (1.85 m)	290 lb (130 kg)	5.1	Jun 29, 2013
Matthew Jordan; QB	Recruit ratings: Scout: Rivals: 247Sports: ESPN:					
Shaun Kagawa; DB	Hilo, HI	Kamehameha School	5 ft 11 in (1.80 m)	184 lb (83 kg)	*	May 29, 2013
Shaun Kagawa; DB	Recruit ratings: Scout: Rivals:					
Trey Klock; TE	Hummelstown, PA	Lower Dauphin	6 ft 4 in (1.93 m)	264 lb (120 kg)	4.9	Jun 16, 2013
Trey Klock; TE	Recruit ratings: Scout: Rivals: 247Sports: ESPN:					
C.J. Leggett; RB	Suwanee, GA	North Gwinnett	5 ft 10 in (1.78 m)	210 lb (95 kg)	4.5	Dec 20, 2013
C.J. Leggett; RB	Recruit ratings: Scout: Rivals: 247Sports: ESPN:					
Terrell Lewis; LB	Ocoee, FL	Ocoee	6 ft 2 in (1.88 m)	217 lb (98 kg)	4.6	Aug 3, 2013
Terrell Lewis; LB	Recruit ratings: Scout: Rivals: 247Sports: ESPN:					
Clinton Lynch; WR	Norcross, GA	Norcross	6 ft 0 in (1.83 m)	185 lb (84 kg)	4.5	Feb 4, 2013
Clinton Lynch; WR	Recruit ratings: Scout: Rivals: 247Sports:					
Andrew Marshall; OL	Cumming, GA	West Forsyth	6 ft 4 in (1.93 m)	267 lb (121 kg)	*	Sep 5, 2013
Andrew Marshall; OL	Recruit ratings: Scout: Rivals: 247Sports: ESPN:					
Tyler Merriweather; DE	Demopolis, AL	Demopolis	6 ft 3 in (1.91 m)	230 lb (100 kg)	4.8	Jun 8, 2013
Tyler Merriweather; DE	Recruit ratings: Scout: Rivals: 247Sports: ESPN:					
Michael Preddy; DE	Charleston, SC	Porter-Gaud School	6 ft 5 in (1.96 m)	240 lb (110 kg)	4.8	Jul 12, 2013
Michael Preddy; DE	Recruit ratings: Scout: Rivals: 247Sports: ESPN:					
Qua Searcy; DB	Barnesville, GA	Lamar County	5 ft 11 in (1.80 m)	170 lb (77 kg)	4.5	Jun 19, 2013
Qua Searcy; DB	Recruit ratings: Scout: Rivals: 247Sports: ESPN:					
Antonio Simmons; DE	Jacksonville, FL	University Christian School	6 ft 4 in (1.93 m)	210 lb (95 kg)	4.6	Nov 3, 2013
Antonio Simmons; DE	Recruit ratings: Scout: Rivals: 247Sports: ESPN:					
Jake Stickler; OL	Bradenton, FL	Manatee	6 ft 5 in (1.96 m)	281 lb (127 kg)	5.3	Jul 26, 2013
Jake Stickler; OL	Recruit ratings: Scout: Rivals: 247Sports: ESPN:					
Kenderius Whitehead; DE	Milledgeville, GA	Georgia Military College	6 ft 5 in (1.96 m)	225 lb (102 kg)	*	Feb 2, 2014
Kenderius Whitehead; DE	Recruit ratings: Scout: Rivals: 247Sports:					
Jake Whitley; OL	North Augusta, SC	North Augusta	6 ft 4 in (1.93 m)	295 lb (134 kg)	5.2	Sep 4, 2013
Jake Whitley; OL	Recruit ratings: Scout: Rivals: 247Sports: ESPN:					
Overall recruit ranking: Scout: 47 Rivals: 47 247Sports: 56 ESPN: 54
‡ Refers to 40-yard dash; Note: In many cases, Scout, Rivals, 247Sports, On3, and ESPN may conflict in their listings of height, weight and 40 time.; In these cases, the average was taken. ESPN grades are on a 100-point scale.; Sources: "Georgia Tech 2014 Football Commitments". Rivals.; "2014 Georgia Tech Commits". Scout.; "2014 Player Commitments – Georgia Tech". ESPN.; "Scout.com Team Recruiting Rankings". Scout.; "2014 Team Ranking". Rivals.com.

=== Spring game ===
Georgia Tech's spring game was held on April 14 at Bobby Dodd Stadium. In a rain-soaked game, the White team, led by quarterback Tim Byerly, defeated the Gold team 20–12.

== Coaching staff ==
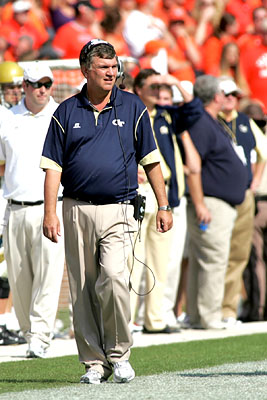
Head Coach Paul Johnson

Name	Position	Seasons at Georgia Tech	Alma mater
Paul Johnson	Head Coach	7	Western Carolina (1979)
Bryan Cook	Quarterbacks/B-Backs	2	Ithaca (1998)
Lamar S. Owens Jr.	A-Backs	7	Maryland (2008)
Al Preston	Wide Receivers	7	Hawaii (1982)
Mike Sewak	Offensive line	7	Virginia (1981)
Ted Roof	Defensive coordinator	2	Georgia Tech (1986)
Andy McCollum	Linebackers/Recruiting coordinator	5	Austin Peay State (1981)
Mike Pelton	Defensive line	2	Auburn (1999)
Joe Speed	Defensive Backs	5	Navy (1996)
Ray Rychleski	Special Teams coordinator	1	Penn State (1979)

== Schedule ==
Date	Time	Opponent	Rank	Site	TV	Result	Attendance
August 30	12:30 pm	Wofford*		Bobby Dodd Stadium; Atlanta, GA	ACCRSN	W 38–19	45,403
September 6	4:00 pm	at Tulane*		Yulman Stadium; New Orleans, LA	ESPNews	W 38–21	30,000
September 13	12:00 pm	Georgia Southern*		Bobby Dodd Stadium; Atlanta, GA	RSN	W 42–38	53,173
September 20	12:00 pm	at Virginia Tech		Lane Stadium; Blacksburg, VA (Battle of the Techs)	ESPN	W 27–24	62,318
October 4	7:30 pm	Miami (FL)		Bobby Dodd Stadium; Atlanta, GA	ESPN2	W 28–17	52,221
October 11	12:30 pm	Duke	No. 22	Bobby Dodd Stadium; Atlanta, GA	ACCN	L 25–31	44,281
October 18	7:00 pm	at North Carolina		Kenan Memorial Stadium; Chapel Hill, NC	ESPNU	L 43–48	53,000
October 25	3:30 pm	at Pittsburgh		Heinz Field; Pittsburgh, PA	ESPNU	W 56–28	44,734
November 1	3:30 pm	Virginia^{†}		Bobby Dodd Stadium; Atlanta, GA	ESPNU	W 35–10	46,657
November 8	12:30 pm	at NC State	No. 24	Carter–Finley Stadium; Raleigh, NC	ACCN	W 56–23	54,653
November 15	12:00 pm	No. 19 Clemson	No. 22	Bobby Dodd Stadium; Atlanta, GA (rivalry)	ESPN	W 28–6	49,378
November 29	12:00 pm	at No. 9 Georgia*	No. 16	Sanford Stadium; Athens, GA (Clean, Old-Fashioned Hate)	SECN	W 30–24 ^{OT}	92,746
December 6	8:00 pm	vs. No. 4 Florida State	No. 11	Bank of America Stadium; Charlotte, NC (ACC Championship Game)	ABC	L 35–37	64,808
December 31	8:00 pm	vs. No. 7 Mississippi State*	No. 12	Sun Life Stadium; Miami Gardens, FL (Orange Bowl)	ESPN	W 49–34	58,211
*Non-conference game; ^{†}Homecoming; Rankings from AP Poll (1–8) and CFP Poll (9–15) released prior to game; All times are in Eastern time

- Schedule source:

== Game summaries ==
=== Wofford ===
	1	2	3	4	Total
Terriers	3	6	3	7	19
Yellow Jackets	7	3	14	14	38

Near the end of the first half, Wofford took a 9–7 lead on a 92-yard touchdown run from Ray Smith. However, the Yellow Jackets were able to take a 10–9 lead into halftime with a 30-yard field goal from Harrison Butker. The Yellow Jackets expanded their lead in the third quarter 24–12 thanks to two touchdowns to wide receiver DeAndre Smelter. The Terriers closed gap 24–19 in the middle of the fourth quarter thanks to a 4-yard touchdown run from Octavius Harden, but the Yellow Jackets were able to score two more touchdowns towards the end of the game to win the matchup 38–19. In his first start as Georgia Tech's quarterback, Justin Thomas had 353 total yards of offense, including 282 passing yards.

=== Tulane ===
	1	2	3	4	Total
Yellow Jackets	7	17	7	7	38
Green Wave	14	7	0	0	21

In the first game at Yulman Stadium, Georgia Tech defeated Tulane, 38–21. Tulane took a 14–7 lead going into the second quarter. Georgia Tech tied the game, 14–14, on a 10-yard interception return from linebacker Quayshawn Nealy. Tulane took a 21–14 lead with 9:38 left in the half on a 61-yard touchdown pass from Tanner Lee to Xavier Rush. An interception of Tanner Lee helped set up a 19-yard touchdown run from Tony Zenon to tie the game, 21–21. A 46-yard field goal from Harrison Butker gave Georgia Tech a 24–21 lead at halftime. Tulane was shut out in the second half, as Georgia Tech scored two more touchdowns to give the Yellow Jackets a 38–21 victory.

=== Georgia Southern ===
	1	2	3	4	Total
Eagles	7	3	20	8	38
Yellow Jackets	14	21	0	7	42

Georgia Tech dominated the first half, going into half with a 35–10 lead. However, Georgia Southern scored 28 unanswered points to give the Eagles a 38–35 lead in the middle of the fourth quarter. Recovering a Georgia Southern fumble with 4:12 remaining in the game, Georgia Tech were able to take a 42–38 lead with 23 seconds remaining on a 13-yard touchdown pass from Justin Thomas to Deon Hill to avoid a huge upset.

=== Virginia Tech ===
	1	2	3	4	Total
Yellow Jackets	3	7	0	17	27
Hokies	3	13	0	8	24

Virginia Tech led 13–3 in the middle of the second quarter. However, Georgia Tech was able to make it a 13–10 game on a 2-yard touchdown run from Justin Thomas. Georgia Tech took a 17–16 lead in the fourth quarter on a 41-yard interception return by Paul Davis. The Hokies then took a 24–17 when quarterback Michael Brewer recovered a fumble and ran 21 yards for a touchdown. Georgia Tech tied the game 24–24 on a nine-play, 67-yard drive that included a 4th-and-15 conversion and a 31-yard touchdown pass to DeAndre Smelter. Michael Brewer was intercepted on the ensuing Hokies drive. Taking advantage of the interception, Georgia Tech won the game 27–24 on a 24-yard field goal from Harrison Butker as time expired. The game not only marked Georgia Tech's first victory over Virginia Tech since 2009, but also at Blacksburg since 2006.

=== Miami ===
	1	2	3	4	Total
Hurricanes	14	0	3	0	17
Yellow Jackets	7	7	7	7	28

The Hurricanes scored first on a 21-yard touchdown pass from Brad Kaaya to Braxton Berrios. Georgia Tech tied the game 7–7 on a 1-yard touchdown run from Justin Thomas. At the end of the first quarter, Miami took a 14–7 lead on a 24-yard touchdown run from Duke Johnson. The Yellow Jackets would control the rest of the game, as Georgia Tech outscored Miami 21–3 to give the Yellow Jackets a 28–17 victory. The game marked Georgia Tech's first victory over Miami since 2008.

=== Duke ===
	1	2	3	4	Total
Blue Devils	7	7	10	7	31
#22 Yellow Jackets	3	9	0	13	25

Georgia Tech entered the game ranked in the AP Poll for the first time since week 13 of the 2011 season. Duke took a 31–12 lead in the middle of the fourth quarter on a 1-yard touchdown run from Thomas Sirk. Georgia Tech was able to close the gap 31–25 thanks to two Tim Byerly rushing touchdowns. However, Georgia Tech was unable to recover their onside kick with 1:27 remaining in the game, giving the Blue Devils the victory. Georgia Tech turned the ball over three times and quarterback Justin Thomas was benched in favor of Tim Byerly the fourth quarter after Thomas threw his second interception. The game not only marked Georgia Tech's first loss to Duke since 2003, but also at home since 1994.

=== North Carolina ===
	1	2	3	4	Total
Yellow Jackets	7	10	7	19	43
Tar Heels	7	14	14	13	48

Georgia Tech trailed 42–31 in the fourth quarter after a 36-yard touchdown pass from Marquise Williams to Mack Hollins. The Yellow Jackets then scored two unanswered touchdowns, the latter being a 75-yard touchdown run off a reverse from wide receiver DeAndre Smelter, to give Georgia Tech a 43–42 lead with 3:07 remaining in the game. However, North Carolina scored on a 2-yard touchdown run from T. J. Logan with 11 seconds remaining to give the Tar Heels a 48–43 victory. The game marked Georgia Tech's first loss to UNC since 2008.

=== Pittsburgh ===
	1	2	3	4	Total
Yellow Jackets	28	0	7	21	56
Panthers	0	14	7	7	28

Taking advantage of four Pittsburgh turnovers, Georgia Tech took a 28–0 lead early in the game. Pittsburgh closed the gap 28–14 in the second quarter with two rushing touchdown from James Conner. After trading touchdowns the third quarter, Georgia Tech pulled away from the Panthers with three more rushing touchdowns to give Georgia Tech a 56–28 victory.

=== Virginia ===
	1	2	3	4	Total
Cavaliers	7	3	0	0	10
Yellow Jackets	14	7	7	7	35

At Georgia Tech's Homecoming game, the Yellow Jackets defeated the Cavaliers 35–10. Quarterback Justin Thomas threw three touchdowns and running back Synjyn Days ran for 147 yards while the Georgia Tech defense held Virginia to only 22 rushing yards.

=== North Carolina State ===
	1	2	3	4	Total
#24 Yellow Jackets	14	21	14	7	56
Wolfpack	13	3	0	7	23

Georgia Tech trailed 13–7 near the end of the first quarter, but the Yellow Jackets outscored the Wolfpack 49–10 the rest of the game to win 56–23. Georgia Tech's offense rushed for 479 yards while the defense scored two defensive touchdowns.

=== Clemson ===
	1	2	3	4	Total
#19 Tigers	3	0	3	0	6
#22 Yellow Jackets	6	3	16	3	28

Georgia Tech took a 6–3 lead in the first quarter on an 85-yard interception return from Jamal Golden. In the third quarter, Chris Milton returned an interception 62 yards for a touchdown to give Georgia Tech a 25–6 lead. Georgia Tech won the game 28–6. Georgia Tech's defense limited Clemson's offense to only 190 yards.

In the following bye week, Georgia Tech clinched the ACC Coastal Division title when North Carolina defeated Duke 45–20.

=== Georgia ===
#16 Georgia Tech Yellow Jackets (9–2) at #10 Georgia Bulldogs (9–2)

Quarter	1	2	3	4	OT	Total
Georgia Tech	0	7	7	10	6	30
Georgia	7	0	7	10	0	24

at Sanford Stadium • Athens, Georgia

- Date: November 29
- Game time: 12:00 p.m. EDT
- Game weather: Sunny • 49 °F (9 °C) • Wind 3 miles per hour (4.8 km/h; 2.6 kn)
- Game attendance: 92,746
- Referee: Matt Moore
- TV: SEC Network
- Box Score

Game information

Georgia Tech

- Justin Thomas
  6/16, 64 Yds, TD
- Zach Laskey
  26 Rush, 140 Yds, 3 TD
- DeAndre Smelter
  3 Rec, 44 Yds

Georgia

- Hutson Mason
  18/28, 194 Yds, TD, INT
- Nick Chubb
  25 Rush, 129 Yds, TD
- Malcolm Mitchell
  7 Rec, 56 Yds, TD

Georgia took a 7–0 lead early in the first quarter on a 1-yard touchdown run from Nick Chubb. Towards the end of the first quarter, Georgia drove deep into Georgia Tech's territory, hoping to expand their lead. However, Nick Chubb lost a fumble at Georgia Tech's 1-yard line.

Taking advantage of Chubb's fumble, Georgia Tech drove to Georgia's 20-yard line. However, Georgia Tech came up empty when Harrison Butker's kick was blocked. On the ensuing Georgia drive, UGA drove once again drove deep Georgia Tech territory. However, Georgia once again lost a fumble at Georgia Tech's 1-yard line, this time a fumble by Sony Michel. Taking advantage of the fumble, Georgia Tech was able to tie the game 7–7 near the end of the second quarter on a 7-yard touchdown pass from Justin Thomas to Darren Waller. In the third quarter, Georgia took a 14–7 lead after UGA's Damian Swann returned a Justin Thomas fumble 99-yards for a touchdown. After blocking a Georgia field goal, Georgia Tech tied the game 14–14 on a 4-yard touchdown run from Zach Laskey.

Early in the fourth quarter, Georgia took a 17–14 lead on a 19-yard field goal from Marshall Morgan. Georgia Tech responded with an 8-yard touchdown run from Zach Laskey to give the Yellow Jackets a 21–17 lead. Georgia Tech was then able to recover their own kickoff at Georgia's 27-yard line. However, Justin Thomas fumbled with 2:41 remaining in the game. Taking advantage of the fumble, UGA took a 24–21 lead with 18 seconds remaining on a 3-yard passing touchdown from Hutson Mason to Malcolm Mitchell. A squib kickoff gave Georgia Tech good field possession. After Justin Thomas scrambled 21 yards, Harrison Butker kicked a 53-yard field goal to tie the game 24–24 and send the game into overtime.

Georgia Tech received the ball first in overtime and took a 30–24 lead on a 2-yard touchdown run from Zach Laskey. However, the extra point was blocked and the game remained 30–24. On the ensuing UGA possession, Georgia was able to drive to Georgia Tech's 9-yard line, needing a touchdown and extra point to win. However, on a 2nd and goal play, Georgia Tech cornerback D.J. White intercepted a Hutson Mason pass intended for Malcolm Mitchell, sealing a victory for Georgia Tech. The game was Georgia Tech's first win over Georgia since 2008.

Scoring summary

Quarter	Time	Drive			Team	Scoring information	Score	
Quarter	Time	Plays	Yards	TOP	Team	Scoring information	GT	UGA
1	10:57	10	75	4:03	Georgia	Nick Chubb 1-yard touchdown run, Marshall Morgan kick good	0	7
2	0:08	14	80	2:56	Georgia Tech	Darren Waller 7-yard touchdown reception from Justin Thomas, Harrison Butker kick good	7	7
3	8:42				Georgia	Fumble recovery returned 99 yards for touchdown by Damian Swann, Marshall Morgan kick good	7	14
3	2:13	8	63	3:52	Georgia Tech	Zach Laskey 4-yard touchdown run, Harrison Butker kick good	14	14
4	11:19	15	73	5:54	Georgia	19-yard field goal by Marshall Morgan	14	17
4	4:22	13	80	6:51	Georgia Tech	Zach Laskey 8-yard touchdown run, Harrison Butker kick good	21	17
4	0:18	12	69	2:23	Georgia	Malcolm Mitchell 3-yard touchdown reception from Hutson Mason, Marshall Morgan kick good	21	24
4	0:00	2	21	0:13	Georgia Tech	53-yard field goal by Harrison Butker	24	24
OT		5	25		Georgia Tech	Zach Laskey 2-yard touchdown run, Harrison Butker kick no good (blocked)	30	24
"TOP" = time of possession. For other American football terms, see Glossary of American football.							30	24

=== Florida State (ACC Championship Game) ===
	1	2	3	4	Total
#4 Seminoles	7	21	3	6	37
#11 Yellow Jackets	14	7	7	7	35

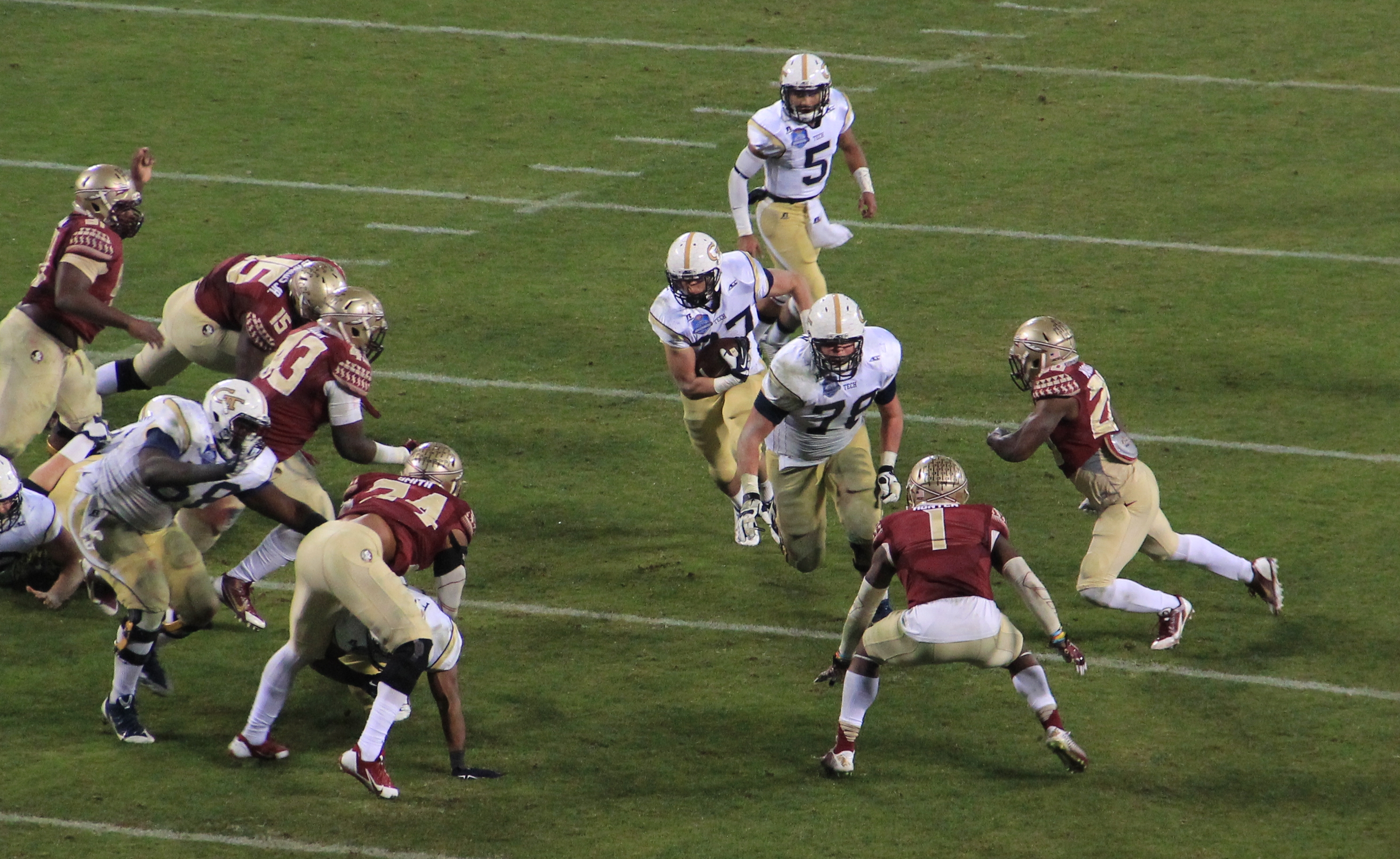
Georgia Tech's Zach Laskey rushing at the 2014 ACC Championship Game.

In the ACC Championship Game, Georgia Tech took on Florida State, the defending national champions. Georgia Tech's offense scored on their first three possessions to give Georgia Tech a 21–14 lead in the middle of the second quarter. However, FSU scored two unanswered touchdowns to give FSU a 28–21 lead into halftime.

Georgia Tech was able to tie the game 28–28 on the opening drive in the third quarter. However, Florida State scored three field goals from Roberto Aguayo as the Seminoles were able to limit Georgia Tech's offense and pull ahead 37–28. Georgia Tech was able to cut Florida States' lead to two on a 25-yard touchdown pass from Justin Thomas to Darren Waller to make it a 37–35 game with 1:47 remaining. However, Georgia Tech was unable to recover their onside kick and Florida State was able to run out the clock, giving FSU the ACC Championship.

=== Mississippi State (Orange Bowl) ===
	1	2	3	4	Total
#7 Bulldogs	0	20	0	14	34
#12 Yellow Jackets	14	7	21	7	49

Appearing in its seventh Orange Bowl, Georgia Tech defeated Mississippi State 49–34. The Yellow Jackets went up 14–0 before Mississippi State scored 13 straight points to make it a 14–13 game. Georgia Tech was able to extend its lead 21–13 on a 13-yard touchdown run from Justin Thomas. On the final play of the first half, Mississippi State's Dak Prescott completed a 42-yard Hail Mary pass to make it a 21–20 lead going into halftime. On the second play of the second half, Georgia Tech went up 28–20 on a 69-yard touchdown run from Synjyn Days. Two more rushing touchdowns from Justin Thomas helped expand Georgia Tech's lead 42–20. In the first play of the fourth quarter, Mississippi State cut into Georgia Tech's lead on a 7-yard touchdown pass from Dak Prescott to De'Runnya Wilson to make it a 42–27 game. Georgia Tech was able to respond with a 4-yard touchdown run from Synjyn Days to give Georgia Tech a 49–27 lead. The Bulldogs were able to cut into Georgia Tech's lead with a 12-yard touchdown pass from Dak Prescott to De'Runnya Wilson with 2:20 remaining in the game to make it a 49–34 game. However, the Bulldogs were unable to recover their onside kick, and Georgia Tech was able to seal the win after running out the clock.

Georgia Tech rushed for 452 yards and Justin Thomas, the game's MVP, accounted for four total touchdowns. The game also marked Georgia Tech's first Orange Bowl victory in 63 years.

== Rankings ==
Ranking movements Legend: ██ Increase in ranking ██ Decrease in ranking — = Not ranked RV = Received votes
	Week																
Poll	Pre	1	2	3	4	5	6	7	8	9	10	11	12	13	14	15	Final
AP	—	—	—	—	RV	RV	22	RV	—	—	RV	24	17	16	12	10	8
Coaches	RV	—	—	—	RV	RV	23	RV	—	RV	RV	23	16	15	12	9	7
CFP	Not released									—	24	22	18	16	11	12	Not released

== Awards ==
=== Conference awards ===
- ACC Coach of the Year

Paul Johnson

=== Honors ===
==== All-ACC ====
Nine players were honored as All-ACC selections by coaches

- Second team

DeAndre Smelter
Shaq Mason

Justin Thomas
Adam Gotsis
Zach Laskey

- Third team

Quayshawn Nealy
Jamal Golden

- Honorable mention

Synjyn Days
KeShun Freeman (who was also selected as a Freshman All-American)

=== NFL draft ===
The following Georgia Tech players were selected in the 2015 NFL draft:

Round	Pick	Overall	Name	Position	Team
4th	32	131	Shaq Mason	Offensive Guard	New England Patriots
4th	33	132	DeAndre Smelter	Wide receiver	San Francisco 49ers
6th	28	204	Darren Waller	Wide receiver	Baltimore Ravens
