= Zach Laskey =

American football player (born 1992)

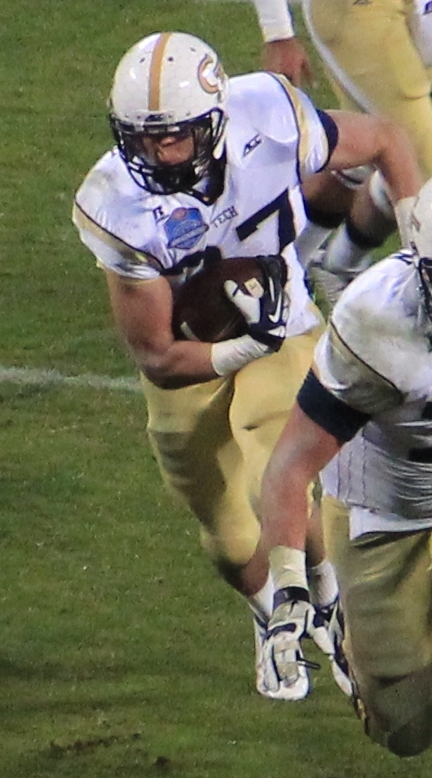
- Laskey in 2014

No. 45
- Position: Fullback

Personal information
- Born: July 8, 1992 (age 34); Pittsburgh, Pennsylvania, U.S.
- Listed height: 6 ft 2 in (1.88 m)
- Listed weight: 238 lb (108 kg)

Career information
- High school: Starr's Mill (Fayetteville, Georgia)
- College: Georgia Tech (2011–2014)
- NFL draft: 2015: undrafted

Career history
- St. Louis / Los Angeles Rams (2015–2017)
- Stats at Pro Football Reference

Zach Laskey (born July 8, 1992) is an American former football fullback. He played college football at Georgia Tech.

== Professional career ==
Coming out of Georgia Tech, Laskey was ranked a top 10 fullback prospect, but was unfortunately not one of three fullbacks to receive an invitation to attend the NFL Scouting Combine in Indianapolis, Indiana. On March 13, 2015, Laskey attended Georgia Tech's pro day, along with Shaq Mason, Darren Waller, DeAndre Smelter, and three other prospects. He performed all of the combine and positional drills for team representatives and scouts from 31 NFL teams. At the conclusion of the pre-draft process, Laskey was projected to be a seventh round pick or be signed as an undrafted free agent. He was ranked the eighth best fullback prospect in the draft by NFLDraftScout.com.

Pre-draft measurables
| Height | Weight | 40-yard dash | 10-yard split | 20-yard split | 20-yard shuttle | Three-cone drill | Vertical jump | Broad jump | Bench press |
|---|---|---|---|---|---|---|---|---|---|
| 6 ft 2 in (1.88 m) | 225 lb (102 kg) | 4.59 s | 1.59 s | 2.63 s | 4.17 s | 6.94 s | 35 in (0.89 m) | 10 ft 4 in (3.15 m) | 19 reps |
All values from Georgia Tech's Pro Day

On May 2, 2015, the St. Louis Rams signed Laskey to a three-year, $1.57 million contract as an undrafted free agent after he went unselected in the 2015 NFL draft. The contract also includes a signing bonus of $3,000. During the draft, the Tennessee Titans called Laskey and stated they weren't going to be able to draft him, but were looking to sign him immediately after the draft was complete. The Los Angeles Rams called immediately after and Laskey chose to sign with the Rams after speaking with their running backs coach Ben Sirmans. Laskey was the first true fullback the Rams have had since Mike Karney in 2010. Throughout training camp, he competed for a roster spot with tight ends Lance Kendricks and Cory Harkey.

He was released by the Rams on September 5, 2015, and was signed to the practice squad the next day.

On August 30, 2016, Laskey was waived/injured by the Rams and placed on injured reserve.

On August 4, 2017, Laskey was again waived/injured by the Rams and placed on injured reserve.
