= 2014 Quick Lane Bowl =

- 1st Quick Lane Bowl
Rutgers Scarlet Knights	North Carolina Tar Heels
(7–5)	(6–6)
Big Ten	ACC
40	21
Head coach: Kyle Flood	Head coach: Larry Fedora
	1	2	3	4	Total
Rutgers	7	16	7	10	40
North Carolina	0	0	7	14	21
- Date: December 26, 2014
- Season: 2014
- Stadium: Ford Field
- Location: Detroit, Michigan
- MVP: Rutgers RB Josh Hicks
- Favorite: North Carolina by 3.5
- National anthem: Jena Irene
- Referee: Marc Curles (SEC)
- Attendance: 23,876

United States TV coverage
- Network: ESPN; CBS Sports Radio
- Announcers: Mark Neely, Ray Bentley, & Niki Noto (ESPN); Doug Karsch & Jon Jansen (Quick Lane Radio)

The 2014 Quick Lane Bowl was a post-season college football bowl game between the Rutgers Scarlet Knights and the North Carolina Tar Heels played on December 26, 2014, at Ford Field in Detroit, Michigan. It was the first edition of the Quick Lane Bowl, replacing the Little Caesars Pizza Bowl, and the final game of the 2014 NCAA Division I FBS football season for both teams. For 2014 bowl season the Quick Lane Bowl had contractual tie-ins with the Big Ten Conference and the Atlantic Coast Conference. With the discontinuance of the Little Caesars Bowl, successor to the Motor City Bowl, it was the first time since 1997 that a Mid-American Conference team did not play a post-season game in Detroit. The game was sponsored by Ford Motor Company through its service-center brand Quick Lane.

== Team selection ==
This was the seventh overall meeting between these two teams, with the series tied 3–3 coming into the game. The previous time these two teams met was in 2011.

=== Rutgers Scarlet Knights ===
The Rutgers Scarlet Knights posted a 7–5 record (3–5 conference) in their first year competing in the Big Ten after moving over from the American Athletic Conference. As the regular season came to a close Rutgers officials entered into negotiations with several bowls, hoping to secure a post-season berth. Although apparently preferring the TaxSlayer and Music City Bowl, both of which had obligations to accept Big Ten teams, Rutgers accepted when Tom Lewand, president of the Detroit Lions and CEO of the Quick Lane bowl, extended an invitation on December 7, 2014. With the acceptance head coach Kyle Flood became the first in Rutgers history to reach a bowl game in his first three seasons.

=== North Carolina Tar Heels ===
The North Carolina Tar Heels finished the regular season 6–6 (4–4 conference) under third-year head coach Larry Fedora. This is the first time North Carolina will play a bowl game in the state of Michigan. Other possible destinations for UNC were the Independence Bowl, Military Bowl, and the St. Petersburg Bowl.

== Game summary ==
=== Scoring summary ===
Scoring summary

Quarter	Time	Drive			Team	Scoring information	Score	
Quarter	Time	Plays	Yards	TOP	Team	Scoring information	RUTG	UNC
1	12:43	5	75	2:17	RUTG	Andre Patton 34-yard touchdown reception from Gary Nova, Kyle Federico kick good	7	0
2	13:37	7	91	3:42	RUTG	Josh Hicks 21-yard touchdown run, Kyle Federico kick good	14	0
2	9:08	5	49	2:26	RUTG	Robert Martin 8-yard touchdown run, Kyle Federico kick no good	20	0
2	0:11	10	58	4:44	RUTG	19-yard field goal by Kyle Federico	23	0
3	10:39	12	76	4:21	UNC	Marquise Williams 1-yard touchdown run, Thomas Moore kick good	23	7
3	7:33	7	75	3:06	RUTG	Andrew Turzilli 34-yard touchdown reception from Gary Nova, Kyle Federico kick good	30	7
4	14:11	6	56	3:09	RUTG	Robert Martin 28-yard touchdown run, Kyle Federico kick good	37	7
4	10:04	6	44	2:13	RUTG	31-yard field goal by Kyle Federico	40	7
4	6:45	8	71	3:19	UNC	Jack Tabb 7-yard touchdown reception from Marquise Williams, Thomas Moore kick good	40	14
4	4:59	6	54	1:46	UNC	Kendrick Singleton 1-yard touchdown reception from Mitchell Trubisky, Thomas Moore kick good	40	21
"TOP" = time of possession. For other American football terms, see Glossary of American football.							40	21

=== Statistics ===
Statistics	RUTG	UNC
First downs	23	27
Plays–yards	62–524	86–482
Rushes–yards	42–340	40–219
Passing yards	184	263
Passing: Comp–Att–Int	9–20–0	32–46–0
Time of possession	29:22	30:38
