= 2014 Syracuse Orange football team =

American college football season

2014 Syracuse Orange football
- Conference: Atlantic Coast Conference
- Atlantic Division
- Record: 3–9 (1–7 ACC)
- Head coach: Scott Shafer (2nd season)
- Offensive coordinator: George McDonald (2nd season; first 5 games); Tim Lester (interim; rest of season)
- Offensive scheme: Pro-style
- Defensive coordinator: Chuck Bullough (2nd season)
- Base defense: 4–3
- Home stadium: Carrier Dome

2014 Atlantic Coast Conference football standings
	Conf.			Overall
Team	W		L	W		L
Atlantic Division
No. T–5 Florida State x$^	8	–	0	13	–	1
No. 15 Clemson	6	–	2	10	–	3
No. 24 Louisville	5	–	3	9	–	4
Boston College	4	–	4	7	–	6
NC State	3	–	5	8	–	5
Syracuse	1	–	7	3	–	9
Wake Forest	1	–	7	3	–	9
Coastal Division
No. 8 Georgia Tech x	6	–	2	11	–	3
Duke	5	–	3	9	–	4
North Carolina	4	–	4	6	–	7
Pittsburgh	4	–	4	6	–	7
Miami (FL)	3	–	5	6	–	7
Virginia Tech	3	–	5	7	–	6
Virginia	3	–	5	5	–	7
Championship: Florida State 37, Georgia Tech 35
^ – College Football Playoff participant; $ – Conference champion; x – Division champion/co-champions; Rankings from AP Poll

The 2014 Syracuse Orange football team represented Syracuse University in the 2014 NCAA Division I FBS football season. The Orange were led by second year head coach Scott Shafer and played their home games at the Carrier Dome. They were members of the Atlantic Division of the Atlantic Coast Conference. They finished the season 3–9, 1–7 in ACC play to finish in a tie for sixth place in the Atlantic Division.

== Schedule ==
Date	Time	Opponent	Site	TV	Result	Attendance
August 29	7:30 pm	No. 12 (FCS) Villanova*	Carrier Dome; Syracuse, NY	ESPN3	W 27–26 ^{2OT}	41,189
September 13	12:00 pm	at Central Michigan*	Kelly/Shorts Stadium; Mount Pleasant, MI	ESPNU	W 40–3	25,531
September 20	12:30 pm	Maryland*	Carrier Dome; Syracuse, NY	ACCN	L 20–34	40,511
September 27	8:00 pm	vs. No. 8 Notre Dame*	MetLife Stadium; East Rutherford, NJ	ABC	L 15–31	76,802
October 3	7:00 pm	Louisville	Carrier Dome; Syracuse, NY	ESPN	L 6–28	37,569
October 11	12:00 pm	No. 1 Florida State^{†}	Carrier Dome; Syracuse, NY	ESPN	L 20–38	43,295
October 18	12:00 pm	at Wake Forest	BB&T Field; Winston-Salem, NC	ACCRSN	W 30–7	25,107
October 25	7:00 pm	at No. 20 Clemson	Memorial Stadium; Clemson, SC	ESPNU	L 6–16	80,031
November 1	3:00 pm	NC State	Carrier Dome; Syracuse, NY	ACCRSN	L 17–24	40,787
November 8	12:30 pm	No. 22 Duke	Carrier Dome; Syracuse, NY	ACCN	L 10–27	39,331
November 22	3:30 pm	at Pittsburgh	Heinz Field; Pittsburgh, PA (rivalry)	ESPNU	L 7–30	32,549
November 29	12:30 pm	at Boston College	Alumni Stadium; Chestnut Hill, MA	ACCRSN	L 7–28	30,267
*Non-conference game; ^{†}Homecoming; Rankings from Coaches' Poll released prior to the game; All times are in Eastern time

== Game summaries ==
=== Villanova ===
	1	2	3	4	OT	2OT	Total
Wildcats	0	7	7	3	3	6	26
Orange	7	3	7	0	3	7	27

=== Central Michigan ===
	1	2	3	4	Total
Orange	0	17	16	7	40
Chippewas	3	0	0	0	3

=== Maryland ===
	1	2	3	4	Total
Terrapins	14	17	0	3	34
Orange	6	7	0	7	20

=== Notre Dame ===
	1	2	3	4	Total
Fighting Irish	0	14	7	10	31
Orange	0	3	0	12	15

=== Louisville ===
	1	2	3	4	Total
Cardinals	7	5	7	9	28
Orange	3	0	3	0	6

=== Florida State ===
	1	2	3	4	Total
Seminoles	10	14	7	7	38
Orange	0	6	7	7	20

=== Wake Forest ===
	1	2	3	4	Total
Orange	3	14	13	0	30
Demon Deacons	7	0	0	0	7

=== Clemson ===
	1	2	3	4	Total
Orange	3	3	0	0	6
Tigers	0	3	6	7	16

=== NC State ===
	1	2	3	4	Total
Wolfpack	3	6	8	7	24
Orange	0	7	7	3	17

=== Duke ===
	1	2	3	4	Total
Blue Devils	3	7	0	17	27
Orange	3	0	7	0	10

=== Pittsburgh ===
	1	2	3	4	Total
Orange	0	0	7	0	7
Panthers	7	10	3	10	30

=== Boston College ===
	1	2	3	4	Total
Orange	7	0	0	0	7
Eagles	7	7	7	7	28

== Personnel ==
=== Coaching staff ===
2014 Coaching staff
Head coach: Scott Shafer; Offensive coaches: Tim Lester – Offensive Coordinator/Quarterbacks/Recruiting Coordinator; George McDonald - Wide Receivers; DeAndre Smith – Running Backs; Joe Adam – Offensive Line; Bobby Acosta – Tight Ends; Defensive coaches: Chuck Bullough – Defensive Coordinator; Tim Daoust – Defensive Line/Assistant Head Coach; Clark Lea – Linebackers; Fred Reed – Defensive Backs Coach; Support staff: Bob Brotzki – Assistant Athletics Director for Player Development; William Hicks – Assistant Athletics Director for Athletic Performance; Steve Scarnecchia – Director of Football Operations; Michael Ghobrial – Graduate Assistant
