= 2014 Virginia Tech Hokies football team =

American college football season

2014 Virginia Tech Hokies football

Military Bowl champion

Military Bowl, W 33–17 vs. Cincinnati
- Conference: Atlantic Coast Conference
- Coastal Division
- Record: 7–6 (3–5 ACC)
- Head coach: Frank Beamer (28th season)
- Offensive coordinator: Scot Loeffler (2nd season)
- Offensive scheme: Pro-style
- Defensive coordinator: Bud Foster (20th season)
- Base defense: 4–4
- Home stadium: Lane Stadium

2014 Atlantic Coast Conference football standings
	Conf.			Overall
Team	W		L	W		L
Atlantic Division
No. T–5 Florida State x$^	8	–	0	13	–	1
No. 15 Clemson	6	–	2	10	–	3
No. 24 Louisville	5	–	3	9	–	4
Boston College	4	–	4	7	–	6
NC State	3	–	5	8	–	5
Syracuse	1	–	7	3	–	9
Wake Forest	1	–	7	3	–	9
Coastal Division
No. 8 Georgia Tech x	6	–	2	11	–	3
Duke	5	–	3	9	–	4
North Carolina	4	–	4	6	–	7
Pittsburgh	4	–	4	6	–	7
Miami (FL)	3	–	5	6	–	7
Virginia Tech	3	–	5	7	–	6
Virginia	3	–	5	5	–	7
Championship: Florida State 37, Georgia Tech 35
^ – College Football Playoff participant; $ – Conference champion; x – Division champion/co-champions; Rankings from AP Poll

The 2014 Virginia Tech Hokies football team represented the Virginia Tech in the 2014 NCAA Division I FBS football season. The Hokies were led by 28th-year head coach Frank Beamer and played their home games at Lane Stadium in Blacksburg, Virginia. They were members of the Coastal Division of the Atlantic Coast Conference. They finished the season 7–6, 3–5 in ACC play to finish in a three way tie for fifth place in the Coastal Division. They were invited to the Military Bowl where they defeated Cincinnati. They were also the only team to beat Ohio State, who would go on to win the 2014 National Championship.

== Personnel ==
=== Coaching staff ===
Name	Position	Seasons at Virginia Tech	Alma mater
Frank Beamer	Head coach	27	Virginia Tech (1969)
Scot Loeffler	Offensive coordinator/quarterbacks	1	Michigan (1996)
Shane Beamer	Associate head coach/Running backs	2	Virginia Tech (1999)
Stacy Searels	Offensive line	0	Auburn (1990)
Bryan Stinespring	Tight ends/recruiting coordinator	23	James Madison (1986)
Aaron Moorehead	Wide receivers	1	Illinois (2003)
Bud Foster	Defensive coordinator/Inside Linebackers	27	Murray State (1981)
Torrian Gray	Defensive backs/passing game coordinator	8	Virginia Tech (1996)
Charley Wiles	Defensive line/Running game coordinator	16	Murray State (1987)
Cornell Brown	Outside linebackers/Assistant defensive line	3	Virginia Tech (1997)

== Schedule ==
Date	Time	Opponent	Rank	Site	TV	Result	Attendance
August 30	4:00 p.m.	No. 19 (FCS) William & Mary*		Lane Stadium; Blacksburg, VA	ESPNews	W 34–9	62,722
September 6	8:00 p.m.	at No. 8 Ohio State*		Ohio Stadium; Columbus, OH	ESPN	W 35–21	107,517
September 13	12:00 p.m.	East Carolina*	No. 17	Lane Stadium; Blacksburg, VA	ESPN	L 21–28	63,267
September 20	12:00 p.m.	Georgia Tech		Lane Stadium; Blacksburg, VA (Battle of the Techs)	ESPN	L 24–27	62,318
September 27	12:30 p.m.	Western Michigan*^{†}		Lane Stadium; Blacksburg, VA	ACCN	W 35–17	59,625
October 4	12:30 p.m.	at North Carolina		Kenan Memorial Stadium; Chapel Hill, NC	ACCN	W 34–17	60,000
October 16	7:30 p.m.	at Pittsburgh		Heinz Field; Pittsburgh, PA	ESPN	L 16–21	43,125
October 23	8:00 p.m.	Miami (FL)		Lane Stadium; Blacksburg, VA (rivalry)	ESPN	L 6–30	64,007
November 1	12:30 p.m.	Boston College		Lane Stadium; Blacksburg, VA (rivalry)	ACCN	L 31–33	55,729
November 15	12:30 p.m.	at No. 19 Duke		Wallace Wade Stadium; Durham, NC	ACCN	W 17–16	30,107
November 22	12:30 p.m.	at Wake Forest		BB&T Field; Winston-Salem, NC	ACCN	L 3–6 ^{2OT}	27,820
November 28	8:00 p.m.	Virginia		Lane Stadium; Blacksburg, VA (rivalry)	ESPN	W 24–20	60,431
December 27	1:00 p.m.	vs. Cincinnati*		Navy–Marine Corps Memorial Stadium; Annapolis, MD (Military Bowl)	ESPN	W 33–17	34,277
*Non-conference game; ^{†}Homecoming; Rankings from AP Poll released prior to game; All times are in Eastern time

Schedule source:

== Game summaries ==
=== William & Mary ===
	1	2	3	4	Total
Tribe	3	3	3	0	9
Hokies	7	10	10	7	34

=== Ohio State ===
	1	2	3	4	Total
Hokies	14	7	0	14	35
Buckeyes	7	0	7	7	21

=== East Carolina ===
	1	2	3	4	Total
Pirates	21	0	0	7	28
Hokies	0	7	0	14	21

=== Georgia Tech ===
	1	2	3	4	Total
Yellow Jackets	3	7	0	17	27
Hokies	3	13	0	8	24

=== Western Michigan ===
	1	2	3	4	Total
Broncos	7	3	0	7	17
Hokies	18	0	14	3	35

=== North Carolina ===
	1	2	3	4	Total
Hokies	14	10	0	10	34
Tar Heels	3	0	0	14	17

=== Pittsburgh ===
	1	2	3	4	Total
Hokies	0	6	3	7	16
Panthers	7	7	0	7	21

=== Miami (FL) ===
	1	2	3	4	Total
Hurricanes	3	21	0	6	30
Hokies	0	0	0	6	6

=== Boston College ===
	1	2	3	4	Total
Eagles	0	14	9	10	33
Hokies	7	3	0	21	31

=== Duke ===
	1	2	3	4	Total
Hokies	0	7	3	7	17
Blue Devils	10	0	6	0	16

=== Wake Forest ===
	1	2	3	4	OT	2OT	Total
Hokies	0	0	0	0	3	0	3
Demon Deacons	0	0	0	0	3	3	6

The game was the first scoreless tie in college football since 2005 when Arkansas State defeated Florida Atlantic, 3-0, on October 22, 2005, in overtime.

All three field goals that were scored took place in overtime.

=== Virginia ===
	1	2	3	4	Total
Cavaliers	3	10	0	7	20
Hokies	3	7	7	7	24

=== Cincinnati ===
Team	1	2	3	4	Total
Bearcats	7	3	0	7	17
• Hokies	7	6	14	6	33

- Location: Annapolis, MD
- Game start: 1:00 p.m.
- Television network: ESPN

== Rankings ==
Ranking movements Legend: ██ Increase in ranking ██ Decrease in ranking — = Not ranked RV = Received votes
	Week																
Poll	Pre	1	2	3	4	5	6	7	8	9	10	11	12	13	14	15	Final
AP	RV	RV	17	RV	—	—	—	—	—	—	—	—	—	—	—	—	—
Coaches	RV	RV	19	RV	—	—	—	—	—	—	—	—	—	—	—	—	—
CFP	Not released									—	—	—	—	—	—	—	Not released
