= 2014 Duke Blue Devils football team =

American college football season

2014 Duke Blue Devils football

Sun Bowl, L 31–36 vs. Arizona State
- Conference: Atlantic Coast Conference
- Coastal Division
- Record: 9–4 (5–3 ACC)
- Head coach: David Cutcliffe (7th season)
- Offensive coordinator: Scottie Montgomery (1st season)
- Offensive scheme: Multiple
- Defensive coordinator: Jim Knowles (5th season)
- Base defense: 4–2–5
- MVP: Anthony Boone
- Captains: Anthony Boone; Kelby Brown; Jeremy Cash; Jamison Crowder; Laken Tomlinson
- Home stadium: Wallace Wade Stadium

2014 Atlantic Coast Conference football standings
	Conf.			Overall
Team	W		L	W		L
Atlantic Division
No. T–5 Florida State x$^	8	–	0	13	–	1
No. 15 Clemson	6	–	2	10	–	3
No. 24 Louisville	5	–	3	9	–	4
Boston College	4	–	4	7	–	6
NC State	3	–	5	8	–	5
Syracuse	1	–	7	3	–	9
Wake Forest	1	–	7	3	–	9
Coastal Division
No. 8 Georgia Tech x	6	–	2	11	–	3
Duke	5	–	3	9	–	4
North Carolina	4	–	4	6	–	7
Pittsburgh	4	–	4	6	–	7
Miami (FL)	3	–	5	6	–	7
Virginia Tech	3	–	5	7	–	6
Virginia	3	–	5	5	–	7
Championship: Florida State 37, Georgia Tech 35
^ – College Football Playoff participant; $ – Conference champion; x – Division champion/co-champions; Rankings from AP Poll

The 2014 Duke Blue Devils football team represented the Duke University in the 2014 NCAA Division I FBS football season as a member of the Atlantic Coast Conference (ACC) in the Coastal Division. The team was led by head coach David Cutcliffe, in his seventh year, and played its home games at Wallace Wade Stadium in Durham, North Carolina.

== Schedule ==
Date	Time	Opponent	Rank	Site	TV	Result	Attendance
August 30	6:00 pm	Elon*		Wallace Wade Stadium; Durham, NC	ESPN3	W 52–13	31,213
September 6	7:00 pm	at Troy*		Veterans Memorial Stadium; Troy, AL	ESPN3	W 34–17	21,331
September 13	3:30 pm	Kansas*		Wallace Wade Stadium; Durham, NC	ACCRSN	W 41–3	25,203
September 20	12:30 pm	Tulane*^{†}		Wallace Wade Stadium; Durham, NC	ACCRSN	W 47–13	20,197
September 27	7:30 pm	at Miami (FL)		Sun Life Stadium; Miami Gardens, FL	ESPN2	L 10–22	44,559
October 11	12:30 pm	at No. 22 Georgia Tech		Bobby Dodd Stadium; Atlanta, GA	ACCN	W 31–25	44,281
October 18	12:30 pm	Virginia		Wallace Wade Stadium; Durham, NC	ACCN	W 20–13	28,131
November 1	12:00 pm	at Pittsburgh	No. 24	Heinz Field; Pittsburgh, PA	ESPNU	W 51–48 ^{2OT}	39,293
November 8	12:30 pm	at Syracuse	No. 22	Carrier Dome; Syracuse, NY	ACCN	W 27–10	39,331
November 15	12:00 pm	Virginia Tech	No. 21	Wallace Wade Stadium; Durham, NC	ESPNU	L 16–17	30,107
November 20	7:30 pm	North Carolina		Wallace Wade Stadium; Durham, NC (Victory Bell)	ESPN	L 20–45	33,941
November 29	7:00 pm	Wake Forest		Wallace Wade Stadium; Durham, NC (rivalry)	ESPNU	W 41–21	22,247
December 27	2:00 pm	vs. No. 15 Arizona State*		Sun Bowl Stadium; El Paso, TX (Sun Bowl)	CBS	L 31–36	47,809
*Non-conference game; ^{†}Homecoming; Rankings from AP Poll and CFP Rankings after October 28 released prior to game; All times are in Eastern time

== Personnel ==
=== Coaching staff ===
Name	Position	Seasons at Duke	Alma mater
David Cutcliffe	Head Coach	7th	Alabama (1976)
Scottie Montgomery	Offensive coordinator/The Baxter Family Associate head coach/quarterbacks	2nd	Duke (1999)
John Latina	Offensive line/Assistant head coach/Running game coordinator	3rd	Virginia Tech (1981)
Jim Knowles	Defensive coordinator	4th	Cornell (1987)
Jim Collins	Assistant Defensive coordinator/linebackers	7th	Elon (1974)
Jeff Faris	Wide receivers	3rd	Duke (2011)
Zac Roper	Special teams coordinator/Tight ends/recruiting coordinator	7th	Ole Miss (2001)
Derek Jones	Assistant Special Teams coordinator/Defensive Backs	7th	Ole Miss (1996)
Re'quan Boyette	Running backs	3rd	Duke (2009)
Rick Petri	Defensive line	4th	Missouri–Rolla (1976)
Marcus Johnson	Offensive Quality Control	4th	Ole Miss (2004)
Patrick O'Connor	Defensive Quality Control	3rd	Dickinson College (2010)
Jackson Korman	Safeties Manager	2nd	Germantown Academy (2013)

== Game summaries ==
=== Elon ===
	1	2	3	4	Total
Phoenix	3	3	0	7	13
Blue Devils	7	21	10	14	52

=== At Troy ===
	1	2	3	4	Total
Blue Devils	3	21	7	3	34
Trojans	7	7	3	0	17

=== Kansas ===
	1	2	3	4	Total
Jayhawks	3	0	0	0	3
Blue Devils	17	3	14	7	41

=== Tulane ===
	1	2	3	4	Total
Green Wave	7	0	6	0	13
Blue Devils	16	3	14	14	47

=== At Miami (FL) ===
	1	2	3	4	Total
Blue Devils	0	7	3	0	10
Hurricanes	9	0	7	6	22

=== At Georgia Tech ===
	1	2	3	4	Total
Blue Devils	7	7	10	7	31
Yellow Jackets	3	9	0	13	25

=== Virginia ===
	1	2	3	4	Total
Cavaliers	0	10	3	0	13
Blue Devils	7	3	3	7	20

=== At Pittsburgh ===
	1	2	3	4	OT	2OT	Total
Blue Devils	14	14	3	7	7	6	51
Panthers	7	21	0	10	7	3	48

=== At Syracuse ===
	1	2	3	4	Total
Blue Devils	3	7	0	17	27
Orange	3	0	7	0	10

=== Virginia Tech ===
	1	2	3	4	Total
Hokies	0	7	3	7	17
Blue Devils	10	0	6	0	16

=== North Carolina ===
	1	2	3	4	Total
Tar Heels	21	7	10	7	45
Blue Devils	7	0	7	6	20

=== Wake Forest ===
	1	2	3	4	Total
Demon Deacons	7	7	7	0	21
Blue Devils	21	6	7	7	41

=== Vs. Arizona State (Sun Bowl) ===
	1	2	3	4	Total
Blue Devils	3	14	0	14	31
#15 Sun Devils	10	10	10	6	36

== Rankings ==
Ranking movements Legend: ██ Increase in ranking ██ Decrease in ranking — = Not ranked RV = Received votes
	Week																
Poll	Pre	1	2	3	4	5	6	7	8	9	10	11	12	13	14	15	Final
AP	RV	RV	RV	RV	RV	—	—	RV	RV	24	22	19	25	RV	RV	RV	RV
Coaches	RV	RV	RV	RV	23	RV	RV	RV	RV	24	20	19	25	RV	RV	RV	RV
CFP	Not released									24	22	21	—	—	—	—	Not released
