= 2014 Louisville Cardinals football team =

American college football season

2014 Louisville Cardinals football

Belk Bowl, L 14–37 vs. Georgia
- Conference: Atlantic Coast Conference
- Atlantic Division

Ranking
- Coaches: No. 24
- AP: No. 24
- Record: 9–4 (5–3 ACC)
- Head coach: Bobby Petrino (5th season)
- Offensive coordinator: Garrick McGee (1st season)
- Offensive scheme: Multiple
- Defensive coordinator: Todd Grantham (1st season)
- Base defense: 3–4
- Home stadium: Papa John's Cardinal Stadium

2014 Atlantic Coast Conference football standings
	Conf.			Overall
Team	W		L	W		L
Atlantic Division
No. T–5 Florida State x$^	8	–	0	13	–	1
No. 15 Clemson	6	–	2	10	–	3
No. 24 Louisville	5	–	3	9	–	4
Boston College	4	–	4	7	–	6
NC State	3	–	5	8	–	5
Syracuse	1	–	7	3	–	9
Wake Forest	1	–	7	3	–	9
Coastal Division
No. 8 Georgia Tech x	6	–	2	11	–	3
Duke	5	–	3	9	–	4
North Carolina	4	–	4	6	–	7
Pittsburgh	4	–	4	6	–	7
Miami (FL)	3	–	5	6	–	7
Virginia Tech	3	–	5	7	–	6
Virginia	3	–	5	5	–	7
Championship: Florida State 37, Georgia Tech 35
^ – College Football Playoff participant; $ – Conference champion; x – Division champion/co-champions; Rankings from AP Poll

The 2014 Louisville Cardinals football team represented the University of Louisville in the 2014 NCAA Division I FBS football season. The Cardinals were led by head coach Bobby Petrino, who began his second stint at Louisville after eight years away, seven of which were spent as a head coach at other colleges and in the National Football League (NFL). The team played its 17th season at Papa John's Cardinal Stadium in Louisville, Kentucky. They were in their first season as members of the Atlantic Coast Conference, having replaced departed member Maryland in the Atlantic Division. They finished the season 9–4, 5–3 in ACC play to finish in third place in the Atlantic Division. They were invited to the Belk Bowl, where they lost to Georgia.

== Schedule ==
Date	Time	Opponent	Rank	Site	TV	Result	Attendance
September 1	8:00 p.m.	Miami (FL)		Papa John's Cardinal Stadium; Louisville, KY (rivalry)	ESPN	W 31–13	55,428
September 6	7:00 p.m.	Murray State*	No. 25	Papa John's Cardinal Stadium; Louisville, KY	ESPN3	W 66–21	50,179
September 13	12:30 p.m.	at Virginia	No. 21	Scott Stadium; Charlottesville, VA	ACCN	L 21–23	34,816
September 20	3:30 p.m.	at FIU*		FIU Stadium; Miami, FL	FS1	W 34–3	10,826
September 27	3:30 p.m.	Wake Forest		Papa John's Cardinal Stadium; Louisville, KY	ESPNU	W 20–10	51,463
October 3	7:00 p.m.	at Syracuse		Carrier Dome; Syracuse, NY	ESPN	W 28–6	37,569
October 11	3:30 p.m.	at Clemson		Memorial Stadium; Clemson, SC	ESPNU	L 17–23	81,500
October 18	3:30 p.m.	NC State^{†}		Papa John's Cardinal Stadium; Louisville, KY	ACCRSN	W 30–12	50,227
October 30	7:30 p.m.	No. 2 Florida State	No. 25	Papa John's Cardinal Stadium; Louisville, KY	ESPN	L 31–42	55,414
November 8	7:15 p.m.	at Boston College		Alumni Stadium; Chestnut Hill, MA	ESPN2	W 38–19	33,565
November 22	3:30 p.m.	at Notre Dame*	No. 24	Notre Dame Stadium; Notre Dame, IN	NBC	W 31–28	80,795
November 29	12:00 p.m.	Kentucky*	No. 22	Papa John's Cardinal Stadium; Louisville, KY (Governor's Cup)	ESPN2	W 44–40	55,118
December 30	6:30 p.m.	vs. No. 13 Georgia*	No. 21	Bank of America Stadium; Charlotte, NC (Belk Bowl)	ESPN	L 14–37	45,671
*Non-conference game; ^{†}Homecoming; Rankings from AP Poll and CFP Rankings after October 28 released prior to game; All times are in Eastern time

== Game summaries ==
=== Miami ===
13th meeting. 2–9–1 all time. Last meeting 2013, Cardinals 36–9.

Miami Hurricanes vs Louisville Cardinals – Game summary

Quarter	1	2	3	4	Total
Miami	0	10	3	0	13
Louisville	7	7	7	10	31

at Papa John's Cardinal Stadium • Louisville, KY

- Date: September 1, 2014
- Game time: 8:00 p.m. EST
- Game weather: Temperature: • Wind: • Weather:
- Game attendance: 55,428
- Referee: Referee: • Umpire: • Linesman: • Line judge: • Back judge: • Field judge: • Side judge:
- TV announcers (ESPN): Rece Davis, Jesse Palmer, David Pollack, Samantha Ponder

Game information

First quarter

Second quarter

Third quarter

Fourth quarter

Top passers

- UM –
- UL –

Top rushers

- UM –
- UL –

Top receiver

- UM –
- UL –

Top tackler

- UM –
- UL –

=== Murray State ===
19th meeting. 12–6 all time. Last meeting 2011, Cardinals 21–9.

Murray State Racers vs #25 Louisville Cardinals – Game summary

Quarter	1	2	3	4	Total
Murray State	7	0	7	7	21
#25 Louisville	21	24	14	7	66

at Papa John's Cardinal Stadium • Louisville, KY

- Date: September 6, 2014
- Game time: 7:00 p.m. EST
- Game weather: Temperature: • Wind: • Weather:
- Game attendance: 50,179
- Referee: Referee: • Umpire: • Linesman: • Line judge: • Back judge: • Field judge: • Side judge:
- TV announcers (ESPN3): Shawn Kenney, Darius Walker, Lindsay Patterson

Game information

First quarter

Second quarter

Third quarter

Fourth quarter

Top passers

- MSU –
- UL –

Top rushers

- MSU –
- UL –

Top receiver

- MSU –
- UL –

Top tackler

- MSU –
- UL –

=== Virginia ===
3rd meeting. Tied 1–1. Last meeting 1989, Cavaliers 16–15.

#21 Louisville Cardinals vs Virginia Cavaliers – Game summary

Quarter	1	2	3	4	Total
#21 Louisville	7	0	0	14	21
Virginia	7	3	10	3	23

at Scott Stadium • Charlottesville, VA

- Date: September 13, 2014
- Game time: 12:30 p.m. EST
- Game weather: Temperature: • Wind: • Weather:
- Game attendance: 34,816
- Referee: Referee: • Umpire: • Linesman: • Line judge: • Back judge: • Field judge: • Side judge:
- TV announcers (ACCN): Tim Brant, Dave Archer, Rachel Baribeau

Game information

First quarter

Second quarter

Third quarter

Fourth quarter

Top passers

- UL –
- UVA –

Top rushers

- UL –
- UVA –

Top receiver

- UL –
- UVA –

Top tackler

- UL –
- UVA –

=== FIU ===
4th meeting. 2–1 all time. Last meeting 2013, Cardinals 72–0.

Louisville Cardinals vs FIU Panthers – Game summary

Quarter	1	2	3	4	Total
Louisville	7	21	6	0	34
FIU	0	3	0	0	3

at FIU Stadium • Miami, FL

- Date: September 20, 2014
- Game time: 3:30 p.m. EST
- Game weather: Temperature: • Wind: • Weather:
- Game attendance: 10,826
- Referee: Referee: • Umpire: • Linesman: • Line judge: • Back judge: • Field judge: • Side judge:
- TV announcers (FS1): Craig Bolerjack, Ryan Nece

Game information

First quarter

Second quarter

Third quarter

Fourth quarter

Top passers

- UL –
- FIU –

Top rushers

- UL –
- FIU –

Top receiver

- UL –
- FIU –

Top tackler

- UL –
- FIU –

=== Wake Forest ===
2nd meeting. 1–0 all time. Last meeting 2007, 24–13 Cardinals.

Wake Forest Demon Deacons vs Louisville Cardinals – Game summary

Quarter	1	2	3	4	Total
Wake Forest	3	0	7	0	10
Louisville	0	7	0	13	20

at Papa John's Cardinal Stadium • Louisville, KY

- Date: September 27, 2014
- Game time: 3:30 p.m. EST
- Game weather: Temperature: • Wind: • Weather:
- Game attendance: 51,463
- Referee: Referee: • Umpire: • Linesman: • Line judge: • Back judge: • Field judge: • Side judge:
- TV announcers (ESPNU): Clay Matvick, Anthony Becht

Game information

First quarter

Second quarter

Third quarter

Fourth quarter

Top passers

- WF –
- UL –

Top rushers

- WF –
- UL –

Top receiver

- WF –
- UL –

Top tackler

- WF –
- UL –

=== Syracuse ===
2nd meeting. Tied 6–6. Last meeting 2012, 45–26 Orange.

Louisville Cardinals vs Syracuse Orange – Game summary

Quarter	1	2	3	4	Total
Louisville	7	5	7	9	28
Syracuse	3	0	3	0	6

at Carrier Dome • Syracuse, NY

- Date: October 3, 2014
- Game time: 7:00 p.m. EST
- Game weather: Temperature: • Wind: • Weather:
- Game attendance: 37,569
- Referee: Referee: • Umpire: • Linesman: • Line judge: • Back judge: • Field judge: • Side judge:
- TV announcers (ESPN): Ryan Ruocco, Danny Kanell, Niki Noto

Game information

First quarter

Second quarter

Third quarter

Fourth quarter

Top passers

- UL –
- SU –

Top rushers

- UL –
- SU –

Top receiver

- UL –
- SU –

Top tackler

- UL –
- SU –

=== Clemson ===
1st meeting.

Louisville Cardinals vs Clemson Tigers – Game summary

Quarter	1	2	3	4	Total
Louisville	3	7	7	0	17
Clemson	7	7	6	3	23

at Memorial Stadium • Clemson, SC

- Date: October 11, 2014
- Game time: 3:30 p.m. EST
- Game weather: Temperature: • Wind: • Weather:
- Game attendance: 81,500
- Referee: Referee: • Umpire: • Linesman: • Line judge: • Back judge: • Field judge: • Side judge:
- TV announcers (ESPNU): Anish Shroff, Kelly Stouffer, Cara Capuano

Game information

First quarter

Second quarter

Third quarter

Fourth quarter

Top passers

- UL –
- CU –

Top rushers

- UL –
- CU –

Top receiver

- UL –
- CU –

Top tackler

- UL –
- CU –

=== NC State ===
5th meeting. 3–1 all time. Last meeting 2011, Wolfpack 31–24.

NC State Wolfpack vs Louisville Cardinals – Game summary

Quarter	1	2	3	4	Total
NC State	6	0	3	9	18
Louisville	7	10	3	10	30

at Papa John's Cardinal Stadium • Louisville, KY

- Date: October 18, 2014
- Game time: 3:30 p.m. EST
- Game weather: Temperature: • Wind: • Weather:
- Game attendance: 50,227
- Referee: Referee: • Umpire: • Linesman: • Line judge: • Back judge: • Field judge: • Side judge:
- TV announcers (Fox Sports 1): Wes Durham, James Bates, Hans Heiserer

Game information

First quarter

Second quarter

Third quarter

Fourth quarter

Top passers

- NCST –
- UL –

Top rushers

- NCST –
- UL –

Top receiver

- NCST –
- UL –

Top tackler

- NCST –
- UL –

=== Florida State ===
15th meeting. 2–12 all time. Last meeting 2002, Cardinals 26–20.

Florida State Seminoles vs Louisville Cardinals – Game summary

Quarter	1	2	3	4	Total
#2 Florida State	0	7	14	21	42
#25 Louisville	0	21	3	7	31

at Papa John's Cardinal Stadium • Louisville, KY

- Date: October 30, 2014
- Game time: 7:30 p.m. EST
- Game weather: Temperature: • Wind: • Weather:
- Game attendance:
- Referee: Referee: • Umpire: • Linesman: • Line judge: • Back judge: • Field judge: • Side judge:
- TV announcers (ESPN): Rece Davis, Jesse Palmer, David Pollack, Samantha Ponder

Game information

First quarter

Second quarter

Third quarter

Fourth quarter

Top passers

- FSU – Winston 401YDS 3TD 3 Int
- UL – Garner 330 YDS 1 TD 1 Int

Top rushers

- FSU – Cook 110 YDS 2 TD
- UL – Dyer 134 YDS 3 TD

Top receiver

- FSU – Rudolph 76 YDS 1 TD
- UL – Parker 218 YDS

Top tackler

- FSU –
- UL –

=== Boston College ===
7th meeting. Tied 3–3. Last meeting 1998, Cardinals 52–28.

Louisville Cardinals vs Boston College Eagles – Game summary

Quarter	1	2	3	4	Total
Louisville	3	14	7	14	38
Boston College	7	6	6	0	19

at Alumni Stadium • Chesnut Hill, MA

- Date: November 8, 2014
- Game time: 7:15 p.m. EST
- Game weather: Temperature: • Wind: • Weather:
- Game attendance:
- Referee: Referee: • Umpire: • Linesman: • Line judge: • Back judge: • Field judge: • Side judge:
- TV announcers (ESPN2): Bob Wischusen, Matt Millen, Quint Kessenich

Game information

First quarter

Second quarter

Third quarter

Fourth quarter

Top passers

- UL –
- BC –

Top rushers

- UL –
- BC –

Top receiver

- UL –
- BC –

Top tackler

- UL –
- BC –

=== Notre Dame ===
1st meeting.

Louisville Cardinals vs Notre Dame Fighting Irish – Game summary

Quarter	1	2	3	4	Total
#24 Louisville	14	3	7	7	31
Notre Dame	3	3	14	8	28

at Notre Dame Stadium • South Bend, IN

- Date: November 22, 2014
- Game time: 3:30 p.m. EST
- Game weather: Temperature: • Wind: • Weather:
- Game attendance:
- Referee: Referee: • Umpire: • Linesman: • Line judge: • Back judge: • Field judge: • Side judge:
- TV announcers (NBC): Dan Hicks, Mike Mayock, Doug Flutie, Kathryn Tappen

Game information

First quarter

Second quarter

Third quarter

Fourth quarter

Top passers

- UL –
- ND –

Top rushers

- UL –
- ND –

Top receiver

- UL –
- ND –

Top tackler

- UL –
- ND –

=== Kentucky ===
27th meeting. 12–14 all time. Last meeting 2013, Cardinals 27–13.

Kentucky Wildcats vs Louisville Cardinals – Game summary

Quarter	1	2	3	4	Total
Kentucky	6	14	3	17	40
#22 Louisville	0	21	7	16	44

at Papa John's Cardinal Stadium • Louisville, KY

- Date: November 29, 2014
- Game time: Noon EST
- Game weather: Temperature: • Wind: • Weather:
- Game attendance: 45,671
- Referee: Referee: • Umpire: • Linesman: • Line judge: • Back judge: • Field judge: • Side judge:
- TV announcers (ESPN2): Beth Mowins, Joey Galloway, Paul Carcaterra

Game information

First quarter

Second quarter

Third quarter

Fourth quarter

Top passers

- UK –
- UL –

Top rushers

- UK –
- UL –

Top receiver

- UK –
- UL –

Top tackler

- UK –
- UL –

== Coaching staff ==
2014 Louisville Cardinals football staff
Coaching Staff: Bobby Petrino – Head Coach; Garrick McGee – Asst. Head coach/offensive coordinator/QB Coach; Todd Grantham – Defensive coordinator/Outside linebackers; Chris Klenakis – Run Game Coordinator/offensive line; Tony Grantham – Inside linebackers/special teams; Greg Brown – Recruiting coordinator/safeties; L.D. Scott – Defensive line; Kolby Smith – Running backs; Lamar Thomas- Wide receivers; Terrell Buckley- Cornerbacks	Support Staff: Mike Kurowski – Dir. of Athletic Equipment Operations; Denise Murphy – Administrative Asst.; Jonathan Saxon – Defensive graduate assistant; Will Stein – Offensive graduate assistant; Larry Slade – Dir. of Community Relations and Career Preparations; David Spina – Director of Video Operations; Andrew Wolfrum – Defensive Quality Control	Strength and Conditioning Staff: Kyle Johnston – Head Athletic Trainer; Chad Lee – Assistant strength coach; Joshua Chatman – Assistant Athletic Trainer; Blake LeBlanc – Rehabilitation Coordinator; Kevin Ozimek – Assistant Athletic Trainer; Sam Zuege – Assistant Athletic Trainer

== Rankings ==
Ranking movements Legend: ██ Increase in ranking ██ Decrease in ranking — = Not ranked RV = Received votes
	Week																
Poll	Pre	1	2	3	4	5	6	7	8	9	10	11	12	13	14	15	Final
AP	RV	25	21	RV	—	RV	RV	RV	RV	RV	RV	RV	RV	24	21	20	24
Coaches	RV	RV	RV	RV	RV	RV	RV	—	—	RV	RV	RV	RV	23	20	20	24
CFP	Not released									25	—	—	24	22	21	21	Not released
