= 2014 ACC Championship Game =

2014 Dr. Pepper ACC Championship Game
- Conference Championship
Florida State Seminoles	Georgia Tech Yellow Jackets
(12–0)	(10–2)
37	35
Head coach: Jimbo Fisher	Head coach: Paul Johnson
AP / Coaches / CFP; 2 / 2 / 4	AP / Coaches / CFP; 12 / 12 / 11
	1	2	3	4	Total
Florida State	7	21	3	6	37
Georgia Tech	14	7	7	7	35
- Date: December 6, 2014
- Season: 2014
- Stadium: Bank of America Stadium
- Location: Charlotte, North Carolina
- MVP: Dalvin Cook (RB, Florida State)
- Favorite: Florida State by 3.5
- Referee: Gary Patterson

United States TV coverage
- Network: ABC
- Announcers: Chris Fowler (Play by Play); Kirk Herbstreit (Analyst); Heather Cox (Sidelines)

2014 Atlantic Coast Conference football standings
	Conf.			Overall
Team	W		L	W		L
Atlantic Division
No. T–5 Florida State x$^	8	–	0	13	–	1
No. 15 Clemson	6	–	2	10	–	3
No. 24 Louisville	5	–	3	9	–	4
Boston College	4	–	4	7	–	6
NC State	3	–	5	8	–	5
Syracuse	1	–	7	3	–	9
Wake Forest	1	–	7	3	–	9
Coastal Division
No. 8 Georgia Tech x	6	–	2	11	–	3
Duke	5	–	3	9	–	4
North Carolina	4	–	4	6	–	7
Pittsburgh	4	–	4	6	–	7
Miami (FL)	3	–	5	6	–	7
Virginia Tech	3	–	5	7	–	6
Virginia	3	–	5	5	–	7
Championship: Florida State 37, Georgia Tech 35
^ – College Football Playoff participant; $ – Conference champion; x – Division champion/co-champions; Rankings from AP Poll

The 2014 ACC Championship Game is the tenth football championship game for the Atlantic Coast Conference. It featured the Florida State Seminoles, winners of the ACC's Atlantic Division, and the Georgia Tech Yellow Jackets, winners of the ACC's Coastal Division. This was the game's fifth consecutive year at Bank of America Stadium in Charlotte, North Carolina.

== Scoring summary ==
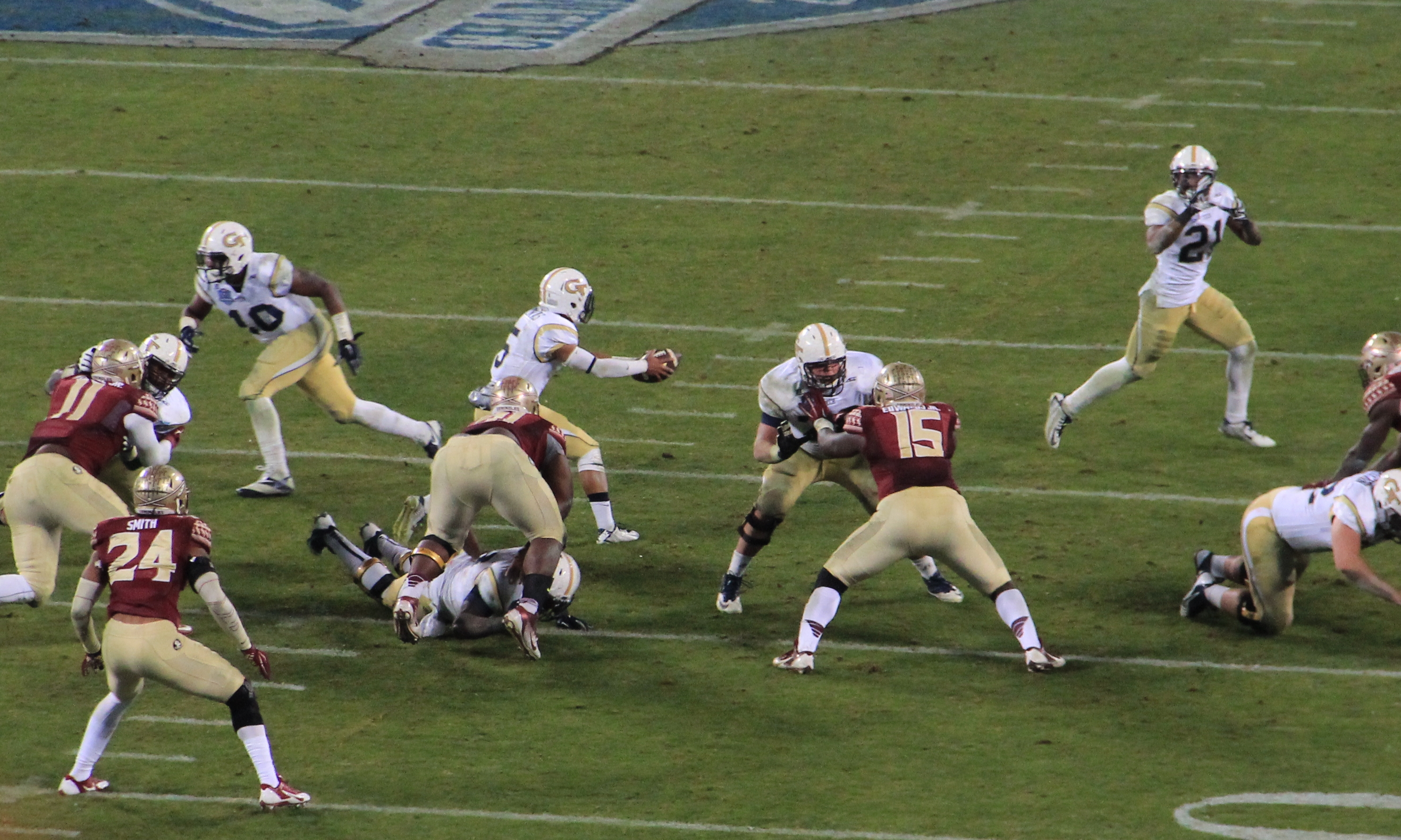
Georgia Tech on offense

1st quarter scoring:

- GT - TD 09:50 Synjyn Days 1 Yd Run (Harrison Butker Kick) FSU 0 GT 7
- FSU - TD 07:42 Nick O'Leary 46 Yd Pass from Jameis Winston (Roberto Aguayo Kick) FSU 7 GT 7
- GT - TD 01:45 Synjyn Days 1 Yd Run (Harrison Butker Kick) FSU 7 GT 14

2nd quarter scoring:

- FSU - TD 14:10 Dalvin Cook 1 Yd Run (Roberto Aguayo Kick) FSU 14 GT 14
- GT - TD 08:02 Zach Laskey 4 Yd Run (Harrison Butker Kick) FSU 14 GT 21
- FSU - TD 05:40 Rashad Greene 44 Yd pass from Jameis Winston (Roberto Aguayo Kick) FSU 21 GT 21
- FSU - TD 00:30 Rashad Greene 9 Yd pass from Jameis Winston (Roberto Aguayo Kick) FSU 28 GT 21

3rd quarter scoring:

- GT - TD 08:01 Synjyn Days 1 Yd Run (Harrison Butker Kick) FSU 28 GT 28
- FSU - FG 03:13 Roberto Aguayo 33 Yd Field Goal FSU 31 GT 28

4th quarter scoring:

- FSU - FG 10:25 Roberto Aguayo 32 Yd Field Goal FSU 34 GT 28
- FSU - FG 04:28 Roberto Aguayo 28 Yd Field Goal FSU 37 GT 28
- GT - TD 01:47 Darren Waller 25 Yd pass from Justin Thomas (Harrison Butker Kick) FSU 37 GT 35

=== Statistics ===
Statistics	FSU	GT
First downs	24	28
Total yards	488	465
Rushes-yards (net)	33–179	59–331
Passing yards (net)	309	134
Passes, Comp-Att-Int	21–30–0	8–14–1
Time of Possession	25:05	34:55
