= 2014 North Carolina Tar Heels football team =

American college football season

2014 North Carolina Tar Heels football

Quick Lane Bowl, L 21–40 vs. Rutgers
- Conference: Atlantic Coast Conference
- Coastal Division
- Record: 6–7 (4–4 ACC)
- Head coach: Larry Fedora (3rd season)
- Co-offensive coordinators: Seth Littrell (1st season); Chris Kapilovic (1st season)
- Offensive scheme: Spread
- Co-defensive coordinators: Dan Disch (3rd season); Ron West (2nd season)
- Base defense: 4–2–5
- Captains: Marquise Williams; Landon Turner; Ethan Farmer; Norkeithus Otis; Mack Hollins
- Home stadium: Kenan Memorial Stadium

Uniform
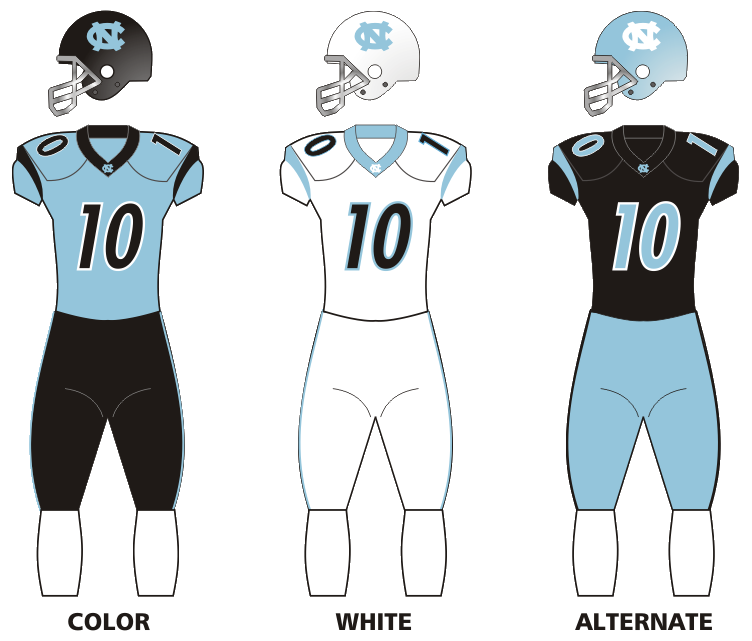

2014 Atlantic Coast Conference football standings
	Conf.			Overall
Team	W		L	W		L
Atlantic Division
No. T–5 Florida State x$^	8	–	0	13	–	1
No. 15 Clemson	6	–	2	10	–	3
No. 24 Louisville	5	–	3	9	–	4
Boston College	4	–	4	7	–	6
NC State	3	–	5	8	–	5
Syracuse	1	–	7	3	–	9
Wake Forest	1	–	7	3	–	9
Coastal Division
No. 8 Georgia Tech x	6	–	2	11	–	3
Duke	5	–	3	9	–	4
North Carolina	4	–	4	6	–	7
Pittsburgh	4	–	4	6	–	7
Miami (FL)	3	–	5	6	–	7
Virginia Tech	3	–	5	7	–	6
Virginia	3	–	5	5	–	7
Championship: Florida State 37, Georgia Tech 35
^ – College Football Playoff participant; $ – Conference champion; x – Division champion/co-champions; Rankings from AP Poll

The 2014 North Carolina Tar Heels football team represented the University of North Carolina at Chapel Hill as a member of Coastal Division of the Atlantic Coast Conference (ACC) during the 2014 NCAA Division I FBS football season. The team was led by third-year head coach Larry Fedora and played their home games at Kenan Memorial Stadium. They finished the season 6–7 overall and 4–4 in ACC play to tie for third place in the Coastal Division. They were invited to the Quick Lane Bowl, where they lost to Rutgers.

== Schedule ==
Date	Time	Opponent	Rank	Site	TV	Result	Attendance
August 30	6:00 p.m.	Liberty*	No. 23	Kenan Memorial Stadium; Chapel Hill, NC	ESPN3	W 56–29	51,000
September 6	8:00 p.m.	San Diego State*	No. 21	Kenan Memorial Stadium; Chapel Hill, NC	ESPNews	W 31–27	58,000
September 20	3:30 p.m.	at East Carolina*		Dowdy–Ficklen Stadium; Greenville, NC	ESPNU	L 41–70	51,082
September 27	7:00 p.m.	at Clemson		Memorial Stadium; Clemson, SC	ESPNU	L 35–50	80,599
October 4	12:30 p.m.	Virginia Tech		Kenan Memorial Stadium; Chapel Hill, NC	ACCN	L 17–34	60,000
October 11	3:30 p.m.	at No. 6 Notre Dame*		Notre Dame Stadium; Notre Dame, IN (rivalry)	NBC	L 43–50	80,795
October 18	7:00 p.m.	Georgia Tech		Kenan Memorial Stadium; Chapel Hill, NC	ESPNU	W 48–43	53,000
October 25	12:30 p.m.	at Virginia		Scott Stadium; Charlottesville, VA (South's Oldest Rivalry)	ACCN	W 28–27	45,200
November 1	12:30 p.m.	at Miami (FL)		Sun Life Stadium; Miami Gardens, FL	ACCN	L 20–47	51,702
November 15	12:30 p.m.	Pittsburgh^{†}		Kenan Memorial Stadium; Chapel Hill, NC	ACCN	W 40–35	53,000
November 20	7:30 p.m.	at No. 25 Duke		Wallace Wade Stadium; Durham, NC (Victory Bell)	ESPN	W 45–20	33,941
November 29	12:30 p.m.	NC State		Kenan Memorial Stadium; Chapel Hill, NC (rivalry)	ACCN	L 7–35	53,000
December 26	4:30 p.m.	vs. Rutgers*		Ford Field; Detroit, MI (Quick Lane Bowl)	ESPN	L 21–40	23,876
*Non-conference game; ^{†}Homecoming; Rankings from AP Poll released prior to the game; All times are in Eastern time

== Rankings ==
Ranking movements Legend: ██ Increase in ranking ██ Decrease in ranking — = Not ranked RV = Received votes
	Week																
Poll	Pre	1	2	3	4	5	6	7	8	9	10	11	12	13	14	15	Final
AP	23	21	RV	RV	—	—	—	—	—	—	—	—	—	—	—	—	—
Coaches	23	23	25	25	—	RV	—	—	—	—	—	—	—	—	—	—	—
CFP	Not released									—	—	—	—	—	—	—	Not released

== Game summaries ==
=== Liberty ===
	1	2	3	4	Total
Flames	7	8	7	7	29
Tar Heels	14	7	28	7	56

=== San Diego State ===
	1	2	3	4	Total
Aztecs	0	14	7	6	27
Tar Heels	0	7	7	17	31

=== East Carolina ===
	1	2	3	4	Total
Tar Heels	13	7	7	14	41
Pirates	14	21	21	14	70

=== Clemson ===
	1	2	3	4	Total
Tar Heels	0	7	14	14	35
Tigers	10	12	14	14	50

=== Virginia Tech ===
	1	2	3	4	Total
Hokies	14	10	0	10	34
Tar Heels	3	0	0	14	17

=== Notre Dame ===
	1	2	3	4	Total
Tar Heels	14	12	10	7	43
Fighting Irish	7	21	7	15	50

=== Georgia Tech ===
	1	2	3	4	Total
Yellow Jackets	7	10	7	19	43
Tar Heels	7	14	14	13	48

=== Virginia ===
	1	2	3	4	Total
Tar Heels	14	7	0	7	28
Cavaliers	14	10	3	0	27

=== At Miami (FL) ===
North Carolina Tar Heels (4–4) at Miami (FL) Hurricanes (5–3)

Quarter	1	2	3	4	Total
North Carolina	0	6	7	7	20
Miami (FL)	7	23	14	3	47

at Sun Life Stadium, Miami Gardens, Florida

- Date: November 1
- Game time: 12:30 p.m. EST
- Game weather: Partly cloudy, 79 °F (26 °C)
- Game attendance: 51,702
- Referee: J. Magallanes
- TV announcers (ACC Network): Tim Brant, David Archer, Rachel Baribeau
- Box Score

Game information

First quarter

- UM – Duke Johnson 1-yard run (Michael Badgley kick), 5:43. Miami (FL) 7–0. Drive: 13 plays, 84 yards, 7:10.

Second quarter

- UM – Safety. Miami (FL) 9–0
- UNC – Cayson Collins 39-yard fumble return (kick failed), 13:37. Miami (FL) 9–6.
- UM – Clive Walford 14-yard pass from Brad Kaaya (Michael Badgley kick), 5:17. Miami (FL) 16–6. Drive: 7 plays, 61 yards, 3:57.
- UM – Duke Johnson 90-yard run (Michael Badgley kick), 2:55. Miami (FL) 23–6. Drive: 1 play, 90 yards, 0:13.
- UM – Clive Walford 14-yard pass from Brad Kaaya (Michael Badgley kick), 0:26. Miami (FL) 30–6. Drive: 7 plays, 56 yards, 1:51.

Third quarter

- UM – Duke Johnson 37-yard pass from Brad Kaaya (Michael Badgley kick), 12:37. Miami (FL) 37–6. Drive: 5 plays, 75 yards, 2:23.
- UM – Joe Yearby 1-yard run (Michael Badgley kick), 7:12. Miami (FL) 44–6. Drive: 3 plays, 12 yards, 1:19.
- UNC – Marquise Williams 10-yard run (Thomas Moore kick), 5:11. Miami (FL) 44–13. Drive: 6 plays, 65 yards, 2:01.

Fourth quarter

- UM – Michael Badgley 37-yard field goal, 13:19. Miami (FL) 47–13. Drive: 7 plays, 30 yards, 3:01.
- UNC – Marquise Williams 1-yard run (Thomas Moore kick), 9:20. Miami (FL) 47–20. Drive: 11 plays, 75 yards, 3:59.

Top passers

- UNC – Marquise Williams – 22/32, 186 yards, INT
- UM – Brad Kaaya – 11/17, 189 yards, 3 TD

Top rushers

- UNC – Romar Morris – 5 rushes, 23 yards
- UM – Duke Johnson – 19 rushes, 177 yards, 2 TD

Top receivers

- UNC – T.J. Thorpe – 4 receptions, 66 yards
- UM – Clive Walford – 6 receptions, 89 yards, 2 TD

=== Pittsburgh ===
	1	2	3	4	Total
Panthers	14	7	7	7	35
Tar Heels	0	13	13	14	40

=== Duke ===
	1	2	3	4	Total
Tar Heels	21	7	10	7	45
Blue Devils	7	0	7	6	20

=== NC State ===
	1	2	3	4	Total
Wolfpack	7	14	7	7	35
Tar Heels	0	0	0	7	7

=== Rutgers (Quick Lane Bowl) ===
	1	2	3	4	Total
Scarlet Knights	7	16	7	10	40
Tar Heels	0	0	7	14	21

== Personnel ==
North Carolina head coach Larry Fedora entered his third year as the North Carolina's head coach for the 2014 season. Seth Littrell was hired to be the team's assistant head coach for offense and tight ends coach. Keith Heckendorf, formerly UNC’s player development assistant, became the team's quarterbacks coach. Larry Porter was hired to coach running backs and previously coached running backs at Arizona State, Louisiana State and Oklahoma State, among other schools, before spending the 2013 season at Texas. He also was the head coach at Memphis in 2010 and 2011.

Coaches for the 2014 season
Name	Position	Seasons at North Carolina
Larry Fedora	Head coach	3rd
Gunter Brewer	Co-offensive coordinator/wide receivers	3rd (8th overall)
Chris Kapilovic	Co-offensive coordinator/offensive line	1st (3rd overall)
Seth Littrell	Assistant head coach for offense/tight ends	1st
Keith Heckendorf	Quarterbacks	1st
Dan Disch	Co-defensive coordinator/cornerbacks	3rd
Keith Gilmore	Defensive line	2nd
Lou Hernandez	Strength and conditioning coordinator	3rd
Vic Koenning	Associate head coach for defense/safeties	3rd
Ron West	Co-defensive coordinator/linebackers	2nd
Caleb Pressley	Supervisor of Morale	1st

2014 North Carolina Tar Heels football team roster
Players
Coaches
Offense

Pos.	#	Name	Class
RB	1	Khris Francis	So
WR	3	Ryan Switzer	So
WR	5	T.J. Thorpe	Jr
WR	7	Austin Proehl	Fr
RB	8	T. J. Logan	So
QB	10	Mitchell Trubisky	Fr
QB	12	Marquise Williams	Jr
WR	13	Mack Hollins	So
RB	21	Romar Morris	Jr
WR	35	Damien Washington	Jr
WR	81	Kendrick Singleton	Jr
WR	84	Bug Howard	So

Defense

Pos.	#	Name	Class
LB	23	Cayson Collins	Fr

Special teams

Pos.	#	Name	Class
K	18	Thomas Moore	Sr
K	24	Nick Weiler	So

Head coach

- Larry Fedora

Coordinators/assistant coaches

Legend

- (C) Team captain
- (S) Suspended
- (I) Ineligible
- Injured
- Redshirt

Roster
Last update: 2020-Nov-26
