= 2014 Boston College Eagles football team =

American college football season

2014 Boston College Eagles football
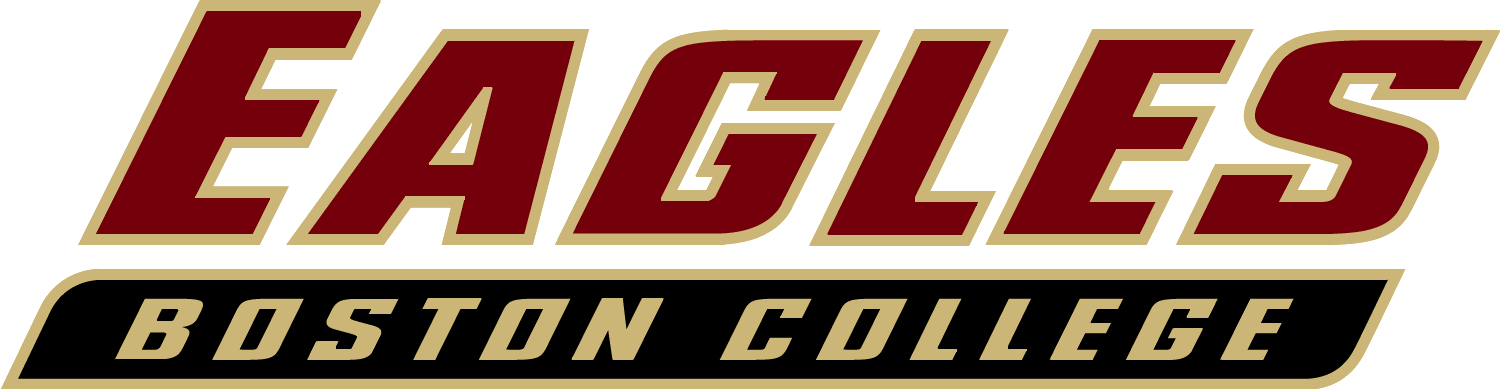

Pinstripe Bowl, L 30–31 ^{OT} vs. Penn State
- Conference: Atlantic Coast Conference
- Atlantic Division
- Record: 7–6 (4–4 ACC)
- Head coach: Steve Addazio (2nd season)
- Offensive coordinator: Ryan Day (2nd season)
- Offensive scheme: Spread
- Defensive coordinator: Don Brown (2nd season)
- Base defense: 4–3
- Captains: Josh Bordner; Sean Duggan; Andy Gallik; Dominique Williams
- Home stadium: Alumni Stadium

2014 Atlantic Coast Conference football standings
	Conf.			Overall
Team	W		L	W		L
Atlantic Division
No. T–5 Florida State x$^	8	–	0	13	–	1
No. 15 Clemson	6	–	2	10	–	3
No. 24 Louisville	5	–	3	9	–	4
Boston College	4	–	4	7	–	6
NC State	3	–	5	8	–	5
Syracuse	1	–	7	3	–	9
Wake Forest	1	–	7	3	–	9
Coastal Division
No. 8 Georgia Tech x	6	–	2	11	–	3
Duke	5	–	3	9	–	4
North Carolina	4	–	4	6	–	7
Pittsburgh	4	–	4	6	–	7
Miami (FL)	3	–	5	6	–	7
Virginia Tech	3	–	5	7	–	6
Virginia	3	–	5	5	–	7
Championship: Florida State 37, Georgia Tech 35
^ – College Football Playoff participant; $ – Conference champion; x – Division champion/co-champions; Rankings from AP Poll

The 2014 Boston College Eagles football team represented Boston College as a member of the Atlantic Division of the Atlantic Coast Conference (ACC) in the 2014 NCAA Division I FBS football season. They were led by second-year head coach Steve Addazio and played their home games at Alumni Stadium. They were ]. They finished the season 7–6 overall and 4–4 in ACC play place fourth in the Atlantic Division. They were invited to the Pinstripe Bowl, where they lost in overtime to Penn State.

== Schedule ==
Date	Time	Opponent	Site	TV	Result	Attendance
August 30	3:00 p.m.	at UMass*	Gillette Stadium; Foxboro, MA (rivalry)	ESPN3	W 30–7	30,479
September 5	7:00 p.m.	Pittsburgh	Alumni Stadium; Chestnut Hill, MA	ESPN	L 20–30	30,083
September 13	8:00 p.m.	No. 9 USC*	Alumni Stadium; Chestnut Hill, MA	ESPN	W 37–31	41,632
September 20	1:00 p.m.	Maine*	Alumni Stadium; Chestnut Hill, MA	ESPN3	W 40–10	28,676
September 27	12:30 p.m.	Colorado State*	Alumni Stadium; Chestnut Hill, MA	Fox Sports Net	L 21–24	33,632
October 11	3:30 p.m.	at NC State	Carter–Finley Stadium; Raleigh, NC	Fox Sports Net	W 30–14	49,125
October 18	3:30 p.m.	No. 24 Clemson^{†}	Alumni Stadium; Chestnut Hill, MA (O'Rourke–McFadden Trophy)	ESPNU	L 13–17	42,038
October 25	3:30 p.m.	at Wake Forest	BB&T Field; Winston-Salem, NC	Fox Sports Net	W 23–17	26,439
November 1	12:30 p.m.	at Virginia Tech	Lane Stadium; Blacksburg, VA (rivalry)	Raycom	W 33–31	55,729
November 8	7:15 p.m.	Louisville	Alumni Stadium; Chestnut Hill, MA	ESPN2	L 19–38	33,565
November 22	3:30 p.m.	at No. 1 Florida State	Doak Campbell Stadium; Tallahassee, FL	ABC/ESPN2	L 17–20	82,300
November 29	12:30 p.m.	Syracuse	Alumni Stadium; Chestnut Hill, MA	Fox Sports Net	W 28–7	30,267
December 27	4:30 p.m.	vs. Penn State*	Yankee Stadium; Bronx, NY (Pinstripe Bowl)	ESPN	L 30–31 ^{OT}	49,012
*Non-conference game; ^{†}Homecoming; Rankings from AP Poll released prior to the game; All times are in Eastern time

== Game summaries ==
=== @ UMass ===
	1	2	3	4	Total
Eagles	0	6	14	10	30
Minutemen	0	0	7	0	7

The Eagles opened up the season with a dominating 30–7 win over rival Massachusetts. After a slow start for both teams, ending the half 6–0 BC, the game opened up as BC scored three touchdowns on three possessions to open the second half, using their considerable size advantage to overpower the Minutemen's defensive line. UMass managed to get on the board in the third quarter with a 77-yard passing touchdown but could not muster anything else against a stifling BC defense. The victory was BC's eighth in row in the series, with the next meeting scheduled for 2016.

Quarterback Tyler Murphy shined in his debut, throwing 173 yards for 1 touchdown and rushing 118 yards and 1 touchdown. Sophomore running backs Tyler Rouse and Myles Willis contributed to an overall-team 338 yard rushing attack with 87 and 57 yard efforts, respectively. Senior wide receiver Josh Bordner caught 81 yards and 1 touchdown. Two freshman kickers, Alex Howell and Joey Launceford made their debuts as well, both attempting two field goals (Howell 1/2, both on 44 yard attempts, Launceford 2/2, 21 yards and 28 yards made).

=== Pittsburgh ===
	1	2	3	4	Total
Panthers	3	17	7	3	30
Eagles	7	0	7	6	20

BC lost its home opener in a renewed Big East matchup against Pitt, by a score of 30–20. After Pitt scored an opening drive field goal, BC answered quickly with a 51-yard run by Tyler Murphy, and a subsequent 1-yard touchdown run by Tyler Rouse. However, that was all the Eagles could muster in the first half, with Pitt dominating both sides of the ball, especially in the ground game. Pitt back James Conner ran for 213 yards and a touchdown on 36 carries, while Pitt's star wide receiver Tyler Boyd caught 72 yards and 2 touchdowns through the air. BC managed to get two scores late in the second half, but couldn't close the gap enough to make it interesting, as Pitt cruised to the victory. Tyler Murphy once again led the Eagles in rushing, gaining 92 yards and touchdown while throwing for 134 yards and a touchdown. Shakim Phillips caught 78 yards and a touchdown for Boston College.

=== USC ===
	1	2	3	4	Total
#9 Trojans	10	7	0	14	31
Eagles	0	20	7	10	37

Boston College completed a historic upset victory over the #9 ranked Trojans on an emotional night remembering the September 11 attacks and BC alum Welles Crowther, who lost his life while helping others to safety. The Eagles wore red bandana themed shoes, gloves and helmets, honoring Crowther's signature red bandana for which he was known. The game was on primetime television, drawing a full house and many notable attendants, including Heisman Trophy winners from both teams, USC's Marcus Allen and BC's Doug Flutie, as well as USC alum, Will Ferrell. The victory was the Eagles' first against USC in the five games played between the teams, and the Eagles' first victory against a top 10 team since beating Notre Dame in 2002.

The story of the night was the domination of the ground game, in both directions, by the Eagles. As a team, they gained 452 yards rushing while holding the Trojans to 20. Tyler Murphy was the hero, rushing for 191 yards on the night, featuring a 66-yard scoring run to seal the game late in the 4th quarter. Myles Willis and Jonathan Hilliman contributed with 89 yards gained each, with Hilliman scoring twice. Sherman Allston had a huge 54 yard scoring run in the second quarter to give the Eagles the 20–17 lead. Tyler Rouse also scored once on 29 yards gained. The Trojans succeeded in the air where they couldn't on the ground, with Cody Kessler throwing for 317 yards and four touchdowns, but it was not enough to overcome the Eagle's ability to control the ball and the time of possession. BC's defense also succeeded in pressuring Kessler, sacking him five times on the night.

After a failed onside kick attempt by the Trojans, the Eagles ran out the clock and emerged victorious, causing the crowd to rush the field and celebrate with the team.

1st quarter scoring: USC - George Farmer 8-yard pass from Cody Kessler (Andre Heidari kick), USC – Heidari 52-yard field goal,

2nd quarter scoring: BC – T. Rouse 4-yard run (J. Launceford kick failed), USC - Javorius Allen 51-yard pass from Kessler (Heidari kick), BC – J. Hilliman 3-yard run (Launceford kick), BC – S. Alston 54-yard run (Launceford kick)

3rd quarter scoring: BC - Hilliman 1-yard run (Launceford kick)

4th quarter scoring: BC - Launceford 25-yard field goal, USC - Nelson Agholor 10-yard pass from Kessler (Heidari kick), BC - T. Murphy 66-yard run (Launceford kick), USC - Darreus Rogers 14-yard pass from Kessler (Andre kick)

=== Maine ===
	1	2	3	4	Total
Black Bears	7	3	0	0	10
Eagles	10	9	14	7	40

BC gained its third victory of the year against FCS opponent and regional "rival" Maine in a 40–10 dominating affair. After a clumsy first half, which saw Maine score its first touchdown against a BC team since 1915, a blocked extra point, and an interception by Tyler Murphy, the Eagles recovered in the second half, dominating the line and scoring three touchdowns while allowing none to seal the victory. Murphy once again flourished on the ground, rushing for 99 yards and two scores, one coming off a career-long 71 yard touchdown run in the first quarter. He also threw for 130 yards and a score. True freshman Darius Wade took over for Murphy late in the game, testing the waters by throwing one six yard pass. The running backs saw large success, with freshman Marcus Outlaw running for 107 yards, Jonathan Hilliman scoring two touchdowns on 98 yards gained, Shermon Allston rushing for 57 yards, and Myles Willis gaining 48 yards, totaling 413 team yards gained. Josh Bordner also caught one touchdown and 64 yards on three catches to lead the receivers.

=== Colorado State ===
	1	2	3	4	Total
Rams	0	7	7	10	24
Eagles	0	14	7	0	21

Despite early success, BC was defeated 24–21 by Colorado State in a similar game to the loss vs. Pittsburgh. Both offenses sputtered in the start of the first half, with BC picking off Colorado State twice, once in the red zone, to keep the game scoreless. The Eagles running game scored twice in the second quarter with Jonathan Hilliman rushing for almost 100 yards and a score. The Rams got on the board late in the half to go into the locker room 14–7. After trading touchdowns to open the second half, the Rams picked off Tyler Murphy and had a chance to take the lead on the drive, but were stopped on a crucial 4th down conversion. However, BC went three and out following the 4th down stop, and Colorado scored on the subsequent drive, converting a touchdown on a 4th and 10 from the 12 yard line, taking the 24–21 lead. BC would take the ball with 1:02 left in the game but failed to move the ball down the field to try for a game-tying field goal.

=== @ NC State ===
	1	2	3	4	Total
Eagles	14	7	3	6	30
Wolfpack	14	0	0	0	14

The Eagles won their first conference game on the road at North Carolina State. Both teams offenses prevailed early as they traded touchdowns on five straight drives to open the game. The Eagles prolific running attack led by Tyler Murphy scored three times, with the usual suspects, Jonathan Hilliman, Murphy, and Sherman Alston, each scoring once on the ground. The Wolfpack answered twice in the first quarter but never managed another point in the game against a timely BC defense, who forced two turnovers in the second half. NC State's defense warmed up as well, only allowing a field goal until late in the fourth quarter. NC State opened up the second half by throwing an interception to Brian Mihalik, who returned the ball to the eight yard line, but managed to hold the Eagles to a field goal. An hour-long weather delay was implemented immediately following the interception due to lightning strikes in the area. Although not scoring, the Eagles ate up a huge chunk of the clock in the second half, keeping the ball out of the hands of the Wolfpack offense. With 5 minutes left in the game, Tyler Murphy sealed the win with a 27-yard score to put the Eagles up by 16. He finished the day with 135 yards and two scores rushing and 101 yards passing. Hilliman ran for 85 yards and a score, Alston for 53 yards and a score. Dan Crimmins and Josh Bordner both caught three receptions for 38 and 17 yards, respectively. Due to the kicking inconsistency of freshmen Alex Howell and Joey Launceford, another freshman kicker, Mike Knoll, made his collegiate debut, nailing a 28-yard attempt.

=== Clemson ===
	1	2	3	4	Total
#24 Tigers	0	10	0	7	17
Eagles	0	7	0	6	13

The Tigers managed to stave off a BC upset bid in a tight contest in Chestnut Hill. After both defenses held in the first quarter, the Tigers and Eagles traded touchdowns, with Clemson tacking on a field goal to take a 10–7 into the half. Another scoreless quarter out of the half, BC took the 13–10 lead early in the fourth but the Tigers responded on the following drive, taking 17–13 lead back. The Eagles had a chance to score on four straight pass attempts into the endzone late in the fourth, but did not manage to make a reception on any attempt, two of which were dropped by wide open receivers. Murphy finished the day with only 55 yards rushing, his first game of the season not scoring on the ground. He also threw for 108 yards and two touchdowns. Charlie Callinan caught 64 yards on three receptions.

=== @ Wake Forest ===
	1	2	3	4	Total
Eagles	10	7	0	6	23
Demon Deacons	0	0	3	14	17

The Eagles managed to hold off a late Wake Forest comeback after dominating early, to earn their 5th win of the season and 2nd in ACC play. After taking a 17–0 lead into the locker room, highlighted by two Jonathan Hilliman scores on the ground, one for 33 yards, the Eagles continued to dominate early in the second half, taking a 23–3 lead early in the fourth quarter off a touchdown catch by Shakim Phillips. It looked all but over but the Deacons mounted a surge, scoring twice in a 90 seconds to cut the lead to 23–17. But it too little too late as the Eagles defense held, with Justin Simmonds intercepting John Wolford's pass late in the fourth to secure the victory. It was the Eagles' third road victory of the season, and Tyler Murphy's second game without scoring a rushing touchdown; he rushed for 77 yards. Hilliman finished with 101 yards and two scores, and David Dudeck caught 58 yards on 3 receptions

=== @ Virginia Tech ===
	1	2	3	4	Total
Eagles	0	14	9	10	33
Hokies	7	3	0	21	31

The Eagles became bowl eligible for the second straight year with a 33–31 victory over the Hokies. Virginia Tech came out of the gate gunning, scoring a touchdown on a 95-yard drive in less than three minutes. Although BC's offense would not respond in the first quarter, their defense stiffened up, not allowing another touchdown during the half. The Eagles scored early in the second quarter on an 8-yard pass from Tyler Murphy to Charlie Callinan, his first touchdown catch of the season. VT would respond with a field goal, but allowed a 68-yard touchdown run by Myles Willis on the ensuing Eagles drive, to go behind 14–10. The Hokies would attempt a field goal to end the half, but it was blocked by Truman Gutapfel. The Eagles scored early in the second half on a 2-yard touchdown throw to Marcus Outlaw, Murphy's second touchdown throw of the game, matching his season high. The extra point was missed though, which continues to be a major problem for the Eagle's kicking team. Later in the quarter, BC punted the ball but Virginia Tech's Deon Newsome fumbled the return, and it was recovered by BC's Matt Milano. Although they were within 10 yard of the endzone, BC only managed to tack on a field goal to their lead, making it 23–10. Early in the fourth quarter, the Hokies faced a 4th and 9 on their own 34 yard line, but elected to fake a punt and converted the first down, eventually scoring a touchdown later in the drive to cut the lead to 6. After forcing an Eagles three-and-out, the Hokies continued to move the ball, and scored again, taking the 24–23 lead. BC managed to regain the lead on the next drive, nailing a 44-yard field goal to take the 26–24 lead. After forcing a VT three-and-out, BC held the ball on a 3rd and 10 from their own 43, when Tyler Murphy ripped off a 57-yard touchdown run to give them a 33–24 cushion with three minutes to go. This cushion proved pivotal as the Hokies managed to score a touchdown with 28 seconds remaining, and were forced to attempt an onside kick, which was recovered by the Eagles who subsequently ran out the clock for the victory. The win was the fourth road victory of the season for BC, who are perfect away from home so far. This was also the second victory in a row against the rival Hokies, who lead the all-time series 15–8. Tyler Murphy became the school's leading rusher by a QB, passing BC legend Doug Flutie, doing so in only 9 games as an Eagle. He finished the day with 122 yards rushing and a score, as well as 110 yards passing and two scores. Myles Willis ran for 79 yards and a score.

=== Louisville ===
	1	2	3	4	Total
Cardinals	3	14	7	14	38
Eagles	7	6	6	0	19

The Eagles home field woes continued as they lost to ACC newcomer Louisville in a 38–19 match. Despite battling closely through three quarters, the Cardinals sealed the win with three fourth quarter interceptions of Tyler Murphy, preventing the Eagles from catching up on the scoreboard. It was an off day for most of the Boston College Eagles, as they rushed for a combined 166 yards, well short of their 264 per game average. Murphy threw for 149 yards and score, with four total interceptions, but on a positive note, he passed 1,000 yards rushing on the season, continuing to lead the NCAA in rushing yards by a QB.

=== @ Florida State ===
	1	2	3	4	Total
Eagles	3	7	7	0	17
#1 Seminoles	7	10	0	3	20

Once again an Eagles upset bid fell short against the #1 ranked team (AP Poll) in the nation, Florida State Seminoles. A tight defensive battle matched by a back and forth offensive affair led to a 17–17 score late in the fourth quarter. FSU staved off the upset with a game-winning field goal in the dying seconds of the game, winning 20–17. Both teams missed a field goal during the game but BC especially missed their opportunities, eventually allowing Jameis Winston and the Seminoles to their 27th straight victory.

=== Syracuse ===
	1	2	3	4	Total
Orange	7	0	0	0	7
Eagles	7	7	7	7	28

The Eagles ended the regular season on a high note, defeating rival Syracuse on senior day by a score of 28–7, avenging the previous year's season-finale defeat at the Carrier Dome. The win matched the previous season's mark with seven, both seasons finishing 7–5 before entering bowl season.

Sophomore Myles Willis returned a kickoff for a touchdown on the game's opening kick to start the scoring for the Eagles. Syracuse managed to answer with a score in the first quarter but that was all they could muster in the game against a tight BC defense. The Eagles steadily tacked on another three scores throughout the game, taking advantage of two second-half interceptions on the Orange. Tyler Murphy set the ACC single-season rushing record for a QB with 1,079.

=== Penn State ===
	1	2	3	4	OT	Total
Penn State	7	0	7	10	7	31
Eagles	7	0	14	3	6	30

== Personnel ==
=== Coaching staff ===
Name	Position	Seasons at Boston College	Alma mater
Steve Addazio	Head Coach	1	Central Connecticut State (1982)
Ryan Day	Offensive Coordinator/quarterbacks	8	New Hampshire (2002)
Todd Fitch	Wide Receivers/passing game coordinator	1	Ohio Wesleyan (1986)
Justin Frye	Offensive Line	1	Indiana (2006)
Frank Leonard	Offensive Line	1	Central Connecticut State (1981)
Al Washington	Running backs	2	Boston College (2006)
Don Brown	Defensive coordinator/linebackers	1	Norwich (1977)
Ben Albert	Defensive line	2	UMass (1995)
Kevin Lempa	Defensive Backs	15	Southern Connecticut State (1974)
Sean McGowan	Special Teams Coordinator	1	Fordham (1998)

== 2015 NFL draft ==
2015	6	14	190	Ian Silberman	San Francisco 49ers	T
2015	6	32	208	Andy Gallik	Tennessee Titans	C
2015	7	20	237	Brian Mihalik	Philadelphia Eagles	DE
