= 2014 NC State Wolfpack football team =

American college football season

2014 NC State Wolfpack football

St. Petersburg Bowl champion

St. Petersburg Bowl, W 34–27 vs. UCF
- Conference: Atlantic Coast Conference
- Atlantic Division
- Record: 8–5 (3–5 ACC)
- Head coach: Dave Doeren (2nd season)
- Offensive coordinator: Matt Canada (2nd season)
- Offensive scheme: Pro-style
- Defensive coordinator: Dave Huxtable (2nd season)
- Base defense: 4–3
- Home stadium: Carter–Finley Stadium

2014 Atlantic Coast Conference football standings
	Conf.			Overall
Team	W		L	W		L
Atlantic Division
No. T–5 Florida State x$^	8	–	0	13	–	1
No. 15 Clemson	6	–	2	10	–	3
No. 24 Louisville	5	–	3	9	–	4
Boston College	4	–	4	7	–	6
NC State	3	–	5	8	–	5
Syracuse	1	–	7	3	–	9
Wake Forest	1	–	7	3	–	9
Coastal Division
No. 8 Georgia Tech x	6	–	2	11	–	3
Duke	5	–	3	9	–	4
North Carolina	4	–	4	6	–	7
Pittsburgh	4	–	4	6	–	7
Miami (FL)	3	–	5	6	–	7
Virginia Tech	3	–	5	7	–	6
Virginia	3	–	5	5	–	7
Championship: Florida State 37, Georgia Tech 35
^ – College Football Playoff participant; $ – Conference champion; x – Division champion/co-champions; Rankings from AP Poll

The 2014 NC State Wolfpack football team represented North Carolina State University in the Atlantic Division of the Atlantic Coast Conference during the 2014 NCAA Division I FBS football season. They played their home games at Carter–Finley Stadium in Raleigh, North Carolina. It was the team's second season under head coach Dave Doeren. They finished the season 8–5, 3–5 in ACC play to finish in fifth place in the Atlantic Division. They were invited to the St. Petersburg Bowl, where they defeated UCF.

== Schedule ==
Date	Time	Opponent	Site	TV	Result	Attendance
August 30	12:30 pm	Georgia Southern*	Carter–Finley Stadium; Raleigh, NC	ACCN	W 24–23	54,273
September 6	6:00 pm	Old Dominion*	Carter–Finley Stadium; Raleigh, NC	ESPN3	W 46–34	55,390
September 13	3:30 pm	at South Florida*	Raymond James Stadium; Tampa, FL	CBSSN	W 49–17	27,269
September 20	6:00 pm	Presbyterian*	Carter–Finley Stadium; Raleigh, NC	ESPN3	W 42–0	54,408
September 27	3:30 pm	No. 1 Florida State	Carter–Finley Stadium; Raleigh, NC	ABC/ESPN2	L 41–56	57,583
October 4	3:30 pm	at Clemson	Memorial Stadium, Clemson; Clemson, SC (Textile Bowl)	ESPNU	L 0–41	78,459
October 11	3:30 pm	Boston College	Carter–Finley Stadium; Raleigh, NC	ACCRSN	L 14–30	49,125
October 18	3:30 pm	at Louisville	Papa John's Cardinal Stadium; Louisville, KY	ACCRSN	L 12–30	50,227
November 1	3:00 pm	at Syracuse	Carrier Dome; Syracuse, NY	ACCRSN	W 24–17	40,787
November 8	12:30 pm	No. 24 Georgia Tech^{†}	Carter–Finley Stadium; Raleigh, NC	ACCN	L 23–56	54,653
November 15	3:00 pm	Wake Forest	Carter–Finley Stadium; Raleigh, NC (rivalry)	ACCRSN	W 42–13	55,353
November 29	12:30 pm	at North Carolina	Kenan Stadium; Chapel Hill, NC (rivalry)	ACCN	W 35–7	53,000
December 26	8:00 pm	vs. UCF*	Tropicana Field; St. Petersburg, FL (St. Petersburg Bowl)	ESPN	W 34–27	26,675
*Non-conference game; ^{†}Homecoming; Rankings from AP Poll released prior to the game; All times are in Eastern time

== Coaching staff ==
NC State Wolfpack coaches

Head coach

- Dave Doeren

Assistant coaches

- Matt Canada – Offensive coordinator and Quarterbacks coach
- Dave Huxtable – Defensive coordinator and Linebackers coach
- Eddie Faulkner – Special teams coordinator/tight ends coach/fullbacks coach
- George Barlow – Cornerbacks coach
- Desmond Kitchings– Running backs coach/recruiting coordinator
- Frisman Jackson – Wide receivers coach
- Ryan Nielsen – Defensive line coach/run-game coordinator for defense
- Mike Uremovich – Offensive line coach
- Clayton White – Safeties coach/co-special teams coordinator
- Jason veltkamp – Strength and conditioning coach
- Ty Howle – Graduate assistant

== Roster ==
2014 NC State Wolfpack football team roster
Quarterbacks: 12 Jacoby Brissett – (redshirt) Junior; Jordan dawson – (redshirt) Freshman; 11 Garrett Leatham – (redshirt) Senior; 5 Josh Taylor – Junior; Running Backs: 21 Matt Dayes – Sophomore; 25 Reggie Gallaspy – Freshman; 34 Ben Grazen – Sophomore; 27 Dakwa Nichols – (redshirt) Sophomore; 44 Devin O'Connor – (redshirt) Junior; 10 Shadrach Thornton – Junior; 26 Tony Creecy – Senior; Wide Receivers: 15 Johnathan Alston – Junior; 13 Bra'Lon Cherry – Sophomore; 30 Gavin Locklear – (redshirt) Sophomore; 88 Stephen Louis – Freshman; 19 Maurice Morgan – (redshirt) Junior; 80 Elliott Davis – (redshirt) Freshman; 36 Jacob Davis – Junior; 82 Bo Hines – Freshman; 32 Stephen Morrison – Freshman; 3 Jumichael Ramos – Junior; 87 Maurice Trowell – Freshman; 80 Bryan Underwood – Senior; 84 Marquez Valdes-Scantling – Sophomore; Tight end: 89 Benson Browne – Senior; 48 Cole Cook – Freshman; 86 David J. Grinnage – (redshirt) Junior; 28 Jaylen Samuels – Sophomore; 85 Micah Till – (redshirt) Freshman; 83 Lucas Wilson – Freshman	Offensive line: 50 Tony Adams – Freshman; 71 Alex Barr – (redshirt) Senior; 52 Cole Blankenship – (redshirt) Sophomore; 57 Peter Daniel – (redshirt) Sophomore; 53 Tyler Jones – (redshirt) Freshman; 56 Bryce Kennedy – (redshirt) Junior; 68 Zak Kuder – (redshirt) Freshman; T. J. McCoy – Freshman; 70 Terronne Prescod – (redshirt) Freshman; 67 Evan Pritt – (redshirt) Sophomore; 64 Tylar Reagan – (redshirt) Sophomore; 66 Will Richardson – (redshirt) Freshman; 60 Quinton Schooley – Senior; 76 Eric Shute – (redshirt) Freshman; 54 Joe Thuney – Senior; 59 John Tu'uta – (redshirt) Junior; Defensive line: 54 Davion Allred – (redshirt) Sophomore; 92 Hampton Billips – (redshirt) Freshman; 38 Garrett Bradbury – (redshirt) Freshman; 43 Coult Culler – (redshirt) Freshman; 96 Kenton Gibbs – (redshirt) Freshman; 98 B. J. Hill – Freshman; 87 Pharoah McKever – (redshirt) Sophomore; 97 Deshawn Middleton – (redshirt) Freshman; 94 Monty Nelson – Junior; 90 Mike Rose – (redshirt) Senior; Darian roseboro – Freshman; 35 Kentavius Street – Sophomore; Linebacker: 49 Bradley Chubb – Sophomore; 4 Jerod Fernandez – (redshirt) Sophomore; Ford howell – (redshirt) Sophomore; 33 Ty Linton – (redshirt) Freshman; 58 Airius Moore – Sophomore; Riley nicholson – Freshman; 45 Artemis Robinson – (redshirt) Sophomore; 46 Ernie Robinson – (redshirt) Sophomore; 42 M. J. Salahuddin – (redshirt) Junior; 48 Bryan Smith – (redshirt) Sophomore; James smith-williams – Freshman; 36 Max Stoffer – (redshirt) Freshman	Defensive back: 26 Trace Batten – (redshirt) Freshman; 24 Shawn Boone – Sophomore; 41 Cole Boroughs – (redshirt) Junior; 6 Tim Buckley – (redshirt) Senior; 11 Justin Burris – Senior; 25 Niles Clark – (redshirt) Junior; 21 Elliot Davis – (redshirt) Freshman; 20 Hakim Jones – (redshirt) Senior; 2 Josh Jones – (redshirt) Sophomore; 12 Nicholas Lacy – (redshirt) Sophomore; 27 Kalen McCain – (redshirt) Freshman; 14 Malcolm Means – (redshirt) Sophomore; 7 Sean Paul – (redshirt) Sophomore; Freddie Phillips, Jr. – Freshman; 31 Germaine Pratt – Sophomore; 37 Josh Sessoms – (redshirt) Junior; 30 Mike Stevens – Sophomore; 29 Jack Tocho – Junior; 33 Charlie Twitty – (redshirt) Junior; 22 Troy Vincent, Jr. – Sophomore (5'9, 199); 28 Robert Wilcox – (redshirt) Freshman; 34 Dexter Wright – (redshirt) Freshman; 8 Dravious Wright – Junior; Special teams: Niklas Sade – Senior (P); 62 R. C. Brunstetter – (redshirt) Freshman (LS); A. J. Cole III – Freshman (P); 52 Ben Garnett – (redshirt) Junior (LS); 37 Jackson Maples – (redshirt) Freshman (PK); Duncan musselwhite – Freshman (LS); 47 William Stephenson – (redshirt) Junior (P)

== Game summaries ==
=== Georgia Southern ===
	1	2	3	4	Total
Eagles	7	10	3	3	23
Wolfpack	3	0	7	14	24

=== Old Dominion ===
	1	2	3	4	Total
Monarchs	14	7	7	6	34
Wolfpack	10	8	14	14	46

=== @ South Florida ===
	1	2	3	4	Total
Wolfpack	14	21	14	0	49
Bulls	7	0	10	0	17

=== Presbyterian ===
	1	2	3	4	Total
Blue Hose	0	0	0	0	0
Wolfpack	7	14	14	7	42

=== Florida State ===
	1	2	3	4	Total
#1 Seminoles	7	14	21	14	56
Wolfpack	24	0	14	3	41

=== @ Clemson ===
	1	2	3	4	Total
Wolfpack	0	0	0	0	0
Tigers	21	10	10	0	41

=== Boston College ===
	1	2	3	4	Total
Eagles	14	7	3	6	30
Wolfpack	14	0	0	0	14

=== @ Louisville ===
	1	2	3	4	Total
Wolfpack	6	0	3	9	18
Cardinals	7	10	3	10	30

=== @ Syracuse ===
	1	2	3	4	Total
Wolfpack	3	6	8	7	24
Orange	0	7	7	3	17

=== Georgia Tech ===
	1	2	3	4	Total
Yellow Jackets	14	21	14	7	56
Wolfpack	13	3	0	7	23

=== Wake Forest ===
	1	2	3	4	Total
Demon Deacons	3	0	3	7	13
Wolfpack	7	14	21	0	42

=== @ North Carolina ===
	1	2	3	4	Total
Wolfpack	7	14	7	7	35
Tar Heels	0	0	0	7	7
