= Joe Adam =

American football coach

Current position
- Title: Head coach
- Team: Saint Anselm
- Conference: NE-10
- Record: 33–57

Biographical details
- Born: Chicago, Illinois, U.S.
- Education: Grand Valley State University (2005)

Coaching career (HC unless noted)
- 1995–1996: Niles West HS (IL) (DL)
- 1997–2002: Harper (IL) (line)
- 2003–2005: Grand Valley State (SA)
- 2006: Western Michigan (GA)
- 2007: Elmhurst (QB/RB)
- 2008–2012: Elmhurst (AHC/DC/DB)
- 2013: Elmhurst
- 2014: Syracuse (OL)
- 2015: Syracuse (IOL)
- 2016–present: Saint Anselm

Head coaching record
- Overall: 37–63

Joe Adam is an American college football coach. He is the head football coach for Saint Anselm College, a position he has held since 2016. Adam served as the head football coach at Elmhurst College in Elmhurst, Illinois in 2013 and as an assistant coach at Syracuse University from 2014 to 2015.

== Head coaching record ==
Year	Team	Overall	Conference	Standing	Bowl/playoffs
Elmhurst Bluejays (College Conference of Illinois and Wisconsin) (2013)
2013	Elmhurst	4–6	3–4	T–4th	
Elmhurst:		4–6	3–4		
Saint Anselm Hawks (Northeast-10 Conference) (2016–present)
2016	Saint Anselm	2–9	2–7	T–8th	
2017	Saint Anselm	1–9	1–8	10th	
2018	Saint Anselm	1–8	1–8	T–9th	
2019	Saint Anselm	4–7	4–4	6th	
2020–21	No team—COVID-19				
2021	Saint Anselm	3–6	3–5	T–5th	
2022	Saint Anselm	6–4	3–4	5th	
2023	Saint Anselm	6–4	5–2	T–2nd	
2024	Saint Anselm	5–5	5–3	T–3rd	
2025	Saint Anselm	5–5	4–3	T–4th	
Saint Anselm:		33–57	28–44		
Total:		37–63			
