= Quayshawn Nealy =

American gridiron football player (born 1991)

Profile
- Position: Linebacker

Personal information
- Born: August 5, 1991 (age 35); Winter Haven, Florida, U.S.
- Listed height: 6 ft 0 in (1.83 m)
- Listed weight: 237 lb (108 kg)

Career information
- High school: Lakeland (Lakeland, Florida)
- College: Georgia Tech (2010–2014)
- NFL draft: 2015: undrafted

Career history
- Seattle Seahawks (2015)*; Tampa Bay Buccaneers (2015)*; Arizona Cardinals (2016)*; Seattle Seahawks (2016)*; Toronto Argonauts (2017)*
- * Offseason or practice squad member only

Awards and highlights
- Second-team All-ACC (2014)
- Stats at Pro Football Reference

Quayshawn Tyree Nealy (born August 5, 1991) is an American former football linebacker. He was a member of the Seattle Seahawks, Tampa Bay Buccaneers, Arizona Cardinals, and Toronto Argonauts. He played college football at Georgia Tech.

== Professional career ==
=== Seattle Seahawks ===
On May 2, 2015, Nealy was signed by the Seattle Seahawks as an undrafted free agent. On August 31, 2015, he was waived.

=== Tampa Bay Buccaneers ===
Nealy was signed with the Tampa Bay Buccaneers on November 4, 2015. On November 17, 2015, he was released.

=== Arizona Cardinals ===
Nealy was signed to the Arizona Cardinals' practice squad on January 12, 2016. On July 27, 2016, he was released.

=== Seattle Seahawks (II) ===
On August 15, 2016, Nealy was signed again by the Seahawks. On August 30, 2016, he was waived by the Seahawks.

=== Toronto Argonauts ===
On February 2, 2017, Nealy and the Toronto Argonauts of the Canadian Football League (CFL) agreed to a contract. Nealy was released by the Argonauts on May 28, 2017.
