= DeAndre Smelter =

American football player (born 1991)

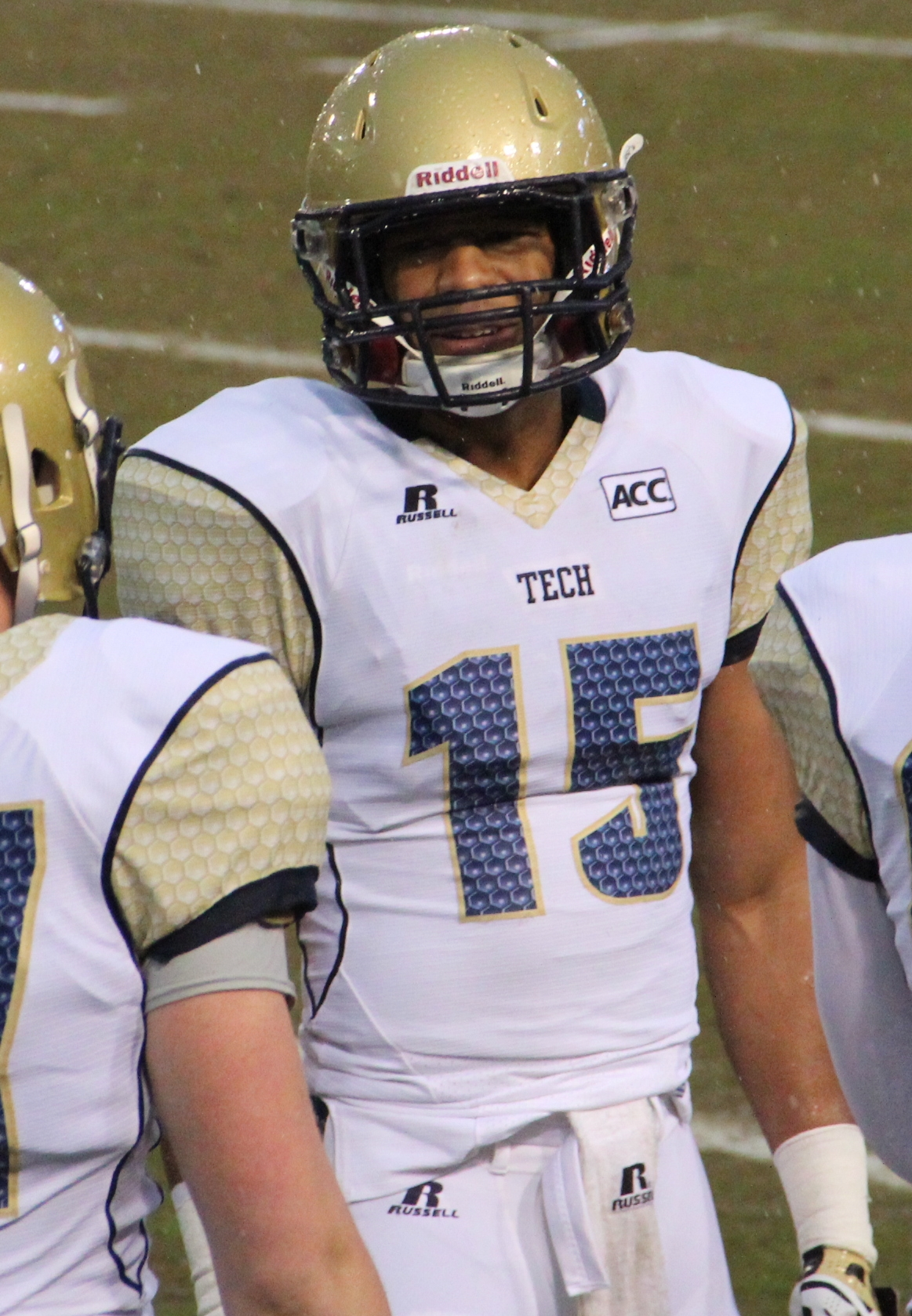
- Smelter with the Georgia Tech Yellow Jackets in 2014

Georgia Tech Yellow Jackets
- Title: Graduate assistant

Personal information
- Born: December 3, 1991 (age 34); Macon, Georgia, U.S.
- Listed height: 6 ft 2 in (1.88 m)
- Listed weight: 227 lb (103 kg)

Career information
- High school: Tattnall Square Academy (Macon)
- College: Georgia Tech
- NFL draft: 2015: 4th round, 132nd overall pick

Career history

Playing
- San Francisco 49ers (2015–2017); Indianapolis Colts (2018)*; Jacksonville Jaguars (2018)*
- * Offseason or practice squad member only

Coaching
- Georgia Tech (2023–present) Graduate assistant

Career NFL statistics
- Receptions: 1
- Receiving yards: 23
- Stats at Pro Football Reference

DeAndre Tremaine Smelter (born December 3, 1991) is an American former professional football player who was a wide receiver in the National Football League (NFL). He played college football for the Georgia Tech Yellow Jackets and was drafted by the San Francisco 49ers in the fourth round of the 2015 NFL draft. Smelter was also a member of the Indianapolis Colts and Jacksonville Jaguars.

== College career ==
Smelter originally was drafted by the Minnesota Twins of Major League Baseball in 2010, but turned it down to play college baseball at Georgia Tech. In 2011, he played collegiate summer baseball with the Falmouth Commodores of the Cape Cod Baseball League. After playing three seasons of baseball from 2011 to 2013, primarily as a relief pitcher, shoulder problems caused him to turn to football. Smelter went on to play two seasons as a starting wide receiver for the Georgia Tech Yellow Jackets edging out Darren Waller on the depth chart. However, on November 29, 2014, in the traditional year ending rivalry game against the University of Georgia, Smelter tore his ACL.

== Professional career ==
=== San Francisco 49ers ===
Smelter was selected by the San Francisco 49ers in the fourth round (132nd overall) of the 2015 NFL draft.

On September 3, 2016, Smelter was released by the 49ers. He was re-signed to the practice squad on October 18. Smelter was promoted to the active roster on December 20. In the regular season finale against the Seattle Seahawks, he caught his first and only career reception from Colin Kaepernick, which went for 23 yards and a first down.

On September 2, 2017, Smelter was waived by the 49ers, but was signed to the practice squad the next day.

=== Indianapolis Colts ===
On January 17, 2018, Smelter signed a reserve/future contract with the Indianapolis Colts. He was waived on May 11.

=== Jacksonville Jaguars ===
On June 15, 2018, Smelter signed with the Jacksonville Jaguars. He was waived on September 1.

== Coaching career ==
In 2023, Smelter joined his alma mater, Georgia Tech, as a graduate assistant.
