= Marquise Williams =

American gridiron football player (born 1992)

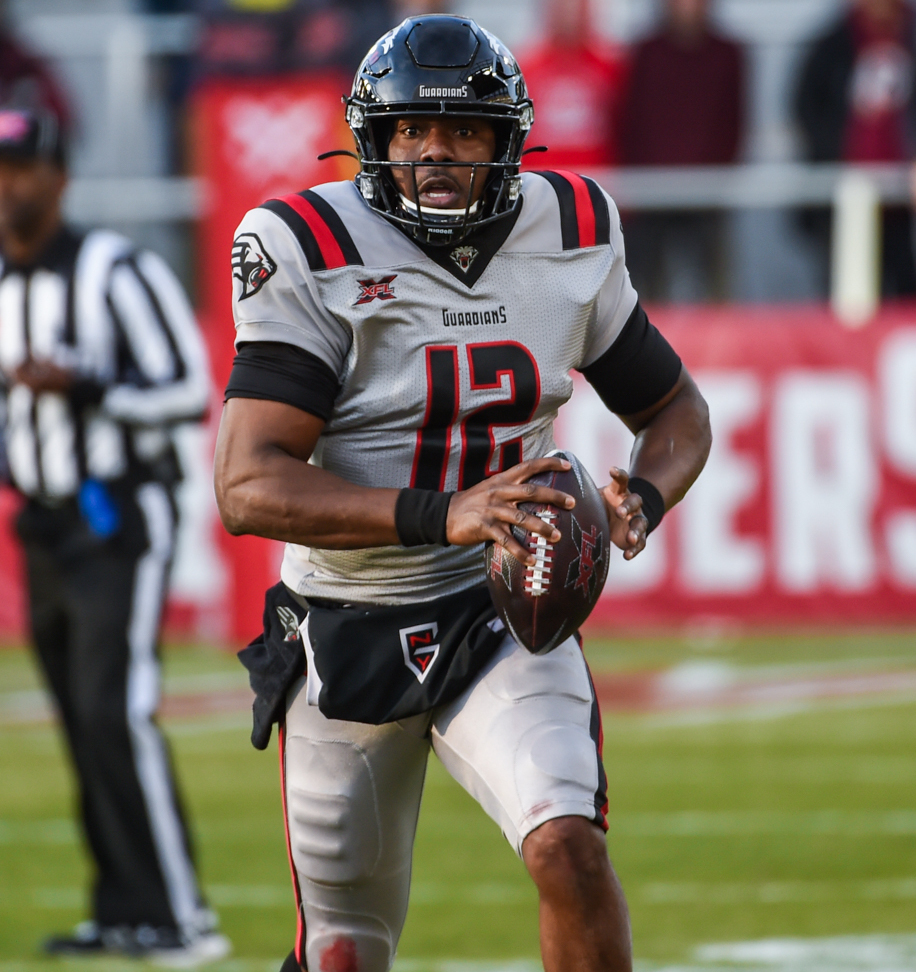
- Williams with the New York Guardians in 2020

No. 4, 9, 12
- Position: Quarterback

Personal information
- Born: October 5, 1992 (age 34); Shelby, North Carolina, U.S.
- Listed height: 6 ft 2 in (1.88 m)
- Listed weight: 233 lb (106 kg)

Career information
- High school: Mallard Creek (Charlotte, North Carolina)
- College: North Carolina (2011–2015)
- NFL draft: 2016: undrafted

Career history
- Green Bay Packers (2016)*; Saskatchewan Roughriders (2017–2018); Atlanta Legends (2019)*; San Antonio Commanders (2019); New York Guardians (2020)
- * Offseason or practice squad member only

Awards and highlights
- 2× Second-team All-ACC (2014, 2015)
- Stats at Pro Football Reference
- Stats at CFL.ca

Marquise Javon Williams (born October 5, 1992) is an American former professional football quarterback. He played college football for the North Carolina Tar Heels, earning two consecutive second-team All-ACC selections between 2014 and 2015. Williams began his professional career in 2017 with the Saskatchewan Roughriders of the Canadian Football League (CFL), where he spent two seasons as a backup. He later played one season with the San Antonio Commanders of the Alliance of American Football (AAF) and his final with the New York Guardians of the XFL.

== Early life ==
Williams attended Mallard Creek High School in Charlotte, North Carolina. As a senior, he threw for 3,034 yards with 45 touchdowns and rushed for 1,147 yards and 19 touchdowns. Williams was a four-star recruit by Rivals.com and was ranked as the ninth best dual-threat quarterback in his class.

College recruiting
Name	Hometown	School	Height	Weight	40^{‡}	Commit date
Marquise Williams; QB	Charlotte, NC	Mallard Creek HS	6 ft 3 in (1.91 m)	217 lb (98 kg)	4.75	Jun 7, 2010
Marquise Williams; QB	Recruit ratings: Scout: Rivals: (79)					
Overall recruit ranking: Scout: 16 (QB), 263 (National) Rivals: 9 (QB), 247 (National), 11 (NC)
‡ Refers to 40-yard dash; Note: In many cases, Scout, Rivals, 247Sports, On3, and ESPN may conflict in their listings of height, weight and 40 time.; In these cases, the average was taken. ESPN grades are on a 100-point scale.; Sources: "North Carolina Commit List for 2011". Rivals.; "Scout.com Football Recruiting: North Carolina". Scout.; "RecruitTracker 2011: North Carolina". ESPN.; "Scout.com Team Recruiting Rankings". Scout.; "2011 Team Ranking". Rivals.com.

== College career ==
After redshirting in 2011, Williams appeared in nine games as Bryn Renner's backup as a redshirt freshman in 2012. He passed for 127 yards and a touchdown and also rushed for 186 yards with three touchdowns. Williams entered his sophomore season in 2013 as Renner's backup. After Renner suffered an injury that caused him to miss the rest of the season, Williams became the starter. Against Old Dominion, he set the school record for total yards in a game with 469. In total he appeared in 12 games with six starts, completing 126 of 217 passes for 1,698 yards, 15 touchdowns and six interceptions. He also led the team in rushing yards with 536, becoming the first quarterback to lead North Carolina in rushing since Gayle Bomar in 1968. Williams entered his junior season in 2014 as the starter. He passed for 3,068 yards with 21 passing touchdowns and added 13 rushing touchdowns.

Williams returned as a starter and team captain his senior year in 2015, leading the Tar Heels to the ACC Coastal Division title and the ACC Championship Game. Over the course of the season, Williams passed for 3,072 yards and 24 passing touchdowns while recording 13 rushing touchdowns. Against Duke University, Williams had a historic performance. He threw for 494 passing yards, which was a school record for passing yards in a game, and four touchdowns, and rushed for another touchdown. Williams' single-game passing yards record was eclipsed in 2020 by Sam Howell who threw for 550 yards in a win against Wake Forest.

=== College statistics ===
Legend
**Bold**	Career high

Season	Team	Passing								Rushing				Receiving			
Season	Team	Cmp	Att	Pct	Yds	Y/A	TD	Int	Rtg	Att	Yds	Avg	TD	Rec	Yds	Avg	TD
2012	North Carolina	10	17	58.8	127	7.5	1	0	141.0	29	186	**6.4**	3	0	0	0.0	0
2013	North Carolina	126	217	58.1	1,698	7.8	15	6	141.1	111	536	4.8	6	**2**	**52**	26.0	**1**
2014	North Carolina	**270**	**428**	**63.1**	3,068	7.2	21	9	135.3	**193**	788	4.1	**13**	**2**	17	8.5	**1**
2015	North Carolina	218	356	61.2	**3,072**	**8.6**	**24**	**10**	**150.3**	158	**948**	6.0	**13**	1	37	**37.0**	**1**
Career		624	1,018	61.3	7,965	7.8	61	25	141.8	491	2,458	5.0	35	5	106	21.2	3

== Professional career ==
Pre-draft measurables
Height	Weight	Arm length	Hand span	40-yard dash	10-yard split	20-yard split	20-yard shuttle	Three-cone drill	Vertical jump	Broad jump
6 ft 1 7/8 in (1.88 m)	218 lb (99 kg)	34 in (0.86 m)	10 in (0.25 m)	4.81 s	1.71 s	2.75 s	4.37 s	7.00 s	32.5 in (0.83 m)	9 ft 3 in (2.82 m)
All values are from Pro Day

Williams attended rookie minicamp with the Minnesota Vikings on a tryout basis in May 2016.

=== Green Bay Packers ===
Williams was signed by the Green Bay Packers on May 26, 2016. On September 3, 2016, he was released by the Packers during final team cuts.

=== Saskatchewan Roughriders ===
In May 2017, Williams signed as a rookie free agent with the Saskatchewan Roughriders of the Canadian Football League (CFL). Throughout the two-game preseason, Williams completed 10 passes out of 12 attempts, for 115 yards, and one interception. Williams made the Roughriders roster as the third quarterback on June 17, beating out Vince Young who, like Williams, had also played for the Green Bay Packers during a preseason. Williams also beat out Bryan Bennett for the job.

In May 2018, Williams took reps against the Edmonton Eskimos in the opening preseason game of the 2018 CFL season, completing 3 of his 7 pass attempts for 32 yards and an interception. On May 28, 2018, Williams and three other players were released by the Roughriders the day after their 35–12 preseason loss to the Eskimos.

=== San Antonio Commanders ===
In the inaugural AAF quarterback draft, the San Antonio Commanders used their second-round pick on Williams, who had initially been allocated to the Atlanta Legends. He was primarily used as a change-of-pace backup, earning a handful of plays but filling in well whenever starter Logan Woodside was benched or injured. Williams completed over 70% of his passing attempts, including a touchdown and a two-point conversion, and rushed for nearly six yards per carry. The league ceased operations in April 2019.

=== New York Guardians ===
In October 2019, Williams was selected by the New York Guardians in the tenth round of the 2020 XFL draft. Williams was active for all 5 games in the COVID-19 shortened season, seeing snaps in 3 of them; he spent most of the season as the team's third-string quarterback behind Matt McGloin and Luis Perez. Williams' completed 23 out of 48 passes in relief work, as well as being used as a situational rusher with 5 carries for 29 yards and a touchdown. Another of Williams' runs gained 16 yards on a fake punt, converting the first down in opponent territory. He had his contract terminated when the league suspended operations on April 10, 2020.

=== Professional statistics ===
Year	Team	League	Games		Passing								Rushing			
Year	Team	League	GP	GS	Cmp	Att	Pct	Yds	Avg	TD	Int	Rtg	Att	Yds	Avg	TD
2017	SSK	CFL	8	0	0	0	0.0	0	0.0	0	0	0.0	0	0	0.0	0
2019	SAN	AAF	8	0	25	34	73.5	203	6.0	1	0	98.0	21	120	5.7	0
2020	NYG	XFL	3	0	23	48	47.9	145	3.0	0	0	68.2	5	29	5.8	1

== Personal life ==
In February 2021, Marquise started his career as a professional Twitch streamer. Marquise streams himself on the football based game, Madden NFL 21, in front of his viewers. His Twitch name is mjwilliams.
