= 2013 Pittsburgh Panthers football team =

American college football season

2013 Pittsburgh Panthers football

Little Caesars Pizza Bowl champion

Little Caesars Pizza Bowl, W 30–27 vs. Bowling Green
- Conference: Atlantic Coast Conference
- Coastal Division
- Record: 7–6 (3–5 ACC)
- Head coach: Paul Chryst (2nd season)
- Offensive coordinator: Joe Rudolph (2nd season)
- Offensive scheme: Pro-style
- Defensive coordinator: Matt House (1st season)
- Base defense: 4–3
- Home stadium: Heinz Field

2013 Atlantic Coast Conference football standings
	Conf.			Overall
Team	W		L	W		L
Atlantic Division
No. 1 Florida State x$#	8	–	0	14	–	0
No. 8 Clemson %	7	–	1	11	–	2
Boston College	4	–	4	7	–	6
Syracuse	4	–	4	7	–	6
Maryland	3	–	5	7	–	6
Wake Forest	2	–	6	4	–	8
NC State	0	–	8	3	–	9
Coastal Division
No. 23 Duke x	6	–	2	10	–	4
Miami (FL)	5	–	3	9	–	4
Virginia Tech	5	–	3	8	–	5
Georgia Tech	5	–	3	7	–	6
North Carolina	4	–	4	7	–	6
Pittsburgh	3	–	5	7	–	6
Virginia	0	–	8	2	–	10
Championship: Florida State 45, Duke 7
# – BCS National Champion; $ – BCS representative as conference champion; % – BCS at-large representative; x – Division champion/co-champions; Rankings from AP Poll

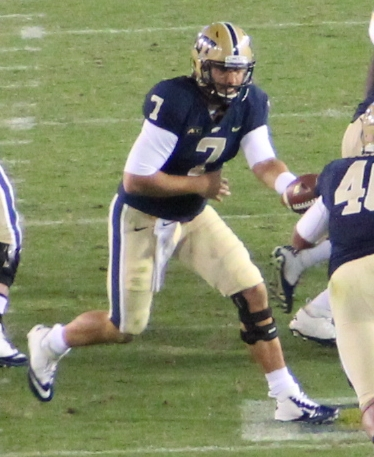
Pitt starting quarterback Tom Savage handing off during the Georgia Tech game

The 2013 Pittsburgh Panthers football team represented the University of Pittsburgh in the 2013 NCAA Division I FBS football season. The Panthers were led by head coach Paul Chryst and played their home games at Heinz Field. They were a member of the Coastal Division of the Atlantic Coast Conference. This was Pitt's first season as a member of the ACC after being a member of the Big East since 1991. They finished the season 7–6, 3–5 in ACC play to finish in sixth place in the Coastal Division. Pitt was invited to the Little Caesars Pizza Bowl, beating Bowling Green on a field goal by Chris Blewitt in the final two minutes. Running back, James Conner, rushed for 229 yards and broke a Pittsburgh bowl record previously held by Tony Dorsett.

== Schedule ==
Date	Time	Opponent	Site	TV	Result	Attendance
September 2	8:00 p.m.	No. 11 Florida State	Heinz Field; Pittsburgh, PA	ESPN	L 13–41	65,500
September 14	12:30 p.m.	New Mexico*	Heinz Field; Pittsburgh, PA	ACCN	W 49–27	40,249
September 21	12:30 p.m.	at Duke	Wallace Wade Stadium; Durham, NC	ACCN	W 58–55	22,714
September 28	12:30 p.m.	Virginia^{†}	Heinz Field; Pittsburgh, PA	ACCRSN	W 14–3	48,425
October 12	12:00 p.m.	at No. 24 Virginia Tech	Lane Stadium; Blacksburg, VA	ESPNU	L 9–19	64,954
October 19	7:00 p.m.	Old Dominion*	Heinz Field; Pittsburgh, PA	ACCRSN	W 35–24	38,462
October 26	1:00 p.m.	at Navy*	Navy–Marine Corps Memorial Stadium; Annapolis, MD	CBSSN	L 21–24	37,094
November 2	7:00 p.m.	at Georgia Tech	Bobby Dodd Stadium; Atlanta, GA	ESPNU	L 10–21	52,312
November 9	8:00 p.m.	No. 24 Notre Dame*	Heinz Field; Pittsburgh, PA (rivalry)	ABC	W 28–21	65,500
November 16	12:30 p.m.	North Carolina	Heinz Field; Pittsburgh, PA	ACCN	L 27–34	50,049
November 23	12:30 p.m.	at Syracuse	Carrier Dome; Syracuse, NY (rivalry)	ACCN	W 17–16	35,317
November 29	3:30 p.m.	Miami (FL)	Heinz Field; Pittsburgh, PA	ABC	L 31–41	40,003
December 26	6:00 p.m.	vs. Bowling Green*	Ford Field; Detroit, MI (Little Caesars Pizza Bowl)	ESPN	W 30–27	26,259
*Non-conference game; ^{†}Homecoming; Rankings from AP Poll released prior to the game; All times are in Eastern time

== Personnel ==
=== Coaching staff ===
2013 Pittsburgh Panthers football staff
Coaching staff: Paul Chryst – Head coach; Joe Rudolph – Assistant head coach/offensive coordinator/tight ends; Matt House – Defensive coordinator/secondary; Brooks Bollinger – Quarterbacks; Inoke Breckterfield – Defensive line; Bobby Engram – Wide receivers; Chris Haering – Linebackers; John Palermo – Linebackers/defensive Ends; Jim Hueber – Offensive line; Desmond Robinson – Running backs	Support staff: Chris LaSala – Assistant Athletic Director/football operations; Bob Junko – Director of Football Relations and Program Enhancement; Hank Poteat – Defensive graduate assistant; Nate Tice – Offensive graduate assistant; Mickey Turner – Offensive graduate assistant; Spencer Whipple – Defensive graduate assistant	Strength and conditioning staff: Todd Rice – Strength and conditioning coach; Ross Kolodziej – Assistant strength and conditioning coach; Shaun Snee – Strength and conditioning Graduate Assistant

=== Roster ===
2013 Pittsburgh Panthers football roster
Quarterback: 7 – Tom Savage – (redshirt) senior (6'5, 230); 11 – Trey Anderson – junior (6'0, 195); 16 – Chad Voytik – (redshirt) freshman (6'1, 215); Running back: 29 – Rachid Ibrahim – freshman (6'1, 195); 32 – Malcolm Crockett – (redshirt) sophomore (5'10, 205); 34 – Isaac Bennett – junior (5'11, 210); 40 – James Conner – freshman (6'2, 235); 49 – Desmond Brown – (redshirt) senior (5'9, 200); Wide receiver: 12 – Dontez Ford – (redshirt) freshman (6'2, 210); 14 – Ronald Jones – junior (5'8, 170); 15 – Devin Street – (redshirt) senior (6'4, 195); 17 – Chris Wuestner – (redshirt) freshman (6'2, 210); 20 – Brandon Ifill – (redshirt) junior (6'1, 200); 23 – Tyler Boyd – freshman (6'2, 200); 36 – Brett Zuck – (redshirt) junior (6'1, 195); 80 – Zach Challingsworth – (redshirt) freshman (6'2, 195); 84 – Ed Tinker – (redshirt) senior (6'2, 195); 85 – Jester Weah – freshman (6'3, 210); 87 – Reggie Green – freshman (6'2, 225); 88 – Kevin Weatherspoon – (redshirt) junior (5'10, 175); Placekicker: 12 – Chris Blewitt – freshman (5'9, 195); 48 – Drake Greer – (redshirt) junior (6'4, 205); Punter: 90 – Ryan Winslow – freshman (6'5, 205); 92 – Matt Yoklic – (redshirt) senior (6'4, 220)	Tight end: 45 – Devon Edwards – freshman (6'4, 275); 81 – Tony Harper – freshman (6'4, 225); 82 – Manasseh Garner – (redshirt) junior (6'2, 220); 83 – Scott Orndoff – freshman (6'5, 255); 86 – J.P. Holtz – sophomore (6'4, 250); Fullback: 31 – Jaymar Parrish – freshman (6'2, 230); 35 – Trent Neavin – freshman (6'1, 255); 41 – Anthony Rippole – (redshirt) freshman (5'10, 230); 43 – Mark Giubilato – (redshirt) junior (6'2, 235); 44 – Colton Lively – freshman (6'0, 235); 46 – Adam Lazenga – (redshirt) junior (6'0, 245); Offensive lineman: 53 – Dorian Johnson – freshman (6'5, 315); 57 – Artie Rowell – (redshirt) sophomore (6'2, 310); 60 – Aaron Reeese – freshman (6'5, 310); 62 – John Guy – (redshirt) freshman (6'7, 310); 63 – Alex Officer – freshman (6'4, 340); 64 – Shane Johnson – (redshirt) junior (6'5, 330); 68 – T. J. Clemmings – (redshirt) junior (6'6, 315); 69 – Adam Bisnowaty – (redshirt) freshman (6'6, 305); 70 – Juantez Hollins – (redshirt) senior (6'5, 330); 71 – Gabe Roberts – (redshirt) freshman (6'5, 300); 72 – Carson Baker – freshman (6'5, 320); 74 – Matt Rotheram – (redshirt) junior (6'6, 335); 75 – Jaryd Jones-Smith – freshman (6'7, 320); 76 – Ryan Schlieper – (redshirt) senior (6'5, 310); 78 – Cory King – (redshirt) senior (6'6, 325); Defensive lineman: 5 – Ejuan Price – (redshirt) sophomore (6'0, 255); 37 – David Durham – (redshirt) junior (6'2, 240); 50 – Tyrone Ezell – (redshirt) senior (6'4, 305); 52 – Shakir Soto – freshman (6'3, 290); 54 – Tyrique Jarrett – freshman (6'3, 335); 55 – Luke Maclean – freshman (6'5, 260); 56 – Justin Moody – freshman (6'3, 280); 76 – Jeremy Gonzales – freshman (6'1, 225); 90 – Jack Lippert – (redshirt) senior (6'4, 260); 91 – Darryl Render – sophomore (6'2, 300); 93 – Bryan Murphy – (redshirt) junior (6'3, 255); 94 – Jeremiah Taleni – freshman (6'2, 290); 95 – Khaynin Mosley-Smith – junior (6'0, 305); 96 – Devin Cook – (redshirt) sophomore (6'4, 240); 97 – Aaron Donald – senior (6'0, 285); 98 – LaQuentin Smith – junior (6'2, 280)	Linebacker: 3 – Nicholas Grigsby – (redshirt) sophomore (6'1, 220); 4 – Bam Bradley – (redshirt) freshman (6'2, 220); 8 – Todd Thomas – (redshirt) junior (6'2, 230); 22 – Devon Porchia – (redshirt) freshman (6'2, 245); 28 – Anthony Gonzalez – (redshirt) junior (6'3, 230); 30 – Mike Caprara – (redshirt) freshman (6'0, 215); 36 – Michael Dunn – freshman (6'4, 235); 44 – Shane Gordon – (redshirt) junior (6'1, 230); 47 – Matt Galambos – freshman (6'2, 245); 48 – Zach Poker – freshman (6'4, 240); 49 – Nico Elms – freshman (6'0, 210); 51 – Jacob Craig – (redshirt) freshman (6'2, 240); 59 – Emanuel Rackard – (redshirt) senior (6'0, 235); Defensive back: 2 – K'Waun Williams – senior (5'10, 195); 9 – Ray Vinopal – (redshirt) junior (5'10, 200); 10 – Jahmahl Pardner – (redshirt) freshman (5'11, 175); 15 – Reggie Mitchell – sophomore (6'0, 185); 21 – Titus Howard – freshman (6'1, 175); 19 – Terrish Webb – freshman (5'11, 170); 21 – Brendon Felder – (redshirt) junior (5'10, 190); 23 – Lafayette Pitts – (redshirt) sophomore (5'11, 195); 24 – Cullen Christian – (redshirt) junior (6'0, 195); 25 – Jason Hendricks – (redshirt) senior (6'0, 190); 26 – Jevonte Pitts – (redshirt) freshman (5'11, 205); 27 – Trenton Coles – (redshirt) freshman (6'3, 175); 35 – E.J. Banks – (redshirt) senior (5'11, 190); 38 – Ryan Lewis – (redshirt) freshman (6'0, 195); 39 – Pat Fisher – (redshirt) junior (5'9, 185); Long snappers: 58 – Kevin Barthelemy – (redshirt) senior (6'3, 245); 61 – Pat Quirin – (redshirt) freshman (6'1, 220); 67 – David Murphy – (redshirt) sophomore (6'1, 220)
Source and player details, 2013 Pittsburgh Panthers football roster (10/1/2022):

== Team players drafted into the NFL ==
Player	Position	Round	Pick	NFL club
Aaron Donald	Defensive tackle	1	13	St. Louis Rams
Tom Savage	Quarterback	4	135	Houston Texans
Devin Street	Wide receiver	5	146	Dallas Cowboys
