= 2014 Pittsburgh Panthers football team =

American college football season

2014 Pittsburgh Panthers football

Armed Forces Bowl, L 34–35 vs. Houston
- Conference: Atlantic Coast Conference
- Coastal Division
- Record: 6–7 (4–4 ACC)
- Head coach: Paul Chryst (3rd season; regular season); Joe Rudolph (interim, bowl game)
- Offensive coordinator: Joe Rudolph (3rd season)
- Offensive scheme: Pro-style
- Defensive coordinator: Matt House (2nd season)
- Base defense: 4–3
- Home stadium: Heinz Field

2014 Atlantic Coast Conference football standings
	Conf.			Overall
Team	W		L	W		L
Atlantic Division
No. T–5 Florida State x$^	8	–	0	13	–	1
No. 15 Clemson	6	–	2	10	–	3
No. 24 Louisville	5	–	3	9	–	4
Boston College	4	–	4	7	–	6
NC State	3	–	5	8	–	5
Syracuse	1	–	7	3	–	9
Wake Forest	1	–	7	3	–	9
Coastal Division
No. 8 Georgia Tech x	6	–	2	11	–	3
Duke	5	–	3	9	–	4
North Carolina	4	–	4	6	–	7
Pittsburgh	4	–	4	6	–	7
Miami (FL)	3	–	5	6	–	7
Virginia Tech	3	–	5	7	–	6
Virginia	3	–	5	5	–	7
Championship: Florida State 37, Georgia Tech 35
^ – College Football Playoff participant; $ – Conference champion; x – Division champion/co-champions; Rankings from AP Poll

The 2014 Pittsburgh Panthers football team represented the University of Pittsburgh in the 2014 NCAA Division I FBS football season. The Panthers were led by head coach Paul Chryst and played their home games at Heinz Field. They were a member of the Coastal Division of the Atlantic Coast Conference (ACC). This was Pitt's second season as a member of the ACC. They finished the season 6–7, 4–4 in ACC play to finish in a tie for third place in the Coastal Division. They were invited to the Armed Forces Bowl where they lost to Houston.

On December 18, head coach Paul Chryst resigned to become the head coach at Wisconsin. He finished with a three-year record of 19–19. Offensive coordinator Joe Rudolph was the Panthers interim head coach in the Armed Forces Bowl.

== Schedule ==
Date	Time	Opponent	Site	TV	Result	Attendance
August 30	12:00 p.m.	Delaware*	Heinz Field; Pittsburgh, PA	ESPN3	W 62–0	40,549
September 5	7:00 p.m.	at Boston College	Alumni Stadium; Chestnut Hill, MA	ESPN	W 30–20	30,083
September 13	12:00 p.m.	at FIU*	FIU Stadium; Miami, FL	FS1	W 42–25	10,147
September 20	12:00 p.m.	Iowa*	Heinz Field; Pittsburgh, PA	ESPNU	L 20–24	48,895
September 27	1:30 p.m.	Akron*	Heinz Field; Pittsburgh, PA	ESPN3	L 10–21	40,059
October 4	7:30 p.m.	at Virginia	Scott Stadium; Charlottesville, VA	ACCRSN	L 19–24	43,307
October 16	7:30 p.m.	Virginia Tech	Heinz Field; Pittsburgh, PA	ESPN	W 21–16	43,125
October 25	3:30 p.m.	Georgia Tech^{†}	Heinz Field; Pittsburgh, PA	ESPNU	L 28–56	44,734
November 1	12:00 p.m.	No. 24 Duke	Heinz Field; Pittsburgh, PA	ESPNU	L 48–51 ^{2OT}	39,293
November 15	12:30 p.m.	at North Carolina	Kenan Memorial Stadium; Chapel Hill, NC	ACCN	L 35–40	53,000
November 22	3:30 p.m.	Syracuse	Heinz Field; Pittsburgh, PA (rivalry)	ESPNU	W 30–7	32,549
November 29	7:00 p.m.	at Miami (FL)	Sun Life Stadium; Miami Gardens, FL	ESPN2	W 35–23	61,106
January 2	12:00 p.m.	vs. Houston*	Amon G. Carter Stadium; Fort Worth, TX (Armed Forces Bowl)	ESPN	L 34–35	37,888
*Non-conference game; ^{†}Homecoming; Rankings from AP Poll released prior to the game; All times are in Eastern time

== Personnel ==
=== Coaching staff ===
2014 Pittsburgh Panthers football staff
Coaching staff: Paul Chryst – Head coach/quarterbacks; Joe Rudolph – Assistant head coach/offensive coordinator/tight ends; Matt House – Defensive coordinator/linebackers; Chris Haering – Outside linebackers/special teams; Inoke Breckterfield – Defensive tackles; John Palermo – Defensive ends; Jim Hueber – Offensive line; Troy Douglas – Secondary; John Settle – Running backs; Greg Lewis – Wide receivers	Support staff: Chris LaSala – Assistant Athletic Director/football operations; Bob Junko – Director of player development and High School Relations; Hank Poteat – Defensive graduate assistant; Taylor Mehlhaff – Special teams Graduate Assistant; Jon Budmayr – Offensive graduate assistant; Ryan Turnley – Offensive graduate assistant	Strength and conditioning staff: Ross Kolodziej – Strength and conditioning coach; Brian Calhoun – Assistant strength and conditioning coach; Kenechi Udeze – Assistant strength and conditioning coach; Bill Nagy – Strength and conditioning Graduate Assistant

=== Roster ===
2014 Pittsburgh Panthers football roster
Quarterback: 7 – Adam Bertke – freshman (6'6, 235); 11 – Trey Anderson – (redshirt) junior (6'0, 195); 16 – Chad Voytik – (redshirt) sophomore (6'1, 215); 18 – Joe Repischak – freshman (6'2, 210); Running back: 5 – Chris James – freshman (5'11, 210); 20 – Dennis Briggs – freshman (5'10, 105); 22 – Jameel Poteat – senior (5'10, 215); 24 – James Conner – sophomore (6'2, 235); 29 - Rachid Ibrahim – sophomore (6'1, 195); 34 – Isaac Bennett – senior (5'11, 210); 37 – Qadree Ollison – freshman (6'2, 225); Wide receiver: 7 - Adonis Jennings – freshman (6'3, 195); 10 – Ronald Jones – (redshirt) junior (5'8, 170); 17 – Chris Wuestner – (redshirt) sophomore (6'2, 210); 19 – Dontez Ford – (redshirt) sophomore (6'2, 210); 23 – Tyler Boyd – sophomore (6'2, 200); 26 – Joey Brungo – freshman (6'1, 185); 28 – Elijah Zeise – freshman (6'2, 195); 32 – Jordan Jones – freshman (6'3, 215); 38 – Kyle Brown – freshman (6'4, 205); 39 – Jaquaun Davidson – freshman (6'2, 205); 48 - Kellen McAlone – freshman (6'2, 210); 80 - Zach Challingsworth – (redshirt) freshman (6'2, 195); 82 – Manasseh Garner – (redshirt) senior (6'2, 220); 85 – Jester Weah – (redshirt) freshman (6'3, 210); 88 – Kevin Weatherspoon – (redshirt) senior (5'10, 175); Placekicker: 12 – Chris Blewitt – sophomore (5'9, 195); 49 – Cory Huddleston – freshman (5'10, 170); Punter: 18 – Ryan Winslow – (redshirt) freshman (6'5, 225); 45 – Nick Goldsmith – freshman (6'2, 210)	Tight end: 31 – Jaymar Parrish – sophomore (6'2, 260); 45 – Devon Edwards – (redshirt) freshman (6'4, 275); 81 – Tony Harper – (redshirt) freshman (6'4, 225); 83 – Scott Orndoff – sophomore (6'5, 255); 84 – Brian O'Neill – freshman (6'6, 305); 86 – J.P. Holtz – junior (6'4, 250); Fullback: 35 - George Aston – freshman (6'0, 240); 40 - Colton Lively – (redshirt) freshman (6'0, 235); 41 - Anthony Rippole – (redshirt) sophomore (5'10, 230); 46 - Adam Lazenga – (redshirt) senior (6'0, 245); Offensive lineman: 50 – Mike Grimm – freshman (6'6, 320); 53 – Dorian Johnson – sophomore (6'5, 315); 57 – Artie Rowell – (redshirt) junior (6'2, 310); 60 – Aaron Reeese – (redshirt) freshman (6'5, 310); 62 – John Guy – (redshirt) sophomore (6'7, 310); 63 – Alex Officer – (redshirt) freshman (6'4, 340); 68 – T. J. Clemmings – (redshirt) senior (6'6, 315); 69 – Adam Bisnowaty – (redshirt) Sophomore (6'6, 305); 70 – Connor Hayes – freshman (6'4, 270); 71 – Gabe Roberts – (redshirt) Sophomore (6'5, 300); 72 – Carson Baker – (redshirt) freshman (6'5, 320); 74 – Matt Rotheram – (redshirt) senior (6'6, 335); 75 – Jaryd Jones-Smith – (redshirt) freshman (6'7, 320); 77 – Alex Galiyas – freshman (6'2, 290); 78 – Alex Bookser – freshman (6'6, 315); Defensive lineman: 5 – Ejuan Price – (redshirt) junior (6'0, 255); 44 - David Durham – (redshirt) senior (6'2, 240); 52 – Shakir Soto – sophomore (6'3, 290); 54 – Tyrique Jarrett – sophomore (6'3, 335); 55 – Luke Maclean – (redshirt) freshman (6'5, 260); 56 – Justin Moody – (redshirt) freshman (6'3, 280); 64 – Trent Neavin – (redshirt) freshman (6'1, 260); 66 – Mike Herndon – freshman (6'4, 310); 76 – Connor Dintino – freshman (6'3, 315); 90 – Hez Trahan – freshman (6'4, 250); 91 – Darryl Render – junior (6'2, 300); 92 – Rori Blair – freshman (6'4, 245); 93 – Shane Roy – freshman (6'4, 280); 94 – Jeremiah Taleni – (redshirt) freshman (6'2, 290); 95 – Khaynin Mosley-Smith – (redshirt) junior (6'0, 305); 96 – Devin Cook – (redshirt) junior (6'4, 240); 98 – LaQuentin Smith – senior (6'2, 280)	Linebacker: 3 – Nicholas Grigsby – (redshirt) junior (6'1, 220); 4 – Bam Bradley – (redshirt) sophomore (6'2, 220); 8 – Todd Thomas – (redshirt) senior (6'2, 230); 28 - Anthony Gonzalez – (redshirt) senior (6'3, 230); 30 – Mike Caprara – (redshirt) sophomore (6'0, 215); 36 – Michael Dunn – (redshirt) freshman (6'4, 235); 40 – James Folston Jr. – freshman (6'4, 250); 43 – Devon Porchia – (redshirt) sophomore (6'2, 245); 47 – Matt Galambos – sophomore (6'2, 245); 48 – Zach Poker – (redshirt) freshman (6'4, 240); 49 – Nico Elms – (redshirt) freshman (6'0, 210); 50 – Dominic Cuono – freshman (6'2, 220); 51 – Jacob Craig – (redshirt) sophomore (6'2, 240); 53 – Brian Popp – freshman (6'0, 220); 58 – Quintin Wirginis – freshman (6'2, 220); 59 – Jamal Davis II – freshman (6'2, 200); 67 – Alec Maternowski – freshman (5'11, 200); 87 – Reggie Green – (redshirt) freshman (6'2, 225); Defensive back: 2 – Terrish Webb – sophomore (5'11, 180); 6 – Lafayette Pitts – (redshirt) junior (5'11, 195); 9 – Ray Vinopal – (redshirt) senior (5'10, 200); 14 – Avonte Maddox – freshman (5'9, 165); 15 – Reggie Mitchell – (redshirt) sophomore (6'0, 185); 21 – Titus Howard – sophomore (6'1, 175); 22 – Khari Anderson – freshman (6'2, 195); 25 – Pat Amara – freshman (6'2, 190); 26 – Jevonte Pitts – (redshirt) sophomore (5'11, 205); 29 – Oluwaseun Idowu – freshman (6'0, 185); 32 – Phillipie Motley – freshman (5'10, 170); 35 – Jalen Williams – freshman (6'2, 180); 38 – Ryan Lewis – (redshirt) sophomore (6'0, 195); Long snappers: 61 – Pat Quirin – (redshirt) sophomore (6'1, 220); 67 – David Murphy – (redshirt) junior (6'1, 220)
Source and player details, 2014 Pittsburgh Panthers football roster (10/1/2022):

== Team players drafted into the NFL ==
Player	Position	Round	Pick	NFL club
T. J. Clemmings	Tackle	4	110	Minnesota Vikings
