= 2016 Pittsburgh Panthers football team =

American college football season

2016 Pittsburgh Panthers football

Pinstripe Bowl, L 24–31 vs. Northwestern
- Conference: Atlantic Coast Conference
- Coastal Division
- Record: 8–5 (5–3 ACC)
- Head coach: Pat Narduzzi (2nd season)
- Offensive coordinator: Matt Canada (1st season)
- Offensive scheme: Pro-style
- Defensive coordinator: Josh Conklin (2nd season)
- Base defense: 4–3
- Home stadium: Heinz Field

2016 Atlantic Coast Conference football standings
	Conf.			Overall
Team	W		L	W		L
Atlantic Division
No. 1 Clemson xy$#	7	–	1	14	–	1
No. 21 Louisville x	7	–	1	9	–	4
No. 8 Florida State	5	–	3	10	–	3
NC State	3	–	5	7	–	6
Wake Forest	3	–	5	7	–	6
Boston College	2	–	6	7	–	6
Syracuse	2	–	6	4	–	8
Coastal Division
No. 16 Virginia Tech xy	6	–	2	10	–	4
North Carolina	5	–	3	8	–	5
No. 20 Miami (FL)	5	–	3	9	–	4
Pittsburgh	5	–	3	8	–	5
Georgia Tech	4	–	4	9	–	4
Duke	1	–	7	4	–	8
Virginia	1	–	7	2	–	10
Championship: Clemson 42, Virginia Tech 35
# – College Football Playoff champion; $ – Conference champion; x – Division champion/co-champions; y – Championship game participant; Rankings from AP Poll

The 2016 Pittsburgh Panthers football team represented the University of Pittsburgh in the 2016 NCAA Division I FBS football season. The Panthers were led by second-year head coach Pat Narduzzi and played their home games at Heinz Field. They were a member of the Coastal Division of the Atlantic Coast Conference (ACC). The season marked Pitt's fourth season as a member of the ACC. The Panthers finished the season 8–5, 5–3 in ACC play to finish in a three-way tie for second place in the Coastal Division. The Panthers received an invitation to the Pinstripe Bowl at Yankee Stadium where they lost to Northwestern 31–24.

On September 10, 2016, the Panthers played their in-state rivals Penn State for the first time since 2000, where they were victorious, 42–39. Penn State had won seven of the previous eight games between the two schools.

== Offseason ==
=== 2016 NFL draft ===
Round	Pick	Team	Player	Position
2	55	Cincinnati Bengals	Tyler Boyd	Wide Receiver

==== NFL undrafted free agents ====
Team	Player	Position
Arizona Cardinals	Artie Rowell	Center
Pittsburgh Steelers	Khaynin Mosley-Smith	Defensive tackle
Los Angeles Rams	Nicholas Grigsby	Linebacker
Miami Dolphins	Lafayette Pitts	Cornerback
Cleveland Browns	J. P. Holtz	Tight End

=== Recruiting class ===
College recruiting
Name	Hometown	School	Height	Weight	Commit date
Aaron Mathews; ATH	Clairton, PA	Clairton	6 ft 5 in (1.96 m)	195 lb (88 kg)	Feb 2, 2026
Aaron Mathews; ATH	Recruit ratings: Scout: Rivals: 247Sports: ESPN: (78)				
Amir Watts; DT	Chicago, IL	Phillips Academy	6 ft 3 in (1.91 m)	270 lb (120 kg)	Jan 25, 2016
Amir Watts; DT	Recruit ratings: Scout: Rivals: 247Sports: ESPN: (75)				
Brandon Ford; OL	Pittsburgh, PA	Upper St. Clair	6 ft 5 in (1.96 m)	300 lb (140 kg)	Mar 3, 2015
Brandon Ford; OL	Recruit ratings: Scout: Rivals: 247Sports: ESPN: (76)				
Bricen Garner; S	Pittsburgh, PA	Central Catholic	6 ft 1 in (1.85 m)	172 lb (78 kg)	Jun 19, 2015
Bricen Garner; S	Recruit ratings: Scout: Rivals: 247Sports: ESPN: (75)				
Bryce Hargrove; DT	Akron, OH	Coventry	6 ft 5 in (1.96 m)	255 lb (116 kg)	Jul 24, 2015
Bryce Hargrove; DT	Recruit ratings: Scout: Rivals: 247Sports: ESPN: (70)				
Chase Pine; LB	Williamsburg, VA	Lafayette	6 ft 4 in (1.93 m)	220 lb (100 kg)	Jun 23, 2015
Chase Pine; LB	Recruit ratings: Scout: Rivals: 247Sports: ESPN: (76)				
Chawntez Moss; RB	Bedford, OH	Bedford	5 ft 11 in (1.80 m)	198 lb (90 kg)	Jun 21, 2015
Chawntez Moss; RB	Recruit ratings: Scout: Rivals: 247Sports: ESPN: (75)				
Damar Hamlin; CB	Pittsburgh, PA	Central Catholic	6 ft 1 in (1.85 m)	182 lb (83 kg)	Feb 2, 2026
Damar Hamlin; CB	Recruit ratings: Scout: Rivals: 247Sports: ESPN: (83)				
Elias Reynolds; LB	Brooklyn, NY	Poly Prep	6 ft 3 in (1.91 m)	225 lb (102 kg)	Jan 24, 2016
Elias Reynolds; LB	Recruit ratings: Scout: Rivals: 247Sports: ESPN: (72)				
George Hill; ATH	Hubbard, OH	Hubbard	6 ft 0 in (1.83 m)	200 lb (91 kg)	Dec 18, 2015
George Hill; ATH	Recruit ratings: Scout: Rivals: 247Sports: ESPN: (82)				
Henry Miller; CB	Kissimmee, FL	Gateway	6 ft 3 in (1.91 m)	195 lb (88 kg)	Dec 18, 2015
Henry Miller; CB	Recruit ratings: Scout: Rivals: 247Sports: ESPN: (77)				
Justin Morgan; OT	Brooklyn, NY	Poly Prep	6 ft 6 in (1.98 m)	335 lb (152 kg)	Dec 15, 2015
Justin Morgan; OT	Recruit ratings: Scout: Rivals: 247Sports: ESPN: (72)				
Kaezon Pugh; LB	Aliquippa, PA	Aliquippa	6 ft 1 in (1.85 m)	206 lb (93 kg)	Oct 10, 2015
Kaezon Pugh; LB	Recruit ratings: Scout: Rivals: 247Sports: ESPN: (79)				
Keyshon Camp; DT	Lakeland, FL	Lake Gibson	6 ft 4 in (1.93 m)	272 lb (123 kg)	Feb 3, 2016
Keyshon Camp; DT	Recruit ratings: Scout: Rivals: 247Sports: ESPN: (82)				
Maurice Ffrench; WR	New Brunswick, NJ	New Brunswick	5 ft 11 in (1.80 m)	185 lb (84 kg)	Jun 26, 2015
Maurice Ffrench; WR	Recruit ratings: Scout: Rivals: 247Sports: ESPN: (71)				
Patrick Jones II; DE	Chesapeake, VA	Grassfield	6 ft 5 in (1.96 m)	228 lb (103 kg)	Dec 2, 2015
Patrick Jones II; DE	Recruit ratings: Scout: Rivals: 247Sports: ESPN: (75)				
Phil Campbell; S	Monmouth Junction, NJ	South Brunswick	6 ft 1 in (1.85 m)	195 lb (88 kg)	Dec 13, 2015
Phil Campbell; S	Recruit ratings: Scout: Rivals: 247Sports: ESPN: (74)				
Rashad Weaver; DE	Cooper City, FL	Cooper City	6 ft 5 in (1.96 m)	247 lb (112 kg)	Feb 3, 2016
Rashad Weaver; DE	Recruit ratings: Scout: Rivals: 247Sports: ESPN: (77)				
Rashad Wheeler; DT	Pittsburgh, PA	Central Catholic	6 ft 3 in (1.91 m)	279 lb (127 kg)	Aug 11, 2015
Rashad Wheeler; DT	Recruit ratings: Scout: Rivals: 247Sports: ESPN: (76)				
Ruben Flowers; WR	Lima, OH	Lima	6 ft 4 in (1.93 m)	190 lb (86 kg)	Jun 26, 2015
Ruben Flowers; WR	Recruit ratings: Scout: Rivals: 247Sports: ESPN: (79)				
Therran Coleman; CB	Pittsburgh, PA	Brashear	6 ft 0 in (1.83 m)	178 lb (81 kg)	Aug 31, 2015
Therran Coleman; CB	Recruit ratings: Scout: Rivals: 247Sports: ESPN: (79)				
Thomas MacVittie; QB	Cincinnati, OH	Moeller	6 ft 4 in (1.93 m)	210 lb (95 kg)	Mar 26, 2015
Thomas MacVittie; QB	Recruit ratings: Scout: Rivals: 247Sports: ESPN: (78)				
Zack Gilbert; DE	Charlotte, NC	South Mecklenburg	6 ft 1 in (1.85 m)	253 lb (115 kg)	Nov 28, 2015
Zack Gilbert; DE	Recruit ratings: Scout: Rivals: 247Sports: ESPN: (78)				
Zack Williams; OT	Citra, FL	Farragut Academy	6 ft 5 in (1.96 m)	269 lb (122 kg)	Dec 13, 2015
Zack Williams; OT	Recruit ratings: Scout: Rivals: 247Sports: ESPN: (72)				
Overall recruit ranking: Scout: 26 Rivals: 31 247Sports: 30 ESPN: 31
Note: In many cases, Scout, Rivals, 247Sports, On3, and ESPN may conflict in their listings of height and weight.; In these cases, the average was taken. ESPN grades are on a 100-point scale.; Sources: "Pittsburgh Football Commitments". Rivals.; "2016 Player Commits". ESPN.; "2016 Team Ranking". Rivals.com.; "Pittsburgh 2016 Football Commits". 247Sports.

=== Injuries ===
It was announced that several players would be missing for the upcoming season due to injury. Sophomore tight end Chris Clark underwent knee surgery, while redshirt sophomore offensive lineman Mike Grimm underwent hip surgery; both missed the entire 2016 season. Junior defensive tackle Justin Moody was forced to retire due to a non-football-related cervical spine condition; he remained on the team as a student assistant. Additionally, incoming recruits Zack Gilbert and George Hill, both suffering from heart conditions, also missed the 2016 season.

== Schedule ==
The Panthers schedule was released on January 26, 2016. The blue team defeated the gold team, 19–17, in the spring game on Saturday April 16, 2016 at Heinz Field.

Date	Time	Opponent	Rank	Site	TV	Result	Attendance
September 3	1:30 p.m.	No. 23 (FCS) Villanova*		Heinz Field; Pittsburgh, PA	ACCN+	W 28–7	50,149
September 10	12:00 p.m.	Penn State*		Heinz Field; Pittsburgh, PA (rivalry)	ESPN	W 42–39	69,983
September 17	3:30 p.m.	at Oklahoma State*		Boone Pickens Stadium; Stillwater, OK	ESPN	L 38–45	53,514
September 24	3:30 p.m.	at North Carolina		Kenan Memorial Stadium; Chapel Hill, NC	ESPNU	L 36–37	54,500
October 1	7:30 p.m.	Marshall*		Heinz Field; Pittsburgh, PA	ACCRSN	W 43–27	45,246
October 8	12:30 p.m.	Georgia Tech^{†}		Heinz Field; Pittsburgh, PA	ACCN	W 37–34	47,425
October 15	12:30 p.m.	at Virginia		Scott Stadium; Charlottesville, VA	ACCN	W 45–31	39,522
October 27	7:00 p.m.	No. 25 Virginia Tech		Heinz Field; Pittsburgh, PA	ESPN	L 36–39	40,254
November 5	12:30 p.m.	at Miami (FL)		Hard Rock Stadium; Miami Gardens, FL	ACCN	L 28–51	51,796
November 12	3:30 p.m.	at No. 2 Clemson		Memorial Stadium; Clemson, SC	ABC	W 43–42	81,048
November 19	3:00 p.m.	Duke		Heinz Field; Pittsburgh, PA	ACCRSN	W 56–14	35,425
November 26	12:30 p.m.	Syracuse		Heinz Field; Pittsburgh, PA (rivalry)	ACCN/WTAE-TV (Note: This game aired on Pittsburgh ABC affiliate WTAE's main signal, while the one between Michigan and Ohio State aired on ESPN2 and on the This TV digital subchannel the station had at the time.)	W 76–61	34,049
December 28	2:00 p.m.	vs. Northwestern*	No. 23	Yankee Stadium; Bronx, NY (Pinstripe Bowl)	ESPN	L 24–31	37,918
*Non-conference game; ^{†}Homecoming; Rankings from AP Poll and CFP Rankings after November 1 released prior to game; All times are in Eastern time

== Game summaries ==
=== Villanova ===
Villanova at Pittsburgh

Team	1	2	3	4	Total
Wildcats	0	0	7	0	7
• Panthers	0	14	7	7	28

- Date: September 3
- Location:
  Heinz Field
  Pittsburgh, PA
- Game start: 1:33 p.m. EDT
- Elapsed time: 3:15
- Game attendance: 50,149
- Game weather: 76 °F (24 °C) • Wind NE 4 mph (6.4 km/h) • Sunny
- Referee: Duane Heydt
- TV announcers (ACCN):
  Play-by-Play: Dave Weekley
  Analyst: John Gregory

Scoring summary
2	07:08	Pittsburgh	James Conner 3-yard run (Chris Blewitt kick), Drive: 6 plays, 32 yards, 3:13	7–0
2	00:19	Pittsburgh	James Conner 9-yard pass from Nathan Peterman (Chris Blewitt kick), Drive: 6 plays, 32 yards, 1:02	14–0
3	14:48	Pittsburgh	Quadree Henderson 96-yard kickoff return (Chris Blewitt kick), Drive: 0 plays, 0 yards, 0:00	21–0
3	10:35	Villanova	Rob Rolle 3-yard fumble return (Gerard Smith kick), Drive: 3 plays, −15 yards, 0:58	21–7
4	06:00	Pittsburgh	Jester Weah 16-yard pass from Nathan Peterman (Chris Blewitt kick), Drive: 10 plays, 49 yards, 5:24	28–7

The Panthers opened the 2016 season against an FCS opponent in Villanova.

The Wildcats controlled play for portions of the first half, but three straight drives into Pitt territory failed to produce any points, giving the Panthers time to get going. Running back James Conner, having missed the entire 2015 season due to a torn MCL and after having battled Hodgkin's lymphoma in the off-season, returned to the field and scored 2 touchdowns in the 2nd quarter. The first came on a 3-yard run; the second came on a 9-yard pass from Nathan Peterman. Quadree Henderson returned the second-half kickoff 96 yards for a score to break things open. Rob Rolle returned a Peterman fumble 3 yards for a touchdown in the third quarter for Villanova's only score. Peterman completed 19 of 32 passes for 175 yards and two touchdowns, including a pretty 16-yard touchdown pass to Jester Weah in the 4th quarter. The Panthers managed just 261 total yards. Defensively, the Panthers only allowed 172 yards and forced 2 turnovers, including a Terrish Webb interception.

Dewayne Hendrix and Elijah Zeise were injured during the game; their injuries were initially thought to be not serious, but it was later announced after the Penn State game the following week that both would miss the remainder of the season.

=== Penn State ===
Penn State at Pittsburgh

Team	1	2	3	4	Total
Nittany Lions	7	7	7	18	39
• Panthers	14	14	7	7	42

- Date: September 10
- Location:
  Heinz Field
  Pittsburgh, PA
- Game start: 12:01 p.m. EDT
- Elapsed time: 3:15
- Game attendance: 69,983
- Game weather: 85 °F (29 °C) • Wind SW 7 mph (11 km/h) • Partly cloudy
- Referee: Jerry McGinn
- TV announcers (ESPN):
  Play-by-Play: Bob Wischusen
  Analyst: Brock Huard
  Sideline: Allison Williams

Scoring summary
1	08:03	Pittsburgh	George Aston 1-yard run (Chris Blewitt kick), Drive: 10 plays, 99 yards, 4:43	7–0
1	07:16	Pittsburgh	Quadree Henderson 7-yard pass from Nathan Peterman (Chris Blewitt kick), Drive: 2 plays, 12 yards, 0:38	14–0
1	02:42	Penn State	Saquon Barkley 3-yard run (Tyler Davis kick), Drive: 1 play, 15 yards, 0:09	14–7
2	13:38	Pittsburgh	Scott Orndorff 2-yard pass from Nathan Peterman (Chris Blewitt kick), Drive: 9 plays, 74 yards, 4:04	21–7
2	11:54	Pittsburgh	George Aston 3-yard run (Chris Blewitt kick), Drive: 3 plays, 30 yards, 1:07	28–7
2	00:42	Penn State	Saquon Barkley 1-yard run (Tyler Davis kick), Drive: 8 plays, 83 yards, 2:35	28–14
3	11:54	Penn State	Saquon Barkley 40-yard pass from Trace McSorley (Tyler Davis kick), Drive: 2 plays, 46 yards, 0:39	28–21
3	07:24	Pittsburgh	James Conner 1-yard run (Chris Blewitt kick), Drive: 11 plays, 75 yards, 4:30	35–21
4	13:42	Penn State	Saquon Barkley 1-yard run (Tyler Davis kick), Drive: 7 plays, 68 yards, 2:04	35–28
4	12:04	Penn State	Tyler Davis 38-yard field goal, Drive: 4 plays, −9 yards, 1:31	35–31
4	10:24	Pittsburgh	James Conner 12-yard pass from Nathan Peterman (Chris Blewitt kick), Drive: 3 plays, 10 yards, 1:40	42–31
4	05:00	Penn State	Saquon Barkley 2-yard run (DeSean Hamilton pass from Trace McSorley for a two-point conv.), Drive: 6 plays, 60 yards, 1:30	42–39

Following their victory over Villanova, the Panthers would host in-state rival Penn State. The two schools hadn't played each other since the 2000 season, where Pitt shut out the Nittany Lions 12–0 at the old Three Rivers Stadium.

The Panthers jumped out to a 28–7 lead in the first half behind a powerful rushing attack, spearheaded by James Conner. George Aston struck first with a 1-yard touchdown run to give Pitt the lead 7–0. The Panthers scored again on their very next possession on a 7-yard touchdown pass from Nathan Peterman to Quadree Henderson, swelling the lead to 14–0. A 3-yard Saquon Barkley touchdown run cut the Pitt lead to 7 before the end of the 1st quarter.

The Panthers scored on the first possession of the 2nd quarter on a 2yard touchdown pass from Peterman to Scott Orndoff. They would add to their lead the very next drive with a George Aston 3-yard touchdown run, putting the lead at 28–7. Just before the end of the half, Saquon Barkley again scored a touchdown for the Nittany Lions, this time from 1 yard out, to pull Penn State within 2 scores at the half.

Penn State would score on their first possession of the second half on a 40-yard touchdown pass from Trace McSorley to Saquon Barkley to cut the Pittsburgh lead to a touchdown, 28–21. The Panthers would respond with an 11 play, 75-yard drive, capped off with a 1-yard touchdown run from James Conner. On the following Penn State possession, Dennis Briggs would force Saquon Barkley to fumble the ball, which would be recovered by the Panthers at their own 35-yard line. The offense would fail to capitalize on the turnover, as Chris Blewitt would miss a 50-yard field goal.

Following the missed field goal, the Nittany Lions went to work in the 4th quarter, scoring on the first possession on a Saquon Barkley 1-yard touchdown run, putting the score at 35–28, Pitt. The Panthers would shoot themselves in the foot on the next possession, as James Conner fumbled the ball deep in Pittsburgh territory, giving Penn State favorable field position at the PITT 11 yard line. However, the defense would hold strong in spite of this, holding Penn State to a field goal and not allowing them to tie the game. Early in the 4th quarter, Pitt clung to a 35–31 lead. On the ensuing kickoff, Quadree Henderson would return the ball 84-yards to the Penn State 10-yard line, where a few plays later, Nathan Peterman would shovel pass the ball to James Conner, who would take it into the end zone from 12-yards out, giving the Panthers a 2 score lead once again, 42–31. After trading possessions, Penn State would close the gap to 3 when, again, Saquon Barkley scored on a 3-yard touchdown run. Trace McSorley would connect with DaeSean Hamilton on the 2-point conversion, put the score at 42–39, Pitt, with 5 minutes remaining in the game. After a Pittsburgh 3-and-out, Penn State would receive the ball with under 4 minutes left in the game at their own 29-yard line. They would drive the ball all the way to the PITT 31 yard line before Senior cornerback Ryan Lewis picked off Trace McSorley in the end zone with just over a minute to play, ensuring a 42–39 victory for Pitt.

Saquon Barkley accounted for all 5 of Penn State's touchdowns and James Conner ran for 117 yards and a touchdown and caught another; as a team, the Panthers rushed for 359 yards. The game was also played in front of the largest crowd in the history of the city of Pittsburgh to watch a sporting event (69,983). The Panthers moved to 2–0 on the season, renewing a heated in-state rivalry in the process.

=== At Oklahoma State ===
Pittsburgh at Oklahoma State

Team	1	2	3	4	Total
Panthers	10	14	14	0	38
• Cowboys	10	21	7	7	45

- Date: September 17
- Location:
  Boone Pickens Stadium
  Stillwater, OK
- Game start: 3:35 p.m. EDT
- Elapsed time: 5:40
- Game attendance: 53,514
- Game weather: 82 °F (28 °C) • Wind 5 mph (8.0 km/h) • Partly cloudy
- Referee: Gary Patterson
- TV announcers (ESPN):
  Play-by-Play: Jason Benetti
  Analyst: Kelly Stouffer
  Sideline: Paul Carcaterra

Scoring summary
1	14:44	Oklahoma State	James Washington 91-yard pass from Mason Rudolph (Ben Grogan kick), Drive: 1 play, 91 yards, 0:16	0–7
1	13:09	Pittsburgh	Quadree Henderson 10-yard run (Chris Blewitt kick), Drive: 4 plays, 70 yards, 1:35	7–7
1	05:51	Pittsburgh	Chris Blewitt 48-yard field goal, Drive: 9 plays, 38 yards, 4:33	10–7
1	04:26	Oklahoma State	Ben Grogan 45-yard field goal, Drive: 7 plays, 47 yards, 1:25	10–10
2	13:09	Oklahoma State	James Washington 29-yard pass from Mason Rudolph (Ben Grogan kick), Drive: 7 plays, 99 yards, 2:33	10–17
2	09:44	Oklahoma State	Rennie Childs 1-yard run (Ben Grogan kick), Drive: 8 plays, 80 yards, 1:53	10–24
2	04:59	Pittsburgh	James Conner 1-yard run (Chris Blewitt kick), Drive: 9 plays, 83 yards, 4:45	17–24
2	04:04	Oklahoma State	Rennie Childs 67-yard run (Ben Grogan kick), Drive: 3 plays, 75 yards, 0:55	17–31
2	01:47	Pittsburgh	Jester Weah 60-yard pass from Nathan Peterman (Chris Blewitt kick), Drive: 1 play, 60 yards, 0:09	24–31
3	10:25	Pittsburgh	Matt Galambos 2-yard fumble return (Chris Blewitt kick), Drive: 1 play, −9 yards, 0:06	31–31
3	09:01	Oklahoma State	Rennie Childs 5-yard run (Ben Grogan kick), Drive: 7 plays, 80 yards, 1:24	31–38
3	05:28	Pittsburgh	Quadree Henderson 50-yard run (Chris Blewitt kick), Drive: 4 plays, 70 yards, 1:57	38–38
4	01:28	Oklahoma State	Rennie Childs 1-yard run (Ben Grogan kick), Drive: 3 plays, 88 yards, 0:39	38–45

=== At North Carolina ===
Pittsburgh at North Carolina

Team	1	2	3	4	Total
Panthers	5	14	14	3	36
• Tar Heels	0	16	7	14	37

- Date:
  September 24
- Location:
  Kenan Memorial Stadium
  Chapel Hill, NC
- Game start: 3:33 p.m. EDT
- Elapsed time: 3:31
- Game attendance: 54,500
- Game weather: 92 °F (33 °C) • Wind WNW 5 mph (8.0 km/h) • Mostly sunny
- Referee: Jeff Flanagan
- TV announcers (ESPNU):
  Play-by-Play: Clay Matvick
  Analyst: Dusty Dvoracek

Scoring summary
1	10:30	Pittsburgh	Ejuan Price Safety, Drive: 1 play, −5 yards, 0:00	2–0
1	02:16	Pittsburgh	Chris Blewitt 50-yard field goal, Drive: 14 plays, 42 yards, 8:14	5–0
2	12:55	Pittsburgh	James Conner 1-yard run (Chris Blewitt kick), Drive: 7 plays, 41 yards, 3:48	12–0
2	11:40	North Carolina	Mack Hollins 39-yard pass from Mitch Trubisky (Nick Weiler kick), Drive: 3 plays, 91 yards, 1:15	12–7
2	06:28	Pittsburgh	George Aston 3-yard run (Chris Blewitt kick), Drive: 11 plays, 75 yards, 5:12	19–7
2	03:12	North Carolina	Ryan Switzer 19-yard pass from Mitch Trubisky (two-point pass conv. failed), Drive: 10 plays, 74 yards, 3:16	19–13
2	00:00	North Carolina	Nick Weiler 34-yard field goal, Drive: 5 plays, 34 yards, 0:43	19–16
3	10:54	Pittsburgh	Chawntez Moss 2-yard run (Chris Blewitt kick), Drive: 5 plays, 56 yards, 2:17	26–16
3	08:32	North Carolina	Austin Proehl 1-yard pass from Mitch Trubisky (Nick Weiler kick), Drive: 8 plays, 75 yards, 2:22	26–23
3	02:24	Pittsburgh	Nathan Peterman 1-yard run (Chris Blewitt kick), Drive: 11 plays, 82 yards, 6:08	33–23
4	11:03	Pittsburgh	Chris Blewitt 40-yard field goal, Drive: 6 plays, 47 yards, 2:42	36–23
4	05:24	North Carolina	Bug Howard 2-yard pass from Mitch Trubisky (Nick Weiler kick), Drive: 8 plays, 45 yards, 2:10	36–30
4	00:02	North Carolina	Bug Howard 2-yard pass from Mitch Trubisky (Nick Weiler kick), Drive: 17 plays, 63 yards, 3:33	36–37

Mitchell Trubisky kept scanning the field, delivering the ball on target with a cool composure for North Carolina down to when he made the game's biggest play in the frantic final seconds. The junior threw a 2-yard touchdown pass to Bug Howard with 2 seconds left to help the Tar Heels rally past Pittsburgh 37–36 on Saturday in the Atlantic Coast Conference opener for two teams that finished 1–2 atop the Coastal Division last season. "We had talked about before the game that we had an opportunity to establish the identity of this football team", UNC coach Larry Fedora said. And I can say there's a lot of grit in this football team for one, a lot of toughness all the intangibles that we need to be successful. Trubisky threw for career highs of 453 yards and five touchdowns for the Tar Heels (3–1, 1–0 ACC). His main target was Ryan Switzer, who tied a program record with 16 catches for 208 yards and a score.

The Tar Heels never led until the final play and trailed by 13 with 6 minutes left. But Trubisky led a 17-play, 63-yard drive that included three fourth-down conversions in a stunning finish, sending UNC's players running onto the field to celebrate once they stopped Pitt's final-play kick return. Everybody believed, man, Howard said. "We had some fans leaving and stuff, people was giving up on us after they scored that last touchdown. But the defense had our back, we had their back, we told them if they'd get one more stop, we're going to make it happen." Quadree Henderson ran for 107 yards to for the Panthers (2–2, 0–1), who ran for 281 yards but went three-and-out on their last two drives to give UNC its opening. "When something like that (comeback) happens, you have to look at yourself first: Did I do everything I needed to do to get us a victory?" Pitt defensive end Ejuan Price said. "I think that answer is no." Simply put, the Panthers have to get better against the pass. Dating to last week's loss at Oklahoma State, Pitt has surrendered 993 yards through the air couldn't get a stop late, even as coach Pat Narduzzi said he thought the team was "a lot sounder" this week. "I thought our coaches did a great job putting them in position to make plays today," Narduzzi said. "It comes down to, `Is that going to be a catch at the end?"

Pittsburgh averaged 5.1 yards per carry even after losing 28 yards on a bad first-quarter snap, with James Conner among four players to rush for TDs. The Panthers held the Tar Heels to 18 yards rushing. The Panthers step out of ACC play to host Marshall in the first meeting between the schools next week.

=== Marshall ===
Marshall at Pittsburgh

Team	1	2	3	4	Total
Thundering Herd	0	0	14	13	27
• Panthers	20	7	3	13	43

- Date: October 1
- Location:
  Heinz Field
  Pittsburgh, PA
- Game start: 7:34 p.m. EDT
- Elapsed time: 3:08
- Game attendance: 45,246
- Game weather: 66 °F (19 °C) • Wind SW 2 mph (3.2 km/h) • Cloudy with showers
- Referee: D. Gautreaux
- TV announcers (ACCRSN/RTPT):
  Play-by-Play: Bob Rathbun
  Analyst: Takeo Spikes
  Sideline: Rebecca Kaple

Scoring summary
1	11:17	Pittsburgh	George Aston 5-yard run (Chris Blewitt kick failed), Drive: 8 plays, 75 yards, 3:43	6–0
1	05:03	Pittsburgh	James Conner 1-yard run (Chris Blewitt kick), Drive: 7 plays, 83 yards, 3:22	13–0
1	00:50	Pittsburgh	Maurice Ffrench 11-yard run (Chris Blewitt kick), Drive: 5 plays, 96 yards, 1:54	20–0
2	00:53	Pittsburgh	Tre Tipton 15-yard pass from Nathan Peterman (Chris Blewitt kick), Drive: 7 plays, 81 yards, 3:30	27–0
3	09:12	Marshall	Josh Knight 15-yard pass from Chase Litton (Amoreto Curraj kick), Drive: 15 plays, 80 yards, 5:48	27–7
3	05:20	Marshall	Anthony Anderson 11-yard run (Amoreto Curraj kick), Drive: 8 plays, 47 yards, 3:52	27–14
3	00:30	Pittsburgh	Chris Blewitt 20-yard field goal, Drive: 9 plays, 73 yards, 4:50	30–14
4	14:47	Marshall	Michael Clark 83-yard pass from Chase Litton (two-point pass conv. failed), Drive: 2 plays, 86 yards, 0:43	30–20
4	04:01	Marshall	Keion Davis 1-yard run (Amoreto Curraj kick), Drive: 12 plays, 67 yards, 5:02	30–27
4	01:04	Pittsburgh	Jester Weah 54-yard pass from Nathan Peterman (Chris Blewitt kick), Drive: 6 plays, 75 yards, 2:57	37–27
4	00:00	Pittsburgh	Avonte Maddox 33-yard interception return, Drive: 4 plays, −14 yards, 1:04	43–27

A four-touchdown lead gone against Marshall on Saturday night, Pittsburgh could have played it safe. Up by a field goal and facing third down near midfield, Pitt quarterback Nathan Peterman lobbed a deep ball to Jester Weah down the sideline. The junior wide receiver pulled it in over a defender and raced to the end zone for a 54-yard touchdown with 1:04 remaining and the Panthers pulled away late for a 43–27 win.

"I loved it when they called the play," Weah said. "I knew I had the ability to make the play. I just had to go out there and just do it." And help Pitt (3–2) avoid another late meltdown. Two weeks after giving up the go-ahead touchdown with 2:18 to play in a loss at Oklahoma State and seven days after a 13-point fourth-quarter lead turned into a last-second loss at North Carolina, the Panthers appeared in trouble again when Marshall's Keion Davis scored on a 1-yard run with 4:01 to play to pull the Thundering Herd (1–3) within 30–27.

After falling to the Tar Heels, Pitt coach Pat Narduzzi said his team couldn't afford to become predictable in late-game situations. Offensive coordinator Matt Canada was listening. Peterman hit Scott Orndoff on third down to extend the drive before Peterman's second touchdown of the game let the Panthers exhale. "The best thing is we made plays when we needed to at the end," Narduzzi said. Peterman finished with a season-high 280 yards passing and two scores. Weah caught seven passes for 176 yards and freshman Chawntez Moss ran for 97 yards. Pitt outgained the Thundering Herd 532–344. Still, it wasn't exactly easy. Marshall quarterback Chase Litton returned after missing a loss to Louisville last week and threw for 240 yards with two touchdowns and an interception. Michael Clark caught four passes for 147 yards, including an 83-yard touchdown as part of Marshall's methodical rally, one that hardly seemed possible after an opening 30 minutes in which Pitt did whatever it wanted.

Pitt entered the game with the 127th-ranked pass defense in the nation, next-to-last in the FBS. While Litton and Clark heated up in the second half, the Panthers got in the final word. Cornerback Avonte Maddox, picked on repeatedly by opponents over the last three weeks, returned a Litton pass 33 yards for a score on the game's final play. "Avonte Maddox needed that", Narduzzi said. Pitt gets back into ACC action when it hosts Georgia Tech next Saturday.

=== Georgia Tech ===
Georgia Tech at Pittsburgh

Team	1	2	3	4	Total
Yellow Jackets	3	17	0	14	34
• Panthers	7	14	3	13	37

- Date: October 8
- Location:
  Heinz Field
  Pittsburgh, PA
- Game start: 12:30 p.m. EDT
- Elapsed time: 3:16
- Game attendance: 47,425
- Game weather: 58 °F (14 °C) • Wind NNW 9 mph (14 km/h) • Cloudy with showers
- Referee: Jerry Magallanes
- TV announcers (ACCN):
  Play-by-Play: Tom Werme
  Analyst: Dave Archer
  Sideline: Roddy Jones

Scoring summary
1	11:52	Pittsburgh	Brian O'Neill 24-yard run (Chris Blewitt kick), Drive: 6 plays, 75 yards, 3:08	7–0
1	03:42	Georgia Tech	Harrison Butker 37-yard field goal, Drive: 14 plays, 71 yards, 8:10	7–3
2	12:19	Pittsburgh	Qadree Ollison 4-yard run (Chris Blewitt kick), Drive: 14 plays, 75 yards, 6:23	14–3
2	12:04	Georgia Tech	J.J. Green 96-yard kickoff return (Harrison Butker kick), Drive: 0 plays, 0 yards, 0:00	14–10
2	06:39	Pittsburgh	Quadree Henderson 10-yard run (Chris Blewitt kick), Drive: 9 plays, 69 yards, 5:25	21–10
2	01:48	Georgia Tech	Ricky Jeune 31-yard pass from Justin Thomas (Harrison Butker kick), Drive: 10 plays, 75 yards, 4:51	21–17
2	00:02	Georgia Tech	Harrison Butker 41-yard field goal, Drive: 5 plays, 43 yards, 0:33	21–20
3	02:51	Pittsburgh	Chris Blewitt 34-yard field goal, Drive: 11 plays, 48 yards, 5:28	24–20
4	12:19	Pittsburgh	Chris Blewitt 41-yard field goal, Drive: 9 plays, 24 yards, 3:38	27–20
4	10:01	Georgia Tech	Clinton Lynch 45-yard run (Harrison Butker kick), Drive: 4 plays, 75 yards, 2:18	27–27
4	05:22	Georgia Tech	J.J. Green 10-yard run (Harrison Butker kick), Drive: 6 plays, 39 yards, 2:54	27–34
4	03:50	Pittsburgh	Scott Orndoff 74-yard pass from Nathan Peterman (Chris Blewitt kick), Drive: 3 plays, 75 yards, 1:32	34–34
4	00:00	Pittsburgh	Chris Blewitt 31-yard field goal, Drive: 6 plays, 21 yards, 1:47	37–34

Another fourth-quarter lead gone, Pittsburgh responded with a redemption for its defense to surge past struggling Georgia Tech. First, Scott Orndoff kept his head while hauling in a tipped pass from Nate Peterman the tight end turned into a game-tying 74-yard touchdown with 3:50 to play. Then nose tackle Tyrique Jarrett stuffed Yellow Jackets running back Dedrick Mills on fourth down to give Pitt the ball back with 1:47 left to set up Chris Blewitt's bank shot 31-yard field goal as time expired. "I think it's just about believing and never getting down on yourself or on your team," Orndoff said. "Just hanging in there."

Something Pitt (4–2, 1–1 ACC) is getting used to under coach Pat Narduzzi. The outcome has hung in the balance in the final 2 minutes each of the last five weeks, including a last-second loss to North Carolina two weeks ago in which the Tar Heels converted four fourth-downs on the deciding drive.

That's what made Jarrett and linebacker Matt Galambos' stop so satisfying. The clock dwindling, Georgia Tech went for it on fourth-and-1 at its own 34 rather than kick it. Galombos—who Narduzzi describes as the defense's "computer"—sensed a dive play was coming and changed the call right before the snap, leading Jarrett to stand up Mills short of the first down. "I happened to guess right," Jarrett said. "It was perfect."

Pitt drove to the Georgia Tech 12 to set up Blewitt's winner, which smacked off the right upright and through as time expired. It's the second straight season Pitt topped the Yellow Jackets on a late kick by Blewitt, whose 52 career field goals are a school record. "Called corner pocket," Blewitt joked. Georgia Tech coach Paul Johnson defended the decision to go for it rather than kick it and give Pitt's offense, which punted just once all day, another shot. Instead, the Yellow Jackets (3–3, 1–3 ACC) dropped their third straight overall and their sixth straight true road game dating back to 2014.

"If I to do over again at the end of the game, I probably still would have gone for it but I would have called a different play," Johnson said. "I felt the way the game was going, I felt like we could make a half-yard and we didn't so that's on me. That's my responsibility and I'll take the blame for it." Peterman finished 14 of 20 for 192 yards and the long score to Orndoff. The Panthers spread the ball around while running for 215 yards, including a 24-yard run by 300-pound Pitt lineman Brian O'Neill on a designed throwback lateral. Pitt offensive coordinator Matt Canada installed the play this week specifically for O'Neill, a former tight end. He caught the ball and was surrounded by teammates while being escorted to the end zone.

"(Canada) told me don't do anything stupid when you score a touchdown because you're going to score a touchdown," O'Neill said. Pitt travels to Virginia to take on the Cavaliers. Each team has won on its home field in the series since the Panthers joined the ACC in 2013.

=== At Virginia ===
Pittsburgh at Virginia

Team	1	2	3	4	Total
• Panthers	14	21	0	10	45
Cavaliers	21	7	0	3	31

- Date: October 15
- Location:
  Scott Stadium
  Charlottesville, VA
- Game start: 12:30 p.m. EDT
- Elapsed time: 3:38
- Game attendance: 39,522
- Referee: Ron Cherry
- TV announcers (ACCN):
  Play-by-Play: Tom Werme
  Analyst: Dave Archer
  Sideline: Roddy Jones

Scoring summary
1	10:31	Virginia	Albert Reid 5-yard run (Sam Hayward kick), Drive: 12 plays, 69 yards, 4:29	0–7
1	05:41	Pittsburgh	Jester Weah 38-yard pass from Nathan Peterman (Chris Blewitt kick), Drive: 5 plays, 71 yards, 2:07	7–7
1	02:51	Virginia	Taquan Mizzell 44-yard run (Sam Hayward kick), Drive: 8 plays, 75 yards, 2:50	7–14
1	02:35	Pittsburgh	Quadree Henderson 93-yard kickoff return (Chris Blewitt kick), Drive: 0 plays, 0 yards, 0:00	14–14
1	01:48	Virginia	Olamide Zaccheaus 74-yard pass from Kurt Benkert (Sam Hayward kick), Drive: 2 plays, 78 yards, 0:47	14–21
2	09:08	Pittsburgh	James Conner 1-yard run (Chris Blewitt kick), Drive: 10 plays, 74 yards, 5:32	21–21
2	05:57	Virginia	Albert Reid 1-yard run (Sam Hayward kick), Drive: 8 plays, 74 yards, 3:11	21–28
2	00:40	Pittsburgh	James Conner 1-yard run (Chris Blewitt kick), Drive: 9 plays, 26 yards, 5:17	28–28
2	00:04	Pittsburgh	Jordan Whitehead 59-yard interception return (Chris Blewitt kick), Drive: 4 plays, 12 yards, 0:36	35–28
4	09:47	Pittsburgh	George Aston 5-yard pass from Nathan Peterman (Chris Blewitt kick), Drive: 8 plays, 81 yards, 3:55	42–28
4	03:21	Pittsburgh	Chris Blewitt 25-yard field goal, Drive: 8 plays, 33 yards, 2:47	45–28
4	02:04	Virginia	Sam Hayward 36-yard field goal, Drive: 10 plays, 57 yards, 1:17	45–31

It was only one play in a game unfolding as a track meet, and it changed the game entirely. Jordan Whitehead, deep in coverage as Virginia was trying to push the issue and sneak in more points before halftime, stepped in front of Kurt Benkert's pass at the Panthers' 41 and never stopped running until Pittsburgh took a 35–28 lead over Virginia into halftime. "It was gigantic. It was gigantic," Panthers coach Pat Narduzzi said after the Panthers won 45–31 Saturday. "We've been waiting for one of those picks in that coverage and we finally got one. ... Tremendous football play by him and then he finds a way to get it in the end zone." The play capped a wild half that saw the teams combine for three touchdowns in one span of 63 seconds on a 44-yard scoring run by Virginia's Taquan Mizzell, a 93-yard kickoff return by Quadree Henderson and Benkert's 74-yard strike to Olamide Zaccheaus. But it left Cavaliers offensive coordinator Robert Anae accepting the blame for getting greedy in the final 33 seconds of the half. The drive began with 12-yard run by Mizzell to move the ball to the Cavaliers' 44. After a spike to stop the clock, Virginia had a receiver wide open on the next play, but Benkert was scrambling, so Anae called exactly the same play, hoping the same opportunity would develop. "It completely backfired on us," Anae said. "That was my fault all the way. I blew the call and put our quarterback in a bad situation." James Conner ran for 90 yards and two touchdowns and Pittsburgh shut Virginia down in the second half.

The Panthers (5–2, 2–1 ACC) held the Cavaliers without a completion in a scoreless third quarter, outgaining them 80–15, and limited them to 108 yards and a 36-yard field goal by Sam Hayward with 2:04 remaining. It was Hayward's first career 3-pointer. Virginia (2–4, 1–1 ACC) had its two-game winning streak end. Nathan Peterman threw two touchdown passes for Panthers, the last on a shovel pass to George Aston making it 42–28 with 9:47 left. The Panthers have scored at least 36 points in six consecutive games, a program record, so offense isn't a problem. Their run defense is statistically solid, but might be artificially so because its pass defense is spotty. Kurt Benkert thrived in the first half, when Pitt had no sacks, but the Cavaliers quarterback seemed rattled after the Panthers sacked him three times in four plays early after halftime. Whitehead isn't Pittsburgh's only two-way player anymore. The safety, who also carried the ball three times for 28 yards, was joined in that versatility by Conner, who took a few snaps at defensive end. "We've been kind of working that in and as you guys know, he was recruited as a defensive lineman," Narduzzi said. "... James is a super football player. I was happy he got a hurry on the quarterback and we'll have a little bit more of that." The Panthers have a bye next weekend, and will then play Virginia Tech at Heinz Field on Thursday night.

=== Virginia Tech ===
Virginia Tech at Pittsburgh

Team	1	2	3	4	Total
• #25 Hokies	6	10	13	10	39
Panthers	0	14	7	15	36

- Date: October 27
- Location:
  Heinz Field
  Pittsburgh, PA
- Game start: 7:00 p.m. EDT
- Elapsed time: 3:32
- Game attendance: 40,254
- Game weather: 52 °F (11 °C) • Wind NW 7 mph (11 km/h) • Cloudy
- Referee: Riley Johnson
- TV announcers (ESPN):
  Play-by-Play: Dave Flemming
  Analyst: Jesse Palmer

Scoring summary
1	11:05	Virginia Tech	Joey Slye 31-yard field goal, Drive: 10 plays, 76 yards, 4:01	0–3
1	08:05	Virginia Tech	Joey Slye 21-yard field goal, Drive: 7 plays, 15 yards, 2:54	0–6
2	13:08	Virginia Tech	Joey Slye 22-yard field goal, Drive: 9 plays, 46 yards, 4:05	0–9
2	04:14	Pittsburgh	James Conner 6-yard run (Chris Blewitt kick), Drive: 8 plays, 84 yards, 4:01	7–9
2	02:00	Virginia Tech	Chris Cunningham 11-yard pass from Jerod Evans (Joey Slye kick), Drive: 7 plays, 76 yards, 2:14	7–16
2	00:14	Pittsburgh	James Conner 1-yard run (Chris Blewitt kick), Drive: 5 plays, 81 yards, 1:46	14–16
3	11:27	Pittsburgh	James Conner 1-yard run (Chris Blewitt kick), Drive: 7 plays, 75 yards, 3:33	21–16
3	07:00	Virginia Tech	Joey Slye 26-yard field goal, Drive: 12 plays, 70 yards, 4:27	21–19
3	02:44	Virginia Tech	Joey Slye 37-yard field goal, Drive: 7 plays, 50 yards, 2:03	21–22
3	00:07	Virginia Tech	Marshawn Williams 2-yard run (Joey Slye kick), Drive: 5 plays, 68 yards, 1:37	21–29
4	13:25	Pittsburgh	Brian O'Neill 5-yard run (Nathan Peterman pass to James Conner for two-point conv.), Drive: 4 plays, 75 yards, 1:42	29–29
4	09:39	Virginia Tech	Joey Slye 22 yard field goal, Drive: 10 plays, 70 yards, 3:46	36–29
4	07:20	Virginia Tech	Isaiah Ford 16 yard pass from Jerod Evans (Joey Slye kick), Drive: 3 plays, 57 yards, 0:31	39–29
4	02:31	Pittsburgh	Jester Weah 7 yard pass from Nathan Peterman (Chris Blewitt kick), Drive: 7 plays, 90 yards, 1:32	39–36

=== At Miami (FL) ===
Pittsburgh at Miami (FL)

Team	1	2	3	4	Total
Panthers	7	14	0	7	28
• Hurricanes	17	10	7	17	51

- Date: November 5
- Location:
  Hard Rock Stadium
  Miami Gardens, FL
- Game start: 12:30 p.m. EDT
- Elapsed time: 3:34
- Game attendance: 51,796
- Game weather: 79 °F (26 °C) • Wind 12 mph (19 km/h) • Light rain
- Referee: Gary Patterson
- TV announcers (ACCN):
  Play-by-Play: Evan Lepler
  Analyst: Takeo Spikes

Scoring summary
1	12:46	Miami (FL)	David Njoku 12 yard pass from Brad Kaaya (Michael Badgley kick), Drive: 6 plays, 75 yards, 2:14	0–7
1	12:30	Pittsburgh	Quadree Henderson 100 yard kickoff return (Chris Blewitt kick), Drive: 0 plays, 0 yards, 0:00	7–7
1	07:33	Miami (FL)	Stacy Coley 1 yard pass from Brad Kaaya (Michael Badgley kick), Drive: 11 plays, 77 yards, 4:57	7–14
1	02:26	Miami (FL)	Michael Badgley 46 yard field goal, Drive: 10 plays, 23 yards, 3:18	7–17
2	13:44	Pittsburgh	James Conner 12 yard run (Chris Blewitt kick), Drive: 10 plays, 75 yards, 3:42	14–17
2	11:18	Miami (FL)	Michael Badgley 48 yard field goal, Drive: 7 plays, 35 yards, 2:26	14–20
2	08:45	Pittsburgh	George Aston 23 yard pass from Nathan Peterman (Chris Blewitt kick), Drive: 6 plays, 75 yards, 2:33	21–20
2	06:05	Miami (FL)	Brad Kaaya 1 yard run (Michael Badgley kick), Drive: 10 plays, 71 yards, 2:40	21–27
3	13:33	Miami (FL)	Stacy Coley 3 yard pass from Brad Kaaya (Michael Badgley kick), Drive: 3 plays, 8 yards, 0:43	21–34
4	13:38	Miami (FL)	David Njoku 5 yard pass from Brad Kaaya (Michael Badgley kick), Drive: 10 plays, 75 yards, 3:49	21–41
4	13:27	Pittsburgh	Jester Weah 75 yard pass from Nathan Peterman (Chris Blewitt kick), Drive: 1 play, 75 yards, 0:11	28–41
4	03:21	Miami (FL)	Michael Badgley 25 yard field goal, Drive: 8 plays, 41 yards, 4:54	28–44
4	02:12	Miami (FL)	Mark Walton 55 yard run (Michael Badgley kick), Drive: 3 plays, 62 yards, 0:28	28–51

=== At Clemson ===
Pittsburgh at Clemson

Team	1	2	3	4	Total
• Panthers	14	13	7	9	43
#3 Tigers	14	14	14	0	42

- Date: November 12
- Location:
  Memorial Stadium
  Clemson, SC
- Game start: 3:30 p.m. EST
- Elapsed time: 3:50
- Game attendance: 81,048
- Game weather: 63 °F (17 °C) • Wind E 6 mph (9.7 km/h) • Clear
- Referee: Duane Heydt
- TV announcers (ABC):
  Play-by-Play: Steve Levy
  Analyst: Brian Griese

Scoring summary
1	13:08	Pittsburgh	George Aston 15-yard pass from Nathan Peterman (Chris Blewitt kick), Drive: 5 plays, 75 yards, 1:52	7–0
1	07:19	Clemson	Wayne Gallman 1-yard run (Greg Huegel kick), Drive: 6 plays, 51 yards, 1:53	7–7
1	05:28	Pittsburgh	James Conner 46-yard pass from Nathan Peterman (Chris Blewitt kick), Drive: 5 plays, 75 yards, 1:51	14–7
1	00:40	Clemson	Wayne Gallman 1-yard run (Greg Huegel kick), Drive: 12 plays, 70 yards, 4:48	14–14
2	10:06	Clemson	Mike Williams 15-yard pass from Deshaun Watson (Greg Huegel kick), Drive: 11 plays, 80 yards, 3:42	14–21
2	09:33	Pittsburgh	Scott Orndoff 55-yard pass from Nathan Peterman (Chris Blewitt PAT failed), Drive: 3 plays, 65 yards, 0:33	20–21
2	02:23	Pittsburgh	George Aston 1-yard pass from Nathan Peterman (Chris Blewitt kick), Drive: 10 plays, 86 yards, 4:17	27–21
2	01:09	Clemson	Artavis Scott 13-yard pass from Deshaun Watson (Greg Huegel kick), Drive: 6 plays, 75 yards, 1:14	27–28
3	09:53	Clemson	Deon Cain 27-yard pass from Deshaun Watson (Greg Huegel kick), Drive: 3 plays, 47 yards, 0:55	27–35
3	04:35	Pittsburgh	Scott Orndoff 7-yard pass from Nathan Peterman (Chris Blewitt kick), Drive: 11 plays, 75 yards, 5:18	34–35
3	01:37	Clemson	Wayne Gallman 1-yard run (Greg Huegel kick), Drive: 8 plays, 81 yards, 2:58	34–42
4	05:17	Pittsburgh	James Conner 20-yard run (two-point pass conv. failed), Drive: 3 plays, 30 yards, 0:25	40–42
4	00:06	Pittsburgh	Chris Blewitt 48-yard field goal, Drive: 6 plays, 34 yards, 0:52	43–42

Pittsburgh was happy to once again shuffle up the national championship picture. "Hey, sorry to do that. But we wanted this one bad," said Conner, who had two touchdowns and ran for 132 yards in the Panthers' 43–42 stunner over No. 2 Clemson on Saturday. Conner's 20 yard TD run with 5:17 left inched the Panthers into striking range and Chris Blewitt, after a kiss on the cheek from coach Pat Narduzzi, struck a perfect 48 yard field goal with six seconds left for the winning points. "We'll remember this one forever," Conner said. So, too, will Clemson (9–1, 6–1 Atlantic Coast Conference, No. 3 AP) which saw its run at perfection halted after escaping so many other jams this season. A fourth-down stop a yard shy saved the Tigers' 42–36 win over Louisville on Oct. 1. North Carolina State's missed field goal at the end of regulation boosted Clemson to a 24–17 overtime win. This time, it was the Panthers (6–4, 3–3) who made the critical plays. When Clemson was driving for a touchdown already up 42–34, linebacker Saleem Brightwell picked off quarterback Deshaun Watson, his third interception and returned it 70 yards to set up a 20-yard TD by Conner that drew Pitt within 42–40. When Clemson attempted to run out the clock, the Panthers defense (despite allowing 630 yards) stuffed Wayne Gallman a yard short on third and fourth downs to take over near midfield with 58 seconds left. "We had a chance to put the game away and they stopped us," Clemson coach Dabo Swinney said. "We had been making those kinds of plays this year."

Nathan Peterman moved Pitt to the Clemson 30 and Blewitt steadily knocked through. It was Pitt's highest-ranked win since defeating Backyard Brawl rival, No. 2 West Virginia, 13–9 in 2007 and spoiling the Mountaineers' chances at playing for the national title. "Our team had a lot of guts tonight," Narduzzi said. And a whole lot of playmakers to topple the defending ACC champs. Peterman had a career-best five TD passes and 308 yards. Conner rushed for 132 yards and a touchdown. He also caught one of Peterman's scoring throws. Blewitt, who had a kick blocked at the end of the opening half, was steely-eyed and ready. Narduzzi gave his senior a kiss on the cheek and sent him out for the winning kick. "As soon as I saw the kick go up, I knew it was going in," Scott Orndoff said. "It was jubilation." Clemson had its offense going. Watson threw for an ACC record 580 yards and three touchdowns. Gallman ran for three TDs and Mike Williams had 15 catches for 202 yards and a touchdown. In the end, it was Clemson's first loss to an unranked opponent in five seasons, a span of 46 games. "Come Monday, we'll start over because it's a long season," Watson said. "Get ready for Wake Forest. Hopefully, we can clinch the ACC (Atlantic) and punch our ticket" for the championship game next week.

=== Duke ===
Duke at Pittsburgh

Team	1	2	3	4	Total
Blue Devils	7	7	0	0	14
• Panthers	14	14	14	14	56

- Date: November 19
- Location:
  Heinz Field
  Pittsburgh, PA
- Game start: 3:00 p.m. EST
- Elapsed time: 3:01
- Game attendance: 35,425
- Game weather: 38 °F (3 °C) • Wind W 7 mph (11 km/h) • Cloudy and cool
- Referee: Jeff Maconaghy
- TV announcers (ACCRSN/RTPT):
  Play-by-Play: Wes Durham
  Analyst: James Bates

Scoring summary
1	13:33	Pittsburgh	Dontez Ford 16-yard pass from Nathan Peterman (Chris Blewitt kick), Drive: 3 plays, 17 yards, 0:54	7–0
1	11:11	Duke	Chris Taylor 6-yard pass from Daniel Jones (AJ Reed kick), Drive: 5 plays, 59 yards, 2:22	7–7
1	07:33	Pittsburgh	James Conner 1-yard run (Chris Blewitt kick), Drive: 8 plays, 64 yards, 3:38	14–7
2	14:08	Pittsburgh	Quadree Henderson 52-yard run (Chris Blewitt kick), Drive: 2 plays, 56 yards, 0:46	21–7
2	05:34	Duke	Bryon Fields 36-yard interception return (AJ Reed kick), Drive: 3 plays, 11 yards, 1:13	21–14
2	02:17	Pittsburgh	Jester Weah 56-yard pass from Nathan Peterman (Chris Blewitt kick), Drive: 6 plays, 75 yards, 3:17	28–14
3	12:04	Pittsburgh	James Conner 1-yard run (Chris Blewitt kick), Drive: 5 plays, 71 yards, 2:56	35–14
3	11:01	Pittsburgh	Quadree Henderson 65-yard punt return (Chris Blewitt kick), Drive: 3 plays, 0 yards, 1:03	42–14
4	09:01	Pittsburgh	Scott Orndoff 48-yard pass from Nathan Peterman (Chris Blewitt kick), Drive: 5 plays, 66 yards, 2:52	49–14
4	05:06	Pittsburgh	Qadree Ollison 2-yard run (Chris Blewitt kick), Drive: 7 plays, 25 yards, 3:45	56–14

=== Syracuse ===
Syracuse at Pittsburgh

Team	1	2	3	4	Total
Orange	14	7	13	27	61
• Panthers	14	21	21	20	76

- Date: November 26
- Location:
  Heinz Field
  Pittsburgh, PA
- Game start: 12:30 p.m. EST
- Elapsed time: 3:43
- Game attendance: 34,049
- Game weather: 38 °F (3 °C) • Wind W 13 mph (21 km/h) • Cloudy with showers
- Referee: Jeff Heaser
- TV announcers (ACCN/WTAE-TV):
  Play-by-Play: Tom Werme
  Analyst: Dave Archer

Scoring summary
1	07:42	Syracuse	Zack Mahoney 2-yard run (Cole Murphy kick), Drive: 7 plays, 45 yards, 2:13	0–7
1	06:29	Pittsburgh	Jester Weah 59-yard pass from Nathan Peterman (Chris Blewitt kick), Drive: 13 plays, 65 yards, 1:13	7–7
1	03:35	Pittsburgh	James Conner 35-yard pass from Nathan Peterman (Chris Blewitt kick), Drive: 1 play, 35 yards, 0:08	14–7
1	00:28	Syracuse	Dontae Strickland 5-yard run (Cole Murphy kick), Drive: 10 plays, 74 yards, 3:07	14–14
2	10:36	Pittsburgh	George Aston 6-yard run (Chris Blewitt kick), Drive: 10 plays, 65 yards, 4:52	21–14
2	06:57	Pittsburgh	James Conner 9-yard run (Chris Blewitt kick), Drive: 4 plays, 69 yards, 1:40	28–14
2	01:36	Syracuse	Amba Etta-Tawo 5-yard pass from Zack Mahoney (Cole Murphy kick), Drive: 14 plays, 68 yards, 5:21	28–21
2	00:10	Pittsburgh	Nathan Peterman 13-yard run (Chris Blewitt kick), Drive: 8 plays, 64 yards, 1:26	35–21
3	11:37	Pittsburgh	Dane Jackson 20-yard interception return (Chris Blewitt kick), Drive: 3 plays, 5 yards, 1:03	42–21
3	08:59	Pittsburgh	Quadree Henderson 66-yard run (Chris Blewitt kick), Drive: 1 play, 66 yards, 0:11	49–21
3	07:54	Syracuse	Moe Neal 42-yard run (Cole Murphy PAT blocked), Drive: 4 plays, 85 yards, 1:05	49–27
3	07:30	Pittsburgh	Maurice Ffrench 77-yard run (Chris Blewitt Kick), Drive: 1 play, 77 yards, 0:24	56–27
3	01:53	Syracuse	Amba Etta-Tawo 12-yard pass from Zack Mahoney (Cole Murphy kick), Drive: 6 plays, 45 yards, 2:03	56–34
4	11:16	Syracuse	Zack Mahoney 19-yard run (Cole Murphy kick), Drive: 7 plays, 63 yards, 2:11	56–41
4	09:33	Pittsburgh	Dontez Ford 79-yard pass from Nathan Peterman (Chris Blewitt kick), Drive: 3 plays, 78 yards, 1:43	63–41
4	07:21	Syracuse	Amba Etta-Tawo 7-yard pass from Zack Mahoney (Cole Murphy kick), Drive: 7 plays, 65 yards, 2:12	63–48
4	05:06	Pittsburgh	Jester Weah 6-yard pass from Nathan Peterman (Chris Blewitt kick), Drive: 5 plays, 44 yards, 2:15	70–48
4	03:47	Syracuse	Amba Etta-Tawo 49-yard pass from Zack Mahoney (Cole Murphy kick), Drive: 5 plays, 69 yards, 1:19	70–55
4	03:15	Pittsburgh	James Conner 1-yard run (Chris Blewitt PAT failed), Drive: 2 plays, 43 yards, 0:32	76–55
4	00:58	Syracuse	Amba Etta-Tawo 13-yard pass from Zack Mahoney (Cole Murphy PAT failed), Drive: 10 plays, 77 yards, 2:17	76–61

The Panthers would play rival Syracuse in their season finale in a wild shootout at home. James Conner would rush for 115 yards with 2 TDs, while Nathan Peterman would only complete 9 passes, but 4 of them would go for touchdowns to go along with 251 passing yards and 1 rushing touchdown. Jester Weah finished the game with 4 reception for 99 yards and 2 TDs. Syracuse QB Zack Mahoney would complete 43 of 61 passes for 440 yards and 5 TDs, targeting a Pitt secondary that had been susceptible to giving up big plays all year; all 5 of his touchdown passes were caught by Senior WR Amba Etta-Tawo who, along with the 5 TD receptions, would finish with 13 total receptions with 178 yards receiving.

The two teams combined 1,312 yards and 137 points, breaking the record for most combined points in a game. The previous record was set by Navy and North Texas during a November 10, 2007 meeting between the two teams in which they combined for 136 points. The 76 points surrendered by the Syracuse defense was also the most points given up in program history.

=== Northwestern (Pinstripe Bowl) ===
Pittsburgh vs Northwestern

Team	1	2	3	4	Total
#22 Panthers	3	7	7	7	24
• Wildcats	0	14	7	10	31

- Date: December 28
- Location:
  Yankee Stadium
  Bronx, NY
- Game start: 2:00 p.m. EST
- Elapsed time: 3:34
- Game attendance: 37,918
- Game weather: 42 °F (6 °C) • Wind WNW 17 mph (27 km/h) • Mostly Cloudy
- Referee: Dan Romeo
- TV announcers (ESPN):
  Play-by-Play: Ryan Ruocco
  Analyst: Mike Golic

Scoring summary
1	11:53	Pittsburgh	Chris Blewitt 46-yard field goal, Drive: 5 plays, 30 yards, 1:14	3–0
2	14:31	Northwestern	Justin Jackson 8-yard run (Jack Mitchell kick), Drive: 10 plays, 99 yards, 4:19	3–7
2	3:08	Northwestern	Justin Jackson 16-yard run (Jack Mitchell kick), Drive: 8 plays, 74 yards, 2:35	3–14
2	2:51	Pittsburgh	Jester Weah 69-yard pass from Nathan Peterman (Chris Blewitt kick), Drive: 1 play, 69 yards, 0:11	10–14
3	13:13	Pittsburgh	Nathan Peterman 5-yard run (Chris Blewett kick), Drive: 4 plays, 68 yards, 1:46	17–14
3	7:47	Northwestern	Justin Jackson 40-yard run (Jack Mitchell kick), Drive: 14 plays, 89 yards, 5:18	17–21
4	13:15	Pittsburgh	George Aston 6-yard pass from Ben DiNucci (Chris Blewitt kick), Drive: 6 plays, 22 yards, 3:20	24–21
4	8:23	Northwestern	Garrett Dickerson 21-yard pass from Clayton Thorson (Jack Mitchell kick), Drive: 14 plays, 76 yards, 4:44	24–28
4	6:17	Northwestern	Jack Mitchell 37-yard field goal, Drive: 5 plays, 9 yards, 1:57	24–31

== Roster ==
2016 Pittsburgh Panthers football roster
Quarterback: 3 Ben DiNucci – (redshirt) freshman (6'2, 215); 4 Nathan Peterman – senior (6'2, 225); 7 Thomas MacVittie – freshman (6'5, 225); 8 Manny Stocker – senior (6'2, 215); 12 Bo Schneider – sophomore (6'3, 225); Tailback: 22 Darrin Hall – sophomore (5'11, 225); 24 James Conner – junior (6'2, 235); 26 Chawntez Moss – freshman (5'11, 210); 29 Rachid Ibrahim – junior (6'1, 195); 36 Shawn Wood – freshman (6'0, 210); 37 Qadree Ollison – (redshirt) sophomore (6'2, 230); 39 Kyle Vreen – freshman (5'10, 180); Fullback: 35 George Aston – (redshirt) sophomore (6'0, 245); 40 Colton Lively – junior (6'0, 240); Wide receiver: 2 Maurice Ffrench – freshman (5'11, 185); 5 Tre Tipton – (redshirt) freshman (6'0, 190); 6 Aaron Mathews – freshman (6'4, 195); 10 Quadree Henderson – sophomore (5'8, 190); 11 Ruben Flowers III – freshman (6'3,190); 19 Dontez Ford – senior (6'2, 210); 48 Kellen McAlone – (redshirt) sophomore (6'2, 205); 80 Zach Challingsworth – junior (6'2, 195); 82 Rafael Araujo-Lopes – (redshirt) Soph. (5'9, 185); 85 Jester Weah – junior (6'3,210); Tight end: 31 Jaymar Parrish – senior (6'2, 260); 45 Devon Edwards – junior (6'4, 255); 81 Nathan Bossory – junior (6'3, 235); 83 Scott Orndoff – senior (6'5, 255); 84 Zach Poker – junior (6'4, 240); 87 Chris Clark – sophomore (6'6, 255); 98 DeAndre Schifino – (redshirt) freshman (6'2, 235)	Offensive lineman: 50 Mike Grimm – OL – (redshirt) sophomore (6’6, 320); 53 Dorian Johnson – OG – senior (6’5, 315); 55 Jaryd Jones-Smith – OT – junior (6’7, 325); 56 Brandon Ford – OL – freshman (6’5, 300); 59 Tony Pilato – OL – (redshirt) freshman (6’5, 320); 60 Aaron Reese – OT – junior (6’5, 310); 62 John Guy – OG – senior (6’7, 310); 63 Alex Officer – C – junior (6’4, 335); 64 Aaron Britton – OL – (redshirt) freshman (6’5, 280); 67 Jimmy Morrissey – OL – freshman (6’3, 295); 68 Kyle Benbrook – OL – (redshirt) freshman (6’3, 295); 69 Adam Bisnowaty – OT – senior (6’6, 305); 70 Brian O'Neill – OT – (redshirt) sophomore (6’6, 300); 71 Bryce Hargrove – OL – freshman (6’4, 300); 72 Carson Baker – OG – junior (6’5, 320); 76 Connor Dintino – C – (redshirt) sophomore (6’3, 310); 77 Justin Morgan – OL – freshman (6’6, 365); 77 Alex Galiyas – OL – (redshirt) sophomore (6’2, 290); 78 Alex Bookser – OG – (redshirt) sophomore (6’6, 315); Defensive line: 5 Ejuan Price – DE – senior (6’0, 255); 6 Tyrique Jarrett – NT – senior (6’3, 335); 8 Dewayne Hendrix – DE – sophomore (6’4, 260); 10 Keyshon Camp – DT – freshman (6’4, 275); 17 Rashad Weaver – DL – freshman (6’5, 255); 34 Amir Watts – DT – freshman (6’3, 270); 40 James Folston Jr. – DE – (redshirt) sophomore (6’3, 245); 52 Shakir Soto – DT – senior (6’3, 290); 66 Mike Herndon – NT – (redshirt) sophomore (6’4, 315); 70 Calvin Hamilton – DL – (redshirt) freshman (6’0, 315); 90 Rashad Wheeler – DL – freshman (6’3, 290); 91 Patrick Jones II – DL – freshman (6’5, 250); 92 Rori Blair – DE – junior (6’4, 245); 93 Shane Roy – NT – (redshirt) sophomore (6’4, 280); 94 Jeremiah Taleni – DL – junior (6’2, 290); 95 Zack Gilbert – DL – freshman (6’1, 240); 96 Allen Edwards – DE – junior (6’4, 245)	Linebacker: 4 Bam Bradley – senior (6’2, 220); 25 Elijah Zeise – (redshirt) sophomore (6’2, 225); 27 Nico Lodovico – junior (6’1, 230); 28 Anthony McKee Jr. – (redshirt) freshman (6’2, 210); 29 Oluwaseun Idowu – (redshirt) sophomore (6’0, 215); 30 Mike Caprara – senior (6’0, 225); 31 Kaezon Pugh – freshman (6’1, 210); 36 Chase Pine – freshman (6’2, 220); 37 Erik Sellers – (redshirt) freshman (6’1, 230); 39 Saleem Brightwell – (redshirt) freshman (6’0, 210); 41 Jalen Williams – (redshirt) sophomore (6’2, 215); 44 Elias Reynolds – freshman (6’2, 225); 47 Matt Galambos – senior (6’2, 245); 50 Dom Cuono – (redshirt) sophomore (6’2, 235); 51 Jim Medure – (redshirt) freshman (6’2, 220); 53 Brian Popp – (redshirt) sophomore (6'0, 235); 58 Quintin Wirginis – junior (6'2, 240); Defensive backs: 2 Terrish Webb – FS – senior (5’11, 195); 3 Damar Hamlin – DB – freshman (6’1, 185); 7 Henry Miller – DB – freshman (6’3, 205); 9 Jordan Whitehead – SS – sophomore (5’11, 190); 11 Dane Jackson – CB – (redshirt) freshman (6’0, 180); 14 Avonte Maddox – CB – junior (5’9, 175); 15 Reggie Mitchell – FS – senior (6’0, 200); 16 Therran Coleman – DB – freshman (6’0, 190); 20 Dennis Briggs – SS – (redshirt) sophomore (5’10, 190); 21 Malik Henderson – DB – (redshirt) freshman (6’0, 185); 24 Phil Campbell – DB – freshman (6’1, 195); 27 Bricen Garner – DB – freshman (6’1, 175); 32 Phillipie Motley – CB – (redshirt) sophomore (5’10, 175); 34 Mark Bernsdorff – DB – junior (5’11, 185); 35 Rob Boatright – DB – junior (5’10, 185); 38 Ryan Lewis – CB – senior (6’0, 200); 46 Rimoni Dorsey – DB – (redshirt) (6’0, 190); Specialists: 12 Chris Blewitt – K – senior (5'9, 195); 18 Ryan Winslow – P – junior (6'5, 210); 45 Nick Goldsmith – P – (redshirt) sophomore (6'2, 210); 55 Conrad Blake – LS – freshman (6'0, 230); 57 Jake Knight – LS – (redshirt) freshman (6'3, 225); 61 Pat Quirin – LS – senior (6'1, 230); 97 Alex Kessman – K – freshman (6'3, 180)

== Rankings ==
Ranking movements Legend: ██ Increase in ranking ██ Decrease in ranking — = Not ranked RV = Received votes
	Week															
Poll	Pre	1	2	3	4	5	6	7	8	9	10	11	12	13	14	Final
AP	RV	RV	RV	—	—	—	—	RV	RV	—	—	RV	RV	24	22	RV
Coaches	RV	RV	RV	—	—	—	RV	RV	RV	RV	—	RV	RV	RV	RV	—
CFP	Not released									—	—	—	—	25	23	Not released

== Coaching staff ==
2016 Pittsburgh Panthers football staff
Coaching staff: Pat Narduzzi – head coach; Matt Canada – Offensive coordinator/quarterbacks; Josh Conklin – Defensive coordinator; Andre Powell – Running backs/special teams; Tom Sims – Defensive line; John Peterson – Offensive line; Renaldo Hill – Cornerbacks; Tim Salem – Tight ends; Kevin Sherman – Wide receivers; Rob Harley – Linebackers	Support staff: Chris Lasala – Associate Athletic Director/football operations; Bob Junko – Director of player development and High School Relations; Ben Mathers – Director of football operations; Mark Diethorn – Director of Recruiting; Dave Bucar – Offensive graduate assistant; Dan Gerberry – Offensive graduate assistant; Rob Greene – Defensive graduate assistant; Phil Decapito – Defensive graduate assistant	Strength and conditioning staff: Dave Andrews – Head Strength and Conditioning Coach; Freddie Walker – Associate Strength and Conditioning Coach; Austin Addington-Strapp – Assistant strength and conditioning coach

== Records ==
- 69,983 fans attended the Pitt-Penn State game making it the largest attended sporting event.
- Pitt's 76–61 victory over Syracuse set a new record for most combined points (137).

== Team players drafted into the NFL ==
Player	Position	Round	Pick	NFL club
James Conner	Running back	3	105	Pittsburgh Steelers
Dorian Johnson	Guard	4	115	Arizona Cardinals
Nathan Peterman	Quarterback	5	171	Buffalo Bills
Adam Bisnowaty	Offensive Tackle	6	200	New York Giants
Ejuan Price	Linebacker	7	234	Los Angeles Rams
