= 2016 Pinstripe Bowl =

2016 New Era Pinstripe Bowl
- 7th Pinstripe Bowl
Pittsburgh Panthers	Northwestern Wildcats
(8–4)	(6–6)
ACC	Big Ten
24	31
Head coach: Pat Narduzzi	Head coach: Pat Fitzgerald
AP / CFP; 22 / 23
	1	2	3	4	Total
Pittsburgh	3	7	7	7	24
Northwestern	0	14	7	10	31
- Date: December 28, 2016
- Season: 2016
- Stadium: Yankee Stadium
- Location: Bronx, New York
- MVP: Northwestern RB Justin Jackson
- Favorite: Pitt by 5
- Referee: Dan Romeo (Big 12)
- Attendance: 37,918
- Payout: US$2,000,000

United States TV coverage
- Network: ESPN/ESPN Radio
- Announcers: TV: Ryan Ruocco, Mike Golic, Mike Golic Jr, Paul Caracaterra, Radio: Kevin Winter, Jack Ford, CJ Papa

The 2016 Pinstripe Bowl was a post-season American college football bowl game played on December 28, 2016 at Yankee Stadium in the New York City borough of the Bronx. The seventh edition of the Pinstripe Bowl featured the Pittsburgh Panthers of the Atlantic Coast Conference against the Northwestern Wildcats of the Big Ten Conference. It was one of the 2016–17 bowl games that concluded the 2016 FBS football season. Sponsored by the New Era Cap Company, the game was officially known as the New Era Pinstripe Bowl.

== Teams selected ==
The game featured conference tie-ins from the Atlantic Coast Conference and the Big Ten Conference.

This was the seventh meeting between the schools, with the series previously tied at 3–3. The previous meeting of the two teams was on September 29, 1973, where the Panthers defeated the Wildcats by a score of 21–14.

== Game summary ==
=== Box score ===
	1	2	3	4	Total
Panthers	3	7	7	7	24
Wildcats	0	14	7	10	31

=== Scoring summary ===
Scoring summary

Quarter	Time	Drive			Team	Scoring information	Score	
Quarter	Time	Plays	Yards	TOP	Team	Scoring information	PITT	NU
1	11:53	5	30	1:14	PITT	46-yard field goal by Chris Blewitt	3	0
2	14:31	10	99	4:19	NU	Justin Jackson 8-yard touchdown run, Jack Mitchell kick good	3	7
2	3:08	8	74	2:35	NU	Justin Jackson 16-yard touchdown run, Jack Mitchell kick good	3	14
2	2:51	1	69	0:11	PITT	Jester Weah 69-yard touchdown reception from Nathan Peterman, Chris Blewitt kick good	10	14
3	13:13	4	68	1:46	PITT	Nathan Peterman 5-yard touchdown run, Chris Blewitt kick good	17	14
3	7:47	14	89	5:18	NU	Justin Jackson 40-yard touchdown run, Jack Mitchell kick good	17	21
4	13:15	6	22	3:20	PITT	George Aston 6-yard touchdown reception from Ben DiNucci, Chris Blewitt kick good	24	21
4	8:23	14	76	4:44	NU	Garrett Dickerson 21-yard touchdown reception from Clayton Thorson, Jack Mitchell kick good	24	28
4	6:17	5	9	1:57	NU	37-yard field goal by Jack Mitchell	24	31
"TOP" = time of possession. For other American football terms, see Glossary of American football.							24	31

=== Statistics ===
Statistics	PITT	NU
First downs	18	27
Plays–yards	61–438	86–462
Rushes–yards	32–169 (5.3)	50–248 (5.0)
Passing yards	269	214
Passing: comp–att–int	16–29–3	23–36–1
Turnovers		
Time of possession	24:38	35:22

Team	Category	Player	Statistics
PITT	Passing	Nathan Peterman	13/18, 1 TD, 1 INT
PITT	Rushing	Quadree Henderson	6 car, 76 yds
PITT	Receiving	Dontez Ford	3 rec, 53 yds
NU	Passing	Clayton Thorson	23/36, 1 TD, 1 INT
NU	Rushing	Justin Jackson	32 car, 224 yds, 3 TD
NU	Receiving	Austin Carr	6 rec, 51 yds
