= Jester Weah =

American football player (born 1995)

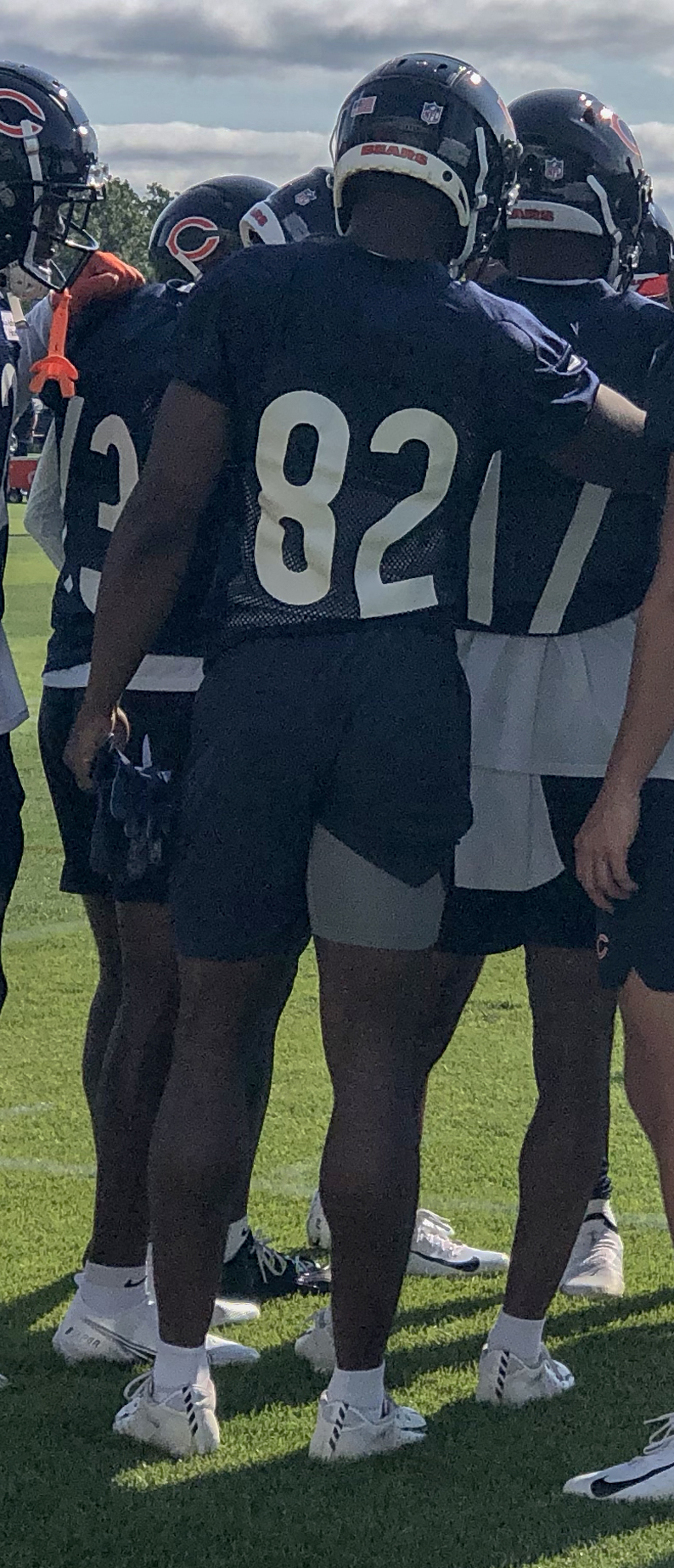
- Weah at Chicago Bears training camp in 2021

No. 19
- Position: Wide receiver

Personal information
- Born: February 7, 1995 (age 31); Minneapolis, Minnesota, U.S.
- Listed height: 6 ft 3 in (1.91 m)
- Listed weight: 209 lb (95 kg)

Career information
- High school: James Madison Memorial (Madison, Wisconsin)
- College: Pittsburgh
- NFL draft: 2018: undrafted

Career history
- Houston Texans (2018–2019)*; Washington Redskins / Football Team (2019); Chicago Bears (2021)*; Saskatchewan Roughriders (2022)
- * Offseason or practice squad member only

Career CFL statistics
- Receptions: 2
- Receiving yards: 9
- Stats at CFL.ca
- Stats at Pro Football Reference

Jester Weah (born February 7, 1995) is an American former professional football wide receiver. He played college football at Pittsburgh and was signed by the Houston Texans as an undrafted free agent in 2018.

== Early life ==
At James Madison Memorial High School in Madison, Wisconsin, Weah played for the football, basketball, and track teams. Weah did not play organized football until his sophomore season. Across his junior and senior seasons, Weah caught 71 passes for 1,436 yards and 13 touchdowns. After his senior season, Weah was named to the all-state teams by the Wisconsin Football Coaches Association and the Associated Press. Rivals and Scout both ranked Weah as the No. 2 wide receiver in Wisconsin.

Weah was a consensus three-star prospect, and received offers from nine schools, including Colorado State, Wyoming, Ohio, and Pitt. Weah committed to Pitt in January 2013, signed his letter of intent during the signing period in February, and enrolled in June.

College recruiting
Name	Hometown	School	Height	Weight	Commit date
Jester Weah; WR	Madison, Wisconsin	James Madison Memorial High School	6 ft 3 in (1.91 m)	190 lb (86 kg)	Jan 25, 2013
Jester Weah; WR	Recruit ratings: Rivals: 247Sports:				
Overall recruit ranking: Rivals: N/A (WR), 13 (WI) 247Sports: 203 (WR), 10 (WI)
Note: In many cases, Scout, Rivals, 247Sports, On3, and ESPN may conflict in their listings of height and weight.; In these cases, the average was taken. ESPN grades are on a 100-point scale.; Sources: "2013 Team Ranking". Rivals.com.

== College career ==
Weah attended Pittsburgh, where he played wide receiver for the football program for four years, beginning in 2013. Weah redshirted the 2013 season as a true freshman. Weah saw action in 17 games across the 2014 and 2015 seasons, but mostly in a special teams capacity, as he failed to record any catches. Weah broke out in the 2016 season, when he played in 13 games, starting in seven. Weah was the team's best receiver statistically, as he led Pittsburgh in receptions (36), receiving yards (870), and touchdowns (10). Weah led the ACC and was second nationally in yards per catch, with 24.2. In his senior season, Weah started in every game but one, catching 41 passes for 698 yards and four touchdowns as Pitt utilized three different quarterbacks.

Weah graduated from Pittsburgh with a degree in communications.

=== College statistics ===
Year	Team	GP	Receiving		
Year	Team	GP	Rec	Yards	TDs
2014	Pittsburgh	8	0	0	0
2015	Pittsburgh	9	0	2	0
2016	Pittsburgh	13	36	870	10
2017	Pittsburgh	12	41	698	4
College totals		42	77	1,570	14

== Professional career ==
Pre-draft measurables
Height	Weight	Arm length	Hand span	40-yard dash	10-yard split	20-yard shuttle	Three-cone drill	Vertical jump	Broad jump	Bench press
6 ft 2 in (1.88 m)	211 lb (96 kg)	31 1/8 in (0.79 m)	9 5/8 in (0.24 m)	4.43 s	1.53 s	4.41 s	7.24 s	38 in (0.97 m)	10 ft 9 in (3.28 m)	15 reps
All values from the NFL Combine

=== Houston Texans ===
Weah signed with the Houston Texans as an undrafted free agent following the 2018 NFL draft. On August 31, 2018, Weah was released by the Texans as part of final roster cuts, but was subsequently signed to the team’s practice squad. On October 2, 2018 Weah was moved to injury reserve. On January 7, 2019, Weah was signed to a futures contract by the Texans. On August 30, 2019, Weah was released as part of the final roster cuts.

=== Washington Redskins / Football Team ===
On October 10, 2019, Weah was signed to the Washington Redskins practice squad. On December 27, Weah was promoted to the active roster after the team moved two members of the secondary to injured reserve.

On September 5, 2020, Weah was waived by Washington.

=== Chicago Bears ===
On January 15, 2021, Weah signed a reserve/futures contract with the Chicago Bears. He was waived on August 16, 2021.

=== Saskatchewan Roughriders ===
Weah signed with the Saskatchewan Roughriders of the Canadian Football League (CFL) on December 21, 2021. In two preseason games he caught three passes for 25 yards and one touchdown. He was released by the Riders on June 9, 2022, as part of the team's final roster cuts. Weah re-signed with the team on July 23, 2022, midway through the 2022 season. On May 26, 2023, Weah retired from professional football.

== Personal life ==
Weah is the nephew of George Weah, who is the former president of Liberia and the only African player to ever win the Ballon d'Or, which he was awarded in 1995 as a member of A.C. Milan. Weah is also the cousin of Tim Weah, who plays forward for Juventus and the United States men's national soccer team, as well as George Weah Jr., who most recently played midfielder for French clubs Paris Saint-Germain and Tours.
