= Milford Academy =

Milford Academy Falcons

Location
- 7 School Street; New Berlin, Chenango County, New York 13411; United States; 42.622956°N 75.334067°W

Information
- Type: Prep school Boarding school in New Berlin New York Independent high school
- Established: 1916
- Campus size: 3 acres (1.2 ha)
- Colors: Burgundy and white Milford Academy Falcons
- Website: milfordacademy.org

Milford Academy (formerly Yale Preparatory School) is an all-boys post-secondary school originally located at 104 Gulf Street in Milford, Connecticut. The school endured many health violations, prompting the state to shut it down. It subsequently relocated to New Berlin, New York. Founded in 1916 as a college-preparatory school, it focuses on athletes who have the potential to play collegiate sports but who are not yet academically ready. The school places photographs and memorabilia of alumni who were drafted or signed by a professional sports team into the school's "hall of fame".

== Notable alumni ==
- Antonio Anderson, professional basketball player
- Cameron Artis-Payne, NFL player
- Albie Booth, Yale football star
- Matt Brown, professional football player
- Mike Carlson, UK journalist, author, and sports commentator
- Lisa Cortés, film producer and director
- Yinka Dare, NBA player
- Antonio Dixon, NFL player
- Shaun Dolac, NFL player
- Tyrique Jarrett, NFL player
- Terrance Knighton, NFL player
- Tyler Matakevich, NFL player, All-American college football player at Temple
- LeSean McCoy, NFL player
- Todd Meady, MLB player for the Kansas City Royals
- Christian Peter, NFL player
- Jason Peter, NFL player
- Andrew I. Porter, science fiction editor
- Vincent Price, actor
- Travon Van, CFL and IFL player
