= Matt House =

American football coach

Kansas City Chiefs
- Title: Outside linebackers coach

Personal information
- Born: Harrison, Michigan, U.S.

Career information
- High school: Harrison Community (MI)
- College: Michigan State

Career history
- Michigan State (2001–2002) Graduate assistant; North Carolina (2003–2004) Defensive assistant; Gardner–Webb (2005) Defensive line coach; Buffalo Bulls (2006–2007) Defensive backs coach & recruiting coordinator; Carolina Panthers (2008) Assistant special teams coach; St. Louis Rams (2009–2011) Defensive quality control coach; Pittsburgh (2012-2014); Secondary coach (2012); Defensive coordinator (2013-2014); FIU (2015) Defensive coordinator & linebackers coach; Kentucky (2016-2018); Inside linebackers coach & special teams coordinator; Defensive coordinator & inside linebackers coach; Kansas City Chiefs (2019–2021) Linebackers coach; LSU (2022–2023) Defensive coordinator & linebackers coach; Jacksonville Jaguars (2024) Inside linebackers coach; Kansas City Chiefs (2025); Senior defensive assistant (2025); Outside linebackers coach (2026-present)

Awards and highlights
- Super Bowl champion (LIV)

Matt House is an American football coach who currently serves as the outside linebackers coach for the Kansas City Chiefs of the National Football League (NFL).

== Coaching career ==
House began his coaching career at his alma mater Michigan State University in 2001. After the 2002 season he went to the University of North Carolina where he served as an assistant defensive coach for two seasons. In 2006 he became the Buffalo Bulls’ defensive backs coach and recruiting coordinator. He made the jump to the NFL in 2008 as an assistant special teams coach for the Panthers. For the next three years he coached in St. Louis under Steve Spagnuolo as a defensive quality control coach. In 2012 he returned to the college ranks working at Pitt as the team's secondary coach. The following year he was promoted to defensive coordinator where he stayed until the end of the 2014 season. In 2015 he served as FIUs defensive coordinator and inside linebackers coach.

For 2016, he joined Mark Stoops Kentucky staff as the team's inside linebackers coach and special teams coordinator. The following season he was promoted to defensive coordinator and remained in that position until the end of the 2018 season when he made his return to the National Football League.

In 2019, House became the Chiefs’ linebackers coach, joining a staff that would go on to win the Super Bowl that season defeating the San Francisco 49ers, and then also make an appearance in the 2020 Super Bowl before losing to the Tampa Bay Buccaneers. In December 2021, House was named defensive coordinator at LSU. LSU's defense in 2023 had one of the worst performances in team history. Head Coach Brian Kelly announced on January 3, 2024, that LSU and Matt House would part ways prior to the 2024 season.

On February 22, 2024, House was named inside linebackers coach for the Jacksonville Jaguars.

On February 17, 2025, House was returned to the Chiefs and was named the senior defensive assistant for the team. On February 22, 2026, House was promoted to serve as Kansas City's outside linebackers coach.
