= Chris Blewitt =

American football player (born 1995)

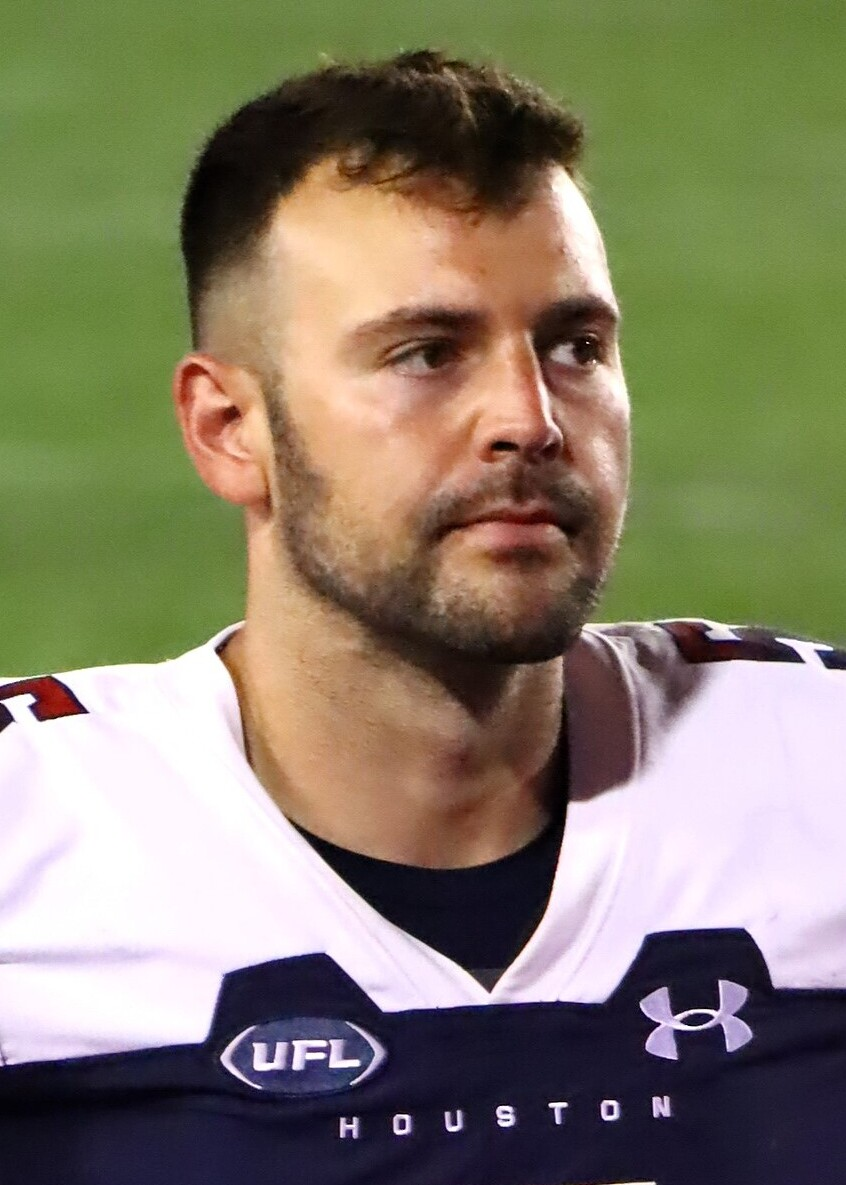
- Blewitt with the Houston Roughnecks in 2025

Profile
- Position: Placekicker

Personal information
- Born: May 2, 1995 (age 31)
- Listed height: 5 ft 9 in (1.75 m)
- Listed weight: 171 lb (78 kg)

Career information
- High school: West Potomac (Fairfax County, Virginia)
- College: Pittsburgh
- NFL draft: 2017: undrafted

Career history
- Chicago Bears (2019)*; Washington Football Team (2021); Cleveland Browns (2021–2022)*; Pittsburgh Maulers (2023); Birmingham Stallions (2024); Michigan Panthers (2025)*; Houston Roughnecks (2025)
- * Offseason or practice squad member only

Awards and highlights
- UFL champion (2024)

Career NFL statistics
- Field goals made: 2
- Field goals attempted: 5
- Field goal %: 40
- Longest field goal: 52
- Stats at Pro Football Reference

Christopher C. Blewitt (born May 2, 1995) is an American professional football placekicker. He played college football for the Pittsburgh Panthers, where he finished as their all-time leader in field goals made and second all-time in total points. Blewitt originally signed as an undrafted free agent with the Chicago Bears in 2019. He has also been a member of the Washington Football Team, Cleveland Browns, Pittsburgh Maulers, Birmingham Stallions, and Michigan Panthers.

== Early life and college ==
In his junior and senior year at West Potomac High School, Blewitt was ranked as one of the top kickers in his class. He was offered a scholarship by the University of Pittsburgh in June 2012 following a standout performance at the Panthers' specialist camp. In 2013, Blewitt took over the starting duties as Pitt's kicker. He broke many previously set records as a freshman. From 2014 to 2015, Blewitt continued breaking records and leading Pitt in scoring. In 2016, he finished his career at Pitt as their all-time kick scoring leader, with 363 points from 55 field goals and 198 extra points.

Blewitt's most memorable moment came when he made a 48-yard field goal on the road against #3 Clemson with six seconds remaining. The kick put Pitt ahead to ultimately defeat Clemson, giving the Tigers their only loss in what would ultimately become a national championship winning season. It was Clemson's first home loss in three years, and Clemson would not lose at home again for another six years.

=== Statistics ===
College statistics
Season	Field goals				PATs			Kickoffs		Points
Season	FGM	FGA	FG%	Long	XPM	XPA	XP%	KO	TBs	Points
2013	14	18	77.8%	47	40	41	97.6%	67	13	82
2014	16	21	76.2%	52	50	51	98%	78	37	98
2015	15	23	65.2%	56	42	43	97.7%	68	43	87
2016	10	17	58.8%	50	66	69	95.7%	93	26	96
Career	55	79	69.6%	56	198	204	97.1%	306	119	363

== Professional career ==
Pre-draft measurables
Height	Weight	Arm length	Hand span	40-yard dash	10-yard split	20-yard split	20-yard shuttle	Three-cone drill	Vertical jump	Broad jump
5 ft 9 1/4 in (1.76 m)	183 lb (83 kg)	29 in (0.74 m)	8 1/2 in (0.22 m)	4.95 s	1.77 s	2.73 s	4.56 s	7.61 s	27.0 in (0.69 m)	8 ft 8 in (2.64 m)
All values from Pro Day

=== Chicago Bears ===
Blewitt was invited to Pittsburgh Steelers' rookie minicamp in May 2017 but was not offered a contract. He later signed with the Chicago Bears on March 6, 2019, but was waived on June 12, 2019.

=== Washington Football Team ===
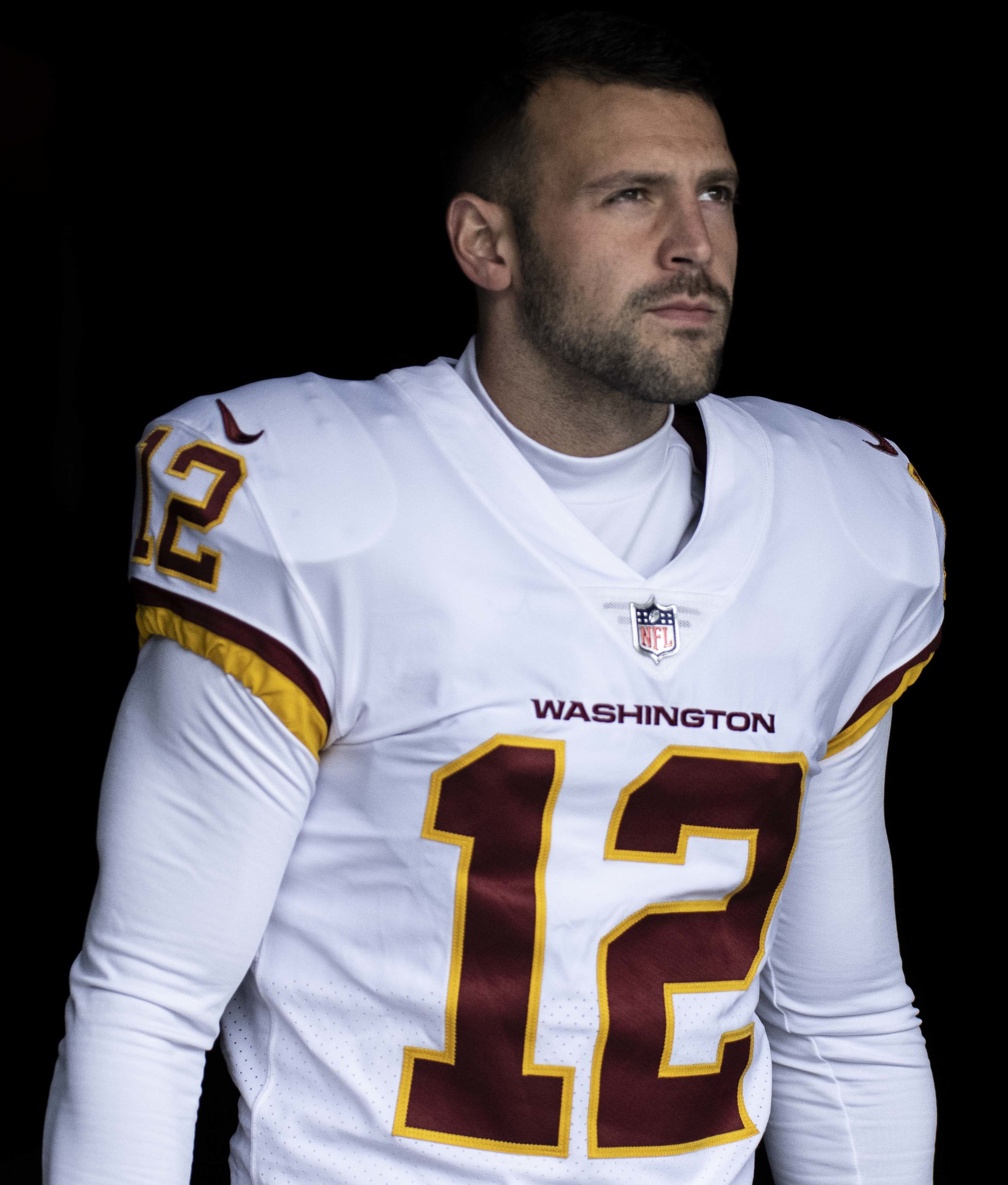
Blewitt with the Washington Football Team in 2021

Blewitt signed with the Washington Football Team's practice squad in October 2021. He was promoted to the active roster after their previous kicker, Dustin Hopkins, was released on October 20, but was waived on November 9 after getting three field goal attempts blocked over two weeks.

=== Cleveland Browns ===
Blewitt was signed to the Cleveland Browns' practice squad on December 29, 2021. He signed a reserve/futures contract with the Browns on January 11, 2022, and was released on May 2, 2022.

=== Pittsburgh Maulers ===
Blewitt signed with the Pittsburgh Maulers of the United States Football League on April 27, 2023, and was subsequently placed on the team's inactive roster.

He made his USFL debut on April 30 against the Philadelphia Stars and tied a league record with five field goals in the Maulers' first win of the season. Following his performance, he was named the USFL Special Teams Player of the Week. The Maulers folded when the XFL and USFL merged to create the United Football League (UFL).

=== Birmingham Stallions ===
On January 5, 2024, Blewitt was selected by the Birmingham Stallions during the 2024 UFL dispersal draft. He was placed on injured reserve on April 22, 2024. He was activated on May 28, 2024. He re-signed with the team on August 22, 2024. He was released on January 22, 2025.

=== Michigan Panthers ===
On March 18, 2025, Blewitt was signed by the Michigan Panthers. He was released by the Panthers on March 20.

=== Houston Roughnecks ===
On March 20, 2025, Blewitt was claimed off waivers by the Houston Roughnecks.
