= Pat Narduzzi =

American football player and coach (born 1966)

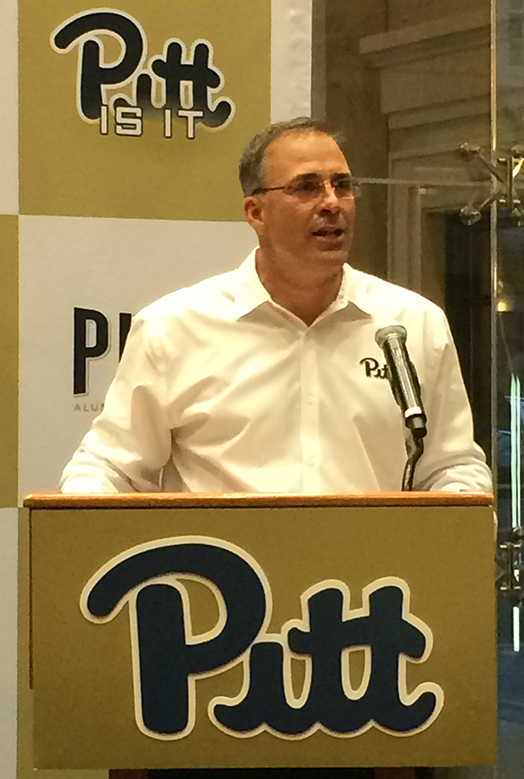
- Narduzzi in 2015

Current position
- Title: Head coach
- Team: Pittsburgh
- Conference: ACC
- Record: 86–66
- Annual salary: $7.3 million

Biographical details
- Born: April 22, 1966 (age 60); New Haven, Connecticut, U.S.

Playing career
- 1985: Youngstown State
- 1987–1989: Rhode Island
- Position: Linebacker

Coaching career (HC unless noted)
- 1990–1991: Miami (OH) (GA)
- 1992: Miami (OH) (WR)
- 1993–1997: Rhode Island (LB)
- 1998–1999: Rhode Island (DC)
- 2000–2002: Northern Illinois (LB)
- 2003: Miami (OH) (DC)
- 2004–2006: Cincinnati (DC)
- 2007–2014: Michigan State (DC)
- 2015–present: Pittsburgh

Head coaching record
- Overall: 86–66
- Bowls: 2–6

Accomplishments and honors

Championships
- 1 ACC (2021); 2 ACC Coastal Division (2018, 2021)

Awards
- Broyles Award (2013)

Patrick Regan Narduzzi (born April 22, 1966) is an American college football coach and former player. Since 2015, he has been the head coach of the University of Pittsburgh. He was formerly the defensive coordinator at Michigan State. He attended Youngstown State University and the University of Rhode Island. He earned his master's degree from Miami University.

== Early life and education ==
Narduzzi was born on April 22, 1966, in New Haven, Connecticut. He began his playing career at Ursuline High School in Youngstown, Ohio, leading the Fighting Irish to the Steel Valley Conference championship and the state playoffs as a senior in 1984. He was named to the All-Ohio team that year.

== Career ==
In 1990, Narduzzi began his coaching career at Miami University in Oxford, Ohio, where he was a graduate assistant in 1990 and 1991 and where he tutored wide receivers in 1992.

From 1993 to 1999, Narduzzi coached at the University of Rhode Island, where he coached the linebackers from 1993 to 1997 and was defensive coordinator from 1998 to 1999. From 2000 to 2002, he was linebackers coach at Northern Illinois University. He returned to Miami University as defensive coordinator in 2003 before joining the University of Cincinnati as defensive coordinator in 2004.

=== Assistant coach ===
==== Cincinnati ====
Narduzzi became the defensive coordinator at the University of Cincinnati in 2004, and left in 2007 to coach at Michigan State University. Narduzzi was a candidate for the head coaching position at Cincinnati, but Central Michigan University head coach Brian Kelly was named to the post on December 3, 2006. Narduzzi had informed University of Cincinnati officials that if he was not offered a permanent head coach position, he would follow Mark Dantonio to Michigan State University as defensive coordinator.

==== Michigan State ====
Narduzzi was brought along by Dantonio to revamp the depleted Michigan State defense that previous coach John L. Smith left behind. Led by Narduzzi's stingy defenses, the Spartans improved dramatically, amassing four seasons of 11 or more wins, two Big Ten Conference championships, and six victories over rival Michigan in seven years. From 2011–2014, Michigan State was the only team to rank in the FBS Top 10 in total defense and rushing defense. Narduzzi was pursued for other jobs, including as defensive coordinator at Texas A&M University and head coach at University of Connecticut. Narduzzi chose to remain at Michigan State and helped the 2012 team and the 2013 team lead the Big Ten in total defense. In 2013, he won the Broyles Award, which is given to the nation's best assistant coach.

In his last game as MSU's defensive coordinator, the Spartans won the Goodyear Cotton Bowl Classic by rallying from 20 points down in the fourth quarter and finished the season with an overall record of 11–2. Dantonio said of Narduzzi after the game: "You want the best for your people. To win the last game like that for Coach Narduzzi was something that we could to send him out with and that will be a memory for life. He's been incredibly loyal here. He's an extremely hard worker. He's been extremely successful. And now it's time for him to grow. He'll grow as the head coach at the University of Pittsburgh. They're getting a great football coach and a great person and a guy who is going to impact young people. So it's going to be very exciting for him as well as his family."

=== Pitt ===
On December 23, 2014, Sports Illustrated reported Narduzzi would become the new head coach of the University of Pittsburgh football team. On December 26, 2014, Narduzzi was officially introduced as the 36th head football coach.

In 2015, Narduzzi led Pitt to an 8–5 record and a trip to the Military Bowl where they lost to Navy, 44–28. In 2016, Pitt recorded another 8–5 record as they went to the Pinstripe Bowl, but lost to Northwestern, 31–24. His second season was highlighted by two wins against top-five teams, a 43–42 upset win over eventual national champion Clemson and a 42–39 victory over eventual Big Ten champion Penn State.

Pitt opened 2017 with optimism over QB Max Browne but endured a tumultuous season. After struggling in a 28–21 win over FCS Youngstown State and losing 33–14 the next week to Penn State, Narduzzi's defense faltered in a 59–21 loss to #9 Oklahoma State and a 35–17 defeat in their ACC opener to Georgia Tech. Despite wins over Duke (24–17) and Virginia (31–14), they also lost to Syracuse (27–24), #20 NC State (35–17), North Carolina (34–31), and Virginia tech (20–14). On Black Friday, Pitt shocked #2 Miami 24–14 and finished the season 5–7 (3–5 in the ACC).

In 2018, after a slow start to the season that included a 51-6 loss to Penn State, Narduzzi led Pitt to its first ACC Coastal Division title, going 6–2 in conference play and 7–5 overall. Pitt then faced Clemson in the 2018 ACC Championship Game, where they lost 42–10. Pitt went to the Sun Bowl but lost to Stanford, 14–13, to finish the season 7–7.

In 2019, Narduzzi led Pitt to another 7–5 regular season record, with a notable win over UCF, ending their 27-game regular season win streak. Pitt competed in the Quick Lane Bowl against Eastern Michigan University, winning 34–30 and earning Narduzzi his first bowl victory during his tenure at Pitt.

In 2021, with the emergence of Heisman finalist Kenny Pickett, Narduzzi led Pitt to a 11–3 record, ACC Coastal Division title, ACC Championship victory, and an appearance in the Peach Bowl.

Narduzzi entered 2022 as the third-winningest coach in Pitt history, behind only Hall of Famers Jock Sutherland and Pop Warner. A year later, a victory over Miami vaulted him past Warner for second place on Pitt's all-time wins list.

With Pitt's 2026 victory over Syracuse, Narduzzi surpassed Sutherland to become the school's all-time leader in games coached, with 144.

== Personal life ==
Narduzzi is the son of Bill Narduzzi, who was the head coach at Youngstown State University from 1975 to 1985. Pat played football for his father in 1985 as a freshman. Narduzzi is married and has four children.

== Head coaching record ==
Year	Team	Overall	Conference	Standing	Bowl/playoffs	Coaches^{#}	AP^{°}
Pittsburgh Panthers (Atlantic Coast Conference) (2015–present)
2015	Pittsburgh	8–5	6–2	2nd (Coastal)	L Military		
2016	Pittsburgh	8–5	5–3	T–2nd (Coastal)	L Pinstripe		
2017	Pittsburgh	5–7	3–5	T–4th (Coastal)			
2018	Pittsburgh	7–7	6–2	1st (Coastal)	L Sun		
2019	Pittsburgh	8–5	4–4	T–3rd (Coastal)	W Quick Lane		
2020	Pittsburgh	6–5	5–5	T–6th			
2021	Pittsburgh	11–3	7–1	1st (Coastal)	L Peach^{†}	13	13
2022	Pittsburgh	9–4	5–3	T–2nd (Coastal)	W Sun	22	22
2023	Pittsburgh	3–9	2–6	T–11th			
2024	Pittsburgh	7–6	3–5	T–10th	L GameAbove Sports		
2025	Pittsburgh	8–5	6–2	T–2nd	L Military		
2026	Pittsburgh	6–5	3–5	TBD	TBD		
Pittsburgh:		86–66	55–44				
Total:		86–66					
National championship Conference title Conference division title or championship game berth
^{†}Indicates Bowl Coalition, Bowl Alliance, BCS, or CFP / New Years' Six bowl.; ^{#}Rankings from final Coaches Poll.; ^{°}Rankings from final AP Poll.
