= Ryan Lewis (American football) =

American football player (born 1994)

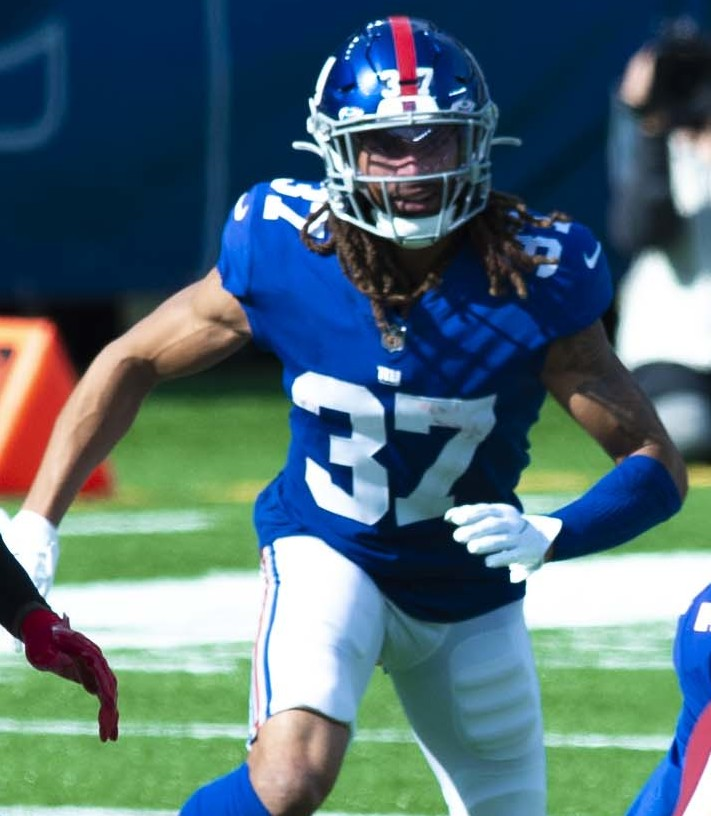
- Lewis with the New York Giants in 2020

Eastern Washington Eagles
- Title: Defensive backs coach

Personal information
- Born: April 15, 1994 (age 32); Lancaster, Pennsylvania, U.S.
- Listed height: 6 ft 0 in (1.83 m)
- Listed weight: 195 lb (88 kg)

Career information
- High school: Eastlake (Sammamish, Washington)
- College: Pittsburgh (2012–2016)
- NFL draft: 2017: undrafted

Career history

Playing
- Arizona Cardinals (2017)*; New England Patriots (2017–2018)*; Buffalo Bills (2018); Indianapolis Colts (2019); Philadelphia Eagles (2019); Miami Dolphins (2019); Washington Football Team (2020)*; New York Giants (2020); San Antonio Brahmas (2023)
- * Offseason or practice squad member only

Coaching
- Colorado Mines (2024–2025) Assistant defensive backs coach; Eastern Washington (2026–present) Defensive backs coach

Career NFL statistics
- Total tackles: 56
- Forced fumbles: 2
- Pass deflections: 9
- Interceptions: 1
- Stats at Pro Football Reference

Ryan Lewis (born April 15, 1994) is an American former football cornerback who is the defensive backs coach for the Eastern Washington Eagles. He played college football at the University of Pittsburgh. He was signed by the Arizona Cardinals as an undrafted free agent and has been a member of the New England Patriots, Buffalo Bills, Indianapolis Colts, Philadelphia Eagles, Miami Dolphins, Washington Football Team, and New York Giants.

== College career ==
Lewis attended the University of Pittsburgh, where he played for head coach Paul Chryst, Joe Rudolph, and Pat Narduzzi in his four seasons. He recorded two interceptions his senior season, including one off of future-NFL quarterback Deshaun Watson in a 43-42 upset win over the then-#2 Clemson Tigers, and clinching the Panthers' victory over Pitt's rivals, the Penn State Nittany Lions.

== Professional career ==
=== Arizona Cardinals ===
Lewis was signed by the Arizona Cardinals as an undrafted free agent on May 2, 2017. He was waived on September 2, 2017 and was signed to the practice squad the next day. He was released on September 12, 2017.

=== New England Patriots ===
On September 13, 2017, Lewis was signed to the New England Patriots' practice squad. With the Patriots, he made Super Bowl 52, but lost to the Philadelphia Eagles 41-33. He signed a reserve/future contract with the Patriots on February 6, 2018.

On August 31, 2018, Lewis was waived by the Patriots.

=== Buffalo Bills ===
On September 2, 2018, Lewis was claimed by the Buffalo Bills. He was waived on September 12, 2018 and was re-signed to the practice squad. He was promoted back to the active roster on September 18, 2018. He was released during final roster cuts on August 31, 2019.

=== Indianapolis Colts ===
On September 1, 2019, Lewis was claimed off waivers by the Indianapolis Colts. He was released by the Colts on September 27, 2019.

=== Philadelphia Eagles ===
On October 1, 2019, Lewis was signed to the Philadelphia Eagles practice squad. He was promoted to the active roster on October 4. He was waived on October 14.

=== Miami Dolphins ===
On October 15, 2019, Lewis was claimed off waivers by the Miami Dolphins. In week 12 against the Cleveland Browns, Lewis recorded his first career interception off a pass thrown by Baker Mayfield in the 41–24 loss. He was placed on injured reserve on December 10, 2019, and was waived on July 29, 2020.

=== Washington Football Team ===
Lewis was claimed off waivers by the Washington Football Team on July 30, 2020, but was waived on September 5, 2020.

=== New York Giants ===
On September 8, 2020, Lewis was signed to the New York Giants practice squad. He was elevated to the active roster on September 19 for the team's week 2 game against the Chicago Bears, and reverted to the practice squad after the game. He was promoted to the active roster on September 22, 2020. He was placed on injured reserve on November 6. Lewis was waived after the season on April 14, 2021.

=== San Antonio Brahmas ===
On November 17, 2022, Lewis was drafted by the San Antonio Brahmas of the XFL. He was placed on the reserve list by the team on April 11, 2023. He re-signed with the team on January 22, 2024. He was released on March 10, 2024.

== Personal life ==
Lewis is the son of Will Lewis, a former NFL cornerback and executive with the Seattle Seahawks, and a cousin of ESPN analyst Louis Riddick. Lewis has a fiancé by the name Michaela Farrer and two dogs, Luna and Ziggy.

On May 31, 2024, Lewis announced his retirement and took a job with the Colorado Mines Orediggers.
