= Scott Orndoff =

American football player (born 1993)

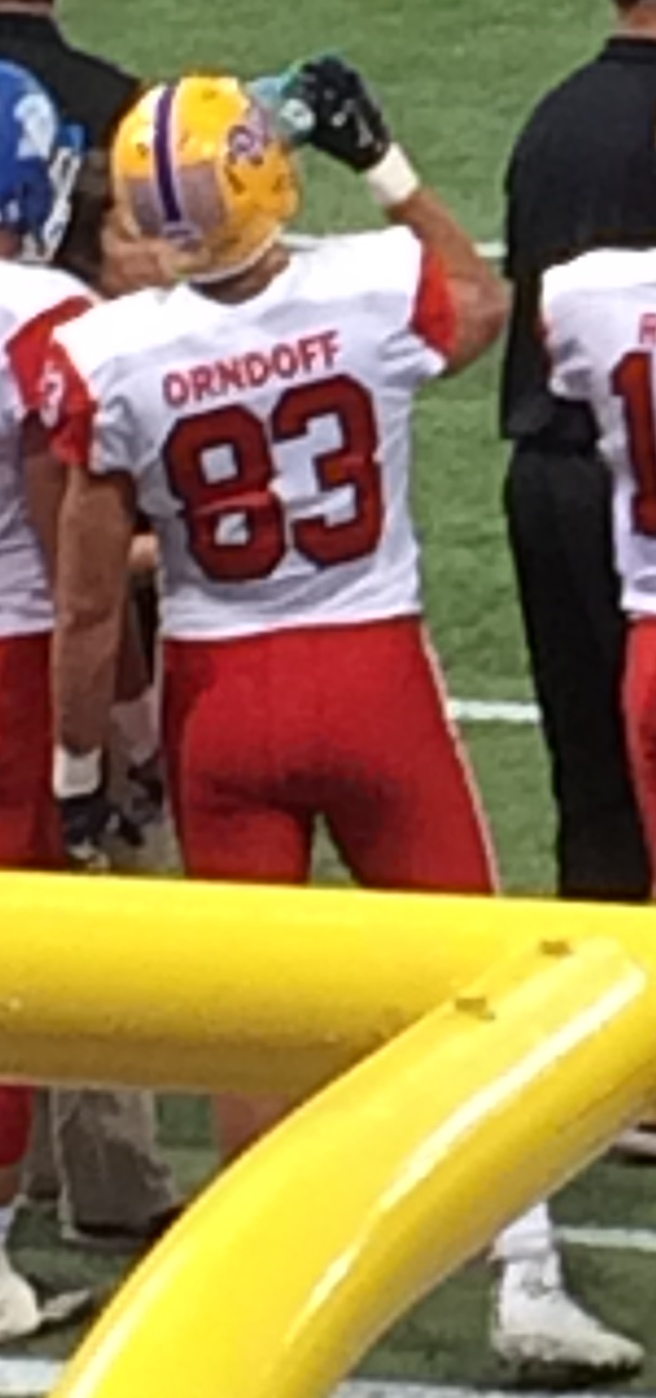
- Orndoff at the 2017 East–West Shrine Game

No. 80, 83, 87
- Position: Tight end

Personal information
- Born: December 16, 1993 (age 32); Waynesburg, Pennsylvania
- Listed height: 6 ft 5 in (1.96 m)
- Listed weight: 256 lb (116 kg)

Career information
- High school: Seton-La Salle Catholic (Mt. Lebanon, Pennsylvania)
- College: Pittsburgh
- NFL draft: 2017: undrafted

Career history
- Pittsburgh Steelers (2017)*; Detroit Lions (2017)*; Cincinnati Bengals (2017)*; Jacksonville Jaguars (2018)*; Orlando Apollos (2019); Tampa Bay Buccaneers (2019)*; Philadelphia Eagles (2019)*
- * Offseason or practice squad member only
- O/OrndSc00.htm Stats at Pro Football Reference

Scott Orndoff (born December 16, 1993) is an American former football tight end. He played college football at Pittsburgh.

== College career ==
In his career at Pittsburgh, Orndoff had 58 receptions for 897 yards with 13 touchdowns.

== Professional career ==
=== Pittsburgh Steelers ===
Orndoff signed with the Pittsburgh Steelers as an undrafted free agent on May 1, 2017. He was waived by the Steelers on August 2, 2017.

=== Detroit Lions ===
On August 21, 2017, Orndoff signed with the Detroit Lions. He was waived on September 2, 2017.

=== Cincinnati Bengals ===
On October 16, 2017, Orndoff was signed to the Cincinnati Bengals' practice squad. He was released on November 7, 2017 but was re-signed two days later. He signed a reserve/future contract with the Bengals on January 1, 2018. He was waived on May 14, 2018.

=== Jacksonville Jaguars ===
On May 30, 2018, Orndoff signed with the Jacksonville Jaguars. He was waived on September 1, 2018.

=== Orlando Apollos ===
In 2018, Orndoff signed with the Orlando Apollos for the 2019 season.

=== Tampa Bay Buccaneers ===
On July 31, 2019, Orndoff was signed by the Tampa Bay Buccaneers. He was waived during final roster cuts on August 30, 2019.

=== Philadelphia Eagles ===
Orndoff was signed to the Philadelphia Eagles' practice squad on October 28, 2019. He was released on November 12, 2019, but re-signed the next day. He was released on December 16.
