= Tyrique Jarrett =

American football player (born 1994)

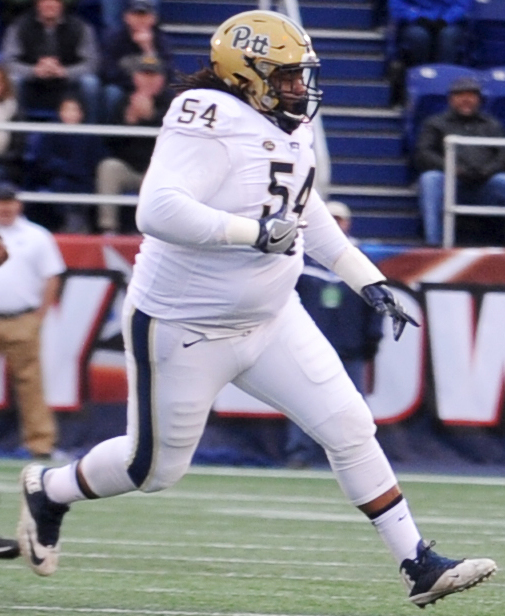
- Jarrett with the Pittsburgh Panthers in 2015

No. 98
- Position: Nose tackle

Personal information
- Born: February 16, 1994 (age 32); Pittsburgh, Pennsylvania, U.S.
- Listed height: 6 ft 3 in (1.91 m)
- Listed weight: 335 lb (152 kg)

Career information
- High school: Taylor Allderdice (Pittsburgh)
- College: Pittsburgh
- NFL draft: 2017: undrafted

Career history
- Denver Broncos (2017)

Career NFL statistics
- Total tackles: 1
- Stats at Pro Football Reference

Tyrique J. Jarrett (born February 16, 1994) is an American former professional football player who was a nose tackle for the Denver Broncos of the National Football League (NFL). He played college football for the Pittsburgh Panthers.

== Early life ==
Jarrett played high school football at Taylor Allderdice High School in Pittsburgh, Pennsylvania. In 2011, he was named the Pittsburgh City League's top lineman and helped the team advance to the City League title game. He also earned Pennsylvania Football News All-Class AAAA and Pittsburgh Tribune-Review "Terrific 25" honors while at Taylor Allderdice and was a two-time First-team All-City League selection. Jarrett spent time playing both offense and defense at Taylor Allderdice. He was selected to play in the Big 33 Football Classic in June 2012.

Jarrett played football at Milford Academy in 2012, helping the team to a 7–4 record. He recorded 26 tackles, 2.5 sacks, 1 blocked kick and 1 interception, which was also returned for a touchdown.

== College career ==
Jarrett played defensive tackle for the Pittsburgh Panthers of the University of Pittsburgh from 2013 to 2016, lettering from 2014 to 2016. He enrolled at the school in January 2013. He played in two games in 2013, recording one tackle assist. Jarrett played in eight games in 2014, recording one solo tackle and seven tackle assists. He played in 12 games, starting 8, in 2015, recording 14 solo tackles, 6 tackle assists and 2 sacks. He played in 10 games, all starts, in 2016, recording 19 solo tackles, 11 tackle assists and 1 sack. Jarrett missed the final three games of the 2016 regular season due to injury. He was named Honorable Mention All-ACC by the media in 2016. He played in 32 games, starting 18, during his college career, recording 34 solo tackles, 25 tackle assists and 3 sacks. Jarrett was an Administration of Justice major at Pittsburgh.

== Professional career ==
Jarrett was rated as the 71st best defensive tackle in the 2017 NFL draft by NFLDraftScout.com. Lance Zierlein of NFL.com predicted that he would go undrafted and be a priority free agent, stating "If he can play with better pad level and improve his hand usage to take full advantage of his size, he might be able to improve enough to create an opportunity for himself with a team that is looking for size".

Pre-draft measurables
Height	Weight	40-yard dash	10-yard split	20-yard split	20-yard shuttle	Vertical jump	Broad jump	Bench press
6 ft 2 in (1.88 m)	340 lb (154 kg)	5.45 s	1.92 s	3.15 s	5.10 s	22 1/2 in (0.57 m)	8 ft 2 in (2.49 m)	22 reps
All values from Pittsburgh Pro Day

After going undrafted, Jarrett signed with the Denver Broncos on May 11, 2017. He was waived on September 2 and signed to the team's practice squad on September 3. He was promoted to the active roster on September 11. He was waived on September 16 and signed to the team's practice squad on September 18, 2017. He was released on December 18, 2017.

== Personal life ==
Jarrett's father played college football at Slippery Rock University.
