= Ejuan Price =

American football player (born 1993)

No. 51
- Position: Linebacker

Personal information
- Born: January 30, 1993 (age 33); Rankin, Pennsylvania, U.S.
- Listed height: 5 ft 11 in (1.80 m)
- Listed weight: 255 lb (116 kg)

Career information
- High school: Woodland Hills (Churchill, Pennsylvania)
- College: Pittsburgh
- NFL draft: 2017: 7th round, 234th overall pick

Career history
- Los Angeles Rams (2017); Baltimore Ravens (2019)*
- * Offseason or practice squad member only

Awards and highlights
- 2× First-team All-ACC (2015, 2016)
- Stats at Pro Football Reference

Ejuan Amir Price (born January 30, 1993) is an American former professional football linebacker. He played college football at Pittsburgh.

== College career ==
Price played college football for the University of Pittsburgh.

== Professional career ==
Pre-draft measurables
Height	Weight	Arm length	Hand span	40-yard dash	10-yard split	20-yard split	20-yard shuttle	Three-cone drill	Vertical jump	Broad jump	Bench press
5 ft 10 7/8 in (1.80 m)	241 lb (109 kg)	32 3/4 in (0.83 m)	10 in (0.25 m)	4.75 s	1.62 s	2.65 s	4.40 s	6.98 s	34 1/2 in (0.88 m)	10 ft 2 in (3.10 m)	20 reps
All values from NFL Combine/Pro Day

=== Los Angeles Rams ===
Price was selected by the Los Angeles Rams in the seventh round with the 234th overall pick in the 2017 NFL draft. He was waived by the Rams on December 2, 2017, and re-signed to the practice squad. He signed a reserve/future contract with the Rams on January 8, 2018.

On September 1, 2018, Price was waived by the Rams.

=== Baltimore Ravens ===
On January 2, 2019, Price signed a reserve/future contract with the Baltimore Ravens. He was waived on May 14, 2019.
