= 2014 South Carolina Gamecocks football team =

American college football season

2014 South Carolina Gamecocks football

Independence Bowl champion

Independence Bowl, W 24–21 vs. Miami (FL)
- Conference: Southeastern Conference
- East Division
- Record: 7–6 (3–5 SEC)
- Head coach: Steve Spurrier (10th season)
- Co-offensive coordinators: Steve Spurrier Jr. (3rd season); Shawn Elliott (3rd season)
- Offensive scheme: Fun and gun
- Defensive coordinator: Lorenzo Ward (3rd season)
- Base defense: 4–2–5
- Home stadium: Williams-Brice Stadium

2014 Southeastern Conference football standings
	Conf.			Overall
Team	W		L	W		L
Eastern Division
No. 14 Missouri x	7	–	1	11	–	3
No. 9 Georgia	6	–	2	10	–	3
Florida	4	–	4	7	–	5
Tennessee	3	–	5	7	–	6
South Carolina	3	–	5	7	–	6
Kentucky	2	–	6	5	–	7
Vanderbilt	0	–	8	3	–	9
Western Division
No. 4 Alabama x$^	7	–	1	12	–	2
No. 11 Mississippi State	6	–	2	10	–	3
No. 17 Ole Miss *	5	–	3	9	–	4
No. 22 Auburn	4	–	4	8	–	5
LSU *	4	–	4	8	–	5
Texas A&M	3	–	5	8	–	5
Arkansas	2	–	6	7	–	6
Championship: Alabama 42, Missouri 13
^ – College Football Playoff participant; $ – Conference champion; x – Division champion/co-champions; * LSU and Ole Miss vacated all wins (except for Ole Miss' win over Presbyterian) due to NCAA violations.; Rankings from AP Poll

The 2014 South Carolina Gamecocks football team represented the University of South Carolina in the 2014 NCAA Division I FBS football season. The Gamecocks competed as a member of the Southeastern Conference (SEC) as part of its East Division. The team was led by head coach Steve Spurrier, in his tenth year, and played its home games at Williams–Brice Stadium in Columbia, South Carolina. They finished the season 7–6, 3–5 in SEC play to finish in fifth place in the East Division. They were invited to the Independence Bowl where they defeated Miami (FL).

After three eleven-win seasons, South Carolina began ranked No. 9 in the country, and tied for the eleventh-best odds to win the national championship. However, despite Dylan Thompson breaking the school record and leading the SEC in passing yards, this season would mark the end of South Carolina's golden age. (Note: The 2010 through 2013 seasons are widely considered the best era in Gamecock football history.) The opening upset blowout loss to No. 21 Texas A&M snapped the Gamecocks' eighteen-game home winning streak. The Gamecocks rebounded, winning the next three games, including an upset over No. 6 Georgia. However, South Carolina lost five of their last eight games in the regular season, including a loss that sent them out of the top 25 for the first time since 2010, and their first loss to archrival Clemson since 2008. The fourth consecutive bowl victory was a school record, but the seven wins were the fewest since 2009. For the rest of the mid-to-late 2010s, South Carolina would struggle to return to national prominence. (Note: In 2017, South Carolina would win nine games, but none against ranked opponents. Between 2015 and 2021, South Carolina would only be nationally ranked in two different weeks: one week at No. 24 in the CFP rankings in 2017, and one week at No. 24 in the AP Poll in 2018. Between 2015 and 2020, South Carolina would go 31–42, with four losing seasons.)

== Before the season ==
=== 2014 recruiting class ===
College recruiting information (2014)
Name	Hometown	School	Height	Weight	40^{‡}	Commit date
Bryson Allen-Williams; LB	Ellenwood, GA	Cedar Grove	6 ft 1 in (1.85 m)	222 lb (101 kg)	4.92	Apr 15, 2013
Bryson Allen-Williams; LB	Recruit ratings: Scout: Rivals: 247Sports: ESPN:					
Joe Blue; LB, FB	Dillon, SC	Dillon	5 ft 11 in (1.80 m)	235 lb (107 kg)	-	Jan 19, 2013
Joe Blue; LB, FB	Recruit ratings: Scout: Rivals: 247Sports: ESPN:					
Kevin Crosby; TE	Bamberg, SC	Bamberg Ehrhardt	6 ft 0 in (1.83 m)	236 lb (107 kg)	4.88	Jun 1, 2013
Kevin Crosby; TE	Recruit ratings: Scout: Rivals: 247Sports: ESPN:					
Shaq Davidson; WR	Gaffney, SC	Gaffney	6 ft 0 in (1.83 m)	170 lb (77 kg)	4.40	Jul 2, 2013
Shaq Davidson; WR	Recruit ratings: Scout: Rivals: 247Sports: ESPN:					
Terry Googer; WR	Atlanta, GA	Woodward Academy	6 ft 4 in (1.93 m)	209 lb (95 kg)	-	Aug 16, 2013
Terry Googer; WR	Recruit ratings: Scout: Rivals: 247Sports: ESPN:					
Wesley Green; CB	Lithonia, GA	Martin Luther King Jr.	5 ft 11 in (1.80 m)	170 lb (77 kg)	4.52	Feb 5, 2014
Wesley Green; CB	Recruit ratings: Scout: Rivals: 247Sports: ESPN:					
Al Harris Jr. CB	Fort Lauderdale, FL	St. Thomas Aquinas	5 ft 11 in (1.80 m)	160 lb (73 kg)	-	Jul 12, 2013
Al Harris Jr. CB	Recruit ratings: Scout: Rivals: 247Sports: ESPN:					
Abu Lamin; DT	Fayetteville, NC	Fort Scott C.C.	6 ft 3 in (1.91 m)	300 lb (140 kg)	5.00	Jul 29, 2013
Abu Lamin; DT	Recruit ratings: Scout: Rivals: 247Sports: ESPN:					
Chris Lammons; CB	Fort Lauderdale, FL	Plantation	5 ft 9.5 in (1.77 m)	170 lb (77 kg)	4.72	Feb 5, 2014
Chris Lammons; CB	Recruit ratings: Scout: Rivals: 247Sports: ESPN:					
Blake McClain; DE	Ponte Vedra Beach, FL	Sandalwood	6 ft 4 in (1.93 m)	280 lb (130 kg)	-	Feb 5, 2014
Blake McClain; DE	Recruit ratings: Scout: Rivals: 247Sports: ESPN:					
Kalan Ritchie; TE	Goose Creek, SC	Goose Creek	6 ft 5 in (1.96 m)	210 lb (95 kg)	4.80	Apr 30, 2013
Kalan Ritchie; TE	Recruit ratings: Scout: Rivals: 247Sports: ESPN:					
Tyshun Samuel; WR	Inman, SC	Chapman	5 ft 11 in (1.80 m)	180 lb (82 kg)	-	Dec 5, 2013
Tyshun Samuel; WR	Recruit ratings: Scout: Rivals: 247Sports: ESPN:					
Dante Sawyer; DE	Suwanee, GA	North Gwinnett	6 ft 2.5 in (1.89 m)	262 lb (119 kg)	4.65	Dec 17, 2013
Dante Sawyer; DE	Recruit ratings: Scout: Rivals: 247Sports: ESPN:					
Michael Scarnecchia; QB	Orange Park, FL	Fleming Island	6 ft 3 in (1.91 m)	185 lb (84 kg)	-	Oct 20, 2013
Michael Scarnecchia; QB	Recruit ratings: Rivals: 247Sports: ESPN:					
Darin Smalls; S	Summerville, SC	Summerville	5 ft 11 in (1.80 m)	200 lb (91 kg)	-	Jun 22, 2013
Darin Smalls; S	Recruit ratings: Scout: Rivals: 247Sports: ESPN:					
D.J. Smith; CB	Marietta, GA	Walton	6 ft 0 in (1.83 m)	191 lb (87 kg)	-	Jan 13, 2014
D.J. Smith; CB	Recruit ratings: Scout: Rivals: 247Sports: ESPN:					
Taylor Stallworth; DT	Mobile, AL	Murphy	6 ft 2 in (1.88 m)	285 lb (129 kg)	-	Jul 27, 2013
Taylor Stallworth; DT	Recruit ratings: Scout: Rivals: 247Sports: ESPN:					
Donell Stanley; OT, OG	Latta, SC	Latta	6 ft 4 in (1.93 m)	330 lb (150 kg)	5.00	Oct 11, 2013
Donell Stanley; OT, OG	Recruit ratings: Scout: Rivals: 247Sports: ESPN:					
Jhaustin Thomas; DE	Decatur, GA	Trinity Valley C.C.	6 ft 6 in (1.98 m)	255 lb (116 kg)	-	Jun 25, 2013
Jhaustin Thomas; DE	Recruit ratings: Scout: Rivals: 247Sports: ESPN:					
Dexter Wideman; DT	Saluda, SC	Saluda	6 ft 4 in (1.93 m)	255 lb (116 kg)	-	Feb 5, 2014
Dexter Wideman; DT	Recruit ratings: Scout: Rivals: 247Sports: ESPN:					
Malik Young; OG	Piedmont, SC	Woodmont	6 ft 3 in (1.91 m)	277 lb (126 kg)	4.90	May 28, 2013
Malik Young; OG	Recruit ratings: Scout: Rivals: 247Sports: ESPN:					
Overall recruit ranking: Scout: 24 Rivals: 16 247Sports: 15 ESPN: 19
‡ Refers to 40-yard dash; Note: In many cases, Scout, Rivals, 247Sports, On3, and ESPN may conflict in their listings of height, weight and 40 time.; In these cases, the average was taken. ESPN grades are on a 100-point scale.; Sources: "South Carolina Signee List 2014". Rivals.; "Scout.com Football Recruiting: South Carolina". Scout.; "2014 Player Signees – South Carolina". ESPN.; "Scout.com Team Recruiting Rankings". Scout.; "2014 Team Ranking". Rivals.com.

=== National award watch lists ===
- Camp - Mike Davis
- Groza - Elliot Fry
- Hornung - Pharoh Cooper
- Lombardi - A.J. Cann
- Mackey - Rory Anderson
- Maxwell - Mike Davis
- Outland - A.J. Cann
- Outland - Corey Robinson
- Outland - Brandon Shell
- Rimington - Cody Waldrop
- Walker - Mike Davis

=== Preseason All-America ===
- OL A.J. Cann
  - Phil Steele (1st team)
- RB Mike Davis
  - Phil Steele (3rd team)

=== Preseason All-SEC ===
- OL A.J. Cann
  - SEC Media (2nd team)
  - Phil Steele (1st team)
  - Athlon Magazine (1st team)
- RB Mike Davis
  - SEC Media (2nd team)
  - Phil Steele (2nd team)
  - Athlon Magazine (2nd team)
- K Elliot Fry
  - Athlon Magazine (3rd team)
- LB Skai Moore
  - Athlon Magazine (3rd team)
- OL Corey Robinson
  - SEC Media (2nd team)
  - Athlon Magazine (3rd team)
- WR Shaq Roland
  - Athlon Magazine (3rd team)
- DB Brison Williams
  - SEC Media (2nd team)

== Schedule ==
Date	Time	Opponent	Rank	Site	TV	Result	Attendance
August 28	6:00 p.m.	No. 21 Texas A&M	No. 9	Williams-Brice Stadium; Columbia, SC (SEC Nation)	SECN	L 28–52	82,847
September 6	7:00 p.m.	East Carolina*	No. 21	Williams-Brice Stadium; Columbia, SC	ESPNU	W 33–23	80,899
September 13	3:30 p.m.	No. 6 Georgia	No. 24	Williams-Brice Stadium; Columbia, SC (rivalry)	CBS	W 38–35	84,232
September 20	7:30 p.m.	at Vanderbilt	No. 14	Vanderbilt Stadium; Nashville, TN	SECN	W 48–34	34,441
September 27	7:00 p.m.	Missouri	No. 13	Williams-Brice Stadium; Columbia, SC (College GameDay)	ESPN	L 20–21	83,493
October 4	7:30 p.m.	at Kentucky		Commonwealth Stadium; Lexington, KY	SECN	L 38–45	62,135
October 18	12:00 p.m.	Furman*^{†}		Williams-Brice Stadium; Columbia, SC	SECN	W 41–10	78,101
October 25	7:30 p.m.	at No. 5 Auburn		Jordan–Hare Stadium; Auburn, AL	SECN	L 35–42	87,451
November 1	7:30 p.m.	Tennessee		Williams-Brice Stadium; Columbia, SC (rivalry)	SECN	L 42–45 ^{OT}	81,891
November 15	12:00 p.m.	at Florida		Ben Hill Griffin Stadium; Gainesville, FL	SECN	W 23–20 ^{OT}	85,088
November 22	12:00 p.m.	South Alabama*		Williams-Brice Stadium; Columbia, SC	SECRN	W 37–12	78,201
November 29	12:00 p.m.	at No. 21 Clemson*		Memorial Stadium; Clemson, SC (Palmetto Bowl)	ESPN	L 17–35	82,720
December 27	4:00 p.m.	vs. Miami (FL)*		Independence Stadium; Shreveport, LA (Independence Bowl)	ABC	W 24–21	38,242
*Non-conference game; ^{†}Homecoming; Rankings from AP Poll released prior to game; All times are in Eastern time

== Roster ==
2014 South Carolina Gamecocks roster
Quarterbacks: 5 Brendan Nosovitch – (redshirt) sophomore; 6 Connor Mitch – (redshirt) freshman; 10 Perry Orth – (redshirt) sophomore; 12 Michael Scarnecchia – freshman; 13 Grant Davitte – (redshirt) freshman; 15 Austin Hails – (redshirt) junior; 17 Dylan Thompson – (redshirt) senior; Running backs: 7 Shon Carson – (redshirt) junior; 22 Brandon Wilds – (redshirt) junior; 28 Mike Davis – junior; 32 Rod Talley – (redshirt) sophomore; 33 David Williams – (redshirt) junior; 49 Devin Potter – (redshirt) sophomore; Fullbacks: 30 Darius Paulk – freshman; 31 Jordan Diaz – (redshirt) senior; 41 Connor McLaurin – (redshirt) senior; 43 Garrison Gist – (redshirt) junior; 44 Gerald Turner – (redshirt) freshman; 45 Brandon Sturdivant – (redshirt) sophomore; Wide receivers: 1 Damiere Byrd – senior; 3 Nick Jones – (redshirt) senior; 4 Shaq Roland – junior; 8 Shamier Jeffery – (redshirt) junior; 9 Tyshun Samuel – freshman; 11 Pharoh Cooper – sophomore; 14 Shaq Davidson – freshman; 19 Terry Googer – freshman; 21 Andrew Bunch – (redshirt) sophomore; 29 Matrick Belton – (redshirt) sophomore; 80 K.J. Brent – (redshirt) junior; 82 Caleb Hines – freshman; 83 Carlton Heard – (redshirt) junior; 84 Matthew Harvey – (redshirt) junior; 85 Kane Whitehurst – junior; 87 Sean Odom – sophomore; Tight ends: 40 Jacob August – freshman; 48 Nick McGriff – freshman; 81 Rory Anderson – senior; 86 Kevin Crosby – freshman; 88 Drew Owens – (redshirt) junior; 89 Jerell Adams – junior	Offensive line: 50 A.J. Cann – (redshirt) senior; 51 Cody Waldrop – (redshirt) sophomore; 52 Bryce King – (redshirt) freshman; 53 Corey Robinson – (redshirt) senior; 54 Clayton Stadnik – (redshirt) sophomore; 55 Na’Ty Rodgers – (redshirt) freshman; 60 D.J. Park – (redshirt) freshman; 65 Brock Stadnik – (redshirt) sophomore; 70 Alan Knott – (redshirt) freshman; 71 Brandon Shell – (redshirt) junior; 72 Donell Stanley – freshman; 74 Mason Zandi – (redshirt) sophomore; 75 Will Sport – (redshirt) junior; 76 Mike Matulis – (redshirt) junior; 77 Malik Young – freshman; Defensive Line (DT): 52 Phillip Dukes – (redshirt) junior; 90 Taylor Stallworth – freshman; 92 Gerald Dixon Jr. – (redshirt) junior; 93 Deon Green – (redshirt) junior; 94 Kelsey Griffin – sophomore; 97 J.T. Surratt – (redshirt) senior; 99 Abu Lamin – (redshirt) sophomore; Defensive Line (DE): 5 Darius English – (redshirt) sophomore; 18 Cedrick Cooper – (redshirt) junior; 34 Mason Harris – (redshirt) junior; 44 Gerald Dixon – (redshirt) junior; 51 Devin Washington – (redshirt) freshman; 55 David Johnson – (redshirt) freshman; 91 Blake McClain – freshman; 95 Michael Washington – (redshirt) junior	Linebackers: 4 Bryson Allen-Williams – freshman; 8 Kaiwan Lewis – junior; 10 Skai Moore – sophomore; 11 T.J. Holloman – (redshirt) sophomore; 21 Marquis Roberts – (redshirt) sophomore; 28 Jonathon Walton – sophomore; 41 Kyle Morini – (redshirt) senior; Spurs: 9 Sharrod Golightly – (redshirt) senior; 23 Larenz Bryant – sophomore; 42 Jordan Diggs – (redshirt) sophomore; 46 Cedrick Malone – (redshirt) sophomore; Defensive backs: 1 Rico McWilliams – (redshirt) sophomore; 3 Chris Lammons – freshman; 7 Wesley Green – freshman; 14 Ali Groves – (redshirt) freshman; 15 Al Harris Jr. – freshman; 22 Jamari Smith – sophomore; 24 D.J. Smith – freshman; 30 Sidney Rhodes – (redshirt) senior; 35 Shannon James – (redshirt) sophomore; 39 Demetrius Smalls – (redshirt) freshman; 43 Benjamin Russell – (redshirt) freshman; Safeties: 6 Chris Moody – (redshirt) sophomore; 12 Brison Williams – senior; 17 Chaz Elder – (redshirt) sophomore; 20 T.J. Gurley – junior; 25 Kadetrix Marcus – senior; 26 Jasper Sasser – (redshirt) freshman; 49 Devin Potter – (redshirt) sophomore	Punters: 13 Tyler Hull – (redshirt) senior; 18 Patrick Fish – (redshirt) senior; Placekickers: 16 Zach Cimaglia – (redshirt) sophomore; 19 Landon Ard – (redshirt) junior; 29 Elliot Fry – sophomore; Long snappers: 47 Drew Williams – sophomore; 58 Ryland Culberson – (redshirt) senior; 59 Coleman Harley – (redshirt) junior

== Depth chart ==
For: 8/28/14 (Texas A&M)

Defense

FS
17 Chaz Elder
20 T.J. Gurley

WLB	MLB	SLB
⋅	11 T.J. Holloman	⋅
28 Jonathan Walton	8 Kaiwan Lewis	⋅

SS
6 Chris Moody
25 Kadetrix Marcus

CB
12 Brison Williams
3 Chris Lammons

DE	DT	DT	DE
44 Gerald Dixon	97 J.T. Surratt	92 Gerald Dixon Jr.	5 Darius English
34 Mason Harris	52 Philip Dukes	99 Abu Lammin	55 David Johnson

CB
31 Al Harris Jr.
1 Rico McWilliams

Offense

"X" WR
4 Shaq Roland
1 Damiere Byrd

"Z" WR
11 Pharaoh Cooper
80 K.J. Brent

LT	LG	C	RG	RT
53 Corey Robinson	50 A.J. Cann	54 Clayton Stadnik	51 Cody Waldrop	71 Brandon Shell
74 Mason Zandi	65 Brock Stadnik	75 Will Sport	70 Alan Knott	55 Na'ty Rodgers

TE
81 Rory Anderson
89 Jerell Adams

"B" WR
3 Nick Jones
83 Carlton Heard

QB
17 Dylan Thompson
6 Connor Mitch

Key reserves
QB 10 Perry Orth
TE 88 Drew Owens
LB 21 Marquis Roberts
WR 85 Kane Whitehurst
WR 8 Shamier Jeffery
WR 80 K.J. Brent
HB 7 Shon Carson
QB 5 Brendan Nosovitch

RB
28 Mike Davis
22 Brandon Wilds

Special teams
PK 29 Elliot Fry
PK 19 Landon Ard
P 13 Tyler Hull
P 18 Patrick Fish
KR 11 Pharoh Cooper
PR 11 Pharoh Cooper
LS 47 Drew Williams
H 18 Patrick Fish

== Game summaries ==
=== Texas A&M ===
#21 Texas A&M Aggies at #9 South Carolina Gamecocks – Game summary

Quarter	1	2	3	4	Total
#21 Texas A&M	10	21	14	7	52
#9 South Carolina	7	7	14	0	28

at Williams-Brice Stadium • Columbia, South Carolina

- Date: August 28, 2014
- Game time: 6:00 p.m. EDT
- Game weather: Temperature: • Wind: • Weather:
- Game attendance: 82,847
- TV announcers (SEC Network): Brent Musburger, Jesse Palmer, Maria Taylor, & Kaylee Hartung

Game information

First Quarter

Second Quarter

Third Quarter

Fourth Quarter

Passing

- TAMU –
- SC –

Rushing

- TAMU –
- SC –

Receiving

- TAMU –
- SC –

Tackling

- TAMU –
- SC –

The Gamecocks open the 2014 season with a Thursday night matchup against conference foe Texas A&M. It will be the first meeting between the two schools. With kickoff set for 6:00 p.m. EDT, this game was scheduled to be the first live football game broadcast on the SEC Network. As the first game of the Gamecocks-Aggies cross-division rivalry, the winner of this game will be awarded the new Bonham Trophy, named after Alamo war hero and South Carolina alumnus James Butler Bonham.

=== East Carolina ===
East Carolina Pirates at South Carolina Gamecocks – Game summary

Quarter	1	2	3	4	Total
East Carolina	6	10	0	7	23
#21 South Carolina	7	13	10	3	33

at Williams-Brice Stadium • Columbia, South Carolina

- Date: September 6, 2014
- Game time: 7:00 p.m. EDT
- Game weather: Temperature: • Wind: • Weather:
- Game attendance: 80,899
- TV announcers (ESPN2/ESPNU): Anish Shroff, Kelly Stouffer, & Cara Capuano

Game information

First Quarter

Second Quarter

Third Quarter

Fourth Quarter

Passing

- ECU –
- SC –

Rushing

- ECU –
- SC –

Receiving

- ECU –
- SC –

Tackling

- ECU –
- SC –

South Carolina hosts East Carolina for Week 2 of the college football season. The Gamecocks hold a 12-5 all-time series record against the Pirates. South Carolina won the most recent matchup in 2012 by a score of 48–10. It was the first career start for then-backup QB Dylan Thompson, who threw for 330 yards with 3 touchdowns and no interceptions in the victory.

=== Georgia ===
Georgia Bulldogs at South Carolina Gamecocks – Game summary

Quarter	1	2	3	4	Total
#6 Georgia	10	3	7	15	35
#24 South Carolina	14	10	7	7	38

at Williams-Brice Stadium • Columbia, South Carolina

- Date: September 13, 2014
- Game time: 3:30 p.m. EDT
- Game weather: Temperature: • Wind: • Weather:
- Game attendance: 84,232
- TV announcers (CBS): Verne Lundquist, Gary Danielson, & Allie LaForce

Game information

First Quarter

Second Quarter

Third Quarter

Fourth Quarter

Passing

- UGA –
- SC –

Rushing

- UGA –
- SC –

Receiving

- UGA –
- SC –

Tackling

- UGA –
- SC –

The SEC East rival Georgia Bulldogs visit South Carolina on September 13, 2014, to conclude the Gamecocks three-game homestand. Georgia leads the all-time series 48-17-2; however, the Gamecocks have won three of the last four matchups, including a dominating 35–7 victory in the last meeting at Williams-Brice Stadium. The Bulldogs won last year's matchup 41–30 in Athens, Georgia behind a 4 touchdown performance by Aaron Murray.

=== Vanderbilt ===
South Carolina Gamecocks at Vanderbilt Commodores – Game summary

Quarter	1	2	3	4	Total
#14 South Carolina	0	17	10	21	48
Vanderbilt	14	0	10	10	34

at Vanderbilt Stadium • Nashville, Tennessee

- Date: September 20, 2014
- Game time: 7:30
- Game weather: Temperature: • Wind: • Weather:
- Game attendance: 34,441
- TV announcers (SECN): Brent Musburger, Jesse Palmer, & Maria Taylor

Game information

First Quarter

Second Quarter

Third Quarter

Fourth Quarter

Passing

- SC –
- VU –

Rushing

- SC –
- VU –

Receiving

- SC –
- VU –

Tackling

- SC –
- VU –

South Carolina travels to Vanderbilt for the first road game of the 2014 season. South Carolina holds a 19-4 all-time series record against the Commodores, and has won the last five meetings.

=== Missouri ===
Missouri Tigers at South Carolina Gamecocks – Game summary

Quarter	1	2	3	4	Total
Missouri	7	0	0	14	21
#13 South Carolina	3	7	3	7	20

at Williams-Brice Stadium • Columbia, South Carolina

- Date: September 27, 2014
- Game time: 7:00 p.m. EDT
- Game weather: Temperature: 74 °F (23 °C) • Wind: NE 5 5 mph (8.0 km/h) • Weather: Partly Cloudy
- Game attendance: 83,493
- Referee: Ken Williamson
- TV announcers (ESPN): Brad Nessler, Todd Blackledge, & Holly Rowe

Game information

First Quarter

- (12:06) MIZZ – (MIZZ 7-0) - Russell Hansbrough 18 yard run (Andrew Baggett kick)
- (2:07) SC – (MIZZ 7-3) - 33 yard kick by Elliot Fry

Second Quarter

- (1:36) SC – (SC 10-7) - Mike Davis 17 yard run (Elliot Fry kick)

Third Quarter

- (6:38) SC – (SC 13–7) - 41 yard kick by Elliot Fry

Fourth Quarter

- (7:25) SC – (SC 20–7) - Pharoh Cooper 23 yard pass from Dylan Thompson (Elliot Fry kick)
- (6:49) MIZZ – (SC 20–14) - Russell Hansbrough 1 yard run (Andrew Baggett kick)
- (1:36) MIZZ – (MIZZ 21-20) - Russell Hansbrough 1 yard run (Andrew Baggett kick)

Passing

- MIZZ – Maty Mauk – 12/34, 132 yards
- SC – Dylan Thompson – 21/37, 219 yards, TD

Rushing

- MIZZ – Marcus Murphy – 16 carries, 98 yards
- SC – Mike Davis – 22 carries, 104 yards, TD

Receiving

- MIZZ – Bud Sasser – 6 receptions, 86 yards
- SC – Nick Jones – 5 receptions, 72 yards

Tackling

- MIZZ – Kentry Brothers – 10 tackles, 2 TFL
- SC – J. T. Surratt – 7 tackles, 1.5 TFL, 1 sack

The Gamecocks host the defending SEC East division champion Missouri Tigers for the 2014 Battle of Columbia. The all-time series record is tied at two wins apiece. South Carolina, however, has won both meetings since Missouri joined the SEC in 2012. Last year's meeting saw Gamecocks QB Connor Shaw lead a 17-point, fourth quarter comeback in Columbia, Missouri to send the game into overtime. The Gamecocks would go on to win in double overtime, becoming the only team to defeat the Tigers in the regular season. The winner of this game receives the Mayors’ Cup Trophy.

=== Kentucky ===
South Carolina Gamecocks at Kentucky Wildcats – Game summary

Quarter	1	2	3	4	Total
South Carolina	7	10	14	7	38
Kentucky	0	17	7	21	45

at Commonwealth Stadium • Lexington, Kentucky

- Date: October 4, 2014
- Game time: 7:30
- Game weather: Temperature: • Wind: • Weather:
- Game attendance: 62,135
- TV announcers (SECN): Tom Hart, Matt Stinchcomb, & Heather Mitts

Game information

First Quarter

Second Quarter

Third Quarter

Fourth Quarter

Passing

- SC –
- UK –

Rushing

- SC –
- UK –

Receiving

- SC –
- UK –

Tackling

- SC –
- UK –

South Carolina's second road test of the season takes place in Lexington, Kentucky against SEC East foe Kentucky. South Carolina leads the all-time series 17-7-1. The Gamecocks have won the last three meetings, including last year's 35–28 win at home.

=== Furman ===
Furman Paladins at South Carolina Gamecocks – Game summary

Quarter	1	2	3	4	Total
Furman	7	0	3	0	10
South Carolina	14	14	10	3	41

at Williams-Brice Stadium • Columbia, South Carolina

- Date: October 18, 2014
- Game time: 12:00
- Game weather: Temperature: • Wind: • Weather:
- Game attendance: 78,101
- TV announcers (SECN): Tom Hart, Matt Stinchcomb, & Kayce Smith

Game information

First Quarter

Second Quarter

Third Quarter

Fourth Quarter

Passing

- FU –
- SC –

Rushing

- FU –
- SC –

Receiving

- FU –
- SC –

Tackling

- FU –
- SC –

In-state FCS team Furman comes to Columbia in Week 8 with the Gamecocks coming off of a bye week.

=== Auburn ===
South Carolina Gamecocks at Auburn Tigers – Game summary

Quarter	1	2	3	4	Total
South Carolina	7	14	14	0	35
#4 Auburn	7	14	14	7	42

at Jordan–Hare Stadium • Auburn, Alabama

- Date: October 25, 2014
- Game time: 7:30
- Game weather: Temperature: • Wind: • Weather:
- Game attendance: 87,451
- TV announcers (SECN): Brent Musburger, Jesse Palmer, & Maria Taylor

Game information

First Quarter

Second Quarter

Third Quarter

Fourth Quarter

Passing

- SC –
- AU –

Rushing

- SC –
- AU –

Receiving

- SC –
- AU –

Tackling

- SC –
- AU –

South Carolina visits the defending SEC champion Auburn Tigers on October 25, 2014. Auburn leads the all-time series 9-1-1. Auburn has won all seven matchups since South Carolina joined the SEC in 1992, including the 2010 SEC Championship Game.

=== Tennessee ===
Tennessee Volunteers at South Carolina Gamecocks – Game summary

Quarter	1	2	3	4	OT	Total
Tennessee	7	14	0	21	3	45
South Carolina	7	7	14	14	0	42

at Williams-Brice Stadium • Columbia, South Carolina

- Date: November 1, 2014
- Game time: 7:30
- Game weather: Temperature: • Wind: • Weather:
- Game attendance: 81,891
- TV announcers (SECN): Tom Hart, Matt Stinchcomb, & Heather Mitts

Game information

First Quarter

Second Quarter

Third Quarter

Fourth Quarter

Passing

- UT –
- SC –

Rushing

- UT –
- SC –

Receiving

- UT –
- SC –

Tackling

- UT –
- SC –

The Gamecocks host SEC East rival Tennessee for the ninth game of the 2014 season. Tennessee leads the all-time series 23-7-2, but South Carolina has won three of the last four meetings. South Carolina will look to avenge last year's matchup in Knoxville, Tennessee when the Volunteers handed the Gamecocks their second and final loss of the 2013 season, made possible by a one-handed catch by WR Marquez North to set up a game-winning field goal. The loss eventually cost South Carolina the SEC Eastern Division title and a trip to the SEC Championship game.

=== Florida ===
South Carolina Gamecocks at Florida Gators – Game summary

Quarter	1	2	3	4	OT	Total
South Carolina	10	0	0	7	6	23
Florida	0	10	7	0	3	20

at Ben Hill Griffin Stadium • Gainesville, Florida

- Date: November 15, 2014
- Game time: 12:00
- Game weather: Temperature: • Wind: • Weather:
- Game attendance: 85,088
- TV announcers (SECN): Dave Neal, Andre Ware, & Laura Rutledge

Game information

First Quarter

Second Quarter

Third Quarter

Fourth Quarter

Passing

- SC –
- UF –

Rushing

- SC –
- UF –

Receiving

- SC –
- UF –

Tackling

- SC –
- UF –

South Carolina comes off their second bye week with a trip to Gainesville, Florida to take on the Florida Gators in the final SEC game of the season. The Gators lead the all-time series 24-7-3; however, the Gamecocks have won three of the last four meetings. Four of the Gamecocks’ seven wins against Florida have come since Gator legend Steve Spurrier took over as head coach in 2005. South Carolina's last win in Gainesville took place in 2010 in a game that clinched the Gamecocks’ first SEC East division title.

=== South Alabama ===
South Alabama Jaguars at South Carolina Gamecocks – Game summary

Quarter	1	2	3	4	Total
South Alabama	3	6	0	3	12
South Carolina	10	7	6	14	37

at Williams-Brice Stadium • Columbia, South Carolina

- Date: November 22, 2014
- Game time: 12:00
- Game weather: Temperature: • Wind: • Weather:
- Game attendance: 78,201
- TV announcers (FSN): Bob Rathbun, Tim Couch, & Olivia Harlan

Game information

First Quarter

Second Quarter

Third Quarter

Fourth Quarter

Passing

- USA –
- SC –

Rushing

- USA –
- SC –

Receiving

- USA –
- SC –

Tackling

- USA –
- SC –

South Carolina hosts its final home game of the 2014 season against the South Alabama Jaguars. It will be the first meeting between the two schools.

=== Clemson ===
South Carolina Gamecocks at Clemson Tigers – Game summary

Quarter	1	2	3	4	Total
South Carolina	7	3	0	7	17
Clemson	7	14	7	7	35

at Memorial Stadium • Clemson, South Carolina

- Date: November 29, 2014
- Game time: 12:00
- Game weather: Temperature: • Wind: • Weather:
- Game attendance:
- TV announcers (ESPN): Steve Levy, Kelly Stouffer, & Dawn Davenport

Game information

17-35

First Quarter

Second Quarter

Third Quarter

Fourth Quarter

Passing

- SC –
- CU –

Rushing

- SC –
- CU –

Receiving

- SC –
- CU –

Tackling

- SC –
- CU –

South Carolina travels to Clemson, South Carolina for the 112th Battle of the Palmetto State. Clemson leads the all-time series 65-42-4; however, South Carolina has controlled the heated rivalry series as of late, winning the last five meetings by an average margin of 16.8 points. The Gamecocks’ five game winning streak is Carolina's longest winning streak in the series. Steve Spurrier is 6–3 against the Tigers since taking over as head coach in 2005. Gamecock QB Dylan Thompson made his second career start in the last matchup at Memorial Stadium, replacing injured QB Connor Shaw. Thompson threw for 249 yards with 1 touchdown in the 35–17 loss to the Tigers.

== Rankings ==
Ranking movements Legend: ██ Increase in ranking ██ Decrease in ranking — = Not ranked RV = Received votes ( ) = First-place votes
	Week																
Poll	Pre	1	2	3	4	5	6	7	8	9	10	11	12	13	14	15	Final
AP	9	21	24	14	13	RV	RV	RV	—	—	—	—	—	—	—	—	—
Coaches	9 (1)	21	23	16	15	RV	—	—	—	—	—	—	—	—	—	—	—
CFP	Not released									—	—	—	—	—	—	—	Not released
