= 2015 NFL draft =

Selection of American football players

General information
- Date: April 30 – May 2
- Location: Auditorium Theatre in Chicago, Illinois, U.S.
- Networks: ESPN, ESPN2, NFL Network

Overview
- 256 total selections in 7 rounds
- League: NFL
- First selection: Jameis Winston, QB; Tampa Bay Buccaneers
- Mr. Irrelevant: Gerald Christian, TE; Arizona Cardinals
- Most selections (12): Cleveland Browns
- Fewest selections (5): Carolina Panthers; San Diego Chargers

The 2015 NFL draft was the 80th annual meeting of National Football League (NFL) franchises to select newly eligible football players. It took place in Chicago at the Auditorium Theatre and in Grant Park, from April 30 to May 2. This was the first NFL draft held outside New York City in fifty years (since the 1965 NFL draft). The 2015 NFL draft was the first to feature a companion outdoor fair, where fans would be able to see the Commissioner during the selection on the Auditorium Theatre stage from across the street in the park; this area was called Draft Town. The Tampa Bay Buccaneers held the right to the first overall pick because they had the league's worst record in the previous season, and used it to select the 2013 Heisman Trophy winning quarterback Jameis Winston out of Florida State. The Arizona Cardinals made the final pick in the draft, commonly called Mr. Irrelevant, by selecting tight end Gerald Christian out of Louisville with the two-hundred and fifty-sixth pick.

One of the major storylines approaching the NFL draft was the competition between the previous two Heisman Trophy winners, Jameis Winston winning the award in 2013 and Marcus Mariota in 2014. Both were considered excellent prospects and had the potential to become the first overall draft selection. Winston was considered to be a more polished pocket passer and pro-style quarterback, but had several off-the-field issues while playing at Florida State, ranging from a sexual assault allegation to shoplifting incidents. Mariota was considered a better athlete, the fastest quarterback in the draft and had a better off-field reputation. However, Mariota ran a spread offense at Oregon which typically had not transitioned well from college to the NFL. Although neither was considered a perfectly safe pick, the two quarterbacks were selected first and second overall. This was only the sixth time in NFL history that this had occurred; it previously happened 1971, 1993, 1998, 1999 and 2012, although it has since occurred in 2016, 2021, 2023 and 2024. It was also the first time that two Heisman Trophy winners were selected with the first two overall picks.

== Event logistics ==
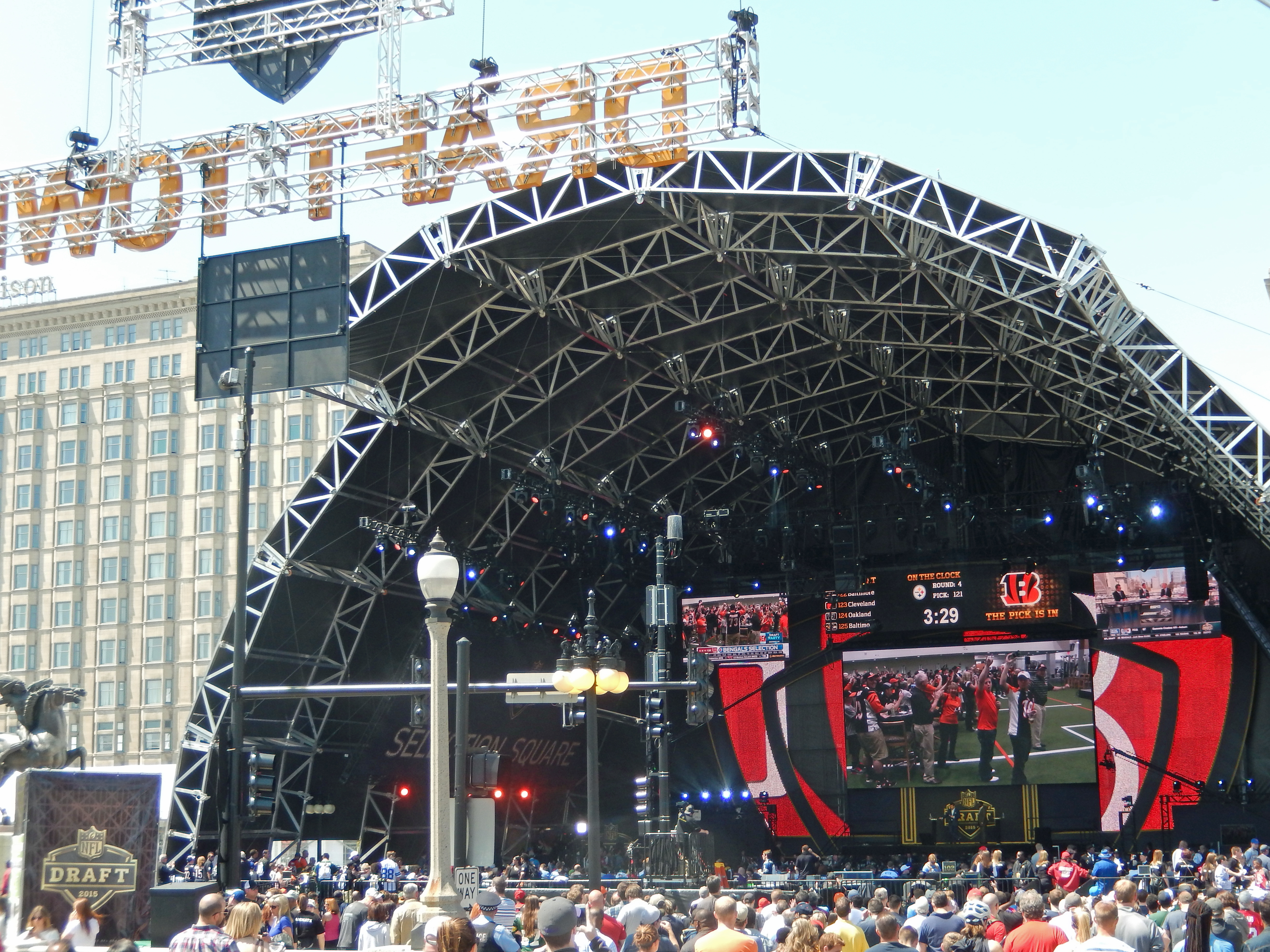
"Selection Square" at Congress Plaza in Grant Park

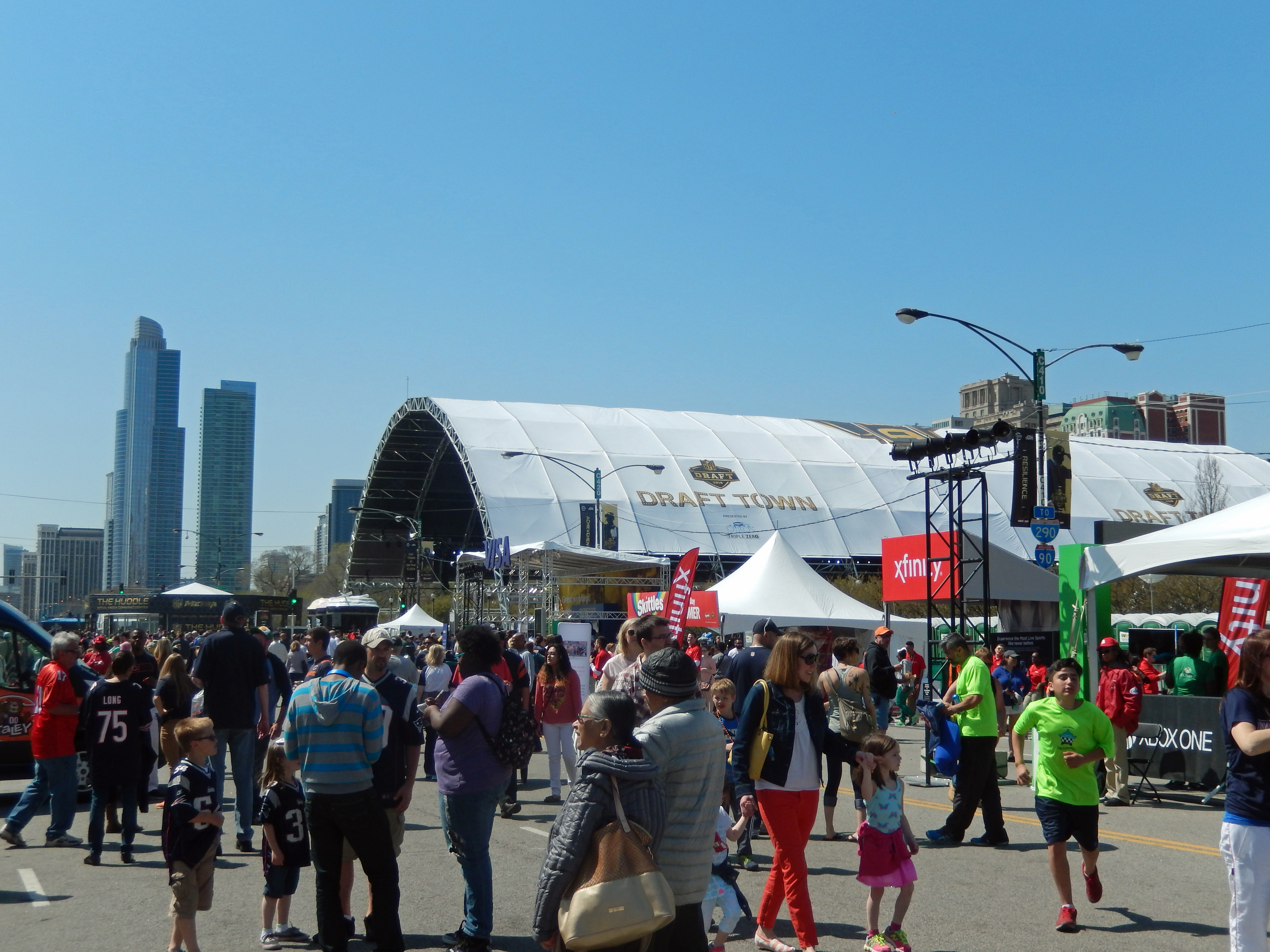
"Draft Town" in Grant Park

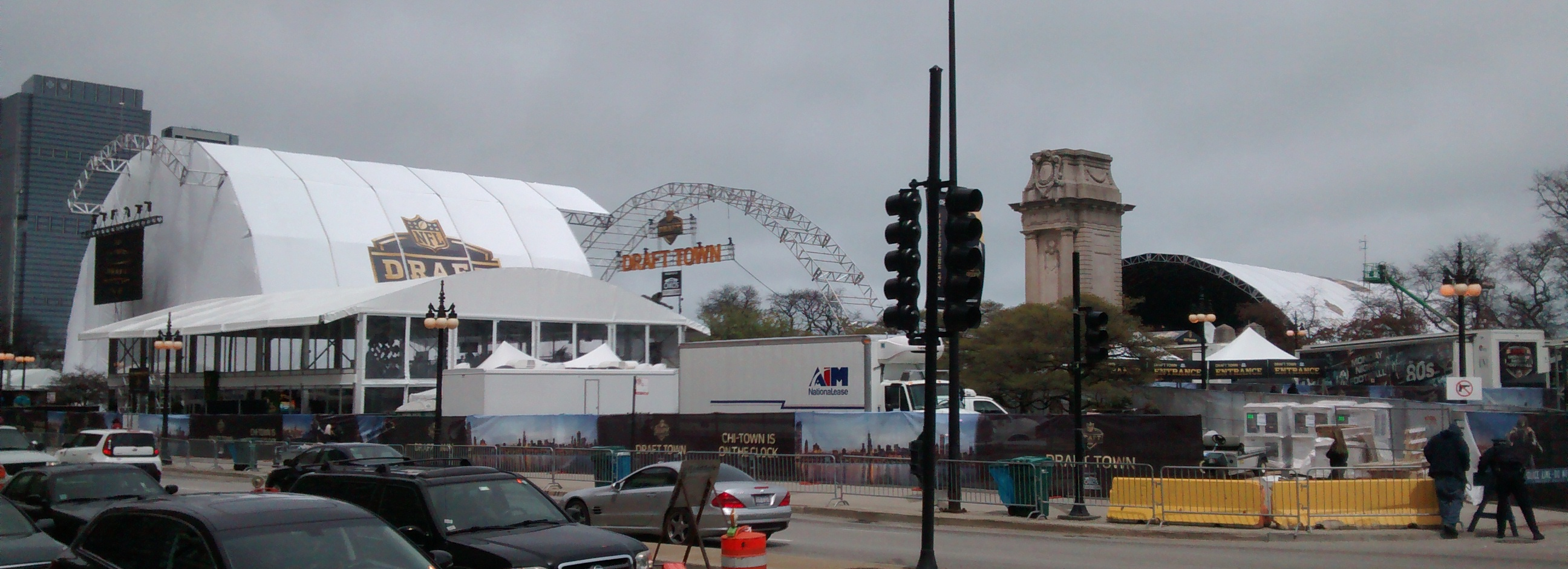
Draft Town and Selection Square seen from Michigan Avenue

Prior to 2015, despite having become a major annual television event for the NFL, drafts had only been held with a limited and relatively-small in-person attendance, and had been held exclusively in New York City since 1965.

After the management of the event's longtime venue, Radio City Music Hall, had forced the league to postpone their 2014 draft due to a scheduling conflict at the venue, the NFL grew frustrated with the venue and decided to open-up bidding for a new site to host its 2015 draft. The league asked for bids not only to include a venue for the draft itself, but to also present an adjacent venue (either indoor or outdoor) in which the league could host a fan festival. The league received interest from 12 possible host cities, but zeroed in on bids from Chicago, Los Angeles and New York City. New York City was proposing potentially keeping the event at Radio City Music Hall or moving it to another venue such as Madison Square Garden. Radio City Music Hall and Madison Square Garden both shared the same ownership – MSG. The NFL quickly narrowed their selection further to either Chicago or Los Angeles.

Among the venues proposed in Chicago included the Chicago Theatre (owned by MSG), Soldier Field and McCormick Place. Among the venues proposed in the Los Angeles metro area included The Forum (owned by MSG), Nokia Theatre at L.A. Live, Dolby Theatre, TCL Chinese Theatre and the Walt Disney Concert Hall. In October 2014, NFL Commissioner Roger Goodell announced that the city of Chicago would host the draft at the Auditorium Theatre, with parts of Grant Park (including Congress Plaza) to be the location of a fan fest.

In organizing the event, Chicago reimagined the draft into a much larger event than it previously had been and made it accessible for the first time to a large public attendance. Across the street from the Auditorium Theatre in Grant Park, a large free-admission multi-day fan festival dubbed "Draft Town" was erected. The festival that drew 200,000 visitors. Within the grounds of the festival, fans could watch live footage of the first three rounds draft from within the festival. While the first three rounds of the draft still took place inside an indoor venue (the Auditorium Theatre), the final round of the draft were held outdoors before an open-admittance crowd in an area of the festival dubbed "Selection Square". Subsequent drafts have retained the large-scale attendance and festivities pioneered for the 2015 draft.

== Timing changes ==
Shortly before the draft, the NFL shortened the amount of time for certain selections to be made. The time for seventh-round selections was reduced from five minutes to four minutes; similarly, the time for all compensatory selections, which cannot be traded, was reduced from seven minutes to four minutes.

== Early entrants ==
Seventy-four underclassmen announced their intention to forgo their remaining NCAA eligibility and declare themselves available to be selected in the draft. An additional ten players who graduated but were still eligible to play college football chose to enter the draft, bringing to 84 the total number of players who chose to forgo college eligibility to enter the draft.

== Overview ==
The following is the breakdown of the 256 players selected by position:

- 34 linebackers
- 35 wide receivers
- 30 cornerbacks
- 24 offensive tackles
- 23 defensive ends
- 18 running backs
- 4 fullbacks
- 19 tight ends
- 16 guards
- 16 safeties
- 20 defensive tackles
- 7 quarterbacks
- 6 centers
- 1 long snapper
- 1 punter

== Selection order ==
The draft order is based generally on each team's record from the previous season, with teams which qualified for the postseason selecting after those which failed to make the playoffs. The Tampa Bay Buccaneers and Tennessee Titans each finished 2014 with league-worst 2–14 records. The Buccaneers were awarded the first pick in round one due to having a worse strength of schedule. The selection order for subsequent rounds follows the order of the first round, except that teams with the similar records (and the same playoff result for playoff teams) rotate selections round-by-round (e.g. the Titans picked first in the second round).

In addition to the seven picks each team is given (one in each round), the league allocated thirty-two (32) supplemental picks at the ends of round 3 through 7, for a total of 256 picks. The supplemental picks are awarded to teams who had net losses of free agent talent from the previous year.

== Player selections ==
*	compensatory selection
†	Pro Bowler (Note: Players are identified as a Pro Bowler if they were selected for the Pro Bowl at any time in their career.)

Positions key
Offense	Defense	Special teams
QB — Quarterback; RB — Running back; FB — Fullback; WR — Wide receiver; TE — Tight end; OL — Offensive lineman; T — Tackle; G — Guard; C — Center	DL — Defensive lineman; DT — Defensive tackle (Note: Includes nose tackle (NT)); DE — Defensive end; EDGE — Edge rusher; LB — Linebacker (Note: Includes middle linebacker (MLB/MIKE), weakside linebacker (WILL), strongside linebacker (SAM), off-ball linebacker, and outside linebacker (OLB)); DB — Defensive back; CB — Cornerback; S — Safety (Note: Includes free safety (FS) and strong safety (SS))	K — Kicker (Note: Also known as a placekicker (PK)); P — Punter; LS — Long snapper; RS — Return specialist (Note: Includes kickoff and punt returners)

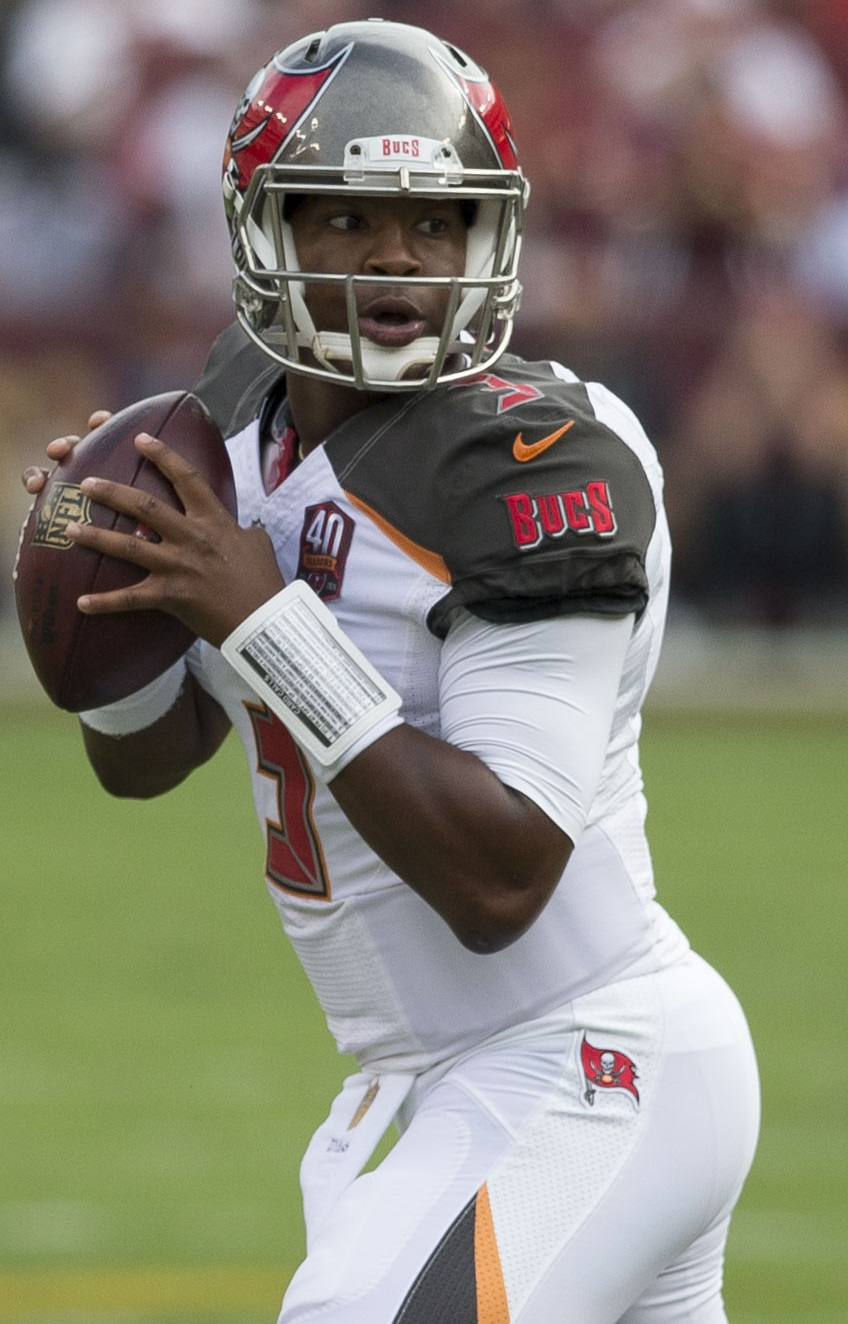
Quarterback Jameis Winston, taken first overall by Tampa Bay, broke several passing records but struggled with turnovers during his tenure with the Buccaneers.

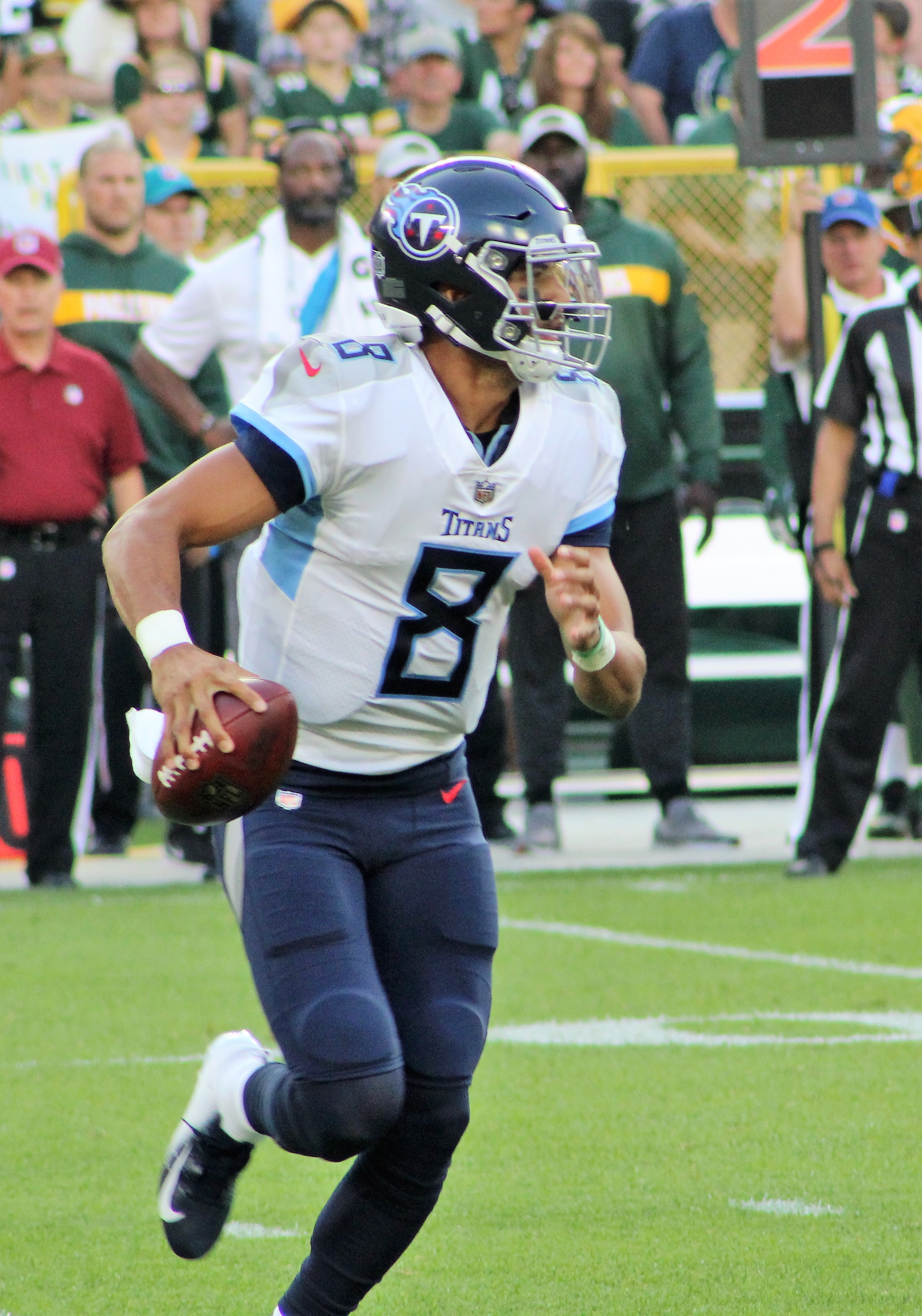
Quarterback Marcus Mariota was taken second overall by Tennessee and played with them for five seasons before signing with the Las Vegas Raiders in 2020

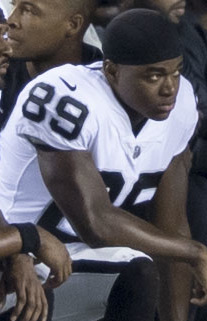
Five-time Pro Bowl receiver Amari Cooper was taken fourth overall by the Oakland Raiders before being traded to Dallas.

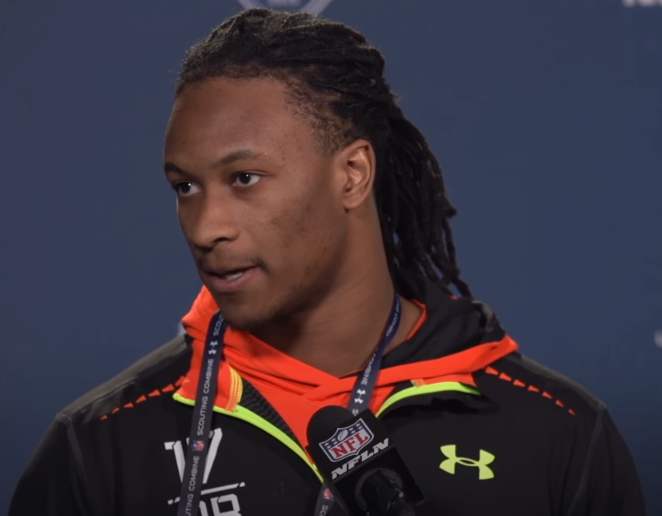
Running back Todd Gurley, taken by the St. Louis Rams 10th overall, led the league in rushing twice and received numerous Pro Bowl and All-Pro honors before being hampered by injuries.

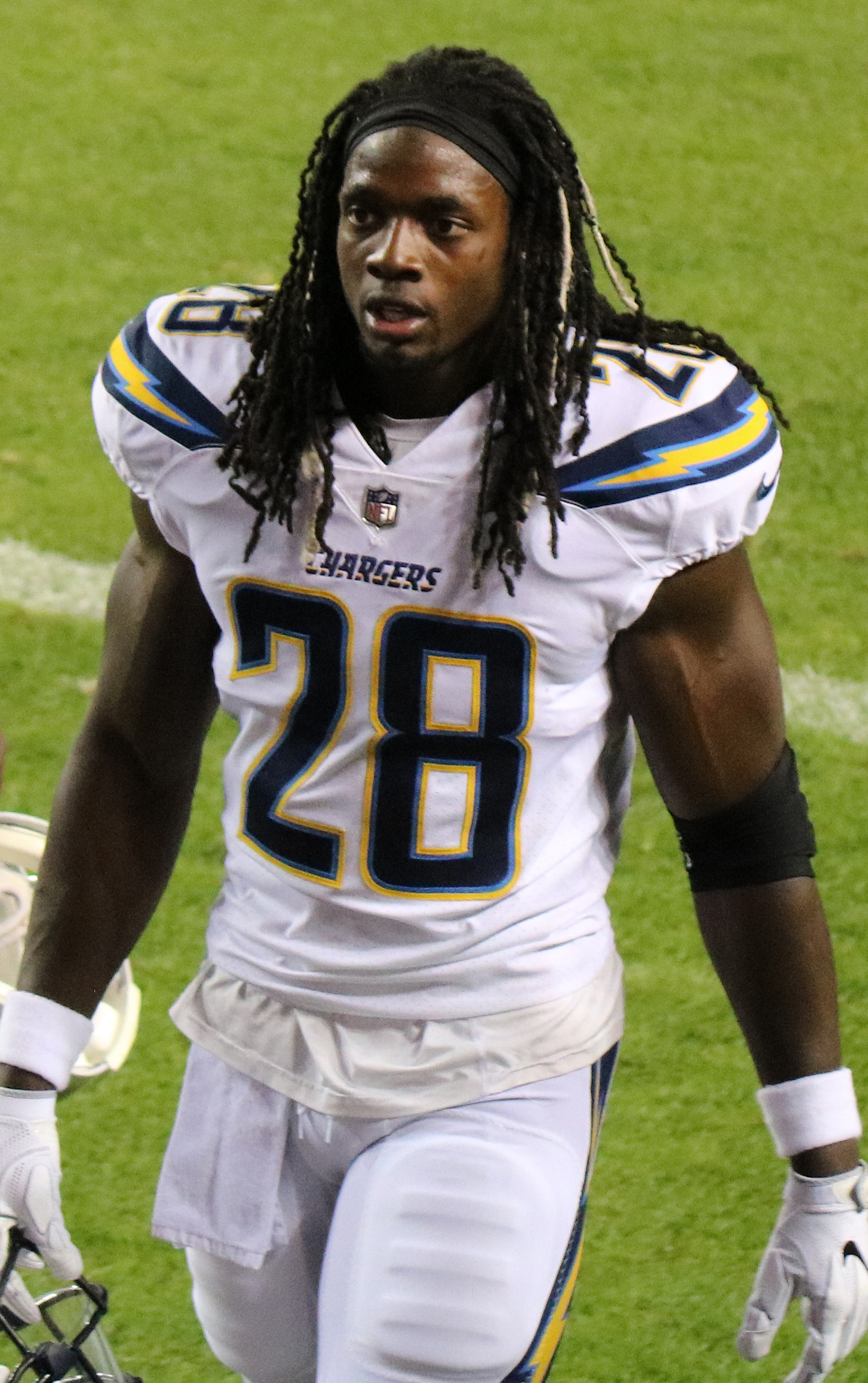
Two-time Pro Bowl running back Melvin Gordon, taken 15th overall by the San Diego Chargers

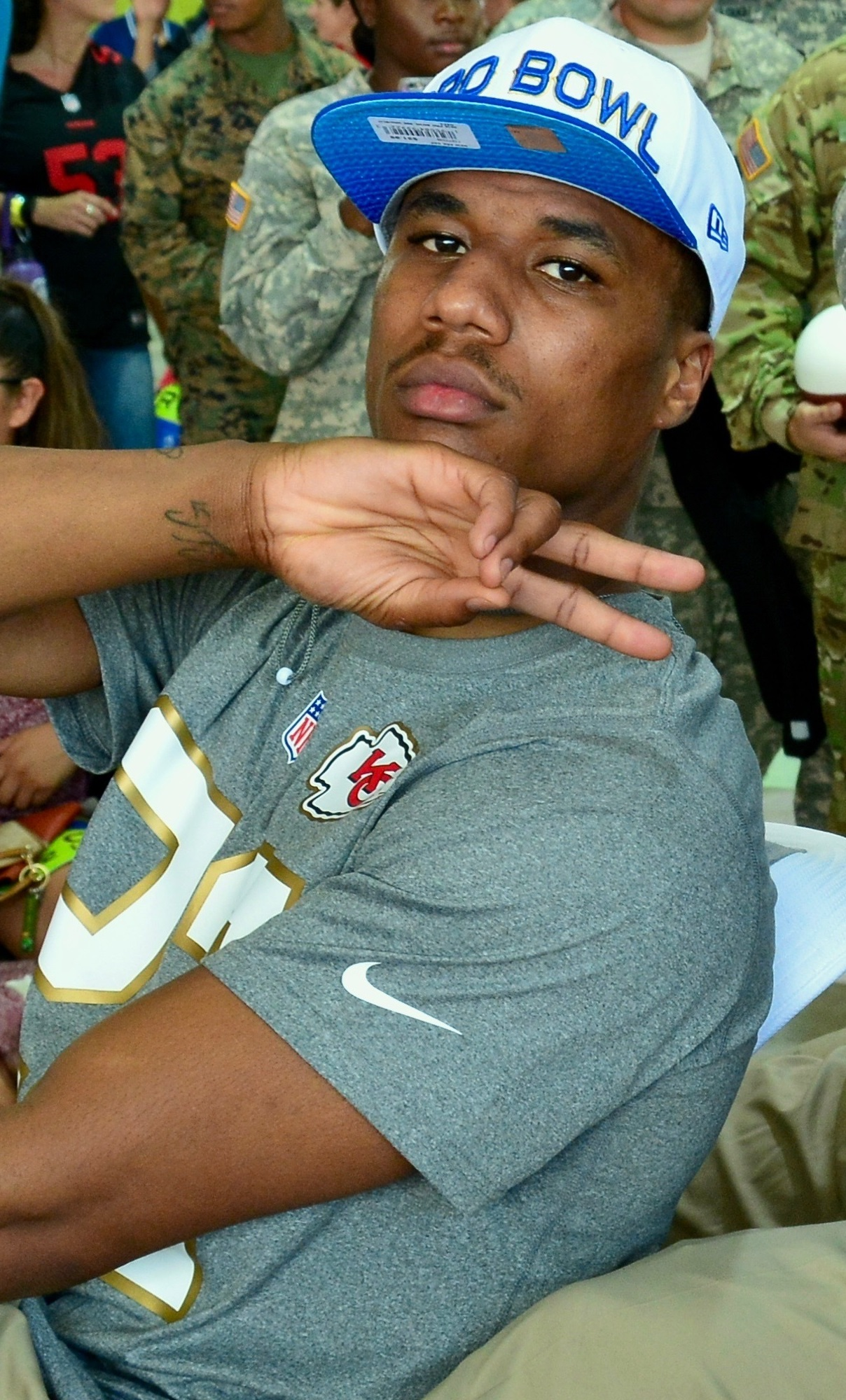
Marcus Peters emerged as one of the league's top cornerbacks after his selection by Kansas City, but has been traded several times.

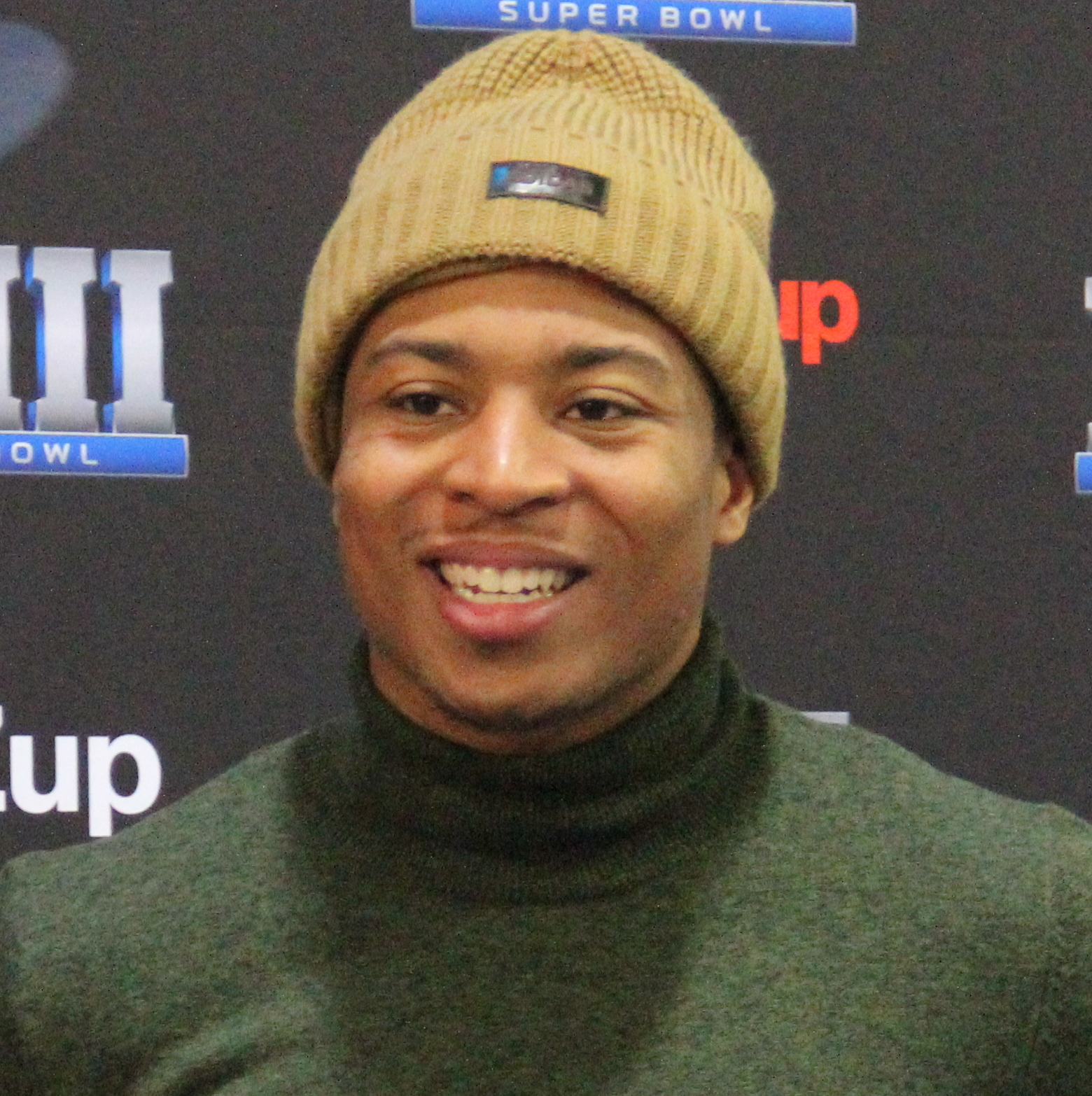
Receiver/special teamer Tyler Lockett, a third-round selection by Seattle

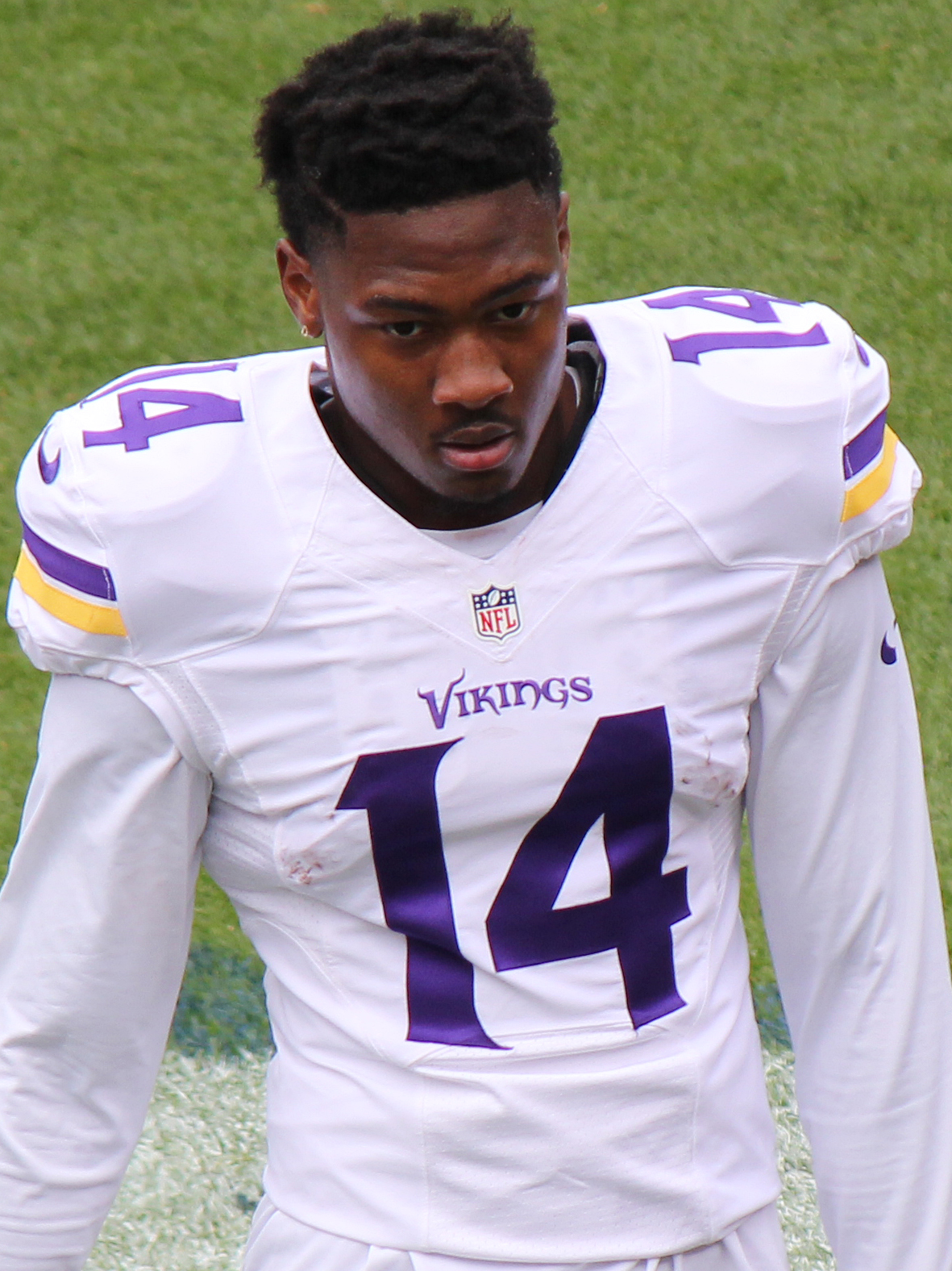
Despite being a 5th round pick, Stefon Diggs led the league in receptions and receiving yards in 2020.

Rnd.	Pick	Team	Player	Pos.	College	Notes
1	1	Tampa Bay Buccaneers	Jameis Winston ^{†}	QB	Florida State	2013 Heisman Trophy winner
1	2	Tennessee Titans	Marcus Mariota	QB	Oregon	2014 Heisman Trophy winner
1	3	Jacksonville Jaguars	Dante Fowler	DE	Florida	
1	4	Oakland Raiders	Amari Cooper ^{†}	WR	Alabama	2014 Fred Biletnikoff Award winner
1	5	Washington Redskins	Brandon Scherff ^{†}	T	Iowa	2014 Outland Trophy winner
1	6	New York Jets	Leonard Williams ^{†}	DE	USC	
1	7	Chicago Bears	Kevin White	WR	West Virginia	
1	8	Atlanta Falcons	Vic Beasley ^{†}	DE	Clemson	
1	9	New York Giants	Ereck Flowers	T	Miami (FL)	
1	10	St. Louis Rams	Todd Gurley ^{†}	RB	Georgia	
1	11	Minnesota Vikings	Trae Waynes	CB	Michigan State	
1	12	Cleveland Browns	Danny Shelton	DT	Washington	
1	13	New Orleans Saints	Andrus Peat ^{†}	T	Stanford	
1	14	Miami Dolphins	DeVante Parker	WR	Louisville	
1	15	San Diego Chargers	Melvin Gordon ^{†}	RB	Wisconsin	from San Francisco (Note: No. 15: San Francisco → San Diego (D). San Francisco traded a first-round selection (15th overall) to San Diego in exchange for first- and fourth-round selections (17th and 117th overall), and a 2016 fifth-round selection;); 2014 Doak Walker Award winner
1	16	Houston Texans	Kevin Johnson	CB	Wake Forest	
1	17	San Francisco 49ers	Arik Armstead	DE	Oregon	from San Diego (Note: No. 17: San Diego → San Francisco (D). See Round 1: San Francisco → San Diego.)
1	18	Kansas City Chiefs	Marcus Peters ^{†}	CB	Washington	
1	19	Cleveland Browns	Cameron Erving	C	Florida State	from Buffalo (Note: No. 19: Buffalo → Cleveland (PD). Buffalo traded first- and fourth-round selections (19th and 115th overall), and a 2014 first-round selection to Cleveland in exchange for a 2014 first-round selection.)
1	20	Philadelphia Eagles	Nelson Agholor	WR	USC	
1	21	Cincinnati Bengals	Cedric Ogbuehi	T	Texas A&M	
1	22	Pittsburgh Steelers	Bud Dupree	LB	Kentucky	
1	23	Denver Broncos	Shane Ray	DE	Missouri	from Detroit (Note: No. 23: Detroit → Denver (D). Detroit traded a first-round selection (23rd overall) to Denver in exchange for first- and fifth-round selections (28th and 143rd overall), a 2016 fifth-round selection and G Manny Ramirez.)
1	24	Arizona Cardinals	D. J. Humphries ^{†}	T	Florida	
1	25	Carolina Panthers	Shaq Thompson	LB	Washington	
1	26	Baltimore Ravens	Breshad Perriman	WR	UCF	
1	27	Dallas Cowboys	Byron Jones ^{†}	CB	UConn	
1	28	Detroit Lions	Laken Tomlinson ^{†}	G	Duke	from Denver (Note: No. 28: Denver → Detroit (D). See Round 1: Detroit → Denver.)
1	29	Indianapolis Colts	Phillip Dorsett	WR	Miami (FL)	
1	30	Green Bay Packers	Damarious Randall	S	Arizona State	
1	31	New Orleans Saints	Stephone Anthony	LB	Clemson	from Seattle (Note: No. 31: Seattle → New Orleans (PD). Seattle traded a first-round selection (31st overall) and C Max Unger to New Orleans in exchange for a fourth-round selection (112th) and TE Jimmy Graham.)
1	32	New England Patriots	Malcom Brown	DT	Texas	
2	33	New York Giants	Landon Collins ^{†}	S	Alabama	from Tennessee (Note: No. 33: Tennessee → NY Giants (D). Tennessee traded a second-round selection (33rd overall) to the NY Giants in exchange for second-, fourth- and seventh-round selections (40th, 108th and 245th overall).)
2	34	Tampa Bay Buccaneers	Donovan Smith	T	Penn State	
2	35	Oakland Raiders	Mario Edwards Jr.	DE	Florida State	
2	36	Jacksonville Jaguars	T. J. Yeldon	RB	Alabama	
2	37	New York Jets	Devin Smith	WR	Ohio State	
2	38	Washington Redskins	Preston Smith	DE	Mississippi State	
2	39	Chicago Bears	Eddie Goldman	DT	Florida State	
2	40	Tennessee Titans	Dorial Green-Beckham	WR	Missouri	from NY Giants (Note: No. 40: NY Giants → Tennessee (D). See Round 2: Tennessee → NY Giants.)
2	41	Carolina Panthers	Devin Funchess	WR	Michigan	from St. Louis (Note: No. 41: St. Louis → Carolina (D). St. Louis traded a second-round selection (41st overall) to Carolina in exchange for second-, third- and sixth-round selections (57th, 89th and 201st overall).)
2	42	Atlanta Falcons	Jalen Collins	CB	LSU	
2	43	Houston Texans	Benardrick McKinney ^{†}	LB	Mississippi State	from Cleveland (Note: No. 43: Cleveland → Houston (D). Cleveland traded second- and seventh-round selections (43rd and 229th overall) to Houston in exchange for second-, fourth- and sixth-round selections (51st, 116th and 195th overall).)
2	44	New Orleans Saints	Hau'oli Kikaha	LB	Washington	
2	45	Minnesota Vikings	Eric Kendricks ^{†}	LB	UCLA	2014 Butkus Award and Lott Trophy winner
2	46	San Francisco 49ers	Jaquiski Tartt	S	Samford	
2	47	Philadelphia Eagles	Eric Rowe	CB	Utah	from Miami (Note: No. 47: Miami → Philadelphia (D). Miami traded second- and sixth-round selections (47th and 191st overall) to Philadelphia in exchange for a second-round selection and two fifth-round selections (52nd, 145th and 156th overall).)
2	48	San Diego Chargers	Denzel Perryman ^{†}	LB	Miami (FL)	
2	49	Kansas City Chiefs	Mitch Morse ^{†}	G	Missouri	
2	50	Buffalo Bills	Ronald Darby	CB	Florida State	
2	51	Cleveland Browns	Nate Orchard	DE	Utah	from Houston (Note: No. 51: Houston → Cleveland (D). See Round 2: Cleveland → Houston.)
2	52	Miami Dolphins	Jordan Phillips	DT	Oklahoma	from Philadelphia (Note: No. 52: Philadelphia → Miami (D). See Round 2: Miami → Philadelphia.)
2	53	Cincinnati Bengals	Jake Fisher	T	Oregon	
2	54	Detroit Lions	Ameer Abdullah	RB	Nebraska	
2	55	Baltimore Ravens	Maxx Williams	TE	Minnesota	from Arizona (Note: No. 55: Arizona → Baltimore (D). Arizona traded a second-round selection (55th overall) to Baltimore in exchange for second- and fifth-round selections (58th and 158th overall).)
2	56	Pittsburgh Steelers	Senquez Golson	CB	Ole Miss	
2	57	St. Louis Rams	Rob Havenstein	T	Wisconsin	from Carolina (Note: No. 57: Carolina → St. Louis (D). See Round 2: Carolina → St. Louis.)
2	58	Arizona Cardinals	Markus Golden	DE	Missouri	from Baltimore (Note: No. 58: Baltimore → Arizona (D). See Round 2: Arizona → Baltimore.)
2	59	Denver Broncos	Ty Sambrailo	T	Colorado State	
2	60	Dallas Cowboys	Randy Gregory	LB	Nebraska	
2	61	Tampa Bay Buccaneers	Ali Marpet ^{†}	G	Hobart	from Indianapolis (Note: No. 61: Indianapolis → Tampa Bay (D). Indianapolis traded second- and fourth-round selections (61st and 128th overall) to Tampa Bay in exchange for third- and fourth-round selections (65th and 109th overall).)
2	62	Green Bay Packers	Quinten Rollins	CB	Miami (OH)	
2	63	Seattle Seahawks	Frank Clark ^{†}	DE	Michigan	
2	64	New England Patriots	Jordan Richards	S	Stanford	
3	65	Indianapolis Colts	D'Joun Smith	CB	Florida Atlantic	from Tampa Bay (Note: No. 65: Tampa Bay → Indianapolis (D). See Round 2: Indianapolis → Tampa Bay.)
3	66	Tennessee Titans	Jeremiah Poutasi	G	Utah	
3	67	Jacksonville Jaguars	A. J. Cann	G	South Carolina	
3	68	Oakland Raiders	Clive Walford	TE	Miami (FL)	
3	69	Seattle Seahawks	Tyler Lockett ^{†}	WR	Kansas State	from Washington (Note: No. 69: Washington → Seattle (D). Washington traded a third-round selection (69th overall) to Seattle in exchange for third-, fourth-, fifth- and sixth-round selections (95th, 112th, 167th and 181st overall).)
3	70	Houston Texans	Jaelen Strong	WR	Arizona State	from NY Jets (Note: No. 70: NY Jets → Houston (D). The NY Jets traded a third-round selection (70th overall) to Houston in exchange for third-, fifth- and seventh-round selections (82nd, 152nd and 229th overall), and WR DeVier Posey.)
3	71	Chicago Bears	Hroniss Grasu	C	Oregon	
3	72	St. Louis Rams	Jamon Brown	T	Louisville	
3	73	Atlanta Falcons	Tevin Coleman	RB	Indiana	
3	74	New York Giants	Owa Odighizuwa	DE	UCLA	
3	75	New Orleans Saints	Garrett Grayson	QB	Colorado State	
3	76	Kansas City Chiefs	Chris Conley	WR	Georgia	from Minnesota (Note: No. 76: Minnesota → Kansas City (D). Minnesota traded a third-round selection (76th overall) to Kansas City in exchange for third- and sixth-round selections (80th and 193rd overall).)
3	77	Cleveland Browns	Duke Johnson	RB	Miami (FL)	
3	78	New Orleans Saints	P. J. Williams	CB	Florida State	from Miami (Note: No. 78: Miami → New Orleans (PD). Miami traded a third-round selection (78th overall) and LB Dannell Ellerbe to New Orleans in exchange for WR Kenny Stills.)
3	79	San Francisco 49ers	Eli Harold	DE	Virginia	
3	80	Detroit Lions	Alex Carter	CB	Stanford	from Kansas City via Minnesota (Note: No. 80: Kansas City → Minnesota → Detroit. Multiple trades: Kansas City → Minnesota (D). See Round 3: Minnesota → Kansas City Minnesota → Detroit (D). Minnesota traded a third-round selection (80th overall) to Detroit in exchange for third- and fifth-round selections (88th and 143rd overall).)
3	81	Buffalo Bills	John Miller	G	Louisville	
3	82	New York Jets	Lorenzo Mauldin	LB	Louisville	from Houston (Note: No. 82: Houston → NY Jets (D). See Round 3: NY Jets → Houston.)
3	83	San Diego Chargers	Craig Mager	CB	Texas State	
3	84	Philadelphia Eagles	Jordan Hicks	LB	Texas	
3	85	Cincinnati Bengals	Tyler Kroft	TE	Rutgers	
3	86	Arizona Cardinals	David Johnson ^{†}	RB	Northern Iowa	
3	87	Pittsburgh Steelers	Sammie Coates	WR	Auburn	
3	88	Minnesota Vikings	Danielle Hunter ^{†}	DE	LSU	from Detroit (Note: No. 88: Detroit → Minnesota (D). See Round 3: Minnesota → Detroit.)
3	89	St. Louis Rams	Sean Mannion	QB	Oregon State	from Carolina (Note: No. 89: Carolina → St. Louis (D). See Round 2: Carolina → St. Louis.)
3	90	Baltimore Ravens	Carl Davis	DT	Iowa	
3	91	Dallas Cowboys	Chaz Green	T	Florida	
3	92	Denver Broncos	Jeff Heuerman	TE	Ohio State	
3	93	Indianapolis Colts	Henry Anderson	DE	Stanford	
3	94	Green Bay Packers	Ty Montgomery	WR	Stanford	
3	95	Washington Redskins	Matt Jones	RB	Florida	from Seattle (Note: No. 95: Seattle → Washington (D). See Round 3: Washington → Seattle.)
3	96	Cleveland Browns	Xavier Cooper	DT	Washington State	from New England (Note: No. 96: New England → Cleveland (D). New England traded third- and seventh-round selections (96th and 219th overall) to Cleveland in exchange for fourth-, fifth- and sixth-round selections (111th, 147th and 202nd overall).)
3*	97	New England Patriots	Geneo Grissom	DE	Oklahoma	
3*	98	Kansas City Chiefs	Steven Nelson	CB	Oregon State	
3*	99	Cincinnati Bengals	Paul Dawson	LB	TCU	
4	100	Tennessee Titans	Angelo Blackson	DT	Auburn	
4	101	New England Patriots	Trey Flowers	DE	Arkansas	from Tampa Bay (Note: No. 101: Tampa Bay → New England (PD). Tampa Bay traded a fourth-round selection (101st overall) and TE Tim Wright to New England in exchange for G Logan Mankins.)
4	102	Carolina Panthers	Daryl Williams	T	Oklahoma	from Oakland (Note: No. 102: Oakland → Carolina (D). Oakland traded a fourth-round selection (102nd overall) to Carolina in exchange for fourth-, fifth- and seventh-round selections (124th, 161st and 242nd overall).)
4	103	New York Jets	Bryce Petty	QB	Baylor	from Jacksonville (Note: No. 103: Jacksonville → NY Jets (D). Jacksonville traded a fourth-round selection (103rd overall) to the NY Jets in exchange for fourth- and seventh-round selections (104th and 229th overall).)
4	104	Jacksonville Jaguars	James Sample	S	Louisville	from NY Jets (Note: No. 104: NY Jets → Jacksonville (D). See Round 4: Jacksonville → NY Jets.)
4	105	Washington Redskins	Jamison Crowder	WR	Duke	
4	106	Chicago Bears	Jeremy Langford	RB	Michigan State	
4	107	Atlanta Falcons	Justin Hardy	WR	East Carolina	2014 Burlsworth Trophy winner
4	108	Tennessee Titans	Jalston Fowler	FB	Alabama	from NY Giants (Note: No. 108: NY Giants → Tennessee (D). See Round 2: Tennessee → NY Giants.)
4	109	Indianapolis Colts	Clayton Geathers	S	UCF	from St. Louis via Tampa Bay (Note: No. 109: St. Louis → Tampa Bay → Indianapolis. Multiple trades: St. Louis → Tampa Bay (PD). St. Louis traded fourth- and sixth-round selections (109th and 183rd overall) to Tampa Bay in exchange for S Mark Barron. Tampa Bay → Indianapolis (D). See Round 2: Indianapolis → Tampa Bay.)
4	110	Minnesota Vikings	T. J. Clemmings	T	Pittsburgh	
4	111	New England Patriots	Tre' Jackson	G	Florida State	from Cleveland (Note: No. 111: Cleveland → New England (D). See Round 3: New England → Cleveland.)
4	112	Washington Redskins	Arie Kouandjio	G	Alabama	from New Orleans via Seattle (Note: No. 112: New Orleans → Seattle → Washington. Multiple trades: New Orleans → Seattle (PD). See Round 1: Seattle → New Orleans. Seattle → Washington (D). See Round 3: Washington → Seattle.)
4	113	Detroit Lions	Gabe Wright	DT	Auburn	from San Francisco via Buffalo and Philadelphia (Note: No. 113: San Francisco → Buffalo → Philadelphia → Detroit. Multiple trades: San Francisco → Buffalo (PD). San Francisco traded a fourth-round selection (113th overall) to Buffalo in exchange for WR Stevie Johnson. Buffalo → Philadelphia (PD). Buffalo traded a conditional fourth-round selection (113th overall) and a 2014 seventh-round selection to Philadelphia in exchange for a 2014 seventh-round selection and RB Bryce Brown. The fourth-round selection was given as a result of Stevie Johnson hitting certain statistical targets for the 49ers in 2014; if he had missed the targets, Buffalo would have given up either a third- or fourth-round selection in 2016, depending on Brown hitting his own statistical targets. Philadelphia → Detroit (D). Philadelphia traded a fourth-round selection (113th overall) to Detroit in exchange for a 2016 third-round selection.)
4	114	Miami Dolphins	Jamil Douglas	G	Arizona State	
4	115	Cleveland Browns	Ibraheim Campbell	S	Northwestern	from Buffalo (Note: No. 115: Buffalo → Cleveland (PD). See Round 1: Buffalo → Cleveland.)
4	116	Arizona Cardinals	Rodney Gunter	DT	Delaware State	from Houston via Cleveland (Note: No. 116: Houston → Cleveland → Arizona. Multiple trades: Houston → Cleveland (D). See Round 2: Cleveland → Houston. Cleveland → Arizona (D). Cleveland traded a fourth-round selection (116th overall) to Arizona in exchange for fourth-, sixth- and seventh-round selection (123rd, 198th and 241st overall).)
4	117	San Francisco 49ers	Blake Bell	TE	Oklahoma	from San Diego (Note: No. 117: San Diego → San Francisco (D). See Round 1: San Francisco → San Diego.)
4	118	Kansas City Chiefs	Ramik Wilson	LB	Georgia	
4	119	St. Louis Rams	Andrew Donnal	T	Iowa	from Philadelphia (Note: No. 119: Philadelphia → St. Louis (PD). Philadelphia traded a fourth-round selection (119th overall), a 2016 second-round selection and QB Nick Foles to St. Louis in exchange for a fifth-round selection (145th overall) and QB Sam Bradford. The trade also included a conditional 2016 selection going to Philadelphia based on Bradford's playing time in 2015. If Bradford took less than 50 percent of the snaps, Philadelphia would receive St. Louis' fourth-round selection. If he did not play at all, Philadelphia would receive St. Louis' third-round selection.)
4	120	Cincinnati Bengals	Josh Shaw	CB	USC	
4	121	Pittsburgh Steelers	Doran Grant	CB	Ohio State	
4	122	Baltimore Ravens	Za'Darius Smith ^{†}	LB	Kentucky	from Detroit (Note: No. 122: Detroit → Baltimore (PD). Detroit traded fourth- and fifth-round selections (122nd and 158th overall) to Baltimore in exchange for a seventh-round selection (231st overall) and DT Haloti Ngata.)
4	123	Cleveland Browns	Vince Mayle	WR	Washington State	from Arizona (Note: No. 123: Arizona → Cleveland (D). See Round 4: Cleveland → Arizona.)
4	124	Tampa Bay Buccaneers	Kwon Alexander ^{†}	LB	LSU	from Carolina via Oakland (Note: No. 124: Carolina → Oakland → Tampa Bay. Multiple trades: Carolina → Oakland (D). See Round 4: Oakland → Carolina. Oakland → Tampa Bay (D). Oakland traded a fourth-round selection (124th overall) to Tampa Bay in exchange for fourth- and seventh-round selections (128th and 218th overall).)
4	125	Baltimore Ravens	Javorius Allen	RB	USC	
4	126	San Francisco 49ers	Mike Davis	RB	South Carolina	from Denver (Note: No. 126: Denver → San Francisco (PD). Denver traded a fourth-round selection (126th overall), and 2014 second- and fifth-round selections to San Francisco in exchange for 2014 second- and seventh-round selections.)
4	127	Dallas Cowboys	Damien Wilson	LB	Minnesota	
4	128	Oakland Raiders	Jon Feliciano	G	Miami (FL)	from Indianapolis via Tampa Bay (Note: No. 128: Indianapolis → Tampa Bay → Oakland. Multiple trades: Indianapolis → Tampa Bay (D). See Round 2: Indianapolis → Tampa Bay. Tampa Bay → Oakland (D). See Round 4: Oakland → Tampa Bay.)
4	129	Green Bay Packers	Jake Ryan	LB	Michigan	
4	130	Seattle Seahawks	Terry Poole	G	San Diego State	
4	131	New England Patriots	Shaq Mason	C	Georgia Tech	
4*	132	San Francisco 49ers	DeAndre Smelter	WR	Georgia Tech	
4*	133	Denver Broncos	Max Garcia	C	Florida	
4*	134	Seattle Seahawks	Mark Glowinski	G	West Virginia	
4*	135	Cincinnati Bengals	Marcus Hardison	DE	Arizona State	
4*	136	Baltimore Ravens	Tray Walker	CB	Texas Southern	
5	137	Atlanta Falcons	Grady Jarrett ^{†}	DT	Clemson	from Tampa Bay via Buffalo and Minnesota (Note: No. 137: Tampa Bay → Buffalo → Minnesota → Atlanta. Multiple trades: Tampa Bay → Buffalo (PD). Tampa Bay traded a fifth-round selection (137th overall) and a 2014 seventh-round selection to Buffalo in exchange for a 2014 fifth-round selection. Buffalo → Minnesota (PD). Buffalo traded a fifth-round selection (137th overall) and a 2016 seventh-round selection to Minnesota in exchange for a sixth-round selection (187th overall) and QB Matt Cassel. Minnesota → Atlanta (D). Minnesota traded a fifth-round selection (137th overall) to Atlanta in exchange for fifth- and sixth-round selections (146th and 185th overall).)
5	138	Tennessee Titans	David Cobb	RB	Minnesota	
5	139	Jacksonville Jaguars	Rashad Greene	WR	Florida State	
5	140	Oakland Raiders	Ben Heeney	LB	Kansas	
5	141	Washington Redskins	Martrell Spaight	LB	Arkansas	
5	142	Chicago Bears	Adrian Amos	S	Penn State	from NY Jets (Note: No. 142: NY Jets → Chicago (PD). The NY Jets traded a fifth-round selection (142nd overall) to Chicago in exchange for a seventh-round selection (224th overall) and WR Brandon Marshall.)
5	143	Minnesota Vikings	MyCole Pruitt	TE	Southern Illinois	from Chicago via Denver and Detroit (Note: No. 143: Chicago → Denver → Detroit → Minnesota. Multiple trades: No. 143: Chicago → Denver (PD). Chicago traded a fifth-round selection (143rd overall) and a 2014 fifth-round selection to Denver in exchange for 2014 fourth- and seventh-round selections. No. 143: Denver → Detroit (D). See Round 1: Detroit → Denver. No. 143: Detroit → Minnesota (D). See Round 3: Minnesota → Detroit.)
5	144	New York Giants	Mykkele Thompson	S	Texas	
5	145	Miami Dolphins	Bobby McCain	CB	Memphis	from St. Louis via Philadelphia (Note: No. 145: St. Louis → Philadelphia → Miami. Multiple trades: St. Louis → Philadelphia (PD). See Round 4: Philadelphia → St. Louis. Philadelphia → Miami (D). See Round 2: Miami → Philadelphia.)
5	146	Minnesota Vikings	Stefon Diggs ^{†}	WR	Maryland	from Atlanta (Note: No. 146: Atlanta → Minnesota (D). See Round 5: Minnesota → Atlanta.)
5	147	Green Bay Packers	Brett Hundley	QB	UCLA	from Cleveland via New England (Note: No. 147: Cleveland → New England → Green Bay. Multiple trades: Cleveland → New England (D). See Round 3: New England → Cleveland. New England → Green Bay (D). New England traded a fifth-round selection (147th overall) to Green Bay in exchange for fifth- and seventh-round selections (166th and 247th overall).)
5	148	New Orleans Saints	Davis Tull	LB	Chattanooga	
5	149	Miami Dolphins	Jay Ajayi ^{†}	RB	Boise State	from Minnesota (Note: No. 149: Minnesota → Miami (PD). Minnesota traded a fifth-round selection (149th overall) to Miami in exchange for a seventh-round selection (232nd overall) and WR Mike Wallace.)
5	150	Miami Dolphins	Cedric Thompson	S	Minnesota	
5	151	Indianapolis Colts	David Parry	DT	Stanford	from San Francisco (Note: No. 151: San Francisco → Indianapolis (D). San Francisco traded a fifth-round selection (151st overall) to Indianapolis in exchange for fifth- and seventh-round selections (165th and 244th overall).)
5	152	New York Jets	Jarvis Harrison	G	Texas A&M	from Houston (Note: No. 152: Houston → NY Jets (D). See Round 3: NY Jets → Houston.)
5	153	San Diego Chargers	Kyle Emanuel	LB	North Dakota State	2014 Buchanan Award winner
5	154	New Orleans Saints	Tyeler Davison	DT	Fresno State	from Kansas City (Note: No. 154: Kansas City → New Orleans (PD). Kansas City traded a fifth-round selection (154th overall) to New Orleans in exchange for G Ben Grubbs.)
5	155	Buffalo Bills	Karlos Williams	RB	Florida State	
5	156	Miami Dolphins	Tony Lippett	WR	Michigan State	from Philadelphia (Note: No. 156: Philadelphia → Miami (D). See Round 2: Miami → Philadelphia.)
5	157	Cincinnati Bengals	C. J. Uzomah	TE	Auburn	
5	158	Arizona Cardinals	Shaquille Riddick	DE	West Virginia	from Detroit via Baltimore (Note: No. 158: Detroit → Baltimore → Arizona. Multiple trades: Detroit → Baltimore (PD). See Round 4: Detroit → Baltimore. Baltimore → Arizona (D). See Round 2: Arizona → Baltimore.)
5	159	Arizona Cardinals	J. J. Nelson	WR	UAB	
5	160	Pittsburgh Steelers	Jesse James	TE	Penn State	
5	161	Oakland Raiders	Neiron Ball	LB	Florida	from Carolina (Note: No. 161: Carolina → Oakland (D). See Round 4: Oakland → Carolina.)
5	162	Tampa Bay Buccaneers	Kenny Bell	WR	Nebraska	from Baltimore (Note: No. 162: Baltimore → Tampa Bay (PD). Baltimore traded a fifth-round selection (162nd overall) to Tampa Bay in exchange for C Jeremy Zuttah.)
5	163	Dallas Cowboys	Ryan Russell	DE	Purdue	
5	164	Denver Broncos	Lorenzo Doss	CB	Tulane	
5	165	San Francisco 49ers	Bradley Pinion	P	Clemson	from Indianapolis (Note: No. 165: Indianapolis → San Francisco (D). See Round 5: San Francisco → Indianapolis.)
5	166	New England Patriots	Joe Cardona	LS	Navy	from Green Bay (Note: No. 166: Green Bay → New England (D). See Round 5: New England → Green Bay.)
5	167	New Orleans Saints	Damian Swann	CB	Georgia	from Seattle via Washington (Note: No. 167: Seattle → Washington → New Orleans. Multiple trades: Seattle → Washington (D). See Round 3: Washington → Seattle. Washington → New Orleans (D). Washington traded a fifth-round selection (167th overall) to New Orleans in exchange for a sixth-round selection (187th overall) and a 2016 sixth-round selection.)
5	168	Detroit Lions	Michael Burton	FB	Rutgers	from New England via Tampa Bay (Note: No. 168: New England → Tampa Bay → Detroit. Multiple trades: New England → Tampa Bay (PD). New England traded a fifth-round selection (168th overall) to Tampa Bay in exchange for a sixth-round selection (178th overall) and LB Jonathan Casillas. Tampa Bay → Detroit (PD). Tampa Bay traded a fifth-round selection (168th overall) to Detroit in exchange for a seventh-round selection (231st overall) and DE George Johnson.)
5*	169	Carolina Panthers	David Mayo	LB	Texas State	
5*	170	Seattle Seahawks	Tye Smith	CB	Towson	
5*	171	Baltimore Ravens	Nick Boyle	TE	Delaware	
5*	172	Kansas City Chiefs	D. J. Alexander ^{†}	LB	Oregon State	
5*	173	Kansas City Chiefs	James O'Shaughnessy	TE	Illinois State	
5*	174	Carolina Panthers	Cameron Artis-Payne	RB	Auburn	
5*	175	Houston Texans	Keith Mumphery	WR	Michigan State	
5*	176	Baltimore Ravens	Robert Myers	G	Tennessee State	
6	177	Tennessee Titans	Deiontrez Mount	LB	Louisville	
6	178	New England Patriots	Matthew Wells	LB	Mississippi State	from Tampa Bay (Note: No. 177: Tampa Bay → New England (PD). See Round 5: New England → Tampa Bay.)
6	179	Oakland Raiders	Max Valles	LB	Virginia	
6	180	Jacksonville Jaguars	Michael Bennett	DT	Ohio State	
6	181	Washington Redskins	Kyshoen Jarrett	S	Virginia Tech	from NY Jets via Seattle (Note: No. 181: NY Jets → Seattle → Washington. Multiple trades: NY Jets → Seattle (PD). The NY Jets traded a sixth-round selection (181st overall) to Seattle in exchange for WR Percy Harvin. Seattle → Washington (D). See Round 3: Washington → Seattle.)
6	182	Washington Redskins	Tevin Mitchel	CB	Arkansas	
6	183	Chicago Bears	Tayo Fabuluje	T	TCU	
6	184	Tampa Bay Buccaneers	Kaelin Clay	WR	Utah	from St. Louis (Note: No. 183: St. Louis → Tampa Bay (PD). See Round 4: St. Louis → Tampa Bay.)
6	185	Minnesota Vikings	Tyrus Thompson	T	Oklahoma	from Atlanta (Note: No. 185: Atlanta → Minnesota (D). See Round 5: Minnesota → Atlanta.)
6	186	New York Giants	Geremy Davis	WR	UConn	
6	187	Washington Redskins	Evan Spencer	WR	Ohio State	from New Orleans (Note: No. 187: New Orleans → Washington (D). See Round 5: Washington → New Orleans.)
6	188	Buffalo Bills	Tony Steward	LB	Clemson	from Minnesota (Note: No. 187: Minnesota → Buffalo (PD). See Round 5: Buffalo → Minnesota.)
6	189	Cleveland Browns	Charles Gaines	CB	Louisville	
6	190	San Francisco 49ers	Ian Silberman	G	Boston College	
6	191	Philadelphia Eagles	JaCorey Shepherd	CB	Kansas	from Miami (Note: No. 191: Miami → Philadelphia (D). See Round 2: Miami → Philadelphia.)
6	192	San Diego Chargers	Darius Philon	DT	Arkansas	
6	193	Minnesota Vikings	B. J. Dubose	DE	Louisville	from Kansas City (Note: No. 193: Kansas City → Minnesota (D). See Round 3: Minnesota → Kansas City)
6	194	Buffalo Bills	Nick O'Leary	TE	Florida State	
6	195	Cleveland Browns	Malcolm Johnson	TE	Mississippi State	from Houston (Note: No. 195: Houston → Cleveland (D). See Round 2: Cleveland → Houston.)
6	196	Philadelphia Eagles	Randall Evans	CB	Kansas State	
6	197	Cincinnati Bengals	Derron Smith	S	Fresno State	
6	198	Cleveland Browns	Randall Telfer	TE	USC	from Arizona (Note: No. 198: Arizona → Cleveland (D). See Round 4: Cleveland → Arizona.)
6	199	Pittsburgh Steelers	Leterrius Walton	DT	Central Michigan	
6	200	Detroit Lions	Quandre Diggs ^{†}	S	Texas	
6	201	St. Louis Rams	Bud Sasser	WR	Missouri	from Carolina (Note: No. 201: Carolina → St. Louis (D). See Round 2: Carolina → St. Louis.)
6	202	New England Patriots	A. J. Derby	TE	Arkansas	from Baltimore via Cleveland (Note: No. 202: Baltimore → Cleveland → New England. Multiple trades: Baltimore → Cleveland (PD). Baltimore traded a sixth-round selection (202nd overall) to Cleveland in exchange for a 2014 seventh-round selection. Cleveland → New England (D). See Round 3: New England → Cleveland.)
6	203	Denver Broncos	Darius Kilgo	DT	Maryland	
6	204	Baltimore Ravens	Darren Waller ^{†}	TE	Georgia Tech	from Dallas (Note: No. 203: Dallas → Baltimore (PD). Dallas traded a sixth-round selection (204th overall) to Baltimore in exchange for a seventh-round selection (243rd overall) and LB Rolando McClain.)
6	205	Indianapolis Colts	Josh Robinson	RB	Mississippi State	
6	206	Green Bay Packers	Aaron Ripkowski	FB	Oklahoma	
6	207	Indianapolis Colts	Amarlo Herrera	LB	Georgia	from Seattle (Note: No. 206: Seattle → Indianapolis (PD). Seattle traded a sixth-round selection (207th overall) to Indianapolis in exchange for CB Marcus Burley.)
6	208	Tennessee Titans	Andy Gallik	C	Boston College	from New England (Note: No. 207: New England → Tennessee (PD). New England traded a sixth-round selection (208th overall) to Tennessee in exchange for a seventh-round selection (219th overall) and LB Akeem Ayers.)
6*	209	Seattle Seahawks	Obum Gwacham	DE	Oregon State	
6*	210	Green Bay Packers	Christian Ringo	DE	Louisiana–Lafayette	
6*	211	Houston Texans	Reshard Cliett	LB	South Florida	
6*	212	Pittsburgh Steelers	Anthony Chickillo	DE	Miami (FL)	
6*	213	Green Bay Packers	Kennard Backman	TE	UAB	
6*	214	Seattle Seahawks	Kristjan Sokoli	DT	Buffalo	
6*	215	St. Louis Rams	Cody Wichmann	G	Fresno State	
6*	216	Houston Texans	Christian Covington	DT	Rice	
6*	217	Kansas City Chiefs	Rakeem Nunez-Roches	DT	Southern Miss	
7	218	Oakland Raiders	Anthony Morris	T	Tennessee State	from Tampa Bay (Note: No. 128: Tampa Bay → Oakland (D). See Round 4: Oakland → Tampa Bay.)
7	219	Cleveland Browns	Hayes Pullard	LB	USC	from Tennessee via New England (Note: No. 219: Tennessee → New England → Cleveland. Multiple trades: Tennessee → New England (PD). See Round 6: New England → Tennessee. New England → Cleveland (D). See Round 3: New England → Cleveland.)
7	220	Jacksonville Jaguars	Neal Sterling	WR	Monmouth	
7	221	Oakland Raiders	Andre Debose	WR	Florida	
7	222	Washington Redskins	Austin Reiter	C	South Florida	
7	223	New York Jets	Deon Simon	DT	Northwestern State	
7	224	St. Louis Rams	Bryce Hager	LB	Baylor	from Chicago via NY Jets (Note: No. 224: Chicago → NY Jets → St. Louis. Multiple trades: Chicago → NY Jets (PD). See Round 5: NY Jets → Chicago. NY Jets → St. Louis (D). The NY Jets traded a seventh-round selection (224th overall) to St. Louis in exchange for RB Zac Stacy.)
7	225	Atlanta Falcons	Jake Rodgers	T	Eastern Washington	
7	226	New York Giants	Bobby Hart	T	Florida State	
7	227	St. Louis Rams	Martin Ifedi	DE	Memphis	
7	228	Minnesota Vikings	Austin Shepherd	T	Alabama	
7	229	Jacksonville Jaguars	Ben Koyack	TE	Notre Dame	from Cleveland via Houston and NY Jets (Note: No. 229: Cleveland → Houston → NY Jets. Multiple trades: Cleveland → Houston (D). See Round 2: Cleveland → Houston. Houston → NY Jets (D). See Round 3: NY Jets → Houston. NY Jets → Jacksonville (D). See Round 4: Jacksonville → NY Jets.)
7	230	New Orleans Saints	Marcus Murphy	RB	Missouri	
7	231	Tampa Bay Buccaneers	Joey Iosefa	FB	Hawaii	from Miami via Baltimore and Detroit (Note: No. 231: Miami → Baltimore → Detroit → Tampa Bay. Multiple trades: Miami → Baltimore (PD). Miami traded a seventh-round selection (231st overall) to Baltimore in exchange for OT Bryant McKinnie. Baltimore → Detroit (PD). See Round 4: Detroit → Baltimore. Detroit → Tampa Bay (PD). See Round 5: Tampa Bay → Detroit.)
7	232	Minnesota Vikings	Edmond Robinson	LB	Newberry	from San Francisco via Miami (Note: No. 232: San Francisco → Miami → Minnesota. Multiple trades: San Francisco → Miami (PD). San Francisco traded a seventh-round selection (232nd overall) to Miami in exchange for OT Jonathan Martin. Miami → Minnesota (PD). See Round 5: Minnesota → Miami.)
7	233	Kansas City Chiefs	Da'Ron Brown	WR	Northern Illinois	
7	234	Buffalo Bills	Dezmin Lewis	WR	Central Arkansas	
7	235	Houston Texans	Kenny Hilliard	RB	LSU	
7	236	Dallas Cowboys	Mark Nzeocha	LB	Wyoming	from San Diego (Note: No. 236: San Diego → Dallas (PD). San Diego traded a seventh-round selection (236th overall) to Dallas in exchange for DT Sean Lissemore.)
7	237	Philadelphia Eagles	Brian Mihalik	DE	Boston College	
7	238	Cincinnati Bengals	Mario Alford	WR	West Virginia	
7	239	Pittsburgh Steelers	Gerod Holliman	S	Louisville	2014 Jim Thorpe Award winner
7	240	Detroit Lions	Corey Robinson	T	South Carolina	
7	241	Cleveland Browns	Ifo Ekpre-Olomu	CB	Oregon	from Arizona (Note: No. 241: Arizona → Cleveland (D). See Round 4: Cleveland → Arizona.)
7	242	Oakland Raiders	Dexter McDonald	CB	Kansas	from Carolina (Note: No. 242: Carolina → Oakland (D). See Round 4: Oakland → Carolina.)
7	243	Dallas Cowboys	Laurence Gibson	T	Virginia Tech	from Baltimore (Note: No. 243: Baltimore → Dallas (PD). See Round 6: Dallas → Baltimore.)
7	244	San Francisco 49ers	Trent Brown ^{†}	T	Florida	from Dallas via Indianapolis (Note: No. 244: Dallas → Indianapolis → San Francisco. Multiple trades: Dallas → Indianapolis (PD). Dallas traded a seventh-round selection (244th overall) to Indianapolis in exchange for LB Caesar Rayford. Indianapolis → San Francisco (D). See Round 5: San Francisco → Indianapolis.)
7	245	Tennessee Titans	Tre McBride	WR	William & Mary	from Denver via NY Giants (Note: No. 245: Denver → NY Giants → Tennessee. Multiple trades: Denver → NY Giants (PD). Denver traded a seventh-round selection (245th overall) to the NY Giants in exchange for K Brandon McManus. NY Giants → Tennessee (D). See Round 2: Tennessee → NY Giants.)
7	246	Dallas Cowboys	Geoff Swaim	TE	Texas	from Indianapolis via San Francisco (Note: No. 246: Indianapolis → San Francisco → Dallas. Multiple trades: Indianapolis → San Francisco (PD). Indianapolis traded a seventh-round selection (246th overall) to San Francisco in exchange for DE Cam Johnson. San Francisco → Dallas (D). San Francisco traded a seventh-round selection (246th overall) to Dallas in exchange for a 2016 sixth-round selection.)
7	247	New England Patriots	Darryl Roberts	CB	Marshall	from Green Bay (Note: No. 247: Green Bay → New England (D). See Round 5: New England → Green Bay.)
7	248	Seattle Seahawks	Ryan Murphy	S	Oregon State	
7	249	Atlanta Falcons	Akeem King	CB	San Jose State	from New England via St. Louis (Note: No. 249: New England → St. Louis → Atlanta. Multiple trades: New England → St. Louis (PD). New England traded a seventh-round selection (249th overall) to St. Louis in exchange for WR Greg Salas. St. Louis → Atlanta (PD). St. Louis traded a seventh-round selection (249th overall) and a 2013 first-round selection to Atlanta in exchange for 2013 first-, third- and sixth-round selections.)
7*	250	Denver Broncos	Trevor Siemian	QB	Northwestern	
7*	251	Denver Broncos	Taurean Nixon	CB	Tulane	
7*	252	Denver Broncos	Josh Furman	S	Oklahoma State	
7*	253	New England Patriots	Xzavier Dickson	LB	Alabama	
7*	254	San Francisco 49ers	Rory Anderson	TE	South Carolina	
7*	255	Indianapolis Colts	Denzelle Good	T	Mars Hill	
7*	256	Arizona Cardinals	Gerald Christian	TE	Louisville	Mr. Irrelevant

== Supplemental draft ==
A supplemental draft was held on July 9, 2015. For each player selected in the supplemental draft, the team forfeits its pick in that round in the draft of the following season. Seven players were available, but only one was selected.

Rnd.	Pick	Team	Player	Pos.	College	Notes
5	—	St. Louis Rams	Isaiah Battle	T	Clemson	

== Notable undrafted players ==
Original NFL team	Player	Pos.	College	Notes
Arizona Cardinals	Cariel Brooks	CB	Adams State	
Arizona Cardinals	Edwin Jackson	LB	Georgia Southern	
Arizona Cardinals	Harold Jones-Quartey	S	Findlay	
Arizona Cardinals	Xavier Williams	NT	Northern Iowa	
Atlanta Falcons	Shane Wynn	WR	Indiana	
Baltimore Ravens	Daniel Brown	TE	James Madison	
Baltimore Ravens	DeAndre Carter	WR	Sacramento State	
Baltimore Ravens	Nick Easton	G	Harvard	
Buffalo Bills	Chris Manhertz	TE	Canisius	Played college basketball
Carolina Panthers	Damiere Byrd	WR	South Carolina	
Carolina Panthers	Dean Marlowe	S	James Madison	
Carolina Panthers	Matt Wile	P	Michigan	
Chicago Bears	Bryce Callahan	CB	Rice	
Chicago Bears	Jacoby Glenn	CB	UCF	
Chicago Bears	Khari Lee	TE	Bowie State	
Chicago Bears	Rick Lovato ^{†}	LS	Old Dominion	
Chicago Bears	Cameron Meredith	WR	Illinois State	
Chicago Bears	John Timu	LB	Washington	
Cincinnati Bengals	Troy Hill	CB	Oregon	
Cincinnati Bengals	Jake Kumerow	WR	Wisconsin–Whitewater	
Cincinnati Bengals	Matt Lengel	TE	Eastern Kentucky	
Cincinnati Bengals	DeShawn Williams	DT	Clemson	
Cleveland Browns	Darius Jennings	WR	Virginia	
Dallas Cowboys	La'el Collins	T	LSU	
Dallas Cowboys	Efe Obada	DE		European player signed from the BAFANL
Denver Broncos	A. J. Johnson	LB	Tennessee	
Detroit Lions	Zach Zenner	RB	South Dakota State	
Green Bay Packers	LaDarius Gunter	CB	Miami (FL)	
Green Bay Packers	James Vaughters	LB	Stanford	
Houston Texans	Kendall Lamm	T	Appalachian State	
Houston Texans	Greg Mancz	C	Toledo	
Houston Texans	Corey Moore	S	Georgia	
Indianapolis Colts	Quan Bray	WR	Auburn	
Jacksonville Jaguars	Cap Capi	DE	Akron	
Jacksonville Jaguars	Sam Ficken	K	Penn State	
Jacksonville Jaguars	Chris Reed	G	Minnesota State	
Kansas City Chiefs	Andrew East	LS	Vanderbilt	
Kansas City Chiefs	David Irving	DE	Iowa State	
Miami Dolphins	Matt Darr	P	Tennessee	
Miami Dolphins	Sam Eguavoen	LB	Texas Tech	
Miami Dolphins	Andrew Franks	K	RPI	
Miami Dolphins	Neville Hewitt	LB	Marshall	
Miami Dolphins	Mike Hull	LB	Penn State	
Minnesota Vikings	Justin Coleman	CB	Tennessee	
Minnesota Vikings	Anthony Harris	S	Virginia	
Minnesota Vikings	Taylor Heinicke	QB	Old Dominion	
New England Patriots	David Andrews	C	Georgia	
New England Patriots	Brandon King	LB	Auburn	
New York Giants	Matt LaCosse	TE	Illinois	
New York Giants	Will Tye	TE	Stony Brook	
New York Jets	Tevaughn Campbell	CB	Regina	
Oakland Raiders	Robertson Daniel	DB	BYU	
Philadelphia Eagles	Raheem Mostert ^{†}	RB	Purdue	
Pittsburgh Steelers	B. J. Finney	C	Kansas State	
Pittsburgh Steelers	Eli Rogers	WR	Louisville	
San Diego Chargers	Tyreek Burwell	T	Cincinnati	
San Diego Chargers	Josh Lambo	K	Texas A&M	
San Diego Chargers	Tyrell Williams	WR	Western Oregon	
San Francisco 49ers	Jermaine Whitehead	S	Auburn	
Seattle Seahawks	Jesse Davis	T	Idaho	
Seattle Seahawks	Thomas Rawls	RB	Central Michigan	
Seattle Seahawks	Alex Singleton	LB	Montana State	
St. Louis Rams	Malcolm Brown	RB	Texas	
Tampa Bay Buccaneers	Deshazor Everett	S	Texas A&M	
Tampa Bay Buccaneers	Adam Humphries	WR	Clemson	
Tennessee Titans	Quinton Spain	G	West Virginia	
Washington Redskins	Quinton Dunbar	CB	Florida	
Washington Redskins	Ty Long	P	UAB	

== Trades ==
In the explanations below, (PD) indicates trades completed prior to the start of the draft (i.e. Pre-Draft), while (D) denotes trades that took place during the 2015 draft.

Round 1

Round 2

Round 3

Round 4

Round 5

Round 6

Round 7

== Summary ==
=== Selections by college athletic conference ===
Conference	Round 1	Round 2	Round 3	Round 4	Round 5	Round 6	Round 7	Total
NCAA Division I FBS football conferences
The American	2	0	0	2	2	2	3	11
ACC	9	4	7	7	4	11	5	47
Big 12	2	1	4	4	3	6	5	25
Big Ten	3	8	4	6	10	3	1	35
C-USA	0	0	1	0	1	3	1	6
MAC	0	1	0	0	0	2	1	4
MWC	0	1	1	1	2	2	3	10
Pac-12	9	6	10	5	3	3	3	39
SEC	7	9	6	10	6	8	8	54
Sun Belt	0	0	1	0	1	1	0	3
Ind.	0	0	0	0	1	0	1	2
NCAA Division I FCS football conferences
Big Sky	0	0	0	0	0	0	1	1
Big South	0	0	0	0	0	0	1	1
CAA	0	0	0	0	2	0	1	3
MEAC	0	0	0	1	0	0	0	1
MVFC	0	0	1	0	3	0	0	4
OVC	0	0	0	0	1	0	1	2
SoCon	0	1	0	0	1	0	0	2
Southland	0	0	0	0	0	0	2	2
SWAC	0	0	0	1	0	0	0	1
Non-Division I football conferences
Liberty (DIII)	0	1	0	0	0	0	0	1
SAC (DII)	0	0	0	0	0	0	2	2

=== Schools with multiple draft selections ===
Selections	Schools
11	Florida State
10	Louisville
8	Florida
7	Alabama, Miami (FL)
6	Missouri, Oklahoma, Stanford, USC
5	Arkansas, Auburn, Clemson, Georgia, Mississippi State, Ohio State, Oregon, Oregon State, Texas
4	Arizona State, LSU, Michigan State, Minnesota, South Carolina, Utah, Washington, West Virginia
3	Boston College, Fresno State, Georgia Tech, Iowa, Kansas, Michigan, Nebraska, Penn State, UCLA
2	Baylor, Colorado State, Connecticut, Duke, Kansas State, Kentucky, Maryland, Memphis, Northwestern, Rutgers, TCU, Tennessee State, Texas A&M, Texas State, Tulane, UAB, UCF, USF, Virginia, Virginia Tech, Washington State, Wisconsin

=== Selections by position ===
Position	Round 1	Round 2	Round 3	Round 4	Round 5	Round 6	Round 7	Total
Center	1	0	1	2	0	1	1	6
Cornerback	4	5	5	3	4	5	5	31
Defensive end	4	5	5	3	2	4	2	25
Defensive tackle	2	2	2	3	3	7	1	20
Fullback	0	0	0	1	1	1	1	4
Guard	1	2	3	6	2	2	0	16
Linebacker	4	5	3	4	7	6	5	34
Long snapper	0	0	0	0	1	0	0	1
Offensive tackle	5	4	2	3	0	2	8	24
Punter	0	0	0	0	1	0	0	1
Quarterback	2	0	2	1	1	0	1	7
Running back	2	2	4	3	4	1	2	18
Safety	1	3	0	3	3	2	3	15
Tight end	0	1	3	1	5	5	4	19
Wide receiver	6	3	5	4	6	5	6	35

Position	Round 1	Round 2	Round 3	Round 4	Round 5	Round 6	Round 7	Total
Offense	17	12	20	21	19	17	23	129
Defense	15	20	15	16	19	24	16	125
Special teams	0	0	0	0	2	0	0	2
