= Cariel Brooks =

American football player (born 1991)

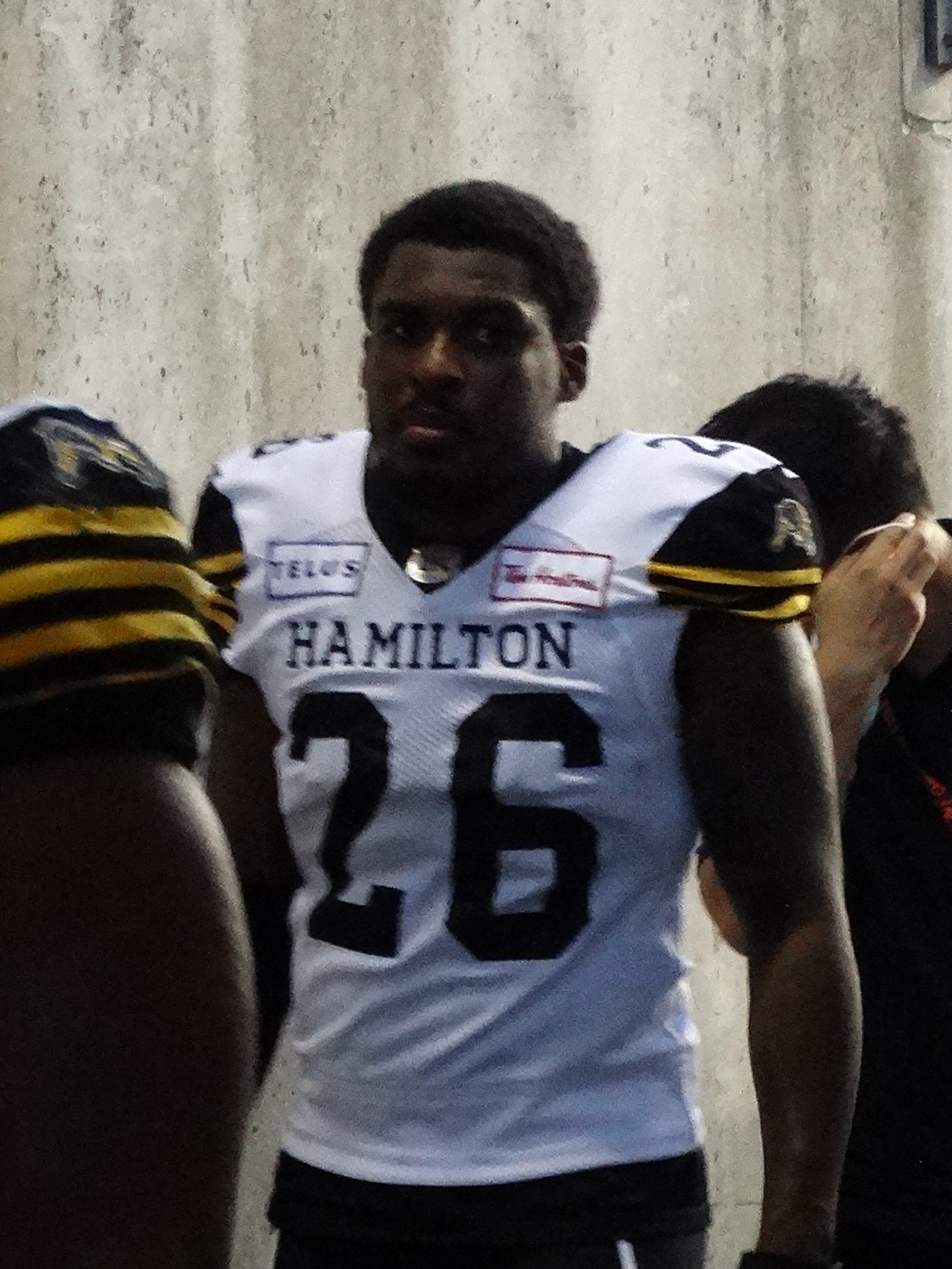
- Brooks with the Hamilton Tiger-Cats in 2022

No. 25
- Position: Cornerback

Personal information
- Born: April 24, 1991 (age 35); Miami Gardens, Florida, U.S.
- Listed height: 5 ft 10 in (1.78 m)
- Listed weight: 200 lb (91 kg)

Career information
- High school: Miami Carol City (Miami Gardens}
- College: Adams State
- NFL draft: 2015: undrafted

Career history
- Arizona Cardinals (2015–2016); Toronto Argonauts (2017)*; Hamilton Tiger-Cats (2017–2022); Ottawa Redblacks (2023)
- * Offseason or practice squad member only

Awards and highlights
- CFL All-Star (2021); CFL East All-Star (2018, 2021)

Career NFL statistics
- Games played: 3
- Total tackles: 1
- Stats at Pro Football Reference

Career CFL statistics
- Total tackles: 207
- Sacks: 2
- Forced fumbles: 4
- Interceptions: 12
- Stats at CFL.ca

Cariel Brooks (born April 24, 1991) is an American former professional football player who was a cornerback in the National Football League (NFL) and Canadian Football League (CFL). He played college football for the Adams State Grizzlies. He was signed as an undrafted free agent by the NFL's Arizona Cardinals.

== Early life ==
Brooks attended Miami Carol City High School. While there he was a second-team All-conference selection in football. He was also an All-conference selection in track & field.

== College career ==
Brooks then attended Pasadena City College in 2011 before transferring to Adams State University. As a sophomore in 2012, he appeared in eight games. He recorded 21 tackles (15 solo), one tackle-for-loss, two interceptions and seven passes defensed. In 2013, as a junior, he appeared in 11 games. He recorded 38 tackles and three interceptions. As a senior in 2014, he appeared in 10 games and recorded three interceptions.

== Professional career ==
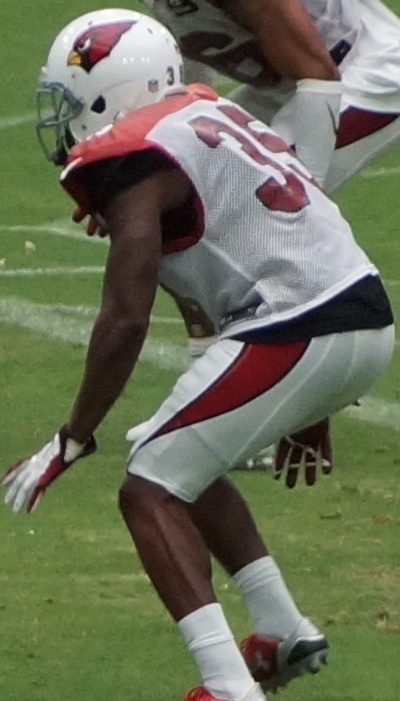
Brooks with the Arizona Cardinals in 2016

Pre-draft measurables
Height	Weight	Arm length	Hand span	40-yard dash	10-yard split	20-yard split	20-yard shuttle	Three-cone drill	Vertical jump	Broad jump	Bench press
5 ft 8 3/4 in (1.75 m)	192 lb (87 kg)	29 1/2 in (0.75 m)	9 3/8 in (0.24 m)	4.57 s	1.58 s	2.66 s	4.32 s	7.00 s	32.5 in (0.83 m)	9 ft 3 in (2.82 m)	14 reps
All values from Colorado State Pro Day.

=== Arizona Cardinals ===
After going unselected in the 2015 NFL draft, Brooks was signed by the Arizona Cardinals. He was released on September 5 and two days later he was signed to the Cardinals' practice squad. On October 14, 2015, he was promoted to the Cardinals' active roster. He appeared in three games for the Cardinals, recording one special teams tackle. On November 11, he was placed on injured reserve with an ankle injury. He was released from injured reserve on December 29. He signed a futures contract on January 27, 2016. On September 3, 2016, he was released by the Cardinals.

=== Toronto Argonauts ===
Brooks signed with the Toronto Argonauts of the Canadian Football League (CFL) on March 14, 2017. He was released by the Argonauts on June 18, 2017.

=== Hamilton Tiger-Cats ===
On August 8, 2017, Brooks was signed to the practice roster of the Hamilton Tiger-Cats of the CFL. He was promoted to the active roster on August 13, and was demoted to the practice roster on August 17, 2017. He re-signed with the Tiger-Cats on January 25, 2021. Brooks was released on February 10, 2023.

=== Ottawa Redblacks ===
Brooks signed with the Ottawa Redblacks on February 14, 2023. He retired in February 2024.
