= Rory Anderson =

American football player (born 1992)

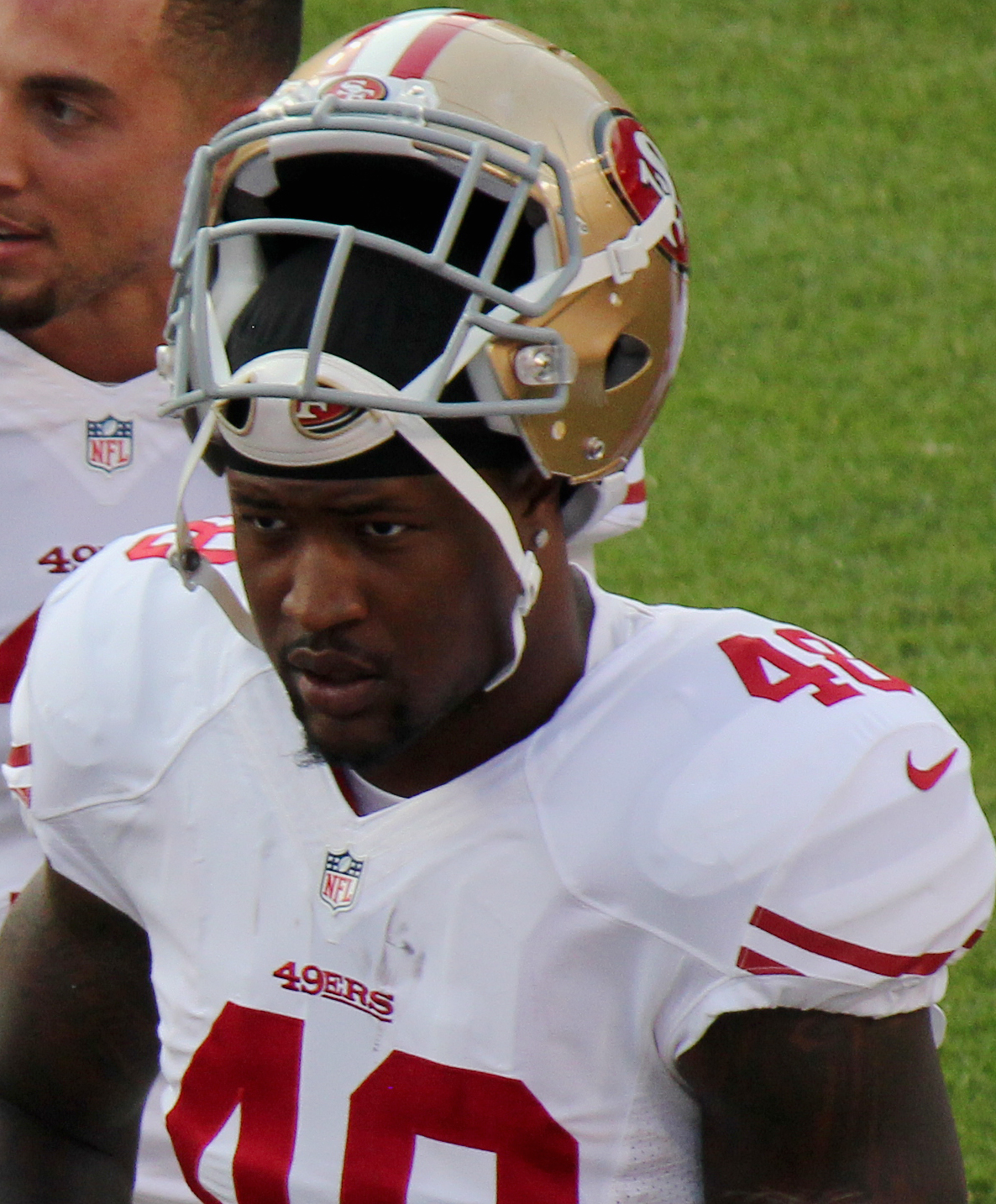
- Anderson with the San Francisco 49ers in 2015

No. 48
- Position: Tight end

Personal information
- Born: October 2, 1992 (age 34); Marietta, Georgia, U.S.
- Listed height: 6 ft 5 in (1.96 m)
- Listed weight: 246 lb (112 kg)

Career information
- High school: McEachern (Powder Springs, Georgia)
- College: South Carolina
- NFL draft: 2015: 7th round, 254th overall pick

Career history
- San Francisco 49ers (2015); Chicago Bears (2016)*; Buffalo Bills (2017)*; Birmingham Iron (2019)
- * Offseason or practice squad member only
- Stats at Pro Football Reference

Rory C. "Busta" Anderson II (born October 2, 1992) is an American former professional football player who was a tight end in the National Football League (NFL). He was selected by the San Francisco 49ers in the seventh round of the 2015 NFL draft. He played college football for the South Carolina Gamecocks. He was also a member of the Chicago Bears, Buffalo Bills, and Birmingham Iron.

== Early life ==
Played both football and basketball in high school at Powder Springs (GA) McEachern. As a junior, he helped the basketball team to the state AAAAA quarterfinals. As a senior, he was captain of the basketball team, and caught 38 passes with 6 touchdowns in football.

Football recruiting websites labeled Rory as a high-end valuable 3 star recruit. Rory held over a dozen offers from colleges and ultimately chose South Carolina over schools such as Tennessee, Virginia, West Virginia, Illinois, Louisville, Mississippi State, USF, NC State, Cincinnati, and many others.

== College career ==
Anderson played college football at the University of South Carolina from 2011 through the 2014 season. Although sidelined by injuries during his college career, he finished with 954 yards on 61 catches (15.6 average) and 9 touchdown catches.

== Professional career ==
Pre-draft measurables
Height	Weight	Arm length	Hand span
6 ft 4 5/8 in (1.95 m)	244 lb (111 kg)	32 1/4 in (0.82 m)	8 3/4 in (0.22 m)
All values from NFL Combine

=== San Francisco 49ers ===
Anderson was selected by the San Francisco 49ers of the National Football League (NFL) in the seventh round (254th overall) of the 2015 NFL draft. The 49ers also drafted his college teammate Mike Davis in the 4th round. Along with Davis, the 49ers also signed college teammate quarterback Dylan Thompson as an undrafted rookie and wide receiver Bruce Ellington was selected in the 4th round in the 2014 NFL draft. All 4 of these players played together for the 2012 Gamecocks. On May 11, 2015, Anderson signed his rookie contract. Anderson caught his first touchdown in a preseason game against the San Diego Chargers on September 3, 2015. On August 28, 2016, the 49ers released Anderson along with offensive lineman Erik Pears.

=== Chicago Bears ===
On September 27, 2016, the Chicago Bears signed Anderson to the practice squad. He was placed on the practice squad/injured list on October 10, 2016.

=== Buffalo Bills ===
On August 20, 2017, Anderson was signed by the Buffalo Bills. He was waived on September 2, 2017.

=== Birmingham Iron ===
In 2019, Anderson joined the Birmingham Iron of the Alliance of American Football. He was placed on injured reserve on March 4, 2019, and waived from injured reserve on April 1, 2019.

== Personal life ==
Anderson has stated that the reason the nickname "Busta" became so prevalent in his life is because his mom, Rhonda Anderson called him "Buster" at a very young age.
