= A. J. Cann =

American football player (born 1991)

Profile
- Position: Guard

Personal information
- Born: October 23, 1991 (age 35); Bamberg, South Carolina, U.S.
- Listed height: 6 ft 3 in (1.91 m)
- Listed weight: 320 lb (145 kg)

Career information
- High school: Bamberg-Ehrhardt
- College: South Carolina (2010–2014)
- NFL draft: 2015: 3rd round, 67th overall pick

Career history
- Jacksonville Jaguars (2015–2021); Houston Texans (2022)

Awards and highlights
- Second-team All-American (2014); First-team All-SEC (2014)

Career NFL statistics
- Games played: 111
- Games started: 110
- Stats at Pro Football Reference

Aaron Cann (born October 23, 1991) is an American professional football guard. He played college football for the South Carolina Gamecocks, and was selected in the third round of the 2015 NFL draft by the Jacksonville Jaguars.

== Early life ==
Cann attended Bamberg-Ehrhardt High School in Bamberg, South Carolina, where he played football and competed in track. He committed to play college football at the University of South Carolina in June 2009.

Cann's mother died of throat cancer on October 7, 2007.

== College career ==
Cann was redshirted as a freshman in 2010. In 2011, he became a starter at left guard. In 2013, he was named a permanent team captain. Cann had started 38 of 39 games entering his senior season. As a senior in 2014, he started all 13 games and was named an All-American.

Cann was a four-year starter, starting in 51 games, the second-most in school history to T. J. Johnson who started 53 games.

== Professional career ==
Pre-draft measurables
Height	Weight	Arm length	Hand span	40-yard dash	Vertical jump	Broad jump	Bench press
6 ft 2 3/4 in (1.90 m)	313 lb (142 kg)	32 5/8 in (0.83 m)	10 1/4 in (0.26 m)	5.46 s	32.5 in (0.83 m)	9 ft 1 in (2.77 m)	30 reps
Measurables and bench press values from NFL Combine; all other values from Pro Day

=== Jacksonville Jaguars ===
Cann was drafted by the Jacksonville Jaguars in the third round, 67th overall, in the 2015 NFL draft.

During his rookie season in 2015, Cann started 13 games at right guard while playing a total of 14 games.

In 2016, Cann saw a full-time role on the offensive line, starting all 16 games at the right guard position for the Jaguars.

Cann maintained his starting job at right guard in 2017 and 2018, starting 15 games both seasons, missing one each season, both due to a triceps injury.

On March 13, 2019, Cann signed a three-year, $15 million contract extension with the Jaguars.

On October 4, 2021, Cann was placed on injured reserve.

=== Houston Texans ===
On March 23, 2022, Cann signed a two-year, $8.5 million contract with the Houston Texans. He was named the Texans starting right guard, and started 16 games.

Cann was released on March 16, 2023.
