= Corey Robinson (offensive tackle) =

American football player (born 1992)

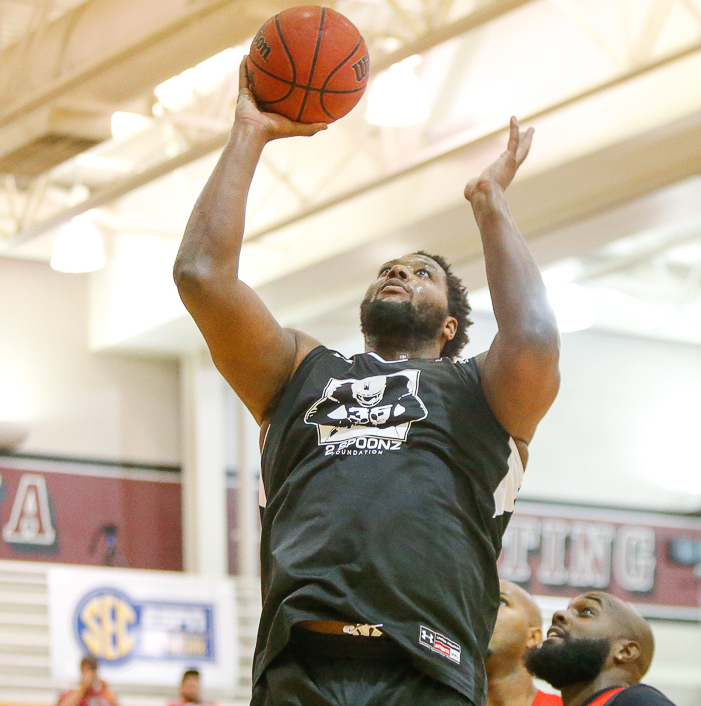
- Robinson playing basketball in 2019

No. 70, 77, 79
- Position: Offensive tackle

Personal information
- Born: May 21, 1992 (age 34); Havelock, North Carolina, U.S.
- Listed height: 6 ft 7 in (2.01 m)
- Listed weight: 315 lb (143 kg)

Career information
- High school: Havelock
- College: South Carolina
- NFL draft: 2015: 7th round, 240th overall pick

Career history
- Detroit Lions (2015–2017); Carolina Panthers (2018); Jacksonville Jaguars (2018); Washington Redskins (2019)*
- * Offseason or practice squad member only

Career NFL statistics
- Games played: 28
- Games started: 9
- Stats at Pro Football Reference

Corey Robinson (born May 21, 1992) is an American former professional football player who was an offensive tackle in the National Football League (NFL). He played college football for the South Carolina Gamecocks, and was selected by the Detroit Lions in the seventh round of the 2015 NFL draft. He also played for the Carolina Panthers and Jacksonville Jaguars.

== College career ==
Robinson began his college career at South Carolina as a transition player from offensive line to defensive line, before permanently switching back to offensive line as a redshirt sophomore in 2012. He logged 35 career starts in 38 games during his time as a Gamecock.

== Professional career ==
Pre-draft measurables
Height	Weight	Arm length	Hand span	Wingspan	40-yard dash	10-yard split	20-yard split	20-yard shuttle	Three-cone drill	Vertical jump	Broad jump	Bench press
6 ft 6 5/8 in (2.00 m)	324 lb (147 kg)	35 5/8 in (0.90 m)	10 3/4 in (0.27 m)	7 ft 1 3/8 in (2.17 m)	5.29 s	1.87 s	3.06 s	4.82 s	8.36 s	31.0 in (0.79 m)	9 ft 0 in (2.74 m)	28 reps
All values from NFL Combine/Pro Day

=== Detroit Lions ===
Robinson was selected by the Detroit Lions in the seventh round, 240th overall, in the 2015 NFL draft. He made his NFL debut in Week 1 of the 2015 season against the San Diego Chargers before being inactive for the remainder of the season.

Robinson was placed on injured reserve on January 3, 2017 with a foot injury.

On September 12, 2017, Robinson was placed on injured reserve with a foot injury. He was activated off injured reserve to the active roster on November 11, 2017.

=== Carolina Panthers ===
On September 1, 2018, the Lions traded Robinson to the Carolina Panthers for a draft pick. He was released by the Panthers on September 25, 2018.

=== Jacksonville Jaguars ===
On November 19, 2018, Robinson was signed by the Jacksonville Jaguars.

=== Washington Redskins ===
On July 27, 2019, Robinson was signed by the Washington Redskins. He was waived on August 31, 2019.
