= 2014 West Virginia Mountaineers football team =

American college football season

2014 West Virginia Mountaineers football

Liberty Bowl, L 37–45 vs. Texas A&M
- Conference: Big 12 Conference
- Record: 7–6 (5–4 Big 12)
- Head coach: Dana Holgorsen (4th season)
- Offensive coordinator: Shannon Dawson (3rd season)
- Offensive scheme: Spread
- Defensive coordinator: Tony Gibson (1st season)
- Base defense: 3–3–5
- Home stadium: Mountaineer Field at Milan Puskar Stadium

2014 Big 12 Conference football standings
	Conf.			Overall
Team	W		L	W		L
No. 7 Baylor +	8	–	1	11	–	2
No. 3 TCU +	8	–	1	12	–	1
No. 18 Kansas State	7	–	2	9	–	4
Oklahoma	5	–	4	8	–	5
West Virginia	5	–	4	7	–	6
Texas	5	–	4	6	–	7
Oklahoma State	4	–	5	7	–	6
Texas Tech	2	–	7	4	–	8
Kansas	1	–	8	3	–	9
Iowa State	0	–	9	2	–	10
+ – Conference co-champions; Rankings from AP Poll

The 2014 West Virginia Mountaineers football team represented West Virginia University in the 2014 NCAA Division I FBS football season. Playing as a member of the Big 12 Conference (Big 12), the team was led by head coach Dana Holgorsen, in his fourth year. West Virginia played its home games at Mountaineer Field at Milan Puskar Stadium in Morgantown, West Virginia. They finished the season 7–6, 5–4 in Big 12 play to finish in a three way tie for fourth place. They were invited to the Liberty Bowl where they lost to Texas A&M.

== Schedule ==
Date	Time	Opponent	Rank	Site	TV	Result	Attendance
August 30	3:30 p.m.	vs. No. 2 Alabama*		Georgia Dome; Atlanta, GA (Chick-fil-A Kickoff Game)	ABC	L 23–33	70,502
September 6	7:30 p.m.	No. 22 (FCS) Towson*		Mountaineer Field; Morgantown, WV	RTPT	W 54–0	56,414
September 13	Noon	at Maryland*		Byrd Stadium; College Park, MD (rivalry)	BTN	W 40–37	48,154
September 20	7:30 p.m.	No. 4 Oklahoma		Mountaineer Field; Morgantown, WV (Stripe the Stadium)	FOX	L 33–45	61,908
October 4	4:00 p.m.	Kansas^{†}		Mountaineer Field; Morgantown, WV (Gold Rush)	FSN	W 33–14	52,164
October 11	Noon	at Texas Tech		Jones AT&T Stadium; Lubbock, TX	FS1	W 37–34	58,502
October 18	Noon	No. 4 Baylor		Mountaineer Field; Morgantown, WV	FS1	W 41–27	60,758
October 25	3:30 p.m.	at Oklahoma State	No. 22	Boone Pickens Stadium; Stillwater, OK	ESPN	W 34–10	59,124
November 1	3:30 p.m.	No. 7 TCU	No. 20	Mountaineer Field; Morgantown, WV (True Blue) (College GameDay)	ABC	L 30–31	61,190
November 8	3:30 p.m.	at Texas	No. 23	Darrell K Royal–Texas Memorial Stadium; Austin, TX	FS1	L 16–33	95,714
November 20	7:00 p.m.	No. 12 Kansas State		Mountaineer Field; Morgantown, WV	FS1	L 20–26	47,683
November 29	Noon	at Iowa State		Jack Trice Stadium; Ames, IA	FS1	W 37–24	50,059
December 29	2:00 p.m.	vs. Texas A&M*		Liberty Bowl Memorial Stadium; Memphis, TN (Liberty Bowl)	ESPN	L 37–45	51,282
*Non-conference game; ^{†}Homecoming; Rankings from AP Poll and CFP Rankings after October 28 released prior to game; All times are in Eastern time

== Rankings ==
Ranking movements Legend: ██ Increase in ranking ██ Decrease in ranking — = Not ranked RV = Received votes
	Week																
Poll	Pre	1	2	3	4	5	6	7	8	9	10	11	12	13	14	15	Final
AP	—	RV	RV	RV	RV	RV	RV	RV	22	20	24	RV	RV	RV	RV	RV	—
Coaches	—	RV	RV	RV	RV	RV	RV	RV	25	22	25	—	RV	—	—	—	—
CFP	Not released									20	23	—	—	—	—	—	Not released

== Game summaries ==
=== Alabama ===
	1	2	3	4	Total
Mountaineers	3	14	3	3	23
#2 Crimson Tide	3	17	10	3	33

Led by Clint Trickett's 511 passing yards, West Virginia gave away a 22-point lead before Josh Lambert kicked a game winning 47-yard field goal to give West Virginia a 40-37 win over rival Maryland. Clint Trickett threw for 4 touchdowns in the win and Mario Alford was on the receiving end of two of those touchdowns. Kevin White had his best game of the season with 13 catches for 216 yards and a touchdown. West Virginia’s defense held the Terrapins to 4 of 15 on third downs and forced an interception. This win erased the bad memory for the Mountaineers of the 37-0 blowout in the 2013 installment of this rivalry.

Attendance- 48,154 Byrd Stadium • College Park, MD

=== Oklahoma ===
	1	2	3	4	Total
#4 Sooners	3	21	14	7	45
Mountaineers	7	17	3	6	33

Samaje Perine rushed for 242 yards and four touchdowns to lead No. 4 Oklahoma to a 45-33 win in Morgantown over West Virginia. "They made good adjustments at halftime. They made a bunch of plays in the second half when the game was on the line" said West Virginia coach Dana Holgorsen. Clint Trickett threw for 376 yards and two touchdowns for West Virginia, but he was intercepted twice and lost a fumble. His main target in the loss was senior receiver Kevin White who had 10 receptions for 173 yards and a touchdown.

Attendance- 61,908 Mountaineer Field • Morgantown, WV

=== Kansas ===
	1	2	3	4	Total
Jayhawks	0	0	7	7	14
Mountaineers	16	10	7	0	33

Led by Clint Tricketts 302 passing yards and Mario Alford’s 94 yard kickoff return for a touchdown the Mountaineers beat Kansas 33-14. Rushel Shell ran for a season high 113 yards and a touchdown and Kevin White had 6 catches for 132 yards. West Virginia put up 557 yards of offense while the special teams played a very inconsistent game. After the Mountaineers' Jordan Thompson fumbled a punt on his 18 that led to a short touchdown run by the Jayhawks' Corey Avery, Alford took the ensuing kickoff into the endzone for a score to put West Virginia ahead 33-7 late in the third quarter.

Attendance- 52,164 Mountaineer Field • Morgantown, WV

=== Texas Tech ===
	1	2	3	4	Total
Mountaineers	3	7	10	17	37
Red Raiders	14	7	6	7	34

Sophomore Josh Lambert kicked a career-long 55-yard field goal at the end of the game to lead West Virginia to a 37-34 win over Texas Tech. The Red Raiders built an eleven point lead and carried that into halftime before being outscored 27 to 13 in the second half with the Mountaineers rallying from 14 points down in the fourth quarter. Clint Trickett was held to a season-low 301 yards but still completed 28 of 44 passes and had two touchdowns. Rushel Shell added two touchdowns, including the game tying one yard touchdown run late in the game. This was West Virginia’s first win against Texas Tech since joining the Big 12 conference 3 years ago.

Attendance- 58, 502 Jones AT&T Stadium • Lubbock, TX

=== Baylor ===
	1	2	3	4	Total
#4 Bears	13	7	7	0	27
Mountaineers	7	17	3	14	41

When West Virginia needed another late push to pull out a win, Clint Trickett and Kevin White fought through the rain, turnovers, and the Bears defense to beat fourth-ranked Baylor. Trickett threw two of his three touchdowns in the fourth quarter as West Virginia knocked off Baylor in Morgantown. It was the third top-5 opponent West Virginia faced that season after previously losing to No. 2 Alabama and No. 4 Oklahoma. Trickett was 23-of-35 for 322 yards against Baylor, his eighth straight 300-yard game dating back to the 2013 season. Senior receiver Kevin White had eight receptions for 132 yards and two touchdowns. The WVU defense, coached by Tony Gibson, held the Bears to seven second-half points and 318 total yards in the game.

Attendance- 60,758 Mountaineer Field Morgantown, WV

=== Oklahoma State ===
	1	2	3	4	Total
#22 Mountaineers	14	0	3	17	34
Cowboys	0	10	0	0	10

=== TCU ===
	1	2	3	4	Total
#10 Horned Frogs	7	0	14	10	31
#20 Mountaineers	13	0	14	3	30

ESPN's College Gameday made its second trip to Morgantown in its history.

=== Texas ===
	1	2	3	4	Total
#24 Mountaineers	3	0	0	13	16
Longhorns	7	17	0	9	33

=== Kansas State ===
	1	2	3	4	Total
#12 Wildcats	7	10	6	3	26
Mountaineers	0	3	7	10	20

=== Iowa State ===
	1	2	3	4	Total
Mountaineers	7	20	0	10	37
Cyclones	14	7	3	0	24

=== Texas A&M–Liberty Bowl ===
	1	2	3	4	Total
Aggies	14	14	17	0	45
Mountaineers	20	7	3	7	37

== Coaching staff ==
2014 Coaching Staff
Head coach; Dana Holgorsen: Associate Head coaches; Tom Bradley - Defensive Line Joe DeForest - Special Teams Coordinator, Safeties: Assistant Head coach; Lonnie Galloway - Receivers: Assistant coaches; Damon Cogdell - Linebackers Ron Crook - Offensive Line Shannon Dawson – Offensive Coordinator, Quarterbacks Tony Gibson - Defensive Coordinator Brian Mitchell - Cornerbacks Ja'Juan Seider - Running Backs
