= 2014 Baylor Bears football team =

American college football season

2014 Baylor Bears football

Big 12 Champion

Cotton Bowl Classic, L 41–42 vs. Michigan State
- Conference: Big 12 Conference

Ranking
- Coaches: No. 8
- AP: No. 7
- CFP: No. 5
- Record: 11–2 (8–1 Big 12)
- Head coach: Art Briles (7th season)
- Offensive coordinator: Philip Montgomery (7th season)
- Offensive scheme: Veer and shoot
- Defensive coordinator: Phil Bennett (4th season)
- Base defense: 4–3
- Home stadium: McLane Stadium

2014 Big 12 Conference football standings
| | Conf. | | | | Overall |
| Team | W | | L | | W | | L |
|---|---|---|---|---|---|---|---|
| No. 7 Baylor + | 8 | – | 1 | | 11 | – | 2 |
| No. 3 TCU | – | 8 | – | 1 | 12 | – | 1 |
| No. 18 Kansas State | 7 | – | 2 | | 9 | – | 4 |
| Oklahoma | 5 | – | 4 | | 8 | – | 5 |
| West Virginia | 5 | – | 4 | | 7 | – | 6 |
| Texas | 5 | – | 4 | | 6 | – | 7 |
| Oklahoma State | 4 | – | 5 | | 7 | – | 6 |
| Texas Tech | 2 | – | 7 | | 4 | – | 8 |
| Kansas | 1 | – | 8 | | 3 | – | 9 |
| Iowa State | 0 | – | 9 | | 2 | – | 10 |
Rankings from AP Poll

The 2014 Baylor Bears football team represented Baylor University in the 2014 NCAA Division I FBS football season. The Bears were coached by Art Briles. Playing their 116th football season, this was the team's first in the new McLane Stadium in Waco, Texas. The Bears were members of the Big 12 Conference. They finished the season 11–2, 8–1 in Big 12 play to finish as Champions. They were invited to the Cotton Bowl Classic where they lost to Michigan State 42-41, after blowing a 41–21 4th quarter lead. The Bears drew an average home attendance of 46,710. Baylor finished undefeated at home for the second consecutive season.

== Recruiting ==
College recruiting
| Name | Hometown | School | Height | Weight | 40^{‡} | Commit date |
|---|---|---|---|---|---|---|
| Davion Hall; WR | Texarkana, TX | Liberty-Eylau HS | 6 ft 2 in (1.88 m) | 194 lb (88 kg) | NA | Feb 2, 2013 |
| Davion Hall; WR | Recruit ratings: Scout: Rivals: 247Sports: (85) | | | | | |
| Chris Platt; WR | Willis, TX | Willis HS | 5 ft 10 in (1.78 m) | 157 lb (71 kg) | NA | Feb 3, 2013 |
| Chris Platt; WR | Recruit ratings: Scout: Rivals: 247Sports: (81) | | | | | |
| Devonte Jones; OG | Bellaire, TX | Bellaire HS | 6 ft 3 in (1.91 m) | 300 lb (140 kg) | NA | Apr 20, 2013 |
| Devonte Jones; OG | Recruit ratings: Scout: Rivals: 247Sports: (73) | | | | | |
| Terrence Williams; RB | Ennis, TX | Ennis HS | 6 ft 2 in (1.88 m) | 220 lb (100 kg) | 4.60 | Apr 24, 2013 |
| Terrence Williams; RB | Recruit ratings: Scout: Rivals: 247Sports: (80) | | | | | |
| Grant Campbell; MLB | Bakersfiel, CA | Bakersfield (JC) | 6 ft 1 in (1.85 m) | 225 lb (102 kg) | 5.10 | Dec 16, 2012 |
| Grant Campbell; MLB | Recruit ratings: Scout: Rivals: 247Sports: (73) | | | | | |
| Tion Wright; CB | Moorpark, CA | Moorpark (JC) | 5 ft 10 in (1.78 m) | 175 lb (79 kg) | 4.37 | Dec 16, 2012 |
| Tion Wright; CB | Recruit ratings: Scout: Rivals: 247Sports: (74) | | | | | |
| Chris Sanders; CB | Tucker, GA | East Arizona (JC) | 6 ft 1 in (1.85 m) | 185 lb (84 kg) | NA | Dec 16, 2012 |
| Chris Sanders; CB | Recruit ratings: Scout: Rivals: 247Sports: (78) | | | | | |
| KD Cannon; WR | Texarkana, TX | Liberty-Eylau HS | 6 ft 0 in (1.83 m) | 165 lb (75 kg) | 4.56 | Aug 10, 2013 |
| KD Cannon; WR | Recruit ratings: Scout: Rivals: 247Sports: (85) | | | | | |
Overall recruit ranking: Scout: 19 Rivals: 23 ESPN: 22
‡ Refers to 40-yard dash; Note: In many cases, Scout, Rivals, 247Sports, On3, and ESPN may conflict in their listings of height, weight and 40 time.; In these cases, the average was taken. ESPN grades are on a 100-point scale.; Sources: "2014 Team Ranking". Rivals.com.

== Schedule ==
| Date | Time | Opponent | Rank | Site | TV | Result | Attendance |
|---|---|---|---|---|---|---|---|
| August 31 | 6:30 p.m. | SMU* | No. 10 | McLane Stadium; Waco, TX | FS1 | W 45–0 | 45,733 |
| September 6 | 6:30 p.m. | Northwestern State* | No. 10 | McLane Stadium; Waco, TX | FSN | W 70–6 | 45,034 |
| September 12 | 7:00 p.m. | at Buffalo* | No. 8 | University at Buffalo Stadium; Amherst, NY | ESPN | W 63–21 | 24,714 |
| September 27 | 7:00 p.m. | at Iowa State | No. 7 | Jack Trice Stadium; Ames, IA | FOX | W 49–28 | 51,776 |
| October 4 | 2:30 p.m. | at Texas | No. 7 | Darrell K Royal–Texas Memorial Stadium; Austin, TX (rivalry) | ABC | W 28–7 | 93,727 |
| October 11 | 2:30 p.m. | No. 9 TCU | No. 5 | McLane Stadium; Waco, TX (rivalry) | ABC/ESPN2 | W 61–58 | 46,803 |
| October 18 | 11:00 a.m. | at West Virginia | No. 4 | Mountaineer Field; Morgantown, WV | FS1 | L 27–41 | 60,758 |
| November 1 | 3:00 p.m. | Kansas^{†} | No. 13 | McLane Stadium; Waco, TX | FS1 | W 60–14 | 47,574 |
| November 8 | 11:00 a.m. | at No. 15 Oklahoma | No. 12 | Gaylord Family Oklahoma Memorial Stadium; Norman, OK | FS1 | W 48–14 | 85,048 |
| November 22 | 6:30 p.m. | Oklahoma State | No. 7 | McLane Stadium; Waco, TX | FOX | W 49–28 | 47,179 |
| November 29 | 2:30 p.m. | vs. Texas Tech | No. 7 | AT&T Stadium; Arlington, TX (Texas Shootout) | ABC/ESPN2 | W 48–46 | 54,179 |
| December 6 | 6:45 p.m. | No. 9 Kansas State | No. 6 | McLane Stadium; Waco, TX (College GameDay) | ESPN | W 38–27 | 47,934 |
| January 1 | 11:30 a.m. | vs. No. 8 Michigan State* | No. 5 | AT&T Stadium; Arlington, TX (Cotton Bowl Classic) | ESPN | L 41–42 | 71,464 |
*Non-conference game; ^{†}Homecoming; Rankings from AP Poll and CFP Rankings after October 28 released prior to game; All times are in Central time

Schedule source:

== Roster ==
2014 Baylor Bears football team roster
Players
Coaches
Offense

| Pos. | # | Name | Class |
|---|---|---|---|
| WR | 1 | Corey Coleman | So |
| RB | 2 | Johnny Jefferson | Fr |
| WR | 4 | Jay Lee | Jr |
| WR | 5 | Antwan Goodley | Sr |
| QB | 6 | Andrew Frerking | Jr |
| WR | 7 | Lynx Hawthorne | So |
| WR | 8 | Ishmael Zamora | Fr |
| WR | 9 | K. D. Cannon | Fr |
| WR | 12 | Quan Jones | Fr |
| QB | 13 | Chris Johnson | Fr |
| QB | 14 | Bryce Petty | Sr |
| TE | 15 | Gus Penning | Jr |
| WR | 16 | Davion Hall | Fr |
| QB | 17 | Seth Russell | So |
| WR | 18 | Chris Platt | Fr |
| RB | 20 | Anthony Webb | Jr |
| RB | 22 | Terence Williams | Fr |
| WR | 23 | Clay Fuller | Sr |
| TE | 25 | Blake Mahon | Fr |
| WR | 26 | Brandon Brown | So |
| RB | 28 | Devin Chafin | So |
| WR | 30 | Tanner Ritchey | Fr |
| RB | 31 | Silas Nacita | So |
| RB | 32 | Shock Linwood | So |
| RB | 33 | Iain Hunter | Fr |
| TE | 41 | Tre'von Armstead | So |
| WR | 42 | Levi Norwood | Sr |
| OL | 52 | Rami Hammad | Fr |
| OL | 53 | Keith Orcutt | Fr |
| OL | 55 | Kyle Fuller | So |
| OL | 57 | Tanner Thrift | Fr |
| OL | 58 | Spencer Drango | Jr |
| OL | 61 | Jarell Broxton | Jr |
| OL | 62 | Tyler Edwards | Sr |
| OL | 66 | Drew Edwards | Sr |
| OL | 67 | Desmine Hilliard | Jr |
| OL | 68 | Ishmael Wilson | Fr |
| OL | 69 | Pat Colbert | Jr |
| OL | 70 | Josh Peltzel | Fr |
| OL | 72 | Blake Blackmar | Fr |
| OL | 73 | Blake Muir | Jr |
| OL | 74 | Sean Muir | Fr |
| OL | 75 | Troy Baker | Sr |
| OL | 76 | Jason Osei | So |
| OL | 77 | Patrick Lawrence | Fr |
| OL | 80 | LaQuan McGowan | Jr |
| WR | 80 | Cal Spangler | Jr |
| WR | 82 | Kaleb Moore | So |
| WR | 83 | Cole Edminston | Fr |
| TE | 85 | Jordan Feuerbacher | Fr |
| WR | 87 | Andy Ritter | So |
| WR | 89 | Trevor White | Fr |

Defense

| Pos. | # | Name | Class |
|---|---|---|---|
| CB | 1 | Chris Sanders | Jr |
| DE | 2 | Shawn Oakman | Jr |
| CB | 3 | Tion Wright | So |
| DB | 4 | Xavien Howard | So |
| LB | 5 | Grant Campbell | Jr |
| CB | 7 | Jourdan Blake | Fr |
| CB | 9 | Ryan Reid | So |
| LB | 11 | Taylor Young | Fr |
| S | 12 | Alfred Pollum | Fr |
| S | 13 | Terrell Burt | Jr |
| DE | 15 | Brian Nance | Fr |
| LB | 16 | Kendall Ehrlich | So |
| NB | 17 | Cordell Dorsey | Fr |
| S | 18 | Chance Waz | Fr |
| LB | 19 | Raaquan Davis | Fr |
| LB | 20 | Aiavion Edwards | So |
| NB | 21 | Patrick Levels | So |
| CB | 24 | Terrence Singleton | So |
| CB | 25 | Miles Johnson | Jr |
| S | 26 | Taion Sells | So |
| CB | 27 | Verkedric Vaughns | Fr |
| S | 28 | Orion Stewart | So |
| S | 29 | Jarrod Koym | Fr |
| S | 32 | Collin Simpson | Sr |
| NB | 34 | Lee Bristow | Jr |
| S | 35 | Mallory Franklin | Fr |
| CB | 37 | Tyler Jaynes | Fr |
| NB | 38 | Collin Brence | Sr |
| S | 41 | Calvin Hill | Fr |
| DE | 43 | Jamie Jacobs | Fr |
| LB | 44 | Bryce Hager | Sr |
| LB | 45 | Xavier Phillips | Fr |
| CB | 47 | Kevin Mitchell | Sr |
| NB | 48 | Travon Blanchard | Fr |
| DE | 51 | Nelson Ehirim | Sr |
| DE | 52 | Greg Roberts | Fr |
| LB | 55 | Baylor Black | So |
| DE | 56 | K.J. Smith | Fr |
| DT | 75 | Andrew Billings | So |
| DT | 88 | Terell Brooks | Sr |
| DE | 90 | Javonte Magee | So |
| DT | 91 | Andrew Morris | Fr |
| DE | 92 | Jamal Palmer | Jr |
| DT | 93 | Sleiman Masumbuko | Jr |
| DE | 94 | Xavier Jones | Fr |
| DT | 95 | Beau Blackshear | Jr |
| DT | 96 | Byron Bonds | So |
| DT | 97 | Ira Lewis | Fr |
| DT | 98 | Trevor Clemons-Valdez | Jr |
| DE | 99 | Josh Malin | Fr |

Special teams

| Pos. | # | Name | Class |
|---|---|---|---|
| P | 36 | Spencer Roth | Sr |
| K | 39 | Spencer Evans | Fr |
| PK | 40 | Chris Callahan | Fr |
| PK | 46 | Kyle Peterson | Sr |
| LS | 50 | Jimmy Landes | Jr |
| LS | 65 | B.J. Jordan | Jr |

Head coach

- Art Briles (7th season)

Coordinators/assistant coaches

- Philip Montgomery – Offensive Coordinator
- Phil Bennett – Defensive Coordinator
- Kendal Briles – Receivers / Offensive Recruiting Coordniator
- Randy Clements – Offensive Line
- Brian Norwood – Associate Head Coach / Safeties
- Chris Achuff – Defensive Line
- Carlton Buckels – Cornerbacks
- Jim Gush – Linebackers / Defensive Recruiting Coordniator
- Jeff Lebby – Running Backs
- Colin Shillinglaw – Assistant A.D. / Football Operations
- Beau Trahan – Director of Football Operations
- Jeff Barlow – Director of Equipment Services
- Brett Bufton – Assistant Director of Equipment Services
- Casey Horny – Assistant Director of Operations
- Odell James – Assistant Director of Operations
- Kaz Kazadi – Assistant A.D. / Athletic Performance
- Calvin Lowry – Assistant Director of Operations
- Mike Sims – Assistant A.D. / Athletic Training
- Austin Steele – Assistant Director of Operations
- Tate Wallis – Assistant Director of Operations

Legend

- (C) Team captain
- (S) Suspended
- (I) Ineligible
- Injured
- Redshirt

Roster
Last update: January 4, 2015

=== Returning starters ===
Offense

| No. | Player | Class | Position |
|---|---|---|---|
| 5 | Antwan Goodley | (redshirt) Senior | Wide Receiver |
| 14 | Bryce Petty | (redshirt) Senior | Quarterback |
| 23 | Clay Fuller | Senior | Wide Receiver |
| 42 | Levi Norwood | (redshirt) Senior | Wide Receiver |
| 58 | Spencer Drango | (redshirt) Junior | Left Tackle |
| 67 | Desmine Hilliard | (redshirt) Junior | Right Guard |
| 75 | Troy Baker | (redshirt) Senior | Right Tackle |

Defense

| No. | Player | Class | Position |
|---|---|---|---|
| 13 | Terrell Burt | Junior | Cover Safety |
| 44 | Bryce Hager | (redshirt) Senior | Middle Linebacker |
| 75 | Andrew Billings | Sophomore | Nose Tackle |
| 90 | Javonte Magee | Sophomore | Defensive Tackle |
| 95 | Beau Blackshear | (redshirt) Junior | Defensive Tackle |

Special teams

| No. | Player | Class | Position |
|---|---|---|---|
| 36 | Spencer Roth | Senior | Punter |

=== Depth chart ===
- Baylor Updated Depth Chart

Defense

FS
Terrell Burt Jr.
Chance Waz Fr.(RS)

| WLB | MLB | SLB |
|---|---|---|
| Taylor Young Fr.(RS) | Bryce Hager Sr. | Collin Brence Sr. |
| Aivion Edwards So. | Grant Campbell Jr. | Travon Blanchard Fr.(RS) |

DS
Orion Stewart So.
Alfred Pullom Fr.(RS)

CB
Ryan Reid So.
Tion Wright So.

| DE | DT | DT | DE |
|---|---|---|---|
| Shawn Oakman Jr. | Andrew Billings So. | Beau Blackshear Jr. | K.J. Smith Fr.(RS) |
| K.J. Smith Fr.(RS) | Javonte Magee So. | Byron Bonds So. | Javonte Magee So. |

CB
Xavien Howard So.
Terrance Singleton So.

Offense

WR
Antwan Goodley Sr.
Davion Hall Fr.

IR
K.D. Cannon Fr.
Clay Fuller Sr.

| LT | LG | C | RG | RT |
|---|---|---|---|---|
| Spencer Drango Jr. | Blake Muir Jr. | Kyle Fuller So. | Jarrell Broxton Jr. | Troy Baker Sr. |
| Tanner Thrift Fr. | LaQuan McGowan Jr. | Tyler Edwards Sr. | Desmine Hilliard Jr. | Jason Osei So. |

IR
Levi Norwood Sr.
Lynx Hawthorne So.

WR
Corey Coleman So.
Jay Lee Jr.

QB
Bryce Petty Sr.
Seth Russell So.

RB
Shock Linwood So.
Devin Chafin So.

Special teams
PK Chris Callahan Fr.(RS)
PK Kyle Peterson Jr.
P Spencer Roth Sr.
P Kyle Peterson Jr.
KR Levi Norwood Sr.
PR Levi Norwood Sr.
LS Jimmy Landes Jr.
H Andrew Frerking Jr.

== Game summaries ==
=== SMU ===
| | 1 | 2 | 3 | 4 | Total |
|---|---|---|---|---|---|
| Mustangs | 0 | 0 | 0 | 0 | 0 |
| No. 10 Bears | 24 | 7 | 7 | 7 | 45 |

| Statistics | SMU | BAY |
|---|---|---|
| First downs | 7 | 31 |
| Total yards | 67 | 574 |
| Rushing yards | -24 | 261 |
| Passing yards | 91 | 313 |
| Turnovers | 3 | 2 |
| Time of possession | 39:18 | 30:06 |

| Team | Category | Player | Statistics |
|---|---|---|---|
| SMU | Passing | Neal Burcham | 15/26, 59 yards |
| SMU | Rushing | Prescott Line | 4 rushes, 18 yards |
| SMU | Receiving | Derrikk Thompson | 2 receptions, 21 yards |
| Baylor | Passing | Bryce Petty | 13/23, 161 yards, 2 TD |
| Baylor | Rushing | Shock Linwood | 16 rushes, 89 yards, TD |
| Baylor | Receiving | Davion Hall | 7 receptions, 86 yards |

=== Northwestern State ===
| | 1 | 2 | 3 | 4 | Total |
|---|---|---|---|---|---|
| Demons | 0 | 3 | 3 | 0 | 6 |
| No. 10 Bears | 28 | 21 | 7 | 14 | 70 |

| Statistics | NWST | BAY |
|---|---|---|
| First downs | 11 | 32 |
| Total yards | 202 | 720 |
| Rushing yards | 78 | 265 |
| Passing yards | 124 | 455 |
| Turnovers | 1 | 2 |
| Time of possession | 32:08 | 27:52 |

| Team | Category | Player | Statistics |
|---|---|---|---|
| Northwestern State | Passing | Zach Adkins | 7/17, 112 yards, INT |
| Northwestern State | Rushing | Garrett Atzenweiler | 10 rushes, 32 yards |
| Northwestern State | Receiving | Ed Eagan | 2 receptions, 51 yards |
| Baylor | Passing | Seth Russell | 16/25, 438 yards, 5 TD |
| Baylor | Rushing | Johnny Jefferson | 20 rushes, 107 yards, TD |
| Baylor | Receiving | K. D. Cannon | 6 receptions, 223 yards, 3 TD |

=== At Buffalo ===
| | 1 | 2 | 3 | 4 | Total |
|---|---|---|---|---|---|
| No. 8 Bears | 21 | 14 | 14 | 14 | 63 |
| Bulls | 0 | 0 | 14 | 7 | 21 |

| Statistics | BAY | BUF |
|---|---|---|
| First downs | 27 | 15 |
| Total yards | 669 | 394 |
| Rushing yards | 189 | 139 |
| Passing yards | 480 | 255 |
| Turnovers | 0 | 1 |
| Time of possession | 24:56 | 35:04 |

| Team | Category | Player | Statistics |
|---|---|---|---|
| Baylor | Passing | Bryce Petty | 23/34, 416 yards, 4 TD |
| Baylor | Rushing | Shock Linwood | 20 rushes, 97 yards, 2 TD |
| Baylor | Receiving | K. D. Cannon | 6 receptions, 189 yards, TD |
| Buffalo | Passing | Joe Licata | 14/25, 171 yards, TD |
| Buffalo | Rushing | Jordan Johnson | 20 rushes, 97 yards |
| Buffalo | Receiving | Devon Hughes | 6 receptions, 72 yards, TD |

=== At Iowa State ===
| | 1 | 2 | 3 | 4 | Total |
|---|---|---|---|---|---|
| No. 7 Bears | 14 | 21 | 14 | 0 | 49 |
| Cyclones | 7 | 0 | 14 | 7 | 28 |

| Statistics | BAY | ISU |
|---|---|---|
| First downs | 32 | 18 |
| Total yards | 601 | 339 |
| Rushing yards | 244 | 127 |
| Passing yards | 357 | 212 |
| Turnovers | 1 | 1 |
| Time of possession | 32:02 | 27:32 |

| Team | Category | Player | Statistics |
|---|---|---|---|
| Baylor | Passing | Bryce Petty | 30/44, 336 yards, TD, INT |
| Baylor | Rushing | Shock Linwood | 15 rushes, 82 yards, 3 TD |
| Baylor | Receiving | Corey Coleman | 12 receptions, 154 yards, TD |
| Iowa State | Passing | Sam B. Richardson | 17/39, 212 yards, 2 TD, INT |
| Iowa State | Rushing | Sam B. Richardson | 14 rushes, 99 yards, TD |
| Iowa State | Receiving | Tad Ecby | 1 reception, 51 yards, TD |

=== At Texas ===
| | 1 | 2 | 3 | 4 | Total |
|---|---|---|---|---|---|
| No. 7 Bears | 7 | 0 | 7 | 14 | 28 |
| Longhorns | 0 | 0 | 0 | 7 | 7 |

| Statistics | BAY | TEX |
|---|---|---|
| First downs | 22 | 20 |
| Total yards | 389 | 334 |
| Rushing yards | 278 | 190 |
| Passing yards | 111 | 144 |
| Turnovers | 0 | 3 |
| Time of possession | 26:41 | 33:19 |

| Team | Category | Player | Statistics |
|---|---|---|---|
| Baylor | Passing | Bryce Petty | 7/22, 111 yards, 2 TD |
| Baylor | Rushing | Shock Linwood | 28 rushes, 148 yards, TD |
| Baylor | Receiving | Antwan Goodley | 4 receptions, 69 yards, TD |
| Texas | Passing | Tyrone Swoopes | 16/34, 144 yards, 2 INT |
| Texas | Rushing | Johnathan Gray | 12 rushes, 79 yards, TD |
| Texas | Receiving | John Harris | 1 reception, 34 yards |

=== No. 9 TCU ===
| Team | 1 | 2 | 3 | 4 | Total |
|---|---|---|---|---|---|
| No. 9 Horned Frogs | 14 | 17 | 13 | 14 | 58 |
| • No. 5 Bears | 10 | 17 | 10 | 24 | 61 |

- Date: October 11
- Location: McLane Stadium
  Waco, Texas
- Game start: 2:30 p.m. CDT
- Game attendance: 46,803
- Television network: ABC/ESPN2

Scoring summary
| Q1 | 9:32 | TCU | Listenbee 35 yard pass from Boykin (Oberkrom kick) | TCU 7–0 |
| Q1 | 7:40 | TCU | Catalon 3 yard run (Oberkrom kick) | TCU 14–0 |
| Q1 | 2:03 | BAY | Goodley 66 yard pass from Petty (Callahan kick) | TCU 14–7 |
| Q1 | :02 | BAY | Callahan 22 yard field goal | TCU 14–10 |
| Q2 | 10:15 | TCU | Catalon 9 yard run (Oberkrom kick) | TCU 21–10 |
| Q2 | 7:07 | BAY | Coleman 29 yard pass from Petty (Callahan kick) | TCU 21–17 |
| Q2 | 2:44 | TCU | Oberkrom 39 yard field goal | TCU 24–17 |
| Q2 | 1:49 | BAY | Cannon 67 yard pass from Petty (Callahan kick) | Tie 24–24 |
| Q2 | 1:38 | TCU | Catalon 94 yard kickoff return (Oberkrom kick) | TCU 31–24 |
| Q2 | :00 | BAY | Callahan 29 yard field goal | TCU 31–27 |
| Q3 | 8:42 | TCU | Oberkrom 20 yard field goal | TCU 34–27 |
| Q3 | 5:23 | BAY | Callahan 20 yard field goal | TCU 34–30 |
| Q3 | 3:53 | TCU | Johnson 2 yard run (Oberkrom kick) | TCU 41–30 |
| Q3 | 2:15 | TCU | Oberkrom 37 yard field goal | TCU 44–30 |
| Q3 | :35 | BAY | Lee 47 yard pass from Petty (Callahan kick) | TCU 44–37 |
| Q4 | 14:29 | TCU | Green 6 yard run (Oberkrom kick) | TCU 51–37 |
| Q4 | 11:38 | TCU | Mallett 49 yard interception return (Oberkrom kick) | TCU 58–37 |
| Q4 | 10:39 | BAY | Chafin 7 yard run (Callahan kick) | TCU 58–44 |
| Q4 | 6:39 | BAY | Goodley 28 yard pass from Petty (Callahan kick) | TCU 58–51 |
| Q4 | 4:42 | BAY | Coleman 25 yard pass from Petty (Callahan kick) | Tie 58–58 |
| Q4 | :00 | BAY | Callahan 28 yard field goal | BAY 61–58 |

| Statistics | TCU | BAY |
|---|---|---|
| First downs | 23 | 39 |
| Total yards | 485 | 782 |
| Rushing yards | 139 | 272 |
| Passing yards | 346 | 510 |
| Turnovers | 1 | 3 |
| Time of possession | 31:06 | 28:43 |

| Team | Category | Player | Statistics |
|---|---|---|---|
| TCU | Passing | Trevone Boykin | 21/47, 287 yards, TD |
| TCU | Rushing | Aaron Green | 3 rushes, 67 yards, TD |
| TCU | Receiving | Kolby Listenbee | 4 receptions, 146 yards, TD |
| Baylor | Passing | Bryce Petty | 28/55, 510 yards, 6 TD, 2 INT |
| Baylor | Rushing | Shock Linwood | 29 rushes, 178 yards |
| Baylor | Receiving | Antwan Goodley | 8 receptions, 158 yards, 2 TD |

=== At West Virginia ===
| | 1 | 2 | 3 | 4 | Total |
|---|---|---|---|---|---|
| No. 4 Bears | 13 | 7 | 7 | 0 | 27 |
| Mountaineers | 7 | 17 | 3 | 14 | 41 |

| Statistics | BAY | WVU |
|---|---|---|
| First downs | 22 | 33 |
| Total yards | 318 | 456 |
| Rushing yards | 95 | 134 |
| Passing yards | 223 | 322 |
| Turnovers | 0 | 3 |
| Time of possession | 29:17 | 30:43 |

| Team | Category | Player | Statistics |
|---|---|---|---|
| Baylor | Passing | Bryce Petty | 16/36, 223 yards, 2 TD |
| Baylor | Rushing | Shock Linwood | 21 rushes, 69 yards, TD |
| Baylor | Receiving | Antwan Goodwin | 9 receptions, 132 yards, TD |
| West Virginia | Passing | Clint Trickett | 23/35, 322 yards, 3 TD, INT |
| West Virginia | Rushing | Wendell Smallwood | 20 rushes, 66 yards |
| West Virginia | Receiving | Kevin White | 8 receptions, 132 yards, 2 TD |

=== Kansas ===
| | 1 | 2 | 3 | 4 | Total |
|---|---|---|---|---|---|
| Jayhawks | 7 | 0 | 7 | 0 | 14 |
| No. 12 Bears | 20 | 19 | 14 | 7 | 60 |

| Statistics | KU | BAY |
|---|---|---|
| First downs | 12 | 30 |
| Total yards | 304 | 669 |
| Rushing yards | 16 | 326 |
| Passing yards | 288 | 343 |
| Turnovers | 3 | 0 |
| Time of possession | 29:53 | 30:07 |

| Team | Category | Player | Statistics |
|---|---|---|---|
| Kansas | Passing | Michael Cummings | 21/30, 288 yards, 2 TD |
| Kansas | Rushing | Tony Pierson | 9 rushes, 31 yards |
| Kansas | Receiving | Corey Avery | 4 receptions, 92 yards |
| Baylor | Passing | Bryce Petty | 15/27, 277 yards, 3 TD |
| Baylor | Rushing | Devin Chafin | 14 rushes, 112 yards, 2 TD |
| Baylor | Receiving | Corey Coleman | 3 receptions, 167 yards, 2 TD |

=== At No. 15 Oklahoma ===
| | 1 | 2 | 3 | 4 | Total |
|---|---|---|---|---|---|
| No. 12 Bears | 3 | 21 | 14 | 10 | 48 |
| No. 15 Sooners | 14 | 0 | 0 | 0 | 14 |

| Statistics | BAY | OKLA |
|---|---|---|
| First downs | | |
| Total yards | | |
| Rushing yards | | |
| Passing yards | | |
| Turnovers | | |
| Time of possession | | |

| Team | Category | Player | Statistics |
|---|---|---|---|
| Baylor | Passing | | |
| Baylor | Rushing | | |
| Baylor | Receiving | | |
| Oklahoma | Passing | | |
| Oklahoma | Rushing | | |
| Oklahoma | Receiving | | |

=== Oklahoma State ===
| | 1 | 2 | 3 | 4 | Total |
|---|---|---|---|---|---|
| Cowboys | 7 | 7 | 0 | 14 | 28 |
| No. 6 Bears | 21 | 7 | 7 | 14 | 49 |

| Statistics | OKST | BAY |
|---|---|---|
| First downs | | |
| Total yards | | |
| Rushing yards | | |
| Passing yards | | |
| Turnovers | | |
| Time of possession | | |

| Team | Category | Player | Statistics |
|---|---|---|---|
| Oklahoma State | Passing | | |
| Oklahoma State | Rushing | | |
| Oklahoma State | Receiving | | |
| Baylor | Passing | | |
| Baylor | Rushing | | |
| Baylor | Receiving | | |

=== Vs. Texas Tech ===
| | 1 | 2 | 3 | 4 | Total |
|---|---|---|---|---|---|
| No. 5 Bears | 7 | 21 | 17 | 3 | 48 |
| Red Raiders | 0 | 17 | 10 | 19 | 46 |

| Statistics | BAY | TTU |
|---|---|---|
| First downs | 37 | 31 |
| Total yards | 547 | 712 |
| Rushing yards | 255 | 103 |
| Passing yards | 292 | 609 |
| Turnovers | 1 | 4 |
| Time of possession | 33:29 | 26:31 |

| Team | Category | Player | Statistics |
|---|---|---|---|
| Baylor | Passing | Bryce Petty | 18/25, 210 yards, 2 TD |
| Baylor | Rushing | Shock Linwood | 24 rushes, 158 yards, 2 TD |
| Baylor | Receiving | Levi Norwood | 5 receptions, 63 yards, TD |
| Texas Tech | Passing | Patrick Mahomes | 30/56, 598 yards, 6 TD, INT |
| Texas Tech | Rushing | DeAndré Washington | 15 rushes, 65 yards |
| Texas Tech | Receiving | Jakeem Grant | 5 receptions, 155 yards, TD |

=== No. 9 Kansas State ===
| | 1 | 2 | 3 | 4 | Total |
|---|---|---|---|---|---|
| No. 9 Wildcats | 0 | 14 | 6 | 7 | 27 |
| No. 5 Bears | 14 | 10 | 14 | 0 | 38 |

| Statistics | KSU | BAY |
|---|---|---|
| First downs | | |
| Total yards | | |
| Rushing yards | | |
| Passing yards | | |
| Turnovers | | |
| Time of possession | | |

| Team | Category | Player | Statistics |
|---|---|---|---|
| Kansas State | Passing | | |
| Kansas State | Rushing | | |
| Kansas State | Receiving | | |
| Baylor | Passing | | |
| Baylor | Rushing | | |
| Baylor | Receiving | | |

=== Vs. No. 7 Michigan State (Cotton Bowl Classic) ===
| | 1 | 2 | 3 | 4 | Total |
|---|---|---|---|---|---|
| No. 7 Spartans | 14 | 0 | 7 | 21 | 42 |
| No. 4 Bears | 14 | 10 | 17 | 0 | 41 |

| Statistics | MSU | BAY |
|---|---|---|
| First downs | | |
| Total yards | | |
| Rushing yards | | |
| Passing yards | | |
| Turnovers | | |
| Time of possession | | |

| Team | Category | Player | Statistics |
|---|---|---|---|
| Michigan State | Passing | | |
| Michigan State | Rushing | | |
| Michigan State | Receiving | | |
| Baylor | Passing | | |
| Baylor | Rushing | | |
| Baylor | Receiving | | |

== Rankings ==
Ranking movements Legend: ██ Increase in ranking ██ Decrease in ranking ( ) = First-place votes
| | Week | | | | | | | | | | | | | | | | |
| Poll | Pre | 1 | 2 | 3 | 4 | 5 | 6 | 7 | 8 | 9 | 10 | 11 | 12 | 13 | 14 | 15 | Final |
|---|---|---|---|---|---|---|---|---|---|---|---|---|---|---|---|---|---|
| AP | 10 | 10 | 8 | 7 | 7 | 7 | 5 | 4 | 12 | 12 | 10 | 6 | 6 | 5 | 5 | 4 | 7 |
| Coaches | 10 | 9 | 7 | 6 | 6 | 6 | 3 (1) | 4 | 13 | 12 | 10 | 6 | 6 | 6 | 5 | 5 | 8 |
| CFP | Not released | | | | | | | | | 13 | 12 | 7 | 7 | 7 | 6 | 5 | Not released |
