= 2014 Ole Miss Rebels football team =

American college football season

2014 Ole Miss Rebels football

Peach Bowl, L 3–42 vs. TCU
- Conference: Southeastern Conference
- Western Division

Ranking
- Coaches: No. 19
- AP: No. 17
- Record: 1–4, 8 wins vacated (0–3 SEC, 5 wins vacated)
- Head coach: Hugh Freeze (3rd season)
- Co-offensive coordinators: Matt Luke (3rd season); Dan Werner (5th season)
- Offensive scheme: Spread
- Co-defensive coordinators: Dave Wommack (3rd season); Jason Jones (2nd season)
- Base defense: 4–2–5
- Captain: Game captains
- Home stadium: Vaught–Hemingway Stadium

2014 Southeastern Conference football standings
	Conf.			Overall
Team	W		L	W		L
Eastern Division
No. 14 Missouri x	7	–	1	11	–	3
No. 9 Georgia	6	–	2	10	–	3
Florida	4	–	4	7	–	5
Tennessee	3	–	5	7	–	6
South Carolina	3	–	5	7	–	6
Kentucky	2	–	6	5	–	7
Vanderbilt	0	–	8	3	–	9
Western Division
No. 4 Alabama x$^	7	–	1	12	–	2
No. 11 Mississippi State	6	–	2	10	–	3
No. 17 Ole Miss *	5	–	3	9	–	4
No. 22 Auburn	4	–	4	8	–	5
LSU *	4	–	4	8	–	5
Texas A&M	3	–	5	8	–	5
Arkansas	2	–	6	7	–	6
Championship: Alabama 42, Missouri 13
^ – College Football Playoff participant; $ – Conference champion; x – Division champion/co-champions; * LSU and Ole Miss vacated all wins (except for Ole Miss' win over Presbyterian) due to NCAA violations.; Rankings from AP Poll

The 2014 Ole Miss Rebels football team represented the University of Mississippi in the 2014 NCAA Division I FBS football season. The team was coached by Hugh Freeze, in his third season with Ole Miss. The Rebels played their home games at Vaught–Hemingway Stadium in Oxford, Mississippi, and competed in the Western Division of the Southeastern Conference (SEC).

The Rebels won the first seven games of the season, their best start since the Johnny Vaught era. By October, they had risen as high as third in the nation, the highest they had been ranked at that late date in over half a century. However, the team ended their season losing four of their six last games, including a season-ending 42-3 loss to TCU in the Peach Bowl, their first major bowl appearance since the 1970 Sugar Bowl, and easily the biggest bowl game they had attended since Vaught's tenure. They finished the season as only the sixth Ole Miss team to win nine or more games since Vaught retired in 1973.

On February 11, 2019 Ole Miss announced the vacation of all wins in the years 2010, 2011, 2012, and 2016. In 2013, all wins except the Music City Bowl were vacated. In 2014, all wins except the Presbyterian game were vacated.

== Before the season ==
=== National award watch lists ===
- Outland - Laremy Tunsil
- Maxwell - Chad Kelly
- Unitas Golden Arm - Bo Wallace
- Manning - Bo Wallace
- O'Brien - Bo Wallace
- Lombardi - Robert Nkemdiche
- Nagurski - Robert Nkemdiche
- Outland - Robert Nkemdiche
- Camp - Cody Prewitt
- Bednarik - Cody Prewitt
- Thorpe - Cody Prewitt
- Biletnikoff - Laquon Treadwell
- Camp - Cody Prewitt
- Bednarik - Cody Prewitt
- Mackey - Evan Engram
- CLASS - Deterrian Shackelford

=== Preseason All-America ===
- S Cody Prewitt
  - Sports Illustrated, Phil Steele, Lindy's (1st team)
- OL Laremy Tunsil
  - Sporting News, USA Today (1st team)
- DL Robert Nkemdiche
  - Athlon, USA Today (2nd team)
- WR Laquon Treadwell
  - Athlon (3rd team)
- TE Evan Engram
  - Sporting News (3rd team)

=== Preseason All-SEC ===
- S Cody Prewitt
  - Media, Coaches, Athlon, USA Today, Phil Steele, Lindy's (1st team)
- OL Laremy Tunsil
  - Media, Coaches, Athlon, USA Today, Lindy's (1st team)
- DL Robert Nkemdiche
  - Media, Coaches, Athlon, Phil Steele (1st team)
- WR Laquon Treadwell
  - Athlon, USA Today (1st team)
- QB Bo Wallace
  - Coaches, Athlon, Phil Steele, Lindy's (2nd team)
- S Tony Conner
  - Media, Coaches, Athlon, Phil Steele, Lindy's (2nd team)
- LB Serderius Bryant
  - Phil Steele, Lindy's (2nd team)
- OL Aaron Moris
  - Athlon (2nd team)
- LB Denzel Nkemdiche
  - Media (2nd team)
- DL C.J. Johnson
  - Lindy's (3rd team)
- TE Evan Engram
  - Athlon (3rd team)

=== Returning starters ===
==== Offense ====
Player	Class	Position
Bo Wallace	Senior	QB
Laquon Treadwell	Sophomore	WR
Jaylen Walton	Junior	RB
Evan Engram	Sophomore	TE
Laremy Tunsil	Sophomore	OL
Justin Bell	Junior	OL

==== Defense ====
Player	Class	Position
Robert Nkemdiche	Sophomore	DL
Byron Bennett	Senior	DL
Woodrow Hamilton	Senior	DL
Serderius Bryant	Senior	LB
Tony Conner	Sophomore	S
Cody Prewitt	Senior	S
Trae Elston	Junior	S
Senquez Golson	Senior	CB
Mike Hilton	Senior	CB

==== Special teams ====
Player	Class	Position
Will Denny	Senior	LS

== Personnel ==
=== Coaching staff ===
Name	Position	Year at Ole Miss	Alma mater (Year)
Hugh Freeze	Head Coach	3rd	Southern Miss (1992)
Matt Luke	Assistant head coach/co-offensive coordinator/offensive line	3rd	Ole Miss (2000)
Dan Werner	Co-offensive coordinator/quarterbacks	3rd	Western Michigan (1983)
Maurice Harris	Tight ends/recruiting coordinator For Offense	3rd	Arkansas State (1998)
Grant Heard	Wide receivers	3rd	Ole Miss (2001)
Derrick Nix	Running backs	7th	Southern Miss (2002)
Jason Jones	Co-defensive coordinator/cornerbacks	2nd	Alabama (2001)
Dave Wommack	Associate head coach for Defense/co-defensive coordinator/safeties	3rd	Missouri Southern State (1978)
Tom Allen	Special teams coordinator/linebackers	3rd	Maranatha Baptist (1992)
Chris Kiffin	Defensive line/recruiting coordinator For Defense	3rd	Colorado State (2005)
Paul Jackson	Head strength & conditioning coach	3rd	Montclair State (2006)

=== Roster ===
Official team roster

=== Depth chart ===
Depth chart

== Schedule ==
Ole Miss played their first two games out of state vs. Boise State and Vanderbilt. Both games were played at NFL stadiums. The Boise State game was considered a neutral site while the Vandy game was a home game for Vanderbilt. Due to conference realignment, Ole Miss played at Vanderbilt for the second consecutive year.

Date	Time	Opponent	Rank	Site	TV	Result	Attendance
August 28	8:00 p.m.	vs. Boise State*	No. 18	Georgia Dome; Atlanta, GA (Chick-fil-A Kickoff Game)	ESPN	W 35–13 (vacated)	32,823
September 6	3:30 p.m.	at Vanderbilt	No. 15	LP Field; Nashville, TN (rivalry / SEC Nation)	ESPN	W 41–3 (vacated)	43,260
September 13	3:00 p.m.	Louisiana–Lafayette*	No. 14	Vaught–Hemingway Stadium; Oxford, MS	SECN	W 56–15 (vacated)	60,937
September 27	6:30 p.m.	Memphis*	No. 10	Vaught–Hemingway Stadium; Oxford, MS (rivalry)	SECRN	W 24–3 (vacated)	61,291
October 4	2:30 p.m.	No. 3 Alabama	No. 11	Vaught–Hemingway Stadium; Oxford, MS (rivalry) (College GameDay)	CBS	W 23–17 (vacated)	61,826
October 11	8:00 p.m.	at No. 14 Texas A&M	No. 3	Kyle Field; College Station, TX	ESPN	W 35–20 (vacated)	110,633
October 18	6:00 p.m.	Tennessee^{†}	No. 3	Vaught–Hemingway Stadium; Oxford, MS (SEC Nation) (rivalry)	ESPN	W 34–3 (vacated)	62,081
October 25	6:15 p.m.	at No. 24 LSU	No. 3	Tiger Stadium; Baton Rouge, LA (Magnolia Bowl) (College GameDay)	ESPN	L 7–10	102,321
November 1	7:00 p.m.	No. 3 Auburn	No. 4	Vaught–Hemingway Stadium; Oxford, MS (rivalry)	ESPN	L 31–35	62,090
November 8	11:00 a.m.	Presbyterian*	No. 11	Vaught–Hemingway Stadium; Oxford, MS	SECN	W 48–0	60,546
November 22	2:30 p.m.	at Arkansas	No. 8	Donald W. Reynolds Razorback Stadium; Fayetteville, AR (rivalry)	CBS	L 0–30	64,510
November 29	2:30 p.m.	No. 4 Mississippi State	No. 19	Vaught–Hemingway Stadium; Oxford, MS (Egg Bowl / SEC Nation)	CBS	W 31–17 (vacated)	62,058
December 31	11:30 a.m.	vs. No. 6 TCU*	No. 9	Georgia Dome; Atlanta, GA (Peach Bowl)	ESPN	L 3–42	65,706
*Non-conference game; ^{†}Homecoming; Rankings from AP Poll and College Football Playoff poll beginning Oct 28 released prior to game; All times are in Central time

Schedule source:

== Rankings ==
Ranking movements Legend: ██ Increase in ranking ██ Decrease in ranking ( ) = First-place votes
	Week																
Poll	Pre	1	2	3	4	5	6	7	8	9	10	11	12	13	14	15	Final
AP	18	15	14	10	10	11	3	3 (3)	3 (3)	7	12	10	8	18	13	9	17
Coaches	19	17	15	12	11	11	4	3 (5)	3 (4)	9	13	10	8	19	14	12	19
CFP	Not released									4	11	10	8	19	12	9	Not released

== Game summaries ==
=== Vs. Boise State ===
Uniform Combination
Helmet	Jersey	Pants

Boise State Broncos (0–0) vs. No. 18 Ole Miss Rebels (0–0)

Quarter	1	2	3	4	Total
Broncos	0	3	3	7	13
No. 18 Rebels	7	0	0	28	35

at Georgia Dome • Atlanta, GA

- Date: Thursday, August 28, 2014
- Game time: 8:00 p.m. CST (9:00 p.m. local EST)
- Game weather: None (indoor stadium)
- Game attendance: 32,823
- Referee: Matt Loeffler
- TV announcers (ESPN):
  Rece Davis (play-by-play)
  Todd Blackledge (color)
  Samantha Ponder (sideline)

Game information

First Quarter

- (0:57) Ole Miss – Cody Core 30 Yd pass from Bo Wallace (Andrew Fletcher Kick)
  Ole Miss 7–0; 9 plays, 80 yards, 3:26

Second Quarter

- (7:58) Boise State – Dan Goodale 25 Yd Field Goal
  Ole Miss 7–3; 12 plays, 65 yards, 5:16

Third Quarter

- (1:02) Boise State – Dan Goodale 43 Yd Field Goal
  Ole Miss 7–6; 9 plays, 42 yards, 3:36

Fourth Quarter

- (12:26) Ole Miss – Laquon Treadwell 14 Yd pass from Bo Wallace (Andrew Fletcher Kick)
  Ole Miss 14–6; 11 plays, 75 yards, 3:36
- (10:05) Ole Miss – Quincy Adeboyejo 31 Yd pass from Bo Wallace (Andrew Fletcher Kick)
  Ole Miss 21–6; 2 plays, 40 yards, 0:36
- (7:45) Ole Miss – Cody Core 76 Yd pass from Bo Wallace (Andrew Fletcher Kick)
  Ole Miss 28–6; 1 play, 76 yards, 0:11
- (4:26) Boise State – Jay Ajayi 8 Yd pass from Grant Hedrick (Dan Goodale Kick)
  Ole Miss 28–13; 12 plays, 73 yards, 3:11
- (2:50) Ole Miss – Mark Dodson 19 Yd Run (Andrew Fletcher Kick)
  Ole Miss 35–13; 5 plays, 40 yards, 1:36

Statistics	BSU	MISS
First downs	26	22
Total yards	399	458
Rushes/yards	37/135	34/71
Passing yards	264	387
Passing: Comp–Att–Int	36–48–4	25–36–3
Time of possession	36:14	23:46

Team	Category	Player	Statistics
Boise State	Passing	Grant Hedrick	36/46, 264 yards, 1 TD, 4 INT
Boise State	Rushing	Jay Ajayi	20 carries, 86 yards
Boise State	Receiving	Jay Ajayi	12 receptions, 93 yards, 1 TD
Ole Miss	Passing	Bo Wallace	25/36, 387 yards, 4 TD, 3 INT
Ole Miss	Rushing	Mark Dodson	4 carries, 27 yards, 1 TD
Ole Miss	Receiving	Cody Core	4 receptions, 110 yards, 2 TD

=== At Vanderbilt ===
Uniform Combination
Helmet	Jersey	Pants

No. 15 Ole Miss Rebels (1–0) at Vanderbilt Commodores (0–1)

Quarter	1	2	3	4	Total
No. 15 Rebels	10	10	21	0	41
Commodores	0	0	0	3	3

at LP Field • Nashville, TN

- Date: Saturday, September 6, 2014
- Game time: 2:30 p.m. CST (3:30 p.m. local EST)
- Game weather: Mostly Cloudy • Temperature: 82 °F (28 °C)
- Game attendance: 43,260
- Referee: Marc Curles
- TV announcers (ESPN):
  Joe Tessitore (play-by-play)
  Brock Huard (color)
  Shannon Spake (sideline)

Game information

First Quarter

- (10:28) Ole Miss – Jaylen Walton 20 Yd Run (Andrew Fletcher Kick)
  Ole Miss 7–0; 11 plays, 75 yards, 4:32
- (3:06) Ole Miss – Andrew Fletcher 31 Yd Field Goal
  Ole Miss 10–0; 12 plays, 67 yards, 5:16

Second Quarter

- (9:19) Ole Miss – Andrew Fletcher 25 Yd Field Goal
  Ole Miss 13–0; 15 plays, 72 yards, 5:52
- (4:42) Ole Miss – Cody Core 20 Yd pass from Bo Wallace (Andrew Fletcher Kick)
  Ole Miss 20–0; 7 plays, 73 yards, 2:11

Third Quarter

- (14:10) Ole Miss – Cliff Coleman 39 Yd Interception Return (Andrew Fletcher Kick)
  Ole Miss 27–0; 2 plays, 6 yards, 0:50
- (9:29) Ole Miss – I'Tavius Mathers 2 Yd Run (Andrew Fletcher Kick)
  Ole Miss 34–0; 10 plays, 79 yards, 3:09
- (3:02) Ole Miss – DeVante Kincade 2 Yd Run (Andrew Fletcher Kick)
  Ole Miss 41–0; 13 plays, 68 yards, 5:20

Fourth Quarter

- (10:23) Vanderbilt – Tommy Openshaw 26 Yd Field Goal
  Ole Miss 41–3; 4 plays, -4 yards, 0:48

Statistics	MISS	VAN
First downs	34	9
Total yards	547	167
Rushes/yards	50/180	25/107
Passing yards	367	60
Passing: Comp–Att–Int	28–38–0	6–25–1
Time of possession	37:26	22:34

Team	Category	Player	Statistics
Ole Miss	Passing	Bo Wallace	23/30, 320 yards, 1 TD
Ole Miss	Rushing	Jaylen Walton	8 carries, 35 yards, 1 TD
Ole Miss	Receiving	Evan Engram	7 receptions, 112 yards
Vanderbilt	Passing	Stephen Rivers	6/25, 60 yards, 1 INT
Vanderbilt	Rushing	Ralph Webb	18 carries, 95 yards
Vanderbilt	Receiving	Steven Scheau	3 receptions, 34 yards

=== Louisiana–Lafayette ===
Uniform Combination
Helmet	Jersey	Pants

Louisiana–Lafayette Ragin' Cajuns (1–1) at No. 14 Ole Miss Rebels (2–0)

Quarter	1	2	3	4	Total
Ragin' Cajuns	0	6	7	2	15
No. 14 Rebels	14	14	21	7	56

at Vaught–Hemingway Stadium • Oxford, MS

- Date: Saturday, September 13, 2014
- Game time: 3:00 p.m. CST
- Game weather: Overcast • Temperature: 69 °F (21 °C)
- Game attendance: 60,937
- Referee: Tim Ritter
- TV announcers (SECN):
  Tom Hart (play-by-play)
  Matt Stinchcomb (color)
  Heather Mitts (sideline)

Game information

First Quarter

- (10:00) Ole Miss – I'Tavius Mathers 56 Yd Run (Andrew Fletcher Kick)
  Ole Miss 7–0; 3 plays, 73 yards, 0:54
- (3:45) Ole Miss – Jaylen Walton 40 Yd pass from Bo Wallace (Andrew Fletcher Kick)
  Ole Miss 14–0; 7 plays, 94 yards, 2:32

Second Quarter

- (12:37) Ole Miss – Vince Sanders 14 Yd pass from Bo Wallace (Andrew Fletcher Kick)
  Ole Miss 21–0; 9 plays, 69 yards, 4:59
- (7:08) Ole Miss – Vince Sanders 24 Yd pass from Bo Wallace (Andrew Fletcher Kick)
  Ole Miss 28–0; 5 plays, 48 yards, 2:17
- (1:55) Louisiana–Lafayette – Hunter Stover 32 Yd Field Goal
  Ole Miss 28–3; 12 plays, 60 yards, 5:13
- (0:09) Louisiana–Lafayette – Hunter Stover 20 Yd Field Goal
  Ole Miss 28–6; 5 plays, 20 yards, 0:25

Third Quarter

- (10:30) Ole Miss – Cody Core 13 Yd pass from Bo Wallace (Andrew Fletcher Kick)
  Ole Miss 35–6; 9 plays, 43 yards, 3:06
- (9:11) Ole Miss – Senquez Golson 59 Yd Interception Return (Andrew Fletcher Kick)
  Ole Miss 42–6; 4 plays, 31 yards, 1:19
- (7:48) Ole Miss – Jaylen Walton 71 Yd Run (Andrew Fletcher Kick)
  Ole Miss 49–6; 1 play, 71 yards, 0:14
- (1:04) Louisiana–Lafayette – Alonzo Harris 8 Yd Run (Hunter Stover Kick)
  Ole Miss 49–13; 15 plays, 75 yards, 6:44

Fourth Quarter

- (5:16) Ole Miss – Jeremy Liggins 2 Yd Run (Andrew Fletcher Kick)
  Ole Miss 56–13; 17 plays, 79 yards, 7:46
- (2:25) Louisiana–Lafayette – Team Safety
  Ole Miss 56–15

Statistics	ULL	MISS
First downs	18	27
Total yards	322	554
Rushes/yards	37/193	35/214
Passing yards	129	340
Passing: Comp–Att–Int	15–31–0	29–36–1
Time of possession	31:19	28:41

Team	Category	Player	Statistics
Louisiana–Lafayette	Passing	Terrance Broadway	15/30, 129 yards, 3 INT
Louisiana–Lafayette	Rushing	Elijah McGuire	10 carries, 66 yards
Louisiana–Lafayette	Receiving	James Butler	5 receptions, 33 yards
Ole Miss	Passing	Bo Wallace	23/28, 316 yards, 4 TD, 1 INT
Ole Miss	Rushing	Jaylen Walton	7 carries, 89 yards, 1 TD
Ole Miss	Receiving	Vince Sanders	8 carries, 125 yards, 2 TD

=== Memphis ===
Uniform Combination
Helmet	Jersey	Pants

Memphis Tigers (2–1) at No. 10 Ole Miss Rebels (3–0)

Quarter	1	2	3	4	Total
Tigers	3	0	0	0	3
No. 10 Rebels	7	0	0	17	24

at Vaught–Hemingway Stadium • Oxford, MS

- Date: Saturday, September 27, 2014
- Game time: 6:30 p.m. CST
- Game weather: Sunny • Temperature: 77 °F (25 °C)
- Game attendance: 61,291
- Referee: Michael Roche
- TV announcers (SECRN):
  Bob Rathbun (play-by-play)
  Tim Couch (color)
  Olivia Harlan (sideline)

Game information

First Quarter

- (12:01) Ole Miss – Laquon Treadwell 63 Yd pass from Bo Wallace (Andrew Fletcher Kick)
  Ole Miss 7–0; 2 plays, 64 yards, 0:41
- (2:51) Memphis – Jake Elliott 40 Yd Field Goal
  Ole Miss 7–3; 9 plays, 51 yards, 3:55

Second Quarter

- No scoring plays

Third Quarter

- No scoring plays

Fourth Quarter

- (13:04) Ole Miss – Andrew Fletcher 19 Yd Field Goal
  Ole Miss 10–3; 17 plays, 75 yards, 7:51
- (9:34) Ole Miss – Jaylen Walton 23 Yd Run (Andrew Fletcher Kick)
  Ole Miss 17–3; 1 play, 23 yards, 0:08
- (1:18) Ole Miss – Laquon Treadwell 17 Yd pass from Bo Wallace (Andrew Fletcher Kick)
  Ole Miss 24–3; 7 plays, 67 yards, 3:48

Statistics	MEM	MISS
First downs	13	26
Total yards	104	426
Rushes/yards	37/193	35/214
Passing yards	81	248
Passing: Comp–Att–Int	13–31–1	22–37–2
Time of possession	23:05	43:13

Team	Category	Player	Statistics
Memphis	Passing	Paxton Lynch	13/31, 81 yards, 1 INT
Memphis	Rushing	Jarvis Cooper	7 carries, 29 yards
Memphis	Receiving	Keiwone Malone	4 receptions, 59 yards
Ole Miss	Passing	Bo Wallace	22/37, 248 yards, 2 TD, 2 INT
Ole Miss	Rushing	Jaylen Walton	10 carries, 78 yards, 1 TD
Ole Miss	Receiving	Laquon Treadwell	5 carries, 123 yards, 2 TD

=== No. 3 Alabama ===
Uniform Combination
Helmet	Jersey	Pants

No. 3 Alabama Crimson Tide (4–0) at No. 11 Ole Miss Rebels (4–0)

Quarter	1	2	3	4	Total
No. 3 Crimson Tide	0	14	3	0	17
No. 11 Rebels	3	0	7	13	23

at Vaught–Hemingway Stadium • Oxford, MS

- Date: Saturday, October 4, 2014
- Game time: 2:30 p.m. CST
- Game weather: Sunny • Temperature: 63 °F (17 °C)
- Game attendance: 61,826
- Referee: Matt Loeffler
- TV announcers (CBS):
  Verne Lundquist (play-by-play)
  Gary Danielson (color)
  Allie LaForce (sideline)

Game information

First Quarter

- (13:17) Ole Miss – Gary Wunderlich 46 Yd Field Goal
  Ole Miss 3–0; 5 plays, 10 yards, 1:43

Second Quarter

- (3:44) Alabama – Blake Sims 1 Yd Run (Adam Griffith Kick)
  Alabama 7–3; 12 plays, 68 yards, 3:27
- (0:42) Alabama – Cyrus Jones 17 Yd Fumble Return (Adam Griffith Kick)
  Alabama 14–3

Third Quarter

- (7:20) Ole Miss – Laquon Treadwell 14 Yd pass from Bo Wallace (Gary Wunderlich Kick)
  Alabama 14–10; 4 plays, 66 yards, 1:15
- (3:54) Alabama – Adam Griffith 44 Yd Field Goal
  Alabama 17–10; 7 plays, 59 yards, 3:26

Fourth Quarter

- (5:29) Ole Miss – Vince Sanders 34 Yd pass from Bo Wallace (Gary Wunderlich Kick)
  Tied 17–17; 3 plays, 56 yards, 0:55
- (2:54) Ole Miss – Jaylen Walton 10 Yd pass from Bo Wallace (Andrew Fletcher Kick blocked)
  Ole Miss 23–17; 5 plays, 31 yards, 2:35

Statistics	ALA	MISS
First downs	20	16
Total yards	396	327
Rushes/yards	44/168	32/76
Passing yards	228	251
Passing: Comp–Att–Int	19–31–1	18–31–0
Time of possession	33:21	26:37

Team	Category	Player	Statistics
Alabama	Passing	Blake Sims	19/31, 228 yards, 1 INT
Alabama	Rushing	T.J. Yeldon	20 carries, 123 yards
Alabama	Receiving	Amari Cooper	9 receptions, 91 yards
Ole Miss	Passing	Bo Wallace	18/31, 251 yards, 3 TD
Ole Miss	Rushing	Jaylen Walton	11 carries, 39 yards
Ole Miss	Receiving	Evan Engram	3 receptions, 71 yards

=== At No. 14 Texas A&M ===
Uniform Combination
Helmet	Jersey	Pants

No. 3 Ole Miss Rebels (5–0) at No. 14 Texas A&M Aggies (5–1)

Quarter	1	2	3	4	Total
No. 3 Rebels	14	7	7	7	35
No. 14 Aggies	0	0	7	13	20

at Kyle Field • College Station, TX

- Date: Saturday, October 11, 2014
- Game time: 8:00 p.m. CST
- Game weather: Overcast • Temperature: 64 °F (18 °C)
- Game attendance: *110,633
- Referee: Matt Moore
- TV announcers (ESPN):
  Chris Fowler (play-by-play)
  Kirk Herbstreit (color)
  Heather Cox (sideline)

Game information

First Quarter

- (9:32) Ole Miss – Bo Wallace 4 Yd Run (Gary Wunderlich Kick)
  Ole Miss 7–0; 5 plays, 69 yards, 1:25
- (2:04) Ole Miss – Bo Wallace 10 Yd Run (Gary Wunderlich Kick)
  Ole Miss 14–0; 9 plays, 99 yards, 4:09

Second Quarter

- (11:56) Ole Miss – Cody Prewitt 75 Yd Interception Return (Gary Wunderlich Kick)
  Ole Miss 21–0

Third Quarter

- (7:05) Texas A&M – Trey Williams 3 Yd Run (Josh Lambo Kick)
  Ole Miss 21–7; 14 plays, 58 yards, 4:17
- (0:13) Ole Miss – Quincy Adeboyejo 33 Yd pass from Bo Wallace (Gary Wunderlich Kick)
  Ole Miss 28–7; 9 plays, 65 yards, 4:04

Fourth Quarter

- (14:48) Ole Miss – Keith Lewis 21 Yd Fumble Return (Gary Wunderlich Kick)
  Ole Miss 35–7
- (8:47) Texas A&M – Josh Reynolds 24 Yd pass from Kenny Hill (Josh Lambo Kick)
  Ole Miss 35–14; 7 plays, 87 yards, 1:57
- (0:00) Texas A&M – Sabian Holmes 13 Yd pass from Kenny Hill
  Ole Miss 35–20; 8 plays, 77 yards, 1:50

*The most attended football game in SEC history (home stadium only) and the most attended football game (college or professional) ever to take place in the state of Texas.

Statistics	MISS	TA&M
First downs	17	27
Total yards	338	455
Rushes/yards	35/160	35/54
Passing yards	178	401
Passing: Comp–Att–Int	13–19–0	42–53–2
Time of possession	27:20	32:40

Team	Category	Player	Statistics
Ole Miss	Passing	Bo Wallace	13/19, 178 yards, 1 TD
Ole Miss	Rushing	Bo Wallace	14 carries, 50 yards, 2 TD
Ole Miss	Receiving	Quincy Adeboyejo	2 receptions, 64 yards, 1 TD
Texas A&M	Passing	Kenny Hill	42/53, 401 yards, 2 TD, 2 INT
Texas A&M	Rushing	Tra Carson	11 carries, 29 yards
Texas A&M	Receiving	Speedy Noil	11 receptions, 105 yards

=== Tennessee ===
Uniform Combination
Helmet	Jersey	Pants

Tennessee Volunteers (3–3) at No. 3 Ole Miss Rebels (6–0)

Quarter	1	2	3	4	Total
Volunteers	0	3	0	0	3
No. 3 Rebels	0	14	10	10	34

at Vaught–Hemingway Stadium • Oxford, MS

- Date: Saturday, October 18, 2014
- Game time: 6:00 p.m. CST
- Game weather: Partly Cloudy • Temperature: 63 °F (17 °C)
- Game attendance: 62,081
- Referee: Ken Williamson
- TV announcers (ESPN):
  Brad Nessler (play-by-play)
  Todd Blackledge (color)
  Holly Rowe (sideline)

Game information

First Quarter

- No scoring plays

Second Quarter

- (12:40) Tennessee – Aaron Medley 27 Yd Field Goal
  Tennessee 3–0; 7 plays, 38 yards, 2:48
- (5:08) Ole Miss – Vince Sanders 39 Yd pass from Bo Wallace (Gary Wunderlich Kick)
  Ole Miss 7–3; 4 plays, 73 yards, 1:09
- (1:51) Ole Miss – Jaylen Walton 7 Yd Run (Gary Wunderlich Kick)
  Ole Miss 14–3; 5 plays, 35 yards, 2:10

Third Quarter

- (2:04) Ole Miss – Gary Wunderlich 34 Yd Field Goal
  Ole Miss 17–3; 5 plays, 40 yards, 1:46
- (1:50) Ole Miss – Evan Engram 28 Yd pass from Bo Wallace (Gary Wunderlich Kick)
  Ole Miss 24–3; 1 play, 28 yards, 0:14

Fourth Quarter

- (7:53) Ole Miss – Gary Wunderlich 27 Yd Field Goal
  Ole Miss 27–3; 14 plays, 61 yards, 6:52
- (0:31) Ole Miss – Mark Dodson 8 Yd Run (Gary Wunderlich Kick)
  Ole Miss 34–3; 9 plays, 55 yards, 4:41

Statistics	TENN	MISS
First downs	10	18
Total yards	191	383
Rushes/yards	28/0	47/180
Passing yards	191	203
Passing: Comp–Att–Int	19–34–3	14–31–0
Time of possession	27:04	33:04

Team	Category	Player	Statistics
Tennessee	Passing	Justin Worley	19/34, 191 yards, 3 INT
Tennessee	Rushing	Jalen Hurd	13 carries, 40 yards
Tennessee	Receiving	Josh Malone	5 receptions, 75 yards
Ole Miss	Passing	Bo Wallace	13/28, 199 yards, 2 TD
Ole Miss	Rushing	Jaylen Walton	10 carries, 60 yards, 1 TD
Ole Miss	Receiving	Vince Sanders	4 receptions, 108 yards, 1 TD

=== At No. 24 LSU ===
Uniform Combination
Helmet	Jersey	Pants

No. 3 Ole Miss Rebels (7–0) at No. 24 LSU Tigers (6–2)

Quarter	1	2	3	4	Total
No. 3 Rebels	7	0	0	0	7
No. 24 Tigers	0	3	0	7	10

at Tiger Stadium • Baton Rouge, LA

- Date: Saturday, October 25, 2014
- Game time: 6:15 p.m. CST
- Game weather: Clear Skies • Temperature: 75 °F (24 °C)
- Game attendance: 102,321
- Referee: David Smith
- TV announcers (ESPN):
  Chris Fowler (play-by-play)
  Kirk Herbstreit (color)
  Heather Cox (sideline)

Game information

First Quarter

- (0:07) Ole Miss – Cody Core 15 Yd pass from Bo Wallace (Gary Wunderlich Kick)
  Ole Miss 7–0; 6 plays, 80 yards, 1:12

Second Quarter

- (2:47) LSU – Colby Delahoussaye 21 Yd Field Goal
  Ole Miss 7–3; 17 plays, 90 yards, 9:07

Third Quarter

- No scoring plays

Fourth Quarter

- (5:07) LSU – Logan Stokes 3 Yd pass from Anthony Jennings (Colby Delahoussaye Kick)
  LSU 10–7; 13 plays, 95 yards, 5:59

Statistics	MISS	LSU
First downs	15	22
Total yards	313	406
Rushes/yards	34/137	55/264
Passing yards	176	142
Passing: Comp–Att–Int	14–34–1	8–16–2
Time of possession	24:13	35:47

Team	Category	Player	Statistics
Ole Miss	Passing	Bo Wallace	14/33, 176 yards, 1 TD, 1 INT
Ole Miss	Rushing	Bo Wallace	12 carries, 40 yards
Ole Miss	Receiving	Laquon Treadwell	4 receptions, 71 yards
LSU	Passing	Anthony Jennings	8/16, 142 yards, 1 TD, 2 INT
LSU	Rushing	Leonard Fournette	23 carries, 113 yards
LSU	Receiving	Terrence Magee	2 receptions, 45 yards

=== No. 3 Auburn ===
Uniform Combination
Helmet	Jersey	Pants

No. 3 Auburn Tigers (6–1) at No. 4 Ole Miss Rebels (7–1)

Quarter	1	2	3	4	Total
No. 3 Tigers	7	7	14	7	35
No. 4 Rebels	7	10	7	7	31

at Vaught–Hemingway Stadium • Oxford, MS

- Date: Saturday, November 1, 2014
- Game time: 6:00 p.m. CST
- Game weather: Clear Skies • Temperature: 50 °F (10 °C)
- Game attendance: 62,090
- Referee: Ken Williamson
- TV announcers (ESPN):
  Brad Nessler (play-by-play)
  Todd Blackledge (color)
  Holly Rowe (sideline)

Game information

First Quarter

- (12:04) Auburn – Nick Marshall 2 Yd Run (Daniel Carlson Kick)
  Auburn 7–0; 8 plays, 73 yards, 2:56
- (4:00) Ole Miss – I'Tavius Mathers 4 Yd Run (Gary Wunderlich Kick)
  Tied 7–7; 11 plays, 92 yards, 4:03

Second Quarter

- (6:02) Ole Miss – Laquon Treadwell 10 Yd pass from Bo Wallace (Gary Wunderlich Kick)
  Ole Miss 14–7; 2 plays, 74 yards, 0:35
- (1:24) Auburn – Sammie Coates 57 Yd pass from Nick Marshall (Daniel Carlson Kick)
  Tied 14–14; 1 play, 57 yards, 0:12
- (0:00) Ole Miss – Gary Wunderlich 47 Yd Field Goal
  Ole Miss 17–14; 7 plays, 45 yards, 1:24

Third Quarter

- (10:36) Ole Miss – Evan Engram 50 Yd pass from Bo Wallace (Gary Wunderlich Kick)
  Ole Miss 24–14; 1 play, 50 yards, 0:11
- (8:30) Auburn – Nick Marshall 2 Yd Run (Daniel Carlson Kick)
  Ole Miss 24–21; 7 plays, 73 yards, 2:06
- (1:59) Auburn – Marcus Davis 17 Yd pass from Nick Marshall (Daniel Carlson Kick)
  Auburn 28–24; 11 plays, 96 yards, 3:46

Fourth Quarter

- (14:26) Ole Miss – Bo Wallace 3 Yd Run (Gary Wunderlich Kick)
  Ole Miss 31–28; 7 plays, 75 yards, 2:33
- (10:23) Auburn – Cameron Artis-Payne 6 Yd Run (Daniel Carlson Kick)
  Auburn 35–31; 9 plays, 75 yards, 4:03

Statistics	AUB	MISS
First downs	22	24
Total yards	502	485
Rushes/yards	46/248	30/146
Passing yards	254	339
Passing: Comp–Att–Int	15–22–1	28–40–0
Time of possession	32:11	27:49

Team	Category	Player	Statistics
Auburn	Passing	Nick Marshall	15/22, 254 yards, 2 TD, 1 INT
Auburn	Rushing	Cameron Artis-Payne	27 carries, 138 yards, 1 TD
Auburn	Receiving	Sammie Coates	5 receptions, 122 yards, 1 TD
Ole Miss	Passing	Bo Wallace	28/40, 339 yards, 2 TD
Ole Miss	Rushing	Bo Wallace	14 carries, 56 yards, 1 TD
Ole Miss	Receiving	Evan Engram	8 receptions, 118 yards, 1 TD

=== Presbyterian ===
Uniform Combination
Helmet	Jersey	Pants

Presbyterian Blue Hose (5–4) at No. 11 Ole Miss Rebels (7–2)

Quarter	1	2	3	4	Total
Blue Hose	0	0	0	0	0
No. 11 Rebels	14	21	7	6	48

at Vaught–Hemingway Stadium • Oxford, MS

- Date: Saturday, November 8, 2014
- Game time: 11:00 a.m. CST
- Game weather: Sunny • Temperature: 54 °F (12 °C)
- Game attendance: 60,546
- Referee: Matt Austin
- TV announcers (SECN):
  Tom Hart (play-by-play)
  Matt Stinchcomb (color)
  Heather Mitts (sideline)

Game information

First Quarter

- (14:21) Ole Miss – Vince Sanders 66 Yd pass from Bo Wallace (Andy Pappanastos Kick)
  Ole Miss 7–0; 2 plays, 77 yards, 0:40
- (1:21) Ole Miss – Vince Sanders 23 Yd pass from Bo Wallace (Andy Pappanastos Kick)
  Ole Miss 14–0; 9 plays, 96 yards, 3:48

Second Quarter

- (10:51) Ole Miss – Mark Dodson 65 Yd Run (Andy Pappanastos Kick)
  Ole Miss 21–0; 1 play, 65 yards, 0:12
- (9:14) Ole Miss – Bo Wallace 9 Yd Run (Andy Pappanastos Kick)
  Ole Miss 28–0; 2 plays, 10 yards, 0:53
- (1:10) Ole Miss – Mark Dodson 62 Yd Run (Andy Pappanastos Kick)
  Ole Miss 35–0; 6 plays, 90 yards, 1:05

Third Quarter

- (8:23) Ole Miss – Derrick Jones 31 Yd pass from DeVante Kincade (Andrew Fletcher Kick)
  Ole Miss 42–0; 8 plays, 71 yards, 3:09

Fourth Quarter

- (10:01) Ole Miss – Jordan Wilkins 73 Yd Run (Andy Pappanastos Kick missed)
  Ole Miss 48–0; 3 plays, 80 yards, 1:16

Statistics	PRES	MISS
First downs	10	22
Total yards	156	640
Rushes/yards	36/89	36/402
Passing yards	67	238
Passing: Comp–Att–Int	10–20–1	20–30–1
Time of possession	33:33	26:27

Team	Category	Player	Statistics
Presbyterian	Passing	Heys McMath	9/17, 59 yards, 1 INT
Presbyterian	Rushing	Blake Roberts	8 carries, 49 yards
Presbyterian	Receiving	Tobi Antigha	3 receptions, 33 yards
Ole Miss	Passing	Bo Wallace	11/15, 140 yards, 2 TD, 1 INT
Ole Miss	Rushing	Jordan Wilkins	10 carries, 171 yards, 1 TD
Ole Miss	Receiving	Vince Sanders	4 receptions, 110 yards, 2 TD

=== At Arkansas ===
Uniform Combination
Helmet	Jersey	Pants

No. 8 Ole Miss Rebels (8–2) at Arkansas Razorbacks (5–5)

Quarter	1	2	3	4	Total
No. 8 Rebels	0	0	0	0	0
Razorbacks	17	0	10	3	30

at Donald W. Reynolds Razorback Stadium • Fayetteville, AR

- Date: Saturday, November 22, 2014
- Game time: 2:30 p.m. CST
- Game weather: Rain • Temperature: 52 °F (11 °C)
- Game attendance: 64,510
- Referee: Matt Loeffler
- TV announcers (CBS):
  Verne Lundquist (play-by-play)
  Gary Danielson (color)
  Allie LaForce (sideline)

Game information

First Quarter

- (12:05) Arkansas – Keon Hatcher 25 Yd pass from Brandon Allen (Adam McFain Kick)
  Arkansas 7–0; 3 plays, 52 yards, 1:12
- (7:46) Arkansas – Adam McFain 22 Yd Field Goal
  Arkansas 10–0; 9 plays, 24 yards, 3:32
- (1:09) Arkansas – Alex Collins 1 Yd Run (Adam McFain Kick)
  Arkansas 17–0; 9 plays, 49 yards, 5:15

Second Quarter

- No scoring plays

Third Quarter

- (5:43) Arkansas – Adam McFain 31 Yd Field Goal
  Arkansas 20–0; 8 plays, 41 yards, 3:28
- (3:38) Arkansas – Mark Dodson 62 Yd Run (Andy Pappanastos Kick)
  Arkansas 27–0; 6 plays, 59 yards, 2:05

Fourth Quarter

- (11:42) Arkansas – Adam McFain 18 Yd Field Goal
  Arkansas 30–0; 4 plays, 0 yards, 1:53

Statistics	MISS	ARK
First downs	19	17
Total yards	316	311
Rushes/yards	33/63	50/159
Passing yards	253	152
Passing: Comp–Att–Int	18–38–3	8–17–0
Time of possession	25:59	34:01

Team	Category	Player	Statistics
Ole Miss	Passing	Bo Wallace	16/31, 235 yards, 2 INT
Ole Miss	Rushing	Jaylen Walton	7 carries, 37 yards
Ole Miss	Receiving	Quincy Adeboyejo	6 receptions, 73 yards
Arkansas	Passing	Brandon Allen	5/10, 87 yards, 1 TD
Arkansas	Rushing	Jonathan Williams	20 carries, 81 yards
Arkansas	Receiving	Keon Hatcher	2 receptions, 58 yards, 1 TD

=== No. 4 Mississippi State ===
Uniform Combination
Helmet	Jersey	Pants

No. 4 Mississippi State Bulldogs (10–1) at No. 19 Ole Miss Rebels (8–3)

Quarter	1	2	3	4	Total
No. 4 Bulldogs	0	3	7	7	17
No. 19 Rebels	7	0	17	7	31

at Vaught–Hemingway Stadium • Oxford, MS

- Date: Saturday, November 29, 2014
- Game time: 2:30 p.m. CST
- Game weather: Cloudy • Temperature: 61 °F (16 °C)
- Game attendance: 62,058
- Referee: Tom Ritter
- TV announcers (CBS):
  Verne Lundquist (play-by-play)
  Gary Danielson (color)
  Allie LaForce (sideline)

Game information

First Quarter

- (4:00) Ole Miss – Bo Wallace 1 Yd Run (Gary Wunderlich Kick)
  Ole Miss 7–0; 2 plays, 47 yards, 0:40

Second Quarter

- (14:45) Mississippi State – Evan Sobiesk 45 Yd Field Goal
  Ole Miss 7–3; 10 plays, 47 yards, 4:15

Third Quarter

- (9:37) Mississippi State – Dak Prescott 1 Yd Run (Evan Sobiesk Kick)
  Mississippi State 10–7; 9 plays, 62 yards, 3:06
- (8:08) Ole Miss – Jeremy Liggins 1 Yd Run (Gary Wunderlich Kick)
  Ole Miss 14–10; 4 plays, 84 yards, 1:29
- (3:37) Ole Miss – Gary Wunderlich 39 Yd Field Goal
  Ole Miss 17–10; 7 plays, 58 yards, 3:06
- (2:13) Ole Miss – Jaylen Walton 91 Yd Run (Gary Wunderlich Kick)
  Ole Miss 24–10; 1 play, 91 yards, 0:26

Fourth Quarter

- (13:58) Mississippi State – De'Runnya Wilson 32 Yd pass from Dak Prescott (Evan Sobiesk Kick)
  Ole Miss 24–17; 9 plays, 75 yards, 3:15
- (9:14) Ole Miss – Cody Core 31 Yd pass from Jordan Wilkins (Gary Wunderlich Kick)
  Ole Miss 31–17; 2 plays, 72 yards, 0:31

Statistics	MSST	MISS
First downs	21	15
Total yards	445	532
Rushes/yards	47/163	31/205
Passing yards	282	327
Passing: Comp–Att–Int	22–37–0	14–31–1
Time of possession	35:45	24:15

Team	Category	Player	Statistics
Mississippi State	Passing	Dak Prescott	22/37, 282 yards, 1 TD
Mississippi State	Rushing	Ashton Shumpert	10 carries, 68 yards
Mississippi State	Receiving	De'Runnya Wilson	8 receptions, 117 yards, 1 TD
Ole Miss	Passing	Bo Wallace	13/30, 296 yards, 1 INT
Ole Miss	Rushing	Jaylen Walton	14 carries, 148 yards, 1 TD
Ole Miss	Receiving	Evan Engram	5 receptions, 176 yards

=== Vs. No. 6 TCU ===
Uniform Combination
Helmet	Jersey	Pants

No. 9 Ole Miss Rebels (9–3) vs. No. 6 TCU Horned Frogs (11–1)

Quarter	1	2	3	4	Total
No. 9 Rebels	0	0	0	3	3
No. 6 Horned Frogs	14	14	14	0	42

at Georgia Dome • Atlanta, GA

- Date: Wednesday, December 31, 2014
- Game time: 11:30 a.m. CST (12:30 p.m. local EST)
- Game weather: None (indoor stadium)
- Game attendance: 65,706
- Referee: Jerry Magallanes
- TV announcers (ESPN/ESPN Radio):
  Joe Tessitore (play-by-play)
  Brock Huard (color)
  Tim Tebow (color)
  Shannon Spake (sideline)
  Dave Neal (play-by-play)
  Andre Ware (color)
  Laura Rutledge (sideline)

Game information

First Quarter

- (14:00) TCU – Aaron Green 31 Yd pass from Kolby Listenbee (Jaden Oberkrom Kick)
  TCU 7–0; 2 plays, 35 yards, 0:37
- (6:23) TCU – Aaron Green 15 Yd Run (Jaden Oberkrom Kick)
  TCU 14–0; 15 plays, 78 yards, 5:56

Second Quarter

- (11:00) TCU – Josh Doctson 12 Yd pass from Trevone Boykin (Jaden Oberkrom Kick)
  TCU 21–0; 11 plays, 63 yards, 3:50
- (2:00) TCU – James McFarland 0 Yd Interception Return (Jaden Oberkrom Kick)
  TCU 28–0

Third Quarter

- (13:37) TCU – Kolby Listenbee 35 Yd pass from Trevone Boykin (Jaden Oberkrom Kick)
  TCU 35–0; 3 plays, 34 yards, 1:23
- (13:09) TCU – Josh Doctson 27 Yd pass from Trevone Boykin (Jaden Oberkrom Kick)
  TCU 42–0; 1 play, 27 yards, 0:08

Fourth Quarter

- (7:18) Ole Miss – Gary Wunderlich 27 Yd Field Goal
  TCU 42–3; 4 plays, 1 yard, 1:50

Statistics	MISS	TCU
First downs	10	24
Plays–yards	64–139	79–423
Rushes–yards	37–19	42–177
Passing yards	120	246
Passing: Comp–Att–Int	11–27–3	27–37–3
Time of possession	25:00	35:00

Team	Category	Player	Statistics
Ole Miss	Passing	Bo Wallace	10/23, 109 yards, 3 INT
Ole Miss	Rushing	I'Tavius Mathers	7 carries, 26 yards
Ole Miss	Receiving	Markell Pack	4 receptions, 55 yards
TCU	Passing	Trevone Boykin	22/31, 187 yards, 3 TD, 3 INT
TCU	Rushing	Aaron Green	18 carries, 68 yards, 1 TD
TCU	Receiving	Josh Doctson	6 receptions, 59 yards, 2 TD

== Cumulative Season Statistics ==
=== Cumulative Team Statistics ===
Category	Ole Miss	Opponents
First downs - Avg. per game	265 - 20.38	239 - 18.38
Points - Avg. per game	368 - 28.31	208 - 16
Total plays/yards - Avg. per game	904/5448 (6.03 yards/play) - 69.54/419.08	915/4277 (4.67 yards/play) - 70.38/329
Passing yards - Avg. per game	3427 - 263.62	2497 - 192.08
Rushes/yards (net) - Avg. per game	476/2021 - 36.62/155.46 (4.25 yards/carry)	513/1780 - 39.46/136.92 (3.47 yards/carry)
Passing (Att-Comp-Int)	428-258-15 (60.28% completion)	402-240-22 (59.7% completion)
Sacks - Avg. per game	28 - 2.15	31 - 2.38
Penalties/yards - Avg. per game	69/549 - 5.31/42.23	78/696 - 6/53.54
3rd down conversions	72/183 (39.34%)	65/197 (32.99%)
4th down conversions	9/20 (45%)	8/15 (53.33%)
Time of possession - Avg. per game	6:07:04 - 28:14	6:52:56 - 31:46

=== Cumulative Player Statistics ===
Category	Player	Statistics - Avg. per game
Leading Passer	Bo Wallace	229/381 (60.1% completion), 3194 yards, 22 TD, 14 INT - 17.62/29.31, 245.69 yards, 1.69 TD, 1.08 INT
Leading Rusher	Jaylen Walton	106 carries, 586 yards, 5 TD - 8.15 carries, 45.08 yards (5.53 yards/carry), 0.38 TD
Leading Receiver	Vince Sanders	39 receptions, 696 yards, 6 TD - 3 receptions, 53.54 yards, 0.46 TD
