= Aflac Kickoff Game =

NCAA Football event

- Stadium: Mercedes-Benz Stadium
- Location: Atlanta, Georgia
- Previous stadiums: Georgia Dome
- Operated: 2008–present

Sponsors
- Chick-Fil-A (2008–2022) Aflac (2023–present)

2026 matchup
- Auburn 17, Baylor 16

2027 matchup
- TBD vs. TBD

The Aflac Kickoff Game (known as the Chick-fil-A Kickoff Game until 2023) is an annual series of college football games played on the opening weekend of the NCAA Division I FBS season in Atlanta, Georgia. Organized by the Peach Bowl, the event coincides with Labor Day weekend in the United States. From its inception in 2008 until 2016, it was held at the Georgia Dome. The Georgia Dome's replacement, Mercedes-Benz Stadium, began hosting the games starting in 2017. Since 2012, there have been occasional doubleheaders in the series.

== History ==
Organizers intended for the game to become a national spotlight game, on par with the Kickoff Classic held in the Meadowlands from 1983 to 2002, and the Disneyland Pigskin Classic in the 1990s. In 2008, ESPN's College Gameday broadcast from Downtown Atlanta, while ESPN corporate sponsors and local Atlanta-based companies featured prominent displays at Fanzones in Atlanta's Centennial Olympic Park.

Payout to each team depends on the amount of revenue gained in excess of the Kickoff's $5.5 million budget. In 2008, Clemson and Alabama were both expected to receive more than $2 million.

In 2017, the game permanently moved from the Georgia Dome to Mercedes-Benz Stadium.

Starting on July 12, 2023, Aflac will became the game’s new sponsor, replacing Chick-Fil-A.

=== Series summary ===
The first game, known that year as the Chick-fil-A College Kickoff, was played on August 30, 2008, the opening Saturday of the 2008 season. Alabama defeated Clemson 34–10.

Alabama returned to the Chick-fil-A Kickoff for the 2009 game, defeating Virginia Tech to begin the 2009 season.

Auburn and UCLA were initially slated to play in 2010, but Auburn officials later backed out of the offer. ABC attempted to replace Auburn with Georgia Tech, but the switch prompted UCLA to opt out entirely because the game would essentially be a home game for the Atlanta-based Yellow Jackets, with no scheduled return trip to Los Angeles. Finally, an agreement was reached in which LSU and North Carolina would match up, with the Tigers winning 30–24. The 2010 game also saw the introduction of a trophy awarded to the winner, the Old Leather Helmet.

The 2011 edition was the first Chick-fil-A Kickoff to feature a team that was not a member of the ACC or SEC, the two conferences with tie-ins to the Peach Bowl. Boise State of the Mountain West Conference, one of the most successful programs from a BCS non-automatic qualifier conference in recent years, defeated Georgia 35–21.

The Chick-fil-A Kickoff consisted of two games in 2012. Tennessee defeated NC State 35–21 on Friday night prior to Clemson defeating Auburn 26–19 in the headliner on Saturday. The dual-game idea was first mentioned in the Miami Herald in May 2010, when Gary Stokan, president of the Chick-Fil-A Bowl, told the newspaper that there was the possibility of having Alabama face Miami in a rematch of the 1993 Sugar Bowl.

The 2013 edition was a rematch of the 2009 game. Alabama, the two-time defending BCS national champions, once again defeated Virginia Tech, this time by a score of 35–10.

2014 would again feature two games. Ole Miss defeated Boise State 35–13 in a Thursday night game. Alabama would defeat West Virginia 33–23 in the headliner on Saturday afternoon. It marked the first ever meeting between Alabama and West Virginia in any sport.

The 2015 Chick-fil-A Kickoff Game, which moved to CBS that season, returned to a single game with the ACC's Louisville Cardinals taking on the SEC's Auburn Tigers. Auburn defeated Louisville, 31–24.

The 2016 Chick-fil-A Kickoff Game, which moved back to ESPN, featured North Carolina and Georgia, both making their second appearances in the kickoff series. The Bulldogs defeated the Tar Heels 33–24 in the final edition of the game played the Georgia Dome.

The 2017 event was the third doubleheader in the series. Alabama defeated Florida State on Saturday evening by a score of 24–7, serving as the Saturday Night Football season opener. Tennessee defeated Georgia Tech 42–41 in double overtime on Monday evening. The two games were the first in the series to be played in the new Mercedes-Benz Stadium in Downtown Atlanta.

For the first time, the 2020 event was intended to include three games across two consecutive weeks, with a week 1 doubleheader between Florida State and West Virginia, followed by Georgia and Virginia. Auburn and North Carolina were to also play a week 2 game as part of the series. On July 29, 2020, all three games were cancelled due to the COVID-19 pandemic, as the ACC announced that it was restricting all teams to one non-conference game played in the team's home state only, and the SEC cancelled all non-conference play entirely.

== Game results ==
Season	Date	Winning team		Losing team		Attendance
2008	August 30, 2008	24 Alabama Crimson Tide	34	9 Clemson Tigers	10	70,097
2009	September 5, 2009	5 Alabama Crimson Tide	34	7 Virginia Tech Hokies	24	74,954
2010	September 4, 2010	21 LSU Tigers	30	18 North Carolina Tar Heels	24	68,919
2011	September 3, 2011	5 Boise State Broncos	35	19 Georgia Bulldogs	21	73,614
2012	August 31, 2012	Tennessee Volunteers	35	NC State Wolfpack	21	55,529
2012	September 1, 2012	14 Clemson Tigers	26	Auburn Tigers	19	75,211
2013	August 31, 2013	1 Alabama Crimson Tide	35	Virginia Tech Hokies	10	73,114
2014	August 28, 2014	18 Ole Miss Rebels	35	Boise State Broncos	13	32,823
2014	August 30, 2014	2 Alabama Crimson Tide	33	West Virginia Mountaineers	23	70,502
2015	September 5, 2015	6 Auburn Tigers	31	Louisville Cardinals	24	73,927
2016	September 3, 2016	18 Georgia Bulldogs	33	22 North Carolina Tar Heels	24	75,405
2017	September 2, 2017	1 Alabama Crimson Tide	24	3 Florida State Seminoles	7	76,330
2017	September 4, 2017	25 Tennessee Volunteers	42	Georgia Tech Yellow Jackets	41 ^{2OT}	75,107
2018	September 1, 2018	9 Auburn Tigers	21	6 Washington Huskies	16	70,103
2019	August 31, 2019	2 Alabama Crimson Tide	42	Duke Blue Devils	3	71,916
2020	Games cancelled due to the COVID-19 pandemic. Originally North Carolina vs Auburn and Georgia vs Virginia					
2021	September 4, 2021	1 Alabama Crimson Tide	44	14 Miami Hurricanes	13	71,829
2021	September 6, 2021	Ole Miss Rebels	43	Louisville Cardinals	24	30,709
2022	September 3, 2022	3 Georgia Bulldogs	49	11 Oregon Ducks	3	76,490
2022	September 5, 2022	4 Clemson Tigers	41	Georgia Tech Yellow Jackets	10	47,712
2023	September 1, 2023	Louisville Cardinals	39	Georgia Tech Yellow Jackets	34	36,101
2024	August 31, 2024	1 Georgia Bulldogs	34	14 Clemson Tigers	3	78,827
2025	August 30, 2025	24 Tennessee Volunteers	45	Syracuse Orange	26	45,918
2025	August 31, 2025	13 South Carolina Gamecocks	24	Virginia Tech Hokies	11	55,531
2026	September 5, 2026	Auburn Tigers	17	Baylor Bears	16	55,068

Rankings are from the AP Poll.

== Future games ==
Season	Date	Matchup	
2027	TBD	TBD	TBD

== Records ==
=== By team ===
Rank	Team	Apps	Record	Win%
1	Alabama	7	7–0	1.000
2	Tennessee	3	3–0	1.000
3	Ole Miss	2	2–0	1.000
4	LSU	1	1–0	1.000
4	South Carolina	1	1–0	1.000
6	Auburn	4	3–1	.750
6	Georgia	4	3–1	.750
8	Clemson	4	2–2	.500
9	Boise State	2	1–1	.500
10	Louisville	3	1–2	.333
11	Baylor	1	0–1	.000
11	Duke	1	0–1	.000
11	Florida State	1	0–1	.000
11	Miami (FL)	1	0–1	.000
11	NC State	1	0–1	.000
11	Oregon	1	0–1	.000
11	Washington	1	0–1	.000
11	West Virginia	1	0–1	.000
11	Syracuse	1	0–1	.000
19	North Carolina	2	0–2	.000
20	Georgia Tech	3	0–3	.000
20	Virginia Tech	3	0–3	.000

=== By conference ===
Rank	Conference	Apps	Record	Win%
1	SEC	22	20–2	.909
2	ACC	20	3–17	.150
3	Mountain West	2	1–1	.500
4	Pac-12	3	0–3	.000
4	Big 12	2	0–2	.000
