= 2014 Kansas Jayhawks football team =

American college football season

2014 Kansas Jayhawks football
- Conference: Big 12 Conference
- Record: 3–9 (1–8 Big 12)
- Head coach: Charlie Weis (3rd season; first 4 games); Clint Bowen (interim, final 8 games)
- Offensive coordinator: John Reagan (1st season; first 7 games) (1st season)
- Co-offensive coordinator: Eric Kiesau (interim; remainder of season)
- Offensive scheme: Spread
- Defensive coordinator: Dave Campo (3rd season)
- Base defense: Multiple
- Home stadium: Memorial Stadium

2014 Big 12 Conference football standings
	Conf.			Overall
Team	W		L	W		L
No. 7 Baylor +	8	–	1	11	–	2
No. 3 TCU +	8	–	1	12	–	1
No. 18 Kansas State	7	–	2	9	–	4
Oklahoma	5	–	4	8	–	5
West Virginia	5	–	4	7	–	6
Texas	5	–	4	6	–	7
Oklahoma State	4	–	5	7	–	6
Texas Tech	2	–	7	4	–	8
Kansas	1	–	8	3	–	9
Iowa State	0	–	9	2	–	10
+ – Conference co-champions; Rankings from AP Poll

The 2014 Kansas Jayhawks football team represented the University of Kansas as a member of the Big 12 Conference during the 2014 NCAA Division I FBS football season. The Jayhawks were led by third-year head coach Charlie Weis for the first four games of the season and interim head coach Clint Bowen for final eight games. The team played their home games at Memorial Stadium. They finished the season with an overall record of 3–9 and mark of 1–8 in conference play, placing ninth place in the Big 12.

On September 28, after starting the year 2–2 and going only 6–22 in two-plus seasons, head coach Charlie Weis was fired. Linebackers coach Clint Bowen was named interim head coach for the remainder of the season.

== Schedule ==
Date	Time	Opponent	Site	TV	Result	Attendance
September 6	6:00 p.m.	Southeast Missouri State*	Memorial Stadium; Lawrence, KS	JTV	W 34–28	36,574
September 13	2:30 p.m.	at Duke*	Wallace Wade Stadium; Durham, NC	ACCRSN	L 3–41	25,203
September 20	2:30 p.m.	Central Michigan*	Memorial Stadium; Lawrence, KS	FSN	W 24–10	34,822
September 27	3:00 p.m.	Texas^{†}	Memorial Stadium; Lawrence, KS	FS1	L 0–23	36,904
October 4	3:00 p.m.	at West Virginia	Mountaineer Field; Morgantown, WV	FSN	L 14–33	52,164
October 11	3:00 p.m.	No. 16 Oklahoma State	Memorial Stadium; Lawrence, KS	FS1	L 20–27	31,985
October 18	2:30 p.m.	at Texas Tech	Jones AT&T Stadium; Lubbock, TX	FSN	L 21–34	54,071
November 1	3:00 p.m.	at No. 12 Baylor	McLane Stadium; Waco, TX	FS1	L 14–60	47,574
November 8	2:30 p.m.	Iowa State	Memorial Stadium; Lawrence, KS	FSN	W 34–14	33,288
November 15	2:00 p.m.	No. 5 TCU	Memorial Stadium; Lawrence, KS	FS1	L 30–34	30,889
November 22	11:00 a.m.	at No. 23 Oklahoma	Gaylord Family Oklahoma Memorial Stadium; Norman, OK	FS1	L 7–44	84,908
November 29	3:00 p.m.	at No. 11 Kansas State	Bill Snyder Family Football Stadium; Manhattan, KS (rivalry)	FS1	L 13–51	53,439
*Non-conference game; ^{†}Homecoming; Rankings from AP Poll released prior to the game; All times are in Central time

== Coaching staff ==
Name	Position
Charlie Weis	Head coach (games 1–4)
Clint Bowen	Interim head coach (games 5–12), linebackers coach
Dave Campo	Assistant head coach-defense, defensive backs coach
John Reagan	Offensive coordinator, offensive line coach
Reggie Mitchell	Running backs coach, recruiting coordinator
Ron Powlus	Quarterbacks coach
Jeff Blasko	Tight ends coach
Buddy Wyatt	Defensive line coach
Scott Vestal	Assistant defensive backs coach
Eric Kiesau	Wide receivers coach

== Roster ==
2014 Kansas Jayhawks football roster
(Starters in bold)
**Quarterbacks**: 2 **Montell Cozart** – So.; 10 T.J. Millweard – (redshirt) So.; 14 Michael Cummings – (redshirt) Jr.; 16 Jordan Darling – (redshirt) Fr.; **Running backs**: 6 Corey Avery – Fr.; 23 **De'Andre Mann** – Jr.; 25 Brandon Bourbon – (redshirt) Sr.; 29 Joe Dineen – Fr.; 34 Aaron Plump – Jr.; 36 Taylor Cox - (redshirt) Sr.; 40 Preston Randall – (redshirt) So.; **Fullbacks**: 43 Ed Fink – (redshirt) Sr.; **Wide receivers**: 1 Rodriguez Coleman – (redshirt) Jr.; 3 **Tony Pierson** – Sr.; 4 Tyler Patrick – Fr.; 5 Bobby Hartzog – Fr.; 7 Derrick Neal – Fr.; 8 **Nick Harwell** – (redshirt) Sr.; 9 Nigel King – Jr.; 11 Tre' Parmalee – Jr.; 12 Darious Crawley – Fr.; 15 Seth Conway – Jr.; 19 **Justin McCay** – (redshirt) Sr.; 80 Matt Hentges – (redshirt) So.; 82 Shakiem Barbiel – Jr.; **Tight ends**: 41 **Jimmay Mundine** – (redshirt) Sr.; 44 Scott Baron – (redshirt) Jr.; 81 Kent Taylor – (redshirt) (TR); 84 Ben Johnson – (redshirt) Fr.; 85 Trent Smiley – (redshirt) Sr.; 86 Andrew Zimmer – Fr.	**Offensive line**: 55 Jacob Bragg – Fr.; 61 **Pat Lewandowski** – (redshirt) Sr.; 63 **Ngalu Fusimalohi** – Sr.; 65 **Mike Smithburg** – Sr.; 67 Joey Bloomfield – (redshirt) Fr.; 70 **Keyon Haughton** – Jr.; 71 Devon Williams – Jr.; 73 **Damon Martin** – (redshirt) Jr.; 74 Brian Beckmann – (redshirt) So.; 75 Apa Visinia – Fr.; 76 Bryan Peters – (redshirt) Jr.; 77 Joe Gibson – (redshirt) Fr.; 78 Larry Mazcyk – Jr.; 79 Jordan Shelley-Smith – (redshirt) So.; **Defensive line**: 13 Damani Mosby – Jr.; 35 T.J. Semke – (redshirt) Jr.; 56 Anthony Olobia - Jr.; 64 Kyle Pullia – So.; 90 Kapil Fletcher – Jr.; 91 D.J. Williams – Fr.; 92 Lay'Trion Jones – Fr.; 93 **Ben Goodman** – (redshirt) Jr.; 94 Tyler Holmes – (redshirt) So.; 95 **Andrew Bolton** – (redshirt) Jr.; 96 Daniel Wise – Fr.; 98 **Keon Stowers** – Sr.; 99 Tedarian Johnson – Sr.	**Linebackers**: 6 Kyron Watson – Fr.; 17 Josh Ehambe – Fr.; 27 Victor Simmons – Sr.; 28 Courtney Arnick – (redshirt) So.; 31 **Ben Heeney** – Sr.; 32 Schyler Miles – Jr.; 37 Beau Bell – Jr.; 44 Mike Zunica – (redshirt) So.; 46 Kellen Ash – (redshirt) Fr.; 53 Colton Goeas – (redshirt) Fr.; 55 **Michael Reynolds** – Sr.; 57 **Jake Love** – (redshirt) Jr.; 59 Cameron Rosser – (redshirt) So.; **Cornerbacks**: 1 Matthew Boateng – Fr.; 7 Kevin Short – (redshirt) Jr.; 12 **Dexter McDonald** – Sr.; 22 Greg Allen – (redshirt) So.; 23 Ronnie Davis – Jr.; 24 **JaCorey Shepherd** – Sr.; 26 Colin Spencer – (redshirt) Fr.; 36 Chevy Graham – So.; 39 Michael Glatczak – Jr.; **Safeties**: 5 **Isaiah Johnson** – Jr.; 9 Anthony Smithson – So.; 30 Tevin Shaw – (redshirt) So.; 33 **Cassius Sendish** – Sr.; 38 Jaccare Givens – Sr.; 43 Alex Matlock – (redshirt) Jr.; **Special teams**: 13 John Duvic – Fr. (K); 14 Andrew Yoxall – So. (P); 16 **Trevor Pardula** – Sr. (P/K); 17 **Matthew Wyman** – Jr. (K); 18 Eric Kahn – (redshirt) Jr. (K); 19 Austin Barone – (redshirt) So. (K); 52 Reese Randall – Fr. (LS); 60 Reilly Jeffers – Jr. (LS); 64 Jordan Goldenberg – So. (LS); 68 **John Wirtel** – So. (LS)
