= 2014 Peach Bowl =

2014 Chick-fil-A Peach Bowl
- CFP New Year’s Six; 47th Peach Bowl
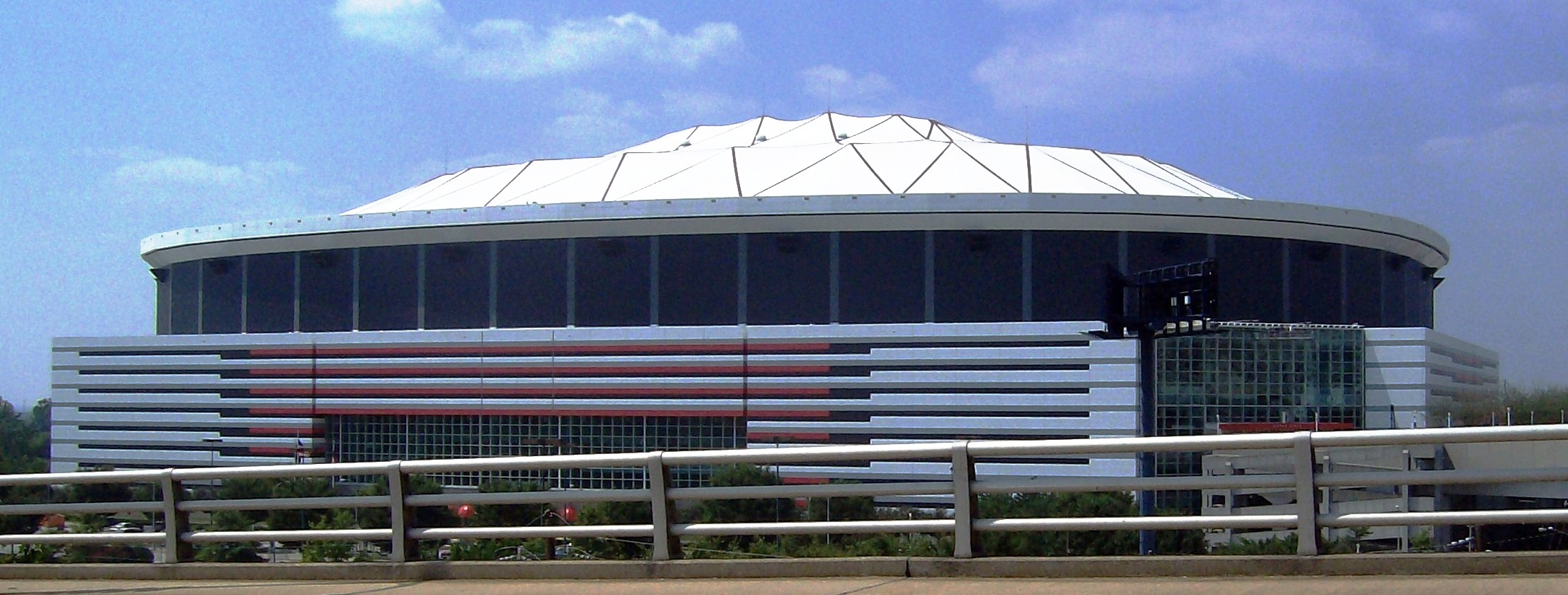
- The Georgia Dome in Atlanta, Georgia, hosted the Peach Bowl.
| Ole Miss Rebels | TCU Horned Frogs |
| (9–3) | (11–1) |
| SEC | Big 12 |
| 3 | 42 |
| Head coach: Hugh Freeze | Head coach: Gary Patterson |
| AP / Coaches / CFP; 9 / 12 / 9 | AP / Coaches / CFP; 6 / 6 / 6 |
| | 1 | 2 | 3 | 4 | Total |
|---|---|---|---|---|---|
| Ole Miss | 0 | 0 | 0 | 3 | 3 |
| TCU | 14 | 14 | 14 | 0 | 42 |
- Date: December 31, 2014
- Season: 2014
- Stadium: Georgia Dome
- Location: Atlanta, Georgia
- MVP: Offensive: TCU QB Trevone Boykin; Defensive: TCU DE James McFarland
- Favorite: TCU by 4
- Referee: Jerry Magallanes (ACC)
- Attendance: 65,706
- Payout: US$4,000,000 (to each conference)

United States TV coverage
- Network: ESPN/ESPN Radio
- Announcers: Joe Tessitore (play-by-play); Brock Huard (analyst); Tim Tebow (analyst); Shannon Spake (sideline reporter)/Dave Neal(play-by-play); Andre Ware(analyst); Laura Rutledge(sideline reporter)

The 2014 Peach Bowl was a college football bowl game that was played on December 31, 2014, at the Georgia Dome in Atlanta, Georgia. The 47th Peach Bowl was one of the "New Year's Six" bowl games in the College Football Playoff. It was one of the 2014–15 bowl games that concluded the 2014 FBS football season. The game started at 12:30 p.m.. It was televised on ESPN and ESPN Deportes, and broadcast on ESPN Radio and XM Satellite Radio.

The 2014 Peach Bowl featured the Ole Miss Rebels of the Southeastern Conference against the TCU Horned Frogs of the Big 12 Conference. TCU defeated Ole Miss by a score of 42–3.

Sponsored by the Chick-fil-A restaurant franchise, the game was officially known as the Chick-fil-A Peach Bowl. This was the first time since 2005 that the game was called the Peach Bowl. Between 2006 and 2013 it was known as the Chick-fil-A Bowl.

== Teams ==
The College Football Playoff Selection Committee selected #9 Ole Miss Rebels and the #6 TCU Horned Frogs to participate in the game. Ole Miss was an at-large team, finishing in 3rd place in the SEC West, while TCU was the Big 12 Conference co-champions.

This was the seventh overall meeting between these two teams, with Ole Miss previously leading the series 5–1. The last time these two teams met was in 1983. These two teams have played each other in two bowl games previously, the 1948 Delta Bowl and the 1956 Cotton Bowl.

The Peach Bowl had long been one of the most prestigious non-major bowls. Its inclusion in the College Football Playoff marked its ascendance to major-bowl status.

== Game summary ==
=== Scoring summary ===
Scoring summary

| Quarter | Time | Drive | | | Team | Scoring information | Score | |
| Quarter | Time | Plays | Yards | TOP | Team | Scoring information | MISS | TCU |
|---|---|---|---|---|---|---|---|---|
| 1 | 14:00 | 2 | 35 | 0:37 | TCU | Aaron Green 31-yard touchdown reception from Kolby Listenbee, Jaden Oberkrom kick good | 0 | 7 |
| 1 | 6:23 | 15 | 78 | 5:56 | TCU | Aaron Green 15-yard touchdown run, Jaden Oberkrom kick good | 0 | 14 |
| 2 | 11:00 | 11 | 63 | 3:50 | TCU | Josh Doctson 12-yard touchdown reception from Trevone Boykin, Jaden Oberkrom kick good | 0 | 21 |
| 2 | 2:00 | – | – | – | TCU | Interception returned 0 yards for touchdown by James McFarland, Jaden Oberkrom kick good | 0 | 28 |
| 3 | 13:37 | 3 | 34 | 1:23 | TCU | Kolby Listenbee 35-yard touchdown reception from Trevone Boykin, Jaden Oberkrom kick good | 0 | 35 |
| 3 | 13:09 | 1 | 27 | 0:08 | TCU | Josh Doctson 27-yard touchdown reception from Trevone Boykin, Jaden Oberkrom kick good | 0 | 42 |
| 4 | 7:18 | 4 | 1 | 1:50 | MISS | 27-yard field goal by Gary Wunderlich | 3 | 42 |
| "TOP" = time of possession. For other American football terms, see Glossary of American football. | | | | | | | 3 | 42 |

=== Statistics ===
| Statistics | MISS | TCU |
|---|---|---|
| First downs | 10 | 24 |
| Plays–yards | 64–139 | 79–423 |
| Rushes–yards | 37–19 | 42–177 |
| Passing yards | 120 | 246 |
| Passing: Comp–Att–Int | 11–27–3 | 27–37–3 |
| Time of possession | 25:00 | 35:00 |
