= 2014 TCU Horned Frogs football team =

American college football season

2014 TCU Horned Frogs football

Peach Bowl champion

Peach Bowl, W 42–3 vs. Ole Miss
- Conference: Big 12 Conference

Ranking
- Coaches: No. 3
- AP: No. 3
- Record: 12–1 (8–1 Big 12)
- Head coach: Gary Patterson (14th season)
- Co-offensive coordinators: Doug Meacham (1st season); Sonny Cumbie (1st season)
- Offensive scheme: Spread
- Defensive coordinator: Dick Bumpas (11th season)
- Base defense: 4–2–5 defense
- Home stadium: Amon G. Carter Stadium

2014 Big 12 Conference football standings
	Conf.				Overall
Team	W		L		W		L
No. 7 Baylor +	8	–	1		11	–	2
No. 3 TCU	–	8	–	1	12	–	1
No. 18 Kansas State	7	–	2		9	–	4
Oklahoma	5	–	4		8	–	5
West Virginia	5	–	4		7	–	6
Texas	5	–	4		6	–	7
Oklahoma State	4	–	5		7	–	6
Texas Tech	2	–	7		4	–	8
Kansas	1	–	8		3	–	9
Iowa State	0	–	9		2	–	10
Rankings from AP Poll

The 2014 TCU Horned Frogs football team represented Texas Christian University (TCU) in the 2014 NCAA Division I FBS football season. Playing as a member of the Big 12 Conference (Big 12), the team was led by head coach Gary Patterson, in his 14th year, and played its home games at Amon G. Carter Stadium in Fort Worth, Texas. They finished the season 12–1, 8–1 in Big 12 play to finish as co-champions with Baylor. They were invited to the Peach Bowl where they defeated Ole Miss. TCU finished sixth in the final College Football Playoff rankings and was not selected for the four-team playoff.

== Playoff selection controversy ==
Entering its final regular season game, TCU was ranked third in the College Football Playoff ranking. The Horned Frogs defeated Iowa State 55-3 and finished 8-1 in Big 12 play, earning a share of the Big 12 championship with Baylor. Baylor also finished 8-1 in the conference and defeated TCU 61-58 in their matchup in October.

TCU fell sixth in the selection committee's final rankings, despite the win over Iowa State. Baylor finished fifth in the playoff final rankings, while Ohio State received the fourth and final spot in the inaugural College Football Playoff. Ohio State's selection came after its 59-0 win over Wisconsin in the Big Ten championship game. Each of the four teams selected for the playoff had won a conference championship game.

The Big 12 named TCU and Baylor co-champions after both teams finished 8-1 in conference games. In their head-to-head matchup, Baylor had defeated TCU 61-58. The selection caused discussion about the Big 12's championship format. Unlike the conferences selected for the playoff, the Big 12 did not hold a championship game. Big 12 commissioner Bob Bowlsby argued that the conference's lack of a championship game hurt its teams' playoff chances. TCU coach Gary Patterson said he would support a conference championship game if it improved the opportunity for Big 12 teams to qualify for the playoff.

== Coaching staff ==
Name	Position	Year at TCU	Alma mater
Gary Patterson	Head coach	14th	Kansas State (1983)
Jarrett Anderson	Offensive line	17th	New Mexico (1993)
Dick Bumpas	Defensive coordinator/defensive line	11th	Arkansas (1973)
Rusty Burns	Outside receivers	6th	Springfield College (1978)
DeMontie Cross	Linebackers	2nd	Missouri (1997)
Sonny Cumbie	Co-Offensive Coordinator/quarterbacks	1st	Texas Tech (2004)
Chad Glasgow	Safeties	13th	Oklahoma State (1995)
Curtis Luper	Running backs	2nd	Stephen F. Austin (1996)
Doug Meacham	Co-Offensive Coordinator/Inside Wide Receivers	1st	Oklahoma State (1988)
Kenny Perry	Cornerbacks	2nd	Houston (1993)
Dan Sharp	Special teams	14th	TCU (1985)
Bryson Oliver	Graduate Assistant – Offense	1st	Texas Tech (2006)
Jason Teague	Graduate Assistant – Defense	2nd	TCU (2010)

== Schedule ==
Date	Time	Opponent	Rank	Site	TV	Result	Attendance
August 30	6:00 p.m.	Samford*		Amon G. Carter Stadium; Fort Worth, TX	FSSW/FCS Central	W 48–14	40,094
September 13	3:00 p.m.	Minnesota*		Amon G. Carter Stadium; Fort Worth, TX	FS1	W 30–7	43,958
September 27	11:00 a.m.	at SMU*		Gerald J. Ford Stadium; University Park, TX (Battle for the Iron Skillet)	CBSSN	W 56–0	23,093
October 4	2:30 p.m.	No. 4 Oklahoma	No. 25	Amon G. Carter Stadium; Fort Worth, TX	FOX	W 37–33	47,394
October 11	2:30 p.m.	at No. 5 Baylor	No. 9	McLane Stadium; Waco, TX (rivalry)	ABC/ESPN2	L 58–61	46,803
October 18	3:00 p.m.	No. 15 Oklahoma State^{†}	No. 12	Amon G. Carter Stadium; Fort Worth, TX	FS1	W 42–9	43,214
October 25	2:30 p.m.	Texas Tech	No. 10	Amon G. Carter Stadium; Fort Worth, TX (The West Texas Championship)	FOX	W 82–27	45,122
November 1	2:30 p.m.	at No. 20 West Virginia	No. 7	Mountaineer Field; Morgantown, WV (College GameDay)	ABC/ESPN2	W 31–30	61,190
November 8	6:30 p.m.	No. 7 Kansas State	No. 6	Amon G. Carter Stadium; Fort Worth, TX	FOX	W 41–20	48,012
November 15	2:30 p.m.	at Kansas	No. 4	Memorial Stadium; Lawrence, KS	FS1	W 34–30	30,889
November 27	6:30 p.m.	at Texas	No. 5	Darrell K Royal–Texas Memorial Stadium; Austin, TX (rivalry)	FS1	W 48–10	96,496
December 6	11:00 a.m.	Iowa State	No. 3	Amon G. Carter Stadium; Fort Worth, TX	ABC	W 55–3	45,242
December 31	11:30 a.m.	vs. No. 9 Ole Miss*	No. 6	Georgia Dome; Atlanta, GA (Peach Bowl)	ESPN	W 42–3	65,706
*Non-conference game; ^{†}Homecoming; Rankings from AP Poll and College Football Playoff Top 25 poll (beginning 11/1) released prior to game; All times are in Central time

Schedule source:

== Game summaries ==
=== Samford ===
	1	2	3	4	Total
Bulldogs	0	7	0	7	14
Horned Frogs	14	10	10	14	48

=== Minnesota ===
	1	2	3	4	Total
Golden Gophers	0	0	0	7	7
Horned Frogs	10	14	6	0	30

=== @ SMU ===
	1	2	3	4	Total
Horned Frogs	7	21	21	7	56
Mustangs	0	0	0	0	0

=== Oklahoma ===
	1	2	3	4	Total
#4 Sooners	14	10	7	2	33
#25 Horned Frogs	14	10	7	6	37

=== @ Baylor ===
	1	2	3	4	Total
#9 Horned Frogs	14	17	13	14	58
#5 Bears	10	17	10	24	61

TCU's only loss of the season occurred on October 11, 2014, falling to Baylor 61-58 at McLane Stadium in Waco, Texas. At halftime, the Horned Frogs led 31-27. With 11:38 remaining in the fourth quarter, TCU extended its lead with a 49-yard interception return for a touchdown by linebacker Marcus Mallet, putting them up 58-37. Baylor responded by scoring three consecutive touchdowns to tie the game. After TCU's offense failed to convert a fourth down, Baylor drove into field goal range, and Chris Callahan kicked a 28-yard field goal as time expired to give Baylor the victory.

=== Oklahoma State ===
	1	2	3	4	Total
#15 Cowboys	3	6	0	0	9
#12 Horned Frogs	21	7	14	0	42

=== Texas Tech ===
	1	2	3	4	Total
Red Raiders	17	3	7	0	27
#10 Horned Frogs	24	13	31	14	82

=== @ West Virginia ===
	1	2	3	4	Total
#7 Horned Frogs	7	0	14	10	31
#20 Mountaineers	13	0	14	3	30

=== Kansas State ===
	1	2	3	4	Total
#7 Wildcats	7	0	7	6	20
#6 Horned Frogs	14	3	14	10	41

=== @ Kansas ===
	1	2	3	4	Total
#4 Horned Frogs	7	3	21	3	34
Jayhawks	6	7	14	3	30

=== @ Texas ===
	1	2	3	4	Total
#5 Horned Frogs	13	7	0	28	48
Longhorns	0	3	0	7	10

=== Iowa State ===
	1	2	3	4	Total
Cyclones	0	3	0	0	3
#3 Horned Frogs	14	3	31	7	55

=== Ole Miss –Peach Bowl ===
	1	2	3	4	Total
#6 Horned Frogs	14	14	14	0	42
#9 Rebels	0	0	0	3	3

On December 31, 2014, TCU finished its season after defeating Ole Miss 42-3 in the Peach Bowl at the Georgia Dome in Atlanta. The first score came early in the first quarter with a 31-yard touchdown pass from TCU's Kolby Listenbee to Aaron Green. Green also scored on a 15-yard run, giving him both a receiving and rushing touchdown in the same quarter. At halftime, the Horned Frogs led 28-0, then added two third-quarter touchdowns. Quarterback Trevone Boykin finished with three touchdown passes. The TCU defense held Ole Miss to 129 total yards of offense. The Horned Frogs also limited the Rebels to nine total rushing yards. Ole Miss quarterback Bo Wallace threw three interceptions and was sacked five times in his final college game. The Ole Miss Rebels avoided a shutout, scoring zero points until Gary Wunderlich kicked a late-game 27-yard field goal. This game left TCU with a final record of 12-1. TCU set a record for the largest margin of victory in a Peach Bowl game.

== Rankings ==
Ranking movements Legend: ██ Increase in ranking ██ Decrease in ranking RV = Received votes ( ) = First-place votes
	Week																
Poll	Pre	1	2	3	4	5	6	7	8	9	10	11	12	13	14	15	Final
AP	RV	RV	RV	RV	RV	25	9	12	10	10	6	5	5	6	4	6	3
Coaches	RV	RV	RV	RV	RV	25	12	12	10	10	7	5	5	5	4	6 (1)	3
CFP	Not released									7	6	4	5	5	3	6	Not released
