= 2014 Texas Longhorns football team =

American college football season

2014 Texas Longhorns football

Texas Bowl, L 7–31 vs. Arkansas
- Conference: Big 12 Conference
- Record: 6–7 (5–4 Big 12)
- Head coach: Charlie Strong (1st season)
- Offensive coordinator: Joe Wickline (1st season)
- Offensive scheme: Multiple
- Defensive coordinator: Vance Bedford (1st season)
- Base defense: 3–3–5
- Home stadium: Darrell K Royal–Texas Memorial Stadium

2014 Big 12 Conference football standings
	Conf.			Overall
Team	W		L	W		L
No. 7 Baylor +	8	–	1	11	–	2
No. 3 TCU +	8	–	1	12	–	1
No. 18 Kansas State	7	–	2	9	–	4
Oklahoma	5	–	4	8	–	5
West Virginia	5	–	4	7	–	6
Texas	5	–	4	6	–	7
Oklahoma State	4	–	5	7	–	6
Texas Tech	2	–	7	4	–	8
Kansas	1	–	8	3	–	9
Iowa State	0	–	9	2	–	10
+ – Conference co-champions; Rankings from AP Poll

The 2014 Texas Longhorns football team (variously "Texas," "UT," the "Longhorns," or the "Horns") was an American football team that represented the University of Texas at Austin as a member of the Big 12 Conference in the 2014 NCAA Division I FBS football season. Texas was led by first-year head coach Charlie Strong. The team played their home games at Darrell K Royal–Texas Memorial Stadium in Austin, Texas. They finished the season 6–7, 5–4 in Big 12 play to finish in a three way tie for fourth place. They were invited to the Texas Bowl where they lost to Arkansas.

== Schedule ==
In 2014, Texas played three non-conference games and nine games against teams from the Big 12 during the regular season. Of these twelve games, six will be played at home, four will be away games, and two will be played at neutral sites, including the Red River Showdown against Oklahoma, which is traditionally and annually played at the Cotton Bowl in Dallas, Texas. The other game to be played at a neutral site is against UCLA, which took place at the AT&T Stadium in Arlington, Texas on September 13. Two of Texas' games were broadcast on the university's Longhorn Network – games against North Texas and Iowa State.

Date	Time	Opponent	Site	TV	Result	Attendance
August 30	7:00 p.m.	North Texas*	Darrell K Royal–Texas Memorial Stadium; Austin, TX	LHN	W 38–7	93,201
September 6	6:30 p.m.	BYU*	Darrell K Royal–Texas Memorial Stadium; Austin, TX	FS1	L 7–41	93,463
September 13	7:00 p.m.	vs. No. 12 UCLA*	AT&T Stadium; Arlington, TX (Advocare Cowboys Showdown)	FOX	L 17–20	60,479
September 27	3:00 p.m.	at Kansas	Memorial Stadium; Lawrence, KS	FS1	W 23–0	36,904
October 4	2:30 p.m.	No. 7 Baylor	Darrell K Royal–Texas Memorial Stadium; Austin, TX (rivalry)	ABC	L 7–28	93,727
October 11	11:00 a.m.	vs. No. 11 Oklahoma	Cotton Bowl; Dallas, TX (Red River Rivalry)	ABC	L 26–31	92,100
October 18	7:00 p.m.	Iowa State	Darrell K Royal–Texas Memorial Stadium; Austin, TX	LHN	W 48–45	92,017
October 25	11:00 a.m.	at No. 11 Kansas State	Bill Snyder Family Football Stadium; Manhattan, KS	ESPN	L 0–23	52,879
November 1	6:30 p.m.	at Texas Tech	Jones AT&T Stadium; Lubbock, TX (Chancellor's Spurs)	FS1	W 34–13	60,961
November 8	2:30 p.m.	No. 24 West Virginia	Darrell K Royal–Texas Memorial Stadium; Austin, TX	FS1	W 33–16	95,714
November 15	6:30 p.m.	at Oklahoma State	Boone Pickens Stadium; Stillwater, OK	FOX	W 28–7	52,495
November 27	6:30 p.m.	No. 5 TCU^{†}	Darrell K Royal–Texas Memorial Stadium; Austin, TX (rivalry)	FS1	L 10–48	96,496
December 29	8:00 p.m.	vs. Arkansas*	NRG Stadium; Houston, TX (Texas Bowl, rivalry)	ESPN	L 7–31	71,115
*Non-conference game; ^{†}Homecoming; Rankings from AP Poll released prior to game; All times are in Central time

== Personnel ==
=== Coaching staff ===
Name	Position	Seasons at Texas
Charlie Strong	Head coach	1st
Shawn Watson	Assistant head coach For Offense/quarterbacks	1st
Chris Rumph	Assistant head coach For Defense/defensive line	1st
Joe Wickline	Offensive coordinator/offensive line	1st
Vance Bedford	Defensive coordinator/Secondary	1st
Chris Vaughn	Special teams coordinator/defensive Backs	1st
Brian Jean-Mary	Linebackers/recruiting coordinator	1st
Les Koenning	Wide receivers	1st
Tommie Robinson	Running backs	1st
Bruce Chambers	Tight ends	17th
Pat Moorer	Head coach for Strength & Conditioning	1st

=== Roster ===
Number	Name	Position	Height	Weight	Year
1	Shiro Davis	DE	6'3	253	Jr.
2	Mykkele Thompson	S	6'2	191	Sr.
3	Jordan Hicks	LB	6'1	234	Sr
4	William Russ	P/PK	6'3	206	Sr.
5	Josh Turner	S	5'11	175	Sr.
6	Quandre Diggs	CB	5'10	195	Sr.
7	Demarco Cobbs	LB	6'0	221	Sr.
7	Marcus Johnson	WR	6'1	193	Jr.
8	Jaxon Shipley	WR	6'0	190	Sr.
9	John Harris	WR	6'2	218	Sr.
11	Tevin Jackson	LB	6'2	245	Sr.
11	Jacorey Warrick	WR	5'11	172	So.
13	Jerrod Heard	QB	6'2	199	Fr.
14	David Ash	QB	6'3	230	Jr.
15	Bryson Echols	CB	5'10	184	So.
15	Trey Holtz	QB	6'0	190	So.
16	Jermaine Roberts Jr.	DB	5'9	171	Fr.
16	Logan Vinklarek	QB	6'1	217	So.
17	Cody Boswell	DB	5'11	180	Sr.
17	Miles Onyegbule	QB	6'4	230	Sr.
18	Tyrone Swoopes	QB	6'4	243	So.
18	Kevin Vaccaro	S	5'11	188	So.
19	Peter Jinkens	LB	6'1	237	Jr.
21	Donald Catalon	RB	5'10	195	Fr.
21	Duke Thomas	CB	5'11	178	Jr.
23	Daje Johnson	WR/RB	5'10	178	Jr.
23	Nick Rose	PK	6'2	203	Jr.
24	John Bonney	DB	5'10	181	Fr.
25	Antwuan Davis	CB	5'11	193	Fr.
25	Chris Giron	WR	5'8	160	Sr.
26	Adrian Colbert	S	6'1	206	So.
26	David Thomann	WR	6'0	184	Sr.
27	Roderick Bernard	WR	5'9	170	Fr.
27	Connor Huffman	WR	5'9	170	Fr.
28	Malcolm Brown	RB	5'11	222	Sr.
28	Nick Jordan	PK	6'1	175	So.
29	Hunter DeGroot	WR	6'1	207	Fr.
29	Sheroid Evans	CB	6'0	190	Sr.
30	Timothy Cole	LB	6'1	236	So.
30	Ryan Roberts	CB	5'8	170	Sr.
31	Jason Hall	DB	6'2	207	Fr.
31	Ben Pruitt	PK	6'1	215	Jr.
32	Johnathan Gray	RB	5'11	215	Jr.
32	Erik Huhn	S	6'3	209	Fr.
33	Steve Edmond	LB	6'2	258	Sr.
33	D'Onta Foreman	RB	6'2	215	Fr.
35	Michael Davidson	PK/Pv	6'4	200	Sr.
35	Edwin Freeman	S	6'1	220	Fr.
36	Dillon Boldt	DB	5'10	167	Jr.
36	Alex De La Torre	FB	6'1	241	Jr.
37	Nate Boyer	DS	5'10	195	Sr.
37	Devin Huffines	DB	6'0	195	Sr.
38	Mitchell Becker	P	6'2	190	Fr.
38	Tyler Lee	DB	5'10	185	So.
39	Brandon Allen	DB	6'2	200	Sr.
39	Gaston Davis	RB	5'11	193	Jr.
40	Naashon Hughes	LB	6'4	232	Fr.
41	Tyler Marriott	DB	6'1	192	So.
42	Caleb Bluiett	DE	6'3	261	So.
42	Dakota Haines	WR	6'1	195	Sr.
43	Logan Mills	DE	6'3	223	Jr.
44	Eddie Aboussie	RB	5'9	221	Sr.
44	Dylan Haines	DB	6'1	194	So.
45	Kyle Ashby	DS	6'1	227	So.
45	Cameron Hampton	LB	6'1	202	Fr.
46	Johnny Tseng	DE	6'1	220	So.
47	Andrew Beck	TE	6'3	242	Fr.
47	Chris Terry	TE	6'3	243	Sr.
48	Dominic Cruciani	FB	5'11	225	Jr.
48	Trey Gonzales	LB	6'0	219	Jr.
49	Derick Roberson	DE	6'3	219	Fr.
50	Jake Raulerson	C	6'5	281	Fr.
51	Terrell Cuney	OL	6'1	278	Fr.
52	Darius James	OG	6'5	304	Fr.
55	Dominic Espinosa	C	6'3	308	Sr.
55	Dalton Santos	LB	6'3	252	Jr.
56	Daniel Rodriguez	OL	6'2	299	So.
57	Clark Orren	OL	6'0	260	So.
58	Frank Lopez	OL	6'2	300	Fr.
62	Curtis Riser	OG	6'4	324	So.
63	Alex Anderson	OL	6'4	320	Fr.
65	Marcus Hutchins	OL	6'5	278	Jr.
66	Sedrick Flowers	OG	6'3	320	Jr.
68	Desmond Harrison	OT	6'8	313	Sr.
71	Camrhon Hughes	OT	6'7	324	So.
72	Elijah Rodriguez	OL	6'3	292	Fr.
74	Taylor Doyle	OG	6'4	298	Jr.
76	Kent Perkins	OT	6'5	330	So.
80	Blake Whiteley	TE	6'5	250	So.
81	Greg Daniels	TE	6'4	246	Sr.
82	Geoff Swaim	TE	6'4	250	Sr.
83	Matt Center	TE/DS	6'2	218	Fr.
83	Armanti Foreman	WR	6'0	189	Fr.
84	Lorenzo Joe	WR	6'2	201	Fr.
85	M.J. McFarland	TE	6'4	249	Jr.
86	Jake Oliver	WR	6'3	214	Fr.
87	Garrett Gray	WR	6'4	211	Fr.
88	Cedric Reed	DE	6'5	272	Sr.
88	Ty Templin	WR	6'0	195	So.
89	Dorian Leonard	WR	6'3	201	Fr.
90	Malcom Brown	DT	6'2	320	Jr.
91	Bryce Cottrell	DE	6'2	247	So.
93	Paul Boyette Jr.	DT	6'2	302	So.
94	Alex Norman	DT	6'4	288	So.
95	Poona Ford	DT	5'11	280	Fr.
96	Jake McMillon	DT	6'3	290	Fr.
97	Chris Nelson	DT	6'1	307	Fr.
98	Hassan Ridgeway	DT	6'4	307	So.
99	Desmond Jackson	DT	6'0	298	Sr.

== Game summaries ==
=== North Texas ===
North Texas at #24 Texas

Team	1	2	3	4	Total
Mean Green	0	0	0	7	7
• #24 Longhorns	7	14	7	10	38

- Date: August 30, 2014
- Location: Darrell K Royal–Texas Memorial Stadium
  Austin, TX
- Game start: 7:05 p.m. CST
- Elapsed time: 3:11
- Game attendance: 93,201
- Game weather: 72 °F (22 °C), partly cloudy, winds SE at 9 mph (14 km/h)
- Referee: Randy Christal
- TV announcers (LHN): Kevin Dunn, Ahmad D. Brooks, & Sam Adams

Scoring summary
1	4:06	UT	Malcolm Brown 1-yard rush, Nick Rose kick good	UT 7–0
2	9:13	UT	Malcolm Brown 3-yard rush, Nick Rose kick good	UT 14–0
2	2:41	UT	David Ash 1-yard rush, Nick Rose kick good	UT 21–0
3	10:35	UT	John Harris 8-yard pass from David Ash, Nick Rose kick good	UT 28–0
4	7:17	NT	James Jones fumble recovery in the end zone for a touchdown, Trevor Moore kick good	UT 28–7
4	4:21	UT	Nick Rose 34-yard field goal	UT 31–7
4	3:32	UT	Demarco Cobbs 28-yard interception return, Nick Rose kick good	UT 38–7

Coverage of Texas' game against North Texas was sponsored by Southwest Airlines and was broadcast on the Longhorn Network. The Longhorns won the pregame coin toss and elected to defer, thus kicking off the football to the North Texas Mean Green to begin the game. Following an interception by defensive back Dylan Haines of North Texas quarterback Josh Greer, the Longhorns had an opportunity to score, but ended up missing a 38 yard field goal. The first quarter remained scoreless until Texas scored on a rushing touchdown by Malcolm Brown. Towards the beginning of the second quarter, Josh Greer was intercepted by the Longhorns for a second time, leading to his benching and subsequent replacement by Andrew McNulty. Texas scored on two rushing touchdowns in the second quarter by Malcolm Brown and quarterback David Ash. At the end of the first half, the Longhorns led the Mean Green 21–0.

Texas began the second half with a 75 yard drive which culminated in an eight yard touchdown pass from David Ash to wide receiver John Harris and featured a 26 yard run by Malcolm Brown. The rest of the third quarter remained scoreless from both teams, though North Texas failed to capitalize on a fumble recovery. In the fourth quarter, a long punt by North Texas punter Blake Macek led to the Longhorns beginning a drive at their own one yard line. A second fumble on a snap by David Ash was recovered by the Mean Green in the end zone, resulting in North Texas' first and only score of the game. On Texas' subsequent drive, kicker Nick Rose scored a 34 yard field goal. The following North Texas drive ended with Texas' Demarco Cobbs returning an interception for a touchdown. This was the team's final score, and the game ended 38–7 with Texas winning.

The Longhorns defense allowed only 94 yards of offense, registering as the twelfth least in school history, while the 15 yards of offense allowed marked the eighth least in school history. The defense also caught four interceptions; this was the team's highest since 2009 against Oklahoma State. Texas' record for the football season was 1–0 following the win.

=== BYU ===
BYU at Texas

Team	1	2	3	4	Total
• Cougars	3	3	28	7	41
Longhorns	0	0	7	0	7

- Date: September 6
- Location: Darrell K Royal–Texas Memorial Stadium
  Austin, TX
- Game start: 6:36 p.m. CST
- Elapsed time: 3:18
- Game attendance: 93,463
- Game weather: 95 °F (35 °C), Sunny w/ 39% humidity, winds SE at 9mph
- Referee: Mike Defee
- TV announcers (FS1/ESPN Radio): Joe Davis, Joey Harrington, & Kris Budden (FS1)
  Bill Rosinski, David Norrie, & Joe Schad (ESPN Radio)

Scoring summary
1	3:30	BYU	Trevor Samson 21-yard Field Goal	BYU 3–0
2	6:34	BYU	Trevor Samson 29-yard Field Goal	BYU 6–0
3	12:06	BYU	Taysom Hill 30-yard rush, Trevor Samson kick good	BYU 13–0
3	9:22	BYU	Adam Hine 16-yard rush, Trevor Samson kick good	BYU 20–0
3	5:51	BYU	Taysom Hill 2-yard rush, Trevor Samson kick good	BYU 27–0
3	4:33	BYU	Taysom Hill 1-yard rush, Adam Hine kick good	BYU 34–0
3	0:29	UT	John Harris 13-yard pass from Tyrone Swoopes, Nick Rose kick good	BYU 34–7
4	8:05	BYU	Adam Hine 8-yard rush, Trevor Samson kick good	BYU 41–7

=== UCLA (The Advocare Cowboys Showdown) ===
UCLA vs. Texas

Team	1	2	3	4	Total
• #12 Bruins	3	0	7	10	20
Longhorns	0	10	0	7	17

- Date: September 20
- Location: AT&T Stadium
  Arlington, TX
- Game start: 7:16 p.m. CST
- Referee: Mike Cannon
- TV announcers (FOX/Sports USA): Gus Johnson, Charles Davis, & Molly McGrath (FOX)
  John Ahlers & Gary Barnett (Sports USA)

1st quarter scoring: UCLA - Kaʻimi Fairbairn 47-yard field goal

2nd quarter scoring: UT - Nick Rose 33-yard field goal; UT - M.J. McFarland 2-yard pass from Tyrone Swoopes (Rose kick)

3rd quarter scoring: UCLA - Nate Iese 3-yard pass from Jerry Neuheisel (Fairbairn kick)

4th quarter scoring: UCLA - Fairbairn 25-yard field goal; UT - John Harris 8-yard pass from Swoopes (Rose kick); UCLA - Jordan Payton 33-yard pass from Neuheisel (Fairbairn kick)

=== Kansas ===
Kansas at Texas

Team	1	2	Total
Jayhawks			0
Longhorns			0

- Date: September 27
- Game start: 4:00
- TV announcers (FS1): Tim Brando & Brady Quinn

=== Baylor ===
Baylor at Texas

Team	1	2	Total
Bears			0
Longhorns			0

- Date: October 4
- Game start: 3:30
- TV announcers (ABC/ESPN2): Bob Wischusen, Matt Millen, & Quint Kessenich

=== Oklahoma ===
Oklahoma at Texas

Team	1	2	Total
Sooners			0
Longhorns			0

- Date: October 11
- Game start: 12:00
- TV announcers (ABC): Sean McDonough, Chris Spielman, & Todd McShay

=== Iowa State ===
Iowa State at Texas

Team	1	2	Total
Cyclones			0
Longhorns			0

- Date: October 18
- Game start: 8:00
- TV announcers (Cyclones TV/LHN): Brent Blum & Sage Rosenfels/Kevin Dunn, Ahmad Brooks, & Jane Slater

=== Kansas State ===
Kansas State at Texas

Team	1	2	Total
Wildcats			0
Longhorns			0

- Date: October 25
- Game start: 12:00
- TV announcers (ESPN): Dave Pasch, Brian Griese, & Tom Luginbill

=== Texas Tech ===
Texas Tech at Texas

Team	1	2	Total
Red Raiders			0
Longhorns			0

- Date: November 1
- Game start: 7:30
- TV announcers (FS1): Tim Brando & Brady Quinn

=== West Virginia ===
West Virginia at Texas

Team	1	2	Total
Mountaineers			0
Longhorns			0

- Date: November 8
- Game start: 3:30
- TV announcers (FS1): Craig Bolerjack & Ryan Nece

=== Oklahoma State ===
Oklahoma State at Texas

Team	1	2	Total
Cowboys			0
Longhorns			0

- Date: November 15
- Game start: 3:30
- TV announcers (ESPN): Bob Wischusen, Matt Millen, & Quint Kessenich

=== TCU ===
TCU at Texas

Team	1	2	Total
Horned Frogs			0
Longhorns			0

- Date: November 27
- Game start: 7:30
- TV announcers (FS1): Gus Johnson, Charles Davis, & Molly McGrath

=== Arkansas (Texas Bowl) ===
Arkansas at Texas

Team	1	2	Total
Razorbacks			0
Longhorns			0

- Date: December 29
- Game start: 9:00
- TV announcers (ESPN/ESPN Radio): Dave Pasch, Brian Griese, & Tom Luginbill/Adam Amin, John Congemi, & Kayce Smith

== Rankings ==
Ranking movements Legend: ██ Increase in ranking ██ Decrease in ranking — = Not ranked RV = Received votes
	Week																
Poll	Pre	1	2	3	4	5	6	7	8	9	10	11	12	13	14	15	Final
AP	RV	RV	—	—	—	—	—	—	—	—	—	—	—	—	—	—	—
Coaches	24	25	—	—	—	RV	—	—	—	—	—	—	RV	RV	—	—	—
CFP	Not released									—	—	—	—	—	—	—	Not released
