= Clint Trickett =

American football player and coach (born 1991)

Current position
- Title: Offensive coordinator
- Team: Maryland
- Conference: Big Ten

Biographical details
- Born: March 19, 1991 (age 35); Tallahassee, Florida, U.S.

Playing career
- 2010–2012: Florida State
- 2013–2014: West Virginia
- Position: Quarterback

Coaching career (HC unless noted)
- 2015–2016: East Mississippi (QB)
- 2017–2019: Florida Atlantic (TE)
- 2020: Florida Atlantic (co-OC/QB)
- 2021: Marshall (WR/PGC)
- 2022–2023: Marshall (OC/QB)
- 2024: Georgia Southern (TE/PGC)
- 2025: Jacksonville State (OC/QB)
- 2026–present: Maryland (OC/QB)

Clinton James Trickett (born March 19, 1991) is an American football coach who serves as the offensive coordinator for the Maryland Terrapins football team. He was previously the offensive coordinator and quarterbacks coach at Jacksonville State University. He played college football at Florida State and West Virginia.

== Early years ==
Trickett attended North Florida Christian High School in Tallahassee, Florida. During his career he passed for over 5,300 yards and 59 touchdowns. He was ranked by Rivals.com as a three-star recruit. Trickett committed to Florida State University to play college football in September 2009.

== College career ==
=== Florida State ===
Trickett was redshirted as a freshman in 2010. As a redshirt freshman in 2011, Trickett was a backup to EJ Manuel. He made two starts during the season due to injuries to Manuel and played in nine games overall. In his first career start against Clemson, he completed 24 of 38 passes for 336 yards and three touchdowns. Overall, he completed 44 of 72 passes for 675 yards, seven touchdowns and four interceptions. As a sophomore in 2012, he appeared in eight games as Manuel's backup, completing 22 of 34 passes for 272 yards. After Manuel graduated, Trickett was expected to compete with Jameis Winston and Jacob Coker for the starting job for the 2013 season.

=== West Virginia ===
Trickett transferred to West Virginia University in May 2013. In his first season at West Virginia, Trickett played in eight games with seven starts. He completed 123 of 233 passes for 1,605 yards, seven touchdowns, and seven interceptions. As a senior in 2014 Trickett was named the starter for the season. He started 11 games, completing 281 of 419 passes for 3,285 yards with 18 touchdowns and 10 interceptions.

On December 26, 2014, Trickett announced he was retiring from football after sustaining five concussions in 14 months.

== Coaching career ==
Trickett started his coaching career in 2015 as the quarterbacks coach at East Mississippi Community College (EMCC) in Scooba, Mississippi, one of the most successful JuCo programs in the country in recent years. He was featured prominently in the Netflix series Last Chance U, which chronicled EMCC's 2015 and 2016 seasons.

In early 2017, Trickett accepted the position of tight ends coach at Florida Atlantic under Lane Kiffin. After Kiffin departed for Ole Miss in December 2019, Trickett was promoted to co-offensive coordinator and quarterbacks coach under new head coach Willie Taggart.

In January 2021, Trickett accepted the position of wide receivers coach at Marshall under first-year head coach Charles Huff. After one season, he was promoted to offensive coordinator and quarterbacks coach following the departure of his predecessor, Tim Cramsey. After the 2023 regular season, it was reported that Trickett was fired as offensive coordinator.

On February 29, 2024, Trickett was hired as the tight ends coach and pass game coordinator at Georgia Southern.

On December 22, 2024, it was announced that Trickett was hired as offensive coordinator and quarterbacks coach at Jacksonville State under first-year head coach Charles Kelly.

Trickett was announced as the new quarterbacks coach at Arkansas on December 19, 2025. Nearly 2 months later on February 17, 2026, it was announced that Trickett was leaving Arkansas to become the offensive coordinator at Maryland.

== Personal life ==
Trickett's father, Rick Trickett, was most recently an assistant coach at Florida State under Jimbo Fisher and previously coached at West Virginia, LSU and Auburn. His older brother, Travis Trickett, was the offensive coordinator at Georgia State. Travis is now a senior offensive assistant at West Virginia.
