= 2014 Southeastern Conference football season =

- League: NCAA Division I FBS
- Sport: Football
- Duration: August 28, 2014 through January 3, 2015
- Teams: 14

2015 NFL Draft
- Top draft pick: Dante Fowler (Florida)
- Picked by: Jacksonville Jaguars, 3rd overall

Regular season
- East champions: Missouri Tigers
- East runners-up: Georgia Bulldogs
- West champions: Alabama Crimson Tide
- West runners-up: Mississippi State Bulldogs

SEC Championship Game
- Champions: Alabama
- Runners-up: Missouri

Football seasons
- 2013 2015

2014 Southeastern Conference football standings
	Conf.			Overall
Team	W		L	W		L
Eastern Division
No. 14 Missouri x	7	–	1	11	–	3
No. 9 Georgia	6	–	2	10	–	3
Florida	4	–	4	7	–	5
Tennessee	3	–	5	7	–	6
South Carolina	3	–	5	7	–	6
Kentucky	2	–	6	5	–	7
Vanderbilt	0	–	8	3	–	9
Western Division
No. 4 Alabama x$^	7	–	1	12	–	2
No. 11 Mississippi State	6	–	2	10	–	3
No. 17 Ole Miss *	5	–	3	9	–	4
No. 22 Auburn	4	–	4	8	–	5
LSU *	4	–	4	8	–	5
Texas A&M	3	–	5	8	–	5
Arkansas	2	–	6	7	–	6
Championship: Alabama 42, Missouri 13
^ – College Football Playoff participant; $ – Conference champion; x – Division champion/co-champions; * LSU and Ole Miss vacated all wins (except for Ole Miss' win over Presbyterian) due to NCAA violations.; Rankings from AP Poll

The 2014 Southeastern Conference football season began on August 28 with Texas A&M visiting South Carolina on the new SEC Network. This season will feature new inter-division rivalry games: Texas A&M-South Carolina and Arkansas-Missouri.

== Preseason ==
=== Preseason All-SEC ===
First team offense
Position	Player	Class	Team
QB	Nick Marshall	Senior	Auburn
RB	T. J. Yeldon	Junior	Alabama
RB	Todd Gurley	Junior	Georgia
WR	Amari Cooper	Junior	Alabama
WR	Sammie Coates	Junior	Auburn
TE	O. J. Howard	Sophomore	Alabama
OL	La'el Collins	Senior	LSU
OL	Arie Kouandjio	Senior	Alabama
OL	Laremy Tunsil	Sophomore	Ole Miss
OL	Cedric Ogbuehi	Senior	Texas A&M
C	Reese Dismukes	Senior	Auburn

First team defense
Position	Player	Class	Team
DL	Robert Nkemdiche	Sophomore	Ole Miss
DL	Dante Fowler, Jr.	Junior	Florida
DL	A'Shawn Robinson	Sophomore	Alabama
DL	Gabe Wright	Senior	Auburn
LB	Trey DePriest	Senior	Alabama
LB	A. J. Johnson	Senior	Tennessee
LB	Ramik Wilson	Senior	Georgia
DB	Landon Collins	Junior	Alabama
DB	Vernon Hargreaves III	Sophomore	Florida
DB	Cody Prewitt	Senior	Ole Miss
DB	Deshazor Everett	Senior	Texas A&M

First Team Special Teams
Position	Player	Class	Team
P	Drew Kaser	Junior	Texas A&M
K	Marshall Morgan	Junior	Georgia
PR	Christion Jones	Senior	Alabama
KR	Christion Jones	Senior	Alabama

== Rankings ==
Legend
	Increase in ranking
	Decrease in ranking
	Not ranked previous week
RV	Received votes but were not ranked in Top 25 of poll

		Pre	Wk 2	Wk 3	Wk 4	Wk 5	Wk 6	Wk 7	Wk 8	Wk 9	Wk 10	Wk 11	Wk 12	Wk 13	Wk 14	Wk 15	Wk 16	Final
Alabama	AP	2 (1)	2 (1)	3 (1)	3 (1)	3 (6)	3 (13)	7	7	4	3	4	4	2 (16)	2 (21)	1 (25)	1 (27)	4
Alabama	C	2	2	2 (1)	2 (1)	2 (11)	1 (15)	7	7	4	3	4	3	2 (17)	1 (25)	1 (28)	1 (28)	4
Alabama	CFP	Not released									6	5	5	1	1	1	1	
Arkansas	AP				RV	RV	RV	RV	RV					RV	RV			RV
Arkansas	C	RV			RV	RV	RV	RV						RV	RV	RV		RV
Arkansas	CFP	Not released																
Auburn	AP	6	5	5	5	5	5	2 (23)	6	5	4	3	9	16	15	20	19	22
Auburn	C	5	5	5	5	5	5	2 (16)	8	6	4	3	9	17	16	21	19	23
Auburn	CFP	Not released									3	3	9	14	15	19	19	
Florida	AP	RV	RV	RV	RV							RV	RV					
Florida	C	RV	RV	RV	RV								RV					
Florida	CFP	Not released																
Georgia	AP	12	6 (2)	6 (1)	13	12	13	13	10	9	9	17	16	9	8	15	13	9
Georgia	C	12	8 (1)	6 (1)	14	13	12	10	10	9	8	17	14	10	9	15	13	9
Georgia	CFP	Not released									11	20	15	10	9	14	13	
Kentucky	AP							RV	RV									
Kentucky	C							RV	RV									
Kentucky	CFP	Not released																
LSU	AP	13	12 (1)	10	8	17	15	RV	RV	24	16	14	20	RV	RV	23	22	RV
LSU	C	13	12	9	8	18	15	RV	RV	23	17	15	20	RV	RV	24	23	RV
LSU	CFP	Not released									19	16	17			24	23	
Mississippi State	AP	RV	RV	RV	RV	14	12	3 (2)	1 (45)	1 (43)	1 (46)	1 (45)	1 (48)	4	4	10	8	11
Mississippi State	C	RV	RV	RV	RV	16	14	6	1 (26)	1 (36)	1 (41)	1 (40)	1 (41)	4	4	10	8	12
Mississippi State	CFP	Not released									1	1	1	4	4	10	7	
Missouri	AP	24	24	20	18	RV	24	23		RV	RV	RV	RV	19	17	14	16	14
Missouri	C	RV	22	22	19	RV	RV	24	RV	RV	RV	RV	RV	20	17	13	14	11
Missouri	CFP	Not released												20	17	16	16	
Ole Miss	AP	18	15	14	10	10	11	3	3 (3)	3 (3)	7	12	10	8	18	13	9	17
Ole Miss	C	19	17	15	12	11	11	4	3 (5)	3 (4)	9	13	10	8	19	14	12	19
Ole Miss	CFP	Not released									4	11	10	8	19	12	9	
South Carolina	AP	9	21	24	14	13	RV	RV	RV									
South Carolina	C	9 (1)	21	23	16	15	RV											
South Carolina	CFP	Not released																
Tennessee	AP		RV	RV														
Tennessee	C																	
Tennessee	CFP	Not released																
Texas A&M	AP	21	9 (2)	7 (2)	6 (3)	6 (4)	6	14	21	RV		RV	RV	RV	RV			RV
Texas A&M	C	20	13	8	7	7	7	14	21		RV		RV	RV	RV			RV
Texas A&M	CFP	Not released											24					
Vanderbilt	AP	RV																
Vanderbilt	C																	
Vanderbilt	CFP	Not released																

== Regular season ==
Index to colors and formatting
Non-conference matchup; SEC member won
Non-conference matchup; SEC member lost
Conference matchup

All times Eastern time. SEC teams in bold.

Rankings reflect those of the AP poll for that week until week 10 when CFP rankings are used.

=== Week One ===
Date	Time	Visiting team	Home team	Site	Broadcast	Result	Attendance	Reference
August 28	6:00 p.m.	#21 **Texas A&M**	#9 **South Carolina**	Williams-Brice Stadium • Columbia, South Carolina	SECN	**TAMU** 52–28	82,847	
August 28	8:00 p.m.	Boise State	#18 **Ole Miss**	Georgia Dome • Atlanta	ESPN	**W** 35–13	32,823	
August 28	9:15 p.m.	Temple	**Vanderbilt**	Vanderbilt Stadium • Nashville, Tennessee	SECN	**L** 7–37	31,731	
August 30	12:00 p.m.	Tennessee–Martin	**Kentucky**	Commonwealth Stadium • Lexington, Kentucky	SECN	**W** 59–14	50,398	
August 30	3:30 p.m.	South Dakota State	#24 **Missouri**	Faurot Field • Columbia, Missouri	ESPNU	**W** 38–18	60,589	
August 30	3:30 p.m.	West Virginia	#2 **Alabama**	Georgia Dome • Atlanta, Georgia	ABC	**W** 33–23	70,502	
August 30	4:00 p.m.	**Arkansas**	#6 **Auburn**	Jordan–Hare Stadium • Auburn, Alabama	SECN	**AUB** 45–21	87,451	
August 30	5:30 p.m.	#16 Clemson	#12 **Georgia**	Sanford Stadium • Athens, Georgia	ESPN	**W** 45–21	92,746	
August 30	7:00 p.m.	Idaho	**Florida**	Ben Hill Griffin Stadium • Gainesville, Florida	ESPNU	**Canceled**^{[a]}		
August 30	7:30 p.m.	Southern Miss	**Mississippi State**	Davis Wade Stadium • Starkville, Mississippi	SECN	**W** 49–0	61,889	
August 30	9:00 p.m.	#14 Wisconsin	#13 **LSU**	NRG Stadium • Houston, Texas	ESPN	**W** 28–24	71,599	
August 31	7:00 p.m.	Utah State	**Tennessee**	Neyland Stadium • Knoxville, Tennessee	SECN	**W** 38–7	102,455	

^{^[a]}The game between Florida and Idaho did not kickoff until 9:50 p.m due to inclement weather. The game was again delayed due to lightning after 10 seconds of play during which Florida returned the Idaho kickoff to the Idaho 14-yard line. The game was called as "suspended" 40 minutes after the second delay. Both schools' athletic directors decided on September 3 not to reschedule the game, thus declaring it a "no contest". Florida did agree to pay Idaho its promised fee of $975,000 and the schools agreed to schedule a game for the 2017 season.

Players of the week:

Offensive		Offensive lineman		Defensive		Defensive lineman		Special teams		Freshman	
Player	Team	Player	Team	Player	Team	Player	Team	Player	Team	Player	Team
Todd Gurley & Kenny Hill	Georgia & Texas A&M	Jon Toth	Kentucky	Amarlo Herrera	Georgia	Preston Smith	Mississippi State	Adam Griffith	Alabama	Daniel Carlson	Auburn

=== Week Two ===
Date	Time	Visiting team	Home team	Site	Broadcast	Result	Attendance	Reference
September 6	12:00 p.m.	#24 **Missouri**	Toledo	Glass Bowl • Toledo, Ohio	ESPN	**W** 49–24	24,196	
September 6	12:00 p.m.	Florida Atlantic	#2 **Alabama**	Bryant–Denny Stadium • Tuscaloosa, Alabama	SECN	**W** 41–0	100,306	
September 6	12:00 p.m.	Arkansas State	**Tennessee**	Neyland Stadium • Knoxville, Tennessee	SECN	**W** 34–19	99,538	
September 6	2:00 p.m.	UAB	**Mississippi State**	Davis Wade Stadium • Starkville, Mississippi	ESPN3	**W** 47–34	57,704	
September 6	3:30 p.m.	Ohio	**Kentucky**	Commonwealth Stadium • Lexington, Kentucky	ESPNU	**W** 20–3	51,910	
September 6	4:00 p.m.	Eastern Michigan	**Florida**	Ben Hill Griffin Stadium • Gainesville, Florida	SECN	**W** 65–0	81,049	
September 6	4:00 p.m.	Nicholls State	**Arkansas**	Razorback Stadium • Fayetteville, Arkansas	SECN	**W** 73–7	63,108	
September 6	4:30 p.m.	#15 **Ole Miss**	**Vanderbilt**	LP Field • Nashville, Tennessee	ESPN	**MISS** 41–3	43,260	
September 6	7:00 p.m.	San Jose	#5 **Auburn**	Jordan–Hare Stadium • Auburn, Alabama	ESPN2	**W** 59–13	87,451	
September 6	7:00 p.m.	East Carolina	#21 **South Carolina**	Williams-Brice Stadium • Columbia, South Carolina	ESPNU	**W** 33–23	80,899	
September 6	7:30 p.m.	Lamar	#9 **Texas A&M**	Kyle Field • College Station, Texas	SECN	**W** 73–7	104,728	
September 6	7:30 p.m.	Sam Houston State	#12 **LSU**	Tiger Stadium • Baton Rouge, Louisiana	SECN	**W** 56–0	100,338	

Players of the week:

Offensive		Offensive lineman		Defensive		Defensive lineman		Special teams		Freshman	
Player	Team	Player	Team	Player	Team	Player	Team	Player	Team	Player	Team
Maty Mauk	Missouri	Max Garcia	Florida	Cliff Coleman	Ole Miss	Preston Smith	Mississippi State	Elliot Fry	South Carolina	Jalen Hurd	Tennessee

=== Week Three ===
Date	Time	Visiting team	Home team	Site	Broadcast	Result	Attendance	Reference
September 13	12:00 p.m.	UCF	#20 **Missouri**	Faurot Field • Columbia, Missouri	SECN	**W** 38–10	60,348	
September 13	12:00 p.m.	UMass	**Vanderbilt**	Vanderbilt Stadium • Nashville, Tennessee	ESPN3	**W** 34–31	33,386	
September 13	3:30 p.m.	**Arkansas**	Texas Tech	Jones AT&T Stadium • Lubbock, Texas	ESPN	**W** 49–28	60,277	
September 13	3:30 p.m.	#6 **Georgia**	#24 **South Carolina**	Williams-Brice Stadium • Columbia SC	CBS	**SCAR** 38–35	84,232	
September 13	4:00 p.m.	UL-Lafayette	#14 **Ole Miss**	Vaught–Hemingway Stadium • Oxford, Mississippi	SECN	**W** 56–15	60,937	
September 13	4:00 p.m.	**Mississippi State**	South Alabama	Ladd–Peebles Stadium • Mobile, Alabama	ESPNews	**W** 35–3	38,129	
September 13	6:00 p.m.	Southern Miss	#3 **Alabama**	Bryant–Denny Stadium • Tuscaloosa, Alabama	ESPN2	**W** 52–12	101,821	
September 13	7:00 p.m.	UL-Monroe	#10 **LSU**	Tiger Stadium • Baton Rouge, Louisiana	ESPNU	**W** 31–0	101,194	
September 13	7:30 p.m.	**Kentucky**	**Florida**	Ben Hill Griffin Stadium • Gainesville, Florida	SECN	**FLA** 36–30 3OT	88,334	
September 13	8:00 p.m.	**Tennessee**	#4 Oklahoma	Gaylord Family Oklahoma Memorial Stadium • Norman, Oklahoma	ABC	**L** 10–34	85,622	
September 13	9:00 p.m.	Rice	#7 **Texas A&M**	Kyle Field • College Station, Texas	ESPN2	**W** 38–10	103,867	

Players of the week:

Offensive		Offensive lineman		Defensive		Defensive lineman		Special teams		Freshman	
Player	Team	Player	Team	Player	Team	Player	Team	Player	Team	Player	Team
Alex Collins	Arkansas	Corey Robinson	South Carolina	Shane Ray	Missouri	Preston Smith	Mississippi State	Kyle Christy	Florida	Garrett Johnson	Kentucky

=== Week Four ===
Date	Time	Visiting team	Home team	Site	Broadcast	Result	Attendance	Reference
September 18	7:30 p.m.	#5 **Auburn**	#20 Kansas State	Bill Snyder Family Stadium • Manhattan, Kansas	ESPN	**W** 20–14	53,045	
September 20	12:00 p.m.	Troy	#13 **Georgia**	Sanford Stadium • Athens, Georgia	SECN	**W** 66–0	92,746	
September 20	3:30 p.m.	#6 **Texas A&M**	SMU	Gerald J. Ford Stadium • University Park, Texas	ABC	**W** 58–6	34,820	
September 20	3:30 p.m.	**Florida**	#3 **Alabama**	Bryant–Denny Stadium • Tuscaloosa, Alabama	CBS	**ALA** 42–21	101,821	
September 20	4:00 p.m.	Indiana	#18 **Missouri**	Faurot Field • Columbia, Missouri	SECN	**L** 27–31	66,455	
September 20	7:00 p.m.	Northern Illinois	**Arkansas**	Razorback Stadium • Fayetteville, Arkansas	ESPNU	**W** 52–14	67,204	
September 20	7:00 p.m.	**Mississippi State**	#8 **LSU**	Tiger Stadium • Baton Rouge, Louisiana	ESPN	**MISS ST** 34–29	102,321	
September 20	7:30 p.m.	#14 **South Carolina**	**Vanderbilt**	Vanderbilt Stadium • Nashville, Tennessee	SECN	**SCAR** 48–34	34,441	

Players of the week:

Offensive		Offensive lineman		Defensive		Defensive lineman		Special teams		Freshman	
Player	Team	Player	Team	Player	Team	Player	Team	Player	Team	Player	Team
Amari Cooper & Dak Prescott	Alabama & Mississippi State	Ben Beckwith	Mississippi State	Joshua Holsey	Auburn	Trey Flowers	Arkansas	Darrius Sims	Vanderbilt	Sony Michel	Georgia

=== Week Five ===
Date	Time	Visiting team	Home team	Site	Broadcast	Result	Attendance	Reference
September 27	12:00 p.m.	**Tennessee**	#12 **Georgia**	Sanford Stadium • Athens, Georgia	ESPN	**UGA** 35–32	92,746	
September 27	12:00 p.m.	**Vanderbilt**	**Kentucky**	Commonwealth Stadium • Lexington, Kentucky	SECN	**UK** 17–7	56,940	
September 27	3:30 p.m.	#6 **Texas A&M**	**Arkansas**	AT&T Stadium • Dallas	CBS	**TAMU** 35–28 OT	68,113	
September 27	4:00 p.m.	Louisiana Tech	#5 **Auburn**	Jordan–Hare Stadium • Auburn, Alabama	SECN	**W** 45–17	87,451	
September 27	7:00 p.m.	**Missouri**	#13 **South Carolina**	Williams-Brice Stadium • Columbia, South Carolina	ESPN	**MIZZOU** 21–20	83,493	
September 27	7:30 p.m.	New Mexico State	#17 **LSU**	Tiger Stadium • Baton Rouge, Louisiana	SECN	**W** 63–7	101,987	
September 27	7:30 p.m.	Memphis	#10 **Ole Miss**	Vaught–Hemingway Stadium • Oxford MS	FSN	**W** 24–3	61,291	

Players of the week:

Offensive		Offensive lineman		Defensive		Defensive lineman		Special teams		Freshman	
Player	Team	Player	Team	Player	Team	Player	Team	Player	Team	Player	Team
Todd Gurley	Georgia	Darrian Miller	Kentucky	Deshazor Everett	Texas A&M	Shane Ray	Missouri	Quan Bray	Auburn	Brandon Harris	LSU

=== Week Six ===
Date	Time	Visiting team	Home team	Site	Broadcast	Result	Attendance	Reference
October 4	12:00 p.m.	**Florida**	**Tennessee**	Neyland Stadium • Knoxville, Tennessee	SECN	**FLA** 10–9	102,455	
October 4	12:00 p.m.	#6 **Texas A&M**	#12 **Mississippi State**	Davis Wade Stadium • Starkville, Mississippi	ESPN	**MISS ST** 48–31	61,133	
October 4	3:30 p.m.	#3 **Alabama**	#11 **Ole Miss**	Vaught–Hemingway Stadium • Oxford MS	CBS	**MISS** 23–17	61,826	
October 4	4:00 p.m.	**Vanderbilt**	#13 **Georgia**	Sanford Stadium • Athens, Georgia	SECN	**UGA** 44–17	92,746	
October 4	7:00 p.m.	#15 **LSU**	#5 **Auburn**	Jordan–Hare Stadium • Auburn, Alabama	ESPN	**AUB** 41–7	87,451	
October 4	7:30 p.m.	**South Carolina**	**Kentucky**	Commonwealth Stadium • Lexington, Kentucky	SECN	**UK** 45–38	62,135	

Players of the week:

Offensive		Offensive lineman		Defensive		Defensive lineman		Special teams		Freshman	
Player	Team	Player	Team	Player	Team	Player	Team	Player	Team	Player	Team
Bo Wallace	Ole Miss	Ben Beckwith	Mississippi State	Richie Brown	Mississippi State	Alvin Dupree	Kentucky	Daniel Carlson	Auburn	Jalen Tabor & Nick Chubb	Florida & Georgia

=== Week Seven ===
Date	Time	Visiting team	Home team	Site	Broadcast	Result	Attendance	Reference
October 11	12:00 p.m.	#13 **Georgia**	#23 **Missouri**	Faurot Field • Columbia, Missouri	CBS	**UGA** 34–0	71,168	
October 11	12:00 p.m.	UL-Monroe	**Kentucky**	Commonwealth Stadium • Lexington, Kentucky	SECN	**W** 48–14	56,676	
October 11	3:30 p.m.	#2 **Auburn**	#3 **Mississippi State**	Davis Wade Stadium • Starkville, Mississippi	CBS	**MISS ST** 38–23	62,945	
October 11	4:00 p.m.	Chattanooga	**Tennessee**	Neyland Stadium • Knoxville, Tennessee	SECN	**W** 45–10	93,097	
October 11	6:00 p.m.	#7 **Alabama**	**Arkansas**	Razorback Stadium • Fayetteville, Arkansas	ESPN	**ALA** 14–13	72,337	
October 11	7:30 p.m.	Charleston Southern	**Vanderbilt**	Vanderbilt Stadium • Nashville, Tennessee	FSN	**W** 21–20	26,738	
October 11	7:30 p.m.	**LSU**	**Florida**	Ben Hill Griffin Stadium • Gainesville, Florida	SECN	**LSU** 30–27	88,014	
October 11	9:00 p.m.	#3 **Ole Miss**	#14 **Texas A&M**	Kyle Field • College Station, Texas	ESPN	**MISS** 35–20	110,633	

Players of the week:

Offensive		Offensive lineman		Defensive		Defensive lineman		Special teams		Freshman	
Player	Team	Player	Team	Player	Team	Player	Team	Player	Team	Player	Team
Dak Prescott	Mississippi State	Vandal Alexander	LSU	Cody Prewitt	Ole Miss	Marquis Haynes	Ole Miss	J. K. Scott	Alabama	Nick Chubb & Leonard Fournette	Georgia & LSU

=== Week Eight ===
Date	Time	Visiting team	Home team	Site	Broadcast	Result	Attendance	Reference
October 18	12:00 p.m.	Furman	**South Carolina**	Williams-Brice Stadium • Columbia, South Carolina	SECN	**W** 41–10	78,101	
October 18	3:30 p.m.	#21 **Texas A&M**	#7 **Alabama**	Bryant–Denny Stadium • Tuscaloosa, Alabama	CBS	**ALA** 59–0	101,821	
October 18	4:00 p.m.	#10 **Georgia**	**Arkansas**	War Memorial Stadium • Little Rock, Arkansas	SECN	**UGA** 45–32	54,959	
October 18	7:00 p.m.	**Tennessee**	#3 **Ole Miss**	Vaught–Hemingway Stadium • Oxford, Mississippi	ESPN	**MISS** 34–3	62,081	
October 18	7:00 p.m.	**Missouri**	**Florida**	Ben Hill Griffin Stadium • Gainsesville, Florida	ESPN2	**MIZZOU** 42–13	89,117	
October 18	7:30 p.m.	**Kentucky**	**LSU**	Tiger Stadium • Baton Rouge, Louisiana	SECN	**LSU** 41–3	101,581	

Players of the week:

Offensive		Offensive lineman		Defensive		Defensive lineman		Special teams		Freshman	
Player	Team	Player	Team	Player	Team	Player	Team	Player	Team	Player	Team
Nick Chubb	Georgia	Arie Kouandjio	Alabama	Damian Swann	Georgia	Shane Ray	Missouri	Marcus Murphy	Missouri	Marquis Haynes	Ole Miss

=== Week Nine ===
Date	Time	Visiting team	Home team	Site	Broadcast	Result	Attendance	Reference
October 25	12:00 p.m.	UAB	**Arkansas**	Razorback Stadium • Fayetteville, Arkansas	SECN	**W** 45–17	61,800	
October 25	3:30 p.m.	#1 **Mississippi State**	**Kentucky**	Commonwealth Stadium • Lexington, Kentucky	CBS	**MISS ST** 45–31	64,791	
October 25	4:00 p.m.	**Vanderbilt**	**Missouri**	Faurot Field • Columbia, South Carolina	SECN	**MIZZOU** 24–14	65,264	
October 25	7:15 p.m.	#3 **Ole Miss**	#24 **LSU**	Tiger Stadium • Baton Rouge, Louisiana	ESPN	**LSU** 10–7	102,321	
October 25	7:30 p.m.	**South Carolina**	#5 **Auburn**	Jordan–Hare Stadium • Auburn, Alabama	SECN	**AUB** 42–35	87,451	
October 25	7:30 p.m.	#4 **Alabama**	**Tennessee**	Neyland Stadium • Knoxville, Tennessee	ESPN2	**ALA** 34–20	102,455	

Players of the week:

Offensive		Offensive lineman		Defensive		Defensive lineman		Special teams		Freshman	
Player	Team	Player	Team	Player	Team	Player	Team	Player	Team	Player	Team
Amari Cooper & Josh Robinson	Alabama & Mississippi State	Sebastian Tretola	Arkansas	Kendell Beckwith	LSU	Kaleb Eulls	Mississippi State	Will Gleeson	Ole Miss	Leonard Fournette	LSU

=== Week Ten ===
Date	Time	Visiting team	Home team	Site	Broadcast	Result	Attendance	Reference
November 1	12:00 p.m.	UL-Monroe	**Texas A&M**	Kyle Field • College Station, Texas	SECN	**W** 21–16	100,922	
November 1	3:30 p.m.	**Florida**	#11 **Georgia**	EverBank Field • Jacksonville, Florida	CBS	**FLA** 38–20	83,004	
November 1	4:00 p.m.	**Kentucky**	**Missouri**	Faurot Field • Columbia, South Carolina	SECN	**MIZZOU** 20–10	62,004	
November 1	7:00 p.m.	Old Dominion	**Vanderbilt**	Vanderbilt Stadium • Nashville, Tennessee	SECN	**W** 42–28	28,966	
November 1	7:00 p.m.	#3 **Auburn**	#4 **Ole Miss**	Vaught–Hemingway Stadium • Oxford, Mississippi	ESPN	**AUB** 35–31	62,090	
November 1	7:15 p.m.	**Arkansas**	#1 **Mississippi State**	Davis Wade Stadium • Starkville, Mississippi	ESPN2	**MISS ST** 17–10	62,307	
November 1	7:30 p.m.	**Tennessee**	**South Carolina**	Williams-Brice Stadium • Columbia, South Carolina	SECN	**TENN** 45–42 OT	81,891	

Players of the week:

Offensive		Offensive lineman		Defensive		Defensive lineman		Special teams		Freshman	
Player	Team	Player	Team	Player	Team	Player	Team	Player	Team	Player	Team
Joshua Dobbs	Tennessee	Max Garcia	Florida	Kris Frost	Auburn	Shane Ray	Missouri	Mike McNeely	Florida	Johnny McCrary	Vanderbilt

=== Week Eleven ===
Date	Time	Visiting team	Home team	Site	Broadcast	Result	Attendance	Reference
November 8	12:00 p.m.	#20 **Georgia**	**Kentucky**	Commonwealth Stadium • Lexington, Kentucky	ESPN	**UGA** 63–31	60,152	
November 8	12:00 p.m.	Presbyterian	#11 **Ole Miss**	Vaught–Hemingway Stadium • Oxford, Mississippi	SECN	**W** 48–0	60,546	
November 8	3:30 p.m.	**Texas A&M**	#3 **Auburn**	Jordan–Hare Stadium • Auburn, Alabama	CBS	**TAMU** 41–38	87,451	
November 8	4:00 p.m.	Tennessee–Martin	#1 **Mississippi State**	Davis Wade Stadium • Starkville, Mississippi	SECN	**W** 45–16	61,421	
November 8	7:30 p.m.	**Florida**	**Vanderbilt**	Vanderbilt Stadium • Nashville, Tennessee	SECN	**FLA** 34–10	35,191	
November 8	8:00 p.m.	#5 **Alabama**	#16 **LSU**	Tiger Stadium • Baton Rouge, Louisiana	CBS	**ALA** 20–13 OT	102,321	

Players of the week:

Offensive		Offensive lineman		Defensive		Defensive lineman		Special teams		Freshman	
Player	Team	Player	Team	Player	Team	Player	Team	Player	Team	Player	Team
Kyle Allen	Texas A&M	Arie Koanundjio	Alabama	Reggie Bagland	Alabama	Lorenzo Carter	Georgia	Isaiah McKenzie	Georgia	Treon Harris & Nick Chubb	Florida & Georgia

=== Week Twelve ===
Date	Time	Visiting team	Home team	Site	Broadcast	Result	Attendance	Reference
November 15	12:00 p.m.	**South Carolina**	**Florida**	Ben Hill Griffin Stadium • Gainesville, Florida	SECN	**SCAR** 23–20 OT	85,088	
November 15	3:00 p.m.	#1 **Mississippi State**	#5 **Alabama**	Bryant–Denny Stadium • Tuscaloosa, Alabama	CBS	**ALA** 25–20	101,821	
November 15	4:00 p.m.	**Kentucky**	**Tennessee**	Neyland Stadium • Knoxville, Tennessee	SECN	**TENN** 50–16	102,455	
November 15	7:15 p.m.	#9 **Auburn**	#15 **Georgia**	Sanford Stadium • Athens, Georgia	ESPN	**UGA** 34–7	92,746	
November 15	7:30 p.m.	**Missouri**	#24 **Texas A&M**	Kyle Field • College Station, Texas	SECN	**MIZZOU** 34–27	104,756	
November 15	8:00 p.m.	#17 **LSU**	**Arkansas**	Razorback Stadium • Fayetteville, Arkansas	ESPN2	**ARK** 17–0	70,165	

Players of the week:

Offensive		Offensive lineman		Defensive		Defensive lineman		Special teams		Freshman	
Player	Team	Player	Team	Player	Team	Player	Team	Player	Team	Player	Team
Russell Hansbrough	Missouri	Dan Skipper	Arkansas	Nick Perry & Martrell Spaight	Alabama & Arkansas	Derek Barnett	Tennessee	Nick Chubb	Georgia	J. K. Scott	Alabama

=== Week Thirteen ===
Date	Time	Visiting team	Home team	Site	Broadcast	Result	Attendance	Reference
November 22	12:00 p.m.	Eastern Kentucky	**Florida**	Ben Hill Griffin Stadium • Gainesville, Florida	SECN	**W** 52–3	83,399	
November 22	12:00 p.m.	South Alabama	**South Carolina**	Williams-Brice Stadium • Columbia, South Carolina	ESPN3	**W** 37–12	78,201	
November 22	12:00 p.m.	Charleston Southern	#10 **Georgia**	Sanford Stadium • Athens, Georgia	SECN	**W** 55–9	92,746	
November 22	3:30 p.m.	#8 **Ole Miss**	**Arkansas**	Razorback Stadium • Fayetteville, Arkansas	CBS	**ARK** 30–0	64,510	
November 22	4:00 p.m.	Western Carolina	#1 **Alabama**	Bryant–Denny Stadium • Tuscaloosa, Alabama	SECN	**W** 48–14	101,325	
November 22	7:00 p.m.	Samford	#14 **Auburn**	Jordan–Hare Stadium • Auburn, Alabama	ESPNU	**W** 31–7	87,451	
November 22	7:30 p.m.	#20 **Missouri**	**Tennessee**	Neyland Stadium • Knoxville, Tennessee	ESPN	**MIZZOU** 29–21	95,821	
November 22	7:30 p.m.	**Vanderbilt**	#4 **Mississippi State**	Davis Wade Stadium • Starkville, Mississippi	SECN	**MISS ST** 51–0	60,493	

=== Week Fourteen ===
Date	Time	Visiting team	Home team	Site	Broadcast	Result	Attendance	Reference
November 27	7:30 p.m.	**LSU**	**Texas A&M**	Kyle Field • College Station, Texas	ESPN	**LSU** 23–17	105,829	
November 28	2:30 p.m.	**Arkansas**	#17 **Missouri**	Faurot Field • Columbia, Missouri	CBS	**MIZZOU** 21–14	71,168	
November 29	12:00 p.m.	#16 Georgia Tech	#9 **Georgia**	Sanford Stadium • Athens, Georgia	SECN	**L** 24–30 OT	92,746	
November 29	12:00 p.m.	**South Carolina**	#21 Clemson	Memorial Stadium • Clemson, South Carolina	ESPN	**L** 17–35	82,720	
November 29	12:00 p.m.	**Kentucky**	#22 Louisville	Papa John's Cardinal Stadium • Louisville, Kentucky	ESPN2	**L** 40–44	55,118	
November 29	3:30 p.m.	**Florida**	#3 Florida State	Doak Campbell Stadium • Tallahassee, Florida	ESPN	**L** 19–24	82,485	
November 29	3:30 p.m.	#4 **Mississippi State**	#19 **Ole Miss**	Vaught–Hemingway Stadium • Oxford, Mississippi	CBS	**MISS** 31–17	62,058	
November 29	4:00 p.m.	**Tennessee**	**Vanderbilt**	Vanderbilt Stadium • Nashville, Tennessee	SECN	**TENN** 24–17	40,350	
November 29	7:45 p.m.	#15 **Auburn**	#1 **Alabama**	Bryant–Denny Stadium • Tuscaloosa, Alabama	ESPN	**ALA** 55–44	101,821	

=== SEC Championship Game ===
Date	Time	Visiting team	Home team	Site	Broadcast	Result	Attendance	Reference
December 6	4:00 p.m.	#1 **Alabama**	#16 **Missouri**	Georgia Dome • Atlanta, Georgia (2014 SEC Championship Game)	CBS	**ALA** 42–13	73,526	

== SEC vs Power Conference matchups ==
This is a list of the power conference teams (ACC, Big 10, Big 12, Pac-12) the SEC plays in the non-conference (Rankings from the AP Poll):

Date	Visitor	Home	Site	Significance	Score
August 30	West Virginia	#2 Alabama	Georgia Dome • Atlanta	Chick-fil-A Kickoff Game	W 33–23
August 30	#16 Clemson	#12 Georgia	Sanford Stadium • Athens, Georgia	Clemson–Georgia football rivalry	W 45–21
August 30	#14 Wisconsin	#13 LSU	NRG Stadium • Houston	Texas Kickoff	W 28–24
September 13	Arkansas	Texas Tech	Jones AT&T Stadium • Lubbock, Texas		W 49–28
September 13	Tennessee	#4 Oklahoma	Gaylord Family Oklahoma Memorial Stadium • Norman, Oklahoma		L 10–34
September 18	#5 Auburn	#20 Kansas State	Bill Snyder Family Football Stadium • Manhattan, Kansas		W 20–14
September 20	Indiana	#18 Missouri	Faurot Field • Columbia, Missouri		L 27–31
November 29	South Carolina	#23 Clemson	Memorial Stadium • Clemson, South Carolina	Battle of the Palmetto State	L 17–35
November 29	Florida	#1 Florida State	Doak Campbell Stadium • Tallahassee, Florida	Florida–Florida State football rivalry	L 19–24
November 29	#16 Georgia Tech	#8 Georgia	Sanford Stadium • Athens, Georgia	Clean, Old-Fashioned Hate	L 24–30 OT
November 29	Kentucky	#24 Louisville	Papa John's Cardinal Stadium • Louisville, Kentucky	Governor's Cup	L 40–44

== Bowl games ==
(Rankings from final CFP Poll)

Date	Bowl Game	Site	TV	SEC Team	Opponent	Score
January 3, 2015	Birmingham Bowl	Legion Field • Birmingham, Alabama	ESPN2	Florida	East Carolina	FLA 28–20
January 2, 2015	TaxSlayer Bowl	EverBank Field • Jacksonville, Florida	ESPN	Tennessee	Iowa	TENN 45–28
January 1, 2015	Sugar Bowl (CFP Semifinal)	Mercedes-Benz Superdome • New Orleans	ESPN	#1 Alabama	#4 Ohio State	OSU 42–35
January 1, 2015	Outback Bowl	Raymond James Stadium • Tampa, Florida	ESPN2	#19 Auburn	#18 Wisconsin	WIS 34–31 ^{OT}
January 1, 2015	Citrus Bowl	Citrus Bowl • Orlando, Florida	ABC	#16 Missouri	#25 Minnesota	MIZZ 33–17
December 31, 2014	Orange Bowl (New Year's Six)	Sun Life Stadium • Miami Gardens, Florida	ESPN	#7 Mississippi State	#12 Georgia Tech	GT 49–34
December 31, 2014	Peach Bowl (New Year's Six)	Georgia Dome • Atlanta	ESPN	#9 Ole Miss	#6 TCU	TCU 42–3
December 30, 2014	Belk Bowl	Bank of America Stadium • Charlotte, North Carolina	ESPN	#13 Georgia	#21 Louisville	UGA 37–14
December 30, 2014	Music City Bowl	LP Field • Nashville, Tennessee	ESPN	#23 LSU	Notre Dame	ND 31–28
December 29, 2014	Texas Bowl	NRG Stadium • Houston	ESPN	Arkansas	Texas	ARK 31–7
December 29, 2014	Liberty Bowl	Liberty Bowl • Memphis, Tennessee	ESPN	Texas A&M	West Virginia	TAMU 45–37
December 27, 2014	Independence Bowl	Independence Stadium • Ruston, Louisiana	ABC	South Carolina	Miami	SCAR 24–21

== Awards and honors ==
=== All-SEC Teams ===
The Southeastern Conference coaches voted for the All-SEC teams after the regular season concluded. Prior to the 2014 SEC Championship Game the teams were released. Alabama and Missouri placed the most representatives on the 2014 All-Southeastern Conference Coaches’ Football Team, the league office announced Tuesday. Both had seven total members, while Alabama had a league-leading five representatives on the first team. Twelve of the 14 SEC schools had a member on the first-team All-SEC squad.

Coaches were not permitted to vote for their own players.

Position	1st Team		2nd Team	
Position	Player	School	Player	School
QB	Dak Prescott	Mississippi State	Blake Sims	Alabama
RB	Nick Chubb	Georgia	Josh Robinson	Mississippi State
RB	Cameron Artis-Payne	Auburn	T. J. Yeldon	Alabama
WR	Amari Cooper	Alabama	Bud Sasser	Missouri
WR	Pharoh Cooper	South Carolina	Sammie Coates	Auburn
TE	Evan Engram	Ole Miss	Hunter Henry	Arkansas
C	Reese Dismukes	Auburn	Max Garcia	Florida
OG	Arie Kouandjio	Alabama	Vadal Alexander	LSU
OG	A. J. Cann	South Carolina	Mitch Morse	Missouri
OT	Cedric Ogbuehi	Texas A&M	Laremy Tunsil	Ole Miss
OT	La'el Collins	LSU	Ben Beckwith	Mississippi State
AP	Marcus Murphy	Missouri	Pharaoh Cooper	South Carolina
DL	Shane Ray	Missouri	Myles Garrett	Texas A&M
DL	Preston Smith	Mississippi State	Trey Flowers	Arkansas
DL	Dante Fowler	Florida	Derek Barnett	Tennessee
DL	Bud Dupree	Kentucky	Markus Golden	Missouri
LB	Benardrick McKinney	Mississippi State	Amarlo Herrera	Georgia
LB	Martrell Spaight	Arkansas	Ramik Wilson	Georgia
LB	Trey DePriest	Alabama	Antonio Morrison	Florida
DB	Landon Collins	Alabama	Jonathan Jones	Auburn
DB	Senquez Golson	Ole Miss	Braylon Webb	Missouri
DB	Vernon Hargreaves III	Florida	Damian Swann	Georgia
DB	Cody Prewitt	Ole Miss	Jonathon Mincy	Auburn
PK	Austin MacGinnis	Kentucky	Elliott Fry	South Carolina
P	J. K. Scott	Alabama	Jamie Keehn	LSU
RS	Marcus Murphy	Missouri	Quan Bray	Auburn

=== National Awards ===
- Amari Cooper, Alabama – Heisman Trophy (finalist; finished 3rd)
- Amari Cooper, Alabama – Fred Biletnikoff Award (wide receiver)
- Reese Dismukes, Auburn – Dave Rimington Trophy (center)
- Dan Mullen, Mississippi State – Maxwell Coach of the Year
- Nick Saban, Alabama – Bobby Dodd Coach of the Year Award

=== All-Americans ===
- WR – Amari Cooper, Alabama -- UNANIMOUS -- (AP, WCFF, TSN, AFCA, FWAA, USAT, CBS, ESPN, Scout, SI)
- OL – A. J. Cann, South Carolina (TSN, CBS, ESPN)
- OL – Reese Dismukes, Auburn -- CONSENSUS -- (AP, WCFF, AFCA, FWAA, CBS, ESPN, Scout)
- OL – Arie Kouandjio, Alabama (AFCA, USAT, SI)
- OL – Cedric Ogbuehi, Texas A&M (WCFF, Scout)
- DL – Shane Ray, Missouri -- CONSENSUS -- (WCFF, TSN, AFCA, FWAA, USAT, CBS, Scout, SI)
- LB – Trey DePriest, Alabama (AFCA)
- LB – Benardrick McKinney, Mississippi State (FWAA, ESPN, SI)
- DB – Landon Collins, Alabama -- UNANIMOUS -- (AP, WCFF, TSN, AFCA, FWAA, CBS, ESPN, Scout, SI)
- DB – Senquez Golson, Ole Miss -- UNANIMOUS -- (AP, WCFF, TSN, AFCA, FWAA, USAT, CBS, ESPN, Scout, SI)
- DB – Vernon Hargreaves III, Florida (TSN, CBS, ESPN)
- P – J. K. Scott, Alabama (TSN, USAT, ESPN, SI)
- AP – Marcus Murphy, Missouri (Scout)

== Home game attendance ==
Team	Stadium	Capacity	Game 1	Game 2	Game 3	Game 4	Game 5	Game 6	Game 7	Total	Average	% of Capacity
Alabama	Bryant–Denny Stadium	101,821	100,306	101,821	101,821	101,821	101,821	101,325	101,821	710,736	101,534	99.72%
Arkansas	Razorback Stadium	72,000	63,108	67,204	72,337	54,959^{A}	61,800	70,165	64,510	454,083	66,788	93.44%
Auburn	Jordan–Hare Stadium	87,451	87,451	87,451	87,451	87,451	87,451	87,451	87,451	612,157	87,451	100%
Florida	Ben Hill Griffin Stadium	88,548	81,049	88,334	88,014	89,117	85,088	83,399	—	515,001	85,834	96.93%
Georgia	Sanford Stadium	92,746	92,746	92,746	92,746	92,746	92,746	92,746	92,746	556,476	92,746	100%
Kentucky	Commonwealth Stadium	62,093	50,398	51,910	56,940	62,135	56,676	64,791	60,152	403,002	57,572	92.72%
LSU	Tiger Stadium	102,321	100,338	101,194	102,321	101,987	101,581	102,321	102,321	712,063	101,723	99.42%
Mississippi State	Davis Wade	61,337	61,889	57,704	61,133	62,945	62,307	61,421	60,493	427,892	61,127	99.66%
Missouri	Faurot Field	71,168	60,589	60,438	66,455	71,168	65,264	62,004	71,168	467,086	66,727	93.76%
Ole Miss	Vaught–Hemingway	60,580	60,937	61,291	61,826	62,081	62,090	60,546	62,058	430,829	61,547	101.60%
South Carolina	Williams-Brice Stadium	80,250	82,847	80,899	84,232	83,493	78,101	81,891	78,201	569,664	81,381	101.41%
Tennessee	Neyland Stadium	102,455	102,455	99,538	102,455	93,097	102,455	102,455	95,821	698,276	99,753	97.36%
Texas A&M	Kyle Field	106,511	104,728	103,867	110,633	100,922	104,756	105,829	—	630,735	105,122	98.70%
Vanderbilt	Vanderbilt Stadium	40,350	31,731	33,386	34,441	26,738	28,966	35,191	40,350	230,803	32,972	81.72%

^AGame played at Arkansas' secondary home stadium War Memorial Stadium, capacity: 53,955.

Attendance for SEC neutral-site games:

- 68,113 for Texas A&M vs. Arkansas @ Arlington, Texas
- 83,004 for Florida vs. Georgia @ Jacksonville
