= 2014 Texas A&M Aggies football team =

American college football season

2014 Texas A&M Aggies football

Liberty Bowl champion

Liberty Bowl, W 45–37 vs. West Virginia
- Conference: Southeastern Conference
- Western Division
- Record: 8–5 (3–5 SEC)
- Head coach: Kevin Sumlin (3rd season)
- Offensive coordinator: Jake Spavital (2nd season)
- Offensive scheme: Spread
- Defensive coordinator: Mark Snyder (3rd season; regular season); Mark Hagen (interim; bowl game)
- Base defense: Multiple 4–3
- Home stadium: Kyle Field

2014 Southeastern Conference football standings
	Conf.			Overall
Team	W		L	W		L
Eastern Division
No. 14 Missouri x	7	–	1	11	–	3
No. 9 Georgia	6	–	2	10	–	3
Florida	4	–	4	7	–	5
Tennessee	3	–	5	7	–	6
South Carolina	3	–	5	7	–	6
Kentucky	2	–	6	5	–	7
Vanderbilt	0	–	8	3	–	9
Western Division
No. 4 Alabama x$^	7	–	1	12	–	2
No. 11 Mississippi State	6	–	2	10	–	3
No. 17 Ole Miss *	5	–	3	9	–	4
No. 22 Auburn	4	–	4	8	–	5
LSU *	4	–	4	8	–	5
Texas A&M	3	–	5	8	–	5
Arkansas	2	–	6	7	–	6
Championship: Alabama 42, Missouri 13
^ – College Football Playoff participant; $ – Conference champion; x – Division champion/co-champions; * LSU and Ole Miss vacated all wins (except for Ole Miss' win over Presbyterian) due to NCAA violations.; Rankings from AP Poll

The 2014 Texas A&M Aggies football team represented Texas A&M University in the 2014 NCAA Division I FBS football season. They were led by third-year head coach Kevin Sumlin and played their home games at Kyle Field. They were a member of the Western Division of the Southeastern Conference (SEC). The Aggies finished the regular season 7–5 over all and 3–5 in SEC play. They were invited to the Liberty Bowl, where they defeated the West Virginia Mountaineers, 45–37. With the victory, the Aggies won four straight bowl games for the first time in program history.

== Preseason ==
=== Recruiting class ===
In the 2014 recruiting class, Texas A&M signed 22 players (21 not counting late qualifier J.J. Gustafson), 10 of which were included in the ESPN 300. The class was ranked 4th in the nation by ESPN, 6th by Rivals, and 7th nationally by Scout.

College recruiting information (2014)
Name	Hometown	School	Height	Weight	40^{‡}	Commit date
Otaro Alaka; OLB	Houston, TX	Cypress Falls HS	6 ft 3 in (1.91 m)	210 lb (95 kg)	5.17	Jan 17, 2014
Otaro Alaka; OLB	Recruit ratings: Scout: Rivals: 247Sports: ESPN:					
Kyle Allen; QB	Scottsdale, AZ	Desert Mountain HS	6 ft 4 in (1.93 m)	200 lb (91 kg)	4.87	Jun 3, 2013
Kyle Allen; QB	Recruit ratings: Scout: Rivals: 247Sports: ESPN:					
Cedric Collins; CB	Dallas, TX	Skyline HS	5 ft 10 in (1.78 m)	170 lb (77 kg)	–	Aug 23, 2012
Cedric Collins; CB	Recruit ratings: Scout: Rivals: 247Sports: ESPN:					
Qualen Cunningham; DE	Chandler, AZ	Hamilton HS	6 ft 4 in (1.93 m)	220 lb (100 kg)	4.70	Oct 24, 2013
Qualen Cunningham; DE	Recruit ratings: Scout: Rivals: 247Sports: ESPN:					
Kealvin Davis; OT	Garland, TX	Lakeview Centennial HS	6 ft 5 in (1.96 m)	247 lb (112 kg)	5.0	Jan 28, 2013
Kealvin Davis; OT	Recruit ratings: Scout: Rivals: 247Sports: ESPN:					
Jermaine Eluemunor; OL	Rockaway, NJ	Lackawanna JC	6 ft 5 in (1.96 m)	300 lb (140 kg)	–	Oct 28, 2013
Jermaine Eluemunor; OL	Recruit ratings: Scout: Rivals: 247Sports: ESPN:					
Myles Garrett; DE	Arlington, TX	James Martin HS	6 ft 5 in (1.96 m)	247 lb (112 kg)	5.08	Oct 18, 2013
Myles Garrett; DE	Recruit ratings: Scout: Rivals: 247Sports: ESPN:					
Avery Gennesy; OL	Southaven, MS	East Mississippi CC	6 ft 5 in (1.96 m)	315 lb (143 kg)	–	Nov 28, 2013
Avery Gennesy; OL	Recruit ratings: Scout: Rivals: 247Sports: ESPN:					
J.J. Gustafson; OT	Dallas, TX	Jesuit College Prep (LQ)	6 ft 5 in (1.96 m)	275 lb (125 kg)	–	Dec 23, 2013
J.J. Gustafson; OT	Recruit ratings: Scout: Rivals: 247Sports: ESPN:					
Nick Harvey; ATH/DB	Richmond, TX	William B. Travis HS	5 ft 11 in (1.80 m)	180 lb (82 kg)	4.40	Nov 27, 2012
Nick Harvey; ATH/DB	Recruit ratings: Scout: Rivals: 247Sports: ESPN:					
Zaycoven Henderson; DT	Longview, TX	Longview HS	6 ft 1 in (1.85 m)	305 lb (138 kg)	–	Jan 8, 2014
Zaycoven Henderson; DT	Recruit ratings: Scout: Rivals: 247Sports: ESPN:					
Frank Iheanacho; WR	Houston, TX	Westside HS	6 ft 7 in (2.01 m)	220 lb (100 kg)	–	Jan 4, 2014
Frank Iheanacho; WR	Recruit ratings: Scout: Rivals: 247Sports: ESPN:					
Jamal Jeffery; WR	Lufkin, TX	Lufkin HS	5 ft 9 in (1.75 m)	170 lb (77 kg)	–	Dec 14, 2012
Jamal Jeffery; WR	Recruit ratings: Scout: Rivals: 247Sports: ESPN:					
Jarrett Johnson; DE	Katy, TX	Seven Lakes HS	6 ft 3 in (1.91 m)	225 lb (102 kg)	–	Jun 3, 2013
Jarrett Johnson; DE	Recruit ratings: Scout: Rivals: 247Sports: ESPN:					
Zachary Ledwik; OT	La Grange, TX	La Grange HS	6 ft 5 in (1.96 m)	250 lb (110 kg)	5.04	Jun 15, 2013
Zachary Ledwik; OT	Recruit ratings: Scout: Rivals: 247Sports: ESPN:					
Koda Martin; OT/TE	Manvel, TX	Manvel HS	6 ft 6 in (1.98 m)	247 lb (112 kg)	–	Jun 9, 2013
Koda Martin; OT/TE	Recruit ratings: Scout: Rivals: 247Sports: ESPN:					
Speedy Noil; ATH/WR	New Orleans, LA	Edna Karr HS	6 ft 0 in (1.83 m)	176 lb (80 kg)	4.45	Jan 2, 2014
Speedy Noil; ATH/WR	Recruit ratings: Scout: Rivals: 247Sports: ESPN:					
Josh Reynolds; WR	San Antonio, TX	Tyler Junior College	6 ft 3 in (1.91 m)	178 lb (81 kg)	–	Dec 5, 2013
Josh Reynolds; WR	Recruit ratings: Scout: Rivals: 247Sports: ESPN:					
Josh Walker; OLB	Gilmer, TX	Gilmer HS	6 ft 1 in (1.85 m)	220 lb (100 kg)	4.54	Oct 29, 2012
Josh Walker; OLB	Recruit ratings: Scout: Rivals: 247Sports: ESPN:					
DeShawn Washington; DT	Nederland, TX	Nederland HS	6 ft 3 in (1.91 m)	275 lb (125 kg)	–	Mar 2, 2013
DeShawn Washington; DT	Recruit ratings: Scout: Rivals: 247Sports: ESPN:					
Armani Watts; ATH/DB	Forney, TX	North Forney HS	5 ft 11 in (1.80 m)	183 lb (83 kg)	4.70	Mar 2, 2013
Armani Watts; ATH/DB	Recruit ratings: Scout: Rivals: 247Sports: ESPN:					
Donovan Wilson; ATH/DB	Shreveport, LA	Woodlawn HS	6 ft 1 in (1.85 m)	180 lb (82 kg)	4.85	Jan 24, 2014
Donovan Wilson; ATH/DB	Recruit ratings: Scout: Rivals: 247Sports: ESPN:					
Overall recruit ranking: Scout: 7 Rivals: 6 247Sports: 5 ESPN: 4
‡ Refers to 40-yard dash; Note: In many cases, Scout, Rivals, 247Sports, On3, and ESPN may conflict in their listings of height, weight and 40 time.; In these cases, the average was taken. ESPN grades are on a 100-point scale.; Sources: "Texas A&M Football Commitment List 2014". Rivals.; "Texas A&M College Football Recruiting Commits 2014". Scout.; "Texas A&M Aggies Commits 2014". ESPN.; "Scout.com Team Recruiting Rankings". Scout.; "2014 Team Ranking". Rivals.com.

== Personnel ==
=== Roster ===
2014 Texas A&M Aggies football team roster
Players
Coaches
**Offense**

Pos.	#	Name	Class
RB	1	Brandon Williams	Jr
WR	2	Speedy Noil	Fr
RB	3	Trey Williams	Jr
WR	6	LaQuvionte Gonzalez	So
QB	7	Kenny Hill	So
WR	9	Ricky Seals-Jones	Fr
QB	10	Kyle Allen	Fr
WR	11	Josh Reynolds	So
WR	13	Jamal Jeffery	Fr
QB	14	Conner McQueen	So
WR	15	Frank Iheanacho	Fr
QB	16	Kobe Miller	Fr
QB	17	Jordan Traylor	Fr
WR	18	Edward Pope	So
WR	19	Jeremy Tabuyo	So
RB	20	James White	Fr
RB	21	Tra Carson	Jr
WR	23	Sabian Holmes	Jr
RB	26	Chance Gray	So
RB	27	Brice Dolezal	Jr
RB	34	Blaine Townsend	Jr
RB	37	Kameron Yellin	So
TE	41	Brandon Alexander	Jr
WR	42	Josch Motley	Fr
OL	47	Caden Smith	Jr
WR	48	Dreagan Patterson	So
OL	50	Tank Davis	Fr
OL	51	Jarvis Harrison	Sr
OL	56	Mike Matthews	Jr
OL	61	Braden Meador	So
OL	62	Chad Loitz	Fr
OL	63	Ryan Lindblade	So
OL	64	Trey Parker	Fr
OL	65	Avery Gennesy	Jr
OL	67	Tyler Godwin	So
OL	68	Ben Compton	Sr
OL	70	Cedric Ogbuehi	Sr
OL	71	Kimo Tipoti	So
OL	72	Jermaine Eluemunor	Jr
OL	73	Jeremiah Stuckey	So
OL	74	Germain Ifedi	So
OL	75	Koda Martin	Fr
OL	76	Zach Ledwik	Fr
OL	77	J.J. Gustafson	Fr
OL	78	Garrett Gramling	Sr
OL	79	Joseph Cheek	Jr
WR	80	Kyrion Parker	Fr
WR	81	Jalyn Judkins	Fr
WR	82	Boone Niederhofer	So
WR	83	Kyle Whitley	Fr
WR	84	Malcome Kennedy	Sr
TE	85	Cameron Clear	Sr
TE	86	David Darley	Fr
WR	88	Bryce Reeves	Fr

**Defense**

Pos.	#	Name	Class
DB	1	De'Vante Harris	Jr
LB	3	Tommy Sanders	Sr
DB	4	Noel Ellis	So
DB	5	Floyd Raven Sr.	Sr
LB	7	Jordan Mastrogiovanni	So
DB	8	Nick Harvey	Fr
DL	9	Qualen Cunningham	Fr
DL	10	Daeshon Hall	So
DB	12	Sam Moeller	Jr
LB	13	Reggie Chevis	Fr
LB	14	Josh Walker	Fr
DL	15	Myles Garrett	Fr
LB	16	Donnie Baggs	Sr
DB	17	Alex Sezer Jr.	So
DB	18	Donovan Wilson	Fr
DB	22	Tavares Garner	So
DB	23	Armani Watts	Fr
DB	25	Clay Honeycutt	Sr
DB	26	Devonta Burns	Jr
DB	27	Shane Huhn	So
DB	28	Victor Davis	Fr
DB	29	Deshazor Everett	Sr
DB	31	Howard Matthews	Sr
LB	32	Kevin Wilson	Jr
LB	33	Shaan Washington	So
LB	35	Tyrell Taylor	Sr
DB	36	Jonathan Wiggins	So
DL	40	Jarrett Johnson	Fr
LB	42	Otaro Alaka	Fr
LB	43	Justin Bass	Sr
LB	45	Cullen Gillaspia	Fr
LB	46	A.J. Hilliard (injured)	So
LB	49	Taylor Martinez	So
LB	50	Tyrone Taylor	So
LB	52	Brett Wade	Fr
DL	54	Jake Blount	So
DL	55	Justin Manning	Fr
LB	57	Alvin Munrose	So
LB	58	Cameron Smith	Jr
DL	59	Isaac Flores	So
DL	67	Tyler Godwin	So
DL	83	Alonzo Williams	Jr
DL	89	Ivan Robinson	Sr
DL	90	Deshawn Washington	Fr
DL	92	Zaycoven Henderson	Fr
DL	94	Tanner Schorp	Fr
DL	95	Julien Obioha	Jr
DL	96	Jay Arnold	So
DL	97	Darrell Jackson	Fr
DL	98	Hardreck Walker	So

**Special teams**

Pos.	#	Name	Class
PK	24	Taylor Bertolet	Jr
PK	30	Dillon Moore	Fr
DS	37	Jordan Frese	Fr
P	38	Drew Kaser	Jr
DS	39	Daniel Havens	Fr
P	46	Shane Tripucka	Fr
PK	49	Josh Lambo	Jr
DS	54	Alex Freeman	Sr
PK	97	Cody Wicker	Fr

Head coach

- Kevin Sumlin (3rd season)

Coordinators/assistant coaches

- B.J. Anderson – Offensive line
- Jeff Banks – Special teams coordinator/tight ends
- David Beaty – Wide receivers/recruiting coordinator
- Mark Hagen – Linebackers+ Bowl Game Defensive coordinator
- Mikado Hinson – Director of player development
- Larry Jackson – Director of Football Sports Performance
- Scott Johnston – Director of Recruiting
- Terry Joseph – Secondary
- Clarence McKinney – Running backs
- Justin Moore – Associate Athletic Director
- Terry Price – Defensive line
- Gary Reynolds – Director of football operations
- Mark Snyder – Defensive coordinator
- Jake Spavital – Offensive coordinator/quarterbacks

Legend

- **(C)** Team captain
- **(S)** Suspended
- **(I)** Ineligible
- Injured
- Redshirt

Roster
Last update: July 28, 2014

=== Returning starters ===
Offense
**Player**	**Class**	**Position**
Cedric Ogbuehi	Senior (RS)	Left Tackle
Jarvis Harrison	Senior (RS)	Left Guard
Mike Matthews	Junior	Center
Germain Ifedi	Sophomore (RS)	Right Tackle
Malcome Kennedy	Senior (RS)	Wide Receiver

Defense
**Player**	**Class**	**Position**
Julien Obioha	Junior	Defensive End
Alonzo Williams	Junior	Defensive tackle
Deshazor Everett	Senior	Corner
Howard Matthews	Junior	Safety

Special Teams
**Player**	**Class**	**Position**
Josh Lambo	Senior	Kicker
Taylor Bertolet	Sophomore (RS)	Kicker (Kickoffs)
Drew Kaser	Junior	Punter
Trey Williams	Junior	Kick return

=== Depth chart ===
- **Bold** denotes a starter from the previous year

**Defense**

FS
Armani Watts
**Floyd Raven Sr.** OR Clay Honeycutt

WLB	Mike	SLB
⋅	Josh Walker	⋅
Tommy Sanders	Jordan Mastrogiovanni	⋅

BS
**Howard Matthews**
Donovan Wilson OR Clay Honeycutt

CB
Devante Harris
Victor Davis

DE	DT	DT	DE
Myles Garrett	Hardreck Walker	**Alonzo Williams**	**Julien Obioha**
Daeshon Hall	Zaycoven Henderson	Ivan Robinson	Qualen Cunningham OR Jarrett Johnson

CB
**Deshazor Everett**
Tavares Garner

**Offense**

WR
Speedy Noil
Edward Pope

WR
Ricky Seals-Jones
Sabian Holmes OR LaQuvionte Gonzalez

LT	LG	C	RG	RT
**Cedric Ogbuehi**	**Jarvis Harrison**	**Mike Matthews**	Joseph Cheek	**Germain Ifedi**
Avery Gennesy	Garrett Gramling	Ben Compton	Jermaine Eluemunor	Ryan Lindblade

WR
**Malcome Kennedy**
Jeremy Tabuyo

WR
Josh Reynolds
Frank Iheanacho

QB
Kyle Allen
Kenny Hill

RB
Tra Carson OR Brandon Williams OR Trey Williams
James White

Special teams
**PK** **Josh Lambo**
**PK** Taylor Bertolet
**P** **Drew Kaser**
**P** Shane Tripucka
**KR** **Trey Williams**
**PR** Speedy Noil
**LS** Alex Freeman
**H** Drew Kaser

== Schedule ==
Date	Time	Opponent	Rank	Site	TV	Result	Attendance
August 28	5:00 p.m.	at No. 9 South Carolina	No. 21	Williams-Brice Stadium; Columbia, SC (SEC Nation)	SECN	W 52–28	82,847
September 6	6:30 p.m.	Lamar*	No. 9	Kyle Field; College Station, TX	SECN	W 73–3	104,728
September 13	8:00 p.m.	Rice*	No. 7	Kyle Field; College Station, TX	ESPN2	W 38–10	103,867
September 20	2:30 p.m.	at SMU*	No. 6	Gerald J. Ford Stadium; University Park, TX	ABC/ESPN2	W 58–6	34,820
September 27	2:30 p.m.	vs. Arkansas	No. 6	AT&T Stadium; Arlington, TX (Southwest Classic)	CBS	W 35–28 ^{OT}	68,113
October 4	11:00 a.m.	at No. 12 Mississippi State	No. 6	Davis Wade Stadium; Starkville, MS (SEC Nation)	ESPN	L 31–48	61,133
October 11	8:00 p.m.	No. 3 Ole Miss	No. 14	Kyle Field; College Station, TX	ESPN	L 20–35	110,633‡
October 18	2:30 p.m.	at No. 7 Alabama	No. 21	Bryant–Denny Stadium; Tuscaloosa, AL	CBS	L 0–59	101,821
November 1	11:00 a.m.	Louisiana–Monroe*		Kyle Field; College Station, TX	SECN	W 21–16	100,922
November 8	2:30 p.m.	at No. 3 Auburn		Jordan–Hare Stadium; Auburn, AL	CBS	W 41–38	87,451
November 15	6:30 p.m.	Missouri	No. 24	Kyle Field; College Station, TX (SEC Nation)	SECN	L 27–34	104,756
November 27	6:30 p.m.	LSU		Kyle Field; College Station, TX (rivalry)	ESPN	L 17–23	105,829
December 29	1:00 p.m.	vs. West Virginia*		Liberty Bowl Memorial Stadium; Memphis, TN (Liberty Bowl)	ESPN	W 45–37	51,282
*Non-conference game; Rankings from AP Poll and CFP Rankings after October 28 released prior to game; All times are in Central time

Schedule source:

== Coaching staff ==
Name	Position	Season at Texas A&M
Kevin Sumlin	Head coach	3rd
Mark Snyder	Defensive coordinator and linebackers coach	3rd
Terry Joseph	Defensive backs coach	1st
Terry Price	Defensive line coach	3rd
Mark Hagen	Linebackers coach	2nd
Jake Spavital	Offensive coordinator and quarterbacks coach	2nd
Clarence McKinney	Running backs coach	3rd
David Beaty	Wide receivers coach	3rd
B.J. Anderson	Offensive line coach	3rd
Jeff Banks	Special teams coordinator and tight ends coach	2nd
Larry Jackson	Director of football sports performance	3rd

== Game summaries ==
- ‡ New Kyle Field Attendance Record

=== No. 9 South Carolina ===
No. 21 Texas A&M Aggies vs No. 9 South Carolina Gamecocks – Game summary

Quarter	1	2	3	4	Total
#21 Texas A&M	10	21	14	7	52
#9 South Carolina	7	7	14	0	28

at Williams-Brice Stadium • Columbia, SC

- Date: August 28, 2014
- Game time: 5:01 p.m. CST
- Game weather: 94 °F (34 °C), sunny, winds S at 3 mph (4.8 km/h)
- Game attendance: 82,847
- Referee: Matt Austin
- TV announcers (SECN/WW1): Brent Musburger, Jesse Palmer, Maria Taylor, and Kaylee Hartung/John Sadak and Chris Doering
- Sources:
  - Official Texas A&M Game Notes (PDF)

Game information

First quarter

- A&M – Tra Carson 1-yard run (Josh Lambo Kick), 11:27 (A&M 7–0)
- A&M – Josh Lambo 33-yard Field Goal, 5:02 (A&M 10–0)
- USC – Nick Jones 69-yard pass from Dylan Thompson (Elliott Fry Kick), 3:44 (A&M 10–7)

Second quarter

- A&M – Ricky Seals-Jones 3-yard pass from Kenny Hill (Josh Lambo Kick), 11:56 (A&M 17–7)
- USC – Damiere Byrd 46-yard pass from Dylan Thompson (Elliott Fry Kick), 9:47 (A&M 17–14)
- A&M – Edward Pope 14-yard pass from Kenny Hill (Josh Lambo Kick), 7:07 (A&M 24–14)
- A&M – Tra Carson 2-yard run (Josh Lambo Kick), 1:16 (A&M 31–14)

Third quarter

- A&M – Josh Reynolds 5-yard pass from Kenny Hill (Josh Lambo Kick), 11:08 (A&M 38–14)
- USC – Pharoh Cooper 5-yard pass from Dylan Thompson (Elliott Fry Kick), 7:33 (A&M 38–21)
- A&M – Tra Carson 2-yard run (Josh Lambo Kick), 5:06 (A&M 45–21)
- USC – Nick Jones 10-yard pass from Dylan Thompson (Elliott Fry Kick), 2:38 (A&M 45–28)

Fourth quarter

- A&M – Trey Williams 2-yard run (Josh Lambo Kick), 12:09 (A&M 52–28)

Top passers

- A&M – Kenny Hill; 44/60, 511 yards, 3 TD
- USC – Dylan Thompson; 20/40, 366 yards, 4 TD, 1 INT

Top rushers

- A&M – Trey Williams; 13 carries, 78 yards (6.0 avg.), 1 TD
- USC – Brandon Wilds; 9 carries, 45 yards (5.0 avg.)

Top receivers

- A&M – Malcome Kennedy; 14 receptions, 137 yards (9.8 avg.)
- USC – Nick Jones; 5 receptions, 113 yards (22.6 avg.), 2 TD

Kenny Hill broke Johnny Manziel's record for passing yards in a single game with 511, and also threw for 3 touchdowns. Tra Carson averaged a little more than 4 yards a carry (4.3) on 7 rushes for 30 yards and 3 touchdowns. Their performances helped the Aggies score on 8 of 12 possessions while compiling 680 yards of total offense over 37:28 minutes of possession. An important factor in the game was 3rd and 4th down efficiency. The Aggies converted 12 of 19 attempts on third down (63%) while going 2/2 on 4th down. The Gamecocks went only 2/9 on 3rd down (22%) and 0/1 on 4th down.

Texas A&M received the ball to open the game, with Trey Williams returning the kick to the 32-yard line. After several plays, including a pair of swing passes to RB Brandon Williams, a third-down conversion pass to TE Cameron Clear, and a 22-yard pass to WR Ricky Seals-Jones, Texas A&M was set up on the South Carolina 1-yard line, where Aggie RB Tra Carson ran the ball in to give the Aggies the first TD of the game with 11:27 on the clock. The Gamecocks' ensuring drive gained just 15 yards (14 of which was penalty yardage) before ending in a punt to the Aggies. A&M found more offensive success on their drive, including 19-yard and 18-yard passes to Josh Reynolds and Sabian Holmes respectively. However, they could not convert a 3rd and 3 at South Carolina's 15 yard line, and settled for the 33-yard field goal by Josh Lambo, extending the Aggies' lead to 10-0. However, South Carolina soon answered the points, with a 3rd-and-4, 69-yard pass to WR Nick Jones for a TD, which cut A&M's lead to 3. The Aggies' following drive led to a punt, and the Gamecocks would gain 22 yards on their next drive before the end of the 1st quarter, with the score still 10-7 Texas A&M.

South Carolina maintained possession to open the second quarter, but after a sack by LB A.J. Hilliard for −2 yards on third down, the Aggies got the ball back. Their possession had several explosive plays, including an 11-yard run by Trey Williams, a 21-yard pass to Ricky Seals-Jones, and a 15-yard pass to Edward Pope before being capped off by a 3-yard pass to Ricky Seals-Jones for the TD, making the score 17-7. The Gamecocks answered this score too, on a long 46-yard pass to Damiere Byrd for a touchdown, cutting the game to 17–14. Texas A&M’s offense proved difficult to stop, however, and their next possession contained more big-yardage plays, including a 19-yard pass to Ricky Seals-Jones, a 16-yard pass to RB Tra Carson, and the 14-yard pass to Edward Pope for the touchdown. South Carolina could not answer that score, giving the ball back to A&M with 3:35 to go in the half. Spurred on by a 21-yard pass to senior WR Malcome Kennedy, the Aggies made a quick 2 minute, 19 second drive for another TD by Tra Carson, putting the game at 31-14. South Carolina’s final drive of the half was highlighted by two big defensive plays from A&M. The first was a big hit from freshman safety Armani Watts to dislodge a touchdown pass on 2nd-and-10, followed directly by an 11-yard sack from freshman DE Myles Garrett. Facing a 4th-and-21, Carolina attempted and missed a 54-yard Field Goal.

The Gamecocks opened the second half with a 3-and-out, after which Texas A&M gained 66 yards on just 8 plays (highlighted by a 21-yard grab by freshman Speedy Noil), before a 5-yard catch from Josh Reynolds added A&M’s 5th touchdown of the game, making it 38-14. On the first play of South Carolina’s next drive, QB Dylan Thompson carried the ball for 6 yards, at which time Aggie redshirt sophomore LB A.J. Hilliard dislocated his ankle, forcing him out for the rest of the season. The Gamecocks would go on to score with a 5-yard TD toss to Pharoh Cooper, cutting into the A&M lead 38-21. With time running short, South Carolina attempted an onside kick, but it was A&M who recovered. Texas A&M’s offense could not be stopped, and they added another touchdown behind Tra Carson on a 3-yard run, extending their lead to 45-21. The Gamecocks answered once again, with two 27-yard passes to Jerell Adams and Pharoh Cooper respectively, before adding a touchdown with a 10-yard pass to Nick Jones to make it 45-28. Texas A&M’s ensuing possession ended in a punt (their first since the 1st quarter), but South Carolina could not capitalize, as their drive was cut short with and interception by Aggie safety Armani Watts.

The fourth quarter proved much less eventful than the previous three. The Aggies, after a 33-yard pass to Malcome Kennedy, scored to open the quarter, with a 2-yard run from Trey Williams. South Carolina gained 48 yards on their next drive, before failing to convert a 4th-and-10, turning the ball over to A&M with 10:05 left in the game. Possession never changed again, and the Aggies made it to the South Carolina 3 yard line before kneeling the ball to end the game.

=== Lamar ===
#9 Texas A&M Aggies vs Lamar Cardinals – Game summary

Quarter	1	2	3	4	Total
Lamar	3	0	0	0	3
#9 Texas A&M	21	10	14	28	73

at Kyle Field • College Station, TX

- Date: September 6, 2014
- Game time: 8:44 p.m. CST
- Game weather: 83 °F (28 °C), Cloudy with light rain, winds SE at 15 mph (24 km/h)
- Game attendance: 104,728
- Referee: Jason Autrey
- TV announcers (SECN): Dave Baker (play-by-play), Greg McElroy (commentary), and Niki Noto (sideline reporter)
- Sources:
  - Official Texas A&M Game Notes (PDF)

Game information

First Quarter

- A&M – Trey Williams 33-yard run (Josh Lambo Kick), 13:18 (A&M 7–0)
- LAM – Josh Davis 20-yard Field Goal, 8:00 (A&M 7–3)
- A&M – Ricky Seals-Jones 24-yard pass from Kenny Hill (Josh Lambo Kick), 5:55 (A&M 14–3)
- A&M – Sabian Holmes 51-yard pass from Kenny Hill (Josh Lambo Kick), 2:15 (A&M 21–3)

Second Quarter

- A&M – Josh Lambo 20-yard Field Goal, 14:41 (A&M 24–3)
- A&M – Edward Pope 9-yard pass from Kenny Hill (Josh Lambo Kick), 7:48 (A&M 31–3)

Third Quarter

- A&M – Malcome Kennedy 18-yard pass from Kenny Hill (Josh Lambo Kick), 13:16 (A&M 38–3)
- A&M – James White 1-yard run (Josh Lambo Kick), 7:13 (A&M 45–3)

Fourth Quarter

- A&M – James White 3-yard run (Josh Lambo Kick), 12:51 (A&M 52–3)
- A&M – Boone Niederhofer 2-yard pass from Kyle Allen (Josh Lambo Kick), 8:33 (A&M 59–3)
- A&M – LaQuvionte Gonzalez 33-yard pass from Kyle Allen (Josh Lambo Kick), 5:30 (A&M 66–3)
- A&M – Brice Dolezal 41-yard run (Josh Lambo Kick), 1:26 (A&M 73–3)

Top Passers

- LAM – Caleb Berry; 16/42, 153 yards, 1 INT
- A&M – Kenny Hill; 17/26, 283 yards, 4 TD

Top Rushers

- LAM – Carl Harris; 18 carries, 51 yards (2.8 avg.)
- A&M – Brice Dolezal; 11 carries, 86 yards (7.8 avg.), 1 TD

Top Receiving

- LAM – Michael Handy; 5 receptions, 62 yards (12.4 avg.)
- A&M – Sabian Holmes; 3 receptions, 75 yards (25.0 avg.), 1 TD

=== Rice ===
Rice at #7 Texas A&M

Team	1	2	3	4	Total
Owls	0	7	3	0	10
• #7 Aggies	7	14	14	3	38

- Date: September 13
- Location: College Station, Texas (Kyle Field)
- Game start: 8:09 p.m. CST
- Elapsed time: 3:39
- Game attendance: 103,867
- Game weather: 69 °F (21 °C), Cloudy and cool, winds N at 12 mph (19 km/h)
- Referee: Penn Wagers
- TV announcers (ESPN2): Mark Jones (play-by-play), Rod Gilmore (commentary), and Jessica Mendoza (sideline reporter)
- Sources:
- Official Texas A&M Game Notes (PDF)

Scoring summary
1	3:36	TAMU	Speedy Noil 14-yard pass from Kenny Hill (Josh Lambo kick)	TAMU 7–0
2	13:44	TAMU	Ricky Seals-Jones 13-yard pass from Kenny Hill (Josh Lambo kick)	TAMU 14–0
2	11:59	Rice	Mario Hull 35-yard pass from Driphus Jackson (James Hairston Kick)	TAMU 14–7
2	3:30	TAMU	Josh Reynolds 48-yard pass from Kenny Hill (Josh Lambo Kick)	TAMU 21–7
3	13:26	TAMU	Josh Reynolds 20-yard pass from Kenny Hill (Josh Lambo Kick)	TAMU 28–7
3	5:24	TAMU	Tra Carson 1-yard run (Josh Lambo Kick)	TAMU 35–7
3	0:39	Rice	James Hairston 33-yard Field Goal	TAMU 35–10
4	14:44	TAMU	Josh Lambo 47-yard Field Goal	TAMU 38–10

=== SMU ===
#6 Texas A&M at SMU

Team	1	2	3	4	Total
• #6 Aggies	17	21	10	10	58
Mustangs	0	3	0	3	6

- Date: September 20
- Location: Dallas, Texas (Gerald J. Ford Stadium)
- Game start: 2:36 CST
- Elapsed time: 3:14
- Game attendance: 34,820
- Game weather: 88 °F (31 °C), Cloudy, winds SE at 9 mph (14 km/h)
- Referee: Matt Loeffler
- TV announcers (ABC/ESPN2): Mike Patrick (play-by-play), Ed Cunningham (commentary), and Jeannine Edwards (Sideline Reporter)
- Sources:
- Official Texas A&M Game Notes (PDF)

Scoring summary
1	11:54	TAMU	Josh Lambo 39-yard Field Goal	TAMU 3–0
1	5:12	TAMU	Trey Williams 8-yard run (Josh Lambo Kick)	TAMU 10–0
1	1:15	TAMU	Jeremy Tabuyo 30-yard pass from Kenny Hill (Josh Lambo Kick)	TAMU 17–0
2	12:43	TAMU	Trey Williams 5-yard run (Josh Lambo Kick)	TAMU 24–0
2	9:26	TAMU	Brandon Williams 10-yard run (Josh Lambo Kick)	TAMU 31–0
2	1:36	SMU	Cody Rademacher 29-yard Field Goal	TAMU 31–3
2	0:21	TAMU	Josh Reynolds 70-yard pass from Kenny Hill (Josh Lambo Kick)	TAMU 38–3
3	9:40	TAMU	Josh Lambo 50-yard Field Goal	TAMU 41–3
3	5:47	TAMU	Jeremy Tabuyo 50-yard pass from Kyle Allen (Josh Lambo Kick)	TAMU 48–3
4	12:55	TAMU	Josh Lambo 24-yard Field Goal	TAMU 51–3
4	7:55	SMU	Cody Rademacher 37-yard Field Goal	TAMU 51–6
4	4:01	TAMU	James White 8-yard run (Josh Lambo Kick)	TAMU 58–6

Just before halftime, SMU wide receiver Der'rikk Thompson ran out of bound after an overthrown pass and nearly ran into the Texas A&M mascot Reveille, but was knocked aside by Texas A&M Corps of Cadets member Ryan Kreider, the "Mascot Corporal". This made news headlines across the nation about the dedication of the Mascot Handlers to protect Reveille.

=== Arkansas ===
Arkansas at No. 6 Texas A&M

Team	1	2	3	4	OT	Total
Razorbacks	7	14	7	0	0	28
• #6 Aggies	7	7	0	14	7	35

- Date: September 27
- Location: Arlington, Texas (AT&T Stadium)
- Game start: 2:40 p.m. CST
- Elapsed time: 3:44
- Game attendance: 68,113
- Game weather: Indoors
- Referee: Tom Ritter
- TV announcers (CBS): Verne Lundquist (play-by-play), Gary Danielson (commentary), and Allie LaForce (sideline reporter)
- Sources:
- Official Texas A&M Game Notes (PDF)

Scoring summary
1	13:55	TAMU	Brandon Williams 13-yard run (Josh Lambo Kick)	TAMU 7–0
1	9:06	Ark	Jonathan Williams 9-yard run (John Henson Kick)	Tied 7–7
2	13:21	Ark	Alex Collins 50-yard run (John Henson Kick)	Arkansas 14–7
2	10:06	TAMU	Edward Pope 8-yard pass from Kenny Hill (Josh Lambo Kick)	Tied 14–14
2	1:03	Ark	Sam Irwin-Hill 51-yard run (John Henson Kick)	Arkansas 21–14
3	5:02	Ark	AJ Derby 44-yard pass from Brandon Allen (John Henson Kick)	Arkansas 28–14
4	11:59	TAMU	Edward Pope 86-yard pass from Kenny Hill (Josh Lambo Kick)	Arkansas 28–21
4	2:08	TAMU	Josh Reynolds 59-yard pass from Kenny Hill (Josh Lambo Kick)	Tied 28–28
OT	--:--	TAMU	Malcome Kennedy 25-yard pass from Kenny Hill (Josh Lambo Kick)	TAMU 35–28

The Aggies scored a touchdown and an extra point in the first minute of the game, but the Razorbacks quickly overtook them, maintaining a lead that remained unbroken until the Aggies scored in overtime. The Aggies lagged for much of the game but made a comeback in the final quarter, sending the game into overtime with a score of 28–28. The Aggies lost the coin toss and went on offense. They quickly scored a touchdown and an extra point. The Razorbacks, shut down by the Aggies' defense, were unable to gain the 25 yards necessary for a touchdown that would have sent it into another overtime. The Aggies won with a final score of 35–28.

=== #12 Mississippi State ===
	1	2	3	4	Total
#6 Aggies	7	3	7	14	31
#12 Bulldogs	14	14	13	7	48

It was by far the biggest test for the Aggies that season at Davis Wade Stadium. A&M scored quickly on their first drive but, were out scored the rest of the game.

=== #3 Ole Miss ===
	1	2	3	4	Total
#3 Rebels	14	7	7	7	35
#14 Aggies	0	0	7	13	20

=== #7 Alabama ===
	1	2	3	4	Total
#21 Aggies	0	0	0	0	0
#7 Crimson Tide	10	35	7	7	59

After Texas A&M's 59-0 shutout loss to Alabama, the Aggies were unranked in the AP poll for the first time since October 6, 2012.

=== Louisiana-Monroe ===
	1	2	3	4	Total
Warhawks	0	10	0	6	16
Aggies	7	14	0	0	21

=== Auburn ===
	1	2	3	4	Total
Aggies	14	21	3	3	41
No. 3 Tigers	14	3	7	14	38

The Aggies came into Jordan–Hare Stadium as huge underdogs against number 3 Auburn. The first two drives on offense the Aggies were up, 14–0. Auburn scored quickly to tie the game, only to have the Aggies score two more touchdowns to go up 28–14. With a few seconds left Auburn's kicker Daniel Carlson attempted a field goal but had it blocked and returned for a score for the Aggies. In the second half Auburn tried to make another miracle comeback with three touchdowns to trail by 3. Two fumbles late in the game cost Auburn and the Aggies won, 41–38. This loss ended A&M's three-game losing streak in SEC play, and Auburn's 13-home-game winning streak, along with ending a playoff berth. Auburn fell to 9th while the Aggies returned to the top 25.

=== Missouri ===
	1	2	3	4	Total
Tigers	3	3	28	0	34
#24 Aggies	3	10	7	7	27

=== LSU ===
	1	2	3	4	Total
Tigers	0	17	3	3	23
Aggies	7	0	0	10	17

=== West Virginia–Liberty Bowl ===
	1	2	3	4	Total
Aggies	14	14	17	0	45
Mountaineers	20	7	3	7	37

== Rankings ==
Ranking movements Legend: ██ Increase in ranking ██ Decrease in ranking — = Not ranked RV = Received votes ( ) = First-place votes
	Week																
Poll	Pre	1	2	3	4	5	6	7	8	9	10	11	12	13	14	15	Final
AP	21	9 (2)	7 (2)	6 (3)	6 (4)	6	14	21	RV	—	RV	RV	RV	RV	—	—	RV
Coaches	20	13	8	7	7	7	14	21	—	RV	—	RV	RV	RV	—	—	RV
CFP	Not released									—	—	24	—	—	—	—	Not released
