= Jarvis Harrison =

American gridiron football player (born 1991)

No. 60, 64
- Position: Offensive guard

Personal information
- Born: December 25, 1991 (age 34); Navasota, Texas, U.S.
- Listed height: 6 ft 4 in (1.93 m)
- Listed weight: 344 lb (156 kg)

Career information
- High school: Navasota (TX)
- College: Texas A&M
- NFL draft: 2015: 5th round, 152nd overall pick

Career history
- New York Jets (2015); Tampa Bay Buccaneers (2017)*; Saskatchewan Roughriders (2017–2018); Montreal Alouettes (2019)*
- * Offseason or practice squad member only
- Stats at Pro Football Reference
- Stats at CFL.ca

Jarvis Harrison (born December 25, 1991) is an American former professional football player who was an offensive guard in the National Football League (NFL) and Canadian Football League (CFL). He played college football at Texas A&M, and was drafted by the New York Jets in the fifth round in the 2015 NFL draft.

== Early life ==
A native of Navasota, Texas, Harrison attended Navasota High School, where played just two seasons of football for the Rattlers. In his junior year, Harrison helped Navasota to a 10–1 record and a berth to the UIL Region III-3A Division I final, which the Rattlers lost 28–34 in overtime to La Vega.

Harrison received little attention as a football recruit, being rated only a two-star prospect by Rivals.com. Harrison had offers from Baylor and Southern Miss, but decided to hold out for an offer from Texas A&M, which came about two weeks after National Signing Day.

== College career ==
After redshirting his initial year at Texas A&M, Harrison served as the top backup on the offensive line for the Aggies. He saw action in 11 games of the 2011 season, and started four games in October against Texas Tech, Baylor, Iowa State, and Missouri, replacing the injured Cedric Ogbuehi at right guard. Harrison got another start against Northwestern in the Meineke Car Care Bowl of Texas at left guard in place of the injured Brian Thomas. As a sophomore, Harrison started all 13 games at guard. As part of an offensive line that also featured Ogbuehi, Luke Joeckel, and Jake Matthews, Harrison helped the Aggies to lead the Southeastern Conference (SEC) in all rushing, passing, scoring and total offense. Quarterback Johnny Manziel won the Heisman Trophy after the season.

In his junior season, Harrison remained a cornerstone on the offensive line, starting all 13 games. The 2013 Aggies were one of only three teams to rank in the top 10 nationally in scoring, passing and total offense. Harrison injured his calf in the Chick-fil-A Bowl against Duke, and also underwent surgery to repair torn labrum in his right shoulder in January 2014. He missed the first two games of the 2014 season due to slow recovery from this surgery, but eventually played in the final ten games and re-earned his starting spot for the last seven. Harrison made five starts at his usual left guard spot, but was moved outside to left tackle against Auburn and Missouri to replace an injured Germain Ifedi. Providing protection for quarterbacks Kenny Hill and Kyle Allen, the offensive line helped turn the Aggies into the SEC's top passing attack, which led the conference in passing yards and touchdowns.

== Professional career ==
=== New York Jets ===
Harrison was drafted by the New York Jets in the fifth round (152nd overall) of the 2015 NFL draft. He signed a four-year, $2.5 million contract on May 6, 2015. He was waived on November 7, 2015, re-signed by the Jets and placed on their practice squad on November 11. On August 28, 2016, Harrison was waived by the Jets.

=== Tampa Bay Buccaneers ===
On January 5, 2017, Harrison signed a reserve/future contract with the Tampa Bay Buccaneers. He was waived on September 2, 2017.

=== Saskatchewan Roughriders ===
Harrison signed unto the practice roster of the Saskatchewan Roughriders of the Canadian Football League (CFL) in September 2017. On February 22, 2018, Harrison was re-signed by the Riders.

=== Montreal Alouettes ===
Harrison was signed by the Montreal Alouettes of the CFL on March 7, 2019. He was released on June 8, 2019.
