= Germain Ifedi =

American football player (born 1994)

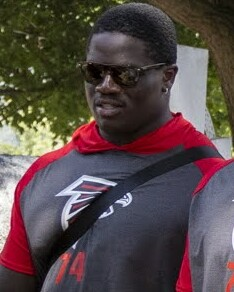
- Ifedi with the Atlanta Falcons in 2022

Profile
- Position: Offensive tackle

Personal information
- Born: June 2, 1994 (age 32); Houston, Texas, U.S.
- Listed height: 6 ft 5 in (1.96 m)
- Listed weight: 325 lb (147 kg)

Career information
- High school: Westside (Houston)
- College: Texas A&M (2012–2015)
- NFL draft: 2016: 1st round, 31st overall pick

Career history
- Seattle Seahawks (2016–2019); Chicago Bears (2020–2021); Atlanta Falcons (2022); Detroit Lions (2023)*; Buffalo Bills (2023); Cleveland Browns (2024); Miami Dolphins (2025)
- * Offseason or practice squad member only

Awards and highlights
- Freshman All-American (2013); Second-team All-SEC (2015)

Career NFL statistics as of 2025
- Games played: 117
- Games started: 90
- Stats at Pro Football Reference

Germain Ifedi (born June 2, 1994) is an American professional football offensive tackle. He played college football for the Texas A&M Aggies and was selected by the Seattle Seahawks in the first round of the 2016 NFL draft.

== Early life ==
A native of Houston, Ifedi attended Westside High School, where he was a three-sport athlete in football, basketball, and track. He earned second-team All-State honors by the Associated Press. He recorded 96 pancake blocks as a senior, and also blocked a kick. The Westside Wolves went 10–4 on the season, losing the UIL 5A Division II Regional Final to Dekaney, which were led by running back Trey Williams. Regarded a four-star recruit by 247Sports and ESPN, Ifedi was listed the No. 13 offensive guard prospect in his class.

== College career ==
After redshirting in his first year at Texas A&M, Ifedi started at right guard all 13 season games on the offensive line in 2013. The Aggies offensive line, that also included tackles Jake Matthews and Cedric Ogbuehi, blocked for an offense that ranked in the top 10 nationally in scoring, passing and total offense. Quarterback Johnny Manziel completed 69 percent of his passes over the season, for 4,114 yards and 37 touchdowns, and lead the team in rushing yards with 759. After the season, Ifedi was named Freshman All-American by Sporting News.

In his sophomore season, Ifedi replaced Ogbuehi at right tackle (after Ogbuehi had to replace Matthews at left tackle). Ifedi started all but two games of the season, missing the Auburn and Missouri games due to a sprained knee suffered against Louisiana–Monroe. The Aggies offensive line allowed only 27 sacks (2.1 per game), while quarterbacks Kenny Hill and Kyle Allen attempted a combined 514 passes (39.5 per game), leading the Southeastern Conference in passing yards and touchdowns per game.

== Professional career ==
Pre-draft measurables
Height	Weight	Arm length	Hand span	40-yard dash	10-yard split	20-yard split	20-yard shuttle	Vertical jump	Broad jump	Bench press
6 ft 5 3/4 in (1.97 m)	324 lb (147 kg)	36 in (0.91 m)	10 3/4 in (0.27 m)	5.27 s	1.80 s	3.04 s	4.75 s	32.5 in (0.83 m)	9 ft 1 in (2.77 m)	24 reps
Values from NFL Combine

=== Seattle Seahawks ===
Ifedi was selected in the first round with the 31st overall pick by the Seattle Seahawks. He became the fourth consecutive Texas A&M Aggies offensive lineman selected in the first round of an NFL Draft, after Luke Joeckel (2013), Jake Matthews (2014), and Cedric Ogbuehi (2015).

On May 6, 2016, Ifedi signed a four-year deal worth $8.27 million overall with a $4.2 million signing bonus. Ifedi made his first career start and NFL debut on October 2, 2016, against the New York Jets in Week 4 after missing September due to an ankle injury. As a rookie, he appeared in and started 13 regular season games and both of the Seahawks' playoff games.

Ifedi entered his second season in 2017 as the Seahawks starting right tackle, starting in all 16 games. Ifedi led the league in penalties with 16.

In the 2018 season, Ifedi appeared in and started 15 regular season games and the Seahawks' one playoff game.

On May 3, 2019, the Seahawks declined the fifth-year option on Ifedi's contract, making him a free agent in 2020. In the 2019 season, he appeared in and started all 16 regular season games and both of the Seahawks' playoff games.

=== Chicago Bears ===
On April 1, 2020, Ifedi signed with the Chicago Bears on a one-year deal. He was placed on the reserve/COVID-19 list by the team on November 3, 2020, and activated three days later. He started in all 16 games for the Bears in 2020, 10 at right guard and six at right tackle.

On April 1, 2021, Ifedi re-signed with the Bears. He suffered a knee injury in Week 5 and was placed on injured reserve on October 13. He was activated on December 20. In the 2021 season, he appeared in nine games and started two.

=== Atlanta Falcons ===
On April 6, 2022, Ifedi signed a one-year contract with the Atlanta Falcons. In the 2022 season, he appeared in all 17 games for Atlanta, mainly in a special teams role. Ifedi re-signed with the team on March 22, 2023. He was released by Atlanta on May 16.

=== Detroit Lions ===
On May 23, 2023, Ifedi signed with the Detroit Lions. He was released on August 27.

=== Buffalo Bills ===
On August 30, 2023, Ifedi signed with the Buffalo Bills. He was released on December 28 and re-signed to the practice squad two days later. Ifedi was not signed to a reserve/future contract after the season and thus became a free agent when his practice squad contract expired.

=== Cleveland Browns ===
On April 18, 2024, Ifedi signed with the Cleveland Browns. He was released on August 27, and re-signed to the practice squad. Ifedi was promoted to the active roster on September 25.

=== Miami Dolphins ===
On August 3, 2025, Ifedi signed with the Miami Dolphins. He was placed on season-ending injured reserve on August 14, due to a triceps tear.

== Personal life ==
Ifedi's parents are Nigerian immigrants. Ifedi is a member of the Pi Omicron chapter of Alpha Phi Alpha. His older brother, Martin Ifedi, played defensive end for the Memphis Tigers. His eldest brother, Benedict Ifedi, is a Primary Care-Sports Medicine Physician in Katy, Texas.

At Texas A&M, Ifedi majored in construction science. He interned with Manhattan-Vaughn Construction in 2015, the joint venture which renovated Kyle Field.
