= 2014 Liberty Bowl =

2014 AutoZone Liberty Bowl
- 56th Liberty Bowl
| Texas A&M Aggies | West Virginia Mountaineers |
| (7–5) | (7–5) |
| SEC | Big 12 |
| 45 | 37 |
| Head coach: Kevin Sumlin | Head coach: Dana Holgorsen |
| | 1 | 2 | 3 | 4 | Total |
|---|---|---|---|---|---|
| Texas A&M | 14 | 14 | 17 | 0 | 45 |
| West Virginia | 20 | 7 | 3 | 7 | 37 |
- Date: December 29, 2014
- Season: 2014
- Stadium: Liberty Bowl Memorial Stadium
- Location: Memphis, Tennessee
- MVP: Texas A&M QB Kyle Allen
- Favorite: West Virginia by 3
- Referee: Walter Davenport (ACC)
- Halftime show: Big & Rich
- Attendance: 51,282

United States TV coverage
- Network: ESPN/ESPN Radio
- Announcers: Clay Matvick, Anthony Becht, & Dawn Davenport (ESPN); Mark Neely, Ray Bentley, & Niki Noto (ESPN Radio)

The 2014 Liberty Bowl was an American college football bowl game played on December 29, 2014, at Liberty Bowl Memorial Stadium in Memphis, Tennessee. The 56th edition of the Liberty Bowl featured the Texas A&M Aggies of the Southeastern Conference and the West Virginia Mountaineers of the Big 12 Conference. It began at 1:00 p.m. CST and aired on ESPN. It was one of the 2014–15 bowl games that concluded the 2014 FBS football season. Sponsored by automobile parts and accessories store AutoZone, it was officially known as the AutoZone Liberty Bowl.

== Teams ==
This was the first meeting between these two teams. This was the 2nd Liberty Bowl appearance for both schools, Texas A&M's first was in 1975 and West Virginia's was in 1964. This was the first for Texas A&M as a member of the SEC and the first for West Virginia as a member of the Big 12.

== Game summary ==
=== Scoring summary ===
Scoring summary

| Quarter | Time | Drive | | | Team | Scoring information | Score | |
| Quarter | Time | Plays | Yards | TOP | Team | Scoring information | TA&M | WVU |
|---|---|---|---|---|---|---|---|---|
| 1 | 11:55 | 1 | 44 | 0:09 | TA&M | Josh Reynolds 44-yard touchdown reception from Kyle Allen, Josh Lambo kick good | 7 | 0 |
| 1 | 7:49 | 10 | 56 | 4:06 | WVU | 32-yard field goal by Josh Lambert | 7 | 3 |
| 1 | 5:12 | 5 | 58 | 1:32 | WVU | Mario Alford 45-yard touchdown reception from Skyler Howard, Josh Lambert kick good | 7 | 10 |
| 1 | 4:54 | – | – | – | WVU | Interception returned 35 yards for touchdown by K. J. Dillon, Josh Lambert kick good | 7 | 17 |
| 1 | 1:28 | 11 | 89 | 3:26 | TA&M | Trey Williams 40-yard touchdown reception from Kyle Allen, Josh Lambo kick good | 14 | 17 |
| 1 | 0:00 | 6 | 66 | 1:28 | WVU | 40-yard field goal by Josh Lambert | 14 | 20 |
| 2 | 12:35 | 6 | 60 | 2:25 | TA&M | Malcome Kennedy 11-yard touchdown reception from Kyle Allen, Josh Lambo kick good | 21 | 20 |
| 2 | 11:56 | 2 | 52 | 0:39 | WVU | Kevin White 49-yard touchdown reception from Skyler Howard, Josh Lambert kick good | 21 | 27 |
| 2 | 0:53 | 12 | 90 | 3:24 | TA&M | Kyle Allen 14-yard touchdown run, Josh Lambo kick good | 28 | 27 |
| 3 | 11:33 | 7 | 57 | 2:27 | TA&M | 26-yard field goal by Josh Lambo | 31 | 27 |
| 3 | 7:44 | 6 | 54 | 2:46 | TA&M | Trey Williams 18-yard touchdown run, Josh Lambo kick good | 38 | 27 |
| 3 | 5:10 | 10 | 62 | 2:34 | WVU | 31-yard field goal by Josh Lambert | 38 | 30 |
| 3 | 0:22 | 11 | 73 | 4:48 | TA&M | Malcome Kennedy 9-yard touchdown reception from Kyle Allen, Josh Lambo kick good | 45 | 30 |
| 4 | 2:32 | 9 | 91 | 1:47 | WVU | Elijah Wellman 4-yard touchdown reception from Skyler Howard, Josh Lambert kick good | 45 | 37 |
| "TOP" = time of possession. For other American football terms, see Glossary of American football. | | | | | | | 45 | 37 |

=== Statistics ===
| Statistics | TA&M | WVU |
|---|---|---|
| First downs | 28 | 21 |
| Plays–yards | 83–529 | 71–472 |
| Rushes–yards | 48–235 | 32–126 |
| Passing yards | 294 | 346 |
| Passing: Comp–Att–Int | 22–35–1 | 20–45–0 |
| Time of possession | 33:38 | 26:22 |
