= Marcus Murphy =

American football player (born 1991)

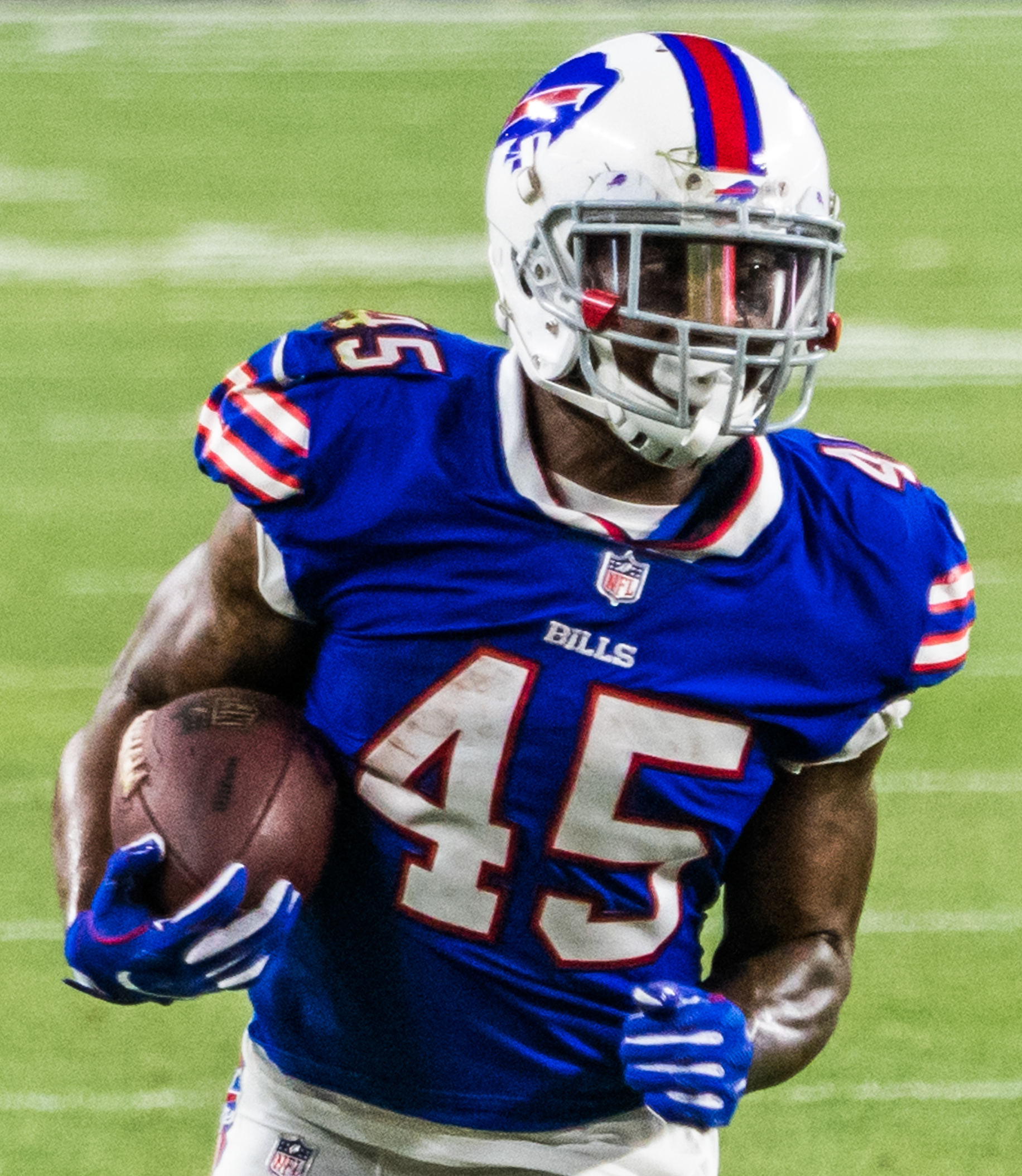
- Murphy with the Buffalo Bills in 2018

No. 23, 45
- Position: Running back

Personal information
- Born: October 3, 1991 (age 35); DeSoto, Texas, U.S.
- Listed height: 5 ft 8 in (1.73 m)
- Listed weight: 195 lb (88 kg)

Career information
- High school: DeSoto
- College: Missouri
- NFL draft: 2015: 7th round, 230th overall pick

Career history
- New Orleans Saints (2015–2016); New York Jets (2017)*; Indianapolis Colts (2017)*; Buffalo Bills (2017–2018); Carolina Panthers (2020)*; Saskatchewan Roughriders (2021)
- * Offseason or practice squad member only

Awards and highlights
- SEC Special Teams Player of the Year (2014); First-team All-SEC (2014); Second-team All-SEC (2013)

Career NFL statistics
- Rushing attempts: 60
- Rushing yards: 291
- Receptions: 14
- Receiving yards: 36
- Return yards: 1,080
- Total touchdowns: 1
- Stats at Pro Football Reference

Marcus Murphy (born October 3, 1991) is an American former professional football player who was a running back and return specialist in the National Football League (NFL). He played college football for the Missouri Tigers. While at Missouri, he was named as a first-team All-SEC selection in 2014. He was selected by the New Orleans Saints in the seventh round of the 2015 NFL draft.

== Early life ==
Murphy attended and played football for the Eagles at DeSoto High School.

== College career ==
Murphy attended and played college football at the University of Missouri from 2010 to 2014. In the 2010 season, he had 22 carries for 181 rushing yards and two rushing touchdowns. He used a redshirt in the 2011 season due to a right shoulder injury. In the 2012 season, Missouri's first in the Southeastern Conference (SEC), he had 46 carries for 251 rushing yards and one rushing touchdown. In addition, he had three punt return touchdowns, which led the NCAA. In the 2013 season, he had 92 carries for 601 rushing yards and nine rushing touchdowns. In the 2014 season, he had 177 carries for 924 rushing yards and four rushing touchdowns. In addition, he had two kickoff return touchdowns, which led the NCAA.

== Professional career ==
=== New Orleans Saints ===
Murphy was selected by the New Orleans Saints in the seventh round, 230th overall, of the 2015 NFL draft. He was mainly used on special teams, where he returned a punt for a touchdown in a Week 3 game against the NFC South division rival Carolina Panthers. He appeared in three games and handled some return duties in the 2016 season for the Saints.

On July 26, 2017, Murphy was waived by the Saints.

=== New York Jets ===
On July 27, 2017, Murphy was claimed off waivers by the New York Jets. On September 3, 2017, he was waived by the Jets and was signed to the practice squad the next day. He was released on October 3, 2017.

=== Indianapolis Colts ===
On October 9, 2017, Murphy was signed to the Indianapolis Colts' practice squad. He was released on October 24, 2017.

=== Buffalo Bills ===
On November 6, 2017, Murphy was signed to the Buffalo Bills' practice squad. He was promoted to the active roster on December 26, 2017. In Week 17, he made his Bills debut and had seven carries for 41 rushing yards and two receptions for seven yards against the Miami Dolphins.

In Week 10 of the 2018 season, Murphy had 14 carries for 69 yards in a 41–10 win against the New York Jets. He suffered a dislocated elbow in Week 15 and was placed on injured reserve on December 18, 2018. He finished the 2018 season with 52 carries for 250 rushing yards. On August 31, 2019, Murphy was waived by the Bills.

=== Carolina Panthers ===
Murphy signed a reserve/futures contract with the Panthers on December 30, 2019. He was waived on May 2, 2020.

=== Saskatchewan Roughriders ===
Murphy signed with the Saskatchewan Roughriders of the Canadian Football League on June 7, 2021. He was released on December 6, 2021.
