= Drew Kaser =

American football player (born 1993)

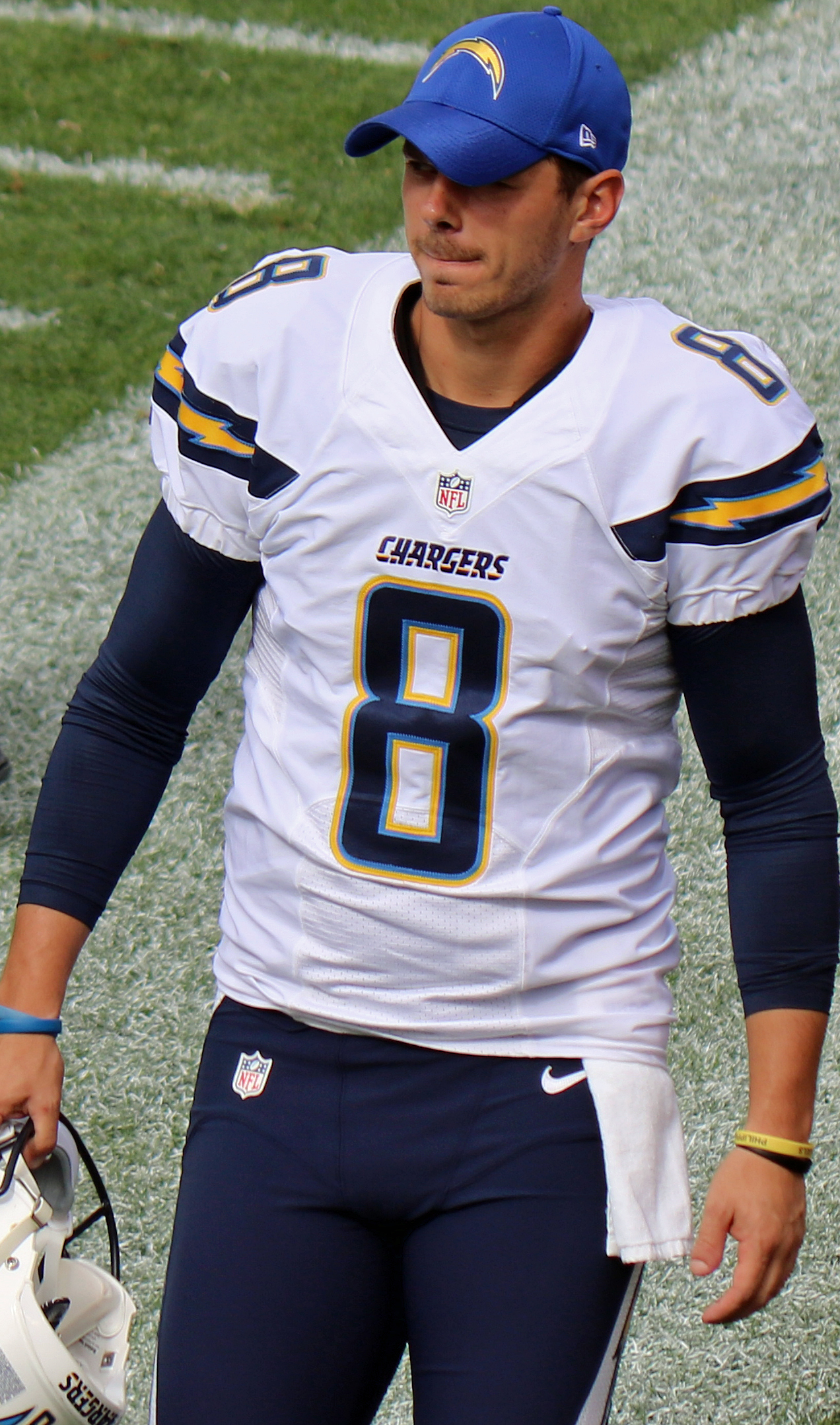
- Kaser with the San Diego Chargers in 2016

No. 8
- Position: Punter

Personal information
- Born: February 11, 1993 (age 33); Strongsville, Ohio, U.S.
- Listed height: 6 ft 2 in (1.88 m)
- Listed weight: 206 lb (93 kg)

Career information
- High school: Walsh Jesuit (Cuyahoga Falls, Ohio)
- College: Texas A&M
- NFL draft: 2016: 6th round, 179th overall pick

Career history
- San Diego / Los Angeles Chargers (2016–2018); Green Bay Packers (2018); Oakland Raiders (2019)*; Green Bay Packers (2020); San Francisco 49ers (2020)*
- * Offseason or practice squad member only

Awards and highlights
- First-team All-American (2013); Second-team All-American (2015); 2× First-team All-SEC (2013, 2015)

Career NFL statistics
- Punts: 146
- Punting yards: 6,918
- Average punt: 47.4
- Inside 20: 50
- Stats at Pro Football Reference

Andrew James Kaser (born February 11, 1993) is an American former professional football player who was a punter in the National Football League (NFL). He played college football for the Texas A&M Aggies, twice earning All-American honors. He was selected by the San Diego Chargers in the sixth round of the 2016 NFL draft.

== College career ==
In Kaser's first season with the Texas A&M Aggies, he played in only one game, punting twice. Kaser was then redshirted the next year and returned to the field the following year.

As a redshirt sophomore in 2013, Kaser was a finalist for the Ray Guy Award, given annually to the best collegiate punter. Kaser was also named 2013 Sporting News All-American and first-team All-Southeastern Conference (SEC) punter. He led the SEC with an average punt at 47.4 yards, breaking the old school record of 47.0 yards held by Shane Lechler. Kaser kicked his longest punt of the season for 76 yards against Rice University. Kaser would later be named special teams MVP at the Aggies annual banquet.

In 2014, his junior year, Kaser was ranked No. 11 in the nation and No. 3 in the SEC, averaging 44.5 yards a punt on 56 punts, with 15 punts over 50 yards. Kaser also earned National Punter of the Week after averaging 54.7 yards on three punts in A&M's victory over Auburn. Kaser had a career-high four punts downed inside the opponent 20-yard line against Mississippi State and Louisiana-Monroe.

== Professional career ==
=== San Diego / Los Angeles Chargers ===
The San Diego Chargers selected Kaser in the sixth round (179th overall) of the 2016 NFL draft.

On October 2, 2018, Kaser was waived by the Chargers after the team signed Donnie Jones.

=== Green Bay Packers (first stint) ===
On November 3, 2018, Kaser was signed by the Green Bay Packers as an emergency option in case J. K. Scott needed to leave for the birth of his first child. The Packers then released Kaser on November 5 to make room on the roster for Ibraheim Campbell.

=== Oakland Raiders ===
On January 1, 2019, Kaser signed a reserve/future contract with the Oakland Raiders. He was released on May 6, 2019.

=== Green Bay Packers (second stint) ===
On November 21, 2020, Kaser was signed to the Packers active roster, and was waived two days later.

=== San Francisco 49ers ===
On January 2, 2021, Kaser was signed to the practice squad of the San Francisco 49ers. He was released two days later.
