= Kyle Allen (American football) =

American football player (born 1996)

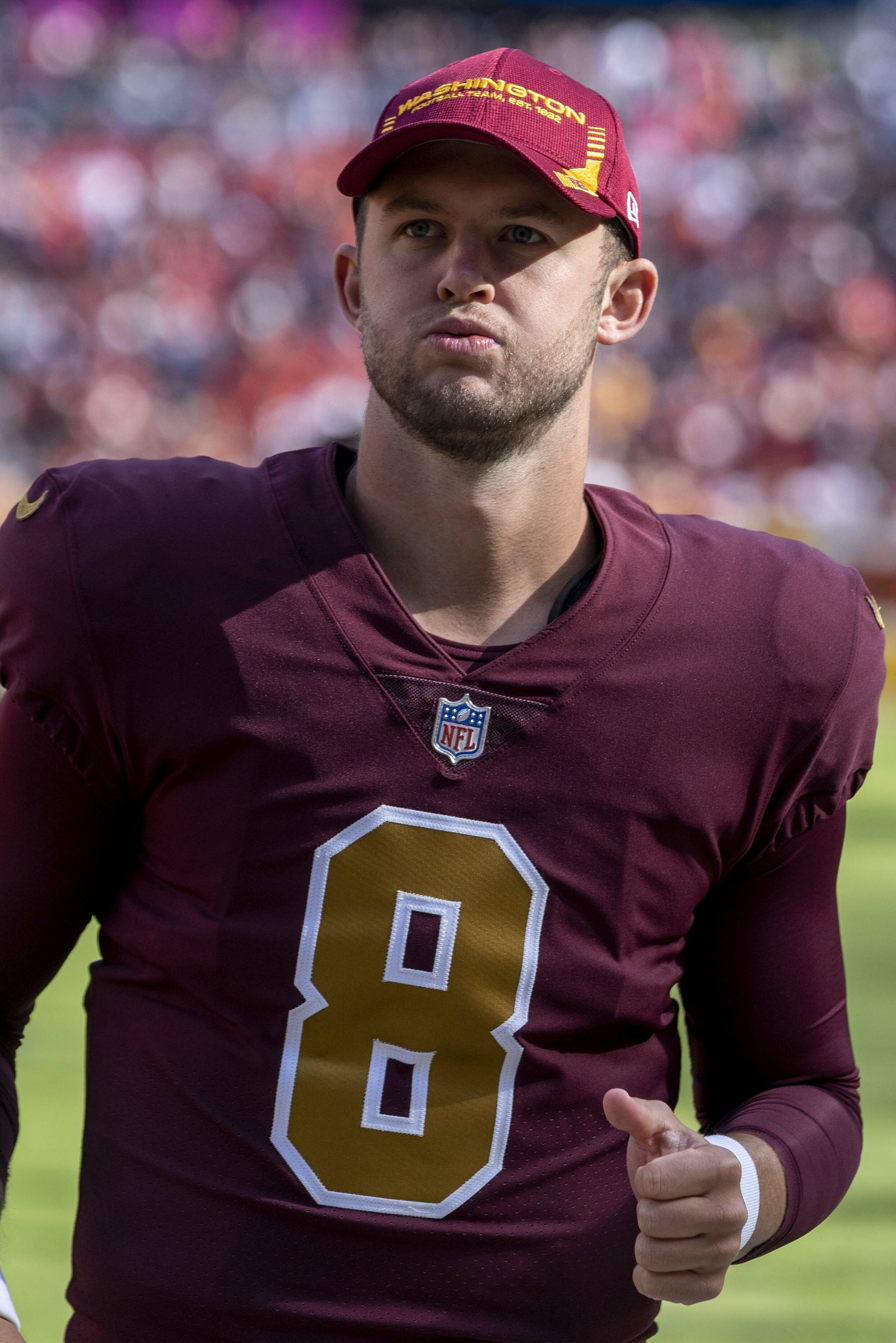
- Allen with the Washington Football Team in 2021

No. 11 – Buffalo Bills
- Position: Quarterback
- Roster status: Active

Personal information
- Born: March 8, 1996 (age 30); Scottsdale, Arizona, U.S.
- Listed height: 6 ft 3 in (1.91 m)
- Listed weight: 210 lb (95 kg)

Career information
- High school: Desert Mountain (Scottsdale)
- College: Texas A&M (2014–2015); Houston (2016–2017)
- NFL draft: 2018: undrafted

Career history
- Carolina Panthers (2018–2019); Washington Football Team (2020–2021); Houston Texans (2022); Buffalo Bills (2023); Pittsburgh Steelers (2024); Detroit Lions (2025); Buffalo Bills (2026–present)

Career NFL statistics as of Week 10, 2026
- Passing attempts: 707
- Passing completions: 442
- Completion percentage: 62.5%
- TD–INT: 26–21
- Passing yards: 4,753
- Passer rating: 82.1
- Stats at Pro Football Reference

Kyle James Allen (born March 8, 1996) is an American professional football quarterback for the Buffalo Bills of the National Football League (NFL). He played college football for the Texas A&M Aggies and the Houston Cougars.

Allen signed with the Carolina Panthers as an undrafted free agent in 2018. That same year, he started the final game of the season following injuries to both Cam Newton and Taylor Heinicke, as well as for the majority of the 2019 season after Newton suffered another injury. He was traded to Washington in 2020 and started four games before breaking his ankle and missing the rest of the season. Allen has also played with the Houston Texans, Detroit Lions, and Pittsburgh Steelers.

== Early life ==
Allen attended Desert Mountain High School in Scottsdale, Arizona. He was teammates with Baltimore Ravens tight end Mark Andrews. During his high school career, he passed for over 8,000 yards and had 86 passing touchdowns. Allen was a five-star recruit by Rivals.com and was ranked as the best pro-style quarterback and seventh best player overall in his class. He was highly recruited out of high school, receiving offers from several schools to play college football before committing to Texas A&M in June 2013. Allen played for the West team in the 2014 U.S. Army All-American Bowl, setting an Army Bowl record at the time with 183 passing yards.

== College career ==
=== Texas A&M ===
==== 2014 ====
As a true freshman in 2014, Allen competed with Kenny Hill before the season for the starting quarterback position. Hill would win the job with Allen appearing in games as a backup. After the team lost three straight games in October, the competition was opened again prior to the game against Louisiana-Monroe, and Allen won the starting quarterback position.

On September 14, 2014, he made his first appearance with the Aggies and threw for 122 yards, two touchdowns, and an interception. Allen helped lead the unranked Aggies past the #3 Auburn Tigers with 277 yards and four touchdowns along with one interception in a 41–38 victory, ending Auburn's chances of making the playoffs and putting A&M back in the Top 25.

Allen finished the season with a 3–2 win–loss record, including a Liberty Bowl win. He earned the MVP award for the bowl game. He finished his freshman season with 118 completions off 192 attempts for 1,322 passing yards, 16 touchdowns, and seven interceptions.

==== 2015 ====
Following the transfer of Kenny Hill to Texas Christian University, Allen was positioned to be the starter for the Aggies in 2015. On August 24, 2015, Allen was named the starting quarterback against Arizona State with competition from incoming freshman Kyler Murray.

Texas A&M got off to a 5–0 start, as Allen led the SEC in passing efficiency. Then, against Alabama, he threw three interceptions that were returned for touchdowns in a 41–23 loss. During that game, he had a 50 percent completion rate. He went 12-for-34 passing (35.3 percent passing completion rate) for 88 yards in a 23–3 loss to Ole Miss on October 24. The Friday before the following game, head coach Kevin Sumlin named Murray the starter and Allen started to practice with the third team.

Against Alabama, Allen said that he suffered an AC sprain in his throwing shoulder but told the coaching staff he was well enough to face Ole Miss. Allen would then miss playing in the 35–28 win on October 31 against South Carolina and the Aggies loss to Auburn (26–10). Murray would start in both of those games and a home win over Western Carolina. Allen would return as the starter on Nov 21, a 25–0 win over Vanderbilt. He played his last game with the Aggies on November 28, 2015, completing 15-of-28 passes for 161 yards and a touchdown in a 7–19 loss to LSU. Allen finished his second year with completing 160 of 283 passes for 2,210 yards, 17 touchdowns, and seven interceptions to go along with 65 rushing yards and two touchdowns.

On December 10, 2015, Allen announced he would be transferring from Texas A&M. This decision made Allen unavailable to play in the Aggies' Music City bowl game. He ended his Aggies career completing 278 of 475 passes (58.5%) for 3,532 passing yards, 33 touchdowns, and 14 interceptions in 20 games.

=== Houston ===
Allen announced on January 5, 2016, that he intended to transfer to the University of Houston. Allen began classes at Houston on January 19, but was not eligible to play for the Cougars during the 2016 season due to NCAA transfer guidelines that require transfers to sit out an entire year.

Allen began the 2017 season as the starting quarterback for the Houston Cougars. His first game was a 19–16 victory by the Cougars over the Arizona Wildcats on September 9, 2017. The following week against Rice, Allen set the University of Houston single-game completion percentage record and the FBS single-game completion percentage record (minimum 30 completions), completing 31 of 33 passes (93.94%) and throwing two touchdowns in a 38–3 victory on September 16. He then was benched in favor of Kyle Postma during Houston's third game against Texas Tech after throwing four interceptions in three games. On January 11, 2018, Allen announced his decision to forgo his final year of eligibility and declared for the 2018 NFL draft.

=== Statistics ===
Season	Team	Games			Passing								Rushing			
Season	Team	GP	GS	Record	Cmp	Att	Pct	Yds	Y/A	TD	Int	Rtg	Att	Yds	Avg	TD
2014	Texas A&M	9	5	3–2	118	192	61.5	1,322	6.9	16	7	139.5	29	44	1.5	1
2015	Texas A&M	10	9	6–3	160	283	56.5	2,210	7.8	17	7	137.0	65	102	1.6	2
2016	Houston	0	0	—	(redshirt) Redshirted											
2017	Houston	5	3	2–1	80	105	76.2	751	7.2	4	4	141.2	11	−14	−1.3	0
Career		24	17	11–6	358	580	61.7	4,283	7.4	37	18	138.6	105	132	1.3	3

== Professional career ==
Pre-draft measurables
Height	Weight	Arm length	Hand span	Wingspan	40-yard dash	10-yard split	20-yard split	20-yard shuttle	Vertical jump	Broad jump
6 ft 3 1/4 in (1.91 m)	210 lb (95 kg)	29 5/8 in (0.75 m)	9 3/8 in (0.24 m)	6 ft 1 7/8 in (1.88 m)	4.71 s	1.71 s	2.76 s	4.26 s	28.5 in (0.72 m)	9 ft 5 in (2.87 m)
All values from Pro Day

=== Carolina Panthers ===
==== 2018 season ====
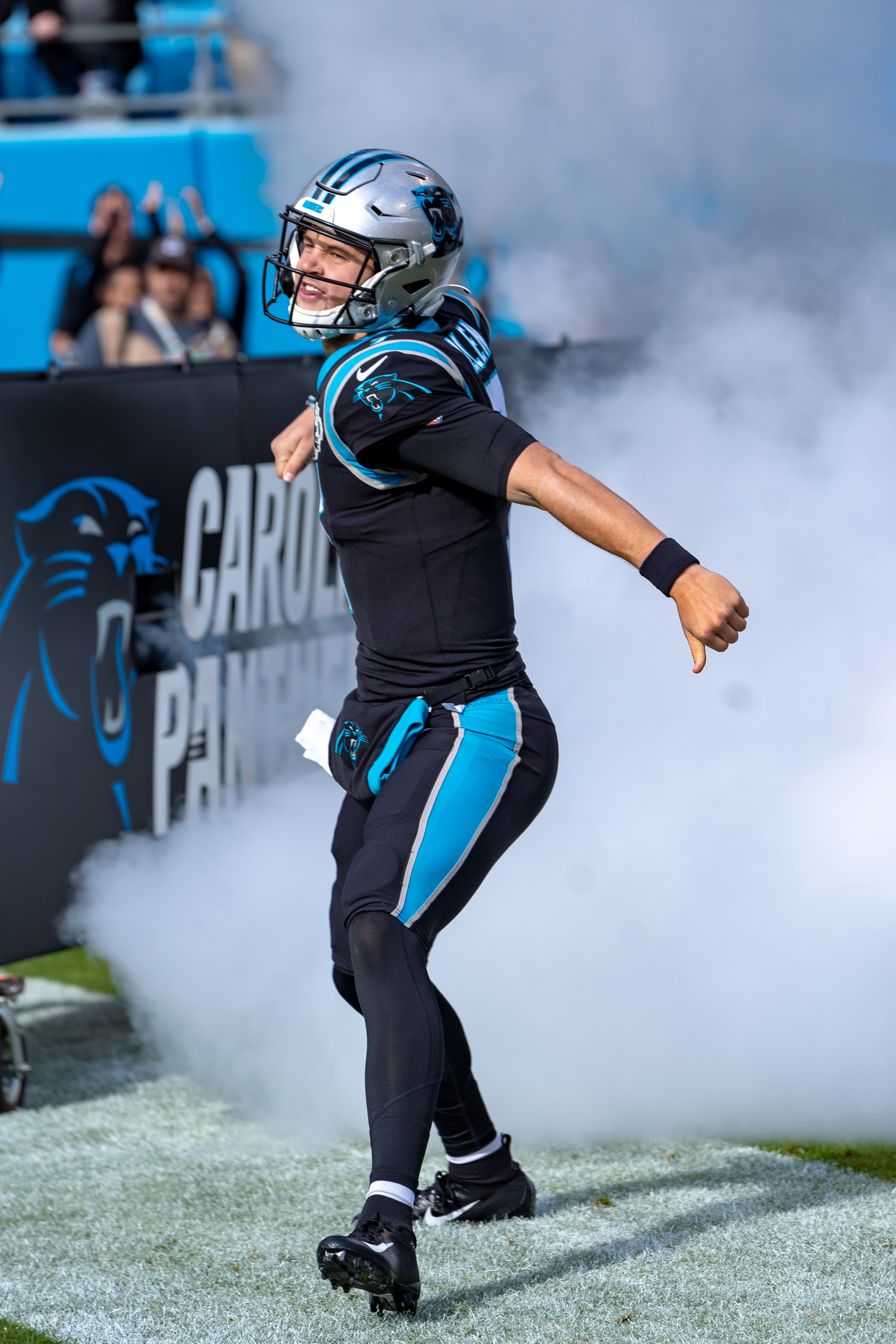
Allen in 2019

On April 28, 2018, Allen signed with the Carolina Panthers as an undrafted free agent. He was waived on September 1 and was signed to the Panthers' practice squad the next day. He was released nine days later. Allen was re-signed to the Panthers practice squad on October 30. On December 20, he was promoted to the active roster to back up Taylor Heinicke after starter Cam Newton was shut down for the season.

On December 23, 2018, he made his NFL debut against the Atlanta Falcons in relief for an injured Heinicke going 4-of-4 with 38 yards in his two drives before Heinicke came back into the game at the two minute warning of the first half. Allen would go on to make his first NFL start in the last game of the season against the New Orleans Saints. He finished the 33–14 road victory going 16-of-27 for 228 passing yards and two touchdowns to go along with a rushing touchdown before suffering a shoulder injury early in the fourth quarter.

==== 2019 season ====
Allen made his first start of the 2019 season in Week 3 against the Arizona Cardinals due to a foot injury to Cam Newton. Allen threw for 261 yards, four touchdowns, and no interceptions as the Panthers won on the road 38–20. In the next game against the Houston Texans, he went 24-of-34 for 232 yards in the 16–10 road victory. Allen helped lead the Panthers to victories over the Jacksonville Jaguars and Tampa Bay Buccaneers over the following two weeks. During the first five games he started, Allen threw nine touchdowns with no interceptions and secured five victories.

During a Week 8 51–13 road loss to the San Francisco 49ers, Allen threw for 158 yards and three interceptions. Three weeks later against the Atlanta Falcons, he finished with 325 passing yards and four interceptions in the 29–3 loss. Allen's performance improved drastically in the following week against the Saints. In the game, he threw for 256 yards and three touchdowns in the 34–31 road loss. During a Week 15 30–24 loss to the Seattle Seahawks, Allen had 277 passing yards, a touchdown, and three interceptions. On December 16, 2019, the Panthers announced that Allen would be benched for rookie quarterback Will Grier in Week 16 against the Indianapolis Colts. In the regular-season finale against the Saints, Allen entered the game during the second quarter after Grier suffered a foot injury. Allen threw for 295 yards and an interception during the 42–10 loss.

Allen finished the 2019 season with 3,322 passing yards, 17 touchdowns, and 16 interceptions to go along with 106 rushing yards and two touchdowns in 13 games and 12 starts.

=== Washington Football Team ===
==== 2020 season ====
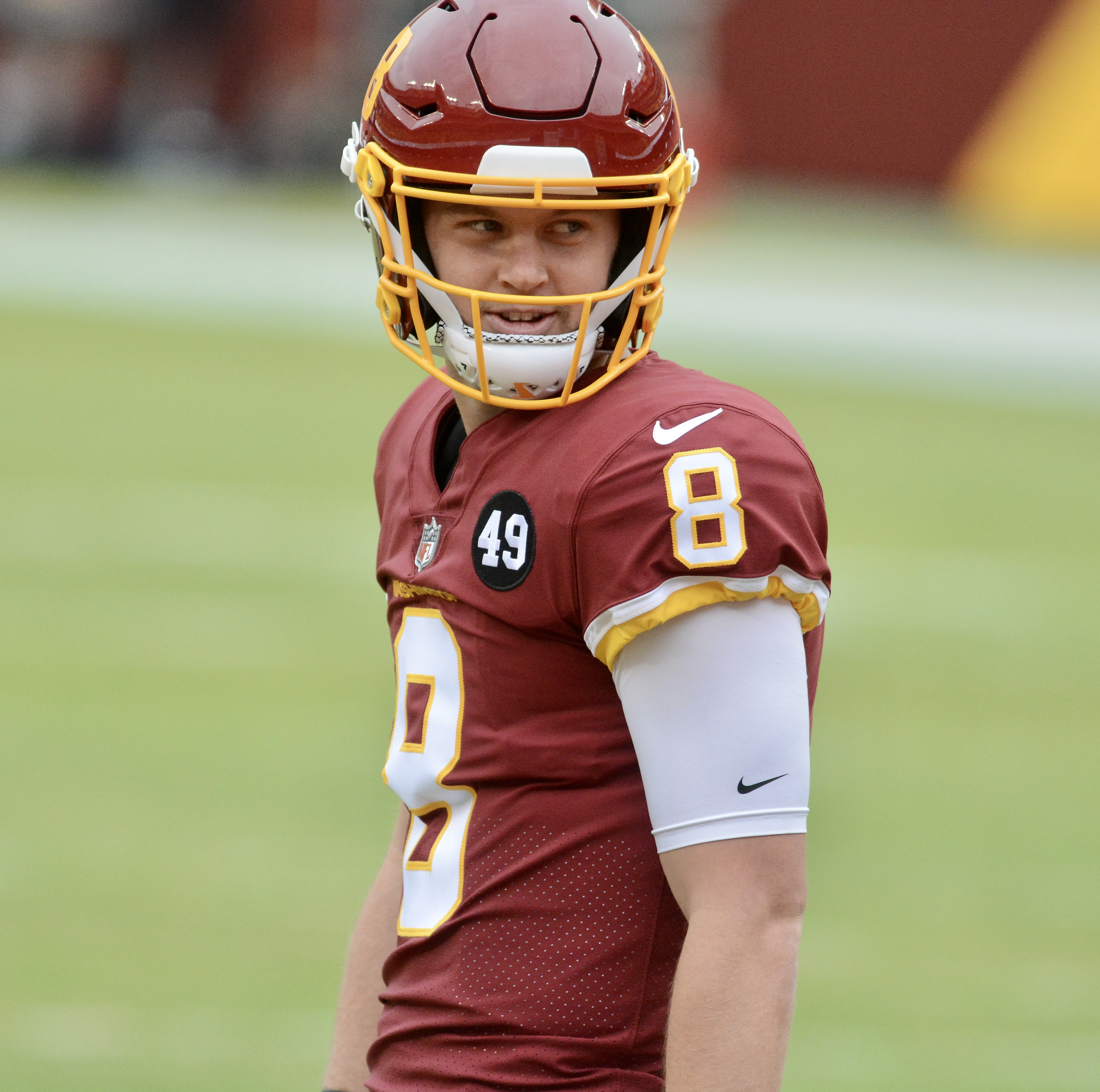
Allen in 2020

On March 24, 2020, Allen was traded to the Washington Football Team for a fifth-round pick in the 2020 NFL draft. The trade reunited him with former Panthers head coach Ron Rivera, who became Washington's new head coach that season.

Allen was named the starter after Dwayne Haskins was benched prior to their Week 5 game against the Los Angeles Rams. Against the Rams, Allen ran for a touchdown before missing the rest of the game after suffering a helmet-to-helmet hit by Jalen Ramsey in the second quarter of the 33–13 loss. Allen returned the following week and started the next few games until suffering a dislocated ankle in a Week 9 23–20 loss to the New York Giants. He was placed on injured reserve shortly afterward.

==== 2021 season ====
Washington placed an exclusive-rights free agent tender on Allen on March 10, 2021, which he signed on March 18. Allen played for the first time in the 2021 season during the Week 14 matchup against the Dallas Cowboys, in relief of Taylor Heinicke who left the game in the fourth quarter due to injury. In the 27–20 loss, Allen had four completions out of nine pass attempts for 52 yards to go along with 11 rushing yards and a lost fumble recovered by Dallas. On December 15, he was placed on the COVID-19 reserve list and placed back on the active roster nine days later.

=== Houston Texans ===
On March 23, 2022, Allen signed a one-year, $2.5 million contract with the Houston Texans.

Following the team's Week 11 23–10 loss to the Commanders, Allen was named the team's starter over Davis Mills. He started the next two games against the Miami Dolphins and Cleveland Browns, respectively, before being benched in favor of Mills; in his two starts, Allen threw two touchdowns to four interceptions and lost a fumble that was returned for a touchdown.

=== Buffalo Bills (first stint) ===
On March 16, 2023, Allen signed a one-year contract with the Buffalo Bills.

=== Pittsburgh Steelers ===
On April 1, 2024, Allen signed a one-year contract with the Pittsburgh Steelers.

During a Week 5 20–17 loss to the Cowboys, Allen relieved starting quarterback Justin Fields for one play when Fields was briefly pulled from the game due to Fields taking a hit to the head during a sack. Allen threw one pass to Pat Freiermuth for 19 yards. Allen spent the season as the team's third-string quarterback behind Fields and Russell Wilson.

=== Detroit Lions ===
On March 13, 2025, Allen signed a one-year, $1.27 million contract with the Detroit Lions. During training camp, he entered into a quarterback competition with Hendon Hooker for the role of backup QB to starter Jared Goff, which he eventually won.

=== Buffalo Bills (second stint) ===
On March 12, 2026, Allen signed a two-year, $4.1 million contract with the Buffalo Bills.

== NFL career statistics ==
Legend
	Led the league
**Bold**	Career high

Year	Team	Games			Passing									Rushing					Sacked		Fumbles	
Year	Team	GP	GS	Record	Cmp	Att	Pct	Yds	Y/A	Lng	TD	Int	Rtg	Att	Yds	Y/A	Lng	TD	Sck	SckY	Fum	Lost
2018	CAR	2	1	**1–0**	20	31	64.5	266	8.6	**53**	2	0	113.1	5	19	3.8	10	1	0	0	0	0
2019	CAR	**13**	**12**	5–7	**303**	**489**	62.0	**3,322**	6.8	52	**17**	**16**	80.0	**32**	**106**	3.3	**17**	**2**	**46**	**397**	**13**	**7**
2020	WAS	4	4	1–3	60	87	69.0	610	7.0	52	4	1	99.3	7	26	3.7	13	1	7	44	1	1
2021	WAS	2	0	—	12	19	63.2	120	6.3	19	1	0	98.6	2	11	**5.5**	11	0	2	5	1	1
2022	HOU	2	2	0–2	46	78	59.0	416	5.3	39	2	4	60.6	6	13	2.2	5	0	5	41	4	1
2023	BUF	7	0	—	0	0	0.0	0	0.0	0	0	0	0.0	13	−13	−1.0	0	0	0	0	0	0
2024	PIT	1	0	—	1	1	**100.0**	19	**19.0**	19	0	0	**118.7**	0	0	0.0	0	0	0	0	0	0
2025	DET	3	0	—	0	2	0.0	0	0.0	0	0	0	39.6	3	–3	–1.0	–1	0	0	0	0	0
2026	BUF	3	0	—	0	0	0.0	0	0.0	0	0	0	0.0	7	–6	–0.9	–1	0	0	0	0	0
Career		37	19	7–12	442	707	62.5	4,753	6.7	53	26	21	82.1	75	153	2.0	17	4	60	487	19	10
