= Cedric Ogbuehi =

American football player (born 1992)

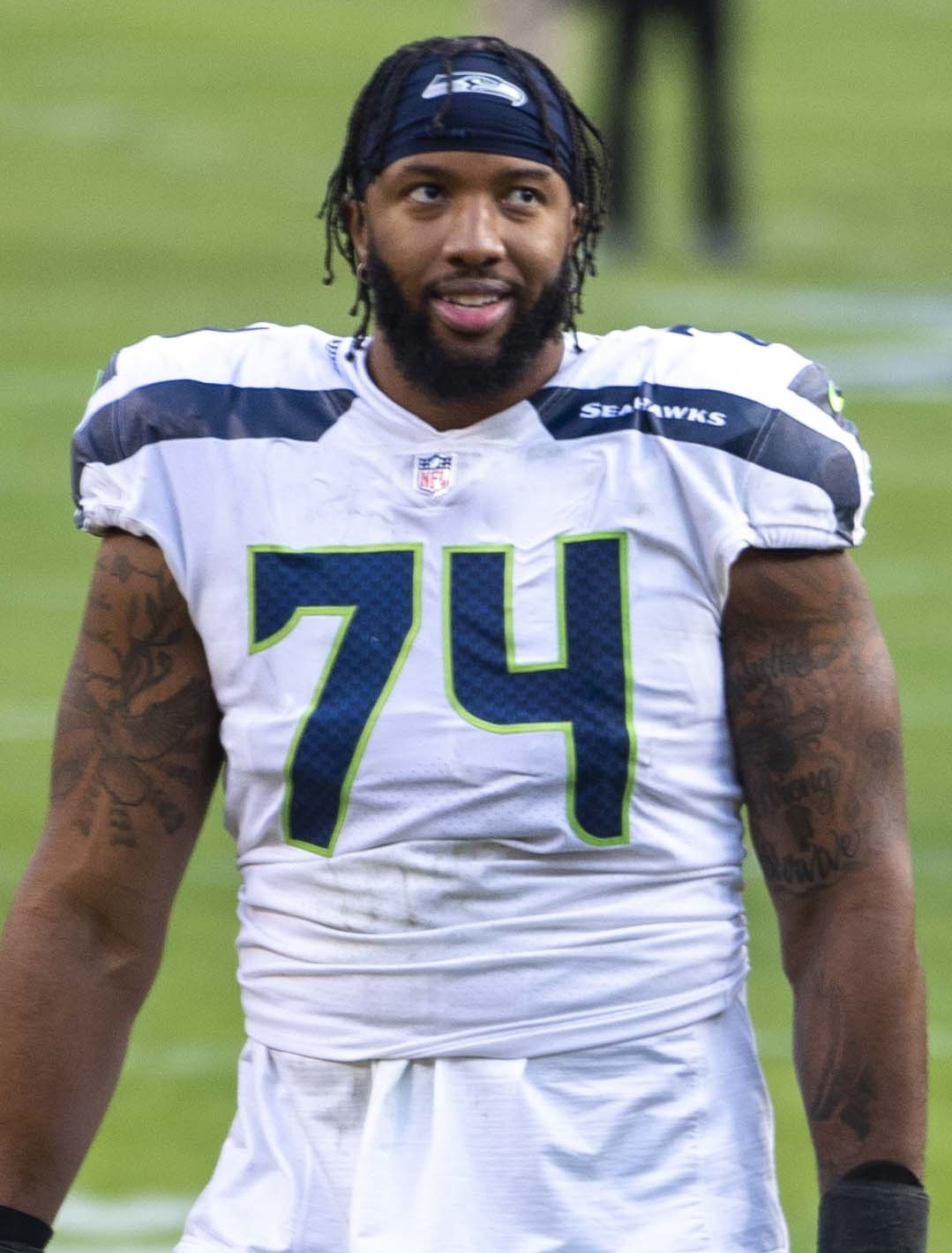
- Ogbuehi with the Seattle Seahawks in 2020

No. 70, 77, 74, 67
- Position: Offensive tackle

Personal information
- Born: April 25, 1992 (age 34); Allen, Texas, U.S.
- Listed height: 6 ft 5 in (1.96 m)
- Listed weight: 310 lb (141 kg)

Career information
- High school: Allen
- College: Texas A&M (2010–2014)
- NFL draft: 2015: 1st round, 21st overall pick

Career history
- Cincinnati Bengals (2015–2018); Jacksonville Jaguars (2019); Seattle Seahawks (2020–2021); Baltimore Ravens (2021); Tennessee Titans (2021)*; Houston Texans (2022)*; New York Jets (2022); Miami Dolphins (2023)*; New York Jets (2023)*
- * Offseason or practice squad member only

Awards and highlights
- First-team All-American (2014); First-team All-SEC (2014)

Career NFL statistics
- Games played: 67
- Games started: 35
- Stats at Pro Football Reference

Cedric Ogbuehi // (born April 25, 1992) is an American former professional football player who was an offensive tackle in the National Football League (NFL). He played college football for the Texas A&M Aggies, and was selected by the Cincinnati Bengals in the first round of the 2015 NFL draft. He played in the NFL for the Bengals, Jacksonville Jaguars, Seattle Seahawks, Baltimore Ravens, and New York Jets.

== Early life ==
Ogbuehi attended Allen High School in Allen, Texas, where he was a two-time all-state selection for the football team. In his junior year, Ogbuehi was the best blocker for an offense that averaged 36.1 points and 225 rushing yards per game, finishing the season 15–1 with a UIL state championship. As a senior, Ogbuehi helped lead the way for an Allen offense that averaged over 466 yards per game, allowing just one sack. He was an Associated Press second-team all-state pick and unanimous first-team all-district honoree. He played in the 2010 U.S. Army All-American Bowl.

Regarded as a four-star recruit by Rivals.com, Ogbuehi was ranked as the No. 13 offensive tackle recruit in his class. He chose Texas A&M over offers from Nebraska, Kansas, Texas Tech, and Oklahoma State.

== College career ==
Ogbuehi was redshirted in 2010. As a freshman in 2011, he started six of 10 games at guard. As a sophomore in 2012, he started all 13 games at guard. As a junior in 2013, he was moved to the offensive tackle position.

As a senior in 2014, he received first-team All-America honors from the Walter Camp Football Foundation.

== Professional career ==
=== Pre-draft ===
As early as May 2014, Ogbuehi was projected as a high first-round selection in the 2015 NFL draft by various mock drafts. After the NFL Combine, most analysts had projected Ogbuehi to be a first or second-round selection. Although he was invited and attended the combine, he was unable to participate in the workouts due to his ACL injury. He was ranked the seventh-best offensive tackle out of the 88 available by NFLDraftScout.com.

Pre-draft measurables
Height	Weight	Arm length	Hand span	Bench press
6 ft 5 1/4 in (1.96 m)	306 lb (139 kg)	35 7/8 in (0.91 m)	10 in (0.25 m)	23 reps
All values from NFL Combine

=== Cincinnati Bengals ===
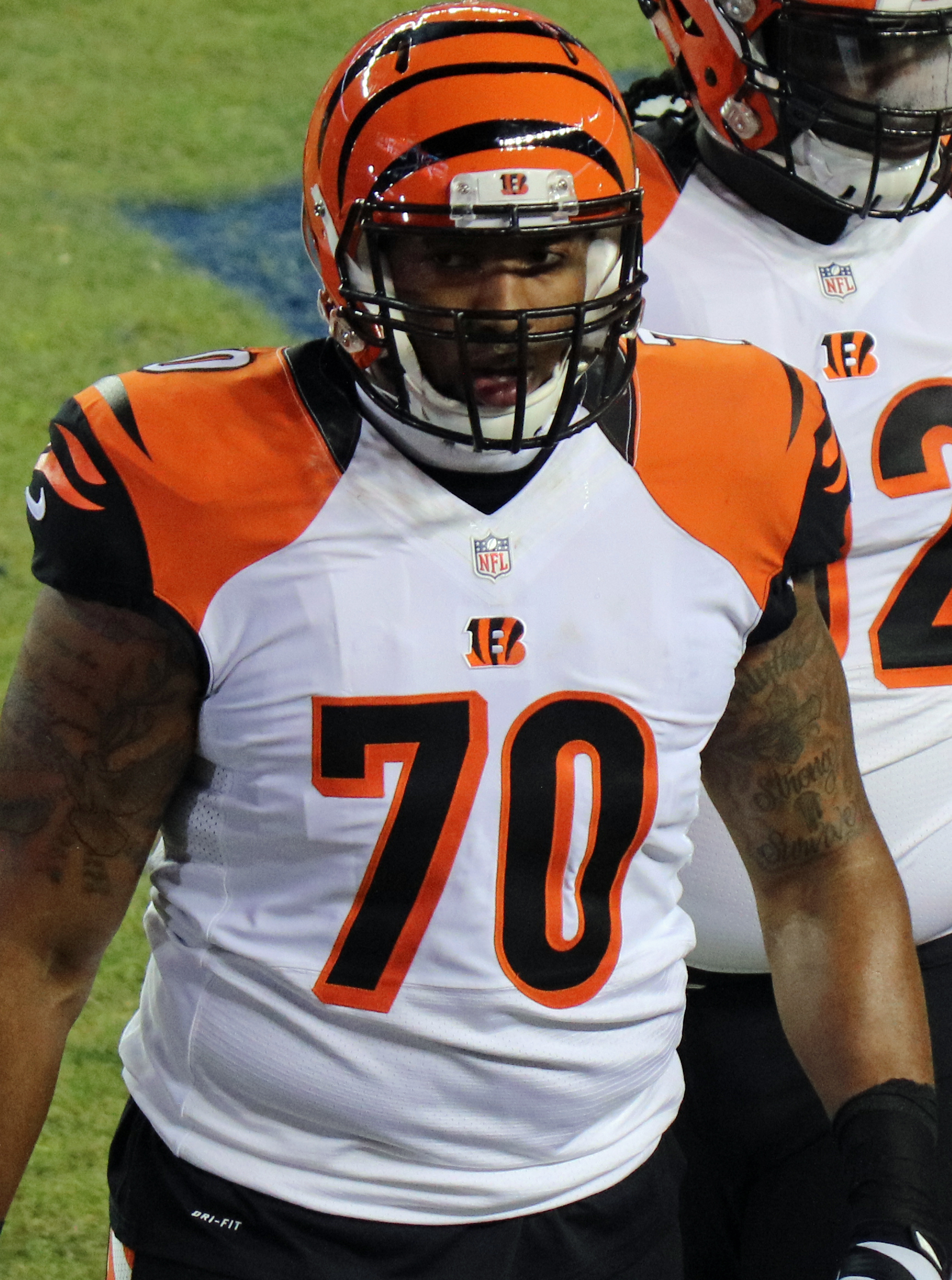
Ogbuehi playing for the Bengals in 2015.

The Cincinnati Bengals selected Ogbuehi in the first round (21st overall) of the 2015 NFL Draft. On June 11, 2015, the Bengals signed him to a four-year, $9.32 million contract with $8.72 million guaranteed and a signing bonus $5.04 million. On September 1, 2015, the Bengals added Ogbuehi to the reserve/non-football injury list. They were taking extra precaution as he recovered from his ACL injury. On December 6, 2015, Ogbuehi made his regular-season debut during the Bengals' 37–3 victory over the Cleveland Browns. He played the last five games of the season and also appeared in the Bengals' 16–18 AFC wildcard round loss to the Pittsburgh Steelers.

In 2016, he started training camp, competing against Jake Fisher and Eric Winston for the vacant right tackle position left by Andre Smith. Ogbuehi ultimately won the job, starting the regular season as the Bengals' right tackle. He earned his first career start in the Bengals' season-opening 22–23 win over the New York Jets. Ogbuehi started the next 11 games at right tackle before being inactive for a Week 13 matchup against the Philadelphia Eagles. He made his first start at left tackle in Week 16 after struggling on the right side, moving long-time starter Andrew Whitworth to left guard for the game. He gave up two sacks that game and suffered a torn rotator cuff, ending his season.

In 2017, after Whitworth departed to the Los Angeles Rams in free agency, Ogbuehi was named the starting left tackle for the Bengals.

On May 2, 2018, the Bengals declined the fifth-year option on Ogbuehi's contract, making him a free agent in 2019. He only played in two games in 2018, and was a healthy scratch for most of the season.

=== Jacksonville Jaguars ===
On March 16, 2019, Ogbuehi signed with the Jacksonville Jaguars on a one-year $895,000 contract.

=== Seattle Seahawks ===
On March 23, 2020, Ogbuehi signed a one-year contract with the Seattle Seahawks. He re-signed with the Seahawks on March 26, 2021. He was placed on injured reserve on September 2, 2021. He was activated on October 2, 2021. On October 25, 2021, the Seahawks released Ogbuehi.

=== Baltimore Ravens ===
On October 27, 2021, Ogbuehi was signed to the practice squad of the Baltimore Ravens. On November 6, 2021, Ogbuehi was promoted to the active roster. On December 3, 2021, the Ravens released Ogbuehi.

=== Tennessee Titans ===
On December 27, 2021, Ogbuehi was signed to the Tennessee Titans practice squad, but was released two days later.

=== Houston Texans ===
On March 18, 2022, Ogbuehi signed with the Houston Texans. He was released on August 30, 2022, and signed to the practice squad the next day.

=== New York Jets (first stint) ===
On September 27, 2022, Ogbuehi was signed by the Jets off the practice squad of the Texans. He started four games at right tackle before being placed on injured reserve on December 3, 2022, with a groin injury. He was activated on December 31.

On April 18, 2023, Ogbuehi re-signed with the Jets. He was released on May 11.

=== Miami Dolphins ===
On May 15, 2023, Ogbuehi was signed by the Miami Dolphins. He was released on August 29, 2023, as a part of the team's final roster cuts.

=== New York Jets (second stint) ===
On September 21, 2023, Ogbuehi was signed to the Jets practice squad. He was released on October 3, 2023.

=== NFL career statistics ===
Year	Team	GP	GS
2015	CIN	5	0
2016	CIN	14	12
2017	CIN	14	13
2018	CIN	2	0
2019	JAX	14	0
2020	SEA	8	4
2021	BAL	2	0
2021	SEA	1	0
2022	NYJ	7	5
Career		67	35
