= 2015 Sugar Bowl =

College Football Playoff Semifinal bowl game

2015 Allstate Sugar Bowl
- College Football Playoff Semifinal; 81st Sugar Bowl
Ohio State Buckeyes	Alabama Crimson Tide
(12–1)	(12–1)
Big Ten	SEC
42	35
Head coach: Urban Meyer	Head coach: Nick Saban
AP / Coaches / CFP; 5 / 4 / 4	AP / Coaches / CFP; 1 / 1 / 1
	1	2	3	4	Total
Ohio State	6	14	14	8	42
Alabama	14	7	7	7	35
- Date: January 1, 2015
- Season: 2014
- Stadium: Mercedes-Benz Superdome
- Location: New Orleans, Louisiana
- MVP: Ezekiel Elliott (RB, Ohio State); Darron Lee (LB, Ohio State)
- Favorite: Alabama by 7.5
- Referee: Land Clark (Pac-12)
- Halftime show: The Ohio State University Marching Band and the University of Alabama Million Dollar Band
- Attendance: 74,682

United States TV coverage
- Network: ESPN
- Announcers: Brad Nessler, Todd Blackledge, and Holly Rowe
- Nielsen ratings: 15.2 (28.3 million viewers)

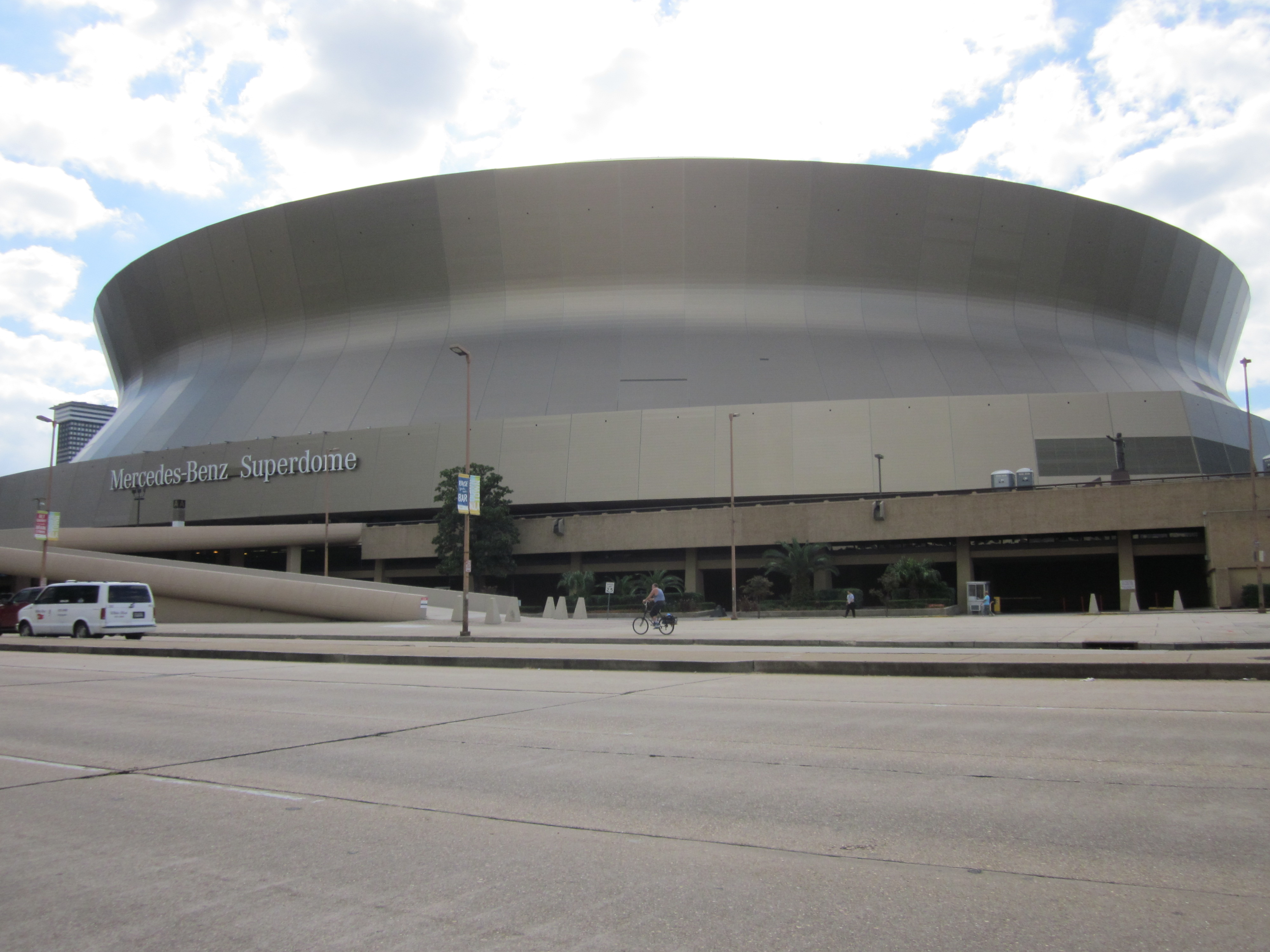
The Mercedes-Benz Superdome in New Orleans, Louisiana, hosted the Sugar Bowl.

The 2015 Sugar Bowl (officially known as the College Football Playoff Semifinal at the 2015 Allstate Sugar Bowl for sponsorship reasons) was a college football bowl game played on January 1, 2015, at Mercedes-Benz Superdome in New Orleans, Louisiana. The game was the 81st playing of the Sugar Bowl and the second semifinal of the inaugural College Football Playoff (CFP), part of the slate of bowl games that concluded the 2014 FBS football season. The game featured two of the four teams chosen by the CFP selection committee: the No. 1 Alabama Crimson Tide from the Southeastern Conference (SEC) and the No. 4 Ohio State Buckeyes from the Big Ten Conference. The winner qualified for the 2015 College Football Playoff National Championship against the winner of the other semifinal, hosted by the Rose Bowl Game.

The contest was televised on ESPN and ESPN Deportes, with a radio broadcast on ESPN Radio and XM Satellite Radio. Kickoff time was set for 8:30 p.m. ET (7:30 p.m. local time).

== Teams ==
The participants were announced on December 7, 2014, based on the final rankings by the College Football Playoff selection committee. The Rose Bowl hosted the other College Football Playoff semifinal game between No. 3 Florida State and No. 2 Oregon. When not hosting the semifinals of the new CFP system (once every three years), the Sugar Bowl typically features the Southeastern Conference (SEC) and Big 12 Conference champions, or the highest ranked remaining team from the respective conferences if one or both champions are selected for the CFP semifinals.

=== Alabama ===
The Alabama Crimson Tide entered the season ranked 2nd in the AP and Coaches polls behind defending National Champions Florida State. Along with Ohio State, the Crimson Tide were considered a preseason favorite for a berth in the inaugural College Football playoff. After losing offensive coordinator Doug Nussmeier to Michigan, the Crimson Tide added former Oakland Raiders, Tennessee, and USC head football coach Lane Kiffin as their offensive coordinator. Among other changes came a change at quarterback with a controversy between Blake Sims and Florida State transfer Jacob Coker. Initially, Coker was considered to be the favorite for the starting job; however, Sims, a more mobile quarterback, was named the starter shortly before the season began. Alabama played its first game of the season in Atlanta in the Chick-fil-A Kickoff Game against the West Virginia Mountaineers, pulling away late to win 33–23. After two easy wins against Florida Atlantic and Southern Miss, Alabama played Florida, a rival from the SEC East Division. Florida took an early 14–7 lead but the Crimson Tide eventually took control behind strong performances by Blake Sims and wide receiver Amari Cooper. In the next game, Alabama played fellow SEC West Division for Ole Miss. In that game, which was played in Oxford, Mississippi, Ole Miss upset the #3 Crimson Tide 23–17 after a shaky performance by Blake Sims. At this point in the season, Alabama's playoff hopes were in doubt as three SEC teams (Mississippi State, Ole Miss, and Auburn) were ranked in the initial College Football Playoff rankings ahead of the #5 Crimson Tide. In their next four games, the Tide handily beat Tennessee and Texas A&M but struggled against last place Arkansas and West Division rivals LSU, winning 14–13 against the Razorbacks and 20–13 in overtime versus the Tigers. Through these games, Sims struggled while Amari Cooper's success propelled the Tide offense to narrow wins. At this point in the season, speculation rose whether Jakob Coker would be moved into the starting role for the struggling Sims.

Alabama entered its annual contest against #1 Mississippi State as the #5 team in the College Football Playoff standings. The Bulldogs were having a season like no other in their history, winning decisively against then-highly ranked Texas A&M and Auburn, respectively. Dak Prescott, the senior quarterback for the Bulldogs, was thriving under Dan Mullen's system and was at the time a top Heisman Trophy candidate. In the game, the Crimson Tide came out strong, building an early 19–0 lead on Mississippi State. The Bulldogs brought the score to 19–13 before Alabama scored one last touchdown to effectively end the game. The final score was 25–20 after a late Mississippi State touchdown. In the game, the Crimson Tide's stifling defense overwhelmed Dak Prescott and forced him into the worst game of his 2014 season. Following the game, the Crimson Tide jumped to #1 in the standings while the Bulldogs dropped to #4. After a routine win against Western Carolina, the Crimson Tide then looked on to the Auburn Tigers. In the previous season, the Tigers won one of the most thrilling games in the history of college football 34–28 in the Iron Bowl with a late field goal return for a touchdown (now dubbed the "Kick Six"). In this edition of the Iron Bowl, Auburn jumped on multiple interceptions by Blake Sims to stay ahead of the Crimson Tide; however, a second half turnaround by Sims saw Alabama win the highest scoring edition of the Iron Bowl, 55–44. The next week, the #1 ranked Crimson Tide routed the SEC East Division champion Missouri Tigers, 42–13, in the SEC Championship, all but securing a #1 seed in the playoff and a Sugar Bowl berth the following morning.

=== Ohio State ===
The Ohio State Buckeyes entered the 2014 season ranked #5 in both the AP and Coaches polls. They were an early favorite, along with Alabama, to make it to inaugural College Football Playoff. Two weeks before the season started, two-time Big Ten Offensive player of the year and Heisman Trophy candidate Braxton Miller was injured in practice. It was determined that Miller had a torn labrum which required surgery, and the Buckeyes looked to J. T. Barrett, an unproven redshirt freshman. The Buckeyes were underwhelming in their opener against Navy, winning 34–17 after trailing for a majority of the game. The next week, the Buckeyes played Virginia Tech at home and, surprisingly, lost the decision 35–21. Barrett's inexperience along with the inexperience of the offensive line proved costly in the Buckeyes' defeat to the Hokies. After the loss, the Buckeyes coasted through their next four games, scoring over 50 points in each matchup versus Kent State, Cincinnati, Maryland, and Rutgers, respectively. Following a 31–24 overtime victory against Penn State in Happy Valley, the Buckeyes were ranked No. 16 in the initial College Football Playoff rankings. The Buckeyes jumped to 14th in the CFP rankings following a 55–14 dismantling of rival Illinois and were ready for a primetime matchup against the #8 Michigan State Spartans.

Ever since the Spartans defeated the Buckeyes by a score of 34–24 in the 2013 Big Ten Football Championship Game, the 2014 edition was highly anticipated. Due to Ohio State's loss to Virginia Tech and Braxton Miller's injury, the game lost a bit of its luster. Regardless, College Gameday made the trip to East Lansing as the Spartans were two-point favorites over the Buckeyes. In a show of their offensive strength, J. T. Barrett and the Buckeyes handily defeated the Spartans 49–37. Following the win, Ohio State was back in the Playoff hunt and Barrett was an established Heisman Trophy candidate. Following close wins against the Minnesota Golden Gophers and the Indiana Hoosiers, the Buckeyes entered their rivalry game against Michigan ranked #6 and just outside a playoff spot. In the game, Ohio State struggled early before pulling away to a 42–28 victory against their rivals. The win came at a cost, however, as J. T. Barrett was injured in the fourth quarter with a broken ankle.

Following Barrett's injury during the Michigan Game, Ohio State turned to their third-string quarterback, Cardale Jones, for the Big Ten Championship game against Wisconsin. Because #4 Mississippi State lost in the Egg Bowl, Ohio State moved from #6 to #5 despite the loss of Barrett. Due to the game being Jones' first collegiate start, the Buckeyes entered as a 4.5 point underdog to the West Division champion Badgers. Ohio State, however, proved the oddsmakers wrong as Jones shined in a 59–0 rout of Wisconsin to capture the program's 35th Big Ten Championship and a potential College Football Playoff berth. The next morning, it was announced that Ohio State's win had propelled them to #4 in the final College Football Playoff rankings, securing their spot in the Sugar Bowl against #1 Alabama. This move proved to be controversial, as TCU had been ranked #3 but fell to #6 in favor of Ohio State despite the Horned Frogs also winning their last game.

== Game summary ==
=== First half ===
The game began with Ohio State winning the coin flip and deferring to the second half, so Alabama got the ball to begin the game. The opening kickoff resulted in a touchback that came out to the 20. Alabama was forced to punt on their first drive, going 3 and out. The Buckeyes began their first drive of the night from their own 15 yard line. The Buckeyes drove down the field into the redzone, but failed to get a touchdown, and were forced to kick a field goal, giving them a 3–0 lead. The drive involved a 54-yard run by Ezekiel Elliott in which it saw him break tackles and hurdle another tackler. Alabama was forced to punt on their next drive. However, on the first play of Ohio State's next drive, Elliott lost the first fumble of his career, which was recovered by Landon Collins at the Ohio State 32 yard line. Two plays into Alabama's next drive, Derrick Henry ran 25 yards untouched into the endzone for a touchdown, giving the Crimson Tide their first lead of the game, 7–3. Ohio State drove into the Alabama redzone, but once again had to settle for a field goal, cutting the Alabama lead to 7–6. However, the Crimson Tide responded with a 15-yard touchdown pass from Blake Sims to Amari Cooper, increasing the Tide's lead to 14–6. After back-to-back punts by each team, Cardale Jones threw an interception to Cyrus Jones that was returned to the Ohio State 15 yard line. From there, Alabama cashed in with a 2-yard touchdown run by T.J. Yeldon to make the score 21-6 Crimson Tide. The next drive for the Buckeyes started with an unsportsmanlike conduct penalty by Alabama on the succeeding kickoff, giving them the ball at their own 29 yard line. With several big plays during the drive, Ohio State scored a touchdown with Elliott taking it in from 3 yards out to cut the Tide lead to 21–13. After Alabama punted on their next possession, Ohio State took over with 1:32 remaining in the half. With several big plays, including a big run by Jones which set up the Buckeyes in the redzone, Ohio State scored right before the half on an end around touchdown completed with Wide receiver Evan Spencer throwing to wide receiver Michael Thomas in the endzone. Replays showed Thomas making an unbelievable catch along the sidelines by keeping his foot in bounds while maintaining possession of the ball. The touchdown was reviewed and upheld on replay, and Alabama's lead was cut to 21–20 at halftime. Despite trailing by 1 at the half, Ohio State dominated the statsheet, outgaining Alabama 348-139 and being 7/10 on 3rd downs and Alabama being only 1/7. Out of Ohio State's 7 3rd down conversions in the first half, 6 of them were conversions of 8+ yards, the most allowed by Alabama in a decade.

=== Second half ===
In the second half, Ohio State got the ball first to begin quarter 3. The drive was completed with Cardale Jones throwing a 47-yard touchdown pass to Devin Smith to give Ohio State a 27–21 lead. After back-to-back punts by each team, Blake Sims threw an interception that was returned by Steve Miller 36 yards for a touchdown, increasing the Buckeyes lead to 34–21. Sims' pick 6 was the first pick 6 thrown by an Alabama quarterback since 2007. The Crimson Tide, however, were able to go down the field and score a touchdown of their own, cutting the lead to 34–28, which was the score heading into the final quarter. After a long scoring hiatus that saw the 2 teams punt back and forth to each other, Ohio State managed to increase its lead with an 85-yard touchdown run by Ezekiel Elliott, the longest play from scrimmage Alabama had allowed all season. This play earned the game the nickname “85 Yards Through the Heart of the South.” and the “Zeke Streak”. The 2 point conversion was successful, giving the Buckeyes a 42–28 lead. However, the Crimson Tide did not go quietly, scoring quickly to cut the lead to 42–35. After Ohio State was forced to punt on their next drive, the Tide got the ball back with no timeouts, needing to score a touchdown to either force overtime or potentially win with a 2 point conversion of their own. However, it was not to be, as Blake Sims last second hail mary pass was intercepted in the endzone by Tyvis Powell, ending the game and sending Ohio State to the national championship game for the first time since 2008. Sims finished with a career high 3 interceptions.

=== Scoring summary ===
College Football Playoff Semifinal at the 2015 Allstate Sugar Bowl

Quarter	1	2	3	4	Total
No. 4 Ohio State	6	14	14	8	42
No. 1 Alabama	14	7	7	7	35

at Mercedes-Benz Superdome • New Orleans, Louisiana

- Date: Thursday, January 1, 2015
- Game time: 9:00 p.m. EST (8:00 p.m. CST)
- Game weather: n/a (game played indoors)
- Game attendance: 74,682
- Referee: Land Clark (Pac-12)
- TV announcers (ESPN): Brad Nessler (play-by-play), Todd Blackledge (analyst) and Holly Rowe (sideline)
- ESPN game summary

Scoring summary

Quarter	Time	Drive			Team	Scoring information	Score	
Quarter	Time	Plays	Yards	TOP	Team	Scoring information	Ohio State	Alabama
1	11:32	10	80	2:26	Ohio State	22-yard field goal by Sean Nuernberger	3	0
1	9:25	2	33	0:28	Alabama	Derrick Henry 25-yard touchdown run, Adam Griffith kick good	3	7
1	5:17	11	71	4:08	Ohio State	21-yard field goal by Sean Nuernberger	6	7
1	2:06	8	79	3:11	Alabama	Amari Cooper 15-yard touchdown reception from Blake Sims, Adam Griffith kick good	6	14
2	8:07	5	15	2:02	Alabama	T. J. Yeldon 2-yard touchdown run, Adam Griffith kick good	6	21
2	2:55	12	71	5:12	Ohio State	Ezekiel Elliott 3-yard touchdown run, Sean Nuernberger kick good	13	21
2	0:12	6	77	1:20	Ohio State	Michael Thomas 13-yard touchdown reception from Evan Spencer, Sean Nuernberger kick good	20	21
3	12:44	6	75	2:16	Ohio State	Devin Smith 47-yard touchdown reception from Cardale Jones, Sean Nuernberger kick good	27	21
3	3:21				Ohio State	Interception returned 41 yards for touchdown by Steve Miller, Sean Nuernberger kick good	34	21
3	1:01	7	84	2:20	Alabama	Blake Sims 5-yard touchdown run, Adam Griffith kick good	34	28
4	3:24	4	95	2:00	Ohio State	Ezekiel Elliott 85-yard touchdown run, 2-point pass good	42	28
4	1:59	6	65	1:25	Alabama	Amari Cooper 6-yard touchdown reception from Blake Sims, Adam Griffith kick good	42	35
"TOP" = time of possession. For other American football terms, see Glossary of American football.							42	35

== Statistics ==
Team statistical comparison
Statistic	Ohio State	Alabama
First downs	23	21
First downs rushing	12	12
First downs passing	10	8
First downs penalty	1	1
Third down efficiency	10–18	2–13
Fourth down efficiency	0–0	2–2
Total plays–net yards	78–537	70–407
Rushing attempts–net yards	42–281	34–170
Yards per rush	6.7	5.0
Yards passing	256	237
Pass completions–attempts	19–36	22–36
Interceptions thrown	1	3
Punt returns–total yards	2–10	2–10
Kickoff returns–total yards	2–23	7–102
Punts–average yardage	6–46.5	7–55.0
Fumbles–lost	2–1	0–0
Penalties–yards	4–24	4–36
Time of possession	31:19	28:41

Ohio State statistics
Buckeyes passing
	C–A	Yds	TD–INT
Cardale Jones	18–35	243	1–1
Evan Spencer	1–1	13	1–0
Buckeyes rushing
	Car	Yds	TD
Ezekiel Elliott	20	230	2
Cardale Jones	17	43	0
Jalin Marshall	3	11	0
Curtis Samuel	1	1	0
Noah Brown	1	−4	0
Buckeyes receiving
	Rec	Yds	TD
Devin Smith	2	87	1
Michael Thomas	7	66	1
Jalin Marshall	5	55	0
Nick Vannett	2	23	0
Ezekiel Elliott	1	13	0
Evan Spencer	1	7	0
Corey Smith	1	5	0

Alabama statistics
Crimson Tide passing
	C–A	Yds	TD–INT
Blake Sims	22–36	237	2–3
Crimson Tide rushing
	Car	Yds	TD
Derrick Henry	13	95	1
T. J. Yeldon	10	47	1
Blake Sims	10	29	1
TEAM	1	−1	0
Crimson Tide receiving
	Rec	Yds	TD
Amari Cooper	9	71	2
DeAndrew White	3	65	0
Derrick Henry	2	54	0
O. J. Howard	2	14	0
Jalston Fowler	2	14	0
Chris Black	2	10	0
Brian Vogler	2	9	0

== Aftermath ==
With the win, the Buckeyes advanced to their first national championship game since 2007, and played the Rose Bowl champion Oregon Ducks, whom they defeated 42-20 for their eighth national championship and becoming the first champions of the CFP era. This was Ohio State's first win over Alabama in four previous meetings. The loss by Alabama was the Southeastern Conference's second straight loss in a major bowl game to the Buckeyes, along with Arkansas's loss in the 2011 Sugar Bowl. Alabama's loss meant that 2015 was the first national championship to not feature an SEC team since 2005, when USC and Texas played in that season's Rose Bowl. The loss also assured the Crimson Tide a second straight season without appearing in the national championship, the first time that Alabama has missed the national championship in back to back seasons since 2007 and 2008. Ohio State's 15-point comeback over the Tide was the largest ever comeback against a Nick Saban-led team in a bowl game. The loss by Alabama also dropped them to 0-3 under Saban in Sugar Bowls at the time. However, they would eventually win a Sugar Bowl in 2018, beating Clemson 24–6. This was the third time in the Saban era that Alabama had blown a lead of 14 or more points, with each of the other losses to Auburn in 2010 and 2013. The 15-point blown lead was the second largest blown by the Tide during the Saban era. Alabama would return to the playoffs the next year, and would win the Cotton Bowl over another Big 10 team, Michigan State, 38–0, and championship over Clemson, 45–40. As of 2020, Alabama appeared in the playoffs in each season from 2014 to 2018, until missing it in the 2019 season after losing to LSU and Auburn, and has been to five national championships, winning three and losing two, with their latest championship coming over Ohio State in a rematch in the 2021 College Football Playoff National Championship. Ohio State would return to the playoffs again in 2016, 2019, losing to Clemson 0-31 and 23-29, with both meetings occurring in the Fiesta Bowl, and again in 2020, beating Clemson 49-28 in the Sugar Bowl. To conclude the 2020 season, Ohio State would fall to Alabama in the 2021 College Football Playoff National Championship. However, Ohio State eventually won another championship 10 years later, this time becoming the first team to win the CFP with a 12-team field. These teams next scheduled meeting is a home and home series scheduled for 2027 and 2028, with the 2027 game being in Columbus and the 2028 one in Tuscaloosa.
