= 2014 All-SEC football team =

American college football all-star team

The 2014 All-SEC football team consists of American football players selected to the All-Southeastern Conference (SEC) chosen by the Associated Press (AP) and the conference coaches for the 2014 Southeastern Conference football season.

The Alabama Crimson Tide won the conference, beating the Missouri Tigers 42 to 13 in the SEC Championship. The Crimson Tide then lost in the College Football Playoff Semifinal to the eventual national champion, the Ohio State Buckeyes 42 to 35.

Alabama wide receiver Amari Cooper, a unanimous AP selection, was voted the AP SEC Offensive Player of the Year. Missouri defensive end Shane Ray was voted the AP SEC Defensive Player of the Year.

== Offensive selections ==
=== Quarterbacks ===
- Dak Prescott, Miss. St. (AP-1, Coaches-1)
- Blake Sims, Alabama (AP-2, Coaches-2)

=== Running backs ===
- Cameron Artis-Payne, Auburn (AP-1, Coaches-1)
- Nick Chubb, Georgia (AP-1, Coaches-1)
- Josh Robinson, Miss. St. (AP-2, Coaches-2)
- Jonathan Williams, Arkansas (AP-2)
- T. J. Yeldon, Alabama (Coaches-2)

=== Wide receivers ===
- Amari Cooper*, Alabama (AP-1, Coaches-1)
- Pharoh Cooper, South Carolina (AP-1, Coaches-1)
- Bud Sasser, Missouri (AP-1, Coaches-2)
- Josh Reynolds, Texas A&M (AP-2)
- Sammie Coates, Auburn (AP-2, Coaches-2)

=== Centers ===
- Reese Dismukes, Auburn (AP-1, Coaches-1)
- David Andrews, Georgia (AP-2)
- Max Garcia, Florida (Coaches-2)

=== Guards ===
- Arie Kouandjio, Alabama (AP-1, Coaches-1)
- Ben Beckwith, Miss. St. (AP-1, Coaches-2)
- A. J. Cann, South Carolina (AP-2, Coaches-1)
- Greg Pyke, Georgia (AP-2)
- Vadal Alexander, LSU (Coaches-2)

=== Tackles ===
- Lael Collins, LSU (AP-1, Coaches-1)
- Laremy Tunsil, Ole Miss (AP-1, Coaches-2)
- Cedric Ogbuehi, Texas A&M (AP-2, Coaches-1)
- Austin Shepherd, Alabama (AP-2)
- Mitch Morse, Missouri (Coaches-2)

=== Tight ends ===
- Evan Engram, Ole Miss (AP-1, Coaches-1)
- Steven Scheu, Vanderbilt (AP-2)
- Hunter Henry, Arkansas (Coaches-2)

== Defensive selections ==
=== Defensive ends ===
- Shane Ray, Missouri (AP-1, Coaches-1)
- Bud Dupree, Kentucky (AP-1, Coaches-1)
- Preston Smith, Miss. St. (AP-2, Coaches-1)
- Dante Fowler, Florida (Coaches-1)
- Derek Barnett, Tennessee (AP-2, Coaches-2)
- Myles Garrett, Texas A&M (AP-2, Coaches-2)
- Trey Flowers, Arkansas (Coaches-2)
- Markus Golden, Missouri (Coaches-2)
- Jonathan Allen, Alabama (AP-1)

=== Defensive tackles ===
- Robert Nkemdiche, Ole Miss (AP-1)
- Darius Philon, Arkansas (AP-2)

=== Linebackers ===
- Martrell Spaight, Arkansas (AP-1, Coaches-1)
- Amarlo Herrera, Georgia (AP-1, Coaches-2)
- Benardrick McKinney, Miss. St. (AP-2, Coaches-1)
- Reggie Ragland, Alabama (AP-1)
- Trey DePriest, Alabama (Coaches-1)
- Antonio Morrison, Florida (AP-2, Coaches-2)
- Ramik Wilson, Georgia (AP-2, Coaches-2)
- Kwon Alexander, LSU (AP-2)
- Kentrell Brothers, Missouri (AP-2)
- Curt Maggitt, Tennessee (AP-2)

=== Cornerbacks ===
- Senquez Golson*, Ole Miss (AP-1, Coaches-1)
- Vernon Hargreaves III, Florida (AP-1, Coaches-1)
- Damian Swann, Georgia (AP-2, Coaches-2)
- Jonathan Jones, Auburn (AP-2, Coaches-2)
- Cyrus Jones, Alabama (AP-2)

=== Safeties ===
- Landon Collins*, Alabama (AP-1, Coaches-1)
- Cody Prewitt, Ole Miss (AP-1, Coaches-1)
- Braylon Webb, Missouri (AP-2, Coaches-2)
- Ronald Martin, LSU (AP-2)
- Tony Conner, Ole Miss (AP-2)
- Jonathon Mincy, Auburn (Coaches-2)

== Special teams ==
=== Kickers ===
- Austin MacGinnis, Kentucky (AP-1, Coaches-1)
- Josh Lambo, Texas A&M (AP-2)
- Elliott Fry, South Carolina (Coaches-2)

=== Punters ===
- J. K. Scott, Alabama (AP-1, Coaches-1)
- Kyle Christy, Florida (AP-2)
- Jamie Keehn, LSU (Coaches-2)

=== All purpose/return specialist ===
- Marcus Murphy, Missouri (AP-1, Coaches-1)
- Pharoh Cooper, South Carolina (AP-2)
- Quan Bray, Auburn (Coaches-2)

== Key ==
Bold = Consensus first-team selection by both the coaches and AP

AP = Associated Press

Coaches = Selected by the SEC coaches

* = Unanimous selection of AP

== See also ==
- 2014 Southeastern Conference football season
- 2014 College Football All-America Team
