= 2014 Alabama Crimson Tide football team =

American college football season

2014 Alabama Crimson Tide football

SEC champion SEC Western Division champion

SEC Championship Game, W 42–13 vs. Missouri

Sugar Bowl (CFP Semifinal), L 35–42 vs. Ohio State
- Conference: Southeastern Conference
- Western Division

Ranking
- Coaches: No. 4
- AP: No. 4
- CFP: No. 1
- Record: 12–2 (7–1 SEC)
- Head coach: Nick Saban (8th season)
- Offensive coordinator: Lane Kiffin (1st season)
- Offensive scheme: West Coast
- Defensive coordinator: Kirby Smart (7th season)
- Base defense: 3–4
- MVP: Amari Cooper
- Captains: Landon Collins; Amari Cooper; Jalston Fowler; Blake Sims
- Home stadium: Bryant–Denny Stadium

2014 Southeastern Conference football standings
	Conf.			Overall
Team	W		L	W		L
Eastern Division
No. 14 Missouri x	7	–	1	11	–	3
No. 9 Georgia	6	–	2	10	–	3
Florida	4	–	4	7	–	5
Tennessee	3	–	5	7	–	6
South Carolina	3	–	5	7	–	6
Kentucky	2	–	6	5	–	7
Vanderbilt	0	–	8	3	–	9
Western Division
No. 4 Alabama x$^	7	–	1	12	–	2
No. 11 Mississippi State	6	–	2	10	–	3
No. 17 Ole Miss *	5	–	3	9	–	4
No. 22 Auburn	4	–	4	8	–	5
LSU *	4	–	4	8	–	5
Texas A&M	3	–	5	8	–	5
Arkansas	2	–	6	7	–	6
Championship: Alabama 42, Missouri 13
^ – College Football Playoff participant; $ – Conference champion; x – Division champion/co-champions; * LSU and Ole Miss vacated all wins (except for Ole Miss' win over Presbyterian) due to NCAA violations.; Rankings from AP Poll

The 2014 Alabama Crimson Tide football team represented the University of Alabama in the 2014 NCAA Division I FBS football season. It marked the Crimson Tide's 120th overall season, 81st as a member of the Southeastern Conference (SEC) and its 23rd within the SEC Western Division. The team was led by head coach Nick Saban, in his eighth year, and played its home games at Bryant–Denny Stadium in Tuscaloosa, Alabama.

The Alabama Crimson Tide were 12–2 overall and 7–1 in SEC regular season. The Crimson Tide won the SEC Western Division title for the tenth time, advancing to their ninth SEC Championship Game, where they defeated Missouri 42–13. The Crimson Tide played in the inaugural College Football Playoff as the #1 seed, netting a berth in the CFP semifinal 2015 Sugar Bowl, where they were defeated by the #4 seed Ohio State Buckeyes 42–35.

== Before the season ==
=== Fall camp ===
At the start of fall camp on August 1, coach Saban announced Jarran Reed, Brandon Ivory and Tim Williams were suspended indefinitely for violations of team rules. Reed and Ivory returned from suspension on August 4 and Williams returned on August 20. The camp featured several positional battles with incoming freshmen competing for starting spots. Of note were true freshmen Cameron Robinson who landed the starting spot at left tackle over Dominick Jackson and both Tony Brown and Marlon Humphrey who secured back-up roles at defensive back. The most anticipated positional battle of camp was for quarterback. Both Blake Sims and Jacob Coker played themselves into position to be named starter through the end of camp when Sims was selected as the starter for the opening game against West Virginia.

By mid-August, Alabama had a combined 26 players on 12 different preseason award watch lists. Landon Collins, Trey DePriest and A'Shawn Robinson for the Chuck Bednarik Award; Amari Cooper for the Fred Biletnikoff Award; Collins, DePriest and Robinson for the Bronko Nagurski Trophy; DePriest and Reggie Ragland for the Butkus Award; Collins, Cooper and T. J. Yeldon for the Walter Camp Award; Arie Kouandjio and Robinson for the Lombardi Award; O. J. Howard for the John Mackey Award; Jacob Coker, Cooper, Derrick Henry and Yeldon for the Maxwell Award; Ryan Kelly, Kouandjio and Robinson for the Outland Trophy; Kelly for the Rimington Trophy; Collins for the Jim Thorpe Award; and Henry and Yeldon for the Doak Walker Award.

== Coaching staff ==
Alabama head coach Nick Saban entered his eighth year as the Crimson Tide's head coach for the 2014 season. During his previous seven years with Alabama, he led the Crimson Tide to an overall record of 74 wins and 15 losses (74–15) and the 2009, 2011 and 2012 national championships. On January 10, 2014, former Oakland Raiders, Tennessee and USC head coach Lane Kiffin was hired as the replacement for Doug Nussmeier as offensive coordinator. Nussmeier resigned from Alabama on January 9 to become offensive coordinator at Michigan. Kiffin was working with Alabama in some capacity before the team's 2014 Sugar Bowl game and before taking the offensive coordinator position.

On January 11, defensive line coach Chris Rumph resigned and took a position on the Texas staff under new head coach Charlie Strong to replace former defensive line coach Bo Davis. At that time, Davis had accepted a job at USC. After Rumph left Alabama, Davis resigned as defensive line coach at USC after one week on the job to take Rumph's job at Alabama. Davis previously coached defensive line at Alabama from 2007 to 2010.

On February 12, Greg Brown resigned after only one season at Alabama to become the safeties coach at Louisville. Two days later, Kevin Steele was promoted from Alabama's director of player personnel to inside linebackers coach. Steele previously served as a defensive assistant for Saban at Alabama in 2007 and 2008.

Name	Position	Consecutive season at Alabama in current position
Nick Saban	Head coach	8th
Burton Burns	Associate head coach, running backs coach	8th
Lane Kiffin	Offensive coordinator, quarterbacks coach	1st
Kevin Steele	Linebackers	1st
Bo Davis	Defensive line coach	1st
Kirby Smart	Defensive coordinator, Defensive backs	8th
Mario Cristobal	Offensive line coach	2nd
Billy Napier	Wide receivers	2nd
Lance Thompson	Outside linebackers	5th
Bobby Williams	Tight ends coach, special teams	7th
Scott Cochran	Strength and conditioning	8th

== Players ==
=== 2014 recruiting class ===
Prior to National Signing Day on February 5, 2014, eight players enrolled for the spring semester in order to participate in spring practice and included six former high school seniors and two junior college transfers. The early enrollments from high school included top-ranked offensive tackle Cameron Robinson, wide receiver Cameron Sims, safety Laurence "Hootie" Jones, cornerback Tony Brown, quarterback David Cornwell and linebacker Shaun Dion Hamilton. The junior college transfers enrolled early included defensive end D. J. Pettway and defensive tackle Jarran Reed. All of the players will take part in Alabama's "fourth-quarter" strength and conditioning program in February before spring practice starts in March.

On National Signing Day, Alabama signed 18 additional players out of high school that completed the 2014 recruiting class. The class was highlighted by 19 players from the "ESPN 300": No. 3 Cameron Robinson; No. 6 Da'Shawn Hand; No. 8 Tony Brown; No. 12 Bo Scarbrough; No. 15 Marlon Humphrey; No. 27 Laurence Jones; No. 48 Christian Miller; No. 49 Cameron Sims; No. 52 Rashaan Evans; No. 57 David Cornwell; No. 64 Ross Pierschbacher; No. 71 Ronnie Clark; No. 102 Shaun Dion Hamilton; No. 160 Joshua Frazier; No. 168 Josh Casher; No. 190 J. C. Hassenauer; No. 199 Derek Kief; No. 215 O. J. Smith; and No. 281 Keith Holcombe. Alabama signed the No. 1 recruiting class according to Rivals.com, Scout.com and 247Sports.com. Of the 26 players signed only two failed to qualify to compete in 2014: Montel McBride and Bo Scarbrough. McBride played for Iowa Western Community College in 2014 and Scarbrough is expected to enroll at Alabama in January 2015.

In addition to those signed as part of the 2014 class, on January 26 Florida State quarterback Jacob Coker announced his intention to transfer to Alabama. After he graduated in May 2014, Coker officially enrolled at Alabama on May 5. Based on NCAA transfer rules for student athletes who graduate, Coker had two years of eligibility remaining to compete with the Crimson Tide.

College recruiting (2014)
Name	Hometown	School	Height	Weight	40^{‡}	Commit date
Tony Brown; DB	Beaumont, Texas	Ozen High School	6 ft 0 in (1.83 m)	182 lb (83 kg)	4.40	Jan 2, 2014
Tony Brown; DB	Recruit ratings: Scout: Rivals: 247Sports: ESPN:					
Joshua Casher; C	Mobile, Alabama	St. Paul's Episcopal School	6 ft 1 in (1.85 m)	280 lb (130 kg)	–	Oct 29, 2013
Joshua Casher; C	Recruit ratings: Scout: Rivals: 247Sports: ESPN:					
Ronnie Clark; DB	Calera, Alabama	Calera High School	6 ft 3 in (1.91 m)	205 lb (93 kg)	4.59	Oct 4, 2013
Ronnie Clark; DB	Recruit ratings: Scout: Rivals: 247Sports: ESPN:					
David Cornwell; QB	Norman, Oklahoma	Norman North High School	6 ft 5 in (1.96 m)	235 lb (107 kg)	–	Jun 14, 2013
David Cornwell; QB	Recruit ratings: Scout: Rivals: 247Sports: ESPN:					
Johnny Dwight; DT	Rochelle, Georgia	Wilcox County High School	6 ft 3 in (1.91 m)	298 lb (135 kg)	–	Jun 4, 2013
Johnny Dwight; DT	Recruit ratings: Scout: Rivals: 247Sports: ESPN:					
Rashaan Evans; LB	Auburn, Alabama	Auburn High School	6 ft 3 in (1.91 m)	218 lb (99 kg)	4.5	Feb 5, 2014
Rashaan Evans; LB	Recruit ratings: Scout: Rivals: 247Sports: ESPN:					
Ty Flournoy-Smith; TE	Moultrie, Georgia	Georgia Military College	6 ft 3 in (1.91 m)	245 lb (111 kg)	–	Feb 3, 2014
Ty Flournoy-Smith; TE	Recruit ratings: Scout: Rivals: 247Sports: ESPN:					
Joshua Frazier; DT	Springdale, Arkansas	Har-Ber High School	6 ft 3 in (1.91 m)	334 lb (151 kg)	5.10	Nov 23, 2013
Joshua Frazier; DT	Recruit ratings: Scout: Rivals: 247Sports: ESPN:					
Shaun Dion Hamilton; LB	Montgomery, Alabama	G. W. Carver High School	6 ft 0 in (1.83 m)	241 lb (109 kg)	–	Apr 17, 2013
Shaun Dion Hamilton; LB	Recruit ratings: Scout: Rivals: 247Sports: ESPN:					
Da'Shawn Hand; DE	Woodbridge, Virginia	Woodbridge High School	6 ft 4 in (1.93 m)	260 lb (120 kg)	4.70	Nov 14, 2013
Da'Shawn Hand; DE	Recruit ratings: Scout: Rivals: 247Sports: ESPN:					
J. C. Hassenauer; C	Woodbury, Minnesota	East Ridge High School	6 ft 3 in (1.91 m)	295 lb (134 kg)	5.35	Jun 17, 2013
J. C. Hassenauer; C	Recruit ratings: Scout: Rivals: 247Sports: ESPN:					
Keith Holcombe; LB	Tuscaloosa, Alabama	Hillcrest High School	6 ft 4 in (1.93 m)	209 lb (95 kg)	5.35	Jun 30, 2013
Keith Holcombe; LB	Recruit ratings: Scout: Rivals: 247Sports: ESPN:					
Marlon Humphrey; CB	Hoover, Alabama	Hoover High School	6 ft 0 in (1.83 m)	174 lb (79 kg)	–	Jan 29, 2014
Marlon Humphrey; CB	Recruit ratings: Scout: Rivals: 247Sports: ESPN:					
Dominick Jackson; OT	Cupertino, California	College of San Mateo	6 ft 7 in (2.01 m)	312 lb (142 kg)	–	Jun 26, 2013
Dominick Jackson; OT	Recruit ratings: Scout: Rivals: 247Sports: ESPN:					
Laurence Jones; DB	Monroe, Louisiana	Neville High School	6 ft 2 in (1.88 m)	210 lb (95 kg)	–	Jan 2, 2014
Laurence Jones; DB	Recruit ratings: Scout: Rivals: 247Sports: ESPN:					
Derek Kief; WR	Cincinnati, Ohio	La Salle High School	6 ft 4 in (1.93 m)	199 lb (90 kg)	–	Jun 16, 2013
Derek Kief; WR	Recruit ratings: Scout: Rivals: 247Sports: ESPN:					
Montel McBride; OG	Plant City, Florida	Plant City High School	6 ft 4 in (1.93 m)	332 lb (151 kg)	5.52	Jul 2, 2013
Montel McBride; OG	Recruit ratings: Scout: Rivals: 247Sports: ESPN:					
Christian Miller; LB	Columbia, South Carolina	Spring Valley High School	6 ft 4 in (1.93 m)	215 lb (98 kg)	–	Jul 25, 2013
Christian Miller; LB	Recruit ratings: Scout: Rivals: 247Sports: ESPN:					
D. J. Pettway; DT	Pensacola, Florida	East Mississippi Community College	6 ft 3 in (1.91 m)	255 lb (116 kg)	–	Dec 18, 2013
D. J. Pettway; DT	Recruit ratings: Scout: Rivals: 247Sports: ESPN:					
Ross Pierschbacher; OG	Cedar Falls, Iowa	Cedar Falls High School	6 ft 4 in (1.93 m)	295 lb (134 kg)	5.21	Aug 11, 2013
Ross Pierschbacher; OG	Recruit ratings: Scout: Rivals: 247Sports: ESPN:					
Jarran Reed; DT	Goldsboro, North Carolina	East Mississippi Community College	6 ft 4 in (1.93 m)	305 lb (138 kg)	–	Dec 19, 2013
Jarran Reed; DT	Recruit ratings: Scout: Rivals: 247Sports: ESPN:					
Cameron Robinson; OT	West Monroe, Louisiana	West Monroe High School	6 ft 6 in (1.98 m)	320 lb (150 kg)	–	Sep 4, 2013
Cameron Robinson; OT	Recruit ratings: Scout: Rivals: 247Sports: ESPN:					
Bo Scarbrough; RB	Northport, Alabama	IMG Academy	6 ft 2 in (1.88 m)	222 lb (101 kg)	4.50	Sep 7, 2012
Bo Scarbrough; RB	Recruit ratings: Scout: Rivals: 247Sports: ESPN:					
J. K. Scott; P	Denver, Colorado	Mullen High School	6 ft 5 in (1.96 m)	185 lb (84 kg)	–	Jun 9, 2013
J. K. Scott; P	Recruit ratings: Scout: Rivals: 247Sports: ESPN:					
Cam Sims; WR	Monroe, Louisiana	Ouachita Parish High School	6 ft 4 in (1.93 m)	208 lb (94 kg)	–	Aug 24, 2013
Cam Sims; WR	Recruit ratings: Scout: Rivals: 247Sports: ESPN:					
O. J. Smith; DT	Bossier City, Louisiana	Airline High School	6 ft 2 in (1.88 m)	330 lb (150 kg)	5.00	May 24, 2013
O. J. Smith; DT	Recruit ratings: Scout: Rivals: 247Sports: ESPN:					
Overall recruit ranking: Scout: 1 Rivals: 1 247Sports: 1 ESPN: 1
‡ Refers to 40-yard dash; Note: In many cases, Scout, Rivals, 247Sports, On3, and ESPN may conflict in their listings of height, weight and 40 time.; In these cases, the average was taken. ESPN grades are on a 100-point scale.; Sources: "Alabama Signee List 2014". Rivals.; "Scout.com Football Recruiting: Alabama". Scout.; "2014 Player Signees – Alabama". ESPN.; "Scout.com Team Recruiting Rankings". Scout.; "2014 Team Ranking". Rivals.com.

=== Departed players ===
Notable departures from the 2013 squad included juniors, Ha Ha Clinton-Dix, Adrian Hubbard, Cyrus Kouandjio, Jeoffrey Pagan, and Vinnie Sunseri who declared their eligibility for the 2014 NFL draft. Senior starters from the 2013 squad who exhausted their eligibility included A. J. McCarron, Kevin Norwood, and Anthony Steen on offense; Deion Belue, C. J. Mosley, and Ed Stinson on defense; and Cody Mandell, McCarron, and Cade Foster on special teams. Other notable departures from the 2013 squad included several players who transferred to another school. These transfers included quarterback Luke Del Rio to Oregon State, running back Dee Hart to Colorado State, and center Chad Lindsay to Ohio State.

=== Returning starters ===
Alabama had seven returning players on offense, five on defense and five on special teams that started games in 2013.

==== Offense ====
Player	Class	Position
Amari Cooper	Junior	Wide receiver
Christion Jones	Senior	Wide receiver
Ryan Kelly	Junior	Center
Arie Kouandjio	Senior	Offensive guard
Austin Shepherd	Senior	Offensive tackle
Brian Vogler	Senior	Tight end
T. J. Yeldon	Junior	Running back

==== Defense ====
Player	Class	Position
Trey DePriest	Senior	Linebacker
Landon Collins	Junior	Safety
A'Shawn Robinson	Sophomore	Defensive tackle
Brandon Ivory	Senior	Defensive tackle
Jarrick Williams	Senior	Defensive back

==== Special teams ====
Player	Class	Position
Christion Jones	Senior	Kickoff/Punt returner
DeAndrew White	Senior	Kickoff returner
Cole Mazza	Sophomore	Long Snapper

== Depth chart ==
The depth chart listed below shows starters and backups as announced in August 2014.

Defense

FS
Nick Perry
Geno Smith
Jabriel Washington
⋅

WLB	ILB	ILB	SLB
Denzel Devall	Reggie Ragland; Reuben Foster	Trey DePriest	Xzavier Dickson
Dillon Lee	Walker Jones	Shaun Dion Hamilton	Ryan Anderson
Rashaan Evans	⋅	⋅	⋅

SS
Landon Collins
Jarrick Williams
Hootie Jones

CB
Cyrus Jones
Tony Brown
⋅

DE	NT	DE
DJ Pettway	A'Shawn Robinson	Jonathan Allen; Dalvin Tomlinson
Da'Shawn Hand; Jarran Reed	Brandon Ivory; Darren Lake	Dee Liner
⋅	Joshua Frazier	Tim Williams

CB
Eddie Jackson
Maurice Smith
Marlon Humphrey
Anthony Averett

Offense

WR
Amari Cooper
ArDarius Stewart
Raheem Falkins
Cam Sims

LT	LG	C	RG	RT
Cameron Robinson	Arie Kouandjio	Ryan Kelly	Leon Brown	Austin Shepherd
Dominick Jackson	Ross Pierschbacher; Brandon Greene	Bradley Bozeman; Josh Casher	Alphonse Taylor	Grant Hill
⋅	⋅	⋅	⋅	⋅

TE
O. J. Howard
Brian Vogler
Dakota Ball
Ty Flournoy-Smith
Malcolm Faciane

WR
DeAndrew White
Christian Jones
Robert Foster
Chris Black
⋅

QB
Blake Sims
Jacob Coker
Alec Morris
Cooper Bateman
David Cornwell

RB
T. J. Yeldon
Derrick Henry
Kenyan Drake
Altee Tenpenny
Tyren Jones

FB
Jalston Fowler
Michael Nysewander
Kurt Freitag
Corey McCarron
⋅

Special teams
PK Adam Griffith
J. K. Scott
P J. K. Scott
P Alec Morris
KR Christion Jones
PR Christion Jones
LS Cole Mazza
H Cooper Bateman

== Schedule ==
The 2014 schedule was officially released on August 21, 2013. Alabama faced all six Western Division opponents: Arkansas, Auburn, LSU, Mississippi State, Ole Miss, and Texas A&M. They also faced two Eastern Division opponents: official SEC rival Tennessee and Florida. Alabama was not scheduled to play SEC opponents Georgia, Kentucky, Missouri, South Carolina or Vanderbilt during the regular season. They played four non-conference games: West Virginia of the Big 12 Conference, Florida Atlantic and Southern Miss of Conference USA and Western Carolina of the Southern Conference. On the final weekend of the regular season, a Missouri victory over Arkansas, coupled with a Mississippi State loss set up a SEC Championship Game against the Tigers for the Crimson Tide. On December 7, the selection committee for the College Football Playoff ranked Alabama as the top seed for the inaugural playoff. For their semifinal match-up, Alabama played Ohio State of the Big Ten Conference in the Sugar Bowl.

Date	Time	Opponent	Rank	Site	TV	Result	Attendance
August 30	2:30 p.m.	vs. West Virginia*	No. 2	Georgia Dome; Atlanta, GA (Chick-fil-A Kickoff Game)	ABC	W 33–23	70,502
September 6	11:00 a.m.	Florida Atlantic*	No. 2	Bryant–Denny Stadium; Tuscaloosa, AL	SECN	W 41–0 (Note: With 7:53 to play in the fourth quarter, officials delayed the game due to lightning strikes within ten miles of Bryant–Denny Stadium. Both schools subsequently agreed to call the game, and this resulted in the 41–0 Alabama victory.)	100,306
September 13	5:00 p.m.	Southern Miss*	No. 3	Bryant–Denny Stadium; Tuscaloosa, AL	ESPN2	W 52–12	101,821
September 20	2:30 p.m.	Florida	No. 3	Bryant–Denny Stadium; Tuscaloosa, AL (rivalry / SEC Nation)	CBS	W 42–21	101,821
October 4	2:30 p.m.	at No. 11 Ole Miss	No. 3	Vaught–Hemingway Stadium; Oxford, MS (rivalry) (College GameDay)	CBS	L 17–23	61,826
October 11	5:00 p.m.	at Arkansas	No. 7	Donald W. Reynolds Razorback Stadium; Fayetteville, AR (SEC Nation)	ESPN	W 14–13	72,337
October 18	2:30 p.m.	No. 21 Texas A&M	No. 7	Bryant–Denny Stadium; Tuscaloosa, AL	CBS	W 59–0	101,821
October 25	6:30 p.m.	at Tennessee	No. 4	Neyland Stadium; Knoxville, TN (Third Saturday in October)	ESPN2	W 34–20	102,455
November 8	7:00 p.m.	at No. 16 LSU	No. 4	Tiger Stadium; Baton Rouge, LA (rivalry / SEC Nation)	CBS	W 20–13 ^{OT}	102,321
November 15	2:30 p.m.	No. 1 Mississippi State	No. 5	Bryant–Denny Stadium; Tuscaloosa, AL (rivalry) (College GameDay)	CBS	W 25–20	101,821
November 22	3:00 p.m.	Western Carolina*^{†}	No. 1	Bryant–Denny Stadium; Tuscaloosa, AL	SECN	W 48–14	101,325
November 29	6:45 p.m.	No. 15 Auburn	No. 1	Bryant–Denny Stadium; Tuscaloosa, AL (Iron Bowl) (College GameDay)	ESPN	W 55–44	101,821
December 6	3:00 p.m.	vs. No. 16 Missouri	No. 1	Georgia Dome; Atlanta, GA (SEC Championship Game / SEC Nation)	CBS	W 42–13	73,526
January 1, 2015	7:30 p.m.	vs. No. 4 Ohio State*	No. 1	Mercedes-Benz Superdome; New Orleans, LA (Sugar Bowl–CFP Semifinal / SEC Nation)	ESPN	L 35–42	74,682
*Non-conference game; ^{†}Homecoming; Rankings from AP Poll and CFP Rankings after October 28 released prior to game; All times are in Central time

== Game summaries ==
=== West Virginia ===
West Virginia Mountaineers vs #2 Alabama Crimson Tide – Game summary

Quarter	1	2	3	4	Total
West Virginia	3	14	3	3	23
#2 Alabama	3	17	10	3	33

at Georgia Dome • Atlanta, GA

- Date: August 30, 2014
- Game time: 3:36 p.m. ET
- Game weather: Indoors
- Game attendance: 70,502
- Referee: David Epperley
- TV announcers (ABC): Dave Pasch (play-by-play), Brian Griese (color), Tom Luginbill (sideline)

Game information

First Quarter

- WVU – Josh Lambert, 20-yard field goal, 10:58 (WVU 3–0)
- ALA – Adam Griffith, 47-yard field goal, 8:18 (3–3)

Second Quarter

- ALA – T. J. Yeldon, 15-yard run (Adam Griffith kick), 14:11 (ALA 10–3)
- WVU – Kevin White, 19-yard pass from Clint Trickett (Josh Lambert kick), 11:58 (10–10)
- ALA – T. J. Yeldon, 1-yard run (Adam Griffith kick), 1:57 (ALA 17–10)
- WVU – Mario Alford, 100-yard kickoff return (Josh Lambert kick), 1:43 (17–17)
- ALA – Adam Griffith, 41-yard field goal, 0:00 (ALA 20–17)

Third Quarter

- ALA – Derrick Henry, 19-yard run (Adam Griffith kick), 7:44 (ALA 27–17)
- WVU – Josh Lambert, 42-yard field goal, 4:59 (ALA 27–20)
- ALA – Adam Griffith, 27-yard field goal, 1:27 (ALA 30–20)

Fourth Quarter

- WVU – Josh Lambert, 41-yard field goal, 13:37 (ALA 30–23)
- ALA – Adam Griffith, 45-yard field goal, 8:07 (ALA 33–23)

Top Passers

- WVU – Clint Trickett; 29–45, 365 yards, 1 TD
- ALA – Blake Sims; 24–33, 250 yards, 1 INT

Top Rushers

- WVU – Rushel Shell; 10 rushes, 38 yards
- ALA – T. J. Yeldon; 23 rushes, 126 yards, 2 TD

Top Receiving

- WVU – Kevin White; 9 receptions, 143 yards, 1 TD
- ALA – Amari Cooper; 12 receptions, 130 yards

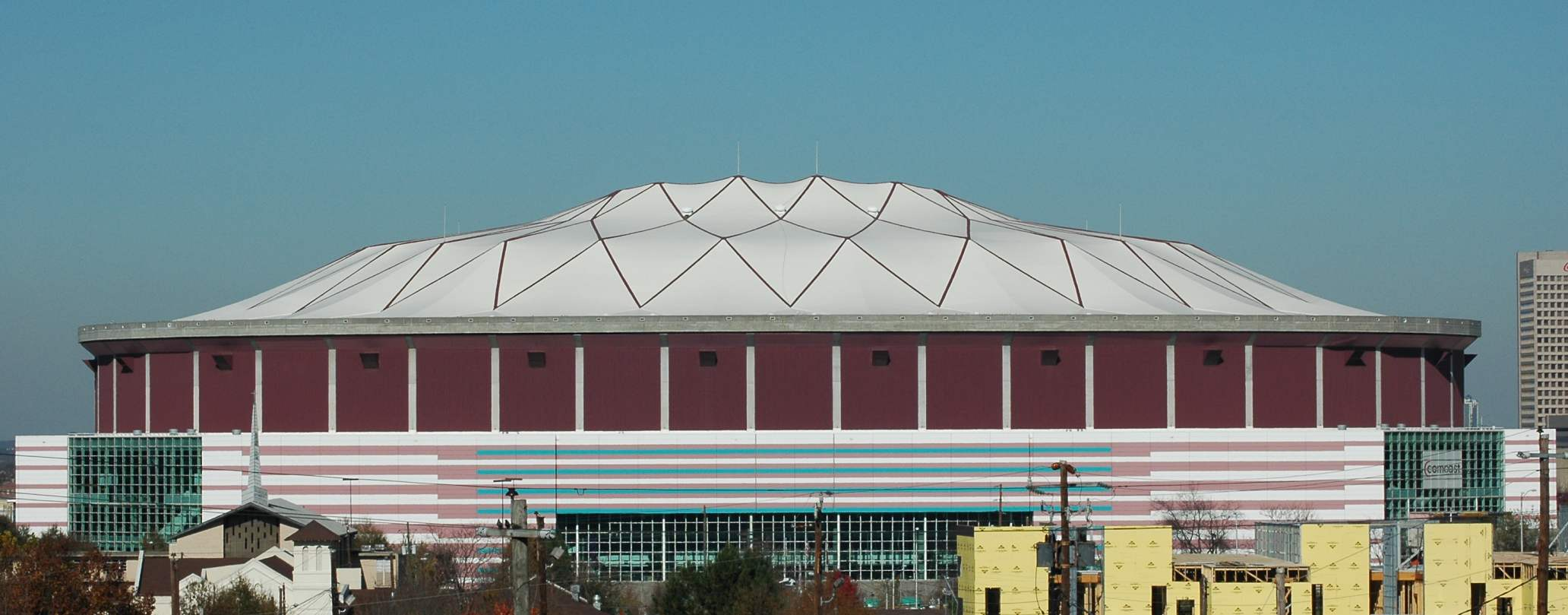
The game was held at the Georgia Dome in Atlanta.

On May 17, 2012, officials from both Alabama and West Virginia announced the Crimson Tide and the Mountaineers would meet for the first time to open the 2014 season in the Chick-fil-A College Kickoff at Atlanta. As they entered their game week preparations, Alabama head coach Nick Saban announced starting linebacker Trey DePriest would be suspended for the game due to an NCAA violation. Although Alabama entered the game as a heavy favorite over the Mountaineers, the Crimson Tide only defeated West Virginia by a score of 33–23 in what was Blake Sims first start at quarterback. After Alabama won the coin toss and deferred until the second half, West Virginia had a 14-play drive that took them as far as the Crimson Tide three-yard line. It was from the three that Josh Lambert gave the Mountaineers a 3–0 lead with his 20-yard field goal. Alabama responded on the next possession after Adam Griffith connected on a 47-yard field goal that tied the game 3–3. After the Crimson Tide defense forced a punt on the Mountaineers possession that followed, Alabama scored their first touchdown on the 95-yard drive that ensued. Behind a strong running attack, T. J. Yeldon gave the Crimson Tide a 10–3 lead with his 15-yard touchdown run early in the second quarter.

West Virginia responded on their next possession with a long touchdown drive of their own. Led by quarterback Clint Trickett, the Mountaineers went 75 yards in nine plays with Trickett throwing a 19-yard touchdown pass to Kevin White that tied the game 10–10. Late in the quarter, Alabama retook a 17–10 lead on a one-yard Yeldon touchdown run. However, on the kickoff that ensued, Mario Alford dodges several Crimson Tide tackles en route to a 100-yard touchdown run that tied the game 17–17. Alabama did respond with a quick, 50-yard drive that ended with a 41-yard Adam Griffith field goal that gave the Crimson Tide a 20–17 halftime lead.

After Alabama was stopped on a fourth-down conversion and the Mountaineers missed a 47-yard field goal on their opening possessions of the second half, the Crimson Tide took a 27–17 lead behind a 19-yard Derrick Henry touchdown run. Both teams then traded field goals on the next two possessions and made the score 30–20 in favor of the Crimson Tide as they entered the fourth quarter. Although only a pair of field goals were scored in the fourth that made the final score 33–23, the Alabama defense played its best quarter of the game and forced the Mountaineers into several three-and-out possessions late in the game. For his four field goal performance, Adam Griffith was recognized as both the SEC Special Teams Player of the Week and as a Lou Groza Award National Star of the Week.

=== Florida Atlantic ===
Florida Atlantic Owls at #3 Alabama Crimson Tide – Game summary

Quarter	1	2	3	4	Total
Florida Atlantic	0	0	0	0	0
#3 Alabama	21	10	7	3	41

at Bryant–Denny Stadium • Tuscaloosa, AL

- Date: September 6, 2014
- Game time: 11:01 A.M. CT
- Game weather: 88 °F (31 °C); fair with wind from the north at 5 mph
- Game attendance: 100,306
- Referee: Hubert Owens
- TV announcers (SEC Network): Dave Neal (play-by-play), Andre Ware (color), Laura Rutledge (sideline)

Game information

First quarter

- ALA – Blake Sims, 7-yard run (Adam Griffith kick), 12:31 (ALA 7–0)
- ALA – Amari Cooper, 52-yard pass from Blake Sims (Adam Griffith kick), 8:20 (ALA 14–0)
- ALA – Kenyan Drake, 39-yard pass from Blake Sims (Adam Griffith kick), 1:48 (ALA 21–0)

Second quarter

- ALA – Adam Griffith, 22-yard field goal, 12:31 (ALA 24–0)
- ALA – Jalston Fowler, 3-yard pass from Jacob Coker (Adam Griffith kick), 6:23 (ALA 31–0)

Third quarter

- ALA – Kenyan Drake, 3-yard run (Adam Griffith kick), 2:19 (ALA 38–0)

Fourth quarter

- ALA – Adam Griffith, 28-yard field goal, 12:02 (ALA 41–0)

Top passers

- FAU – Greg Hankerson; 12–19, 88 yards
- ALA – Blake Sims; 11–13, 214 yards, 2 TD
- ALA – Jacob Coker; 15–24, 202 yards, 1 TD

Top Rushers

- FAU – Jay Warren; 9 rushes, 56 yards
- ALA – Kenyan Drake; 7 rushes, 45 yards, 1 TD

Top receiving

- FAU – Lucky Whitehead; 6 receptions, 42 yards
- ALA – Amari Cooper; 13 receptions, 189 yards, 1 TD

To open their 2014 home schedule, Alabama defeated the Florida Atlantic Owls 41–0 in a game that was called midway through the fourth quarter due to lightning strikes within eight miles of Bryant–Denny Stadium. The Crimson Tide elected to receive the ball to open the game and then went on a seven-play, 74-yard drive that culminated in a seven-yard Blake Sims touchdown run. After the Alabama defense forced a punt on the Owls' first possession, Sims connected with Amari Cooper on a 52-yard touchdown pass for a 14–0 lead. The Crimson Tide extended their lead further to 21–0 on their next possession when Sims threw a 39-yard touchdown pass to Kenyan Drake. On the first defensive play that followed, Eddie Jackson forced a Kamrin Solomon fumble that was recovered by Reggie Ragland at the Owls' 42-yard line.

It was on this possession that backup quarterback Jacob Coker entered the game. He led the Crimson Tide on a 37-yard drive that resulted in a 24–0 lead after Adam Griffith connected on a 22-yard field goal early in the second quarter. The Alabama defense continued their strong performance and forced a three-and-out before the offense started their fourth touchdown drive of the game. Coker led the Crimson Tide on a 12-play, 87-yard drive that ended with a three-yard Corker touchdown pass to Jalston Fowler for a 31–0 lead. FAU responded with their longest drive of the game only to again have to punt. Alabama then had their final drive of the first half stall at the Owls' nine-yard line; that made the halftime score 31–0.

On the first Alabama possession of the third quarter, Eugene Fau recovered a Sims fumble at the FAU one-yard line and prevented another Crimson Tide touchdown. They scored their fifth touchdown on a three-yard Kenyan Drake touchdown run later in the third that extended their lead to 38–0. With many of Alabama's back-ups in the game, Adam Griffith scored the final points of the game with his 28-yard field goal. After Cyrus Jones set up a late Crimson Tide scoring opportunity with his 70-yard punt return, officials delayed the game due to lightning strikes in the vicinity of the stadium with Alabama in a fourth and goal situation. Within fifteen minutes of the delay, both schools agreed to call the game with 7:53 to play in the fourth quarter. The game marked the first in Alabama history where two quarterbacks had over 200 yards passing, and Cooper's 13 receptions also tied a Crimson Tide single-game record set by D. J. Hall in 2007. The victory improved Alabama's all-time record against the Owls to 2–0.

=== Southern Miss ===
Southern Miss Golden Eagles at #3 Alabama Crimson Tide – Game summary

Quarter	1	2	3	4	Total
Southern Miss	3	3	3	3	12
#3 Alabama	7	14	14	17	52

at Bryant–Denny Stadium • Tuscaloosa, AL

- Date: September 13, 2014
- Game time: 5:06 P.M. CT
- Game weather: 81 °F (27 °C); partly cloudy with wind from the north at 8 mph
- Game attendance: 101,821
- Referee: Matt Austin
- TV announcers (ESPN2): Joe Tessitore (play-by-play), Brock Huard (color), Shannon Spake (sideline)

Game information

First Quarter

- USM – Corey Acosta, 33-yard field goal, 11:35 (USM 3–0)
- ALA – Amari Cooper, 22-yard pass from Blake Sims (Adam Griffith kick), 7:42 (ALA 7–3)

Second Quarter

- ALA – Blake Sims, 4-yard run (Adam Griffith kick), 9:32 (ALA 14–3)
- ALA – Kenyan Drake, 1-yard run (Adam Griffith kick), 5:36 (ALA 21–3)
- USM – Corey Acosta, 43-yard field goal, 1:25 (ALA 21–6)

Third Quarter

- ALA – Kenyan Drake, 1-yard run (Adam Griffith kick), 12:06 (ALA 28–6)
- USM – Corey Acosta, 37-yard field goal, 8:15 (ALA 28–9)
- ALA – Brian Vogler, 5-yard pass from Blake Sims (Adam Griffith kick), 5:12 (ALA 35–9)

Fourth Quarter

- ALA – Kenyan Drake, 29-yard run (Adam Griffith kick), 13:48 (ALA 42–9)
- USM – Corey Acosta, 30-yard field goal, 9:50 (ALA 42–12)
- ALA – Adam Griffith, 30-yard field goal, 6:03 (ALA 45–12)
- ALA – Tyren Jones, 2-yard run (Adam Griffith kick), 0:16 (ALA 52–12)

Top Passers

- USM – Nick Mullens; 19–35, 207 yards
- ALA – Blake Sims; 12–17, 168 yards, 2 TD
- ALA – Jacob Coker; 5–7, 46 yards

Top Rushers

- USM – Tez Parks; 3 rushes, 25 yards
- ALA – Derrick Henry; 11 rushes, 73 yards
- ALA – Kenyan Drake; 9 rushes, 59 yards, 3 TD

Top Receiving

- USM – Markese Triplett; 5 receptions, 46 yards
- ALA – Amari Cooper; 8 receptions, 135 yards, 1 TD

In their third game of the 2014 season and second consecutive home non-conference game, Alabama defeated the Southern Miss Golden Eagles 52–12. Behind their passing game led by Nick Mullins, the Golden Eagles took a 3–0 lead behind a 33-yard Corey Acosta field goal on their opening possession. Alabama responded on the next possession with a 22-yard Blake Sims touchdown pass to Amari Cooper for a 7–3 lead. After a series of punts, the Crimson Tide extended their lead to 14–3 early in the second quarter behind a four-yard Sims touchdown run, and further to 21–3 on a one-yard Kenyan Drake touchdown run. Acosta then made the score 21–6 with his 43-yard field goal just prior to halftime.

To open the second half, Sims led the Crimson Tide 75 yards in eight-plays with Drake scoring his second touchdown for a 28–6 lead. Acosta connected on his third field goal on the drive that ensued for Southern Miss, but Alabama would go on and score on each of its final four offensive possessions for the 52–12 victory. After Sims completed a five-yard touchdown pass to Brian Vogler in the third, Jacob Coker entered the game on the following possession and led the Crimson Tide on three scoring drives in the fourth quarter. Points were scored by Drake on a 29-yard touchdown run, Adam Griffith on a 30-yard field goal and by Tyren Jones on a two-yard run. The win improved the Crimson Tide's record in the all-time series versus Southern Miss to 34–6–2 (36–5–2 without NCAA vacations and forfeits).

=== Florida ===
Florida Gators at #3 Alabama Crimson Tide – Game summary

Quarter	1	2	3	4	Total
Florida	14	0	7	0	21
#3 Alabama	14	7	14	7	42

at Bryant–Denny Stadium • Tuscaloosa, AL

- Date: September 20, 2014
- Game time: 2:40 p.m. CT
- Game weather: 85 °F (29 °C); clear with wind from the east at 6 mph
- Game attendance: 101,821
- Referee: Tom Ritter
- TV announcers (CBS): Verne Lundquist (play-by-play), Gary Danielson (color), Allie LaForce (sideline)

Game information

First Quarter

- ALA – Kenyan Drake, 87-yard pass from Blake Sims (Adam Griffith kick), 13:47 (ALA 7–0)
- FLA – Valdez Showers, 28-yard pass from Jeff Driskel (Francisco Valdez kick), 11:26 (7–7)
- FLA – Keanu Neal, 49-yard fumble return (Francisco Valdez kick), 9:24 (FLA 14–7)
- ALA – Amari Cooper, 79-yard pass from Blake Sims (Adam Griffith kick), 4:12 (14–14)

Second Quarter

- ALA – Jalston Fowler, 2-yard pass from Blake Sims (Adam Griffith kick), 7:19 (ALA 21–14)

Third Quarter

- FLA – Jeff Driskel, 14-yard run (Francisco Valdez kick), 12:42 (21–21)
- ALA – Derrick Henry, 3-yard run (Adam Griffith kick), 5:27 (ALA 28–21)
- ALA – Amari Cooper, 4-yard pass from Jacob Coker (Adam Griffith kick), 0:21 (ALA 35–21)

Fourth Quarter

- ALA – Amari Cooper, 6-yard pass from Blake Sims (Adam Griffith kick), 10:10 (ALA 42–21)

Top Passers

- FLA – Jeff Driskel; 9–28, 93 yards, 1 TD, 1 INT
- ALA – Blake Sims; 23–33, 445 yards, 4 TD, 1 INT

Top Rushers

- FLA – Jeff Driskel; 11 rushes, 59 yards, 1 TD
- ALA – Derrick Henry; 20 rushes, 111 yards, 1 TD

Top Receiving

- FLA – Clay Burton; 3 receptions, 33 yards
- ALA – Amari Cooper; 10 receptions, 201 yards, 3 TD

The Florida Gators surrendered a school-record 672 yards of total offense to the Crimson Tide in this 42–21 Alabama victory. Florida won the pregame toss and elected to receive. After they held Florida to a three-and-out, Alabama scored on its first play from scrimmage on an 87-yard touchdown pass from Blake Sims to Kenyan Drake. However, Drake lost a fumble on Alabama's next possession, and gave the Gators possession at the Alabama 31-yard line. A 28-yard touchdown pass from Jeff Driskel to Valdez Showers tied the game at 7–7. The Crimson Tide's next possession also ended in a lost fumble which was returned by Florida for a touchdown, and gave the Gators a 14–7 lead. On the possession that ensued, Alabama drove 52-yards to set up an Adam Griffith field goal, but Griffith missed the 45-yarder in his first missed field goal of the season. The Crimson Tide forced another Florida three-and-out and punt, and the Alabama offense immediately tied the game 14–14 on a 79-yard touchdown pass to Amari Cooper. On Florida's next possession, Alabama recorded its first interception of the season when Jabriel Washington picked-off a Driskel pass at the Alabama 13-yard line. The ensuing Tide possession ended in yet another fumble, this time by Sims, but the Tide defense held as Florida and Alabama exchanged punts. Alabama forced a fumble from Florida running back Matt Jones, to set up a 56-yard drive that ended in a touchdown pass from Sims to Jalston Fowler to regain the lead, and Alabama led by a touchdown at halftime, 21–14.

Continuing the theme of the game, Alabama turned the ball over again on the opening possession of the second half when a Blake Sims pass was batted into the air by a Florida defender and intercepted by Antonio Morrison. Two plays later, Driskel ran 14-yards for a touchdown and tied the game 21–21. Alabama used more than seven minutes and converted five third downs on its next possession and regained the lead on a three-yard Derrick Henry touchdown run. Florida punted again, and on Alabama's next possession Sims injured his shoulder on a 24-yard run. Backup Jacob Coker entered the game, but Alabama relied mostly on runs from Henry and T. J. Yeldon to move the ball to the Florida four-yard line. Coker threw a four-yard touchdown pass to Cooper and extended Alabama's lead to 35–21. Florida's next possession ended with Driskel's second interception of the day, this time to Landon Collins. After the interception, Sims reentered the game and led a 60-yard that ended in a touchdown pass to Cooper, that made the score 42–21.

Blake Sims's 445 passing yards were the second highest single-game passing total in Alabama history behind Scott Hunter's 1969 record, and his 484 yards of total offense (including 39 total yards rushing) broke Hunter's single-game total offense record. Additionally, Cooper became Alabama's all-time leader in touchdown receptions after he eclipsed the previous record of 18 set by Dennis Homan. The victory improved Alabama's all-time record against the Gators to 22–14 (23–14 without the NCAA vacation of the 2005 victory).

=== Ole Miss ===
#3 Alabama Crimson Tide at #11 Ole Miss Rebels – Game summary

Quarter	1	2	3	4	Total
#3 Alabama	0	14	3	0	17
#11 Ole Miss	3	0	7	13	23

at Vaught–Hemingway Stadium • Oxford, MS

- Date: October 4, 2014
- Game time: 2:39 p.m. CT
- Game weather: 63 °F (17 °C); sunny with wind from the northwest at 14 mph
- Game attendance: 61,826
- Referee: Matt Loeffler
- TV announcers (CBS): Verne Lundquist (play-by-play), Gary Danielson (color), Allie LaForce (sideline)

Game information

First Quarter

- MISS – Gary Wunderlich, 46-yard field goal, 13:17 (MISS 3–0)

Second Quarter

- ALA – Blake Sims, 1-yard run (Adam Griffith kick), 3:44 (ALA 7–3)
- ALA – Cyrus Jones, 17-yard fumble return (Adam Griffith kick), 0:42 (ALA 14–3)

Third Quarter

- MISS – Laquon Treadwell, 14-yard pass from Bo Wallace, (Gary Wunderlich kick), 7:20 (ALA 14–10)
- ALA – Adam Griffith, 44-yard field goal, 3:54 (ALA 17–10)

Fourth Quarter

- MISS – Vince Sanders, 34-yard pass from Bo Wallace, (Gary Wunderlich kick), 5:29 (Tied at 17–17)
- MISS – Jaylen Walton, 10-yard pass from Bo Wallace, (Andrew Fletcher kick blocked), 2:54 (MISS 23–17)

Top Passers

- ALA – Blake Sims; 19–31, 228 yards, 1 INT
- MISS – Bo Wallace; 18–31, 251 yards, 3 TD

Top Rushers

- ALA – T. J. Yeldon; 20 carries, 123 yards
- MISS – Jaylen Walton; 11 carries, 39 yards

Top Receiving

- ALA – Amari Cooper; 9 receptions, 91 yards
- MISS – Evan Engram; 3 receptions, 71 yards

In what was their first true road game of the season, Alabama was upset by the Ole Miss Rebels 23–17 at Oxford. After the Rebels elected to start the game on offense, Mark Dodson returned the opening kickoff 54-yards to the Alabama 39-yard line. After a first down run by Bo Wallace, Ole Miss didn't gain a single yard and settled for a Gary Wunderlich 46-yard field goal and gave Ole Miss an early 3–0 lead. Alabama responded by driving deep into Ole Miss territory, but Adam Griffith missed a 46-yard field goal. Ole Miss moved the ball easily before the drive stalled at the Alabama- 15, but Andrew Fletcher missed a chip shot 33-yard field goal. From there until 6:59 remaining in the second quarter both teams traded punts. Finally, Alabama managed to march 68 yards and Blake Sims gave Alabama a 7–3 lead with his touchdown run from one-yard out on fourth down. The Crimson Tide then extended their lead to 14–3 at halftime after Cyrus Jones forced a fumble by I'Tavius Mathers and returned it 17-yards for a touchdown.

Alabama opened the second half with a 14 play drive only to have Adam Griffith miss on a 51-yard field goal attempt. Ole Miss responded on the possession that ensued with Wallace connecting on a 50-yard pass to tight-end Evan Engram and on a 14-yard touchdown pass to Laquon Treadwell two plays later, that made the score 14–10. Alabama then drove to the Ole Miss 15, but two penalties moved them to the 29, but Griffith did connect on a 44-yard field goal attempt and extended the Alabama lead to 17–10 as they entered the fourth quarter. In the fourth, Alabama punted from their own 5 which was returned 9 yards to the Rebels' 44. After a 6-yard run by Jaylen Walton, Wallace connected with Engram for a 16-yard gain to the Alabama 34. Finally, the Rebels tied the game on the next play when Wallace connected with Vince Sanders on a 34-yard touchdown reception. The extra point tied the game at 17–17. On the kickoff that ensued, Channing Ward forced a Christion Jones fumble that was recovered by Kailo Moore at the Alabama 31-yard line. Five plays later the Rebels took a 23–17 lead after Wallace threw a 10-yard touchdown pass to Jaylen Walton, but Fletcher missed the extra point. Ole Miss then secured the win late in the quarter after Senquez Golson intercepted a Sims pass in the endzone to effectively end the game. The loss brought Alabama's all-time record against the Rebels to 48–10–2 (51–9–2 without NCAA vacations and forfeits).

=== Arkansas ===
#7 Alabama Crimson Tide at Arkansas Razorbacks – Game summary

Quarter	1	2	3	4	Total
#7 Alabama	0	7	0	7	14
Arkansas	0	6	7	0	13

at Donald W. Reynolds Razorback Stadium • Fayetteville, AR

- Date: October 11, 2014
- Game time: 5:00 p.m. CT
- Game weather: 53 °F (12 °C); overcast with wind from the ENE at 3 mph
- Game attendance: 72,337
- Referee: Penn Wagers
- TV announcers (ESPN): Joe Tessitore (play-by-play), Brock Huard (color), Shannon Spake (sideline)

Game information

Second Quarter

- ALA – T. J. Yeldon, 22-yard pass from Blake Sims, (Adam Griffith kick), 8:40 (ALA 7–0)
- ARK – Jonathan Williams, 3-yard run, (John Henson kick blocked), 3:47 (ALA 7–6)

Third Quarter

- ARK – AJ Derby, 54-yard pass from Brandon Allen, (John Henson), 4:43 kick (ARK 13–7)

Fourth Quarter

- ALA – DeAndrew White, 6-yard pass from Blake Sims, (Adam Griffith kick), 12:36 (ALA 14–13)

Top Passers

- ALA – Blake Sims; 11–21, 161 yards, 2 TD
- ARK – Brandon Allen; 21–40, 246 yards, 1 TD, 1 INT

Top Rushers

- ALA – T. J. Yeldon, 16 carries, 45 yards
- ARK – Jonathan Williams; 20 carries, 83 yards, 1 TD

Top Receiving

- ALA – DeAndrew White; 4 receptions, 33 yards, 1 TD
- ARK – AJ Derby; 4 receptions, 77 yards, 1 TD

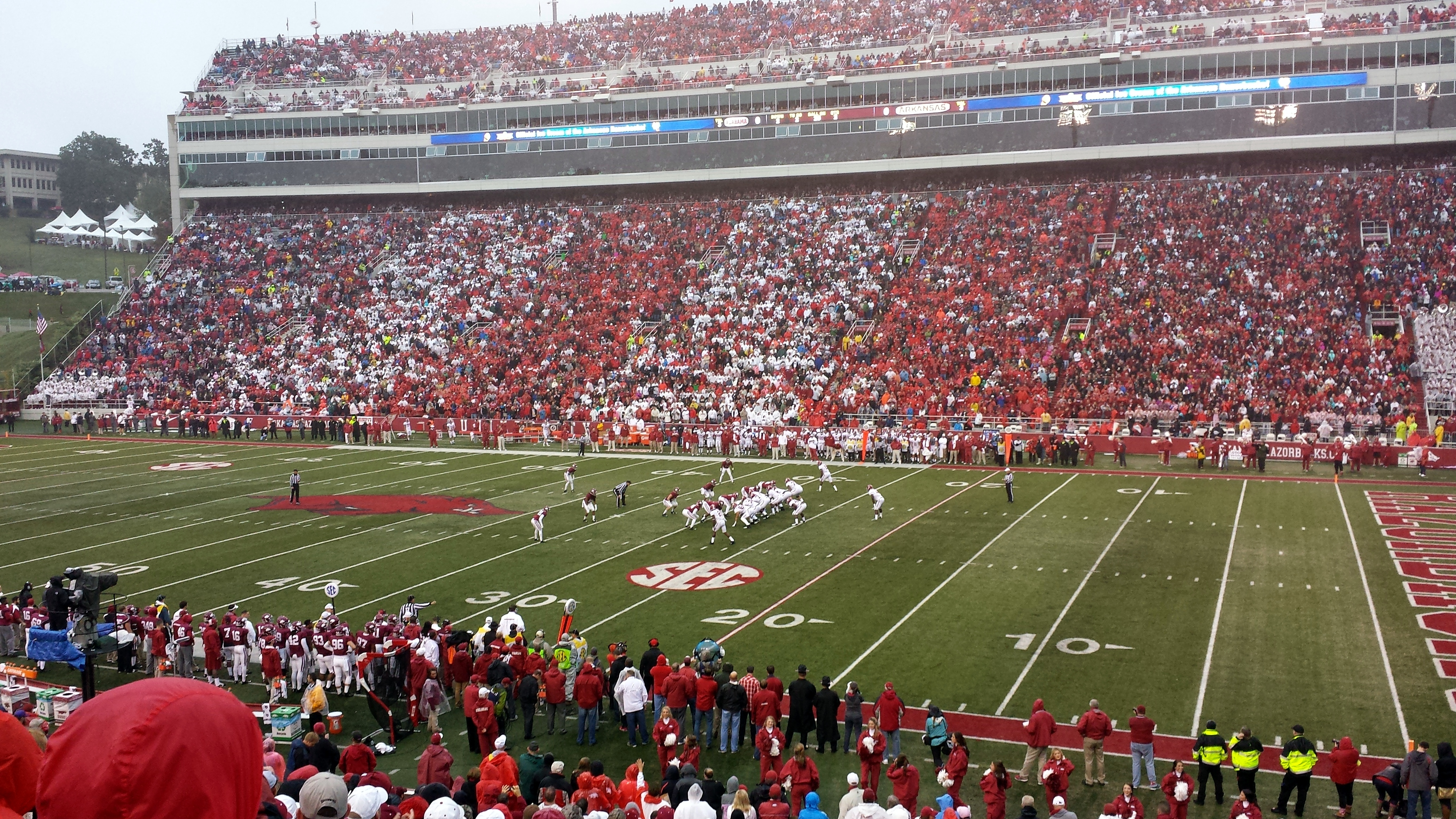
An early Crimson Tide drive

In the 2014 edition of their game against Arkansas, Alabama traveled to Fayetteville and defeated the Razorbacks 14–13 with a missed PAT providing for the winning margin. Each team committed a turnover to start the game. After the Alabama defense forced a three-and-out to open the game, Christion Jones fumbled the punt that followed that Arkansas recovered at the 31-yard line. On the Razorbacks' possession that ensued, Trey DePriest forced a Kody Walker fumble out of the endzone for a touchback. Neither team had another scoring opportunity in the quarter and the score was tied 0–0 at the end of the first. On their first possession of the second quarter, Adam Griffith missed a 30-yard field goal attempt. However, on the next play, A'Shawn Robinson forced an Alex Collins fumble that was recovered by Ryan Anderson at the Razorbacks' 23-yard line. Three plays later, Blake Sims threw a 22-yard touchdown pass to T. J. Yeldon for a 7–0 Crimson Tide lead. Arkansas responded on the next possession with an 81-yard drive that was capped with a three-yard Jonathan Williams touchdown run. Down by a single point, the John Henson PAT was blocked by Jonathan Allen and Alabama held a 7–6 lead into halftime.

Alabama retained their lead until midway through the third quarter, when Brandon Allen connected with AJ Derby on a 54-yard touchdown pass to give Arkansas a 13–7 lead. The Crimson Tide retook a 14–13 lead early in the fourth after Sims connected with DeAndrew White on a six-yard touchdown pass. Both defensed then controlled the remainder of the game with Landon Collins sealing the Crimson Tide victory late in the quarter after he intercepted an Allen pass. For his performance, J. K. Scott was named SEC Special Teams Player of the Week. The victory improved Alabama's all-time record against the Razorbacks to 15–8 (18–7 without NCAA vacations and forfeits).

=== Texas A&M ===
#21 Texas A&M Aggies at #7 Alabama Crimson Tide – Game summary

Quarter	1	2	3	4	Total
#21 Texas A&M	0	0	0	0	0
#7 Alabama	10	35	7	7	59

at Bryant–Denny Stadium • Tuscaloosa, AL

- Date: October 18, 2014
- Game time: 2:40 p.m. CT
- Game weather: 75 °F (24 °C); clear with wind from the N at 13 mph
- Game attendance: 101,821
- Referee: Matt Austin
- TV announcers (CBS): Verne Lundquist (play-by-play), Gary Danielson (color), Allie LaForce (sideline)

Game information

First Quarter

- ALA – Adam Griffith, 21-yard field goal, 11:07 (ALA 3–0)
- ALA – T. J. Yeldon, 9-yard run (Adam Griffith kick), 4:38 (ALA 10–0)

Second Quarter

- ALA – T. J. Yeldon, 1-yard run (Adam Griffith kick), 13:36 (ALA 17–0)
- ALA – Blake Sims, 43-yard run (Adam Griffith kick), 11:06 (ALA 24–0)
- ALA – Derrick Henry, 8-yard run (Adam Griffith kick), 5:26 (ALA 31–0)
- ALA – Amari Cooper, 21-yard pass from Blake Sims (Adam Griffith kick), 4:10 (ALA 38–0)
- ALA – Derrick Henry, 41-yard pass from Blake Sims (Adam Griffith kick), 0:22 (ALA 45–0)

Third Quarter

- ALA – Amari Cooper, 45-yard pass from Blake Sims (Adam Griffith kick), 11:47 (ALA 52–0)

Fourth Quarter

- ALA – Ty Flournoy-Smith, 14-yard from Jacob Coker (Adam Griffith kick), 4:16 (ALA 59–0)

Top Passers

- TA&M – Kenny Hill; 17–26; 138 yards, 1 INT
- ALA – Blake Sims; 16–27, 268 yards, 3 TDs

Top Rushers

- TA&M – Brandon Williams; 4 carries, 21 yards
- ALA – T. J. Yeldon; 13 carries, 114 yards, 2 TDs

Top Receiving

- TA&M – Josh Reynolds; 3 receptions, 42 yards
- ALA – Amari Cooper; 8 receptions, 140 yards, 2 TDs

In the second home conference game of the 2014 season, Alabama shellacked the Texas A&M Aggies 59–0 at Tuscaloosa behind a 35-point second quarter. The Crimson Tide scored on every possession of the first half en route to a 45–0 halftime lead. After Adam Griffith scored the first points of the game with his 21-yard field goal, T. J. Yeldon scored the first Alabama touchdown on a nine-yard run for a 10–0 lead at the end of the first quarter. Yeldon then opened the second quarter with a one-yard touchdown run for the first of 35 second-quarter points. Blake Sims and Derrick Henry then extended the Crimson Tide lead to 31–0 behind respective runs of 43 and eight-yards on consecutive possessions.

The next Alabama touchdown was set up after a 47-yard Christion Jones punt return gave the Crimson Tide possession at the A&M 24-yard line. On the next play, Sims threw a 24-yard touchdown pass to Amari Cooper, his first of three touchdown passes in the game. Sims then made the halftime score 45–0 after he connected with Henry on a 41-yard touchdown pass in the final minute of the half. The Crimson Tide then scored on their eighth consecutive possession to start the third quarter on a 45-yard Sims touchdown pass to Cooper. Alabama then scored their final points late in the game when Jacob Coker threw a 14-yard touchdown pass to Ty Flournoy-Smith for the 59–0 victory. The victory improved Alabama's all-time record against the Aggies to 5–2.

=== Tennessee ===
#6 Alabama Crimson Tide at Tennessee Volunteers – Game summary

Quarter	1	2	3	4	Total
#6 Alabama	20	7	7	0	34
Tennessee	0	10	7	3	20

at Neyland Stadium • Knoxville, TN

- Date: October 25, 2014
- Game time: 7:37 p.m. ET
- Game weather: 63 °F (17 °C); cloudy with wind from the SW at 4 mph
- Game attendance: 102,455
- Referee: Matt Moore
- TV announcers (ESPN2): Joe Tessitore (play-by-play), Brock Huard (color), Shannon Spake (sideline)

Game information

First Quarter

- ALA – Amari Cooper, 80-yard pass from Blake Sims (Adam Griffith kick failed), 12:39 (ALA 6–0)
- ALA – Amari Cooper, 41-yard pass from Blake Sims (Adam Griffith kick), 8:55 (ALA 13–0)
- ALA – T. J. Yeldon, 1-yard run (Adam Griffith kick), 3:12 (ALA 20–0)

Second Quarter

- ALA – Blake Sims, 28-yard run (Adam Griffith kick), 12:03 (ALA 27–0)
- UT – Josh Malone, 9-yard pass from Joshua Dobbs (Aaron Medley kick), 7:03 (ALA 27–7)
- UT – Aaron Medley, 27-yard field goal, 0:00 (ALA 27–10)

Third Quarter

- UT – Von Pearson, 9-yard pass from Joshua Dobbs (Aaron Medley kick), 5:52 (ALA 27–17)
- ALA – Derrick Henry, 28-yard run (Adam Griffith kick), 0:13 (ALA 34–17)

Fourth Quarter

- UT – Aaron Medley, 24-yard field goal, 9:42 (ALA 34–20)

Top Passers

- UT – Joshua Dobbs; 19–32; 192 yards, 2TDs, 1 INT
- ALA – Blake Sims; 14–24, 286 yards, 2 TDs

Top Rushers

- UT – Joshua Dobbs; 19 carries, 75 yards
- ALA – Derrick Henry; 16 carries, 78 yards, 1 TD

Top Receiving

- UT – Jalen Hurd; 6 receptions, 27 yards
- ALA – Amari Cooper; 9 receptions, 224 yards, 2 TDs

In their annual rivalry game, Amari Cooper set the single-game receiving yardage record as Alabama defeated Tennessee 34–20 for their eighth consecutive win over the Volunteers. The Crimson Tide opened the game with a pair of long Cooper touchdown receptions as they took a 13–0 lead. On Alabama's first offensive play, Blake Sims connected with him on an 80-yard scoring pass and again on their second drive from 41-yards out. They then extended their lead to 20–0 on their third offensive possession on a one-yard T. J. Yeldon touchdown run. Early in the second quarter, Reggie Ragland forced a Joshua Dobbs fumble that was recovered by Eddie Jackson and returned to the Vols' 19-yard line. Three plays after a Jarran Reed personal foul penalty pushed the ball back to the 34, Sims scored on a 28-yard touchdown run for a 27–0 lead.

Tennessee responded on their next two offensive possessions to close the half and cut the Alabama lead to 27–10 at halftime. First, Dobbs led Tennessee on an 84-yard scoring drive capped with his nine-yard touchdown pass to Josh Malone. He then led them on a 59-yard drive and Aaron Medley connected on a 27-yard field goal as time expired. After their defense forced an Alabama punt to open the third quarter, Tennessee scored on their third consecutive possession on a nine-yard Dobbs touchdown pass to Von Pearson that made the score 27–17. The Crimson Tide responded on the possession hat ensued with a 28-yard Derrick Henry touchdown run that extended their lead to 34–17.

In the final quarter, Cyrus Jones intercepted a Dobbs pass and returned it to the Alabama 30-yard line. However, on the play that ensued, Sims fumbled and the Vols regained possession at the Crimson Tide 23. Six plays later, Medley connected on a 24-yard field goal that made the score 34–20. Alabama responded with a long drive, but did not score as Cameron Sutton forced a Jalston Fowler fumble that was recovered by the Vols' Jalen Reeves-Maybin at their one-yard line. This resulted in the final score of 34–20. The 224 yards receiving in the game established a new Crimson Tide record and for his performance, Cooper was recognized as the SEC Co-Offensive Player of the Week alongside Mississippi State's Josh Robinson. The victory improved Alabama's all-time record against the Vols to 51–38–7 (52–37–8 without NCAA vacations and forfeits).

=== LSU ===
#5 Alabama Crimson Tide at #16 LSU Tigers – Game summary

Quarter	1	2	3	4	OT	Total
#5 Alabama	0	10	0	3	7	20
#16 LSU	7	0	3	3	0	13

at Tiger Stadium • Baton Rouge, LA

- Date: November 8, 2014
- Game time: 7:12 p.m. CT
- Game weather: 59 °F (15 °C); cloudy with wind from the WNW at 2–4 mph
- Game attendance: 102,321
- Referee: Tom Ritter
- TV announcers (CBS): Verne Lundquist (play-by-play), Gary Danielson (color), Allie LaForce (sideline)

Game information

First Quarter

- LSU – Malachi Dupre, 14-yard pass from Anthony Jennings (Colby Delahoussaye kick), 2:07 (LSU 7–0)

Second Quarter

- ALA – Amari Cooper, 23-yard pass from Blake Sims (Adam Griffith kick), 5:40 (7–7)
- ALA – Adam Griffith, 39-yard field goal, 0:09 (ALA 10–7)

Third Quarter

- LSU – Colby Delahoussaye, 35-yard field goal, 9:20 (10–10)

Fourth Quarter

- LSU – Colby Delahoussaye, 39-yard field goal, 0:50 (LSU 13–10)
- ALA – Adam Griffith, 27-yard field goal, 0:03 (13–13)

Overtime

- ALA – DeAndrew White, 6-yard pass from Blake Sims (Adam Griffith kick), (ALA 20–13)

Top Passers

- ALA – Blake Sims; 20–45, 209 yards, 2 TD
- LSU – Anthony Jennings; 8–26, 76 yards, 1 TD, 1 INT

Top Rushers

- ALA – T. J. Yeldon; 15 carries, 68 yards
- LSU – Leonard Fournette; 21 carries, 79 yards

Top Receiving

- ALA – Amari Cooper; 8 receptions, 83 yards, 1 TD
- LSU – Travin Dural; 3 receptions, 25 yards

In their annual rivalry game, Alabama defeated the LSU Tigers in overtime at Baton Rouge by a final score of 20–13. After each defense forced punts on the opening five possessions, LSU took advantage of a very short field, marching 41 yards, taking a 7–0 lead behind a 14-yard Anthony Jennings touchdown pass to Malachi Dupre. Late in the first quarter, after both teams punted, Alabama drove all the way to the 10-yard line where the drive stalled and Griffith missed a 27-yard field goal. After LSU punted on their next drive, the Crimson Tide tied the game 7–7 when Blake Sims threw a 23-yard touchdown pass to Amari Cooper in the second quarter. With just under a minute left in the half, Eddie Jackson intercepted a Jennings pass and returned it 18 yards back to the Tigers' 29-yard line. Although he missed one earlier from 27-yards out, Adam Griffith then gave the Crimson Tide a 10–7 halftime lead with his 39-yard field goal.

LSU took the second-half kickoff and reached the 18-yard line where Colby Delahoussaye tied the game 10–10 with his 35-yard field goal. The next seven possessions ended in punts which lasted until a minute remaining in the fourth quarter. With just over one minute remaining in the game, Lamar Louis forced a T. J. Yeldon fumble that was recovered by Kendell Beckwith at the Alabama six-yard line. After a very critical unsportsmanlike conduct penalty and two short runs, Delahoussaye gave the Tigers a 13–10 lead with just under a minute remaining in regulation with his 39-yard field goal. Alabama got a break when the kickoff went out-of-bounds, giving them the ball at their own- 35. Sims then proceeded to drive the Crimson Tide 55 yards in nine plays, converting two third downs with his legs, where Griffith tied the game 13–13 with his 27-yard field goal and sent the game into overtime.

Alabama took a 20–13 lead in the first overtime period when Sims connected with DeAndrew White on a six-yard touchdown reception. The Tigers were unable to respond on their overtime possession as four straight incompletions gave the Crimson Tide the 20–13 win. The victory improved Alabama's all-time record against the Tigers to 49–25–5.

=== Mississippi State ===
#1 Mississippi State Bulldogs at #5 Alabama Crimson Tide – Game summary

Quarter	1	2	3	4	Total
#1 Mississippi State	0	3	3	14	20
#5 Alabama	5	14	0	6	25

at Bryant–Denny Stadium • Tuscaloosa, AL

- Date: November 15, 2014
- Game time: 2:40 p.m. CT
- Game weather: 51 °F (11 °C); clear with wind from the SSE at 6 mph
- Game attendance: 101,821
- Referee: Matt Moore
- TV announcers (CBS): Verne Lundquist (play-by-play), Gary Danielson (color), Allie LaForce (sideline)

Game information

First Quarter

- ALA – Trey DePriest, safety, 7:49 (ALA 2–0)
- ALA – Adam Griffith, 36-yard field goal, 2:06 (ALA 5–0)

Second Quarter

- ALA – Amari Cooper, 4-yard pass from Blake Sims (Adam Griffith kick), 7:45 (ALA 12–0)
- ALA – Derrick Henry, 1-yard run (Adam Griffith kick), 5:32 (ALA 19–0)
- MSU – Evan Sobiesk, 23-yard field goal, 0:03 (ALA 19–3)

Third Quarter

- MSU – Evan Sobiesk, 32-yard field goal, 12:06 (ALA 19–6)

Fourth Quarter

- MSU – Fred Ross, 4-yard pass from Dak Prescott (Evan Sobiesk kick), 14:16 (ALA 19–13)
- ALA – T. J. Yeldon, 7-yard run (Blake Sims pass failed), 8:09 (ALA 25–13)
- MSU – Jameon Lewis, 4-yard pass from Dak Prescott (Evan Sobiesk kick), 0:15 (ALA 25–20)

Top Passers

- MSU – Dak Prescott; 27–48; 290 yards, 2TDs, 3 INTs
- ALA – Blake Sims; 19–31, 211 yards, 1 TD

Top Rushers

- MSU – Dak Prescott; 22 carries, 82 yards
- ALA – T. J. Yeldon; 16 carries, 72 yards, 1 TD

Top Receiving

- MSU – De'Runnya Wilson; 8 receptions, 91 yards
- ALA – Amari Cooper; 8 receptions, 88 yards, 1 TD

In their annual rivalry game, Alabama defeated the No. 1 ranked Mississippi State Bulldogs 25–20 at Tuscaloosa. After the teams traded punts on the first three possessions of the game, Trey DePriest gave the Crimson Tide a 2–0 lead when he tackled Josh Robinson in the endzone for a safety. On the possession that followed the free kick, Adam Griffith extended Alabama's lead to 5–0 with his 36-yard field goal. The Crimson Tide then scored their first touchdown midway through the second quarter when Blake Sims hit Amari Cooper for a four-yard touchdown pass and extended their lead to 12–0. On their next offensive series, Sims threw a 50-yard completion and Derrick Henry scored from one-yard out that extended the Crimson Tide lead to 19–0. The Bulldogs responded with a 14-play, 70-yard drive that was capped with a 23-yard Evan Sobiesk field goal that made the halftime score 19–3.

State opened the third quarter with another long drive, but again were only held to a Sobiesk field goal. Later in the quarter, with the Bulldogs in scoring position, Cyrus Jones intercepted a Dak Prescott pass for a touchback and ended the scoring threat. Early in the fourth quarter, Prescott threw a four-yard touchdown pass to Fred Ross that brought the score to 19–13. Alabama responded on their possession that followed with a 15-play, 76-yard drive that was capped with a seven-yard T. J. Yeldon touchdown run for a 25–13 Crimson Tide lead. The Bulldogs did score once more late in the final minute on a four-yard Jameon Lewis touchdown reception from Prescott, but were unable to recover the onside kick and Alabama won 25–20. The victory improved Alabama's all-time record against the Bulldogs to 77–18–3 (79–17–3 without NCAA vacations and forfeits).

=== Western Carolina ===
Western Carolina Catamounts at #1 Alabama Crimson Tide – Game summary

Quarter	1	2	3	4	Total
Western Carolina	7	7	0	0	14
#1 Alabama	10	28	10	0	48

at Bryant–Denny Stadium • Tuscaloosa, AL

- Date: November 22, 2014
- Game time: 3:01 p.m. CT
- Game weather: 68 °F (20 °C); hazy with wind at 8 mph
- Game attendance: 101,325
- Referee: Ken Williamson
- TV announcers (SEC Network): Brent Musburger (play-by-play), Jesse Palmer (color), Maria Taylor (sideline)

Game information

First Quarter

- WCU – Spearman Robinson, 2-yard pass from Troy Mitchell (Richard Sigmon kick), 11:57 (WCU 7–0)
- ALA – Cam Sims, 4-yard pass from Blake Sims (Gunnar Raborn kick), 7:51 (7–7)
- ALA – Gunnar Raborn, 20-yard field goal, 4:08 (ALA 10–7)

Second Quarter

- ALA – Derrick Henry, 10-yard run (Gunnar Raborn kick), 12:31 (ALA 17–7)
- WCU – Spearman Robinson, 12-yard pass from Troy Mitchell (Richard Sigmon kick), 10:41 (ALA 17–14)
- ALA – Tyren Jones, 7-yard run (Gunnar Raborn kick), 6:44 (ALA 24–14)
- ALA – Derrick Henry, 23-yard run (Gunnar Raborn kick), 3:16 (ALA 31–14)
- ALA – Derrick Henry, 9-yard pass from Blake Sims (Gunnar Raborn kick), 0:48 (ALA 38–14)

Third Quarter

- ALA – Gunnar Raborn, 28-yard field goal, 10:10 (ALA 41–14)
- ALA – Michael Nysewander, 12-yard pass from Jacob Coker (Gunnar Raborn kick), 1:49 (ALA 48–14)

Top Passers

- WCU – Troy Mitchell; 23–39; 221 yards, 2TDs
- ALA – Blake Sims; 17–25, 222 yards, 2 TDs, 1 INT

Top Rushers

- WCU – Darius Ramsey; 4 carries, 10 yards
- ALA – Derrick Henry; 12 carries, 92 yards, 2 TDs

Top Receiving

- WCU – Karnorris Benson; 9 receptions, 118 yards
- ALA – Chris Black; 6 receptions, 101 yards

On homecoming in Tuscaloosa, Alabama defeated the Western Carolina Catamounts of the Southern Conference 48–14.

The victory improved Alabama's all-time record against the Catamounts to 3–0 (4–0 without an NCAA vacation).

=== Auburn ===
#15 Auburn Tigers at #1 Alabama Crimson Tide – Game summary

Quarter	1	2	3	4	Total
#15 Auburn	6	20	10	8	44
#1 Alabama	14	7	13	21	55

at Bryant–Denny Stadium • Tuscaloosa, AL

- Date: November 29, 2014
- Game time: 6:52 p.m. CT
- Game weather: 60 °F (16 °C); cloudy with wind from the S at 12 mph
- Game attendance: 101,821
- Referee: Hubert Owens
- TV announcers (ESPN): Brent Musburger (play-by-play), Jesse Palmer (color), Maria Taylor (sideline)

Game information

First Quarter

- ALA – T. J. Yeldon, 8-yard run (Gunnar Raborn kick), 12:47 (ALA 7–0)
- AUB – Daniel Carlson, 20-yard field goal, 8:08 (ALA 7–3)
- ALA – Amari Cooper, 17-yard pass from Blake Sims (Gunnar Raborn kick), 6:17 (ALA 14–3)
- AUB – Daniel Carlson, 24-yard field goal, 2:57 (ALA 14–6)

Second Quarter

- AUB – Daniel Carlson, 24-yard field goal, 11:01 (ALA 14–9)
- AUB – Sammie Coates, 34-yard pass from Nick Marshall (Daniel Carlson kick), 10:16 (AUB 16–14)
- ALA – T. J. Yeldon, 1-yard run (Gunnar Raborn kick), 1:23 (ALA 21–16)
- AUB – Sammie Coates, 68-yard pass from Nick Marshall (Daniel Carlson kick), 0:54 (AUB 23–21)
- AUB – Daniel Carlson, 20-yard field goal, 0:00 (AUB 26–21)

Third Quarter

- AUB – Quan Bray, 5-yard pass from Nick Marshall (Daniel Carlson kick), 11:02 (AUB 33–21)
- ALA – Amari Cooper, 39-yard pass from Blake Sims (Gunnar Raborn kick blocked), 8:01 (AUB 33–27)
- AUB – Daniel Carlson, 33-yard field goal, 3:30 (AUB 36–27)
- ALA – Amari Cooper, 75-yard pass from Blake Sims (Adam Griffith kick), 3:20 (AUB 36–34)

Fourth Quarter

- ALA – Blake Sims, 11-yard run (DeAndrew White pass from Blake Sims), 14:33 (ALA 42–36)
- ALA – DeAndrew White, 6-yard pass from Blake Sims (Blake Sims rush failed), 8:05 (ALA 48–36)
- ALA – Derrick Henry, 25-yard run (Adam Griffith kick), 3:46 (ALA 55–36)
- AUB – Corey Grant, 5-yard run (Nick Marshall rush), 0:20 (ALA 55–44)

Top Passers

- AUB – Nick Marshall; 27–43; 456 yards, 3 TDs, 1 INT
- ALA – Blake Sims; 20–27, 312 yards, 4 TDs, 3 INTs

Top Rushers

- AUB – Cameron Artis-Payne; 25 carries, 77 yards
- ALA – T. J. Yeldon; 19 carries, 127 yards, 2 TDs

Top Receiving

- AUB – D'haquille Williams; 7 receptions, 121 yards
- AUB – Sammie Coates; 5 receptions, 206 yards, 2 TDs
- ALA – Amari Cooper; 13 receptions, 224 yards, 3 TDs

In the 2014 edition of the Iron Bowl, Alabama defeated the Auburn Tigers 55–44 at Tuscaloosa in what was the highest scoring game between the rivals. On the opening kickoff, the Crimson Tide failed to recover an onside kick and gave Auburn good field position to start the game. On the next play, the Tigers turned the ball over on a failed lateral pass from Nick Marshall to Roc Thomas. Five plays later, the Crimson Tide took a 7–0 lead behind an eight-yard T. J. Yeldon touchdown run. Alabama scored their second touchdown on a 17-yard Amari Cooper reception from Blake Sims after Daniel Carlson converted a 20-yard field goal that made the score 14–3. Auburn then a 16–14 behind a pair of 24-yard Carlson field goals and a 34-yard Nick Marshall touchdown pass to Sammie Coates. The Crimson Tide then briefly took a 21–16 behind a one-yard Yeldon touchdown run before Auburn scored ten points en route to a 26–21 halftime lead. First Marshall threw a 68-yard touchdown pass to Coates, and after Sims threw a late interception Carlson connected on a 20-yard field goal as time expired in the second quarter.

On their second play of the third quarter, Sims threw his third interception of the game, and on the Auburn drive that ensued they took a 33–21 behind a five-yard Marshall touchdown pass to Quan Bray. The Crimson Tide responded on their next possession with a 39-yard Sims touchdown pass to Cooper and the Tigers followed with a 33-yard Carlson field goal for a 36–27 Tigers lead. After this, the Crimson Tide scored touchdowns on their next four possessions and took a 55–36 lead into the final minutes of the game. After Cooper scored on a 75-yard touchdown reception, Nick Perry intercepted a Marshall pass for the Alabama defense. Five plays later Sims scored on a five-yard touchdown run and completed the two-point conversion pass to DeAndrew White.

On the Auburn possession that followed, Marshall was unable to make a third-down conversion and the ball was punted back to Alabama. The Crimson Tide then extended their lead further when Sims connected with DeAndrew White on a six-yard touchdown pass. The Crimson Tide defense then forced a change of possession on the next Tigers possession. On the drive that ensued, Derrick Henry had a 49-yard run and followed it two plays later with a 25-yard touchdown run for a 55–36 Crimson Tide lead. A five-yard Corey Grant touchdown run for Auburn in the final minute made the final score 55–44 in favor of Alabama. With his 13 receptions, 224 yards receiving and three touchdown receptions, Cooper tied the Alabama single-game record for all three categories. The victory improved Alabama's all-time record against the Tigers to 43–35–1.

=== Missouri ===
#1 Alabama Crimson Tide vs. #16 Missouri Tigers – Game summary

Quarter	1	2	3	4	Total
#1 Alabama	7	14	0	21	42
#16 Missouri	0	3	10	0	13

at Georgia Dome • Atlanta, GA

- Date: December 6, 2014
- Game time: 4:12 p.m. ET
- Game weather: Indoors
- Game attendance: 73,526
- Referee: Tom Ritter
- TV announcers (CBS): Verne Lundquist (play-by-play), Gary Danielson (color), Allie LaForce (sideline)

Game information

First Quarter

- ALA – T. J. Yeldon, 1-yard run (Adam Griffith kick), 11:24 (ALA 7–0)

Second Quarter

- ALA – DeAndrew White, 58-yard pass from Blake Sims (Adam Griffith kick), 11:48 (ALA 14–0)
- MIZZ – Andrew Baggett, 33-yard field goal, 8:30 (ALA 14–3)
- ALA – T. J. Yeldon, 2-yard run (Adam Griffith kick), 2:47 (ALA 21–3)

Third Quarter

- MIZZ – Bud Sasser, 1-yard pass from Maty Mauk (Andrew Baggett kick), 11:00 (ALA 21–10)
- MIZZ – Andrew Baggett, 33-yard field goal, 4:37 (ALA 21–13)

Fourth Quarter

- ALA – Christion Jones, 6-yard pass from Blake Sims (Adam Griffith kick), 14:55 (ALA 28–13)
- ALA – Derrick Henry, 26-yard run (Adam Griffith kick), 7:38 (ALA 35–13)
- ALA – Derrick Henry, 1-yard run (Adam Griffith kick), 3:38 (ALA 42–13)

Top Passers

- MIZZ – Maty Mauk; 16–34; 272 yards, 1 TD
- ALA – Blake Sims; 23–27, 262 yards, 2 TDs

Top Rushers

- MIZZ – Rus Hansbrough; 13 carries, 21 yards
- ALA – Derrick Henry; 20 carries, 141 yards, 2 TDs
- ALA – T. J. Yeldon; 14 carries, 47 yards, 2 TDs

Top Receiving

- MIZZ – Jimmie Hunt; 6 receptions, 169 yards
- ALA – DeAndrew White; 4 receptions, 101 yards, 1 TD
- ALA – Amari Cooper; 12 receptions, 83 yards

In the 2014 edition of the SEC Championship Game, Alabama defeated the Eastern Division champions Missouri Tigers 42–13 and captured their 24th SEC football championship. The victory improved Alabama's all-time record against the Tigers to 3–2.

== CFP Playoff ==
=== Ohio State (Sugar Bowl – CFP Semifinal) ===
#1 Alabama Crimson Tide vs. #4 Ohio State Buckeyes – Game summary

Quarter	1	2	3	4	Total
#4 Ohio State	6	14	14	8	42
#1 Alabama	14	7	7	7	35

at Mercedes-Benz Superdome • New Orleans, LA

- Date: January 1, 2015
- Game time: 8:01 p.m. CT
- Game weather: N/A (Indoor Stadium)
- Game attendance: 74,682
- Referee: Land Clark
- TV announcers (ESPN): Brad Nessler (play-by-play), Todd Blackledge (color), Holly Rowe (sideline)

Game information

First Quarter

Second Quarter

Third Quarter

Fourth Quarter

Top Passers

- OSU –
- ALA – Blake Sims, 22/36 237 yds, 2 TDs, 3INTs

Top Rushers

- OSU –
- ALA –

Top Receiving

- OSU –
- ALA –

The day after their victory in the SEC Championship Game, Alabama was selected as the No. 1 seed for the inaugural College Football Playoff and played Ohio State in the Sugar Bowl on Thursday, January 1, 2015, for their semi-final match-up. Alabama defeated Ohio State in their previous meeting 24–17 in the 1995 Florida Citrus Bowl and led the all-time series 3–0 before this game. Ohio State was ranked No. 5 in the AP Poll and No. 4 in the College Football Playoff. In the 2015 Sugar Bowl (CFP Semifinal Game), Alabama was defeated by the Ohio State Buckeyes by a score of 42–35.

== Rankings ==
Entering the 2014 football season, the Crimson Tide were ranked No. 2 in both the AP and Coaches' Preseason Polls.

Ranking movements Legend: ██ Increase in ranking ██ Decrease in ranking ( ) = First-place votes
	Week																
Poll	Pre	1	2	3	4	5	6	7	8	9	10	11	12	13	14	15	Final
AP	2 (1)	2 (1)	3 (1)	3 (1)	3 (6)	3 (13)	7	7	4	3	4	4	2 (16)	2 (21)	1 (25)	1 (27)	4
Coaches	2	2	2	2 (1)	2 (11)	1 (15)	7	7	4	3	4	3	2 (17)	1 (25)	1 (28)	1 (28)	4
CFP	Not released									6	5	5	1	1	1	1	Not released

== After the regular season ==
=== Awards ===
After the SEC Championship Game, multiple Alabama players were recognized for their on-field performances with a variety of awards and recognitions. At the team awards banquet on December 7, Landon Collins, Amari Cooper, Jalston Fowler and Blake Sims were each named the permanent captains of the 2014 squad. At that time Cooper was also named the 2014 most valuable player with Collins and Trey DePriest named defensive players of the year and Cooper and Sims named offensive players of the year.

==== Conference ====
The SEC recognized several players for their individual performances with various awards. Amari Cooper was named SEC Offensive Player of the Year by the Associated Press. On December 8, Cooper, Landon Collins, Arie Kouandjio, Jonathan Allen, Reggie Ragland and JK Scott were named to the AP All-SEC First Team. Blake Sims, Austin Shepherd and Cyrus Jones were named to the AP All-SEC Second Team; Trey DePriest, Ryan Kelly, Jarran Reed and A'Shawn Robinson were named to the AP All-SEC Honorable Mention Team. Kouandjio, Cooper, DePriest, Collins and Scott were named to the Coaches' All-SEC First Team. Sims and T. J. Yeldon were named to the Coaches' All-SEC Second Team.

==== National ====
After the season, a number of Alabama players both won and were named as national award winners and finalists. Finalists for major awards from the Crimson Tide included: Amari Cooper won the Fred Biletnikoff Award, finished third in the voting for the Heisman Trophy and was a finalist for the Walter Camp Award; J. K. Scott was a finalist for the Ray Guy Award; and Landon Collins was a finalist for the Jim Thorpe Award and the Bronko Nagurski Trophy.

For their individual performances during the regular season, several players were named to various national All-American Teams. Amari Cooper and Landon Collins were named to the Walter Camp All-America First Team (WC). Cooper and Collins were named to the Associated Press All-American First Team; Arie Kouandjio and J. K. Scott were named to the Associated Press All-American Second Team. Cooper, Collins and Scott were named to the Sporting News (TSN) All-America Team. Cooper and Collins were named to the Football Writers Association of America (FWAA) All-America Team. Cooper, Collins, Trey DePriest and Kouandjio were named to the American Football Coaches Association (AFCA) All-America Team.

The NCAA recognizes five All-America lists in the determination of both consensus and unanimous All-America selections: the AP, AFCA, the FWAA, TSN and the WC. In order for an honoree to earn a consensus selection, he must be selected as first team in three of the five lists recognized by the NCAA, and unanimous selections must be selected as first team in all five lists. As such, for the 2014 season both Cooper and Collins were unanimous selections.
