= 2014 SEC Championship Game =

- Conference Championship
- 2014 SEC Championship logo
Alabama Crimson Tide	Missouri Tigers
(11–1)	(10–2)
42	13
Head coach: Nick Saban	Head coach: Gary Pinkel
AP / Coaches / CFP; 1 / 1 / 1	AP / Coaches / CFP; 14 / 13 / 16
	1	2	3	4	Total
Alabama	7	14	0	21	42
Missouri	0	3	10	0	13
- Date: December 6, 2014
- Season: 2014
- Stadium: Georgia Dome
- Location: Atlanta, Georgia
- MVP: QB Blake Sims, Alabama
- Favorite: Alabama by 14.5
- Referee: Tom Ritter
- Attendance: 73,526

United States TV coverage
- Network: CBS
- Announcers: Verne Lundquist (play-by-play); Gary Danielson (color); Tracy Wolfson (sideline)

2014 Southeastern Conference football standings
	Conf.			Overall
Team	W		L	W		L
Eastern Division
No. 14 Missouri x	7	–	1	11	–	3
No. 9 Georgia	6	–	2	10	–	3
Florida	4	–	4	7	–	5
Tennessee	3	–	5	7	–	6
South Carolina	3	–	5	7	–	6
Kentucky	2	–	6	5	–	7
Vanderbilt	0	–	8	3	–	9
Western Division
No. 4 Alabama x$^	7	–	1	12	–	2
No. 11 Mississippi State	6	–	2	10	–	3
No. 17 Ole Miss *	5	–	3	9	–	4
No. 22 Auburn	4	–	4	8	–	5
LSU *	4	–	4	8	–	5
Texas A&M	3	–	5	8	–	5
Arkansas	2	–	6	7	–	6
Championship: Alabama 42, Missouri 13
^ – College Football Playoff participant; $ – Conference champion; x – Division champion/co-champions; * LSU and Ole Miss vacated all wins (except for Ole Miss' win over Presbyterian) due to NCAA violations.; Rankings from AP Poll

The 2014 SEC Championship Game was played on Saturday, December 6, 2014, in the Georgia Dome in Atlanta, and determined the 2014 football champion of the Southeastern Conference (SEC). The game was played between Western Division Champion Alabama and Eastern Division Champion Missouri. Missouri was the designated home team, and the game was televised by CBS for the fourteenth straight year. In the game, Alabama defeated Missouri 42–13 and captured their 24th SEC football championship.

== Notes ==
The winner of the SEC Championship Game had competed in the last 8 BCS National Championship games, posting a 6–2 record. This was the inaugural season of the College Football Playoff, replacing the Bowl Championship Series. The winner of the game, if not selected for the playoff, would normally have played in the Sugar Bowl. However, because that year's Sugar Bowl was to host a national semifinal playoff game, the team would be sent to either the Cotton Bowl, Orange Bowl, Peach Bowl, or the Fiesta Bowl. Since the winner, Alabama, ended up as the #1 playoff seed, they ended up playing in the Sugar Bowl anyway.

== Teams ==
=== Alabama ===
The Tide began their season with a 4–0 start before being upset by No. 11 Ole Miss on October 4. Since then, they won their last seven games, including knocking off No. 1 Mississippi State. Alabama closed out the regular season with a 55–44 win over No. 15 Auburn to avenge last year's loss, and finished 7–1 in conference play, 11–1 overall. The Crimson Tide are entering their 9th SEC Championship Game, having won in their last two appearances (and eventually the BCS National Championship Game), and have a 4–4 overall record in the game. Alabama was able to clinch the Western Division on November 29 prior to the Iron Bowl game kicking off, as Ole Miss defeated Mississippi State in the Egg Bowl to drop Mississippi State to 6–2 in SEC play.

=== Missouri ===
The Tigers got off to 4–2 start to open the year, suffering early home losses against Indiana and No. 13 Georgia. The Tigers then won six consecutive games to finish the regular season with a 7–1 conference record, and 10–2 overall record. The Tigers are making their second straight appearance in the SEC Championship Game; last year's team fell to eventual national runner-up Auburn 59–42. The Tigers were able to clinch the Eastern Division after defeating Arkansas on November 28.

== Game summary ==
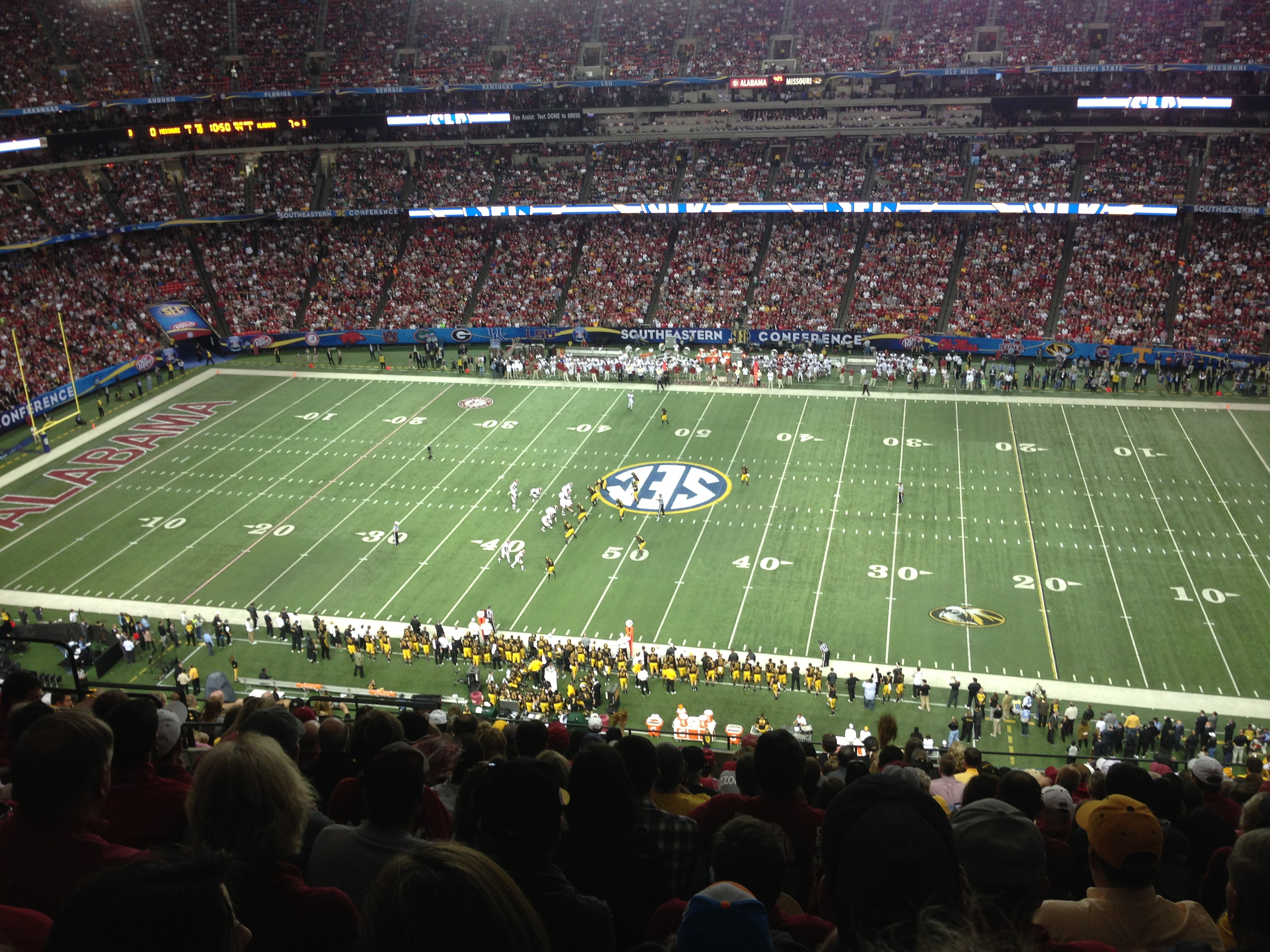

Alabama scored on the game's opening drive to take a quick 7–0 lead, and a long touchdown pass from quarterback Blake Sims to receiver DeAndrew White early in the second quarter extended the lead to 14–0. Missouri's offense pieced together a response, but the drive fizzled out and ended in a field goal. Another Bama touchdown late in the quarter gave the Crimson Tide a 21–3 halftime lead. Missouri fought their way back into the game in the third quarter, ripping off 10 points to cut the Alabama lead to 8. Unfortunately for the Tigers, they would fail to score for the remainder of the game, as Alabama scored three unanswered touchdowns to secure a 42–13 victory. The win gave Alabama its 24th SEC Championship, Sims set an SEC Championship Game record for completion percentage, and wide receiver Amari Cooper set both the SEC record for most receptions in a single season and the record for most receptions in the SEC Championship Game.

Scoring summary

Quarter	Time	Drive			Team	Scoring information	Score	
Quarter	Time	Plays	Yards	TOP	Team	Scoring information	Alabama	Missouri
1	11:24	10	68	3:36	Alabama	T. J. Yeldon 1-yard touchdown run, Adam Griffith kick good	7	0
2	11:48	1	58	0:10	Alabama	DeAndrew White 58-yard touchdown reception from Blake Sims, Adam Griffith kick good	14	0
2	8:30	9	58	3:18	Missouri	33-yard field goal by Andrew Baggett	14	3
2	2:47	14	75	5:43	Alabama	T. J. Yeldon 2-yard touchdown run, Adam Griffith kick good	21	3
3	11:00	10	75	4:00	Missouri	Bud Sasser 1-yard touchdown reception from Maty Mauk, Andrew Baggett kick good	21	10
3	4:37	9	46	3:43	Missouri	33-yard field goal by Andrew Baggett	21	13
4	14:55	10	64	4:42	Alabama	Christion Jones 6-yard touchdown reception from Blake Sims, Adam Griffith kick good	28	13
4	7:38	8	90	4:37	Alabama	Derrick Henry 26-yard touchdown run, Adam Griffith kick good	35	13
4	3:38	5	62	2:46	Alabama	Derrick Henry 1-yard touchdown run, Adam Griffith kick good	42	13
"TOP" = time of possession. For other American football terms, see Glossary of American football.							42	13

=== Statistics ===
Statistics	Alabama	Missouri
First downs	28	10
Total offense	504	313
Rushing yards–TD	242–4	41–0
Passing yards–TD	262–2	272–1
Passing: Comp–Att–Int	23–27–0	16–34–0
Fumbles: Number–Lost	3–0	2–1
Penalties: Number–Yards	2–10	6–60
Punts: Average Yardage	3–43.3	7–43.4
Kickoffs: Average Yardage	7–58.6	4–64.2
Sacks: Number–Yards	0–0	2–12
Field Goals: Good–Att	0–1	2–2
Points off turnovers	7	0
Time of Possession	36:43	23:17
