= Jabriel Washington =

American football player (born 1993)

Profile
- Position: Cornerback

Personal information
- Born: Jackson, Tennessee, U.S.
- Listed height: 5 ft 11 in (1.80 m)
- Listed weight: 183 lb (83 kg)

Career information
- High school: Jackson (TN) Trinity Christian
- College: Alabama
- NFL draft: 2016: undrafted

Career history

Playing
- Los Angeles Rams (2016)*
- * Offseason or practice squad member only

Coaching
- Washington University in St. Louis Graduate assistant

Awards and highlights
- CFP national champion (2016); BCS national champion (2012, 2013)

Jabriel Washington (born 1993) is an American former football cornerback. He played college football at Alabama.

== Personal life ==
A native of Jackson, Tennessee, he attended Trinity Christian Academy where he played both quarterback and free safety on the football team.

== College career ==
After redshirting his initial year at Alabama, Washington recorded two assisted tackles in 2012. In 2014, he made his first collegiate interception in a game against Florida.

== Professional career ==
Washington signed with the Los Angeles Rams after going undrafted in the 2016 NFL draft. On September 3, 2016, he was waived by the Rams as part of final roster cuts.
