= Bo Davis =

American football player and coach (born 1970)

New Orleans Saints
- Title: Defensive line coach

Personal information
- Born: May 17, 1970 (age 56); Magee, Mississippi, U.S.

Career information
- Position: Defensive tackle
- College: LSU (1990–1992)

Career history
- LSU (1995–1997) Graduate assistant; North Shore High School (1998–2001) Assistant coach; LSU (2002–2005) Assistant strength and conditioning coach; Miami Dolphins (2006) Assistant defensive line coach; Alabama (2007–2010) Defensive line coach; Texas (2011–2013) Defensive tackles coach; Alabama (2014–2015) Defensive line coach; Jacksonville Jaguars (2016) Intern; UTSA (2017) Defensive line coach; Detroit Lions (2018–2020) Defensive line coach; Texas (2021–2023) Defensive line coach; LSU (2024) Defensive line coach; New Orleans Saints (2025–present) Defensive line coach

Awards and highlights
- As a player: Second-team All-SEC (1992); As an assistant coach: 3× national champion (2003, 2009, 2015)

Bo Davis (born May 17, 1970) is an American football coach and former defensive lineman who currently serves as the defensive line coach for the New Orleans Saints of the National Football League (NFL).

== Coaching career ==
=== LSU (first and second stint) ===
Davis began his coaching career at his alma mater when he earned second team all SEC in 1995 as a graduate assistant. He left in 1997 to become an assistant North Shore High School in Texas. He returned to LSU in 2002 under Nick Saban as an assistant strength and conditioning coach. He won a national championship in 2003 and was retained by Les Miles for the 2005 season.

=== Miami Dolphins ===
Davis joined Saban's Miami Dolphins staff as an assistant defensive line coach for the 2006.

=== Alabama (first stint) ===
Following Saban once again, Davis joined the Crimson Tide as the team's defensive line coach in 2007. There he won another championship in 2009. However he would leave following the 2010 season.

=== Texas (first stint) ===
Davis then joined Mack Brown's Texas Longhorns where he coached the defensive tackles from 2011 to 2013.

=== Alabama (second stint) ===
Following his three years coaching at Texas, and one week as USC's defensive line coach, Davis returned to Alabama in 2014 to coach the defensive line replacing Chris Rumph. Additionally he won another national championship in 2015. He resigned after a recruiting controversy .

=== Jacksonville Jaguars ===
Davis returned to the NFL to coach as an intern for the Jacksonville Jaguars in 2016.

=== UTSA ===
For the 2017 season, Davis was in San Antonio coaching the Roadrunners defensive line.

=== Detroit Lions ===
Davis returned to the NFL once more to be the defensive line coach under Matt Patricia in Detroit. He stayed there until Patricia's firing during the 2020 season.

=== Texas (second stint) ===
Davis returned for a second stint with the Longhorns, this time under Steve Sarkisian working as their defensive line coach.

=== LSU (third stint) ===
Davis returned for a third stint with the Tigers in 2024 under Brian Kelly, working as the Tiger's defensive line coach.

=== New Orleans Saints ===
On February 27, 2025, the New Orleans Saints hired Davis to serve as their defensive line coach.
