= Land Clark =

American football official (born 1962)

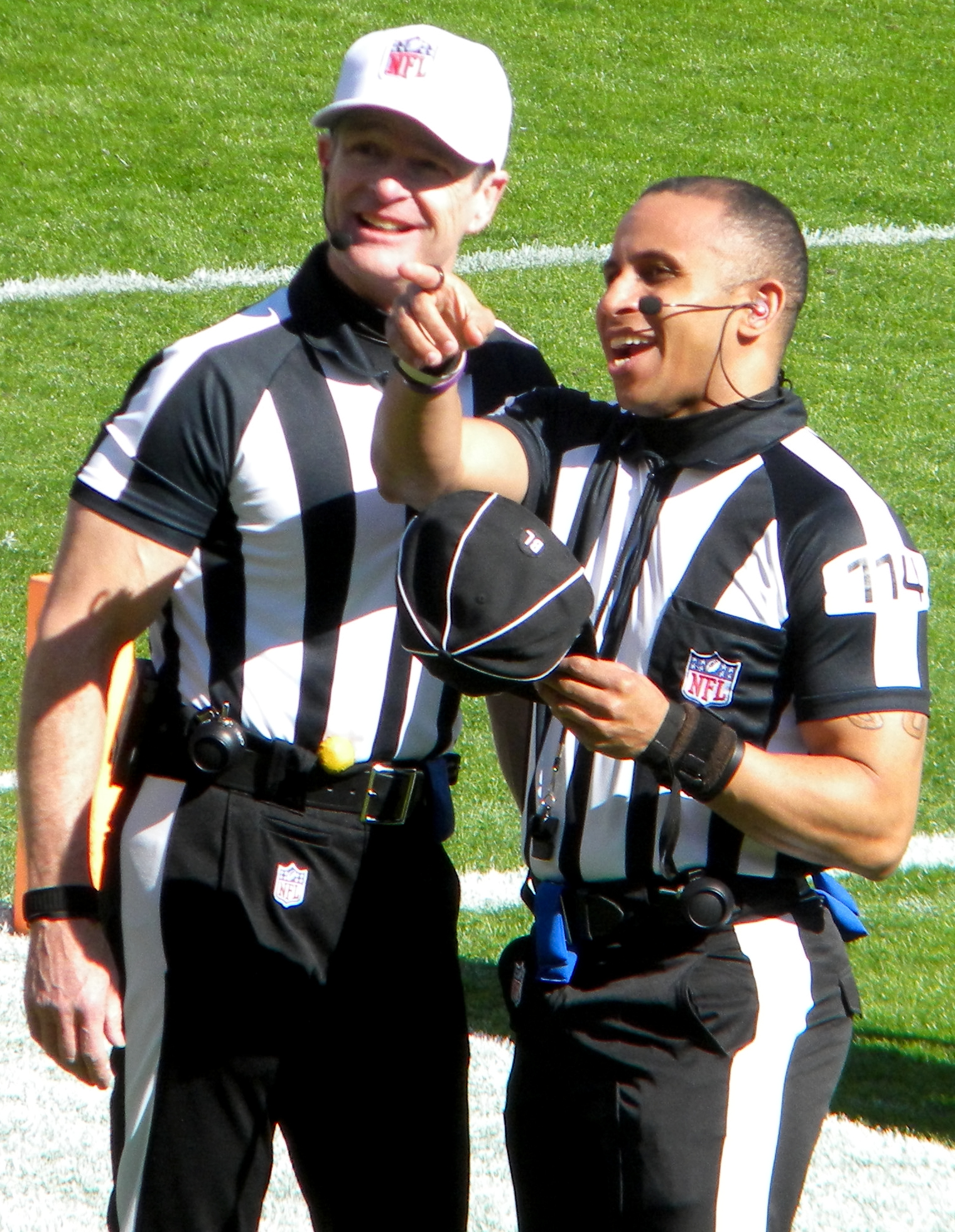
- NFL officials #130 Land Clark (left) with #114 Dominique Pender (right)
- Born: Vincent Land Clark; March 20, 1962 (age 64); Santa Barbara, California, U.S.
- Occupation: NFL official (2018–present)

Vincent Land Clark (born March 20, 1962) is an American professional football official in the National Football League (NFL) since the 2018 NFL season, wearing uniform number 130.

== Personal life ==
Clark graduated from South Sevier High School in Monroe, Utah in 1980. He resides in Albuquerque, New Mexico.

== Officiating career ==
=== Early years ===
Clark served several seasons in the NFL Officiating Development program. Prior to entering the NFL, Clark officiated in the Pac-12 Conference and worked as a referee and deep wing official. He was the referee for the 2013 BCS National Championship Game, as well as the 2015 Sugar Bowl, which served as the second semifinal game in the inaugural College Football Playoff.

=== NFL career ===
Clark was hired by the NFL in 2018 as a field judge, and was promoted to referee with the start of the 2020 NFL season following the retirement of Walt Anderson.

=== 2024 crew ===
- R: Land Clark
- U: Paul King
- DJ: Tom Stephan
- LJ: Jeff Hutcheon
- FJ: Jabir Walker
- SJ: Dominique Pender
- BJ: Brad Freeman
- RO: Bob Hubbell
- RA: Rick Loumiet
