= Trey DePriest =

American football player (born 1993)

No. 33
- Position: Linebacker

Personal information
- Born: June 9, 1993 (age 33); Springfield, Ohio, U.S.
- Listed height: 6 ft 0 in (1.83 m)
- Listed weight: 254 lb (115 kg)

Career information
- High school: Springfield (OH)
- College: Alabama
- NFL draft: 2015: undrafted

Career history
- Baltimore Ravens (2015)*
- * Offseason or practice squad member only

Awards and highlights
- BCS national champion (2012, 2013); First-team All-SEC (2014); Second-team All-SEC (2013)

Trey DePriest (born June 9, 1993) is an American former football linebacker. He played college football at Alabama. He was signed as an undrafted free agent by the Baltimore Ravens in 2015.

== Early life ==
A native of Springfield, Ohio, DePriest attended Springfield High School, where he played linebacker and handled the punting duties, averaging 37.7 yards. As a junior, he recorded 101 tackles in 2009 with seven sacks and 10 tackles for loss while recovering three fumbles, earning All-Area Defensive Player of the Year and All-State honors. In his senior season, he registered 117 tackles, 12 tackles for loss and nine sacks. Besides repeating as All-Area Defensive Player of the Year and All-State selection, he won the Ohio Division-I Defensive Player of the Year award and was named All-American by USA Today and SuperPrep.

Regarded as a four-star recruit by Rivals.com, DePriest was ranked as the No. 7 outside linebacker in his class. DePriest chose Alabama over Ohio State, Florida, LSU, Oklahoma and Notre Dame.

College recruiting
Name	Hometown	School	Height	Weight	40^{‡}	Commit date
Trey DePriest; OLB	Springfield, Ohio	Springfield HS	6 ft 2 in (1.88 m)	230 lb (100 kg)	4.6	Jul 30, 2010
Trey DePriest; OLB	Recruit ratings: Scout: Rivals:					
Overall recruit ranking: Scout: 1 (SLB) Rivals: 7 (OLB), 5 (OH)
‡ Refers to 40-yard dash; Note: In many cases, Scout, Rivals, 247Sports, On3, and ESPN may conflict in their listings of height, weight and 40 time.; In these cases, the average was taken. ESPN grades are on a 100-point scale.; Sources: "2011 Team Ranking". Rivals.com.

== College career ==
He left high school a semester early in 2011 to start classes and participate in spring football practice at Alabama. He played in all thirteen games as a true freshman in 2011, with half of his 25 tackles coming on the kickoff coverage team. He finished the 2012 regular season second on the team in tackles to C.J. Mosley. As a junior in 2013, DePriest started all 13 games. He returned his senior season and again started all 14 games.

College career statistics

Year	School	GP–GS	Tackles				Sacks	Pass defense				Fumbles		Blocked
Year	School	GP–GS	Solo	Ast	Total	Loss–Yards	No–Yards	Int–Yards	BU	PD	QBH	Rcv–Yards	FF	Kick
2011	Alabama	13–0	11	14	25	1.5–10	0.0–0	0–0	0	0	1	0–0	0	0
2012	Alabama	14–13	30	29	59	4.0–16	0.0–0	0–0	2	2	2	0–0	0	0
2013	Alabama	13–13	31	34	65	7.5–22	2.0–15	0–0	2	2	0	0–0	2	0
2014	Alabama	7–7	22	18	40	3.0–9	0.0–0	0–0	1	0	1	0–0	1	0

== Professional career ==
On May 8, 2015, DePriest was signed by the Baltimore Ravens as an undrafted free agent. On May 27, he was cut by the Ravens.
