= Trinity Christian Academy (Jackson, Tennessee) =

Private school in Tennessee, United States

Coordinates: 35.689°N 88.907°W

Location
- 10 Windy City Road; Tennessee, (Madison County), Tennessee 38305; United States

Information
- Established: 1986
- Faculty: 55.6 (FTE)
- Grades: PK–12
- Enrollment: 660 (2021–22)
- Student to teacher ratio: 9.9
- Website: https://www.tcalions.com/

Trinity Christian Academy is a private Christian school in Jackson, Tennessee, consisting of grades Pre-K through 12 with about 700 students.

The academy started in 1986 with approximately fifty students in grades K through 7.
