= Brian Vogler (American football) =

American football player (born 1992)

No. 84
- Position: Tight end

Personal information
- Born: March 7, 1992 (age 34); Morristown, New Jersey, U.S.
- Listed height: 6 ft 7 in (2.01 m)
- Listed weight: 263 lb (119 kg)

Career information
- High school: Columbus (GA) Brookstone
- College: Alabama
- NFL draft: 2015: undrafted

Career history

Playing
- Chicago Bears (2015)*; Indianapolis Colts (2015)*; Atlanta Falcons (2016–2017)*
- * Offseason or practice squad member only

Coaching
- Georgia (2017) Football operations

Awards and highlights
- 2× BCS national champion (2012, 2013)

Brian Vogler (born March 7, 1992) is an American former football tight end. He played college football at Alabama, and signed with the Chicago Bears as an undrafted free agent in 2015.

== High school and college career ==
Vogler played high school football at Brookstone School in Columbus, Georgia.

ESPNU rated Vogler as the 4th best tight end and 69th overall recruit following his high school football career. In his senior year, Vogler caught 15 passes for 351 yards and 6 touchdowns, while also recording 78 tackles and three sacks playing linebacker. He participated in the 2010 Under Armour All-America Game.

Vogler played second string tight end his first season for the Crimson Tide, recording just three receptions for 27 yards. Vogler was named starter heading into the 2012 season. After taking the starting job, Vogler had 14 receptions for a total of 98 yards with 2 touchdowns.

== Professional career ==
=== Chicago Bears ===
Vogler signed with the Chicago Bears as an undrafted free agent, following the 2015 NFL draft. After breaking his foot during practice, Vogler was waived by the Bears on August 5, 2015.

=== Indianapolis Colts ===
On December 31, 2015, Vogler signed to the Indianapolis Colts' practice squad.

=== Atlanta Falcons ===
On December 21, 2016, Vogler signed a contract with the Falcons. On April 30, 2017, he was waived by the Falcons.

== Personal life ==
Married to Brighton Barousse in 2020.
