= Blake Sims =

American gridiron football player (born 1991)

Mt. Bethel Christian Academy (GA)
- Title: Offensive coordinator & quarterbacks coach

Personal information
- Born: January 4, 1991 (age 35); Gainesville, Georgia, U.S.
- Listed height: 5 ft 11 in (1.80 m)
- Listed weight: 218 lb (99 kg)

Career information
- High school: Gainesville
- College: Alabama (2010–2014)
- NFL draft: 2015: undrafted

Career history

Playing
- Toronto Argonauts (2015)*; Saskatchewan Roughriders (2015); Wollongong Devils (2016); Atlanta Falcons (2016)*; Tampa Bay Buccaneers (2016–2017)*; Birmingham Iron (2019); Spokane Shock (2021); Frisco Fighters (2022)
- * Offseason or practice squad member only

Coaching
- Mt. Bethel Christian Academy (GA) (2023–2026) Offensive coordinator & quarterbacks coach; University of West Alabama (2026–present) Wide receivers coach

Awards and highlights
- 2× BCS national champion (2012, 2013); Second-team All-SEC (2014)
- Stats at Pro Football Reference
- Stats at CFL.ca (archive)

Blake Sims (born January 4, 1991) is an American high school football coach and former player. He is the offensive coordinator and quarterbacks coach for Mt. Bethel Christian Academy, a position he has held since 2023. He played college football at Alabama and was the Crimson Tide's starting quarterback in 2014.

== Early life ==
Sims attended Gainesville High School in Gainesville, Georgia, where he played football and ran track his junior and senior seasons. He attended and played for Cass High School his freshman and sophomore years, starting as a sophomore. At Gainesville, played quarterback for head coach Bruce Miller, leading Gainesville to a 14–1 record and a state runner-up finish. He threw for 2,785 yards as a junior in 2008 while rushing for 822 yards and 15 scores. As a senior, he threw for 2,288 yards with 28 touchdowns, and rushed for 863 yards and 13 touchdowns. He twice earned AAA All-State honors by The Atlanta Journal-Constitution and the Associated Press (AP) in 2009.

In track & field, Sims was one of the state's top sprinters. At the 2009 Gainesville Tri Meet vs Buford/Clarke Central, he won the long jump event, recording a jump of 6.58 meters. At the '2009 "Flowery Branch, West Hall, Johnson, Gainesville, Chestatee Meet", he earned first-place finishes in both the 100 meters (10.85 s) and 200 meters (21.84 s). He won the 100 meters at the 2010 Battle at The Branch Invitational, at 10.84. He had a personal-best time of 10.69 seconds in the 100 meters.

Regarded as a four-star recruit by Rivals.com, Sims was ranked as the No. 33 athlete in the nation. He was also rated eighth in the AJC's 2010 Top 50 prospects in Georgia, No. 43 player by SuperPrep. He chose Alabama over scholarship offers from Tennessee, Georgia, FSU and Michigan.

== College career ==
After spending 2010 to 2013 as a running back and backup quarterback, Sims started his first career game during the opener of his senior season in 2014 after beating Jake Coker for the job. On September 20, 2014, he threw for 445 yards against Florida, which at the time was the second most in school history behind Scott Hunter's 484 in 1969. On December 6, 2014, Sims broke the Alabama single season passing yards record, which was previously held by A. J. McCarron. In 14 starts, he passed for 3,487 yards, 28 touchdowns and 10 interceptions. He led the SEC in passing touchdowns. He lost in the Sugar Bowl game in the semifinals to Ohio State, which later won the National Championship.

=== College statistics ===
| Season | Team | Games | | | Passing | | | | | | | | Rushing | | | |
| Season | Team | GP | GS | Record | Comp | Att | Pct | Yards | Avg | TD | Int | Rate | Att | Yards | Avg | TD |
|---|---|---|---|---|---|---|---|---|---|---|---|---|---|---|---|---|
| 2010 | Alabama | Redshirt | | | | | | | | | | | | | | |
| 2011 | Alabama | 5 | 0 | — | 0 | 0 | 0.0 | 0 | 0.0 | 0 | 0 | 0.0 | 22 | 107 | 4.9 | 0 |
| 2012 | Alabama | 10 | 0 | — | 5 | 10 | 50.0 | 77 | 7.7 | 0 | 0 | 114.7 | 30 | 187 | 6.2 | 2 |
| 2013 | Alabama | 13 | 0 | — | 18 | 29 | 62.1 | 167 | 5.8 | 2 | 0 | 133.2 | 15 | 61 | 4.1 | 0 |
| 2014 | Alabama | 14 | 14 | 12–2 | 252 | 391 | 64.4 | 3,487 | 8.9 | 28 | 10 | 157.9 | 78 | 350 | 4.5 | 7 |
| Career | | 42 | 14 | 12–2 | 275 | 430 | 64.0 | 3,731 | 87 | 30 | 10 | 88.8 | 145 | 705 | 4.9 | 9 |

== Professional career ==
Pre-draft measurables
| Height | Weight | Arm length | Hand span | 40-yard dash | 10-yard split | 20-yard split | Three-cone drill | Vertical jump | Broad jump |
|---|---|---|---|---|---|---|---|---|---|
| 5 ft 11 1/2 in (1.82 m) | 218 lb (99 kg) | 31 1/2 in (0.80 m) | 9 in (0.23 m) | 4.57 s | 1.67 s | 2.70 s | 7.15 s | 30 1/2 in (0.77 m) | 9 ft 7 in (2.92 m) |
3-cone from Alabama Pro Day, all others from NFL Combine

Sims was not drafted in the 2015 NFL draft, thus becoming a free agent. He was offered an opportunity to try out with the Green Bay Packers and the Washington Redskins as a running back. He was not offered a contract by either team.

Sims was signed by the Toronto Argonauts of the Canadian Football League (CFL) on May 28, 2015 and released June 7, 2015.

Sims was signed by the Saskatchewan Roughriders of the CFL on July 29, 2015. He was cut September 15, 2015, having been on the active roster for one game. Roughriders traded quarterback Kevin Glenn to the Montreal Alouettes October 14, 2015, and Sims was re-signed to replace Glenn. He did not appear in any games for the Roughriders and was released on December 15, 2015.

In July 2016, Sims left North America for Australia to continue his professional football career with the Wollongong Devils of the National Gridiron League.

On September 13, 2016, Sims was signed to the Atlanta Falcons' practice squad. He was released on September 23.

On December 28, 2016, Sims was signed to the Tampa Bay Buccaneers' practice squad. He signed a reserve/future contract with the Buccaneers on January 2, 2017. He was waived on August 28, 2017.

After his release by the Buccaneers, Sims was assigned to the Birmingham Iron of the Alliance of American Football. In the league's quarterback draft on November 27, he was retained by the Iron with their second-round selection. He was placed on injured reserve on February 27, 2019, and waived from injured reserve on April 1, 2019.

On February 27, 2022, Sims signed with the Frisco Fighters of the Indoor Football League. On August 25, 2022, Sims retired from professional football.

== Coaching career ==
On March 17, 2023, Sims announced he became the offensive coordinator and quarterbacks coach for Mt. Bethel Christian Academy.
