= 2025 Purdue Boilermakers football team =

American college football season

2025 Purdue Boilermakers football
- Conference: Big Ten Conference
- Record: 2–10 (0–9 Big Ten)
- Head coach: Barry Odom (1st season)
- Offensive coordinator: Josh Henson (1st season)
- Offensive scheme: Multiple
- Defensive coordinator: Michael Scherer (1st season)
- Base defense: Multiple 3–3–5
- Home stadium: Ross–Ade Stadium

2025 Big Ten Conference football standings
	Conf.			Overall
Team	W		L	W		L
No. 1 Indiana y$#^	9	–	0	16	–	0
No. 5 Ohio State y^	9	–	0	12	–	2
No. 4 Oregon ^	8	–	1	13	–	2
No. 21 Michigan	7	–	2	9	–	4
No. 20 USC	7	–	2	9	–	4
No. 17 Iowa	6	–	3	9	–	4
Illinois	5	–	4	9	–	4
Washington	5	–	4	9	–	4
Minnesota	5	–	4	8	–	5
Nebraska	4	–	5	7	–	6
Northwestern	4	–	5	7	–	6
Penn State	3	–	6	7	–	6
UCLA	3	–	6	3	–	9
Rutgers	2	–	7	5	–	7
Wisconsin	2	–	7	4	–	8
Maryland	1	–	8	4	–	8
Michigan State	1	–	8	4	–	8
Purdue	0	–	9	2	–	10
Championship: Indiana 13, Ohio State 10
# – College Football Playoff champion; ^ – College Football Playoff participant; $ – Conference champion; y – Championship game participant; As of October 16, 2026; Rankings from AP Poll

The 2025 Purdue Boilermakers football team was an American football team that represented Purdue University as a member of the Big Ten Conference during the 2025 NCAA Division I FBS football season. Led by first-year head coach Barry Odom, the Boilermakers played their home games at Ross–Ade Stadium in West Lafayette, Indiana. For the second straight year, the Boilermakers failed to win a single conference game.

== Schedule ==
Date	Time	Opponent	Site	TV	Result	Attendance
August 30	12:00 p.m.	Ball State*	Ross–Ade Stadium; West Lafayette, IN	BTN	W 31–0	53,994
September 6	7:30 p.m.	No. 14 (FCS) Southern Illinois*	Ross–Ade Stadium; West Lafayette, IN	BTN	W 34–17	54,663
September 13	3:30 p.m.	USC	Ross–Ade Stadium; West Lafayette, IN	CBS	L 17–33	58,065
September 20	3:30 p.m.	at No. 24 Notre Dame*	Notre Dame Stadium; Notre Dame, IN (rivalry)	NBC/Peacock (Note: Game was moved to Peacock due to overrun into Big Ten Saturday Night after it was delayed due to lightning in the area.)	L 30–56	77,622
October 4	12:00 p.m.	No. 22 Illinois	Ross–Ade Stadium; West Lafayette, IN (rivalry)	BTN	L 27–43	56,551
October 11	7:30 p.m.	at Minnesota	Huntington Bank Stadium; Minneapolis, MN	BTN	L 20–27	49,254
October 18	3:00 p.m.	at Northwestern	Martin Stadium; Evanston, IL	BTN	L 0–19	12,023
October 25	12:00 p.m.	Rutgers^{†}	Ross–Ade Stadium; West Lafayette, IN	BTN	L 24–27	55,289
November 1	7:00 p.m.	at No. 21 Michigan	Michigan Stadium; Ann Arbor, MI	BTN	L 16–21	110,517
November 8	1:00 p.m.	No. 1 Ohio State	Ross–Ade Stadium; West Lafayette, IN	BTN	L 10–34	57,701
November 15	7:00 p.m.	at Washington	Husky Stadium; Seattle, WA	FS1	L 13–49	67,229
November 28	7:30 p.m.	No. 2 Indiana	Ross–Ade Stadium; West Lafayette, IN (Old Oaken Bucket)	NBC	L 3–56	59,807
*Non-conference game; ^{†}Homecoming; Rankings from AP Poll (and CFP Rankings, after November 4) - Released prior to game; All times are in Eastern time; Source:

== Game summaries ==
=== vs Ball State ===
Ball State Cardinals (0–0) at Purdue Boilermakers (0–0) – Game summary

Quarter	1	2	3	4	Total
Cardinals	0	0	0	0	0
Boilermakers	14	7	7	3	31

at Ross–Ade Stadium • West Lafayette, Indiana

- Date: August 30
- Game time: 12:00 p.m.
- Game weather: Sunny, 68 degrees
- Game attendance: 53,994
- Referee: Jeff Servinski
- TV announcers (BTN): Jason Ross Jr., Anthony Herron, and Dannie Rogers

Game information

First quarter

- PUR – Arhmad Branch 49-yard pass from Ryan Browne (Spencer Porath kick), 14:20. Boilermakers 7–0. Drive: 2 plays, 72 yards, 0:36.
- PUR – Ryan Browne 5-yard run (Spencer Porath kick), 9:47. Boilermakers 14–0. Drive: 6 plays, 71 yards, 2:55.

Second quarter

- PUR – Devin Mockobee 4-yard run (Spencer Porath kick), 10:21. Boilermakers 21–0. Drive: 13 plays, 91 yards, 5:26.

Third quarter

- PUR – Michael Jackson III 14-yard pass from Ryan Browne (Spencer Porath kick), 4:40. Boilermakers 28–0. Drive: 7 plays, 73 yards, 2:38.

Fourth quarter

- PUR – Spencer Porath 28-yard field goal, 9:59. Boilermakers 31–0. Drive: 13 plays, 61 yards, 5:01.

Statistics	BALL	PUR
First downs	13	23
Plays–yards	52–203	59–433
Rushes–yards	36–116	30–93
Passing yards	87	340
Passing: comp–att–int	10–16–0	20–29–0
Turnovers	0	0
Time of possession	33:40	26:20

Team	Category	Player	Statistics
Ball State	Passing	Kiael Kelly	10/16, 87 yards
Ball State	Rushing	Kiael Kelly	22 carries, 63 yards
Ball State	Receiving	Elijah Jackson	1 reception, 37 yards
Purdue	Passing	Ryan Browne	18/26, 311 yards, 2 TD
Purdue	Rushing	Devin Mockobee	14 carries, 59 yds, TD
Purdue	Receiving	Arhmad Branch	3 receptions, 101 yards, TD

=== vs No. 14 (FCS) Southern Illinois ===
No. 14 (FCS) Southern Illinois Salukis (1–0) at Purdue Boilermakers (1–0) – Game summary

Quarter	1	2	3	4	Total
No. 14 (FCS) Salukis	14	0	0	3	17
Boilermakers	14	10	3	7	34

at Ross–Ade Stadium • West Lafayette, Indiana

- Date: September 6
- Game time: 7:30 p.m.
- Game weather: Sunny, 65 degrees
- Game attendance: 54,663
- Referee: Francisco Villar
- TV announcers (BTN): Mark Followill, Anthony Herron, and Dannie Rogers

Game information

First quarter

- SIU – DJ Williams 7-yard run (Paul Geelen kick), 10:29. Salukis 7–0. Drive: 10 plays, 75 yards, 4:31.
- PUR – Arhmad Branch 13-yard pass from Ryan Browne (Spencer Porath kick), 6:34. Tied 7–7. Drive: 9 plays, 72 yards, 3:49.
- SIU – Ryan Schwendeman 4-yard pass from DJ Williams (Paul Geelen kick), 5:08. Salukis 14–7. Drive: 3 plays, 75 yards, 1:26.
- PUR – Nitro Tuggle 29-yard pass from Ryan Browne (Spencer Porath kick), 1:33. Tied 14–14. Drive: 8 plays, 76 yards, 3:31.

Second quarter

- PUR – Spencer Porath 25-yard field goal, 10:41. Boilermakers 17–14. Drive: 9 plays, 52 yards, 4:15.
- PUR – Devin Mockobee 1-yard run (Spencer Porath kick), 1:21. Boilermakers 24–14. Drive: 12 plays, 55 yards, 5:00.

Third quarter

- PUR – Spencer Porath 43-yard field goal, 6:15. Boilermakers 27–14. Drive: 10 plays, 23 yards, 4:57.

Fourth quarter

- PUR – Devin Mockobee 1-yard run (Spencer Porath kick), 11:48. Boilermakers 34–14. Drive: 13 plays, 70 yards, 7:10.
- SIU – Paul Geelen 53-yard field goal, 7:41. Boilermakers 34–17. Drive: 10 plays, 40 yards, 4:07.

Statistics	SIU	PUR
First downs	20	29
Total yards	283	384
Rushes–yards	26–81	53–214
Passing yards	202	170
Passing: comp–att–int	20–34–0	14–23–1
Turnovers	0	1
Time of possession	23:14	36:46

Team	Category	Player	Statistics
Southern Illinois	Passing	DJ Williams	20/33, 202 yards, TD
Southern Illinois	Rushing	Vinson Davis III	2 carries, 22 yards
Southern Illinois	Receiving	Fabian McCray	2 receptions, 72 yards
Purdue	Passing	Ryan Browne	14/23, 170 yards, 2 TD, INT
Purdue	Rushing	Devin Mockobee	32 carries, 126 yards, 2 TD
Purdue	Receiving	George Burhenn	3 receptions, 48 yards

=== vs USC ===
USC Trojans (2–0) at Purdue Boilermakers (2–0) – Game summary

Quarter	1	2	3	4	Total
Trojans	3	14	13	3	33
Boilermakers	0	3	7	7	17

at Ross–Ade Stadium • West Lafayette, Indiana

- Date: September 13
- Game time: 3:30 p.m. (Note: The game was initially scheduled for 3:30 p.m. EST, but was postponed until 6:45 p.m. EST due to thunderstorms.)
- Game weather: Sunny • Temperature: 72 °F (22 °C) • Wind: S at 9 miles per hour (14 km/h)
- Game attendance: 56,065
- Referee: Tim O'Day
- TV announcers (CBS): Brad Nessler, Gary Danielson, and Jenny Dell

Game information

First quarter

- (7:39) USC – Ryon Sayeri 24-yard field goal (Drive: 8 plays, 84 yards, 4:00; USC 3–0)

Second quarter

- (14:54) USC – Jayden Maiava 3-yard run, Ryon Sayeri kick (Drive: 10 plays, 80 yards, 4:02; USC 10–0)
- (10:49) PUR – Spencer Porath 39-yard field goal (Drive: 10 plays, 56 yards, 4:01; USC 10–3)
- (3:18) USC – Waymond Jordan 6-yard run, Ryon Sayeri kick (Drive: 13 plays, 75 yards, 7:31; USC 17–3)

Third quarter

- (12:15) USC – Ryon Sayeri 37-yard field goal (Drive: 8 plays, 65 yards, 2:40; USC 20–3)
- (8:47) PUR – Ryan Browne 8-yard fumble recovery, Spencer Porath kick (Drive: 8 plays, 67 yards, 3:22; USC 20–10)
- (5:01) USC – Ryon Sayeri 48-yard field goal (Drive: 9 plays, 44 yards, 3:46; USC 23–10)
- (2:15) USC – Jamall Jarrett 70-yard interception return, Ryon Sayeri kick (Drive: 7 plays, 55 yards, 2:46; USC 30–10)

Fourth quarter

- (14:17) PUR – Nitro Tuggle 9-yard pass from Ryan Browne, Spencer Porath kick (Drive: 8 plays, 63 yards, 2:51; USC 30–17)
- (1:10) USC – Ryon Sayeri 19-yard field goal (Drive: 8 plays, 63 yards, 4:27; USC 33–17)

Statistics	USC	PUR
First downs	22	23
Plays–yards	68–460	67–365
Rushes–yards	40–178	28–60
Passing yards	282	305
Passing: comp–att–int	17–28–0	24–39–1
Turnovers	0	3
Time of possession	34:07	25:53

Team	Category	Player	Statistics
USC	Passing	Jayden Maiava	17/28, 282 yards
USC	Rushing	Waymond Jordan	18 carries, 77 yards, TD
USC	Receiving	Ja'Kobi Lane	3 receptions, 115 yards
Purdue	Passing	Ryan Browne	24/39, 305 yards, TD, 3 INT
Purdue	Rushing	Devin Mockobee	12 carries, 45 yards
Purdue	Receiving	EJ Horton Jr.	5 receptions, 70 yards

=== at No. 24 Notre Dame (rivalry) ===
Purdue Boilermakers (2–1) at No. 24 Notre Dame Fighting Irish (0–2) – Game summary

Quarter	1	2	3	4	Total
Boilermakers	7	16	0	7	30
No. 24 Fighting Irish	14	21	21	0	56

at Notre Dame Stadium • Notre Dame, Indiana

- Date: September 20
- Game time: 3:30 p.m.
- Game weather: Cloudy, 83 °F (28 °C), Wind S @ 6 mph (10 km/h)
- Game attendance: 77,622
- Referee: Mark Kluczynski
- TV announcers (NBC/Peacock): Dan Hicks, Jason Garrett, and Zora Stephenson

Game information

First quarter

- (13:40) ND – Malachi Fields 66-yard pass from CJ Carr, Erik Schmidt kick (Drive: 1 play, 66 yards, 0:09; Notre Dame 7–0)
- (10:58) PUR – Ryan Browne 14-yard pass from Devin Mockobee, Spencer Porath kick (Drive: 6 plays, 75 yards, 2:42; Tied 7–7)
- (5:54) ND – Jeremiyah Love 1-yard run, Erik Schmidt kick (Drive: 10 plays, 56 yards, 4:57; Notre Dame 14–7)

Second quarter

- (14:50) PUR – Spencer Porath 48-yard field goal (Drive: 13 plays, 45 yards, 6:04; Notre Dame 14–10)
- (10:00) ND – Jadarian Price 21-yard run, Erik Schmidt kick (Drive: 9 plays, 75 yards, 4:50; Notre Dame 21–10)
- (6:33) ND – Jadarian Price 9-yard run, Erik Schmidt kick (Drive: 5 plays, 36 yards, 2:16; Notre Dame 28–10)
- (1:46) PUR – Spencer Porath 26-yard field goal (Drive: 12 plays, 67 yards, 4:47; Notre Dame 28–13)
- (1:13) PUR – Spencer Porath 35-yard field goal (Drive: 4 plays, 1 yard, 0:27; Notre Dame 28–16)
- (1:00) ND – Jadarian Price 100-yard kickoff return, Erik Schmidt kick (Drive: 0:00; Notre Dame 35–16)
- (0:07) PUR – Nitro Tuggle 24-yard pass from Ryan Browne, Spencer Porath kick (Drive: 6 plays, 75 yards, 0:53; Notre Dame 35–23)

Third quarter

- (12:54) ND – Jeremiyah Love 46-yard run, Erik Schmidt kick (Drive: 5 plays, 75 yards, 2:06; Notre Dame 42–23)
- (9:52) ND – Jordan Faison 48-yard pass from CJ Carr, Erik Schmidt kick (Drive: 3 plays, 67 yards, 1:11; Notre Dame 49–23)
- (3:46) ND – Jadarian Price 1-yard run, Erik Schmidt kick (Drive: 8 plays, 70 yards, 5:01; Notre Dame 56–23)

Fourth quarter

- (1:53) PUR – Jesse Watson 24-yard pass from Malachi Singleton, Spencer Porath kick (Drive: 5 plays, 58 yards, 2:05; Notre Dame 56–30)

Statistics	PUR	ND
First downs	20	27
Plays–yards	68–369	63–535
Rushes–yards	28–66	43–254
Passing yards	303	281
Passing: comp–att–int	25–40–2	17–20–0
Turnovers	2	1
Time of possession	28:00	32:00

Team	Category	Player	Statistics
Purdue	Passing	Ryan Browne	21/34, 250 yards, TD, INT
Purdue	Rushing	Malachi Singleton	5 carries, 26 yards
Purdue	Receiving	Nitro Tuggle	3 receptions, 66 yards, TD
Notre Dame	Passing	CJ Carr	10/12, 223 yards, 2 TD
Notre Dame	Rushing	Jeremiyah Love	19 carries, 157 yards, 2 TD
Notre Dame	Receiving	Jordan Faison	5 receptions, 105 yards, TD

=== vs No. 22 Illinois (rivalry) ===
No. 22 Illinois Fighting Illini (4–1) at Purdue Boilermakers (2–2) – Game summary

Quarter	1	2	3	4	Total
No. 22 Fighting Illini	0	27	13	3	43
Boilermakers	7	7	7	6	27

at Ross–Ade Stadium • West Lafayette, Indiana

- Date: October 4
- Game time: 12:00 p.m.
- Game weather: Sunny, 81 degrees
- Game attendance: 56,551
- Referee: Jason Nickleby
- TV announcers (BTN): Mark Followill, Yogi Roth, and Rhett Lewis

Game information

First quarter

- (7:27) PUR – Ryan Browne 1-yard run, Spencer Porath kick (Drive: 10 plays, 62 yards, 4:05; Purdue 7-0)

Second quarter

- (14:56) ILL – David Olano 35-yard field goal (Drive: 14 plays, 58 yards, 7:31; Purdue 7-3)
- (12:50) ILL – Hank Beatty 62-yard pass from Luke Altmyer, David Olano kick (Drive: 1 play, 62 yards, 0:23; Illinois 10-7)
- (3:52) ILL – Kaden Feagin 6-yard run, David Olano kick (Drive: 8 plays, 94 yards, 5:03; Illinois 17-7)
- (2:25) ILL – Ca'Lil Valentine 25-yard run, David Olano kick (Drive: 2 plays, 80 yards, 0:38; Illinois 24-7)
- (1:13) PUR – Corey Smith 60-yard pass from Ryan Browne, Spencer Porath kick (Drive: 5 plays, 75 yards, 1:12; Illinois 24-14)
- (0:00) ILL – David Olano 42-yard field goal (Drive: 5 plays, 51 yards, 1:13; Illinois 27-14)

Third quarter

- (11:44) ILL – David Olano 45-yard field goal (Drive: 6 plays, 38 yards, 3:16; Illinois 30-14)
- (9:01) PUR – Antonio Harris 41-yard run, Spencer Porath kick (Drive: 6 plays, 81 yards, 2:39; Illinois 30-21)
- (5:16) ILL – David Olano 34-yard field goal (Drive: 4 plays, -7 yards, 1:56; Illinois 33-21)
- (1:19) ILL – Kaden Feagin 1-yard run, David Olano kick (Drive: 5 plays, 68 yards, 2:56; Illinois 40-21)

Fourth quarter

- (12:34) PUR – Devin Mockobee 1-yard run, two-point pass conversion failed (Drive: 13 plays, 75 yards, 3:45; Illinois 40-27)
- (1:06) ILL – David Olano 40-yard field goal (Drive: 4 plays, 3 yards, 1:31; Illinois 43-27)

Statistics	ILL	PUR
First downs	22	25
Plays–yards	63–507	75–453
Rushes–yards	41–117	25–151
Passing yards	390	302
Passing: comp–att–int	19–22–0	30–50–2
Turnovers	0	2
Time of possession	34:32	25:28

Team	Category	Player	Statistics
Illinois	Passing	Luke Altmyer	19/22, 390 yards, TD
Illinois	Rushing	Ca'Lil Valentine	22 carries, 95 yards, TD
Illinois	Receiving	Hank Beatty	5 receptions, 186 yards, TD
Purdue	Passing	Ryan Browne	30/50, 302 yards, TD
Purdue	Rushing	Antonio Harris	4 carries, 69 yards, TD
Purdue	Receiving	Michael Jackson III	14 receptions, 94 yards

=== at Minnesota ===
Purdue Boilermakers (2–3) at Minnesota Golden Gophers (3–2) – Game summary

Quarter	1	2	3	4	Total
Boilermakers	7	10	3	0	20
Golden Gophers	0	13	0	14	27

at Huntington Bank Stadium • Minneapolis, Minnesota

- Date: October 11
- Game time: 7:30 p.m.
- Game weather: Sunny, 64 degrees
- Game attendance: 49,254
- Referee: Ron Snodgrass
- TV announcers (BTN): Chris Vosters, Anthony Herron and Dannie Rogers

Game information

First quarter

- (12:12) PUR – Malachi Singleton 40-yard run, Spencer Porath kick (Drive: 7 plays, 75 yards, 2:48; Purdue 7-0)

Second quarter

- (11:09) PUR – Spencer Porath 33-yard field goal (Drive: 8 plays, 33 yards, 2:39; Purdue 10-0)
- (9:46) MINN – Le'Meke Brockington 24-yard pass from Drake Lindsey, Brady Denaburg kick (Drive: 3 plays, 75 yards, 1:23; Purdue 10-7)
- (8:44) MINN – Brady Denaburg 46-yard field goal (Drive: 4 plays, 1 yards, 0:55; Purdue 10-10)
- (1:52) PUR – Ryan Browne 12-yard run, Spencer Porath kick (Drive: 13 plays, 75 yards, 6:52; Purdue 17-10)
- (0:00) MINN – Brady Denaburg 29-yard field goal (Drive: 12 plays, 75 yards, 1:23; Purdue 17-13)

Third quarter

- (8:20) PUR – Spencer Porath 20-yard field goal (Drive: 13 plays, 64 yards, 1:52; Purdue 20-13)

Fourth quarter

- (7:47) MINN – Jameson Geers 4-yard pass from Drake Lindsey, Brady Denaburg kick (Drive: 14 plays, 70 yards, 6:29; 20-20)
- (7:40) MINN – Koi Perich 27-yard interception return, Brady Denaburg kick (Drive: 1 play, 0 yards, 0:07; Minnesota 27-20)

Statistics	PUR	MINN
First downs	25	17
Plays–yards	82–456	63–262
Rushes–yards	40–253	18–30
Passing yards	203	232
Passing: comp–att–int	21–42–3	21–45–1
Turnovers	4	1
Time of possession	34:30	25:30

Team	Category	Player	Statistics
Purdue	Passing	Ryan Browne	21/40, 203 yards, 2 INT
Purdue	Rushing	Devin Mockobee	21 carries, 98 yards
Purdue	Receiving	Nitro Tuggle	3 receptions, 58 yards
Minnesota	Passing	Drake Lindsey	21/45, 232 yards, 2 TD, INT
Minnesota	Rushing	Darius Taylor	14 carries, 32 yards
Minnesota	Receiving	Darius Taylor	6 receptions, 67 yards

=== at Northwestern ===
Purdue Boilermakers (2–4) at Northwestern Wildcats (4–2) – Game summary

Quarter	1	2	3	4	Total
Boilermakers	0	0	0	0	0
Wildcats	3	10	6	0	19

at Martin Stadium • Evanston, Illinois

- Date: October 18
- Game time: 2:00 p.m. EDT
- Game weather: Cloudy, 69 degrees
- Game attendance: 12,023
- Referee: Kole Knueppel
- TV announcers (BTN): Guy Haberman, Yogi Roth and Rhett Lewis

Game information

First quarter

- (0:03) NU – Jack Olsen 27-yard field goal (Drive: 14 plays, 66 yards, 7:15; Northwestern 3-0)

Second quarter

- (13:13) NU – Hunter Welcing 3-yard pass from Preston Stone, Jack Olsen kick (Drive: 14 plays, 74 yards, 8:10; Northwestern 10-0)
- (8:38) NU – Jack Olsen 38-yard field goal (Drive: 7 plays, 60 yards, 2:04; Northwestern 13-0)

Third quarter

- (4:01) NU – Griffin Wilde 12-yard pass from Preston Stone, two-point pass conversion failed (Drive: 12 plays, 76 yards, 7:34; Northwestern 19-0)

Fourth quarter

'No scoring plays

Statistics	PUR	NU
First downs	11	24
Plays–yards	56–305	76–364
Rushes–yards	26–87	50–232
Passing yards	218	132
Passing: comp–att–int	16-30-1	11–26–1
Turnovers	3	2
Time of possession	22:21	37:39

Team	Category	Player	Statistics
Purdue	Passing	Malachi Singleton	11/20, 187 yards, INT
Purdue	Rushing	Malachi Thomas	7 carries, 34 yards
Purdue	Receiving	Devin Mockobee	2 receptions, 52 yards
Northwestern	Passing	Preston Stone	11/26, 132 yards, 2 TD, INT
Northwestern	Rushing	Joseph Himon II	22 carries, 87 yards
Northwestern	Receiving	Griffin Wilde	4 receptions, 47 yards, TD

=== vs Rutgers ===
Rutgers Scarlet Knights (3–4) at Purdue Boilermakers (2–5) – Game summary

Quarter	1	2	3	4	Total
Scarlet Knights	0	7	7	13	27
Boilermakers	10	0	7	7	24

at Ross–Ade Stadium • West Lafayette, Indiana

- Date: October 25
- Game time: 12:00 p.m.
- Game weather: Cloudy • Temperature: 49 °F (9 °C) • Wind: NE at 5 miles per hour (8.0 km/h)
- Game attendance: 55,289
- Referee: Chris Coyte
- TV announcers (BTN): Guy Haberman, Yogi Roth, and Rhett Lewis

Game information

First quarter

- (10:24) PUR – Malachi Thomas 8-yard pass from Malachi Singleton, Spencer Porath kick (Drive: 7 plays, 77 yards, 3:03; Purdue 7-0)
- (0:08) PUR – Spencer Porath 20-yard field goal (Drive: 11 plays, 92 yards, 5:33; Purdue 10-0)

Second quarter

- (0:12) RUTG – Antwan Raymond 1-yard run, Jai Patel kick (Drive: 17 plays, 85 yards, 5:32; Purdue 10-7)

Third quarter

- (13:10) PUR – Devin Mockobee 3-yard pass from Malachi Singleton, Spencer Porath kick (Drive: 4 plays, 75 yards, 1:50; Purdue 17-7)
- (7:33) RUTG – KJ Duff 72-yard pass from Athan Kaliakmanis, Jai Patel kick (Drive: 5 plays, 90 yards, 2:46; Purdue 17-14)

Fourth quarter

- (7:45) RUTG – Athan Kaliakmanis 1-yard run, Jai Patel kick (Drive: 7 plays, 90 yards, 4:32; Rutgers 21-17)
- (4:43) PUR – Nitro Tuggle 14-yard pass from Ryan Browne, Spencer Porath kick (Drive: 7 plays, 41 yards, 2:54; Purdue 24-21)
- (1:06) RUTG – Jai Patel 20-yard field goal (Drive: 11 plays, 73 yards, 3:37; 24-24)
- (0:00) RUTG – Jai Patel 30-yard field goal (Drive: 3 plays, 17 yards, 0:59; Rutgers 27-24)

Statistics	RUTG	PUR
First downs	22	14
Plays–yards	75–543	51–345
Rushes–yards	48–184	28–217
Passing yards	359	128
Passing: comp–att–int	19–27–0	13–23–0
Turnovers	1	1
Time of possession	36:58	23:02

Team	Category	Player	Statistics
Rutgers	Passing	Athan Kaliakmanis	19/27, 359 yards, TD
Rutgers	Rushing	Antwan Raymond	29 carries, 116 yards, TD
Rutgers	Receiving	KJ Duff	6 receptions, 241 yards, TD
Purdue	Passing	Ryan Browne	11/20, 117 yards, TD
Purdue	Rushing	Devin Mockobee	16 carries, 91 yards
Purdue	Receiving	Malachi Thomas	3 receptions, 50 yards, TD

=== at No. 21 Michigan ===
Purdue Boilermakers (2–6) at No. 21 Michigan Wolverines (6–2) – Game summary

Quarter	1	2	3	4	Total
Boilermakers	0	7	3	6	16
No. 21 Wolverines	7	7	0	7	21

at Michigan Stadium • Ann Arbor, Michigan

- Date: November 1
- Game time: 7:00 p.m.
- Game weather: 47 °F (8 °C), cloudy, NW 2 miles per hour (3.2 km/h)
- Game attendance: 110,517
- Referee: Brian Banks
- TV announcers (BTN): Jeff Levering, Jake Butt, and Brooke Fletcher

Game information

First quarter

- (1:25) MICH - Jordan Marshall 54-yard run (Dominic Zvada kick) (Drive: 2 plays, 79 yards, 0:18; MICH 7-0)

Second quarter

- (6:55) PUR - Antonio Harris 2-yard run (Spencer Porath kick) (Drive: 16 plays, 75 yards, 9:30; Tied 7-7)
- (0:17) MICH - Jordan Marshall 3-yard run (Dominic Zvada kick) (Drive: 5 plays, 32 yards, 0:41; MICH 14-7)

Third quarter

- (9:00) PUR - Spencer Porath 50-yard field goal (Drive: 10 plays, 35 yards, 4:20; MICH 14-10)

Fourth quarter

- (10:03) MICH - Jordan Marshall 9-yard run (Dominic Zvada kick) (Drive: 9 plays, 50 yards, 4:51; MICH 21-10)
- (6:00) PUR - Malachi Thomas 5-yard pass from Ryan Browne (pass failed) (Drive: 9 plays, 67 yards, 3:56; MICH 21-16)

Statistics	PUR	MICH
First downs	18	20
Plays–yards	65–276	61–398
Rushes–yards	39–198	39–253
Passing yards	138	145
Passing: comp–att–int	20–26–0	13–22–1
Turnovers	1	2
Time of possession	32:55	27:05

Team	Category	Player	Statistics
Purdue	Passing	Ryan Browne	19/24, 133 yards, TD
Purdue	Rushing	Malachi Thomas	15 carries, 68 yards
Purdue	Receiving	Michael Jackson III	6 receptions, 58 yards
Michigan	Passing	Bryce Underwood	13/22, 145 yards, INT
Michigan	Rushing	Jordan Marshall	25 carries, 185 yards, 3 TD
Michigan	Receiving	Zack Marshall	3 receptions, 58 yards

=== vs No. 1 Ohio State ===
No. 1 Ohio State Buckeyes (8–0) at Purdue Boilermakers (2–7) – Game summary

Quarter	1	2	3	4	Total
No. 1 Buckeyes	0	24	0	10	34
Boilermakers	3	0	0	0	3

at Ross–Ade Stadium • West Lafayette, Indiana

- Date: November 8
- Game time: 1:00 p.m.
- Game weather: Cloudy • Temperature: 52 °F (11 °C) • Wind: NW at 5 miles per hour (8.0 km/h)
- Game attendance: 57,701
- Referee: Jason Nickleby
- TV announcers (BTN): Jeff Levering, Jake Butt, and Brooke Fletcher

Game information

First quarter

- (4:23) PUR – Spencer Porath 40-yard field goal (Drive: 12 plays, 70 yards, 5:29; Purdue 3-0)

Second quarter

- (14:16) OSU – CJ Donaldson 1-yard run, Jayden Fielding kick (Drive: 9 plays, 75 yards, 5:07; Ohio State 7-3)
- (7:18) OSU – Jeremiah Smith 35-yard pass from Julian Sayin, Jayden Fielding kick (Drive: 10 plays, 89 yards, 5:44; Ohio State 14-3)
- (1:12) OSU – Lincoln Kienholz 3-yard run, Jayden Fielding kick (Drive: 9 plays, 30 yards, 5:21; Ohio State 21-3)
- (0:03) OSU – Jayden Fielding 49-yard field goal (Drive: 7 plays, 45 yards, 0:44; Ohio State 24-3)

Third quarter

No scoring plays

Fourth quarter

- (12:41) OSU – Jayden Fielding 45-yard field goal (Drive: 11 plays, 58 yards, 6:09; Ohio State 27-3)
- (6:19) OSU – CJ Donaldson 1-yard run, Jayden Fielding kick (Drive: 9 plays, 65 yards, 5:22; Ohio State 34-3)
- (1:45) PUR – Jesse Watson 7-yard pass from Malachi Singleton, Spencer Porath kick (Drive: 10 plays, 75 yards, 4:34; Ohio State 34-10)

Statistics	OSU	PUR
First downs	30	13
Plays–yards	76–473	44–186
Rushes–yards	43–170	22–92
Passing yards	303	94
Passing: comp–att–int	27–33–1	13–22–1
Turnovers	1	1
Time of possession	40:53	19:07

Team	Category	Player	Statistics
Ohio State	Passing	Julian Sayin	27/33, 303 yards, TD, INT
Ohio State	Rushing	Lamar Jackson	14 carries, 75 yards
Ohio State	Receiving	Jeremiah Smith	10 receptions, 137 yards, TD
Purdue	Passing	Ryan Browne	10/20, 76 yards, INT
Purdue	Rushing	Antonio Harris	13 carries, 45 yards
Purdue	Receiving	Rico Walker	1 reception, 30 yards

=== at Washington ===
Purdue Boilermakers (2–8) at Washington Huskies (6–3) – Game summary

Quarter	1	2	3	4	Total
Boilermakers	0	0	3	10	13
Huskies	7	21	14	7	49

at Husky Stadium • Seattle, Washington

- Date: November 15
- Game time: 7:00 p.m.
- Game weather: Rain • Temperature: 54 °F (12 °C) • Wind: S at 6 miles per hour (9.7 km/h)
- Game attendance: 67,229
- Referee: Gregory Blum
- TV announcers (FS1): Dan Hellie and Spencer Tillman

Game information

First quarter

- (3:30) WASH – Adam Mohammed 1-yard run, Grady Gross kick (Drive: 6 plays, 62 yards, 3:22; Washington 7-0)

Second quarter

- (9:07) WASH – Adam Mohammed 1-yard run, Grady Gross kick (Drive: 14 plays, 61 yards, 7:09; Washington 14-0)
- (7:05) WASH – Jordan Washington 68-yard run, Grady Gross kick (Drive: 1 play, 68 yards, 0:10; Washington 21-0)
- (0:05) WASH – Adam Mohammed 5-yard run, Grady Gross kick (Drive: 8 plays, 90 yards, 2:48; Washington 28-0)

Third quarter

- (11:59) WASH – Audric Harris 61-yard pass from Demond Williams Jr., Grady Gross kick (Drive: 4 plays, 87 yards, 1:58; Washington 35-0)
- (7:02) PUR – Spencer Porath 41-yard field goal (Drive: 11 plays, 52 yards, 4:57; Washington 35-3)
- (3:27) WASH – Dezmen Roebuck 2-yard pass from Demond Williams Jr., Grady Gross kick (Drive: 8 plays, 75 yards, 3:40; Washington 42-3)

Fourth quarter

- (12:15) PUR – Spencer Porath 53-yard field goal (Drive: 13 plays, 40 yards, 6:07; Washington 42-6)
- (7:15) PUR – EJ Horton Jr. 9-yard pass from Malachi Singleton, Spencer Porath kick (Drive: 7 plays, 68 yards, 3:32; Washington 42-13)
- (1:54) WASH – Kai Horton 2-yard run, Grady Gross kick (Drive: 8 plays, 75 yards, 5:17; Washington 49-13)

Statistics	PUR	WASH
First downs	14	24
Plays–yards	66-267	60-506
Rushes–yards	30-100	40-212
Passing yards	167	294
Passing: comp–att–int	17-34-1	18-22-0
Turnovers	1	1
Time of possession	28:52	31:08

Team	Category	Player	Statistics
Purdue	Passing	Malachi Singleton	16/28, 150 yards, TD
Purdue	Rushing	EJ Horton Jr.	1 carry, 31 yards
Purdue	Receiving	Nitro Tuggle	3 receptions, 57 yards
Washington	Passing	Demond Williams Jr.	16/19, 257 yards, 2 TD
Washington	Rushing	Jordan Washington	5 carries, 108 yards, TD
Washington	Receiving	Decker DeGraaf	5 receptions, 91 yards

=== vs No. 2 Indiana (Old Oaken Bucket) ===
No. 2 Indiana Hoosiers (11–0) at Purdue Boilermakers (2–9) – Game summary

Quarter	1	2	3	4	Total
No. 2 Hoosiers	7	21	21	7	56
Boilermakers	3	0	0	0	3

at Ross–Ade Stadium • West Lafayette, Indiana

- Date: November 28
- Game time: 7:30 p.m.
- Game weather: Clear • Temperature: 24 °F (−4 °C) • Wind: E at 0 miles per hour (0 km/h)
- Game attendance: 59,807
- Referee: Mark Kluczynski
- TV announcers (NBC): Paul Burmeister (play-by-play), Yogi Roth (analyst), and Zora Stephenson (sideline)

Game information

First quarter

- IU – Kaelon Black 1-yard run (Nicolas Radicic kick), 8:03. Hoosiers 7–0. Drive: 5 plays, 40 yards, 1:47.
- PUR – Spencer Porath 22-yard field goal, 00:46. Hoosiers 7–3. Drive: 11 plays, 67 yards, 5:42.

Second quarter

- IU – Fernando Mendoza 7-yard run (Nicolas Radicic kick), 10:29. Hoosiers 14–3. Drive: 11 plays, 65 yards, 5:17.
- IU – Kaelon Black 16-yard run (Nicolas Radicic kick), 3:40. Hoosiers 21–3. Drive: 2 plays, 36 yards, 00:45.
- IU – Roman Hemby 82-yard run (Nicolas Radicic kick), 1:33. Hoosiers 28–3. Drive: 2 plays, 82 yards, 00:18.

Third quarter

- IU – Elijah Sarratt 17-yard pass from Fernando Mendoza (Nicolas Radicic kick), 7:37. Hoosiers 35–3. Drive: 11 plays, 89 yards, 7:17.
- IU – Omar Cooper Jr. 43-yard pass from Fernando Mendoza (Nicolas Radicic kick), 3:52. Hoosiers 42–3. Drive: 2 plays, 42 yards, 00:47.
- IU – Khobie Martin 21-yard run (Nicolas Radicic kick), 0:00. Hoosiers 49–3. Drive: 2 plays, 79 yards, 00:46.

Fourth quarter

- IU – Davion Chandler 65-yard pass from Alberto Mendoza (Nicolas Radicic kick), 9:29. Hoosiers 56–3. Drive: 4 plays, 85 yards, 2:06.

Statistics	IU	PUR
First downs	22	16
Plays–yards	54–548	74–242
Rushes–yards	37–355	27–44
Passing yards	193	238
Passing: comp–att–int	10–17–0	25–47–1
Turnovers	0	2
Time of possession	26:52	33:08

Team	Category	Player	Statistics
Indiana	Passing	Fernando Mendoza	8/15, 117 yards, 2 TD
Indiana	Rushing	Roman Hemby	12 carries, 152 yards, 2 TD
Indiana	Receiving	Davion Chandler	1 reception, 65 yards, TD
Purdue	Passing	Ryan Browne	25/47, 238 yards, INT
Purdue	Rushing	Antonio Harris	15 carries, 31 yards
Purdue	Receiving	Nitro Tuggle	5 receptions, 80 yards

== Personnel ==
=== Roster ===
2025 Purdue Boilermakers football team roster
Players
Coaches
Offense

Pos.	#	Name	Class
WR	0	Nitro Tuggle	So
QB	1	Evans Chuba	Fr
WR	2	Michael Jackson III	Sr
QB	3	Malachi Singleton	So
WR	5	Chauncey Magwood (injured)	Sr
WR	6	Arhmad Branch	So
QB	7	Garyt Odom	Fr
WR	8	De'Nylon Morrissette (injured)	Jr
WR	9	Jalil Hall (injured)	Fr
WR	10	Jesse Watson	Fr
WR	11	Tra'Mar Harris	Fr
WR	12	Corey Smith	So
WR	13	E. J. Horton Jr.	Sr
QB	15	Ryan Browne	So
TE	17	Rico Walker	Jr
QB	18	Bennett Meredith	Jr
WR	19	David Washington	Fr
RB	20	Jaron Thomas	Fr
RB	22	Antonio Harris	So
RB	23	Jaheim Merriweather	So
RB	24	Malachi Thomas	Sr
RB	28	Addai Lewellen	Sr
RB	31	Carter Holsworth	Fr
WR	33	Quinn Rosenkranz	Fr
TE	41	Jon Grimmett	Fr
TE	43	Jackson Berryman	Fr
TE	44	Christian Moore	Sr
RB	45	Devin Mockobee (injured)	Sr
OL	50	John Randle Jr.	Fr
OL	51	Mason Vicari	So
OL	52	Rocco Daly	Fr
OL	54	Hayden Timosciek	Jr
OL	55	Braydn Joiner	So
OL	56	Tyrell Green	So
OL	57	Tom Ewing	So
OL	58	Hank Purvis	So
OL	62	Giordano Vaccaro	Sr
OL	53	Jimmy Johnsen	Fr
OL	67	Drew Woodruff	Jr
OL	68	Sankeerth Veluri	Fr
OL	70	Max Parrott	Fr
OL	71	Marques Easley	Fr
OL	72	Juke McCoskey	Jr
OL	74	Jalen St. John	Sr
OL	76	Ethan Trent	So
OL	77	Marc Nave Jr.	Fr
OL	78	Bakyne Coly	Sr
OL	79	Joey Tanona	Jr
WR	80	Roman Mercado	Fr
TE	81	George Burhenn (injured)	Jr
WR	83	Andrew Adkison	So
WR	84	Nolan Buckman	So
TE	85	Luke Puccinelli	Fr
WR	86	Landon Gilmore	Fr
TE	87	Christian Earls	Sr
TE	89	Luke Klare	Fr
TE	94	Luke Shorter	Fr

Defense

Pos.	#	Name	Class
DB	0	Tony Grimes	Sr
DB	1	Smiley Bradford	So
DB	2	Richard Toney Jr.	Sr
DB	3	Sterling Smith	Jr
DB	4	Hudauri Hines	So
LB	5	Charles Correa	So
LB	6	Sanders Ellis	So
DE	8	C. J. Madden	Jr
DB	9	Myles Slusher	Sr
LB	10	Alex Sanford Jr.	Jr
LB	11	Carson Dean	So
DB	12	Ryan Turner	Jr
DL	13	T. J. Lindsey (injured)	Fr
DB	15	Vi'Naz Cobb	Fr
LB	16	Mani Powell	Sr
DB	17	Traveon Wright	So
DL	18	Demeco Kennedy	So
DE	19	Landon Brooks	Fr
LB	20	Winston Berglund	So
DB	21	Tahj Ra-El	Sr
DB	22	Chalil Cummings	Fr
DE	23	Trey Smith	So
DB	24	An'Darius Coffey	Sr
DB	25	Hershey McLaurin	Sr
DB	26	Zeke Williams	Jr
LB	27	Owen Davis	So
DB	28	Maxwell Barbee	Fr
DB	29	T. D. Williams	Sr
LB	30	Parker Meese	Fr
DE	31	Finn Goodman	Fr
DB	32	D'Mon Marable	So
DB	35	DJ Greene	Fr
DB	36	Kaleb Richmond	So
LB	37	Joey Sumlin	So
DB	38	Zyntreacs Otey	Fr
DB	39	Aveyawn Madry	Jr
DL	40	Ian Jeffries	So
DE	41	Mason Alnutt	Fr
DB	43	Landon Heard	So
LB	47	B. J. Mayes	So
DB	48	Donivan Taylor	Fr
DB	49	Isaiah Needam	Fr
LB	51	Jaxon Ott	Fr
DL	52	Marcus Moore Jr.	So
DL	53	Josh Burney	Sr
DL	55	Jamarius Dinkins	Sr
DE	58	Breeon Ishmail	So
DL	89	Miles Mitchell	Sr
DL	90	Elijah St. John	Jr
DL	91	C. J. Nunnally IV	Sr
DL	93	Sam Goellner	Fr
DL	95	Breylon Charles	Sr
DL	96	Jordan Cree	Jr
DL	97	Jamarrion Harkless	So
DL	98	Drake Carlson	So

Special teams

Pos.	#	Name	Class
K	26	Jack Weeter	So
K	35	Spencer Porath	So
P	38	Jack McCallister	Sr
LS	46	Luke Raab	Fr
LS	59	Justin Schmidt	Fr
P	93	Seth Turner	So
P	95	Sam Dubwig	Fr

Head coach

- Barry Odom

Coordinators/assistant coaches

- Cornell Ford – Assistant head coach/wide receivers
- Josh Henson – Offensive coordinator / tight ends
- Michael Scherer – Defensive coordinator / linebackers
- James Shibest – Special teams coordinator
- Darin Hinshaw – Quarterbacks
- Vance Vice – Offensive linemen
- Lamar Conard – Running backs
- Charles Clark – Defensive backs
- Kelvin Green – Defensive linemen
- Jake Trump – Defensive ends
- Ronnell Perkins – Senior defensive analyst
- Neal Renna – Senior defensive analyst
- Tony Thompson – Senior special teams analyst
- DeMarkus Acy – Defensive analyst
- Daryl Lydon – Defensive analyst
- Bilal Marshall – Offensive analyst
- Travis Monken – Offensive analyst
- Neal Posey – Offensive analyst
- Ty Rocconi – Defensive analyst
- David Spurlock – Offensive analyst
- Kiero Small – Director, strength and conditioning
- Nate Rock – Associate director, strength and conditioning
- Myles Quimby – Associate director, strength and conditioning
- Greg Robinson – Associate director, strength and conditioning
- Cameron Colbert – Assistant director, strength and conditioning
- Jason Simmons – Director of high school relations

Legend

- (C) Team captain
- (S) Suspended
- (I) Ineligible
- Injured
- Redshirt

Roster
Last update: 11/11/2025

=== Departures ===
==== Outgoing transfers ====
Name	No.	Pos.	Height	Weight	Year	Hometown	New school
Tayvion Galloway	19	TE	6'5"	235	Fr.	Chillicothe, Ohio	Middle Tennessee
Derrick Rogers Jr.	3	CB	6' 1"	175	So.	Orlando, Florida	Florida Atlantic
Mahamane Moussa	77	OT	6' 4"	300	(redshirt) Jr.	Indianapolis, Indiana	Louisville
Koy Beasley	13	S	5' 10"	187	Fr.	Cincinnati, Ohio	Miami (OH)
Anthony Boswell	66	OL	6' 2"	293	Fr.	Indianapolis, Indiana	Toledo
Yanni Karlaftis	14	LB	6' 3"	235	(redshirt) Jr.	West Lafayette, Indiana	Northwestern
Ryan Browne	15	QB	6' 4"	210	(redshirt) Fr.	Clarkston, Michigan	North Carolina
Cole Brevard	91	DL	6' 3"	333	(redshirt) Sr.	Carmel, Indiana	Texas
Dillon Thieneman	31	S	6' 0"	207	So.	Westfield, Indiana	Oregon
Marcos Davila	5	QB	6' 3"	233	Fr.	West Lafayette, Indiana	Nebraska
Jaron Tibbs	13	WR	6' 3"	214	So.	Indianapolis, Indiana	Kansas State
Leland Smith	12	WR	6' 4"	219	So.	Houston, Texas	San Jose State
Will Heldt	15	EDGE	6' 6"	265	So.	Carmel, Indiana	Clemson
Tarrion Grant	12	CB	6' 2"	197	Fr.	Sumter, South Carolina	Texas Tech
Joseph Jefferson II	32	S	6' 0"	190	(redshirt) So.	Indianapolis, Indiana	Western Michigan
Max Klare	86	TE	6' 4"	240	(redshirt) So.	Guilford, Indiana	Ohio State
Drew Biber	82	TE	6' 5"	245	(redshirt) Jr.	Cedarburg, Wisconsin	Minnesota
Keelan Crimmins	30	P	6' 3"	223	Jr.	Spotswood, Victoria, Australia	Illinois
Kyndrich Breedlove	10	CB	5' 11"	165	(redshirt) Jr.	Nashville, Tennessee	Arizona State
Jalen Grant	75	OL	6' 3"	285	(redshirt) Sr.	Chicago, Illinois	NC State
Elijah Jackson	33	RB	5' 10"	191	(redshirt) Fr.	Indianapolis, Indiana	Ball State
Jahmal Edrine	7	WR	6' 3"	215	(redshirt) Jr.	Fort Lauderdale, Florida	Virginia
Botros Alisandro	19	S	6' 1"	186	Jr.	Manchester, New Hampshire	Old Dominion
Demarjhe Lewis	34	DL	6' 3"	300	(redshirt) Sr.	Griffin, Georgia	SMU
Shamar Rigby	16	WR	6' 3"	187	Fr.	St. Petersburg, Florida	Oklahoma State
Nyland Green	2	CB	6' 1"	186	(redshirt) Jr.	Covington, Georgia	Arizona State
C. J. Smith	3	WR	6' 3"	195	(redshirt) So.	Apopka, Florida	Memphis
Jeffrey M'Ba	0	DL	6' 6"	302	(redshirt) Sr.	Libreville, Gabon	SMU
DJ Wingfield	55	OL	6' 4"	316	(redshirt) Sr.	Torrance, California	USC
Anthony Brown	24	S	6' 0"	195	(redshirt) So.	Detroit, Michigan	South Alabama
Antonio Parker		S	6' 0"	170	Fr.	St. Louis, Missouri	
RJ Lopez	36	K	6' 0"	180	Sr.	Mission Viejo, California	Sam Houston
Joe Strickland	9	DL	6' 4"	289	So.	Indianapolis, Indiana	Liberty
Aaron Roberts	61	OL	6' 4"	301	(redshirt) Jr.	Indianapolis, Indiana	Ball State
Markevious Brown	1	CB	5' 11"	176	Sr.	Pahokee, Florida	
Antonio Stevens	11	S	6' 2"	217	(redshirt) Jr.	Nashville, Tennessee	Kennesaw State
Mo Omonode	92	DL	6' 0"	286	Jr.	West Lafayette, Indiana	Minnesota
Jaekwon Bouldin	73	OT	6' 6"	345	Jr.	Canton, Mississippi	Mississippi State
Jimmy Liston	68	OL	6' 3"	305	(redshirt) Fr.	Hinsdale, Illinois	Utah State
Jaden Ball	72	IOL	6' 5"	300	Fr.	Carroll, Ohio	Minnesota
Donovan Hamilton	88	WR	6' 3"	215	Fr.	Fishers, Indiana	Ball State
Ty Hudkins	25	S	5' 11"	197	Fr.	Grand Rapids, Michigan	Iowa
Luke Jones	2	WR	6' 0"	168	(redshirt) Fr.	Deerfield, Illinois	Fresno State
Rod Green	52	OL	6' 5"	330	Jr.	Springfield, Ohio	Charlotte
Hudson Miller	40	LB	6' 0"	230	So.	Indianapolis, Indiana	Toledo
Luke Williams	5	S	5' 11"	155	Fr.	Naperville, Illinois	Austin Peay
Caleb Irving	85	DL	6' 1"	298	Fr.	Glenn Heights, Texas	Charlotte
Earl Kulp	29	CB	6' 0"	187	Fr.	Canton, Ohio	Temple
Jordan King	65	IOL	6' 3"	302	Fr.	Fort Wayne, Indiana	Ball State
EJ Colson		QB	6' 1"	200	Fr.	Ellenwood, Georgia	Incarnate Word
Jayden Dixon-Veal	0	WR	6' 0"	190	Sr.	Rancho Cucamonga, California	California
Isaiah Myers		WR	6' 5"	180	(redshirt) Jr.	Cincinnati, Ohio	Western Kentucky
Jamari Payne	47	EDGE	6' 2"	272	Fr.	Auburn, Alabama	North Alabama
Nathan Leacock		WR	6' 3"	200	(redshirt) Fr.	Raleigh, North Carolina	North Carolina
Jake Wilson	14	QB	6' 2"	190	(redshirt) Fr.	Trophy Club, Texas	Mercer
Joshua Sales Jr.	74	OT	6' 6"	320	Jr.	South Bend, Indiana	Austin Peay
Ryne Shackelford	80	WR	6' 0"	175	(redshirt) Fr.	Elyria, Ohio	Baylor

==== Coaching departures ====
Name	Previous position	New position
Ryan Walters	Head coach	Washington – Defensive coordinator
Cory Patterson	Associate head coach / wide receivers coach	Oklahoma State – Running backs coach
Kevin Kane	Defensive coordinator	Minnesota – Outside backers / nickels coach
Chris Petrilli	Special team coordinator	Washington – Special team coordinator
Sam Carter	Cornerbacks coach	Louisiana Tech – Safeties coach
Joe Dineen	Defensive ends coach	Kansas – Defensive analyst
Brick Haley	Defensive line coach	None
Marcus Johnson	Offensive line coach	Ohio State – Analyst
Grant O'Brien	Safeties coach	None
Justin Sinz	Tight ends coach	None

=== Acquisitions ===
==== Incoming transfers ====
Name	No.	Pos.	Height	Weight	Year	Hometown	Prev. school
CJ Nunnally IV	91	DE	6' 3"	240	Sr.	Douglasville, Georgia	Akron
Malachi Singleton	3	QB	6' 1"	225	(redshirt) Fr.	Kennesaw, Georgia	Arkansas
Alex Sanford	10	LB	6' 1"	225	So.	Oxford, Mississippi	Arkansas
Carson Dean	11	LB	6' 4"	234	(redshirt) Fr.	Carrollton, Texas	Arkansas
Tahj Ra-El	21	S	6' 2"	192	Sr.	Charlotte, North Carolina	Memphis
Breeon Ishmail	58	DE	6' 3"	260	So.	Cincinnati, Ohio	Michigan
Christian Moore	44	TE	6' 3"	240	Sr.	Huntington Beach, California	UNLV
Mason Vicari	51	OL	6' 4"	305	Fr.	Sacramento, California	UNLV
Christian Earls	87	TE	6' 8"	290	Jr.	Chandler, Arizona	UNLV
Hank Purvis	58	OL	6' 5"	330	Fr.	Wichita, Kansas	UNLV
Jalen St. John	74	OL	6' 5"	330	(redshirt) Sr.	Saint Louis, Missouri	UNLV
Tony Grimes	0	DB	6' 2"	190	(redshirt) Sr.	Virginia Beach, Virginia	UNLV
Mani Powell	16	LB	6' 2"	230	Jr.	Fayetteville, Arkansas	UNLV
Chauncey Magwood	5	WR	6' 0"	187	(redshirt) Jr.	Leesburg, Georgia	UCF
EJ Colson		QB	6' 1"	200	Fr.	Ellenwood, Georgia	UCF
Charles Ross	4	WR	6' 1"	165	(redshirt) Sr.	Culver City, California	USC
Malachi Thomas	24	RB	6' 0"	215	(redshirt) Jr.	Hartwell, Georgia	Virginia Tech
Luca Puccinelli	85	TE	6' 6"	250	Fr.	Richmond, Virginia	Wake Forest
Evans Chuba	1	QB	6' 4"	215	(redshirt) Fr.	Montreal, Quebec, Canada	Washington State
Isaiah Myers		WR	6' 5"	180	(redshirt) So.	Cincinnati, Ohio	Charlotte
Nathan Leacock		WR	6' 3"	200	(redshirt) So.	Raleigh, North Carolina	Tennessee
Ryan Turner	12	CB	6' 0"	191	(redshirt) So.	Hollywood, Florida	Boston College
Crew Wakley (Note: Wakley left the program on October 12, 2025.)	7	S	6' 0"	200	(redshirt) Jr.	Raleigh, North Carolina	BYU
Sam Dubwig	95	P	6' 3"	231	Fr.	Cabot, Arkansas	Arkansas
Richard Toney Jr.	2	S	6' 0"	189	(redshirt) Jr.	Arlington, Texas	TCU
Chad Brown		CB	6' 2"	183	(redshirt) Sr.	Lawrenceville, New Jersey	Nevada
TJ Lindsey	13	DL	6' 3"	295	Fr.	Bryant, Arkansas	Auburn
Seth Turner	93	P	6' 1"	195	(redshirt) Fr.	Malvern, Pennsylvania	UConn
Sanders Ellis	6	LB	6' 2"	225	Fr.	Nashville, Tennessee	Tennessee State
Marcus Moore Jr.	52	DL	6' 2"	310	(redshirt) Fr.	Massillon, Ohio	Akron
Jude McCoskey	72	OT	6' 8"	325	So.	Terre Haute, Indiana	Tulane
Bradyn Joiner	55	IOL	6' 2"	310	(redshirt) Fr.	Anniston, Alabama	Auburn
Corey Smith	12	WR	6' 1"	185	Fr.	Brownsburg, Indiana	Tulsa
Chalil Cummings	22	CB	5' 11"	190	Fr.	Starke, Florida	Memphis
Ian Jeffries	40	DL	6' 4"	303	(redshirt) Fr.	Southaven, Mississippi	Arkansas State
Michael Jackson III	2	WR	6' 0"	205	Sr.	Las Vegas, Nevada	Georgia
Nitro Tuggle	0	WR	6' 1"	195	Fr.	Goshen, Indiana	Georgia
Tyrell Green	56	IOL	6' 5"	360	Fr.	Toledo, Ohio	Eastern Kentucky
Marc Nave Jr.	77	IOL	6' 4"	350	Fr.	Toledo, Ohio	Kentucky
Breylon Charles	95	DL	6' 3"	272	Sr.	New Orleans, Louisiana	North Texas
Marques Easley	71	IOL	6' 6"	320	Fr.	Kankakee, Illinois	Georgia
David Washington	19	WR	6' 0"	200	Fr.	Las Vegas, Nevada	Utah
Charles Correa	5	LB	6' 3"	230	Fr.	Kuli'ou'ou, Hawaii	UNLV
Jack McCallister	38	P	6' 0"	213	Jr.	Edmonds, Washington	Nebraska
Traveon Wright	17	CB	6' 0"	190	(redshirt) Fr.	Perry, Georgia	Mississippi State
An'Darius Coffey	14	S	5' 10"	203	Sr.	Winona, Mississippi	Northwestern
Josh Burney	53	DL	6' 3"	330	Sr.	Gray, Georgia	Fort Valley State
Miles Mitchell	89	EDGE	6' 4"	250	Jr.	New Milford, New Jersey	Monmouth
Hershey McLaurin	25	S	6' 2"	210	Sr.	Friendship, Mississippi	Houston
Elijah St. John	90	DL	6' 1"	300	So.	Ottawa, Ontario	LIU
Rico Walker	17	TE	6' 3"	250	So.	Hickory, NC	Auburn
TD Williams	29	CB	6' 1"	205	Sr.	Hollandale, Mississippi	Central Arkansas

==== Coaching acquisitions ====
Name	Previous position	New position
Barry Odom	UNLV – Head coach	Head coach
Cornell Ford	UNLV – Running backs coach	Assistant head coach / wide receivers coach
Josh Henson	USC – Offensive coordinator / quarterbacks coach	Offensive coordinator / tight ends coach
Kelvin Green	Arkansas – Defensive line coach	Defensive line coach
Jake Trump	Arkansas – Defensive quality control	Defensive ends coach
Darin Hinshaw	UCF – Co-offensive coordinator / quarterbacks coach	Quarterbacks coach
Charles Clark	Memphis – Defensive backs coach	Defensive backs coach
Michael Scherer	UNLV – Defensive coordinator / linebackers coach	Defensive coordinator / linebackers coach
James Shibest	UNLV – Special teams coordinator	Special teams coordinator
Vance Vice	UNLV – Offensive line coach	Offensive line coach
