= Elvan George =

American football coach, athletics administrator (1912–1974)

Biographical details
- Born: September 1, 1912; Cumby, Texas, U.S.
- Died: June 21, 1974 (aged 61); Ada, Oklahoma, U.S.

Playing career
- 1932–1934: East Central

Coaching career (HC unless noted)
- 1935–1936: Coalgate HS (OK)
- 1937–1939: Ada HS (OK) (assistant)
- 1940–1958: Ada HS (OK)
- 1959–1971: East Central

Administrative career (AD unless noted)
- 1958–1974: East Central

Head coaching record
- Overall: 92–42–5 (college); 174–52–9 (high school)
- Bowls: 1–3

Accomplishments and honors

Championships
- 4 OCC (1964–1967)

Elvan M. George (September 1, 1912 – June 21, 1974) was an American football coach and athletics administrator. He is known for coaching East Central University in Ada, Oklahoma from 1959 to 1971. Prior to that, he served as head coach at Ada High School in Ada, Oklahoma where his teams won six state championships—1951, 1952, and 1954 to 1957. George was also the athletic director at East Central until his death in 1974.

George died on June 21, 1974, at his home in Ada, after suffering an apparent heart attack.

== Head coaching record ==
=== College ===
Year	Team	Overall	Conference	Standing	Bowl/playoffs
East Central Tigers (Oklahoma Collegiate Conference) (1959–1971)
1959	East Central	8–4	4–2	3rd	L Christmas Festival Bowl
1960	East Central	7–5	4–2	T–2nd	W Rice Bowl
1961	East Central	5–5	3–4	4th	
1962	East Central	9–3	6–1	2nd	L All-Sports Bowl
1963	East Central	8–1–1	5–1–1	2nd	
1964	East Central	9–2–1	6–0–1	1st	L All-Sports Bowl
1965	East Central	9–1	7–0	1st	
1966	East Central	7–3–1	5–1–1	1st	
1967	East Central	8–2	6–1	T–1st	
1968	East Central	7–2–1	5–1–1	2nd	
1969	East Central	6–4–1	4–2–1	4th	
1970	East Central	6–4	4–4	5th	
1971	East Central	3–7	3–5	6th	
East Central:		92–42–5	62–24–5		
Total:		92–42–5			
National championship Conference title Conference division title or championship game berth
