= Michael Scherer (American football) =

American football coach (born 1993)

Current position
- Title: Linebackers coach
- Team: UNLV
- Conference: Mountain West

Biographical details
- Born: November 15, 1993 (age 32); St. Louis, Missouri, U.S.

Playing career
- 2012–2016: Missouri
- Position: Linebacker

Coaching career (HC unless noted)
- 2019: Missouri (GA)
- 2020: Arkansas (def. analyst)
- 2021–2022: Arkansas (LB)
- 2023–2024: UNLV (DC/LB)
- 2025: Purdue (DC/LB)
- 2026–present: UNLV (LB)

Michael Scherer (born November 15, 1993) is an American football coach and former linebacker who is the current Linebackers coach at University of Nevada, Las Vegas. Scherer played college football at Missouri from 2012 to 2016 for head coaches Gary Pinkel and Barry Odom. He served as the defensive coordinator for the UNLV Rebels from 2023 to 2024 and Purdue University in 2025.

== Early life and playing career ==
Scherer attended Mary Institute and St. Louis Country Day School. In high school, Scherer was a standout running back as well as a linebacker. Scherer played for the Missouri Tigers for four seasons between 2012–2016. In his career, he played in 38 games notching 266 tackles with 17 being for a loss, a sack, and an interception.

=== College statistics ===
Year	Team	Tackles						Interceptions				
Year	Team	Solo	Ast	Cmb	TfL	Sck	FF	Int	Yds	Avg	TD	PD
2013	Missouri	4	2	6	1	0.0	0	0	0	0.0	0	0
2014	Missouri	35	55	90	3	0.5	0	0	0	0.0	0	4
2015	Missouri	43	42	85	9	0.0	0	0	0	0.0	0	3
2016	Missouri	24	28	52	3.5	0.5	0	1	19	19.0	0	3
Career		106	127	233	16.5	1.0	0	1	19	19.0	0	7

== Coaching career ==
Scherer got his first career coaching job in 2019 as a graduate assistant for his alma mater the Missouri Tigers. In 2020, Scherer joined the Arkansas Razorbacks as defensive analyst for the Razorbacks. After one season with the Razorbacks, Scherer was promoted in 2021 to serve as the Razorbacks linebackers coach. For the 2022 Liberty Bowl, Scherer was temporarily promoted to serve as the Razorbacks interim defensive coordinator. During his time at Arkansas, Scherer coached players linebackers such as Grant Morgan, Bumper Pool, Hayden Henry and Drew Sanders, where all four of them recorded seasons with 100 tackles under Scherer. Additionally, Sanders was an AP First-Team All-American. In 2023, Scherer was hired by the UNLV Rebels to become the team's defensive coordinator and linebackers coach. Scherer followed Odom to Purdue for the 2025 season. Following the season, it was announced that Scherer would be leaving Purdue to pursue other coaching opportunities.
