= Barry Odom =

American football player and coach (born 1976)

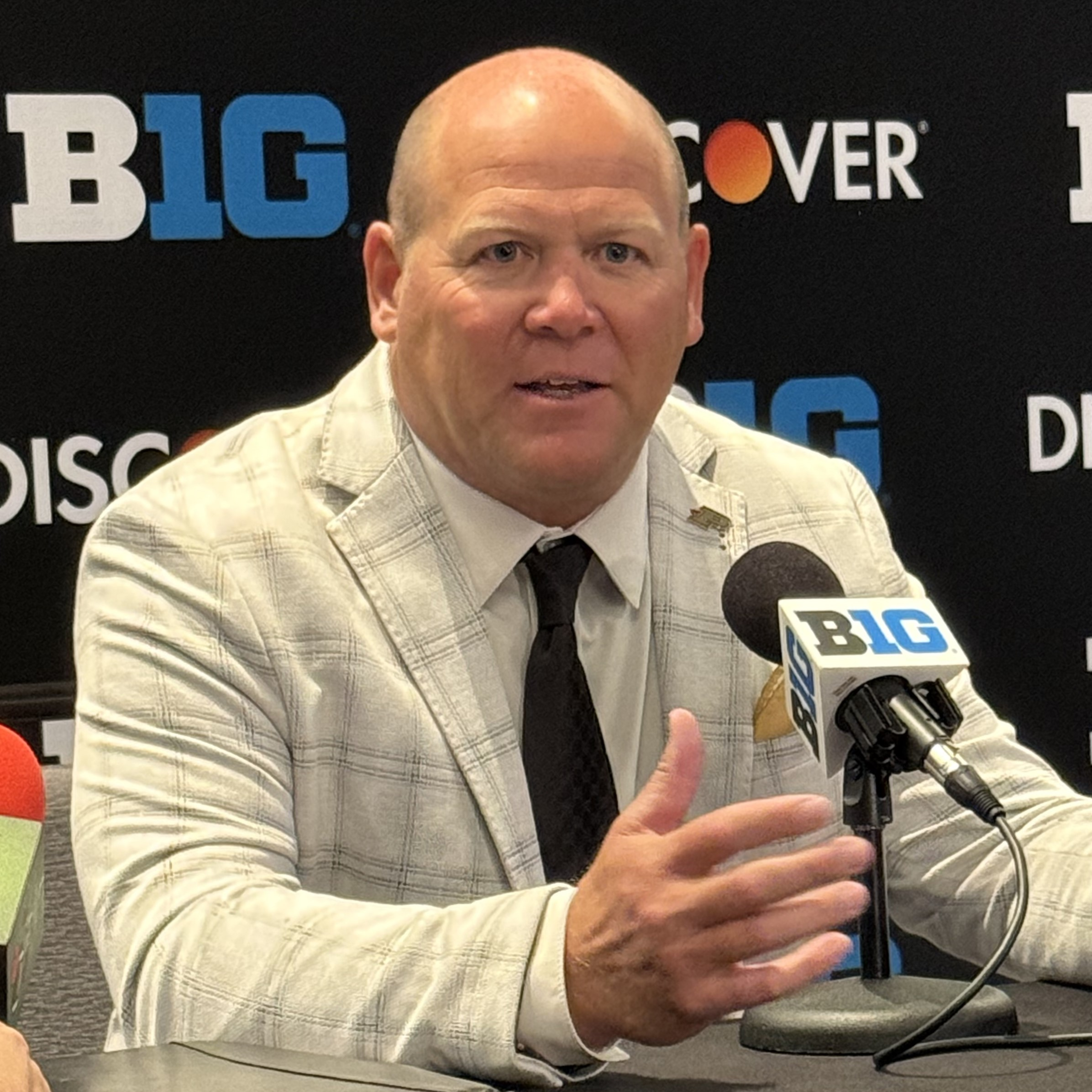
- Barry Odom at 2026 Big Ten Media Day

Current position
- Title: Head coach
- Team: Purdue
- Conference: Big Ten
- Record: 5–18
- Annual salary: $6.5 million

Biographical details
- Born: November 26, 1976 (age 49); Lawton, Oklahoma, U.S.

Playing career
- 1996–1999: Missouri
- Position: Linebacker

Coaching career (HC unless noted)
- 2000: Ada (OK) (assistant)
- 2001–2002: Rock Bridge (MO)
- 2003: Missouri (GA)
- 2004–2005: Missouri (dir. of recruiting)
- 2006–2008: Missouri (DFP)
- 2009–2011: Missouri (S)
- 2012–2014: Memphis (DC/LB)
- 2015: Missouri (DC/LB)
- 2016–2019: Missouri
- 2020–2022: Arkansas (AHC/DC/S)
- 2023–2024: UNLV
- 2025–present: Purdue

Head coaching record
- Overall: 14–8 (high school); 49–51 (college)
- Bowls: 0–3

Accomplishments and honors

Awards
- As a coach: MW Coach of the Year (2023); As a player: Third-team All-Big 12 (1998)

Barry Stephen Odom (born November 26, 1976) is an American college football coach and former player. He is the head football coach at Purdue University, a position he has held since the 2025 season. Odom served as the head coach at the University of Missouri from 2016 to 2019 and the University of Nevada, Las Vegas (UNLV) from 2023 to 2024. He played football as a linebacker at Missouri from 1996 to 1999.

Odom was born in Lawton, Oklahoma. After graduation from high school in 1996, Odom enrolled at the Missouri and played linebacker for the Tigers, starting for four seasons. As a junior, he the 1998 Missouri Tigers football team to the Insight.com Bowl, and was a third-team All-Big 12 Conference selection.

Odom began his coaching career in 2000 as an assistant at Ada High School in Ada, Oklahoma before being named the head coach at Rock Bridge High School in Columbia, Missouri the following year. In 2003, he returned to the Missouri, and worked in a variety of roles before being named safeties coach in 2009. Odom left Missouri in 2012 to become the defensive coordinator at University of Memphis. After helping to lead Memphis to American Athletic Conference championship in 2014, he returned to Missouri in 2015, where he led the Tigers defense.

Odom accepted the job as head coach of Missouri Tigers football program in 2015. He led the team to consecutive bowl games before being relieved of his duties at the conclusion of the 2019 season. On December 19, 2019, Odom was named the defensive coordinator at the University of Arkansas. He helped guide the Razorbacks to back-to-back bowl victories in 2021 and 2022. On December 6, 2022, he was named the head coach of the UNLV, where he led the Rebels to back-to-back Mountain West Conference championship games, their first conference championship game appearances in program history. He was named the head coach at Purdue on December 8, 2024.

== Early life and education ==
Born in Lawton, Oklahoma, on November 26, 1976, Odom is the son of Cheryl and Bob Odom. Odom's father was a teacher and high school football coach. Barry and his brothers Brian and Brad were born in Oklahoma, while his father was an assistant football coach at nearby Maysville High School in Maysville. Odom played high school football as a linebacker and running back, starting for Maysville for three years before transferring to Ada High School in Ada, Oklahoma for his senior season. Odom's first game for Ada High School came in 1994 against their rival, Ardmore. Odom guided the team to a 39–13 victory that night. Ada was so dominant that they outscored their opponents on average 41–10 every week. Odom helped guide Ada to a second straight state title, in a 29–7 win over Clinton, that saw him run for 144 yards and four touchdowns. Odom finished his senior season with 39 touchdowns and 1,477 yards rushing. He was named a Class 4A East All-Star by The Oklahoman as a linebacker. Odom was additionally a track and field star, finishing as the runner-up in the Oklahoma 4A 400-meter dash with a time of 48.64

== College career ==
Odom hoped to stay in-state to play football for Oklahoma or Oklahoma State, but both programs fired their head coaches, and he suffered a torn anterior cruciate ligament (ACL) in his right knee, which caused his recruitment to be stunted. Odom originally signed a national letter of intent to play football at East Central. After Odom ran the 100-meter dash in 10.6 seconds, in the spring of his senior year, Larry Smith offered him a scholarship at the University of Missouri regardless of how his surgery went. The Tigers allowed him to get the surgery done at home instead of coming to Missouri to have the surgery done.

In January 1996, Odom enrolled at Missouri. After just two days on campus, he received a phone called from head coach Larry Smith's office, asking him to come to see Smith. When Odom arrived, Smith informed Odom that his days of playing fullback were over, he would be transitioning to linebacker. Odom wore No. 39 to honor the year the university started, 1839. Odom found himself in the defensive rotation as a true freshman, playing in behind Joe Love. In a road game against Iowa State on September 28, Odom collected a season-high 18 tackles (seven solo), as Troy Davis rushed for an Iowa State school record 378 yards. He led the Tigers in tackles in one game over the course of the season. By the end of the year, he had collected 72 tackles, five tackles for loss, and a pair of sacks.

In the spring of 1997, he tore his left ACL during an April scrimmage. Typically a 9-month recovery time for an ACL surgery, but Odom was able to be on the field again in three and a half months, participating in the Missouri fall preseason camp. In a game against Tulsa, Odom was named the Big 12 Conference Defensive Player of the Week collecting 8 total tackles and an interception. Odom finished the 1997 season second on the team with 103 total tackles, 2 tackles for a loss, and an interception. He was selected as an Honorable Mention All-12 Conference, as well as Missouri's Defensive MVP. The Tigers were invited to the Holiday Bowl, their first bowl invitation since 1983.

With Odom and 1997's leading tackler, Harold Piersey returning in 1998, along with several of the starters on offense, the Tigers were expected to be one of the better teams in the Big 12. They finished second in the Big 12, winning the 1998 Insight.com Bowl 34–31 over West Virginia. The Tigers would finish with a 8–4 record, their most wins in a single season since 1981. He would finish the season with 74 total tackles, 7 tackles for a loss and 1 sack. For his efforts, Odom was named Third Team All-Big 12 Conference.

With a large number of seniors on the 1998 team, the Tigers had a lot of talent to replace. Odom was chosen as a team captain as a senior in 1999 and would go on to finish with 362 tackles — the fourth-most in school history at the conclusion of the 1999 season. At the conclusion of the season Odom was named Honorable Mention All-Big 12 Conference.

Odom earned his bachelor's degree from MU in 1999, and a master's degree in education from MU in 2004.

=== College statistics ===
Year	Team	Tackles						Interceptions				
Year	Team	Solo	Ast	Cmb	TfL	Sck	FF	Int	Yds	Avg	TD	PD
1996	Missouri	36	36	72	5	2	1	0	0	0.0	0	0
1997	Missouri	63	40	103	2	1	0	1	10	10.0	0	4
1998	Missouri	37	37	74	7	1	1	1	0	0.0	0	1
1999	Missouri	67	46	113	10	1	0	1	13	13.0	0	1
Career		203	159	362	24	5.0	2	3	23	7.6	0	6

== Coaching career ==
=== Early career ===
After earning his undergraduate degree in December 1999, he served as an intern with Mizzou's Tiger Scholarship Fund while he worked on his Master's in Education from the University of Missouri (which he would earn in May 2004). He returned to his home state of Oklahoma in July of that year to serve as an assistant football coach for his alma mater Ada High School, which finished that season as runners-up for a state title, losing 17–7 to Carl Albert.

Odom returned to Columbia, Missouri the following year, taking over as head football coach at Rock Bridge High School in February 2001. Odom helped the program turn around, which hadn't had a winning season since 1997. The Bruins went 6–4 in 2001, a two-win improvement from the previous season. The next year, Odom guided Rock Bridge to an 8-4 campaign and an appearance in the Class 6 semifinals. Six weeks after the season ended, Gary Pinkel hired Odom as a graduate assistant at Missouri.

=== Missouri ===
In 2003, Odom returned to Missouri as an administrative graduate assistant. He stayed at Missouri until 2012, serving in numerous different coaching and administrative positions.

==== 2003–2008 ====
Wanting to run a college program, Odom joined the Mizzou staff, first as an administrative graduate assistant for Gary Pinkel in 2003. On July 29, 2004, Pinkel promoted Odom to director of recruiting. Several players recruited during Odom's two seasons as director of recruiting were key members of the Tiger 2007 and 2008 back-to-back North Division Champions.

From 2006 to 2008, Odom helped run Pinkel's program administratively as his director of operations. In that role, Odom oversaw coordination of the team's budget, travel plans (including bowl trips to the Sun, Cotton and Alamo bowls during that stretch), compliance issues, facilities operations and scheduling, as well as assisting with recruiting operations and managing the day-to-day overall operations of the program. As director of football operations, he coordinated all public relations activities and community service events that required the presence of Mizzou's football student-athletes, and also played a role as part of the design and planning team that oversaw the expansion and renovation of the Mizzou Athletics Training Complex, which opened in February 2008.

==== 2009–2011 ====
In 2009, Odom took over as safeties coach under Pinkel, filling the gap in the coaching staff left by Matt Eberflus leaving for the Cleveland Browns. He helped the Tigers climb from 104th in the nation in pass yards allowed/game in 2009, to 37th in the nation in 2010. During his three seasons as safeties coach, the Missouri Tigers went 26–13, including a 2010 Big 12 North division title. The 2010 team defense finished 11th in the nation in defensive pass rating, 19th nationally with 18 interceptions, 12th nationally in touchdowns allowed, 10th nationally in yards/attempt.

=== Defensive coordinator ===
==== Memphis (2012–2014) ====
In 2012, Odom left Missouri to become defensive coordinator of the Memphis Tigers under head coach Justin Fuente. Memphis ranked 117th nationally in total defense in 2011, the season before Odom joined staff. Three years later, Memphis ranked 28th.

Odom became well known due to his performance during three years directing Memphis' defense from 2012 to 2014. His 2014 defense was a key component of Memphis' 10–3 season, as his unit finished the regular season ranked fifth nationally in scoring defense (17.1 avg.) and 22nd in total defense (343.3 avg.). In his first season at Memphis, the defense improved to 50th nationally (383.6 avg.), followed by a jump to 39th in 2013 (370.7 avg.). Memphis earned a share of the 2014 American Athletic Conference title, giving them a conference championship for the first time since 1971.

==== Missouri (2015) ====
After the 2014 season, Missouri needed a new defensive coordinator after Dave Steckel left to become the head coach at Missouri State. Pinkel tabbed Odom as Steckel's replacement, and in 2015, Odom again returned to Missouri, this time to serve as defensive coordinator.

Odom's Tigers ranked ninth in the nation in total defense, allowing just 302.0 yards per game. Since the NCAA began tracking defensive statistics in 1978, this marks the first time in MU history that Mizzou has had a top-10 defense. Odom's defense was also ranked seventh nationally in scoring defense (16.2 avg.), seventh in pass defense (169.2 avg.) and second in tackles for loss (8.8 avg.).

=== Promotion to Missouri HC ===
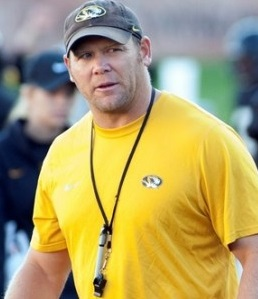
Odom during a Missouri practice, 2015

Odom was named the head coach of the Missouri Tigers football team on December 3, 2015, after former head coach Gary Pinkel retired after 15 seasons due to health-related issues. At 38, Coach Odom was the second youngest head coach for the Missouri Tigers.

==== 2016 ====
On September 3, 2016, Odom lost his first game as head coach of Missouri, a 26–11 road loss against West Virginia. On September 10, Missouri won 61–21 against Eastern Michigan, giving Odom his first win as Missouri's head coach. On September 17, Odom led Missouri to a 28–17 defeat by No. 16-ranked Georgia. On September 24, Odom led the Tigers to a 79–0 shutout win against the Delaware State Hornets. The following month, Missouri lost five consecutive games and their 11-consecutive SEC game, culminating with a 31–21 defeat at the hands of South Carolina He finished his first season as the Tigers' head coach with a 4–8 record, with victories against Eastern Michigan, Delaware State, Vanderbilt, and a redeeming victory in the Battle Line Rivalry over Arkansas, 28–24. After trailing 24–7 at halftime, Missouri scored 21 unanswered points as they held Arkansas scoreless in the second half.

==== 2017 ====
In Odom's 2nd season, Missouri was picked to finish last in the seven-team Southeastern Conference Eastern Division by pre-season experts. In the opening game Missouri beat Missouri State 72–43, with quarterback Drew Lock throwing for a school record 521 yards and 7 touchdowns. In the conference opener, Missouri was defeated by South Carolina 31–13. The following week the Tigers were beaten by Purdue 35–3. The following week, Missouri was manhandled by No. 15 Auburn 51–14. Following the bye week, Missouri went on the road and were defeated by Kentucky 40–34. The next week, the Tigers were defeated by No. 4 Georgia 53–28 for their 5th loss in a row. In a midseason non-conference game, the Tigers defeated Idaho 68–21. Missouri then traveled to East Hartford and left with a 52–12 win over UConn. The following week, Missouri won its first SEC game in dominating fashion over Florida 45–16. On Senior Day, Missouri dominated Tennessee 50–17. Missouri then traveled to Nashville and left with a 45–17 win over Vanderbilt. In the Battle Line Rivalry, the Tigers defeated rival Arkansas 48–45. The win moved Missouri to 7-5 marking an in-season turnaround that saw the Tigers rebound from a 1–5 start on the year. Odom's team earned an invitation to the 2017 Academy Sports + Outdoor Texas Bowl against Texas, losing 33–16. The Tigers ended tied for third at 4–4 in SEC play, becoming the first SEC team to start 0–4 in conference play and finish 4–4. Odom became the first Missouri coach to make a bowl game in his second year since Warren Powers did so in each of his first two seasons in 1978 and 1979. The Tigers finished the season 7–6.

==== 2018 ====
Missouri began the season projected to finish 4th in the East Division. They won their home opener and first game of the season against UT Martin 51–14. The Tigers found their groove over the next two weeks with a 40–13 win over Wyoming and a 40–37 win over Purdue. With those victories, it was the first time Odom had started 2-0 and 3–0. The following week, the Tigers faced the No. 2 Georgia Bulldogs and lost the game 43–29. After the bye week, the Tigers traveled to Columbia, South Carolina where they were defeated by South Carolina 37–35 in the Mayor's Cup. The following week, the Tigers traveled to No. 1 Alabama where they were beaten 39–10. They would get back in the win column after a 65–33 homecoming win over Memphis. The following week, Missouri lost to No. 12 Kentucky 15–14. The following week the Tigers traveled to Gainesville where they pulled out a 38–17 win at No. 11 Florida, that marked Missouri's largest road win over a ranked opponent since 2008. The following week the Tigers defeated Vanderbilt 33–28. The Tiger's completed their road schedule with a 50–17 victory over Tennessee. The Tigers returned home for the Battle Line Rivalry where they shutout Arkansas, 38–0 on senior night. Odom's Tigers finished a regular season ranked No. 23 in the College Football Playoff poll (No. 24 in the Associated Press poll) with eight wins, reached a second-straight bowl game, and achieved another road win. His 8–4 record during the 2018 season, marked just the 17th time in Mizzou's 128-year history that the Tigers have recorded an eight-win regular season. His 19 wins are the most through three seasons by a Tiger coach since Powers won 23 from 1978 to 1980. The No. 23 Tigers lost to the Oklahoma State Cowboys 38–33 in the Liberty Bowl, finishing with an 8–5. After increasing his win total each year since taking over in 2016, Odom's three-year career stands at 19–19. He is only the fourth coach in Mizzou history to reach bowl games in two of his first three seasons at MU, joining College Football Hall of Fame Coach Dan Devine in that category, as well as former coaches Al Onofrio and Powers. On December 5, 2018, Missouri game Odom a contract extension, he had previously been the lowest-paid coach in the conference. Odom's raise paid him $3.05 million a year which ranked 11th among 14 head coaches in the SEC Conference.

==== 2019 ====
To start Odom's fourth season, he and his staff worked to assemble a 2019 signing class that ranked 31st (Rivals.com), a standing that's among the highest-ranked classes ever assembled at Missouri. Odom also convinced transfer quarterback Kelly Bryant to become a Tiger. The former Clemson starter led them to the College Football Playoff in 2017 and had a starting record of 16–2.

Heading into 2019, several national outlets have the Tigers ranked or receiving votes in their preseason top-25 polls. In the SEC, the Tigers were picked to finish 3rd in the East Division. In the rare first game on the road, Missouri traveled to Laramie, Wyoming and were upset by Wyoming 37–31. In the home opener, the Tigers rolled West Virginia 38–7. The next week, Missouri defeated FCS No. 19 Southeast Missouri State, 50–0. In their conference opener, Missouri defeated South Carolina 34–14. In their next game, Missouri defeated Troy 42–10. On homecoming, Missouri, back in conference play, defeated Ole Miss 38–27, leading Missouri to move into #22 in the AP Poll. The following week, the Tigers traveled to Nashville, where they were upset by 1–5 Vanderbilt 21–14. The following week, the Tigers traveled to Kentucky, where they were defeated 29–7. The Tigers next test was a road game at No. 6 Georgia, where they were shutout 29–0. Missouri returned home the following week, where they were beaten by No. 11 Florida, 23–6. On Senior day, the Tigers were narrowly defeated by Tennessee 24–20, securing Odom's season being .500 or worse. Before the team's final week, the NCAA announced that Missouri's appeal for their part in an academic scandal dating back to a 2016 whistleblowing. The sanctions vacated Missouri's wins from 2015 and 2016, as well as banned them from postseason play for the entirety of the 2019–20 academic year. Odom's team won the final regular season game against a 2–9 Arkansas, by a score of 24–14. Odom was fired the next morning, citing a lack of momentum coming from the Tigers 5 game losing streak the second half of the season.

=== Arkansas ===
On December 16, 2019, Odom was hired by new Arkansas Razorbacks head coach Sam Pittman as defensive coordinator. In March, 2020, it was announced that Odom would be given a pay raise to $1.3 million due to another undisclosed SEC team trying hire him. There were questions about what the base defense would be, there were reports of 3–2–6, but Odom described the defense as multiple. Under Odom's watch, the Razorbacks' 18 takeaways during the 2020 campaign ranked 25th nationally. Arkansas' 13 interceptions were second most in the SEC and 13th most in the FBS. Grant Morgan earned First Team All-SEC and Walter Camp Second Team All-America honors after leading the nation in tackles per game. Bumper Pool's team-best 125 stops earned him Second Team All-SEC accolades to go along with Third Team All-America honors. Odom was named a nominee for the Broyles Award. His 2021 defense allowed just 22.9 PPG, 12 fewer per game than in 2020 and the fewest for an Arkansas defense since 2014, and allowed 84 fewer yards of total defense. That Hogs' secondary gave up just 214.2 yards per game as cornerback Montaric Brown led the league with five interceptions to earn First Team All-SEC and Third Team All-America honors. The Razorbacks defeated Penn State in the Outback Bowl and earned a final AP ranking of 24. Odom helped 2022's squad earn a bid to the Liberty Bowl, but there was speculation of him leaving to become the head coach at Tulsa.

=== UNLV ===
On December 6, 2022, the Las Vegas Review-Journal reported Odom was named head football coach at University of Nevada, Las Vegas. This came just two days after talks between Odom and Tulsa had broken down.

==== 2023 ====
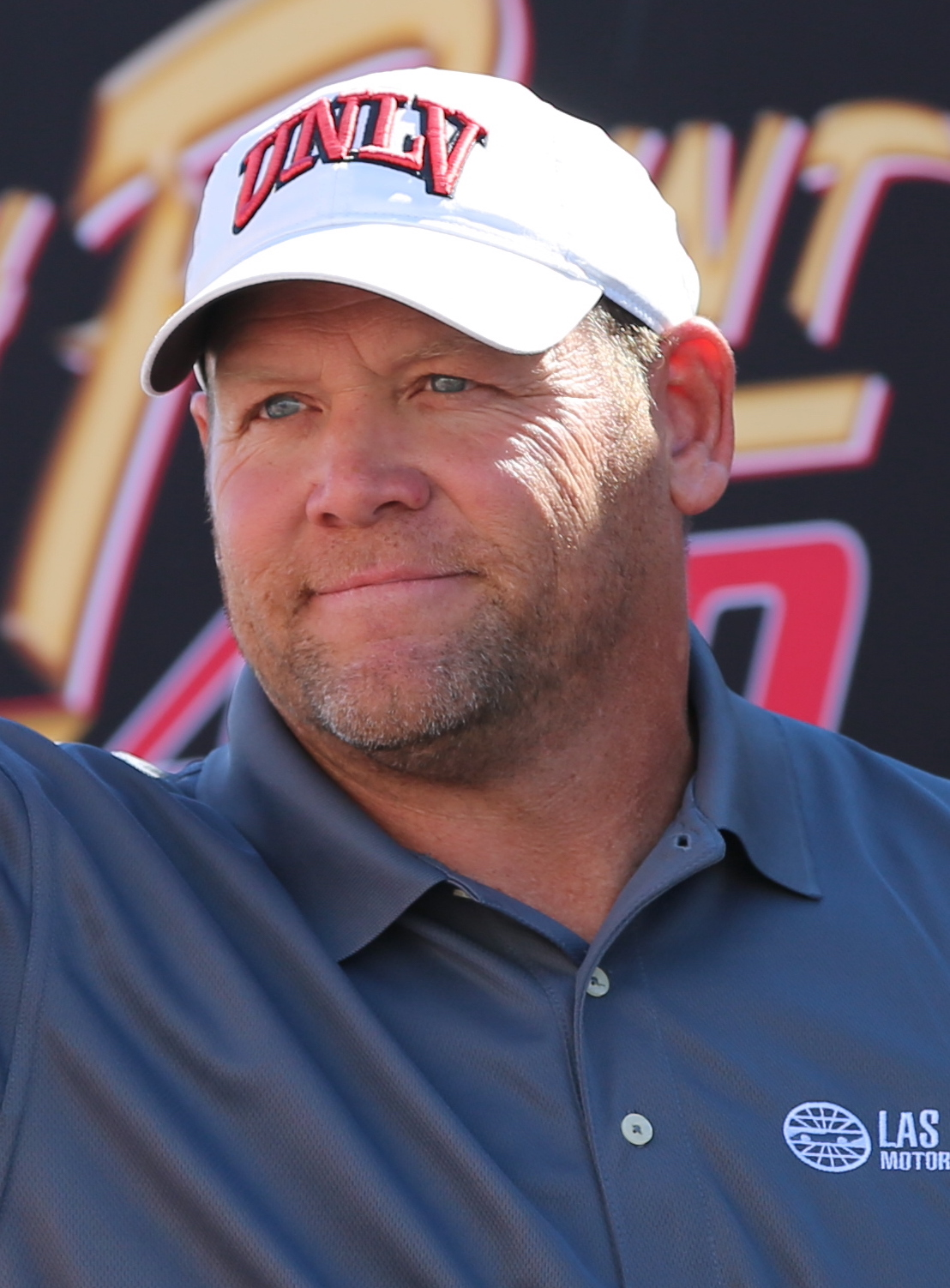
Odom at Las Vegas Motor Speedway in 2024.

In his 1st season, UNLV started the year picked to finish in 9th place in the Mountain West Conference. In the season opener, UNLV defeated Bryant 44–14. UNLV traveled to Ann Arbor, Michigan, for the first time since 2015 to play No. 2 Michigan where they were defeated 35–7. The following week, UNLV defeated Vanderbilt 40–37. The next week, the Rebels traveled to El Paso and defeated UTEP 45–28. In the following game, the Rebels defeated Hawaii 44–20. Following a bye week, in the Fremont Cannon game, Odom got his first win as UNLV's coach against Nevada, winning 45–27 at Mackay Stadium in Reno. On homecoming, the Rebels defeated Colorado State 25–23. The win was the Rebels fifth win in a row, the first time they had achieved such a feat since UNLV. In the following week, UNLV traveled to Fresno in a top two in the Mountain West matchup against Fresno State. Odom suffered his second loss of the season, losing 31–24. UNLV bounced back with a blowout win over New Mexico 56–14. The next week, UNLV defeated Wyoming 34–14. In the following game, the Rebels defeated Air Force 31–27, taking sole possession of first place, and clinching a share of the Mountain West Title. The win secured Odom's Rebels a winning record, something they had not achieved since 2013. In the final week of the regular season, the Rebels were defeated by San Jose State 37–31. UNLV finished the regular season 9-3 and earned the right to play Boise State in the Mountain West Conference Championship Game. In the first time UNLV had qualified for the game, but they were defeated 44–20. The then accepted an offer to the Guaranteed Rate Bowl, where they were defeated by Kansas, 49–36. The Rebels finished the season 9–5. Odom's nine wins were the most wins in a single season at UNLV since 1979, and tied for the second most wins in a single season in UNLV history. For his efforts, he was named the Mountain West Coach of the Year.

==== 2024 ====
On April 12, 2024, Odom received a five-year contract extension at UNLV. During the offseason, the Rebels lost their starting quarterback in the transfer portal to USC, this allowed them to go out and get a transfer of their own, recruiting and landing Matthew Sluka from FCS Holy Cross, who was the reigning Patriot League Player of the Year. The Rebels were picked to finish 2nd in the Mountain West. In the season opener, UNLV defeated Houston 27–7. On the home opener, UNLV routed FCS opponent Utah Tech 72–14. The next week UNLV travelled to Kansas City to play Kansas, where they won 23–20. During the bye week, starting quarterback Matthew Sluka announced on social media he would redshirt and not play in any of the Rebels' remaining games during the 2024 season. Sluka stated that he committed to UNLV based on certain representations that were made to him, and said they were not upheld after he enrolled. This would mark the first time (at least publicly) that a player elected to take a redshirt and transfer in-season due to the player's claim of unsigned, unwritten and unenforceable name, image, and likeness compensation (NIL) agreements not being met. Following a bye week, UNLV avenged one of their three regular season losses from last season defeating Fresno State 59–14, with Hajj-Malik Williams starting at quarterback, leading UNLV to move into No. 25 in the AP Poll. This was UNLV's first appearance in the AP Top 25 ever. The following week, the Rebels suffered their first loss of the season, 44–41 to Syracuse. UNLV returned to conference play with a 50–34 win over Utah Aggies. UNLV traveled to Corvallis, OR winning a close game over Oregon State 33–25. On homecoming, UNLV lost a close game to No. 17 Boise State 29–24. The following week, the Rebels won a closely contested game against Hawaii, 29–27. The following week, UNLV defeated San Diego State 41–20. The win returned the Rebels to the AP Poll, ranking No. 24. The next week UNLV defeated San Jose State 27–16. In the Fremont Cannon, the Rebels defeated Nevada 38–14, to clinch a spot in the Mountain West Conference Championship Game. The win also moved the Rebels to the No. 20 ranking, achieving the highest rating in school history. In the Mountain West Championship, UNLV was defeated by No. 10 Boise State 21–7. Odom's 10 win regular season were tied for the most in UNLV history.

=== Purdue ===
==== 2025 ====
On December 8, 2024, following a meeting with Athletic Director Mike Bobinski, Odom announced that he had accepted an offer to become Purdue's 38th head coach.

On December 10, 2024, at a press conference on the Purdue campus, Odom was officially introduced as the head football coach of Purdue University. Between the Ryan Walters dismissal, and the Odom hiring, Purdue saw unprecedented roster turnover through the NCAA transfer portal, with 82 players on the 2025 roster being new to the program as a high school recruit or a transfer. On September 1, 2025, his Boilermakers opened the season with a 31–0 win over the Ball State Cardinals. Odom became the second Purdue coach since 1916 to start his first season 2–0, earning a win over then-ranked No. 14 (FCS) Southern Illinois Salukis. Purdue ended the regular season with a 2–10 record, including a ten-game losing streak, a loss at Washington, and a second straight loss to Indiana in the Old Oaken Bucket. Just three of Purdue's losses were by seven points or fewer.

== Personal life ==
Born in Lawton, Oklahoma, Odom and his wife Tia were married in July 2000. Tia is a native of Kahoka, Missouri, and is a graduate of the University of Missouri's College of Human Environmental Sciences. The couple have three children.

== Head coaching record ==
=== College ===
Year	Team	Overall	Conference	Standing	Bowl/playoffs	Coaches^{#}	AP^{°}
Missouri Tigers (Southeastern Conference) (2016–2019)
2016	Missouri	4–8 (Note: Missouri vacated all wins for the 2016 season due to NCAA action.)	2–6	7th (Eastern)			
2017	Missouri	7–6	4–4	T–3rd (Eastern)	L Texas		
2018	Missouri	8–5	4–4	T–4th (Eastern)	L Liberty		
2019	Missouri	6–6	3–5	T–4th (Eastern)			
Missouri:		25–25	13–19				
UNLV Rebels (Mountain West Conference) (2023–2024)
2023	UNLV	9–5	6–2	T–1st	L Guaranteed Rate		
2024	UNLV	10–3	6–1	T–2nd	LA (Note: Did not coach bowl game)	24	23
UNLV:		19–8	12–3				
Purdue Boilermakers (Big Ten Conference) (2025–present)
2025	Purdue	2–10	0–9	18th			
2026	Purdue	3–8	2–6				
Purdue:		5–18	2–15				
Total:		49–51					
National championship Conference title Conference division title or championship game berth
