= Nitro Tuggle =

American football player

No. 1 – South Carolina Gamecocks
- Position: Wide receiver
- Class: Junior

Personal information
- Born: Goshen, Indiana, U.S.
- Listed height: 6 ft 1 in (1.85 m)
- Listed weight: 195 lb (88 kg)

Career information
- High school: NorthWood (Nappanee, Indiana)
- College: Georgia (2024); Purdue (2025); South Carolina (2026–present)
- Stats at ESPN

NiTareon "Nitro" Tuggle is an American college football wide receiver for the South Carolina Gamecocks. He previously played for the Georgia Bulldogs and Purdue Boilermakers.

== Early life ==
Tuggle was born in Goshen, Indiana, and attended NorthWood High School in Nappanee, Indiana. He finished his high school career totaling 173 receptions for 2,866 yards and 41 touchdowns. A four-star recruit, Tuggle committed to play college football at the University of Georgia.

== College career ==
As a freshman at Georgia, Tuggle played sparingly, recording three catches for 34 yards. In March 2025, he was arrested for reckless driving and speeding. Tuggle, who was driving 107 miles per hour, was subsequently suspended from the team. Following his suspension, he entered the transfer portal. He transferred to Purdue University to play for the Purdue Boilermakers. In his first season at Purdue as a sophomore, Tuggle earned immediate playing time, catching his first career touchdown pass against Southern Illinois. Against Notre Dame, Tuggle recorded three receptions for 66 yards and a touchdown.

On January 9, 2026, Tuggle announced his decision to transfer to the University of South Carolina to play for the South Carolina Gamecocks.

=== Statistics ===
College statistics
Season	Team	GP	Receiving			
Season	Team	GP	Rec	Yds	Avg	TD
2024	Georgia	8	3	34	11.3	0
2025	Purdue	12	34	500	14.7	4
Career		20	37	534	14.4	4
