= 2014 Missouri Tigers football team =

American college football season

2014 Missouri Tigers football

SEC Eastern Division champion Citrus Bowl champion

SEC Championship Game, L 13–42 vs. Alabama

Citrus Bowl, W 33–17 vs. Minnesota
- Conference: Southeastern Conference
- Eastern Division

Ranking
- Coaches: No. 11
- AP: No. 14
- Record: 11–3 (7–1 SEC)
- Head coach: Gary Pinkel (14th season)
- Offensive coordinator: Josh Henson (2nd season)
- Offensive scheme: Spread
- Defensive coordinator: Dave Steckel (6th season)
- Base defense: 4–3
- Home stadium: Faurot Field

2014 Southeastern Conference football standings
	Conf.			Overall
Team	W		L	W		L
Eastern Division
No. 14 Missouri x	7	–	1	11	–	3
No. 9 Georgia	6	–	2	10	–	3
Florida	4	–	4	7	–	5
Tennessee	3	–	5	7	–	6
South Carolina	3	–	5	7	–	6
Kentucky	2	–	6	5	–	7
Vanderbilt	0	–	8	3	–	9
Western Division
No. 4 Alabama x$^	7	–	1	12	–	2
No. 11 Mississippi State	6	–	2	10	–	3
No. 17 Ole Miss *	5	–	3	9	–	4
No. 22 Auburn	4	–	4	8	–	5
LSU *	4	–	4	8	–	5
Texas A&M	3	–	5	8	–	5
Arkansas	2	–	6	7	–	6
Championship: Alabama 42, Missouri 13
^ – College Football Playoff participant; $ – Conference champion; x – Division champion/co-champions; * LSU and Ole Miss vacated all wins (except for Ole Miss' win over Presbyterian) due to NCAA violations.; Rankings from AP Poll

The 2014 Missouri Tigers football team (also called "Mizzou") represented the University of Missouri in the 2014 NCAA Division I FBS football season. It was the Tigers' third season as a member of the Southeastern Conference (SEC) in the Eastern Division. The team was led by head coach Gary Pinkel, who was in his 14th year, and played its home games at Faurot Field in Columbia, Missouri. They finished the season 11–3, 7–1 in SEC play to be champions of the Eastern Division. They represented the Eastern Division in the SEC Championship Game where they lost to Western Division champions Alabama 13–42. They were invited to the Citrus Bowl where they defeated Minnesota 33–17.

== Recruits ==
Key losses:

- Henry Josey, junior tailback (declared for the 2014 NFL draft), on January 7.
- Kony Ealy, junior defensive end (declared for the 2014 NFL Draft), on January 3.
- Dorial Green-Beckham, junior wide receiver (dismissed from team), on April 11.
- QB James Franklin
- WR L'Damian Washington
- WR Marcus Lucas
- WR Jaleel Clark
- TE Eric Waters
- OL Max Copeland
- OL Justin Britt
- DE Michael Sam
- LB Donovan Bonner
- CB E. J. Gaines
- CB Randy Ponder
- FS Matt White

28 recruits signed their National Letter of Intent on February 5, the National Signing Period.

Missouri's low recruit rankings are similar to past classes. Missouri's ability to recruit under-the-radar prospects and develop them have caught on with other teams around the nation.

College recruiting (2014)
Name	Hometown	School	Height	Weight	40^{‡}	Commit date
Paul Adams; OT	Nashville, TN	Christ Presbyterian Academy	6 ft 6 in (1.98 m)	245 lb (111 kg)	?	May 17, 2013
Paul Adams; OT	Recruit ratings: Scout: Rivals: 247Sports: ESPN:					
Sam Bailey; C	Lamar, MO	Lamar HS	6 ft 5 in (1.96 m)	245 lb (111 kg)	?	Jul 23, 2013
Sam Bailey; C	Recruit ratings: Scout: Rivals: 247Sports: ESPN:					
Andy Bauer; OG	St. Louis, MO	DeSmet Jesuit HS	6 ft 5 in (1.96 m)	295 lb (134 kg)	?	Nov 4, 2013
Andy Bauer; OG	Recruit ratings: Scout: Rivals: 247Sports: ESPN:					
DeSean Blair; WR	Jacksonville, FL	Sandalwood HS	6 ft 4 in (1.93 m)	180 lb (82 kg)	?	Feb 5, 2014
DeSean Blair; WR	Recruit ratings: Scout: Rivals: 247Sports: ESPN:					
Kendall Blanton; TE	Blue Springs, MO	Blue Springs South HS	6 ft 7 in (2.01 m)	225 lb (102 kg)	?	Mar 12, 2013
Kendall Blanton; TE	Recruit ratings: Scout: Rivals: 247Sports: ESPN:					
Walter Brady; DE	Florence, AL	Florence HS	6 ft 4 in (1.93 m)	242 lb (110 kg)	?	Feb 1, 2014
Walter Brady; DE	Recruit ratings: Scout: Rivals: 247Sports: ESPN:					
Nate Brown; WR	Suwanee, GA	North Gwinnett HS	6 ft 3 in (1.91 m)	210 lb (95 kg)	?	Sep 17, 2013
Nate Brown; WR	Recruit ratings: Scout: Rivals: 247Sports: ESPN:					
Logan Cheadle; CB	Lee's Summit, MO	Lee's Summit West HS	5 ft 10 in (1.78 m)	165 lb (75 kg)	4.40	Jun 13, 2013
Logan Cheadle; CB	Recruit ratings: Scout: Rivals: 247Sports: ESPN:					
Kenya Dennis; CB	Raymond, MS	Hinds HS	6 ft 0 in (1.83 m)	196 lb (89 kg)	4.38	Jun 26, 2013
Kenya Dennis; CB	Recruit ratings: Scout: Rivals: 247Sports: ESPN:					
Keyon Dilosa; WR	Round Rock, TX	Round Rock HS	6 ft 4 in (1.93 m)	195 lb (88 kg)	4.46	Jan 26, 2014
Keyon Dilosa; WR	Recruit ratings: Scout: Rivals: 247Sports: ESPN:					
Michael Fairchild; OT	Overland Park, KS	Blue Valley West HS	6 ft 6 in (1.98 m)	270 lb (120 kg)	?	May 13, 2013
Michael Fairchild; OT	Recruit ratings: Scout: Rivals: 247Sports: ESPN:					
Darnell Green-Beckham; WR	Springfield, MO	Hillcrest HS	6 ft 5 in (1.96 m)	185 lb (84 kg)	?	Mar 2, 2013
Darnell Green-Beckham; WR	Recruit ratings: Scout: Rivals: 247Sports: ESPN:					
Grant Jones; DE	Columbia, MO	Columbia-Hickman HS	6 ft 3 in (1.91 m)	215 lb (98 kg)	4.90	Mar 2, 2013
Grant Jones; DE	Recruit ratings: Scout: Rivals: 247Sports: ESPN:					
Brandon Lee; OLB	Indianapolis, IN	Lawrence Central HS	6 ft 3 in (1.91 m)	210 lb (95 kg)	?	Nov 8, 2013
Brandon Lee; OLB	Recruit ratings: Scout: Rivals: 247Sports: ESPN:					
Lawrence Lee; WR	Pensacola, FL	West Florida HS technical	5 ft 11 in (1.80 m)	175 lb (79 kg)	?	Jul 22, 2013
Lawrence Lee; WR	Recruit ratings: Scout: Rivals: 247Sports: ESPN:					
Rocel McWilliams; DE	Pensacola, FL	West Florida HS	6 ft 3 in (1.91 m)	240 lb (110 kg)	?	Apr 20, 2013
Rocel McWilliams; DE	Recruit ratings: Scout: Rivals: 247Sports: ESPN:					
Kevin Pendleton; OT	Lee's Summit, MO	Lee's Summit West HS	6 ft 5 in (1.96 m)	310 lb (140 kg)	?	May 8, 2013
Kevin Pendleton; OT	Recruit ratings: Scout: Rivals: 247Sports: ESPN:					
Thomas Richard; WR	Nashville, TN	Christ Presbyterian Academy	6 ft 0 in (1.83 m)	185 lb (84 kg)	?	Apr 28, 2013
Thomas Richard; WR	Recruit ratings: Scout: Rivals: 247Sports: ESPN:					
Tavon Ross; S	Cochran, GA	Bleckley County HS	6 ft 1 in (1.85 m)	196 lb (89 kg)	?	Aug 26, 2013
Tavon Ross; S	Recruit ratings: Scout: Rivals: 247Sports: ESPN:					
Finus Stribling; CB	Thompson's Station, TN	Independence HS	6 ft 0 in (1.83 m)	170 lb (77 kg)	?	May 13, 2013
Finus Stribling; CB	Recruit ratings: Scout: Rivals: 247Sports: ESPN:					
Greg Taylor; S	East St. Louis, IL	East St. Louis Senior HS	5 ft 11 in (1.80 m)	176 lb (80 kg)	?	Apr 11, 2013
Greg Taylor; S	Recruit ratings: Scout: Rivals: 247Sports: ESPN:					
Trevon Walters; RB	Bradenton, FL	Manatee HS	5 ft 11 in (1.80 m)	194 lb (88 kg)	4.53	Aug 26, 2013
Trevon Walters; RB	Recruit ratings: Scout: Rivals: 247Sports: ESPN:					
Spencer Williams; DE	Jacksonville, FL	First Coast HS	6 ft 4 in (1.93 m)	230 lb (100 kg)	?	Feb 5, 2014
Spencer Williams; DE	Recruit ratings: Scout: Rivals: 247Sports: ESPN:					
Thomas Wilson; ATH	Buford, GA	Buford HS	5 ft 11 in (1.80 m)	180 lb (82 kg)	4.41	Sep 17, 2013
Thomas Wilson; ATH	Recruit ratings: Scout: Rivals: 247Sports: ESPN:					
Raymond Wingo; CB	St. Louis, MO	St. Louis University HS	6 ft 1 in (1.85 m)	174 lb (79 kg)	?	Dec 17, 2013
Raymond Wingo; CB	Recruit ratings: Scout: Rivals: 247Sports: ESPN:					
Roderick Winters; OLB	Arlington, TX	Bowie HS	6 ft 1 in (1.85 m)	200 lb (91 kg)	4.52	Jul 21, 2013
Roderick Winters; OLB	Recruit ratings: Scout: Rivals: 247Sports: ESPN:					
Ish Witter; RB	Tampa, FL	Alonso HS	5 ft 8 in (1.73 m)	180 lb (82 kg)	?	Sep 26, 2013
Ish Witter; RB	Recruit ratings: Scout: Rivals: 247Sports: ESPN:					
Marvin Zanders; QB	Jacksonville, FL	William M. Raines HS	6 ft 3 in (1.91 m)	185 lb (84 kg)	?	Aug 2, 2013
Marvin Zanders; QB	Recruit ratings: Scout: Rivals: 247Sports: ESPN:					
Overall recruit ranking: Scout: 32 Rivals: 35 247Sports: 39 ESPN: 33
‡ Refers to 40-yard dash; Note: In many cases, Scout, Rivals, 247Sports, On3, and ESPN may conflict in their listings of height, weight and 40 time.; In these cases, the average was taken. ESPN grades are on a 100-point scale.; Sources: "Missouri 2014 Football Commitments". Rivals.; "2014 Missouri Commits". Scout.; "2014 Player Commitments – Missouri". ESPN.; "Scout.com Team Recruiting Rankings". Scout.; "2014 Team Ranking". Rivals.com.

== Schedule ==
Date	Time	Opponent	Rank	Site	TV	Result	Attendance
August 30	2:30 p.m.	No. 10 (FCS) South Dakota State*	No. 24	Faurot Field; Columbia, MO	ESPNU	W 38–18	60,589
September 6	11:00 a.m.	at Toledo*	No. 24	Glass Bowl; Toledo, OH	ESPN	W 49–24	24,196
September 13	11:00 a.m.	UCF*	No. 20	Faurot Field; Columbia, MO	SECN	W 38–10	60,348
September 20	3:00 p.m.	Indiana*	No. 18	Faurot Field; Columbia, MO	SECN	L 27–31	66,455
September 27	6:00 p.m.	at No. 13 South Carolina		Williams-Brice Stadium; Columbia, SC (College GameDay)	ESPN	W 21–20	83,493
October 11	11:00 a.m.	No. 13 Georgia	No. 23	Faurot Field; Columbia, MO	CBS	L 0–34	71,168
October 18	6:00 p.m.	at Florida		Ben Hill Griffin Stadium; Gainesville, FL	ESPN2	W 42–13	89,117
October 25	3:00 p.m.	Vanderbilt^{†}		Faurot Field; Columbia, MO	SECN	W 24–14	65,264
November 1	3:00 p.m.	Kentucky		Faurot Field; Columbia, MO (SEC Nation)	SECN	W 20–10	62,004
November 15	6:30 p.m.	at No. 24 Texas A&M		Kyle Field; College Station, TX (SEC Nation)	SECN	W 34–27	104,756
November 22	6:30 p.m.	at Tennessee	No. 20	Neyland Stadium; Knoxville, TN (SEC Nation)	ESPN	W 29–21	95,821
November 28	1:30 p.m.	Arkansas	No. 17	Faurot Field; Columbia, MO (rivalry)	CBS	W 21–14	71,168
December 6	3:00 p.m.	vs. No. 1 Alabama	No. 16	Georgia Dome; Atlanta, GA (SEC Championship Game / SEC Nation)	CBS	L 13–42	73,526
January 1	12:00 p.m.	vs. No. 25 Minnesota*	No. 16	Orlando Citrus Bowl Stadium; Orlando, FL (Citrus Bowl)	ABC	W 33–17	48,624
*Non-conference game; ^{†}Homecoming; Rankings from AP Poll and CFP Rankings after October 28 released prior to game; All times are in Central time

Schedule, as of December 8, 2013 (Retrieved: January 7, 2014)

== Game summaries ==
=== South Dakota State ===
Game One: South Dakota State Jackrabbits at No.24 Missouri Tigers – Game summary

Quarter	1	2	3	4	Total
South Dakota State	7	3	8	0	18
No.24 Missouri	21	0	7	10	38

at Faurot Field • Columbia, Missouri

- Date: August 30, 2014
- Game time: 2:30 p.m. CDT
- Game weather: Temperature: 87 °F (31 °C) • Wind: 6 mph (9.7 km/h) SW • Weather: Partly sunny
- Game attendance: 60,589
- Referee: Penn Wagers
- TV announcers (ESPNU): Clay Matvick, Anthony Becht, and Cara Capuano

Game information

First Quarter

- 14:54 Missouri (7-0) - Darius White 44 yard pass from Maty Mauk (Andrew Baggett kick)
- 14:10 SDSU (7-7) - Zach Zenner 75 yard run (Justin Syrovatka kick)
- 8:08 Missouri (14-7) - Darius White 39 yard pass from Maty Mauk (Andrew Baggett kick)
- 6:52 Missouri (21-7) - Russell Hansbrough 10 yard run (Andrew Baggett kick)

Second Quarter

- 5:16 SDSU (21-10) - 39 yard kick by Justin Syrovatka

Third Quarter

- 11:03 SDSU (21-18) - Zach Zenner 3 yard run (2 point conv)
- 10:28 Missouri (28-18) - Marcus Murphy returned kickoff 100 yards (Andrew Baggett kick)

Fourth Quarter

- 11:41 Missouri (35-18) - Bud Sasser 29 yard pass from Maty Mauk (Andrew Baggett kick)
- 2:33 Missouri (38-18) - 44 yard kick by Andrew Baggett

Passing

- SDSU – Zach Lujan 21/28, 239 yards, 0 TD, 1 INT
- MIZZ – Maty Mauk 13/21, 178 yards, 3 TD, 0 INT

Rushing

- SDSU – Zach Zenner 17 carries, 103 yards, 2 TD
- MIZZ – Russell Hansbrough 20 carries, 126 yards, 1 TD

Receiving

- SDSU – Jake Wieneke 6 receptions, 107 yards, 0 TD
- MIZZ – Darius White 2 receptions, 83 yards, 2 TD

Tackling

- SDSU – T. J. Lally 11 tackles
- MIZZ – Markus Golden 10 tackles, 1.5 sacks

=== Toledo ===
No.24 Missouri Tigers at Toledo Rockets – Game summary

Quarter	1	2	3	4	Total
No.24 Missouri	14	14	14	7	49
Toledo	7	0	14	3	24

at Glass Bowl • Toledo, Ohio

- Date: September 6, 2014
- Game time: 11:00 a.m. CDT
- Game weather: Temperature: 66 °F (19 °C) • Wind: 8 mph (13 km/h) NW • Weather: Cloudy skies
- Game attendance: 24,196
- Referee: Matt Austin
- TV announcers (ESPN): Bob Wischusen, Matt Millen, and Quint Kessenich

Game information

First Quarter

- 10:54 Missouri (7-0) - Russell Hansbrough 16 yard run (Andrew Baggett kick)
- 4:54 Toledo (7-7) - Kareem Hunt 38 yard run (Jeremiah Detmer kick)
- 3:12 Missouri (14-7) - Darius White 7 yard pass from Maty Mauk (Andrew Baggett kick)

Second Quarter

- 13:20 Missouri (21-7) - Maty Mauk 1 yard run (Andrew Baggett kick)
- 6:29 Missouri (28-7) - Jimmie Hunt 13 yard pass from Maty Mauk (Andrew Baggett kick)

Third Quarter

- 9:37 Missouri (35-7) - Marcus Murphy 13 yard pass from Maty Mauk (Andrew Baggett kick)
- 7:55 Toledo (35-14) - Kareem Hunt 1 yard run (Jeremiah Detmer kick)
- 5:56 Toledo (35-21) - Kareem Hunt 1 yard run (Jeremiah Detmer kick)
- 4:21 Missouri (42-21) - Bud Sasser 25 yard pass from Maty Mauk (Andrew Baggett kick)

Fourth Quarter

- 7:35 Missouri (49-21) - Jimmie Hunt 12 yard pass from Maty Mauk (Andrew Baggett kick)
- 1:17 Toledo (49-24) - 40 yard kick by Jeremiah Detmer

Passing

- MIZZ – Maty Mauk 21/32, 325 yards, 5 TD, 2 INT
- UT – Phillip Ely 17/34, 204 yards, 0 TD, 1 INT

Rushing

- MIZZ – Russell Hansbrough 18 carries, 84 yards, 1 TD
- UT – Kareem Hunt 15 carries, 148 yards, 3 TD

Receiving

- MIZZ – Bud Sasser 5 receptions, 121 yards, 1 TD
- UT – Alonzo Russell 6 receptions, 89 yards, 0 TD

Tackling

- MIZZ – Michael Scherer 9 tackles
- UT – Dejuan Rogers 8 tackles

=== UCF ===
UCF Knights at No.20 Missouri Tigers – Game summary

Quarter	1	2	3	4	Total
Central Florida	3	7	0	0	10
No.20 Missouri	7	7	7	17	38

at Faurot Field • Columbia, Missouri

- Date: September 13, 2014
- Game time: 11:00 a.m. CDT
- Game weather: Temperature: 52 °F (11 °C) • Wind: 5 mph (8.0 km/h) NE • Weather: Sunny
- Game attendance: 60,348
- Referee: John McDaid
- TV announcers (SECN): Dave Neal (play-by-play), Andre Ware (color commentator), and Laura Rutledge (sideline reporter)
- Recap

Game information

First Quarter

- 10:11 Missouri (7-0) - Jimmie Hunt 11 yard pass from Maty Mauk (Andrew Baggett kick)
- 3:30 UCF (7-3) - 19 yard kick by Shawn Moffitt

Second Quarter

- 12:17 UCF (7-10) - W. Stanback 2 yard pass from Justin Holman (Shawn Moffitt kick)
- 6:12 Missouri (14-10) - Jimmie Hunt 10 yard pass from Maty Mauk (Andrew Baggett kick)

Third Quarter

- 1:43 Missouri (21-10) - Bud Sasser 21 yard pass from Maty Mauk (Andrew Baggett kick)

Fourth Quarter

- 11:32 Missouri (28-10) - Bud Sasser 22 yard pass from Maty Mauk (Andrew Baggett kick)
- 4:13 Missouri (31-10) - 26 yard kick by Andrew Baggett
- 0:13 Missouri (38-10) - Singleton 60 yard fumble recovery (Andrew Baggett kick)

Passing

- UCF – Justin Holman 22/36, 209 yards, 1 TD, 2 INT
- MIZZ – Maty Mauk 14/24, 144 yards, 4 TD, 1 INT

Rushing

- UCF – W. Stanback 15 carries, 33 yards
- MIZZ – Marcus Murphy 15 carries, 94 yards

Receiving

- UCF – Rannell Hall 8 receptions, 73 yards
- MIZZ – Bud Sasser 5 receptions, 57 yards, 2 TD

Tackling

- UCF – T. Plummer 12 tackles
- MIZZ – Michael Scherer 10 tackles, 1 FR

=== Indiana ===
Indiana Hoosiers at No.18 Missouri Tigers – Game summary

Quarter	1	2	3	4	Total
Indiana	7	10	7	7	31
No.18 Missouri	7	10	0	10	27

at Faurot Field • Columbia, Missouri

- Date: September 20, 2014
- Game time: 3:00 p.m. CDT
- Game weather: Temperature: 85 °F (29 °C) • Wind: 13 mph (21 km/h) WSW • Weather: Partly Cloudy
- Game attendance: 66,455
- Referee: David Smith
- TV announcers (SECN): Dave Neal, Andre Ware, and Laura Rutledge

Game information

First Quarter

- 5:18 Indiana (0-7) - Tevin Coleman 1 yard run (A. Del Grosso kick)
- 3:12 Missouri (7-7) - Jimmie Hunt 45 yard pass from Maty Mauk (Andrew Baggett kick)

Second Quarter

- 12:50 Indiana (7-14) - D. Roberts 1 yard run (A. Del Grosso kick)
- 6:50 Missouri (14-14) - Russell Hansbrough 68 yard run (Andrew Baggett kick)
- 2:42 Missouri (17-14) - 27 yard kick by Andrew Baggett
- 00:00 Indiana (17-17) - 23 yard kick by A. Del Grosso

Third Quarter

- 0:54 Indiana (17-24) - J. Harris II 33 yard pass from Nate Sudfeld (Griffin Oakes kick)

Fourth Quarter

- 13:20 Missouri (24-24) - Sean Culkin 1 yard pass from Maty Mauk (Andrew Baggett kick)
- 2:20 Missouri (27-24) - 40 yard kick by Andrew Baggett
- 0:22 Indiana (27-31) - D. Roberts 3 yard run (Griffin Oakes kick)

Passing

- IU – Nate Sudfeld 18/33, 252 yards, 1 TD
- MIZZ – Maty Mauk 29/48, 331 yards, 2 TD, 1 INT

Rushing

- IU – Tevin Coleman 19 carries, 132 yards, 1 TD
- MIZZ – Russell Hansbrough 10 carries, 119 yards, 1 TD

Receiving

- IU – Shane Wynn 6 receptions, 60 yards
- MIZZ – Bud Sasser 12 receptions, 153 yards

Tackling

- IU – T.J. Simmons 6 tackles
- MIZZ – Michael Scherer 13 tackles

=== South Carolina ===
Missouri Tigers at No.13 South Carolina Gamecocks – Game summary

Quarter	1	2	3	4	Total
Missouri	7	0	0	14	21
No.13 South Carolina	3	7	3	7	20

at Williams-Brice Stadium • Columbia, South Carolina

- Date: September 27, 2014
- Game time: 6:00 p.m. CDT
- Game weather: Temperature:74 °F (23 °C) • Wind:5 mph (8.0 km/h) NE • Weather:Partly Cloudy
- Game attendance: 83,493
- Referee: Ken Williamson
- TV announcers (ESPN): Brad Nessler, Todd Blackledge, and Holly Rowe

Game information

First Quarter

- 12:06 Missouri (7-0) - Russell Hansbrough 18 yard run (Andrew Baggett kick)
- 2:07 South Carolina (7-3) - 33 yard kick by Elliot Fry

Second Quarter

- 1:36 South Carolina (7-10) - Mike Davis 17 yard run (Elliot Fry kick)

Third Quarter

- 6:38 South Carolina (7-13) - 41 yard kick by Elliot Fry

Fourth Quarter

- 7:25 South Carolina (7-20) - Pharoh Cooper 23 yard pass from Dylan Thompson (Elliot Fry kick)
- 6:49 Missouri (14-20) - Russell Hansbrough 1 yard run (Andrew Baggett kick)
- 1:36 Missouri (21-20) - Russell Hansbrough 1 yard run (Andrew Baggett kick)

Passing

- MIZZ – Maty Mauk 12/34, 132 yards
- SC – Dylan Thompson 21/37, 219 yards, 1 TD

Rushing

- MIZZ – Marcus Murphy 16 carries, 98 yards
- SC – Mike Davis 22 carries, 104 yards, 1 TD

Receiving

- MIZZ – Bud Sasser 6 receptions, 86 yards
- SC – Nick Jones 5 receptions, 72 yards

Tackling

- MIZZ – Kentry Brothers 10 tackles, 2 TFL
- SC – J.T. Surratt 7 tackles, 1.5 TFL, 1 sack

=== Georgia ===
No.13 Georgia Bulldogs at No.23 Missouri Tigers – Game summary

Quarter	1	2	3	4	Total
No.13 Georgia	6	14	7	7	34
No.23 Missouri	0	0	0	0	0

at Faurot Field • Columbia, Missouri

- Date: October 11, 2014
- Game time: 11:00 a.m. CDT
- Game weather: Temperature: 55 °F (13 °C) • Wind: 9 mph (14 km/h) ENE • Weather: Sunny
- Game attendance: 71,168
- Referee: Hubert Owens
- TV announcers (CBS): Carter Blackburn, Aaron Taylor, and Jamie Erdahl

Game information

First Quarter

- 8:54 Georgia (3-0) - 47 yard kick by Marshall Morgan
- 2:07 Georgia (6-0) - 29 yard kick by Marshall Morgan

Second Quarter

- 10:57 Georgia (13-0) - 11 yard run by Hutson Mason (Marshall Morgan kick)
- 5:32 Georgia (20-0) - Michael Bennett 9 yard run by Hutson Mason (Marshall Morgan kick)

Third Quarter

- 0:47 Georgia (27-0) - 15 yard run by Brendan Douglas (Marshall Morgan kick)

Fourth Quarter

- 7:46 Georgia (34-0) - 9 yard run by Nick Chubb (Marshall Morgan kick)

Passing

- UGA – Hutson Mason, 22/28, 156 yards, 1 TD
- MIZZ – Maty Mauk, 9/21, 97 yards, 4 INT

Rushing

- UGA – Nick Chubb, 38 carries, 143 yards, 1 TD
- MIZZ – Marcus Murphy, 7 carries, 34 yards

Receiving

- UGA – Michael Bennett, 5 receptions, 53 yards, 1 TD
- MIZZ – J'Mon Moore, 2 receptions, 33 yards

Tackling

- UGA – Tim Kimbrough, 4 tackles
- MIZZ – Kentrell Brothers, 12 tackles

=== Florida ===
Missouri Tigers at Florida Gators – Game summary

Quarter	1	2	3	4	Total
Missouri	14	6	22	0	42
Florida	0	0	7	6	13

at Ben Hill Griffin Stadium • Gainesville, Florida

- Date: October 18, 2014
- Game time: 7:11 p.m. CDT
- Game weather: Temperature: 79 °F (26 °C) • Wind: calm • Weather: 52% humidity
- Game attendance: 89,117
- Referee: Matt Loeffler
- TV announcers (ESPN2): Joe Tessitore, Brock Huard, Shannon Spake

Game information

First Quarter

- 14:49 Missouri (7-0) - Marcus Murphy 96 yard kickoff return (Andrew Baggett kick)
- 3:50 Missouri (14-0) - Marcus Murphy 5 yard run (Andrew Baggett kick)

Second Quarter

- 8:38 Missouri (17-0) - 25 yard kick by Andrew Baggett
- 4:21 Missouri (20-0) - 34 yard kick by Andrew Baggett

Third Quarter

- 13:01 Missouri (28-0) - Marcus Murphy 82 yard punt return (2 pt converted)
- 7:25 Missouri (35-0) - Marcus Golden 21 yard fumble recovery (Andrew Baggett kick)
- 5:57 Missouri (42-0) - Darvin Ruise 46 yard interception return (Andrew Baggett kick)
- 1:43 Florida (42-7) - T. Westbrook 5 yard pass from T. Harris (F. Velez kick)

Fourth Quarter

- 0:26 Florida (42-13) - 3 yard run by T. Harris (F. Velez kick blocked)

Passing

- MIZZ – Maty Mauk 6/18, 20 yards, 1 INT
- UF – T. Harris 8/12, 98 yards, 1 TD, 1 INT

Rushing

- MIZZ – Maty Mauk 7 carries, 38 yards
- UF – K. Taylor 12 carries, 56 yards

Receiving

- MIZZ – Bud Sasser 3 receptions, 9 yards
- UF – D. Robinson 4 receptions, 48 yards

Tackling

- MIZZ – Kenya Dennis 8 tackles, 1 TFL, 1 FF
- UF – K. Neal 10 tackles, 1 TFL

=== Vanderbilt ===
Vanderbilt Commodores at Missouri Tigers – Game summary

Quarter	1	2	3	4	Total
Vanderbilt	0	7	0	7	14
Missouri	3	7	7	7	24

at Faurot Field • Columbia, Missouri

- Date: October 25, 2014
- Game time: 3:00 p.m. CDT
- Game weather: Temperature: 76 °F (24 °C) • Wind: 3 mph (4.8 km/h) NNW • Weather: Sunny and clear
- Game attendance: 65,264
- Referee: Marc Curles
- TV announcers (SECN): Tom Hart, Matt Stinchcomb, and Kayce Smith (sideline)

Game information

First Quarter

- 10:59 Missouri (3-0) - 37 yd kick by Andrew Baggett

Second Quarter

- 3:19 Missouri (10-0) - Russell Hansbrough run for 10 yds for a TD (Andrew Baggett kick)
- 0:08 Vanderbilt (10-7) - Johnny McCrary pass complete to Nathan Marcus for 9 yds for a TD (Tommy Openshaw kick)

Third Quarter

- 2:27 Missouri (17-7) - Maty Mauk pass complete to Bud Sasser for 13 yds for a TD (Andrew Baggett kick)

Fourth Quarter

- 6:53 Vanderbilt (17-14) - Johnny McCrary pass complete to C.J. Duncan for 29 yds for a TD (Tommy Openshaw kick)
- 2:05 Missouri (24-14) - Maty Mauk pass complete to Bud Sasser for 25 yds for a TD, (Andrew Baggett kick)

Passing

- VU – Johnny McCrary, 17/31, 196 yards, 2 TD, 1 INT
- MIZZ – Maty Mauk, 11/23, 141 yards, 2 TD

Rushing

- VU – Ralph Webb, 16 carries, 34 yards
- MIZZ – Marcus Murphy, 16 carries, 93 yards

Receiving

- VU – Steven Scheu, 6 receptions, 81 yards
- MIZZ – Bud Sasser, 5 receptions, 74 yards, 2 TD

Tackling

- VU – Nigel Bowden, 11 tackles
- MIZZ – Kentrell Brothers, 6 tackles

=== Kentucky ===
Kentucky Wildcats at Missouri Tigers – Game summary

Quarter	1	2	3	4	Total
Kentucky	0	3	0	7	10
Missouri	0	14	3	3	20

at Faurot Field • Columbia, Missouri

- Date: November 1, 2014
- Game time: 3:00 p.m. CDT
- Game weather: Temperature: 48 °F (9 °C) • Wind: 4 mph (6.4 km/h) ESE • Weather: Mostly sunny
- Game attendance: 62,004
- Referee: Penn Wagers
- TV announcers (SECN): Brent Musburger, Jesse Palmer, and Maria Taylor

Game information

First Quarter

No scoring plays

Second Quarter

- 12:56 Missouri (7-0) - Bud Sasser 3 yard pass from Maty Mauk (Andrew Baggett kick)
- 9:35 Kentucky (7-3) - 47 yard kick by A. MacGinnis
- 5:26 Missouri (14-3) - Bud Sasser 26 yard pass from Maty Mauk (Andrew Baggett kick)

Third Quarter

- 3:42 Missouri (17-3) - 41 yard kick by Andrew Baggett

Fourth Quarter

- 7:23 Missouri (20-3) - 21 yard kick by Andrew Baggett
- 3:26 Kentucky (20-10) - J. Blue 1 yard pass from P. Towles (A. MacGinnis kick)

Passing

- UK – Patrick Towles, 19–37, 158 yards, 1 TD, 1 INT
- MIZZ – Maty Mauk, 18–33, 164 yards, 2 TD

Rushing

- UK – Mikel Horton, 10 carries, 62 yards
- MIZZ – Maty Mauk, 14 carries, 75 yards

Receiving

- UK – S. Williams, 5 receptions, 58 yards
- MIZZ – Bud Sasser, 6 receptions, 67 yards

Tackling

- UK – Josh Forrest, 10 tackles
- MIZZ – Kentrell Brothers, 13 tackles

=== Texas A&M ===
Missouri Tigers at No.24 Texas A&M Aggies – Game summary

Quarter	1	2	3	4	Total
Missouri	3	3	28	0	34
No.24 Texas A&M	3	10	7	7	27

at Kyle Field • College Station, Texas

- Date: November 15, 2014
- Game time: 6:30 p.m. CDT
- Game weather: Temperature: 48 °F (9 °C) • Wind: 7 mph (11 km/h) E • Weather: Light rain
- Game attendance: 104,756
- Referee: Hubert Owens
- TV announcers (SECN): Brent Musburger, Jesse Palmer, and Maria Taylor

Game information

First Quarter

- 8:53 Missouri (3-0) - 38 yard kick by Andrew Baggett
- 7:18 Texas A&M (3-3) - 40 yard kick by Josh Lambo

Second Quarter

- 9:40 Texas A&M (3-10) - Josh Reynolds 24 yard pass from Kyle Allen (Josh Lambo kick)
- 4:30 Missouri (6-10) - 35 yard kick by Andrew Baggett
- 0:00 Texas A&M (6-13) - 31 yard kick by Josh Lambo

Third Quarter

- 11:47 Missouri (13-13) - Darius White 16 yard pass from Maty Mauk (Andrew Baggett kick)
- 10:46 Texas A&M (13-20) - Josh Reynolds 56 yard pass from Kyle Allen (Josh Lambo kick)
- 9:07 Missouri (20-20) - Russell Hansbrough 49 yard run (Andrew Baggett kick)
- 5:41 Missouri (27-20) - Russell Hansbrough 45 yard run (Andrew Baggett kick)
- 0:43 Missouri (34-20) - Ish Witter 16 yard run (Andrew Baggett kick)

Fourth Quarter

- 11:04 Texas A&M (34-27) - Malcome Kennedy 4 yard pass from Kyle Allen (Josh Lambo kick)

Passing

- MIZZ – Maty Mauk, 23–40, 252 yards, 1 TD, 1 INT
- TAM – Kyle Allen, 24–35, 237 yards, 3 TD, 1 INT

Rushing

- MIZZ – Russell Hansbrough, 20 carries, 199 yards, 2 TD
- TAM – Tra Carson, 10 carries, 56 yards

Receiving

- MIZZ – Jimmie Hunt, 5 receptions, 85 yards
- TAM – Josh Reynolds, 5 receptions, 125 yards, 2 TD

Tackling

- MIZZ – Kendrell Brothers, 11 tackles
- TAM – S. Washington, 10 tackles, 1 breakup

=== Tennessee ===
No.19 Missouri Tigers at Tennessee Volunteers – Game summary

Quarter	1	2	3	4	Total
No.19 Missouri	7	6	3	13	29
Tennessee	3	10	0	8	21

at Neyland Stadium • Knoxville, Tennessee

- Date: November 22, 2014
- Game time: 6:30 p.m. CDT
- Game weather: Temperature: 47 °F (8 °C) • Wind: 5 mph (8.0 km/h) SSW • Weather: Clear
- Game attendance: 95,821
- Referee: Matt Austin
- TV announcers (ESPN): Chris Fowler (play-by-play), Kirk Herbstreit (color commentator), and Heather Cox (sideline reporter)

Game information

First Quarter

- 10:23 Missouri (7-0) - Marcus Murphy run for 1 yd for a TD, (Andrew Baggett kick)
- 3:41 Tennessee (7-3) - 38 yard kick by Aaron Medley

Second Quarter

- 11:14 Tennessee (7-10) - Patrick Ashford pass complete to Alex Ellis for 31 yds for a TD, (Aaron Medley kick)
- 7:50 Missouri (13-10) - Marcus Murphy run for 7 yds for a TD, (Andrew Baggett PAT failed)
- 3:49 Tennessee (13-13) - 39 yard kick by Aaron Medley

Third Quarter

- 7:40 Missouri (16-13) - 43 yard kick by Andrew Baggett

Fourth Quarter

- 10:42 Missouri (23-13) - Maty Mauk pass complete to Jimmie Hunt for 73 yds for a TD, (Andrew Baggett kick)
- 6:22 Missouri (29-13) - Maty Mauk pass complete to Bud Sasser for 13 yds for a TD, (Andrew Baggett PAT failed)
- 1:52 Tennessee (29-21) - Joshua Dobbs pass complete to Jason Croom for 4 yds for a TD, (2-point conv)

Passing

- MIZZ – Maty Mauk, 12–25, 230 yards, 2 TD
- TENN – Joshua Dobbs, 24–37, 195 yards, 1 TD, 1 INT

Rushing

- MIZZ – Marcus Murphy, 19 carries, 82 yards, 2 TD
- TENN – Jalen Hurd, 11 carries, 40 yards

Receiving

- MIZZ – Jimmie Hunt, 3 receptions, 106 yards, 1 TD
- TENN – Pig Howard, 8 receptions, 90 yards

Tackling

- MIZZ – Kendrell Brothers, 7 tackles
- TENN – L. McNeil, 11 tackles, 1 breakup

=== Arkansas ===
Arkansas Razorbacks at No.17 Missouri Tigers – Game summary

Quarter	1	2	3	4	Total
Arkansas	7	7	0	0	14
No.17 Missouri	0	6	0	15	21

at Faurot Field • Columbia, Missouri

- Date: November 28, 2014
- Game time: 1:30 p.m.
- Game weather: Temperature: 53 °F (12 °C) • Wind: 13 mph (21 km/h) SSW • Weather: Sunny
- Game attendance: 71,168
- Referee: David Smith
- TV announcers (CBS): Carter Blackburn, Aaron Taylor, and Jamie Erdahl

Game information

First Quarter

- 6:48 Arkansas (0-7) - Jonathan Williams 23 Yd pass from Brandon Allen (Adam McFain kick)

Second Quarter

- 14:23 Missouri (3-7) - 52 yard kick by Andrew Baggett
- 7:15 Arkansas (3-14) - Keon Hatcher 12 Yd pass from Brandon Allen (Adam McFain kick)
- 0:00 Missouri (6-14) - 50 yard kick by Andrew Baggett

Third Quarter

- No Scoring

Fourth Quarter

- 12:41 Missouri (14-14) - Jimmie Hunt 4 Yd pass from Maty Mauk (2-point conv)
- 4:38 Missouri (21-14) - Marcus Murphy 12 Yd Run (Andrew Baggett kick)

Passing

- ARK – Brandon Allen, 13–30, 133 yards, 2 TD
- MIZZ – Maty Mauk, 25–42, 265 yards, 1 TD, 1 INT

Rushing

- ARK – Jonathan Williams, 13 carries, 72 yards
- MIZZ – Russell Hansbrough, 20 carries, 91 yards

Receiving

- ARK – Hunter Henry, 4 receptions, 48 yards
- MIZZ – Bud Sasser, 9 receptions, 127 yards

Tackling

- ARK – M. Spaight, 15 tackles
- MIZZ – Kendrell Brothers, 11 tackles

=== Alabama ===
2014 SEC Championship Game
No.1 Alabama Crimson Tide vs No.14 Missouri Tigers – Game summary

Quarter	1	2	3	4	Total
No.1 Alabama	7	14	0	21	42
No.14 Missouri	0	3	10	0	13

at Georgia Dome • Atlanta, Georgia

- Date: December 6, 2014
- Game time: 3:00 p.m.
- Game weather: Indoors
- Game attendance: 73,526
- Referee: Tom Ritter
- TV announcers (CBS): Verne Lundquist (play-by-play), Gary Danielson (color), and Allie LaForce (sideline)

Game information

First Quarter

- 11:24 Alabama (7-0) - T.J. Yeldon 1 yard run (Adam Griffith kick)

Second Quarter

- 11:48 Alabama (14-0) - T.J. Yeldon 1 yard run (Adam Griffith kick)
- 8:30 Missouri (14-3) - 33 yard kick by Andrew Baggett
- 2:47 Alabama (21-3) - T.J. Yeldon 2 yard run (Adam Griffith kick)

Third Quarter

- 11:00 Missouri (21-10) - Bud Sasser 1 yard pass from Maty Mauk (Andrew Baggett kick)
- 4:37 Missouri (21-13) - Markus Golden 21 yard fumble recovery (Andrew Baggett kick)

Fourth Quarter

- 14:55 Alabama (28-13) - Christion Jones 6 yard pass from Blake Sims (Adam Griffith kick)
- 7:38 Alabama (35-13) - Derrick Henry 26 yard run (Adam Griffith kick)
- 3:38 Alabama (42-13) - Derrick Henry 1 yard run (Adam Griffith kick)

Passing

- BAMA – Blake Sims 23/27, 262 yards, 2 TD
- MIZZ – Maty Mauk 16/34, 272 yards, 1 TD

Rushing

- BAMA – Derrick Henry 20 carries, 141 yards, 2 TD
- MIZZ – Russell Hansbrough 13 carries, 21 yards

Receiving

- BAMA – DeAndrew White 4 receptions, 101 yards, 1 TD
- MIZZ – Jimmie Hunt 6 receptions, 169 yards

Tackling

- BAMA – A'Shawn Robinson 9 tackles, 3 TFL
- MIZZ – Kentrell Brothers 14 tackles

=== Minnesota (Citrus Bowl) ===
Buffalo Wild Wings Citrus Bowl
No.25 Minnesota Golden Gophers vs No.16 Missouri Tigers – Game summary

Quarter	1	2	3	4	Total
No.16 Missouri	0	10	9	14	33
No.25 Minnesota	7	0	10	0	17

at Orlando Citrus Bowl Stadium • Orlando, Florida

- Date: January 1, 2015
- Game time: 12:00 p.m.
- Game weather: Temperature: 72 °F (22 °C) • Wind: 6 mph (9.7 km/h) NE • Weather: Partly Cloudy
- Game attendance: 48,624
- Referee: Alan Eck
- TV announcers (ABC/ESPN Radio): Mike Patrick, Ed Cunningham, and Jeannine Edwards/Dave LaMont, Tom Ramsey, and Kayce Smith (sideline)

Game information

First Quarter

- 6:38 Minnesota (7-0) - Rodrick Williams Jr. 20 yard run (Ryan Santoso kick)

Second Quarter

- 7:10 Missouri (7-3) - 21 yard kick by Andrew Baggett
- 1:50 Missouri (7-10) - Bud Sasser 25 yard pass from Maty Mauk (Andrew Baggett kick)

Third Quarter

- 14:00 Missouri (7-13) - 33 yard kick by Andrew Baggett
- 12:40 Minnesota (14-13) - Maxx Williams 54 yard pass from Mitch Leidner (Ryan Santoso kick)
- 10:00 Missouri (14-19) – Maty Mauk 18 yard run (2 point conv failed)
- 7:30 Minnesota (17-19) - 37 yard kick by Ryan Santoso

Fourth Quarter

- 10:30 Missouri (17-26) - Russell Hansbrough 78 yard run (Andrew Baggett kick)
- 5:50 Missouri (17-33) - Bud Sasser 7 yard pass from Maty Mauk (Andrew Baggett kick)

Passing

- MINN – Mitch Leidner 21/31, 258 yards, 1 TD
- MIZZ – Maty Mauk 12/19, 97 yards, 2 TD, 2 INT

Rushing

- MINN – David Cobb 21 carries, 81 yards
- MIZZ – Marcus Murphy 12 carries, 157 yards

Receiving

- MINN – Maxx Williams 7 receptions, 98 yards, 1 TD
- MIZZ – Bud Sasser 7 receptions, 68 yards, 2 TD

Tackling

- MINN – Damien Wilson, 8 tackles
- MIZZ – Ian Simon, 10 tackles, 1 breakup

== Coaching staff ==
Name	Position	Years at MU	Alma mater (year)
Gary Pinkel	Head coach	14	Kent State (1975)
Dave Steckel	Assistant head coach Defensive coordinator Linebackers coach	14	Kutztown (1982)
Andy Hill	Quarterbacks Coach; Associate head coach	19	University of Missouri (1985)
Josh Henson	Offensive coordinator Co-offensive line coach Tight ends	6	Oklahoma State (1998)
Alex Grinch	Secondary and Safeties Coach	6	Mount Union (2002)
Cornell Ford	Cornerbacks coach	14	Toledo (1991)
Pat Washington	Receivers Coach	2	Auburn (1987)
Brian Jones	Running backs coach	14	Connecticut (1981)
Craig Kuligowski	Defensive line coach	14	Toledo (1991)
A. J. Ricker	Co-offensive line coach	1	University of Missouri (2004)
Dan Hopkins	Director of football operations	8	University of Missouri (2004)
Nick Otterbacher	Director of Football Recruiting	11	Toledo (2002)

Source: 2014 Mizzou Football Roster (coaches)

== Rankings ==
Ranking movements Legend: ██ Increase in ranking ██ Decrease in ranking — = Not ranked RV = Received votes
	Week																
Poll	Pre	1	2	3	4	5	6	7	8	9	10	11	12	13	14	15	Final
AP	24	24	20	18	RV	24	23	—	RV	RV	RV	RV	19	17	14	16	14
Coaches	RV	22	22	19	RV	RV	24	RV	RV	RV	RV	RV	20	17	13	14	11
CFP	Not released									—	—	RV	20	17	16	16	Not released
