= Josh Henson =

American football coach (born 1975)

Current position
- Title: Offensive coordinator, tight ends coach
- Team: Purdue
- Conference: Big Ten
- Annual salary: 1.1 million

Biographical details
- Born: July 14, 1975 (age 51); Tuttle, Oklahoma, U.S.

Playing career
- 1993–1997: Oklahoma State
- Position: Offensive lineman

Coaching career (HC unless noted)
- 1998: Kingfisher HS (OK) (assistant)
- 1999–2004: Oklahoma State (TE)
- 2005–2008: LSU (TE)
- 2009–2015: Missouri (OC/OL)
- 2016–2018: Oklahoma State (OL)
- 2019–2021: Texas A&M (OL)
- 2022–2024: USC (OC/OL)
- 2025–present: Purdue (OC/TE)

Accomplishments and honors

Awards
- National champion (2007); Second-team All-Big 12 (1997)

Joshua Aaron Henson (born July 14, 1975) is an American football coach and former offensive lineman who is the current offensive coordinator and tight ends coach for the Purdue Boilermakers. Henson was previously the offensive coordinator for the Missouri Tigers (2013–2015) and the USC Trojans (2022–2024). Henson played college football at Oklahoma State from 1993 to 1997.

Henson was born in Tuttle, Oklahoma. He attended Tuttle High School where he excelled at football and track & field. After graduation from high school, Henson enrolled at Oklahoma State University where he walked-on as a linebacker. He transitioned to an offensive lineman, where he started for the Cowboys, starting for four seasons. As a fifth-year senior in 1997, he led Oklahoma State to the 1997 Alamo Bowl and was a Second-team All-Big 12 Conference player.

== Early life and education ==
Born on July 14, 1975, in Tuttle, Oklahoma. As a senior at Tuttle High School, Henson was named All-State by the OCA as a defensive end. Henson enrolled Oklahoma State University and walked-on to the Oklahoma State Cowboys football team, where he was listed as a linebacker as a true freshman. In the summer, Henson transferred to Northeastern State, where he was listed a defensive end. With some of the Oklahoma State recruiting not qualifying academically, Henson was recruited back to Oklahoma State, where he was listed as the starting offensive guard. While at Oklahoma State, Henson started 37 games at offensive line and was named All-Big 12. Henson graduated from Oklahoma State with a bachelor's degree in secondary education.

== Coaching career ==
After graduating from Oklahoma State, Henson had a one-year stint as an assistant to the Kingfisher High School football team, where he helped the team reach the state semifinals. The next year, Henson became a graduate assistant for Oklahoma State but later he became the tight ends coach at Oklahoma State for the next four years. When Oklahoma State head coach, Les Miles left to become the head coach at LSU, he brought Henson with him to coach tight ends. After another four years, Henson left LSU to become the co-offensive line coach and later the offensive coordinator for Missouri. After not being retained as offensive coordinator by the new head coach, Barry Odom, Henson returned to Oklahoma State to become the offensive line coach. Three years after, Henson left to become the offensive line coach for Texas A&M. In 2022, Henson once again got the opportunity to be an offensive coordinator, becoming USC's offensive coordinator under new coach Lincoln Riley. Henson's role with USC included not making any play calls, but bringing suggestions to head coach Riley. In December 2024, Henson was named the offensive coordinator of the Purdue Boilermakers.
