= Mike Bobinski =

American college athletics administrator

Current position
- Title: Athletic director
- Team: Purdue
- Conference: Big Ten

Biographical details
- Born: October 28, 1957 (age 69); Long Island, New York, U.S.

Playing career
- 1976–1979: Notre Dame
- Position: Pitcher

Administrative career (AD unless noted)
- 1989–1994: Navy (associate AD)
- 1994–1998: Akron
- 1998–2013: Xavier
- 2013–2016: Georgia Tech
- 2016–2026: Purdue

Michael Bobinski (born October 28, 1957) is the former Director of Athletics at Purdue University. Bobinski was named as the new athletic director for Purdue on August 9, 2016. Prior to that, Bobinski was the athletic director at Georgia Tech, Xavier University and University of Akron. He also held positions in the athletic department at the U.S. Naval Academy and the University of Notre Dame. Bobinski received his bachelor of business administration from Notre Dame, graduating magna cum laude, while playing for the Fighting Irish baseball team. He has been recognized nationally as the NACDA Division I Northeast AD of the year (2012) as well as the Chair of the Division I Men's Basketball Committee. On June 3, 2026 he announced he would retire as Purdue AD at the end of the year.

== Early life ==
Bobinski attended Longwood High School where he was a standout baseball player named All-league, All-county and was the Longwood MVP his senior season.
