= Ada Independent School District =

School district in Oklahoma, U.S.

Coordinates: 34.760590°N 96.659745°W

Location
- Ada, Oklahoma United States

District information
- Type: Public
- Grades: 10th - 12th

Students and staff
- Students: 2,704
- District mascot: Cougar

Other information
- Website: www.adacougars.net

Ada High School

Location
- 1400 South Stadium Drive; Ada, (Pontotoc County), Oklahoma 74820; United States

Information
- Type: Public high school
- Principal: Eddie Jacobs
- Staff: 46.63 (FTE)
- Enrollment: 546 (2023-24)
- Student to teacher ratio: 11.71
- Colors: Maroon and white
- Nickname: Cougars
- Website: Ada High School

The Ada Independent School District is a school district based in Ada, Oklahoma, United States. It includes seven schools and serves more than 2,600 students.

The district has a jagged eastern border that stretches as far N3930 Road. Its western boundary is west of U.S. Route 377 in the north and S. Oak Avenue in the south.

== List of schools ==
=== Pre-K ===
- Glenwood Early Childhood Center, houses six educational programs geared toward early childhood (4–5 years old)

=== Elementary schools ===
- Hayes Grade Center, 1st and 2nd grade
- Washington Grade Center, 3rd and 4th grade

=== Middle schools ===
- Willard Grade Center, 5th and 6th grade
- Ada Junior High School, 7th through 9th grade

=== High schools ===
- Ada High School, 10th through 12th grade
- STEPS: Alternative Education Academy

== Extracurricular ==
The high school is home to the Ada Cougars, who have won 19 state football championships (1951-2, 1955–7, 1959, 1962, 1964–5, 1970, 1974, 1980, 1986, 1988, 1991, and 1993–6) - the most in Oklahoma. Ada High School is also the home of Cougar News Network, a high school news program, which appears on Public-access television. Among the many outstanding extracurricular activities and sports programs available to students is the award-winning Ada High School Cougar Marching Band.

== See also ==
- List of school districts in Oklahoma
