= SEC Network Football =

- Starring: Tom Hart; Jordan Rodgers; Cole Cubelic; Taylor Zarzour; Andre Ware; Olivia Harlan; Dave Neal; Matt Stinchcomb; Dawn Davenport
- Country of origin: United States

Production
- Running time: 3 hours (approximate)

Original release
- Network: SEC Network
- Release: 2014 – present

SEC Network Football is a live game presentation of SEC football on the SEC Network. These telecasts have many different presenting sponsors, but some include Dr. Pepper, Allstate, and Regions Bank. There are typically 3 telecasts every Saturday during the college football regular season, though beginning in 2015, the SEC Network Alternate channel gets one game, usually during the 4:00 PM time slot. The Noon game is preceded by SEC Nation and succeeded by SEC Now which will also serve as a pregame and postgame show for the 4:00 game. The 7:30 game will be succeeded by SEC Scoreboard.

== History ==
The SEC had won seven straight college football national championships when the SEC Network was announced in May 2013. On March 12, 2014, the SEC Network named Brent Musburger as the lead play-by-play announcer and Jesse Palmer as the lead analyst. It was later announced that Maria Taylor would join them as the sideline reporter. In July 2014, the SEC Network named the rest of their football announcers. Tom Hart would be a play-by-play announcer, paired up with Matt Stinchcomb as the analyst, and Heather Mitts as the sideline reporter. Also, Dave Neal would do play-by-play announcing with Andre Ware as the analyst, both moving from SEC TV. They would be joined by Laura Rutledge as the sideline reporter. The first football game broadcast on the SEC Network was on Thursday, August 28, 2014, when Texas A&M defeated South Carolina 52-28. CBS gets the exclusive first pick of the day's SEC games before ESPN and SEC Network can choose.

== Personalities ==
=== Current ===
- Tom Hart: (play-by-play, 2014–present)
- Taylor Zarzour: (play-by-play, 2017–present)
- Dave Neal: (play-by-play, 2014–present)
- Jordan Rodgers: (analyst, 2017–present)
- Andre Ware: (analyst, 2014–present)
- Matt Stinchcomb: (analyst, 2014–present)
- Cole Cubelic: (sideline reporter, 2016–present)
- Olivia Harlan: (sideline reporter, 2016–present)
- Dawn Davenport: (sideline reporter, 2017–present)

=== Former ===
- Brent Musburger: (play-by-play, 2014–2016)
- Jesse Palmer: (analyst, 2014–2016)
- Maria Taylor: (sideline reporter, 2014–2015)
- Laura Rutledge: (sideline reporter, 2014–2015)
- Kaylee Hartung: (sideline reporter, 2016)
- Heather Mitts: (sideline reporter, 2014)
- Kayce Smith: (sideline reporter, 2015)

== Game features ==
- Starting Lineups: The starting lineups for both teams' offense and defense.
- SEC Right Now: A studio update where the host updates the viewers on an important game for the SEC that week.
- Halftime Report: The halftime report is presented by Auto-Owners Insurance and is shown at halftime of every game.
- Studio Update: A studio update where the host informs the viewers of a non-SEC game.

== Schedule ==
=== 2014 ===
- August 28:
  - #21 Texas A&M 52 at #9 South Carolina 28 (6:00 pm ET)
  - Temple 37 at Vanderbilt 7 (10:50 pm ET)
- August 30:
  - UT Martin 14 at Kentucky 59 (12:00 Noon ET)
  - Arkansas 21 at #6 Auburn 45 (4:00 pm ET)
  - Southern Miss 0 at Mississippi State 49 (7:30 pm ET)
- August 31:
  - Utah State 7 at Tennessee 38 (7:00 pm ET)
- September 6:
  - Florida Atlantic 0 at #2 Alabama 41 (12:00 Noon ET)
  - Arkansas State 19 at Tennessee 34 (SEC Network Alternate–12:00 Noon ET)
  - Eastern Michigan 0 at Florida 65 (4:00 pm ET)
  - Nicholls State 7 at Arkansas 73 (SEC Network Alternare–4:00 pm ET)
  - Sam Houston State 0 at #12 LSU 56 (7:30 pm ET)
  - Lamar 3 at #9 Texas A&M 73 (SEC Network Alternate–7:30 pm ET)
- September 13:
  - Central Florida 10 at #20 Missouri 38 (12:00 Noon ET)
  - Louisiana-Lafayette 15 at #14 Ole Miss 56 (4:00 pm ET)
  - Kentucky 30 at Florida 36 (7:30 pm ET)
- September 20:
  - Troy 0 at #13 Georgia 66 (12:00 Noon ET)
  - Indiana 31 at #18 Missouri 27 (4:00 pm ET)
  - #14 South Carolina 48 at Vanderbilt 34 (7:30 pm ET)
- September 27
  - Vanderbilt 7 at Kentucky 17 (12:00 Noon ET)
  - Louisiana Tech 10 at #5 Auburn 45 (4:00 pm ET)
  - New Mexico State 7 at #17 LSU 63 (7:30 pm ET)
- October 4
  - Florida 10 at Tennessee 9 (12:00 Noon ET)
  - Vanderbilt 17 at #13 Georgia 44 (4:00 pm ET)
  - South Carolina 38 at Kentucky 45 (7:30 pm ET)
- October 11
  - Louisiana–Monroe 14 at Kentucky 48 (12:00 Noon ET)
  - Chattanooga 10 at Tennessee 45 (4:00 pm ET)
  - LSU 30 at Florida 27 (7:30 pm ET)
- October 18
  - Furman 10 at South Carolina 41 (12:00 Noon ET)
  - Arkansas 32 at #10 Georgia 45 (4:00 pm ET)
  - Kentucky 3 at LSU 41 (7:30 pm ET)
- October 25
  - UAB 17 at Arkansas 45 (12:00 Noon ET)
  - Vanderbilt 14 at Missouri 24 (4:00 pm ET)
  - South Carolina 35 at #5 Auburn 42 (7:30 pm ET)
- November 1
  - Louisiana–Monroe 16 at Texas A&M 21 (12:00 Noon ET)
  - Kentucky 27 at #24 Missouri 34 (4:00 pm ET)
  - Tennessee 45 at South Carolina 42 (7:30 pm ET)
- November 8
  - Presbyterian 0 at #12 Ole Miss 48 (12:00 Noon ET)
  - UT Martin 16 at #1 Mississippi State 45 (4:00 pm ET)
  - Florida 34 at Vanderbilt 10 (7:30 pm ET)
- November 15
  - South Carolina 23 at Florida 20 (12:00 Noon ET)
  - Kentucky 16 at Tennessee 50 (4:00 pm ET)
  - Missouri 34 at #24 Texas A&M 27 (7:30 pm ET)
- November 22
  - Charleston Southern 9 at #9 Georgia 55 (12:00 Noon ET)
  - Eastern Kentucky 3 at Florida 52 (SEC Network Alternate–12:00 Noon ET)
  - Western Carolina 14 at #1 Alabama 48 (4:00 pm ET)
  - Vanderbilt 0 at #4 Mississippi State 51 (7:30 pm ET)
- November 29
  - #16 Georgia Tech 30 at #9 Georgia 24 (12:00 Noon ET)
  - Tennessee 24 at Vanderbilt 17 (4:00 pm ET)

=== 2015 ===
- September 3
  - Western Kentucky 14 at Vanderbilt 12 (8:00 pm ET)
- September 5
  - Louisiana–Monroe 14 at #9 Georgia 51 (12:00 Noon ET)
  - Tennessee–Martin 3 at #17 Ole Miss 76 (SEC Network Alternate–12:00 Noon ET)
  - Bowling Green 30 vs. #25 Tennessee 59 (4:00 pm ET at Nashville, TN)
  - Southeast Missouri State 3 at #24 Missouri 34 (SEC Network Alternate–4:00 pm ET)
  - New Mexico State 13 at Florida 61 (7:30 pm ET)
  - McNeese State at #14 LSU (SEC Network Alternate–7:30 pm ET: Canceled due to weather)
- September 12
  - Jacksonville State 20 at #6 Auburn 27 (12:00 Noon ET)
  - Middle Tennessee 10 at #2 Alabama 37 (4:00 pm ET)
  - Toledo 16 at #18 Arkansas 12 (SEC Network Alternate–4:00 pm ET)
  - Kentucky 26 at South Carolina 22 (7:30 pm ET)
- September 19
  - Nevada 27 at #17 Texas A&M 44 (12:00 Noon ET)
  - Northwestern State 13 at Mississippi State 62 (4:00 pm ET)
  - Austin Peay 7 at Vanderbilt 47 (SEC Network Alternate–4:00 pm ET)
  - Florida 14 at Kentucky 9 (7:30 pm ET)
- September 26
  - Southern 6 at #7 Georgia 48 (12:00 Noon ET)
  - Louisiana–Monroe 0 at #12 Alabama 34 (4:00 pm ET)
  - #25 Missouri 13 at Kentucky 21 (7:30 pm ET)
- October 3
  - South Carolina 10 at Missouri 24 (12:00 Noon ET)
  - San Jose State 21 at Auburn 35 (4:00 pm ET)
  - #21 Mississippi State 17 at #14 Texas A&M 30 (7:30 pm ET)
  - East Kentucky 27 at Kentucky 34 (SEC Network Alternate–7:30 pm ET)
- October 10
  - New Mexico St 3 at #14 Ole Miss 52 (12:00 Noon ET)
  - Troy 17 at Mississippi State 45 (4:00 pm ET)
  - #11 Florida 21 at Missouri 3 (7:30 pm ET)
- October 17
  - LA Tech 20 at Mississippi State 45 (12:00 Noon ET)
  - Vanderbilt 10 at South Carolina 19 (4:00 pm ET)
  - Missouri 6 at Georgia 9 (7:30 pm ET)
- October 24
  - Auburn 46 at Arkansas 54 (12:00 Noon ET)
  - Missouri 3 at Vanderbilt 10 (4:00 pm ET)
  - Kentucky 16 at Mississippi State 42 (7:30 pm ET)
- October 31
  - South Carolina 28 at Texas A&M 35 (12:00 Noon ET)
  - Tennessee-Martin 28 at Arkansas 63 (4:00 pm ET)
  - Tennessee 52 at Kentucky 21 (7:30 pm ET)
- November 7
  - Kentucky 3 at Georgia 27 (12:00 Noon ET)
  - South Carolina 24 at Tennessee 27 (4:00 pm ET)
  - Auburn 26 at #19 Texas A&M 10 (7:30 pm ET)
- November 14
  - North Texas 0 at Tennessee 24 (12:00 Noon ET)
  - Kentucky 17 at Vanderbilt 21 (4:00 pm ET)
  - BYU 16 vs. Missouri 20 (7:30 pm ET)
- November 21
  - Florida Atlantic 14 at #8 Florida 20 (12:00 Noon ET)
  - The Citadel 23 at South Carolina 22 (SEC Network Alternate–12:00 Noon ET)
  - Charleston Southern 6 at #2 Alabama 56 (4:00 pm ET)
  - Idaho 34 at Auburn 56 (SEC Network Alternate–4:00 pm ET)
  - Texas A&M 25 at Vanderbilt 0 (7:30 pm ET)
  - Charlotte 10 at Kentucky 58 (SEC Network Alternate–7:30 pm ET)
- November 28
  - Louisville 38 at Kentucky 24 (12:00 Noon ET)
  - Vanderbilt 28 at Tennessee 53 (4:00 pm ET)
  - Texas A&M 7 at LSU 19 (7:30 pm ET)

=== 2016 ===
- September 1
  - Appalachian State 13 at #9 Tennessee 20 (7:30 pm ET)
- September 3
  - South Alabama 21 at Mississippi State 20 (12:00 Noon ET)
  - Louisiana Tech 20 at Arkansas 21 (4:00 pm ET)
  - UMass 7 at #25 Florida 24 (7:30 pm ET)
- September 10
  - Nicholls State 24 at #9 Georgia 26 (12:00 Noon ET)
  - Prairie View A&M 0 at #20 Texas A&M 67 (SEC Network Alternate–12:00 Noon ET)
  - Wofford 13 at #19 Ole Miss 38 (4:00 pm ET)
  - Middle Tennessee 24 at Vanderbilt 47 (SEC Network Alternate–4:00 pm ET)
  - Arkansas State 14 at Auburn 51 (7:30 pm ET)
  - Eastern Michigan 21 at Missouri 61 (SEC Network Alternate–7:30 pm ET)
- September 17
  - Ohio 19 at #15 Tennessee 28 (12:00 Noon ET)
  - East Carolina 15 at South Carolina 20 (4:00 pm ET)
  - New Mexico State 42 at Kentucky 62 (SEC Network Alternate–4:00 pm ET)
  - #16 Georgia 28 at Missouri 27 (7:30 pm ET)
  - Texas State 3 at #24 Arkansas 42 (SEC Network Alternate–7:30 pm ET)
- September 24
  - Kent State 0 at #1 Alabama 48 (12:00 Noon ET)
  - Delaware State 0 at Missouri 79 (4:00 pm ET)
  - South Carolina 10 at Kentucky 17 (7:30 pm ET)
- October 1
  - #23 Florida 13 at Vanderbilt 6 (12:00 Noon ET)
  - Alcorn State 10 at #20 Arkansas 52 (SEC Network Alternate–12:00 Noon ET)
  - Louisiana-Monroe 7 at Auburn 58 (SEC Network Alternate–3:30 pm ET)
  - #9 Texas A&M 24 at South Carolina 13 (4:00 pm ET)
  - Missouri 7 at LSU 42 (7:30 pm ET)
- October 8
  - Vanderbilt 13 at Kentucky 20 (4:00 pm ET)
- October 9
  - Georgia 28 at South Carolina 14 (2:30 pm ET)
- October 15
  - Vanderbilt 17 at Georgia 16 (12:00 Noon ET)
  - Missouri 14 at #18 Florida 40 (4:00 pm ET)
  - Southern Miss 10 at LSU 45 (7:30 pm ET)
- October 22
  - UMass 28 at South Carolina 34 (12:00 Noon ET)
  - Middle Tennessee 51 at Missouri 45 (4:00 pm ET)
  - Mississippi State 38 at Kentucky 40 (7:30 pm ET)
- October 29
  - Kentucky 35 at Missouri 21 (12:00 Noon ET)
  - Samford 41 at Mississippi State 56 (3:30 pm ET)
  - #15 Auburn 40 at Ole Miss 29 (7:15 pm ET)
- November 5
  - #4 Texas A&M 28 at Mississippi State 35 (12:00 Noon ET)
  - Missouri 21 at South Carolina 31 (4:00 pm ET)
  - Tennessee Tech 0 at Tennessee 55 (SEC Network Alternate–4:00 pm ET)
  - Georgia 27 at Kentucky 24 (7:30 pm ET)
- November 12
  - Kentucky 36 at Tennessee 49 (12:00 Noon ET)
  - Vanderbilt 17 at Missouri 26 (3:30 pm ET)
  - Ole Miss 29 at #8 Texas A&M 28 (7:30 pm ET)
- November 19
  - Louisiana-Lafayette 21 at Georgia 35 (SEC Network Alternate–12:00 Noon ET)
  - #23 Florida 16 at #16 LSU 10 (1:00 pm ET)
  - Western Carolina 31 at South Carolina 44 (SEC Network Alternate–4:00 pm ET)
  - Austin Peay 13 at Kentucky 49 (4:30 pm ET)
  - Alabama A&M 0 at #15 Auburn 55 (SEC Network Alternate–7:30 pm ET)
  - Ole Miss 17 at Vanderbilt 38 (8:00 pm ET)
- November 26
  - Georgia Tech 28 at Georgia 27 (12:00 Noon ET)
  - Mississippi State 55 at Ole Miss 20 (3:30 pm ET)
  - #17 Tennessee 34 at Vanderbilt 45 (8:00 pm ET)

=== 2017 ===
- August 31
  - Florida A&M 7 at Arkansas 49 (8:00 pm ET)
- September 2
  - Missouri State 43 at Missouri 72 (12:00 Noon ET)
  - Charleston Southern at Mississippi State (4:00 pm ET)
  - Georgia Southern at #12 Auburn (7:30 pm ET)
- September 9
  - Eastern Kentucky at Kentucky (12:00 Noon ET)
  - Tennessee-Martin at Ole Miss (SEC Network Alternate–12:00 Noon ET)
  - Indiana State at Tennessee (4:00 pm ET)
  - Alabama A&M at Vanderbilt (SEC Network Alternate–4:00 pm ET)
  - Northern Colorado at Florida (7:30 pm ET)
  - Chattanooga at LSU (SEC Network Alternate–7:30 pm ET)
- September 16
  - Louisiana-Lafayette at Texas A&M (12:00 Noon ET)
  - Purdue at Missouri (4:00 pm ET)
  - Mercer at Auburn (SEC Network Alternate–4:00 pm ET)
  - Kentucky at South Carolina (7:30 pm ET)
  - Samford at Georgia (SEC Network Alternate–7:30 pm ET)

== See also ==
- SEC on CBS
- SEC Network
- ESPN College Football
