= 2016 Florida Gators football team =

American college football season

2016 Florida Gators football

SEC Eastern Division champion Outback Bowl champion

SEC Championship Game, L 16–54 vs. Alabama

Outback Bowl, W 30–3 vs. Iowa
- Conference: Southeastern Conference
- Eastern Division

Ranking
- Coaches: No. 13
- AP: No. 14
- Record: 9–4 (6–2 SEC)
- Head coach: Jim McElwain (2nd season)
- Offensive coordinator: Doug Nussmeier (2nd season)
- Offensive scheme: Multiple
- Defensive coordinator: Geoff Collins (2nd season)
- Co-defensive coordinator: Randy Shannon (2nd season)
- Base defense: 4–3
- Home stadium: Ben Hill Griffin Stadium

2016 Southeastern Conference football standings
	Conf.			Overall
Team	W		L	W		L
Eastern Division
No. 14 Florida x	6	–	2	9	–	4
No. 22 Tennessee	4	–	4	9	–	4
Georgia	4	–	4	8	–	5
Kentucky	4	–	4	7	–	6
South Carolina	3	–	5	6	–	7
Vanderbilt	3	–	5	6	–	7
Missouri*	2	–	6	4	–	8
Western Division
No. 2 Alabama x$^	8	–	0	14	–	1
No. 24 Auburn	5	–	3	8	–	5
No. 13 LSU	5	–	3	8	–	4
Texas A&M	4	–	4	8	–	5
Arkansas	3	–	5	7	–	6
Mississippi State	3	–	5	6	–	7
Ole Miss*	2	–	6	5	–	7
Championship: Alabama 54, Florida 16
^ – College Football Playoff participant; $ – Conference champion; x – Division champion/co-champions; * Ole Miss and Missouri vacated all wins due to NCAA violations.; Rankings from AP Poll

The 2016 Florida Gators football team represented the University of Florida in the sport of American football during the 2016 NCAA Division I FBS football season. The Gators played their home games at Ben Hill Griffin Stadium in Gainesville, Florida, and competed in the Eastern Division of the Southeastern Conference (SEC). They were led by second-year head coach Jim McElwain. They finished the season 9–4, 6–2 in SEC regular season play to represent the Eastern Division in the SEC Championship Game where they lost to Alabama. They were invited to the Outback Bowl where they defeated Iowa.

== Schedule ==
Florida announced its 2016 football schedule on October 29, 2015. The 2016 schedule consisted of seven home, four away, and one neutral site games in the regular season. The Gators were to host SEC foes Kentucky, LSU, Missouri, and South Carolina, and travel to Arkansas, Tennessee, and Vanderbilt. Florida played Georgia in Jacksonville, Florida.

The Gators traveled to Arkansas for the first time since 2008. The team hosted two of its three non–conference games, including Massachusetts and North Texas from Conference USA. They were set to play Presbyterian, from the Big South Conference, but the game was canceled to make room for the makeup game against LSU. Florida traveled to Tallahassee for their final regular season game to play in–state rival Florida State from the Atlantic Coast Conference.

Date	Time	Opponent	Rank	Site	TV	Result	Attendance
September 3	7:30 p.m.	UMass*	No. 25	Ben Hill Griffin Stadium; Gainesville, FL	SECN	W 24–7	88,121
September 10	3:30 p.m.	Kentucky		Ben Hill Griffin Stadium; Gainesville, FL (rivalry)	CBS	W 45–7	85,821
September 17	7:30 p.m.	North Texas*	No. 23	Ben Hill Griffin Stadium; Gainesville, FL	ESPNU	W 32–0	86,848
September 24	3:30 p.m.	at No. 14 Tennessee	No. 19	Neyland Stadium; Knoxville, TN (rivalry) (College GameDay)	CBS	L 28–38	102,455
October 1	12:00 p.m.	at Vanderbilt	No. 23	Vanderbilt Stadium; Nashville, TN	SECN	W 13–6	30,565
October 15	4:00 p.m.	Missouri^{†}	No. 18	Ben Hill Griffin Stadium; Gainesville, FL	SECN	W 40–14	88,825
October 29	3:30 p.m.	vs. Georgia	No. 14	EverBank Field; Jacksonville, FL (rivalry / SEC Nation)	CBS	W 24–10	84,681
November 5	3:30 p.m.	at Arkansas	No. 10	D.W.R. Razorback Stadium; Fayetteville, AR (SEC Nation)	CBS	L 10–31	74,432
November 12	12:00 p.m.	South Carolina	No. 22	Ben Hill Griffin Stadium; Gainesville, FL (SEC Nation)	CBS	W 20–7	89,614
November 19^{[a]}	1:00 p.m.	at No. 16 LSU	No. 21	Tiger Stadium; Baton Rouge, LA (rivalry / SEC Nation)	SECN	W 16–10	102,043
November 26	8:00 p.m.	at No. 15 Florida State*	No. 13	Doak Campbell Stadium; Tallahassee, FL (rivalry)	ABC	L 13–31	78,342
December 3	4:00 p.m.	vs. No. 1 Alabama	No. 15	Georgia Dome; Atlanta, GA (SEC Championship Game / rivalry / SEC Nation)	CBS	L 16–54	74,632
January 2, 2017	1:00 p.m.	vs. No. 21 Iowa*	No. 20	Raymond James Stadium; Tampa, FL (Outback Bowl)	ABC	W 30–3	51,119
*Non-conference game; ^{†}Homecoming; Rankings from AP Poll released prior to game; All times are in Eastern time

^{^[a]}The game between Florida and LSU was postponed in advance of the arrival of Hurricane Matthew. It was originally scheduled for October 8 at Florida Field in Gainesville but was moved to November 19 at Tiger Stadium in Baton Rouge, replacing the previously scheduled game against Presbyterian.

Schedule source:

== Rankings ==
Ranking movements Legend: ██ Increase in ranking ██ Decrease in ranking — = Not ranked RV = Received votes
	Week															
Poll	Pre	1	2	3	4	5	6	7	8	9	10	11	12	13	14	Final
AP	25	RV	23	19	23	18	18	15	14	10	22	21	13	15	20	14
Coaches	25	25	23	16	21	18	14	12	12	9	16	18	13	16	18	13
CFP	Not released									11	—	23	15	15	17	Not released

== Game summaries ==
=== UMass ===
UMass Minutemen at Florida Gators – Game summary

Quarter	1	2	3	4	Total
UMass	0	7	0	0	7
No. 25 Florida	7	3	0	14	24

at Ben Hill Griffin Stadium • Gainesville, Florida

- Date: September 3, 2016
- Game time: 7:40 p.m. EDT
- Game weather: Temperature: 79 °F (26 °C) • Wind: SW at 8 miles per hour (13 km/h) • Weather: Light rain, 87% humidity
- Game attendance: 88,121
- Referee: James Carter
- TV announcers (SEC Network): Tom Hart and Andre Ware
- Boxscore

Game information

First Quarter

- Florida – Antonio Callaway 12-yard pass from Luke Del Rio (Eddy Piñeiro kick), 3:57

Second Quarter

- UMass – Ross Comis 5-yard run (Mike Caggiano kick), 14:18
- Florida – Eddy Piñeiro 40-yard field goal, 0:08

Fourth Quarter

- Florida – Eddy Piñeiro 49-yard field goal, 11:14
- Florida – Brandon Powell 26-yard pass from Luke Del Rio (Luke Del Rio pass to Freddie Swain), 8:04
- Florida – Eddy Piñeiro 48-yard field goal, 2:26

Passing leaders

- MASS – Ross Comis – 9/17, 141 yards
- FLA – Luke Del Rio – 29/44, 256 yards, 2 touchdowns

Rushing leaders

- MASS – Marquis Young – 19 carries, 59 yards
- FLA – Jordan Scarlett – 13 carries, 70 yards

Receiving leaders

- MASS – Andy Isabella – 3 receptions, 95 yards
- FLA – Brandon Powell – 7 receptions, 73 yards, 1 touchdown

Tackling leaders

- MASS – Tedrick Lowery – 11 tackles
- FLA – Jarrad Davis – 9 tackles

Overall record	Previous meeting	Previous winner
First meeting

Uniform Combination
Helmet	Jersey	Pants

The 2016 season kicked off with a prime time game against the UMass Minutemen, and was the first contest ever between the two schools. Before the game, the Gators conducted a ceremony to honor Steve Spurrier, Florida's winningest football coach, by renaming the playing surface to Steve Spurrier–Florida Field.

=== Kentucky ===
Kentucky Wildcats at Florida Gators – Game summary

Quarter	1	2	3	4	Total
Kentucky	0	0	0	7	7
Florida	14	10	14	7	45

at Ben Hill Griffin Stadium • Gainesville, Florida

- Date: September 10, 2016
- Game time: 3:39 p.m. EDT
- Game weather: Temperature: 91 °F (33 °C) • Wind: NE at 6 miles per hour (9.7 km/h) • Weather: Cloudy, 50% humidity
- Game attendance: 85,821
- Referee: Matt Austin
- TV announcers (CBS): Verne Lundquist and Gary Danielson
- Boxscore

Game information

First Quarter

- Florida – Mark Thompson 3-yard run (Eddy Piñeiro kick), 2:34
- Florida – Antonio Callaway 78-yard pass from Luke Del Rio (Eddy Piñeiro kick), 0:37

Second Quarter

- Florida – Eddy Piñeiro 54-yard field goal, 5:57
- Florida – Brandon Powell 5-yard pass from Luke Del Rio (Eddy Piñeiro kick), 0:18

Third Quarter

- Florida – Freddie Swain 26-yard pass from Luke Del Rio (Eddy Piñeiro kick), 12:25
- Florida – Jordan Scarlett 4-yard run (Eddy Piñeiro kick), 3:40

Fourth Quarter

- Florida – La'Mical Perine 28-yard pass from Luke Del Rio (Eddy Piñeiro kick), 14:19
- Kentucky – Jojo Kemp 2-yard run (Austin MacGinnis kick), 4:27

Passing leaders

- KEN – Stephen Johnson – 1/3, 45 yards
- FLA – Luke Del Rio – 19/32, 320 yards, 4 touchdowns, 1 interception

Rushing leaders

- KEN – Stanley Williams – 12 carries, 66 yards
- FLA – La'Mical Perine – 17 carries, 105 yards

Receiving leaders

- KEN – Jeff Badet – 1 reception, 45 yards
- FLA – Antonio Callaway – 5 receptions, 129 yards, 1 touchdown

Tackling leaders

- KEN – Jordan Jones and Blake McClain – 9 tackles
- FLA – Alex Anzalone – 6 tackles

Overall record	Previous meeting	Previous winner
49–17	September 19, 2015	Florida, 14–9

Uniform Combination
Helmet	Jersey	Pants

Florida's last loss to Kentucky came in 1986. Since then, Florida has defeated the Wildcats 29 years in a row, the longest active winning streak over an annual opponent. The all-time record is Notre Dame's 43-game winning streak against Navy from 1964 to 2006. Last year's game at Commonwealth Stadium was closely contested. Florida did lead 14–3 at halftime, although Kentucky was able to narrow the Gators' lead to 5 with two fourth quarter field goals before time expired.

=== North Texas ===
North Texas Mean Green at Florida Gators – Game summary

Quarter	1	2	3	4	Total
North Texas	0	0	0	0	0
No. 23 Florida	5	14	0	13	32

at Ben Hill Griffin Stadium • Gainesville, Florida

- Date: September 17, 2016
- Game time: 7:32 p.m. EDT
- Game weather: Temperature: 83 °F (28 °C) • Wind: E at 5 miles per hour (8.0 km/h) • Weather: Cloudy, 73% humidity
- Game attendance: 86,848
- Referee: David Smith
- TV announcers (ESPNU): Clay Matvick and Dusty Dvoracek
- Boxscore

Game information

First Quarter

- Florida – Team safety, 13:04
- Florida – Eddy Piñeiro 22-yard field goal, 8:49

Second Quarter

- Florida – Jordan Cronkrite 6-yard run (Eddy Piñeiro kick), 12:32
- Florida – La'Mical Perine 2-yard run (Eddy Piñeiro kick), 3:00

Fourth Quarter

- Florida – Mark Thompson 20-yard run, 13:46
- Florida – Jordan Scarlett 1 yard run (Eddy Piñeiro kick), 7:15

Passing leaders

- NT – Mason Fine – 6/22, 66 yards, 1 interception
- FLA – Luke Del Rio – 14/25, 186 yards, 1 interception

Rushing leaders

- NT – Jeff Wilson – 10 carries, 26 yards
- FLA – Mark Thompson – 11 carries, 85 yards, 1 touchdown

Receiving leaders

- NT – Thaddeous Thompson – 3 receptions, 50 yards
- FLA – Josh Hammond – 2 receptions, 72 yards

Tackling leaders

- NT – Nate Brooks – 8 tackles
- FLA – Jarrad Davis and Marcus Maye – 6 tackles

Overall record	Previous meeting	Previous winner
0–1	October 4, 1947	North Texas State, 20–12

Uniform Combination
Helmet	Jersey	Pants

This was the second meeting between the two schools, with North Texas having won the only prior game, 20–12, in 1947.

=== Tennessee ===
Florida Gators at Tennessee Volunteers – Game summary

Quarter	1	2	3	4	Total
No. 19 Florida	7	14	0	7	28
No. 14 Tennessee	0	3	14	21	38

at Neyland Stadium • Knoxville, Tennessee

- Date: September 24, 2016
- Game time: 3:39 p.m. EDT
- Game weather: Temperature: 91 °F (33 °C) • Wind: NNE at 5 miles per hour (8.0 km/h) • Weather: Sunny
- Game attendance: 102,455
- Referee: Matt Loeffler
- TV announcers (CBS): Verne Lundquist and Gary Danielson
- Boxscore

Game information

First Quarter

- Florida – DeAndre Goolsby 3-yard pass from Austin Appleby (Eddy Piñeiro kick), 13:35

Second Quarter

- Florida – Jordan Cronkrite 15-yard pass from Austin Appleby (Eddy Piñeiro kick), 14:10
- Florida – Jordan Scarlett 1 yard run (Eddy Piñeiro kick), 5:12
- Tennessee – Aaron Medley 28-yard field goal, 2:39

Third Quarter

- Tennessee – Jalen Hurd 23-yard pass from Joshua Dobbs (Aaron Medley kick), 7:29
- Tennessee – Ethan Wolf 20-yard pass from Joshua Dobbs (Aaron Medley kick), 0:59

Fourth Quarter

- Tennessee – Jauan Jennings 67-yard pass from Joshua Dobbs (Aaron Medley kick), 12:45
- Tennessee – Josh Malone 42-yard pass from Joshua Dobbs (Aaron Medley kick), 11:48
- Tennessee – Joshua Dobbs 5-yard run (Aaron Medley kick), 8:27
- Florida – Freddie Swain 10-yard pass from Austin Appleby (Eddy Piñeiro kick), 4:17

Passing leaders

- FLA – Austin Appleby – 23/39, 296 yards, 3 touchdowns, 1 interception
- TENN – Joshua Dobbs – 16/32, 319 yards, 4 touchdowns, 1 interception

Rushing leaders

- FLA – Jordan Scarlett – 10 carries, 44 yards
- TENN – Jalen Hurd – 26 carries, 95 yards

Receiving leaders

- FLA – Antonio Callaway – 4 receptions, 134 yards
- TENN – Jauan Jennings – 3 receptions, 111 yards, 1 touchdown

Tackling leaders

- FLA – Alex Anzalone – 12 tackles
- TENN – Colton Jumper – 8 tackles

Overall record	Previous meeting	Previous winner
26–19	September 26, 2015	Florida, 28–27

Uniform Combination
Helmet	Jersey	Pants

Florida engineered a thrilling fourth quarter comeback in last year's contest. Tennessee led 27–14 with 10:19 remaining in the game. The Gators scored a touchdown with 4:09 remaining, and forced Tennessee to punt on the following possession. The next drive ended when Will Grier, facing 4th-and-14 at their own 37-yard line, completed a pass to Antonio Callaway who raced to the end zone to tie the game at 27. Jorge Powell made the extra point to give the Gators a one-point lead with 1:26 remaining. On the ensuing drive, Tennessee's Aaron Medley was able to attempt a game-winning 55-yard field goal with 3 seconds remaining, but missed wide right.

=== Vanderbilt ===
Florida Gators at Vanderbilt Commodores – Game summary

Quarter	1	2	3	4	Total
No. 23 Florida	0	10	0	3	13
Vanderbilt	0	3	3	0	6

at Vanderbilt Stadium • Nashville, Tennessee

- Date: October 1, 2016
- Game time: 12:01 p.m. EDT
- Game weather: Temperature: 66 °F (19 °C) • Wind: W at 6 miles per hour (9.7 km/h) • Weather: Cloudy
- Game attendance: 30,565
- Referee: James Carter
- TV announcers (SEC Network): Tom Hart and Andre Ware
- Boxscore

Game information

Second Quarter

- Florida – Jordan Scarlett 4-yard run (Eddy Piñeiro kick), 6:27
- Vanderbilt – Tommy Openshaw 38-yard field goal, 2:13
- Florida – Eddy Piñeiro 42-yard field goal, 0:00

Third Quarter

- Vanderbilt – Tommy Openshaw 27-yard field goal, 2:54

Fourth Quarter

- Florida – Eddy Piñeiro 26-yard field goal, 8:17

Passing leaders

- FLA – Austin Appleby – 19/28, 144 yards
- VAN – Kyle Shurmur – 9/25, 82 yards, 1 interception

Rushing leaders

- FLA – Jordan Scarlett – 12 carries, 55 yards, 1 touchdown
- VAN – Ralph Webb – 24 carries, 110 yards

Receiving leaders

- FLA – C'yontai Lewis – 2 receptions, 39 yards
- VAN – Kalija Lipscomb – 3 receptions, 43 yards

Tackling leaders

- FLA – Jarrad Davis – 15 tackles
- VAN – Zach Cunningham – 14 tackles

Overall record	Previous meeting	Previous winner
37–10–2	November 7, 2015	Florida, 9–7

Uniform Combination
Helmet	Jersey	Pants

Florida scored a touchdown in the first quarter of last year's game, but the extra point was missed. Vanderbilt's rush leader, Ralph Webb, ran 74-yards for a game-tying touchdown, and Hayden Lekacz made the extra point to put the Commodores ahead 7–6 to go into halftime. Every drive of the third quarter for both teams ended with a punt. Finally with 3:10 remaining in the fourth quarter, Austin Hardin made a 43-yard field goal to put the Gators ahead 9–7. The defense was able to hold off Vanderbilt on the ensuing drive, and the Gators were able to run off the final seconds to earn a 9–7 escape.

=== Missouri ===
Missouri Tigers at Florida Gators – Game summary

Quarter	1	2	3	4	Total
Missouri	0	0	7	7	14
No. 18 Florida	0	20	6	14	40

at Ben Hill Griffin Stadium • Gainesville, Florida

- Date: October 15, 2016
- Game time: 4:01 p.m. EDT
- Game weather: Temperature: 82 °F (28 °C) • Wind: E at 11 miles per hour (18 km/h) • Weather: Light rain, 75% humidity
- Game attendance: 88,825
- Referee: Brad Rogers
- TV announcers (SEC Network): Brent Musburger and Jesse Palmer
- Boxscore

Game information

Second Quarter

- Florida – Eddy Piñeiro 53-yard field goal, 11:56
- Florida – Eddy Piñeiro 24-yard field goal, 5:45
- Florida – Teez Tabor 39-yard interception return (Eddy Piñeiro kick), 3:25
- Florida – Quincy Wilson 78-yard interception return (Eddy Piñeiro kick), 1:14

Third Quarter

- Missouri – Josh Augusta 1 yard run (Tucker McCann kick), 12:32
- Florida – Tyree Cleveland 20-yard pass from Luke Del Rio, 3:47

Fourth Quarter

- Florida – Jordan Scarlett 33-yard run (Eddy Piñeiro kick), 11:43
- Missouri – Ish Witter 1 yard run (Tucker McCann kick), 1:23
- Florida – Antonio Callaway 44-yard kick return (Eddy Piñeiro kick), 1:17

Passing leaders

- MIZZ – Marvin Zanders – 3/4, 59 yards
- FLA – Luke Del Rio – 18/38, 236 yards, 1 touchdown, 3 interceptions

Rushing leaders

- MIZZ – Damarea Crockett – 14 carries, 145 yards
- FLA – La'Mical Perine – 11 carries, 106 yards

Receiving leaders

- MIZZ – Richaud Floyd – 1 reception, 34 yards
- FLA – Tyrie Cleveland – 3 receptions, 79 yards, 1 touchdown

Tackling leaders

- MIZZ – Michael Scherer – 10 tackles
- FLA – Alex Anzalone and Jarrad Davis – 8 tackles

Overall record	Previous meeting	Previous winner
2–2	October 10, 2015	Florida, 21–3

Uniform Combination
Helmet	Jersey	Pants

Last year's game saw both teams score on their opening drives – Florida with a touchdown, Missouri with a field goal. Florida scored a second touchdown in the first quarter, which after a scoreless second quarter gave the Gators a 14–3 lead over the Tigers. The Gators scored again with their third and final touchdown of the game in the third quarter, and held the Tigers scoreless through the second half, earning the Gators a 21–3 victory and 6–0 start to the season.

=== Georgia ===
Florida Gators vs. Georgia Bulldogs – Game summary

Quarter	1	2	3	4	Total
No. 14 Florida	7	7	7	3	24
Georgia	3	7	0	0	10

at EverBank Field • Jacksonville, Florida

- Date: October 29, 2016
- Game time: 3:39 p.m. EDT
- Game weather: Temperature: 80 °F (27 °C) • Wind: NE at 13 miles per hour (21 km/h) • Weather: Partly cloudy, 67% humidity
- Game attendance: 84,681
- Referee: Hubert Owens
- TV announcers (CBS): Verne Lundquist and Gary Danielson
- Boxscore

Game information

First Quarter

- Georgia – Rodrigo Blankenship 25-yard field goal, 9:59
- Florida – C'yontai Lewis 19-yard pass from Luke Del Rio (Eddy Piñeiro kick), 0:17

Second Quarter

- Georgia – Riley Ridley 14-yard pass from Jacob Eason (Rodrigo Blankenship kick), 12:02
- Florida – Jordan Scarlett 2-yard run (Eddy Piñeiro kick), 1:37

Third Quarter

- Florida – Antonio Callaway 4-yard run (Eddy Piñeiro kick), 3:11

Fourth Quarter

- Florida – Eddy Piñeiro 38-yard field goal, 4:24

Passing leaders

- FLA – Luke Del Rio – 15/25, 135 yards, 1 touchdown, 1 interception
- UGA – Jacob Eason – 15/33, 143 yards, 1 touchdown

Rushing leaders

- FLA – Jordan Scarlett – 26 carries, 93 yards, 1 touchdown
- UGA – Nick Chubb – 9 carries, 20 yards

Receiving leaders

- FLA – Antonio Callaway – 4 receptions, 42 yards
- UGA – Terry Godwin – 5 receptions, 57 yards

Tackling leaders

- FLA – Jarrad Davis – 7 tackles
- UGA – Deandre Baker – 10 tackles

Overall record	Previous meeting	Previous winner
42–49–2 (per Florida); 42–50–2 (per Georgia)	October 31, 2015	Florida, 27–3

Uniform Combination
Helmet	Jersey	Pants

One of only two neutral-site SEC series (Arkansas–Texas A&M), Florida and Georgia have played a storied series since 1906 (though Georgia contends that they first met in 1904). The game has been held in Jacksonville since 1933, only playing a home-and-home in 1994 and 1995 due to construction of Jacksonville Municipal Stadium.
Florida drew first blood in last year's game when a muffed punt was recovered by Florida in Georgia's end zone at the end of the first quarter. Florida entered the second quarter leading 6–0 after a muffed punt in the end zone, despite a blocked extra point. The Gators added to their lead in the second quarter with two touchdowns, one from Harris–Callaway touchdown pass, the other from a 3-yard run by Kelvin Taylor following Georgia quarterback Faton Bauta's second interception and went to the locker room with a 20–0 lead. Georgia scored the only points of the third quarter with Marshall Morgan's 26-yard field goal. Georgia's Faton Bauta threw his third interception of the game in the fourth quarter, and Florida answered with a 3-minute touchdown drive. Georgia's final drive of the game ended with a fifth interception for Faton Bauta, and Jim McElwain earned his first victory over the Gators' bitter rival in his first year.

=== Arkansas ===
Florida Gators at Arkansas Razorbacks – Game summary

Quarter	1	2	3	4	Total
No. 10 Florida	7	0	0	3	10
Arkansas	14	7	0	10	31

at Donald W. Reynolds Razorback Stadium • Fayetteville, Arkansas

- Date: November 5, 2016
- Game time: 3:37 p.m. EDT
- Game weather: Temperature: 66 °F (19 °C) • Wind: E at 3 miles per hour (4.8 km/h) • Weather: Scattered clouds
- Game attendance: 74,432
- Referee: David Smith
- TV announcers (CBS): Brad Nessler and Aaron Taylor
- Boxscore

Game information

First Quarter

- Arkansas – Santos Ramirez 24-yard interception return (Adam McFain kick), 12:20
- Arkansas – Rawleigh Williams III 6-yard run (Adam McFain kick), 5:56
- Florida – Duke Dawson 37-yard interception return (Eddy Piñeiro kick), 2:44

Second Quarter

- Arkansas – Drew Morgan 7-yard pass from Austin Allen (Adam McFain kick), 0:16

Fourth Quarter

- Arkansas – Adam McFain 36-yard field goal, 9:14
- Florida – Eddy Piñeiro 49-yard field goal, 6:41
- Arkansas – Rawleigh Williams III 41-yard run (Adam McFain kick), 5:40

Passing leaders

- FLA – Luke Del Rio – 19/37, 229 yards, 2 interceptions
- ARK – Austin Allen – 15/26, 243 yards, 1 touchdown, 1 interception

Rushing leaders

- FLA – Mark Thompson – 3 carries, 19 yards
- ARK – Rawleigh Williams III – 26 carries, 148 yards, 2 touchdowns

Receiving leaders

- FLA – Antonio Callaway 4 receptions, 44 yards
- ARK – Drew Morgan – 7 receptions, 95 yards, 1 touchdown

Tackling leaders

- FLA – Marcus Maye – 11 tackles
- ARK – Brooks Ellis, Dwayne Eugene, and Santos Ramirez – 5 tackles

Overall record	Previous meeting	Previous winner
9–1	October 5, 2013	Florida, 30–10

Uniform Combination
Helmet	Jersey	Pants

=== South Carolina ===
South Carolina Gamecocks at Florida Gators – Game summary

Quarter	1	2	3	4	Total
South Carolina	0	0	0	7	7
No. 22 Florida	7	7	6	0	20

at Ben Hill Griffin Stadium • Gainesville, Florida

- Date: November 12, 2016
- Game time: 12:08 p.m. EST
- Game weather: Temperature: 72 °F (22 °C) • Wind: ENE at 4 miles per hour (6.4 km/h) • Weather: Sunny, 51% humidity
- Game attendance: 89,614
- Referee: Brad Rogers
- TV announcers (CBS): Brad Nessler & Aaron Taylor
- Boxscore

Game information

First Quarter

- Florida – C'yontai Lewis 6-yard pass from Austin Appleby (Eddy Piñeiro kick), 11:17

Second Quarter

- Florida – Ahmad Fulwood 18-yard pass from Austin Appleby (Eddy Piñeiro kick), 9:37

Third Quarter

- Florida – Eddy Piñeiro 54-yard field goal, 7:28
- Florida – Eddy Piñeiro 36-yard field goal, 0:52

Fourth Quarter

- South carolina – David Williams 1 yard run (Elliott Fry kick), 6:53

Passing leaders

- SCAR – Jake Bentley – 18/33, 213 yards, 1 interception
- FLA – Austin Appleby – 17/21, 201 yards, 2 touchdowns, 1 interception

Rushing leaders

- SCAR – David Williams – 7 carries, 20 yards, 1 touchdown
- FLA – Jordan Scarlett – 20 carries, 134 yards

Receiving leaders

- SCAR – Hayden Hurst – 3 receptions, 63 yards
- FLA – Ahmad Fulwood – 2 receptions, 48 yards, 1 touchdown; Antonio Callaway – 4 receptions, 48 yards

Tackling leaders

- SCAR – Darius English – 10 tackles
- FLA – David Reese – 11 tackles

Overall record	Previous meeting	Previous winner
25–8–3	November 14, 2015	Florida, 24–14

Uniform Combination
Helmet	Jersey	Pants

Jim McElwain's predecessor Will Muschamp, in his first year as Steve Spurrier's full-time successor at South Carolina, returned to The Swamp for the first time since his 2014 firing from Florida.
Last year, Florida 17–0 lead to enter the fourth quarter before Pharoh Cooper and Perry Orth caught touchdown passes from each other on consecutive drives. On the ensuing drive, however, Florida was able to consolidate their squandered lead, and earned the game's final score as the Gamecocks were unable to answer.

=== LSU ===
==== Postponement and rescheduling ====
The 2016 Florida-LSU game was originally scheduled to be played at Ben Hill Griffin Stadium in Gainesville, on October 8. However, it was postponed on the Thursday before the contest due to the approach of Hurricane Matthew, which forced over one million Floridians to evacuate and caused almost $3 billion in damage as it moved up Florida's Atlantic coast on October 6 and 7. Administrators at the two schools had difficulty coming to agreement on when and where to reschedule the game. The most likely date appeared to be November 19, when both schools were scheduled to play home games against non-conference opponents. However, LSU athletic director Joe Alleva refused to buy out the school's contract with South Alabama and play Florida in Gainesville as originally scheduled, stating that "We are going to have a home game on November 19th." The reluctance of Florida officials to agree to move the game to Baton Rouge cast doubt on whether the contest would be played at all, and led to accusations that the Gators were "scared" to play LSU, comments that head coach Jim McElwain and Gator players strongly refuted.

Eventually, the SEC ruled that neither LSU nor Florida could compete in the SEC Championship Game if they did not play eight regular season conference games as originally scheduled. With Florida vying for the SEC East title at the time, the school agreed to play LSU in Baton Rouge on November 19. In exchange, the 2017 LSU – Florida game was to be moved from Baton Rouge to Gainesville. Florida athletic director Jeremy Foley was displeased with both the process and the outcome, which resulted in the loss of two home games from the Gators' seven game home slate in 2016. "The conference office asked us to find a solution in working with LSU, yet LSU was never a true partner in our discussions", Foley said in a written statement. "The Southeastern Conference offered some other solutions and the LSU administration made it clear that they were unwilling to consider other reasonable options."

==== The game ====
The first half was a defensive struggle, with LSU leading 7–3. The Tigers drove the ball inside the Florida 5-yard line to start the second half but came away with zero points after a fumbled snap on a field goal attempt passed incomplete. The Gators took advantage of that LSU miscue by scoring a 98-yard touchdown pass from graduate quarterback Austin Appleby to freshman receiver Tyrie Cleveland down the sideline to take a 10–7 lead. After an exchange of punts, LSU scored a field goal to tie the game at 10. Florida then made a pair of field goals to take a 16–10 lead, the second field goal being set up by an LSU lost fumble on a kickoff return. After driving down the field with less than a minute left, LSU had first-and-goal at UF's 7–yard line with 50 seconds left. The Tigers picked up 6 yards on the first two plays, but nothing on their next two. Gators defensive back Marcell Harris and defensive lineman Jordan Sherit helped stop running back Derrius Guice at the goal line on the last play of the game, sealing the victory and setting off a Gator celebration in the end zone. Florida head coach Jim McElwain became the first coach in conference history to lead his team to the SEC Championship Game in his first two seasons.

==== Statistics ====
Florida Gators at LSU Tigers – Game summary

Quarter	1	2	3	4	Total
No. 21 Florida	0	3	7	6	16
No. 16 Louisiana State	7	0	0	3	10

at Tiger Stadium • Baton Rouge, Louisiana

- Date: November 19, 2016
- Game time: 1:00 p.m. EST
- Game weather: Temperature: 69 °F (21 °C) • Wind: N at 16 miles per hour (26 km/h) • Weather: Sunny, 36% humidity
- Game attendance: 102,043
- Referee: Matt Austin
- TV: SECN
- Play-by-play

Game information

First quarter

- LSU Darrius Guice 1 yard run (Colby Delahoussaye Kick)

12 plays, 80 yards, 6:03

Second quarter

- UF Eddy Piñeiro 36 yard field goal

10 plays, 39 yards, 4:17

Third quarter

- UF Tyrie Cleveland 98 Yd pass from Austin Appleby (Eddy Piñeiro Kick)

1 play, 98 yards, 0:13

Fourth quarter

- LSU Colby Delahoussaye 22 Yd Field Goal

12 plays, 79 yards, 5:43

- UF Eddy Piñeiro 26 Yd Field Goal

15 plays, 70 yards, 7:41

- UF Eddy Piñeiro 34 Yd Field Goal

4 plays, 5 yards, 1:13

Top passers

- UF – Austin Appleby – 7/17, 144 Yards, TD
- LSU – Danny Etling – 14/25, 204 Yards

Top rushers

- UF – Jordan Scarlett – 22 Carries, 108 Yards
- LSU – Derrius Guice – 19 Carries, 83 Yards, TD

Top receivers

- UF – Tyrie Cleveland – 3 Receptions, 124 Yards, TD
- LSU – D. J. Chark – 2 Receptions, 46 Yards

Overall record	Previous meeting	Previous winner
31–28–3	October 17, 2015	LSU, 35–28

Uniform Combination
Helmet	Jersey	Pants

=== Florida State ===
Florida Gators at Florida State Seminoles – Game summary

Quarter	1	2	3	4	Total
No. 13 Florida	0	3	3	7	13
No. 15 Florida State	7	3	7	14	31

at Doak Campbell Stadium • Tallahassee, Florida

- Date: November 26, 2016
- Game time: 8:14 p.m. EST
- Game weather: Temperature: 53 °F (12 °C) • Wind: N at 10 miles per hour (16 km/h) • Weather: Clear skies
- Game attendance: 78,342
- Referee: Jeff Flanagan
- TV announcers (ABC): Joe Tessitore and Todd Blackledge
- Boxscore

Game information

First Quarter

- FSU – Dalvin Cook 17-yard run (Ricky Aguayo kick), 4:46

Second Quarter

- FSU – Ricky Aguayo 22-yard field goal, 14:47
- Florida – Eddy Piñeiro 38-yard field goal, 7:19

Third Quarter

- Florida – Eddy Piñeiro 41-yard field goal, 10:26
- FSU – Travis Rudolph 46-yard pass from Deondre Francois (Logan Tyler kick), 5:38

Fourth Quarter

- FSU – Freddie Stevenson 27-yard run (Logan Tyler kick), 12:51
- Florida – Marcell Harris 12-yard fumble return (Eddy Piñeiro kick), 10:45
- FSU – Deondre Francois 8-yard run (Logan Tyler kick), 1:00

Passing leaders

- FLA – Austin Appleby – 19/35, 149 yards
- FSU – Deondre Francois – 15/26, 138 yards, 1 touchdown, 1 interception

Rushing leaders

- FLA – Jordan Scarlett – 14 carries, 53 yards
- FSU – Dalvin Cook – 26 carries, 153 yards, 1 touchdown

Receiving leaders

- FLA – Antonio Callaway – 6 receptions, 58 yards
- FSU – Travis Rudolph – 4 receptions, 63 yards, 1 touchdown

Tackling leaders

- FLA – Marcell Harris – 11 tackles
- FSU – Josh Sweat and Matthew Thomas – 7 tackles

Overall record	Previous meeting	Previous winner
34–24–2	November 28, 2015	Florida State, 27–2

Uniform Combination
Helmet	Jersey	Pants

The record-breaking crowd at The Swamp witnessed the lowest score Florida has ever attained in the Florida–Florida State series. After a scoreless first quarter, Roberto Aguayo made a 45-yard field goal to give the Seminoles a 3–0 lead. Sean Maguire connected with Jeremy Kerr to extend the lead to ten before the halftime break. 9:39 into the third quarter, Roberto Aguayo made his second field goal, this time from 51 yards to extend the Seminole lead to 13. Florida's offense continued to be ineffective, and it took a safety midway through the fourth quarter to put the Gators on the board, trailing by 11. However, Dalvin Cook ran for 15 and 29 yards for two touchdowns, the latter coming with twenty seconds remaining in the game, and the no. 14 Seminoles embarrassed the no. 10 Gators at home 27–2.

=== Alabama ===
Florida Gators vs. Alabama Crimson Tide – Game summary

Quarter	1	2	3	4	Total
No. 1 Alabama	16	17	7	14	54
No. 15 Florida	9	7	0	0	16

at Georgia Dome • Atlanta

- Date: December 3, 2016
- Game time: 4:11 p.m. EST
- Game weather: Indoors
- Game attendance: 74,632
- Referee: Matt Loeffler
- TV announcers (CBS): Verne Lundquist and Gary Danielson
- Boxscore

Game information

First Quarter

- Florida – Antonio Callaway 5-yard pass from Austin Appleby (Eddy Piñeiro kick), 9:51
- Alabama – Adam Griffith 31-yard field goal, 6:58
- Alabama – Minkah Fitzpatrick 44-yard interception return (Adam Griffith kick), 5:06
- Alabama – Josh Jacobs 27-yard punt return, 1:42
- Florida – David Reese 98-yard PAT return, 1:42

Second Quarter

- Alabama – Gehrig Dieter 6-yard pass from Jalen Hurts (Adam Griffith kick), 11:55
- Alabama – Adam Griffith 25-yard field goal, 6:27
- Alabama – Josh Jacobs 6-yard run (Adam Griffith kick), 3:47
- Florida – DeAndre Goolsby 25-yard pass from Austin Appleby (Eddy Piñeiro kick), 0:19

Third Quarter

- Alabama – Bo Scarbrough 2-yard run (Adam Griffith kick), 3:32

Fourth Quarter

- Alabama – Bo Scarbrough 1 yard run (Adam Griffith kick), 9:15
- Alabama – Derrick Gore 10-yard run (Andy Pappanastos kick), 3:48

Passing leaders

- ALA – Jalen Hurts – 11/20, 138 yards, 1 touchdown
- FLA – Austin Appleby – 26/39, 261 yards, 2 touchdowns, 3 interceptions

Rushing leaders

- ALA – Bo Scarbrough – 11 carries, 91 yards, 2 touchdowns
- FLA – Jordan Scarlett – 11 carries, 17 yards

Receiving leaders

- ALA – Calvin Ridley – 4 receptions, 43 yards
- FLA – DeAndre Goolsby – 7 receptions, 91 yards, 1 touchdown

Tackling leaders

- ALA – Reuben Foster – 11 tackles
- FLA – C. J. Gardner-Johnson – 9 tackles

Overall record	Previous meeting	Previous winner
14–25	December 5, 2015	Alabama, 29–15

Uniform Combination
Helmet	Jersey	Pants

Since defeating Alabama in the 2008 SEC Championship Game, Florida has lost the last five games against Alabama. Florida trails 14–26 in the all-time series, but has a 4–4 record when playing the Crimson Tide in the SEC Championship Game.

=== Iowa ===
Florida Gators vs. Iowa Hawkeyes – Game summary

Quarter	1	2	3	4	Total
No. 20 Florida	3	7	7	13	30
No. 21 Iowa	3	0	0	0	3

at Raymond James Stadium • Tampa, Florida

- Date: January 2, 2017
- Game time: 1:00 p.m. EST
- Game weather: Temperature: 83 °F (28 °C) • Wind: 10 miles per hour (16 km/h) • Weather: Sunny
- Game attendance: 51,119
- Referee: Brad Van Vark
- TV announcers (ABC): Mike Patrick and Ed Cunningham
- Boxscore

Game information

First Quarter

- Iowa – Keith Duncan 36-yard field goal, 8:56
- Florida – Eddy Piñeiro 44-yard field goal, 5:42

Second Quarter

- Florida – Mark Thompson 85-yard pass from Austin Appleby (Eddy Piñeiro kick), 1:46

Third Quarter

- Florida – DeAndre Goolsby 6-yard pass from Austin Appleby (Eddy Piñeiro kick), 0:48

Fourth Quarter

- Florida – C. J. Gardner-Johnson 58-yard interception return (Eddy Piñeiro kick), 14:44
- Florida – Eddy Piñeiro 25-yard field goal, 9:46
- Florida – Eddy Piñeiro 48-yard field goal, 5:57

Passing leaders

- FLA – Austin Appleby – 15/25, 222 yards, 2 touchdowns, 2 interceptions
- Iowa – C. J. Beathard – 7/25, 55 yards, 3 interceptions

Rushing leaders

- FLA – Jordan Scarlett – 14 carries, 94 yards
- Iowa – Akrum Wadley – 22 carries, 115 yards

Receiving leaders

- FLA – Mark Thompson – 1 reception, 85 yards, 1 touchdown
- Iowa – Akrum Wadley – 4 receptions, 21 yards

Tackling leaders

- FLA – Marcell Harris – 9 tackles
- Iowa – Josey Jewell – 10 tackles

Overall record	Previous meeting	Previous winner
2–1	January 2, 2006	Florida, 31–24

Uniform Combination
Helmet	Jersey	Pants

== Personnel ==
=== Roster ===
2016 Florida Gators roster
Quarterbacks: 11 Kyle Trask – Freshman; 12 Austin Appleby – (redshirt) Senior; 13 Feleipe Franks – Freshman; 14 Luke Del Rio – (redshirt) Sophomore; 37 Harry Gornto V – (redshirt) Freshman; Running backs: 22 La'Mical Perine – Freshman; 24 Mark Thompson– (redshirt) Junior; 25 Jordan Scarlett – Sophomore; 32 Jordan Cronkrite – Sophomore; 33 Tyriek Hopkins – (redshirt) Freshman; 36 Case Harrison – (redshirt) Junior; 37 Mark Herndon – (redshirt) Senior; Wide receivers: 4 Brandon Powell – Junior; 5 Ahmad Fulwood – Senior; 9 Dre Massey – Junior; 10 Josh Hammond – Freshman; 16 Freddie Swain – Freshman; 18 C.J. Worton – Junior; 43 Glenn Jarriel – (redshirt) Freshman; 46 Isaac O'Neal – (redshirt) Freshman; 81 Antonio Callaway – Sophomore; 83 Rick Wells – Freshman; 85 Chris Thompson – Senior; 87 Kalif Jackson – (redshirt) Freshman; 89 Tyrie Cleveland – Freshman; Tight ends: 16 Brian Fallace – (redshirt) Sophomore; 30 DeAndre Goolsby – Junior; 39 Ryan Ferguson – (redshirt) Sophomore; 80 C'yontai Lewis – (redshirt) Sophomore; 82 Moral Stephens – (redshirt) Sophomore; 84 Camrin Knight – Sophomore; Punters: 19 Johnny Townsend – (redshirt) Junior; 97 Jon Gould – (redshirt) Freshman	Offensive line: 51 Antonio Riles – (redshirt) Junior; 53 Kavaris Harkless – (redshirt) Sophomore; 54 Cameron Dillard – (redshirt) Junior; 59 T.J. McCoy – (redshirt) Freshman; 60 Zach Shinn – (redshirt) Sophomore; 61 Brett Heggie – Freshman; 64 Tyler Jordan – Sophomore; 65 Jawaan Taylor – Freshman; 66 Nick Buchanan – (redshirt) Freshman; 67 Brandon Sandifer – (redshirt) Freshman; 68 Richerd Desir-Jones – (redshirt) Freshman; 69 Marcus Givens – (redshirt) Freshman; 71 Nick Villano – (redshirt) Freshman; 72 Stone Forsythe – Freshman; 73 Martez Ivey – Sophomore; 74 Fred Johnson – Sophomore; 76 Marcel Benalcazar – Senior; 77 Andrew Mike – (redshirt) Sophomore; 78 David Sharpe – Junior; Defensive line: 17 Jordan Sherit – (redshirt) Junior; 42 Jordan Smith – Freshman; 54 Khairi Clark – (redshirt) Sophomore; 55 Thomas Holley – (redshirt) Sophomore; 57 Caleb Brantley – (redshirt) Junior; 62 Andrew Ivie – (redshirt) Freshman; 70 Forrest Palmore – (redshirt) Sophomore; 90 Antonneous Clayton – Freshman; 91 Joey Ivie – Senior; 92 Jabari Zuniga – (redshirt) Freshman; 93 Taven Bryan – (redshirt) Sophomore; 94 Bryan Cox Jr. – (redshirt) Senior; 95 Keivonnis Davis – Sophomore; 96 CeCe Jefferson – Sophomore; 97 Justus Reed – (redshirt) Sophomore; 98 Luke Ancrum – (redshirt) Freshman; 99 Jachai Polite – Freshman; Placekickers: 15 Eddy Piñeiro – (redshirt) Sophomore; 34 Neil MacInnes – Senior; 79 Daniel Justino – Freshman; 98 Jorge Powell – (redshirt) Sophomore	Linebackers: 11 Vosean Joseph – Freshman; 13 Daniel McMillian – Senior; 25 Matt Rolin – (redshirt) Junior; 28 Kylan Johnson – (redshirt) Freshman; 33 David Reese – Freshman; 34 Alex Anzalone – Senior; 40 Jarrad Davis – Senior; 41 Darius Singletary – (redshirt) Freshman; 44 Rayshad Jackson – (redshirt) Freshman; 45 R.J. Raymond – (redshirt) Sophomore; 46 Will Thomas – Freshman; 50 Jeremiah Moon – Freshman; 52 Steven Stipe – (redshirt) Junior; 56 Cristian Garcia – (redshirt) Junior; 58 Jahim Lawrence – (redshirt) Freshman; Defensive backs: 6 Quincy Wilson – Junior; 7 Duke Dawson – Junior; 8 Nick Washington – (redshirt) Junior; 12 Christopher McWilliams – Freshman; 14 Chris Williamson – Sophomore; 20 Marcus Maye – (redshirt) Senior; 21 McArthur Burnett – Freshman; 23 C. J. Gardner-Johnson – Freshman; 26 Marcell Harris – (redshirt) Junior; 27 Quincy Lenton – Freshman; 29 Jeawon Taylor – Freshman; 30 Garrett Stephens – (redshirt) Junior; 31 Teez Tabor – Junior; 35 Joseph Putu – Junior; 36 Eddie Giles – (redshirt) Sophomore; 39 Michael Iorio – (redshirt) Senior; 43 Mark Norvelis – (redshirt) Senior; Long snappers: 41 Ryan Farr – Sophomore; 47 Jonathan Haney – (redshirt) Senior; 49 Devin Grimm – (redshirt) Sophomore; 49 Jacob Tilghman – (redshirt) Freshman

=== Coaching staff ===
Name	Position	Joined staff
Jim McElwain	Head coach	2015
Doug Nussmeier	Offensive coordinator / quarterbacks	2015
Geoff Collins	Defensive coordinator	2015
Greg Nord	Tight Ends / Special Teams	2015
Tim Skipper	Running Backs	2015
Kerry Dixon II	Wide receivers	2015
Mike Summers	offensive line	2014
Randy Shannon	Associate head coach / Linebackers	2015
Chris Rumph	Defensive line	2015
Torrian Gray	Defensive Backs	2016
Mike Kent	Director of strength & conditioning	2015

== Players drafted into the NFL ==
Round	Pick	Player	Position	NFL club
1	21	Jarrad Davis	LB	Detroit Lions
2	39	Marcus Maye	S	New York Jets
2	46	Quincy Wilson	CB	Indianapolis Colts
2	53	Teez Tabor	CB	Detroit Lions
3	76	Alex Anzalone	LB	New Orleans Saints
4	129	David Sharpe	OT	Oakland Raiders
6	185	Caleb Brantley	DT	Cleveland Browns
7	228	Joey Ivie	DT	Dallas Cowboys
