= 2016 Ole Miss Rebels football team =

American college football season

2016 Ole Miss Rebels football
- Conference: Southeastern Conference
- Western Division
- Record: 0–7, 5 wins vacated (0–6 SEC, 2 wins vacated)
- Head coach: Hugh Freeze (5th season)
- Co-offensive coordinators: Matt Luke (5th season); Dan Werner (7th season)
- Offensive scheme: Spread (tempo)
- Co-defensive coordinators: Dave Wommack (5th season); Jason Jones (4th season)
- Base defense: Multiple
- Home stadium: Vaught–Hemingway Stadium

2016 Southeastern Conference football standings
	Conf.			Overall
Team	W		L	W		L
Eastern Division
No. 14 Florida x	6	–	2	9	–	4
No. 22 Tennessee	4	–	4	9	–	4
Georgia	4	–	4	8	–	5
Kentucky	4	–	4	7	–	6
South Carolina	3	–	5	6	–	7
Vanderbilt	3	–	5	6	–	7
Missouri*	2	–	6	4	–	8
Western Division
No. 2 Alabama x$^	8	–	0	14	–	1
No. 24 Auburn	5	–	3	8	–	5
No. 13 LSU	5	–	3	8	–	4
Texas A&M	4	–	4	8	–	5
Arkansas	3	–	5	7	–	6
Mississippi State	3	–	5	6	–	7
Ole Miss*	2	–	6	5	–	7
Championship: Alabama 54, Florida 16
^ – College Football Playoff participant; $ – Conference champion; x – Division champion/co-champions; * Ole Miss and Missouri vacated all wins due to NCAA violations.; Rankings from AP Poll

The 2016 Ole Miss Rebels football team represented the University of Mississippi in the 2016 NCAA Division I FBS football season. The Rebels played their home games at the newly renovated Vaught–Hemingway Stadium in Oxford, Mississippi and competed in the Western Division of the Southeastern Conference (SEC). They were led by fifth-year head coach Hugh Freeze in what would turn out to be his final season with the Rebels. They finished the season 5–7, 2–6 in SEC play to finish in last place in the Western Division.

On February 11, 2019, Ole Miss announced the vacation of all wins in the years 2010, 2011, 2012, and 2016. In 2013, all wins except the Music City Bowl were vacated. In 2014, all wins except the Presbyterian game were vacated.

== Offseason ==
=== NCAA investigation ===
The offseason was a controversial one for the Rebels, where an ongoing NCAA investigation dominated college football headlines. The investigation began prior to the start of the 2015 season, where Ole Miss star offensive tackle Laremy Tunsil was arrested on charges of domestic violence after allegedly assaulting his stepfather, Lindsey Miller. Ole Miss coach Hugh Freeze announced that Tunsil was defending his mother, Desiree Tunsil. A police report that was released days after the incident stated that Miller claimed Tunsil was "riding around with football agents" and that when a deputy arrived at the scene of the incident, "Tunsil and the agents" left in a yellow convertible. Days later, NCAA officials interviewed Miller about allegations of multiple violations of rules by the Ole Miss football program; Hugh Freeze later dismissed the possibility of a violation of rules, saying he's confident his program "always does the right thing". In August 2015, Tunsil and Miller agreed to drop charges against each other and sign dismissal forms. However, Tunsil was suspended from the first seven games of the 2015 season, making his debut against Texas A&M. In October 2015, Ole Miss announced that Tunsil used three loaner vehicles over a six-month period without payment, among other impermissible benefits.

Only a few days later, an NCAA investigation of Louisiana Lafayette revealed that former Ole Miss coach David Saunders may have committed violations while at Ole Miss. Saunders allegedly helped five recruits receive fraudulent ACT scores at Wayne County High School, lied to the NCAA about his involvement and failed to cooperate with the subsequent investigation. He also allegedly gave a total of $6,500 to a player over the course of two semesters while at Louisiana Lafayette.

In January 2016, after the Rebels' Sugar Bowl victory over Oklahoma State, Ole Miss received a notice of allegations from the NCAA. However, Ole Miss athletic director Ross Bjork stated that the majority of the violations occurred before his arrival at Ole Miss and before the hiring of Hugh Freeze. In February, Bjork said that the NCAA has completed its investigation of Ole Miss's football program, and also stated that he did not expect a "second letter" from the NCAA concerning additional violations and that Freeze was not named by the NCAA in any wrongdoing.

At this point, the investigation was seemingly coming to an end, but on the night of the NFL draft, Laremy Tunsil's Instagram account was hacked, and a video of him smoking a bong fashioned out of a gas mask is posted, as well as photos of text messages where Tunsil asks for money from an Ole Miss administrator. When asked if he ever received money while at Ole Miss, Tunsil admitted that he did, in fact, receive money.

As a result of the investigation, Ole Miss self-imposed an 11-scholarship reduction over the course of four seasons. Along with the reduction of scholarships, the school has also suspended two unnamed assistants from recruiting, fined itself $159,352 and required current staff to go through additional training on NCAA rules and policy. In August 2016, it was announced that NCAA investigators have interviewed players at rival SEC schools about their recruitment by Ole Miss. NCAA Enforcement representatives have visited Auburn and Mississippi State, along with perhaps one other unnamed SEC West school during the summer of 2016. The players were granted immunity from possible NCAA sanctions in exchange for truthful accounts of their recruitment.

=== 2016 recruiting class ===
The 2016 National Signing Day was Wednesday, February 3, 2016. The Rebels signed a total of 24 prospects to a letter of intent, headlined by 5-star quarterback Shea Patterson and 5-star offensive tackle Greg Little and 5 star defensive tackle Benito Jones. According to 247Sports.com. The Rebels' 2016 recruiting class is considered to be the best in school history, surpassing the 2013 class.

College recruiting (2016)
Name	Hometown	School	Height	Weight	40^{‡}	Commit date
Greg Little; OT	Allen, Texas	Allen High School	6 ft 5.5 in (1.97 m)	305 lb (138 kg)	–	Dec 16, 2015
Greg Little; OT	Recruit ratings: Scout: Rivals: 247Sports: ESPN:					
Shea Patterson; QB	Bradenton, Florida	IMG Academy	6 ft 1.5 in (1.87 m)	192 lb (87 kg)	–	Feb 17, 2015
Shea Patterson; QB	Recruit ratings: Scout: Rivals: 247Sports: ESPN:					
Benito Jones; DT	Waynesboro, Mississippi	Wayne County High School	6 ft 2 in (1.88 m)	285 lb (129 kg)	–	Aug 17, 2014
Benito Jones; DT	Recruit ratings: Scout: Rivals: 247Sports: ESPN:					
A. J. Brown; WR	Starkville, Mississippi	Starkville High School	6 ft 1 in (1.85 m)	220 lb (100 kg)	–	Feb 3, 2016
A. J. Brown; WR	Recruit ratings: Scout: Rivals: 247Sports: ESPN:					
Deontay Anderson; S	Manvel, Texas	Manvel High School	6 ft 1 in (1.85 m)	192 lb (87 kg)	–	Feb 3, 2016
Deontay Anderson; S	Recruit ratings: Scout: Rivals: 247Sports: ESPN:					
DK Metcalf; WR	Oxford, Mississippi	Oxford High School	6 ft 3.75 in (1.92 m)	205 lb (93 kg)	–	Jun 8, 2013
DK Metcalf; WR	Recruit ratings: Scout: Rivals: 247Sports: ESPN:					
Octavious Cooley; TE	Laurel, Mississippi	Laurel High School	6 ft 3 in (1.91 m)	220 lb (100 kg)	–	Dec 31, 2014
Octavious Cooley; TE	Recruit ratings: Scout: Rivals: 247Sports: ESPN:					
Tre Nixon; WR	Melbourne, Florida	Viera High School	6 ft 1 in (1.85 m)	170 lb (77 kg)	–	Jan 25, 2016
Tre Nixon; WR	Recruit ratings: Scout: Rivals: 247Sports: ESPN:					
Jaylon Jones; CB	Allen, Texas	Allen High School	5 ft 11 in (1.80 m)	182 lb (83 kg)	–	Jul 28, 2015
Jaylon Jones; CB	Recruit ratings: Scout: Rivals: 247Sports: ESPN:					
D'Vaughn Pennamon; APB	Manvel, Texas	Manvel High School	5 ft 11 in (1.80 m)	220 lb (100 kg)	–	Jul 21, 2015
D'Vaughn Pennamon; APB	Recruit ratings: Scout: Rivals: 247Sports: ESPN:					
Bryce Mathews; OT	Brentwood, Tennessee	Brentwood Academy	6 ft 5.5 in (1.97 m)	280 lb (130 kg)	–	Jul 24, 2015
Bryce Mathews; OT	Recruit ratings: Scout: Rivals: 247Sports: ESPN:					
Charles Wiley; WDE	Stockbridge, Georgia	Stockbridge High School	6 ft 2.5 in (1.89 m)	234 lb (106 kg)	–	Mar 29, 2015
Charles Wiley; WDE	Recruit ratings: Scout: Rivals: 247Sports: ESPN:					
Justin Connor; RB	Sardis, Mississippi	North Panola High School	5 ft 10 in (1.78 m)	190 lb (86 kg)	–	Aug 16, 2013
Justin Connor; RB	Recruit ratings: Scout: Rivals: 247Sports: ESPN:					
Gabe Angel; TE	Cookeville, Tennessee	Cookeville High School	6 ft 3 in (1.91 m)	212 lb (96 kg)	–	Nov 30, 2014
Gabe Angel; TE	Recruit ratings: Scout: Rivals: 247Sports: ESPN:					
Jacob Mathis; TE	Tampa Bay, Florida	Berkeley Prep High School	6 ft 3.5 in (1.92 m)	223 lb (101 kg)	–	Feb 3, 2016
Jacob Mathis; TE	Recruit ratings: Scout: Rivals: 247Sports: ESPN:					
Royce Newman; OT	Nashville, Illinois	Nashville Community College	6 ft 7 in (2.01 m)	255 lb (116 kg)	–	Jan 25, 2016
Royce Newman; OT	Recruit ratings: Scout: Rivals: 247Sports: ESPN:					
Chandler Tuitt; OG	Tyrone, Georgia	Sandy Creek High School	6 ft 3 in (1.91 m)	294 lb (133 kg)	–	Jul 17, 2015
Chandler Tuitt; OG	Recruit ratings: Scout: Rivals: 247Sports: ESPN:					
Eli Johnson; OC	Oxford, Mississippi	Lafayette High School	6 ft 3 in (1.91 m)	295 lb (134 kg)	–	Dec 10, 2013
Eli Johnson; OC	Recruit ratings: Scout: Rivals: 247Sports: ESPN:					
Josiah Coatney; SDE	Goodman, Mississippi	Holmes Community College	6 ft 5 in (1.96 m)	285 lb (129 kg)	–	May 5, 2016
Josiah Coatney; SDE	Recruit ratings: Scout: 247Sports:					
Greg Eisworth; S	Grand Prairie, Texas	South Grand Prairie High School	5 ft 11.5 in (1.82 m)	185 lb (84 kg)	–	Apr 12, 2015
Greg Eisworth; S	Recruit ratings: Scout: Rivals: 247Sports: ESPN:					
Donta Evans; ILB	Lawrenceville, Georgia	Archer High School	6 ft 1 in (1.85 m)	230 lb (100 kg)	–	Aug 2, 2015
Donta Evans; ILB	Recruit ratings: Scout: Rivals: 247Sports: ESPN:					
Jarrion Street; RB	Trussville, Alabama	Hewitt-Trussville High School	6 ft 1 in (1.85 m)	195 lb (88 kg)	–	Jul 18, 2015
Jarrion Street; RB	Recruit ratings: Scout: Rivals: 247Sports: ESPN:					
Myles Hartsfield; S	Great Barrington, Massachusetts	East Coast Prep	6 ft 0 in (1.83 m)	195 lb (88 kg)	–	Dec 15, 2015
Myles Hartsfield; S	Recruit ratings: Scout: Rivals: 247Sports: ESPN:					
Jack DeFoor; OT	Calhoun, Georgia	Calhoun High School	6 ft 5 in (1.96 m)	260 lb (120 kg)	–	May 15, 2015
Jack DeFoor; OT	Recruit ratings: Scout: Rivals: 247Sports: ESPN:					
Detric Bing-Dukes; ILB	Tucker, Georgia	Tucker High School	6 ft 0 in (1.83 m)	230 lb (100 kg)	–	Mar 3, 2016
Detric Bing-Dukes; ILB	Recruit ratings: Scout: 247Sports:					
Tariqious Tisdale; LB	Lexington, Tennessee	Lexington High School	6 ft 5 in (1.96 m)	247 lb (112 kg)	–	Jun 7, 2015
Tariqious Tisdale; LB	Recruit ratings: Scout: Rivals: 247Sports: ESPN:					
Overall recruit ranking: Scout: 5 Rivals: 8 247Sports: 6 ESPN: 4
Note: In many cases, Scout, Rivals, 247Sports, On3, and ESPN may conflict in their listings of height and weight.; In these cases, the average was taken. ESPN grades are on a 100-point scale.; Sources: "2016 Ole Miss Football Commitment List". Rivals.; "2016 Ole Miss Commits". Scout.; "2016 Players Commitments – Ole Miss". ESPN.; "Scout.com Team Recruiting Rankings". Scout.; "2016 Team Ranking". Rivals.com.; "2016 Ole Miss Rebels football team". 247Sports.

=== Coaching staff ===
Name	Position	Year at Ole Miss	Alma mater (Year)
Hugh Freeze	Head Coach	5th	Southern Miss (1992)
Matt Luke	Assistant head coach/co-offensive coordinator/offensive line	5th	Ole Miss (2000)
Dan Werner	Co-offensive coordinator/quarterbacks	5th	Western Michigan (1983)
Maurice Harris	Tight ends/recruiting coordinator For Offense	5th	Arkansas State (1998)
Grant Heard	Wide receivers	5th	Ole Miss (2001)
Derrick Nix	Running backs	9th	Southern Miss (2002)
Jason Jones	Co-defensive coordinator/cornerbacks	4th	Alabama (2001)
Dave Wommack	Associate head coach for Defense/co-defensive coordinator/linebackers	5th	Missouri Southern State (1978)
Chris Kiffin	Defensive line/recruiting coordinator For Defense	5th	Colorado State (2005)
Corey Batoon	Special Teams Coach/safeties	2nd	Long Beach State (1991)
Paul Jackson	Head strength & conditioning coach	5th	Montclair State (2006)

== Schedule ==
Ole Miss announced its 2016 football schedule on October 29, 2015. The 2016 schedule consists of 7 home games, 5 away games and 1 neutral site game in the regular season. The Rebels will host SEC foes Alabama, Auburn, Georgia, and Mississippi State, and will travel to Arkansas, LSU, Texas A&M, and Vanderbilt.

The Rebels hosted three of its four non–conference games against Georgia Southern from the Sun Belt Conference, Memphis from the American Athletic Conference and Wofford from the Southern Conference. Ole Miss started the season at a neutral site in Orlando, Florida on Labor Day against Florida State of the Atlantic Coast Conference.

Date	Time	Opponent	Rank	Site	TV	Result	Attendance
September 5	7:00 p.m.	vs. No. 4 Florida State*	No. 11	Camping World Stadium; Orlando, Florida (Camping World Kickoff)	ESPN	L 34–45	63,042
September 10	3:00 p.m.	Wofford*	No. 19	Vaught–Hemingway Stadium; Oxford, Mississippi	SECN	W 38–13 (vacated)	64,232
September 17	2:30 p.m.	No. 1 Alabama	No. 19	Vaught–Hemingway Stadium; Oxford, Mississippi (rivalry / SEC Nation)	CBS	L 43–48	66,176
September 24	11:00 a.m.	No. 12 Georgia	No. 23	Vaught–Hemingway Stadium; Oxford, Mississippi	ESPN	W 45–14 (vacated)	65,843
October 1	6:00 p.m.	Memphis*^{†}	No. 16	Vaught–Hemingway Stadium; Oxford, Mississippi (rivalry)	ESPN2	W 48–28 (vacated)	65,889
October 15	6:00 p.m.	at No. 22 Arkansas	No. 12	D.W.R. Razorback Stadium; Fayetteville, Arkansas (rivalry)	ESPN	L 30–34	73,786
October 22	8:00 p.m.	at No. 25 LSU	No. 23	Tiger Stadium; Baton Rouge, Louisiana (Magnolia Bowl)	ESPN	L 21–38	101,720
October 29	6:15 p.m.	No. 15 Auburn		Vaught–Hemingway Stadium; Oxford, Mississippi (rivalry)	SECN	L 29–40	65,927
November 5	11:00 a.m.	Georgia Southern*		Vaught–Hemingway Stadium; Oxford, Mississippi	ESPNU	W 37–27 (vacated)	60,263
November 12	6:30 p.m.	at No. 10 Texas A&M		Kyle Field; College Station, Texas	SECN	W 29–28 (vacated)	104,892
November 19	7:00 p.m.	at Vanderbilt		Vanderbilt Stadium; Nashville, Tennessee (rivalry)	SECN	L 17–38	27,763
November 26	2:30 p.m.	Mississippi State		Vaught–Hemingway Stadium; Oxford, Mississippi (Egg Bowl)	SECN	L 20–55	66,038
*Non-conference game; ^{†}Homecoming; Rankings from AP Poll released prior to game.; All times are in Central time; Source: fbschedules.com

== Game summaries ==
=== Vs. No. 4 Florida State ===
Uniform Combination
Helmet	Jersey	Pants

No. 11 Ole Miss Rebels vs. No. 4 Florida State Seminoles

Quarter	1	2	3	4	Total
No. 11 Rebels	7	21	0	6	34
No. 4 Seminoles	3	10	23	9	45

at Camping World Stadium • Orlando, FL

- Date: Monday, September 5, 2016
- Game time: 7:00 p.m. CST (8:00 p.m. local EST)
- Game weather: Overcast • Temperature: 81 °F (27 °C)
- Game attendance: 63,042
- Referee: Brad Van Vark
- TV announcers (ESPN):
  Chris Fowler (play-by-play)
  Kirk Herbstreit (color)
  Samantha Ponder (sideline)

Game information

First Quarter

- (13:14) Ole Miss – Damore'ea Stringfellow 3 yard pass from Chad Kelly
  Ole Miss 7–0; 6 plays, 75 yards, 1:46
- (0:01) Florida State – Roberto Aguayo 25 yard field goal
  Ole Miss 7–3; 13 plays, 75 yards, 6:31

Second Quarter

- (12:42) Ole Miss – D.K. Metcalf 3 yard pass from Chad Kelly (Gary Wunderlich kick)
  Ole Miss 14–3; 9 plays, 75 yards, 2:19
- (9:42) Ole Miss – Evan Engram 21 yard pass from Chad Kelly (Gary Wunderlich kick)
  Ole Miss 21–3; 6 plays, 72 yards, 1:56
- (4:49) Florida State – Roberto Aguayo 21 yard field goal
  Ole Miss 21–6; 10 plays, 71 yards, 4:53
- (3:04) Ole Miss – Akeem Judd 11 yard run (Gary Wunderlich kick)
  Ole Miss 28–6; 10 plays, 80 yards, 1:40
- (0:28) Florida State – Travis Rudolph 16 yard pass from Deondre Francois (Roberto Aguayo kick)
  Ole Miss 28–13; 9 plays, 75 yards, 2:29

Third Quarter

- (12:18) Florida State – Roberto Aguayo 40 yard field goal
  Ole Miss 28–16; 7 plays, 52 yards, 2:42
- (11:28) Florida State – Freddie Stevenson 1 yard run (Roberto Aguayo kick)
  Ole Miss 28–23; 3 plays, 32 yards, 0:41
- (9:17) Florida State – Kermit Whitfield 3 yard run (Two-Point Pass Conversion Failed)
  Florida State 29–28; 3 plays, 11 yards, 1:30
- (4:12) Florida State – Ryan Izzo 2 yard pass from Deondre Francois (Roberto Aguayo kick)
  Florida State 36–28; 8 plays, 77 yards, 4:24

Fourth Quarter

- (12:56) Florida State – Roberto Aguayo 40 yard field goal
  Florida State 39–28; 14 plays, 51 yards, 4:58
- (12:09) Ole Miss – Van Jefferson 20 yard pass from Chad Kelly (Two-Point Pass Conversion Failed)
  Florida State 39–34; 4 plays, 75 yards, 0:47
- (9:16) Florida State – Roberto Aguayo 44 yard field goal
  Florida State 42–34; 7 plays, 26 yards, 2:44
- (4:53) Florida State – Roberto Aguayo 30 yard field goal
  Florida State 45–34; 8 plays, 50 yards, 3:23

Statistics	MISS	FSU
First downs	21	32
Total yards	380	580
Rushes/yards	25/67	41/161
Passing yards	313	419
Passing: Comp–Att–Int	21–39–3	33–52–0
Time of possession	17:21	42:39

Team	Category	Player	Statistics
Ole Miss	Passing	Chad Kelly	21/39, 313 yards, 4 TD, 3 INT
Ole Miss	Rushing	Akeem Judd	8 carries, 44 yards, 1 TD
Ole Miss	Receiving	Evan Engram	9 receptions, 121 yards, 1 TD
Florida State	Passing	Deondre Francois	33/52, 419 yards, 2 TD
Florida State	Rushing	Dalvin Cook	23 carries, 91 yards
Florida State	Receiving	Jesus Wilson	9 receptions, 125 yards

=== Wofford ===
Uniform Combination
Helmet	Jersey	Pants

Wofford Terriers (1–0) at No. 19 Ole Miss Rebels (0–1)

Quarter	1	2	3	4	Total
Terriers	0	3	0	10	13
No. 19 Rebels	10	14	7	7	38

at Vaught–Hemingway Stadium • Oxford, MS

- Date: Saturday, September 10, 2016
- Game time: 3:00 p.m. CST
- Game weather: Partly Cloudy • Temperature: 90 °F (32 °C)
- Game attendance: 64,232
- Referee: Charles Lewis
- TV announcers (SECN):
  Tom Hart (play-by-play)
  Andre Ware (color)
  Cole Cubelic (sideline)

Game information

First Quarter

- (13:03) Ole Miss – Gary Wunderlich 40 yard field goal
  Ole Miss 3–0; 9 plays, 42 yards, 1:57
- (7:11) Ole Miss – Markell Pack 5 yard pass from Chad Kelly (Gary Wunderlich kick)
  Ole Miss 10–0; 13 plays, 81 yards, 3:51

Second Quarter

- (13:50) Ole Miss – D.K. Metcalf 10 yard pass from Chad Kelly (Gary Wunderlich kick)
  Ole Miss 17–0; 11 plays, 92 yards, 3:01
- (4:38) Wofford – David Marvin 29 yard field goal
  Ole Miss 17–3; 17 plays, 70 yards, 9:12
- (1:36) Ole Miss – Quincy Adeboyejo 6 yard pass from Chad Kelly (Gary Wunderlich kick)
  Ole Miss 24–3; 6 plays, 38 yards, 3:02

Third Quarter

- (5:07) Ole Miss – Jason Pellerin 3 yard run (Gary Wunderlich kick)
  Ole Miss 31–3; 8 plays, 77 yards, 2:58

Fourth Quarter

- (10:27) Wofford – Brad Butler 17 yard run (David Marvin kick)
  Ole Miss 31–10; 4 plays, 41 yards, 1:43
- (6:16) Ole Miss – A.J. Brown 12 yard pass from Jason Pellerin (Gary Wunderlich kick)
  Ole Miss 38–10; 8 play, 52 yards, 4:11
- (2:28) Wofford – David Marvin 50 yard field goal
  Ole Miss 38–13; 7 plays, 49 yards, 3:48

Statistics	WOFF	MISS
First downs	18	22
Total yards	305	416
Rushes/yards	57/233	34/174
Passing yards	72	242
Passing: Comp–Att–Int	5–9–0	22–30–1
Time of possession	35:26	24:34

Team	Category	Player	Statistics
Wofford	Passing	Brad Butler	4/7, 40 yards
Wofford	Rushing	Brad Butler	12 carries, 59 yards, 1 TD
Wofford	Receiving	Cole Cleary	2 receptions, 39 yards
Ole Miss	Passing	Chad Kelly	20/27, 219 yards, 3 TD
Ole Miss	Rushing	Akeem Judd	11 carries, 64 yards
Ole Miss	Receiving	Markell Pack	3 receptions, 46 yards, 1 TD

=== No. 1 Alabama ===
Uniform Combination
Helmet	Jersey	Pants

No. 1 Alabama Crimson Tide (2–0) at No. 19 Ole Miss Rebels (1–1)

Quarter	1	2	3	4	Total
No. 1 Crimson Tide	3	14	17	14	48
No. 19 Rebels	7	17	3	16	43

at Vaught–Hemingway Stadium • Oxford, MS

- Date: Saturday, September 17, 2016
- Game time: 2:30 p.m. CST
- Game weather: Partly Cloudy • Temperature: 83 °F (28 °C)
- Game attendance: 66,176
- Referee: Hubert Owens
- TV announcers (CBS):
  Verne Lundquist (play-by-play)
  Gary Danielson (color)
  Allie LaForce (sideline)

Game information

First Quarter

- (13:07) Ole Miss – Akeem Judd 23 yard run (Gary Wunderlich kick)
  Ole Miss 7–0; 7 plays, 75 yards, 1:53
- (5:54) Alabama – Adam Griffith 32 yard field goal
  Ole Miss 7–3; 17 plays, 61 yards, 7:13

Second Quarter

- (7:43) Ole Miss – Gary Wunderlich 23 yard field goal
  Ole Miss 10–3; 5 plays, 50 yards, 1:37
- (4:40) Ole Miss – Evan Engram 63 yard pass from Chad Kelly (Gary Wunderlich kick)
  Ole Miss 17–3; 2 plays, 80 yards, 0:52
- (2:47) Ole Miss – John Youngblood 44 yard fumble return (Gary Wunderlich kick)
  Ole Miss 24–3
- (2:10) Alabama – Calvin Ridley 6 yard run (Adam Griffith kick)
  Ole Miss 24–10; 3 plays, 50 yards, 0:37
- (1:05) Alabama – Eddie Jackson 85 yard punt return (Adam Griffith kick)
  Ole Miss 24–17

Third Quarter

- (11:47) Alabama – Da'Ron Payne 3 yard fumble return
  Tied 24–24
- (6:03) Alabama – Adam Griffith 30 yard field goal
  Alabama 27–24; 10 plays, 51 yards, 4:24
- (1:47) Ole Miss – Gary Wunderlich 18 yard field goal
  Tied 27–27; 12 plays, 74 yards, 4:16
- (0:16) Alabama – Bo Scarborough 1 yard run (Adam Griffith kick)
  Alabama 34–27; 4 plays, 75 yards, 1:31

Fourth Quarter

- (13:17) Ole Miss – Gary Wunderlich 38 yard field goal
  Alabama 34–30; 7 plays, 54 yards, 1:59
- (7:33) Alabama – Damien Harris 1 yard run (Adam Griffith kick)
  Alabama 41–30; 5 plays, 58 yards, 2:03
- (6:03) Alabama – Jonathan Allen 75 yard fumble return (Adam Griffith kick)
  Alabama 48–30
- (2:59) Ole Miss – Damore'ea Stringfellow 5 yard pass from Chad Kelly
  Alabama 48–37; 12 plays, 78 yards, 2:29
- (2:51) Ole Miss – A.J. Brown 37 yard pass from Chad Kelly (Two-Point Pass Conversion Failed)
  Alabama 48–43; 1 play, 37 yards, 0:08

Statistics	ALA	MISS
First downs	22	23
Total yards	492	522
Rushes/yards	48/334	33/101
Passing yards	158	421
Passing: Comp–Att–Int	19–31–0	26–40–0
Time of possession	35:23	24:37

Team	Category	Player	Statistics
Alabama	Passing	Jalen Hurts	19/31, 158 yards
Alabama	Rushing	Jalen Hurts	18 carries, 146 yards
Alabama	Receiving	Calvin Ridley	8 receptions, 81 yards
Ole Miss	Passing	Chad Kelly	26/40, 421 yards, 3 TD
Ole Miss	Rushing	Akeem Judd	15 carries, 45 yards, 1 TD
Ole Miss	Receiving	Evan Engram	9 receptions, 138 yards, 1 TD

=== No. 12 Georgia ===
Uniform Combination
Helmet	Jersey	Pants

No. 12 Georgia Bulldogs (3–0) at No. 23 Ole Miss Rebels (1–2)

Quarter	1	2	3	4	Total
No. 12 Bulldogs	0	0	7	7	14
No. 23 Rebels	17	14	14	0	45

at Vaught–Hemingway Stadium • Oxford, MS

- Date: Saturday, September 24, 2016
- Game time: 11:00 a.m. CST
- Game weather: Partly Cloudy • Temperature: 86 °F (30 °C)
- Game attendance: 65,843
- Referee: Ken Williamson
- TV announcers (ESPN):
  Dave Pasch (play-by-play)
  Greg McElroy (color)
  Tom Luginbill (sideline)

Game information

First Quarter

- (8:54) Ole Miss – Gary Wunderlich 24 yard field goal
  Ole Miss 3–0; 7 plays, 69 yards, 2:20
- (7:12) Ole Miss – Derrick Jones 52 yard interception return (Gary Wunderlich kick)
  Ole Miss 10–0
- (2:14) Ole Miss – D'Vaughn Pennamon 1 yard run (Gary Wunderlich kick)
  Ole Miss 17–0; 10 plays, 84 yards, 2:57

Second Quarter

- (10:24) Ole Miss – DaMarkus Lodge 55 yard pass from Chad Kelly (Gary Wunderlich kick)
  Ole Miss 24–0; 1 play, 55 yards, 0:10
- (1:36) Ole Miss – Evan Engram 9 yard pass from Chad Kelly (Gary Wunderlich kick)
  Ole Miss 31–0; 5 plays, 58 yards, 1:27

Third Quarter

- (13:13) Ole Miss – Eugene Brazley 5 yard pass from Jason Pellerin (Gary Wunderlich kick)
  Ole Miss 38–0; 7 plays, 70 yards, 1:47
- (8:34) Ole Miss – Chad Kelly 41 yard run (Gary Wunderlich kick)
  Ole Miss 45–0; 3 plays, 64 yards, 0:53
- (5:00) Georgia – Brian Herrien 10 yard run (Rodrigo Blankenship kick)
  Ole Miss 45–7; 7 plays, 75 yards, 3:34

Fourth Quarter

- (7:38) Georgia – Brian Herrien 10 yard run (Rodrigo Blankenship kick)
  Ole Miss 45–14; 12 plays, 79 yards, 5:54

Statistics	UGA	MISS
First downs	21	23
Total yards	396	510
Rushes/yards	44/230	31/180
Passing yards	166	330
Passing: Comp–Att–Int	17–37–1	21–30–1
Time of possession	35:48	24:12

Team	Category	Player	Statistics
Georgia	Passing	Jacob Eason	16/36, 137 yards, 1 INT
Georgia	Rushing	Brian Herrien	11 carries, 78 yards, 2 TD
Georgia	Receiving	Sony Michel	2 receptions, 34 yards
Ole Miss	Passing	Chad Kelly	18/24, 282 yards, 2 TD
Ole Miss	Rushing	Chad Kelly	4 carries, 53 yards, 1 TD
Ole Miss	Receiving	Evan Engram	6 receptions, 95 yards, 1 TD

=== Memphis ===
Uniform Combination
Helmet	Jersey	Pants

Memphis Tigers (3–0) at No. 16 Ole Miss Rebels (2–2)

Quarter	1	2	3	4	Total
Tigers	0	7	14	7	28
No. 16 Rebels	14	10	10	14	48

at Vaught–Hemingway Stadium • Oxford, MS

- Date: Saturday, October 1, 2016
- Game time: 6:00 p.m. CST
- Game weather: Partly Cloudy • Temperature: 72 °F (22 °C)
- Game attendance: 65,889
- Referee: Adam Savoie
- TV announcers (ESPN2):
  Anish Shroff (play-by-play)
  Ahmad Brooks (color)
  Dawn Davenport (sideline)

Game information

First Quarter

- (6:55) Ole Miss – Jason Pellerin 1 yard run (Gary Wunderlich kick)
  Ole Miss 7–0; 13 plays, 90 yards, 4:41
- (0:58) Ole Miss – Zedrick Woods 31 yard interception return (Gary Wunderlich kick)
  Ole Miss 14–0

Second Quarter

- (14:56) Memphis – Anthony Miller 7 yard run (Jake Elliott kick)
  Ole Miss 14–7; 4 plays, 64 yards, 1:02
- (12:22) Ole Miss – Gary Wunderlich 32 yard field goal
  Ole Miss 17–7; 9 plays, 60 yards, 2:34
- (1:25) Ole Miss – Jason Pellerin 3 yard run (Gary Wunderlich kick)
  Ole Miss 24–7; 8 plays, 30 yards, 3:23

Third Quarter

- (12:39) Ole Miss – Gary Wunderlich 23 yard field goal
  Ole Miss 27–7; 6 plays, 69 yards, 2:21
- (10:11) Memphis – Doroland Dorceus 11 yard run (Jake Elliott kick)
  Ole Miss 27–14; 7 plays, 75 yards, 2:28
- (3:36) Memphis – Riley Ferguson 1 yard run (Jake Elliott kick)
  Ole Miss 27–21; 13 plays, 99 yards, 5:01
- (1:53) Ole Miss – Evan Engram 12 yard pass from Chad Kelly (Gary Wunderlich kick)
  Ole Miss 34–21; 7 plays, 65 yards, 1:37

Fourth Quarter

- (14:53) Ole Miss – Eugene Brazley 6 yard run (Gary Wunderlich kick)
  Ole Miss 41–21; 3 plays, 35 yards, 0:42
- (8:41) Memphis – Riley Ferguson 2 yard run (Jake Elliott kick)
  Ole Miss 41–28; 8 plays, 80 yards, 2:58
- (5:00) Ole Miss – Eugene Brazley 32 yard run (Gary Wunderlich kick)
  Ole Miss 48–28; 9 plays, 85 yards, 3:41

Statistics	MEM	MISS
First downs	27	34
Total yards	396	510
Rushes/yards	31/119	44/263
Passing yards	355	361
Passing: Comp–Att–Int	31–47–3	30–44–1
Time of possession	27:47	32:13

Team	Category	Player	Statistics
Memphis	Passing	Riley Ferguson	30/46, 343 yards, 3 INT
Memphis	Rushing	Doroland Dorceus	14 carries, 72 yards, 1 TD
Memphis	Receiving	Anthony Miller	10 receptions, 132 yards
Ole Miss	Passing	Chad Kelly	30/44, 361 yards, 1 TD, 1 INT
Ole Miss	Rushing	Eugene Brazley	13 carries, 124 yards, 2 TD
Ole Miss	Receiving	Damore'ea Stringfellow	9 receptions, 64 yards

=== At No. 22 Arkansas ===
Uniform Combination
Helmet	Jersey	Pants

No. 12 Ole Miss Rebels (3–2) at No. 22 Arkansas Razorbacks (4–2)

Quarter	1	2	3	4	Total
No. 12 Rebels	6	14	0	10	30
No. 22 Razorbacks	14	6	7	7	34

at Donald W. Reynolds Razorback Stadium • Fayetteville, AR

- Date: Saturday, October 15, 2016
- Game time: 6:00 p.m. CST
- Game weather: Scattered • Temperature: 78 °F (26 °C)
- Game attendance: 73,786
- Referee: Marc Curles
- TV announcers (ESPN):
  Joe Tessitore (play-by-play)
  Todd Blackledge (color)
  Holly Rowe (sideline)

Game information

First Quarter

- (10:33) Arkansas – Dominique Reed 51 yard pass from Austin Allen (Adam McFain kick)
  Arkansas 7–0; 5 plays, 82 yards, 2:34
- (7:26) Ole Miss – Evan Engram 13 yard pass from Chad Kelly (Gary Wunderlich kick missed)
  Arkansas 7–6; 9 plays, 61 yards, 3:07
- (6:08) Arkansas – Drew Morgan 13 yard pass from Austin Allen (Adam McFain kick)
  Arkansas 14–6; 3 plays, 65 yards, 1:18

Second Quarter

- (14:13) Arkansas – Adam McFain 43 yard field goal
  Arkansas 17–6; 10 plays, 56 yards, 4:50
- (11:50) Ole Miss – Akeem Judd 2 yard run (Gary Wunderlich kick)
  Arkansas 17–13; 7 plays, 67 yards, 2:23
- (5:21) Arkansas – Adam McFain 36 yard field goal
  Arkansas 20–13; 13 plays, 73 yards, 6:29
- (1:24) Ole Miss – Chad Kelly 8 yard run (Gary Wunderlich kick)
  Tied 20–20; 5 plays, 90 yards, 0:48

Third Quarter

- (3:29) Arkansas – Rawleigh Williams III 2 yard pass from Austin Allen (Adam McFain kick)
  Arkansas 27–20; 10 plays, 38 yards, 5:17

Fourth Quarter

- (14:49) Ole Miss – Gary Wunderlich 33 yard field goal
  Arkansas 27–23; 12 plays, 59 yards, 3:40
- (9:00) Ole Miss – Chad Kelly 17 yard run (Gary Wunderlich kick)
  Ole Miss 30–27; 5 plays, 45 yards, 1:05
- (2:20) Arkansas – Jared Cornelius 6 yard run (Adam McFain kick)
  Arkansas 34–30; 10 plays, 56 yards, 4:39

Statistics	MISS	ARK
First downs	20	27
Total yards	403	429
Rushes/yards	31/150	51/200
Passing yards	253	229
Passing: Comp–Att–Int	18–39–1	19–32–1
Time of possession	19:22	40:38

Team	Category	Player	Statistics
Ole Miss	Passing	Chad Kelly	18/39, 253 yards, 1 TD, 1 INT
Ole Miss	Rushing	Chad Kelly	14 carries, 89 yards, 2 TD
Ole Miss	Receiving	Evan Engram	7 receptions, 111 yards, 1 TD
Arkansas	Passing	Austin Allen	19/32, 229 yards, 3 TD, 1 INT
Arkansas	Rushing	Rawleigh Williams	27 carries, 180 yards
Arkansas	Receiving	Drew Morgan	4 receptions, 34 yards, 1 TD

=== At No. 25 LSU ===
Uniform Combination
Helmet	Jersey	Pants

No. 23 Ole Miss Rebels (3–3) at No. 25 LSU Tigers (4–2)

Quarter	1	2	3	4	Total
No. 23 Rebels	10	11	0	0	21
No. 25 Tigers	7	14	10	7	38

at Tiger Stadium • Baton Rouge, LA

- Date: Saturday, October 22, 2016
- Game time: 8:00 p.m. CST
- Game weather: Clear Skies • Temperature: 57 °F (14 °C)
- Game attendance: 101,720
- Referee: Matt Loeffler
- TV announcers (ESPN):
  Brent Musburger (play-by-play)
  Jesse Palmer (color)
  Kaylee Hartung (sideline)

Game information

First Quarter

- (10:52) Ole Miss – Van Jefferson 15 yard pass from Chad Kelly (Gary Wunderlich kick)
  Ole Miss 7–0; 6 plays, 77 yards, 2:12
- (4:48) Ole Miss – Gary Wunderlich 46 yard field goal
  Ole Miss 10–0; 9 plays, 37 yards, 3:44
- (3:26) LSU – Leonard Fournette 59 yard run (Colby Delahoussaye kick)
  Ole Miss 10–7; 3 plays, 75 yards, 1:22

Second Quarter

- (11:13) LSU – D.J. Chark 40 yard pass from Danny Etling (Colby Delahoussaye kick)
  LSU 14–10; 7 plays, 97 yards, 2:46
- (7:11) Ole Miss – Gary Wunderlich 22 yard field goal
  LSU 14–13; 13 plays, 80 yards, 4:02
- (6:11) LSU – Leonard Fournette 76 yard run (Colby Delahoussaye kick)
  LSU 21–13; 2 plays, 84 yards, 1:00
- (0:11) Ole Miss – Akeem Judd 2 yard run (Chad Kelly Run for Two-Point Conversion)
  Tied 21–21; 3 plays, 9 yards, 0:52

Third Quarter

- (13:38) LSU – Leonard Fournette 78 yard run (Colby Delahoussaye kick)
  LSU 28–21; 1 play, 78 yards, 0:13
- (8:27) LSU – Colby Delahoussaye 44 yard field goal
  LSU 31–21; 8 plays, 36 yards, 3:18

Fourth Quarter

- (7:26) LSU – Derrius Guice 6 yard run (Colby Delahoussaye kick)
  LSU 38–21; 11 plays, 70 yards, 6:03

Statistics	MISS	LSU
First downs	19	20
Total yards	325	515
Rushes/yards	36/107	36/311
Passing yards	218	204
Passing: Comp–Att–Int	20–33–2	19–28–1
Time of possession	27:47	32:13

Team	Category	Player	Statistics
Ole Miss	Passing	Chad Kelly	20/33, 218 yards, 1 TD, 2 INT
Ole Miss	Rushing	Chad Kelly	12 carries, 56 yards
Ole Miss	Receiving	Damore'ea Stringfellow	4 receptions, 92 yards
LSU	Passing	Danny Etling	19/28, 204 yards, 1 TD, 1 INT
LSU	Rushing	Leonard Fournette	16 carries, 284 yards, 3 TD
LSU	Receiving	Malachi Dupre	5 receptions, 52 yards

=== No. 15 Auburn ===
Uniform Combination
Helmet	Jersey	Pants

No. 15 Auburn Tigers (5–2) at Ole Miss Rebels (3–4)

Quarter	1	2	3	4	Total
No. 15 Tigers	10	10	7	13	40
Rebels	13	9	7	0	29

at Vaught–Hemingway Stadium • Oxford, MS

- Date: Saturday, October 29, 2016
- Game time: 6:15 p.m. CST
- Game weather: Clear Skies • Temperature: 74 °F (23 °C)
- Game attendance: 65,927
- Referee: John McDaid
- TV announcers (SECN):
  Brent Musburger (play-by-play)
  Jesse Palmer (color)
  Kaylee Hartung (sideline)

Game information

First Quarter

- (11:12) Ole Miss – Evan Engram 15 yard pass from Chad Kelly (Gary Wunderlich kick blocked)
  Ole Miss 6–0; 12 plays, 78 yards, 3:48
- (7:27) Auburn – Kamryn Pettway 41 yard run (Daniel Carlson kick)
  Auburn 7–6; 10 plays, 90 yards, 3:40
- (5:36) Ole Miss – DaMarkus Lodge 26 yard pass from Chad Kelly (Gary Wunderlich kick)
  Ole Miss 13–7; 7 plays, 75 yards, 1:51
- (1:50) Auburn – Daniel Carlson 45 yard field goal
  Ole Miss 13–10; 11 plays, 47 yards, 3:46

Second Quarter

- (14:14) Ole Miss – Gary Wunderlich 20 yard field goal
  Ole Miss 16–10; 10 plays, 72 yards, 2:36
- (12:33) Auburn – Kerryon Johnson 1 yard run (Daniel Carlson kick)
  Auburn 17–16; 5 plays, 75 yards, 1:41
- (7:10) Ole Miss – Gary Wunderlich 49 yard field goal
  Ole Miss 19–17; 15 plays, 50 yards, 5:17
- (2:50) Auburn – Daniel Carlson 32 yard field goal
  Auburn 20–19; 10 plays, 60 yards, 4:20
- (0:05) Ole Miss – Gary Wunderlich 26 yard field goal
  Ole Miss 22–20; 12 plays, 66 yards, 2:45

Third Quarter

- (3:11) Auburn – Jalen Harris 15 yard pass from Sean White (Daniel Carlson kick)
  Auburn 27–22; 7 plays, 76 yards, 2:45
- (1:30) Ole Miss – Damore'ea Stringfellow 10 yard pass from Chad Kelly (Gary Wunderlich kick)
  Ole Miss 29–27; 7 plays, 75 yards, 1:41

Fourth Quarter

- (12:25) Auburn – Daniel Carlson 30 yard field goal
  Auburn 30–29; 10 plays, 63 yards, 4:05
- (8:13) Auburn – Daniel Carlson 47 yard field goal
  Auburn 33–29; 7 plays, 52 yards, 3:20
- (5:58) Auburn – Kerryon Johnson 3 yard run (Daniel Carlson kick)
  Auburn 40–29; 3 plays, 25 yards, 1:23

Statistics	AUB	MISS
First downs	26	32
Total yards	502	485
Rushes/yards	52/307	31/105
Passing yards	247	465
Passing: Comp–Att–Int	15–22–0	36–59–1
Time of possession	32:27	27:33

Team	Category	Player	Statistics
Auburn	Passing	Sean White	15/22, 247 yards, 1 TD
Auburn	Rushing	Kamryn Pettway	30 carries, 236 yards, 1 TD
Auburn	Receiving	Darius Slayton	3 receptions, 53 yards
Ole Miss	Passing	Chad Kelly	36/59, 465 yards, 3 TD, 1 INT
Ole Miss	Rushing	Chad Kelly	11 carries, 40 yards
Ole Miss	Receiving	Evan Engram	9 receptions, 95 yards, 1 TD

=== Georgia Southern ===
Uniform Combination
Helmet	Jersey	Pants

Georgia Southern Eagles (4–4) at Ole Miss Rebels (3–5)

Quarter	1	2	3	4	Total
Eagles	14	7	3	3	27
Rebels	3	28	3	3	37

at Vaught–Hemingway Stadium • Oxford, MS

- Date: Saturday, November 5, 2016
- Game time: 11:00 a.m. CST
- Game weather: Partly Cloudy • Temperature: 65 °F (18 °C)
- Game attendance: 60,263
- Referee: Matt Loeffler
- TV announcers (ESPNU):
  Eamon McAnaney (play-by-play)
  John Congemi (color)

Game information

First Quarter

- (9:01) Ole Miss – Gary Wunderlich 35 yard field goal
  Ole Miss 3–0; 7 plays, 33 yards, 1:59
- (5:08) Georgia Southern – Myles Campbell 29 yard pass from Kevin Ellison (Younghoe Koo kick)
  Georgia Southern 7–3; 8 plays, 69 yards, 3:53
- (0:59) Georgia Southern – Kevin Ellison 9 yard run (Younghoe Koo kick)
  Georgia Southern 14–3; 5 plays, 49 yards, 2:19

Second Quarter

- (11:38) Ole Miss – Chad Kelly 3 yard run (Gary Wunderlich kick)
  Georgia Southern 14–10; 7 plays, 71 yards, 1:48
- (10:13) Georgia Southern – Matt Breida 68 yard run (Younghoe Koo kick)
  Georgia Southern 21–10; 3 plays, 75 yards, 1:25
- (8:20) Ole Miss – Chad Kelly 5 yard run (Gary Wunderlich)
  Georgia Southern 21–17; 5 plays, 41 yards, 1:53
- (3:36) Ole Miss – Akeem Judd 9 yard run (Gary Wunderlich kick)
  Ole Miss 24–21; 7 plays, 56 yards, 1:26
- (2:06) Ole Miss – Evan Engram 38 yard pass from Chad Kelly (Gary Wunderlich kick)
  Ole Miss 31–21; 2 plays, 65 yards, 0:36

Third Quarter

- (3:02) Georgia Southern – Younghoe Koo 41 yard field goal
  Ole Miss 31–24; 13 plays, 70 yards, 6:15
- (0:13) Ole Miss – Gary Wunderlich 29 yard field goal
  Ole Miss 34–24; 9 plays, 63 yards, 2:49

Fourth Quarter

- (12:09) Georgia Southern – Younghoe Koo 38 yard field goal
  Ole Miss 34–27; 8 plays, 70 yards, 3:04
- (7:14) Ole Miss – Gary Wunderlich 38 yard field goal
  Ole Miss 37–27; 7 plays, 35 yards, 2:31

Statistics	GASO	MISS
First downs	19	25
Total yards	401	441
Rushes/yards	59/267	45/196
Passing yards	134	245
Passing: Comp–Att–Int	7–17–1	17–28–1
Time of possession	36:03	23:57

Team	Category	Player	Statistics
Georgia Southern	Passing	Kevin Ellison	7/16, 134 yards, 1 TD, 1 INT
Georgia Southern	Rushing	Matt Breida	22 carries, 100 yards, 1 TD
Georgia Southern	Receiving	Myles Campbell	4 receptions, 121 yards, 1 TD
Ole Miss	Passing	Chad Kelly	16/23, 226 yards, 1 TD
Ole Miss	Rushing	Akeem Judd	26 carries, 139 yards, 1 TD
Ole Miss	Receiving	Evan Engram	4 receptions, 75 yards, 1 TD

=== At No. 10 Texas A&M ===
Uniform Combination
Helmet	Jersey	Pants

Ole Miss Rebels (4–5) at No. 10 Texas A&M Aggies (7–2)

Quarter	1	2	3	4	Total
Rebels	3	3	0	23	29
No. 10 Aggies	7	14	0	7	28

at Kyle Field • College Station, TX

- Date: Saturday, November 12, 2016
- Game time: 6:30 p.m. CST
- Game weather: Partly Cloudy • Temperature: 70 °F (21 °C)
- Game attendance: 104,892
- Referee: Matt Austin
- TV announcers (SECN):
  Brent Musburger (play-by-play)
  Jesse Palmer (color)
  Kaylee Hartung (sideline)

Game information

First Quarter

- (5:23) Ole Miss – Gary Wunderlich 25 yard field goal
  Ole Miss 3–0; 14 plays, 57 yards, 5:27
- (4:49) Texas A&M – Keith Ford 6 yard run (Daniel LaCamera kick)
  Texas A&M 7–3; 2 plays, 75 yards, 0:34

Second Quarter

- (13:55) Texas A&M – Keith Ford 1 yard run (Daniel LaCamera kick)
  Texas A&M 14–3; 8 plays, 89 yards, 3:01
- (7:46) Ole Miss – Gary Wunderlich 24 yard field goal
  Texas A&M 14–6; 14 plays, 68 yards, 6:09
- (6:43) Texas A&M – Speedy Noil 1 yard pass from Jake Hubenak (Daniel LaCamera kick)
  Texas A&M 21–6; 3 plays, 7 yards, 1:03

Third Quarter

- No scoring plays

Fourth Quarter

- (14:50) Ole Miss – Damore'ea Stringfellow 6 yard pass from Shea Patterson (Gary Wunderlich kick)
  Texas A&M 21–13; 11 plays, 90 yards, 3:53
- (12:12) Ole Miss – Akeem Judd 21 yard run (Two-Point Pass Conversion Failed)
  Texas A&M 21–19; 3 plays, 61 yards, 0:27
- (6:41) Texas A&M – Josh Reynolds 13 yard pass from Jake Hubenak (Daniel LaCamera kick)
  Texas A&M 28–19; 11 plays, 76 yards, 5:31
- (5:17) Ole Miss – Van Jefferson 32 yard pass from Shea Patterson (Gary Wunderlich kick)
  Texas A&M 28–26; 6 plays, 75 yards, 1:24
- (0:37) Ole Miss – Gary Wunderlich 39 yard field goal
  Ole Miss 29–28; 9 plays, 36 yards, 3:07

Statistics	MISS	TA&M
First downs	30	13
Total yards	490	342
Rushes/yards	47/152	34/129
Passing yards	338	213
Passing: Comp–Att–Int	25–42–1	16–28–1
Time of possession	33:03	26:57

Team	Category	Player	Statistics
Ole Miss	Passing	Shea Patterson	25/42, 338 yards, 2 TD, 1 INT
Ole Miss	Rushing	Akeem Judd	20 carries, 100 yards, 1 TD
Ole Miss	Receiving	A.J. Brown	4 receptions, 77 yards
Texas A&M	Passing	Jake Hubenak	16/27, 213 yards, 2 TD, 1 INT
Texas A&M	Rushing	Trayveon Williams	17 carries, 72 yards
Texas A&M	Receiving	Josh Reynolds	4 receptions, 70 yards, 1 TD

=== At Vanderbilt ===
Uniform Combination
Helmet	Jersey	Pants

Ole Miss Rebels (5–5) at Vanderbilt Commodores (4–6)

Quarter	1	2	3	4	Total
Rebels	10	0	0	7	17
Commodores	7	7	17	7	38

at Vanderbilt Stadium • Nashville, TN

- Date: Saturday, November 19, 2016
- Game time: 7:00 p.m. CST (8:00 p.m. local EST)
- Game weather: Clear Skies • Temperature: 44 °F (7 °C)
- Game attendance: 27,763
- Referee: John McDaid
- TV announcers (SECN):
  Drew Carter (play-by-play)
  Matt Stinchcomb (color)
  Alyssa Lang (sideline)

Game information

First Quarter

- (10:51) Ole Miss – Gary Wunderlich 23 yard field goal
  Ole Miss 3–0; 9 plays, 75 yards, 4:09
- (6:51) Ole Miss – Akeem Judd 21 yard pass from Shea Patterson (Gary Wunderlich kick)
  Ole Miss 10–0; 1 play, 21 yards, 0:11
- (0:30) Vanderbilt – Ralph Webb 4 yard run (Tommy Openshaw kick)
  Ole Miss 10–7; 2 plays, 76 yards, 0:46

Second Quarter

- (13:35) Vanderbilt – Trent Sherfield 5 yard pass from Kyle Shurmur (Tommy Openshaw kick)
  Vanderbilt 14–10; 7 plays, 72 yards, 3:13

Third Quarter

- (10:48) Vanderbilt – Ralph Webb 11 yard run (Tommy Openshaw kick)
  Vanderbilt 21–10; 7 plays, 72 yards, 3:13
- (8:03) Vanderbilt – Tommy Openshaw 24 yard field goal
  Vanderbilt 24–10; 5 plays, 21 yards, 1:34
- (2:11) Vanderbilt – Ralph Webb 1 yard run (Tommy Openshaw kick)
  Vanderbilt 31–10; 11 plays, 72 yards, 5:26

Fourth Quarter

- (14:44) Ole Miss – Evan Engram 38 yard pass from Shea Patterson (Gary Wunderlich kick)
  Vanderbilt 31–17; 9 plays, 65 yards, 2:20
- (8:36) Vanderbilt – Bailey McElwain 3 yard pass from Kyle Shurmur (Tommy Openshaw kick)
  Vanderbilt 38–17; 8 plays, 72 yards, 3:45

Statistics	MISS	VAN
First downs	18	22
Total yards	363	481
Rushes/yards	27/90	46/208
Passing yards	273	273
Passing: Comp–Att–Int	26–51–0	17–30–0
Time of possession	25:11	34:49

Team	Category	Player	Statistics
Ole Miss	Passing	Shea Patterson	20/42, 222 yards, 2 TD
Ole Miss	Rushing	Akeem Judd	10 carries, 63 yards
Ole Miss	Receiving	Evan Engram	6 receptions, 102 yards, 1 TD
Vanderbilt	Passing	Kyle Shurmur	17/30, 273 yards, 2 TD
Vanderbilt	Rushing	Ralph Webb	20 carries, 123 yards, 3 TD
Vanderbilt	Receiving	Trent Sherfield	2 receptions, 72 yards, 1 TD

=== Mississippi State ===
Uniform Combination
Helmet	Jersey	Pants

Mississippi State Bulldogs (4–7) at Ole Miss Rebels (5–6)

Quarter	1	2	3	4	Total
Bulldogs	13	14	14	14	55
Rebels	10	10	0	0	20

at Vaught–Hemingway Stadium • Oxford, MS

- Date: Saturday, November 26, 2022
- Game time: 2:30 p.m. CST
- Game weather: Sunny • Temperature: 55 °F (13 °C)
- Game attendance: 66,038
- Referee: James Carter
- TV announcers (SECN):
  Brent Musburger (play-by-play)
  Jesse Palmer (color)
  Kaylee Hartung (sideline)

Game information

First Quarter

- (7:43) Ole Miss – Gary Wunderlich 24 yard field goal
  Ole Miss 3–0; 11 plays, 75 yards, 5:33
- (5:48) Mississippi State – Aeris Williams 16 yard run (Westin Graves kick missed)
  Mississippi State 6–3; 5 plays, 63 yards, 1:48
- (3:56) Ole Miss – Damore'ea Stringfellow 19 yard pass from Shea Patterson (Gary Wunderlich kick)
  Ole Miss 10–6; 5 plays, 75 yards, 1:52
- (2:33) Mississippi State – Donald Gray 8 yard pass from Nick Fitzgerald (Westin Graves kick)
  Mississippi State 13–10; 4 plays, 80 yards, 1:15

Second Quarter

- (12:55) Mississippi State – Aeris Williams 13 yard run (Westin Graves kick)
  Mississippi State 20–10; 7 plays, 67 yards, 2:49
- (9:13) Mississippi State – Malik Dear 24 yard pass from Nick Fitzgerald (Westin Graves kick)
  Mississippi State 27–10; 6 plays, 80 yards, 2:10
- (4:47) Ole Miss – Damore'ea Stringfellow 25 yard pass from Shea Patterson (Gary Wunderlich kick)
  Mississippi State 27–17; 12 plays, 84 yards, 4:17
- (0:26) Ole Miss – Gary Wunderlich 38 yard field goal
  Mississippi State 27–20; 11 plays, 57 yards, 2:23

Third Quarter

- (5:22) Mississippi State – Fred Ross 38 yard pass from Nick Fitzgerald (Westin Graves kick)
  Mississippi State 34–20; 9 plays, 82 yards, 4:27
- (2:57) Mississippi State – Nick Fitzgerald 61 yard run (Westin Graves kick)
  Mississippi State 41–20; 3 plays, 69 yards, 0:48

Fourth Quarter

- (5:09) Mississippi State – Nick Fitzgerald 30 yard run (Westin Graves kick)
  Mississippi State 48–20; 11 plays, 55 yards, 6:47
- (7:58) Mississippi State – Cedric Jiles 74 yard interception return (Westin Graves kick)
  Mississippi State 55–20

Statistics	MSST	MISS
First downs	23	31
Total yards	566	528
Rushes/yards	47/457	38/208
Passing yards	109	320
Passing: Comp–Att–Int	8–17–0	27–48–2
Time of possession	28:37	31:23

Team	Category	Player	Statistics
Mississippi State	Passing	Nick Fitzgerald	8/17, 109 yards, 3 TD
Mississippi State	Rushing	Nick Fitzgerald	14 carries, 258 yards, 2 TD
Mississippi State	Receiving	Fred Ross	1 reception, 38 yards, 1 TD
Ole Miss	Passing	Shea Patterson	27/48, 320 yards, 2 TD, 2 INT
Ole Miss	Rushing	Akeem Judd	19 carries, 107 yards
Ole Miss	Receiving	Damore'ea Stringfellow	6 receptions, 97 yards, 2 TD

== Cumulative Season Statistics ==
=== Cumulative Team Statistics ===
Category	Ole Miss	Opponents
First downs - Avg. per game	298 - 24.83	270 - 22.5
Points - Avg. per game	391 - 32.58	408 - 34
Total plays/yards - Avg. per game	905/5572 (6.16 yards/play) - 75.42/464.33	896/5535 (6.18 yards/play) - 74.67/461.25
Passing yards - Avg. per game	3779 - 314.92	2579 - 214.92
Rushes/yards (net) - Avg. per game	422/1793 - 35.17/149.42 (4.25 yards/carry)	546/2956 - 45.5/246.33 (5.41 yards/carry)
Passing (Att-Comp-Int)	483-289-14 (59.83% completion)	350-206-8 (58.86% completion)
Sacks - Avg. per game	20 - 1.67	26 - 2.17
Penalties/yards - Avg. per game	59/520 - 4.92/43.33	82/691 - 6.83/57.58
3rd down conversions	68–169 (40.24%)	75–180 (41.67%)
4th down conversions	6–16 (37.5%)	9–14 (64.29%)
Time of possession - Avg. per game	5:11:13 - 25:56	6:48:47 - 34:04

=== Cumulative Player Statistics ===
Category	Player	Statistics - Avg. per game
Leading Passer	Chad Kelly	205/328 (62.5% completion), 2758 yards, 19 TD, 8 INT - 20.5/32.8, 275.8 yards, 1.9 TD, 0.8 INT
Leading Rusher	Akeem Judd	164 carries, 826 yards, 6 TD - 13.67 carries, 68.83 yards (5.04 yards/carry), 0.5 TD
Leading Receiver	Evan Engram	65 receptions, 926 yards, 8 TD - 5.42 receptions, 77.17 yards, 0.67 TD

== Rankings ==
Ranking movements Legend: ██ Increase in ranking ██ Decrease in ranking — = Not ranked RV = Received votes
	Week															
Poll	Pre	1	2	3	4	5	6	7	8	9	10	11	12	13	14	Final
AP	11	19	19	23	16	14	12	23	—	—	—	RV	—	—	—	—
Coaches	12	18	17	22	17	14	13	22	RV	RV	—	—	—	—	—	—
CFP	Not released									—	—	—	—	—	—	Not released
