= 2016 SEC Championship Game =

- Conference Championship
- 2016 SEC Championship logo.
Alabama Crimson Tide	Florida Gators
(12–0)	(8–3)
54	16
Head coach: Nick Saban	Head coach: Jim McElwain
AP / Coaches / CFP; 1 / 1 / 1	AP / Coaches / CFP; 15 / 16 / 15
	1	2	3	4	Total
Alabama	16	17	7	14	54
Florida	9	7	0	0	16
- Date: December 3, 2016
- Season: 2016
- Stadium: Georgia Dome
- Location: Atlanta, Georgia
- MVP: Reuben Foster
- Favorite: Alabama by 24
- Referee: Matt Loeffler
- Halftime show: Dr Pepper Tuition Givaway
- Attendance: 74,632

United States TV coverage
- Network: CBS, Westwood One, SEC Radio
- Announcers: CBS: Verne Lundquist (play-by-play); Gary Danielson (color); Allie LaForce (sidelines); Westwood One: Brandon Gaudin, Derek Rackley, and Ross Tucker; SEC Radio: Dave Neal, Dave Archer, and Dave Baker

2016 Southeastern Conference football standings
	Conf.			Overall
Team	W		L	W		L
Eastern Division
No. 14 Florida x	6	–	2	9	–	4
No. 22 Tennessee	4	–	4	9	–	4
Georgia	4	–	4	8	–	5
Kentucky	4	–	4	7	–	6
South Carolina	3	–	5	6	–	7
Vanderbilt	3	–	5	6	–	7
Missouri*	2	–	6	4	–	8
Western Division
No. 2 Alabama x$^	8	–	0	14	–	1
No. 24 Auburn	5	–	3	8	–	5
No. 13 LSU	5	–	3	8	–	4
Texas A&M	4	–	4	8	–	5
Arkansas	3	–	5	7	–	6
Mississippi State	3	–	5	6	–	7
Ole Miss*	2	–	6	5	–	7
Championship: Alabama 54, Florida 16
^ – College Football Playoff participant; $ – Conference champion; x – Division champion/co-champions; * Ole Miss and Missouri vacated all wins due to NCAA violations.; Rankings from AP Poll

The 2016 SEC Championship Game was played on Saturday, December 3, 2016, in the Georgia Dome in Atlanta, and determined the 2016 football champion of the Southeastern Conference (SEC). The game was played between the Eastern Division champion, Gators, and Western Division champion Alabama. The Eastern Division team was the designated home team, and the game was broadcast nationally by CBS for the 16th consecutive year. This was the final SEC Championship Game in the Georgia Dome, which was demolished on November 20, 2017, after its successor, Mercedes-Benz Stadium, opened on August 26 of the same year. The title game moved to the new stadium and will remain there through at least 2027.

Alabama earned a berth in the SEC Championship on November 12 after clinching the SEC West.

== 2015 season ==
In the 2015 SEC Championship Game, Alabama defeated Florida 29–15. Alabama went on to defeat Michigan State 38–0 in the Cotton Bowl, which served as a College Football Playoff semifinal, and defeated Clemson 45–40 in the national championship game.

=== Verne Lundquist retiring ===
This would be Verne Lundquist's final SEC Championship Game broadcast. He retired from calling college football following the Army-Navy Game. He was succeeded by Brad Nessler.

== Game summary ==
Scoring summary

Quarter	Time	Drive			Team	Scoring information	Score	
Quarter	Time	Plays	Yards	TOP	Team	Scoring information	ALA	FLA
1	9:51	10	64	5:09	FLA	Antonio Callaway 5-yard touchdown reception from Austin Appleby, Eddy Piñeiro kick good	0	7
1	6:58	4	–1	0:58	ALA	31-yard field goal by Adam Griffith	3	7
1	5:06	3	2	1:52	ALA	Interception returned 44 yards for touchdown by Minkah Fitzpatrick, Adam Griffith kick good	10	7
1	1:42	–	–	–	ALA	Joshua Jacobs 27 yard blocked punt return, Adam Griffith kick blocked	16	7
1	1:42	–	–	–	FLA	David Reese defensive PAT conversion	16	9
2	11:55	7	88	2:58	ALA	Gehrig Dieter 6-yard touchdown reception from Jalen Hurts, Adam Griffith kick good	23	9
2	6:27	7	36	2:01	ALA	25-yard field goal by Adam Griffith	26	9
2	3:47	5	62	1:43	ALA	Joshua Jacobs 6-yard touchdown run, Adam Griffith kick good	33	9
2	0:19	10	92	3:28	FLA	DeAndre Goolsby 25-yard touchdown reception from Austin Appleby, Eddy Piñeiro kick good	33	16
3	3:32	8	98	3:16	ALA	Bo Scarbrough 2-yard touchdown run, Adam Griffith kick good	40	16
4	9:15	15	91	7:34	ALA	Bo Scarbrough 1-yard touchdown run, Adam Griffith kick good	47	16
4	3:48	4	21	2:24	ALA	Derrick Gore 10-yard touchdown run, Andy Pappanastos kick good	54	16
"TOP" = time of possession. For other American football terms, see Glossary of American football.							54	16

=== Statistics ===
Statistics	ALA	FLA
First downs	18	16
Total offense	372	261
Rushing yards–TD	234–4	0–0
Passing yards–TD	138–1	261–2
Passing: Comp–Att–Int	11–20–0	26–39–3
Fumbles: Number–Lost	1–0	1–0
Penalties: Number–Yards	2–14	7–53
Punts: Average Yardage	40.5	43.6
Kickoffs: Average Yardage		
Sacks: Number–Yards	4–23	2–11
Field Goals: Good–Att	2–3	0–0
Points off turnovers	17	0
Time of Possession	24:52	35:08
