= Luke Del Rio =

American football player and coach (born 1994)

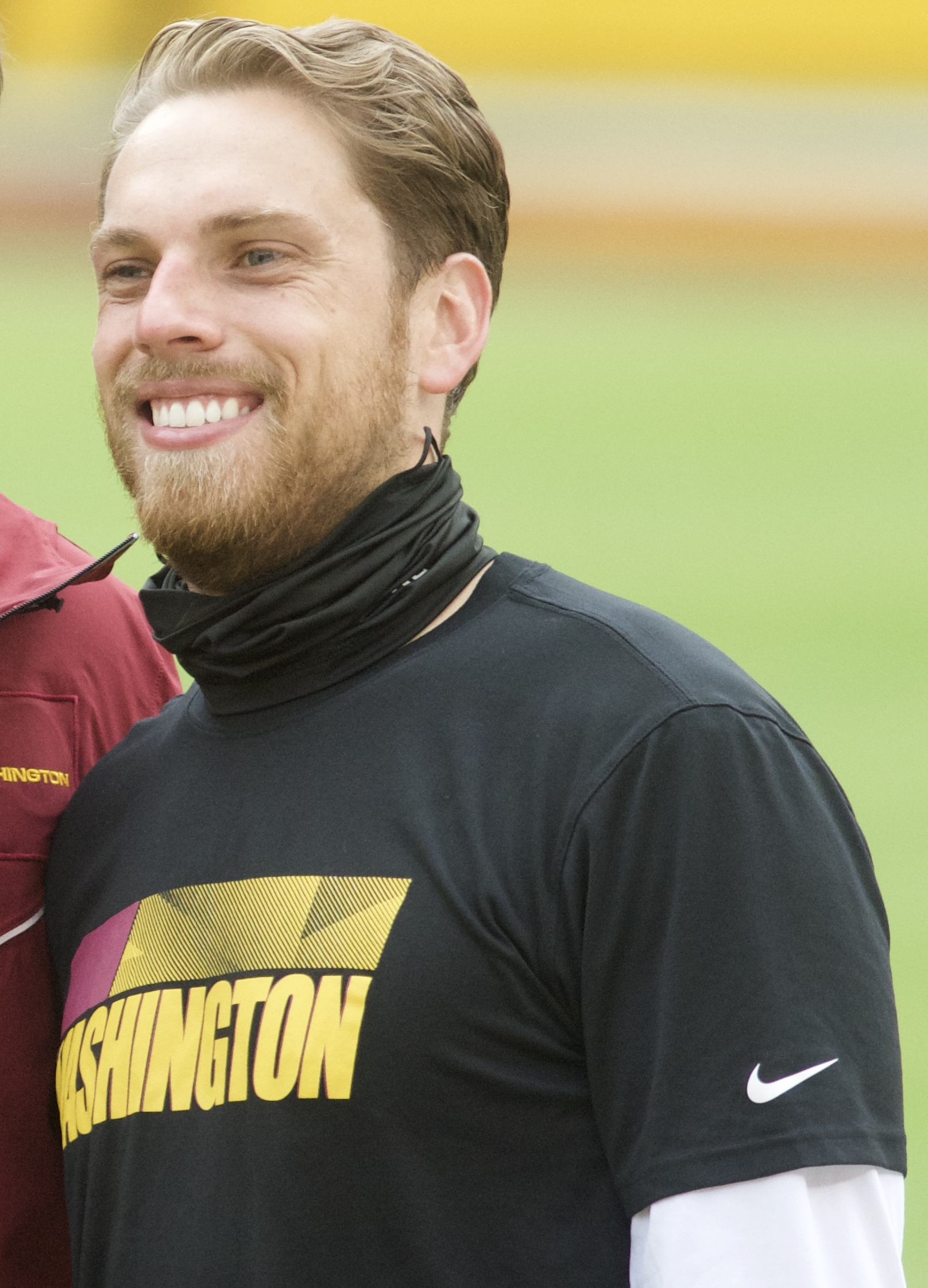
- Del Rio with the Washington Football Team in 2020

Current position
- Title: Offensive quality control coach
- Team: Washington
- Conference: Big Ten

Biographical details
- Born: November 6, 1994 (age 32); Minneapolis, Minnesota, U.S.

Playing career
- 2013: Alabama
- 2014: Oregon State
- 2015–2017: Florida
- Position: Quarterback

Coaching career (HC unless noted)
- 2019: Santa Margarita Catholic HS (TE)
- 2020–2021: Washington Football Team (OQC)
- 2022–2023: Washington Commanders (Asst. QB/OQC)
- 2024: Washington (OA)
- 2025: Paris Musketeers (OC)
- 2025–present: Washington (OQC)

Luke Del Rio (born November 6, 1994) is an American football coach and former quarterback who is an offensive quality control coach for the Washington Huskies. He played college football at Alabama, Oregon State, and Florida. Del Rio is the son of former NFL player and coach Jack Del Rio and worked under him with the NFL's Washington Football Team / Commanders, and with the Paris Musketeers in the 2025 ELF season.

== Early years ==
The son of Jack Del Rio, Luke was born in Minneapolis, Minnesota, on November 6, 1994. He attended Episcopal School of Jacksonville in Jacksonville, Florida, while his father was the head coach of the Jacksonville Jaguars, and transferred to Valor Christian High School in Highlands Ranch, Colorado, for his senior year after his father was hired by the Denver Broncos in 2012. Del Rio passed for 2,275 yards with 28 touchdowns in his senior year.

== College career ==
=== Alabama ===
Del Rio joined the University of Alabama as a walk-on in 2013.

=== Oregon State ===
After redshirting that season, Del Rio transferred to Oregon State University for 2014. He appeared in three games that season as a backup to Sean Mannion, completing 8 of 18 passes for 141 yards.

=== Florida ===
After the season, Del Rio transferred to the University of Florida. According to a university spokesperson, Del Rio was granted an extra year of eligibility by the NCAA in 2015. The extra year made him a redshirt sophomore for the 2016 season.

After sitting out 2015 due to transfer rules, Del Rio was named the starting quarterback for Florida in 2016. In the third game of the year against North Texas, Del Rio suffered a knee injury on a blindside hit, which forced Del Rio to miss the next two games. He had also suffered an AC joint sprain in his throwing shoulder earlier in the North Texas game, which hampered his play when he returned from injury. Del Rio returned from injury to play against Missouri on October 15. A week later in a game against Georgia, he suffered a torn labrum in his non-throwing shoulder. After struggling in a 31–10 loss against Arkansas on November 5, Del Rio was finally shutdown for the season due to injuries. After undergoing surgery on both shoulders, he was sidelined for all of spring practice in 2017.

Del Rio began the 2017 season behind starter Feleipe Franks and top backup Malik Zaire. With the offense struggling against Kentucky, Del Rio came off the bench and led the Gators to a comeback victory. As a result, Del Rio was named the starting quarterback the following week against Vanderbilt. In the second quarter, Del Rio suffered a broken collarbone and was ruled out for the rest of the season. In November 2017, Del Rio announced that he would be forgoing his sixth and final year of eligibility.

=== Statistics ===
Year	Team	Games		Passing								Rushing			
Year	Team	GP	Record	Comp	Att	Pct	Yards	Avg	TD	Int	Rate	Att	Yards	Avg	TD
2013	Alabama	1	0–0	0	0	0.0	0	0.0	0	0	0.0	0	0	0.0	0
2014	Oregon State	3	0–0	8	18	44.4	141	7.8	0	0	110.2	0	0	0.0	0
2015	Florida	DNP													
2016	Florida	6	5–1	114	201	56.7	1,358	6.8	8	8	118.6	18	-52	-2.9	0
2017	Florida	2	0–0	16	25	64.0	138	5.5	1	1	115.6	2	-9	-4.5	0
Career		12	5−1	138	244	56.6	1,637	6.7	9	9	117.7	18	-52	-2.9	0

== Coaching career ==
In 2019, Del Rio coached tight ends at Santa Margarita Catholic High School. In January 2020, Del Rio joined the Washington Football Team to be their offensive quality control coach. The move united him with his father Jack, who had joined the team as their defensive coordinator that season. He was promoted to assistant quarterbacks coach in 2022. Del Rio was not retained by the team following the hiring of new head coach, Dan Quinn, in the 2024 offseason. In February 2024, Del Rio was hired by the University of Washington as an offensive analyst under head coach, Jedd Fisch.

In February 2025, he followed his father to the French team Paris Musketeers, where he became Offensive Coordinator.

At the conclusion of the Musketeers' season, he returned to Washington as an offensive analyst.
