= 2016 Missouri Tigers football team =

American college football season

2016 Missouri Tigers football
- Conference: Southeastern Conference
- Eastern Division
- Record: 0–8, 4 wins vacated (0–6 SEC, 2 wins vacated)
- Head coach: Barry Odom (1st season)
- Offensive coordinator: Josh Heupel (1st season)
- Offensive scheme: Veer and shoot
- Defensive coordinator: DeMontie Cross (1st season)
- Co-defensive coordinator: Ryan Walters (1st season)
- Base defense: 4–3
- Home stadium: Faurot Field

2016 Southeastern Conference football standings
| | Conf. | | | Overall |
| Team | W | | L | W | | L |
|---|---|---|---|---|---|---|
Eastern Division
| No. 14 Florida x | 6 | – | 2 | 9 | – | 4 |
| No. 22 Tennessee | 4 | – | 4 | 9 | – | 4 |
| Georgia | 4 | – | 4 | 8 | – | 5 |
| Kentucky | 4 | – | 4 | 7 | – | 6 |
| South Carolina | 3 | – | 5 | 6 | – | 7 |
| Vanderbilt | 3 | – | 5 | 6 | – | 7 |
| Missouri* | 2 | – | 6 | 4 | – | 8 |
Western Division
| No. 2 Alabama x$^ | 8 | – | 0 | 14 | – | 1 |
| No. 24 Auburn | 5 | – | 3 | 8 | – | 5 |
| No. 13 LSU | 5 | – | 3 | 8 | – | 4 |
| Texas A&M | 4 | – | 4 | 8 | – | 5 |
| Arkansas | 3 | – | 5 | 7 | – | 6 |
| Mississippi State | 3 | – | 5 | 6 | – | 7 |
| Ole Miss* | 2 | – | 6 | 5 | – | 7 |
Championship: Alabama 54, Florida 16
^ – College Football Playoff participant; $ – Conference champion; x – Division champion/co-champions; * Ole Miss and Missouri vacated all wins due to NCAA violations.; Rankings from AP Poll

The 2016 Missouri Tigers football team (also called "Mizzou") represented the University of Missouri in the 2016 NCAA Division I FBS football season. The Tigers played their home games at Faurot Field in Columbia, Missouri, and competed in the Eastern Division of the Southeastern Conference (SEC). They were led by first-year head coach Barry Odom. They finished the season 4–8, 2–6 in SEC play to finish in last place in the East Division.

Due to National Collegiate Athletic Association (NCAA) action, all of Missouri's wins for the 2015 and 2016 seasons were vacated.

== Schedule ==
Missouri announced its 2016 football schedule on October 29, 2015. The 2016 schedule consisted of 7 home and 5 away games in the regular season. The Tigers hosted SEC foes Arkansas, Georgia, Kentucky, and Vanderbilt, and travelled to Florida, LSU, South Carolina, and Tennessee.

The Tigers hosted three of its four of its non–conference games which were against Delaware State Hornets from the FCS Mid-Eastern Athletic Conference, Eastern Michigan Eagles from the Mid-American Conference, and Middle Tennessee from Conference USA. The Tigers played the West Virginia Mountaineers from the Big 12 Conference as an away game.

| Date | Time | Opponent | Site | TV | Result | Attendance |
|---|---|---|---|---|---|---|
| September 3 | 11:00 a.m. | at West Virginia* | Mountaineer Field; Morgantown, WV | FS1 | L 11–26 | 60,125 |
| September 10 | 6:30 p.m. | Eastern Michigan* | Faurot Field; Columbia, MO | SECN | W 61–21 (vacated) | 51,192 |
| September 17 | 6:30 p.m. | No. 16 Georgia | Faurot Field; Columbia, MO | SECN | L 27–28 | 57,098 |
| September 24 | 3:00 p.m. | Delaware State* | Faurot Field; Columbia, MO | SECN | W 79–0 (vacated) | 53,472 |
| October 1 | 6:30 p.m. | at LSU | Tiger Stadium; Baton Rouge, LA | SECN | L 7–42 | 102,071 |
| October 15 | 3:00 p.m. | at No. 18 Florida | Ben Hill Griffin Stadium; Gainesville, FL | SECN | L 14–40 | 88,825 |
| October 22 | 3:00 p.m. | Middle Tennessee*^{†} | Faurot Field; Columbia, MO | SECN | L 45–51 | 52,351 |
| October 29 | 11:00 a.m. | Kentucky | Faurot Field; Columbia, MO | SECN | L 21–35 | 50,234 |
| November 5 | 3:00 p.m. | at South Carolina | Williams-Brice Stadium; Columbia, SC | SECN | L 21–31 | 73,817 |
| November 12 | 2:30 p.m. | Vanderbilt | Faurot Field; Columbia, MO | SECN | W 26–17 (vacated) | 50,261 |
| November 19 | 2:30 p.m. | at Tennessee | Neyland Stadium; Knoxville, TN | CBS | L 37–63 | 101,012 |
| November 25 | 1:30 p.m. | Arkansas | Faurot Field; Columbia, MO (Battle Line Rivalry) | CBS | W 28–24 (vacated) | 51,043 |
*Non-conference game; ^{†}Homecoming; Rankings from AP Poll released prior to game; All times are in Central time

Schedule source:

== Game summaries ==
=== At West Virginia ===
| | 1 | 2 | 3 | 4 | Total |
|---|---|---|---|---|---|
| Tigers | 0 | 3 | 0 | 8 | 11 |
| Mountaineers | 10 | 3 | 10 | 3 | 26 |

=== Eastern Michigan ===
| | 1 | 2 | 3 | 4 | Total |
|---|---|---|---|---|---|
| Eagles | 0 | 7 | 14 | 0 | 21 |
| Tigers | 14 | 19 | 14 | 14 | 61 |

=== Georgia ===
| | 1 | 2 | 3 | 4 | Total |
|---|---|---|---|---|---|
| #16 Bulldogs | 7 | 14 | 0 | 7 | 28 |
| Tigers | 10 | 10 | 7 | 0 | 27 |

=== Delaware State ===
| | 1 | 2 | 3 | 4 | Total |
|---|---|---|---|---|---|
| Hornets | 0 | 0 | 0 | 0 | 0 |
| Tigers | 30 | 28 | 14 | 7 | 79 |

=== At LSU ===
| | 1 | 2 | 3 | 4 | Total |
|---|---|---|---|---|---|
| MIZ Tigers | 0 | 0 | 0 | 7 | 7 |
| LSU Tigers | 7 | 14 | 7 | 14 | 42 |

=== At Florida ===
| | 1 | 2 | 3 | 4 | Total |
|---|---|---|---|---|---|
| Tigers | 0 | 0 | 7 | 7 | 14 |
| #18 Gators | 0 | 20 | 6 | 14 | 40 |

=== Middle Tennessee ===
| | 1 | 2 | 3 | 4 | Total |
|---|---|---|---|---|---|
| Blue Raiders | 13 | 21 | 7 | 10 | 51 |
| Tigers | 14 | 14 | 7 | 10 | 45 |

=== Kentucky ===
| | 1 | 2 | 3 | 4 | Total |
|---|---|---|---|---|---|
| Wildcats | 7 | 14 | 7 | 7 | 35 |
| Tigers | 0 | 7 | 0 | 14 | 21 |

=== At South Carolina ===
| | 1 | 2 | 3 | 4 | Total |
|---|---|---|---|---|---|
| Tigers | 0 | 14 | 7 | 0 | 21 |
| Gamecocks | 7 | 14 | 7 | 3 | 31 |

=== Vanderbilt ===
| | 1 | 2 | 3 | 4 | Total |
|---|---|---|---|---|---|
| Commodores | 0 | 10 | 7 | 0 | 17 |
| Tigers | 6 | 13 | 0 | 7 | 26 |

=== At Tennessee ===
| | 1 | 2 | 3 | 4 | Total |
|---|---|---|---|---|---|
| Tigers | 6 | 14 | 7 | 10 | 37 |
| Volunteers | 7 | 14 | 14 | 28 | 63 |

=== Arkansas ===
| | 1 | 2 | 3 | 4 | Total |
|---|---|---|---|---|---|
| Razorbacks | 14 | 10 | 0 | 0 | 24 |
| Tigers | 7 | 0 | 14 | 7 | 28 |
