= Marcell Harris =

American football player (born 1994)

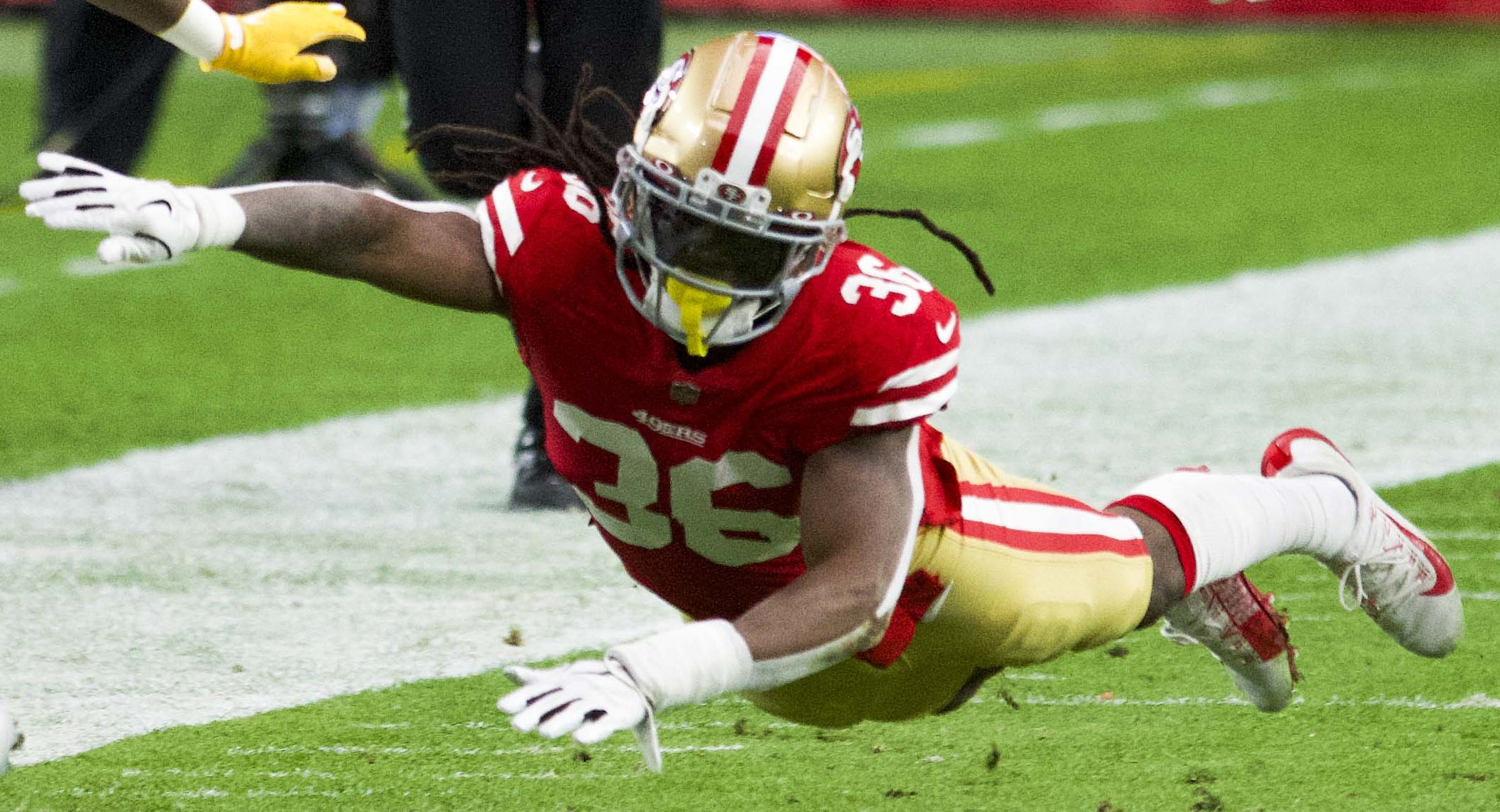
- Harris with the San Francisco 49ers in 2020

No. 36
- Position: Linebacker

Personal information
- Born: June 9, 1994 (age 32); Orlando, Florida, U.S.
- Listed height: 6 ft 0 in (1.83 m)
- Listed weight: 208 lb (94 kg)

Career information
- High school: Dr. Phillips (Orlando)
- College: Florida (2014–2017)
- NFL draft: 2018: 6th round, 184th overall pick

Career history
- San Francisco 49ers (2018–2021); New York Jets (2022); Houston Texans (2023)*
- * Offseason or practice squad member only

Career NFL statistics
- Total tackles: 167
- Sacks: 1.0
- Forced fumbles: 5
- Fumble recoveries: 3
- Interceptions: 1
- Pass deflections: 9
- Stats at Pro Football Reference

Marcell Harris (born June 9, 1994) is an American former professional football player who was a linebacker in the National Football League (NFL). He played college football for the Florida Gators.

== College career ==
Harris played college football for the Florida Gators. Harris had 102 tackles and two interceptions between 2014 and 2016. Due to a torn Achilles tendon, he missed the 2017 season.

== Professional career ==
Pre-draft measurables
Height	Weight	Arm length	Hand span	Bench press
6 ft 0 3/4 in (1.85 m)	216 lb (98 kg)	32 in (0.81 m)	8 5/8 in (0.22 m)	16 reps
All values from NFL Combine

=== San Francisco 49ers ===
Harris was selected by the San Francisco 49ers in the sixth round (184th overall) of the 2018 NFL draft. On September 3, 2018, Harris was placed on injured reserve. He was activated off injured reserve to the active roster on November 1, 2018. In Week 16 against the Chicago Bears, Harris made a late hit on Mitchell Trubisky. As a result, he was fined $10,026 six days later.

On August 31, 2019, Harris was waived by the 49ers and was signed to the practice squad the next day. He was promoted to the active roster on October 3, 2019.

During Week 13 against the Baltimore Ravens, Harris forced a fumble on quarterback Lamar Jackson and recovered the football during a narrow 20–17 road loss. The 49ers reached Super Bowl LIV, but lost 31–20 to the Kansas City Chiefs.

Harris signed a one-year contract extension with the 49ers on March 5, 2021.

At the beginning of the 2021 NFL season, it was reported that Harris was making the switch from strong safety to linebacker.

=== New York Jets ===
On April 25, 2022, Harris signed with the New York Jets. Harris was released during final roster cuts on August 30. He re–signed with the Jets on September 1. He was released on November 24 and re-signed to the practice squad.

=== Houston Texans ===
On November 21, 2023, Harris was signed to the Houston Texans practice squad. He was not signed to a reserve/future contract after the season and thus became a free agent when his practice squad contract expired.
