= 2015 Tennessee Volunteers football team =

American college football season

2015 Tennessee Volunteers football

Outback Bowl champion

Outback Bowl, W 45–6 vs. Northwestern
- Conference: Southeastern Conference
- Eastern Division

Ranking
- Coaches: No. 23
- AP: No. 22
- Record: 9–4 (5–3 SEC)
- Head coach: Butch Jones (3rd season)
- Offensive coordinator: Mike DeBord (1st season)
- Offensive scheme: Multiple
- Defensive coordinator: John Jancek (3rd season)
- Base defense: 4–3
- Home stadium: Neyland Stadium

2015 Southeastern Conference football standings
	Conf.			Overall
Team	W		L	W		L
Eastern Division
No. 25 Florida x	7	–	1	10	–	4
No. 22 Tennessee	5	–	3	9	–	4
Georgia	5	–	3	10	–	3
Vanderbilt	2	–	6	4	–	8
Kentucky	2	–	6	5	–	7
Missouri*	1	–	7	5	–	7
South Carolina	1	–	7	3	–	9
Western Division
No. 1 Alabama x$#^	7	–	1	14	–	1
No. 10 Ole Miss	6	–	2	10	–	3
Arkansas	5	–	3	8	–	5
No. 16 LSU *	5	–	3	9	–	3
Texas A&M	4	–	4	8	–	5
Mississippi State	4	–	4	9	–	4
Auburn	2	–	6	7	–	6
Championship: Alabama 29, Florida 15
# – College Football Playoff champion; ^ – College Football Playoff participant; $ – Conference champion; x – Division champion/co-champions; * LSU and Missouri vacated all wins due to NCAA violations.; Rankings from AP Poll

The 2015 Tennessee Volunteers football team represented the University of Tennessee in the 2015 season. This was the 119th overall season, 82nd as a member of the Southeastern Conference (SEC), and its 24th within the SEC Eastern Division. The team was coached by Butch Jones, in his third season with UT, and plays their home games at Neyland Stadium in Knoxville. This season was also the debut season of Mike DeBord as UT's offensive coordinator.

The Vols finished the regular season at 8–4, 5–3 in the SEC, making them bowl-eligible for a second consecutive season. On December 6, 2015, it was announced that the Vols would face the Northwestern Wildcats (10–2) in the Outback Bowl in Tampa, Florida, on January 1, 2016. Tennessee defeated the Wildcats 45–6, finishing the season at 9–4.

== Offseason ==
=== Spring practice ===
The Tennessee Volunteers opened up Spring Practice on March 21. Much like in 2014, Joshua Dobbs entered spring practice having finished the season as the starting quarterback due to injuries to Justin Worley. With Worley having graduated, however, Dobbs is now the clear frontrunner for the starting quarterback role. The coaches noted that he was being more consistent and efficient with signal calling and ball throwing. "The thing I liked about Josh today is that I thought he made the routine plays", Butch Jones told the VolQuest.com crew after UT's first day in pads Saturday. "He made the routine throws." Coleman Thomas, who was a starting offensive tackle, was suspended from the team activities in the wake of legal issues. Starting cornerback Emmanuel Moseley missed part of spring practice after contracting mono. Numerous players, including Derek Barnett, Marcus Jackson, Danny O'Brien, Jason Croom, Curt Maggitt, Jakob Johnson, Alex Ellis and early enrollees Kyle Phillips and Darrin Kirkland, missed the entire spring due to injuries. Others, including Jalen Hurd, Marquez North and Dillon Bates, were limited by injuries.

=== Post-spring practice ===
On May 21, 2015, following UT's Big Orange Caravan stop at Nissan Stadium, Coach Jones stated "We just can't be a year older. We have to be a year better, and that's part of that growth and that development." He added, "We'll still be exceptionally young in the defensive front. We're going to rely on two true freshman defensive tackles (Kahlil McKenzie and Shy Tuttle) to really play a big part in this year's outcome of many games, so we have to get them ready to go. But our older players have done a great job of mentoring the young players coming in. On the offensive front, we had some individuals who gained some valuable experience. You could see that kind of manifesting itself throughout the course of spring. You could see that confidence. You could see a change in strength levels. You could see a change in maturity, and also just in football knowledge."

=== Fall practice ===
The Vols began fall practice on August 4, 2015. Primary concerns involved the return of numerous players from injury, the improvement of the offensive line, finding starters at middle linebacker (to replace A.J. Johnson), left tackle (to replace Jacob Gilliam), and punter (to replace Matt Darr), and determining a backup quarterback. Prior to the beginning of fall practice, freshman quarterback Jauan Jennings announced he was switching to wide receiver, leaving freshman early enrollee Quinten Dormady and summer enrollee Sheriron Jones to compete for the backup quarterback slot. In mid-August, Butch Jones designated Dormady as the backup. Six players competed for the starting slot at middle linebacker: junior Kenny Bynum, sophomore Jakob Johnson, sophomore Gavin Bryant, sophomore walk-on Colton Jumper, redshirt freshman Dillon Bates, and freshman Darrin Kirkland, though Johnson eventually switched to tight end. In late August, Jones stated the competition was down to Kirkland and Jumper. Nate Renfro (a graduate transfer from Maryland), sophomore walk-on Trevor Daniel, and freshman Tommy Townsend were competing for the starting slot at punter.

Injuries continued to be a factor during fall practice. Senior offensive guard Marcus Jackson (a returning starter), junior offensive guard Austin Sanders, and sophomore defensive back Rashaan Gaulden (the projected starter at nickelback) all suffered season-ending injuries. Junior wide receivers Marquez North and Jason Croom, sophomore guard Jashon Robertson, and junior college transfer Justin Martin were among the players who missed portions of fall practice due to injuries.

Alton "Pig" Howard, leading wide-receiver from the 2014 season, was suspended for the first game of the season for unspecified violation of team rules. During his daily media availability on August 27, Coach Jones said that it wasn't "something that just occurred" and that it's "something that dates back many months." "To Alton's credit, I like the way he's approached training camp", he added. "He's had the best training camp that he's had since we've been here. I'm appreciative of his efforts, but he will miss the Bowling Green game." Coach Jones also announced that strong safety LaDarrell McNeil would miss extended time due to a neck injury. After his media session, Coach Jones took to Twitter to "officially" welcome Preston Williams – who was flagged by the NCAA Clearinghouse to retake the ACT Test – to the team.

== Personnel ==
=== Roster & staff ===
2015 Tennessee Volunteers football team roster
Players
Coaches
Offense

Pos.	#	Name	Class
RB	1	Jalen Hurd	So
WR	3	Josh Malone	So
RB	4	John Kelly	Fr
RB	5	Ralph David Abernathy IV	Sr
RB	6	Alvin Kamara	So
WR	7	Preston Williams	Fr
WR	8	Marquez North (injured)	Jr
WR	9	Von Pearson	Sr
WR	10	Vincent Perry (injured)	Fr
QB	11	Joshua Dobbs	Jr
QB	12	Quinten Dormady	Fr
QB	13	Sheriron Jones	Fr
QB	14	Zac Jancek	Fr
WR	15	Jauan Jennings	Fr
WR	18	Jason Croom (injured)	Jr
RB	21	Joe Young	Fr
WR	24	Michael Lacey	Fr
WR	25	Josh Smith	So
WR	28	Will Martinez	So
RB	37	Jayson Sparks	So
WR	38	Jaye Rochell	Jr
TE	44	Jakob Johnson	So
TE	47	Joe Stocstill	Jr
TE	48	Alex Ellis	Sr
OL	50	Venzell Boulware	Fr
OL	51	Drew Richmond	Fr
OL	55	Coleman Thomas	So
OL	57	Mack Crowder	Sr
OL	58	Aaron Adams	So
OL	60	Austin Sanders (injured)	So
OL	63	Brett Kendrick	So
OL	64	Ray Raulerson	Fr
OL	65	Clay Keaton	Fr
OL	66	Jack Jones	Fr
OL	67	Joe Keeler	Fr
OL	69	Jonathan Reynolds	So
OL	71	Dylan Wiesman	Jr
OL	74	Dontavius Blair	Jr
OL	75	Jashon Robertson (injured)	So
OL	75	Marcus Jackson (injured)	Sr
OL	76	Chance Hall	Fr
OL	77	Kyler Kerbyson	Sr
OL	78	Charles Mosley	Fr
OL	79	Thomas Edwards	So
TE	80	Eli Wolf	Fr
WR	81	Johnathon Johnson	Sr
TE	82	Ethan Wolf	So
WR	83	Cody Blanc	Jr
WR	84	Adrian Gamble	Jr
WR	87	Logan Fetzner	So
TE	88	Neiko Creamer	Fr
TE	89	Will Jumper	Fr

Defense

Pos.	#	Name	Class
DL	1	Kahlil McKenzie	Fr
DL	2	Shy Tuttle (injured)	Fr
DB	3	Micah Abernathy	Fr
DL	4	LaTroy Lewis	Jr
DL	5	Kyle Phillips (injured)	Fr
DB	6	Todd Kelly Jr.	So
DB	7	Cameron Sutton	Jr
DB	7	Rashaan Gaulden (injured)	So
DB	8	Justin Martin	So
DE	9	Derek Barnett	So
LB	11	Austin Smith	Fr
DB	12	Emmanuel Moseley	So
DB	13	Malik Foreman	Jr
LB	14	Quart'e Sapp	Fr
LB	17	Dillon Bates	Fr
DL	19	Darrell Taylor	Fr
LB	20	Cortez McDowell	So
LB	21	Jalen Reeves-Maybin	Jr
DB	24	Darrell Miller	Fr
DB	26	Stephen Griffin	Fr
DB	28	David Priddy	Jr
DB	29	Evan Berry	So
DB	30	Devin Williams	Jr
DB	33	LaDarrell McNeil	Sr
LB	34	Darrin Kirkland Jr	Fr
DB	35	MaLeik Gatewood	Fr
LB	36	Gavin Bryant	Fr
DB	37	Brian Randolph	Sr
DL	39	Kendal Vickers	So
DL	40	Dimarya Mixon	So
LB	41	Elliott Berry	So
LB	42	Chris Weatherd	Sr
DB	46	Max Arnold	Sr
LB	47	Landon Knoll	Fr
LB	48	DaJour Maddox	Fr
DE	50	Corey Vereen	Jr
LB	51	Kenny Bynum	Jr
DL	52	Andrew Butcher (injured)	Fr
LB	53	Colton Jumper	So
DL	55	Quay Picou	Fr
LB/DL	56	Curt Maggitt (injured)	Sr
DL	58	Owen Williams	Sr
DL	90	Charles Folger	Jr
DL	94	Tyler Stokes	Fr
DL	95	Danny O'Brien	Jr
DL	96	Trevarris Saulsberry	Sr
DL	97	Paul Bain	Fr

Special teams

Pos.	#	Name	Class
H	10	Patrick Ashford	Sr
PK	25	Aaron Medley	So
P	27	Tommy Townsend	Fr
PK	30	Holden Foster	Jr
P	31	Nate Renfroe	Sr
PK	39	Alex Jones	Fr
PK	43	Laszlo Toser	Fr
LS	46	Riley Lovingood	Fr
LS	52	Elijah Medford	Fr
LS	53	Will Bradshaw	So
LS	59	Matt Giampapa	Sr
P	93	Trevor Daniel	So
PK	97	George Bullock	Jr

Head coach

- Butch Jones – 3rd year

Coordinators/assistant coaches

- Mike DeBord (offensive coordinator/quarterbacks coach) – 1st year
- John Jancek (defensive coordinator) – 3rd year
- Willie Martinez (assistant head coach/defensive backs coach) – 3rd year
- Steve Stripling (associate head coach/defensive line coach) – 3rd year
- Zach Azzanni (wide receivers coach/recruiting coordinator) – 3rd year
- Mark Elder (tight ends coach/special teams coordinator) – 3rd year
- Robert Gillespie (running backs coach) – 3rd year
- Tommy Thigpen (linebackers coach) – 3rd year
- Dave Lawson (director of strength and conditioning) – 3rd year

Legend

- (C) Team captain
- (S) Suspended
- (I) Ineligible
- Injured
- Redshirt

Roster
Last update: November 4, 2015

=== 2015 recruiting class ===
Tennessee's 2015 recruiting class is ranked the third-best overall 2015 class by 247Sports.com, fourth-best by Rivals.com, and fifth-best by Scout.com.

College recruiting (2015)
Name	Hometown	School	Height	Weight	40^{‡}	Commit date
Micah Abernathy; DB	Norcross, Georgia	Greater Atlanta Christian	6 ft 1 in (1.85 m)	187 lb (85 kg)	4.48	Oct 10, 2014
Micah Abernathy; DB	Recruit ratings: Scout: Rivals: 247Sports: ESPN:					
Venzell Boulware; OL	Fairburn, Georgia	Creekside HS	6 ft 4 in (1.93 m)	293 lb (133 kg)	–	Aug 23, 2014
Venzell Boulware; OL	Recruit ratings: Scout: Rivals: 247Sports: ESPN:					
Andrew Butcher; DE	Alpharetta, Georgia	Alpharetta HS	6 ft 3 in (1.91 m)	249 lb (113 kg)	4.8	Jun 8, 2013
Andrew Butcher; DE	Recruit ratings: Scout: Rivals: 247Sports: ESPN:					
Quinten Dormady; QB	Boerne, Texas	Boerne HS	6 ft 4 in (1.93 m)	210 lb (95 kg)	–	Jun 9, 2014
Quinten Dormady; QB	Recruit ratings: Scout: Rivals: 247Sports: ESPN:					
Stephen Griffin; DB	Charlotte, North Carolina	South Mecklenburg HS	6 ft 3 in (1.91 m)	180 lb (82 kg)	–	Mar 20, 2014
Stephen Griffin; DB	Recruit ratings: Scout: Rivals: 247Sports: ESPN:					
Chance Hall; OL	Roanoke, Virginia	Northside HS	6 ft 4 in (1.93 m)	290 lb (130 kg)	–	Jul 3, 2014
Chance Hall; OL	Recruit ratings: Scout: Rivals: 247Sports: ESPN:					
Jauan Jennings; QB	Murfreesboro, Tennessee	Blackman HS	6 ft 3 in (1.91 m)	180 lb (82 kg)	–	Apr 7, 2014
Jauan Jennings; QB	Recruit ratings: Scout: Rivals: 247Sports: ESPN:					
Jack Jones; OL	Murfreesboro, Tennessee	Oakland HS	6 ft 4 in (1.93 m)	300 lb (140 kg)	–	May 9, 2013
Jack Jones; OL	Recruit ratings: Scout: Rivals: 247Sports: ESPN:					
Sheriron Jones; QB	Moreno Valley, California	Rancho Verde HS	6 ft 3 in (1.91 m)	190 lb (86 kg)	4.71	Jan 8, 2015
Sheriron Jones; QB	Recruit ratings: Scout: Rivals: 247Sports: ESPN:					
Alvin Kamara; RB	Hutchinson, Kansas	Hutchinson CC	5 ft 11 in (1.80 m)	205 lb (93 kg)	4.50	Jun 21, 2014
Alvin Kamara; RB	Recruit ratings: Scout: Rivals: 247Sports: ESPN:					
John Kelly; ATH	Oak Park, Michigan	Oak Park HS	5 ft 10 in (1.78 m)	198.5 lb (90.0 kg)	4.70	Jan 22, 2015
John Kelly; ATH	Recruit ratings: Scout: Rivals: 247Sports: ESPN:					
Darrin Kirkland Jr. ILB	Indianapolis	Lawrence Central HS	6 ft 1 in (1.85 m)	228 lb (103 kg)	4.80	Dec 15, 2014
Darrin Kirkland Jr. ILB	Recruit ratings: Scout: Rivals: 247Sports: ESPN:					
Riley Lovingood; OL	Hendersonville, Tennessee	Beech Senior HS	6 ft 1 in (1.85 m)	240 lb (110 kg)	–	Mar 8, 2014
Riley Lovingood; OL	Recruit ratings: Scout: Rivals: 247Sports: ESPN:					
Justin Martin; CB	Miami, Oklahoma	Northeastern Oklahoma A&M J.C.	6 ft 2 in (1.88 m)	187 lb (85 kg)	–	Jan 9, 2015
Justin Martin; CB	Recruit ratings: Scout: Rivals: 247Sports: ESPN:					
Kahlil McKenzie; DT	Concord, California	Clayton Valley HS	6 ft 4 in (1.93 m)	340 lb (150 kg)	5.27	Jul 10, 2014
Kahlil McKenzie; DT	Recruit ratings: Scout: Rivals: 247Sports: ESPN:					
Darrell Miller; CB	Cedar Hill, Texas	Cedar Hill HS	5 ft 10 in (1.78 m)	170 lb (77 kg)	–	Jul 19, 2014
Darrell Miller; CB	Recruit ratings: Scout: Rivals: 247Sports: ESPN:					
Kyle Oliver; TE	Murfreesboro, Tennessee	Oakland HS	6 ft 4 in (1.93 m)	228 lb (103 kg)	–	Jun 22, 2014
Kyle Oliver; TE	Recruit ratings: Scout: Rivals: 247Sports: ESPN:					
Kyle Phillips; DE	Nashville, Tennessee	Hillsboro HS	6 ft 3 in (1.91 m)	253.5 lb (115.0 kg)	–	Jan 3, 2015
Kyle Phillips; DE	Recruit ratings: Scout: Rivals: 247Sports: ESPN:					
Quay Picou; DT	Buford, Georgia	Buford HS	6 ft 3 in (1.91 m)	273 lb (124 kg)	–	Jun 21, 2014
Quay Picou; DT	Recruit ratings: Scout: Rivals: 247Sports: ESPN:					
Drew Richmond; OT	Memphis, Tennessee	Memphis University HS	6 ft 5 in (1.96 m)	319 lb (145 kg)	5.42	Feb 4, 2015
Drew Richmond; OT	Recruit ratings: Scout: Rivals: 247Sports: ESPN:					
Quart'e Sapp; OLB	Alpharetta, Georgia	Milton HS	6 ft 1 in (1.85 m)	200 lb (91 kg)	4.76	Jan 29, 2015
Quart'e Sapp; OLB	Recruit ratings: Scout: Rivals: 247Sports: ESPN:					
Austin Smith; OLB	Buford, Ga	Buford HS	6 ft 3 in (1.91 m)	224 lb (102 kg)	–	Jun 21, 2014
Austin Smith; OLB	Recruit ratings: Scout: Rivals: 247Sports: ESPN:					
Zach Stewart; OG	Coalfield, Tennessee	Coalfield HS	6 ft 4 in (1.93 m)	313 lb (142 kg)	–	Apr 18, 2013
Zach Stewart; OG	Recruit ratings: Scout: Rivals: 247Sports: ESPN:					
Darrell Taylor; DE	Hopewell, Virginia	Hopewell HS	6 ft 4 in (1.93 m)	224 lb (102 kg)	–	Sep 26, 2014
Darrell Taylor; DE	Recruit ratings: Scout: Rivals: 247Sports: ESPN:					
Tommy Townsend; P	Orlando, Florida	Boone HS	6 ft 1 in (1.85 m)	179.5 lb (81.4 kg)	–	Jun 23, 2014
Tommy Townsend; P	Recruit ratings: Scout: Rivals: 247Sports: ESPN:					
Shy Tuttle; DT	Lexington, North Carolina	North Davidson HS	6 ft 2 in (1.88 m)	312 lb (142 kg)	–	Sep 26, 2014
Shy Tuttle; DT	Recruit ratings: Scout: Rivals: 247Sports: ESPN:					
Preston Williams; WR	Hampton, Georgia	Lovejoy HS	6 ft 3 in (1.91 m)	190 lb (86 kg)	4.67	Jan 27, 2014
Preston Williams; WR	Recruit ratings: Scout: Rivals: 247Sports: ESPN:					
Overall recruit ranking: Scout: 5 Rivals: 4 247Sports: 3
‡ Refers to 40-yard dash; Note: In many cases, Scout, Rivals, 247Sports, On3, and ESPN may conflict in their listings of height, weight and 40 time.; In these cases, the average was taken. ESPN grades are on a 100-point scale.; Sources: "2015 Team Ranking". Rivals.com.

=== Depth chart ===
Defense

FS
Brian Randolph
Evan Berry
⋅

WLB	MLB	SLB
Jalen Reeves-Maybin	Darrin Kirkland Jr.	Kenny Bynum
Cortez McDowell	Colton Jumper	Austin Smith
⋅	Kenny Bynum	⋅

SS
LaDarrell McNeil
Todd Kelly Jr.
Max Arnold

CB
Cameron Sutton
Darrell Miller
Justin Martin

DE	DT	DT	DE
Corey Vereen	Kendal Vickers	Owen Williams	Derek Barnett
LaTroy Lewis	Danny O'Brien	Kahlil McKenzie	Dimarya Mixon
Kyle Phillips	⋅	Quay Picou	⋅

CB
Justin Martin
Emmanuel Moseley
Malik Foreman

Offense

WR
Josh Smith
Marquez North
⋅

WR
Josh Malone
Johnathon Johnson
Preston Williams

LT	LG	C	RG	RT
Kyler Kerbyson	Jashon Robertson	Coleman Thomas	Dylan Weisman	Chance Hall
Chance Hall	Dylan Weisman	Mack Crowder	Jack Jones	Brett Kendrick
⋅	Charles Moseley	Ray Raulerson	Venzell Boulware	Drew Richmond

TE
Ethan Wolf
Alex Ellis
⋅

WR
Von Pearson
Jauan Jennings
⋅

QB
Joshua Dobbs
Quinten Dormady
Sheriron Jones

RB
Jalen Hurd
Alvin Kamara
John Kelly

Special teams
PK Aaron Medley
PK George Bullock
P Trevor Daniel
P Nate Renfro
KR Evan Berry
PR Cam Sutton
LS Matt Giampapa
H Patrick Ashford

== Schedule ==
Tennessee announced their 2015 football schedule on October 14, 2014. The 2015 schedule consisted of seven home games, four away games, and one neutral site game in the regular season. The Volunteers hosted SEC foes Arkansas, Georgia, South Carolina, and Vanderbilt, and traveled to Alabama, Florida, Kentucky, and Missouri.

Tennessee opened the season at a neutral site for the first time since 2012 at Nissan Stadium in Nashville, against Bowling Green. The Vols then hosted Oklahoma for the second game of the home series. Western Carolina then traveled to Neyland Stadium for the first meeting between the two schools. To end the non–conference match ups, North Texas will make a trip to Knoxville for the second meeting of the two schools. North Texas defeated the Vols in their first meeting in 1975, 21–14. The Arkansas–Tennessee match up will be the first time since they play against each other since 2011. The Kentucky–Tennessee match up will be played in October (on Halloween) for the first time since 1909.

Tennessee had originally scheduled UAB as its 2015 season opener. On December 2, 2014, however, UAB announced they were shutting down their football program at the end of the 2014–15 academic year. (UAB announced in June 2015 that it would be bringing back the program for a 2017 debut.) The shutdown led Tennessee to find a new team to open against at Nissan Stadium. A week later the Vols announced that Bowling Green will replace UAB in the opener of the 2015 season, for the first meeting between the two schools.

Date	Time	Opponent	Rank	Site	TV	Result	Attendance
September 5	4:00 p.m.	vs. Bowling Green*	No. 25	Nissan Stadium; Nashville, TN	SECN	W 59–30	61,323
September 12	6:00 p.m.	No. 19 Oklahoma*	No. 23	Neyland Stadium; Knoxville, TN (Checker Neyland)	ESPN	L 24–31 ^{2OT}	102,455
September 19	7:00 p.m.	Western Carolina*		Neyland Stadium; Knoxville, TN	ESPNU	W 55–10	102,136
September 26	3:30 p.m.	at Florida		Ben Hill Griffin Stadium; Gainesville, FL (rivalry / SEC Nation)	CBS	L 27–28	90,527
October 3	7:00 p.m.	Arkansas		Neyland Stadium; Knoxville, TN	ESPN2	L 20–24	101,265
October 10	3:30 p.m	No. 19 Georgia		Neyland Stadium; Knoxville, TN (rivalry / SEC Nation)	CBS	W 38–31	102,455
October 24	3:30 p.m	at No. 8 Alabama		Bryant–Denny Stadium; Tuscaloosa, AL (Third Saturday in October / SEC Nation)	CBS	L 14–19	101,821
October 31	7:30 p.m.	at Kentucky		Commonwealth Stadium; Lexington, KY (rivalry / SEC Nation)	SECN	W 52–21	60,886
November 7	4:00 p.m.	South Carolina		Neyland Stadium; Knoxville, TN (rivalry)	SECN	W 27–24	101,253
November 14	Noon	North Texas*^{†}		Neyland Stadium; Knoxville, TN	SECN	W 24–0	96,197
November 21	7:15 p.m.	at Missouri		Faurot Field; Columbia, MO	ESPN2	W 19–8	59,575
November 28	4:00 p.m.	Vanderbilt		Neyland Stadium; Knoxville, TN (rivalry)	SECN	W 53–28	98,327
January 1	12:00 p.m.	vs. No. 13 Northwestern*	No. 23	Raymond James Stadium; Tampa, FL (Outback Bowl)	ESPN2	W 45–6	53,202
*Non-conference game; ^{†}Homecoming; Rankings from AP Poll and CFP Rankings after November 3 released prior to game; All times are in Eastern time

Schedule source:

== Game summaries ==
=== Bowling Green ===
Bowling Green Falcons vs #25 Tennessee Volunteers – Game summary

Quarter	1	2	3	4	Total
Bowling Green	10	10	10	0	30
#25 Tennessee	21	14	14	10	59

at Nissan Stadium • Nashville, Tennessee

- Date: September 5, 2015
- Game time: 4:00 p.m.
- Game weather: Temperature: 89 °F (32 °C) • Wind: 9 mph (14 km/h) • Weather: partly cloudy
- Game attendance: 61,323
- Referee: Ken Williamson • Umpire: Wally Hough • Linesman: Lane Thomas • Line judge: Mickey Bryson • Back judge: Grantis Bell • Field judge: Jamie Grant • Side judge: Rob Skelton • Center judge: Martin Hankins
- TV announcers (SECN): Tom Hart (play–by–play), Andre Ware (color), Laura Rutledge (sideline)

Game information

First quarter

- BGSU Tyler Tate, 40-yd FG, 12:43. BG 3–0. 7 plays, 53 yards. 2:17.
- TENN Jalen Hurd 8-yd run (Aaron Medley kick), 10:35. TENN 7–3. 10 plays, 75 yards. 3:44.
- TENN Alvin Kamara 10-yd run (Aaron Medley kick), 7:18. TENN 14–3. 2 plays, 30 yards, 0:22.
- TENN Jalen Hurd 1-yd run (Aaron Medley kick), 5:07. TENN 21–3. 4 plays, 24 yards, 1:13.
- BGSU Matt Johnson 11-yd pass to Hunter Folkertsma (Tyler Tate kick), 2:47. TENN 21–10. 8 plays, 75 yards, 2:20.

Second quarter

- BGSU Matt Johnson 31-yd pass to Gehrig Dieter (Tyler Tate kick), 11:00. TENN 21–17. 6 plays, 94 yards, 2:13.
- BGSU Tyler Tate 37-yd FG, 5:31. TENN 21–20. 13 plays, 55 yards, 3:59.
- TENN Jalen Hurd 13-yd run (Aaron Medley kick), 1:52. TENN 28–20. 11 plays, 75 yards, 3:39.
- TENN Joshua Dobbs 11-yd pass to Ethan Wolf (Aaron Medley kick), 0:32. TENN 35–20. 5 plays, 29 yards, 0:40.

Third quarter

- BGSU Ryan Burbrink 7-yd run (Tyler Tate kick), 11:33. TENN 35–27. 5 plays, 75 yards, 1:14.
- TENN Joshua Dobbs 18-yd pass to Ethan Wolf (Aaron Medley kick), 11:17. 42–27. 1 play, 18 yards, 0:16.
- BGSU Tyler Tate 25-yd FG, 4:26. TENN 42–30. 13 plays, 62 yards, 4:04.
- TENN Alvin Kamara 56-yd run (Aaron Medley kick), 0:03. TENN 49–30. 1 play, 56 yards, 0:11.

Fourth quarter

- TENN Joshua Dobbs 18-yd run (Aaron Medley kick), 10:02. TENN 56–30. 9 plays, 94 yards, 3:12.
- TENN Aaron Medley 26-yd FG, 3:08. TENN 59–30. 11 plays, 45 yards, 5:37.

Top passers

- BGSU – Matt Johnson – 27/48, 424 yards, 2 TD
- TENN – Joshua Dobbs – 15/22, 250 yards, 2 TD

Top rushers

- BGSU – Fred Coppet – 12 rushes, 63 yards
- TENN – Alvin Kamara – 15 rushes, 144 yards, 2 TD; Jalen Hurd, 23 rushes, 123 yards, 3 TD

Top receivers

- BGSU – Gehrig Dieter – 7 receptions, 133 yards, 1 TD
- TENN – Jauan Jennings – 3 receptions, 56 yards

The 2015 Tennessee Volunteers, ranked 25th in the nation, kicked off its first game of the season against the Bowling Green Falcons at Nissan Stadium in Nashville, Tennessee. Jalen Hurd had three first-half touchdown runs, Alvin Kamara ran for two more scores, and Tennessee went on to win 59–30 in a game delayed 80 minutes in the second half by lightning.

=== #19 Oklahoma ===
#19 Oklahoma Sooners vs #23 Tennessee Volunteers – Game summary

Quarter	1	2	3	4	OT	2OT	Total
#19 Oklahoma	0	3	0	14	7	7	31
#23 Tennessee	10	7	0	0	7	0	24

at Neyland Stadium • Knoxville, Tennessee

- Date: September 12, 2015
- Game time: 6:00 p.m.
- Game weather: Temperature: 72 °F (22 °C) • Wind: 8 mph (13 km/h) • Weather: partly cloudy
- Game attendance: 102,455
- Referee: Mike Defee • Umpire: Robert Richeson • Linesman: Al Green • Line judge: Quentin Givens • Back judge: Terry Jones • Field judge: Joe Blubaugh • Side judge: Lo van Pham • Center judge: Mike Cuttone
- TV announcers (ESPN): Brad Nessler (play–by–play), Todd Blackledge (color), Holly Rowe (sideline)

Game information

First quarter

- TENN Aaron Medley 19-yd FG, 9:51. TENN 3–0. 11 plays, 50 yards, 3:10.
- TENN Joshua Dobbs 9-yd pass to Josh Malone (Aaron Medley kick), 1:56. TENN 10–0. 8 plays, 51 yards, 3:01.

Second quarter

- TENN Joshua Dobbs 4-yd run (Aaron Medley kick), 12:14. TENN 17–0. 4 plays, 55 yards, 1:18.
- OU Austin Seibert 35-yd FG, 4:56. TENN 17–3. 9 plays, 56 yards, 2:47.

Third quarter

- No scores.

Fourth quarter

- OU Baker Mayfield 2-yd pass to Samaje Perine (Austin Seibert kick), 8:20. TENN 17–10. 14 plays, 80 yards, 5:53.
- OU Baker Mayfield 5-yd pass to Sterling Shepard (Austin Seibert kick), 0:40. TIE 17–17. 13 plays, 60 yards, 5:26.

First overtime

- TENN Jalen Hurd 8-yd run (Aaron Medley kick), 0:00. TENN 24–17. 5 plays, 25 yards, 0:00.
- OU Baker Mayfield 1-yd run (Austin Seibert kick). TIE 24–24. 5 plays, 25 yards, 0:00.

Second overtime

- OU Baker Mayfield 18-yd pass to Sterling Shepard (Austin Seibert kick) OU 31–24. 3 plays, 25 yards, 0:00.

Top passers

- OU – Baker Mayfield: 19–39, 187 yards, 3 TD, 2 INT
- TENN – Joshua Dobbs – 13–31, 125 yards, 1 TD, 1 INT

Top rushers

- OU – Samaje Perine – 23 rushes, 78 yards
- TENN – Jalen Hurd – 24 carries, 106 yards, 1 TD

Top receivers

- OU – Sterling Shepard – 7 receptions, 74 yards, 2 TD
- TENN – Josh Smith – 4 receptions, 56 yards

The 19th-ranked Oklahoma Sooners played the 23rd-ranked Volunteers for the fourth time in history, the first in Knoxville.Derek Barnett, Chris Weatherd, Curt Maggit, Cam Sutton, and Brian Randolph were key contributors on the Vols defense. The Volunteers led 17–3 into the fourth quarter, but the Sooners came back to force the game into two overtime periods and win 31–24. The game's live broadcast on ESPN was watched by 4.12 million viewers, making it the most-watched cable program of the day.

=== Western Carolina ===
Western Carolina Catamounts vs Tennessee Volunteers – Game summary

Quarter	1	2	3	4	Total
Western Carolina	0	3	0	7	10
Tennessee	10	31	14	0	55

at Neyland Stadium • Knoxville, Tennessee

- Date: September 19, 2015
- Game time: 7:00 p.m.
- Game weather: Temperature: 81 °F (27 °C) • Wind: 3 mph (4.8 km/h) • Weather: partly cloudy
- Game attendance: 102,136
- Referee: Hubert Owens • Umpire: Russ Pulley • Linesman: Chad Green • Line judge: Chuck Rice • Back judge: Michael Watson • Field judge: Greg Thomas • Side judge: Chad Hill • Center judge: Walt Hill
- TV announcers (ESPNU): Allen Bestwick (play-by-play), Dan Hawkins (color)

Game information

First quarter

- TENN Joshua Dobbs 25-yd pass to Preston Williams (Aaron Medley kick), 11:53. TENN 7–0. 5 plays, 51 yards, 1:24.
- TENN Aaron Medley 20-yd FG, 6:23. TENN 10–0. 12 plays, 84 yards, 3:43.

Second quarter

- TENN Joshua Dobbs 5-yd pass to Jalen Hurd (Aaron Medley kick), 13:06. TENN 17–0. 7 plays, 44 yards, 2:30.
- TENN Aaron Medley 31-yd FG, 5:12. TENN 20–0. 11 plays, 54 yards, 3:33.
- TENN Jalen Hurd 8-yd run (Aaron Medley kick), 4:20. TENN 27–0. 1 play, 8 yards, 0:08.
- TENN Alvin Kamara 2-yd run (Aaron Medley kick), 2:53. TENN 34–0. 3 plays, 21 yards. 0:37.
- WCU Logan Howard 32-yd FG, 1:00. TENN 34–3. 5 plays, 51 yards, 1:53.
- TENN Evan Berry 88-yd kickoff return (Aaron Medley kick), 0:45. TENN 41–3, 0:15.

Third quarter

- TENN Alvin Kamara 50-yd punt return (Aaron Medley kick), 11:53. TENN 48–3.
- TENN Quinten Dormady 24-yd pass to Preston Williams (Aaron Medley kick), 7:45. TENN 55–3. 6 plays, 90 yards, 2:05.

Fourth quarter

- WCU Detrez Newsome 64-yd run (Logan Howard kick), 10:59. TENN 55–10. 4 plays, 81 yards, 1:40.

Top passers

- WCU – Troy Mitchell – 6–14, 47 yards, 1 INT; Wes Holcombe – 5–8, 43 yards
- TENN – Joshua Dobbs – 15–21, 144 yards, 2 TD; Quinten Dormady – 6–8, 93 yards, 1 TD

Top rushers

- WCU – Detrez Newsome – 10 rushes, 128 yards, 1 TD
- TENN – Jalen Hurd – 11 rushes, 68 yards, 1 TD; John Kelly – 13 rushes, 59 yards; Alvin Kamara – 7 rushes, 47 yards, 1 TD

Top receivers

- WCU – Karnorris Benson – 3 receptions, 38 yards; Spearman Robinson – 3 receptions, 30 yards
- TENN – Preston Williams – 3 receptions, 98 yards, 2 TD

In Knoxville, the Volunteers faced the Western Carolina Catamounts for the first time ever and won 55–10. Alvin Kamara became the first Tennessee player in 40 years to score on a punt return (50 yards) and a run from scrimmage in the same game. Coupling Kamara's return with Evan Berry's 88-yard kickoff return, prior to the end of the first half, also marked a first for special teams scoring since a 1950 victory over Washington and Lee.

Regarding heading into the game following the loss to Oklahoma, Coach Butch Jones commented "It was a big game for us to see how we would respond." He added "I thought our competitive character was challenged a little bit in how we prepared this week and how we'd come out in our approach to this game."

=== Florida ===
Tennessee Volunteers at Florida Gators – Game summary

Quarter	1	2	3	4	Total
Tennessee	7	10	3	7	27
Florida	7	0	7	14	28

at Ben Hill Griffin Stadium • Gainesville, Florida

- Date: September 26, 2015
- Game time: 3:30 p.m.
- Game weather: Temperature: 87 °F (31 °C) • Wind: 5 mph (8.0 km/h) • Weather: Sunny
- Game attendance: 90,527
- Referee: David Smith • Umpire: Jeff Roberson • Linesman: G A Gus Morris • Line judge: Paul Petrisko • Back judge: Roy A Potts • Field judge: Andy Britton • Side judge: Michael William • Center judge: Chad Lorance
- TV announcers (CBS): Verne Lundquist (play-by-play), Gary Danielson (color) and Allie LaForce (sideline)

Game information

First quarter

- UF Kelvin Taylor 5-yard run (Jorge Powell kick), 10:23.
- TENN Joshua Dobbs 58-yard pass from Jauan Jennings (Aaron Medley kick), 5:07

Second quarter

- TENN Jalen Hurd 1-yard run (Aaron Medley kick), 8:18
- TENN Aaron Medley 34-yard field goal, 3:13

Third quarter

- TENN Aaron Medley 37-yard field goal, 11:07
- UF Kelvin Taylor 4-yard run (Jorge Powell kick), 5:42

Fourth quarter

- TENN Jalen Hurd 10-yard run (Aaron Medley kick), 10:19
- UF Brandon Powell 5-yard pass from Will Grier (Jorge Powell kick), 4:09
- UF Antonio Calloway 63-yard pass from Will Grier (Jorge Powell kick), 1:26

Top passers

- TENN – Joshua Dobbs – 10–17, 83 yards; Jajuan Jennings – 1–1, 58 yards, 1 TD
- FLA – Will Grier – 23–42, 283 yards, 1 INT, 2 TD

Top rushers

- TENN – Jalen Hurd – 28 rushes, 113 yards, 2 TD; Joshua Dobbs – 18 rushes, 165 yards
- FLA – Kelvin Taylor – 19 rushes, 102 yards, 2 TD

Top receivers

- TENN – Ethan Wolf – 3 receptions, 45 yards; Alvin Kamara – 3 receptions, 33 yards; Joshua Dobbs – 1 reception, 58 yards, 1 TD
- FLA – Antonio Callaway, 5 receptions, 112 yards, 1 TD; Powell, 5 receptions, 64 yards, 1 TD

The Volunteers went to "The Swamp" to play one of their rivalries, the Florida Gators. Florida won the game, 28–27, extending its win streak over Tennessee to 11 games. Volunteers kicker Aaron Medley had a chance to win the game with a 55-yard field goal, but his attempt missed by a foot to the right.

=== Arkansas ===
Arkansas Razorbacks at Tennessee Volunteers – Game summary

Quarter	1	2	3	4	Total
Arkansas	7	10	7	0	24
Tennessee	14	3	3	0	20

at Neyland Stadium • Knoxville, Tennessee

- Date: October 3, 2015
- Game time: 7:00 p.m.
- Game weather: Temperature: 62 °F (17 °C) • Wind: 7 mph (11 km/h) • Weather: showers
- Game attendance: 101,265
- Referee: Marc Curles • Umpire: Tom Quick • Linesman: John Langlois • Line judge: Kirk Lewis • Back judge: Scott Vaughan • Field judge: Wes Booker • Side judge: Richard Booker • Center judge: Wayne Winkler
- TV announcers (ESPN2): Mark Jones (play-by-play), Rod Gilmore (color) and Quint Kessenich (sideline)

Game information

First quarter

- TENN Evan Berry 96-yard kickoff return (Aaron Medley kick), 14:48.
- TENN Joshua Dobbs 7-yard run (Aaron Medley kick), 8:06.
- ARK Alex Collins 4-yard run (Cole Hedlund kick), 5:57.

Second quarter

- ARK Dominique Reed 33-yard pass from Brandon Allen (Cole Hedlund kick), 14:03.
- TENN Aaron Medley 35-yard FG, 9:54.
- ARK Cole Hedlund 26-yard FG, 0:00.

Third quarter

- ARK Alex Collins 1-yard run (Cole Hedlund kick), 9:12.
- TENN Aaron Medley 45-yard FG, 6:41.

Fourth quarter

- No scores.

Top passers

- ARK – Brandon Allen – 11–24, 219 yards, 1 TD
- TENN – Joshua Dobbs – 20–36, 232 yards

Top rushers

- ARK – Alex Collins – 27 rushes, 164 yards, 2 TD; Rawleigh Williams III – 14 rushes, 100 yards
- TENN – Jalen Hurd – 19 rushes, 101 yards; Joshua Dobbs – 7 rushes, 16 yards, 1 TD

Top receivers

- ARK – Drew Morgan – 5 receptions, 110 yards; Hunter Henry – 3 receptions, 62 yards; Dominique Reed – 1 reception, 33 yards, 1 TD
- TENN – Alvin Kamara – 4 receptions, 40 yards; Jalen Hurd – 3 receptions, 51 yards

The Volunteers hosted the Arkansas Razorbacks and hoped to extend their home record to 7–1 against the "Hogs". Tennessee began with an early lead with Evan Berry's 96-yard opening kickoff return and Joshua Dobbs's 7-yard run on the following drive. However, Arkansas tied the game at 17 before halftime and would score the game's only remaining touchdown in the third quarter to go on to win 24–20.

Following the Volunteers' third loss in four games, and blowing a two-touchdown lead in each of those defeats, Coach Butch Jones stated "Our competitive character is being tested. Our fortitude is being tested. All you can do is keep working – and work your way through it."

=== #19 Georgia ===
#19 Georgia Bulldogs at Tennessee Volunteers – Game summary

Quarter	1	2	3	4	Total
#19 Georgia	7	17	0	7	31
Tennessee	3	14	14	7	38

at Neyland Stadium • Knoxville, Tennessee

- Date: October 10, 2015
- Game time: 3:30 p.m
- Game weather: Temperature: 64 °F (18 °C) • Wind: 7 mph (11 km/h) • Weather: cloudy
- Game attendance: 102,455
- Referee: Tom Ritter • Umpire: Stan Weihe • Linesman: Johnny Crawford • Line judge: Tim Beard • Back judge: Dax Hill • Field judge: J. Taylor • Side judge: Anthony Jeffrie • Center judge: James Carter
- TV announcers (CBS): Verne Lundquist (play-by-play), Gary Danielson (color) and Allie LaForce (sideline)

Game information

First quarter

- UGA Leonard Floyd 96-yard fumble recovery, (Marshall Morgan kick), 6:14.
- TENN Aaron Medley 22-yard field goal, 1:39.

Second quarter

- UGA Malcolm Mitchell 28-yard pass from Greyson Lambert (Marshall Morgan kick), 14:53.
- UGA Marshall Morgan 37 yd field goal, 4:47.
- UGA – Reggie Davis 70 yd punt return (Marshall Morgan kick), 3:27.
- TENN Josh Smith 39-yard pass from Joshua Dobbs (Aaron Medley kick), 1:04.
- TENN Alvin Kamara 2-yard pass from Joshua Dobbs (Aaron Medley kick), 0:27.

Third quarter

- TENN Joshua Dobbs 1-yard run (Aaron Medley kick), 8:31.
- TENN Alvin Kamara 2-yard pass from Joshua Dobbs (Aaron Medley kick), 1:26.

Fourth quarter

- UGA Reggie Davis 48-yard pass from Greyson Lambert (Marshall Morgan kick), 14:53.
- TENN Joshua Dobbs 5-yard run (Aaron Medley kick), 5:48.

Top passers

- UGA – Greyson Lambert – 15–32, 279 yards, 2 TD
- TENN – Joshua Dobbs – 25–42, 312 yards, 3 TD, 1 INT

Top rushers

- UGA – Sony Michel – 22 rushes, 145 yards
- TENN – Joshua Dobbs – 18 rushes, 125 yards, 2 TD; Jalen Hurd – 21 rushes, 84 yards

Top receivers

- UGA – Malcolm Mitchell – 5 receptions, 85 yards, 1 TD; Reggie Davis – 3 receptions, 101 yards, 1 TD
- TENN – Josh Malone – 5 receptions, 60 yards; Alvin Kamara – 5 receptions, 31 yards, 2 TD; Josh Smith – 2 receptions, 40 yards, 1 TD

The 19th-ranked Georgia Bulldogs came to Knoxville even in their series rivalry with Tennessee. Georgia looked to enter halftime with a 24–3 lead, but the Volunteers scored twice within the last 2:30 of the first half to cut the lead to seven. They scored a further 14 unanswered points in the third quarter. The Bulldogs only managed to score one touchdown in the second half and Tennessee mounted its third biggest comeback in school history to win 38–31, thus ending its five-game losing streak to the Bulldogs.

Tennessee coach Butch Jones stated "[Tennessee] had a different look [...] This football team was not going to be denied. They were going to find a way to win the football game. I'm just happy for them because they deserve to have this feeling."

For his overall performance in the game, quarterback Joshua Dobbs earned Southeastern Conference Offensive Player of the Week honors. Dobbs' combined passing and rushing for over 400 yards marks the second time in both his career and Tennessee's history.

=== #8 Alabama ===
Tennessee Volunteers at Alabama Crimson Tide – Game summary

Quarter	1	2	3	4	Total
Tennessee	7	0	0	7	14
#8 Alabama	7	0	3	9	19

at Bryant–Denny Stadium • Tuscaloosa, Alabama

- Date: October 24, 2015
- Game time: 3:30 p.m.
- Game weather: Temperature: 82 °F (28 °C) • Wind: 11 mph (18 km/h) • Weather: Partly cloudy
- Game attendance: 101,821
- Referee: John McDaid • Umpire: Tom Quick • Linesman: Gary Jayroe • Line judge: David Oliver • Back judge: Tony Josselyn • Field judge: P. Davenport • Side judge: Chris Conley • Center judge: Wayne Winkler
- TV announcers (CBS): Verne Lundquist (play-by-play), Gary Danielson (color) and Allie LaForce (sideline)

Game information

First quarter

- BAMA Derrick Henry 20-yd run (Adam Griffith kick), 7:14.
- TENN Josh Smith 11-yard pass from Joshua Dobbs (Aaron Medley kick), 3:00.

Second quarter

- No scores.

Third quarter

- BAMA Adam Griffith 19-yard FG, 9:00.

Fourth quarter

- BAMA Adam Griffith 28-yd FG, 7:08.
- TENN Jalen Hurd 12-yd run (Aaron Medley kick), 5:49.
- BAMA Derrick Henry 14 yd run, 2:24 (Conversion failed).

Top passers

- TENN – Joshua Dobbs – 13–22, 171 yards, 1 TD
- BAMA – Jake Coker – 21–27, 247 yards, 1 INT

Top rushers

- TENN – Jalen Hurd – 18 rushes, 92 yards, 1 TD
- BAMA – Derrick Henry – 28 rushes, 143 yards, 2 TD

Top receivers

- TENN – Alvin Kamara – 4 receptions, 44 yards; Josh Malone – 2 receptions, 43 yards; Josh Smith – 2 receptions, 38 yards
- BAMA – O. J. Howard – 7 receptions, 55 yards; ArDarius Stewart – 6 receptions, 114 yards; Calvin Ridley – 6 receptions, 62 yards

Tennessee entered Bryant–Denny Stadium to face their rivals, the eighth-ranked Alabama Crimson Tide. The 98th meeting between the teams resulted in Alabama winning 19–14 and extending their nine-game winning streak against the Volunteers. The defensive battle saw only two touchdowns from each team, with Alabama stopping a late rally by Tennessee by forcing a fumble from Joshua Dobbs.

Coach Butch Jones stated "I thought our team showed some grit, some determination and some resiliency on the road against a quality opponent, a top 10 opponent, in a hostile environment to go down and drive the ball and put us in a position to win. At the University of Tennessee, there are no moral victories."

=== Kentucky ===
Tennessee Volunteers at Kentucky Wildcats – Game summary

Quarter	1	2	3	4	Total
Tennessee	7	17	28	0	52
Kentucky	7	7	7	0	21

at Commonwealth Stadium • Lexington, Kentucky

- Date: October 31, 2015
- Game time: 7:30 p.m.
- Game weather: Temperature: 59 °F (15 °C) • Wind: 19 mph (31 km/h) • Weather: cloudy
- Game attendance: 60,886
- Referee: Brad Rogers • Umpire: Rick Lowe • Linesman: Jay Vines • Line judge: Will McDonald • Back judge: Michael Watson • Field judge: Grant Jackson • Side judge: Chris Jamison • Center judge: Kevin Vicknair
- TV announcers (SECN): Brent Musburger (play-by-play), Jesse Palmer (color) and Maria Taylor Hyatt (sidelines)

Game information

First quarter

- KENT C. Johnson 77-yd fumble return (A. MacGinnis kick), 8:23.
- TENN J. Dobbs 28-yd run (A. Medley kick), 2:45.

Second quarter

- TENN A. Medley 44-yd FG, 11:54.
- KENT P. Towles 1-yd run (A. MacGinnis kick), 5:39.
- TENN J. Dobbs 75-yd pass to J. Malone (A. Medley kick), 5:26.
- TENN J. Dobbs 1-yd run (A. Medley kick), 0:40.

Third quarter

- TENN J. Dobbs 37-yd pass to J. Hurd (A. Medley kick), 10:56.
- TENN J. Hurd 4-yd run (A. Medley kick), 10:14.
- KENT P. Towles 39-yd pass to G. Johnson (A. MacGinnis kick), 8:34.
- TENN E. Berry 100-yd kickoff return (A. Medley kick), 8:19.
- TENN C. Sutton 84-yd punt return, (A. Medley kick), 5:29.

Fourth quarter

Top passers

- TENN – Joshua Dobbs – 16–26, 233 yards, 2 TD, 1 INT
- KENT – Patrick Towles – 16–33, 184 yards, 1 TD, 1 INT

Top rushers

- TENN – Alvin Kamara – 4 rushes, 70 yards
- KENT – Mikel Horton – 14 rushes, 109 yards

Top receivers

- TENN – Josh Malone – 4 receptions, 103 yards, 1 TD
- KENT – Garrett Johnson – 2 receptions, 50 yards, 1 TD

Joshua Dobbs amassed four touchdowns in a 52–21 rout of the Kentucky Wildcats. The Volunteers have won 30 of its last 31 meetings with Kentucky. Evan Berry scored on a 100-yard kickoff return and Cameron Sutton returned an 84-yard punt for a touchdown. Berry's three touchdowns on kickoff returns this season ties Willie Gault's 35-year-old school single-season record. For his performance, Berry was awarded the SEC Special Teams Player of the Week.

=== South Carolina ===
South Carolina Gamecocks at Tennessee Volunteers – Game summary

Quarter	1	2	3	4	Total
South Carolina	0	3	21	0	24
Tennessee	14	3	7	3	27

at Neyland Stadium • Knoxville, Tennessee

- Date: November 7, 2015
- Game time: 4:00 p.m.
- Game weather: 56 °F (13 °C) • Wind: 4 mph (6.4 km/h) • Weather: cloudy
- Game attendance: 101,253
- Referee: Matt Austin • Umpire: Rodney Lawary • Linesman: Tim Sistrunk • Line judge: Michael Taylor • Back judge: Roy A. Potts • Field judge: Blake Parks • Side judge: Bobby Moreau • Center judge: Steve Marlowe
- TV announcers (SECN): Tom Hart (play–by–play), Andre Ware (color), Laura Rutledge (sideline)

Game information

First quarter

- TENN – A. Kamara 4-yd run (A. Medley kick), 11:57.
- TENN – J. Dobbs 37-yd pass to V. Pearson (A. Medley kick), 7:56.

Second quarter

- TENN – A. Medley 44-yd FG, 5:00.
- SCAR – E. Fry 43-yd FG, 1:03.

Third quarter

- SCAR – P. Orth 10-yd pass to J. Walton (E. Fry kick), 9:10.
- SCAR – P. Orth 7-yd pass to J. Adams (E. Fry kick), 8:29.
- TENN – J. Dobbs 11-yd pass to A. Kamara (A. Medley kick), 4:25.
- SCAR – P. Orth 5-yd pass to P. Cooper (E. Fry kick), 0:48.

Fourth quarter

- TENN – A. Medley 27-yd FG, 9:14.

Top passers

- SCAR – Perry Orth – 20–39, 233 yards, 3 TD
- TENN – Joshua Dobbs – 20–34, 255 yards, 2 TD, 1 INT

Top rushers

- SCAR – Brandon Wilds – 20 rushes, 79 yards
- TENN – Jalen Hurd – 23 rushes, 90 yards

Top receivers

- SCAR – Pharoh Cooper – 4 receptions, 47 yards, 1 TD; Jerell Adams – 2 receptions, 37 yards, 1 TD
- TENN – Von Pearson – 8 receptions, 121 yards, 1 TD; Josh Smith – 3 receptions, 42 yards; Alvin Kamara – 3 receptions, 27 yards, 1 TD

Tennessee won the 16th of its 18 home meetings against the South Carolina Gamecocks, 27–24. This marks the series' third consecutive game to be decided by a field goal, the third consecutive Tennessee comeback, and the sixth by three or fewer points. Malik Foreman forced a South Carolina fumble on Tennessee's 13-yard line and Jalen Reeves-Maybin recovered it to end the Gamecocks' 67-yard drive in the final minute. Following the game, Tennessee coach Butch Jones stated "I'm never going to apologize for winning. This is a hard-fought game. We're playing a good football team. I give South Carolina all the credit in the world. ... They're going to have success. We're still building. I'm proud of our players. I'm proud of our program. We need to start being positive around here."

=== North Texas ===
North Texas Mean Green at Tennessee Volunteers – Game summary

Quarter	1	2	3	4	Total
North Texas	0	0	0	0	0
Tennessee	7	10	0	7	24

at Neyland Stadium • Knoxville, Tennessee

- Date: November 14, 2015
- Game time: Noon
- Game weather: Temperature: 54 °F (12 °C) • Wind: 5 mph (8.0 km/h) • Weather: Sunny
- Game attendance: 96,197
- Referee: Tom Ritter • Umpire: Stan Weihe • Linesman: Johnny Crawford • Line judge: Tim Beard • Back judge: Dax Hill • Field judge: J. Taylor • Side judge: Ant. Jeffries • Center judge: James Carter
- TV announcers (SECN): Dave Neal (play-by-play), Matt Stinchcomb (color) and Kayce Smith (sidelines)

Game information

First quarter

- TENN – A. Kamara 27-yard run (A. Medley kick), 13:51.

Second quarter

- TENN – J. Hurd 1-yard run (A. Medley kick), 14:57.
- TENN – A. Medley 34-yard FG, 2:41.

Fourth quarter

- TENN – A. Kamara 15-yard run (A. Medley kick), 13:47.

Top passers

- UNT – DaMarcus Smith – 12–25, 103 yards
- TENN – Joshua Dobbs – 15–23, 136 yards, INT

Top rushers

- UNT – Jeffrey Wilson – 14 rushes, 52 yards
- TENN – Alvin Kamara – 15 rushes, 127 yards, 2 TD; Jalen Hurd – 15 rushes, 72 yards, 1 TD

Top receivers

- UNT – Marcus Smith – 5 receptions, 46 yards
- TENN – Josh Malone – 4 receptions, 38 yards

For this season's homecoming game, the Volunteers' defense allowed just 199 total yards (the fewest in a game since 2010) in a 24–0 victory over North Texas. Tennessee is now bowl eligible and on a three-game winning streak. However, the Volunteers' offense seemed sluggish, and the Mean Green remained competitive. Tennessee coach Butch Jones stated "There isn't a 'U' behind the 'W' that says 'ugly win'. They're all wins. We have to go back and we have to get better. We're going to be challenged the next couple weeks."

=== Missouri ===
Tennessee Volunteers at Missouri Tigers – game summary

Quarter	1	2	3	4	Total
Tennessee	6	10	3	0	19
Missouri	0	0	0	8	8

at Faurot Field • Columbia, Missouri

- Date: November 21, 2015
- Game time: 7:15 p.m.
- Game weather: Temperature: 28 °F (−2 °C) • Wind: variable, 10–18 mph (16–29 km/h) • Weather: clear
- Game attendance: 59,575
- Referee: Matt Austin • Umpire: Rodney Lawary • Linesman: Tim Sistrunk • Line judge: Michael Taylor • Back judge: Jimmy Russell • Field judge: Blake Parks • Side judge: Bobby Moreau • Center judge: James Carter
- TV announcers (ESPN2): Mark Jones (play-by-play), Greg McElroy (color) and Quint Kessenich (sidelines)

Game information

First quarter

- TENN – Aaron Medley 34-yard FG, 8:19.
- TENN – Aaron Medley 22-yard FG, 1:05.

Second quarter

- TENN – Aaron Medley 44-yard FG, 12:59.
- TENN – Joshua Dobbs 8-yard (Aaron Medley kick), 0:17.

Third quarter

- TENN – Aaron Medley 30-yard FG, 5:13.

Fourth quarter

- MISS – Drew Lock 1-yard run (Drew Lock pass to Jason Reese for two-point conversion), 9:49.

Top passers

- TENN – Joshua Dobbs – 16/24, 89 yards
- MISS – Drew Lock – 23/30, 135 yards, INT

Top rushers

- TENN – Jalen Hurd – 34 rushes, 151 yards
- MISS – Russell Hansbrough – 12 rushes, 41 yards

Top receivers

- TENN – Josh Malone – 2 receptions, 35 yards
- MISS – Wesley Leftwich – 2 receptions, 41 yards

In the final road game of the regular season, Jalen Hurd ran for a career-high 151 rushing yards and Aaron Medley made four field goals to lead Tennessee to a 19–8 win over Missouri at Faurot Field. Hurd's performance put him over 1,000 yards on the season. This is the Volunteers' first win between the teams since the Tigers joined the SEC in 2012. It was also Tennessee's seventh regular-season win, the first since 2009.

=== Vanderbilt ===
Vanderbilt Commodores at Tennessee Volunteers – Game summary

Quarter	1	2	3	4	Total
Vanderbilt	7	7	0	14	28
Tennessee	17	10	16	10	53

at Neyland Stadium • Knoxville, Tennessee

- Date: November 28, 2015
- Game time: 4:00 p.m.
- Game weather: Temperature: 64 °F (18 °C) • Wind: 1 mph (1.6 km/h) • Weather: cloudy
- Game attendance: 98,327
- Referee: Matt Loeffler • Umpire: Brent Sowell • Linesman: GA Gus Morris • Line judge: Michael Shirey • Back judge: Roy A. Potts • Field judge: Bobby Ables • Side judge: Jesse Dupuy • Center judge: James Carter
- TV announcers (SECN): Tom Hart (play-by-play), Andre Ware (color) & Laura Rutledge (sidelines)

Game information

First quarter

- TENN – J. Dobbs 17-yard pass to V. Pearson (A. Medley kick), 11:32.
- TENN – A. Medley 26-yard FG, 6:01.
- VAN – D. Sims 7-yard run (T. Openshaw kick), 4:50.
- TENN – J. Dobbs 6-yard run (A. Medley kick), 2:01.

Second quarter

- VAN – K. Shurmur 12-yard pass to T. Sherfield (T. Openshaw kick), 14:50.
- TENN – A. Medley 47-yard FG, 12:57.
- TENN – C. Sutton 85-yard punt return (A. Medley kick), 4:36.

Third quarter

- TENN – D. Barnett safety on K. Shurmur, 9:47.
- TENN – J. Hurd 14-yard run (A. Medley kick), 7:33.
- TENN – J. Dobbs 5-yard pass to V. Pearson, (A. Medley kick), 3:41.

Fourth quarter

- TENN – A. Medley 32-yard FG, 13:17.
- TENN – J. Young 8-yard run (G. Bullock kick), 8:06.
- VAN – K. Shurmur 3-yard pass to S. Scheu (T. Openshaw kick), 4:01.
- VAN – K. Shurmur 8-yard pass to D. Rivers (T. Openshaw kick), 0:22.

Top passers

- VAN – Kyle Shurmur – 15/34, 209 yards, 3 TD, INT
- TENN – Joshua Dobbs – 13/21, 140 yards, 2 TD

Top rushers

- VAN – Ralph Webb – 21 rushes, 149 yards
- TENN – Jalen Hurd – 19 rushes, 120 yards, TD

Top receivers

- VAN – Trent Sherfield – 6 receptions, 85 yards, TD
- TENN – Von Person – 3 receptions, 40 yards, 2 TD

In the final game of the regular season, Tennessee beat in-state rival Vanderbilt, 53–28. Joshua Dobbs threw two touchdowns and ran for another, Jalen Hurd scored a touchdown in his 109-yard performance, and Cameron Sutton scored on an 85-yard punt return. The win capped Tennessee's first five-game winning streak, and marked the first time winning at least eight games in a season, since 2007. Following the game, Coach Butch Jones called his team "one of the best teams in the country", adding "our players believe that. There's a lot of positive energy surrounding our program."

=== #13 Northwestern ===
#13 Northwestern Wildcats at #23 Tennessee Volunteers – Game summary

Quarter	1	2	3	4	Total
#13 Northwestern	0	6	0	0	6
#23 Tennessee	7	10	7	21	45

at Raymond James Stadium • Tampa, Florida

- Date: January 1, 2016
- Game time: 12:00 p.m.
- Game weather: Temperature: 79 °F (26 °C) • Wind: 5 mph (8.0 km/h) • Weather: Sunny
- Game attendance: 53,202
- Referee: Gary Patterson • Umpire: Terrance Ramsey • Linesman: Mike Kelly • Line judge: Rich Misner • Back judge: Gary Dancewicz • Field judge: Chris Junjulas • Side judge: Tony Tarantini • Center judge: Jim Eckl
- TV announcers (ESPN2): Mark Jones (play-by-play), Rod Gilmore (color), Quint Kessenich (sidelines)

Game information

First quarter

- TENN – Joshua Dobbs 14 Yd Run (Aaron Medley kick), 0:14.

Second quarter

- TENN – Aaron Medley 35 Yd Field Goal, 10:47.
- NW – Justin Jackson 5 Yd Run (Jack Mitchell PAT failed), 5:40.
- TENN – Alvin Kamara 11 Yd Run (Aaron Medley kick), 2:18.

Third quarter

- TENN – Jalen Hurd 3 Yd Run (Aaron Medley kick), 4:40.

Fourth quarter

- TENN – Joshua Dobbs 18 Yd Run (Aaron Medley kick), 11:42.
- TENN – John Kelly run for 1 yd for a TD (Aaron Medley kick), 4:24.
- TENN – Zack Oliver pass intercepted for a TD, Evan Berry return for 99 yds for a TD, 0:08.

Top passers

- NW – Clayton Thorson – 8/20, 57 yards, 2 INT
- TENN – Joshua Dobbs – 14/25, 166 yards

Top rushers

- NW – Justin Jackson – 14 rushes, 74 yards, TD
- TENN – Jalen Hurd – 24 rushes, 130 yards, TD

Top receivers

- NW – Pierre Youngblood-Ary – 2 receptions, 33 yards
- TENN – Alex Ellis – 3 receptions, 74 yards

== Rankings ==
Ranking movements Legend: ██ Increase in ranking ██ Decrease in ranking — = Not ranked RV = Received votes
	Week															
Poll	Pre	1	2	3	4	5	6	7	8	9	10	11	12	13	14	Final
AP	25	23	RV	RV	RV	—	—	—	—	RV	—	—	RV	RV	RV	22
Coaches	25	23	RV	RV	RV	—	RV	—	—	—	—	—	—	RV	RV	23
CFP	Not released									—	—	—	—	25	23	Not released
