= Evan Berry =

American football player (born 1995)

No. 29
- Position: Wide receiver

Personal information
- Born: November 4, 1995 (age 31); Fairburn, Georgia, U.S.
- Listed height: 5 ft 11 in (1.80 m)
- Listed weight: 207 lb (94 kg)

Career information
- High school: Creekside (Fairburn)
- College: Tennessee
- NFL draft: 2018: undrafted

Career history
- Cleveland Browns (2018)*
- * Offseason or practice squad member only

Awards and highlights
- Consensus All-American (2015); SEC Special Teams Player of the Year (2015); First-team All-SEC (2015); Second-team All-SEC (2016)

Evan Lawrence Berry (born November 4, 1995) is an American former football player. He played college football for the Tennessee Volunteers. While primarily a safety, he was selected to All-America team as a return specialist in 2015. He is the younger brother of former Tennessee Volunteers and former NFL safety Eric Berry, and his twin brother, Elliott, also played at Tennessee.

== College career ==
Berry attended and played college football at the University of Tennessee from 2014–2017 under head coach Butch Jones.

In his freshman year in 2014, Berry split kickoff return duties with Devrin Young while Cameron Sutton and Jacob Carter dealt with the punt returning duties. He averaged 29.5 yards per return on 14 attempts on the season.

Berry's sophomore season in 2015 was very productive. He handled most of the kick return duties on the season while Sutton and Alvin Kamara handled punt returns. In the season opener against Bowling Green, he had a 67-yard kickoff return. Two weeks later, against Western Carolina, he had an 88-yard kickoff return for a touchdown. On October 3, against Arkansas, he returned the opening kickoff 96 yards for a touchdown. On October 31, against Kentucky, he had a 100-yard kickoff return for his third of the season. In the Outback Bowl, against Northwestern, he had a 100-yard interception return for a touchdown to end the 45–6 victory for the Volunteers. Overall, on the season, he averaged an NCAA-leading 38.3 yards per kick return on 21 attempts. His 804 total kickoff return yards and three kickoff return touchdowns led the SEC in 2015. For the 2015 season, Berry earned Consensus All-American honors.

In his junior season in 2016, Berry was the primary kick return until suffering a knee injury against Tennessee Tech, which kept him out of the remainder of the season. He recorded a 100-yard kickoff return for a touchdown against South Carolina. Overall, he averaged a SEC-leading 32.9 yards per kick return on 14 attempts.

Berry's final season with the Volunteers was limited to only two games due to his prior injury. He totaled four kick returns for a 35.8 average.

For his collegiate career, Berry finished first in NCAA and SEC history with 34.3 kickoff return yards per attempt and his four return touchdowns are tied for the most in SEC history.

=== Collegiate statistics ===
Year	School	Conf	Class	Pos	G	Kick returns			
Year	School	Conf	Class	Pos	G	Ret	Yds	Avg	TD
2014	Tennessee	SEC	FR	DB	8	14	413	29.5	0
2015	Tennessee	SEC	SO	DB	13	21	804	38.3	3
2016	Tennessee	SEC	JR	DB	8	14	460	32.9	1
2017	Tennessee	SEC	SR	DB	2	4	143	35.8	0
Career	Tennessee					53	1,820	34.3	4

== Professional career ==
After going undrafted in the 2018 NFL draft, Berry signed a free agent contract with the Cleveland Browns. He was waived on August 28, 2018.
