= 2016 Outback Bowl =

- 30th Outback Bowl
Northwestern Wildcats	Tennessee Volunteers
(10–2)	(8–4)
Big Ten	SEC
6	45
Head coach: Pat Fitzgerald	Head coach: Butch Jones
AP / Coaches / CFP; 12 / 12 / 13	AP / Coaches / CFP; NR / NR / 23
	1	2	3	4	Total
Northwestern	0	6	0	0	6
Tennessee	7	10	7	21	45
- Date: January 1, 2016
- Season: 2015
- Stadium: Raymond James Stadium
- Location: Tampa, Florida
- MVP: Jalen Hurd
- Favorite: Tennessee by 8
- Referee: Gary Patterson (ACC)
- Attendance: 53,202

United States TV coverage
- Network: ESPN2/Sports USA
- Announcers: Mark Jones, Rod Gilmore, & Quint Kessenich (ESPN2); Mike Morgan, Doug Plank, & Rich Herrera (Sports USA)

The 2016 Outback Bowl was an American college football bowl game that was played on January 1, 2016, at Raymond James Stadium in Tampa, Florida. It was the 30th edition of the Outback Bowl (previously called the Hall of Fame Bowl), featuring the #13 Northwestern Wildcats from the Big Ten and the #23 Tennessee Volunteers from the SEC. It was one of the 2015–16 bowl games that concluded the 2015 FBS football season, with kickoff at noon EST on ESPN2. It was sponsored by the Outback Steakhouse restaurant franchise.

== Teams ==
=== Northwestern ===
Northwestern, ranked #13 in the nation, finished the regular season with a 10–2 record, losing two consecutive games mid-season to ranked teams, Michigan and Iowa. The Wildcats finished second in the Big Ten's western division behind Iowa. Northwestern was led by quarterback Clayton Thorson, with support from runningback Justin Jackson. Pat Fitzgerald was in his tenth year as Northwestern's head coach.

=== Tennessee ===
After starting the season ranked as high as #23 in the country, Tennessee went 3–4, losing two of three close games to higher-ranked teams and having fourth-quarter leads in all four losses, before winning their last five games of the season. The Volunteers won against then-ranked #19 Georgia and lost only one game in the remainder of the SEC schedule, which was to eventual National Champion Alabama. Tennessee is led by quarterback Joshua Dobbs, with support from running backs Jalen Hurd and Alvin Kamara, as well as Evan Berry and Cameron Sutton on special teams. The Volunteers are coached by Butch Jones in his third year.

=== Series history ===
In their only series game, the 1997 Florida Citrus Bowl, Tennessee won 48–28.

== Game summary ==
=== Scoring summary ===
Scoring summary

Quarter	Time	Drive			Team	Scoring information	Score	
Quarter	Time	Plays	Yards	TOP	Team	Scoring information	NU	UT
1	0:14	7	75	2:45	UT	Joshua Dobbs 14-yard touchdown run, Aaron Medley kick good	0	7
2	10:47	11	46	3:25	UT	35-yard field goal by Aaron Medley	0	10
2	5:40	12	75	5:07	NU	Justin Jackson 5-yard touchdown run, Jack Mitchell kick no good	6	10
2	2:18	9	75	3:22	UT	Alvin Kamara 11-yard touchdown run, Aaron Medley kick good	6	17
3	4:40	14	67	5:47	UT	Jalen Hurd 3-yard touchdown run, Aaron Medley kick good	6	24
4	11:42	9	80	3:36	UT	Joshua Dobbs 18-yard touchdown run, Aaron Medley kick good	6	31
4	4:24	7	32	3:38	UT	John Kelly 1-yard touchdown run, Aaron Medley kick good	6	38
4	0:08	–	–	–	UT	Interception returned 100 yards for touchdown by Evan Berry, Aaron Medley kick good	6	45
"TOP" = time of possession. For other American football terms, see Glossary of American football.							6	45

=== Statistics ===
Statistics	NU	UT
First downs	18	24
Plays–yards	70–261	84–420
Rushes–yards	37–132	53–226
Passing yards	129	194
Passing: Comp–Att–Int	14–33–4	16–30–0
Time of possession	25:51	34:09
