= Curt Maggitt =

American football player (born 1993)

No. 96
- Position: Linebacker

Personal information
- Born: February 4, 1993 (age 33); West Palm Beach, Florida, U.S.
- Listed height: 6 ft 3 in (1.91 m)
- Listed weight: 250 lb (113 kg)

Career information
- High school: William T. Dwyer (Palm Beach Gardens, Florida)
- College: Tennessee
- NFL draft: 2016: undrafted

Career history
- Indianapolis Colts (2016); Saskatchewan Roughriders (2018)

Awards and highlights
- Second-team All-SEC (2014)

Career NFL statistics
- Total tackles: 7
- Stats at Pro Football Reference
- Stats at CFL.ca

Curt Maggitt (/məˈdʒɪt/ mə-JIT; born February 4, 1993) is an American former professional football player who was a linebacker in the National Football League (NFL) and Canadian Football League (CFL). He played college football for the Tennessee Volunteers and signed with the Indianapolis Colts as an undrafted free agent in 2016.

== Early life ==
Maggitt attended and played high school football at William T. Dwyer High School. He played for the Panthers under head coach Jack Daniels. For his senior season, he was named the Sun Sentinel's Palm Beach County Defensive Player of the Year.

== College career ==
Maggitt attended and played college football at the University of Tennessee from 2011–2015 under head coaches Derek Dooley and Butch Jones. In the 2011 season, he started eight games at strong-side linebacker as a true freshman. As a sophomore in 2012, he started nine games. In the season opener against NC State, he was credited with an 18-yard sack and forced a fumble that resulted in a safety. In the 4OT loss to Missouri, he suffered a torn ACL and was out for the remainder of the season. He took a redshirt year for the 2013 season to recover. He returned from his injuries and started in ten games in the 2014 season. On the year, he recorded 11 sacks on the season, 48 total tackles, and one forced fumble. In the 2015 season, he started the first two games but suffered a hip injury which sidelined him for the rest of the season. Maggitt declined to seek a sixth year of collegiate eligibility and declared for the NFL Draft.

=== Statistics ===
Curt Maggitt					Defense						
Year	School	Class	Pos	G	Solo	Ast	Tot	Loss	Sk	PD	FF
2011	Tennessee	FR	LB	11	29	27	56	5.5	0.5	0	1
2012	Tennessee	SO	LB	9	16	14	30	5.0	2.0	1	2
2014	Tennessee	JR	DL	13	34	14	48	15.0	11.0	0	1
2015	Tennessee	SR	LB	2	4	3	7	3.0	0.0	0	0
Career	Tennessee			35	83	58	141	28.5	13.5	1	4

== Professional career ==
=== Indianapolis Colts ===
Maggit was signed by the Colts as an undrafted free agent on May 2, 2016. He made the Colts' 53-man roster as a rookie playing in nine games registering seven tackles before being placed on injured reserve on December 12, 2016. On May 12, 2017, the Colts waived Maggitt after reaching an injury settlement.

=== Saskatchewan Roughriders ===
On May 20, 2018, Maggitt was signed by the Saskatchewan Roughriders. He played in nine games. He was released by the team prior to the 2019 season.

== Personal life ==
Curt is the son of Roosevelt Maggitt, Sr. and Marilyn Bivins. Curt's brother, Roosevelt Jr., played defensive end at Iowa State.
