= 2015 South Carolina Gamecocks football team =

American college football season

2015 South Carolina Gamecocks football
- Conference: Southeastern Conference
- East Division
- Record: 3–9 (1–7 SEC)
- Head coach: Steve Spurrier (11th season; first 6 games); Shawn Elliott (interim; remainder of season)
- Offensive coordinator: G. A. Mangus (1st season)
- Offensive scheme: Fun and gun
- Co-defensive coordinators: Lorenzo Ward (4th season); Jon Hoke (1st season)
- Base defense: 4–2–5
- Home stadium: Williams–Brice Stadium; Tiger Stadium (1 game)

2015 Southeastern Conference football standings
	Conf.			Overall
Team	W		L	W		L
Eastern Division
No. 25 Florida x	7	–	1	10	–	4
No. 22 Tennessee	5	–	3	9	–	4
Georgia	5	–	3	10	–	3
Vanderbilt	2	–	6	4	–	8
Kentucky	2	–	6	5	–	7
Missouri*	1	–	7	5	–	7
South Carolina	1	–	7	3	–	9
Western Division
No. 1 Alabama x$#^	7	–	1	14	–	1
No. 10 Ole Miss	6	–	2	10	–	3
Arkansas	5	–	3	8	–	5
No. 16 LSU *	5	–	3	9	–	3
Texas A&M	4	–	4	8	–	5
Mississippi State	4	–	4	9	–	4
Auburn	2	–	6	7	–	6
Championship: Alabama 29, Florida 15
# – College Football Playoff champion; ^ – College Football Playoff participant; $ – Conference champion; x – Division champion/co-champions; * LSU and Missouri vacated all wins due to NCAA violations.; Rankings from AP Poll

The 2015 South Carolina Gamecocks football team represented the University of South Carolina in the 2015 NCAA Division I FBS football season. The Gamecocks competed as a member of the Southeastern Conference (SEC) as part of its East Division. The team was led by head coach Steve Spurrier, who was in his eleventh year before his resignation on October 12, 2015, after a 2–4 start. Co-offensive coordinator Shawn Elliott took over as interim head coach. They played six home games at Williams–Brice Stadium in Columbia, South Carolina and one home game at Tiger Stadium in Baton Rouge, Louisiana. (Note: The 2015 South Carolina-LSU game was originally scheduled to take place in Williams–Brice Stadium. However, due to catastrophic flooding in South Carolina indirectly caused by Hurricane Joaquin, the game was moved to LSU's home stadium. The Gamecocks were still technically considered, and treated as, the home team. The LSU band played South Carolina's fight song and alma mater, while Tiger Stadium played Also sprach Zarathustra before the Gamecocks' entrance as well as "Sandstorm" before their opening kickoff. LSU only brought seventy players, as mandated by the SEC for "visitors". Tiger fans applauded the Gamecocks as they took and left the field. All profits from the game went towards relief efforts.) They finished the season 3–9, 1–7 in SEC play to finish in seventh place in the East division.

The Gamecocks had their first losing season since 2003 and their worst record since 1999. The upset by The Citadel was the first time an SEC team had lost to an FCS team since 2013. It was South Carolina's first loss to a FCS team since 1990, and it remains the most recent. The Gamecocks' loss to archrival No. 1 Clemson was the second in a row, and the first in Williams–Brice Stadium since 2007.

== Schedule ==
South Carolina announced their 2015 football schedule on October 14, 2014. The 2015 schedule consisted of 7 home games, 4 away games and 1 neutral game in the regular season. The Gamecocks hosted SEC foes Florida, Kentucky, LSU, and Vanderbilt, and traveled to Georgia, Missouri, Tennessee, and Texas A&M.

The Gamecocks hosted three of the four non–conference play against UCF, the Citadel and in-state rival Clemson. South Carolina traveled to play North Carolina at a neutral site in Charlotte, North Carolina. The Gamecocks traveled to College Station, Texas, for the first time ever on Halloween. They were set to host LSU at home but the contest was relocated to Baton Rouge as a consequence of severe flooding in Columbia, South Carolina. On October 13, 2015, Steve Spurrier officially announced his resignation as head football coach, and co-offensive coordinator Shawn Elliott was named interim head coach for the remaining games of the season.

Date	Time	Opponent	Site	TV	Result	Attendance
September 3	6:00 p.m.	vs. North Carolina*	Bank of America Stadium; Charlotte, NC (Belk Kickoff Game/Battle of the Carolinas)	ESPN	W 17–13	51,664
September 12	7:30 p.m.	Kentucky	Williams-Brice Stadium; Columbia, SC	SECN	L 22–26	82,178
September 19	6:00 p.m.	at No. 7 Georgia	Sanford Stadium; Athens, GA (rivalry)	ESPN	L 20–52	92,746
September 26	Noon	UCF*	Williams-Brice Stadium; Columbia, SC	ESPNU	W 31–14	78,411
October 3	Noon	at Missouri	Faurot Field; Columbia, MO	SECN	L 10–24 ‡	66,751
October 10	3:30 p.m.	No. 7 LSU	Tiger Stadium; Baton Rouge, LA	ESPN	L 24–45 ‡	42,058
October 17	4:00 p.m.	Vanderbilt^{†}	Williams-Brice Stadium; Columbia, SC	SECN	W 19–10	75,159
October 31	Noon	at Texas A&M	Kyle Field; College Station, TX	SECN	L 28–35	102,154
November 7	4:00 p.m.	at Tennessee	Neyland Stadium; Knoxville, TN (rivalry)	SECN	L 24–27	101,253
November 14	Noon	No. 11 Florida	Williams-Brice Stadium; Columbia, SC	ESPN	L 14–24	78,536
November 21	Noon	No. 25 (FCS) The Citadel*	Williams-Brice Stadium; Columbia, SC (SEC Nation)	SECN	L 22–23	77,241
November 28	Noon	No. 1 Clemson*	Williams-Brice Stadium; Columbia, SC (Palmetto Bowl)	ESPN	L 32–37	81,409
*Non-conference game; ^{†}Homecoming; Rankings from AP Poll released prior to game; All times are in Eastern time

Schedule source:

‡ As part of their penalties for NCAA violations, Missouri and LSU have retroactively vacated their 2015 victories over South Carolina. However, the penalty to vacate victories does not result in a loss (or forfeiture) of the affected game or award a victory to the opponent, therefore South Carolina still considers the game a loss in their official records.

== Season summary ==
=== at LSU ===
South Carolina Gamecocks (2–3) at No. 7 LSU Tigers (4–0) – Game summary

Quarter	1	2	3	4	Total
Gamecocks	3	7	14	0	24
No. 7 Tigers	7	10	21	7	45

at Tiger Stadium • Baton Rouge, Louisiana

- Date: October 10, 2015
- Game time: 3:30 p.m. EST
- Game attendance: 43,101

Game information

First Quarter

- SC – Elliott Fry 21 Yd Field Goal, 11:02. South Carolina 3–0. Drive: 13 plays, 62 yards, 3:58.
- LSU – Darrel Williams 4 Yd Run (Trent Domingue Kick), 5:15. LSU 7–3. Drive: 3 plays, 75 yards, 5:47.

Second Quarter

- LSU – Malachi Dupre 10 Yd pass from Brandon Harris (Trent Domingue Kick), 7:41. LSU 14–3. Drive: 11 plays, 67 yards, 5:42.
- SC – Rashad Fenton 96 Yd Kickoff Return (Elliott Fry Kick), 7:27. LSU 14–10. Driver: 0 plays, 0 yards, 0:00.
- LSU – Trent Domingue 29 Yd Field Goal, 0:00. LSU 17–10. Drive: 10 plays, 54 yards, 1:19.

Third Quarter

- LSU – Leonard Fournette 87 Yd Run (Trent Domingue Kick), 14:01. LSU 24–10. Drive: 2 plays, 90 yards, 0:51.
- LSU – Travin Dural 62 Yd pass from Brandon Harris (Trent Domingue Kick), 6:29. LSU 31–10. Drive: 10 plays, 80 yards, 6:11.
- SC – Jerell Adams 36 Yd pass from Perry Orth (Elliott Fry Kick), 5:02. LSU 31–17. Driver: 5 plays, 60 yards, 1:21.
- LSU – Darrel Williams 1 Yd Run (Trent Domingue Kick), 1:55. LSU 38–17. Drive: 6 plays, 75 yards, 3:07.
- SC – Pharoh Cooper 43 Yd pass from Perry Orth (Elliott Fry Kick), 0:39. LSU 38–24. Driver: 3 plays, 61 yards, 1:14.

Fourth Quarter

- LSU – Derrius Guice 4 Yd Run (Trent Domingue Kick), 13:15. LSU 45–24. Drive: 6 plays, 67 yards, 2:13.

Top Passers

- SC − Perry Orth – 14/28, 200 yds, 2 TD, 1 INT
- LSU − Brandon Harris – 18/28, 228 yds, 2 TD

Top Rushers

- SC − Shon Carson – 16 carries, 26 yds
- LSU − Derrius Guice – 16 carries, 161 yds, 1 TD

Top Receiving

- SC − Pharoh Cooper – 7 receptions, 105 yds, 1 TD
- LSU − Travin Dural – 4 reception, 109 yds, 1 TD

=== Florida ===
#11 Florida Gators (8–1) at South Carolina Gamecocks (3–6)

Quarter	1	2	3	4	Total
Florida	7	7	3	7	24
South Carolina	0	0	0	14	14

at Williams-Brice Stadium, Columbia, South Carolina

- Date: November 14, 2015
- Game time: 12:01 p.m. EST
- Game weather: Sunny • 53 °F (12 °C) • Wind Variable
- Game attendance: 78,536
- Referee: David Smith
- TV announcers (ESPN): Mike Patrick and Ed Cunningham
- Boxscore

Game information

First quarter

- FLA – Jordan Cronkrite 3-yard run (Austin Hardin kick), 1:50. Florida 7–0. Drive: 15 plays, 87 yards, 6:38.

Second quarter

- FLA – Jordan Cronkrite 41-yard pass from Treon Harris (Austin Hardin kick), 8:17. Florida 14–0. Drive: 12 plays, 76 yards, 7:11.

Third quarter

- FLA – Austin Hardin 39-yard field goal, 4:50. Florida 17–0. Drive: 12 plays, 70 yards, 6:20.

Fourth quarter

- SCAR – Perry Orth 17-yard pass from Pharoh Cooper (Elliott Fry kick), 8:59. Florida 17–7. Drive: 8 plays, 64 yards, 3:17.
- SCAR – Pharoh Cooper 38-yard pass from Perry Orth (Elliott Fry kick), 4:49. Florida 17–14. Drive: 5 plays, 79 yards, 1:58.
- FLA – Kelvin Taylor 1-yard run (Austin Hardin kick), 2:01. Florida 24–14. Drive: 6 plays, 75 yards, 2:48.

Top passers

- FLA – Treon Harris – 19/33, 256 yards, TD, 2 INT
- SCAR – Perry Orth – 13/24, 163 yards, TD, 2 INT

Top rushers

- FLA – Kelvin Taylor – 20 rushes, 105 yards, TD
- SCAR – Pharoh Cooper – 3 rushes, 16 yards

Top receivers

- FLA – Antonio Callaway – 5 receptions, 60 yards
- SCAR – Jerell Adams – 4 receptions, 46 yards

== See also ==
- October 2015 North American storm complex
- 2005 LSU Tigers football team
- 2005 Tulane Green Wave football team
