= LaTroy Lewis =

American football player (born 1993)

Personal information
- Born: November 9, 1993 (age 32); Akron, Ohio, U.S.
- Listed height: 6 ft 4 in (1.93 m)
- Listed weight: 254 lb (115 kg)

Career information
- Position: Linebacker (No. 4, 46, 54, 45)
- High school: Archbishop Hoban (Akron)
- College: Tennessee (2012–2016)
- NFL draft: 2017: undrafted

Career history

Playing
- Oakland Raiders (2017)*; Houston Texans (2017); Tennessee Titans (2018); Houston Roughnecks (2020)
- * Offseason or practice squad member only

Coaching
- Akron (2020) Graduate assistant; South Alabama (2021) Graduate assistant; Wake Forest (2022) Special teams analyst; Michigan (2023–2024) Graduate assistant; Toledo (2025) Defensive line coach; Atlanta Falcons (2026) Assistant defensive line coach (fired before season)

Career NFL statistics
- Total tackles: 3
- Sacks: 1
- Stats at Pro Football Reference

LaTroy Rayshawn Lewis (born November 9, 1993) is an American former professional football player who was a linebacker in the National Football League (NFL). He played college football for the Tennessee Volunteers.

== Early life ==
Lewis attended Archbishop Hoban High School in Akron, Ohio. He played high school football for the Knights football team under head coach Ralph Orsini. As a sophomore, he recorded 70 tackles, eight tackles for loss, 13 sacks, and an interception. He earned Associated Press First-team All-Ohio, First-team All-Region and First-team All-Akron honors. As a junior, he earned Associated Press First-team All-Ohio, First-team All-Region and First-team All-Akron honors as well after recording 96 tackles and nine sacks. In addition to football, Lewis was an All- North Coast League basketball and track athlete in high school as well.

Lewis committed to playing college football under Derek Dooley at the University of Tennessee.

== College career ==
Lewis redshirted in the 2012 season, his lone season with head coach Derek Dooley.

Lewis started the 2013 season with a new head coach, Butch Jones, after Dooley was fired the previous year. He made his collegiate debut in the season opener at home against Austin Peay at Neyland Stadium. In his first season as a contributor to the Vols, Lewis recorded four total tackles.

As a redshirt sophomore in 2014, Lewis started the season with a solid performance at home against Utah State. Against the Aggies, he recorded his first career sack. Against the Chattanooga Mocs on October 11, he had a season-high three total tackles in the home victory. He had eight total tackles, of which five were for loss, one sack, one pass defensed, and one forced fumble.

In his redshirt junior season in 2015, Lewis was a solid contributor. On October 10, he had a season-high five total tackles in Tennessee's upset victory at home over the ranked Georgia Bulldogs. Against Vanderbilt at home, Lewis recorded his first and only sack of the season. In the 2015 season, Lewis had 29 total tackles, of which two were for loss, one sack, one pass defensed, and one forced fumble.

In his redshirt senior season with the Volunteers in 2016, Lewis put together a solid season on a defensive unit plagued with injuries. Overall, in the 2016 season, he recorded 36 total tackles, of which four were for loss, 2.5 sacks, and one fumble recovery.

== Professional playing career ==
=== Oakland Raiders ===
Lewis signed with the Oakland Raiders as an undrafted free agent on May 8, 2017. In the third game of the preseason, against the Dallas Cowboys, Lewis recovered a fumble for a 65-yard touchdown in the third quarter. He was waived by the Raiders on September 2.

=== Houston Texans ===
On September 4, 2017, Lewis was signed to the Houston Texans' practice squad. He was promoted to the active roster on November 29.

On September 1, 2018, Lewis was waived by the Texans.

=== Tennessee Titans ===
On October 2, 2018, Lewis was signed to the Tennessee Titans' practice squad. He was promoted to the active roster on December 24.

On August 31, 2019, Lewis was waived by the Titans.

=== Houston Roughnecks ===
On November 22, 2019, Lewis was selected by the Houston Roughnecks in the 2020 XFL Supplemental Draft. He had his contract terminated when the league suspended operations on April 10, 2020.

== Coaching career ==
=== Michigan ===
On February 21, 2022, Lewis began working as a graduate assistant at the University of Michigan. Lewis was part of the Michigan staff that won the National Championship in the 2023 season.

=== Toledo ===
On February 25, 2025, LaTroy Lewis was hired as the defensive line coach at the University of Toledo.

=== Atlanta Falcons ===
Lewis left Toledo on February 10, 2026 to accept a position as the assistant defensive line coach for the NFL's Atlanta Falcons, but was fired on February 27 amidst allegations of sexual assault during his time coaching at Michigan.
