= Kahlil McKenzie =

American football player (born 1997)

No. 69
- Positions: Guard, defensive tackle

Personal information
- Born: January 3, 1997 (age 29); Green Bay, Wisconsin, U.S.
- Listed height: 6 ft 3 in (1.91 m)
- Listed weight: 326 lb (148 kg)

Career information
- High school: Clayton Valley Charter (Concord, California)
- College: Tennessee
- NFL draft: 2018: 6th round, 198th overall pick

Career history
- Kansas City Chiefs (2018); Seattle Seahawks (2019)*; DC Defenders (2020)*; Los Angeles Wildcats (2020); Seattle Seahawks (2020)*; Cincinnati Bengals (2020); Baltimore Ravens (2021–2022); Vegas Vipers (2023); St. Louis Battlehawks (2024)*
- * Offseason or practice squad member only

Career NFL statistics
- Total tackles: 12
- Stats at Pro Football Reference

Reginald Kahlil McKenzie Jr. (born January 3, 1997) is an American former professional football player who was an offensive guard and defensive tackle in the National Football League (NFL). He played college football for the Tennessee Volunteers. McKenzie was selected by the Kansas City Chiefs in the sixth round of the 2018 NFL draft.

== Early life ==
Born and raised in Green Bay, Wisconsin, where his father worked as director of player personnel for the Green Bay Packers, McKenzie attended Green Bay Southwest High School until his sophomore year. Coached by Bryce Paup, the Fighting Trojans finished 10–1, losing only to Homestead in the third round of the WIAA Division 2 playoffs, in 2012. As his father joined the Oakland Raiders front office, Kahlil McKenzie transferred to De La Salle High School in Concord, California, for his junior year, registering 74 tackles and a team-high 12 sacks for the season. In June 2014, McKenzie decided to transfer to neighboring Clayton Valley Charter High School, citing personal reasons. The CIF North Coast Section commissioner Gil Lemmon decided the transfer was athletically motivated, and ruled McKenzie ineligible for the 2014 football season.

Regarded as a four-star recruit by ESPN, McKenzie was ranked as the No. 5 defensive tackle prospect in the class of 2015, behind Terry Beckner, Trenton Thompson, Daylon Mack, and Tim Settle. He committed to Tennessee, his father's alma mater, over Arizona in July 2014.

== College career ==
McKenzie played college football at Tennessee from 2015 to 2017 under head coach Butch Jones. He debuted in the 2015 season opener against the Bowling Green Falcons at Nissan Stadium in Nashville, Tennessee. He made his first collegiate tackle in the 31–24 2OT loss to the Oklahoma Sooners in the next game. On November 21, in a 19–8 victory over the Missouri Tigers, he recorded his first collegiate sack. His production in the 2016 season declined due to a pectoral muscle suffered against Alabama in his first career start. He returned from his injury in the 2017 season and recorded 35 total tackles and two sacks.

== Professional career ==
Pre-draft measurables
Height	Weight	Arm length	Hand span	40-yard dash	10-yard split	20-yard split	20-yard shuttle	Three-cone drill	Vertical jump	Broad jump	Bench press
6 ft 2 3/4 in (1.90 m)	314 lb (142 kg)	31 1/2 in (0.80 m)	10 1/8 in (0.26 m)	5.15 s	1.78 s	2.98 s	4.62 s	7.69 s	29.5 in (0.75 m)	8 ft 9 in (2.67 m)	26 reps
All values from NFL Combine/Pro Day

=== Kansas City Chiefs ===
McKenzie was selected by the Kansas City Chiefs in the sixth round (198th overall) of the 2018 NFL draft. After being drafted as a defensive tackle, the Chiefs announced their intent to move him to guard.

On August 31, 2019, McKenzie was waived by the Chiefs.

=== Seattle Seahawks (first stint) ===
On September 2, 2019, McKenzie was signed to the practice squad of the Seattle Seahawks. His practice squad contract with the team expired on January 20, 2020.

=== Los Angeles Wildcats ===
McKenzie signed with the DC Defenders of the XFL on January 20, 2020, but was immediately traded to the Los Angeles Wildcats in a three-team trade the same day. He was placed on injured reserve on February 22, 2020. He had his contract terminated when the league suspended operations on April 10, 2020.

=== Seattle Seahawks (second stint) ===
On April 20, 2020, McKenzie was signed by the Seattle Seahawks. He was waived on July 26, 2020.

=== Cincinnati Bengals ===
McKenzie had a tryout with the Green Bay Packers on August 17, 2020, and with the Cincinnati Bengals on August 23, 2020. He signed with the Bengals two days later. He was waived on September 5, 2020, and signed to the practice squad the next day. He was elevated to the active roster on September 26 and October 10 for the team's weeks 3 and 5 games against the Philadelphia Eagles and Baltimore Ravens, and reverted to the practice squad after each game. He was promoted to the active roster on October 17. He was waived on October 24, and re-signed to the practice squad two days later. He was elevated to the active roster on November 14, December 6, and December 12 for the team's weeks 10, 13, and 14 games against the Pittsburgh Steelers, Miami Dolphins, and Dallas Cowboys, and reverted to the practice squad after each game. On January 2, 2021, he was signed to the active roster.

On August 31, 2021, McKenzie was waived by the Bengals.

=== Baltimore Ravens ===
On September 8, 2021, McKenzie signed with the Ravens' practice squad. On September 25, 2021, McKenzie was temporarily elevated to the active roster as a COVID-19 replacement in advance of the Ravens' Week 3 win over the Detroit Lions, in which McKenzie made his debut and recorded 2 tackles in 15 snaps. On October 22, 2021, Ravens head coach John Harbaugh confirmed that McKenzie was being "cross-trained" to play as an offensive lineman as well as a defensive lineman. He was signed to the active roster on November 20, 2021. He was released on November 22, 2021, and re-signed to the practice squad the next day. He signed a reserve/future contract with the Ravens on January 10, 2022.

On August 30, 2022, McKenzie was released by the Ravens and signed to the practice squad the next day.

=== Vegas Vipers ===
McKenzie was placed on the reserve list by the Vegas Vipers of the XFL on March 9, 2023. The Vipers folded when the XFL and United States Football League merged to create the United Football League (UFL).

=== St. Louis Battlehawks ===
On January 15, 2024, McKenzie was selected by the St. Louis Battlehawks in the seventh round of the Super Draft portion during the 2024 UFL dispersal draft. He was waived on February 8, 2024. McKenzie announced his retirement on Instagram on February 11, 2024.

== Personal life ==
McKenzie is the son of former NFL linebacker and Miami Dolphins senior personnel executive Reggie McKenzie and nephew of former NFL guard Raleigh McKenzie. His brother, Jalen McKenzie, was a four star recruit who committed to USC on January 16, 2017. A three year starter at USC, Jalen declared for the 2022 NFL draft on December 6, 2021.
