= 2015 Kentucky Wildcats football team =

American college football season

2015 Kentucky Wildcats football
- Conference: Southeastern Conference
- Eastern Division
- Record: 5–7 (2–6 SEC)
- Head coach: Mark Stoops (3rd season)
- Offensive coordinator: Shannon Dawson (1st season)
- Offensive scheme: Air raid
- Defensive coordinator: D. J. Eliot (3rd season)
- Base defense: 3–4
- Home stadium: Commonwealth Stadium

2015 Southeastern Conference football standings
	Conf.			Overall
Team	W		L	W		L
Eastern Division
No. 25 Florida x	7	–	1	10	–	4
No. 22 Tennessee	5	–	3	9	–	4
Georgia	5	–	3	10	–	3
Vanderbilt	2	–	6	4	–	8
Kentucky	2	–	6	5	–	7
Missouri*	1	–	7	5	–	7
South Carolina	1	–	7	3	–	9
Western Division
No. 1 Alabama x$#^	7	–	1	14	–	1
No. 10 Ole Miss	6	–	2	10	–	3
Arkansas	5	–	3	8	–	5
No. 16 LSU *	5	–	3	9	–	3
Texas A&M	4	–	4	8	–	5
Mississippi State	4	–	4	9	–	4
Auburn	2	–	6	7	–	6
Championship: Alabama 29, Florida 15
# – College Football Playoff champion; ^ – College Football Playoff participant; $ – Conference champion; x – Division champion/co-champions; * LSU and Missouri vacated all wins due to NCAA violations.; Rankings from AP Poll

The 2015 Kentucky Wildcats football team (variously "Kentucky", "UK", or "Wildcats") represented the University of Kentucky in the 2015 NCAA Division I FBS football season. The Wildcats competed in their 122nd season and 82nd as a member of the Southeastern Conference (SEC) as part of its Eastern Division. The team was led by head coach Mark Stoops, in his third year, and played home games at Commonwealth Stadium in Lexington, Kentucky. They finished the season 5–7, 2–6 in SEC play to finish in a tie for fourth place in the Eastern Division.

== Personnel ==
=== Coaching staff ===
Kentucky head coach Mark Stoops entered his third year as the Wildcat's head coach for the 2015 season. On November 30, 2014, Offensive Coordinator Neal Brown accepted the Head Coach position at Troy. In his place, Kentucky hired West Virginia Co-offensive Coordinator Shannon Dawson. Special Teams coach Craig Naivar accepted a position at Houston and was replaced by Andy Buh.

Name	Position	Consecutive season at Kentucky in current position
Mark Stoops	Head coach	3rd
Shannon Dawson	Offensive coordinator, Quarterbacks	1st
D. J. Eliot	Defensive coordinator, Inside Linebackers	3rd
Derrick Ansley	Defensive backs	3rd
Jimmy Brumbaugh	Defensive line	3rd
Andy Buh	Outside linebackers	1st
Tommy Mainord	Wide receivers	3rd
Vince Marrow	Tight Ends, Recruiting Coordinator	3rd
John Schlarman	Offensive line	3rd
Chad Scott	Running backs	3rd

=== Transfers ===
Quarterback Maxwell Smith transferred to San Diego State for his senior season. Running back Braylon Heard forgat his last season of eligibility and entered the 2015 NFL draft. Running back Josh Clemons transferred from the program in May after receiving his degree.

== Schedule ==
Kentucky's 2015 schedule comprised 8 home games and 4 away games. The Wildcats hosted SEC opponents Florida, Missouri, Auburn, and Tennessee, and traveled to South Carolina, Mississippi State, Georgia, and Vanderbilt.

Date	Time	Opponent	Site	TV	Result
September 5	7:00 p.m.	Louisiana–Lafayette*	Commonwealth Stadium; Lexington, Kentucky	ESPNU	W 40–33
September 12	7:30 p.m.	at South Carolina	Williams-Brice Stadium; Columbia, South Carolina	SEC Network	W 26–22
September 19	7:30 p.m.	Florida	Commonwealth Stadium; Lexington, Kentucky	SEC Network	L 9–14
September 26	7:30 p.m.	No. 25 Missouri	Commonwealth Stadium; Lexington, Kentucky	SEC Network	W 21–13
October 3	7:30 p.m.	Eastern Kentucky*	Commonwealth Stadium; Lexington, Kentucky	SEC Net Alt.	W 34–27 ^{OT}
October 15	7:00 p.m.	Auburn	Commonwealth Stadium; Lexington, Kentucky	ESPN	L 27–30
October 24	7:30 p.m.	at Mississippi State	Davis Wade Stadium; Starkville, Mississippi	SEC Network	L 16–42
October 31	7:30 p.m.	Tennessee	Commonwealth Stadium; Lexington, Kentucky	SEC Network	L 21–52
November 7	12:00 p.m.	at Georgia	Sanford Stadium; Athens, Georgia	SEC Network	L 3–27
November 14	4:00 p.m.	at Vanderbilt	Vanderbilt Stadium; Nashville, Tennessee	SEC Network	L 17–21
November 21	12:00 p.m.	Charlotte*	Commonwealth Stadium; Lexington, Kentucky	SEC Net Alt.	W 58–10
November 28	12:00 p.m.	Louisville*	Commonwealth Stadium; Lexington, Kentucky	SEC Network	L 24–38
*Non-conference game; Rankings from AP Poll released prior to game
