= 2015 Vanderbilt Commodores football team =

American college football season

2015 Vanderbilt Commodores football
- Conference: Southeastern Conference
- Eastern Division
- Record: 4–8 (2–6 SEC)
- Head coach: Derek Mason (2nd season)
- Offensive coordinator: Andy Ludwig (1st season)
- Offensive scheme: Pro-style
- Base defense: 3–4
- Home stadium: Vanderbilt Stadium

2015 Southeastern Conference football standings
	Conf.			Overall
Team	W		L	W		L
Eastern Division
No. 25 Florida x	7	–	1	10	–	4
No. 22 Tennessee	5	–	3	9	–	4
Georgia	5	–	3	10	–	3
Vanderbilt	2	–	6	4	–	8
Kentucky	2	–	6	5	–	7
Missouri*	1	–	7	5	–	7
South Carolina	1	–	7	3	–	9
Western Division
No. 1 Alabama x$#^	7	–	1	14	–	1
No. 10 Ole Miss	6	–	2	10	–	3
Arkansas	5	–	3	8	–	5
No. 16 LSU *	5	–	3	9	–	3
Texas A&M	4	–	4	8	–	5
Mississippi State	4	–	4	9	–	4
Auburn	2	–	6	7	–	6
Championship: Alabama 29, Florida 15
# – College Football Playoff champion; ^ – College Football Playoff participant; $ – Conference champion; x – Division champion/co-champions; * LSU and Missouri vacated all wins due to NCAA violations.; Rankings from AP Poll

The 2015 Vanderbilt Commodores football team represented Vanderbilt University during the 2015 NCAA Division I FBS football season. The Commodores played their home games at Vanderbilt Stadium at Dudley Field in Nashville, Tennessee, which has been Vanderbilt football's home stadium since 1922. Derek Mason coached the Commodores for his second year. They are members of the Eastern Division of the Southeastern Conference (SEC). The Commodores finished with a losing record for the second year in a row with an overall record of 4–8 and 2–6 in SEC play.

== Coaching staff ==
- Derek Mason – Head coach/defensive coordinator
- Andy Ludwig - Offensive coordinator/quarterbacks coach
- Charles Bankins – Special teams coordinator/running backs coach
- Gerry Gdowski - Recruiting coordinator/tight ends coach
- Cortez Hankton – Wide receivers coach
- Keven Lightner – Offensive line coach
- Marc Mattioli - Safeties coach
- Frank Maile – Defensive line coach
- Brett Maxie - Cornerbacks coach
- Kenwick Thompson – Associate head coach/linebackers coach
- Tosin Abari – Director of player development
- Tyler Barnes – Director of player personnel
- Tom Bossung - Head Athletic Trainer
- Matt Britain – Assistant Director of Operations
- Cedric Calhoun – Assistant Strength Coach
- Tyler Clarke – Assistant Strength Coach
- Kevin Colon – Associate Director of Student Athletics
- James Dobson - Head Strength Coach
- Jason Grooms – Director of football operations
- Matt Ruland – Assistant-Recruiting/Operations
- Ben Schumacher – Assistant Strength Coach
- Chris Singleton – Equipment manager
- Vavae Tata – Assistant-Player Development
- Ryan Anderson – Graduate assistant - Defense
- Rod Chance - Quality Control Defense
- A.J. Haase – Graduate assistant -Offense
- Eric Lammers – Assistant Director, Player Personnel
- Chris Marve – Graduate assistant - Defense
- Johnell Thomas – Graduate assistant - Strength
- Gary Veach – Assistant Head Equipment Manager

=== Post season awards ===
- Zach Cunningham—All-SEC First Team

== Schedule ==
Vanderbilt announced their 2015 football schedule on October 14, 2014. The 2015 schedule consist of 6 home and away games in the regular season. The Commodores will host SEC foes Georgia, Kentucky, Missouri, and Texas A&M, and will travel to Florida, Ole Miss, South Carolina, and Tennessee.

Date	Time	Opponent	Site	TV	Result	Attendance
September 3	7:00 p.m.	Western Kentucky*	Vanderbilt Stadium; Nashville, TN	SECN	L 12–14	30,307
September 12	2:30 p.m.	No. 10 Georgia	Vanderbilt Stadium; Nashville, TN (rivalry / SEC Nation)	CBS	L 14–31	37,185
September 19	3:00 p.m.	Austin Peay*	Vanderbilt Stadium; Nashville, TN	SEC Alt.	W 47–7	31,399
September 26	6:00 p.m.	at No. 3 Ole Miss	Vaught–Hemingway Stadium; Oxford, MS (rivalry)	ESPNU	L 16–27	60,654
October 3	6:00 p.m.	at Middle Tennessee*	Johnny "Red" Floyd Stadium; Murfreesboro, TN	CBSSN	W 17–13	25,411
October 17	3:00 p.m.	at South Carolina	Williams-Brice Stadium; Columbia, SC	SECN	L 10–19	75,159
October 24	3:00 p.m.	Missouri^{†}	Vanderbilt Stadium; Nashville, TN	SECN	W 10–3	31,128
October 31	6:00 p.m.	at No. 18 Houston*	TDECU Stadium; Houston, TX	ESPN2	L 0–34	29,565
November 7	11:00 a.m.	at No. 11 Florida	Ben Hill Griffin Stadium; Gainesville, FL	ESPN	L 7–9	90,061
November 14	4:00 p.m.	Kentucky	Vanderbilt Stadium; Nashville, TN (rivalry)	SECN	W 21–17	30,301
November 21	6:30 p.m.	Texas A&M	Vanderbilt Stadium; Nashville, TN	SECN	L 0–25	32,482
November 28	4:00 p.m.	at Tennessee	Neyland Stadium; Knoxville, TN (rivalry)	SECN	L 28–53	100,098
*Non-conference game; ^{†}Homecoming; Rankings from AP Poll released prior to the game; All times are in Central time

Schedule source:

== Game summaries ==
=== WKU ===
	1	2	3	4	Total
Western Kentucky	0	0	7	7	14
Vanderbilt	3	0	0	9	12

=== Georgia ===
	1	2	3	4	Total
#10 Georgia	7	7	10	7	31
Vanderbilt	0	6	0	8	14

=== Austin Peay ===
	1	2	3	4	Total
Austin Peay	0	7	0	0	7
Vanderbilt	3	16	21	7	47

=== Ole Miss ===
	1	2	3	4	Total
Vanderbilt	3	0	10	3	16
#3 Ole Miss	7	7	6	7	27

=== Middle Tennessee ===
	1	2	3	4	Total
Vanderbilt	3	0	0	14	17
MTSU	3	3	0	7	13

=== South Carolina ===
	1	2	3	4	Total
Vanderbilt	0	7	3	0	10
South Carolina	6	0	10	3	19

=== Missouri ===
	1	2	3	4	Total
Missouri	0	3	0	0	3
Vanderbilt	0	7	0	3	10

=== Houston ===
	1	2	3	4	Total
Vanderbilt	0	0	0	0	0
#18 Houston	7	13	14	0	34

=== Florida ===
	1	2	3	4	Total
Vanderbilt	0	7	0	0	7
Florida	6	0	0	3	9

=== Kentucky ===
	1	2	3	4	Total
Kentucky	3	7	7	0	17
Vanderbilt	7	14	0	0	21

=== Texas A&M ===
	1	2	3	4	Total
Texas A&M	6	10	6	3	25
Vanderbilt	0	0	0	0	0

=== Tennessee ===
	1	2	3	4	Total
Vanderbilt	7	7	0	14	28
Tennessee	17	10	16	10	53
