= 2015 Missouri Tigers football team =

American college football season

2015 Missouri Tigers football
- Conference: Southeastern Conference
- Eastern Division
- Record: 0–7, 5 wins vacated (0–7 SEC, 1 win vacated)
- Head coach: Gary Pinkel (15th season)
- Offensive coordinator: Josh Henson (3rd season)
- Offensive scheme: Spread
- Defensive coordinator: Barry Odom (1st season)
- Base defense: 4–3
- Home stadium: Faurot Field

2015 Southeastern Conference football standings
	Conf.			Overall
Team	W		L	W		L
Eastern Division
No. 25 Florida x	7	–	1	10	–	4
No. 22 Tennessee	5	–	3	9	–	4
Georgia	5	–	3	10	–	3
Vanderbilt	2	–	6	4	–	8
Kentucky	2	–	6	5	–	7
Missouri*	1	–	7	5	–	7
South Carolina	1	–	7	3	–	9
Western Division
No. 1 Alabama x$#^	7	–	1	14	–	1
No. 10 Ole Miss	6	–	2	10	–	3
Arkansas	5	–	3	8	–	5
No. 16 LSU *	5	–	3	9	–	3
Texas A&M	4	–	4	8	–	5
Mississippi State	4	–	4	9	–	4
Auburn	2	–	6	7	–	6
Championship: Alabama 29, Florida 15
# – College Football Playoff champion; ^ – College Football Playoff participant; $ – Conference champion; x – Division champion/co-champions; * LSU and Missouri vacated all wins due to NCAA violations.; Rankings from AP Poll

The 2015 Missouri Tigers football team (also called "Mizzou") represented the University of Missouri in the 2015 NCAA Division I FBS football season. It marked the Tigers' fourth season as a member of the Southeastern Conference (SEC) in the Eastern Division. The team played its home games at Faurot Field in Columbia, Missouri. They were led by 15th year head coach Gary Pinkel, in what would be his last season as the team's head coach.

Due to National Collegiate Athletic Association (NCAA) action, all of Missouri's wins for the 2015 and 2016 seasons were vacated.

== Recruits ==
College recruiting information (2015)
Name	Hometown	School	Height	Weight	40^{‡}	Commit date
Chase Abbington; RB	St. Peters, MO	Hutchinson C.C.	6 ft 2 in (1.88 m)	209 lb (95 kg)		Nov 5, 2013
Chase Abbington; RB	Recruit ratings: Scout: Rivals: 247Sports: ESPN:					
Franklin Agbasimere; LB	Montverde, FL	Montverde Academy	6 ft 2 in (1.88 m)	220 lb (100 kg)		Jan 18, 2015
Franklin Agbasimere; LB	Recruit ratings: Scout: Rivals: 247Sports: ESPN:					
Terry Beckner; DT	East St. Louis, IL	East St. Louis	6 ft 4 in (1.93 m)	298 lb (135 kg)		Feb 4, 2015
Terry Beckner; DT	Recruit ratings: Scout: Rivals: 247Sports: ESPN:					
Malik Cuellar; OT	San Francisco, CA	City College of San Francisco	6 ft 5 in (1.96 m)	290 lb (130 kg)		Dec 17, 2014
Malik Cuellar; OT	Recruit ratings: Scout: Rivals: 247Sports: ESPN:					
Marquise Doherty; ATH	Kansas City, MO	Winnetonka	6 ft 1 in (1.85 m)	190 lb (86 kg)		Dec 26, 2014
Marquise Doherty; ATH	Recruit ratings: Scout: Rivals: 247Sports: ESPN:					
Corey Fatony; K	Franklin, TN	Franklin	5 ft 11 in (1.80 m)	185 lb (84 kg)		Jun 18, 2014
Corey Fatony; K	Recruit ratings: Scout: Rivals: 247Sports: ESPN:					
Richaud Floyd; WR	Gulfport, MS	Gulfport	5 ft 11 in (1.80 m)	165 lb (75 kg)		Jul 29, 2014
Richaud Floyd; WR	Recruit ratings: Scout: Rivals: 247Sports: ESPN:					
Marcell Frazier; SDE	Portland, OR	College of the Siskiyous	6 ft 4 in (1.93 m)	250 lb (110 kg)		Dec 18, 2014
Marcell Frazier; SDE	Recruit ratings: Scout: Rivals: 247Sports: ESPN:					
Emanuel Hall; WR	Franklin, TN	Centennial	6 ft 3 in (1.91 m)	175 lb (79 kg)		Jul 31, 2014
Emanuel Hall; WR	Recruit ratings: Scout: Rivals: 247Sports: ESPN:					
Terez Hall; LB	Lithonia, GA	Martin Luther King	6 ft 3 in (1.91 m)	208 lb (94 kg)		Feb 4, 2015
Terez Hall; LB	Recruit ratings: Scout: Rivals: 247Sports:					
AJ Harris; OL	Stilwell, KS	Blue Valley	6 ft 3 in (1.91 m)	297 lb (135 kg)	4.9	Apr 1, 2014
AJ Harris; OL	Recruit ratings: Scout: Rivals: 247Sports: ESPN:					
Cam Hilton; S	St. Louis, MO	Webster Groves	6 ft 0 in (1.83 m)	172 lb (78 kg)		Apr 19, 2014
Cam Hilton; S	Recruit ratings: Scout: Rivals: 247Sports: ESPN:					
Nate Howard; DE	St. Louis, MO	Ladue Horton Watkins	6 ft 5 in (1.96 m)	220 lb (100 kg)		Jan 30, 2015
Nate Howard; DE	Recruit ratings: Scout: Rivals: 247Sports: ESPN:					
Tyler Howell; OL	El Dorado, KS	Butler County C.C.	6 ft 9 in (2.06 m)	305 lb (138 kg)		Jan 22, 2015
Tyler Howell; OL	Recruit ratings: Scout: Rivals: 247Sports: ESPN:					
Tyrell Jacobs; DT	Metairie, LA	Rummel	6 ft 4 in (1.93 m)	260 lb (120 kg)	4.9	Jan 24, 2015
Tyrell Jacobs; DT	Recruit ratings: Scout: Rivals: 247Sports: ESPN:					
Johnathon Johnson; WR	Memphis, TN	Melrose	5 ft 9 in (1.75 m)	165 lb (75 kg)		Jan 18, 2015
Johnathon Johnson; WR	Recruit ratings: Scout: Rivals: 247Sports: ESPN:					
Drew Lock; QB	Lee’s Summit, MO	Lee’s Summit	6 ft 3 in (1.91 m)	205 lb (93 kg)		Apr 9, 2014
Drew Lock; QB	Recruit ratings: Scout: Rivals: 247Sports: ESPN:					
Josh Moore; DE	Olathe, KS	North	6 ft 5 in (1.96 m)	250 lb (110 kg)		Jan 31, 2015
Josh Moore; DE	Recruit ratings: Scout: Rivals: 247Sports: ESPN:					
Tanner Owen; OL	Kearney, MO	Kearney	6 ft 6 in (1.98 m)	265 lb (120 kg)	5.1	Jun 11, 2014
Tanner Owen; OL	Recruit ratings: Scout: Rivals: 247Sports: ESPN:					
Ronnell Perkins; ATH	University City, MO	University City	6 ft 1 in (1.85 m)	175 lb (79 kg)		Aug 7, 2014
Ronnell Perkins; ATH	Recruit ratings: Scout: Rivals: 247Sports: ESPN:					
Justin Smith; WR	Dublin, GA	West Laurens	6 ft 7 in (2.01 m)	200 lb (91 kg)	4.6	Jan 18, 2015
Justin Smith; WR	Recruit ratings: Scout: Rivals: 247Sports: ESPN:					
T.J. Warren; DB	Conyers, GA	Rockdale County	6 ft 0 in (1.83 m)	190 lb (86 kg)	4.4	Oct 7, 2014
T.J. Warren; DB	Recruit ratings: Scout: Rivals: 247Sports: ESPN:					
Ryan Williams; RB	Lee’s Summit, MO	Lee’s Summit West	5 ft 10 in (1.78 m)	178 lb (81 kg)		Feb 15, 2014
Ryan Williams; RB	Recruit ratings: Scout: Rivals: 247Sports: ESPN:					
Overall recruit ranking: Scout: 2.97 (#32) Rivals: 2.79 (#35) ESPN: 76.6
‡ Refers to 40-yard dash; Note: In many cases, Scout, Rivals, 247Sports, On3, and ESPN may conflict in their listings of height, weight and 40 time.; In these cases, the average was taken. ESPN grades are on a 100-point scale.; Sources: "Missouri 2015 Football Commitments". Rivals.; "2015 Missouri Commits". Scout.; "2015 Player Commitments – Missouri". ESPN.; "Scout.com Team Recruiting Rankings". Scout.; "2015 Team Ranking". Rivals.com.

== Schedule ==
Missouri announced their 2015 football schedule on October 14, 2014. The 2015 schedule consisted of 6 home games, 5 away games and 1 neutral game in the regular season. The Tigers hosted SEC foes Florida, Mississippi State, South Carolina, and Tennessee, and travelled to Arkansas, Georgia, Kentucky, and Vanderbilt.

Missouri hosted Mississippi State for the first time since 1984, when the Tigers were playing in the Big Eight Conference, before joining the SEC 28 years later. That match–up against the Bulldogs was the third Thursday night game hosted by Missouri in Tiger history. It was the Tigers' first year without Texas A&M on their schedule since 2009, and the first year without any team from Texas on its schedule since 1984.

At the release of the 2015 schedule, Missouri was the only member in the SEC to not complete their entire schedule as the Tigers were still finalizing the game to be played on November 14. One month later after releasing of their schedule, Missouri announced that the game on November 14 would be played against BYU at Arrowhead Stadium in Kansas City.

Date	Time	Opponent	Rank	Site	TV	Result	Attendance
September 5	3:00 p.m.	Southeast Missouri*	No. 24	Faurot Field; Columbia, MO	SEC Alt.	W 34–3 (vacated)	64,670
September 12	6:00 p.m.	at Arkansas State*	No. 21	Centennial Bank Stadium; Jonesboro, AR	ESPN3	W 27–20 (vacated)	29,143
September 19	11:00 a.m.	UConn*	No. 22	Faurot Field; Columbia, MO	ESPN	W 9–6 (vacated)	70,079
September 26	6:30 p.m.	at Kentucky	No. 25	Commonwealth Stadium; Lexington, KY	SECN	L 13–21	58,008
October 3	11:00 a.m.	South Carolina		Faurot Field; Columbia, MO	SECN	W 24–10 (vacated)	66,751
October 10	6:30 p.m.	No. 11 Florida^{†}		Faurot Field; Columbia, MO	SECN	L 3–21	70,767
October 17	6:30 p.m.	at Georgia		Sanford Stadium; Athens, GA	SECN	L 6–9	92,746
October 24	3:00 p.m.	at Vanderbilt		Vanderbilt Stadium; Nashville, TN	SECN	L 3–10	31,128
November 5	8:00 p.m.	No. 24 Mississippi State		Faurot Field; Columbia, MO (SEC Nation)	ESPN	L 13–31	58,878
November 14	6:30 p.m.	vs. BYU*		Arrowhead Stadium; Kansas City, MO	SECN	W 20–16 (vacated)	42,824
November 21	6:15 p.m.	Tennessee		Faurot Field; Columbia, MO	ESPN2	L 8–19	59,575
November 27	1:30 p.m.	at Arkansas		Donald W. Reynolds Razorback Stadium; Fayetteville, AR (Battle Line Rivalry)	CBS	L 3–28	65,228
*Non-conference game; ^{†}Homecoming; Rankings from AP Poll released prior to game; All times are in Central time

Schedule source:

== Rankings ==
Ranking movements Legend: ██ Increase in ranking ██ Decrease in ranking — = Not ranked RV = Received votes
	Week															
Poll	Pre	1	2	3	4	5	6	7	8	9	10	11	12	13	14	Final
AP	24	21	22	25	—	RV	—	—	—	—	—	—	—	—	—	—
Coaches	23	21	20	23	RV	RV	—	—	—	—	—	—	—	—	—	—
CFP	Not released									—	—	—	—	—	—	Not released

== NFL draft ==
Round	Pick	Player	Position	NFL Club
4	128	Evan Boehm	C	Arizona Cardinals
5	144	Conner McGovern	C	Denver Broncos
5	150	Kentrell Brothers	LB	Minnesota Vikings

== Campus protests and resignation of Tim Wolfe ==
In the fall of 2015 there were a number of racially charged incidents at the University of Missouri campus. Some students held protests, and some called for the resignation of university system president Tim Wolfe, who they said had not provided a sufficient response to the incidents. On November 7 some members of the Missouri Tigers football team said that they would boycott all football-related activities until Wolfe resigned. Coach Pinkel stated that he supported the players. On November 9 Wolfe resigned as president.
