= 2015 Arkansas Razorbacks football team =

American college football season

2015 Arkansas Razorbacks football

Liberty Bowl champion

Liberty Bowl, W 45–23 vs. Kansas State
- Conference: Southeastern Conference
- Western Division
- Record: 8–5 (5–3 SEC)
- Head coach: Bret Bielema (3rd season)
- Offensive coordinator: Dan Enos (1st season)
- Offensive scheme: Pro-style
- Defensive coordinator: Robb Smith (2nd season)
- Base defense: 4–3
- Captains: Brandon Allen; Jonathan Williams; Brooks Ellis; JaMichael Winston
- Home stadium: Donald W. Reynolds Razorback Stadium; War Memorial Stadium

2015 Southeastern Conference football standings
	Conf.			Overall
Team	W		L	W		L
Eastern Division
No. 25 Florida x	7	–	1	10	–	4
No. 22 Tennessee	5	–	3	9	–	4
Georgia	5	–	3	10	–	3
Vanderbilt	2	–	6	4	–	8
Kentucky	2	–	6	5	–	7
Missouri*	1	–	7	5	–	7
South Carolina	1	–	7	3	–	9
Western Division
No. 1 Alabama x$#^	7	–	1	14	–	1
No. 10 Ole Miss	6	–	2	10	–	3
Arkansas	5	–	3	8	–	5
No. 16 LSU *	5	–	3	9	–	3
Texas A&M	4	–	4	8	–	5
Mississippi State	4	–	4	9	–	4
Auburn	2	–	6	7	–	6
Championship: Alabama 29, Florida 15
# – College Football Playoff champion; ^ – College Football Playoff participant; $ – Conference champion; x – Division champion/co-champions; * LSU and Missouri vacated all wins due to NCAA violations.; Rankings from AP Poll

The 2015 Arkansas Razorbacks football team represented the University of Arkansas as a member of the Southeastern Conference (SEC) during the 2015 NCAA Division I FBS football season. Led by third-year head coach Bret Bielema, the Razorbacks compiled an overall record of 8–5 with a mark of 5–3 in conference play, tying for third place in the SEC's Western Division. Arkansas was invited to the Liberty Bowl, where the Razorbacks defeated Kansas State. The team played five home games at Donald W. Reynolds Razorback Stadium in Fayetteville, Arkansas and two home games at War Memorial Stadium in Little Rock, Arkansas.

Dan Enos served his first season as offensive coordinator, replacing Jim Chaney who left for a job with Pittsburgh. Enos was previously the head coach of Central Michigan.

== Schedule ==
Date	Time	Opponent	Rank	Site	TV	Result	Attendance
September 5	2:30 p.m.	UTEP*	No. 18	Donald W. Reynolds Razorback Stadium; Fayetteville, AR (SEC Nation)	ESPNU	W 48–13	67,708
September 12	3:00 p.m.	Toledo*	No. 18	War Memorial Stadium; Little Rock, AR	SECN	L 12–16	49,591
September 19	6:00 p.m.	Texas Tech*		Donald W. Reynolds Razorback Stadium; Fayetteville, AR (rivalry)	ESPN2	L 24–35	73,334
September 26	6:00 p.m.	vs. No. 14 Texas A&M		AT&T Stadium; Arlington, TX (rivalry)	ESPN	L 21–28 ^{OT}	67,339
October 3	6:00 p.m.	at Tennessee		Neyland Stadium; Knoxville, TN	ESPN2	W 24–20	101,265
October 10	6:00 p.m.	at No. 8 Alabama		Bryant–Denny Stadium; Tuscaloosa, AL	ESPN	L 14–27	101,821
October 24	11:00 a.m.	Auburn		Donald W. Reynolds Razorback Stadium; Fayetteville, AR	SECN	W 54–46 ^{4OT}	72,008
October 31	3:00 p.m.	Tennessee–Martin*^{†}		Donald W. Reynolds Razorback Stadium; Fayetteville, AR	SECN	W 63–28	64,206
November 7	2:30 p.m.	at No. 18 Ole Miss		Vaught–Hemingway Stadium; Oxford, MS (rivalry, SEC Nation)	CBS	W 53–52 ^{OT}	60,680
November 14	6:15 p.m.	at No. 9 LSU		Tiger Stadium; Baton Rouge, LA (rivalry)	ESPN	W 31–14	101,699
November 21	6:00 p.m.	Mississippi State		Donald W. Reynolds Razorback Stadium; Fayetteville, AR	ESPN	L 50–51	71,936
November 27	1:30 p.m.	Missouri		Donald W. Reynolds Razorback Stadium; Fayetteville, AR (Battle Line Rivalry)	CBS	W 28–3	65,228
January 2	2:20 p.m.	vs. Kansas State*		Liberty Bowl Memorial Stadium; Memphis, TN (Liberty Bowl)	ESPN	W 45–23	61,136
*Non-conference game; ^{†}Homecoming; Rankings from AP Poll released prior to the game; All times are in Central time

== Rankings ==
Ranking movements Legend: ██ Increase in ranking ██ Decrease in ranking — = Not ranked RV = Received votes
	Week															
Poll	Pre	1	2	3	4	5	6	7	8	9	10	11	12	13	14	Final
AP	18	18	RV	—	—	—	—	—	—	—	—	RV	RV	RV	RV	RV
Coaches	20	18	RV	—	—	—	—	—	—	—	RV	RV	RV	—	—	RV
CFP	Not released									—	—	—	—	—	—	Not released

== Season summary ==
Arkansas lost leading returning rusher Jonathan Williams before the season to a foot injury, tempering expectations slightly, but the #18 ranked Razorbacks cruised to a 48–13 victory over UTEP in the season opener.

The next three weeks, however, were full of disappointment. First, the Razorbacks lost to Toledo, a 23-point underdog, in Little Rock's War Memorial Stadium, 16–12, and then turned around and lost to Texas Tech in Fayetteville, 35–24. A week later, Texas A&M defeated the Razorbacks in overtime for the second consecutive year, 28–21, to begin SEC play.

Bielema got his first SEC road win to begin October, defeating the Tennessee Volunteers 24–20 in Neyland Stadium. After dropping one on the road to eventual SEC champion Alabama on October 10, the Razorbacks would not lose again until November 21.

That included a four-overtime win at home over Auburn, a wild overtime victory over then #19 Ole Miss on the road which saw the Razorbacks convert a 4th-and-25 in overtime via a lateral from tight end Hunter Henry, and a 31–14 dismantling of then #9 LSU.

Despite losing a shootout to Mississippi State in Fayetteville, Arkansas bounced back with a 28–3 victory in the regular season finale over Missouri in Gary Pinkel's final game coaching the Tigers.

Arkansas accepted an invitation to the Liberty Bowl to play Kansas State on Jan. 2. Thanks to three touchdowns and 185 yards from running back Alex Collins, the Razorbacks defeated the Wildcats, 45–23. It was the first time Arkansas had won back-to-back bowl games in consecutive seasons in program history, and the 45 points was the most ever in a bowl game. The Razorbacks have won each of their last three bowl games, counting back to the 2012 Cotton Bowl.

The seven regular season wins, including five in SEC play, were the most for Arkansas since Bobby Petrino's final season in 2011. That season also ended with a bowl game victory against Kansas State.

Tight end Hunter Henry and offensive guard Sebastian Tretola were named first team All-SEC. Henry was also a consensus first team All-American, and won the John Mackey Award given to the nation's best tight end. Tretola was named an All-American as well. Quarterback Brandon Allen, Collins, and offensive tackle Dan Skipper were named second team All-SEC. Freshman linebacker Dre Greenlaw was named to the SEC All-Freshman Team, as well as the Freshman All-American Team.

Collins was named the Liberty Bowl MVP. Collins would finish the season with 1,577 yards rushing, good enough for third place in the Arkansas all-time single season record book. Collins' 20 rushing touchdowns in 2015 ranks first for the Hogs program. Collins elected to leave early for the NFL draft, finishing his college career with 3,703 yards, which is second in school history behind only Darren McFadden, and 36 rushing touchdowns. He also became only the third player in school history to rush for 1,000 yards in three consecutive seasons, joining McFadden (2005–2007) and Ben Cowins (1976–1978), as well as joining McFadden and Herschel Walker as the only running backs in SEC history to have 1,000 yard seasons in their first three years playing college football.

== Game summaries ==
=== UTEP ===
UTEP Miners at #18 Arkansas Razorbacks

Quarter	1	2	3	4	Total
Miners	0	10	3	0	13
#18 Razorbacks	14	14	17	3	48

at Donald W. Reynolds Razorback Stadium • Fayetteville, AR

- Date: September 5, 2015
- Game time: 2:30 p.m. CT
- Game attendance: 67,708
- TV: ESPNU
- Source

Game information

First Quarter

- (11:35) ARK TD: Brandon Allen 26-yard pass to Drew Morgan (Cole Hedlund PAT).
- (4:11) ARK TD: Brandon Allen 20-yard pass to Keon Hatcher (Cole Hedlund PAT).

Second Quarter

- (12:51) UTEP FG: Jay Mattox 38-yard field goal.
- (11:17) ARK TD: Brandon Allen 58-yard pass to Jared Cornelius (Cole Hedlund PAT).
- (8:56) UTEP TD: Autrey Golden 10-yard rush (Jay Mattox PAT).
- (5:17) ARK TD: Brandon Allen 38-yard pass to Keon Hatcher (Cole Hedlund PAT).

Third Quarter

- (14:42) ARK TD: Alex Collins 7-yard rush (Cole Hedlund PAT).
- (12:57) ARK TD: Kody Walker 3-yard rush (Cole Hedlund PAT).
- (8:38) ARK FG: Cole Hedlund 19-yard field goal.
- (3:01) UTEP FG: Jay Mattox 44-yard field goal.

Fourth Quarter

- (6:30) ARK FG: Cole Hedlund 27-yard field goal.

Top Passers

- UTEP – Mack Leftwich: 9/14, 120 yds, 1 INT
- ARK – Brandon Allen: 14/18: 308 yds, 4 TD

Top Rushers

- UTEP – Aaron Jones: 15 att, 70 yds
- ARK – Alex Collins: 12 att, 127 yds, 1 TD

Top Receiving

- UTEP – Aaron Jones: 6 rec, 83 yds
- ARK – Keon Hatcher: 6 rec, 106 yds, 2 TD

=== Toledo ===
Toledo Rockets at #18 Arkansas Razorbacks

Quarter	1	2	3	4	Total
Rockets	6	3	7	0	16
#18 Razorbacks	0	7	0	5	12

at War Memorial Stadium • Little Rock, AR

- Date: September 12, 2015
- Game time: 3:00 p.m. CT
- Game attendance: 49,591
- TV: SEC Network
- Source

Game information

First Quarter

- (6:59) TOL TD: Phillip Ely 5-yard pass to Corey Jones (2-pt. no good).

Second Quarter

- (7:53) ARK TD: Alex Collins 21-yard rush (Cole Hedlund PAT).
- (1:06) TOL FG: Jameson Vest 38-yard field goal.

Third Quarter

- (5:09) TOL TD: Damion Jones-Moore 11-yard rush (Jameson Vest PAT).

Fourth Quarter

- (9:30) ARK FG: Cole Hedlund 25-yard field goal.
- (0:52) ARK SAFETY: TOLEDO rush for −14 yds.

Top Passers

- TOL – Phillip Ely: 21/38, 237 yds, 1 TD
- ARK – Brandon Allen: 32/53, 412 yds, 1 INT

Top Rushers

- TOL – Damion Jones-Moore: 11 att, 68 yds, 1 TD
- ARK – Alex Collins: 20 att, 54 yds, 1 TD

Top Receiving

- TOL – Corey Jones: 8 rec, 61 yds, 1 TD
- ARK – Hunter Henry: 8 rec, 117 yds

=== Texas Tech ===
Texas Tech Red Raiders at Arkansas Razorbacks

Quarter	1	2	3	4	Total
Red Raiders	14	7	7	7	35
Razorbacks	7	14	3	0	24

at Donald W. Reynolds Razorback Stadium • Fayetteville, AR

- Date: September 19, 2015
- Game time: 6:00 p.m. CT
- Game attendance: 73,334
- TV: ESPN2
- Source

Game information

First Quarter

- (10:45) TTU TD: Patrick Mahomes II 3-yard pass to Reginald Davis III (Michael Barden PAT).
- (3:06) ARK TD: Alex Collins 1-yard rush (Cole Hedlund PAT).
- (0:21) TTU TD: Patick Mahomes II 1-yard rush (Michael Barden PAT).

Second Quarter

- (8:18) ARK TD: Brandon Allen 7-yard pass to Hunter Henry (Cole Hedlund PAT).
- (7:52) TTU TD: Jakeem Grant 72-yard pass to Reginald Davis III (Michael Barden PAT).
- (1:03) ARK TD: Brandon Allen 24-yard pass to Drew Morgan (Cole Hedlund PAT).

Third Quarter

- (10:31) TTU TD: Patrick Mahomes II 2-yard rush (Michael Barden PAT).
- (2:00) ARK FG: Cole Hedlund 22-yard field goal.

Fourth Quarter

- (13:09) TTU TD: Justin Stockton 22-yard rush (Michael Barden PAT).

Top Passers

- TTU – Patrick Mahomes II: 26/30, 243 yds, 1 TD, 2 INT
- ARK – Brandon Allen: 16/21: 196 yds, 2 TD, 1 INT

Top Rushers

- TTU – DeAndre Washington: 11 att, 75 yds
- ARK – Alex Collins: 28 att, 170 yds, 1 TD

Top Receiving

- TTU – Reginald Davis III: 5 rec, 115 yds, 2 TD
- ARK – Drew Morgan: 4 rec, 45 yds, 1 TD

=== Vs. No. 14 Texas A&M ===
#14 Texas A&M Aggies vs Arkansas Razorbacks

Quarter	1	2	3	4	OT	Total
#14 Aggies	0	10	3	8	7	28
Razorbacks	7	0	7	7	0	21

at AT&T Stadium • Arlington, TX

- Date: September 26, 2015
- Game time: 6:00 p.m. CT
- Game attendance: 67,339
- TV: ESPN
- Source

Game information

First Quarter

- (1:08) ARK TD: Brandon Allen 17-yard pass to Drew Morgan (Cole Hedlund PAT).

Second Quarter

- (14:48) A&M TD: Kyle Allen 44-yard pass to Christian Kirk (Taylor Bertolet PAT).
- (5:33) A&M FG: Taylor Bertolet 23-yard field goal.

Third Quarter

- (8:04) A&M FG: Taylor Bertolet 22-yard field goal.
- (4:17) ARK TD: Alex Collins 4-yard rush (Cole Hedlund PAT).

Fourth Quarter

- (14:12) ARK TD: Rawleigh Williams III 3-yard rush (Cole Hedlund PAT).
- (2:50) A&M TD: Tra Carson 2-yard rush (2-pt. good).

Overtime

- (OT) A&M TD: Kyle Allen 20-yard pass to Christian Kirk (Taylor Bertolet PAT).

Top Passers

- A&M – Kyle Allen: 21/28, 358 yds, 2 TD
- ARK – Brandon Allen: 20/25: 225 yds, 1 TD, 1 INT

Top Rushers

- A&M – Tra Carson: 8 att, 28 yds, 1 TD
- ARK – Alex Collins: 26 att, 151 yds, 1 TD

Top Receiving

- A&M – Christian Kirk: 8 rec, 173 yds, 2 TD
- ARK – Drew Morgan: 8 rec, 155 yds, 1 TD

=== At Tennessee ===
Arkansas Razorbacks at Tennessee Volunteers

Quarter	1	2	3	4	Total
Razorbacks	7	10	7	0	24
Volunteers	14	3	3	0	20

at Neyland Stadium • Knoxville, TN

- Date: October 3, 2015
- Game time: 6:00 p.m. CT
- Game attendance: 101,265
- TV: ESPN2
- Source

Game information

First Quarter

- (14:46) TENN TD: Evan Berry 96-yard kickoff return (Aaron Medley PAT).
- (8:06) TENN TD: Joshua Dobbs 7-yard rush (Aaron Medley PAT).
- (5:57) ARK TD: Alex Collins 4-yard rush (Cole Hedlund PAT).

Second Quarter

- (14:03) ARK TD: Brandon Allen 33-yard pass to Dominique Reed (Cole Hedlund PAT).
- (9:54) TENN FG: Aaron Medley 35-yard field goal.
- (0:00) ARK FG: Cole Hedlund 26-yard field goal.

Third Quarter

- (9:12) ARK TD: Alex Collins 1-yard rush (Cole Hedlund PAT).
- (6:41) TENN FG: Aaron Medley 45-yard field goal.

Fourth Quarter

No scoring

Top Passers

- ARK – Brandon Allen: 11/24, 219 yds, 1 TD
- TENN – Joshua Dobbs: 20/36, 232 yds

Top Rushers

- ARK – Alex Collins: 27 att, 154 yds, 2 TD
- TENN – Jalen Hurd: 19 att, 90 yds

Top Receiving

- ARK – Drew Morgan: 5 rec, 110 yds
- TENN – Jalen Hurd: 3 rec, 51 yds

=== At No. 8 Alabama ===
Arkansas Razorbacks at #8 Alabama Crimson Tide

Quarter	1	2	3	4	Total
Razorbacks	0	7	0	7	14
#8 Crimson Tide	3	0	7	17	27

at Bryant–Denny Stadium • Tuscaloosa, AL

- Date: October 10, 2015
- Game time: 6:00 p.m. CT
- Game attendance: 101,821
- TV: ESPN
- Source

Game information

First Quarter

- (7:09) ALA FG: Adam Griffith 24-yard field goal.

Second Quarter

- (1:29) ARK TD: Brandon Allen 4-yard pass to Drew Morgan (Cole Hedlund PAT).

Third Quarter

- (1:39) ALA TD: Jake Coker 81-yard pass to Calvin Ridley (Adam Griffith PAT).

Fourth Quarter

- (12:49) ALA TD: Jake Coker 3-yard pass to Richard Mullaney (Adam Griffith PAT).
- (10:07) ALA FG: Adam Griffith 35-yard field goal.
- (2:44) ALA TD: Derrick Henry 1-yard rush (Adam Griffith PAT).
- (1:37) ARK TD: Brandon Allen 54-yard pass to Dominique Reed (Cole Hedlund PAT).

Top Passers

- ARK – Brandon Allen: 15/32, 176 yds, 2 TD, 1 INT
- ALA – Jake Coker: 24/33, 262 yds, 2 TD, 2 INT

Top Rushers

- ARK – Alex Collins: 12 att, 26 yds
- ALA – Derrick Henry: 27 att, 95 yds, 1 TD

Top Receiving

- ARK – Dominique Reed: 3 rec, 77 yds, 1 TD
- ALA – Calvin Ridley: 9 rec, 140 yds, 1 TD

=== Auburn ===
Auburn Tigers at Arkansas Razorbacks

Quarter	1	2	3	4	OT	2OT	3OT	4OT	Total
Tigers	0	7	7	10	7	7	8	0	46
Razorbacks	7	7	7	3	7	7	8	8	54

at Donald W. Reynolds Razorback Stadium • Fayetteville, AR

- Date: October 24, 2015
- Game time: 11:00 a.m. CT
- Game attendance: 72,008
- TV: ESPNU
- Source

Game information

First Quarter

- (11:33) ARK TD: Dominique Reed 11-yard rush (Cole Hedlund PAT).

Second Quarter

- (14:22) ARK TD: Brandon Allen 23-yard pass to Jeremy Sprinkle (Cole Hedlund PAT).
- (0:30) AUB TD: Peyton Barber 1-yard rush (Daniel Carson PAT).

Third Quarter

- (9:09) AUB TD: Jason Smith 9-yard rush (Daniel Carson PAT).
- (2:14) ARK TD: Alex Collins 7-yard rush (Cole Hedlund PAT).

Fourth Quarter

- (6:54) AUB TD: Jeremy Johnson 1-yard rush (Daniel Carson PAT).
- (1:07) ARK FG: Cole Hedlund 25-yard field goal.
- (0:04) AUB FG: Daniel Carson 41-yard field goal.

Overtime

- (OT) AUB TD: Peyton Barber 2-yard rush (Daniel Carson PAT).
- (OT) ARK TD: Brandon Allen 6-yard pass to Drew Morgan (Cole Hedlund PAT).

2nd Overtime

- (2OT) ARK TD: Kody Walker 3-yard rush (Cole Hedlund PAT).
- (2OT) AUB TD: Peyton Barber 2-yard rush (Daniel Carson PAT).

3rd Overtime

- (3OT) AUB TD: Peyton Barber 1-yard rush (2-pt. good).
- (3OT) ARK TD: Kody Walker 4-yard rush (2-pt. good).

4th Overtime

- (4OT) ARK TD: Brandon Allen 25-yard pass to Drew Morgan (2-pt. good).

Top Passers

- AUB – Sean White: 19/32, 254 yds
- ARK – Brandon Allen: 19/31, 233 yds, 3 TD, 1 INT

Top Rushers

- AUB – Peyton Barber: 37 att, 120 yds, 4 TD
- ARK – Alex Collins: 25 att, 105 yds, 1 TD

Top Receiving

- AUB – Ricardo Louis: 6 rec, 79 yds
- ARK – Hunter Henry: 5 rec, 68 yds

=== UT Martin ===
UT Martin Skyhawks at Arkansas Razorbacks

Quarter	1	2	3	4	Total
Skyhawks	0	14	7	7	28
Razorbacks	7	28	21	7	63

at War Memorial Stadium • Little Rock, AR

- Date: October 31
- Game time: 3:00 p.m. CT
- Game attendance: 64,206
- TV: SEC Network
- Source

Game information

First Quarter

- (10:20) ARK TD: Alex Collins 2-yard rush (Cole Hedlund PAT).

Second Quarter

- (14:18) ARK TD: Alex Collins 6-yard rush (Cole Hedlund PAT).
- (10:05) ARK TD: Alex Collins 5-yard rush (Cole Hedlund PAT).
- (7:23) UTM TD: Jaimiee Bowe 26-yard rush (Jackson Redditt PAT).
- (6:15) ARK TD: Brandon Allen 49-yard pass to Damon Mitchell (Cole Hedlund PAT).
- (3:48) ARK TD: Alex Collins 3-yard rush (Cole Hedlund PAT).
- (1:28) UTM TD: Najee Ray 21-yard rush (Jackson Redditt PAT).

Third Quarter

- (12:11) UTM TD: Trent Garland 1-yard rush (Jackson Redditt PAT).
- (11:10) ARK TD: Brandon Allen 71-yard pass to Dominique Reed (Cole Hedlund PAT).
- (6:01) ARK TD: Brandon Allen 3-yard rush (Cole Hedlund PAT).
- (0:18) ARK TD: Alex Collins 63-yard rush (Cole Hedlund PAT).

Fourth Quarter

- (14:08) ARK TD: Austin Allen 35-yard pass to Hunter Henry (Cole Hedlund PAT).
- (2:42) UTM TD: Jarod Neal 12-yard pass to Ben Axline (Jackson Redditt PAT).

Top Passers

- UTM – Jarod Neal: 30/43, 380 yds, 1 TD, 1 INT
- ARK – Brandon Allen: 14/19, 265 yds, 2 TD

Top Rushers

- UTM – Trent Garland: 11 att, 55 yds, 1 TD
- ARK – Alex Collins: 16 att, 173 yds, 5 TD

Top Receiving

- UTM – Caylon Weathers: 6 rec, 111 yds
- ARK – Dominique Reed: 1 rec, 71 yds, 1 TD

=== At No. 18 Ole Miss ===
Arkansas Razorbacks at #19 Ole Miss Rebels

Quarter	1	2	3	4	OT	Total
Razorbacks	7	10	14	14	8	53
#18 Rebels	7	10	14	14	7	52

at Vaught–Hemingway Stadium • Oxford, MS

- Date: November 7, 2015
- Game time: 2:30 p.m. CT
- Game weather: Light Rain • Temperature: 55 °F (13 °C)
- Game attendance: 60,680
- Referee: Tom Ritter
- TV announcers (CBS): Carter Blackburn (play-by-play), Aaron Taylor (color), Jenny Dell (sideline)
- Source

Game information

First Quarter

- (4:46) Arkansas – Drew Morgan 31 yard pass from Brandon Allen (Cole Hedlund kick) Arkansas 7–0; 6 plays, 73 yards, 3:12
- (1:32) Ole Miss – Jaylen Walton 3 yard run (Gary Wunderlich kick) Tied 7–7; 9 plays, 77 yards, 3:14

Second Quarter

- (7:28) Arkansas – Dominique Reed 15 yard pass from Brandon Allen (Cole Hedlund kick) Arkansas 14–7; 10 plays, 59 yards, 5:23
- (5:05) Ole Miss – Chad Kelly 11 yard run (Gary Wunderlich kick) Tied 14–14; 9 plays, 78 yards, 2:23
- (0:43) Arkansas – Cole Hedlund 45 yard field goal Arkansas 17–14; 9 plays, 47 yards, 4:22
- (0:00) Ole Miss – Gary Wunderlich 37 yard field goal Tied 17–17; 5 plays, 55 yards, 0:43

Third Quarter

- (13:09) Ole Miss – Damore'ea Stringfellow 23 yard pasas from Chad Kelly (Gary Wunderlich kick) Ole Miss 24–17; 6 plays, 60 yards, 1:51
- (9:13) Arkansas – Jared Cornelius 30 yard pass from Brandon Allen (Cole Hedlund kick) Tied 24–24; 7 plays, 82 yards, 3:56
- (7:38) Ole Miss – Chad Kelly 3 yard run (Gary Wunderlich kick) Ole Miss 31–24; 6 plays, 75 yards, 1:35
- (2:14) Arkansas – Kody Walker 3 yard run (Cole Hedlund kick) Tied 31–31; 11 plays, 83 yards, 5:24

Fourth Quarter

- (12:20) Arkansas – Drew Morgan 10 yard pass from Brandon Allen (Cole Hedlund kick) Arkansas 38–31; 7 plays, 72 yards, 3:06
- (10:30) Ole Miss – Laquon Treadwell 17 yard pass from Chad Kelly (Gary Wunderlich kick) Tied 38–38; 6 plays, 83 yards, 1:50
- (4:55) Ole Miss – Quincy Adeboyejo 18 yard pass from Chad Kelly (Gary Wunderlich kick) Ole Miss 45–38; 6 plays, 81 yards, 2:34
- (0:53) Arkansas – Dominique Reed 17 yard pass from Brandon Allen (Cole Hedlund kick) Tied 45–45; 8 plays, 75 yards, 4:02

Overtime

- Ole Miss – Chad Kelly 8 yard run (Gary Wunderlich kick) Ole Miss 52–45; 3 plays, 25 yards
- Arkansas – Drew Morgan 9 yard pass from Brandon Allen (2-pt. conversion attempt successful) Arkansas 53–52; 6 plays, 25 yards

Top Passers

- ARK – Brandon Allen – 33/45, 442 yards, 6 TD
- MISS – Chad Kelly – 24/24, 368 yards, 3 TD

Top Rushers

- ARK – Alex Collins – 17 carries, 108 yards
- MISS – Chad Kelly – 11 carries, 110 yards, 3 TD

Top Receiving

- ARK – Drew Morgan – 9 receptions, 122 yards, 3 TD
- MISS – Laquon Treadwell – 7 receptions, 132 yards, TD

=== At No. 9 LSU ===
Arkansas Razorbacks at #9 LSU Tigers

Quarter	1	2	3	4	Total
Razorbacks	0	0	0	0	0
#9 Tigers	0	0	0	0	0

at Tiger Stadium • Baton Rouge, LA

- Date: November 14, 2015
- Game time: 6:15 p.m. CT
- Game attendance: 101,699
- TV: ESPN
- Source

Game information

First Quarter

Second Quarter

Third Quarter

Fourth Quarter

Overtime

Top Passers

- ARK –
- LSU –

Top Rushers

- ARK –
- LSU –

Top Receiving

- ARK –
- LSU –

=== Mississippi State ===
Mississippi State Bulldogs at Arkansas Razorbacks

Quarter	1	2	3	4	Total
Bulldogs	14	17	0	20	51
Razorbacks	7	14	21	8	50

at Donald W. Reynolds Razorback Stadium • Fayetteville, AR

- Date: November 21, 2015
- Game time: 6:00 p.m. CT
- Game weather: Clear, 37 °F (3 °C)
- Game attendance: 71,936
- Referee: Hubert Owens
- TV announcers (ESPN): Mike Patrick (play-by-play), Ed Cunningham (color) and Jerry Punch (sideline)
- Source

Game information

First Quarter

Second Quarter

Third Quarter

Fourth Quarter

Overtime

Top Passers

- MSU –
- ARK –

Top Rushers

- MSU –
- ARK –

Top Receiving

- MSU –
- ARK –

=== Missouri ===
Missouri Tigers at Arkansas Razorbacks

Quarter	1	2	3	4	Total
Tigers	0	0	0	0	0
Razorbacks	0	0	0	0	0

at Donald W. Reynolds Razorback Stadium • Fayetteville, AR

- Date: November 27, 2015
- Game time: 1:30 p.m. CT
- Game attendance: 65,228
- TV: CBS
- Source

Game information

First Quarter

Second Quarter

Third Quarter

Fourth Quarter

Overtime

Top Passers

- MIZZ –
- ARK –

Top Rushers

- MIZZ –
- ARK –

Top Receiving

- MIZZ –
- ARK –

=== Vs. Kansas State ===
Kansas State Wildcats vs. Arkansas Razorbacks

Quarter	1	2	3	4	Total
Wildcats	10	3	10	0	23
Razorbacks	14	10	7	14	45

at Liberty Bowl Memorial Stadium • Memphis, TN

- Date: January 2, 2016
- Game time: 1:30 p.m. CT
- Game attendance: 61,136
- Referee: Ron Snodgrass
- TV announcers (ESPN): Anish Shroff (play-by-play), Ahmad Brooks (color) and Dawn Davenport (sideline)
- Source

Game information

First Quarter

Second Quarter

Third Quarter

Fourth Quarter

Overtime

Top Passers

- KSU –
- ARK –

Top Rushers

- KSU –
- ARK –

Top Receiving

- KSU –
- ARK –

== Personnel ==
=== Coaching staff ===
Name	Position	Seasons at Arkansas	Alma mater
Bret Bielema	Head coach	3	Iowa (1992)
Dan Enos	Offensive coordinator/quarterbacks	1	Michigan State (1991)
Sam Pittman	Associate head coach/offensive line/recruiting coordinator	3	Pittsburg State (1986)
Barry Lunney Jr.	Tight ends	3	Arkansas (1996)
Michael Smith	Wide receivers	3	Kansas State (1991)
Jemal Singleton	Running backs	1	Air Force (1999)
Robb Smith	Defensive coordinator/secondary	2	Allegheny College (1997)
Vernon Hargreaves	Linebackers	1	Connecticut (1986)
Clay Jennings	Secondary	2	North Texas (1996)
Rory Segrest	Defensive line/specialists	2	Alabama (1996)
Ernest "E. K." Franks	Director of recruiting	3	Kansas State (2002)
