= 2015 LSU Tigers football team =

American college football season

2015 LSU Tigers football

Texas Bowl, W 56–27 (vacated) vs. Texas Tech
- Conference: Southeastern Conference
- Western Division

Ranking
- Coaches: No. 17
- AP: No. 16
- Record: 0–3, 9 wins vacated (0–3 SEC, 5 wins vacated)
- Head coach: Les Miles (11th season)
- Offensive coordinator: Cam Cameron (3rd season)
- Offensive scheme: Multiple
- Defensive coordinator: Kevin Steele (1st season)
- Base defense: 4–3
- Home stadium: Tiger Stadium

Uniform
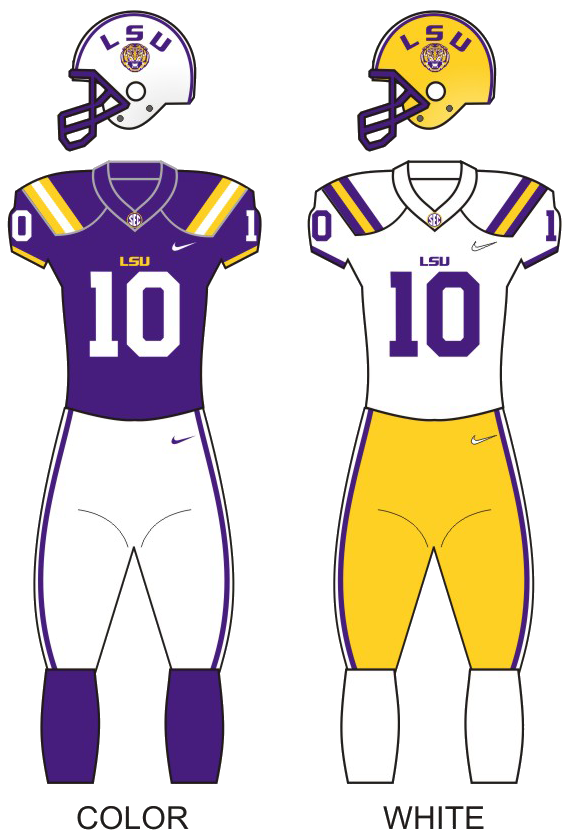

2015 Southeastern Conference football standings
| | Conf. | | | Overall |
| Team | W | | L | W | | L |
|---|---|---|---|---|---|---|
Eastern Division
| No. 25 Florida x | 7 | – | 1 | 10 | – | 4 |
| No. 22 Tennessee | 5 | – | 3 | 9 | – | 4 |
| Georgia | 5 | – | 3 | 10 | – | 3 |
| Vanderbilt | 2 | – | 6 | 4 | – | 8 |
| Kentucky | 2 | – | 6 | 5 | – | 7 |
| Missouri* | 1 | – | 7 | 5 | – | 7 |
| South Carolina | 1 | – | 7 | 3 | – | 9 |
Western Division
| No. 1 Alabama x$#^ | 7 | – | 1 | 14 | – | 1 |
| No. 10 Ole Miss | 6 | – | 2 | 10 | – | 3 |
| Arkansas | 5 | – | 3 | 8 | – | 5 |
| No. 16 LSU * | 5 | – | 3 | 9 | – | 3 |
| Texas A&M | 4 | – | 4 | 8 | – | 5 |
| Mississippi State | 4 | – | 4 | 9 | – | 4 |
| Auburn | 2 | – | 6 | 7 | – | 6 |
Championship: Alabama 29, Florida 15
# – College Football Playoff champion; ^ – College Football Playoff participant; $ – Conference champion; x – Division champion/co-champions; * LSU and Missouri vacated all wins due to NCAA violations.; Rankings from AP Poll

The 2015 LSU Tigers football team represented Louisiana State University as a member of the Western Division of the Southeastern Conference (SEC) during the 2015 NCAA Division I FBS football season. Led by 11th-year head coach Les Miles, the Tigers finished the season with an overall record of 9–3 and mark of 5–3 in conference play, tying for third place in the SEC's Western Division. LSU was invited to the Texas Bowl, where the Tigers defeated Texas Tech. The team played home games Tiger Stadium in Baton Rouge, Louisiana.

In 2023, the National Collegiate Athletic Association (NCAA) vacated all of LSU's wins from the 2012 through 2015 seasons due to an ineligible player.

== Offseason ==
LSU lost only three underclassmen to the NFL in the offseason: linebacker Kwon Alexander, cornerback Jalen Collins and defensive end Danielle Hunter; this was a large decrease compared to losing 11 underclassmen in 2012 and 7 in 2013. On January 16 Les Miles held a press conference announcing that six underclassmen starters would return, including leading receiver Travin Dural and star defensive back Jalen Mills, as well as offensive linemen Vadal Alexander and Jerald Hawkins, tight end Dillon Gordon, and linebacker Lamar Louis.

For the third consecutive season, LSU signed a top-ten recruiting class consisting of 25 signees, highlighted by top-rated recruits Kevin Toliver II, Arden Key, Tyron Johnson, and Donte Jackson. While not as acclaimed as the previous season's consensus #2 ranked class, the class was ranked #10 by ESPN, #8 by rivals.com, and #5 by 24/7 sports.

In 2023, all wins for the 2014 season were vacated by the NCAA.

=== Players drafted ===
| Round | Pick | Player | Position | NFL team |
|---|---|---|---|---|
| 2 | 42 | Jalen Collins | Defensive back | Atlanta Falcons |
| 3 | 88 | Danielle Hunter | Defensive lineman | Minnesota Vikings |
| 4 | 124 | Kwon Alexander | Linebacker | Tampa Bay Buccaneers |
| 7 | 235 | Kenny Hilliard | Running back | Houston Texans |

=== Class of 2015 signees ===
College recruiting information (2015)
| Name | Hometown | School | Height | Weight | Commit date |
|---|---|---|---|---|---|
| Nick Brossette; RB | Baton Rouge, Louisiana | University Laboratory School | 6 ft 0 in (1.83 m) | 211 lb (96 kg) | Aug 26, 2013 |
| Nick Brossette; RB | Recruit ratings: Scout: Rivals: 247Sports: ESPN: | | | | |
| George Brown Jr. OT | Cincinnati | Winton Woods High School | 6 ft 6 in (1.98 m) | 274 lb (124 kg) | Dec 6, 2014 |
| George Brown Jr. OT | Recruit ratings: Scout: Rivals: 247Sports: ESPN: | | | | |
| Jeremy Cutrer; DB | Kentwood, Louisiana | Mississippi Gulf Coast Comm College | 6 ft 2 in (1.88 m) | 175 lb (79 kg) | Sep 23, 2014 |
| Jeremy Cutrer; DB | Recruit ratings: Scout: Rivals: 247Sports: ESPN: | | | | |
| Derrick Dillon; WR | Franklinton, Louisiana | Pine High School | 5 ft 11 in (1.80 m) | 175 lb (79 kg) | Feb 4, 2015 |
| Derrick Dillon; WR | Recruit ratings: Scout: Rivals: 247Sports: ESPN: | | | | |
| David Ducre; RB | Mandeville, Louisiana | Lakeshore High School | 6 ft 0 in (1.83 m) | 220 lb (100 kg) | Feb 19, 2014 |
| David Ducre; RB | Recruit ratings: Scout: Rivals: 247Sports: ESPN: | | | | |
| Blake Ferguson; LS | Buford, Georgia | Buford High School | 6 ft 3 in (1.91 m) | 235 lb (107 kg) | Sep 22, 2013 |
| Blake Ferguson; LS | Recruit ratings: Scout: Rivals: 247Sports: ESPN: | | | | |
| Jazz Ferguson; WR | Saint Francisville, Louisiana | West Feliciana High School | 6 ft 5 in (1.96 m) | 197 lb (89 kg) | Feb 19, 2014 |
| Jazz Ferguson; WR | Recruit ratings: Scout: Rivals: 247Sports: ESPN: | | | | |
| Lanard Fournette; RB | New Orleans | Saint Augustine High School | 5 ft 10 in (1.78 m) | 184 lb (83 kg) | Jan 24, 2015 |
| Lanard Fournette; RB | Recruit ratings: Scout: Rivals: 247Sports: ESPN: | | | | |
| Josh Growden; K | Australia | Clare H.S. | 6 ft 2 in (1.88 m) | 190 lb (86 kg) | Feb 4, 2015 |
| Josh Growden; K | Recruit ratings: Scout: Rivals: 247Sports: ESPN: | | | | |
| Derrius Guice; RB | Baton Rouge, Louisiana | Catholic High School | 5 ft 11 in (1.80 m) | 215 lb (98 kg) | May 31, 2014 |
| Derrius Guice; RB | Recruit ratings: Scout: Rivals: 247Sports: ESPN: | | | | |
| Donte Jackson; ATH | Jefferson, Louisiana | Riverdale High School | 5 ft 11 in (1.80 m) | 170 lb (77 kg) | Jan 21, 2015 |
| Donte Jackson; ATH | Recruit ratings: Scout: Rivals: 247Sports: ESPN: | | | | |
| Tyron Johnson; WR | New Orleans | Warren Easton High School | 6 ft 1 in (1.85 m) | 185 lb (84 kg) | Jan 2, 2015 |
| Tyron Johnson; WR | Recruit ratings: Scout: Rivals: 247Sports: ESPN: | | | | |
| Arden Key; DE | Lithonia, Georgia | Hapeville Charter High School | 6 ft 5 in (1.96 m) | 225 lb (102 kg) | Feb 2, 2015 |
| Arden Key; DE | Recruit ratings: Scout: Rivals: 247Sports: ESPN: | | | | |
| Xavier Lewis; DB | Laplace, Louisiana | East Saint John High School | 5 ft 11 in (1.80 m) | 183 lb (83 kg) | Jul 8, 2014 |
| Xavier Lewis; DB | Recruit ratings: Scout: Rivals: 247Sports: ESPN: | | | | |
| Adrian Magee; OT | Franklinton, Louisiana | Franklinton High School | 6 ft 4 in (1.93 m) | 310 lb (140 kg) | Apr 27, 2014 |
| Adrian Magee; OT | Recruit ratings: Scout: Rivals: 247Sports: ESPN: | | | | |
| Brandon Martin; WR | Dallas, Texas | Prime Prep Academy | 6 ft 3 in (1.91 m) | 185 lb (84 kg) | Feb 4, 2015 |
| Brandon Martin; WR | Recruit ratings: Scout: Rivals: 247Sports: ESPN: | | | | |
| Justin McMillan; QB | Cedar Hill, Texas | Cedar Hill High School | 6 ft 2 in (1.88 m) | 170 lb (77 kg) | Jun 11, 2014 |
| Justin McMillan; QB | Recruit ratings: Scout: Rivals: 247Sports: ESPN: | | | | |
| Foster Moreau; TE | New Orleans | Jesuit High School | 6 ft 4 in (1.93 m) | 225 lb (102 kg) | Feb 4, 2015 |
| Foster Moreau; TE | Recruit ratings: Scout: Rivals: 247Sports: ESPN: | | | | |
| Bry'Kiethon Mouton; TE | Lafayette, Louisiana | Acadiana High School | 6 ft 1 in (1.85 m) | 240 lb (110 kg) | Aug 1, 2014 |
| Bry'Kiethon Mouton; TE | Recruit ratings: Scout: Rivals: 247Sports: ESPN: | | | | |
| Hanner Shipley; DE | Marble Falls, Texas | Faith Academy of Marble Falls | 6 ft 5 in (1.96 m) | 275 lb (125 kg) | Jan 8, 2014 |
| Hanner Shipley; DE | Recruit ratings: Scout: Rivals: 247Sports: ESPN: | | | | |
| Maea Teuhema; OG | Keller, Texas | Keller High School | 6 ft 5 in (1.96 m) | 330 lb (150 kg) | Feb 5, 2014 |
| Maea Teuhema; OG | Recruit ratings: Scout: Rivals: 247Sports: ESPN: | | | | |
| Kevin Toliver II; DB | Jacksonville, Florida | Trinity Christian Academy | 6 ft 2 in (1.88 m) | 193 lb (88 kg) | Nov 4, 2012 |
| Kevin Toliver II; DB | Recruit ratings: Scout: Rivals: 247Sports: ESPN: | | | | |
| Chidi Valentine-Okeke; OT | Ludowici, Georgia | Faith Baptist Christian Academy | 6 ft 6 in (1.98 m) | 305 lb (138 kg) | Jan 29, 2015 |
| Chidi Valentine-Okeke; OT | Recruit ratings: Scout: Rivals: 247Sports: ESPN: | | | | |
| Isaiah Washington; DE | New Orleans | Edna Karr High School | 6 ft 4 in (1.93 m) | 245 lb (111 kg) | Feb 15, 2014 |
| Isaiah Washington; DE | Recruit ratings: Scout: Rivals: 247Sports: ESPN: | | | | |
| Toby Weathersby; OG | Houston | Westfield High School | 6 ft 5 in (1.96 m) | 295 lb (134 kg) | Feb 4, 2015 |
| Toby Weathersby; OG | Recruit ratings: Scout: Rivals: 247Sports: ESPN: | | | | |
Overall recruit ranking: Scout: 12 Rivals: 8 247Sports: 5 ESPN: 10
Note: In many cases, Scout, Rivals, 247Sports, On3, and ESPN may conflict in their listings of height and weight.; In these cases, the average was taken. ESPN grades are on a 100-point scale.; Sources: "2015 LSU Football Commitment List". Rivals.; "Louisiana State College Football Recruiting Commits". Scout.; "LSU Tigers". ESPN.; "Scout.com Team Recruiting Rankings". Scout.; "2015 Team Ranking". Rivals.com.

== Coaching staff ==
| Name | Position | Seasons at LSU | Alma mater |
|---|---|---|---|
| Les Miles | Head coach | 11 | Michigan (1976) |
| Frank Wilson | Running backs/Recruiting coordinator | 6 | Nicholls State (1997) |
| Bradley Dale Peveto | Special teams/ Defensive Assistiant | 6 | Southern Methodist (1987) |
| Cam Cameron | Offensive coordinator/quarterbacks | 3 | Indiana (1983) |
| Jeff Grimes | Offensive line/Running game coordinator | 2 | Texas – El Paso (1991) |
| Kevin Steele | Defensive coordinator | 1 | Tennessee (1979) |
| Steve Ensminger | Tight ends | 6 | LSU (1982) |
| Corey Raymond | Defensive backs | 3 | LSU (1992) |
| Ed Orgeron | Defensive line | 1 | Northwestern State (1984) |
| Tony Ball | Wide receivers | 1 | UT-Chattanooga (1983) |

== Depth chart ==
The official opening day depth chart was released on August 31, 2015.

Defense

FS
28 Jalen Mills, Sr
29 Rickey Jefferson, Jr
23 Corey Thompson, Jr

| WLB | MIKE | SLB |
|---|---|---|
| 45 Deion Jones, Sr | 52 Kendell Beckwith, Jr | 11 Lamar Louis, Sr |
| 48 Donnie Alexander, So | 22 Ronnie Feist, Jr | 40 Duke Riley, Jr |
| 35 Devin Voorhies, So | 90 Rob Snyder, Sr | ⋅ |

SS
33 Jamal Adams, So
26 John Battle, So
⋅

CB
13 Dwayne Thomas, Jr
2 Kevin Toliver II, Fr
24 Edward Paris, So

| DE | DT | DT | DE |
|---|---|---|---|
| 92 Lewis Neal, Jr | 57 Davon Godchaux, So | 91 Christian LaCouture, So | 46 Tashawn Bower, Jr |
| 58 Sione Teuhema, So | 97 Frank Herron, So | 99 Greg Gilmore, So | 49 Arden Key, Fr |
| 98 Deondre Clark, So | 95 Quentin Thomas, Sr | 95 Quentin Thomas, Sr | 93 M.J. Patterson, So |

CB
18 Tre'Davious White, Jr
1 Donte Jackson, Fr
39 Russell Gage, So

Offense

WR
83 Travin Dural, Jr
9 John Diarse, So
8 Trey Quinn, So

| LT | LG | C | RG | RT |
|---|---|---|---|---|
| 65 Jerald Hawkins, Jr | 64 Will Clapp, Fr | 77 Ethan Pocic, Jr | 76 Josh Boutte, Jr | 74 Vadal Alexander, Sr |
| 63 K.J. Malone, So | 75 Maea Teuhema, Fr | 72 Andy Dodd, So | 64 Will Clapp, Fr | 66 Toby Weathersby, Fr |
| ⋅ | 63 K.J. Malone, So | ⋅ | 78 Garrett Brumfield, Fr | 70 George Brown Jr., Fr |

TE
85 Dillon Gordon, Sr
81 Colin Jeter, Jr
89 DeSean Smith, Jr

WR
15 Malachi Dupre, So
82 D. J. Chark, So
9 John Diarse, So

QB
6 Brandon Harris, So
10 Anthony Jennings, Jr
12 Justin McMillan, Fr

FB
44 John David Moore, So
47 Bry'Keithon Mouton, Fr
41 David Ducre, Fr

Special teams
PK 14 Trent Domingue, Jr
PK 42 Colby Delahoussaye, Jr
P 38 Jamie Keehn, Jr
KR 7 Leonard Fournette, So
PR 18 Tre'Davious White, Jr
LS 50 Reid Ferguson, Sr
H 16 Brad Kragthorpe, Sr

RB
7 Leonard Fournette, So
34 Darrel Williams, So
5 Derrius Guice, Fr

== Schedule ==
| Date | Time | Opponent | Rank | Site | TV | Result | Attendance |
|---|---|---|---|---|---|---|---|
| September 5 | 6:30 p.m. | McNeese State | No. 14 | Tiger Stadium; Baton Rouge, LA | SECN | ^{[a]} | |
| September 12 | 8:15 p.m. | at No. 25 Mississippi State | No. 14 | Davis Wade Stadium; Starkville, MS (rivalry) | ESPN | W 21–19 (vacated) | 62,531 |
| September 19 | 2:30 p.m. | No. 18 Auburn | No. 13 | Tiger Stadium; Baton Rouge, LA (Tiger Bowl / SEC Nation) | CBS | W 45–21 (vacated) | 102,321 |
| September 26 | 11:00 a.m. | at Syracuse* | No. 8 | Carrier Dome; Syracuse, NY | ESPN | W 34–24 (vacated) | 43,101 |
| October 3 | 6:00 p.m. | Eastern Michigan* | No. 9 | Tiger Stadium; Baton Rouge, LA | ESPNU | W 44–22 (vacated) | 102,321 |
| October 10 | 2:30 p.m. | at South Carolina | No. 7 | Tiger Stadium; Baton Rouge, LA^{[b]} | ESPN | W 45–24 (vacated) | 42,058 |
| October 17 | 6:00 p.m. | No. 8 Florida | No. 6 | Tiger Stadium; Baton Rouge, LA (rivalry) | ESPN | W 35–28 (vacated) | 102,321 |
| October 24 | 6:00 p.m. | Western Kentucky*^{†} | No. 5 | Tiger Stadium; Baton Rouge, LA | ESPNU | W 48–20 (vacated) | 101,561 |
| November 7 | 7:00 p.m. | at No. 4 Alabama | No. 2 | Bryant–Denny Stadium; Tuscaloosa, AL (rivalry) (College GameDay) | CBS | L 16–30 | 101,821 |
| November 14 | 6:15 p.m. | Arkansas | No. 9 | Tiger Stadium; Baton Rouge, LA (Golden Boot) | ESPN | L 14–31 | 101,699 |
| November 21 | 2:30 p.m. | at No. 22 Ole Miss | No. 15 | Vaught–Hemingway Stadium; Oxford, MS (Magnolia Bowl) | CBS | L 17–38 | 60,705 |
| November 28 | 6:30 p.m. | Texas A&M | | Tiger Stadium; Baton Rouge, LA (rivalry) | SECN | W 19–7 (vacated) | 101,803 |
| December 29 | 8:00 p.m. | vs. Texas Tech* | No. 20 | NRG Stadium; Houston, TX (Texas Bowl) | ESPN | W 56–27 (vacated) | 71,054 |
*Non-conference game; ^{†}Homecoming; Rankings from AP Poll and CFP Rankings; All times are in Central time

^{^[a]}The game between LSU and McNeese State was canceled due to inclement weather. The game was delayed due to lightning after 5 minutes of play during which each team held the ball for one drive and no one scored. Both schools' athletic directors decided not to reschedule the game, thus declaring it a "no contest". LSU did agree to pay McNeese State its promised fee of $500,000.
^{^[b]}The game between LSU and South Carolina was originally scheduled to take place in Columbia, South Carolina. However, in light of massive flooding in Columbia earlier in the week, the game was moved to Baton Rouge.
Schedule source:

== Rankings ==
Ranking movements Legend: ██ Increase in ranking ██ Decrease in ranking — = Not ranked RV = Received votes ( ) = First-place votes
| | Week | | | | | | | | | | | | | | | |
| Poll | Pre | 1 | 2 | 3 | 4 | 5 | 6 | 7 | 8 | 9 | 10 | 11 | 12 | 13 | 14 | Final |
|---|---|---|---|---|---|---|---|---|---|---|---|---|---|---|---|---|
| AP | 14 | 14 | 13 | 8 (1) | 9 | 7 | 6 | 5 (1) | 4 (5) | 4 (5) | 9 | 17 | RV | 23 | 22 | 16 |
| Coaches | 13 | 15 | 14 | 9 | 8 | 5 (1) | 5 (1) | 5 (1) | 4 (1) | 4 (1) | 9 | 17 | RV | 23 | 21 | 17 |
| CFP | Not released | | | | | | | | | 2 | 9 | 15 | — | 21 | 20 | Not released |

== Season summary ==
=== At Mississippi State ===
No. 14 LSU Tigers at No. 25 Mississippi State Bulldogs – Game Summary

| Quarter | 1 | 2 | 3 | 4 | Total |
|---|---|---|---|---|---|
| No. 15 Tigers | 14 | 0 | 7 | 0 | 21 |
| No. 25 Bulldogs | 0 | 3 | 3 | 13 | 19 |

at Davis Wade Stadium, Starkville, Mississippi

- Date: September 12, 2015
- Game time: 9:15 p.m. EST
- Game weather: Clear Skies • Temperature: 64 °F (18 °C) • Wind: NW 5 mph
- Game attendance: 62,531
- Referee: Hubert Owens
- TV announcers (ESPN): Dave Pasch (play-by-play), Brian Griese (color) and Tom Luginbill (sideline)

Game information

First quarter

- LSU – Leonard Fournette 1 Yd Run (Trent Domingue Kick), 4:37. LSU 7–0. Drive: 8 plays, 48 yards, 4:22.
- LSU – Leonard Fournette 26 Yd Run (Trent Domingue Kick), 1:58. LSU 14–0. Drive: 2 plays, 46 yards, 0:38.

Second quarter

- MSU – Westin Graves 43 Yd Field Goal, 0:45. LSU 14–3. Drive: 9 plays, 37 yards, 2:02.

Third quarter

- MSU – Westin Graves 24 Yd Field Goal, 10:04. LSU 14–6. Drive: 9 plays, 40 yards, 2:50.
- LSU – Leonard Fournette 18 Yd Run (Trent Domingue Kick), 6:48. LSU 21–6. Drive: 7 plays, 75 yards, 3:16.

Fourth quarter

- MSU – Dak Prescott 1 Yd Run (Westin Graves Kick), 14:45. Ole Miss 35–14. Drive: 14 plays, 87 yards, 4:18
- MSU – De'Runnya Wilson 5 Yd pass from Dak Prescott (Two-Point Conversion Failed), 4:00. Ole Miss 42–14. Drive: 6 plays, 82 yards, 1:32.

Top passers

- LSU – Brandon Harris – 9/14, 71 yards
- MSU – Dak Prescott – 34/53, 335 yards, 1 TD

Top rushers

- LSU – Leonard Fournette – 25 rushes, 159 yards, 3 TD
- MSU – Brandon Holloway – 5 rushes, 37 yards

Top receivers

- LSU – DeSean Smith – 1 reception, 23 yards
- MSU – De'Runnya Wilson – 8 receptions, 86 yards, 1 TD

=== Auburn ===
No. 18 Auburn Tigers at No. 13 LSU Tigers – Game summary

| Quarter | 1 | 2 | 3 | 4 | Total |
|---|---|---|---|---|---|
| No. 18 Auburn Tigers | 0 | 0 | 14 | 7 | 21 |
| No. 13 LSU Tigers | 14 | 10 | 14 | 7 | 45 |

at Tiger Stadium • Baton Rouge, Louisiana

- Date: September 19, 2015
- Game time: 2:39 p.m.
- Game weather: Temperature: 91 °F (33 °C) • Wind 8 mph (13 km/h) NW • Weather: Partly Cloudy
- Game attendance: 102,321
- Referee: Matt Loeffler
- TV announcers (CBS): Verne Lundquist (play-by-play), Gary Danielson (analyst), Allie LaForce (sideline reporter)

Game information

First Quarter

- LSU – Brandon Harris 2 yd run (Trent Domingue kick), 13:19. LSU 7–0. Drive: 4 plays, 75 yards, 1:41.
- LSU – Colin Jeter 1 yd pass from Brandon Harris (Trent Domingue kick), 1:39. LSU 14–0. Drive: 13 plays, 78 yards, 7:33.

Second Quarter

- LSU – Trent Domingue 32 yd field goal, 6:54. LSU 17–0. Drive: 11 plays, 65 yards, 4:24.
- LSU – Leonard Fournette 40 yd run (Trent Domingue kick), 2:10. LSU 24–0. Drive: 6 plays, 95 yards, 2:52.

Third Quarter

- AUB – Jeremy Johnson 65 yd run (Daniel Carlson), 13:19. LSU 24–7. Drive: 4 plays, 75 yards, 1:41.
- LSU – Leonard Fournette 29 yd run (Trent Domingue kick), 10:56. LSU 31–7. Drive: 6 plays, 64 yards, 2:23.
- LSU – Leonard Fournette 1 yd run (Trent Domingue kick), 4:54. LSU 38–7. Driver: 2 plays, 5 yards, 0:50.
- AUB – Melvin Ray 9 yd pass from Jeremy Johnson (Daniel Carlson kick), 1:03. LSU 38–14. Drive: 6 plays, 59 yards, 3:11.

Fourth Quarter

- LSU – Brandon Harris 1 yd run (Trent Domingue kick), 11:23. LSU 45–14. Drive: 9 plays, 75 yards, 4:40.
- AUB – D'haquille Williams 10 yd pass from Jeremy Johnson (Daniel Carlson kick), 5:47. LSU 45–21. Drive: 10 plays, 70 yards, 5:36.

Top Passers

- AUB − Jeremy Johnson – 11/19, 100 yds, 2 TD, 1 INT
- LSU − Brandon Harris – 12/17, 74 yds, 1 TD

Top Rushers

- AUB − Jeremy Johnson – 12 carries, 41 yds, 1 TD
- LSU − Leonard Fournette – 19 carries, 228 yds, 3 TD

Top Receiving

- AUB − Kerryon Johnson – 3 receptions, 17 yds
- LSU − Travin Dural – 4 receptions, 27 yds

=== At Syracuse ===
No. 8 LSU Tigers at Syracuse Orange – Game summary

| Quarter | 1 | 2 | 3 | 4 | Total |
|---|---|---|---|---|---|
| No. 8 Tigers | 7 | 0 | 17 | 10 | 34 |
| Orange | 0 | 3 | 7 | 14 | 24 |

at Carrier Dome • Syracuse, New York

- Date: September 26, 2015
- Game time: 12:00 p.m.
- Game attendance: 43,101
- TV announcers (ESPN): Bob Wischusen (play-by-play) and Brock Huard (analyst)

Game information

First Quarter

- LSU – Leonard Fournette 14 Yd Run (Trent Domingue Kick), 3:56. LSU 7–0. Drive: 6 plays, 91 yards, 3:26.

Second Quarter

- SYR – Cole Murphy 43 Yd Field Goal, 6:58. LSU 7–3. Drive: 9 plays, 33 yards, 4:42.

Third Quarter

- LSU – Trent Domingue 21 Yd Field Goal, 9:44. LSU 10–3. Drive: 12 plays, 76 yards, 5:16.
- LSU – Tre'Davious White 69 Yd Punt Return (Trent Domingue Kick), 7:48. LSU 17–3. Drive: 0 plays, 0 yards, 0:00.
- SYR – Brisly Estime 40 Yd pass from Zack Mahoney (Cole Murphy Kick), 6:02. LSU 17–10. Driver: 3 plays, 67 yards, 1:46.
- LSU – Leonard Fournette 62 Yd Run (Trent Domingue Kick), 4:09. LSU 24–10. Drive: 4 plays, 75 yards, 1:53.

Fourth Quarter

- SYR – Ben Lewis 2 Yd pass from Zack Mahoney (Cole Murphy Kick), 12:06. LSU 24–17. Drive: 7 plays, 56 yards, 2:40.
- LSU – Malachi Dupre 11 Yd pass from Brandon Harris (Trent Domingue Kick), 9:14. LSU 31–17. Drive: 6 plays, 73 yards, 2:52.
- LSU – Trent Domingue 37 Yd Field Goal, 5:11. LSU 34–17. Drive: 6 plays, 6 yards, 2:33.
- SYR – Dontae Strickland 5 Yd pass from Zack Mahoney (Cole Murphy Kick), 1:53. LSU 34–24. Drive: 16 plays, 75 yards, 3:18.

Top Passers

- LSU – Brandon Harris – 8/16, 157 yards, 1 TD
- SYR – Zack Mahoney – 16/38, 154 yards, 3 TD, 1 INT

Top rushers

- LSU – Leonard Fournette – 26 rushes, 244 yards, 2 TD
- SYR – Zack Mahoney – 7 rushes, 40 yards

Top receivers

- LSU – Malachi Dupre – 4 receptions, 73 yards, 1 TD
- SYR – Brisly Estime – 2 receptions, 50 yards, 1 TD

=== Eastern Michigan ===
Eastern Michigan Eagles at No. 9 LSU Tigers – Game summary

| Quarter | 1 | 2 | 3 | 4 | Total |
|---|---|---|---|---|---|
| Eagles | 0 | 14 | 8 | 0 | 22 |
| No. 9 Tigers | 14 | 6 | 10 | 14 | 44 |

at Tiger Stadium • Baton Rouge, Louisiana

- Date: October 3, 2015
- Game time: 7:00 p.m.
- Game attendance: 102,321
- TV announcers (ESPNU): Allen Bestwick (play-by-play) and Dan Hawkins (analyst)

Game information

First Quarter

- LSU – Leonard Fournette 3 Yd Run (Trent Domingue Kick), 10:40. LSU 7–0. Drive: 8 plays, 73 yards, 2:42.
- LSU – Brandon Harris 21 Yd Run (Trent Domingue Kick), 7:18. LSU 14–0. Drive: 4 plays, 66 yards, 1:36.

Second Quarter

- LSU – Trent Domingue 26 yd field goal, 6:45. LSU 17–0. Drive: 9 plays, 66 yards, 3:51.
- EMU – Shaq Vann 6 Yd Run (Dylan Mulder Kick), 2:48. LSU 17–7. Drive: 8 plays, 59 yards, 3:57.
- EMU – Darius Jackson 1 Yd Run (Dylan Mulder Kick), 2:10. LSU 17–14. Drive: 2 plays, 3 yards, 0:20.
- LSU – Trent Domingue 45 Yd Field Goal, 0:10. LSU 20–14. Drive: 8 plays, 48 yards, 2:00.

Third Quarter

- LSU – Leonard Fournette 75 Yd Run (Trent Domingue Kick), 14:48. LSU 27–14. Drive: 1 play, 75 yards, 0:12.
- LSU – Trent Domingue 22 Yd Field Goal, 2:17. LSU 30–14. Drive: 8 plays, 56 yards, 3:27.
- EMU – Dustin Creel 12 Yd pass from Brogan Roback (Eddie Daugherty Pass to Brogan Roback), 0:52. LSU 30–22. Driver: 4 plays, 66 yards, 1:25.

Fourth Quarter

- LSU – Leonard Fournette 11 Yd Run (Trent Domingue Kick), 14:09. LSU 37–22. Drive: 5 plays, 43 yards, 1:43.
- LSU – Deion Jones 26 Yd Interception Return (Trent Domingue Kick), 12:37. LSU 44–22. Drive: 0 plays, 0 yards, 0:00.

Top Passers

- EMU − Brogan Roback – 17/24, 161 yds, 1 TD, 3 INT
- LSU − Brandon Harris – 4/14, 80 yds

Top Rushers

- EMU − Darius Jackson – 19 carries, 66 yds, 1 TD
- LSU − Leonard Fournette – 26 carries, 233 yds, 3 TD

Top Receiving

- EMU − Sam Browning – 6 receptions, 87 yds
- LSU − Colin Jeter – 1 reception, 28 yds

=== South Carolina ===
South Carolina Gamecocks at No. 7 LSU Tigers – Game summary

| Quarter | 1 | 2 | 3 | 4 | Total |
|---|---|---|---|---|---|
| Gamecocks | 3 | 7 | 14 | 0 | 24 |
| No. 7 Tigers | 7 | 10 | 21 | 7 | 45 |

at Tiger Stadium • Baton Rouge, Louisiana

- Date: October 10, 2015
- Game time: 12:30 p.m.
- Game attendance: 43,101

Game information

First Quarter

- SC – Elliott Fry 21 Yd Field Goal, 11:02. South Carolina 3–0. Drive: 13 plays, 62 yards, 3:58.
- LSU – Darrel Williams 4 Yd Run (Trent Domingue Kick), 5:15. LSU 7–3. Drive: 3 plays, 75 yards, 5:47.

Second Quarter

- LSU – Malachi Dupre 10 Yd pass from Brandon Harris (Trent Domingue Kick), 7:41. LSU 14–3. Drive: 11 plays, 67 yards, 5:42.
- SC – Rashad Fenton 96 Yd Kickoff Return (Elliott Fry Kick), 7:27. LSU 14–10. Driver: 0 plays, 0 yards, 0:00.
- LSU – Trent Domingue 29 Yd Field Goal, 0:00. LSU 17–10. Drive: 10 plays, 54 yards, 1:19.

Third Quarter

- LSU – Leonard Fournette 87 Yd Run (Trent Domingue Kick), 14:01. LSU 24–10. Drive: 2 plays, 90 yards, 0:51.
- LSU – Travin Dural 62 Yd pass from Brandon Harris (Trent Domingue Kick), 6:29. LSU 31–10. Drive: 10 plays, 80 yards, 6:11.
- SC – Jerell Adams 36 Yd pass from Perry Orth (Elliott Fry Kick), 5:02. LSU 31–17. Driver: 5 plays, 60 yards, 1:21.
- LSU – Darrel Williams 1 Yd Run (Trent Domingue Kick), 1:55. LSU 38–17. Drive: 6 plays, 75 yards, 3:07.
- SC – Pharoh Cooper 43 Yd pass from Perry Orth (Elliott Fry Kick), 0:39. LSU 38–24. Driver: 3 plays, 61 yards, 1:14.

Fourth Quarter

- LSU – Derrius Guice 4 Yd Run (Trent Domingue Kick), 13:15. LSU 45–24. Drive: 6 plays, 67 yards, 2:13.

Top Passers

- SC − Perry Orth – 14/28, 200 yds, 2 TD, 1 INT
- LSU − Brandon Harris – 18/28, 228 yds, 2 TD

Top Rushers

- SC − Shon Carson – 16 carries, 26 yds
- LSU − Derrius Guice – 16 carries, 161 yds, 1 TD

Top Receiving

- SC − Pharoh Cooper – 7 receptions, 105 yds, 1 TD
- LSU − Travin Dural – 4 reception, 109 yds, 1 TD

=== Florida ===
No. 8 Florida Gators at No. 6 LSU Tigers – Game summary

| Quarter | 1 | 2 | 3 | 4 | Total |
|---|---|---|---|---|---|
| No. 8 Gators | 7 | 7 | 14 | 0 | 28 |
| No. 6 Tigers | 0 | 28 | 0 | 7 | 35 |

at Tiger Stadium • Baton Rouge, Louisiana

- Date: October 17, 2015
- Game time: 12:30 p.m.
- Game weather: Temperature: 74 °F (23 °C) • Wind: NNW at 6 miles per hour (9.7 km/h) • Weather: Partly cloudy
- Game attendance: 102,321
- Referee: Matt Loeffler
- TV announcers (ESPN): Brad Nessler (play-by-play) and Todd Blackledge (color)

Game information

First Quarter

- FLA – Jake McGee 4 Yd pass from Treon Harris (Jorge Powell Kick), 10:13. Florida 7–0. Drive: 4 plays, 13 yards, 2:06.

Second Quarter

- LSU – Leonard Fournette 2 Yd Run (Trent Domingue Kick), 12:23. Tied 7–7. Drive: 11 plays, 88 yards, 5:09.
- LSU – Malachi Dupre 9 Yd pass from Brandon Harris (Trent Domingue Kick), 5:00. LSU 14–7. Driver: 9 plays, 67 yards, 5:12.
- LSU – Leonard Fournette 6 Yd Run (Trent Domingue Kick), 2:24. LSU 21–7. Drive: 2 plays, 58 yards, 0:50.
- FLA – Jake McGee 19 Yd pass from Treon Harris (Austin Hardin Kick), 1:34. LSU 21–14. Drive: 4 plays, 80 yards, 0:50.
- LSU – Malachi Dupre 50 Yd pass from Brandon Harris (Trent Domingue Kick), 0:15. LSU 28–14. Drive: 5 plays, 75 yards, 1:20.

Third Quarter

- FLA – Kelvin Taylor 2 Yd Run (Austin Hardin Kick), 8:01. LSU 28–21. Drive: 10 plays, 66 yards, 5:10.
- FLA – Antonio Callaway 72 Yd Punt Return (Austin Hardin Kick), 1:04. Tied 28–28. Drive: 0 plays, 0 yards, 0:00.

Fourth Quarter

- LSU – Trent Domingue 16 Yd Run (Trent Domingue Kick), 10:40. LSU 35–28. Drive: 11 plays, 75 yards, 5:24.

Top Passers

- FLA − Treon Harris – 17/32, 271 yds, 2 TD
- LSU − Brandon Harris – 13/19, 202 yds, 2 TD

Top Rushers

- FLA − Kelvin Taylor – 15 carries, 25 yds, 1 TD
- LSU − Leonard Fournette – 31 carries, 180 yds, 2 TD

Top Receiving

- FLA − Antonio Callaway – 3 receptions, 100 yds
- LSU − Malachi Dupre – 4 reception, 115 yds, 2 TD

=== Western Kentucky ===
Western Kentucky Hilltoppers at No. 5 LSU Tigers – Game summary

| Quarter | 1 | 2 | 3 | 4 | Total |
|---|---|---|---|---|---|
| Hilltoppers | 0 | 7 | 6 | 7 | 20 |
| No. 5 Tigers | 7 | 7 | 20 | 14 | 48 |

at Tiger Stadium • Baton Rouge, Louisiana

- Date: October 24, 2015
- Game time: 12:30 p.m.
- Game attendance: 43,101

Game information

First Quarter

- LSU – Malachi Dupre 55 Yd pass from Brandon Harris (Trent Domingue Kick), 12:13. LSU 7–0. Drive: 5 plays, 75 yards, 2:04.

Second Quarter

- WKU – Anthony Wales 7 Yd pass from Brandon Doughty (Garrett Schwettman Kick), 10:55. Tied 7–7. Driver: 9 plays, 62 yards, 2:27.
- LSU – Darrel Williams 2 Yd Run (Trent Domingue Kick), 1:25. LSU 14–7. Drive: 6 plays, 96 yards, 3:06.

Third Quarter

- LSU – Trent Domingue 34 Yd Field Goal, 10:26. LSU 17–7. Drive: 10 plays, 44 yards, 4:34.
- WKU – Antwane Grant 39 Yd pass from Brandon Doughty (Garrett Schwettman PAT failed), 8:26. LSU 17–13. Driver: 5 plays, 60 yards, 1:21.
- LSU – Trent Domingue 43 Yd Field Goal, 6:43. LSU 20–13. Drive: 3 plays, 24 yards, 0:48.
- LSU – Leonard Fournette 1 Yd Run (Trent Domingue Kick), 5:54. LSU 27–13. Driver: 3 plays, 61 yards, 1:14.
- LSU – Tyron Johnson 61 Yd pass from Brandon Harris (Trent Domingue Kick), 2:06. LSU 34–13. Driver: 3 plays, 55 yards, 1:37.

Fourth Quarter

- WKU – Taywan Taylor 9 Yd pass from Brandon Doughty (Garrett Schwettman Kick), 13:04. LSU 34–20. Drive: 10 plays, 65 yards, 4:02.
- LSU – Travin Dural 17 Yd pass from Brandon Harris (Trent Domingue Kick), 8:46. LSU 41–20. Driver: 6 plays, 50 yards, 2:59.
- LSU – Derrius Guice 47 Yd Run (Trent Domingue Kick), 1:49. LSU 34–13. Driver: 5 plays, 74 yards, 2:50.

Top Passers

- SC − Brandon Doughty – 37/61, 325 yds, 3 TD, 1 INT
- LSU − Brandon Harris – 11/20, 286 yds, 3 TD

Top Rushers

- SC − Anthony Wales – 12 carries, 54 yds
- LSU − Leonard Fournette – 126 carries, 150 yds, 1 TD

Top Receiving

- SC − Taywan Taylor – 10 receptions, 103 yds, 1 TD
- LSU − Travin Dural – 5 receptions, 132 yds, 1 TD

=== At Alabama ===
No. 2 LSU Tigers at No. 4 Alabama Crimson Tide – Game summary

| Quarter | 1 | 2 | 3 | 4 | Total |
|---|---|---|---|---|---|
| No. 2 Tigers | 0 | 10 | 0 | 6 | 16 |
| No. 4 Crimson Tide | 0 | 13 | 14 | 3 | 30 |

at Bryant–Denny Stadium • Tuscaloosa, Alabama

- Date: November 7, 2015
- Game time: 7:10 p.m.
- Game weather: Rain • Temperature: 57 °F (14 °C) • Wind: 3 mph
- Game attendance: 101,821
- Referee: Hubert Owens
- TV announcers (CBS): Verne Lundquist (play-by-play), Gary Danielson (color) and Allie LaForce (sideline)

Game information

Second quarter

- ALA - Adam Griffith 22 Yd Field Goal, 11:08 (ALA 3-0)
- ALA - Derrick Henry 2 Yd Run (Adam Griffith Kick), 8:51 (ALA 10-0)
- LSU - Travin Dural 40 Yd pass from Brandon Harris (Trent Domingue Kick), 6:12 (ALA 10-7)
- LSU - Trent Domingue 39 Yd Field Goal, (10-10)
- ALA - Adam Griffith 55 Yd Field Goal, 0:14 (ALA 13-10)

Third quarter

- ALA - Derrick Henry 1 Yd Run (Adam Griffith Kick), 13:00 (ALA 20-10)
- ALA - Derrick Henry 7 Yd Run (Adam Griffith Kick), 2:47 (ALA 27-10)

Fourth quarter

- ALA - Adam Griffith 30 Yd Field Goal, 12:45 (ALA 30-10)
- LSU - Leonard Fournette 1 Yd Run (Trent Domingue PAT blocked), 9:18 (ALA 30-16)

Top passers

- LSU – Brandon Harris 6-19, 128 YDS, 1 TD, 1 INT
- ALA – Jake Coker 18-24, 184 YDS

Top rushers

- LSU – Leonard Fournette 19 CAR, 31 YDS, 1 TD
- ALA – Derrick Henry 38 CAR, 210 YDS, 3 TD

Top Receiving

- LSU – Travin Dural 2 REC, 77 YDS, 1 TD
- ALA – Calvin Ridley 7 REC, 51 YDS

=== Arkansas ===
Arkansas Razorbacks at No. 9 LSU Tigers – Game summary

| Quarter | 1 | 2 | 3 | 4 | Total |
|---|---|---|---|---|---|
| Razorbacks | 0 | 0 | 0 | 0 | 0 |
| No. 9 Tigers | 0 | 0 | 0 | 0 | 0 |

at Tiger Stadium • Baton Rouge, LA

- Date: November 14, 2015
- Game time: 6:15 p.m. CT
- Game attendance: 101,699
- TV: ESPN
- Source

Game information

First Quarter

Second Quarter

Third Quarter

Fourth Quarter

Top Passers

- ARK –
- LSU –

Top Rushers

- ARK –
- LSU –

Top Receiving

- ARK –
- LSU –

=== At Ole Miss ===
No. 15 LSU Tigers at No. 22 Ole Miss Rebels – Game summary

| Quarter | 1 | 2 | 3 | 4 | Total |
|---|---|---|---|---|---|
| No. 15 Tigers | 0 | 7 | 10 | 0 | 17 |
| No. 22 Rebels | 3 | 21 | 14 | 0 | 38 |

at Vaught–Hemingway Stadium • Oxford, MS

- Date: November 21, 2015
- Game time: 2:30 p.m. CT
- Game weather: Cloudy • Temperature: 51 °F (11 °C)
- Game attendance: 60,705
- Referee: Ken Williamson
- TV announcers (CBS): Verne Lundquist (play-by-play), Gary Danielson (color) and Allie LaForce (sideline)

Game information

First Quarter

- (12:41) Ole Miss – Gary Wunderlich 32 yard field goal Ole Miss 3–0; 5 plays, 66 yards, 2:19

Second Quarter

- (12:30) Ole Miss – Jaylen Walton 2 yard run (Gary Wunderlich kick) Ole Miss 10–0; 8 plays, 80 yards, 2:23
- (7:13) Ole Miss – Chad Kelly 5 yard run (Gary Wunderlich kick) Ole Miss 17–0; 10 plays, 70 yards, 2:36
- (3:24) Ole Miss – Laquon Treadwell 11 yard pass from Chad Kelly (Gary Wunderlich kick) Ole Miss 24–0; 1 play, 11 yards, 0:06
- (1:14) LSU – Tyron Johnson 39 yard pass from Brandon Harris (Trent Domingue kick) Ole Miss 24–7; 6 plays, 75 yards, 2:10

Third Quarter

- (12:54) LSU – Trent Domingue 43 yard field goal Ole Miss 24–10; 6 plays, 54 yards, 2:06
- (10:04) LSU – William Clapp 0 yard fumble recovery (Trent Domingue kick) Ole Miss 24–17
- (7:34) Ole Miss – Chad Kelly 11 yard run (Gary Wunderlich kick) Ole Miss 31–17; 7 plays, 83 yards, 2:30
- (3:32) Ole Miss – Evan Engram 36 yard pass from Chad Kelly (Gary Wunderlich kick) Ole Miss 38–17; 6 plays, 57 yards, 2:15

Fourth Quarter

No scoring plays

Top Passers

- LSU – Brandon Harris – 26/51, 324 yards, TD, 2 INT
- MISS – Chad Kelly – 19/34, 280 yards, 2 TD

Top Rushers

- LSU – Leonard Fournette – 25 carries, 108 yards
- MISS – Chad Kelly – 12 carries, 81 yards, 2 TD

Top Receiving

- LSU – Tyron Johnson – 5 receptions, 83 yards, TD
- MISS – Quincy Adeboyejo – 2 receptions, 62 yards

=== Texas A&M ===
Texas A&M Aggies at LSU Tigers – Game summary

| Quarter | 1 | 2 | 3 | 4 | Total |
|---|---|---|---|---|---|
| Aggies | 7 | 0 | 0 | 0 | 7 |
| Tigers | 6 | 0 | 7 | 6 | 19 |

at Tiger Stadium • Baton Rouge, LA

- Date: November 28, 2015
- Game time: 6:30 p.m. CT
- Game attendance: 101,803
- TV: SECN

Game information

First Quarter

Second Quarter

Third Quarter

Fourth Quarter

Top Passers

- TAMU –
- LSU –

Top Rushers

- TAMU –
- LSU –

Top Receiving

- TAMU –
- LSU –

=== Vs. Texas Tech (Texas Bowl) ===
Texas Tech Red Raiders vs. No. 20 LSU Tigers (Texas Bowl) – Game summary

| Quarter | 1 | 2 | 3 | 4 | Total |
|---|---|---|---|---|---|
| Red Raiders | 6 | 7 | 7 | 7 | 27 |
| No. 20 Tigers | 14 | 7 | 21 | 14 | 56 |

at NRG Stadium • Houston, TX

- Date: December 29, 2015
- Game time: 8:00 p.m. CT
- Game weather: None (retractable roof closed)
- Game attendance: 71,054
- Referee: Land Clark
- TV announcers (ESPN): Joe Tessitore, Jesse Palmer, David Pollack, and Maria Taylor

Game information

First quarter

- LSU 11:47 – Leonard Fournette 2 yard run (Trent Domingue kick), LSU 7–0
- TTU 0:53 – Jakeem Grant 46 yard pass from Patrick Mahomes (two–point pass incomplete), LSU 7–6
- LSU 0:29 – D.J. Chark 79 yard run (Trent Domingue kick), LSU 14–6

Second quarter

- LSU 6:41 – Leonard Fournette 47 yard pass from Brandon Harris (Trent Domingue kick), LSU 21–6
- TTU 3:38 – Jakeem Grant 3 yard pass from Patrick Mahomes (Clayton Hatfield kick), LSU 21–13

Third quarter

- TTU 10:28 – Reginald Davis 31 yard pass from Patrick Mahomes (Clayton Hatfield kick), LSU 21–20
- LSU 8:17 – Leonard Fournette 43 yard run (Trent Domingue kick), LSU 28–20
- LSU 4:07 – Leonard Fournette 4 yard run (Trent Domingue kick), LSU 35–20
- LSU 0:09 – Brandon Harris 27 yard run (Trent Domingue kick), LSU 42–20

Fourth quarter

- TTU 12:20 – Jakeem Grant 4 yard pass from Patrick Mahomes (Clayton Hatfield kick), LSU 42–27
- LSU 8:16 – Leonard Fournette 2 yard run (Trent Domingue kick), LSU 49–27
- LSU 4:24 – Darrel Williams 2 yard run (Trent Domingue kick), LSU 56–27

Top Passers

- TTU – Patrick Mahomes – 28/56, 370 yards, 4 TD, INT
- LSU – Brandon Harris – 14/23, 261 yards, TD, INT

Top Rushers

- TTU – DeAndré Washington – 10 carries, 37 yards
- LSU – Leonard Fournette – 29 carries, 212 yards, 4 TD

Top Receiving

- TTU – Jakeem Grant – 10 receptions, 125 yards, 3 TD
- LSU – Malachi Dupre – 4 receptions, 96 yards
