= 2016 LSU Tigers football team =

American college football season

2016 LSU Tigers football

Citrus Bowl champion

Citrus Bowl, W 29–9 vs. Louisville
- Conference: Southeastern Conference
- Western Division

Ranking
- Coaches: No. 14
- AP: No. 13
- Record: 8–4 (5–3 SEC)
- Head coach: Les Miles (12th season; first 4 games); Ed Orgeron (interim; final 8 games)
- Offensive coordinator: Cam Cameron (4th season; first 4 games); Steve Ensminger (interim)
- Offensive scheme: Pro-style
- Defensive coordinator: Dave Aranda (1st season)
- Base defense: 3–4
- Home stadium: Tiger Stadium

Uniform
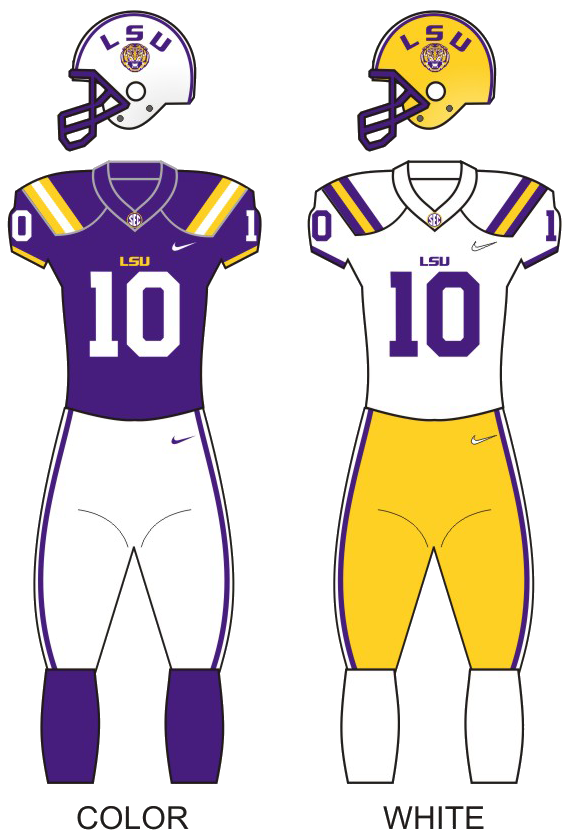

2016 Southeastern Conference football standings
| | Conf. | | | Overall |
| Team | W | | L | W | | L |
|---|---|---|---|---|---|---|
Eastern Division
| No. 14 Florida x | 6 | – | 2 | 9 | – | 4 |
| No. 22 Tennessee | 4 | – | 4 | 9 | – | 4 |
| Georgia | 4 | – | 4 | 8 | – | 5 |
| Kentucky | 4 | – | 4 | 7 | – | 6 |
| South Carolina | 3 | – | 5 | 6 | – | 7 |
| Vanderbilt | 3 | – | 5 | 6 | – | 7 |
| Missouri* | 2 | – | 6 | 4 | – | 8 |
Western Division
| No. 2 Alabama x$^ | 8 | – | 0 | 14 | – | 1 |
| No. 24 Auburn | 5 | – | 3 | 8 | – | 5 |
| No. 13 LSU | 5 | – | 3 | 8 | – | 4 |
| Texas A&M | 4 | – | 4 | 8 | – | 5 |
| Arkansas | 3 | – | 5 | 7 | – | 6 |
| Mississippi State | 3 | – | 5 | 6 | – | 7 |
| Ole Miss* | 2 | – | 6 | 5 | – | 7 |
Championship: Alabama 54, Florida 16
^ – College Football Playoff participant; $ – Conference champion; x – Division champion/co-champions; * Ole Miss and Missouri vacated all wins due to NCAA violations.; Rankings from AP Poll

The 2016 LSU Tigers football team represented Louisiana State University in the 2016 NCAA Division I FBS football season. The Tigers play their home games at Tiger Stadium in Baton Rouge, Louisiana, and compete in the Western Division of the Southeastern Conference (SEC). They finished the season 8–4, 5–3 in SEC play to finish in a tie for second place in the Western Division. They were invited to the Citrus Bowl where they defeated Louisville.

The Tigers were led by 12th year head coach Les Miles for the first four games of the year. Miles was fired on September 25, along with offensive coordinator Cam Cameron. Defensive line coach Ed Orgeron was named interim head coach, who was later promoted to full-time head coach on November 26.

== Schedule ==
| Date | Time | Opponent | Rank | Site | TV | Result | Attendance |
|---|---|---|---|---|---|---|---|
| September 3 | 2:30 p.m. | vs. Wisconsin* | No. 5 | Lambeau Field; Green Bay, WI (College GameDay) | ABC | L 14–16 | 73,128 |
| September 10 | 6:30 p.m. | No. 5 (FCS) Jacksonville State* | No. 21 | Tiger Stadium; Baton Rouge, LA | ESPNU | W 34–13 | 98,389 |
| September 17 | 6:00 p.m. | Mississippi State | No. 20 | Tiger Stadium; Baton Rouge, LA (rivalry) | ESPN2 | W 23–20 | 99,910 |
| September 24 | 5:00 p.m. | at Auburn | No. 18 | Jordan–Hare Stadium; Auburn, AL (rivalry, SEC Nation) | ESPN | L 13–18 | 87,451 |
| October 1 | 6:30 p.m. | Missouri^{†} | | Tiger Stadium; Baton Rouge, LA | SECN | W 42–7 | 102,071 |
| October 15 | 6:30 p.m. | Southern Miss* | | Tiger Stadium; Baton Rouge, LA | SECN | W 45–10 | 102,164 |
| October 22 | 8:00 p.m. | No. 23 Ole Miss | No. 25 | Tiger Stadium; Baton Rouge, LA (Magnolia Bowl) | ESPN | W 38–21 | 101,720 |
| November 5 | 7:00 p.m. | No. 1 Alabama | No. 13 | Tiger Stadium; Baton Rouge, LA (rivalry, College GameDay) | CBS | L 0–10 | 102,321 |
| November 12 | 6:00 p.m. | at No. 25 Arkansas | No. 24 | Donald W. Reynolds Razorback Stadium; Fayetteville, AR (rivalry) | ESPN | W 38–10 | 75,156 |
| November 19^{[a]} | 12:00 p.m. | No. 23 Florida | No. 16 | Tiger Stadium; Baton Rouge, LA (rivalry, SEC Nation) | SECN | L 10–16 | 102,043 |
| November 24 | 6:30 p.m. | at Texas A&M | | Kyle Field; College Station, TX (rivalry) | ESPN | W 54–39 | 102,961 |
| December 31 | 10:00 a.m. | vs. No. 13 Louisville* | No. 20 | Camping World Stadium; Orlando, FL (Citrus Bowl) | ABC | W 29–9 | 46,063 |
*Non-conference game; ^{†}Homecoming; Rankings from AP Poll and CFP Rankings after November 1 released prior to game; All times are in Central time

^{^[a]}The October 8 game between LSU and Florida was postponed in advance of the arrival of Hurricane Matthew. The game was eventually rescheduled for November 19 at Tiger Stadium, replacing the previously scheduled game against South Alabama.

== Rankings ==
Ranking movements Legend: ██ Increase in ranking ██ Decrease in ranking — = Not ranked RV = Received votes ( ) = First-place votes
| | Week | | | | | | | | | | | | | | | |
| Poll | Pre | 1 | 2 | 3 | 4 | 5 | 6 | 7 | 8 | 9 | 10 | 11 | 12 | 13 | 14 | Final |
|---|---|---|---|---|---|---|---|---|---|---|---|---|---|---|---|---|
| AP | 5 (1) | 21 | 20 | 18 | RV | RV | RV | 25 | 19 | 15 | 19 | 16 | 25 | 21 | 19 | 13 |
| Coaches | 6 | 22 | 22 | 17 | RV | RV | 25 | 23 | 19 | 14 | 19 | 14 | RV | 21 | 20 | 14 |
| CFP | Not released | | | | | | | | | 13 | 24 | 16 | — | 21 | 20 | Not released |

== Roster ==
2016 LSU Tigers football team roster
Players
Coaches
Offense

| Pos. | # | Name | Class |
|---|---|---|---|
| QB | 2 | Trey LaForge | Fr |
| RB | 4 | Nick Brossette | So |
| RB | 5 | Derrius Guice | So |
| QB | 6 | Brandon Harris | Jr |
| RB | 7 | Leonard Fournette | Jr |
| QB | 8 | Caleb Lewis | So |
| WR | 10 | Stephen Sullivan | Fr |
| WR | 11 | Dee Anderson | Fr |
| QB | 12 | Justin McMillan | Fr |
| QB | 14 | Lindsey Scott Jr. | Fr |
| WR | 15 | Malachi Dupre | Jr |
| QB | 16 | Danny Etling | Jr |
| QB | 17 | Tiger Scheyd | So |
| WR | 19 | Derrick Dillon | Fr |
| WR | 25 | Drake Davis | Fr |
| RB | 27 | Lanard Fournette | Fr |
| RB | 28 | Darrel Williams | Jr |
| WR | 29 | Louis Landrum | Fr |
| WR | 30 | Michael Ostrom | So |
| WR | 31 | Justin Jones | Fr |
| WR | 32 | Jalen Williams | Fr |
| RB | 34 | Reshaud Henry | Jr |
| WR | 39 | Russell Gage | Jr |
| FB | 41 | David Ducre | So |
| FB | 44 | John David Moore | Jr |
| FB | 47 | Bry'Kiethon Mouton | So |
| FB | 48 | Ronnie Lamarque | Fr |
| OL | 54 | Rory Luke | Fr |
| OL | 58 | Jibrail Abdul-Aziz | So |
| G | 63 | K. J. Malone | Jr |
| C | 64 | Will Clapp | So |
| OL | 65 | Jakori Savage | Fr |
| OT | 66 | Toby Weathersby | So |
| OL | 67 | Michael Smith | Fr |
| OL | 68 | Chidi Okeke | Fr |
| OL | 69 | Turner Simmers | So |
| OL | 71 | Donavaughn Campbell | Fr |
| C | 72 | Andy Dodd | Jr |
| G | 73 | Adrian Magee | Fr |
| OL | 74 | Willie Allen | Fr |
| G | 75 | Maea Teuhema | So |
| G | 76 | Josh Boutte | Sr |
| C, G | 77 | Ethan Pocic | Sr |
| G | 78 | Garrett Brumfield | So |
| OL | 79 | Lloyd Cushenberry | Fr |
| TE | 80 | Jamal Pettigrew | Fr |
| TE | 81 | Colin Jeter | Sr |
| WR | 82 | D. J. Chark | Jr |
| WR | 83 | Travin Dural | Sr |
| TE | 84 | Foster Moreau | So |
| TE | 85 | Caleb Roddy | Fr |
| WR | 86 | Jazz Ferguson | So |
| TE | 88 | Jacory Washington | So |
| TE | 89 | DeSean Smith | Sr |

Defense

| Pos. | # | Name | Class |
|---|---|---|---|
| DB | 1 | Donte Jackson | So |
| CB | 2 | Kevin Toliver II | So |
| CB | 8 | Saivion Smith | Fr |
| S | 9 | Rickey Jefferson | Sr |
| CB | 12 | Micah Dickens | Jr |
| DB | 13 | Dwayne Thomas | Sr |
| DB | 15 | Tony Westly | Jr |
| CB | 17 | Xavier Lewis | Fr |
| CB | 18 | Tre'Davious White | Sr |
| CB | 21 | Ed Paris | Jr |
| DB | 22 | Kristian Fulton | Fr |
| S | 23 | Corey Thompson | Sr |
| LB | 24 | Devin White | Fr |
| DB | 25 | T. J. Lemoine | Fr |
| S | 26 | John Battle | So |
| DB | 27 | Brandon Surtain | Sr |
| DB | 29 | Greedy Williams | Fr |
| DB | 30 | Eric Monroe | Fr |
| DB | 31 | Cameron Lewis | Fr |
| DB | 32 | Leyton Lavigne | So |
| S | 33 | Jamal Adams | Jr |
| LB | 35 | Devin Voorhies | Jr |
| LB | 40 | Duke Riley | Sr |
| DB | 41 | Abraham Wallace | So |
| LB | 43 | Ray Thornton | Fr |
| DL | 44 | Clifton Escort II | Fr |
| LB | 45 | Michael Divinity | Fr |
| DE | 46 | Tashawn Bower | Sr |
| LB | 47 | Chance Barney | Jr |
| LB | 48 | Donnie Alexander | Jr |
| DE | 49 | Arden Key | So |
| LB | 50 | Layton Garnett | Fr |
| LB | 51 | Jonathan Rucker | Jr |
| LB | 52 | Kendell Beckwith | Sr |
| LB | 53 | Ben Nola | Fr |
| DL | 54 | Justin Kairdolf | Fr |
| NT | 55 | Travonte Valentine | So |
| LB | 56 | M. J. Patterson | Jr |
| DT | 57 | Davon Godchaux | Jr |
| LB | 58 | Hunter Burns | Sr |
| DE | 59 | Jordan Harper | Sr |
| DL | 60 | Marcus Roberts | Sr |
| DL | 85 | Jamil Abdul-Aziz | Fr |
| DE | 87 | Sci Martin | Fr |
| DT | 90 | Rashard Lawrence | Fr |
| DT | 91 | Christian LaCouture | Sr |
| DE | 92 | Lewis Neal | Sr |
| DE | 93 | Andre Anthony | Fr |
| DE | 93 | Seth Newsome | Fr |
| DE | 94 | Isaiah Washington | So |
| DT | 95 | Ed Alexander | Fr |
| DE | 96 | Glen Logan | Fr |
| DT | 97 | Frank Herron | Jr |
| DE | 98 | Deondre Clark | Jr |
| DT | 99 | Greg Gilmore | Jr |

Special teams

| Pos. | # | Name | Class |
|---|---|---|---|
| K | 34 | Connor Culp | Fr |
| K | 35 | Jack Gonsoulin | Fr |
| P | 36 | Cameron Gamble | Jr |
| P | 38 | Josh Growden | Fr |
| K | 42 | Colby Delahoussaye | Sr |
| P | 46 | Zach Von Rosenberg | Fr |
| LS | 50 | Blake Ferguson | Fr |
| LS | 59 | John Ballis | Sr |

Head coach

- Ed Orgeron

Coordinators/assistant coaches

- Dennis Johnson – Outside linebackers

Legend

- (C) Team captain
- (S) Suspended
- (I) Ineligible
- Injured
- Redshirt

Roster

== Game summaries ==
=== Vs. Wisconsin ===
| | 1 | 2 | 3 | 4 | Total |
|---|---|---|---|---|---|
| No. 5 Tigers | 0 | 0 | 14 | 0 | 14 |
| Badgers | 0 | 6 | 7 | 3 | 16 |

| Statistics | LSU | WIS |
|---|---|---|
| First downs | 14 | 21 |
| Total yards | 257 | 339 |
| Rushing yards | 126 | 134 |
| Passing yards | 131 | 205 |
| Turnovers | 3 | 3 |
| Time of possession | 23:03 | 36:57 |

| Team | Category | Player | Statistics |
|---|---|---|---|
| LSU | Passing | Brandon Harris | 12/21, 131 yards, TD, 2 INT |
| LSU | Rushing | Leonard Fournette | 23 rushes, 138 yards |
| LSU | Receiving | Travin Dural | 5 receptions, 50 yards, TD |
| Wisconsin | Passing | Bart Houston | 19/31, 205 yards, 2 INT |
| Wisconsin | Rushing | Corey Clement | 21 rushes, 86 yards, TD |
| Wisconsin | Receiving | Troy Fumagalli | 7 receptions, 100 yards |

=== No. 5 (FCS) Jacksonville State ===
| | 1 | 2 | 3 | 4 | Total |
|---|---|---|---|---|---|
| No. 5 (FCS) Gamecocks | 0 | 10 | 0 | 3 | 13 |
| No. 21 Tigers | 0 | 27 | 7 | 0 | 34 |

| Statistics | JVST | LSU |
|---|---|---|
| First downs | 17 | 18 |
| Total yards | 368 | 371 |
| Rushing yards | 120 | 244 |
| Passing yards | 248 | 127 |
| Turnovers | 1 | 2 |
| Time of possession | 33:09 | 26:51 |

| Team | Category | Player | Statistics |
|---|---|---|---|
| Jacksonville State | Passing | Eli Jenkins | 17/35, 248 yards, TD, INT |
| Jacksonville State | Rushing | Eli Jenkins | 18 rushes, 82 yards |
| Jacksonville State | Receiving | Krenwick Sanders | 1 reception, 76 yards, TD |
| LSU | Passing | Danny Etling | 6/14, 100 yards, TD, INT |
| LSU | Rushing | Derrius Guice | 19 rushes, 155 yards, TD |
| LSU | Receiving | DeSean Smith | 1 reception, 46 yards, TD |

=== Mississippi State ===
| | 1 | 2 | 3 | 4 | Total |
|---|---|---|---|---|---|
| Bulldogs | 0 | 3 | 3 | 14 | 20 |
| No. 20 Tigers | 14 | 9 | 0 | 0 | 23 |

| Statistics | MSST | LSU |
|---|---|---|
| First downs | 14 | 22 |
| Total yards | 270 | 392 |
| Rushing yards | 56 | 177 |
| Passing yards | 214 | 215 |
| Turnovers | 1 | 1 |
| Time of possession | 27:16 | 32:44 |

| Team | Category | Player | Statistics |
|---|---|---|---|
| Mississippi State | Passing | Nick Fitzgerald | 12/24, 120 yards |
| Mississippi State | Rushing | Ashton Shumpert | 6 rushes, 34 yards |
| Mississippi State | Receiving | Fred Ross | 6 receptions, 89 yards, TD |
| LSU | Passing | Danny Etling | 19/30, 215 yards, TD |
| LSU | Rushing | Leonard Fournette | 28 rushes, 147 yards, 2 TD |
| LSU | Receiving | Malachi Dupre | 4 receptions, 54 yards |

=== At Auburn ===
| | 1 | 2 | 3 | 4 | Total |
|---|---|---|---|---|---|
| No. 18 LSU Tigers | 7 | 0 | 6 | 0 | 13 |
| AUB Tigers | 3 | 6 | 3 | 6 | 18 |

| Statistics | LSU | AUB |
|---|---|---|
| First downs | 14 | 18 |
| Total yards | 338 | 388 |
| Rushing yards | 220 | 154 |
| Passing yards | 118 | 234 |
| Turnovers | 1 | 1 |
| Time of possession | 27:49 | 32:11 |

| Team | Category | Player | Statistics |
|---|---|---|---|
| LSU | Passing | Danny Etling | 15/27, 118 yards, TD |
| LSU | Rushing | Leonard Fournette | 16 rushes, 101 yards |
| LSU | Receiving | Travin Dural | 4 receptions, 47 yards |
| Auburn | Passing | Sean White | 19/26, 234 yards |
| Auburn | Rushing | Kerryon Johnson | 22 rushes, 93 yards |
| Auburn | Receiving | Kerryon Johnson | 4 receptions, 68 yards |

=== Missouri ===
| | 1 | 2 | 3 | 4 | Total |
|---|---|---|---|---|---|
| MIZ Tigers | 0 | 0 | 0 | 7 | 7 |
| LSU Tigers | 7 | 14 | 7 | 14 | 42 |

| Statistics | MIZ | LSU |
|---|---|---|
| First downs | 14 | 30 |
| Total yards | 265 | 634 |
| Rushing yards | 77 | 418 |
| Passing yards | 188 | 216 |
| Turnovers | 1 | 0 |
| Time of possession | 17:27 | 42:33 |

| Team | Category | Player | Statistics |
|---|---|---|---|
| Missouri | Passing | Drew Lock | 17/37, 167 yards, INT |
| Missouri | Rushing | Ish Witter | 11 rushes, 48 yards |
| Missouri | Receiving | Johnathon Johnson | 3 receptions, 42 yards |
| LSU | Passing | Danny Etling | 19/30, 216 yards |
| LSU | Rushing | Derrius Guice | 17 rushes, 163 yards, 3 TD |
| LSU | Receiving | D. J. Chark | 3 receptions, 58 yards |

=== Southern Miss ===
| | 1 | 2 | 3 | 4 | Total |
|---|---|---|---|---|---|
| Golden Eagles | 7 | 3 | 0 | 0 | 10 |
| Tigers | 7 | 3 | 28 | 7 | 45 |

| Statistics | USM | LSU |
|---|---|---|
| First downs | 16 | 17 |
| Total yards | 242 | 459 |
| Rushing yards | 81 | 183 |
| Passing yards | 161 | 276 |
| Turnovers | 1 | 1 |
| Time of possession | 37:59 | 22:01 |

| Team | Category | Player | Statistics |
|---|---|---|---|
| Southern Miss | Passing | Nick Mullens | 25/36, 161 yards |
| Southern Miss | Rushing | Ito Smith | 16 rushes, 64 yards, TD |
| Southern Miss | Receiving | Ito Smith | 6 receptions, 46 yards |
| LSU | Passing | Danny Etling | 11/18, 276 yards, 3 TD, INT |
| LSU | Rushing | Derrius Guice | 16 rushes, 162 yards, 2 TD |
| LSU | Receiving | Malachi Dupre | 3 receptions, 100 yards, 2 TD |

=== No. 23 Ole Miss ===
| | 1 | 2 | 3 | 4 | Total |
|---|---|---|---|---|---|
| No. 23 Rebels | 10 | 11 | 0 | 0 | 21 |
| No. 25 Tigers | 7 | 14 | 10 | 7 | 38 |

| Statistics | MISS | LSU |
|---|---|---|
| First downs | 19 | 20 |
| Total yards | 325 | 515 |
| Rushing yards | 107 | 311 |
| Passing yards | 218 | 204 |
| Turnovers | 2 | 3 |
| Time of possession | 27:47 | 32:13 |

| Team | Category | Player | Statistics |
|---|---|---|---|
| Ole Miss | Passing | Chad Kelly | 20/33, 218 yards, TD, 2 INT |
| Ole Miss | Rushing | Chad Kelly | 12 rushes, 56 yards |
| Ole Miss | Receiving | Damore'ea Stringfellow | 4 receptions, 92 yards |
| LSU | Passing | Danny Etling | 19/28, 204 yards, TD, INT |
| LSU | Rushing | Leonard Fournette | 16 rushes, 284 yards, 3 TD |
| LSU | Receiving | Malachi Dupre | 5 receptions, 52 yards |

=== No. 1 Alabama ===
| | 1 | 2 | 3 | 4 | Total |
|---|---|---|---|---|---|
| No. 1 Crimson Tide | 0 | 0 | 0 | 10 | 10 |
| No. 13 Tigers | 0 | 0 | 0 | 0 | 0 |

| Statistics | ALA | LSU |
|---|---|---|
| First downs | 16 | 6 |
| Total yards | 323 | 125 |
| Rushing yards | 216 | 33 |
| Passing yards | 107 | 92 |
| Turnovers | 2 | 1 |
| Time of possession | 33:55 | 26:05 |

| Team | Category | Player | Statistics |
|---|---|---|---|
| Alabama | Passing | Jalen Hurts | 10/19, 107 yards, INT |
| Alabama | Rushing | Jalen Hurts | 20 rushes, 114 yards, TD |
| Alabama | Receiving | ArDarius Stewart | 3 receptions, 55 yards |
| LSU | Passing | Danny Etling | 11/24, 92 yards, INT |
| LSU | Rushing | Leonard Fournette | 17 rushes, 35 yards |
| LSU | Receiving | D. J. Chark | 3 receptions, 45 yards |

=== At No. 25 Arkansas ===
| | 1 | 2 | 3 | 4 | Total |
|---|---|---|---|---|---|
| No. 24 Tigers | 7 | 14 | 7 | 10 | 38 |
| No. 25 Razorbacks | 0 | 7 | 3 | 0 | 10 |

| Statistics | LSU | ARK |
|---|---|---|
| First downs | 23 | 13 |
| Total yards | 547 | 291 |
| Rushing yards | 390 | 81 |
| Passing yards | 157 | 210 |
| Turnovers | 2 | 3 |
| Time of possession | 35:11 | 24:49 |

| Team | Category | Player | Statistics |
|---|---|---|---|
| LSU | Passing | Danny Etling | 10/16, 157 yards |
| LSU | Rushing | Derrius Guice | 21 rushes, 252 yards, 2 TD |
| LSU | Receiving | Malachi Dupre | 2 receptions, 60 yards |
| Arkansas | Passing | Austin Allen | 15/31, 210 yards, TD, 2 INT |
| Arkansas | Rushing | Devwah Whaley | 7 rushes, 52 yards |
| Arkansas | Receiving | Dominique Reed | 2 receptions, 58 yards, TD |

=== No. 23 Florida ===
| | 1 | 2 | 3 | 4 | Total |
|---|---|---|---|---|---|
| No. 23 Gators | 0 | 3 | 7 | 6 | 16 |
| No. 16 Tigers | 7 | 0 | 0 | 3 | 10 |

| Statistics | FLA | LSU |
|---|---|---|
| First downs | 14 | 23 |
| Total yards | 270 | 423 |
| Rushing yards | 126 | 219 |
| Passing yards | 144 | 204 |
| Turnovers | 0 | 2 |
| Time of possession | 25:58 | 34:02 |

| Team | Category | Player | Statistics |
|---|---|---|---|
| Florida | Passing | Austin Appleby | 7/17, 144 yards, TD |
| Florida | Rushing | Jordan Scarlett | 22 rushes, 108 yards |
| Florida | Receiving | Tyrie Cleveland | 3 receptions, 124 yards, TD |
| LSU | Passing | Danny Etling | 14/25, 204 yards |
| LSU | Rushing | Derrius Guice | 19 rushes, 83 yards, TD |
| LSU | Receiving | D. J. Chark | 2 receptions, 46 yards |

=== At Texas A&M ===
| | 1 | 2 | 3 | 4 | Total |
|---|---|---|---|---|---|
| Tigers | 10 | 10 | 14 | 20 | 54 |
| Aggies | 7 | 0 | 10 | 22 | 39 |

| Statistics | LSU | TAMU |
|---|---|---|
| First downs | 28 | 19 |
| Total yards | 622 | 472 |
| Rushing yards | 298 | 188 |
| Passing yards | 324 | 284 |
| Turnovers | 0 | 1 |
| Time of possession | 35:26 | 24:34 |

| Team | Category | Player | Statistics |
|---|---|---|---|
| LSU | Passing | Danny Etling | 20/28, 324 yards, 2 TD |
| LSU | Rushing | Derrius Guice | 37 rushes, 285 yards, 4 TD |
| LSU | Receiving | Russell Gage | 5 receptions, 62 yards, TD |
| Texas A&M | Passing | Trevor Knight | 14/30, 211 yards, 3 TD |
| Texas A&M | Rushing | Keith Ford | 15 rushes, 100 yards |
| Texas A&M | Receiving | Christian Kirk | 8 receptions, 107 yards, 2 TD |

=== Vs. No. 13 Louisville (Citrus Bowl) ===
| | 1 | 2 | 3 | 4 | Total |
|---|---|---|---|---|---|
| No. 20 Tigers | 0 | 16 | 10 | 3 | 29 |
| No. 13 Cardinals | 3 | 3 | 0 | 3 | 9 |

| Statistics | LSU | LOU |
|---|---|---|
| First downs | 20 | 11 |
| Total yards | 394 | 220 |
| Rushing yards | 177 | 67 |
| Passing yards | 217 | 153 |
| Turnovers | 1 | 1 |
| Time of possession | 35:38 | 24:22 |

| Team | Category | Player | Statistics |
|---|---|---|---|
| LSU | Passing | Danny Etling | 16/29, 217 yards, 2 TD, INT |
| LSU | Rushing | Derrius Guice | 26 rushes, 138 yards, TD |
| LSU | Receiving | Malachi Dupre | 7 receptions, 139 yards |
| Louisville | Passing | Lamar Jackson | 10/27, 153 yards |
| Louisville | Rushing | Lamar Jackson | 26 rushes, 33 yards |
| Louisville | Receiving | James Quick | 3 receptions, 81 yards |
