= 2012 LSU Tigers football team =

American college football season

2012 LSU Tigers football

Chick-fil-A Bowl, L 24–25 vs. Clemson
- Conference: Southeastern Conference
- Western Division

Ranking
- Coaches: No. 12
- AP: No. 14
- Record: 0–3, 10 wins vacated (0–2 SEC, 6 wins vacated)
- Head coach: Les Miles (8th season)
- Offensive coordinator: Greg Studrawa (2nd season)
- Offensive scheme: Multiple
- Defensive coordinator: John Chavis (4th season)
- Base defense: 4–3
- Home stadium: Tiger Stadium

2012 Southeastern Conference football standings
	Conf.			Overall
Team	W		L	W		L
Eastern Division
No. T–5 Georgia xy	7	–	1	12	–	2
No. 9 Florida x%	7	–	1	11	–	2
No. 8 South Carolina	6	–	2	11	–	2
No. 23 Vanderbilt	5	–	3	9	–	4
Missouri	2	–	6	5	–	7
Tennessee	1	–	7	5	–	7
Kentucky	0	–	8	2	–	10
Western Division
No. 1 Alabama x$#	7	–	1	13	–	1
No. 14 LSU *	6	–	2	10	–	3
No. T–5 Texas A&M	6	–	2	11	–	2
Mississippi State	4	–	4	8	–	5
Ole Miss *	3	–	5	7	–	6
Arkansas	2	–	6	4	–	8
Auburn	0	–	8	3	–	9
Championship: Alabama 32, Georgia 28
# – BCS National Champion; $ – BCS representative as conference champion; % – BCS at-large representative; x – Division champion/co-champions; y – Championship game participant; * Ole Miss and LSU vacated all wins due to NCAA violations.; Rankings from AP Poll

The 2012 LSU Tigers football team represented Louisiana State University as a member of the Western Division of the Southeastern Conference (SEC) during the 2012 NCAA Division I FBS football season. Led by eighth-year head coach Les Miles, the Tigers finished the season with an overall record of 10–3 and mark of 6–2 in conference play, tying for second place in the SEC's Western Division. LSU was invited to the Chick-fil-A Bowl, where the Tigers lost to Clemson. They played home games Tiger Stadium in Baton Rouge, Louisiana.

In 2023, the National Collegiate Athletic Association (NCAA) vacated all of LSU's wins from the 2012 through 2015 seasons due to an ineligible player.

== Recruits ==
College recruiting
Name	Hometown	School	Height	Weight	40^{‡}	Commit date
Kwon Alexander; OLB	Oxford, AL	Oxford HS	6 ft 2 in (1.88 m)	215 lb (98 kg)	4.5	Feb 1, 2012
Kwon Alexander; OLB	Recruit ratings: Scout: Rivals: (83)					
Vadal Alexander; OG	Buford, GA	Buford HS	6 ft 6 in (1.98 m)	310 lb (140 kg)	N/A	Oct 10, 2011
Vadal Alexander; OG	Recruit ratings: Scout: Rivals: (81)					
Travin Dural; WR	Breaux Bridge, LA	Breaux Bridge HS	6 ft 1 in (1.85 m)	175 lb (79 kg)	4.5	Apr 5, 2011
Travin Dural; WR	Recruit ratings: Scout: Rivals: (78)					
Derek Edinburgh; OT	New Orleans, LA	Edna Karr HS	6 ft 8 in (2.03 m)	337 lb (153 kg)	N/A	Jul 19, 2011
Derek Edinburgh; OT	Recruit ratings: Scout: Rivals: (78)					
Ronnie Feist; OLB	Edgard, LA	West Saint John HS	6 ft 1 in (1.85 m)	215 lb (98 kg)	4.6	Feb 5, 2011
Ronnie Feist; OLB	Recruit ratings: Scout: Rivals: (78)					
Reid Ferguson; LS	Buford, GA	Buford HS	6 ft 2 in (1.88 m)	235 lb (107 kg)	N/A	Jun 20, 2011
Reid Ferguson; LS	Recruit ratings: Scout: Rivals: (73)					
Dillon Gordon; TE	River Ridge, LA	John Curtis Christian HS	6 ft 5 in (1.96 m)	245 lb (111 kg)	N/A	Feb 5, 2011
Dillon Gordon; TE	Recruit ratings: Scout: Rivals: (78)					
Trey Granier; ILB	Thibodaux, LA	Thibodaux HS	6 ft 1 in (1.85 m)	225 lb (102 kg)	4.6	Nov 11, 2010
Trey Granier; ILB	Recruit ratings: Scout: Rivals: (75)					
Jerald Hawkins; DE	Baldwin, LA	West Saint Mary HS	6 ft 7 in (2.01 m)	285 lb (129 kg)	N/A	May 28, 2011
Jerald Hawkins; DE	Recruit ratings: Scout: Rivals: (78)					
Jeremy Hill; RB	Baton Rouge, LA	Redemptorist HS	6 ft 1 in (1.85 m)	225 lb (102 kg)	4.6	Jan 18, 2012
Jeremy Hill; RB	Recruit ratings: Scout: Rivals: (LQ)					
Kavahra Holmes; WR	Breaux Bridge, LA	Breaux Bridge HS	6 ft 1 in (1.85 m)	180 lb (82 kg)	4.4	Jun 7, 2011
Kavahra Holmes; WR	Recruit ratings: Scout: Rivals: (76)					
Danielle Hunter; DE	Katy, TX	Morton Ranch HS	6 ft 5 in (1.96 m)	235 lb (107 kg)	4.6	Jul 20, 2011
Danielle Hunter; DE	Recruit ratings: Scout: Rivals: (79)					
Avery Johnson; WR	Pompano Beach, FL	Ely HS	6 ft 2 in (1.88 m)	180 lb (82 kg)	N/A	Sep 1, 2010
Avery Johnson; WR	Recruit ratings: Scout: Rivals: (80)					
Deion Jones; ILB	New Orleans, LA	Jesuit HS	6 ft 2 in (1.88 m)	200 lb (91 kg)	4.4	Dec 2, 2011
Deion Jones; ILB	Recruit ratings: Scout: Rivals: (78)					
Jeremy Liggins; QB	Oxford, MS	Lafayette HS	6 ft 3 in (1.91 m)	270 lb (120 kg)	N/A	Jan 30, 2012
Jeremy Liggins; QB	Recruit ratings: Scout: Rivals: (80)					
Lamar Louis; ATH	Breaux Bridge, LA	Breaux Bridge HS	6 ft 0 in (1.83 m)	220 lb (100 kg)	4.5	Apr 5, 2011
Lamar Louis; ATH	Recruit ratings: Scout: Rivals: (80)					
Jalen Mills; CB	DeSoto, TX	DeSoto HS	6 ft 0 in (1.83 m)	180 lb (82 kg)	4.5	Jul 20, 2011
Jalen Mills; CB	Recruit ratings: Scout: Rivals: (73)					
Lorenzo Phillips; OLB	Patterson, LA	Patterson HS	6 ft 1 in (1.85 m)	200 lb (91 kg)	N/A	Jan 21, 2012
Lorenzo Phillips; OLB	Recruit ratings: Scout: Rivals: (80)					
Derrick Raymond; S	Metairie, LA	East Jefferson HS	6 ft 2 in (1.88 m)	175 lb (79 kg)	4.4	May 28, 2011
Derrick Raymond; S	Recruit ratings: Scout: Rivals: (76)					
Jerquinick Sandolph; CB	Boutte, LA	Hahnville HS	6 ft 1 in (1.85 m)	180 lb (82 kg)	4.5	May 28, 2011
Jerquinick Sandolph; CB	Recruit ratings: Scout: Rivals: (77)					
John Thomas; TE	Bossier City, LA	Airline HS	6 ft 5 in (1.96 m)	245 lb (111 kg)	N/A	Mar 30, 2011
John Thomas; TE	Recruit ratings: Scout: Rivals: (79)					
Dwayne Thomas; CB	New Orleans, LA	O. Perry Walker HS	6 ft 1 in (1.85 m)	170 lb (77 kg)	N/A	Apr 9, 2011
Dwayne Thomas; CB	Recruit ratings: Scout: Rivals: (78)					
Corey Thompson; S	Missouri City, TX	Lawrence E. Elkins HS	6 ft 2 in (1.88 m)	205 lb (93 kg)	4.55	Jan 30, 2012
Corey Thompson; S	Recruit ratings: Scout: Rivals: (78)					
Overall recruit ranking: Scout: 6 Rivals: 18
‡ Refers to 40-yard dash; Note: In many cases, Scout, Rivals, 247Sports, On3, and ESPN may conflict in their listings of height, weight and 40 time.; In these cases, the average was taken. ESPN grades are on a 100-point scale.; Sources: "LSU 2012 Football Commitments". Rivals.; "2012 Player Commitments - LSU". ESPN.; "2012 Team Ranking". Rivals.com.

== Schedule ==
Date	Time	Opponent	Rank	Site	TV	Result	Attendance
September 1	6:00 p.m.	North Texas*	No. 3	Tiger Stadium; Baton Rouge, LA	ESPNU	W 41–14 (vacated)	92,059
September 8	6:00 p.m.	Washington*	No. 3	Tiger Stadium; Baton Rouge, LA	ESPN	W 41–3 (vacated)	92,804
September 15	7:00 p.m.	Idaho*	No. 3	Tiger Stadium; Baton Rouge, LA	TigerVision PPV	W 63–14 (vacated)	92,177
September 22	6:00 p.m.	at Auburn	No. 2	Jordan–Hare Stadium; Auburn, AL (Tiger Bowl)	ESPN	W 12–10 (vacated)	86,721
September 29	6:00 p.m.	Towson*	No. 3	Tiger Stadium; Baton Rouge, LA	ESPNU	W 38–22 (vacated)	92,154
October 6	2:30 p.m.	at No. 10 Florida	No. 4	Ben Hill Griffin Stadium; Gainesville, FL (rivalry)	CBS	L 6–14	90,824
October 13	7:00 p.m.	No. 3 South Carolina	No. 9	Tiger Stadium; Baton Rouge, LA	ESPN	W 23–21 (vacated)	92,734
October 20	11:00 a.m.	at No. 20 Texas A&M	No. 6	Kyle Field; College Station, TX (rivalry)	ESPN	W 24–19 (vacated)	87,429
November 3	7:00 p.m.	No. 1 Alabama	No. 5	Tiger Stadium; Baton Rouge, LA (rivalry) (College GameDay)	CBS	L 17–21	93,374
November 10	6:00 p.m.	No. 22 Mississippi State^{†}	No. 9	Tiger Stadium; Baton Rouge, LA (rivalry)	ESPN	W 37–17 (vacated)	92,831
November 17	2:30 p.m.	Ole Miss	No. 8	Tiger Stadium; Baton Rouge, LA (Magnolia Bowl)	CBS	W 41–35 (vacated)	92,872
November 23	1:30 p.m.	at Arkansas	No. 8	Donald W. Reynolds Razorback Stadium; Fayetteville, AR (Battle for the Golden Boot)	CBS	W 20–13 (vacated)	71,117
December 31	6:30 p.m.	vs. No. 15 Clemson*	No. 9	Georgia Dome; Atlanta, GA (Chick-fil-A Bowl)	ESPN	L 24–25	68,027
*Non-conference game; ^{†}Homecoming; Rankings from AP Poll released prior to the game; All times are in Central time

== Personnel ==
=== Coaching staff ===
Name	Position	Seasons at LSU	Alma mater
Les Miles	Head coach	8	Michigan (1976)
John Chavis	Defensive coordinator	4	Tennessee (1979)
Greg Studrawa	Offensive coordinator, Offensive Line Coach	6	Bowling Green (1987)
Steve Kragthorpe	Quarterbacks	2	Jacksonville State (1983)
Frank Wilson	Running backs, Recruiting Coordinator	3	Nicholls State (1997)
Corey Raymond	Defensive backs	1	LSU (1992)
Steve Ensminger	Tight ends	3	LSU (1982)
Adam Henry	Wide receivers, Passing Game Coordinator	1	McNeese State (1993)
Brick Haley	Defensive line	4	Alabama A&M (1989)
Thomas McGaughey	Special teams	2	Houston (1995)

=== Roster ===
2012 LSU Tigers football team roster
Players
Coaches
Offense

Pos.	#	Name	Class
WR		Odell Beckham Jr.
RB		Alfred Blue
RB		Jeremy Hill
QB		Brad Kragthorpe	Fr
WR		Jarvis Landry
QB		Zach Mettenberger
RB		Spencer Ware

Defense

Pos.	#	Name	Class
DT		Bennie Logan
DE		Barkevious Mingo
S		Eric Reid

Special teams

Pos.	#	Name	Class
P		Brad Wing

Head coach

- Les Miles

Coordinators/assistant coaches

Legend

- (C) Team captain
- (S) Suspended
- (I) Ineligible
- Injured
- Redshirt

== Rankings ==
Ranking movements Legend: ██ Increase in ranking ██ Decrease in ranking ( ) = First-place votes
	Week															
Poll	Pre	1	2	3	4	5	6	7	8	9	10	11	12	13	14	Final
AP	3 (16)	3 (4)	3 (4)	2 (2)	3 (1)	4	9	6	6	5	9	8	8	9	9	14
Coaches	1 (18)	3 (7)	2 (5)	2 (5)	3 (1)	3 (1)	8	6	6	5	9	8	7	6	7	12
Harris	Not released						8	6	6	5	8	8	8	7	8	Not released
BCS	Not released							6	6	5	7	7	7	7	8	Not released
