= 2016 Citrus Bowl (December) =

American college football game

2016 Buffalo Wild Wings Citrus Bowl
- 71st Citrus Bowl
LSU Tigers	Louisville Cardinals
(7–4)	(9–3)
SEC	ACC
29	9
Head coach: Ed Orgeron	Head coach: Bobby Petrino
AP / Coaches / CFP; 19 / 20 / 20	AP / Coaches / CFP; 15 / 15 / 13
	1	2	3	4	Total
LSU	0	16	10	3	29
Louisville	3	3	0	3	9
- Date: December 31, 2016
- Season: 2016
- Stadium: Camping World Stadium
- Location: Orlando, Florida
- MVP: Derrius Guice, LSU
- Favorite: LSU by 3.5
- Referee: Mark Duddy (Pac-12)
- Attendance: 46,063
- Payout: US$4,250,000

United States TV coverage
- Network: ABC
- Announcers: Dave Pasch (play-by-play); Greg McElroy (color); Tom Luginbill (sidelines)

The 2016 Citrus Bowl (December) was an American college football bowl game played on December 31, 2016, at the Camping World Stadium in Orlando, Florida. The 71st edition of the Citrus Bowl, it was one of the 2016–17 NCAA football bowl games concluding the 2016 NCAA Division I FBS football season. The game was nationally televised by ABC. It was sponsored by the Buffalo Wild Wings restaurant franchise and was officially titled the Buffalo Wild Wings Citrus Bowl.

== Teams ==
Teams were selected from the SEC and the ACC. The matchup was announced on December 4, 2016. LSU was chosen from the SEC and Louisville was chosen from the ACC.

== Game summary ==
=== Scoring summary ===
Scoring summary

Quarter	Time	Drive			Team	Scoring information	Score	
Quarter	Time	Plays	Yards	TOP	Team	Scoring information	LSU	UL
1	7:14	5	55	1:11	UL	24-yard field goal by Blanton Creque	0	3
2	14:54	7	52	3:41	LSU	Colin Heter 1-yard touchdown reception from Danny Etling, Colby Delahoussaye kick good	7	3
2	7:14	13	79	5:45	LSU	Derrius Guice 1-yard touchdown reception from Danny Etling, Colby Delahoussaye kick good	14	3
2	1:08				LSU	Lamar Jackson tackled in end zone for a safety by Arden Key	16	3
2	0:00	4	3	0:54	UL	47-yard field goal by Blanton Creque	16	6
3	8:48	2	82	0:45	LSU	Derrius Guice 70-yard touchdown run, Colby Delahoussaye kick good	23	6
3	3:04	8	35	4:18	LSU	42-yard field goal by Colby Delahoussaye	26	6
4	14:43	12	56	3:21	UL	30-yard field goal by Blanton Creque	26	9
4	10:38	8	41	4:05	LSU	25-yard field goal by Colby Delahoussaye	29	9
"TOP" = time of possession. For other American football terms, see Glossary of American football.							29	9

=== Statistics ===
Statistics	LSU	UL
First downs	20	11
Plays-yards	70–394	62–220
Third down efficiency	7–17	2–17
Rushes-yards	41–177	35–67
Passing yards	217	153
Passing, Comp-Att-Int	16–29–1	10–27–0
Time of Possession	35:38	24:22
"Source":

Team	Category	Player	Statistics
LSU	Passing	Danny Etling	16/29, 217 yds, 2 TD 1 INT
LSU	Rushing	Derrius Guice	26 car, 138 yds, 1 TD
LSU	Receiving	Malachi Dupre	7 rec, 139 yds
UL	Passing	Lamar Jackson	10/27, 153 yds
UL	Rushing	Lamar Jackson	26 car, 33 yds
UL	Receiving	James Quick	3 rec, 81 yds
"Source":
