= 2015 Texas Bowl =

2015 AdvoCare V100 Texas Bowl
- LSU's win was vacated by the NCAA in 2023.
LSU Tigers	Texas Tech Red Raiders
(8–3)	(7–5)
SEC	Big 12
56	27
Head coach: Les Miles	Head coach: Kliff Kingsbury
AP / Coaches / CFP; 22 / 21 / 20
	1	2	3	4	Total
LSU	14	7	21	14	56
Texas Tech	6	7	7	7	27
- Date: December 29, 2015
- Season: 2015
- Stadium: NRG Stadium
- Location: Houston, Texas
- MVP: LSU RB Leonard Fournette
- Favorite: LSU by 7
- National anthem: Cody Johnson
- Referee: Land Clark (Pac-12)
- Attendance: 71,307

United States TV coverage
- Network: ESPN/ESPN Radio
- Announcers: Joe Tessitore, Jesse Palmer, David Pollack, & Maria Taylor (ESPN); Bob Wischusen, Brock Huard, & Shannon Spake (ESPN Radio)

The 2015 Texas Bowl was an American college football bowl game played on December 29, 2015, at NRG Stadium in Houston, Texas. It was one of the 2015–16 bowl games that concludes the 2015 FBS football season. The tenth edition of the Texas Bowl, it featured the LSU Tigers of the Southeastern Conference against the Texas Tech Red Raiders of the Big 12 Conference. The game began at 8:00 p.m. CST and was aired on ESPN. Sponsored by the AdvoCare nutrition and sports performance company, it was officially known as the AdvoCare V100 Texas Bowl.

In 2023, this win was vacated due to an ineligible starter for LSU.

== Game summary ==
=== Scoring summary ===
Scoring summary

Quarter	Time	Drive			Team	Scoring information	Score	
Quarter	Time	Plays	Yards	TOP	Team	Scoring information	LSU	TTU
1	11:47	6	66	1:58	LSU	Leonard Fournette 2-yard touchdown run, Trent Domingue kick good	7	0
1	0:53	9	90	4:23	TTU	Jakeem Grant 46-yard touchdown reception from Patrick Mahomes II, 2-point pass incomplete	7	6
1	0:29	1	79	0:24	LSU	D. J. Chark 79-yard touchdown run, Trent Domingue kick good	14	6
2	6:41	2	42	1:16	LSU	Leonard Fournette 44-yard touchdown reception from Brandon Harris, Trent Domingue kick good	21	6
2	3:38	9	90	3:03	TTU	Jakeem Grant 3-yard touchdown reception from Patrick Mahomes II, Clayton Hatfield kick good	21	13
3	10:28	3	31	0:19	TTU	Reginald Davis III 31-yard touchdown reception from Patrick Mahomes II, Clayton Hatfield kick good	21	20
3	8:17	4	75	2:11	LSU	Leonard Fournette 43-yard touchdown run, Trent Domingue kick good	28	20
3	4:07	4	78	1:13	LSU	Leonard Fournette 4-yard touchdown run, Trent Domingue kick good	35	20
3	0:09	4	64	1:54	LSU	Brandon Harris 26-yard touchdown run, Trent Domingue kick good	42	20
4	12:20	8	61	2:49	TTU	Jakeem Grant 4-yard touchdown reception from Patrick Mahomes II, Clayton Hatfield kick good	42	27
4	8:16	9	65	4:04	LSU	Leonard Fournette 2-yard touchdown run, Trent Domingue kick good	49	27
4	4:24	6	65	3:20	LSU	Darrel Williams 2-yard touchdown run, Trent Domingue kick good	56	27
"TOP" = time of possession. For other American football terms, see Glossary of American football.							56†	27

† LSU's victory was vacated in 2023.

=== Statistics ===
Statistics	LSU	TTU
First downs	23	22
Total offense, plays – yards	62–638	82–399
Rushes-yards (net)	40–384	26–29
Passing yards (net)	254	370
Passes, Comp-Att-Int	13–22–1	28–56–1
Time of Possession	30:14	29:46
