= Jalen Mills =

American football player (born 1994)

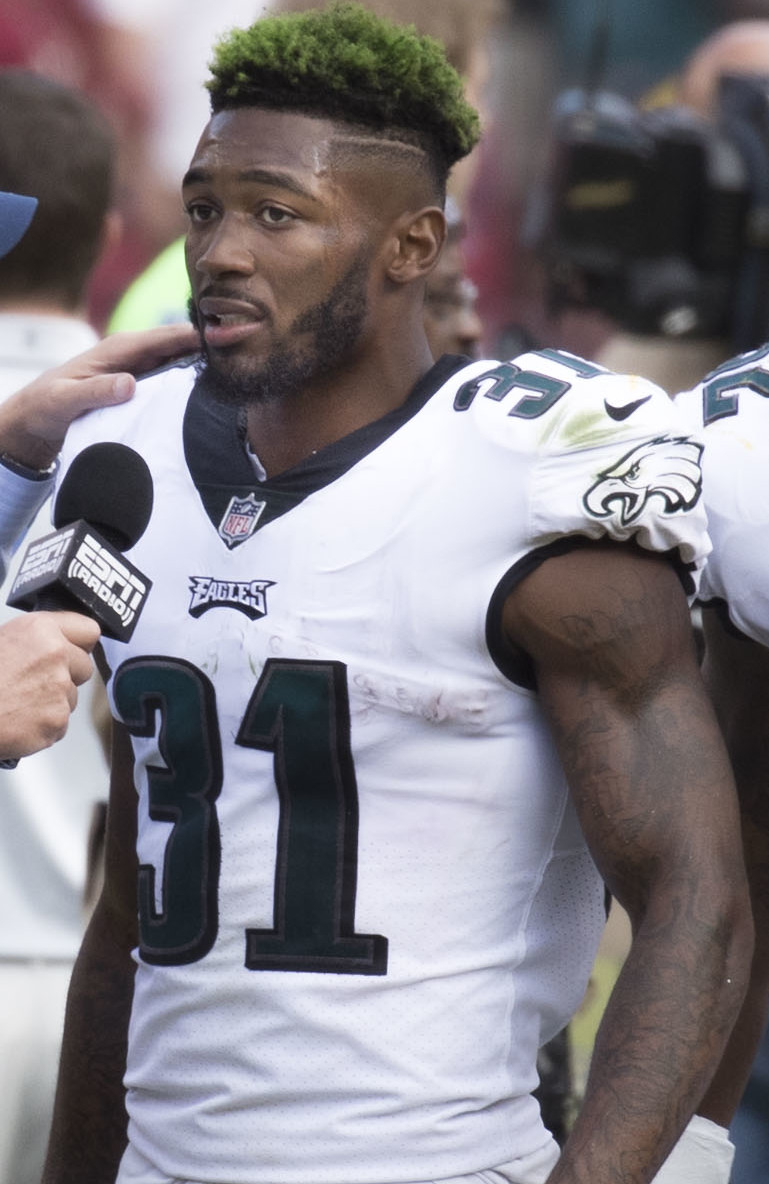
- Mills with the Philadelphia Eagles in 2017

Profile
- Position: Safety

Personal information
- Born: April 6, 1994 (age 32); Dallas, Texas, U.S.
- Listed height: 6 ft 0 in (1.83 m)
- Listed weight: 200 lb (91 kg)

Career information
- High school: DeSoto (DeSoto, Texas)
- College: LSU (2012–2015)
- NFL draft: 2016: 7th round, 233rd overall pick

Career history
- Philadelphia Eagles (2016–2020); New England Patriots (2021–2023); New York Giants (2024)*; New York Jets (2024); Houston Texans (2025); Detroit Lions (2025–2026)
- * Offseason or practice squad member only

Awards and highlights
- Super Bowl champion (LII); First-team All-American (2015); Freshman All-American (2012)

Career NFL statistics as of 2026
- Total tackles: 463
- Sacks: 1.5
- Forced fumbles: 3
- Fumble recoveries: 1
- Pass deflections: 60
- Interceptions: 8
- Defensive touchdowns: 1
- Stats at Pro Football Reference

Jalen Mills (born April 6, 1994) is an American professional football safety. He played college football for the LSU Tigers, earning first-team All-American honors. Mills was selected by the Philadelphia Eagles in the seventh round of 2016 NFL draft. He was a member of the Eagles for five seasons, winning a Super Bowl title in Super Bowl LII.

== Early life ==
Mills attended Lancaster High School in Lancaster, before transferring to DeSoto High School in DeSoto, Texas, for his senior year. In 2011, Mills registered 26 tackles, one interception, and six pass breakups, helping the DeSoto Eagles to a 10–2 record and a second-round UIL 5A Division 1 playoff appearance, where they lost 41–31 to Dallas Skyline. Mills was rated by Rivals.com as a three-star recruit and committed to Louisiana State University (LSU) to play college football under head coach Les Miles.

== College career ==
Mills started all 13 games at cornerback his true freshman year at LSU in 2012, recording 57 tackles and two interceptions. As sophomore in 2013, he again started all 13 games, recording 67 tackles, three interceptions, and three sacks. As a junior in 2014, he started 12 games at safety and one at cornerback. He finished the season with 62 tackles and one interception. As a senior in 2015, Mills missed the first six games due to injury. Despite the missed time, he was named a 2015 All-American by CBS Sports.

== Professional career ==
=== Pre-draft ===
Coming out of LSU, Mills draft projection varied as NFL draft experts and scouts were split. NFL analyst Mel Kiper, CBS Sports, and other draft analysts projected him to be selected as early as the second or third round, while others projected a sixth or seventh round selection. Although he was thought as a top draft pick during his junior year, his stock fell when he suffered a fractured fibula and tore ligaments in his ankle in August 2015. He received an invitation to the NFL Combine and completed all of the required combine drills. His 40-yard dash time was mediocre and tied for 33rd among all defensive back prospects. On March 14, 2016, he participated at LSU's pro day and opted to have another attempt at the 40, 20, and 10-yard dash. Mills raised his draft stock after lowering his 40-yard dash time (4.48), but wasn't able to greatly change his combine numbers in the 20 and 10-yard dash. All 32 NFL teams were represented by coaches and scouts to watch Mills, Deion Jones, Vadal Alexander, Lamar Louis, Jerald Hawkins, Quentin Thomas, Reid Ferguson, and five others perform drills at LSU's pro day. He was ranked the eighth best cornerback prospect by Sports Illustrated and the ninth best cornerback by NFLDraftScout.com.

Pre-draft measurables
Height	Weight	Arm length	Hand span	40-yard dash	10-yard split	20-yard split	20-yard shuttle	Three-cone drill	Vertical jump	Broad jump	Bench press
6 ft 0 in (1.83 m)	191 lb (87 kg)	31 1/8 in (0.79 m)	9 1/8 in (0.23 m)	4.48 s	1.58 s	2.61 s	4.00 s	6.86 s	37 in (0.94 m)	10 ft 3 in (3.12 m)	16 reps
All values from NFL Combine/Pro Day

=== Philadelphia Eagles ===
==== 2016 ====
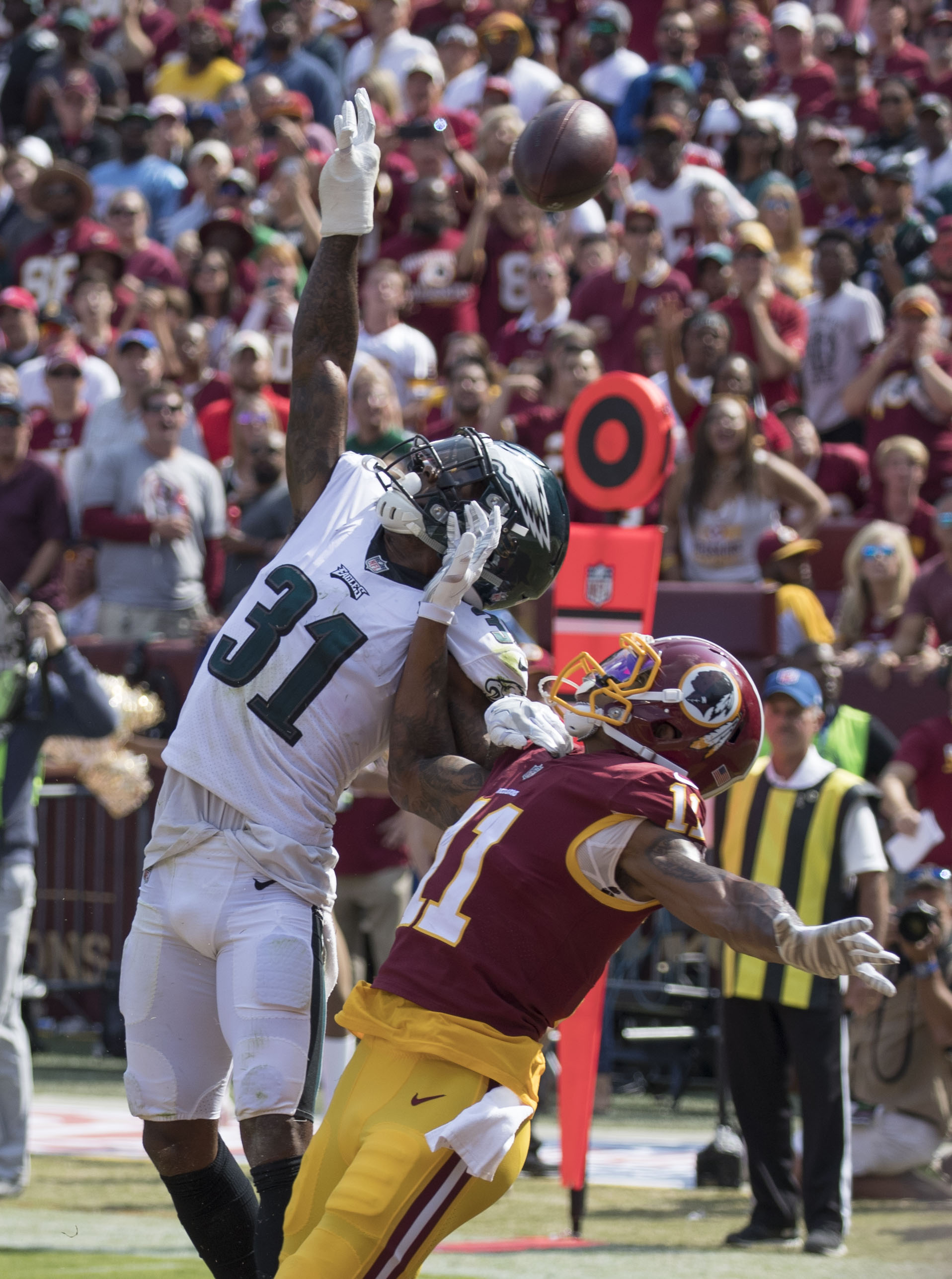
Mills deflects a pass vs Redskins week 1, 2017

The Philadelphia Eagles selected Mills in the seventh round (233rd overall) of the 2016 NFL draft. On May 4, 2016, the Eagles signed Mills to a four-year, $2.41 million contract that included a signing bonus of $75,856.

He competed with Eric Rowe, Ron Brooks, Denzel Rice, and Aaron Grymes for a backup cornerback job throughout training camp. Head coach Doug Pederson named Mills the fourth cornerback on the Eagles' depth chart to begin the regular season, behind Nolan Carroll, Leodis McKelvin, and Ron Brooks.

On September 11, 2016, Mills made his professional regular season debut in the Eagles' season-opener against the Cleveland Browns and he recorded two solo tackles in the 29–10 victory. The following week, Mills collected a season-high six solo tackles and defended a pass during a 29–14 win over the Chicago Bears. On October 16, 2016, he earned his first career start and recorded a season-high seven combined tackles and two pass deflections during a 20–27 loss to the Washington Redskins. Overall, he played in all 16 games with two starts as a rookie, recording 61 combined tackles (51 solo) and seven passes defensed.

==== 2017 ====
He competed with Patrick Robinson, Ron Brooks, Ronald Darby, Aaron Grymes, and Rasul Douglas for one of the vacant starting cornerback jobs left by the departures of Nolan Carroll and Leodis McKelvin. Mills was named a starting cornerback along with Ronald Darby and Patrick Robinson to begin the regular season.

On September 10, 2017, Mills recorded nine combined tackles, two pass deflections, and made his first career interception off of a pass attempt by Kirk Cousins during a 30–17 win against the Redskins in the Eagles' season-opener. He made the interception in the end-zone and returned it for 15 yards. In a Week 3 matchup against the New York Giants, Mills recorded a season-high 12 combined tackles and deflected two passes in a 27–24 victory. On October 12, 2017, in Week 6, Mills collected four combined tackles, deflected a pass, and intercepted a pass attempt from Cam Newton in a 28–23 win over the Carolina Panthers on Thursday Night Football.

On October 29, 2017, in Week 8 against the San Francisco 49ers, Mills recorded three combined tackles, a deflected pass, a tackle for a loss, and intercepted a pass attempt that he returned for a touchdown. For this, he was named National Football Conference (NFC) Defensive Player of the Week.

On January 21, 2018, in the NFC Championship Mills has 3 tackles, one pass deflection and only gave up two passes for 27 yards in the Eagles' 38–7 rout of the Minnesota Vikings. Mills appeared in his first career Super Bowl and the Eagles' third appearance in franchise history, which they would later win against the New England Patriots, 41–33.

==== 2018 ====
Mills entered the 2018 season as a starting cornerback for the Eagles. He started the first eight games before suffering a foot injury in Week 8. He missed the next four games before being placed on injured reserve on December 8, 2018.

==== 2019 ====
Mills was placed on the reserve/physically unable to perform (PUP) list on August 31, 2019, due to the foot injury suffered last season. He was activated from the PUP list on October 19, 2019.

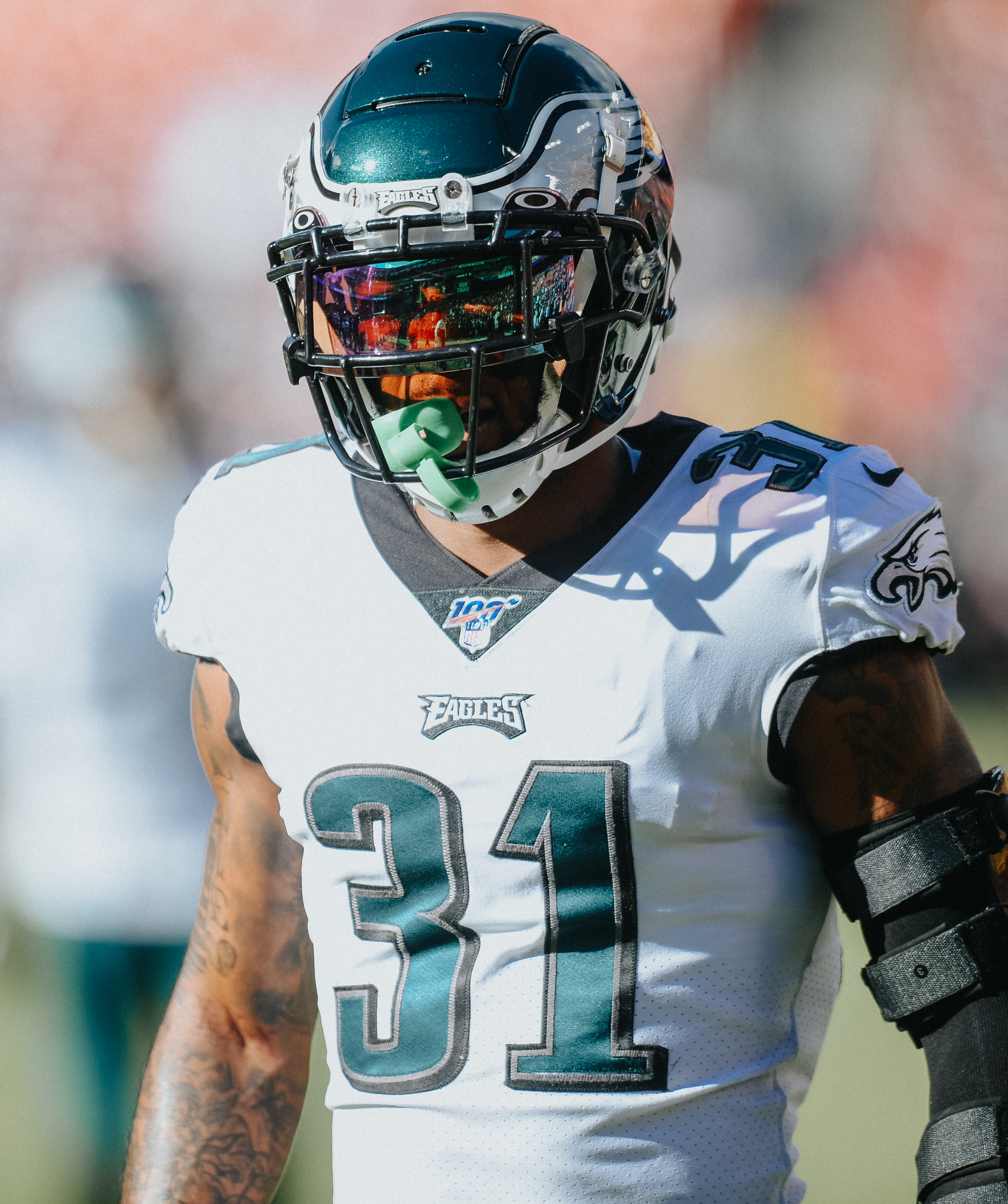
Mills in 2019

He made his season debut in week 7 against the Dallas Cowboys. In the game, Mills recorded an interception off a pass from Dak Prescott in the endzone in the 37–10 loss. He appeared in and started nine games in the 2019 season. He had 41 total tackles and one interception.

==== 2020 ====
On March 24, 2020, Mills signed a one-year contract with the Eagles. Mills switched to number #21 and would also play safety. In Week 3 against the Cincinnati Bengals, Mills recorded his first 1.5 sacks of the season during the 23–23 tie. In Week 7 against the Giants, Mills recorded his first interception of the season off a pass thrown by Daniel Jones during the 22–21 win. Mills was placed on the reserve/COVID-19 list by the Eagles on December 31, 2020, and activated on January 28, 2021. In the 2020 season, Mills appeared in and started 15 games. He finished with 1.5 sacks, 74 total tackles, one interception, three passes defended, and one forced fumble.

=== New England Patriots ===
On March 19, 2021, Mills signed a four-year, $24 million contract with the Patriots. In his first season with the Patriots, Mills was mainly used as the cornerback No. 2 behind J.C. Jackson. He finished the 2021 season with 47 total tackles, seven passes defended, and one fumble recovery in 16 games and starts.

In the 2022 season, Mills recorded 31 total tackles, two interceptions, and five passes defended in ten games and starts.

On March 17, 2023, Mills was released by the Patriots. He was re-signed five days later.

=== New York Giants ===
On March 12, 2024, Mills signed with the New York Giants. He was released from the NFI list on August 15.

=== New York Jets ===
On September 24, 2024, Mills signed with the New York Jets practice squad. He was promoted to the active roster on October 23. In nine games (eight starts) for the Jets, Mills totaled one interception, six pass deflections, and 44 combined tackles. He was placed on injured reserve on December 18.

=== Houston Texans ===
On August 11, 2025, Mills signed with the Houston Texans. He was released on August 26 as part of final roster cuts, and re-signed to the practice squad on September 17. He was promoted to the active roster on December 6. However, three days later, Mills was released following the acquisition of Naquan Jones.

=== Detroit Lions ===
On December 10, 2025, Mills was claimed off waivers by the Detroit Lions. He made three appearances for the Lions, recording one pass defended and six combined tackles.

On September 21, 2026, Mills was added to the Detroit Lions' practice squad. After being elevated to the active roster for three straight weeks, he was released on October 13.

== NFL career statistics ==
Legend
	Won the Super Bowl
**Bold**	Career high

=== Regular season ===
Year	Team	Games		Tackles					Fumbles			Interceptions				
Year	Team	GP	GS	Cmb	Solo	Ast	TfL	Sck	FF	FR	Yds	Int	Yds	Avg	TD	PD
2016	PHI	16	2	62	52	10	0	0.0	0	0	0	0	0	0.0	0	7
2017	PHI	15	15	64	51	13	1	0.0	0	0	0	**3**	53	17.6	1	**14**
2018	PHI	8	8	42	36	6	1	0.0	0	0	0	0	0	0.0	0	9
2019	PHI	9	9	41	29	12	0	0.0	0	0	0	1	0	0.0	0	7
2020	PHI	15	15	**74**	**59**	15	**4**	**1.5**	**1**	0	0	1	5	5.0	0	3
2021	NE	16	**16**	47	35	12	1	0.0	0	**1**	0	0	0	0.0	0	7
2022	NE	10	10	31	26	5	1	0.0	0	0	0	2	28	14.0	0	5
2023	NE	**17**	8	45	26	19	1	0.0	**1**	0	0	0	0	0.0	0	1
2024	NYJ	9	8	44	17	**27**	1	0.0	**1**	0	0	1	0	0.0	0	6
2025	HOU	4	1	4	1	3	0	0	0	0	0	0	0	0	0	0
2025	DET	3	0	6	2	4	0.0	0	0	0	0	0	0	0	0	1
Career		122	92	460	334	126	10	1.5	3	1	0	8	86	10.7	1	60

=== Postseason ===
Year	Team	Games		Tackles					Fumbles			Interceptions				
Year	Team	GP	GS	Cmb	Solo	Ast	TfL	Sck	FF	FR	Yds	Int	Yds	Avg	TD	PD
2017	PHI	**3**	**3**	**13**	**10**	**3**	0	0.0	0	0	0	0	0	0.0	0	**5**
2019	PHI	1	1	4	3	1	0	0.0	0	0	0	0	0	0.0	0	0
Career		4	4	17	13	4	0	0.0	0	0	0	0	0	0.0	0	5

== Personal life ==
On June 10, 2014, Baton Rouge police arrested Mills on a suspicion of second degree battery against a woman that had occurred on May 4, 2014. It was said he had allegedly punched in the mouth a woman he was romantically involved with at his apartment near LSU. His parents bailed him out of East Baton Rouge Parish jail the following day, paying the $10,000 bond. Mills denied the allegations and said it was his girlfriend who assaulted the victim. His girlfriend, who was not identified, then admitted to assaulting the victim.

Mills is nicknamed the "Green Goblin" for his green hairdo.

On April 12, 2019, Mills was arrested and charged with disorderly affray for an altercation with Devin Robinson of the Washington Wizards, outside a DC nightclub. Robinson, who was also charged, was taken to the hospital for injuries.
