= Brandon Harris (quarterback) =

American football player (born 1995)

Current position
- Title: General manager
- Team: Texas

Biographical details
- Born: October 12, 1995 (age 30)
- Height: 6 ft 2 in (188 cm)

Playing career
- 2014–2016: LSU
- 2017: North Carolina
- Position: Quarterback

Coaching career (HC unless noted)
- 2019–2020: Texas (OA/asst. RB)

Administrative career (AD unless noted)
- 2021–2024: Texas (Director of recruiting)
- 2024-present: Texas (GM)

Brandon Harris (born October 12, 1995) is an American former football quarterback for the LSU Tigers and North Carolina Tar Heels. He is the current general manager of the Texas Longhorns football program.

== Early years ==
Harris attended Parkway High School in Bossier City, Louisiana. While at Parkway, he played for the football team. He was ranked by Rivals.com as a four-star recruit and the fifth best dual-threat quarterback in his class. Harris led Parkway High School undefeated all on the road during playoffs to the LHSAA 5A state championship in New Orleans, Louisiana, in Fall 2013. Harris committed to play college football at Louisiana State University in July 2013.

== College career ==
=== LSU ===
At LSU, Harris competed with Anthony Jennings for the Tigers starting job as a true freshman in 2014. Jennings would win the job, but Harris still earned playing time as the backup. On September 29, Harris was named the starter over Jennings for the team's sixth game against Auburn. In the 2014 season, he finished with 452 passing yards, six passing touchdowns, and two interceptions in eight games. In the 2015 season, he finished with 2,165 passing yards, 13 touchdowns, and six interceptions. In the 2016 season, he only appeared in two games.

=== North Carolina ===
On March 26, 2017, Harris decided to transfer to the University of North Carolina at Chapel Hill in order to continue his collegiate career. He competed with Chazz Surratt and Nathan Elliott to be the starter. In his lone season with the Tar Heels, he had 346 passing yards, one passing touchdown, and eight interceptions in six games.

=== College statistics ===
Year	Team	Passing								Rushing			
Year	Team	Cmp	Att	Pct	Yds	Avg	TD	Int	Rtg	Att	Yds	Avg	TD
2014	LSU	25	45	55.6	452	10.0	6	2	175.0	26	159	6.1	3
2015	LSU	149	277	53.8	2,165	7.8	13	6	130.6	67	226	3.4	4
2016	LSU	13	25	52.0	139	5.6	1	2	95.9	4	-15	-3.8	0
2017	North Carolina	35	71	49.3	346	4.9	1	8	72.3	34	86	2.5	0
Career		222	418	53.1	3,102	7.4	21	18	123.4	131	456	3.5	7

Pre-draft measurables
Height	Weight	Arm length	Hand span	Wingspan	40-yard dash	10-yard split	20-yard split	20-yard shuttle	Three-cone drill	Vertical jump	Broad jump
6 ft 1 3/4 in (1.87 m)	206 lb (93 kg)	32 1/2 in (0.83 m)	9 in (0.23 m)	6 ft 6 in (1.98 m)	4.80 s	1.65 s	2.70 s	4.64 s	7.53 s	29.5 in (0.75 m)	9 ft 2 in (2.79 m)
All values from Pro Day
