= Lamar Louis =

American football player (born 1993)

No. 52
- Position: Linebacker

Personal information
- Born: October 2, 1993 (age 33); Breaux Bridge, Louisiana, U.S.
- Listed height: 5 ft 10 in (1.78 m)
- Listed weight: 232 lb (105 kg)

Career information
- High school: Breaux Bridge
- College: LSU
- NFL draft: 2016: undrafted

Career history
- Arizona Cardinals (2016); New Orleans Saints (2016)*; Baltimore Ravens (2016); Dallas Cowboys (2017)*
- * Offseason or practice squad member only

Career NFL statistics
- Games played: 1
- Stats at Pro Football Reference

Lamar Louis (born October 2, 1993) is an American former professional football player who was a linebacker in the National Football League (NFL). He played college football for the Louisiana State Tigers and was signed as an undrafted free agent by the Arizona Cardinals in 2016.

== Early life ==
Louis attended Breaux Bridge High School, where he played high school football as both a running back and linebacker. During his senior year, he showcased his skills by rushing the ball 43 times for 293 yards and scoring one touchdown. On defense, he recorded 37 solo tackles, two sacks, one interception, one fumble recovery, and one forced fumble.

Louis was named a member of the ESPN All-Louisiana Football Team. He was also a 2011 LSWA Class 4A All-State offensive honorable mention. He was selected to the 2011 Press-Register Super Southeast 120. He was named to the 2012 Times Picayune Blue-Chip list. he was ranked #111 in the 2012 final Scout.com Southeast Top 150. He was a four-star prospect according to ESPN.com, Rivals.com, 247sports.com and Scout.com. He was also rated as Louisiana’s #6 prospect by ESPN.com and 247sports.com, and #7 by Rivals.com. He was ranked as the nation’s #10 athlete (someone who plays on both offense and defense) by ESPN.com, and #18 by Rivals.com.

== College career ==
Louis then attended Louisiana State University, where he majored in sports administration.

As a freshman in 2012, he appeared in 11 games with five starts. He finished the season with 13 tackles, of which five were solo, and two quarterback hurries. He started the final five games of the season due to injuries to Luke Muncie and Kwon Alexander. As a sophomore in 2013, he appeared in all 13 games of the season as a back-up to D. J. Welter. He recorded 25 tackles (11 solo) and two fumble recoveries. As a junior in 2014, he appeared in 12 games, with 10 starts at Sam linebacker. He recorded 29 tackles, 2.5 tackles-for-loss and one forced fumble. As a senior in 2015, he appeared in 12 games with two starts. He recorded 30 tackles and one tackle-for-loss.

== Professional career ==
Pre-draft measurables
Height	Weight	Arm length	Hand span	40-yard dash	10-yard split	20-yard split	20-yard shuttle	Three-cone drill	Vertical jump	Broad jump	Bench press
5 ft 10 1/4 in (1.78 m)	224 lb (102 kg)	31 in (0.79 m)	9 3/8 in (0.24 m)	4.53 s	1.60 s	2.68 s	4.38 s	7.31 s	33.5 in (0.85 m)	9 ft 6 in (2.90 m)	26 reps
All values from Pro Day

=== Arizona Cardinals ===
After going unselected in the 2016 NFL draft, Louis signed with the Arizona Cardinals. He was released on September 14, 2016.

=== New Orleans Saints ===
On November 1, 2016, Louis signed with the New Orleans Saints. He was released on December 6, 2016.

=== Baltimore Ravens ===
On December 13, 2016, Louis was signed by the Baltimore Ravens. He was waived on August 20, 2017.

=== Dallas Cowboys ===
On August 25, 2017, Louis was signed by the Dallas Cowboys. He was waived on September 2, 2017.

== Personal life ==
Louis is the son of Redell and Kennedy Louis. Louis married LSU basketball player Raigyne Moncrief in July 2017.
