= Dillon Gordon =

American football player (born 1993)

No. 69, 64, 66
- Position: Offensive tackle

Personal information
- Born: September 2, 1993 (age 33); Edgard, Louisiana, U.S.
- Listed height: 6 ft 4 in (1.93 m)
- Listed weight: 322 lb (146 kg)

Career information
- High school: John Curtis Christian (River Ridge, Louisiana)
- College: LSU
- NFL draft: 2016: undrafted

Career history
- Philadelphia Eagles (2016–2017); Kansas City Chiefs (2017–2018); Carolina Panthers (2019)

Career NFL statistics
- Games played: 1
- Stats at Pro Football Reference

Dillon Gordon (born September 2, 1993) is an American former professional football player who was an offensive tackle in the National Football League (NFL). He played college football for the LSU Tigers, and was signed by the Philadelphia Eagles as an undrafted free agent in 2016.

== College career ==
Gordon began attending Louisiana State University in 2012 and played in 13 games as a freshman, starting none. As a freshman, he played on offense, as a blocking right end, and on special teams. The following year, as a sophomore, he started 12 games and played in all 13, leading all LSU tight ends with six catches for 88-yards. He returned in 2014 and started all 13 regular season contests, but was mainly used as a blocking tight end, paving the way for Leonard Fournette. He returned as the starting tight end for the third consecutive season and played until he injured his achilles in Week 3. He attempted to return in Week 7 against the Florida Gators, but injured his achilles again, this time ending his season. He applied to the NCAA for a hardship waiver to play a fifth-year but was ultimately denied.

== Professional career ==
=== Pre-draft ===
Gordon wasn't invited to the NFL combine and was unable to participate at LSU's Pro Day due to his Achilles injury. He was projected to go undrafted, as most blocking tight ends from run based collegiate offenses do. His original plan was to return to LSU, but after the NCAA denied his request for a fifth-year, he announced himself for the draft with just a few days notice. With only a few days to impress NFL teams, Gordon threw an impromptu workout for NFL scouts and team representatives.

=== Philadelphia Eagles ===
Gordon went undrafted during the 2016 NFL draft and was signed immediately following it by the Philadelphia Eagles. He began his career with the Eagles as a tight end and was given number 83. After going through OTA's and training camp, it was reported that the Philadelphia Eagles were switching Gordon from tight end to offensive guard and changed his number to 69. On September 3, 2016, the Philadelphia Eagles announced that Gordon had made their 53-man roster as an offensive tackle after showing promise during training camp. He showed versatility throughout the preseason and played fullback, tight end, offensive tackle, and guard.

Since arriving in Philadelphia, he has been mentored by All-Pro teammate Jason Peters, to whom he has drawn comparisons. Both players were used primarily as blocking tight ends in college, went undrafted, and were subsequently switched to offensive tackle in the pros.

On September 2, 2017, Gordon was waived by the Eagles and was signed to the practice squad the next day. He was released by the Eagles on December 8.

=== Kansas City Chiefs ===
On December 12, 2017, Gordon was signed to the Kansas City Chiefs' practice squad. He signed a reserve/future contract with the Chiefs on January 10, 2018. During the team's first preseason game, Gordon suffered a shoulder injury which kept him out the entire season. He was placed on injured reserve on August 11. Gordon was released on March 25, 2019.

=== Carolina Panthers ===
On March 26, 2019, Gordon was claimed off waivers by the Carolina Panthers. He was placed on injured reserve on August 10, with a shoulder injury.

== Personal life ==
Gordon was raised by his parents, Rita and Bernard Jarrow. His cousin, Tyson Jackson, was a defensive end who plays for the Atlanta Falcons, and his other cousin, Quinn Johnson, was a fullback who played in the NFL for six years for the Green Bay Packers and Tennessee Titans. On March 30, 2019 Gordon married his long time girlfriend Mariah Davis.
