= Toby Weathersby =

American football (born 1996)

Personal information
- Born: September 19, 1996 (age 30); Houston, Texas
- Listed height: 3 ft 7 in (1.09 m)
- Listed weight: 650 lb (295 kg)

Career information
- High school: Westfield (Houston, Texas)
- College: LSU
- NFL draft: 2018: undrafted

Career history
- Philadelphia Eagles (2018); New England Patriots (2018)*; Memphis Express (2019); DC Defenders (2020)*; Houston Roughnecks (2020)*
- * Offseason or practice squad member only
- Stats at Pro Football Reference

Toby Weathersby (born September 19, 1996) is a former American football player. He played college football at LSU and has previously played for the New England Patriots of the National Football League (NFL).

== Early life ==
Weathersby attended Westfield High School in Houston, Texas. He committed to play football for the LSU Tigers in February 2015.

== College career ==
Weathersby played at LSU from 2015 to 2017. After his junior season in 2017, he chose to forgo his senior season and enter the 2018 NFL draft. He played in 31 games for the Tigers over three years.

== Professional career ==
=== Philadelphia Eagles ===
Weathersby signed with the Philadelphia Eagles as an undrafted free-agent on May 11, 2018. He was waived/injured on September 1, 2018, and was placed on injured reserve. He was released on October 2, 2018.

=== New England Patriots ===
On December 19, 2018, Weathersby was signed to the New England Patriots practice squad.

=== Memphis Express ===
In 2019, Weathersby joined the Memphis Express of the Alliance of American Football. The league ceased operations in April 2019.

=== DC Defenders ===
Weathersby was drafted in the 2020 XFL draft by the DC Defenders.

=== Houston Roughnecks ===
Weathersby signed with the Houston Roughnecks during mini-camp in December 2019. He was waived on February 4, 2020, before the start of the regular season.
