= Kevin Toliver =

American football player (born 1995)

- Toliver with the Chicago Bears in 2018

Profile
- Position: Cornerback

Personal information
- Born: November 24, 1995 (age 30); Marrero, Louisiana, U.S.
- Listed height: 6 ft 2 in (1.88 m)
- Listed weight: 192 lb (87 kg)

Career information
- High school: Trinity Christian Academy (Jacksonville, Florida)
- College: LSU
- NFL draft: 2018: undrafted

Career history
- Chicago Bears (2018–2019); Denver Broncos (2020–2021); Baltimore Ravens (2021); Indianapolis Colts (2023)*; Houston Roughnecks (2024)*; San Antonio Brahmas (2024)*
- * Offseason or practice squad member only

Career NFL statistics
- Total tackles: 32
- Pass deflections: 4
- Stats at Pro Football Reference

Kevin Toliver II (born November 24, 1995) is an American professional football cornerback. He played college football at LSU.

== Early life ==
Toliver attended Trinity Christian Academy in Jacksonville, Florida. In high school he played quarterback and cornerback for Trinity Christian. He committed to play football for the LSU Tigers on November 5, 2012, as a sophomore in high school.

== College career ==
As a true freshman in 2015, Toliver played in all 12 of LSU's games, tallying 35 tackles, one interception, and five pass deflections.

In 2016, as a sophomore, Toliver only played in seven games, missing the last five games due to a shoulder injury. In those seven games, he made 21 total tackles.

As a junior in 2017, Toliver played in 12 of LSU's 13 games, missing only their season opener against BYU. In 12 games, he compiled 28 tackles, one interception, one sack, two forced fumbles and 10 pass deflections. On January 8, 2018, Toliver announced that he would forgo his senior year in an effort to pursue a career in the National Football League (NFL).

== Professional career ==
Pre-draft measurables
Height	Weight	Arm length	Hand span	Vertical jump	Broad jump	Bench press
6 ft 2 in (1.88 m)	192 lb (87 kg)	30 1/8 in (0.77 m)	9 3/8 in (0.24 m)	33 in (0.84 m)	10 ft 0 in (3.05 m)	10 reps
All values from NFL Combine

=== Chicago Bears ===
Toliver signed with the Chicago Bears as an undrafted free agent on May 10, 2018. Toliver made his first NFL start on September 30, 2018 against the Tampa Bay Buccaneers and recorded 7 tackles.

On September 5, 2020, Toliver was waived by the Bears.

=== Denver Broncos ===
On September 8, 2020, Toliver was signed to the practice squad of the Denver Broncos. He was elevated to the active roster on September 26, 2020, for the team's week 3 game against the Buccaneers, and reverted to the practice squad after the game. He was signed to the active roster on November 5, 2020. He was placed on injured reserve on December 16, 2020. He was released on January 4, 2021.

=== Baltimore Ravens ===
On November 23, 2021, Toliver was signed to the Baltimore Ravens practice squad. He signed a reserve/future contract with the Ravens on January 10, 2022. He was waived on May 26.

=== Indianapolis Colts ===
On February 22, 2023, Toliver signed with the Indianapolis Colts. He was waived on August 29, 2023 and re-signed to the practice squad, but released the next day.

=== Houston Roughnecks ===
On October 18, 2023, Toliver signed a Letter of Intent with the Houston Roughnecks of the XFL. The Roughnecks brand was transferred to the Houston Gamblers when the XFL and United States Football League merged to create the United Football League (UFL).

=== San Antonio Brahmas ===
On January 5, 2024, Toliver was drafted by the San Antonio Brahmas during the 2024 UFL dispersal draft. He was removed from the roster on February 26, 2024.

=== NFL career statistics ===
Legend
	Led the league
**Bold**	Career high

Year	Team	GP	GS	Tackles				Interceptions					Fumbles	
Year	Team	GP	GS	Comb	Total	Ast	Sack	PD	Int	Yds	Avg	TDs	FF	FR
2018	CHI	15	1	16	14	2	0.0	2	2	0	0.0	0	0	0
2019	CHI	15	1	13	12	2	0.0	2	0	0	0.0	0	0	0
2020	DEN	2	0	3	3	1	0.0	0	1	0	0.0	0	0	0
Total		32	2	59	29	5	0.0	4	8	55	0.0	0	0	0
Source: NFL.com
