= Travin Dural =

American gridiron football player (born 1993)

No. 14
- Position: Wide receiver

Personal information
- Born: November 19, 1993 (age 33); Breaux Bridge, Louisiana, U.S.
- Listed height: 6 ft 2 in (1.88 m)
- Listed weight: 192 lb (87 kg)

Career information
- High school: Breaux Bridge (LA)
- College: LSU
- NFL draft: 2017: undrafted

Career history
- New Orleans Saints (2017–2018); Winnipeg Blue Bombers (2020)*
- * Offseason or practice squad member only
- Stats at Pro Football Reference

Travin Dural (born November 19, 1993) is an American former football wide receiver. He played college football at LSU.

== Early life ==
Dural attended Breaux Bridge High School in Breaux Bridge, Louisiana. As a senior, he had 42 receptions for 902 yards and 19 touchdowns. Also a standout in track & field, Dural claimed the 200-meter title at state high school meet with a time of 21.54 seconds, and was part of state champion relay team in the 4x200 (1:26.31). Dural was rated by Rivals.com as a four-star recruit. He committed to Louisiana State University (LSU) to play college football.

== College career ==
Dural missed his freshman season in 2012, due to a torn meniscus. He returned from the injury in 2013. Playing behind starters Jarvis Landry and Odell Beckham Jr., Dural played in 12 games, recording seven receptions for 145 yards and two touchdowns. In 2014, he became a starter for the first time. He played in 12 games, recording 37 receptions for 758 yards and seven touchdowns. After the season, he considered entering the 2015 NFL draft, but opted to return to LSU for the 2016 season.

== Professional career ==
Pre-draft measurables
| Height | Weight | Arm length | Hand span | 40-yard dash | 10-yard split | 20-yard split | 20-yard shuttle | Three-cone drill | Vertical jump | Broad jump |
|---|---|---|---|---|---|---|---|---|---|---|
| 6 ft 0 3/4 in (1.85 m) | 202 lb (92 kg) | 32 in (0.81 m) | 9 in (0.23 m) | 4.57 s | 1.53 s | 2.70 s | 4.55 s | 7.29 s | 30.5 in (0.77 m) | 9 ft 8 in (2.95 m) |
All values from NFL Combine

=== New Orleans Saints ===
Dural signed with the New Orleans Saints as an undrafted free agent on May 1, 2017. He was placed on the non-football injury list on July 19, 2017. He was waived on September 2, 2017, and was signed to the Saints' practice squad the next day. He signed a reserve/future contract with the Saints on January 16, 2018.

In training camp, Dural suffered a broken humerus and was placed on injured reserve on July 31, 2018.

Dural was waived during final roster cuts on August 30, 2019.

=== Winnipeg Blue Bombers ===
Dural signed a futures contract with the Winnipeg Blue Bombers of the Canadian Football League (CFL) on November 2, 2019. After the CFL canceled the 2020 season due to the COVID-19 pandemic, Dural chose to opt-out of his contract with the Blue Bombers on August 27, 2020.
