= Corey Thompson (American football) =

American football player (born 1993)

Profile
- Position: Linebacker

Personal information
- Born: December 23, 1993 (age 32); Missouri City, Texas, U.S.
- Listed height: 6 ft 1 in (1.85 m)
- Listed weight: 222 lb (101 kg)

Career information
- High school: Elkins (Missouri City, Texas)
- College: LSU
- NFL draft: 2018: undrafted

Career history
- Buffalo Bills (2018–2019); Hamilton Tiger-Cats (2021)*; Ottawa Redblacks (2022–2023)
- * Offseason or practice squad member only

Career NFL statistics
- Total tackles: 21
- Forced fumbles: 1
- Stats at Pro Football Reference

Corey Thompson (born December 23, 1993) is an American football linebacker. He played college football at LSU.

== Early life ==
Thompson was born and raised in Missouri City, Texas, and attended Elkins High School. He was a standout safety for the Knights football team and was ranked the 18th-best recruit at his position by both Rivals.com and 247Sports.com and 23rd by ESPN. Thompson initially committed to play college football at Texas A&M, but de-committed and accepted a scholarship to play for Louisiana State University after a late push by LSU coach Les Miles.

== College career ==
Thompson was a member LSU Tigers football team for six seasons, as he was forced to redshirt his junior and redshirt senior seasons due to injury, and played both linebacker and safety for the Tigers. In his final season, Thompson recorded 43 total tackles and six sacks. He graduated with a bachelor's degree in Sports Administration in 2015 and spent his final two years at LSU working on a Masters in Liberal Arts.

== Professional career ==
=== Buffalo Bills ===
Thompson signed with the Buffalo Bills as an undrafted free agent on April 28, 2018. Thompson was cut from the Bills' active roster at the end of training camp and subsequently re-signed to the team's practice squad on September 2, 2018. He was promoted to the Bills' active roster on November 19, 2018. Thompson made his NFL debut on November 25, 2018, in the Bills' 24–21 win over the Jacksonville Jaguars, recording one tackle. In his rookie season, Thompson played in six games (one start) with 14 tackles, including one for loss, and a forced fumble.

On September 4, 2020, Thompson was waived by the Bills.

=== Hamilton Tiger-Cats ===
Thompson was signed by the Hamilton Tiger-Cats of the Canadian Football League to their practice roster on September 20, 2021. He was released on October 19, 2021.

=== New York Jets ===
Thompson was signed to the New York Jets practice squad on November 16, 2021. He was released on November 23.

== Personal life ==
Thompson was born on December 23, 1993, to Tony Thompson (Shanté) and Dyan Webber. His father played wide receiver for Texas A&M and his mother was an All-American sprinter for Texas Southern University and was an alternate for the U.S.'s gold medal-winning 4 × 100 meters relay team at the 1992 Summer Olympics.
