= Malachi Dupre =

American football player (born 1995)

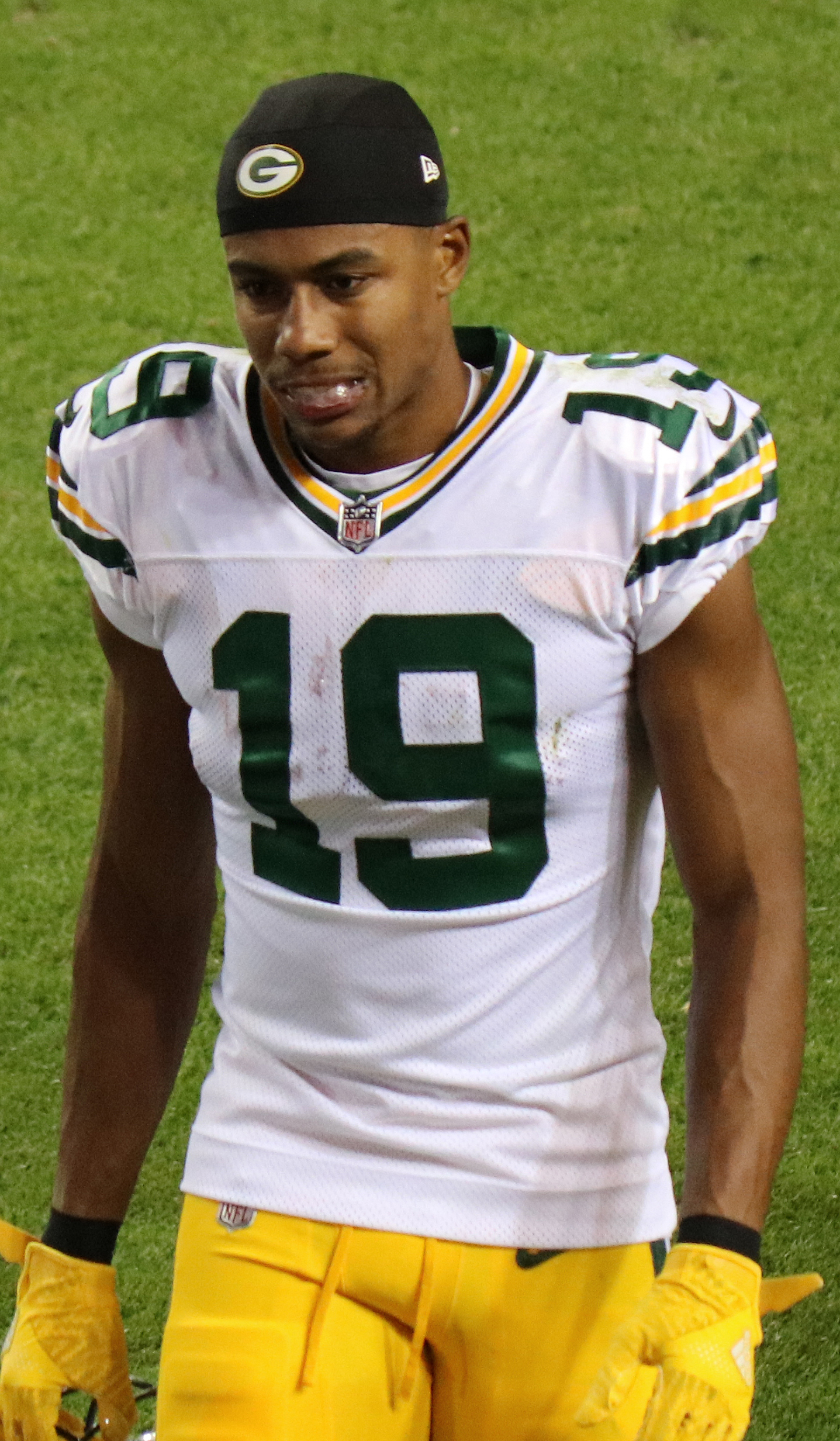
- Dupre with the Green Bay Packers in 2017

No. 15
- Position: Wide receiver

Personal information
- Born: October 12, 1995 (age 31); New Orleans, Louisiana, U.S.
- Listed height: 6 ft 2 in (1.88 m)
- Listed weight: 197 lb (89 kg)

Career information
- High school: John Curtis Christian (River Ridge, Louisiana)
- College: LSU
- NFL draft: 2017: 7th round, 247th overall pick

Career history
- Green Bay Packers (2017)*; Buffalo Bills (2017); Houston Texans (2018)*; Seattle Seahawks (2018)*; Arizona Cardinals (2018); Los Angeles Chargers (2019)*; DC Defenders (2020)
- * Offseason or practice squad member only

Career NFL statistics
- Games played: 1
- Stats at Pro Football Reference

Malachi Dupre (born October 12, 1995) is an American former professional football player who was a wide receiver in the National Football League (NFL). He played college football for the LSU Tigers (LSU). He was selected by the Green Bay Packers in the seventh round of the 2017 NFL draft.

== Early life ==
Dupre attended John Curtis Christian High School in River Ridge, Louisiana. As a senior, he recorded 34 receptions for 607 yards and six touchdowns and as a junior he had 36 receptions for 816 yards and 15 touchdowns. Dupre was rated as a five-star recruit and was either ranked as the first or second best receiver in his class by numerous scouting outlets. He committed to Louisiana State University (LSU) to play college football.

== College career ==
Dupre played in 12 games and made two starts as a true freshman at LSU in 2014. He finished the year with 14 receptions for 318 yards and five touchdowns. As a sophomore in 2015, Dupre played 12 games with 698 receiving yards and six touchdowns. As a junior in 2016, Dupre played 11 games with 593 receiving yards and three touchdowns. After the season, Dupre decided to forgo his senior year and enter the 2017 NFL draft.

== Professional career ==
Pre-draft measurables
Height	Weight	Arm length	Hand span	40-yard dash	10-yard split	20-yard split	20-yard shuttle	Three-cone drill	Vertical jump	Broad jump	Bench press	Wonderlic
6 ft 2 1/2 in (1.89 m)	196 lb (89 kg)	31 1/2 in (0.80 m)	9 in (0.23 m)	4.52 s	1.57 s	2.65 s	4.26 s	7.19 s	39 1/2 in (1.00 m)	11 ft 3 in (3.43 m)	11 reps	22
All values from NFL Combine

=== Green Bay Packers ===
The Green Bay Packers selected Dupre in the seventh round (247th overall) of the 2017 NFL draft. He was the 32nd and final wide receiver selected in the draft.

On May 5, 2017, the Packers signed Dupre to a four-year, $2.46 million contract that includes a signing bonus of $66,636. He was waived by the Packers on September 2.

=== Buffalo Bills ===
On September 12, 2017, Dupre was signed to the practice squad of the Buffalo Bills. He was promoted to the active roster on December 26. Dupre was released on September 1, 2018.

=== Houston Texans ===
On September 12, 2018, Dupre was signed to the Houston Texans' practice squad. He was released on September 18, 2018, but was re-signed a week later. He was released on November 12, 2018.

=== Seattle Seahawks ===
On November 20, 2018, Dupre was signed to the Seattle Seahawks practice squad, but was released a week later.

=== Arizona Cardinals ===
On December 5, 2018, Dupre was signed to the Arizona Cardinals practice squad. He was promoted to the active roster on December 28. Dupre was waived on May 22, 2019.

=== Los Angeles Chargers ===
On July 28, 2019, Dupre signed with the Los Angeles Chargers. He was waived by Los Angeles on August 31.

=== DC Defenders ===
Dupree was selected by the DC Defenders of the XFL in the supplemental draft of the 2020 XFL draft. He had his contract terminated when the league suspended operations on April 10, 2020.
