= 2015 Texas A&M Aggies football team =

American college football season

2015 Texas A&M Aggies football

Music City Bowl, L 21–27 vs. Louisville
- Conference: Southeastern Conference
- Western Division
- Record: 8–5 (4–4 SEC)
- Head coach: Kevin Sumlin (4th season)
- Offensive coordinator: Jake Spavital (3rd season)
- Offensive scheme: Spread
- Defensive coordinator: John Chavis (1st season)
- Base defense: Multiple 4–3
- Home stadium: Kyle Field

2015 Southeastern Conference football standings
	Conf.			Overall
Team	W		L	W		L
Eastern Division
No. 25 Florida x	7	–	1	10	–	4
No. 22 Tennessee	5	–	3	9	–	4
Georgia	5	–	3	10	–	3
Vanderbilt	2	–	6	4	–	8
Kentucky	2	–	6	5	–	7
Missouri*	1	–	7	5	–	7
South Carolina	1	–	7	3	–	9
Western Division
No. 1 Alabama x$#^	7	–	1	14	–	1
No. 10 Ole Miss	6	–	2	10	–	3
Arkansas	5	–	3	8	–	5
No. 16 LSU *	5	–	3	9	–	3
Texas A&M	4	–	4	8	–	5
Mississippi State	4	–	4	9	–	4
Auburn	2	–	6	7	–	6
Championship: Alabama 29, Florida 15
# – College Football Playoff champion; ^ – College Football Playoff participant; $ – Conference champion; x – Division champion/co-champions; * LSU and Missouri vacated all wins due to NCAA violations.; Rankings from AP Poll

The 2015 Texas A&M Aggies football team represented Texas A&M University in the 2015 NCAA Division I FBS football season. They played their home games at the newly renovated Kyle Field. They were members of the Western Division of the Southeastern Conference. They were led by fourth year head coach Kevin Sumlin. The Aggies finished the regular season 8–5 overall and 4–4 in SEC play. They were invited to the Music City Bowl, where they were defeated by the Louisville Cardinals, 27–21.

== Preseason ==
=== Recruiting class ===
In the 2015 recruiting class, Texas A&M signed 25 players, 11 of which were included in the ESPN 300 and 12 in the Scout 300. The class was ranked 12th in the nation by ESPN, 10th by Rivals, 12th by 247, and 10th by Scout.

College recruiting information (2015)
Name	Hometown	School	Height	Weight	40^{‡}	Commit date
Jay Bradford; RB	Splendora, TX	Splendora HS	5 ft 11 in (1.80 m)	190 lb (86 kg)	4.36	Aug 22, 2013
Jay Bradford; RB	Recruit ratings: Scout: Rivals: 247Sports: ESPN:					
Kendall Bussey; RB	New Orleans, LA	Isidore Newman HS	5 ft 9 in (1.75 m)	202 lb (92 kg)	4.42	Feb 2, 2015
Kendall Bussey; RB	Recruit ratings: Scout: Rivals: 247Sports: ESPN:					
Deshawn Capers-Smith; CB	New Orleans, LA	Warren Easton HS	6 ft 0 in (1.83 m)	175 lb (79 kg)	5.09	Feb 23, 2014
Deshawn Capers-Smith; CB	Recruit ratings: Scout: Rivals: 247Sports: ESPN:					
Jordan Davis; TE	Houston TX	Clear Lake HS	6 ft 5 in (1.96 m)	255 lb (116 kg)	–	Jun 25, 2013
Jordan Davis; TE	Recruit ratings: Scout: Rivals: 247Sports: ESPN:					
Justin Dunning; S	Whitehouse, TX	Whitehouse HS	6 ft 3 in (1.91 m)	201 lb (91 kg)	4.53	Nov 10, 2013
Justin Dunning; S	Recruit ratings: Scout: Rivals: 247Sports: ESPN:					
Landis Durham; LB	Plano, TX	Plano East HS	6 ft 3 in (1.91 m)	221 lb (100 kg)	4.69	Jun 15, 2014
Landis Durham; LB	Recruit ratings: Scout: Rivals: 247Sports: ESPN:					
Roney Elam; CB	Newton, TX	Newton HS	6 ft 3 in (1.91 m)	170 lb (77 kg)	–	Aug 15, 2014
Roney Elam; CB	Recruit ratings: Scout: Rivals: 247Sports: ESPN:					
Trevor Elbert; OL	Heath, TX	Rockwall-Heath HS	6 ft 6 in (1.98 m)	292 lb (132 kg)	5.02	Jan 26, 2014
Trevor Elbert; OL	Recruit ratings: Scout: Rivals: 247Sports: ESPN:					
Justin Evans; S	Wiggins, MS	Mississippi Gulf Coast CC	6 ft 0 in (1.83 m)	188 lb (85 kg)	4.50	May 1, 2014
Justin Evans; S	Recruit ratings: Scout: Rivals: 247Sports: ESPN:					
Riley Garner; LB	College Station, TX	A&M Consolidated HS	6 ft 3 in (1.91 m)	216 lb (98 kg)	4.66	May 21, 2014
Riley Garner; LB	Recruit ratings: Scout: Rivals: 247Sports: ESPN:					
Claude George; LB	Lafayette, LA	Hutchinson CC	6 ft 2 in (1.88 m)	233 lb (106 kg)	4.70	Oct 30, 2014
Claude George; LB	Recruit ratings: Scout: Rivals: 247Sports: ESPN:					
Kingsley Keke; DT	Richmond, TX	George Ranch HS	6 ft 7 in (2.01 m)	220 lb (100 kg)	5.06	Jun 4, 2014
Kingsley Keke; DT	Recruit ratings: Scout: Rivals: 247Sports: ESPN:					
Christian Kirk; WR	Scottsdale, AZ	Saguaro HS	5 ft 11 in (1.80 m)	192 lb (87 kg)	4.48	Dec 17, 2014
Christian Kirk; WR	Recruit ratings: Scout: Rivals: 247Sports: ESPN:					
Daniel Lacamera; K	Tarpon Springs, FL	East Lake HS	6 ft 4 in (1.93 m)	220 lb (100 kg)	–	Jun 24, 2014
Daniel Lacamera; K	Recruit ratings: Scout: Rivals: 247Sports: ESPN:					
Connor Lanfear; OL	Buda, TX	Hays HS	6 ft 6 in (1.98 m)	278 lb (126 kg)	–	Feb 28, 2014
Connor Lanfear; OL	Recruit ratings: Scout: Rivals: 247Sports: ESPN:					
James Lockhart; DE	Ennis, TX	Ennis HS	6 ft 3 in (1.91 m)	250 lb (110 kg)	4.70	Jul 25, 2014
James Lockhart; DE	Recruit ratings: Scout: Rivals: 247Sports: ESPN:					
Daylon Mack; DT	Gladewater, TX	Glade Water HS	6 ft 1 in (1.85 m)	328 lb (149 kg)	4.96	Feb 4, 2015
Daylon Mack; DT	Recruit ratings: Scout: Rivals: 247Sports: ESPN:					
Erik McCoy; OL	Lufkin, TX	Lufkin HS	6 ft 4 in (1.93 m)	307 lb (139 kg)	5.11	Nov 18, 2014
Erik McCoy; OL	Recruit ratings: Scout: Rivals: 247Sports: ESPN:					
Richard Moore; LB	Cedar Hill, TX	Cedar Hill HS	6 ft 1 in (1.85 m)	209 lb (95 kg)	4.80	Jan 2, 2015
Richard Moore; LB	Recruit ratings: Scout: Rivals: 247Sports: ESPN:					
Kyler Murray; QB	Allen, TX	Allen HS	5 ft 11 in (1.80 m)	177 lb (80 kg)	4.5	May 28, 2014
Kyler Murray; QB	Recruit ratings: Scout: Rivals: 247Sports: ESPN:					
Larry Pryor; S	Sulphur Springs, TX	Sulphur Springs HS	6 ft 0 in (1.83 m)	197 lb (89 kg)	4.66	Jan 30, 2014
Larry Pryor; S	Recruit ratings: Scout: Rivals: 247Sports: ESPN:					
Damion Ratley; WR	Yoakum, TX	Blinn CC	6 ft 2 in (1.88 m)	190 lb (86 kg)	4.47	Nov 28, 2014
Damion Ratley; WR	Recruit ratings: Scout: Rivals: 247Sports: ESPN:					
Kemah Siverand; WR	Houston, TX	Cypress Ridge HS	6 ft 1 in (1.85 m)	188 lb (85 kg)	4.47	May 29, 2014
Kemah Siverand; WR	Recruit ratings: Scout: Rivals: 247Sports: ESPN:					
Keaton Sutherland; OL	Flower Mound, TX	Marcus HS	6 ft 5 in (1.96 m)	282 lb (128 kg)	5.0	Jun 16, 2014
Keaton Sutherland; OL	Recruit ratings: Scout: Rivals: 247Sports: ESPN:					
Dwaine Thomas; LB	Boutte, LA	Hahnville HS	6 ft 3 in (1.91 m)	209 lb (95 kg)	4.60	Jan 17, 2015
Dwaine Thomas; LB	Recruit ratings: Scout: Rivals: 247Sports: ESPN:					
Overall recruit ranking: Scout: 10 Rivals: 10 247Sports: 12 ESPN: 12
‡ Refers to 40-yard dash; Note: In many cases, Scout, Rivals, 247Sports, On3, and ESPN may conflict in their listings of height, weight and 40 time.; In these cases, the average was taken. ESPN grades are on a 100-point scale.; Sources: "Texas A&M Football Commitment List 2015". Rivals.; "Texas A&M College Football Recruiting Commits 2015". Scout.; "Texas A&M Aggies Commits 2015". ESPN.; "Scout.com Team Recruiting Rankings". Scout.; "2015 Team Ranking". Rivals.com.

== Personnel ==
=== Roster ===
2015 Texas A&M Aggies football team roster
Players
Coaches
Offense

Pos.	#	Name	Class
QB	1	Kyler Murray	Fr
WR	2	Speedy Noil	So
WR	3	Christian Kirk	Fr
WR	4	Damion Ratley	So
RB	5	Tra Carson	Sr
QB	7	Jake Hubenak	So
WR	9	Ricky Seals-Jones	So
QB	10	Kyle Allen	So
WR	11	Josh Reynolds	Jr
WR	13	Jamal Jeffery	So
QB	14	Conner McQueen	Jr
WR	15	Frank Iheanacho	So
QB	16	Kobe Miller	Fr
WR	16	Kemah Siverand	Fr
QB	17	Jordan Traylor	Jr
WR	18	Edward Pope	Jr
QB	19	Janson Moore	So
WR	19	Jeremy Tabuyo	Jr
RB	20	James White	So
RB	21	Keith Ford (I)	Jr
RB	22	Kwame Etwi	Fr
WR	23	Sabian Holmes	Sr
RB	25	Kendall Bussey	Fr
RB	27	Brice Dolezal	Sr
RB	29	Jay Bradford	Fr
RB	34	Blaine Townsend	Sr
FB	39	Austin English	So
TE	41	Brandon Alexander	Sr
WR	42	Josch Motley	So
TE	47	Caden Smith	Sr
WR	48	Dreagan Patterson	Jr
OL	50	Tank Davis	Fr
OL	56	Mike Matthews (C)	Sr
OL	61	Braden Meador	Jr
OL	62	Chad Loitz	So
OL	63	Ryan Lindblade	Jr
OL	64	Erik McCoy	Fr
OL	65	Avery Gennesy	Jr
OL	66	Nathan Kellman
OL	67	Drew Beakey	Fr
OL	68	Justin Dworaczyk	Fr
OL	69	Brayden Talbert	Fr
OL	70	Connor Lanfear	Fr
OL	71	Trevor Elbert	Fr
OL	72	Jermaine Eluemunor	Jr
OL	73	Jeremiah Stuckey	Jr
OL	74	Germain Ifedi (C)	Jr
OL	75	Koda Martin	Fr
OL	77	J.J. Gustafson	So
OL	78	Keaton Sutherland	Fr
OL	79	Joseph Cheek	Sr
WR	81	Jalyn Judkins	So
WR	82	Boone Niederhofer	Jr
WR	83	Kyle Whitley	Fr
WR	84	Morgan Whatley	Fr
TE	85	Grant Gustafson	Fr
WR	85	Reggie Rusk	Fr
TE	87	Greer Shetler	Fr
WR	88	Thom Lam	Fr
TE	89	Jordan Davis	Fr

Defense

Pos.	#	Name	Class
DB	1	De'Vante Harris	Sr
DB	4	Noel Ellis	Jr
DL	5	Daylon Mack	Fr
DB	6	Donovan Wilson	So
LB	7	Richard Moore	Fr
DB	8	Nick Harvey	So
DL	9	Qualen Cunningham	So
DL	10	Daeshon Hall	Jr
LB	11	Josh Walker	So
DB	12	Sam Moeller (C)	Sr
LB	13	Reggie Chevis	So
DB	14	Justin Evans	Jr
DL	15	Myles Garrett (C)	So
LB	16	Dwaine Thomas	Fr
DB	17	Alex Sezer Jr.	Jr
DB	18	Larry Pryor	Fr
DB	19	DeShawn Capers-Smith	Fr
DB	21	Brandon Williams (C)	Sr
DB	23	Armani Watts	So
DB	25	Priest Willis (I)	Jr
DB	26	Devonta Burns	Sr
DB	27	Roney Elam	Fr
DB	28	Victor Davis	So
DB	30	Justin Dunning	Fr
LB	31	Claude George	Jr
DB	32	Will Paulhill	Jr
LB	32	Kevin Wilson	Sr
LB	33	Shaan Washington	Jr
LB	35	Riley Garner	Fr
DL	40	Jarrett Johnson	So
LB	42	Otaro Alaka	So
LB	45	Cullen Gillaspia	So
LB	46	A.J. Hilliard	Jr
LB	48	Landis Durham	Fr
LB	49	Taylor Martinez	Jr
LB	50	Mac Labhart	Fr
LB	52	Tristan Horton	Fr
DL	53	Ben Huskinson	So
LB	54	Jake Blount	Jr
DL	55	Justin Manning	So
DL	59	Isaac Flores	Jr
DL	83	Alonzo Williams	Sr
DL	86	David Darley	So
DL	88	Kingsley Keke	Fr
DL	90	Deshawn Washington	Fr
DL	92	Zaycoven Henderson	So
DL	94	Tanner Schorp	So
DL	95	Julien Obioha	Sr
DL	98	Hardreck Walker	Jr
DL	99	James Lockhart	Fr

Special teams

Pos.	#	Name	Class
PK	24	Taylor Bertolet	Sr
PK/P	36	Daniel LaCamera	Fr
P	38	Drew Kaser	Sr
DS	40	Christian Robertson	Fr
PK	41	Peter Grady	Jr
DS	45	Austin Frey	Fr
P	46	Shane Tripucka	So

Head coach

- Kevin Sumlin (4th season)

Coordinators/assistant coaches

- Jeff Banks – Special teams coordinator/tight ends
- John Chavis – Defensive coordinator/linebackers
- Dave Christensen – Offensive line/running game coordinator
- Mark Hagen – Defensive tackles
- Mikado Hinson – Director of player development
- Larry Jackson – Director of football sports performance
- Scott Johnston – Director of recruiting
- Terry Joseph – Secondary
- Clarence McKinney – Running backs
- Justin Moore – Associate Athletic Director
- Aaron Moorehead – Wide receivers
- Terry Price – Defensive ends
- Gary Reynolds – Director of football operations
- Jake Spavital – Offensive coordinator/quarterbacks
- Jeremy Springer – Special teams quality control

Legend

- (C) Team captain
- (S) Suspended
- (I) Ineligible
- Injured
- Redshirt

Roster
Last update: August 26, 2015

== Schedule ==
Texas A&M announced their 2015 football schedule on October 14, 2014. The 2015 schedule consist of 9 games in the state of Texas and 3 games outside of the state in the regular season. Two of the nine games in Texas are neutral games against Arizona State and Arkansas. Texas A&M will host SEC foes Alabama, Auburn, Mississippi State, and South Carolina, and will travel to LSU, Ole Miss, and Vanderbilt.

This will be the Aggies' first year without Missouri since 2009 and SMU since 2010 on their schedule.

The Aggies' 25–0 shutout of Vanderbilt on November 21 was Texas A&M's first shutout victory since joining the SEC in 2012. The Aggies had not shut out a team since a 31–0 victory over Wyoming on September 11, 2004, and had not shut out a conference opponent since a 41–0 victory over Baylor on October 12, 2002.

Date	Time	Opponent	Rank	Site	TV	Result	Attendance
September 5	6:00 p.m.	vs. No. 15 Arizona State*		NRG Stadium; Houston, TX (Texas Kickoff)	ESPN	W 38–17	66,308
September 12	6:00 p.m.	Ball State*	No. 16	Kyle Field; College Station, TX	ESPNU	W 56–23	104,213
September 19	11:00 a.m.	Nevada*	No. 17	Kyle Field; College Station, TX	SECN	W 44–27	102,591
September 26	6:00 p.m.	vs. Arkansas	No. 14	AT&T Stadium; Arlington, TX (Southwest Classic)	ESPN	W 28–21 ^{OT}	67,339
October 3	6:30 p.m.	No. 21 Mississippi State	No. 14	Kyle Field; College Station, TX	SECN	W 30–17	104,455
October 17	2:30 p.m.	No. 10 Alabama	No. 9	Kyle Field; College Station, TX (SEC Nation)	CBS	L 23–41	105,733
October 24	6:00 p.m.	at No. 24 Ole Miss	No. 15	Vaught–Hemingway Stadium; Oxford, MS	ESPN	L 3–23	60,674
October 31	11:00 a.m.	South Carolina		Kyle Field; College Station, TX	SECN	W 35–28	102,154
November 7	6:30 p.m.	Auburn	No. 19	Kyle Field; College Station, TX	SECN	L 10–26	104,625
November 14	6:00 p.m.	Western Carolina*		Kyle Field; College Station, TX	ESPNU	W 41–17	101,583
November 21	6:30 p.m.	at Vanderbilt		Vanderbilt Stadium; Nashville, TN	SECN	W 25–0	32,482
November 28	6:30 p.m.	at LSU		Tiger Stadium; Baton Rouge, LA (rivalry)	SECN	L 7–19	101,803
December 30	6:00 p.m.	vs. Louisville*		Nissan Stadium; Nashville, TN (Music City Bowl)	ESPN	L 21–27	50,478
*Non-conference game; Rankings from AP Poll and CFP Rankings after November 3 released prior to game; All times are in Central time

Schedule source:

== Coaching staff ==
Name	Position	Season at Texas A&M
Kevin Sumlin	Head coach	4th
John Chavis	Associate head coach, defensive coordinator, and linebackers coach	1st
Terry Joseph	Defensive backs coach	2nd
Terry Price	Defensive ends coach	4th
Mark Hagen	Defensive tackles coach	3rd
Jake Spavital	Offensive coordinator and quarterbacks coach	3rd
Clarence McKinney	Running backs coach	4th
Aaron Morehead	Wide receivers coach	1st
Dave Christenson	Offensive line coach and run game coordinator	1st
Jeff Banks	Special teams coordinator and tight ends coach	3rd
Larry Jackson	Director of football sports performance	4th
Jeremy Springer	Special teams quality control coach	1st

== Game summaries ==
=== #15 Arizona State ===
	1	2	3	4	Total
#15 Sun Devils	0	7	7	3	17
Aggies	7	7	3	21	38

=== Ball State ===
	1	2	3	4	Total
Cardinals	3	0	10	10	23
#16 Aggies	28	21	0	7	56

The game was the home opener for A&M, and the first game in the newly renovated Kyle Field. The Aggies were dominant throughout the entire first half, with the exception being Ball State's first drive to A&M's 4 yard line.

=== Nevada ===
	1	2	3	4	Total
Wolfpack	7	3	10	7	27
#17 Aggies	14	10	14	6	44

=== Arkansas ===
	1	2	3	4	OT	Total
#14 Aggies	0	10	3	8	7	28
Razorbacks	7	0	7	7	0	21

=== #21 Mississippi State ===
	1	2	3	4	Total
#21 Bulldogs	3	7	0	7	17
#14 Aggies	14	10	3	3	30

=== #10 Alabama ===
	1	2	3	4	Total
#10 Crimson Tide	14	14	3	10	41
#9 Aggies	3	10	7	3	23

=== #24 Ole Miss ===
	1	2	3	4	Total
#15 Aggies	0	3	0	0	3
#24 Rebels	7	9	7	0	23

=== South Carolina ===
	1	2	3	4	Total
Gamecocks	7	14	7	0	28
Aggies	7	14	14	0	35

=== Auburn ===
	1	2	3	4	Total
Tigers	7	7	6	6	26
#25 Aggies	3	0	7	0	10

=== Western Carolina ===
	1	2	3	4	Total
Catamounts	0	14	0	3	17
Aggies	7	14	13	7	41

=== Vanderbilt ===
	1	2	3	4	Total
Aggies	6	10	6	3	25
Commodores	0	0	0	0	0

=== LSU [ win vacated ] ===
	1	2	3	4	Total
Aggies	7	0	0	0	7
Tigers	6	0	7	6	19

Texas A&M won this game, because the NCAA vacated LSU's victory.

=== Louisville ===
	1	2	3	4	Total
Aggies	7	7	0	7	21
Cardinals	20	0	7	0	27

== Rankings ==
Ranking movements Legend: ██ Increase in ranking ██ Decrease in ranking — = Not ranked RV = Received votes ( ) = First-place votes
	Week															
Poll	Pre	1	2	3	4	5	6	7	8	9	10	11	12	13	14	Final
AP	RV	16	17	14	14	9 (1)	9 (1)	15	RV	25	RV	RV	RV	—	—	
Coaches	RV	19	18	15	15	11	10	16	RV	24	RV	RV	RV	RV	RV	
CFP	Not released									19	—	—	—	—	—	Not released
