= 2015 Ole Miss Rebels football team =

American college football season

2015 Ole Miss Rebels football

Sugar Bowl champion

Sugar Bowl, W 48–20 vs. Oklahoma State
- Conference: Southeastern Conference
- Western Division

Ranking
- Coaches: No. 9
- AP: No. 10
- Record: 10–3 (6–2 SEC)
- Head coach: Hugh Freeze (4th season)
- Co-offensive coordinators: Matt Luke (4th season); Dan Werner (6th season)
- Offensive scheme: Spread
- Co-defensive coordinators: Dave Wommack (4th season); Jason Jones (3rd season)
- Base defense: 4–2–5
- Captains: Justin Bell; Evan Engram; Mike Hilton; C.J. Johnson
- Home stadium: Vaught–Hemingway Stadium

2015 Southeastern Conference football standings
	Conf.			Overall
Team	W		L	W		L
Eastern Division
No. 25 Florida x	7	–	1	10	–	4
No. 22 Tennessee	5	–	3	9	–	4
Georgia	5	–	3	10	–	3
Vanderbilt	2	–	6	4	–	8
Kentucky	2	–	6	5	–	7
Missouri*	1	–	7	5	–	7
South Carolina	1	–	7	3	–	9
Western Division
No. 1 Alabama x$#^	7	–	1	14	–	1
No. 10 Ole Miss	6	–	2	10	–	3
Arkansas	5	–	3	8	–	5
No. 16 LSU *	5	–	3	9	–	3
Texas A&M	4	–	4	8	–	5
Mississippi State	4	–	4	9	–	4
Auburn	2	–	6	7	–	6
Championship: Alabama 29, Florida 15
# – College Football Playoff champion; ^ – College Football Playoff participant; $ – Conference champion; x – Division champion/co-champions; * LSU and Missouri vacated all wins due to NCAA violations.; Rankings from AP Poll

The 2015 Ole Miss Rebels football team represented the University of Mississippi in the 2015 NCAA Division I FBS football season. The Rebels played their home games at Vaught–Hemingway Stadium in Oxford, Mississippi and competed in the Western Division of the Southeastern Conference (SEC). They were led by fourth-year head coach Hugh Freeze.

== Recruiting class ==
The 2015 Ole Miss recruiting class finished with 23 total commits, and finished in the top 20 recruiting classes of 2015 according to 247 sports. The Rebels signed seven four star recruits and fifteen three star recruits, but the only five star recruit they signed was wide receiver Damarkus Lodge.

College recruiting (2015)
Name	Hometown	School	Height	Weight	40^{‡}	Commit date
Damarkus Lodge #6 WR	Cedar Hill, TX	Cedar High School	6 ft 2 in (1.88 m)	190 lb (86 kg)	–	Feb 4, 2015
Damarkus Lodge #6 WR	Recruit ratings: Scout: Rivals: 247Sports: ESPN:					
Kendall Sheffield #3 OG	Petal, MS	Petal High School	6 ft 3 in (1.91 m)	307 lb (139 kg)	–	Nov 20, 2014
Kendall Sheffield #3 OG	Recruit ratings: Scout: Rivals: 247Sports: ESPN:					
Van Jefferson #11 WR	Brentwood, TN	Ravenwood High School	6 ft 2 in (1.88 m)	181 lb (82 kg)	–	Jan 25, 2015
Van Jefferson #11 WR	Recruit ratings: Scout: Rivals: 247Sports: ESPN:					
Eric Swinney #4 CB	Tyrone, GA	Sandy Creek High School	5 ft 9 in (1.75 m)	197 lb (89 kg)	–	May 16, 2014
Eric Swinney #4 CB	Recruit ratings: Scout: Rivals: 247Sports: ESPN:					
D.J. Jones #12 JUCO	Piedmont, SC	Wren High School	6 ft 0 in (1.83 m)	324 lb (147 kg)	–	Dec 17, 2014
D.J. Jones #12 JUCO	Recruit ratings: Scout: Rivals: 247Sports: ESPN:					
Tony Bridges #6 JUCO	Hattiesburg, MS	Hattiesburg High School	6 ft 0 in (1.83 m)	183 lb (83 kg)	–	Nov 21, 2014
Tony Bridges #6 JUCO	Recruit ratings: Scout: Rivals: 247Sports: ESPN:					
Armani Linton #15 S	Walnut, MS	Walnut Attendance Center	6 ft 3 in (1.91 m)	210 lb (95 kg)	–	Jun 6, 2014
Armani Linton #15 S	Recruit ratings: Scout: Rivals: 247Sports: ESPN:					
Willie Hibbler #23 ATH	Orange, TX	North Panola High School	6 ft 5 in (1.96 m)	220 lb (100 kg)	–	Aug 16, 2013
Willie Hibbler #23 ATH	Recruit ratings: Scout: Rivals: 247Sports: ESPN:					
Cameron Ordway #36 CB	Pulaski, TN	Giles County High School	6 ft 1 in (1.85 m)	180 lb (82 kg)	–	Sep 19, 2014
Cameron Ordway #36 CB	Recruit ratings: Scout: Rivals: 247Sports: ESPN:					
Jason Pellerin #23 QB	New Iberia, LA	Catholic High School	6 ft 5 in (1.96 m)	225 lb (102 kg)	–	Jun 8, 2014
Jason Pellerin #23 QB	Recruit ratings: Scout: Rivals: 247Sports: ESPN:					
Chad Kelly #10 JUCO	Buffalo, NY	Saint Joseph School	6 ft 1 in (1.85 m)	210 lb (95 kg)	–	Dec 10, 2014
Chad Kelly #10 JUCO	Recruit ratings: Scout: Rivals: 247Sports: ESPN:					
Alex Givens #39 OT	Nashville, TN	Shades Valley HS	6 ft 6 in (1.98 m)	290 lb (130 kg)	–	Sep 11, 2014
Alex Givens #39 OT	Recruit ratings: Scout: Rivals: 247Sports: ESPN:					
Jalen Julius #120 WR	Winter Garden, FL	West Orange High School	5 ft 11 in (1.80 m)	172 lb (78 kg)	–	Feb 4, 2014
Jalen Julius #120 WR	Recruit ratings: Scout: Rivals: 247Sports: ESPN:					
Austrian Robinson #78 DE	Pawling, NY	Trinity-Pawling School	6 ft 5 in (1.96 m)	265 lb (120 kg)	–	Feb 4, 2015
Austrian Robinson #78 DE	Recruit ratings: Scout: Rivals: 247Sports: ESPN:					
Michael Howard #25 OT	Coconut Creek, FL	Clay High School	6 ft 6 in (1.98 m)	255 lb (116 kg)	–	Dec 10, 2014
Michael Howard #25 OT	Recruit ratings: Scout: Rivals: 247Sports: ESPN:					
Ross Donnelly #43 DT	Cypress, TX	Cy-Fair High School	6 ft 2 in (1.88 m)	300 lb (140 kg)	–	Feb 2, 2015
Ross Donnelly #43 DT	Recruit ratings: Scout: Rivals: 247Sports: ESPN:					
Dallas Warmack #19 OG	Hampton, GA	Lovejoy	6 ft 2 in (1.88 m)	306 lb (139 kg)	–	Feb 2, 2015
Dallas Warmack #19 OG	Recruit ratings: Scout: Rivals: 247Sports: ESPN:					
Terry Caldwell #80 JUCO	Wilmington, NC	Hoggard High School	6 ft 1 in (1.85 m)	216 lb (98 kg)	–	Dec 9, 2014
Terry Caldwell #80 JUCO	Recruit ratings: Scout: Rivals: 247Sports: ESPN:					
Zedrick Woods #92 OLB	Tallahassee, FL	Columbia High School	6 ft 2 in (1.88 m)	192 lb (87 kg)	–	Jul 11, 2014
Zedrick Woods #92 OLB	Recruit ratings: Scout: Rivals: 247Sports: ESPN:					
Shawn Curtis #102 DE	Miami, FL	Donald Regean High School	6 ft 4 in (1.93 m)	250 lb (110 kg)	–	Feb 4, 2015
Shawn Curtis #102 DE	Recruit ratings: Scout: Rivals: 247Sports: ESPN:					
Overall recruit ranking: Scout: 16 Rivals: 21 247Sports: 17 ESPN: 19
‡ Refers to 40-yard dash; Note: In many cases, Scout, Rivals, 247Sports, On3, and ESPN may conflict in their listings of height, weight and 40 time.; In these cases, the average was taken. ESPN grades are on a 100-point scale.; Sources: "Ole Miss Signee List 2015". Rivals.; "Scout.com Football Recruiting: Ole Miss". Scout.; "2015 Player Signees – Ole Miss". ESPN.; "Scout.com Team Recruiting Rankings". Scout.; "2015 Team Ranking". Rivals.com.; "2015 Ole Miss Rebels football team". 247Sports.

== Coaching staff ==
Name	Position	Year at Ole Miss	Alma mater (Year)
Hugh Freeze	Head coach	4th	Southern Miss (1992)
Matt Luke	Assistant head coach/co-offensive coordinator/offensive line	4th	Ole Miss (2000)
Dan Werner	Co-offensive coordinator/quarterbacks	4th	Western Michigan (1983)
Maurice Harris	Tight ends/recruiting coordinator For Offense	4th	Arkansas State (1998)
Grant Heard	Wide receivers	4th	Ole Miss (2001)
Derrick Nix	Running backs	8th	Southern Miss (2002)
Jason Jones	Co-defensive coordinator/cornerbacks	3rd	Alabama (2001)
Dave Wommack	Associate head coach for Defense/co-defensive coordinator/linebackers	4th	Missouri Southern State (1978)
Chris Kiffin	Defensive line/recruiting coordinator For Defense	4th	Colorado State (2005)
Corey Batoon	Special teams Coach/safeties	1st	Long Beach State (1991)
Paul Jackson	Head strength & conditioning coach	4th	Montclair State (2006)

== Schedule ==
Ole Miss announced its 2015 football schedule on October 14, 2014. The 2015 schedule consists of 7 home games and 5 away games in the regular season and is considered to be the 10th toughest schedule in the FBS for the 2015 season. The Rebels will host SEC foes Arkansas, LSU, Texas A&M, and Vanderbilt, and will travel to Alabama, Auburn, Florida, and Mississippi State.

Date	Time	Opponent	Rank	Site	TV	Result	Attendance
September 5	11:00 a.m.	Tennessee–Martin*	No. 17	Vaught–Hemingway Stadium; Oxford, MS	SECN	W 76–3	60,186
September 12	2:30 p.m.	Fresno State*	No. 17	Vaught–Hemingway Stadium; Oxford, MS	ESPN2	W 73–21	60,302
September 19	8:15 p.m.	at No. 2 Alabama	No. 15	Bryant–Denny Stadium; Tuscaloosa, AL (rivalry) (College GameDay)	ESPN	W 43–37	101,821
September 26	6:00 p.m.	Vanderbilt	No. 3	Vaught–Hemingway Stadium; Oxford, MS (rivalry)	ESPNU	W 27–16	60,654
October 3	6:00 p.m.	at No. 25 Florida	No. 3	Ben Hill Griffin Stadium; Gainesville, FL	ESPN	L 10–38	90,585
October 10	11:00 a.m.	New Mexico State*^{†}	No. 14	Vaught–Hemingway Stadium; Oxford, MS	SECN	W 52–3	60,154
October 17	11:00 a.m.	at Memphis*	No. 13	Liberty Bowl Memorial Stadium; Memphis, TN (rivalry)	ABC/ESPN2	L 24–37	60,241
October 24	6:00 p.m.	No. 15 Texas A&M	No. 24	Vaught–Hemingway Stadium; Oxford, MS	ESPN	W 23–3	60,674
October 31	11:00 a.m.	at Auburn	No. 19	Jordan–Hare Stadium; Auburn, AL (rivalry)	ESPN	W 27–19	87,451
November 7	2:30 p.m.	Arkansas	No. 18	Vaught–Hemingway Stadium; Oxford, MS (rivalry / SEC Nation)	CBS	L 52–53 ^{OT}	60,680
November 21	2:30 p.m.	No. 15 LSU	No. 22	Vaught–Hemingway Stadium; Oxford, MS (Magnolia Bowl)	CBS	W 38–17	60,705
November 28	6:15 p.m.	at No. 21 Mississippi State	No. 18	Davis Wade Stadium; Starkville, MS (Egg Bowl)	ESPN2	W 38–27	62,265
January 1, 2016	7:30 p.m.	vs. No. 16 Oklahoma State*	No. 12	Mercedes-Benz Superdome; New Orleans, LA (Sugar Bowl)	ESPN	W 48–20	72,117
*Non-conference game; ^{†}Homecoming; Rankings from AP Poll and College Football Playoff poll beginning Nov 3 released prior to game; All times are in Central time

Schedule source:

== Game summaries ==
=== UT Martin ===
Uniform Combination
Helmet	Jersey	Pants

UT Martin Skyhawks (0–0) at No. 17 Ole Miss Rebels (0–0)

Quarter	1	2	3	4	Total
Skyhawks	0	0	3	0	3
No. 17 Rebels	27	14	14	21	76

at Vaught–Hemingway Stadium • Oxford, Mississippi

- Date: September 5
- Game time: 11:00 a.m. CST
- Game weather: Sunny • Temperature: 87 °F (31 °C)
- Game attendance: 60,186
- Referee: Mark Curles
- TV announcers (SECN Alt.): Cole Cubelic (play-by-play), Mike Couzens (color), and Kevin Weidl (sideline)

Game information

First Quarter

- (11:06) Ole Miss – Jaylen Walton 60 yard run (Two-Point Run Conversion Failed)
  Ole Miss 6–0; 1 play, 60 yards, 0:09
- (6:42) Ole Miss – Jaylen Walton 4 yard run (Gary Wunderlich kick)
  Ole Miss 13–0; 5 plays, 26 yards, 0:51
- (5:28) Ole Miss – Markell Pack 56 yard pass from Chad Kelly (Gary Wunderlich kick)
  Ole Miss 20–0; 1 play, 56 yards, 0:08
- (1:06) Ole Miss – Quincy Adeboyejo 15 yard pass from Ryan Buchanan (Gary Wunderlich kick)
  Ole Miss 27–0; 8 plays, 38 yards, 2:05

Second Quarter

- (12:35) Ole Miss – Robert Nkemdiche 31 yard pass from Ryan Buchanan (Gary Wunderlich kick)
  Ole Miss 34–0; 8 plays, 77 yards, 2:40
- (3:15) Ole Miss – Cody Core 57 yard pass from Chad Kelly (Gary Wunderlich kick)
  Ole Miss 41–0; 3 plays, 80 yards, 0:37

Third Quarter

- (9:09) Ole Miss – Trae Elston 93 yard interception return (Gary Wunderlich kick)
  Ole Miss 48–0
- (4:56) Ole Miss – Chad Kelly 20 yard run (Gary Wunderlich kick)
  Ole Miss 55–0; 5 plays, 53 yards, 1:56
- (2:26) UT Martin – Redditt Jackson 29 yard field goal
  Ole Miss 55–3; 5 plays, 68 yards, 2:20

Fourth Quarter

- (10:27) Ole Miss – DaMarkus Lodge 12 yard pass from DeVante Kincade (Gary Wunderlich kick)
  Ole Miss 62–3; 14 plays, 75 yards, 6:50
- (7:34) Ole Miss – Eugene Brazley 70 yard run (Andy Pappanastos kick)
  Ole Miss 69–3; 3 plays, 82 yards, 1:40
- (3:19) Ole Miss – D.K. Buford 20 yard run (Andy Pappanastos kick)
  Ole Miss 76–3; 6 plays, 80 yards, 3:08

Statistics	UTM	MISS
First downs	13	28
Total yards	290	662
Rushes/yards	39/116	36/338
Passing yards	174	324
Passing: Comp–Att–Int	16–29–1	19–28–1
Time of possession	36:09	23:51

Team	Category	Player	Statistics
Tennessee–Martin	Passing	Jarod Neal	13/24, 139 yards, 1 INT
Tennessee–Martin	Rushing	Trent Garland	8 carries, 36 yards
Tennessee–Martin	Receiving	Najee Ray	1 reception, 64 yards
Ole Miss	Passing	Chad Kelly	9/15, 211 yards, 2 TD, 1 INT
Ole Miss	Rushing	Eugene Brazley	6 carries, 88 yards, 1 TD
Ole Miss	Receiving	Cody Core	2 receptions, 80 yards, 1 TD

=== Fresno State ===
Uniform Combination
Helmet	Jersey	Pants

Fresno State Bulldogs (1–0) at No. 17 Ole Miss Rebels (1–0)

Quarter	1	2	3	4	Total
Bulldogs	0	14	7	0	21
No. 17 Rebels	28	7	21	17	73

at Vaught–Hemingway Stadium • Oxford, Mississippi

- Date: September 12
- Game time: 2:30 p.m. CDT
- Game weather: Partly Cloudy • Temperature: 73 °F (23 °C)
- Game attendance: 60,302
- Referee: John McDaid
- TV announcers (ESPN2): Adam Amin (play-by-play), Kelly Stouffer (color), and Olivia Harlan (sideline)
- Recap

Game information

First Quarter

- (11:56) Ole Miss – Cody Core 14 yard pass from Chad Kelly (Gary Wunderlich kick)
  Ole Miss 7–0; 11 plays, 85 yards, 3:04
- (8:26) Ole Miss – Chad Kelly 4 yard run (Gary Wunderlich kick)
  Ole Miss 14–0; 5 plays, 59 yards, 1:57
- (4:30) Ole Miss – Quincy Adeboyejo 16 yard pass from Chad Kelly (Gary Wunderlich kick)
  Ole Miss 21–0; 7 plays, 86 yards, 1:49
- (1:23) Ole Miss – Quincy Adeboyejo 50 yard pass from Chad Kelly (Gary Wunderlich kick)
  Ole Miss 28–0; 2 plays, 69 yards, 0:33

Second Quarter

- (6:43) Fresno State – Shannon Edwards 56 yard interception return (Kody Kroening kick)
  Ole Miss 28–7
- (4:15) Ole Miss – Quincy Adeboyejo 44 yard pass from Chad Kelly (Gary Wunderlich kick)
  Ole Miss 35–7; 8 plays, 75 yards, 2:28
- (0:00) Fresno State – Josiah Blandin 9 yard pass from Chason Virgil (Kody Kroening kick)
  Ole Miss 35–14; 10 plays, 82 yards, 4:07

Third Quarter

- (10:30) Ole Miss – Robert Nkemdiche 1 yard run (Gary Wunderlich kick)
  Ole Miss 42–14; 6 plays, 20 yards, 1:43
- (9:39) Ole Miss – Trae Elston 38 yard interception return (Gary Wunderlich kick)
  Ole Miss 49–14
- (4:50) Ole Miss – Akeem Judd 27 yard run (Gary Wunderlich kick)
  Ole Miss 56–14; 3 plays, 68 yards, 0:54
- (1:00) Frenso State – Marteze Waller 7 yard pass from Chason Virgil (Kody Kroening kick)
  Ole Miss 56–21; 9 plays, 75 yards, 3:50

Fourth Quarter

- (12:11) Ole Miss – Gary Wunderlich 37 yard field goal
  Ole Miss 59–21; 9 plays, 57 yards, 3:41
- (7:40) Ole Miss – Eugene Brazley 6 yard run (Gary Wunderlich kick)
  Ole Miss 66–21; 6 plays, 31 yards, 3:35
- (6:24) Ole Miss – Chief Brown 22 yard interception return (Andy Pappanastos kick)
  Ole Miss 73–21

Statistics	FRES	MISS
First downs	17	27
Total yards	316	607
Rushes/yards	52/163	35/215
Passing yards	153	392
Passing: Comp–Att–Int	15–24–3	26–37–1
Time of possession	34:42	25:18

Team	Category	Player	Statistics
Fresno State	Passing	Chason Virgil	12/18, 140 yards, 2 TD, 2 INT
Fresno State	Rushing	Marteze Waller	28 carries, 91 yards
Fresno State	Receiving	Da'Mari Scott	5 receptions, 67 yards
Ole Miss	Passing	Chad Kelly	20/25, 346 yards, 4 TD
Ole Miss	Rushing	Devante Kincade	4 carries, 48 yards
Ole Miss	Receiving	Quincy Adeboyejo	5 receptions, 120 yards, 3 TD

=== At No. 2 Alabama ===
Uniform Combination
Helmet	Jersey	Pants

No. 15 Ole Miss Rebels (2–0) at No. 2 Alabama Crimson Tide (2–0)

Quarter	1	2	3	4	Total
No. 15 Rebels	3	14	13	13	43
No. 2 Crimson Tide	0	10	7	20	37

at Bryant–Denny Stadium • Tuscaloosa, Alabama

- Date: September 19
- Game time: 8:15 p.m. CDT
- Game weather: Clear Skies • Temperature: 75 °F (24 °C)
- Game attendance: 101,821
- Referee: Tom Ritter
- TV announcers (ESPN): Chris Fowler (play-by-play), Kirk Herbstreit (color), and Heather Cox (sideline)

Game information

First Quarter

- (14:22) Ole Miss – Gary Wunderlich 32 yard field goal
  Ole Miss 3–0; 4 plays, 2 yards, 0:32

Second Quarter

- (11:52) Alabama – Adam Griffith 20 yard field goal
  Tied 3–3; 13 plays, 69 yards, 5:18
- (7:30) Ole Miss – Jordan Wilkins 1 yard run (Gary Wunderlich kick)
  Ole Miss 10–3; 6 plays, 26 yards, 2:33
- (6:43) Ole Miss – Chad Kelly 4 yard run (Gary Wunderlich kick)
  Ole Miss 17–3; 3 plays, 18 yards, 0:42
- (1:03) Alabama – Richard Mullaney 9 yard pass from Jake Coker (Adam Griffith kick)
  Ole Miss 17–10; 16 plays, 75 yards, 5:40

Third Quarter

- (12:53) Ole Miss – Quincy Adeboyejo 66 yard pass from Chad Kelly (Gary Wunderlich kick)
  Ole Miss 24–10; 5 plays, 87 yards, 2:07
- (7:54) Ole Miss – Gary Wunderlich 34 yard field goal
  Ole Miss 27–10; 9 plays, 49 yards, 2:06
- (3:57) Ole Miss – Gary Wunderlich 45 yard field goal
  Ole Miss 30–10; 7 plays, 51 yards, 2:53
- (1:33) Alabama – Jake Coker 3 yard run (Adam Griffith kick)
  Ole Miss 30–17; 9 plays, 69 yards, 2:24

Fourth Quarter

- (12:30) Alabama – ArDarius Stewart 8 yard pass from Jake Coker (Adam Griffith kick)
  Ole Miss 30–24; 6 plays, 46 yards, 2:23
- (11:45) Ole Miss – Cody Core 73 yard pass from Chad Kelly (Two-Point Pass Conversion Failed)
  Ole Miss 36–24; 2 plays, 82 yards, 0:45
- (10:02) Ole Miss – Laquon Treadwell 24 yard pass from Chad Kelly (Gary Wunderlich kick)
  Ole Miss 43–24; 2 plays, 31 yards, 0:55
- (6:36) Alabama – Derrick Henry 2 yard run (Two-Point Pass Conversion Failed)
  Ole Miss 43–30; 14 plays, 75 yards, 3:26
- (4:33) Alabama – Richard Mullaney 2 yard pass from Jake Coker (Adam Griffith kick)
  Ole Miss 43–37; 7 plays, 30 yards, 2:03

Statistics	MISS	ALA
First downs	16	29
Total yards	433	503
Rushes/yards	32/92	42/215
Passing yards	341	288
Passing: Comp–Att–Int	18–33–0	32–59–3
Time of possession	24:34	35:26

Team	Category	Player	Statistics
Ole Miss	Passing	Chad Kelly	18/33, 341 yards, 3 TD
Ole Miss	Rushing	Jordan Wilkins	7 carries, 39 yards, 1 TD
Ole Miss	Receiving	Cody Core	4 receptions, 123 yards, 1 TD
Alabama	Passing	Jake Coker	21/45, 201 yards, 3 TD, 2 INT
Alabama	Rushing	Derrick Henry	23 carries, 127 yards, 1 TD
Alabama	Receiving	ArDarius Stewart	8 receptions, 73 yards, 1 TD

=== Vanderbilt ===
Uniform Combination
Helmet	Jersey	Pants

Vanderbilt Commodores (1–2) at No. 3 Ole Miss Rebels (3–0)

Quarter	1	2	3	4	Total
Commodores	3	0	10	3	16
No. 3 Rebels	7	6	7	7	27

at Vaught–Hemingway Stadium • Oxford, MS

- Date: Saturday, September 26, 2015
- Game time: 6:00 p.m. CST
- Game weather: Cloudy • Temperature: 73 °F (23 °C)
- Game attendance: 60,654
- Referee: Matt Austin
- TV announcers (ESPNU):
  Allen Bestwick (play-by-play)
  Dan Hawkins (color)

Game information

First Quarter

- (3:25) Vanderbilt – Tommy Openshaw 28 yard field goal
  Vanderbilt 3–0; 19 plays, 73 yards, 7:17
- (2:13) Ole Miss – Damore'ea Stringfellow 20 yard pass from Chad Kelly (Gary Wunderlich kick)
  Ole Miss 7–3; 5 plays, 72 yards, 1:04

Second Quarter

- (5:19) Ole Miss – Gary Wunderlich 19 yard field goal
  Ole Miss 10–3; 15 plays, 78 yards, 4:18
- (1:52) Ole Miss – Gary Wunderlich 39 yard field goal
  Ole Miss 13–3; 6 plays, 37 yards, 1:55

Third Quarter

- (13:10) Vanderbilt – Tommy Openshaw 41 yard field goal
  Ole Miss 13–6; 7 plays, 50 yards, 1:43
- (7:39) Vanderbilt – Ralph Webb 7 yard pass from Johnny McCrary (Tommy Openshaw kick)
  Tied 13–13; 7 plays, 80 yards, 3:06
- (1:25) Ole Miss – Robert Nkemdiche 1 yard run (Gary Wunderlich kick)
  Ole Miss 20–13; 7 plays, 20 yards, 2:19

Fourth Quarter

- (12:12) Vanderbilt – Tommy Openshaw 34 yard field goal
  Ole Miss 20–16; 12 plays, 70 yards, 4:06
- (6:47) Ole Miss – Jaylen Walton 3 yard run (Gary Wunderlich kick)
  Ole Miss 27–16; 9 plays, 80 yards, 2:41

Statistics	VAN	MISS
First downs	21	29
Total yards	322	472
Rushes/yards	42/128	42/151
Passing yards	194	321
Passing: Comp–Att–Int	23–42–0	24–42–2
Time of possession	33:21	26:39

Team	Category	Player	Statistics
Vanderbilt	Passing	Johnny McCrary	23/42, 194 yards, 1 TD
Vanderbilt	Rushing	Ralph Webb	25 carries, 90 yards
Vanderbilt	Receiving	Steven Scheu	5 receptions, 57 yards
Ole Miss	Passing	Chad Kelly	24/42, 321 yards, 1 TD, 2 INT
Ole Miss	Rushing	Jaylen Walton	21 carries, 133 yards, 1 TD
Ole Miss	Receiving	Laquon Treadwell	8 receptions, 135 yards

=== At No. 25 Florida ===
Uniform Combination
Helmet	Jersey	Pants

No. 3 Ole Miss Rebels (4–0) at No. 25 Florida Gators (4–0)

Quarter	1	2	3	4	Total
No. 3 Rebels	0	0	3	7	10
No. 25 Gators	13	12	0	13	38

at Ben Hill Griffin Stadium • Gainesville, FL

- Date: Saturday, October 3, 2015
- Game time: 6:00 p.m. CST (7:00 p.m. local EST)
- Game weather: Cloudy • Temperature: 70 °F (21 °C)
- Game attendance: 90,585
- Referee: John McDaid
- TV announcers (ESPN):
  Brad Nessler (play-by-play)
  Todd Blackledge (color)
  Holly Rowe (sideline)

Game information

First Quarter

- (9:09) Florida – Demarcus Robinson 36 yard pass from Will Grier (Jorge Powell kick)
  Florida 7–0; 5 plays, 61 yards, 2:18
- (6:48) Florida – Jake McGee 2 yard pass from Will Grier (Jorge Powell kick missed)
  Florida 13–0; 5 plays, 24 yards, 1:56

Second Quarter

- (6:53) Florida – Brandon Powell 77 yard pass from Will Grier (Two-Point Pass Conversion Failed)
  Florida 19–0; 3 plays, 81 yards, 0:57
- (0:20) Florida – Antonio Callaway 15 yard pass from Will Grier (Two-Point Run Conversion Failed)
  Florida 25–0; 13 plays, 91 yards, 0:42

Third Quarter

- (5:25) Ole Miss – Gary Wunderlich 22 yard field goal
  Florida 25–3; 19 plays, 70 yards, 9:35

Fourth Quarter

- (12:46) Florida – Jorge Powell 31 yard field goal
  Florida 28–3; 7 plays, 37 yards, 3:32
- (6:39) Florida – Jorge Powell 22 yard field goal
  Florida 31–3; 4 plays, 0 yards, 2:20
- (6:20) Florida – Jordan Cronkite 1 yard run (Jorge Powell kick)
  Florida 38–3; 1 play, 1 yard, 0:03
- (4:04) Ole Miss – Markell Pack 7 yard pass from Chad Kelly (Gary Wunderlich kick)
  Florida 38–10; 7 plays, 75 yards, 2:16

Statistics	MISS	FLA
First downs	23	18
Total yards	328	355
Rushes/yards	33/69	34/84
Passing yards	259	271
Passing: Comp–Att–Int	26–40–1	24–29–0
Time of possession	28:10	31:50

Team	Category	Player	Statistics
Ole Miss	Passing	Chad Kelly	26/40, 259 yards, 1 TD, 1 INT
Ole Miss	Rushing	Chad Kelly	15 carries, 40 yards
Ole Miss	Receiving	Laquon Treadwell	5 receptions, 42 yards
Florida	Passing	Will Grier	24/29, 271 yards, 4 TD
Florida	Rushing	Kelvin Taylor	27 carries, 83 yards
Florida	Receiving	Demarcus Robinson	8 receptions, 98 yards, 1 TD

=== New Mexico State ===
Uniform Combination
Helmet	Jersey	Pants

New Mexico State Aggies (0–4) at No. 14 Ole Miss Rebels (4–1)

Quarter	1	2	3	4	Total
Aggies	3	0	0	0	3
No. 14 Rebels	17	14	14	7	52

at Vaught–Hemingway Stadium • Oxford, MS

- Date: Saturday, October 10, 2015
- Game time: 11:00 a.m. CST
- Game weather: Cloudy • Temperature: 63 °F (17 °C)
- Game attendance: 60,154
- Referee: Matt Loeffler
- TV announcers (SECN):
  Tom Hart (play-by-play)
  Andre Ware (color)
  Laura Rutledge (sideline)

Game information

First Quarter

- (11:25) Ole Miss – Gary Wunderlich 21 yard field goal
  Ole Miss 3–0; 12 plays, 60 yards, 3:35
- (4:24) New Mexico State – Parker Davidson 39 yard field goal
  Tied 3–3; 15 plays, 67 yards, 6:54
- (3:03) Ole Miss – Jordan Wilkins 11 yard run (Gary Wunderlich kick)
  Ole Miss 10–3; 5 plays, 65 yards, 1:21
- (0:00) Ole Miss – Akeem Judd 3 yard run (Gary Wunderlich kick)
  Ole Miss 17–3; 6 plays, 57 yards, 1:33

Second Quarter

- (5:58) Ole Miss – Markell Pack 66 yard pass from Chad Kelly (Gary Wunderlich kick)
  Ole Miss 24–3; 2 plays, 69 yards, 0:32
- (1:18) Ole Miss – Chad Kelly 4 yard run (Gary Wunderlich kick)
  Ole Miss 31–3; 8 plays, 78 yards, 1:21

Third Quarter

- (5:25) Ole Miss – Laquon Treadwell 20 yard pass from Chad Kelly (Gary Wunderlich kick)
  Ole Miss 38–3; 8 plays, 80 yards, 2:55
- (0:25) Ole Miss – Laquon Treadwell 37 yard pass from Chad Kelly (Gary Wunderlich kick)
  Ole Miss 45–3; 9 plays, 68 yards, 2:27

Fourth Quarter

- (2:26) Ole Miss – Eugene Brazley 78 yard run (Gary Wunderlich kick)
  Ole Miss 52–3; 5 plays, 68 yards, 2:20

Statistics	NMSU	MISS
First downs	18	31
Total yards	239	665
Rushes/yards	37/98	34/265
Passing yards	141	400
Passing: Comp–Att–Int	22–37–2	25–35–1
Time of possession	36:46	23:14

Team	Category	Player	Statistics
New Mexico State	Passing	Nick Jeanty	12/23, 86 yards
New Mexico State	Rushing	Xavier Hall	9 carries, 31 yards
New Mexico State	Receiving	Teldrick Morgan	5 receptions, 33 yards
Ole Miss	Passing	Chad Kelly	24/33, 384 yards, 3 TD, 1 INT
Ole Miss	Rushing	Eugene Brazley	6 carries, 98 yards, 1 TD
Ole Miss	Receiving	Laquon Treadwell	8 receptions, 136 yards, 2 TD

=== At Memphis ===
Uniform Combination
Helmet	Jersey	Pants

No. 13 Ole Miss Rebels (5–1) at Memphis Tigers (5–0)

Quarter	1	2	3	4	Total
No. 13 Rebels	14	0	10	0	24
Tigers	7	17	7	6	37

at Liberty Bowl Memorial Stadium • Memphis, TN

- Date: Saturday, October 17, 2015
- Game time: 11:00 a.m. CST
- Game weather: Sunny • Temperature: 57 °F (14 °C)
- Game attendance: 60,241
- Referee: Brad Rogers
- TV announcers (ABC/ESPN2):
  Tom Hart (play-by-play)
  Andre Ware (color)
  Laura Rutledge (sideline)

Game information

First Quarter

- (14:40) Ole Miss – Quincy Adeboyejo 68 yard pass from Laquon Treadwell (Gary Wunderlich kick)
  Ole Miss 7–0; 2 plays, 75 yards, 0:20
- (9:44) Ole Miss – Damore'ea Stringfellow 23 yard pass from Chad Kelly (Gary Wunderlich kick)
  Ole Miss 14–0; 8 plays, 90 yards, 2:33
- (2:12) Memphis – Alan Cross 1 yard pass from Paxton Lynch (Jake Elliott kick)
  Ole Miss 14–7; 10 plays, 70 yards, 3:24

Second Quarter

- (3:49) Memphis – Jake Elliott 23 yard field goal
  Ole Miss 14–10; 7 plays, 35 yards, 2:45
- (2:52) Memphis – Sam Craft 4 yard run (Jake Elliott kick)
  Memphis 17–14; 3 plays, 30 yards, 0:48
- (0:34) Memphis – Anthony Miller 6 yard pass from Paxton Lynch (Jake Elliott kick)
  Memphis 24–14; 6 plays, 34 yards, 1:22

Third Quarter

- (11:31) Memphis – Mose Frazier 31 yard pass from Paxton Lynch
  Memphis 31–14; 10 plays, 82 yards, 3:23
- (6:59) Ole Miss – Laquon Treadwell 6 yard pass from Chad Kelly
  Memphis 31–21; 5 plays, 68 yards, 1:04
- (0:16) Ole Miss – Gary Wunderlich 24 yard field goal
  Memphis 31–24; 12 plays, 77 yards, 3:44

Fourth Quarter

- (9:44) Memphis – Jake Elliott 42 yard field goal
  Memphis 34–24; 9 plays, 36 yards, 2:48
- (0:55) Memphis – Jake Elliott 27 yard field goal
  Memphis 37–24; 16 plays, 70 yards, 7:57

Statistics	MISS	MEM
First downs	25	31
Total yards	480	491
Rushes/yards	24/40	41/107
Passing yards	440	384
Passing: Comp–Att–Int	34–48–2	39–53–1
Time of possession	22:32	37:28

Team	Category	Player	Statistics
Ole Miss	Passing	Chad Kelly	33/47, 372 yards, 2 TD, 2 INT
Ole Miss	Rushing	Jaylen Walton	7 carries, 39 yards
Ole Miss	Receiving	Laquon Treadwell	14 receptions, 144 yards, 1 TD
Memphis	Passing	Paxton Lynch	39/53, 384 yards, 3 TD, 1 INT
Memphis	Rushing	Jarvis Cooper	17 carries, 76 yards
Memphis	Receiving	Anthony Miller	10 receptions, 132 yards, 1 TD

=== No. 15 Texas A&M ===
Uniform Combination
Helmet	Jersey	Pants

No. 15 Texas A&M Aggies (5–1) at No. 24 Ole Miss Rebels (5–2)

Quarter	1	2	3	4	Total
No. 15 Aggies	0	3	0	0	3
No. 24 Rebels	7	9	7	0	23

at Vaught–Hemingway Stadium • Oxford, MS

- Date: Saturday, October 24, 2015
- Game time: 6:00 p.m. CST
- Game weather: Cloudy • Temperature: 73 °F (23 °C)
- Game attendance: 60,674
- Referee: Ken Williamson
- TV announcers (ESPN):
  Brad Nessler (play-by-play)
  Todd Blackledge (color)
  Holly Rowe (sideline)

Game information

First Quarter

- (2:33) Ole Miss – Evan Engram 7 yard pass from Chad Kelly (Gary Wunderlick kick)
  Ole Miss 7–0; 6 plays, 79 yards, 1:57

Second Quarter

- (11:36) Ole Miss – Gary Wunderlich 41 yard field goal
  Ole Miss 10–0; 11 plays, 69 yards, 3:18
- (7:05) Ole Miss – Gary Wunderlich 30 yard field goal
  Ole Miss 13–0; 7 plays, 24 yards, 2:26
- (2:27) Texas A&M – Taylor Bertolet 44 yard field goal
  Ole Miss 13–3; 4 plays, 7 yards, 1:37
- (0:00) Ole Miss – Gary Wunderlich 22 yard field goal
  Ole Miss 16–3; 5 plays, 20 yards, 1:12

Third Quarter

- (9:16) Ole Miss – Laquon Treadwell 58 yard pass from Chad Kelly (Gary Wunderlich kick)
  Ole Miss 23–3; 4 plays, 70 yards, 0:43

Fourth Quarter

- No scoring plays

Statistics	TA&M	MISS
First downs	12	28
Total yards	192	471
Rushes/yards	27/58	51/230
Passing yards	134	241
Passing: Comp–Att–Int	18–45–1	26–41–3
Time of possession	24:12	35:48

Team	Category	Player	Statistics
Texas A&M	Passing	Kyle Allen	12/34, 88 yards, 1 INT
Texas A&M	Rushing	Tra Carson	14 carries, 48 yards
Texas A&M	Receiving	Ricky Seals-Jones	3 receptions, 75 yards
Ole Miss	Passing	Chad Kelly	26/41, 241 yards, 2 TD, 3 INT
Ole Miss	Rushing	Jaylen Walton	22 carries, 97 yards
Ole Miss	Receiving	Laquon Treadwell	5 receptions, 102 yards, 1 TD

=== At Auburn ===
Uniform Combination
Helmet	Jersey	Pants

No. 19 Ole Miss Rebels (6–2) at Auburn Tigers (4–3)

Quarter	1	2	3	4	Total
No. 19 Rebels	3	7	10	7	27
Tigers	3	7	3	6	19

at Jordan–Hare Stadium • Auburn, AL

- Date: Saturday, October 31, 2015
- Game time: 11:00 a.m. CST
- Game weather: Cloudy • Temperature: 65 °F (18 °C)
- Game attendance: 87,451
- Referee: Matt Loeffler
- TV announcers (ESPN):
  Dave Pasch (play-by-play)
  Brian Griese (color)
  Tom Luginbill (sideline)

Game information

First Quarter

- (8:30) Ole Miss – Gary Wunderlich 27 yard field goal
  Ole Miss 3–0; 12 plays, 72 yards, 4:26
- (3:52) Auburn – Daniel Carson 52 yard field goal
  Tied 3–3; 4 plays, 4 yards, 1:03

Second Quarter

- (14:11) Auburn – Ricardo Louis 47 yard pass from Sean White (Daniel Carson kick)
  Auburn 10–3; 5 plays, 74 yards, 1:39
- (3:59) Ole Miss – Akeem Judd 25 yard run (Gary Wunderlich kick)
  Tied 10–10; 6 plays, 49 yards, 2:07

Third Quarter

- (12:20) Ole Miss – Gary Wunderlich 37 yard field goal
  Ole Miss 13–10; 9 plays, 55 yards, 2:40
- (3:46) Auburn – Daniel Carson 23 yard field goal
  Tied 13–13; 9 plays, 89 yards, 4:00
- (1:25) Ole Miss – Derrick Jones 45 yard pass from Chad Kelly (Gary Wunderlich kick)
  Ole Miss 20–13; 5 plays, 75 yards, 1:52

Fourth Quarter

- (14:34) Auburn – Daniel Carson 33 yard field goal
  Ole Miss 20–16; 10 plays, 59 yards, 2:20
- (12:00) Auburn – Daniel Carson 26 yard field goal
  Ole Miss 20–19; 5 plays, 38 yards, 1:37
- (10:13) Ole Miss – Laquon Treadwell 21 yard pass from Chad Kelly (Gary Wunderlich kick)
  Ole Miss 27–19; 6 plays, 75 yards, 1:47

Statistics	MISS	AUB
First downs	27	18
Total yards	558	427
Rushes/yards	39/156	41/125
Passing yards	402	302
Passing: Comp–Att–Int	34–52–2	13–32–1
Time of possession	33:30	26:30

Team	Category	Player	Statistics
Ole Miss	Passing	Chad Kelly	33/51, 381 yards, 2 TD, 2 INT
Ole Miss	Rushing	Jaylen Walton	20 carries, 78 yards
Ole Miss	Receiving	Laquon Treadwell	7 receptions, 14 yards, 1 TD
Auburn	Passing	Sean White	12/28, 258 yards, 1 TD, 1 INT
Auburn	Rushing	Jovon Robinson	18 carries, 91 yards
Auburn	Receiving	Ricardo Louis	4 receptions, 137 yards, 1 TD

=== Arkansas ===
Uniform Combination
Helmet	Jersey	Pants

Arkansas Razorbacks (4–4) at No. 18 Ole Miss Rebels (7–2)

Quarter	1	2	3	4	OT	Total
Razorbacks	7	10	14	14	8	53
No. 18 Rebels	7	10	14	14	7	52

at Vaught–Hemingway Stadium • Oxford, MS

- Date: Saturday, November 7, 2015
- Game time: 2:30 p.m. CST
- Game weather: Light Rain • Temperature: 55 °F (13 °C)
- Game attendance: 60,680
- Referee: Tom Ritter
- TV announcers (CBS):
  Carter Blackburn (play-by-play)
  Aaron Taylor (color)
  Jenny Dell (sideline)

Game information

First Quarter

- (4:46) Arkansas – Drew Morgan 31 yard pass from Brandon Allen (Cole Hedlund kick)
  Arkansas 7–0; 6 plays, 73 yards, 3:12
- (1:32) Ole Miss – Jaylen Walton 3 yard run (Gary Wunderlich kick)
  Tied 7–7; 9 plays, 77 yards, 3:14

Second Quarter

- (7:28) Arkansas – Dominique Reed 15 yard pass from Brandon Allen (Cole Hedlund kick)
  Arkansas 14–7; 10 plays, 59 yards, 5:23
- (5:05) Ole Miss – Chad Kelly 11 yard run (Gary Wunderlich kick)
  Tied 14–14; 9 plays, 78 yards, 2:23
- (0:43) Arkansas – Cole Hedlund 45 yard field goal
  Arkansas 17–14; 9 plays, 47 yards, 4:22
- (0:00) Ole Miss – Gary Wunderlich 37 yard field goal
  Tied 17–17; 5 plays, 55 yards, 0:43

Third Quarter

- (13:09) Ole Miss – Damore'ea Stringfellow 23 yard pasas from Chad Kelly (Gary Wunderlich kick)
  Ole Miss 24–17; 6 plays, 60 yards, 1:51
- (9:13) Arkansas – Jared Cornelius 30 yard pass from Brandon Allen (Cole Hedlund kick)
  Tied 24–24; 7 plays, 82 yards, 3:56
- (7:38) Ole Miss – Chad Kelly 3 yard run (Gary Wunderlich kick)
  Ole Miss 31–24; 6 plays, 75 yards, 1:35
- (2:14) Arkansas – Kody Walker 3 yard run (Cole Hedlund kick)
  Tied 31–31; 11 plays, 83 yards, 5:24

Fourth Quarter

- (12:20) Arkansas – Drew Morgan 10 yard pass from Brandon Allen (Cole Hedlund kick)
  Arkansas 38–31; 7 plays, 72 yards, 3:06
- (10:30) Ole Miss – Laquon Treadwell 17 yard pass from Chad Kelly (Gary Wunderlich kick)
  Tied 38–38; 6 plays, 83 yards, 1:50
- (4:55) Ole Miss – Quincy Adeboyejo 18 yard pass from Chad Kelly (Gary Wunderlich kick)
  Ole Miss 45–38; 6 plays, 81 yards, 2:34
- (0:53) Arkansas – Dominique Reed 17 yard pass from Brandon Allen (Cole Hedlund kick)
  Tied 45–45; 8 plays, 75 yards, 4:02

Overtime

- Ole Miss – Chad Kelly 8 yard run (Gary Wunderlich kick)
  Ole Miss 52–45; 3 plays, 25 yards
- Arkansas – Drew Morgan 9 yard pass from Brandon Allen (Brandon Allen Run for Two-Point Conversion)
  Arkansas 53–52; 6 plays, 25 yards

Statistics	ARK	MISS
First downs	35	31
Total yards	605	590
Rushes/yards	39/163	32/222
Passing yards	442	368
Passing: Comp–Att–Int	33–45–0	24–34–0
Time of possession	41:03	18:57

Team	Category	Player	Statistics
Arkansas	Passing	Brandon Allen	33/45, 442 yards, 6 TD
Arkansas	Rushing	Alex Collins	17 carries, 108 yards
Arkansas	Receiving	Drew Morgan	9 receptions, 122 yards, 3 TD
Ole Miss	Passing	Chad Kelly	24/34, 368 yards, 3 TD
Ole Miss	Rushing	Chad Kelly	11 carries, 110 yards, 3 TD
Ole Miss	Receiving	Laquon Treadwell	7 receptions, 132 yards, 1 TD

=== No. 15 LSU ===
Uniform Combination
Helmet	Jersey	Pants

No. 15 LSU Tigers (7–2) at No. 22 Ole Miss Rebels (7–3)

Quarter	1	2	3	4	Total
No. 15 Tigers	0	7	10	0	17
No. 22 Rebels	3	21	14	0	38

at Vaught–Hemingway Stadium • Oxford, MS

- Date: Saturday, November 21, 2015
- Game time: 2:30 p.m. CST
- Game weather: Cloudy • Temperature: 51 °F (11 °C)
- Game attendance: 60,705
- Referee: Ken Williamson
- TV announcers (CBS):
  Verne Lundquist (play-by-play)
  Gary Danielson (color)
  Allie LaForce (sideline)

Game information

First Quarter

- (12:41) Ole Miss – Gary Wunderlich 32 yard field goal
  Ole Miss 3–0; 5 plays, 66 yards, 2:19

Second Quarter

- (12:30) Ole Miss – Jaylen Walton 2 yard run (Gary Wunderlich kick)
  Ole Miss 10–0; 8 plays, 80 yards, 2:23
- (7:13) Ole Miss – Chad Kelly 5 yard run (Gary Wunderlich kick)
  Ole Miss 17–0; 10 plays, 70 yards, 2:36
- (3:24) Ole Miss – Laquon Treadwell 11 yard pass from Chad Kelly (Gary Wunderlich kick)
  Ole Miss 24–0; 1 play, 11 yards, 0:06
- (1:14) LSU – Tyron Johnson 39 yard pass from Brandon Harris (Trent Domingue kick)
  Ole Miss 24–7; 6 plays, 75 yards, 2:10

Third Quarter

- (12:54) LSU – Trent Domingue 43 yard field goal
  Ole Miss 24–10; 6 plays, 54 yards, 2:06
- (10:04) LSU – William Clapp 0 yard fumble recovery (Trent Domingue kick)
  Ole Miss 24–17
- (7:34) Ole Miss – Chad Kelly 11 yard run (Gary Wunderlich kick)
  Ole Miss 31–17; 7 plays, 83 yards, 2:30
- (3:32) Ole Miss – Evan Engram 36 yard pass from Chad Kelly (Gary Wunderlich kick)
  Ole Miss 38–17; 6 plays, 57 yards, 2:15

Fourth Quarter

- No scoring plays

Statistics	LSU	MISS
First downs	25	21
Total yards	508	432
Rushes/yards	38/184	31/152
Passing yards	324	280
Passing: Comp–Att–Int	26–51–2	19–34–0
Time of possession	36:15	23:45

Team	Category	Player	Statistics
LSU	Passing	Brandon Harris	26/51, 324 yards, 1 TD, 2 INT
LSU	Rushing	Leonard Fournette	25 carries, 108 yards
LSU	Receiving	Tyron Johnson	5 receptions, 83 yards, 1 TD
Ole Miss	Passing	Chad Kelly	19/34, 280 yards, 2 TD
Ole Miss	Rushing	Chad Kelly	12 carries, 81 yards, 2 TD
Ole Miss	Receiving	Quincy Adeboyejo	2 receptions, 62 yards

=== At No. 21 Mississippi State ===
Uniform Combination
Helmet	Jersey	Pants

No. 18 Ole Miss Rebels (8–3) at No. 21 Mississippi State Bulldogs (8–3)

Quarter	1	2	3	4	Total
No. 18 Rebels	21	7	3	7	38
No. 21 Bulldogs	0	3	10	14	27

at Davis Wade Stadium • Starkville, MS

- Date: Saturday, November 28, 2015
- Game time: 6:15 p.m. CST
- Game weather: Clear Skies • Temperature: 68 °F (20 °C)
- Game attendance: 62,265
- Referee: John McDaid
- TV announcers (ESPN2):
  Mark Jones (play-by-play)
  Rod Gilmore (color)
  Quint Kessenich (sideline)

Game information

First Quarter

- (11:09) Ole Miss – Chad Kelly 27 yard run (Gary Wunderlich kick)
  Ole Miss 7–0; 4 plays, 62 yards, 1:14
- (5:10) Ole Miss – Damore'ea Stringfellow 2 yard pass from Chad Kelly (Gary Wunderlich kick)
  Ole Miss 14–0; 9 plays, 68 yards, 4:16
- (3:05) Ole Miss – Tony Bridges 45 yard interception return (Gary Wunderlich kick)
  Ole Miss 21–0

Second Quarter

- (14:17) Mississippi State – Westin Graves 22 yard field goal
  Ole Miss 21–3; 9 plays, 58 yards, 3:48
- (10:45) Ole Miss – Damore'ea Stringfellow 36 yard pass from Chad Kelly (Gary Wunderlich kick)
  Ole Miss 28–3; 8 plays, 75 yards, 3:32

Third Quarter

- (11:54) Mississippi State – Dak Prescott 1 yard run (Westin Graves kick)
  Ole Miss 28–10; 5 plays, 46 yards, 1:50
- (5:42) Mississippi State – Westin Graves 27 yard field goal
  Ole Miss 28–13; 12 plays, 70 yards, 2:23
- (2:45) Ole Miss – Gary Wunderlich 48 yard field goal
  Ole Miss 31–13; 7 plays, 44 yards, 2:57

Fourth Quarter

- (13:22) Ole Miss – Jordan Wilkins 38 yard run (Gary Wunderlich kick)
  Ole Miss 38–13; 7 plays, 65 yards, 2:40
- (9:38) Mississippi State – Malik Dear 13 yard pass from Dak Prescott (Westin Graves kick)
  Ole Miss 38–20; 9 plays, 75 yards, 3:44
- (1:17) Mississippi State – Malik Dear 7 yard pass from Dak Prescott (Westin Graves kick)
  Ole Miss 38–27; 10 plays, 64 yards, 3:43

Statistics	MISS	MSST
First downs	26	21
Total yards	479	402
Rushes/yards	37/243	34/148
Passing yards	236	254
Passing: Comp–Att–Int	21–30–0	31–42–1
Time of possession	30:26	29:34

Team	Category	Player	Statistics
Ole Miss	Passing	Chad Kelly	21/30, 236 yards, 2 TD
Ole Miss	Rushing	Jaylen Walton	16 carries, 93 yards
Ole Miss	Receiving	Damore'ea Stringfellow	5 receptions, 84 yards, 2 TD
Mississippi State	Passing	Dak Prescott	31/42, 254 yards, 2 TD, 1 INT
Mississippi State	Rushing	Dak Prescott	21 carries, 63 yards, 1 TD
Mississippi State	Receiving	Fred Ross	12 receptions, 117 yards

=== Vs. No. 16 Oklahoma State ===
Uniform Combination
Helmet	Jersey	Pants

No. 16 Oklahoma State Cowboys (10–2) vs. No. 12 Ole Miss Rebels (9–3)

Quarter	1	2	3	4	Total
No. 16 Cowboys	3	3	7	7	20
No. 12 Rebels	10	24	7	7	48

at Caesars Superdome • New Orleans, LA

- Date: Friday, January 1, 2016
- Game time: 7:30 p.m. CST
- Game weather: None (indoor stadium)
- Game attendance: 72,117
- Referee: Ken Williamson
- TV announcers (ESPN):
  Bob Wischusen (play-by-play)
  Brock Huard (color)
  Shannon Spake (sideline)

Game information

First Quarter

- (4:52) Oklahoma State – Ben Grogan 26 yard field goal
  Oklahoma State 3–0; 7 plays, 29 yards, 3:01
- (2:15) Ole Miss – Gary Wunderlich 34 yard field goal
  Tied 3–3; 7 plays, 57 yards, 2:37
- (0:20) Ole Miss – Cody Core 31 yard pass from Chad Kelly (Gary Wunderlich kick)
  Ole Miss 10–3; 3 plays, 58 yards, 0:39

Second Quarter

- (11:28) Ole Miss – Laquon Treadwell 34 yard pass from Chad Kelly (Gary Wunderlich kick)
  Ole Miss 17–3; 6 plays, 51 yards, 2:01
- (6:58) Ole Miss – Laquon Treadwell 10 yard pass from Chad Kelly (Gary Wunderlich kick)
  Ole Miss 24–3; 5 plays, 85 yards, 1:36
- (3:24) Ole Miss – Gary Wunderlich 38 yard field goal
  Ole Miss 27–3; 8 plays, 55 yards, 2:04
- (1:22) Oklahoma State – Ben Grogan 31 yard field goal
  Ole Miss 27–6; 10 plays, 61 yards, 2:17
- (0:00) Ole Miss – Laremy Tunsil 2 yard run (Gary Wunderlich kick)
  Ole Miss 34–6; 8 plays, 74 yards, 1:22

Third Quarter

- (4:26) Ole Miss – Jordan Wilkins 36 yard run (Gary Wunderlich kick)
  Ole Miss 41–6; 2 plays, 40 yards, 0:44
- (1:11) Oklahoma State – J.W. Walsh 2 yard run (Ben Grogan kick)
  Ole Miss 41–13; 9 plays, 75 yards, 3:15

Fourth Quarter

- (13:04) Ole Miss – Laquon Treadwell 14 yard pass from Chad Kelly (Gary Wunderlich kick)
  Ole Miss 48–13; 8 plays, 71 yards, 3:07
- (3:03) Oklahoma State – J.W. Walsh 8 yard run (Ben Grogan kick)
  Ole Miss 48–20; 5 plays, 54 yards, 2:25

Statistics	OSU	MISS
First downs	20	28
Total yards	366	554
Rushes/yards	30/63	37/207
Passing yards	303	347
Passing: Comp–Att–Int	27–45–0	22–35–1
Time of possession	31:53	28:07

Team	Category	Player	Statistics
Oklahoma State	Passing	Mason Rudolph	18/31, 179 yards
Oklahoma State	Rushing	J.W. Walsh	10 carries, 74 yards, 2 TD
Oklahoma State	Receiving	Marcell Ateman	5 receptions, 70 yards
Ole Miss	Passing	Chad Kelly	21/33, 302 yards, 4 TD, 1 INT
Ole Miss	Rushing	Chad Kelly	10 carries, 73 yards
Ole Miss	Receiving	Evan Engram	6 receptions, 96 yards

== Cumulative Season Statistics ==
=== Cumulative Team Statistics ===
Category	Ole Miss	Opponents
First downs - Avg. per game	341 - 26.23	278 - 21.38
Points - Avg. per game	531 - 40.85	294 - 22.62
Total plays/yards - Avg. per game	952/6731 (7.07 yards/play) - 73.32/517.77	1029/5016 (5.51 yards/play) - 79.15/385.85
Passing yards - Avg. per game	4351 - 334.69	3364 - 258.77
Rushes/yards (net) - Avg. per game	463/2380 - 35.62/183.08 (5.14 yards/carry)	496/1652 - 38.15/127.08 (3.33 yards/carry)
Passing (Att-Comp-Int)	489-318-14 (65.03% completion)	533-319-15 (59.85% completion)
Sacks - Avg. per game	29 - 2.23	19 - 1.46
Penalties–yards - Avg. per game	79–702 - 6.08–54	87–695 - 6.69–53.46
3rd down conversions	70/169 (41.42%)	88/226 (38.94%)
4th down conversions	7/15 (46.67%)	7/23 (30.43%)
Time of possession - Avg. per game	5:44:51 - 26:32	7:15:09 - 33:28

=== Cumulative Player Statistics ===
Category	Player	Statistics - Avg. per game
Leading Passer	Chad Kelly	298/458 (65.07% completion), 4042 yards, 31 TD, 13 INT - 22.92/35.23, 310.92 yards, 2.38 TD, 1 INT
Leading Rusher	Jaylen Walton	142 carries, 730 yards, 5 TD - 10.92 carries, 56.15 yards (5.14 yards/carry), 0.38 TD
Leading Receiver	Laquon Treadwell	82 receptions, 1153 yards, 11 TD - 6.31 receptions, 88.69 yards, 0.85 TD

== Rankings ==
Ranking movements Legend: ██ Increase in ranking ██ Decrease in ranking — = Not ranked RV = Received votes ( ) = First-place votes
	Week															
Poll	Pre	1	2	3	4	5	6	7	8	9	10	11	12	13	14	Final
AP	17	17	15	3 (11)	3 (10)	14	13	24	19	19	RV	25	19	16	16	10
Coaches	15	14	11	5	5 (1)	13	12	23	21	19	RV	25	19	17	15	9
CFP	Not released									18	—	22	18	13	12	Not released
