= 2015 Mississippi State Bulldogs football team =

American college football season

2015 Mississippi State Bulldogs football

Belk Bowl champion

Belk Bowl, W 51–28 vs. NC State
- Conference: Southeastern Conference
- Western Division
- Record: 9–4 (4–4 SEC)
- Head coach: Dan Mullen (7th season)
- Co-offensive coordinators: Billy Gonzales (2nd season); John Hevesy (2nd season)
- Offensive scheme: Spread option
- Defensive coordinator: Manny Diaz (2nd season)
- Base defense: 4–3
- Home stadium: Davis Wade Stadium

2015 Southeastern Conference football standings
	Conf.			Overall
Team	W		L	W		L
Eastern Division
No. 25 Florida x	7	–	1	10	–	4
No. 22 Tennessee	5	–	3	9	–	4
Georgia	5	–	3	10	–	3
Vanderbilt	2	–	6	4	–	8
Kentucky	2	–	6	5	–	7
Missouri*	1	–	7	5	–	7
South Carolina	1	–	7	3	–	9
Western Division
No. 1 Alabama x$#^	7	–	1	14	–	1
No. 10 Ole Miss	6	–	2	10	–	3
Arkansas	5	–	3	8	–	5
No. 16 LSU *	5	–	3	9	–	3
Texas A&M	4	–	4	8	–	5
Mississippi State	4	–	4	9	–	4
Auburn	2	–	6	7	–	6
Championship: Alabama 29, Florida 15
# – College Football Playoff champion; ^ – College Football Playoff participant; $ – Conference champion; x – Division champion/co-champions; * LSU and Missouri vacated all wins due to NCAA violations.; Rankings from AP Poll

The 2015 Mississippi State Bulldogs football team represented Mississippi State University in the 2015 NCAA Division I FBS football season. The Bulldogs played their home games at Davis Wade Stadium in Starkville, Mississippi and competed in the Western Division of the Southeastern Conference (SEC). They were led by seventh-year head coach Dan Mullen. The Bulldogs finished the season 9–4, having won the 2015 Belk Bowl.

== Schedule ==
Date	Time	Opponent	Rank	Site	TV	Result	Attendance
September 5	9:00 p.m.	at Southern Miss*		M. M. Roberts Stadium; Hattiesburg, MS	FS1	W 34–16	36,641
September 12	8:15 p.m.	No. 14 LSU	No. 25	Davis Wade Stadium; Starkville, MS (rivalry)	ESPN	L 19–21	62,531
September 19	3:00 p.m.	Northwestern State*		Davis Wade Stadium; Starkville, MS	SECN	W 62–13	61,574
September 26	6:30 p.m.	at Auburn		Jordan–Hare Stadium; Auburn, AL	ESPN2	W 17–9	87,451
October 3	6:30 p.m.	at No. 14 Texas A&M	No. 21	Kyle Field; College Station, TX	SECN	L 17–30	104,455
October 10	3:00 p.m.	Troy*		Davis Wade Stadium; Starkville, MS	SECN	W 45–17	60,866
October 17	11:00 a.m.	Louisiana Tech*^{†}		Davis Wade Stadium; Starkville, MS	SECN	W 45–20	61,651
October 24	6:30 p.m.	Kentucky		Davis Wade Stadium; Starkville, MS	SECN	W 42–16	61,168
November 5	8:00 p.m.	at Missouri	No. 20	Faurot Field; Columbia, MO (SEC Nation)	ESPN	W 31–13	58,878
November 14	2:30 p.m.	No. 2 Alabama	No. 17	Davis Wade Stadium; Starkville, MS (rivalry / SEC Nation)	CBS	L 6–31	62,435
November 21	6:00 p.m.	at Arkansas		Donald W. Reynolds Razorback Stadium; Fayetteville, AR	ESPN	W 51–50	71,936
November 28	6:15 p.m.	No. 18 Ole Miss	No. 21	Davis Wade Stadium; Starkville, MS (Egg Bowl)	ESPN2	L 27–38	62,265
December 30	2:30 p.m.	vs. NC State*		Bank of America Stadium; Charlotte, NC (Belk Bowl)	ESPN	W 51–28	45,423
*Non-conference game; ^{†}Homecoming; Rankings from AP Poll and CFP Rankings after November 3 released prior to game; All times are in Central time

Schedule source:

== Rankings ==
Ranking movements Legend: ██ Increase in ranking ██ Decrease in ranking — = Not ranked RV = Received votes
	Week															
Poll	Pre	1	2	3	4	5	6	7	8	9	10	11	12	13	14	Final
AP	RV	25	RV	RV	21	RV	RV	RV	25	24	20	RV	23	RV	RV	RV
Coaches	RV	RV	RV	RV	22	RV	RV	RV	RV	25	20	25	22	RV	RV	RV
CFP	Not released									20	17	—	21	—	—	Not released

== Game summaries ==
=== Southern Miss ===
Mississippi State at Southern Miss

Team	1	2	3	4	Total
• Bulldogs	7	7	13	7	34
Golden Eagles	10	0	3	3	16

- Date: September 5
- Location: M. M. Roberts Stadium
  Hattiesburg, MS
- Game start: 9:00 p.m. CDT
- Elapsed time: 3:25
- Game attendance: 36,641
- Game weather: 81 °F (27 °C), Rain, winds 11mph
- Referee: David Smith
- TV announcers (Fox Sports 1): Tim Brando (Play-by-Play), Spencer Tillman (Color)

Scoring summary
1	5:39	USM	S. Brauchle 31-yard kick good	USM 3–0
1	5:26	MSU	Brandon Holloway 100-yard kickoff return, Westin Graves kick good	MSU 7–3
1	2:20	USM	J. Washington 19-yard touchdown pass from Nick Mullens, S. Brauchle kick good	USM 10–7
2	10:57	MSU	Justin Johnson 5-yard touchdown pass from Dak Prescott, Westin Graves kick good	MSU 14–10
3	12:15	MSU	Gus Walley 4-yard touchdown pass from Dak Prescott, Westin Graves kick good	MSU 21–10
3	10:36	MSU	Westin Graves 38-yard kick good	MSU 24–10
3	8:37	USM	S. Brauchle 27-yard kick good	MSU 24–13
3	4:02	MSU	Westin Graves 37-yard kick good	MSU 27–13
4	13:01	USM	S. Brauchle 27-yard kick good	MSU 27–16
4	5:55	MSU	Dak Prescott 7-yard touchdown run, Westin Graves kick good	MSU 34–16

=== LSU ===
#14 LSU at #25 Mississippi State

Team	1	2	3	4	Total
• Tigers	14	0	7	0	21
Bulldogs	0	3	3	13	19

- Date: September 12
- Location: Davis Wade Stadium
  Starkville, MS
- Game start: 8:15 p.m. CDT
- Elapsed time: 3:30
- Game attendance: 62,531
- Game weather: 64 °F (18 °C), Clear skies, winds NW 5mph
- Referee: Hubert Owens
- TV announcers (ESPN): Dave Pasch (Play-by-Play), Brian Griese (color), Tom Luginbill (Sideline Reporter)

Scoring summary
1	4:37	LSU	Leonard Fournette 1-yard touchdown run, Trent Domingue kick good	LSU 7–0
1	1:58	LSU	Leonard Fournette 26-yard touchdown run, Trent Domingue kick good	LSU 14–0
2	0:44	MSU	Westin Graves 43-yard kick good	LSU 14–3
3	10:04	MSU	Westin Graves 24-yard kick good	LSU 14–6
3	6:48	LSU	Leonard Fournette 18-yard touchdown run, Trent Domingue kick good	LSU 21–6
4	14:45	MSU	Dak Prescott 1-yard touchdown run, Westin Graves kick good	LSU 21–13
4	4:00	MSU	De'Runnya Wilson 5-yard touchdown pass from Dak Prescott, Dak Prescott pass failed	LSU 21–19

=== Northwestern State ===
Northwestern State at Mississippi State

Team	1	2	3	4	Total
Demons	0	6	7	0	13
• Bulldogs	20	14	14	14	62

- Date: September 19
- Location: Davis Wade Stadium
  Starkville, MS
- Game start: 3:00 p.m. CDT
- Elapsed time: 3:00
- Game attendance: 61,574
- Game weather: 95 °F (35 °C), Clear skies, light wind
- Referee: Marc Curles
- TV announcers (SECN): Dave Neal (Play-by-Play), Matt Stinchcomb (Color), Kayce Smith (Sideline Reporter)

Scoring summary
1	13:21	MSU	Gabe Myles 49-yard touchdown pass from Dak Prescott, Logan Cooke pass failed	MSU 6–0
1	3:42	MSU	Ashton Shumpert 17-yard touchdown run, Westin Graves kick good	MSU 13–0
1	0:07	MSU	Aeris Williams 1-yard touchdown run, Westin Graves kick good	MSU 20–0
2	10:09	NWSU	Chris Moore 52-yard kick good	MSU 20–3
2	8:39	MSU	Gabe Myles 6-yard touchdown run, Westin Graves kick good	MSU 27–3
2	2:27	NWSU	Chris Moore 26-yard kick good	MSU 27–6
2	0:56	MSU	Brandon Holloway 6-yard touchdown pass from Dak Prescott, Westin Graves kick good	MSU 34–6
3	6:59	NWSU	De'Mard Llorens 10-yard touchdown run, Chris Moore kick good	MSU 34–13
3	4:02	MSU	Nick Fitzgerald 4-yard touchdown run, Westin Graves kick good	MSU 41–13
3	0:26	MSU	Joe Morrow 37-yard touchdown pass from Elijah Staley, Westin Graves kick good	MSU 48–13
4	12:12	MSU	Donald Gray 49-yard touchdown pass from Nick Fitzgerald, Devon Bell kick good	MSU 55–13
4	1:48	MSU	Nick Fitzgerald 3-yard touchdown run, Devon Bell kick good	MSU 62–13

=== Auburn ===
Mississippi State at Auburn

Team	1	2	3	4	Total
• Bulldogs	7	7	3	0	17
Tigers	0	0	6	3	9

- Date: September 26
- Location: Jordan–Hare Stadium
  Auburn, AL
- Game start: 6:30 p.m. CDT
- Elapsed time: 3:07
- Game attendance: 87,451
- Game weather: 73 °F (23 °C), Mostly Sunny
- Referee: John McDaid
- TV announcers (ESPN2): Mark Jones (Play-by-Play), Rod Gilmore (Color), Quint Kessenich (Sideline Reporter)

Scoring summary
1	5:18	MSU	Gabe Myles 32-yard touchdown pass from Dak Prescott, Westin Graves kick good	MSU 7–0
2	8:02	MSU	De'Runnya Wilson 17-yard touchdown pass from Dak Prescott, Westin Graves kick good	MSU 14–0
3	9:41	AU	Daniel Carlson 30-yard kick good	MSU 14–3
3	3:06	AU	Daniel Carlson 25-yard kick good	MSU 14–6
3	1:11	MSU	Westin Graves 44-yard kick good	MSU 17–6
4	1:07	AU	Daniel Carlson 51-yard kick good	MSU 17–9

=== Texas A&M ===
#21 Mississippi State at #14 Texas A&M

Team	1	2	3	4	Total
Bulldogs	3	7	0	7	17
• Aggies	14	10	3	3	30

- Date: October 3
- Location: Kyle Field
  College Station, TX
- Game start: 6:30 p.m. CDT
- Elapsed time: 3:22
- Game attendance: 104,455
- Game weather: 83 °F (28 °C), Fall like weather
- Referee: Matt Loeffler
- TV announcers (SECN): Brent Musburger (Play-by-Play), Jesse Palmer (Color), Maria Taylor (Sideline Reporter)

Scoring summary
1	09:59	TAMU	R. Seals-Jones 1-yard touchdown pass from Kyle Allen, Taylor Bertolet kick good	TAMU 7–0
1	05:29	MSU	Westin Graves 38-yard kick good	TAMU 7–3
1	03:23	TAMU	Damion Ratley 29-yard touchdown pass from Kyle Allen, Taylor Bertolet kick good	TAMU 14–3
2	13:11	TAMU	Taylor Bertolet 55-yard kick good	TAMU 17–3
2	11:33	MSU	Malik Dear 44-yard touchdown run, Westin Graves kick good	TAMU 17–10
2	00:20	TAMU	Tra Carson 1-yard touchdown run, Taylor Bertolet kick good	TAMU 24–10
3	13:11	TAMU	Taylor Bertolet 24-yard kick good	TAMU 27–10
4	12:24	MSU	Dak Prescott 5-yard touchdown run, Westin Graves kick good	TAMU 27–17
4	05:23	TAMU	Taylor Bertolet 30-yard kick good	TAMU 30–17

=== Troy ===
Troy at Mississippi State

Team	1	2	3	4	Total
Trojans	0	0	14	3	17
• Bulldogs	21	17	0	7	45

- Date: October 10
- Location: Davis Wade Stadium
  Starkville, MS
- Game start: 3:00 p.m. CDT
- Elapsed time: 3:04
- Game attendance: 60,866
- Game weather: 70 °F (21 °C), Clear skies
- Referee: Brad Rogers
- TV announcers (SECN): Dave Neal (Play-by-Play), Matt Stinchcomb (Color), Kayce Smith (Sideline Reporter)

Scoring summary
1	14:24	MSU	Fred Ross 59-yard touchdown pass from Dak Prescott, Westin Graves kick good	MSU 7–0
1	13:16	MSU	Nelson Adams 0-yard fumble recovery, Westin Graves kick good	MSU 14–0
1	03:04	MSU	Fred Ross 77-yard punt return, Westin Graves kick good	MSU 21–0
2	11:39	MSU	Westin Graves 42-yard kick good	MSU 24–0
2	08:43	MSU	De'Runnya Wilson 28-yard touchdown pass from Nick Fitzgerald, Westin Graves kick good	MSU 31–0
2	00:47	MSU	Nick Fitzgerald 1-yard touchdown run, Westin Graves kick good	MSU 38–0
3	03:46	Troy	Dontreal Pruitt 5-yard touchdown run, Jed Solomon kick good	MSU 38–7
3	00:49	Troy	Brandon Burks 74-yard touchdown run, Jed Solomon kick good	MSU 38–14
4	11:11	MSU	Donald Gray 49-yard touchdown pass from Nick Fitzgerald, Westin Graves kick good	MSU 45–14
4	00:27	Troy	Jed Solomon 21-yard kick good	MSU 45–17

=== Louisiana Tech ===
Louisiana Tech at Mississippi State

Team	1	2	3	4	Total
Louisiana Tech	14	3	3	0	20
• Mississippi State	7	17	14	7	45

- Date: October 17
- Location: Davis Wade Stadium
  Starkville, MS
- Game start: 11:00 a.m. CDT
- Elapsed time: 3:16
- Game attendance: 61,651
- Game weather: 60 °F (16 °C), Sunny
- Referee: Ken Williamson
- TV announcers (SECN): Mike Couzens (Play-by-Play), Cole Cubelic (Color), Kevin Wiedl (Sideline Reporter)

Scoring summary
1	10:52	LTU	Paul Turner 21-yard touchdown pass from Jeff Driskel, Jonathan Barnes kick good	LTU 7–0
1	04:27	LTU	Trent Taylor 16-yard touchdown pass from Jeff Driskel, Jonathan Barnes kick good	LTU 14–0
1	02:30	MSU	Aeris Williams 2-yard touchdown run, Westin Graves kick good	LTU 14–7
2	11:33	MSU	Westin Graves 26-yard kick good	LTU 14–10
2	07:23	LTU	Jonathan Barnes 33-yard kick good	LTU 17–10
2	02:53	MSU	De'Runnya Wilson 5-yard touchdown pass from Dak Prescott, Westin Graves kick good	Tied 17–17
2	00:57	MSU	Dak Prescott 2-yard touchdown run, Westin Graves kick good	MSU 24–17
3	08:55	MSU	De'Runnya Wilson 20-yard touchdown pass from Dak Prescott, Westin Graves kick good	MSU 31–17
3	04:44	LTU	Jonathan Barnes 27-yard kick good	MSU 31–20
3	01:30	MSU	Fred Brown 12-yard touchdown pass from Dak Prescott, Westin Graves kick good	MSU 38–20
4	07:10	MSU	Brandon Bryant 73-yard interception return	MSU 45–20

=== Kentucky ===
Kentucky at Mississippi State

Team	1	2	3	4	Total
Wildcats	10	3	3	0	16
• Bulldogs	7	21	7	7	42

- Date: October 24
- Location: Davis Wade Stadium
  Starkville, MS
- Game start: 6:30 p.m. CDT
- Elapsed time: 3:49
- Game attendance: 61,168
- Game weather: 75 °F (24 °C), Light winds, Partly cloudy
- Referee: Tom Ritter
- TV announcers (SECN): Brent Musburger (Play-by-Play), Jesse Palmer (Color), Maria Taylor (Sideline Reporter)

Scoring summary
1	08:19	UK	Patrick Towles 2-yard touchdown run, Austin MacGinnis kick good	UK 7–0
1	02:49	MSU	Dak Prescott 1-yard touchdown run, Westin Graves kick good	Tied 7–7
1	00:56	UK	Austin MacGinnis 44-yard kick good	UK 10–7
2	13:38	MSU	De'Runnya Wilson 13-yard touchdown pass from Dak Prescott, Westin Graves kick good	MSU 14–10
2	01:34	MSU	Brandon Holloway 8-yard touchdown pass from Dak Prescott, Westin Graves kick good	MSU 21–10
2	00:34	MSU	Dak Prescott 20-yard touchdown run, Westin Graves kick good	MSU 28–10
2	00:03	UK	Austin MacGinnis 48-yard kick good	MSU 28–13
3	02:55	UK	Austin MacGinnis 32-yard kick good	MSU 28–16
3	00:59	MSU	Darrion Hutcherson 13-yard touchdown pass from Dak Prescott, Westin Graves kick good	MSU 35–16
4	9:14	MSU	Dak Prescott 18-yard touchdown run, Westin Graves kick good	MSU 42–16

=== Missouri ===
#24 Mississippi State at Missouri

Team	1	2	3	4	Total
• Bulldogs	7	7	17	0	31
Tigers	3	10	0	0	13

- Date: November 5
- Location: Faurot Field
  Columbia, MO
- Game start: 8:00 p.m. CST
- Game weather: 64 °F (18 °C), Rain
- TV announcers (ESPN): Joe Tessitore (play by play), David Pollack(color), Jesse Palmer (color), Kaylee Hartung (sideline)

Scoring summary
1	13:03	MSU	D. Prescott pass to F. Ross for 36 yards for a TD, (W. Graves kick)	MSU 7–0
1	2:00	MIZZ	A. Baggett 31 yard field goal	MSU 7–3
2	7:05	MIZZ	A. Baggett 35 yard field goal	MSU 7–6
2	6:03	MSU	D. Prescott pass to D. Wilson for 28 yards for a TD, (W. Graves kick)	MSU 14–6
2	1:50	MIZZ	R. Hansbrough run for 14 yards for a TD, (A. Baggett kick)	MSU 14–13
3	12:20	MSU	D. Prescott pass to D. Wilson for 5 yards for a TD, (W. Graves kick)	MSU 21–13
3	10:01	MSU	W. Graves 36 yard field goal	MSU 24–13
3	3:26	MSU	D. Prescott pass to F. Brown for 8 yards for a TD, (W. Graves kick)	MSU 31–13

=== Alabama ===
#3 Alabama at #20 Mississippi State

Team	1	2	3	4	Total
• Crimson Tide	0	21	3	7	31
Bulldogs	0	3	3	0	6

- Date: November 14
- Location: Davis Wade Stadium
  Starkville, MS
- Game start: 2:30 p.m. CST
- Elapsed time: 3:27
- Game attendance: 62,435
- Game weather: 62 °F (17 °C), Sunny
- Referee: Ken Williamson
- Television network: CBS

Scoring summary
2	10:44	AU	Cyrus Jones 69-yard punt return, Adam Griffith kick good	UA 7–0
2	08:36	UA	Calvin Ridley 60-yard touchdown pass from Jake Coker, Adam Griffith kick good	UA 14–0
2	06:10	MSU	Westin Graves 31-yard kick good	UA 14–3
2	05:10	UA	Derrick Henry 74-yard touchdown run, Adam Griffith kick good	UA 21–3
3	10:43	UA	Adam Griffith 42-yard kick good	UA 24–3
3	1:24	MSU	Westin Graves 39-yard kick good	UA 24–6
4	7:53	UA	Derrick Henry 65-yard touchdown run, Adam Griffith kick good	UA 31–6

=== Arkansas ===
Mississippi State at Arkansas

Team	1	2	3	4	Total
• Bulldogs	14	17	0	20	51
Razorbacks	7	14	21	8	50

- Date: November 21
- Location: Donald W. Reynolds Razorback Stadium
  Fayetteville, AR
- Game start: 6:00 p.m. CST
- Elapsed time: 3:40
- Game attendance: 71,936
- Game weather: 37 °F (3 °C), Clear
- Referee: Hubert Owens
- TV announcers (ESPN): Mike Patrick (Play-by-Play), Ed Cunningham (Color), Jerry Punch (Sideline Reporter)

Scoring summary
1	10:16	UA	Drew Morgan 20-yard touchdown pass from Brandon Allen, Cole Hedlund kick good	UA 7–0
1	07:31	MSU	Brandon Holloway 38-yard touchdown pass from Dak Prescott, Westin Graves kick good	Tied 7–7
1	03:37	MSU	Dak Prescott 4-yard touchdown run, Westin Graves kick good	MSU 14–7
2	14:13	UA	Jeremy Sprinkle 5-yard touchdown pass from Brandon Allen, Cole Hedlund kick good	Tied 14–14
2	11:47	MSU	Westin Graves 21-yard kick good	MSU 17–14
2	07:35	MSU	Fred Brown 8-yard touchdown pass from Dak Prescott, Westin Graves kick good	MSU 24–14
2	04:44	MSU	Fred Ross 55-yard touchdown pass from Dak Prescott, Westin Graves kick good	MSU 31–14
2	04:52	UA	Jared Cornelius 9-yard touchdown pass from Brandon Allen, Cole Hedlund kick good	MSU 31–21
3	12:00	UA	Jeremy Sprinkle 3-yard touchdown pass from Brandon Allen, Cole Hedlund kick good	MSU 31–28
3	11:39	UA	Hunter Henry 39-yard touchdown pass from Brandon Allen, Cole Hedlund kick good	UA 35–31
3	06:56	UA	Hunter Henry 18-yard touchdown pass from Brandon Allen, Cole Hedlund kick good	UA 42–31
4	12:54	MSU	Dak Prescott 4-yard touchdown run, Westin Graves kick good	UA 42–38
4	06:58	MSU	De'Runnya Wilson 10-yard touchdown pass from Dak Prescott, Westin Graves kick fail	MSU 44–42
4	05:33	UA	Jeremy Sprinkle 10-yard touchdown pass from Brandon Allen, Brandon Allen 2-point conversion pass from Jared Cornelius	UA 50–44
4	03:05	MSU	Fred Ross 14-yard touchdown pass from Dak Prescott, Westin Graves kick good	MSU 51–50

=== Ole Miss ===
#18 Ole Miss Rebels (7–3) at #21 Mississippi State Bulldogs (8–2)

Quarter	1	2	3	4	Total
Ole Miss	21	7	3	7	38
Mississippi St	0	3	10	14	27

at Davis Wade Stadium, Starkville, Mississippi

- Date: November 28, 2015
- Game time: 6:15 p.m. CST
- Game weather: Clear, 68 °F (20 °C)
- Game attendance: 62,265
- Referee: John McDaid
- TV: ESPN2
- Box Score

Game information

First quarter

- MISS – Chad Kelly 27-yard run (Gary Wunderlich kick), 11:09. Ole Miss 7–0. Drive: 4 plays, 62 yards, 1:14.
- MISS – Damore'ea Stringfellow 2-yard pass from Chad Kelly (Gary Wunderlich kick), 5:10. Ole Miss 14–0. Drive: 9 plays, 68 yards, 4:16.
- MISS – Tony Bridges 45-yard interception return (Gary Wunderlich kick), 3:05. Ole Miss 21–0.

Second quarter

- MSU – Westin Graves 22-yard field goal, 14:17. Ole Miss 21–3. Drive: 9 plays, 58 yards, 3:40.
- MISS – Damore'ea Stringfellow 36-yard pass from Chad Kelly (Gary Wunderlich kick), 10:45. Ole Miss 28–3. Drive: 8 plays, 75 yards, 3:22.

Third quarter

- MSU – Dak Prescott 1-yard run (Westin Graves kick), 11:54. Ole Miss 28–10. Drive: 5 plays, 46 yards, 1:50.
- MSU – Westin Graves 27-yard field goal, 5:42. Ole Miss 28–13. Drive: 12 plays, 70 yards, 2:23.
- MISS – Gary Wunderlich 48-yard field goal, 2:45. Ole Miss 31–13. Drive: 7 plays, 44 yards, 2:57.

Fourth quarter

- MISS – Jordan Wilkins 38-yard run (Gary Wunderlich kick), 13:22. Ole Miss 38–13. Drive: 7 plays, 65 yards, 2:40.
- MSU – Malik Dear 13-yard pass from Dak Prescott (Westin Graves kick), 9:38. Ole Miss 38–20. Drive: 9 plays, 75 yards, 3:44.
- MSU – Malik Dear 7-yard pass from Dak Prescott (Westin Graves kick), 1:17. Ole Miss 38–27. Drive: 10 plays, 64 yards, 3:43.

Top passers

- MISS – Chad Kelly – 21/30, 236 yards, 2 TD
- MSU – Dak Prescott – 31/42, 254 yards, 2 TD, INT

Top rushers

- MISS – Jaylen Walton – 16 rushes, 93 yards
- MSU – Dak Prescott – 21 rushes, 63 yards, TD

Top receivers

- MISS – Damore'ea Stringfellow – 5 receptions, 84 yards, 2 TD
- MSU – Fred Ross – 12 receptions, 117 yards

=== NC State (Belk Bowl) ===
NC State vs Mississippi State

Team	1	2	3	4	Total
Wolfpack	0	14	7	7	28
• Bulldogs	14	17	6	14	51

- Date: December 30
- Location: Bank of America Stadium
  Charlotte, NC
- Game start: 2:30 p.m. CST
- Television network: ESPN

The Bulldogs scored their second-most points in a bowl game in school history with the win over NC State. Prescott passed for 380 yards, four touchdowns, and one interception in the game.
