= Jermaine Eluemunor =

British-American football player (born 1994)

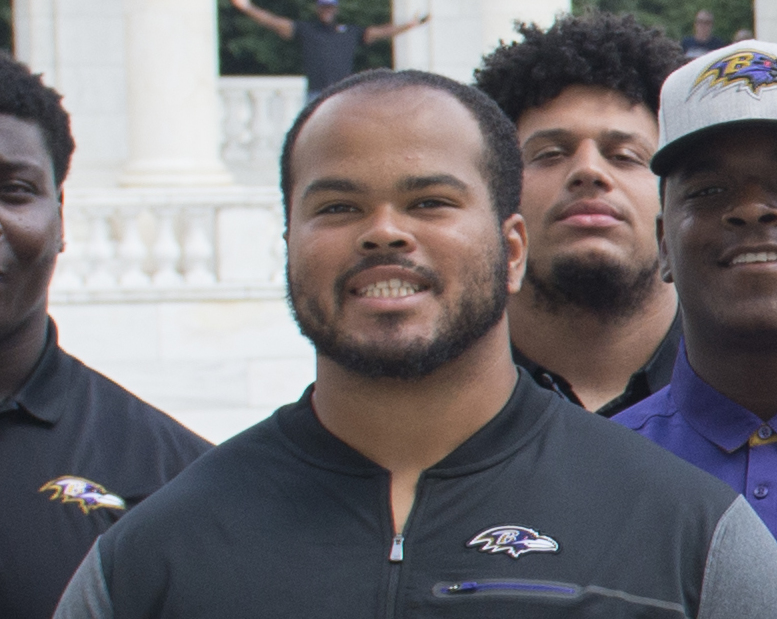
- Eluemunor with the Baltimore Ravens in 2017

No. 72 – New York Giants
- Position: Offensive tackle
- Roster status: Active

Personal information
- Born: 13 December 1994 (age 31); London, England
- Listed height: 6 ft 4 in (1.93 m)
- Listed weight: 338 lb (153 kg)

Career information
- High school: Morris Knolls (Denville Township, New Jersey, U.S.)
- College: Lackawanna (2012–2013); Texas A&M (2014–2016)
- NFL draft: 2017: 5th round, 159th overall pick

Career history
- Baltimore Ravens (2017–2018); New England Patriots (2019–2020); Miami Dolphins (2021)*; Jacksonville Jaguars (2021)*; Las Vegas Raiders (2021–2023); New York Giants (2024–present)
- * Offseason or practice squad member only

Awards and highlights
- PFWA All-Rookie Team (2017)

Career NFL statistics as of 2025
- Games played: 118
- Games started: 76
- Stats at Pro Football Reference

Jermaine Eluemunor (/ɛˈluːmənɔːr/ eh-LOO-mə-nor; born 13 December 1994) is an English professional American football offensive tackle for the New York Giants of the National Football League (NFL). He played college football for the Texas A&M Aggies and high school football for Morris Knolls High School in Denville, New Jersey.

== Early life ==
Eluemunor was born to a Nigerian father and English mother in Chalk Farm, London. He attended Haverstock School. Growing up, he played rugby and cricket. He became interested in American football after watching the 2007 Miami Dolphins-New York Giants game on television. The game was played at Wembley Stadium in London as part of the NFL International Series.

Eluemunor moved to the United States with his father at age 14, when he started playing American football at Morris Knolls High School near Denville Township, New Jersey. At Morris Knolls, he played football and wrestled. He played on the defensive and offensive lines in football. As a senior wrestler, he recorded a 33–4 record.

== College career ==
Out of high school, Eluemunor was not recruited by any college football programs. He attended Lackawanna College in Scranton, Pennsylvania from 2012 to 2013. In 2013 he made the all-conference second-team.

After being recruited by 35 college programs, Eluemunor originally committed to UCLA, then flipped to Arkansas but then decommitted before committing to Texas A&M. Eluemunor attended Texas A&M from 2014 to 2016. He redshirted in 2014. In 2015, he was the backup right guard. He made his first career start during the 2015 Music City Bowl. In 2016, he started 12 of the 13 games, with three at right guard and nine at right tackle.

Eluemunor attributes his development in football to Texas A&M offensive line coach Jim Turner.

== Professional career ==
=== Pre-draft ===
Pre-draft measurables
Height	Weight	Arm length	Hand span	Wingspan	40-yard dash	10-yard split	20-yard split	20-yard shuttle	Three-cone drill	Vertical jump	Broad jump	Bench press
6 ft 3 7/8 in (1.93 m)	332 lb (151 kg)	33 1/4 in (0.84 m)	9 1/2 in (0.24 m)	6 ft 7 1/4 in (2.01 m)	5.22 s	1.84 s	3.02 s	4.90 s	7.74 s	28.5 in (0.72 m)	8 ft 7 in (2.62 m)	34 reps
All values from NFL Combine/Pro Day

At the 2017 NFL Combine, Eluemunor tied the second-highest number of reps in the 225-lb bench press with 34.

=== Baltimore Ravens ===
Eluemunor was selected by the Baltimore Ravens in the fifth round (159th overall) in the 2017 NFL draft. In his rookie season, Eluemunor saw action in eight games, starting two at right guard, and was named to the Pro Football Writers of America All-Rookie Team.

On 22 September 2018, Eluemunor was waived by the Ravens and was re-signed to the practice squad. He was promoted to the active roster on 23 October 2018. He was resigned as an exclusive rights free agent 15 April 2019.

=== New England Patriots ===
On 28 August 2019, Eluemunor and a sixth-round pick was traded to the New England Patriots for a 2020 fourth-round pick.

The Patriots re-signed Eluemunor to a one-year restricted free agent contract on 16 April 2020. He was named the starting right tackle to begin the 2020 season. He started four of the first five games before suffering an ankle injury in Week 6. He was placed on injured reserve on 21 October 2020. He was activated on 14 November 2020.

=== Miami Dolphins ===
On 14 June 2021, Eluemunor signed with the Miami Dolphins. He was released on 24 August 2021.

=== Jacksonville Jaguars ===
On 28 August 2021, Eluemunor signed with the Jacksonville Jaguars. He was released by Jacksonville on 31 August.

=== Las Vegas Raiders ===
On 2 September 2021, Eluemunor signed with the Las Vegas Raiders, ultimately starting three games that season. He re-signed with the team on 25 March 2022.

In 2022 he had his best season to date starting 17 out of 17 games at right tackle for the Raiders.

Eluemunor re-signed with the Raiders on 19 March 2023. In the 2023 season, he appeared in all 17 games and started 14.

=== New York Giants ===
On 14 March 2024, Eluemunor signed a two-year contract with the New York Giants. He was named the Week 1 starting right tackle in 2024, starting nine games there and six at left tackle. Eluemunor returned as the starting right tackle in 2025, starting 16 games.

On 12 March 2026, Eluemunor re-signed with the Giants on a three-year, $39 million contract.
