= 2015 NCAA Division I FBS football rankings =

- Season: 2015
- Bowl season: 2015–16 bowl games
- Preseason No. 1: Ohio State
- End of season champions: Alabama
- Conference with most teams in final AP poll: Big Ten (6)

Two human polls and a committee's selections comprised the 2015 National Collegiate Athletic Association (NCAA) Division I Football Bowl Subdivision (FBS) football rankings, in addition to various publications' preseason polls. Unlike most sports, college football's governing body, the NCAA, does not bestow a national championship, instead that title is bestowed by one or more different polling agencies. There are two main weekly polls that begin in the preseason—the AP Poll and the Coaches Poll. One additional poll is released midway through the season; the College Football Playoff (CFP) rankings are released after the eighth week.

This was the second season of the four-team College Football Playoff system which replaced the previous Bowl Championship Series system. At the conclusion of the regular season, on Sunday, December 6, 2015, the final CFP rankings will determine who will play in the two bowl games designated as semifinals for the 2016 College Football Playoff National Championship on January 11, 2016, at University of Phoenix Stadium in Phoenix, Arizona.

== Legend ==
	Increase in ranking
	Decrease in ranking
	Not ranked previous week
	Selected for College Football Playoff
(#–#)	Win–loss record
(Italics)	Number of first place votes
т	Tied with team above or below also with this symbol

== AP Poll ==
	Preseason Aug 23	Week 1 Sep 8	Week 2 Sep 13	Week 3 Sep 20	Week 4 Sep 27	Week 5 Oct 4	Week 6 Oct 11	Week 7 Oct 18	Week 8 Oct 25	Week 9 Nov 1	Week 10 Nov 8	Week 11 Nov 15	Week 12 Nov 22	Week 13 Nov 29	Week 14 Dec 6	Week 15 (Final) Jan 12	
1.	Ohio State (61)	Ohio State (1–0) (61)	Ohio State (2–0) (59)	Ohio State (3–0) (42)	Ohio State (4–0) (45)	Ohio State (5–0) (38)	Ohio State (6–0) (27)	Ohio State (7–0) (28)	Ohio State (8–0) (39)	Ohio State (8–0) (39)	Clemson (9–0) (31)	Clemson (10–0) (34)	Clemson (11–0) (55)	Clemson (12–0) (53)	Clemson (13–0) (51)	Alabama (14–1) (61)	1.
2.	TCU	Alabama (1–0)	Alabama (2–0)	Michigan State (3–0) (7)	Michigan State (4–0) (5)	TCU (5–0) (5)	Baylor (5–0) (13)	Baylor (6–0) (12)	Baylor (7–0) (7)	Baylor (7–0) (6)	Ohio State (9–0) (26)	Ohio State (10–0) (23)	Alabama (10–1) (6)	Alabama (11–1) (8)	Alabama (12–1) (9)	Clemson (14–1)	2.
3.	Alabama	TCU (1–0)	TCU (2–0)	Ole Miss (3–0) (11) т	Ole Miss (4–0) (10)	Baylor (5–0) (10)	TCU (6–0) (3)	Utah (6–0) (16)	Clemson (7–0) (6)	Clemson (8–0) (6)	Alabama (8–1) (2)	Alabama (9–1) (4)	Iowa (11–0)	Oklahoma (11–1)	Michigan State (12–1) (1)	Stanford (12–2)	3.
4.	Baylor	Baylor (1–0)	Michigan State (2–0) (2)	TCU (3–0) т	TCU (4–0)	Michigan State (5–0)	Utah (5–0) (16)	TCU (7–0) (3)	LSU (7–0) (5)	LSU (7–0) (5)	Baylor (8–0) (2)	Oklahoma State (10–0)	Notre Dame (10–1)	Iowa (12–0)	Oklahoma (11–1)	Ohio State (12–1)	4.
5.	Michigan State	Michigan State (1–0)	Baylor (2–0)	Baylor (2–0)	Baylor (3–0)	Utah (4–0) (7)	Clemson (5–0) (1)	LSU (6–0) (1)	TCU (7–0) (3)	TCU (8–0) (4)	Oklahoma State (9–0)	Notre Dame (9–1)	Oklahoma (10–1)	Michigan State (11–1)	Stanford (11–2)	Oklahoma (11–2)	5.
6.	Auburn	Auburn (1–0)	USC (2–0)	Notre Dame (3–0)	Notre Dame (4–0)	Clemson (4–0)	LSU (5–0)	Clemson (6–0) (1)	Michigan State (8–0)	Michigan State (8–0)	Notre Dame (8–1)	Iowa (10–0)	Michigan State (10–1)	Ohio State (11–1)	Iowa (12–1)	Michigan State (12–2)	6.
7.	Oregon	Oregon (1–0)	Georgia (2–0)	Georgia (3–0)	UCLA (4–0)	LSU (4–0)	Michigan State (6–0)	Michigan State (7–0)	Alabama (7–1) (1)	Alabama (7–1) (1)	Stanford (8–1)	Oklahoma (9–1)	Baylor (9–1)	Stanford (10–2)	Ohio State (11–1)	TCU (11–2)	7.
8.	USC	USC (1–0)	Notre Dame (2–0)	LSU (2–0) (1)	Georgia (4–0)	Alabama (4–1)	Florida (6–0)	Alabama (6–1)	Stanford (6–1)	Notre Dame (7–1)	Iowa (9–0)	Florida (9–1)	Ohio State (10–1)	North Carolina (11–1)	Notre Dame (10–2)	Houston (13–1)	8.
9.	Georgia	Notre Dame (1–0)	Florida State (2–0)	UCLA (3–0)	LSU (3–0)	Texas A&M (5–0) (1)	Texas A&M (5–0) (1)	Florida State (6–0)	Notre Dame (6–1)	Stanford (7–1)	LSU (7–1)	Michigan State (9–1)	Oklahoma State (10–1)	Notre Dame (10–2)	Florida State (10–2)	Iowa (12–2)	9.
10.	Florida State	Georgia (1–0)	UCLA (2–0)	Florida State (3–0)	Utah (4–0) (1)	Oklahoma (4–0)	Alabama (5–1)	Stanford (5–1)	Iowa (7–0)	Iowa (8–0)	Utah (8–1)	Baylor (8–1)	Florida (10–1)	Florida State (10–2)	North Carolina (11–2)	Ole Miss (10–3)	10.
11.	Notre Dame	Florida State (1–0)	Clemson (2–0)	Clemson (3–0)	Florida State (4–0)	Florida (5–0)	Florida State (5–0)	Notre Dame (6–1)	Florida (6–1)	Florida (7–1)	Florida (8–1)	TCU (9–1)	North Carolina (10–1)	TCU (10–2)	TCU (10–2)	Notre Dame (10–3)	11.
12.	Clemson	Clemson (1–0)	Oregon (1–1)	Alabama (2–1)	Clemson (3–0)	Florida State (4–0)	Michigan (5–1)	Iowa (7–0)	Oklahoma State (7–0)	Oklahoma State (8–0)	Oklahoma (8–1)	North Carolina (9–1)	Michigan (9–2)	Baylor (9–2)	Northwestern (10–2)	Michigan (10–3)	12.
13.	UCLA	UCLA (1–0)	LSU (1–0)	Oregon (2–1)	Alabama (3–1)	Northwestern (5–0)	Ole Miss (5–1)	Florida (6–1)	Utah (6–1)	Utah (7–1)	TCU (8–1)	Houston (10–0)	Stanford (9–2)	Northwestern (10–2)	Oklahoma State (10–2)	Baylor (10–3)	13.
14.	LSU	LSU (0–0)	Georgia Tech (2–0)	Texas A&M (3–0)	Texas A&M (4–0)	Ole Miss (4–1)	Notre Dame (5–1)	Oklahoma State (6–0)	Oklahoma (6–1)	Oklahoma (7–1)	Michigan State (8–1)	Michigan (8–2)	Florida State (9–2)	Oklahoma State (10–2)	Houston (12–1)	Florida State (10–3)	14.
15.	Arizona State	Georgia Tech (1–0)	Ole Miss (2–0)	Oklahoma (3–0)	Oklahoma (3–0)	Notre Dame (4–1)	Stanford (4–1)	Michigan (5–2) т	Michigan (5–2)	Memphis (8–0)	Michigan (7–2)	Stanford (8–2)	TCU (9–2)	Oregon (9–3)	Oregon (9–3)	North Carolina (11–3)	15.
16.	Georgia Tech	Texas A&M (1–0)	Oklahoma (2–0)	Arizona (3–0)	Northwestern (4–0)	Stanford (4–1)	Oklahoma State (6–0)	Texas A&M (5–1) т	Memphis (7–0)	Michigan (6–2)	Houston (9–0)	Florida State (8–2)	Navy (9–1)	Ole Miss (9–3)	Ole Miss (9–3)	LSU (9–3)	16.
17.	Ole Miss	Ole Miss (1–0)	Texas A&M (2–0)	Northwestern (3–0)	USC (3–1)	USC (3–1)	Iowa (6–0)	Oklahoma (5–1)	Florida State (6–1)	Florida State (7–1)	North Carolina (8–1)	LSU (7–2)	Northwestern (9–2)	Houston (11–1)	Michigan (9–3)	Utah (10–3)	17.
18.	Arkansas	Arkansas (1–0)	Auburn (2–0)	Utah (3–0)	Stanford (3–1)	Michigan (4–1)	UCLA (4–1)	Memphis (6–0)	Houston (7–0)	Houston (8–0)	UCLA (7–2)	Utah (8–2)	Oregon (8–3)	Florida (10–2)	Baylor (9–3)	Navy (11–2)	18.
19.	Oklahoma	Oklahoma (1–0)	BYU (2–0)	USC (2–1)	Wisconsin (3–1)	Georgia (4–1)	Oklahoma (4–1)	Toledo (6–0)	Ole Miss (6–2)	Ole Miss (7–2)	Florida State (7–2)	Navy (8–1)	Ole Miss (8–3)	Michigan (9–3)	Florida (10–3)	Oregon (9–4)	19.
20.	Wisconsin	Boise State (1–0)	Arizona (2–0)	Georgia Tech (2–1)	Oklahoma State (4–0)	UCLA (4–1)	Northwestern (5–1)	California (5–1)	Toledo (7–0)	Toledo (7–0)	Mississippi State (7–2)	Northwestern (8–2)	Washington State (8–3)	Temple (10–2)	Utah (9–3)	Oklahoma State (10–3)	20.
21.	Stanford	Missouri (1–0)	Utah (2–0)	Stanford (2–1)	Mississippi State (3–1)	Oklahoma State (5–0)	Boise State (5–1)	Houston (6–0)	Temple (7–0)	North Carolina (7–1)	Temple (8–1)	Wisconsin (8–2)	Houston (10–1)	Utah (9–3)	Navy (9–2)	Wisconsin (10–3)	21.
22.	Arizona	Arizona (1–0)	Missouri (2–0)	BYU (2–1) т	Michigan (3–1)	Iowa (5–0)	Toledo (5–0)	Temple (6–0)	Duke (6–1)	UCLA (6–2)	Navy (7–1)	USC (7–3)	UCLA (8–3)	Navy (9–2)	LSU (8–3)	Tennessee (9–4)	22.
23.	Boise State	Tennessee (1–0)	Northwestern (2–0)	Wisconsin (2–1) т	West Virginia (3–0)	California (5–0)	California (5–1)	Duke (5–1)	Pittsburgh (6–1)	Temple (7–1)	Wisconsin (8–2)	Oregon (7–3)	Mississippi State (8–3)	LSU (8–3)	Wisconsin (9–3)	Northwestern (10–3)	23.
24.	Missouri	Utah (1–0)	Wisconsin (1–1)	Oklahoma State (3–0)	California (4–0)	Toledo (4–0)	Houston (5–0)	Ole Miss (5–2)	UCLA (5–2)	Mississippi State (6–2)	Northwestern (7–2)	Washington State (7–3)	Toledo (9–1)	USC (8–4)	Temple (10–3)	Western Kentucky (12–2)	24.
25.	Tennessee	Mississippi State (1–0)	Oklahoma State (2–0)	Missouri (3–0)	Florida (4–0)	Boise State (4–1)	Duke (5–1)	Pittsburgh (5–1)	Mississippi State (6–2)	Texas A&M (6–2)	Memphis (8–1)	Ole Miss (7–3)	Temple (9–2)	Wisconsin (9–3)	Western Kentucky (11–2)	Florida (10–4)	25.
	Preseason Aug 23	Week 1 Sep 8	Week 2 Sep 13	Week 3 Sep 20	Week 4 Sep 27	Week 5 Oct 4	Week 6 Oct 11	Week 7 Oct 18	Week 8 Oct 25	Week 9 Nov 1	Week 10 Nov 8	Week 11 Nov 15	Week 12 Nov 22	Week 13 Nov 29	Week 14 Dec 6	Week 15 (Final) Jan 12	
		Dropped: Arizona State; Wisconsin; Stanford	Dropped: Arkansas; Boise State; Tennessee; Mississippi State	Dropped: Auburn	Dropped: Oregon; Arizona; Georgia Tech; BYU; Missouri	Dropped: Wisconsin; Mississippi State; West Virginia	Dropped: USC; Georgia	Dropped: UCLA; Northwestern; Boise State	Dropped: Texas A&M; California	Dropped: Duke; Pittsburgh	Dropped: Ole Miss; Toledo; Texas A&M	Dropped: UCLA; Mississippi State; Temple; Memphis	Dropped: LSU; USC; Utah; Wisconsin	Dropped: Washington State; UCLA; Mississippi State; Toledo	Dropped: USC	Dropped: Temple	

== Coaches Poll ==
	Preseason Jul 30	Week 1 Sep 8	Week 2 Sep 13	Week 3 Sep 20	Week 4 Sep 27	Week 5 Oct 4	Week 6 Oct 11	Week 7 Oct 18	Week 8 Oct 25	Week 9 Nov 1	Week 10 Nov 8	Week 11 Nov 15	Week 12 Nov 22	Week 13 Nov 29	Week 14 Dec 6	Week 15 (Final) Jan 12	
1.	Ohio State (62)	Ohio State (1–0) (63)	Ohio State (2–0) (62)	Ohio State (3–0) (61)	Ohio State (4–0) (61)	Ohio State (5–0) (50)	Ohio State (6–0) (47)	Ohio State (7–0) (45)	Ohio State (8–0) (49)	Ohio State (8–0) (48)	Ohio State (9–0) (34)	Clemson (10–0) (28)	Clemson (11–0) (58)	Clemson (12–0) (53)	Clemson (13–0) (55)	Alabama (14–1) (56)	1.
2.	TCU (1)	Alabama (1–0) (1)	Alabama (2–0) (1)	TCU (3–0)	Michigan State (4–0) (2)	TCU (5–0) (4)	Baylor (5–0) (8)	Baylor (6–0) (12)	Baylor (7–0) (10)	Baylor (7–0) (9)	Clemson (9–0) (21)	Ohio State (10–0) (32)	Alabama (10–1) (5)	Alabama (11–1) (8)	Alabama (12–1) (5)	Clemson (14–1)	2.
3.	Alabama (1)	TCU (1–0)	TCU (2–0)	Michigan State (3–0) (3)	TCU (4–0)	Michigan State (5–0) (1)	TCU (6–0) (5)	TCU (7–0) (4)	TCU (7–0) (2)	TCU (8–0) (4)	Baylor (8–0) (5)	Alabama (9–1) (4)	Iowa (11–0) (1)	Iowa (12–0) (1)	Oklahoma (11–1)	Stanford (12–2)	3.
4.	Baylor	Baylor (1–0)	Michigan State (2–0)	Baylor (2–0)	Baylor (3–0)	Baylor (4–0) (5)	Michigan State (6–0) (1)	Michigan State (7–0)	LSU (7–0) (1)	LSU (7–0) (1)	Alabama (8–1) (3)	Oklahoma State (10–0)	Notre Dame (10–1)	Oklahoma (11–1) (2)	Michigan State (12–1)	Ohio State (12–1)	4.
5.	Oregon	Oregon (1–0)	Baylor (2–0)	Ole Miss (3–0)	Ole Miss (4–0) (1)	LSU (4–0) (1)	LSU (5–0) (1)	LSU (6–0) (1)	Michigan State (8–0)	Clemson (8–0) (2)	Oklahoma State (9–0)	Notre Dame (9–1)	Oklahoma (10–1)	Michigan State (11–1)	Ohio State (11–1)	Oklahoma (11–2)	5.
6.	Michigan State	Michigan State (1–0)	Florida State (2–0)	Georgia (3–0)	Georgia (4–0)	Clemson (4–0)	Clemson (5–0)	Clemson (6–0)	Clemson (7–0) (1)	Michigan State (8–0)	Notre Dame (8–1)	Iowa (10–0)	Michigan State (10–1)	Ohio State (11–1)	Stanford (11–2)	Michigan State (12–2)	6.
7.	Auburn	Auburn (1–0)	USC (2–0)	Florida State (3–0)	Notre Dame (4–0)	Utah (4–0) (1)	Utah (5–0) (1)	Utah (6–0) (1)	Alabama (7–1)	Alabama (7–1)	Stanford (8–1)	Oklahoma (9–1)	Baylor (9–1)	Stanford (10–2)	Iowa (12–1)	TCU (11–2)	7.
8.	Florida State	Florida State (1–0)	Georgia (2–0)	Notre Dame (3–0)	LSU (3–0)	Florida State (4–0)	Florida State (5–0)	Alabama (6–1)	Stanford (6–1)	Stanford (7–1)	Iowa (9–0)	Florida (9–1)	Ohio State (10–1)	North Carolina (11–1)	Florida State (10–2)	Houston (13–1)	8.
9.	Georgia	Georgia (1–0)	Clemson (2–0)	LSU (2–0)	Florida State (3–0)	Oklahoma (4–0)	Alabama (5–1)	Florida State (6–0)	Notre Dame (6–1)	Notre Dame (7–1)	LSU (7–1)	Michigan State (9–1)	Florida (10–1)	Florida State (10–2)	Notre Dame (10–2)	Ole Miss (10–3)	9.
10.	USC	USC (1–0)	Notre Dame (2–0)	Clemson (3–0)	UCLA (4–0)	Alabama (4–1)	Texas A&M (5–0)	Notre Dame (6–1)	Oklahoma State (7–0)	Oklahoma State (8–0)	Florida (8–1)	Baylor (8–1)	Oklahoma State (10–1)	Notre Dame (10–2)	TCU (10–2)	Iowa (12–2)	10.
11.	Notre Dame	Notre Dame (1–0)	Ole Miss (2–0)	UCLA (3–0)	Clemson (3–0)	Texas A&M (5–0)	Florida (6–0)	Stanford (5–1)	Iowa (7–0)	Iowa (8–0)	Oklahoma (8–1)	TCU (9–1)	North Carolina (10–1)	TCU (10–2)	North Carolina (11–2)	Michigan (10–3)	11.
12.	Clemson	Clemson (1–0)	UCLA (2–0)	Alabama (2–1)	Utah (4–0)	Florida (5–0)	Ole Miss (5–1)	Oklahoma State (6–0)	Florida (6–1)	Florida (7–1)	TCU (8–1)	North Carolina (9–1)	Michigan (9–2) т	Baylor (9–2)	Northwestern (10–2)	Notre Dame (10–3)	12.
13.	LSU	UCLA (1–0)	Oregon (1–1)	Oregon (2–1)	Alabama (3–1)	Ole Miss (4–1)	Notre Dame (5–1)	Iowa (7–0)	Oklahoma (6–1)	Oklahoma (7–1)	Utah (8–1)	Michigan (8–2)	Stanford (9–2) т	Northwestern (10–2)	Oklahoma State (10–2)	Baylor (10–3)	13.
14.	UCLA	Ole Miss (1–0)	LSU (1–0)	Oklahoma (3–0)	Oklahoma (3–0)	Northwestern (5–0)	Michigan (5–1)	Florida (6–1)	Utah (6–1)	Utah (7–1)	Michigan State (8–1)	Houston (10–0)	Florida State (9–2)	Oklahoma State (10–2)	Oregon (9–3)	Florida State (10–3)	14.
15.	Ole Miss	LSU (0–0)	Auburn (2–0)	Texas A&M (3–0)	Texas A&M (4–0)	Notre Dame (4–1)	Oklahoma State (6–0)	Oklahoma (5–1)	Florida State (6–1)	Florida State (7–1)	Michigan (7–2)	Stanford (8–2)	Navy (9–1)	Florida (10–2)	Ole Miss (9–3)	North Carolina (11–3)	15.
16.	Arizona State	Georgia Tech (1–0)	Georgia Tech (2–0)	Arizona (3–0)	USC (3–1)	Georgia (4–1)	Stanford (4–1)	Texas A&M (5–1)	Memphis (7–0)	Memphis (8–0)	Houston (9–0)	Florida State (8–2)	TCU (9–2)	Oregon (9–3)	Houston (12–1)	Utah (10–3)	16.
17.	Georgia Tech	Oklahoma (1–0)	Oklahoma (2–0)	Utah (3–0)	Northwestern (4–0)	USC (3–1)	Iowa (6–0)	Memphis (6–0) т	Michigan (5–2)	Michigan (6–2)	North Carolina (8–1)	LSU (7–2)	Northwestern (9–2)	Ole Miss (9–3)	Michigan (9–3)	LSU (9–3)	17.
18.	Wisconsin	Arkansas (1–0)	Texas A&M (2–0)	USC (2–1)	Wisconsin (3–1)	Stanford (4–1)	UCLA (4–1)	Michigan (5–2) т	Duke (6–1)	Houston (8–0)	UCLA (7–2)	Utah (8–2)	Oregon (8–3)	Houston (11–1)	Florida (10–3)	Navy (11–2)	18.
19.	Oklahoma	Texas A&M (1–0)	Arizona (2–0)	Northwestern (3–0)	Oklahoma State (4–0)	Oklahoma State (5–0)	Oklahoma (4–1)	California (5–1)	Houston (7–0)	Ole Miss (7–2)	Florida State (7–2)	Navy (8–1)	Ole Miss (8–3)	Michigan (9–3)	Baylor (9–3)	Oklahoma State (10–3)	19.
20.	Arkansas	Arizona (1–0)	Missouri (2–0)	Georgia Tech (2–1)	Stanford (3–1)	UCLA (4–1)	Boise State (5–1)	Toledo (6–0)	Toledo (7–0)	Toledo (7–0)	Mississippi State (7–2)	Wisconsin (8–2)	Washington State (8–3)	Utah (9–3)	Utah (9–3)	Oregon (9–4)	20.
21.	Stanford	Missouri (1–0)	Utah (2–0)	Wisconsin (2–1)	West Virginia (3–0)	Michigan (4–1)	Northwestern (5–1)	Duke (5–1)	Ole Miss (6–2)	North Carolina (7–1)	Temple (8–1)	Northwestern (8–2)	Houston (10–1)	Temple (10–2)	LSU (8–3)	Wisconsin (10–3)	21.
22.	Arizona	Boise State (1–0)	BYU (2–0)	Oklahoma State (3–0)	Mississippi State (3–1)	California (5–0)	Memphis (5–0)	Houston (6–0)	Temple (7–0)	UCLA (6–2)	Wisconsin (8–2)	Oregon (7–3)	Mississippi State (8–3)	Navy (9–2)	Navy (9–2)	Northwestern (10–3)	22.
23.	Missouri	Tennessee (1–0)	Wisconsin (1–1)	Missouri (3–0)	Florida (4–0)	Iowa (5–0)	California (5–1)	Ole Miss (5–2)	Georgia (5–2)	Temple (7–1)	Navy (7–1)	Washington State (7–3)	UCLA (8–3)	LSU (8–3)	Wisconsin (9–3)	Tennessee (9–4)	23.
24.	Boise State	Wisconsin (0–1)	Northwestern (2–0)	Stanford (2–1)	California (4–0) т	Boise State (4–1)	Duke (5–1)	Temple (6–0)	Pittsburgh (6–1)	Texas A&M (6–2)	Northwestern (7–2)	USC (7–3)	Temple (9–2)	USC (8–4)	Temple (10–3)	Georgia (10–3)	24.
25.	Tennessee	Utah (1–0)	Oklahoma State (2–0)	Auburn (2–1)	Oregon (2–2) т	Memphis (5–0)	Toledo (5–0)	Georgia (5–2)	UCLA (5–2)	Mississippi State (6–2)	Memphis (8–1)	Ole Miss (7–3) т; Mississippi State (7–3) т	Utah (8–3)	Wisconsin (9–3)	Georgia (9–3)	Florida (10–4)	25.
	Preseason Jul 30	Week 1 Sep 8	Week 2 Sep 13	Week 3 Sep 20	Week 4 Sep 27	Week 5 Oct 4	Week 6 Oct 11	Week 7 Oct 18	Week 8 Oct 25	Week 9 Nov 1	Week 10 Nov 8	Week 11 Nov 15	Week 12 Nov 22	Week 13 Nov 29	Week 14 Dec 6	Week 15 (Final) Jan 12	
		Dropped: Arizona State; Stanford	Dropped: Arkansas; Boise State; Tennessee	Dropped: BYU	Dropped: Arizona; Georgia Tech; Missouri; Auburn	Dropped: Wisconsin; West Virginia; Mississippi State; Oregon	Dropped: Georgia; USC	Dropped: UCLA; Boise State; Northwestern	Dropped: Texas A&M; California	Dropped: Duke; Georgia; Pittsburgh	Dropped: Ole Miss; Toledo; Texas A&M	Dropped: UCLA; Temple; Memphis	Dropped: LSU; Wisconsin; USC	Dropped: Washington State; Mississippi State; UCLA	Dropped: USC	Dropped: Temple	

== CFP rankings ==
	Week 9 Nov 3	Week 10 Nov 10	Week 11 Nov 17	Week 12 Nov 24	Week 13 Dec 1	Week 14 (Final) Dec 6	
1.	Clemson (8–0)	Clemson (9–0)	Clemson (10–0)	Clemson (11–0)	Clemson (12–0)	Clemson (13–0)	1.
2.	LSU (7–0)	Alabama (8–1)	Alabama (9–1)	Alabama (10–1)	Alabama (11–1)	Alabama (12–1)	2.
3.	Ohio State (8–0)	Ohio State (9–0)	Ohio State (10–0)	Oklahoma (10–1)	Oklahoma (11–1)	Michigan State (12–1)	3.
4.	Alabama (7–1)	Notre Dame (8–1)	Notre Dame (9–1)	Iowa (11–0)	Iowa (12–0)	Oklahoma (11–1)	4.
5.	Notre Dame (7–1)	Iowa (9–0)	Iowa (10–0)	Michigan State (10–1)	Michigan State (11–1)	Iowa (12–1)	5.
6.	Baylor (7–0)	Baylor (8–0)	Oklahoma State (10–0)	Notre Dame (10–1)	Ohio State (11–1)	Stanford (11–2)	6.
7.	Michigan State (8–0)	Stanford (8–1)	Oklahoma (9–1)	Baylor (9–1)	Stanford (10–2)	Ohio State (11–1)	7.
8.	TCU (8–0)	Oklahoma State (9–0)	Florida (9–1)	Ohio State (10–1)	Notre Dame (10–2)	Notre Dame (10–2)	8.
9.	Iowa (8–0)	LSU (7–1)	Michigan State (9–1)	Stanford (9–2)	Florida State (10–2)	Florida State (10–2)	9.
10.	Florida (7–1)	Utah (8–1)	Baylor (8–1)	Michigan (9–2)	North Carolina (11–1)	North Carolina (11–2)	10.
11.	Stanford (7–1)	Florida (8–1)	Stanford (8–2)	Oklahoma State (10–1)	TCU (10–2)	TCU (10–2)	11.
12.	Utah (7–1)	Oklahoma (8–1)	Michigan (8–2)	Florida (10–1)	Baylor (9–2)	Ole Miss (9–3)	12.
13.	Memphis (8–0)	Michigan State (8–1)	Utah (8–2)	Florida State (9–2)	Ole Miss (9–3)	Northwestern (10–2)	13.
14.	Oklahoma State (8–0)	Michigan (7–2)	Florida State (8–2)	North Carolina (10–1)	Northwestern (10–2)	Michigan (9–3)	14.
15.	Oklahoma (7–1)	TCU (8–1)	LSU (7–2)	Navy (9–1)	Michigan (9–3)	Oregon (9–3)	15.
16.	Florida State (7–1)	Florida State (7–2)	Navy (8–1)	Northwestern (9–2)	Oregon (9–3)	Oklahoma State (10–2)	16.
17.	Michigan (6–2)	Mississippi State (7–2)	North Carolina (9–1)	Oregon (8–3)	Oklahoma State (10–2)	Baylor (9–3)	17.
18.	Ole Miss (7–2)	Northwestern (7–2)	TCU (9–1)	Ole Miss (8–3)	Florida (10–2)	Houston (12–1)	18.
19.	Texas A&M (6–2)	UCLA (7–2)	Houston (10–0)	TCU (9–2)	Houston (11–1)	Florida (10–3)	19.
20.	Mississippi State (6–2)	Navy (7–1)	Northwestern (8–2)	Washington State (8–3)	USC (8–4)	LSU (8–3)	20.
21.	Northwestern (6–2)	Memphis (8–1)	Memphis (8–2)	Mississippi State (8–3)	LSU (8–3)	Navy (9–2)	21.
22.	Temple (7–1)	Temple (8–1)	Ole Miss (7–3)	UCLA (8–3)	Temple (10–2)	Utah (9–3)	22.
23.	UCLA (6–2)	North Carolina (8–1)	Oregon (7–3)	Utah (8–3)	Navy (9–2)	Tennessee (8–4)	23.
24.	Toledo (7–0)	Houston (9–0)	USC (7–3)	Toledo (9–1)	Utah (9–3)	Temple (10–3)	24.
25.	Houston (8–0)	Wisconsin (8–2)	Wisconsin (8–2)	Temple (9–2)	Tennessee (8–4)	USC (8–5)	25.
	Week 9 Nov 3	Week 10 Nov 10	Week 11 Nov 17	Week 12 Nov 24	Week 13 Dec 1	Week 14 (Final) Dec 6	
		Dropped: Ole Miss; Texas A&M; Toledo	Dropped: Mississippi State; UCLA; Temple	Dropped: LSU; Houston; Memphis; USC; Wisconsin	Dropped: Washington State; Mississippi State; UCLA; Toledo	None	
