= 2015 Music City Bowl =

2015 Franklin American Mortgage Music City Bowl
- 18th Music City Bowl
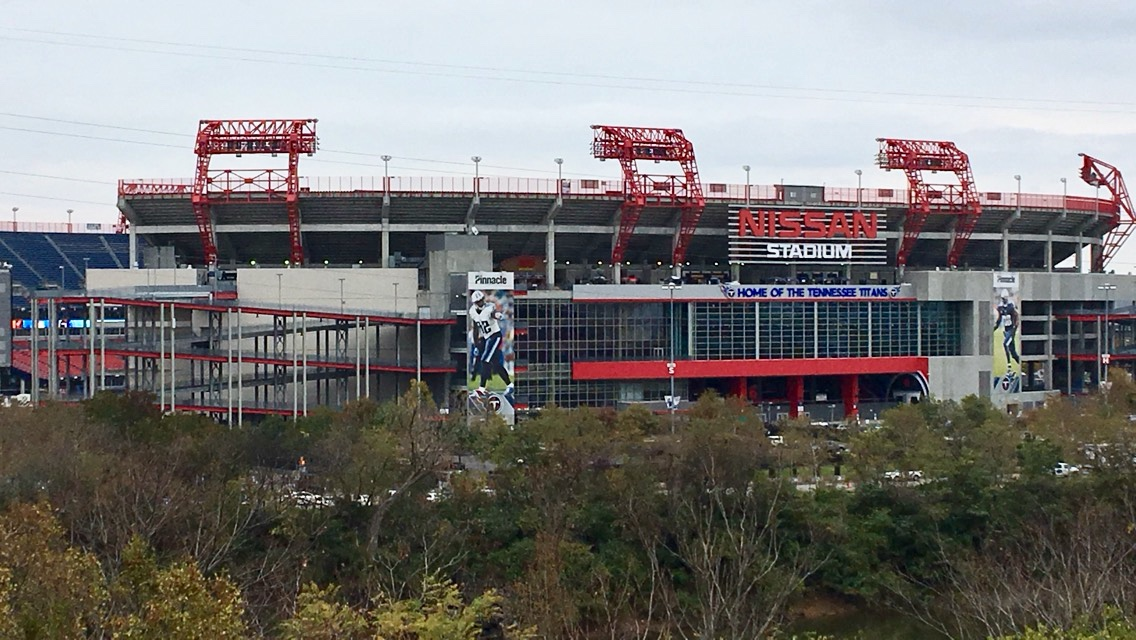
- Nissan Stadium in Nashville, Tennessee, hosted the Music City Bowl.
Texas A&M Aggies	Louisville Cardinals
(8–4)	(7–5)
SEC	ACC
21	27
Head coach: Kevin Sumlin	Head coach: Bobby Petrino
	1	2	3	4	Total
Texas A&M	7	7	0	7	21
Louisville	20	0	7	0	27
- Date: December 30, 2015
- Season: 2015
- Stadium: Nissan Stadium
- Location: Nashville, Tennessee
- MVP: Lamar Jackson
- Favorite: Texas A&M by 2½
- National anthem: Corrin Campbell and Danny Gokey
- Referee: Alan Eck (Big XII)
- Attendance: 50,478

United States TV coverage
- Network: ESPN; ESPN Radio
- Announcers: Tom Hart, Andre Ware, Laura Rutledge (ESPN); Mike Corey, Rene Ingoglia, Ian Fitzsimmons (ESPN Radio)

The 2015 Music City Bowl was an American college football bowl game played on December 30, 2015, at Nissan Stadium in Nashville, Tennessee. The 18th edition of the Music City Bowl began at approximately 6:00 p.m. CST and was broadcast nationally by ESPN. It featured the Texas A&M Aggies from the SEC, and the Louisville Cardinals from the ACC. It was one of the final 2015–16 bowl games of the 2015 FBS football season. The game was sponsored by the Franklin American Mortgage Company and is officially known as the Franklin American Mortgage Music City Bowl.

== Teams ==
The game is the fourth overall meeting between these two teams, with Texas A&M leading the series 3–0 going into the game. The last time these two teams met was in 1994 with Texas A&M beating Louisville with the score of 26–10. This is the first time the two teams have met as members of the SEC and ACC; their last meeting came when Texas A&M was a member of the Southwest Conference and Louisville was an independent.

== Game summary ==
=== Scoring summary ===
Scoring summary

Quarter	Time	Drive			Team	Scoring information	Score	
Quarter	Time	Plays	Yards	TOP	Team	Scoring information	TAMU	LOU
1	11:56	5	80	1:51	LOU	Lamar Jackson 6-yard touchdown run, John Wallace kick good	0	7
1	5:22	4	21	1:19	LOU	Micky Crum 2-yard touchdown reception from Lamar Jackson, John Wallace kick fail	0	13
1	2:25	8	70	2:50	TAMU	Tra Carson 9-yard touchdown run, Taylor Bertolet kick good	7	13
1	1:14	3	82	1:07	LOU	Lamar Jackson 61-yard touchdown run, John Wallace kick good	7	20
2	1:51	8	97	3:54	TAMU	Ricky Seals-Jones 4-yard touchdown reception from Jake Hubenak, Taylor Bertolet kick good	14	20
3	3:01	7	73	2:54	LOU	Keith Towbridge 17-yard touchdown reception from Lamar Jackson, John Wallace kick good	14	27
4	4:54	8	86	2:11	TAMU	Christian Kirk 29-yard touchdown reception from Jake Hubenak, Taylor Bertolet kick good	21	27
"TOP" = time of possession. For other American football terms, see Glossary of American football.							21	27

=== Statistics ===
Statistics	TAMU	LOU
First downs	25	21
Plays–yards	87–445	72–534
Rushes–yards	39–138	46–307
Passing yards	307	227
Passing: Comp–Att–Int	28–48–1	12–26–0
Time of possession	30:53	29:07
