= 2015 Florida Gators football team =

American college football season

2015 Florida Gators football

SEC Eastern Division champion

SEC Championship Game, L 15–29 vs. Alabama

Citrus Bowl, L 7–41 vs. Michigan
- Conference: Southeastern Conference
- Eastern Division

Ranking
- Coaches: No. 25
- AP: No. 25
- Record: 10–4 (7–1 SEC)
- Head coach: Jim McElwain (1st season)
- Offensive coordinator: Doug Nussmeier (1st season)
- Offensive scheme: Multiple
- Defensive coordinator: Geoff Collins (1st season)
- Co-defensive coordinator: Randy Shannon (1st season)
- Base defense: 4–3
- Home stadium: Ben Hill Griffin Stadium

2015 Southeastern Conference football standings
	Conf.			Overall
Team	W		L	W		L
Eastern Division
No. 25 Florida x	7	–	1	10	–	4
No. 22 Tennessee	5	–	3	9	–	4
Georgia	5	–	3	10	–	3
Vanderbilt	2	–	6	4	–	8
Kentucky	2	–	6	5	–	7
Missouri*	1	–	7	5	–	7
South Carolina	1	–	7	3	–	9
Western Division
No. 1 Alabama x$#^	7	–	1	14	–	1
No. 10 Ole Miss	6	–	2	10	–	3
Arkansas	5	–	3	8	–	5
No. 16 LSU *	5	–	3	9	–	3
Texas A&M	4	–	4	8	–	5
Mississippi State	4	–	4	9	–	4
Auburn	2	–	6	7	–	6
Championship: Alabama 29, Florida 15
# – College Football Playoff champion; ^ – College Football Playoff participant; $ – Conference champion; x – Division champion/co-champions; * LSU and Missouri vacated all wins due to NCAA violations.; Rankings from AP Poll

The 2015 Florida Gators football team represented the University of Florida in the sport of American football during the 2015 NCAA Division I FBS football season. The Gators competed in the Football Bowl Subdivision (FBS) of the National Collegiate Athletic Association (NCAA), and the Eastern Division of the Southeastern Conference (SEC). They played their home games at Ben Hill Griffin Stadium on the university's campus in Gainesville, Florida. The 2015 season was their first under head coach Jim McElwain. The Gators finished a surprising 7–1 in the SEC regular season, earning a berth in the 2015 SEC Championship Game, but ended the season with an overall record of 10–4 after losses in the SEC championship and Citrus Bowl.

== Team statistics ==
	Florida	Opponents
Scoring	318	215
Points per game	24.5	16.5
Points off turnovers	88	37
First downs	220	209
Rushing	88	81
Passing	116	88
Penalty	9	15
Rushing yards	1,659	1,568
Yards gained	2,076	2,063
Yards lost	417	495
Rushing attempts	483	462
Avg per rush	3.4	3.4
Avg per game	127.6	120.6
Touchdowns	19	10
Passing yards	2,744	2,272
Comp–Att–Int	219–380–8	211–394–14
Avg per pass	7.2	5.8
Avg per catch	12.5	10.8
Avg per game	211.1	174.8
Touchdowns	19	14
Total offensive yards	4,403	3,840
Total plays	863	856
Avg per play	5.1	4.5
Avg per game	338.7	295.4
Kick returns–yards	26–540	25–506
Avg yards	20.8	20.2
Punt returns–yards	32–446	32–118
Avg yards	13.9	3.7

	Florida	Opponents
Int returns–yards	14–247	8–2
Avg yards	17.6	0.2
Fumbles–lost	18–7	24–11
Penalties–yards	84–671	66–476
Avg per game	51.6	36.6
Punts–yards	80–3,549	88–3,883
Avg per punt	44.4	44.1
Net punt avg	41.9	38.6
Kickoffs–yards	63–4,021	51–3,242
Avg per kick	63.8	63.6
Net kick avg	41.9	40.7
Time of possession/game	31:43	28:17
3rd down conversions	68/193	61/197
4th down conversions	14/25	12/20
Sacks by–yards	40–294	43–250
Misc yards	0	25
Touchdowns scored	43	25
Field goals–attempts	7–17	13–18
On-side kicks–recoveries	0–0	0–1
Red zone trips	48	32
Scores	33	25
Touchdowns	28	15
PAT–attempts	35–40	24–25
Attendance	630,457	314,664
Games/avg per game	7/90,065	4/78,666
Neutral site games	2/79,974	

	1	2	3	4	OT	Total
Opponents	22	78	36	79	0	215
Florida	84	81	72	75	6	318

As of December 5, 2015

== Schedule ==
Florida announced their 2015 football schedule on October 14, 2014. The 2015 schedule consist of 7 home games, 4 away games and 1 neutral game in the regular season. The Gators hosted SEC foes Ole Miss, Tennessee, and Vanderbilt, and traveled to Kentucky, LSU, Missouri, and South Carolina. Florida had their 93rd meeting with Georgia in their annual neutral site rivalry game in Jacksonville, Florida.

The 2015 season was first season since the 2008 national championship season which Ole Miss returns to Ben Hill Griffin Stadium after an upset and the only Gator loss of the season. The Gators will host all four non-conference foes New Mexico State, East Carolina, Florida Atlantic, and rival Florida State.

Date	Time	Opponent	Rank	Site	TV	Result	Attendance
September 5	7:30 p.m.	New Mexico State*		Ben Hill Griffin Stadium; Gainesville, FL	SECN	W 61–13	90,227
September 12	7:00 p.m.	East Carolina*		Ben Hill Griffin Stadium; Gainesville, FL	ESPN2	W 31–24	88,034
September 19	7:30 p.m.	at Kentucky		Commonwealth Stadium; Lexington, KY (rivalry)	SECN	W 14–9	63,040
September 26	3:30 p.m.	Tennessee		Ben Hill Griffin Stadium; Gainesville, FL (rivalry / SEC Nation)	CBS	W 28–27	90,527
October 3	7:00 p.m.	No. 3 Ole Miss	No. 25	Ben Hill Griffin Stadium; Gainesville, FL	ESPN	W 38–10	90,585
October 10	7:30 p.m.	at Missouri	No. 11	Faurot Field; Columbia, MO	SECN	W 21–3	70,767
October 17	7:00 p.m.	at No. 6 LSU	No. 8	Tiger Stadium; Baton Rouge, LA (rivalry)	ESPN	L 28–35	102,321
October 31	3:30 p.m.	vs. Georgia	No. 11	EverBank Field; Jacksonville, FL (rivalry)	CBS	W 27–3	84,628
November 7	12:00 p.m.	Vanderbilt^{†}	No. 10	Ben Hill Griffin Stadium; Gainesville, FL	ESPN	W 9–7	90,061
November 14	12:00 p.m.	at South Carolina	No. 11	Williams-Brice Stadium; Columbia, SC	ESPN	W 24–14	78,536
November 21	12:00 p.m.	Florida Atlantic*	No. 8	Ben Hill Griffin Stadium; Gainesville, FL	SECN	W 20–14 ^{OT}	90,107
November 28	7:30 p.m.	No. 13 Florida State*	No. 12	Ben Hill Griffin Stadium; Gainesville, FL (rivalry)	ESPN	L 2–27	90,916‡
December 5	4:00 p.m.	vs. No. 2 Alabama	No. 18	Georgia Dome; Atlanta, GA (SEC Championship Game / rivalry)	CBS	L 15–29	75,320
January 1, 2016	1:00 p.m.	vs. No. 14 Michigan*	No. 19	Orlando Citrus Bowl; Orlando, FL (Citrus Bowl)	ABC	L 7–41	63,113
*Non-conference game; ^{†}Homecoming; Rankings from AP Poll and CFP Rankings after November 3 released prior to game; All times are in Eastern time

- ‡ New Ben Hill Griffin Stadium Attendance Record

Schedule source:

== Rankings ==
Ranking movements Legend: ██ Increase in ranking ██ Decrease in ranking RV = Received votes
	Week															
Poll	Pre	1	2	3	4	5	6	7	8	9	10	11	12	13	14	Final
AP	RV	RV	RV	RV	25	11	8	13	11	11	11	8	10	18	19	25
Coaches	RV	RV	RV	RV	23	12	11	14	12	12	10	8	9	15	18	25
CFP	Not released									10	11	8	12	18	19	Not released

== Game summaries ==
=== New Mexico State ===
New Mexico State Aggies at Florida Gators – Game summary

Quarter	1	2	3	4	Total
New Mexico State	0	13	0	0	13
Florida	7	27	13	14	61

at Ben Hill Griffin Stadium • Gainesville, Florida

- Date: September 5, 2015
- Game time: 7:40 p.m. EDT
- Game weather: Temperature: 78 °F (26 °C) • Wind: W at 1 mile per hour (1.6 km/h) • Weather: Partly cloudy
- Game attendance: 90,227
- Referee: Tom Ritter
- TV announcers (SEC Network): Brent Musburger and Jesse Palmer
- Boxscore

Game information

First Quarter

- Florida – Brandon Powell 37-yard pass from Treon Harris (Austin Hardin kick), 8:21

Second Quarter

- Florida – Kelvin Taylor 9-yard run (Austin Hardin kick), 14:06
- Florida – C'yontai Lewis 12-yard pass from Will Grier (Austin Hardin kick), 10:59
- New mexico state – Larry Rose III 8-yard run (Sy Slater kick), 6:28
- Florida – Will Grier 4-yard run (Austin Hardin kick), 3:17
- New mexico state – Teldrick Morgan 31-yard pass from Tyler Rogers, 1:46
- Florida – C'yontai Lewis 32-yard pass from Will Grier, 0:24

Third Quarter

- Florida – Austin Hardin 34-yard field goal, 9:25
- Florida – Jordan Cronkrite 3-yard run (Austin Hardin kick), 6:31
- Florida – Austin Hardin 36-yard field goal, 1:44

Fourth Quarter

- Florida – Jordan Scarlett 4-yard run, (Austin Hardin kick), 9:34
- Florida – C. J. Worton 3-yard pass from Treon Harris (Austin Hardin kick), 4:23

Passing leaders

- NMSU – Tyler Rogers – 14/27, 128 yards, 1 touchdown
- FLA – Treon Harris – 14/19, 215 yards, 2 touchdowns

Rushing leaders

- NMSU – Larry Rose III – 12 carries, 64 yards, 1 touchdown
- FLA – Kelvin Taylor – 8 carries, 54 yards, 1 touchdown

Receiving leaders

- NMSU – Teldrick Morgan – 3 receptions, 38 yards, 1 touchdown
- FLA – Demarcus Robinson – 5 receptions, 32 yards

Tackling leaders

- NMSU – Terrill Hanks and Jake Nwangwa – 7 tackles
- FLA – Alex Anzalone and Teez Tabor – 5 tackles

Overall record	Previous meeting	Previous winner
1–0	September 3, 1994	Florida, 70–21

Uniform Combination
Helmet	Jersey	Pants

Jim McElwain's tenure at Florida kicked off with a primetime game against the Sun Belt Conference's New Mexico State Aggies. The previous (and only other) Gators–Aggies encounter was in the 1994 season debut, where the no. 1 Gators opened the season with a commanding 70–21 victory over the Aggies. The Gators would finish that season 10–2–1 and capture a third SEC championship under Steve Spurrier. The 1994 Aggies would struggle to a 3–8 record.

On September 2, head coach Jim McElwain announced that sophomore Treon Harris would be the starting quarterback for the game, but also assured that redshirt freshman Will Grier would play quarterback at some point in the game.

The Gators' first drive of the season ended in a three-and-out. This was their only punt of the game, as the Gators scored on all but one of their succeeding drives—Will Grier lost a fumble behind the lin in the second quarter. Quarterbacks Treon Harris and Will Grier combined for 379 passing yards and five passing touchdowns in a promising display of offense, producing a total of 606 yards. Harris had more passing yards than Grier, although Grier did run for a touchdown in the second quarter. On the defensive side of the ball, the Gators defense held the Aggies to a mere 200 yards, allowing only a few big plays. Kicker Austin Hardin was 2/2 on field goals, and 7/8 on extra point kick attempts, as the Aggies were able to block the extra point attempt at the 0:24 mark of the second quarter. On the previous drive, the Gators blocked the Aggies' extra point kick attempt. The Gators were penalized only once for 10 yards, in contrast to the Gators' 59.2 penalty yards per game in 2014.

Jim McElwain broke a school record for points scored in a head coach's debut game, beating Ron Zook's 2002 record of 51 points against UAB.

=== East Carolina ===
East Carolina Pirates at Florida Gators – Game summary

Quarter	1	2	3	4	Total
East Carolina	7	0	7	10	24
Florida	10	0	14	7	31

at Ben Hill Griffin Stadium • Gainesville, Florida

- Date: September 12, 2015
- Game time: 7:10 p.m. EDT
- Game weather: Temperature: 75 °F (24 °C) • Wind: SSW at 5 miles per hour (8.0 km/h) • Weather: Overcast
- Game attendance: 88,034
- Referee: Matt Austin
- TV announcers (ESPN2): Mark Jones and Rod Gilmore
- Boxscore

Game information

First Quarter

- East carolina – Davon Grayson 31-yard pass from Blake Kemp (Davis Plowman kick), 11:26
- Florida – Austin Hardin 37-yard field goal, 4:08
- Florida – DeAndre Goolsby 32-yard pass from Will Grier (Austin Hardin kick), 0:49

Third Quarter

- East carolina – Isaiah Jones 27-yard pass from Blake Kemp (Davis Plowman kick), 10:43
- Florida – Demarcus Robinson 6-yard pass from Will Grier (Austin Hardin kick), 7:11
- Florida – Jalen Tabor 39-yard interception return (Austin Hardin kick), 3:32

Fourth Quarter

- East carolina – Davis Plowman 30-yard field goal, 12:25
- Florida – Kelvin Taylor 7-yard run (Austin Hardin kick), 6:57
- East carolina – Bryce Williams 7-yard pass from Blake Kemp (Davis Plowman kick), 3:04

Passing

- ECU – Blake Kemp – 34/54, 333 yards, 3 touchdowns, 1 interception
- FLA – Will Grier – 10/17, 151 yards, 2 touchdowns, 1 interception

Rushing

- ECU – Chris Hairston – 17 carries, 15 yards
- FLA – Kelvin Taylor – 16 carries, 55 yards

Receiving

- ECU – Isaiah Jones – 14 receptions, 135 yards, 1 touchdown
- FLA – Demarcus Robinson – 5 receptions, 55 yards, 1 touchdown

Tackling

- ECU – Zeek Bigger – 7 tackles
- FLA – Jarrad Davis – 10 tackles

Overall record	Previous meeting	Previous winner
2–0	January 3, 2015	Florida, 28–20

Uniform Combination
Helmet	Jersey	Pants

The Gators face the Pirates a mere 8 months following their previous encounter at the 2015 Birmingham Bowl. The Gators and Pirates played a close first quarter in Birmingham, but the Gators regained their lead early in the second quarter, and added to it later on. The Pirates were not able to muster a sufficient response, and the Gators went on to win 28–20. The Gators and Pirates also played at Florida Field in 1983 as the no. 6 and undefeated Gators played a close game, winning 24–17 on Homecoming day. The Gators finished the 1983 season 9–2–1.
Head coach Jim McElwain announced during the week that redshirt freshman Will Grier would get his first career college start, and Treon Harris would come off the bench. This is a script flip from last week, when Treon Harris got the start before Will Grier played for about half the game. Junior defensive back Vernon Hargreaves III suffered a leg injury at practice during the week, and would not dress for the game.

Much like their previous 2015 meeting at the Birmingham Bowl, East Carolina played a close game against the Gators, as the game had a total of four lead changes. In the first half, kicker Austin Hardin missed 2 field goals. After falling behind 10–14 early in the third quarter, Florida seemed to be pulling away as they led 31–17, however East Carolina would score a touchdown with 3:04 remaining in the game. On the ensuing possession, the Gators went three-and-out, and punted the ball back to East Carolina, who would get well into Florida territory before quarterback Blake Kemp fumbled a pass attempt, which was recovered by defensive end Alex McCalister, who would have scored had his teammate, Jarrad Davis, not tackled him. Florida was able to kneel to run off the final 12 seconds. Head coach Jim McElwain called the Gators' performance "embarrassing," not only speaking of the several missed opportunities to put points on the board, but also of the 12 penalties totaling 105 yards, including two unsportsmanlike conduct fouls following scores. McElwain added that his team "didn't deserve to win the game," and addressed the issue of being penalized 12 times, saying "this is not how it's going to be around here anymore." The 12 Florida penalties sharply contrast last week's season opener, where the Gators showed above average discipline, as they were penalized only once.

=== Kentucky ===
Florida Gators at Kentucky Wildcats – Game summary

Quarter	1	2	3	4	Total
Florida	7	7	0	0	14
Kentucky	3	0	0	6	9

at Commonwealth Stadium • Lexington, Kentucky

- Date: September 19, 2015
- Game time: 7:39 p.m. EDT
- Game weather: Temperature: 67 °F (19 °C) • Wind: NNW at 8 miles per hour (13 km/h) • Weather: Mostly cloudy
- Game attendance: 63,040
- Referee: John McDaid
- TV announcers (SEC Network): Brent Musburger and Jesse Palmer
- Boxscore

Game information

First Quarter

- Florida – Will Grier 1-yard run (Austin Hardin kick), 8:48
- Kentucky – Austin MacGinnis 29-yard field goal, 2:04

Second Quarter

- Florida – Kelvin Taylor 3-yard run (Austin Hardin kick), 0:14

Fourth Quarter

- Kentucky – Austin MacGinnis 22-yard field goal, 14:50
- Kentucky – Austin MacGinnis 45-yard field goal, 10:57

Passing

- FLA – Will Grier – 13/22, 125 yards, 1 interception
- KEN – Patrick Towles – 8/24, 126 yards, 2 interceptions

Rushing

- FLA – Will Grier – 12 carries, 61 yards, 1 touchdown
- KEN – Stanley Williams – 16 carries, 80 yards

Receiving

- FLA – Jake Mcgee – 3 receptions, 30 yards
- KEN – Dorian Baker – 4 receptions, 38 yards

Tackling

- FLA – Jarrad Davis – 10 tackles
- KEN – Khalid Henderson – 9 tackles

Overall record	Previous meeting	Previous winner
48–17	September 13, 2014	Florida, 36–30 ^{3OT}

Uniform Combination
Helmet	Jersey	Pants

Florida traveled to Lexington for this year's edition of the annual intra-divisional series. Kentucky was hoping to avenge a victory against the Gators for the first time since November 15, 1986. In last year's primetime matchup, the Gators and Wildcats played a triple-overtime thriller under the lights at The Swamp. Kentucky scored a game-tying 51-yard field goal with 3:52 left in the fourth quarter. Florida later missed a game-winning field goal, and sent the game to overtime. Florida eventually scored the game-winning touchdown in the third overtime period, thus continuing Kentucky's losing streak against Florida.
For the third consecutive game, Florida would plan on playing both Will Grier and Treon Harris during the game, and would place Grier in the starting position for the second consecutive game. Vernon Hargreaves was upgraded to questionable on Wednesday, and later listed as probable. Head coach Jim McElwain was hoping for gameplay resembling that of the season debut against New Mexico State, as Kentucky is coming off a 26–22 victory at South Carolina; McElwain says of Kentucky "This team we're playing is not your same old Kentucky ... These guys are really good."

The Gators played another tight game for the second straight year, holding a mere 7–3 lead through the first quarter. The Gators scored another touchdown in the second quarter to extend their lead to a comfortable 14–3. Florida could not score for the remainder of the game, however their defense was able to hold Kentucky's potent offense led by Patrick Towles, one of the SEC's top returning quarterbacks, to only two additional field goals, and intercepted a desperation pass on 4th & 27 to secure the result and kneel off the remaining time. Starting quarterback Will Grier played for the entire game, and was the team's top rusher with 61 yards. Treon Harris did warm up on the sideline when Grier's offense seemed to dwindle, but Jim McElwain asked if Grier could continue, which he affirmed. McElwain called his first SEC victory a "heck of a road win against a team that's going to win a lot of games in this league and is getting better and better."

With the victory, Florida extended their winning streak against Kentucky to 29 games, the nation's longest active win streak against an annual opponent. The all-time record is Notre Dame's 43-game winning streak against Navy from 1964 to 2006.

=== Tennessee ===
Tennessee Volunteers at Florida Gators – Game summary

Quarter	1	2	3	4	Total
Tennessee	7	10	3	7	27
Florida	7	0	7	14	28

at Ben Hill Griffin Stadium • Gainesville, Florida

- Date: September 26, 2015
- Game time: 3:40 p.m. EDT
- Game weather: Temperature: 87 °F (31 °C) • Wind: ESE at 5 miles per hour (8.0 km/h) • Weather: Sunny, 62% humidity
- Game attendance: 90,527
- Referee: David Smith
- TV announcers (CBS): Verne Lundquist and Gary Danielson
- Boxscore

Game information

First Quarter

- Florida – Kelvin Taylor 5-yard run (Jorge Powell kick), 10:23
- Tennessee – Joshua Dobbs 58-yard pass from Jauan Jennings (Aaron Medley kick), 5:07

Second Quarter

- Tennessee – Jalen Hurd 1-yard run (Aaron Medley kick), 8:18
- Tennessee – Aaron Medley 34-yard field goal, 3:13

Third Quarter

- Tennessee – Aaron Medley 37-yard field goal, 11:07
- Florida – Kelvin Taylor 4-yard run (Jorge Powell kick), 5:42

Fourth Quarter

- Tennessee – Jalen Hurd 10-yard run (Aaron Medley kick), 10:19
- Florida – Brandon Powell 5-yard pass from Will Grier (Jorge Powell kick), 4:09
- Florida – Antonio Callaway 63-yard pass from Will Grier (Jorge Powell kick), 1:26

Passing

- TENN – Joshua Dobbs – 10/17, 83 yards
- FLA – Will Grier – 23/42, 283 yards, 2 touchdowns, 1 interception

Rushing

- TENN – Joshua Dobbs – 18 carries, 136 yards
- FLA – Kelvin Taylor – 19 carries, 102 yards, 2 touchdowns

Receiving

- TENN – Joshua Dobbs – 1 reception, 58 yards, 1 touchdown
- FLA – Antonio Callaway – 5 receptions, 112 yards, 1 touchdown

Tackling

- TENN – Jalen Reeves-Maybin – 8 tackles
- FLA – Keanu Neal – 13 tackles

Overall record	Previous meeting	Previous winner
25–19	October 4, 2014	Florida, 10–9

Uniform Combination
Helmet	Jersey	Pants

Jim McElwain would try to lead the Gators to an eleventh consecutive victory – the longest winning streak of the rivalry – against a promising Volunteer team, whose turnaround season last year – which culminated with their first bowl victory in six years – sparked a frenzy of high-prospect recruiting for this season. Last year's game saw a fourth quarter comeback by the Gators, resolving a 0–9 deficit in the fourth quarter.
During the week it was announced that Will Grier would make his third consecutive start. He would be expected to play the entire game due to Treon Harris being unavailable due to a one-game suspension. Josh Grady was promoted in the depth chart for this game in Harris's absence.

The Gators would score a touchdown on their second drive of the game, however the Volunteers scored three drives later, and the first quarter ended at a 7–7 tie. Tennessee would score an additional 10 points in the second quarter, sending the Gators to halftime trailing 7–17. Tennessee scored a field goal on the opening series of the third quarter to extend to a 20–7 lead. Florida would score later in the third quarter as a result of a Kelvin Taylor touchdown run, pulling the Gators within a touchdown of the Volunteers. Tennessee, however, earned a touchdown to finish a 70-yard, 7:26 drive with 10:19 in the fourth quarter. Head coach Butch Jones elected to kick a one-point try, rather than going for a two-point try that would have made given the Volunteers a 14-point lead. This decision would prove fatal for the Volunteers, as Florida scored a touchdown of their own on the ensuing possession, and Tennessee would punt the ball back to Florida on their following possession with 2:18 remaining in the game. The Gators engineered a 52-second drive that culminated with a 63-yard touchdown pass from Grier to Antonio Callaway on 4th-and-14. The Volunteers got the ball back with 1:25 remaining in the game, and drove down the field to set up a 55-yard, game-winning field goal attempt with 3 seconds remaining. Placekicker Aaron Medley missed wide right, allowing the Gators to hold on for a second consecutive one-point victory over the Volunteers.
The Gators extended their perfect record on fourth down conversion attempts, as they were 5/5 on fourth down, including 3/3 in the fourth quarter.

=== Ole Miss ===
Ole Miss at Florida Gators – Game summary

Quarter	1	2	3	4	Total
No. 3 Ole Miss	0	0	3	7	10
No. 25 Florida	13	12	0	13	38

at Ben Hill Griffin Stadium • Gainesville, Florida

- Date: October 3, 2015
- Game time: 7:05 p.m. EDT
- Game weather: Temperature: 70 °F (21 °C) • Wind: W at 5 miles per hour (8.0 km/h) • Weather: Cloudy
- Game attendance: 90,585
- Referee: John McDaid
- TV announcers (ESPN): Brad Nessler and Todd Blackledge
- Boxscore

Game information

First Quarter

- Florida – Demarcus Robinson 36-yard pass from Will Grier (Jorge Powell kick), 9:09
- Florida – Jake McGee 2-yard pass from Will Grier, 6:48

Second Quarter

- Florida – Brandon Powell 77-yard pass from Will Grier, 6:53
- Florida – Antonio Callaway 15-yard pass from Will Grier, 0:20

Third Quarter

- Ole miss – Gary Wunderlich 22-yard field goal, 5:25

Fourth Quarter

- Florida – Jorge Powell 31-yard field goal, 12:46
- Florida – Jorge Powell 22-yard field goal, 6:39
- Florida – Jordan Cronkrite 1-yard run (Jorge Powell kick), 6:20
- Ole miss – Markell Pack 7-yard pass from Chad Kelly (Gary Wunderlich kick), 4:04

Passing

- MISS – Chad Kelly – 26/40, 259 yards, 1 touchdown, 1 interception
- FLA – Will Grier – 24/29, 271 yards, 4 touchdowns

Rushing

- MISS – Chad Kelly – 15 carries, 40 yards
- FLA – Kelvin Taylor – 27 carries, 83 yards

Receiving

- MISS – Laquon Treadwell – 5 receptions, 42 yards
- FLA – Demarcus Robinson – 8 receptions, 98 yards, 1 touchdown

Tackling

- MISS – Trae Elston – 10 tackles
- FLA – Antonio Morrison – 13 tackles

Overall record	Previous meeting	Previous winner
10–12–1	September 27, 2008	Ole Miss, 31–30

Uniform Combination
Helmet	Jersey	Pants

Ole Miss was the only team able to upset reigning Heisman Trophy winner Tim Tebow and the eventual national champion 2008 Gators. The Rebels blocked a game-tying extra point with 3:28 left in the game to hold a 31–30 lead. The Gators were able to regain possession with 2:05 left in the game, but turned over on downs after Tebow was stopped short of the line to gain on 4th & 1 with 41 seconds left. They have not played each other since.
The no. 3 Rebels enter the Swamp with a 4–0 record, having won in upset fashion at no. 2 Alabama 43–37. In last week's game, Ole Miss defeated Vanderbilt 27–16, although they entered the game as 26 1/2-point favorites. During a portion of the third quarter, the score was tied at 13.

Ole Miss entered as 7-point favorites against the Gators, but quickly fell behind after Florida put on an offensive attack led by Will Grier's four touchdown passes in the first 30 minutes of play, giving the Gators a 25–0 halftime lead. The Rebels offense was not so much stagnant as the Gators defense was dominant. Ole Miss made their first trip to the red zone early in the second quarter, but the Gators attacked the Rebels defensively, forcing Gary Wunderlich to attempt a 29-yard field goal, which sailed wide right. Ole Miss opened the second half with a drive that lasted 9:35, but Florida's defense forced Ole Miss to settle for a 22-yard field goal, putting Ole Miss on the board. Ole Miss fumbled the ball after 3 plays on their next drive, and Florida converted with a field goal early in the fourth quarter. After a pair of punts, Vernon Hargreaves returned an interception to the Ole Miss 5-yard line, but Florida once again settled for a field goal following a three-and-out. Ole Miss would fumble the ball only 16 seconds later, however, setting up 1st & goal from the Ole Miss 1-yard line, leading to a one play touchdown drive for the Gators, extending to a 5 touchdown lead. Ole Miss would score on their ensuing drive, before Florida took the final snaps of the game to seal the primetime upset at 38–10.

Florida is 5–0 for the first time since the 2012 season, and holds the sole position at the top of the SEC Eastern Division standings after no. 8 Georgia fell to no. 13 Alabama at home. Mississippi's first loss of the season leaves only two teams with perfect records in the SEC Western Division – no. 14 Texas A&M and no. 9 LSU, who the Gators will play on October 17 in Baton Rouge.

=== Missouri ===
Florida Gators at Missouri Tigers – Game summary

Quarter	1	2	3	4	Total
No. 11 Florida	14	0	7	0	21
Missouri	3	0	0	0	3

at Faurot Field • Columbia, Missouri

- Date: October 10, 2015
- Game time: 7:39 p.m. EDT
- Game weather: Temperature: 64 °F (18 °C) • Wind: S at 5 miles per hour (8.0 km/h) • Weather: Sunny and clear
- Game attendance: 70,767
- Referee: Hubert Owens
- TV announcers (SEC Network): Brent Musburger and Jesse Palmer
- Boxscore

Game information

First Quarter

- Florida – Kelvin Taylor 1-yard run (Jorge Powell kick), 9:31
- Missouri – Andrew Baggett 21-yard field goal, 7:33
- Florida – Kelvin Taylor 1-yard run (Jorge Powell kick), 1:09

Third Quarter

- Florida – Teez Tabor 40-yard interception return (Jorge Powell kick), 6:25

Passing

- FLA – Will Grier – 20/33, 208 yards
- MIZZ – Drew Lock – 16/39, 151 yards, 2 interceptions

Rushing

- FLA – Kelvin Taylor – 28 carries, 99 yards, 2 touchdowns
- MIZZ – Russell Hansbrough – 9 carries, 74 yards

Receiving

- FLA – Demarcus Robinson – 6 receptions, 79 yards
- MIZZ – Ish Witter – 4 receptions, 29 yards

Tackling

- FLA – Marcus Maye and Antonio Morrison – 6 tackles
- MIZZ – Kentrell Brothers – 15 tackles

Overall record	Previous meeting	Previous winner
1–2	October 18, 2014	Missouri, 42–13

Uniform Combination
Helmet	Jersey	Pants

Florida would play at Faurot Field for only the second time as Missouri plays a fourth game against Florida since joining the SEC in 2012. Missouri was sitting on a two-game winning streak against the Gators, defeating a historically underperforming Gator team in 2013, and again in 2014, where Florida fell behind by six touchdowns before entering Treon Harris in the third quarter, who threw for a touchdown and ran for another, allowing the Gators to avoid a primetime shutout at The Swamp.
Missouri's true-freshman quarterback Drew Lock would make his second start in place of suspended senior quarterback Maty Mauk

Following a 7–3 score resulting from the teams' opening drives, Florida scored a second touchdown in the first quarter, pulling to a 14–3 lead. The second quarter saw a pair of missed field goals by both teams; Florida's field goal attempt was set up by a Marcus Maye interception. Both offenses in the second half were rather stagnant, as each offensive series ended with either a punt or turnover on downs, with the exception of a Teez Tabor interception that was returned for a 40-yard touchdown to extend Florida's lead to 18 points, ultimately resulting in the game's final score of 21–3. Florida's defense held Missouri's offense to 1-for-14 on third downs, with the Tigers' lone third down conversion occurring with 36 seconds remaining in the game.

Florida's defense has yet to give up a touchdown in their road games. Missouri head coach Gary Pinkel remarked of the Gators' defense ""They out-executed us," and "They are a really good defensive football team." He also said "We just made mistakes they didn't make. Obviously, offensively we're still having some problems."
With a 6–0 start, Jim McElwain is the first Gators coach since Galen Hall in 1984 to win his first six games.

=== LSU ===
Florida Gators at LSU Tigers – Game summary

Quarter	1	2	3	4	Total
No. 8 Florida	7	7	14	0	28
No. 6 LSU	0	28	0	7	35

at Tiger Stadium • Baton Rouge, Louisiana

- Date: October 17, 2015
- Game time: 7:10 p.m. EDT
- Game weather: Temperature: 74 °F (23 °C) • Wind: NNW at 6 miles per hour (9.7 km/h) • Weather: Partly cloudy
- Game attendance: 102,321
- Referee: Matt Loeffler
- TV announcers (ESPN): Brad Nessler and Todd Blackledge
- Boxscore

Game information

First Quarter

- Florida – Jake McGee 4-yard pass from Treon Harris (Jorge Powell kick), 10:13

Second Quarter

- LSU – Leonard Fournette 2-yard run (Trent Domingue kick), 12:23
- LSU – Malachi Dupre 9-yard pass from Brandon Harris (Trent Domingue kick), 5:00
- LSU – Leonard Fournette 6-yard run (Trent Domingue kick), 2:24
- Florida – Jake McGee 19-yard pass from Treon Harris (Austin Hardin kick), 1:34
- LSU – Malachi Dupre 50-yard pass from Brandon Harris (Trent Domingue kick), 0:15

Third Quarter

- Florida – Kelvin Taylor 2-yard run (Austin Hardin kick), 8:03
- Florida – Antonio Callaway 72-yard punt return (Austin Hardin kick), 1:04

Fourth Quarter

- LSU – Trent Domingue 16-yard run (Trent Domingue kick), 10:40

Passing

- FLA – Treon Harris – 17/32, 271 yards, 2 touchdowns
- LSU – Brandon Harris – 13/19, 202 yards, 2 touchdowns

Rushing

- FLA – Kelvin Taylor – 15 carries, 25 yards, 1 touchdown
- LSU – Leonard Fournette – 31 carries, 180 yards, 2 touchdowns

Receiving

- FLA – Antonio Callaway – 3 receptions, 100 yards
- LSU – Malachi Dupre – 4 receptions, 115 yards, 2 touchdowns

Tackling

- FLA – Keanu Neal – 14 tackles
- LSU – Deion Jones and Louis Neal – 10 tackles

Overall record	Previous meeting	Previous winner
31–27–3	October 11, 2014	LSU, 30–27

Uniform Combination
Helmet	Jersey	Pants

Florida would enter Death Valley hoping to avenge the previous two years' losses, with last year's game resulting in another late-night thriller at The Swamp. Florida went into halftime with a 17–14 lead. The two teams played a close second half, until LSU's Colby Delahoussaye made a 50-yard field goal with 3 seconds left in the game, allowing LSU to take a 30–27 victory.
Treon Harris would make his second start of the season following Will Grier's tearful announcement of his suspension on Monday due to testing positive for an NCAA-banned supplement. Entering the game, Harris was 5–2 as a starting quarterback, as he was the starter for the last six games of the 2014 season, and entered boasting 1,288 passing yards with a 53.6 percent completion rate, and 401 yards with a 4.7 yard average per carry. The offense would need to adapt to Harris's skill set, as he is less of a dropback passer than Grier, meaning the offense will be more oriented around designed runs, zone reads and moving pockets. McElwain said of the quarterback situation "Now it's Treon's opportunity to take the reins and run with it. He'll do a great job."

After receiving the first half kickoff, Florida gained a first down on their first play from scrimmage before going three-and-out. However, the punt was muffed by LSU's Tre'Davious White, and Florida's Nick Washington recovered at the 13-yard line. Facing 4th-and-1 at the LSU 4-yard line, Florida elected to go for the first down from scrimmage, doing that and more as Treon Harris completed a pass to Jake McGee for a touchdown. On LSU's ensuing drive, Leonard Fournette earned his team a first down on their first play from scrimmage, but was forced to punt three plays later just as the Gators did. The remaining drives that ended in the first quarter resulted in punts. LSU was in possession of the ball to begin the second quarter, and capped off an 11-play, 88-yard drive with a 2-yard run by Fournette to tie the game at 7. After a Florida three-and-out, LSU capped off another long drive with another touchdown, this time from a 9-yard connection from Brandon Harris to Malachi Dupre. Florida again went three-and-out on the following drive, and LSU again scored a touchdown thanks to a 6-yard run by Fournette, set up by a 52-yard flea flicker on the previous play. Florida, however, would manage to score in under a minute to reduce LSU's lead back to a lone touchdown. LSU's ensuing drive, however, once again ended in a touchdown following another big Harris–Dupre connection, and Florida would go into the locker room trailing 14–28. LSU scored a touchdown on each of their second quarter drives.
LSU received the second half kickoff, but went three-and-out. Florida's ensuing drive resulted in a touchdown, following a 2-yard run by Kelvin Taylor, which capped off a 10-play, 66-yard drive that took over five minutes. The following three drives ended in punts; LSU's first three drives of the second half would result in three-and-outs. LSU's third punt of the second half was returned 72 yards to the end zone by Antonio Callaway, tying the game at 28 near the end of the third quarter. Beginning the fourth quarter with possession, LSU was driving at midfield. LSU eventually drove to the Florida 16-yard line, and set up for a tiebreaking 33-yard field goal attempt. Kicker Trent Domingue, however, would score seven points instead of the expected three, as holder Brad Kragthorpe threw a lateral to Domingue, who, after bobbling the ball, ran for 16 yards to score what would become the game's final touchdown. Florida's final two drives would end in turnovers on downs, as LSU held the Gators from scoring again, securing a 35–28 victory.

Jim McElwain said of the fake field goal "They made a helluva play. Give them credit," adding "It's kind of a badge of honor. It took a fake field goal to beat us. That's all right." Many praised the Gators' exceptional play considering the news of Will Grier's suspension that broke less than a week before the game, and that it came down to a fake field goal for one of the better teams in the country to defeat the Gators at one of the nation's most challenging venues.

=== Georgia ===
Georgia Bulldogs vs. Florida Gators – Game summary

Quarter	1	2	3	4	Total
Georgia	0	0	3	0	3
No. 11 Florida	6	14	0	7	27

at EverBank Field • Jacksonville, Florida

- Date: October 31, 2015
- Game time: 3:40 p.m. EDT
- Game weather: Temperature: 81 °F (27 °C) • Wind: W at 8 miles per hour (13 km/h) • Weather: Sunny, 50% humidity
- Game attendance: 84,628
- Referee: Tom Ritter
- TV announcers (CBS): Verne Lundquist and Gary Danielson
- Boxscore

Game information

First Quarter

- Florida – Nick Washington 0-yard fumble recovery, 0:00

Second Quarter

- Florida – Antonio Callaway 66-yard pass from Treon Harris (Austin Hardin kick), 5:06
- Florida – Kelvin Taylor 3-yard run (Austin Hardin kick), 2:39

Third Quarter

- Georgia – Marshall Morgan 26-yard field goal, 10:21

Fourth Quarter

- Florida – Kelvin Taylor 16-yard run (Austin Hardin kick), 7:10

Passing

- UGA – Faton Bauta – 15/33, 154 yards, 4 interceptions
- FLA – Treon Harris – 8/19, 155 yards, 1 touchdown

Rushing

- UGA – Sony Michel – 13 carries, 45 yards
- FLA – Kelvin Taylor – 25 carries, 121 yards, 2 touchdowns

Receiving

- UGA – Malcolm Mitchell – 4 receptions, 60 yards
- FLA – Antonio Callaway – 3 receptions, 110 yards, 1 touchdown

Tackling

- UGA – Davin Bellamy – 7 tackles
- FLA – Jarrad Davis and Antonio Morrison – 6 tackles

Overall record	Previous meeting	Previous winner
41–49–2 (per Florida); 41–50–2 (per Georgia)	November 1, 2014	Florida, 38–20

Uniform Combination
Helmet	Jersey	Pants

One of only two neutral-site SEC series (Arkansas–Texas A&M), Florida and Georgia have played a storied series since 1906 (though Georgia contends that they first met in 1904). The game has been held in Jacksonville since 1933, only playing a home-and-home in 1994 and 1995 due to construction of Jacksonville Municipal Stadium. Unranked Florida upset no. 9 Georgia 38–20 in last year's game. Florida fell behind early, finishing the first quarter down 0–7, before scoring 31 straight points as Georgia was unable to keep up, managing only 13 points in the fourth quarter as the Gators upset the Bulldogs, winning their first game in the rivalry since an overtime contest in 2010.
Jim McElwain spent the bye week by fixing the mistakes he saw in the loss to LSU, including bad timing on bad passes, missed tackles, and blown coverage assignments.

Florida would receive the first half kickoff, and put on a 10-play, 61-yard drive, and set up for a 45-yard field goal attempt, however Austin Hardin would miss wide right. Both teams' offenses would put on a rather stale performance for the rest of the first quarter—four of the following six possessions ended in three-and-outs; five ended in punts. Georgia committed the first turnover of the game from a Faton Bauta pass intercepted by Marcus Maye. Florida could not capitalize on the turnover, and was forced to punt. Georgia's Reggie Davis, however, who was deep to receive, muffed the punt at the 5-yard line, and the ball rolled into the end zone where it was fallen upon by Nick Washington for a touchdown. The extra point try was blocked, and Florida was forced to kickoff from their own 20-yard line to begin the second quarter due to a personal foul that occurred on the Georgia return. Georgia's ensuing drive ended in a turnover on downs, and Florida gained possession at their own 39-yard line. Florida would punt after four plays, forcing Georgia to start at their own 3-yard line. Georgia managed to drive to their own 35-yard line, before punting back to Florida. The Gators then went 79 yards in five plays to score a touchdown following a 66-yard pass from Treon Harris to Antonio Callaway. Austin Hardin would make the extra point on this try, and Florida took a 13–0 lead just over halfway through the second quarter. Faton Bauta threw his second interception on the third play of the ensuing possessions, which was returned to the 5-yard line. Florida would score a touchdown two plays later. Georgia punted after a three-and-out on the ensuing possession, and Florida ran off the final 1:20 of the first half to go into the locker room with a 20-point lead.
Georgia received the second half kickoff, and punted after going three-and-out. Florida, however, would give the ball back to Georgia following a turnover of their own when Davin Bellamy forced Treon Harris to fumble, and recovered. Georgia capitalized on the turnover when Marshall Morgan kicked a 26-yard field goal, cutting Florida's advantage to 17. Florida punted after six plays, and Georgia drove to their own 48-yard line before turning over on downs. Florida would then go on a six-minute drive, but turned over on downs at the Georgia 11-yard line. During the drive, Florida running back Jordan Cronkrite was ejected for a targeting foul. Georgia responded by driving 86 yards in 9 plays to get to the Florida 3-yard line, but Faton Bauta threw his third interception of the game when Keanu Neal caught a tipped pass in the end zone for a touchback. Florida capitalized on their fourth gained turnover by reaching the end zone in just over three minutes. Georgia's final drive of the game began with 7:10 remaining, and ended after five plays when Faton Bauta threw his fourth interception. Florida was able to run out the remaining time, earning Jim McElwain's first win over bitter rival Georgia 27–3.

Florida was able to all but clinch the outright SEC Eastern Division championship—Vanderbilt was the only team that could possibly win a tiebreaker against Florida. The Gators would need a win the next week to officially secure their berth in Atlanta.
By virtue of Jordan Cronkrite's ejection for targeting, he would be suspended for the first half of the following game against Vanderbilt.

=== Vanderbilt ===
Vanderbilt Commodores at Florida Gators – Game summary

Quarter	1	2	3	4	Total
Vanderbilt	0	7	0	0	7
No. 11 Florida	6	0	0	3	9

at Ben Hill Griffin Stadium • Gainesville, Florida

- Date: November 7, 2015
- Game time: 12:01 p.m. EST
- Game weather: Temperature: 84 °F (29 °C) • Wind: S at 5 miles per hour (8.0 km/h) • Weather: Sunny, 65% humidity
- Game attendance: 90,061
- Referee: Brad Rogers
- TV announcers (ESPN): Beth Mowins and Anthony Becht
- Boxscore

Game information

First Quarter

- Florida – Kelvin Taylor 3-yard run, 6:16

Second Quarter

- Vanderbilt – Ralph Webb 74-yard run (Hayden Lekacz kick), 0:48

Fourth Quarter

- Florida – Austin Hardin 43-yard field goal, 2:22

Passing

- VAN – Johnny McCrary – 3/14, 30 yards
- FLA – Treon Harris – 12/24, 158 yards, 1 interception

Rushing

- VAN – Ralph Webb – 22 carries, 118 yards, 1 touchdown
- FLA – Kelvin Taylor – 17 carries, 47 yards, 1 touchdown

Receiving

- VAN – Sam Dobbs – 1 reception, 21 yards
- FLA – Demarcus Robinson – 9 receptions, 106 yards

Tackling

- VAN – Zach Cunningham – 9 tackles
- FLA – Bryan Cox Jr. – 9 tackles

Overall record	Previous meeting	Previous winner
36–10–2	November 8, 2014	Florida, 34–10

Uniform Combination
Helmet	Jersey	Pants

Florida and Vanderbilt have split their last two meetings; 2013 saw Vanderbilt defeat Florida at The Swamp for the first time since 1945, and ending the Gators' 22-game winning streak against the Commodores. In last year's matchup, the Gators and Commodores played a tight first quarter as they split two touchdowns, however Florida managed 10 points in the second quarter to take a 17–7 halftime lead. The Gators resumed their scoring routine after a scoreless third quarter, scoring 17 points in the fourth quarter, holding Vanderbilt to a mere field goal.
Running back Jordan Cronkrite would be ineligible for the first half of the game by virtue of his ejection due to targeting in the previous game against Georgia.
Florida entered the game with one win away from winning the SEC Eastern Division championship outright and securing a berth in the SEC Championship Game.

Florida's Brandon Powell returned the opening kickoff for 71 yards to the Vanderbilt 23-yard line. Jordan Scarlett picked up 20 more yards on the first scrimmage play, setting up 1st-and-goal at the 3-yard line in only 28 seconds. Florida's opening possession, however, would stall when the Gators failed to score after playing from scrimmage on fourth down instead of attempting a field goal. Vanderbilt was only able to reach their own 17-yard line before punting. The Gators put on another good kick return with Antonio Callaway returning the punt for 27 yards to Vanderbilt's 41-yard line. Six plays later, the Gators found the end zone following a 3-yard run by Kelvin Taylor. However, for the second consecutive game, Florida would fail to convert the extra point try, when walk-on Neil MacInnes missed the uprights. Vanderbilt's possession began at their own 25-yard line following a touchback by Austin Hardin. Following a six-play drive that consisted of five running plays, the Commodores punted from Florida's 37-yard line. Florida continued their possession into the second quarter, and drove to the Vanderbilt 26-yard line before facing fourth down. The Gators lined up to attempt a field goal, however holder Johnny Townsend passed the ball up the middle of the field where Cece Jefferson completed it past the line to gain, but Vanderbilt's Caleb Azubike would force a fumble which Vanderbilt would recover at their own 19-yard line. Vanderbilt failed to capitalize on the turnover, as they punted after going three-and-out. Antonio Callaway returned the punt once again into Commodore territory at the 45-yard line. Facing 3rd-and-13, Treon Harris would rush over the left end past the line to gain to the 18-yard line, but Vanderbilt was able to force another fumble, which was recovered by Zach Cunningham, resulting in Florida's second consecutive drive ending in a turnover. Vanderbilt, however, once again would fail to capitalize on the turnover, and punted back to Florida after gaining five yards in 6 plays. The next two possessions resulted in punts following three-and-outs. Florida gained possession after Vanderbilt's three-and-out at their own 36-yard line with 3:26 remaining in the second quarter. They would drive into Vanderbilt territory before they committed their third turnover of the second quarter when Treon Harris threw a pass which was intercepted Ryan White at the 26-yard line. With 59 seconds remaining, Vanderbilt had Ralph Webb run a draw play, which went 74 yards for a touchdown. Hayden Lekacz converted the extra point try to take a one-point lead over the no. 11 Gators. Florida took over possession at their own 25-yard line with 48 seconds remaining, but failed to reach midfield and punted to Ryan White at the 6-yard line, and the Commodores kneeled to run off the final seconds of the first half to go into the locker room leading 7–6.
Vanderbilt received the second half kickoff, but went three-and-out and punted. Every possession of the third quarter ended with a punt. Vanderbilt punted to Florida with 14:39 in the fourth quarter, and the Gators began their drive from their own 31-yard line. Florida would go 57 yards in seven plays, but committed their fourth turnover at the Vanderbilt 12-yard line when Jay Woods forced Demarcus Robinson to fumble. Vanderbilt's drive would take 5:29 off the clock before they punted from their own 33-yard line. Johnny Openshaw's punt would only go 12 yards before going out of bounds, and Florida took over from the Vanderbilt 45-yard line with 5:37 remaining. Florida drove to the 25-yard line in 3:10 before facing 4th-and-1. Austin Hardin would attempt 43-yard field goal, which went through the uprights to give the Gators their first lead since late in the first half. Vanderbilt returned the ensuing kickoff to their own 13-yard line, and soon faced 4th-and-10. Johnny McCrary's pass was incomplete, but Florida committed a holding foul, which gave Vanderbilt an automatic first down. On 2nd-and-10 from the 24-yard line, Johnny McCrary was sacked by Jordan Sherit, but Sherit was controversially flagged for targeting, which gave Vanderbilt another automatic first down and required that Sherit be ejected. Following a pair of incompletions, a sack, and a false start penalty, Vanderbilt faced 4th-and-25. Johnny McCrary made only his third completion of the game to Sam Dobbs for only 21 yards, allowing Florida to take over on downs to run off the final seconds of the game and escape with a 9–7 victory.

By virtue of Jordan Sherit's second half ejection for targeting, he would be ineligible for the first half of the next game at South Carolina
With the victory, Florida was able to secure a berth in the SEC Championship Game for the first time since 2009, and Jim McElwain became the first Florida coach to win the Eastern Division in his first year.

=== South Carolina ===
#11 Florida Gators (8–1) at South Carolina Gamecocks (3–6)

Quarter	1	2	3	4	Total
Florida	7	7	3	7	24
South Carolina	0	0	0	14	14

at Williams-Brice Stadium, Columbia, South Carolina

- Date: November 14, 2015
- Game time: 12:01 p.m. EST
- Game weather: Sunny • 53 °F (12 °C) • Wind Variable
- Game attendance: 78,536
- Referee: David Smith
- TV announcers (ESPN): Mike Patrick and Ed Cunningham
- Boxscore

Game information

First quarter

- FLA – Jordan Cronkrite 3-yard run (Austin Hardin kick), 1:50. Florida 7–0. Drive: 15 plays, 87 yards, 6:38.

Second quarter

- FLA – Jordan Cronkrite 41-yard pass from Treon Harris (Austin Hardin kick), 8:17. Florida 14–0. Drive: 12 plays, 76 yards, 7:11.

Third quarter

- FLA – Austin Hardin 39-yard field goal, 4:50. Florida 17–0. Drive: 12 plays, 70 yards, 6:20.

Fourth quarter

- SCAR – Perry Orth 17-yard pass from Pharoh Cooper (Elliott Fry kick), 8:59. Florida 17–7. Drive: 8 plays, 64 yards, 3:17.
- SCAR – Pharoh Cooper 38-yard pass from Perry Orth (Elliott Fry kick), 4:49. Florida 17–14. Drive: 5 plays, 79 yards, 1:58.
- FLA – Kelvin Taylor 1-yard run (Austin Hardin kick), 2:01. Florida 24–14. Drive: 6 plays, 75 yards, 2:48.

Top passers

- FLA – Treon Harris – 19/33, 256 yards, TD, 2 INT
- SCAR – Perry Orth – 13/24, 163 yards, TD, 2 INT

Top rushers

- FLA – Kelvin Taylor – 20 rushes, 105 yards, TD
- SCAR – Pharoh Cooper – 3 rushes, 16 yards

Top receivers

- FLA – Antonio Callaway – 5 receptions, 60 yards
- SCAR – Jerell Adams – 4 receptions, 46 yards

Uniform Combination
Helmet	Jersey	Pants

Florida had dropped four out of the last five games against South Carolina, with their last victory in 2012. Last year's game went to overtime as both teams were playing their last SEC game of the season. At the time, Florida still had a slim chance at staying in the hunt for the SEC Eastern Division title. The Gamecocks took a 10–0 lead in the first quarter, but the Gators scored 10 points of their own in the second quarter, and went into halftime tied. The Gators then scored a touchdown in the third quarter, only to have the Gamecocks match that in the fourth quarter. The Gators settled for a field goal in overtime, but the Gamecocks were able to pull away as Dylan Thompson ran for the 4-yard touchdown, defeating the Gators 23–20.
Linebacker/defensive lineman Jordan Sherit will be ineligible for the first half by virtue of his second half ejection for targeting in the previous game against Vanderbilt.

Florida would receive the first half kickoff and punt from their own 39-yard line after five plays. South Carolina was able to drive 27 yards to the Florida 45-yard line before punting 32 yards to the Florida 13-yard line. The Gators put on a 15-play, 87-yard drive that culminated with a 3-yard touchdown run by Jordan Cronkrite. After a three-and-out forced another South Carolina punt, Florida took over at their own 24-yard line. The Gators would put on another grueling drive—12 plays for 76 yards—again ending with a Jordan Cronkrite score, this time through the air from Treon Harris for 41 yards. South Carolina would once again punt, forcing the Gators to take over from their own 15-yard line. This time, the Gators went three-and-out and punted. However, Teez Tabor would intercept a Perry Orth pass 2 plays later, setting up the Gators inside the red zone at the 18-yard line. The Gators would drive to the 5-yard line before T.J. Gurley intercepted Treon Harris pass in the end zone, returning it to the 3-yard line. South Carolina would pick up with 1:01 remaining in the second quarter, and the clock would expire after two plays.
South Carolina would go three-and-out after receiving the second half kickoff. After the punt, the Gators took over at their own 33-yard line. South Carolina would get the ball back three plays later following Treon Harris' second interception of the game, this time caught by Gerald Dixon. However, South Carolina could not capitalize, and went three-and-out again. Florida would go on its third double-digit play drive of the game, with Austin Hardin kicking a 39-yard field goal to cap off a 12-play, 70-yard drive. Florida would again gain possession following a South Carolina three-and-out, and would go on their fourth double-digit play drive of the game, but turned the ball over on downs at the Gamecocks' 36-yard line. The Gamecocks would finally be able to capitalize on a stalled Gator drive by 64 yards in 8 plays to score a touchdown with 8:59 remaining in the game. Florida's ensuing possession ended in a three-and-out, and South Carolina was able to continue their momentum, scoring their second straight touchdown with 4:49 remaining. Now holding a slim three-point lead, Florida took over at their own 25-yard line following a touchback. The Gators would need only six plays this time to score their third touchdown of the game from a 1-yard run by Kelvin Taylor, following up his 53-yard run on the previous play, and the Gators took a 10-point lead with 2:01 remaining. On the Gamecocks' ensuing drive, they would get to the Florida 48-yard line, but defensive back Quincy Wilson would intercept a Perry Orth pass, and the Gators were able run out almost all of the remaining time, but punted back to South Carolina, who took over with three seconds remaining, and ran one play before time expired.

With the win, the Gators snapped a two-year losing streak to the Gamecocks, and finished with a perfect record against SEC Eastern Division opponents. It was also the first Florida–South Carolina game with both teams having first-year coaches since 2005, when Urban Meyer and Steve Spurrier were coaching the Gators and Gamecocks, respectively.

=== Florida Atlantic ===
Florida Atlantic Owls at Florida Gators – Game summary

Quarter	1	2	3	4	OT	Total
Florida Atlantic	0	0	7	7	0	14
No. 8 Florida	0	0	14	0	6	20

at Ben Hill Griffin Stadium • Gainesville, Florida

- Date: November 21, 2015
- Game time: 12:02 p.m. EST
- Game weather: Temperature: 74 °F (23 °C) • Wind: ENE at 5 miles per hour (8.0 km/h) • Weather: Cloudy, 80% humidity
- Game attendance: 90,107
- Referee: John McDaid
- TV announcers (SEC Network): Tom Hart and Andre Ware
- Boxscore

Game information

Third Quarter

- Florida – Kelvin Taylor 1-yard run (Austin Hardin kick), 9:44
- Florida – Antonio Callaway 53-yard pass from Treon Harris (Austin Hardin kick), 5:34
- Florida Atlantic – Kalib Woods 10-yard pass from Jaquez Johnson (Greg Joseph kick), 2:06

Fourth Quarter

- Florida Atlantic – Ocie Rose 0-yard fumble recovery (Greg Joseph kick), 8:03

Overtime

- Florida – Jake McGee 13-yard pass from Treon Harris

Passing

- FAU – Jaquez Johnson – 17/33, 148 yards, 1 touchdown, 1 interception
- FLA – Treon Harris – 8/17, 122 yards, 2 touchdowns, 1 interception

Rushing

- FAU – Greg Howell – 12 carries, 60 yards
- FLA – Kelvin Taylor – 25 carries, 98 yards, 1 touchdown

Receiving

- FAU – Jenson Stoshak – 6 receptions, 53 yards
- FLA – Antonio Callaway – 2 receptions, 52 yards, 1 touchdown

Tackling

- FAU – Azeez Al-Shaair – 9 tackles
- FLA – Jarrad Davis – 10 tackles

Overall record	Previous meeting	Previous winner
2–0	September 3, 2011	Florida, 41–3

Uniform Combination
Helmet	Jersey	Pants

This was the third game between the Owls and the Gators. The Gators opened their 2011 season against the Owls, and took a commanding 24-point lead before yielding a field goal late in the second quarter, and went to halftime leading 24–3. The Gators continued their impressive performance in the second half, holding the Owls to no further points, eventually winning 41–3.

The first three drives for both teams ended in punts before Florida's Antonio Callaway was able to execute a 52-yard punt return to the Owls' 18-yard line in the second quarter. Florida would leave the end zone empty handed, however, as Austin Hardin hit the left upright on a 33-yard field goal attempt. On the ensuing Florida Atlantic possession, the Owls drove 51 yards in ten plays to reach the Gators' 29-yard line before junior kicker Greg Joseph went wide right on a 45-yard field goal attempt. The two teams would punt to end their remaining drives and the first half concluded as a scoreless tie. The first half saw both teams miss a field goal, exchange nine punts, and go a combined 1-for-13 on third down conversions, the Owls with the lone third down conversion through the first half. Additionally, Florida Atlantic's offense outperformed the Gators in total yardage by more than twice, garnering 150 yards of offense to Florida's 69. Offensive struggles persisted for both teams during the first portion of the second half as the teams' initial second half drives ended in punts. The second Florida Atlantic possession was halted by a forced fumble by Antonio Morrison which was recovered by defensive lineman Taven Bryan at midfield and returned to Florida's 2-yard line. Kelvin Taylor punched in the ball in two plays to break the tie with a 7–0 lead. After a Florida Atlantic punt, the Gators scored again with a 53-yard Treon Harris–Antonio Callaway connection with 5:34 to go in the third quarter. Florida Atlantic responded on the ensuing drive by scoring on 9 plays to relegate the Florida lead back to 7 points. Florida's next possession ended with a deep pass from Treon Harris being intercepted in the end zone by Florida Atlantic's Sharrod Neasman for a touchback, and the Owls took over on their own 20-yard line. The Gators would reclaim possession three plays later when Teez Tabor intercepted FAU quarterback Jaquez Johnson at the Owls' 21-yard line. The Gators would not score however, as Hardin again missed a field goal, this time from 34 yards out. With new life and still down by 7, the Owls picked up a first down but had to punt after 5 plays. The Gators picked up at their own 10-yard line. Jordan Scarlett was able to pick up 6 yards before Harris fumbled after being hit by Trey Hendrickson. Ocie Rose jumped onto the ball in the end zone and after the successful FAU try, the Owls had managed to tie the game at 14. With 8:03 remaining in the game, Florida took over, only to go three-and-out. Three plays into the ensuing Owls drive, however, Nick Washington forced a fumble that was recovered by Marcus Maye giving the Gators their third takeaway of the game. Florida's offense once again stalled, however, and all of the drives that followed in the fourth quarter ended in punts before the Owls ran out the clock deep in their own territory to send the game into overtime. Florida had the first possession of the overtime period and scored in three plays on a 13-yard touchdown pass from Treon Harris to Jake McGee, but led only by 6 after Austin Hardin's extra point attempt was blocked. Florida Atlantic would reach the 9-yard line before the Gators defense stuffed a quarterback run for a loss of three yards followed by forcing three consecutive incompletions to preserve a final 20–14 overtime lead.

The win gave Jim McElwain his tenth win with the Florida Gators, the most wins of any first year Florida coach.

=== Florida State ===
Florida State Seminoles at Florida Gators – Game summary

Quarter	1	2	3	4	Total
No. 14 Florida State	0	10	3	14	27
No. 10 Florida	0	0	0	2	2

at Ben Hill Griffin Stadium • Gainesville, Florida

- Date: November 28, 2015
- Game time: 7:37 p.m. EST
- Game weather: Temperature: 68 °F (20 °C) • Wind: ENE at 5 miles per hour (8.0 km/h) • Weather: 85% humidity
- Game attendance: 90,916
- Referee: Hubert Owens
- TV announcers (ESPN): Mike Patrick and Ed Cunningham
- Boxscore

Game information

Second Quarter

- Florida state – Roberto Aguayo 45-yard field goal, 12:11
- Florida state – Jeremy Kerr 1-yard pass from Sean Maguire (Roberto Aguayo kick), 7:47

Third Quarter

- Florida state – Roberto Aguayo 51-yard field goal, 5:21

Fourth Quarter

- Florida – Team safety, 8:58
- Florida state – Dalvin Cook 15-yard run (Roberto Aguayo kick), 6:17
- Florida state – Dalvin Cook 29-yard run (Roberto Aguayo kick), 0:20

Passing

- FSU – Sean Maguire – 14/28, 160 yards, 1 touchdown
- FLA –[Treon Harris – 19/38, 134 yards

Rushing

- FSU – Dalvin Cook – 26 carries, 183 yards, 2 touchdowns
- FLA – Kelvin Taylor – 24 carries, 136 yards

Receiving

- FSU – Kermit Whitfield – 2 receptions, 52 yards
- FLA – Jake McGee – 4 receptions, 34 yards

Tackling

- FSU – Derwin James, Reggie Northrup, Terrance Smith – 9 tackles
- FLA – Jarrad Davis and Keanu Neal – 9 tackles

Overall record	Previous meeting	Previous winner
34–23–2	November 29, 2014	Florida State, 24–19

Uniform Combination
Helmet	Jersey	Pants

Like the series against South Carolina, Florida has dropped four out of the last five games against rival Florida State, with their last victory in 2012. Last year saw a tight game against the no. 1 Seminoles, as the Gators opened with three consecutive field goals before yielding a touchdown in the first quarter. The second quarter saw the Seminoles score two additional touchdowns before the Gators answered with one of their own, and sent the top-ranked Seminoles into halftime with a mere five-point lead. The Gators pulled to within a safety of the Seminoles with a field goal in the third quarter, but could not manage to score in the rest of the game, as the Seminoles scored a field goal in the fourth quarter, earning the final score of 24–19.

=== Alabama ===
Florida Gators vs. Alabama Crimson Tide – Game summary

Quarter	1	2	3	4	Total
No. 18 Florida	0	7	0	8	15
No. 2 Alabama	2	10	10	7	29

at Georgia Dome • Atlanta, Georgia

- Date: December 5, 2015
- Game time: 4:10 p.m. EST
- Game weather: Indoors
- Game attendance: 75,320
- Referee: Matt Austin
- TV announcers (CBS): Verne Lundquist and Gary Danielson
- Boxscore

Game information

First Quarter

- Alabama – Team safety, 9:05

Second Quarter

- Florida – Antonio Callaway 85-yard punt return (Neil MacInnes kick), 11:53
- Alabama – Adam Griffith 28-yard field goal, 5:45
- Alabama – Derrick Henry 2-yard run (Adam Griffith kick), 2:26

Third Quarter

- Alabama – Adam Griffith 30-yard field goal, 8:04
- Alabama – ArDarius Stewart 32-yard pass from Jake Coker (Adam Griffith kick), 2:49

Fourth Quarter

- Alabama – Richard Mullaney 9-yard pass from Jake Coker (Adam Griffith kick), 8:50
- Florida – C. J. Worton 46-yard pass from Treon Harris (Treon Harris run), 5:02

Passing

- FLA – Treon Harris – 9/24, 165 yards, 1 touchdown, 1 interception
- ALA – Jake Coker – 18/26, 204 yards, 2 touchdowns

Rushing

- FLA – Jordan Cronkrite – 2 carries, 8 yards; Kelvin Taylor – 7 carries, 8 yards
- ALA – Derrick Henry – 44 carries, 189 yards, 1 touchdown

Receiving

- FLA – Antonio Callaway – 1 reception, 46 yards; C. J. Worton – 1 reception, 46 yards, 1 touchdown
- ALA – Calvin Ridley – 8 receptions, 102 yards

Tackling

- FLA – Antonio Morrison – 11 tackles
- ALA – Ryan Anderson – 4 tackles

Overall record	Previous meeting	Previous winner
14–24	September 20, 2014	Alabama, 42–21

Uniform Combination
Helmet	Jersey	Pants

Since defeating Alabama in the 2008 SEC Championship Game, Florida has lost the last four games against Alabama. Florida trails 14–29 in the all-time series, with a 4–6 record when playing the Crimson Tide in the SEC Championship Game.

=== Michigan ===
Michigan Wolverines vs. Florida Gators – Game summary

Quarter	1	2	3	4	Total
No. 17 Michigan	7	10	14	10	41
No. 19 Florida	7	0	0	0	7

at Orlando Citrus Bowl • Orlando, Florida

- Date: January 1, 2016
- Game time: 1:00 p.m. EST
- Game weather: Temperature: 83 °F (28 °C) • Wind: W at 5 miles per hour (8.0 km/h) • Weather: Partly Cloudy
- Game attendance: 63,113
- Referee: Duane Heydt
- TV announcers (ABC): Mike Patrick and Ed Cunningham
- Boxscore

Game information

First Quarter

- Michigan – Drake Johnson 4-yd run (Kenny Allen kick), 4:29
- Florida – Treon Harris 2-yd pass from Antonio Callaway (Neil MacInnes kick), 3:56

Second Quarter

- Michigan – Jehu Chesson 31-yd pass from Jake Rudock (Kenny Allen kick), 3:49
- Michigan – Kenny Allen 21-yd field goal, 5:00

Third Quarter

- Michigan – Grant Perry 3-yd pass from Jake Rudock (Kenny Allen kick), 6:13
- Michigan – Sione Houma 2-yd run (Kenny Allen kick), 2:33

Fourth Quarter

- Michigan – Drake Johnson 8-yd pass from Jake Rudock (Kenny Allen kick), 5:14
- Michigan – Kenny Allen 25-yd field goal, 4:14

Passing

- MI – Jake Rudock – 20/31, 278 yards, 3 touchdowns
- FLA – Treon Harris – 8/21, 146 yards, 1 interception

Rushing

- MI – De'Veon Smith – 25 carries, 111 yards; Drake Johnson – 6 carries, 58 yards, 1 touchdown
- FLA – Treon Harris – 11 carries, 79 yards; Kelvin Taylor – 11 carries, 53 yards

Receiving

- MI – Jehu Chesson – 5 receptions, 118 yards, 1 touchdown; Grant Perry – 5 receptions, 51 yards, 1 touchdown
- FLA – Antonio Callaway – 5 receptions, 75 yards

Tackling

- MI – Joe Bolden – 7 tackles
- FL – Keanu Neal – 11 tackles

Overall record	Previous meeting	Previous winner
0–2	January 1, 2008	Michigan, 41–35

Uniform Combination
Helmet	Jersey	Pants

== Roster ==
2015 Florida Gators roster
Quarterbacks: 3 Treon Harris – sophomore; 7 Will Grier – (redshirt) freshman (suspended); 12 Josh Grady – (redshirt) senior; 13 Brian Fallace – (redshirt) freshman; 14 Luke Del Rio – (redshirt) sophomore; 15 Jacob Guy – (redshirt) junior; 17 Anderson Proctor – (redshirt) sophomore; 22 Harry Gornto V – freshman; Running backs: 21 Kelvin Taylor – junior; 22 Case Harrison – (redshirt) sophomore; 25 Jordan Scarlett – freshman; 32 Jordan Cronkrite – freshman; 33 Tyriek Hopkins – freshman; 37 Mark Herndon – (redshirt) junior; Wide receivers: 4 Brandon Powell – sophomore; 5 Ahmad Fulwood – junior; 9 Latroy Pittman Jr. – senior; 10 Valdez Showers – (redshirt) senior; 11 Demarcus Robinson – junior; 18 C.J. Worton – sophomore; 29 Evan Schroeder – (redshirt) senior; 36 Roger Dixon – senior; 43 Glenn Jarriel – freshman; 81 Antonio Callaway – freshman; 85 Chris Thompson – junior; 86 Raphael Andrades – (redshirt) junior; 87 Kalif Jackson – freshman; 88 Ryan Sousa – (redshirt) freshman; 89 Alvin Bailey – (redshirt) sophomore; Tight ends: 30 DeAndre Goolsby – sophomore; 38 Bair Diamond – senior; 39 Ryan Ferguson – (redshirt) freshman; 80 C'yontai Lewis – (redshirt) freshman; 82 Moral Stephens – (redshirt) freshman; 83 Jake McGee – (redshirt) senior; 84 Camrin Knight – freshman; Punters: 19 Johnny Townsend – (redshirt) sophomore; 95 Jack Spicer – freshman; 97 Jon Gould – freshman	Offensive line: 51 Antonio Riles – (redshirt) sophomore; 52 Travaris Dorsey – (redshirt) freshman; 53 Kavaris Harkless – (redshirt) freshman; 54 Cameron Dillard – (redshirt) sophomore; 59 T.J. McCoy – freshman; 60 Zach Shinn – (redshirt) freshman; 63 Trip Thurman – (redshirt) senior; 64 Tyler Jordan – freshman; 66 Nick Buchanan – freshman; 67 Brandon Sandifer – freshman; 68 Richerd Desir-Jones – freshman; 69 Marcus Givens – freshman; 71 Nick Villano – freshman; 73 Martez Ivey – freshman; 74 Fred Johnson – freshman; 75 Mason Halter – (redshirt) senior; 76 Marcel Benalcazar – junior; 77 Andrew Mike – (redshirt) freshman; 78 David Sharpe – sophomore; 79 Donovan Wlech – freshman; Defensive line: 54 Khairi Clark – (redshirt) freshman; 55 Thomas Holley – (redshirt) freshman; 57 Caleb Brantley – (redshirt) sophomore; 58 Josh Inman – freshman; 59 Dakota Wilson – (redshirt) senior; 62 Andrew Ivie – freshman; 70 Forrest Palmore – (redshirt) freshman; 90 Jonathan Bullard – senior; 91 Joey Ivie – junior; 92 Jabari Zuniga – freshman; 93 Taven Bryan – (redshirt) freshman; 94 Bryan Cox Jr. – (redshirt) junior; 95 Keivonnis Davis – freshman; 96 CeCe Jefferson – freshman; 98 Luke Ancrum – freshman; Long snappers: 41 Ryan Farr – freshman; 47 Jonathan Haney – (redshirt) junior; 49 Devin Grimm – (redshirt) freshman; 49 Jacob Tilghman – freshman	Rush: 14 Alex McCalister – (redshirt) junior; 17 Jordan Sherit – (redshirt) sophomore; 97 Justus Reed – (redshirt) freshman; Linebackers: 3 Antonio Morrison – senior; 13 Daniel McMillian – junior; 23 Jeremi Powell – (redshirt) junior; 25 Matt Rolin – (redshirt) sophomore; 27 Isaac Brinson – freshman; 34 Alex Anzalone – junior; 40 Jarrad Davis – junior; 44 Rayshad Jackson – freshman; 45 R.J. Raymond – (redshirt) freshman; 46 LeAndre Rembert – senior; 48 Anthony Harrell – (redshirt) senior; 50 Darius Singletary – freshman; 52 Steven Stipe – (redshirt) sophomore; 56 Cristian Garcia – (redshirt) Sophomore; 58 Jahim Lawrence – freshman; Defensive backs: 1 Vernon Hargreaves III – junior; 6 Quincy Wilson – sophomore; 7 Duke Dawson – sophomore; 8 Nick Washington – (redshirt) sophomore; 15 Deiondre Porter – (redshirt) freshman; 20 Marcus Maye – (redshirt) junior; 24 Brian Poole – senior; 26 Marcell Harris – (redshirt) sophomore; 28 Kylan Johnson – freshman; 30 Garrett Stephens – (redshirt) sophomore; 31 Teez Tabor – sophomore; 32 D.J. Powell – (redshirt) sophomore; 35 Chris Williamson – freshman; 36 Eddie Giles – (redshirt) freshman; 37 Isaac O'Neal – freshman; 38 Kerollin Francois – (redshirt) Sophomore; 39 Michael Iorio – (redshirt) junior; 42 Keanu Neal – junior; 43 Mark Norvelis – (redshirt) junior; Placekickers: 16 Austin Hardin – (redshirt) junior; 34 Neil MacInnes – junior; 98 Jorge Powell – (redshirt) freshman; 99 Dallas Stubbs – senior

== Coaching staff ==
Name	Position	Joined staff
Jim McElwain	Head coach	2015
Doug Nussmeier	Offensive coordinator / quarterbacks	2015
Geoff Collins	Defensive coordinator	2015
Greg Nord	Tight Ends / Special Teams	2015
Tim Skipper	Running Backs	2015
Kerry Dixon II	Wide receivers	2015
Mike Summers	offensive line	2014
Randy Shannon	Associate Head Coach / Linebackers	2015
Chris Rumph	Defensive line	2015
Kirk Callahan	Defensive Backs	2015
Mike Kent	Director of strength & conditioning	2015
John Van Dam	Offensive quality control assistant / assistant quarterbacks coach	2015

== Players drafted into the NFL ==
Round	Pick	Player	Position	NFL club
1	11	Vernon Hargreaves	CB	Tampa Bay Buccaneers
1	17	Keanu Neal	S	Atlanta Falcons
3	72	Jonathan Bullard	DT	Chicago Bears
4	125	Antonio Morrison	LB	Indianapolis Colts
4	126	Demarcus Robinson	WR	Kansas City Chiefs
6	211	Kelvin Taylor	RB	San Francisco 49ers
7	240	Alex McCalister	DE	Philadelphia Eagles
