= 2015 Birmingham Bowl (January) =

- 9th Birmingham Bowl
East Carolina Pirates	Florida Gators
(8–4)	(6–5)
The American	SEC
20	28
Head coach: Ruffin McNeill	Head coach: D. J. Durkin (interim)
	1	2	3	4	Total
East Carolina	7	0	10	3	20
Florida	7	14	7	0	28
- Date: January 3, 2015
- Season: 2014
- Stadium: Legion Field
- Location: Birmingham, Alabama
- MVP: Florida RB Adam Lane
- Favorite: Florida by 7
- Referee: Dan Romeo (Mtn. West)
- Attendance: 30,083
- Payout: US$1,100,000 (Florida); 900,000 (East Carolina)

United States TV coverage
- Network: ESPN/ESPN Radio
- Announcers: Dave Neal, Andre Ware, & Laura Rutledge (ESPN); Clay Matvick, Greg McElroy, & Cara Capuano (ESPN Radio)

The 2015 Birmingham Bowl was a college football bowl game played on January 3, 2015 at Legion Field in Birmingham, Alabama in the United States. The ninth annual Birmingham Bowl saw the Florida Gators of the Southeastern Conference defeat the East Carolina Pirates of the American Athletic Conference by a score of 28–20. The game started at 11:00 a.m. CST and aired on ESPN. It was one of the 2014–15 bowl games that concluded the 2014 FBS football season.

== Teams ==
This was the second overall meeting between these two teams. The last time these two teams met was in 1983, a game Florida won by a score of 24–17. The teams would meet again on September 12, 2015 at Florida's Ben Hill Griffin Stadium, a game Florida won 31-24.

=== East Carolina Pirates ===
After finishing their regular season with an 8–4 record, the Pirates accepted their invitation to play in the game.

This was East Carolina's second Birmingham Bowl. They previously played in the 2006 PapaJohns.com Bowl (the inaugural version of that game), losing to the South Florida Bulls by a score of 24–7.

=== Florida Gators ===
After finishing their regular season with a 6–5 record, the Gators accepted their invitation to play in the game.

Florida was led by interim head coach D. J. Durkin. Durkin was the Gators defensive coordinator until former head coach Will Muschamp was released at the conclusion of the 2014 regular season. Muschamp's replacement is former Colorado State head coach Jim McElwain.

This was Florida's first Birmingham Bowl.

== Game summary ==
=== Scoring summary ===
Scoring summary

Quarter	Time	Drive			Team	Scoring information	Score	
Quarter	Time	Plays	Yards	TOP	Team	Scoring information	ECU	UF
1	7:06	12	78	3:50	ECU	Justin Hardy 3-yard touchdown reception from Shane Carden, Warren Harvey kick good	7	0
1	3:09	–	–	–	UF	Interception returned 29 yards for touchdown by Brian Poole, Austin Hardin kick good	7	7
2	14:56	4	68	0:54	UF	Adam Lane 2-yard touchdown run, Austin Hardin kick good	7	14
2	6:23	13	80	6:23	UF	Brandon Powell 13-yard touchdown reception from Treon Harris, Austin Hardin kick good	7	21
3	12:51	4	70	0:42	ECU	Cam Worthy 4-yard touchdown reception from Shane Carden, Warren Harvey kick good	14	21
3	11:20	3	91	1:31	UF	Ahmad Fulwood 86-yard touchdown reception from Treon Harris, Austin Hardin kick good	14	28
3	6:10	7	44	1:26	ECU	24-yard field goal by Warren Harvey	17	28
4	11:55	10	54	2:59	ECU	24-yard field goal by Warren Harvey	20	28
"TOP" = time of possession. For other American football terms, see Glossary of American football.							20	28

=== Statistics ===
Statistics	ECU	UF
First downs	32	14
Plays–yards	536	345
Rushes–yards	33–109	42–174
Passing yards	427	171
Passing: Comp–Att–Int	34–68–2	13–28–1
Time of possession	32:23	27:37
