= 2015 SEC Championship Game =

- Conference Championship
- 2015 SEC Championship logo.
Florida Gators	Alabama Crimson Tide
(10–2)	(11–1)
15	29
Head coach: Jim McElwain	Head coach: Nick Saban
AP / Coaches / CFP; 18 / 15 / 18	AP / Coaches / CFP; 2 / 2 / 2
	1	2	3	4	Total
Florida	0	7	0	8	15
Alabama	2	10	10	7	29
- Date: December 5, 2015
- Season: 2015
- Stadium: Georgia Dome
- Location: Atlanta, Georgia
- MVP: Derrick Henry
- Favorite: Alabama by 17
- Referee: Matt Austin
- Attendance: 75,320

United States TV coverage
- Network: CBS
- Announcers: Verne Lundquist (play-by-play); Gary Danielson (color); Allie LaForce (sidelines)

2015 Southeastern Conference football standings
	Conf.			Overall
Team	W		L	W		L
Eastern Division
No. 25 Florida x	7	–	1	10	–	4
No. 22 Tennessee	5	–	3	9	–	4
Georgia	5	–	3	10	–	3
Vanderbilt	2	–	6	4	–	8
Kentucky	2	–	6	5	–	7
Missouri*	1	–	7	5	–	7
South Carolina	1	–	7	3	–	9
Western Division
No. 1 Alabama x$#^	7	–	1	14	–	1
No. 10 Ole Miss	6	–	2	10	–	3
Arkansas	5	–	3	8	–	5
No. 16 LSU *	5	–	3	9	–	3
Texas A&M	4	–	4	8	–	5
Mississippi State	4	–	4	9	–	4
Auburn	2	–	6	7	–	6
Championship: Alabama 29, Florida 15
# – College Football Playoff champion; ^ – College Football Playoff participant; $ – Conference champion; x – Division champion/co-champions; * LSU and Missouri vacated all wins due to NCAA violations.; Rankings from AP Poll

The 2015 SEC Championship Game was played on Saturday, December 5, 2015 in the Georgia Dome in Atlanta, and determined the 2015 football champion of the Southeastern Conference (SEC). The game was played between the East Division champion Florida Gators and West Division champion Alabama Crimson Tide. Alabama was the designated home team. CBS televised the game for the fifteenth consecutive year.

== Notes ==
The winner of the SEC Championship Game had gone on to compete for a national championship each of the last nine years. The SEC went 7–2 in the final eight BCS Championship games (in 2011 Alabama defeated LSU in a controversial pairing that ultimately helped bring about the playoff system instantiated for the 2014 season).

This is the eighth time Florida and Alabama have faced each other in the championship game, but the first since 2009, which was the last time Florida competed in the SEC Championship Game.

== Teams ==
=== Florida ===
The Gators got off to an unexpected 6–0 start after entering their first four games unranked in the AP Poll. Their fourth victory was a thrilling 28–27 come-from-behind victory over Tennessee as Will Grier completed a pass on 4th-and-13 to Antonio Callaway for a 63-yard touchdown, and Tennessee could not respond as they missed a 55-yard field goal attempt as time expired. The Gators' next victory came over the no. 3 Ole Miss Rebels 38–10. Florida would travel to Baton Rouge to face the LSU Tigers without Will Grier, who had been suspended for the remainder of the season that week due to testing positive for performance-enhancing drugs. Treon Harris started in his place, and the Gators narrowly lost, 35–28. The Gators rebounded after a bye week with a 27–3 victory over rival Georgia. The following game against Vanderbilt saw low offensive production, as the Gators won 9–7, clinching the Eastern Division title. The offense would struggle for the rest of the season, needing overtime to overcome the Florida Atlantic Owls and not scoring at all against rival Florida State in a 27–2 loss.

=== Alabama ===
The Crimson Tide would get off to a 2–0 start before losing to no. 15 Ole Miss for the second straight year 43–37. Alabama never faltered the rest of the season, winning eight of their last nine games by double digits, including over no. 2 and undefeated LSU, a game where Derrick Henry ran for 210 yards, while the defense held Heisman candidate Leonard Fournette to only 31. The Tide were able to clinch the Western Division title with their 29–13 victory over rival Auburn.

== Game summary ==
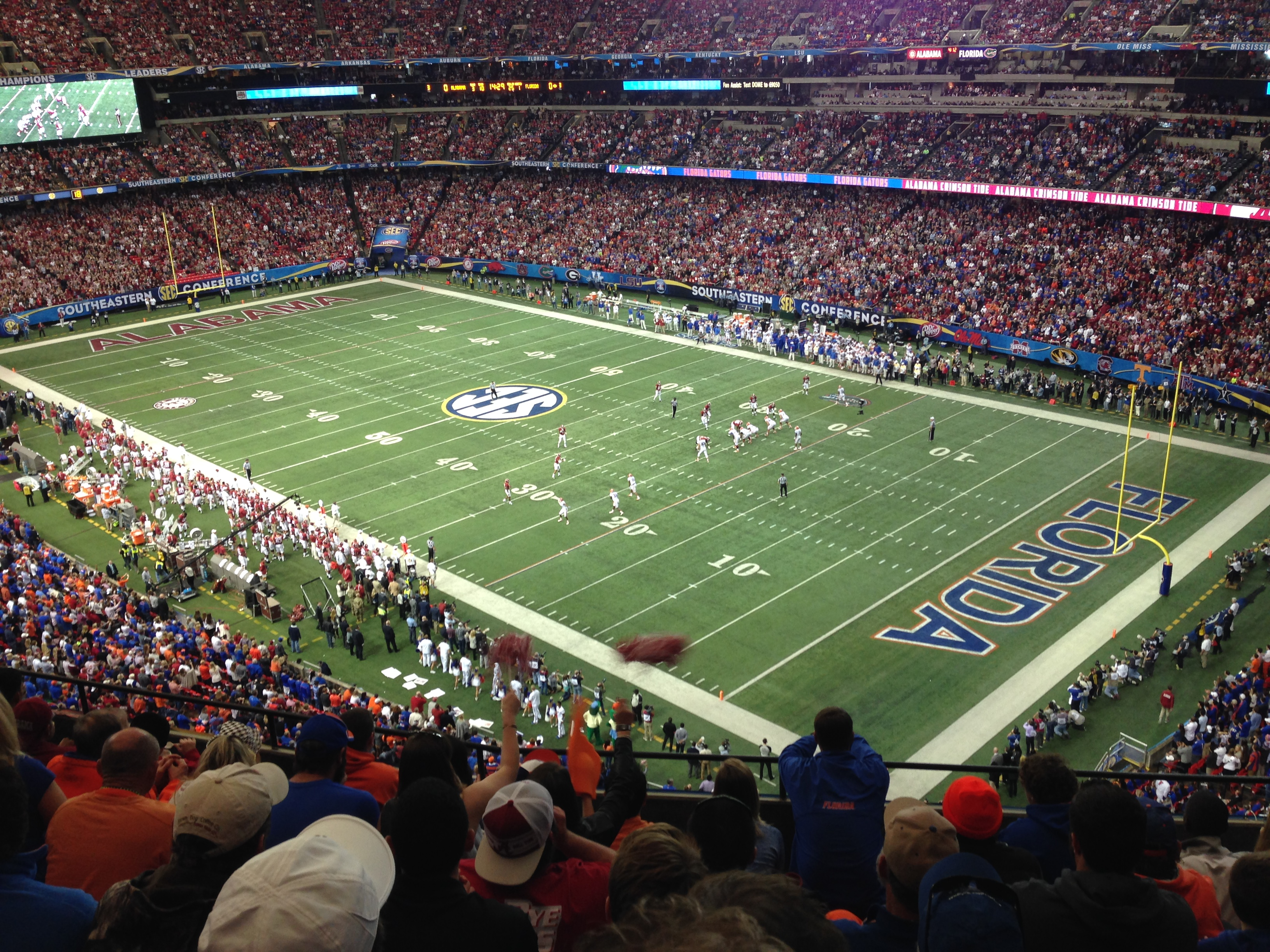

Scoring summary

Quarter	Time	Drive			Team	Scoring information	Score	
Quarter	Time	Plays	Yards	TOP	Team	Scoring information	Florida	Alabama
1	9:05	–	–	–	Alabama	Team safety	0	2
2	11:53	–	–	–	Florida	Antonio Callaway 85-yard punt return, Neil MacInnes kick good	7	2
2	5:45	14	64	6:08	Alabama	28-yard field goal by Adam Griffith	7	5
2	2:26	3	58	1:02	Alabama	Derrick Henry 2-yard touchdown run, Adam Griffith kick good	7	12
3	8:04	12	65	6:49	Alabama	30-yard field goal by Adam Griffith	7	15
3	2:49	10	81	4:47	Alabama	ArDarius Stewart 32-yard touchdown reception from Jake Coker, Adam Griffith kick good	7	22
4	8:50	9	57	4:26	Alabama	Richard Mullaney 9-yard touchdown reception from Jake Coker, Adam Griffith kick good	7	29
4	5:02	3	81	0:59	Florida	C. J. Worton 46-yard touchdown reception from Treon Harris, 2-point run good	15	29
"TOP" = time of possession. For other American football terms, see Glossary of American football.							15	29

=== Statistics ===
Statistics	Florida	Alabama
First downs	7	25
Total offense	180	437
Rushing yards–TD	15–0	233–1
Passing yards–TD	165–1	204–2
Passing: Comp–Att–Int	9–24–1	18–26–0
Fumbles: Number–Lost	1–0	2–1
Penalties: Number–Yards	5–51	5–35
Punts: Average Yardage	46.0	51.2
Kickoffs: Average Yardage	53.2	65.0
Sacks: Number–Yards	2–17	5–36
Field Goals: Good–Att	0–1	2–3
Points off turnovers	0	0
Time of Possession	16:31	43:29
