= 2016 Citrus Bowl =

2016 Citrus Bowl may refer to:

- 2016 Citrus Bowl (January), an American football game between the Michigan Wolverines and the Florida Gators, played as part of the 2015 season
- 2016 Citrus Bowl (December), an American football game between the LSU Tigers and the Louisville Cardinals, played as part of the 2016 season

== See also ==
- Citrus Bowl
