= Martez Ivey =

American gridiron football player (born 1995)

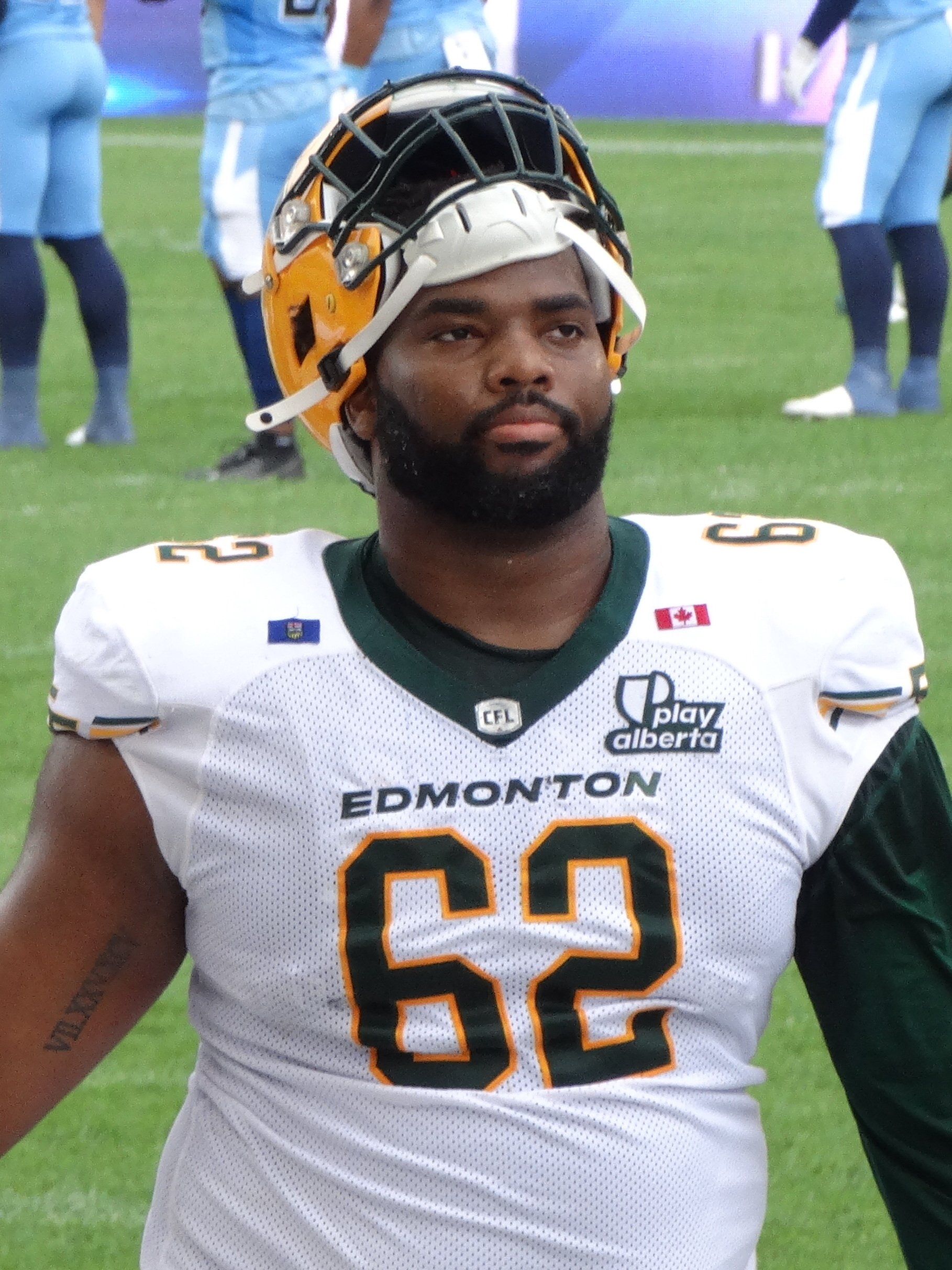
- Ivey with the Edmonton Elks in 2025

Profile
- Position: Offensive lineman

Personal information
- Born: July 25, 1995 (age 31); Apopka, Florida, U.S.
- Listed height: 6 ft 5 in (1.96 m)
- Listed weight: 305 lb (138 kg)

Career information
- High school: Apopka (FL)
- College: Florida
- NFL draft: 2019: undrafted

Career history
- New England Patriots (2019)*; Tampa Bay Vipers (2020); Carolina Panthers (2021)*; Toronto Argonauts (2021–2022); Edmonton Elks (2022–2025); Ottawa Redblacks (2026); BC Lions (2026)*
- * Offseason or practice squad member only

Awards and highlights
- CFL West All-Star (2024); 2× Second-team All-SEC (2017, 2018); Freshman All-SEC (2015); Mid Season All-XFL (2020)
- Stats at Pro Football Reference
- Stats at CFL.ca

Martez Ivey (born July 25, 1995) is an American professional football offensive tackle. He played college football at Florida. Ivey has also been a member of the New England Patriots, Tampa Bay Vipers, Carolina Panthers, and Toronto Argonauts.

== Early life ==
Ivey attended Apopka High School in Apopka, Florida. In his sophomore year, Ivey helped protect quarterback Zack Darlington as Apopka went on a 13–2 record, and won the 2012 FHSAA Class 8A state title over Cypress Bay. The following year, Apopka reached the state 8A final again, but lost to South Dade. After Darlington graduated, the offensive load was carried by halfback Chandler Cox. With Ivey paving the way, Apopka went 12–4 and beat Miami Columbus for the 2014 Class 8A state title. Ivey was recognized with the Hall Trophy as the U. S. Army Player of the Year.

Regarded as a five-star recruit by Rivals.com, Ivey was ranked as the No. 1 offensive tackle prospect in his class. With offers from virtually every major football program, Ivey said he was “50/50” between Florida and Auburn after his final visit. On National Signing Day 2015, he announced his commitment to the University of Florida.

== College career ==
In August 2015, Ivey suffered a slightly torn meniscus in his left knee during practice, and was scheduled for arthroscopic surgery on August 28. He was sidelined for a little more than two weeks, before making his college debut against Kentucky on September 19. Ivey played in the final twelve games of the season, starting in the last eight including the Citrus Bowl against Michigan. After the season, Ivey was named to the SEC All-Freshman team by the conference's coaches.

== Professional career ==
Pre-draft measurables
Height	Weight	Arm length	Hand span	Wingspan	40-yard dash	10-yard split	20-yard split	20-yard shuttle	Three-cone drill	Vertical jump	Broad jump	Bench press
6 ft 5 in (1.96 m)	315 lb (143 kg)	36 1/4 in (0.92 m)	10 3/8 in (0.26 m)	7 ft 2 1/4 in (2.19 m)	5.82 s	2.01 s	3.38 s	4.99 s	8.16 s	26.5 in (0.67 m)	8 ft 7 in (2.62 m)	15 reps
All values from NFL Combine/Pro Day

=== New England Patriots ===
On July 30, 2019, Ivey signed with the New England Patriots as an undrafted free agent. He was released by New England during final roster cuts on August 30.

=== Tampa Bay Vipers ===
Ivey was drafted in the 2nd round in phase two in the 2020 XFL draft by the Tampa Bay Vipers. He had his contract terminated when the league suspended operations on April 10, 2020.

=== Carolina Panthers ===
Ivey signed with the Carolina Panthers on April 6, 2021. He was waived by the Panthers on August 28.

=== Toronto Argonauts ===
On October 15, 2021, Ivey signed with the Toronto Argonauts. He appeared in one game for the Argonauts during the regular season.

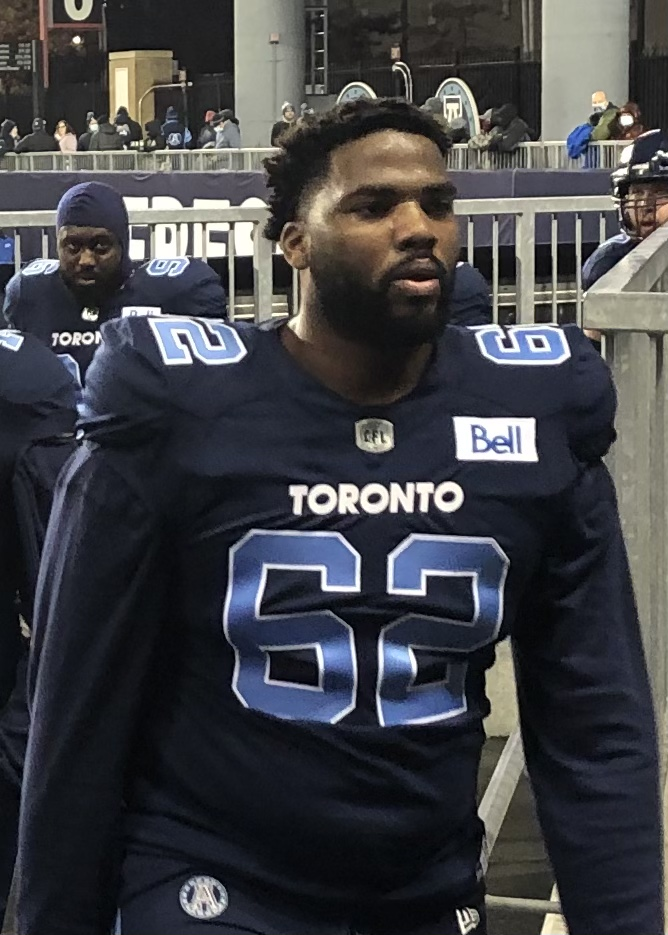
Ivey with the Toronto Argonauts in 2021

=== Edmonton Elks ===
The Edmonton Elks traded for Ivey just before the 2022 CFL season, acquiring him and defensive back Jalen Collins from the Toronto Argonauts for a 2023 6th Round Draft Pick. Ivey played in 15 games for the Elks in his first season with the club. After missing training camp and both preseason games, Ivey was added to the active roster on May 29, 2023, after he resolved an issue with his passport. In 2023, he played and started in 15 regular season games.

Ivey was again a regular starter in 2024 as he started in all 18 regular season games. He played in 18 games in 2025. After the Elks had made signings in free agency, Ivey was released on February 13, 2026.

=== Ottawa Redblacks ===
On February 17, 2026, it was announced that Ivey had signed with the Ottawa Redblacks. He was released by the Redblacks on June 24.

=== BC Lions ===
On August 4, 2026, Ivey signed with the BC Lions, and joined their practice roster. He was released on August 25, 2026.
