= Alex McCalister =

American football player (born 1993)

No. 57
- Position: Linebacker

Personal information
- Born: October 17, 1993 (age 33); Fort Stewart, Georgia, U.S.
- Listed height: 6 ft 6 in (1.98 m)
- Listed weight: 239 lb (108 kg)

Career information
- High school: West Forsyth (Clemmons, North Carolina)
- College: Florida
- NFL draft: 2016: 7th round, 240th overall pick

Career history
- Philadelphia Eagles (2016–2017); Washington Redskins (2017–2018)*; Winnipeg Blue Bombers (2019)*; Columbus Destroyers (2019); Winnipeg Blue Bombers (2019–2021); BC Lions (2023)*
- * Offseason or practice squad member only
- Stats at Pro Football Reference

Alex McCalister (born October 17, 1993) is an American former professional football linebacker. He played college football as a defensive end at the University of Florida from 2012 to 2015. He was selected in the seventh round of the 2016 NFL draft by the Philadelphia Eagles.

== College career ==
It was reported that McCalister was dismissed from the Florida Gators football team prior to the 2016 Citrus Bowl against Michigan; however, McCallister in reality never was dismissed and instead was merely injured. He declared for the 2016 NFL draft as an early entrant.

== Professional career ==
Pre-draft measurables
Height	Weight	Arm length	Hand span	40-yard dash	10-yard split	20-yard split	20-yard shuttle	Three-cone drill	Vertical jump	Broad jump
6 ft 6 1/8 in (1.98 m)	239 lb (108 kg)	36 in (0.91 m)	9 3/8 in (0.24 m)	4.80 s	1.68 s	2.78 s	4.00 s	7.01 s	34.5 in (0.88 m)	10 ft 8 in (3.25 m)
All values from NFL Combine

=== Philadelphia Eagles ===
McCalister was selected by the Philadelphia Eagles in the seventh round, 240th overall, of the 2016 NFL draft. On August 28, 2016, the Eagles placed McCalister on injured reserve with a calf strain.

On September 2, 2017, McCalister was waived by the Eagles. He was re-signed to the practice squad on October 10, 2017. He was released by the team on October 24, 2017.

=== Washington Redskins ===
McCalister was signed to the Washington Redskins' practice squad on December 12, 2017. He signed a reserve/future contract with the Redskins on January 1, 2018, but was waived on August 6.

=== Winnipeg Blue Bombers (first stint) ===
McCalister signed with the Winnipeg Blue Bombers of the Canadian Football League (CFL) on February 15, 2019, but was released during final roster cuts on June 9.

=== Columbus Destroyers ===
McCalister was assigned to the Columbus Destroyers of the Arena Football League on July 9, 2019.

=== Winnipeg Blue Bombers (second stint) ===
McCalister was signed to the Blue Bombers' active roster on August 20. He was released on June 1, 2021.

=== BC Lions ===
On December 15, 2022, McCalister signed with the BC Lions of the CFL. On May 31, 2023, McCalister was released by the Lions.
