= 2016 Citrus Bowl (January) =

American college football game

2016 Buffalo Wild Wings Citrus Bowl
- 70th Citrus Bowl
Michigan Wolverines	Florida Gators
(9–3)	(10–3)
Big Ten	SEC
41	7
Head coach: Jim Harbaugh	Head coach: Jim McElwain
AP / Coaches / CFP; 17 / 17 / 14	AP / Coaches / CFP; 18 / 19 / 19
	1	2	3	4	Total
Michigan	7	10	14	10	41
Florida	7	0	0	0	7
- Date: January 1, 2016
- Season: 2015
- Stadium: Camping World Stadium
- Location: Orlando, Florida
- MVP: Jake Rudock
- Favorite: Michigan by 4
- Referee: Duane Heydt (ACC)
- Attendance: 63,113

United States TV coverage
- Network: ABC/ESPN Radio
- Announcers: Mike Patrick, Ed Cunningham, & Dr. Jerry Punch (ESPN); Beth Mowins, Anthony Becht, & Paul Carcaterra (ESPN Radio)

The 2016 Citrus Bowl was an American college football bowl game played on January 1, 2016 at Camping World Stadium in Orlando, Florida. The 70th edition was one of the 2015–16 NCAA football bowl games that concluded the 2015 NCAA Division I FBS football season. The game was televised by ABC. It was sponsored by the Buffalo Wild Wings restaurant franchise and is officially known as the Buffalo Wild Wings Citrus Bowl.

== Teams ==
The game featured the Michigan Wolverines of the Big Ten Conference, and the Florida Gators of the Southeastern Conference in their third meeting against each other, with all three matchups coming in January bowl games in Florida.

=== Michigan Wolverines ===
After finishing their regular season with a 9–3 record, the Wolverines were selected to their fifth Citrus Bowl appearance. This was their 44th bowl game appearance, tied for 11th-highest total all-time among FBS schools. Michigan won the previous meeting against the Florida Gators in the 2008 Capital One Bowl, by a score of 41–35.

=== Florida Gators ===
After finishing their regular season with a 10–3 record, the Gators were selected to their sixth Citrus Bowl appearance, tying them with Georgia for the most Citrus Bowl appearances. This was their 42nd bowl game appearance.

== Game summary ==
=== Scoring Summary ===
Scoring summary

Quarter	Time	Drive			Team	Scoring information	Score	
Quarter	Time	Plays	Yards	TOP	Team	Scoring information	MICH	FLA
1	5:54	9	73	4:29	MICH	Drake Johnson 4-yard touchdown run, Kenny Allen kick good	7	0
1	1:58	8	75	3:56	FLA	Treon Harris 2-yard touchdown reception from Antonio Callaway, Neil MacInnes kick good	7	7
2	8:49	8	80	3:49	MICH	Jehu Chesson 31-yard touchdown reception from Jake Rudock, Kenny Allen kick good	14	7
2	1:01	12	77	5:00	MICH	21-yard field goal by Kenny Allen	17	7
3	8:47	12	69	6:13	MICH	Grant Perry 3-yard touchdown reception from Jake Rudock, Kenny Allen kick good	24	7
3	3:48	5	58	2:33	MICH	Sione Houma 2-yard touchdown run, Kenny Allen kick good	31	7
4	12:32	12	84	5:14	MICH	Drake Johnson 8-yard touchdown reception from Jake Rudock, Kenny Allen kick good	38	7
4	6:42	9	34	4:14	MICH	25-yard field goal by Kenny Allen	41	7
"TOP" = time of possession. For other American football terms, see Glossary of American football.							41	7

=== Statistics ===
Statistics	Michigan	Florida
First downs	28	14
Plays–yards	77–503	52–273
Rushes–yards	46–225	26–118
Passing yards	278	155
Passing: Comp–Att–Int	20–31–0	10–25–2
Time of Possession	38:38	21:22
