= Sione Houma =

American football player (born 1994)

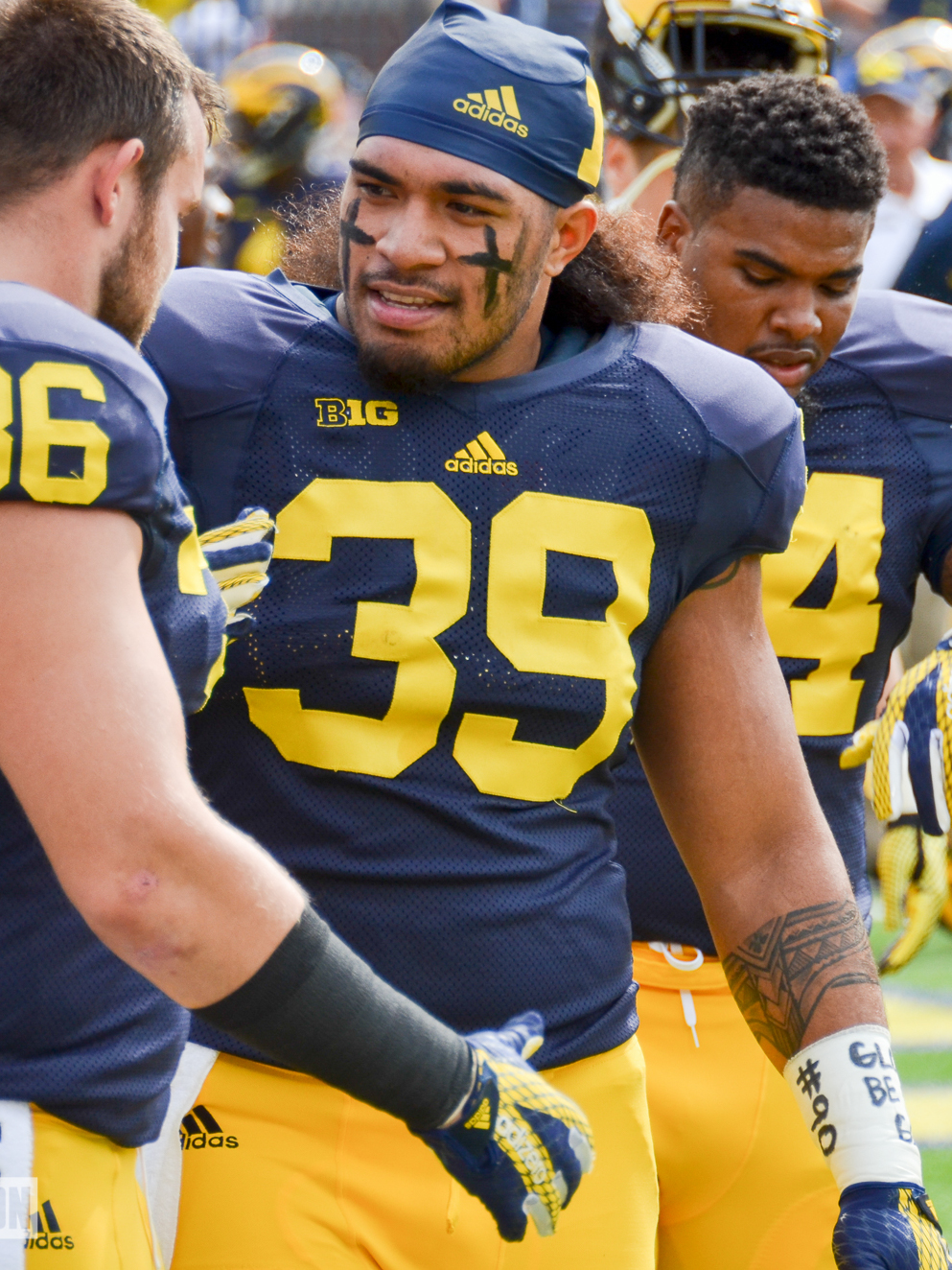

No. 39
- Position: Fullback

Personal information
- Born: June 21, 1994 (age 32); Salt Lake City, Utah
- Listed height: 6 ft 0 in (1.83 m)
- Listed weight: 243 lb (110 kg)

Career information
- High school: Highland (Salt Lake City, Utah)
- College: Michigan
- NFL draft: 2016: undrafted

Career history
- New Orleans Saints (2016)*
- * Offseason or practice squad member only
- Stats at Pro Football Reference

Sione Vea Houma (born June 21, 1994) is an American former football fullback.

Houma was born in Utah, the son of immigrants from Tonga. He grew up in Salt Lake City and played high school football at Highland, winning a state championship as a senior. While in high school, he ran the 40-yard dash in 4.53 seconds, rushed for 2,001 yards in his junior and senior years, and returned a kickoff 88 yards for a touchdown.

Houma enrolled at the University of Michigan in 2012 and played in every game for the Michigan football team from 2012 to 2014, but he had not carried the ball prior to his senior season, with his playing time limited to blocking and special teams. He initially gained note for introducing the haka to the Michigan football team, and for his ukulele playing.

As a senior in 2015, Houma gained acclaim for his tough running game, especially in short yardage situations. Coach Jim Harbaugh was so impressed with Houma that he gave him playing time at tailback. Harbaugh began referring to him as "Houuuuu-maaaa!" and noted the crowd response: "They're not booing, they're saying Houma." Michigan's leading rusher, De'Veon Smith, referred to Houma as a "coconut head." Houma rushed for 184 yards and five touchdowns during his senior year. In the 2016 Citrus Bowl, Houma carried the ball a career-high nine times for 32 yards and a touchdown.

Houma signed with the New Orleans Saints as an undrafted free agent on May 2, 2016 and was released during the preseason on August 30, 2016 as the Saints reduced the roster to 74 players.
