= Antonio Callaway =

American football player (born 1997)

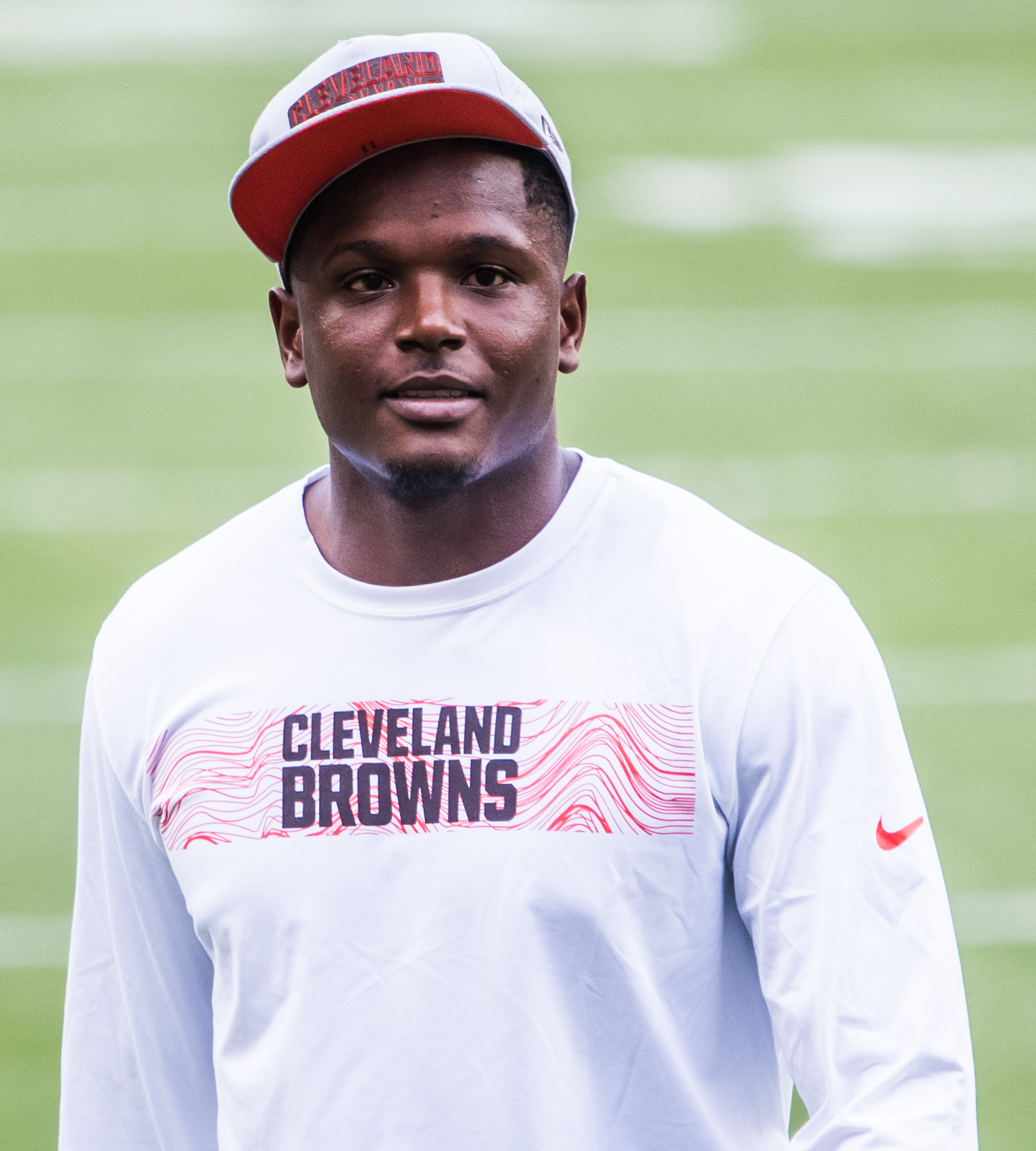
- Callaway with the Cleveland Browns in 2018

No. 11, 16
- Position: Wide receiver

Personal information
- Born: January 9, 1997 (age 29); Florida City, Florida, U.S.
- Listed height: 5 ft 11 in (1.80 m)
- Listed weight: 200 lb (91 kg)

Career information
- High school: Booker T. Washington (Miami, Florida)
- College: Florida (2015–2017)
- NFL draft: 2018: 4th round, 105th overall pick

Career history
- Cleveland Browns (2018–2019); Tampa Bay Vipers (2020); Miami Dolphins (2020); Kansas City Chiefs (2021)*; Dallas Cowboys (2022–2023)*
- * Offseason or practice squad member only

Awards and highlights
- First-team All-American (2015)

Career NFL statistics
- Receptions: 53
- Receiving yards: 695
- Receiving touchdowns: 5
- Return yards: 216
- Rushing yards: 7
- Stats at Pro Football Reference

Antonio Callaway (born January 9, 1997) is an American former professional football player who was a wide receiver in the National Football League (NFL). He played college football for the Florida Gators and was selected by the Cleveland Browns in the fourth round of the 2018 NFL draft.

== Early life ==
Callaway attended Booker T. Washington High School in Miami, Florida.

== College career ==
As a wide receiver at the University of Florida, he made an immediate impact in his true freshman season. He was selected All-American as a return specialist by CBS Sports in 2015. The 2015 Gators got off to an unexpected 6–0 start after entering their first four games unranked in the AP Poll. Their fourth victory was a thrilling 28–27 come-from-behind victory over Tennessee as Will Grier completed a pass on 4th-and-14 to Callaway for a 63-yard touchdown, and Tennessee could not respond as they missed a 55-yard field goal attempt as time expired. Callaway finished the 2015 season as Florida's leading receiver with 35 catches for 678 yards and four touchdowns.

In January 2016, Callaway and quarterback Treon Harris were suspended from the team. Florida head coach Jim McElwain said the suspensions were related to "schoolwork." It was later revealed that the suspensions were related to an accusation of sexual assault. A woman accused Callaway of sexual assault and Harris of attempted sexual assault in December 2015. The woman reported the alleged incident to Florida's student conduct and conflict resolution office, but did not report the incident to either Gainesville police or University of Florida police. The University of Florida suspended both players for violating the school's code of conduct policy. Both players remained suspended until June, when they returned to campus to take classes and work out at the school's facilities. Callaway was found not responsible of sexually assaulting the female student by an independent hearing officer in a Title IX hearing. The ruling was made by attorney Jake Schickel, a former track and field athlete at Florida who has donated money to Florida's football and basketball programs. Schickel cleared Callaway of three violations of Florida's student conduct code, which included endangering another's health or safety, sexual assault and sexual misconduct, and conduct causing physical injury. On December 7, 2017, while suspended, Callaway made the decision that he was going to enter the 2018 NFL draft.

=== Collegiate statistics ===
Season	GP	Receiving				Rushing			
Season	GP	Rec	Yds	Avg	TD	Att	Yds	Avg	TD
2015	14	35	678	19.4	4	3	19	6.3	0
2016	12	54	721	13.4	3	5	32	6.4	1
2017	0	Suspended							
Career	26	89	1,399	15.7	7	8	51	6.4	1

== Professional career ==
External videos
- Antonio Callaway's NFL Combine Workout
- Callaway runs a 4.41 in the 40-yard dash

Pre-draft measurables
Height	Weight	Arm length	Hand span	40-yard dash	10-yard split	20-yard split	20-yard shuttle	Three-cone drill	Vertical jump	Broad jump	Bench press
5 10 5/8	200 lb (91 kg)	31 1/2 in (0.80 m)	9 1/2 in (0.24 m)	4.41 s	1.52 s	2.57 s	4.33 s	7.00 s	34 in (0.86 m)	10 ft 1 in (3.07 m)	7 reps
All values from NFL Combine /Florida's Pro Day

=== Cleveland Browns ===
==== 2018 season ====
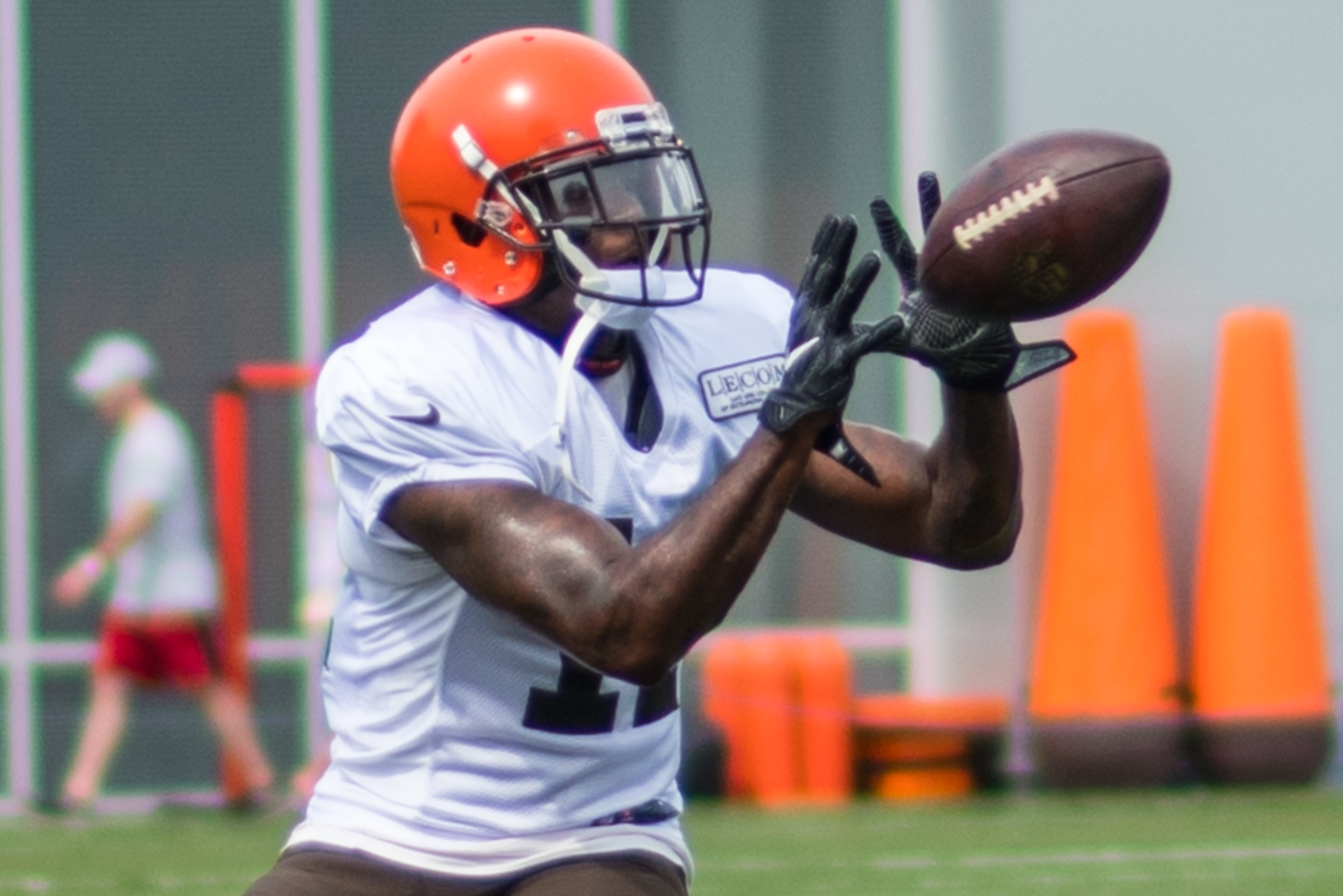
Callaway with the Browns in 2018

The Cleveland Browns selected Callaway in the fourth round (105th overall) of the 2018 NFL draft. The Cleveland Browns traded their fourth (114th overall) and sixth round picks (178th overall) to the New England Patriots and received the Patriots' fourth round pick (105th overall) in exchange in order to draft Callaway. Callaway was the 12th wide receiver drafted in 2018. On May 21, 2018, the Browns signed Callaway to a four-year, $3.17 million contract that includes a signing bonus of $717,853.

External videos
- Browns draft Antonio Callaway 105th overall
- Antonio Callaway Press Conference

Callaway began training camp competing against Jeff Janis, Ricardo Louis, and Rashard Higgins for the job as the fourth wide receiver on the Browns' depth chart. Callaway and Rashard Higgins became contenders for a starting wide receiver position after Corey Coleman was granted a trade request on August 5, 2018. Head coach Hue Jackson named Callaway the third wide receiver on the depth chart to start the regular season, behind Jarvis Landry and Josh Gordon.

He made his professional regular season debut in the Browns' season-opener against the Pittsburgh Steelers and returned a kick for an eight-yard gain during their 21–21 tie. On September 16, 2018, Callaway earned his first career start and replaced Josh Gordon due to a hamstring injury. He recorded three receptions for 81-yards and scored his first career touchdown during a 21–18 loss at the New Orleans Saints in Week 2. Callaway caught his first career touchdown reception on a 47-yard pass by Browns' quarterback Tyrod Taylor during the fourth quarter. The following day, head coach Hue Jackson named Callaway the starting wide receiver after the Browns traded Josh Gordon to the Patriots. In Week 8, Callaway made a season-high five receptions for 36-yards and caught a one-yard touchdown pass thrown by Baker Mayfield as the Browns lost 33–18 at the Steelers.

==== 2019 season ====
On August 9, 2019, Callaway was suspended for the first four games of the 2019 season for violating the NFL's substance abuse policy. He was reinstated from suspension on September 30, and was activated prior to Week 5. On November 14, the Browns waived Callaway after showing up late to meetings and practices. He was also facing a 10-game suspension at the time of his release. He lost his appeal on November 15, and was suspended for the final seven weeks of the 2019 regular season and the first three weeks of the 2020 regular season.

=== Tampa Bay Vipers ===
Callaway was signed by the Tampa Bay Vipers of the XFL on January 16, 2020. He suffered a lower leg injury in practice on January 29, and was placed on injured reserve on January 30. Callaway had his contract terminated when the league suspended operations on April 10.

=== Miami Dolphins ===
On September 7, 2020, Callaway was signed to the practice squad of the Miami Dolphins, while still serving a three-game suspension. He was suspended an additional four games by the NFL on September 18. He was reinstated from suspension on November 2, and the team activated him back to the practice squad. Callaway was elevated to the active roster on November 14 for the team's Week 10 game against the Los Angeles Chargers, and reverted to the practice squad after the game. Callaway was promoted to the active roster on November 18. The Dolphins waived Callaway on December 21.

=== Kansas City Chiefs ===
On January 13, 2021, Callaway signed a reserve/futures contract with the Kansas City Chiefs. He was waived with an injury designation on August 17. After going unclaimed on waivers, he was put on the Chiefs' injured reserve. He was released on August 26 after reaching an injury settlement with the Chiefs.

=== Dallas Cowboys ===
On November 11, 2022, the Dallas Cowboys hosted Callaway for a workout. He was signed to the team’s practice squad four days later. He signed a reserve/future contract with the Cowboys on January 25, 2023. Callaway was released by Dallas on June 5, following his arrest.

== NFL career statistics ==
Year	Team	Games		Receiving						Rushing					
Year	Team	GP	GS	Tgt	Rec	Yds	Y/R	Y/G	TD	Att	Yds	Y/A	Y/G	TD	Fum
2018	CLE	16	11	79	43	586	13.6	36.6	5	2	7	3.5	0.6	0	1
2019	CLE	4	2	15	8	89	11.1	22.3	0	0	0	0.0	0.0	0	0
2020	MIA	5	1	4	2	20	10.0	4.0	0	0	0	0.0	0.0	0	0
Career		25	14	98	53	695	13.1	27.8	5	2	7	3.5	0.6	0	1

== Legal issues ==
On August 5, 2018, Callaway was issued a citation in Strongsville, Ohio for possession of marijuana and driving with a suspended license during a traffic stop at 3am. The drug charges were dropped, and Callaway paid $911 for the license violation.

Callaway was arrested in Miami, Florida on June 4, 2023, for driving with a suspended license. His arrest led to his release from the Cowboys the next day.

== See also ==
- 2015 College Football All-America Team
