= Brandon Powell (American football) =

American football player (born 1995)

Profile
- Positions: Wide receiver, punt returner

Personal information
- Born: September 12, 1995 (age 31); Deerfield Beach, Florida, U.S.
- Listed height: 5 ft 8 in (1.73 m)
- Listed weight: 181 lb (82 kg)

Career information
- High school: Deerfield Beach
- College: Florida (2014–2017)
- NFL draft: 2018: undrafted

Career history
- Detroit Lions (2018); Atlanta Falcons (2019–2020); Buffalo Bills (2021)*; Miami Dolphins (2021)*; Los Angeles Rams (2021–2022); Minnesota Vikings (2023–2024)
- * Offseason or practice squad member only

Awards and highlights
- Super Bowl champion (LVI)

Career NFL statistics as of 2024
- Receptions: 83
- Receiving yards: 749
- Receiving touchdowns: 3
- Return yards: 2,122
- Return touchdowns: 1
- Stats at Pro Football Reference

Brandon Powell (born September 12, 1995) is an American professional football wide receiver and punt returner. He played college football for the Florida Gators. He has been a member of the Detroit Lions, Atlanta Falcons, Buffalo Bills, Miami Dolphins, Los Angeles Rams and Minnesota Vikings.

== College career ==
Powell entered the Florida football program out of Deerfield Beach High School as a four-star recruit and was ranked 267th overall in the ESPN 300 and was also the 34th ranked athlete in the 2014 recruiting class. Brandon began his collegiate career as a running back at Florida. He later switched to wide receiver his sophomore year. During his freshman season, he caught 15 passes for 147 yards with a touchdown. As a sophomore, Powell caught 29 passes for 390 yards and three touchdowns, including a career long 77 yard score against Ole Miss. As a junior, he had 45 receptions for 387 yards and 2 touchdowns. During his senior year, Powell had a team high 42 receptions for 406 yards and 3 touchdowns.

== Professional career ==
Pre-draft measurables
Height	Weight	Arm length	Hand span	40-yard dash	10-yard split	20-yard split	20-yard shuttle	Three-cone drill	Vertical jump	Broad jump
5 ft 8 in (1.73 m)	181 lb (82 kg)	29 1/4 in (0.74 m)	8 7/8 in (0.23 m)	4.59 s	1.60 s	2.70 s	4.15 s	6.88 s	32.0 in (0.81 m)	9 ft 7 in (2.92 m)
All values from Pro Day

=== Detroit Lions ===
Powell signed for the Detroit Lions as an undrafted free agent on May 11, 2018. On December 30, Powell started in place of Kenny Golladay and caught six passes for 103 yards against the Green Bay Packers.

On August 31, 2019, Powell was waived by the Lions.

=== Atlanta Falcons ===
On September 2, 2019, Powell was signed to the practice squad of the Atlanta Falcons. On November 5, 2019, Powell was promoted to the active roster.

=== Buffalo Bills ===
Powell signed with the Buffalo Bills on a one-year contract on March 26, 2021. He was released on August 30, 2021.

=== Miami Dolphins ===
On September 2, 2021, Powell was signed to the Miami Dolphins practice squad. He was released on October 12.

=== Los Angeles Rams ===
On November 4, 2021, Powell was signed to the Los Angeles Rams practice squad. On December 26, 2021, in a game against the Minnesota Vikings, Powell returned a punt 61 yards for a touchdown that was key in the Rams' victory, ensuring a playoff berth for the team. He was named National Football Conference Special Teams Player of the Week for the first time in his NFL career for his performance. Powell won Super Bowl LVI against the Cincinnati Bengals.

On March 19, 2022, Powell re-signed with the Rams on a one-year deal.

=== Minnesota Vikings ===
On March 22, 2023, Powell signed with the Vikings. He served as the team's primary punt returner in 2023 and also put up career receiving numbers with 29 catches for 324 yards and one touchdown.

On March 12, 2024, Powell signed a one-year contract extension with the Vikings.
