= Treon Harris =

American college football player

No. 3, 5
- Position: Wide receiver

Personal information
- Born: Miami, Florida, U.S.
- Listed height: 5 ft 11 in (1.80 m)
- Listed weight: 195 lb (88 kg)

Career information
- High school: Booker T. Washington (Miami)
- College: Florida (2014–2015); Tennessee State (2017–2018)
- Stats at ESPN

Treon Harris is an American former college football player. He began his college career with the Florida Gators as a quarterback, before transferring in 2017 to the Tennessee State Tigers, where he started out as a quarterback before finishing his college career as a wide receiver.

== Early life ==
Harris was a three-year starter at quarterback for Booker T. Washington High School in Miami, Florida, and led his high school football team to state championships in 2012 and 2013. Coming out of high school, Harris was recruited by former Gators' offensive coordinator, Kurt Roper. Harris originally committed to play for the Florida State Seminoles, but flipped to the Gators on national signing day.

== College career ==
=== Florida ===
Harris accepted an athletic scholarship to attend the University of Florida in Gainesville, Florida, and play for the Florida Gators football team, beginning in 2014. After previous Gators starting quarterback Jeff Driskel was injured during the Gators' game versus the Tennessee Volunteers, Harris replaced him and helped the Gators win 10–9.

After an embarrassing homecoming loss to Missouri, Florida coach Will Muschamp named Treon Harris the starter against No. 11 Georgia Bulldogs. Harris, a true freshman, led the Gators to an upset victory in his first start, beating the Bulldogs 38–20. He completed three of his six passes for 27 yards and rushed for six times that gained 31 yards.

In his second collegiate start, Harris faced the Vanderbilt Commodores. Harris completed 13 of his 21 passes for 215 yards. Treon Harris also did some damage on the ground. He rushed for ten times that gained 49 yards and scored two touchdowns, including a 33-yard touchdown that put the game away. Harris led the Gators to another victory, beating the Commodores 34–10 on the road. Harris's third collegiate start was against South Carolina Gamecocks. Harris completed 5 of 11 passes for 60 yards with one touchdown and zero interceptions. Harris also had big ground game with 20 rushes for 111 total yards and no touchdowns. Although a strong effort Harris suffered his first collegiate loss as a starter in a 23–20 overtime loss to the Gamecocks. During his 2014 freshman season, Harris compiled 1,019 passing yards with nine passing touchdowns and four interceptions. As a rusher, Harris had 332 yards and three touchdowns.

In 2015, Harris was the starting quarterback for the season opener, but lost his starting job to Will Grier after the opening game. After Grier tested positive for a banned substance and was suspended by the NCAA, Harris reclaimed the starting quarterback job and started the final eight games of the season. He finished the 2015 season with 1,676 passing yards, 9 touchdowns, and 6 interceptions.

In January 2016, Harris and wide receiver Antonio Callaway were suspended from the team. Florida head coach Jim McElwain said the suspensions were related to "schoolwork." It was later revealed that the suspensions were related to an accusation of sexual assault. A woman accused Callaway of sexual assault and Harris of attempted sexual assault in December 2015. The woman reported the alleged incident to Florida's student conduct and conflict resolution office, but did not report the incident to either Gainesville police or University of Florida police. The University of Florida suspended both players for violating the school's code of conduct policy. Both players remained suspended until June, when they returned to campus to take classes and work out at the school's facilities. On July 25, 2016, the school confirmed that Harris was transferring from the University of Florida.

=== Tennessee State ===
On January 6, 2017, Nashville, Tennessee newspaper (The Tennessean) reported that Treon Harris visited Tennessee State University during the fall and decided to continue his career with the Tigers. Tennessee State coach Rod Reed said "Back during the fall when (Harris) didn't return to Florida and we were dealing with some injuries at quarterback and needed a guy that could come in we started a conversation with him." "He came up and visited for our game against Eastern Kentucky and liked what he saw. We stayed in contact after that." "He completed 50 percent of his passes with 18 touchdowns so he can run and throw the ball." "He's athletic and will fit into our system and what we like to do."

At TSU, Harris will be in competition for the starting quarterback position with O'Shay Ackerman-Carter, who started in seven games as a redshirt freshman in 2015 and three in 2016. Ackerman-Cater suffered season-ending injuries a shoulder injury in 2015 and a knee injury in 2016.

Coach Reed said "O'Shay doesn't mind that we're bringing in another quarterback; O'Shay's a competitor." "Obviously we saw over the last two years we need two really good quarterbacks." Ultimately, Treon Harris would win the competition for the starting quarterback position over Ackerman-Carter, who would transfer from Tennessee State.

For the 2017 season, Harris shared playing time at the quarterback position for Tennessee State Tigers with redshirt sophomore Michael Hughes. Starting in 5 of 6 games played at quarterback, Treon Harris completed 58-of-106 passes for 729 yards with 2 touchdowns and 2 interceptions, in addition to rushing 54 times for 318 yards and 3 touchdowns. Most notably, in the season opener versus FBS Georgia State, Harris put up 236 total yards, including 91 rushing yards and a rushing touchdown, in a 17–10 upset.

On March 19, 2018, The Tennessean reported that Harris transitioned to wide receiver. In the 2018 season, Treon Harris caught 35 passes for 476 yards and 5 touchdowns. After the season, he was named to the 2018 Phil Steele All-Ohio Valley Conference Third Team.

=== College statistics ===
Season	Team	GP	GS	Passing							Rushing			Receiving			
Season	Team	GP	GS	Comp	Att	Pct	Yds	TD	Int	Sacks	Att	Yds	TD	Rec	Yds	Avg	TD
2014	Florida	9	6	55	111	49.5	1,019	9	4	7	75	338	3	0	0	-	0
2015	Florida	12	9	235	119	50.6	1,676	9	6	30	95	244	0	2	-5	-2.5	1
2017	Tennessee State	7	6	58	106	54.7	729	2	2	-	318	54	3	0	0	-	0
2018	Tennessee State	7	2	1	1	100.0	18	1	0	-	0	0	0	35	476	13.6	5
Total		35	23	233	453	51.4	3,442	21	12	37	488	636	3	37	471	12.7	6

== Personal life ==
Treon is the son of Tim "Ice" Harris, a well-known Florida high school football coach. His brother is pro football player and college football coach Brandon Harris. Brandon played college football as a cornerback for the University of Miami before being drafted in the second round of the 2011 NFL draft by the Houston Texans.
