= Jim McElwain =

American football coach (born 1962)

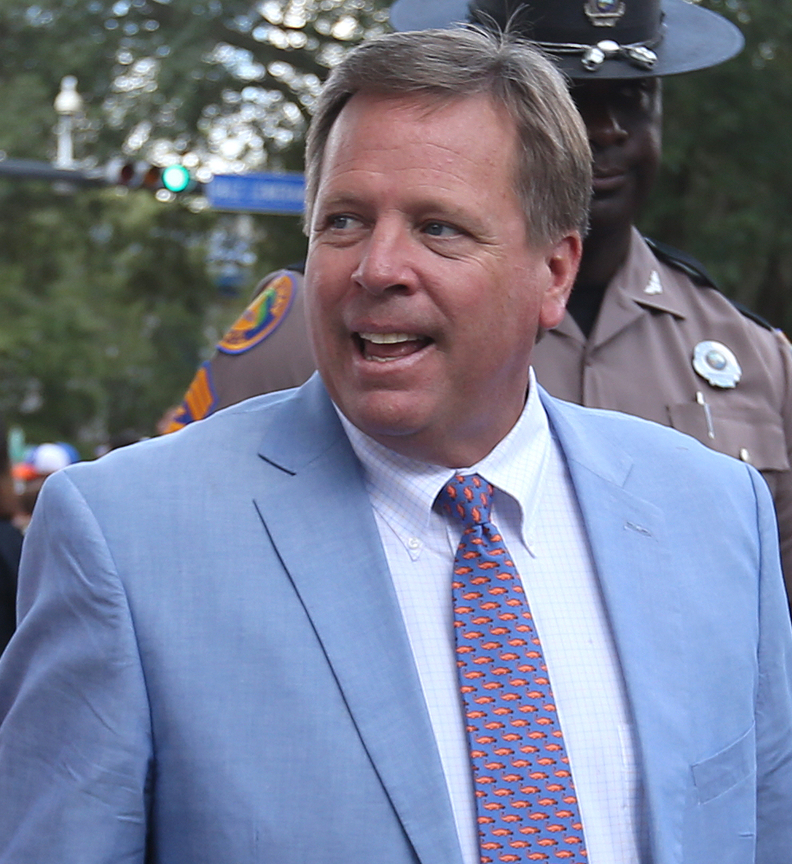
- McElwain in 2016

Current position
- Title: Special assistant to athletic director
- Team: Central Michigan
- Conference: MAC

Biographical details
- Born: March 1, 1962 (age 64); Missoula, Montana, U.S.
- Education: Eastern Washington (1984)

Playing career
- 1980–1983: Eastern Washington
- Position: Quarterback

Coaching career (HC unless noted)
- 1985–1986: Eastern Washington (GA)
- 1987–1994: Eastern Washington (QB/WR)
- 1995–1999: Montana State (OC/WR/ST)
- 2000–2002: Louisville (WR/ST)
- 2003–2005: Michigan State (AHC/WR/ST)
- 2006: Oakland Raiders (QB)
- 2007: Fresno State (OC/QB)
- 2008–2011: Alabama (OC/QB)
- 2012–2014: Colorado State
- 2015–2017: Florida
- 2018: Michigan (WR)
- 2019–2024: Central Michigan

Administrative career (AD unless noted)
- 2025–present: Central Michigan (Special Asst. to AD)

Head coaching record
- Overall: 77–64
- Bowls: 3–2

Accomplishments and honors

Championships
- 2 SEC Eastern Division (2015–2016); 2 MAC West Division (2019, 2021)

Awards
- MW Coach of the Year (2014); SEC Coach of the Year (2015); 2× AFCA Regional Coach of the Year (2014, 2015); MAC Coach of the Year (2019)

James Frank McElwain (born March 1, 1962) is an American former football coach. He was the head football coach at Central Michigan University, a position he held from 2019 to 2024. He announced his retirement at the end of the 2024 season and remained at CMU within the athletics department. McElwain served as the head football coach at the University of Florida from 2015 to 2017, and Colorado State University from 2012 to 2014, where he was named the Mountain West Conference Coach of the Year in 2014. He was the offensive coordinator at the University of Alabama from 2008 to 2011.

== Early life ==
McElwain was born in Missoula, Montana in 1962. He played quarterback at Sentinel High School in Missoula where he was chosen as an all-state quarterback. He then went on to play quarterback in college at Eastern Washington from 1980 to 1983, and he earned a degree in education.

== Coaching career ==
=== Early career ===
After graduating from Eastern Washington, McElwain stayed there as a graduate assistant and was eventually given the job of quarterbacks and receivers coach. During his stint as a coach there from 1985 to 1994 his team made its way to the NCAA Division I-AA playoffs twice and won the Big Sky championship in 1992 under head coach Dick Zornes. From Eastern Washington, McElwain took an offensive coordinator position at Montana State. He enjoyed a successful career with the Bobcats from 1995 to 1999, and coached the offense to the Big Sky Conference's number one scoring offense in 1998 with 31.6 points per game.

McElwain's first coaching job in Division I-A football was at the University of Louisville, where he was the receivers and special teams coach from 2000 to 2002. At Louisville, he tutored All-Conference USA receivers Arnold Jackson, Deion Branch, Damien Dorsey, and Zek Parker. Also his special teams set a school record of nine blocked kicks in 2000–2001 season. He was then offered the assistant head coaching position at Michigan State when he followed Louisville's head coach John L. Smith there. With the Spartans his coaching of the receivers and special teams helped lead them to the Alamo Bowl in his first season.

=== Oakland Raiders ===
McElwain's coaching stint in the National Football League was brief. After his success at Michigan State, he was offered a job to be the quarterback coach for the Oakland Raiders. He was with them for one year in which the Oakland Raiders ended the season 2–14. When head coach Art Shell was dismissed following the season, so were several of the assistant coaches, including McElwain.

=== Return to college football: Fresno State ===
In 2007, McElwain accepted a job to become the offensive coordinator at California State University, Fresno (Fresno State). With the Fresno State Bulldogs, he built a powerhouse offense which ranked 38th in the country averaging 419.5 yards a game and 32nd in the nation in points per game with 32.9. He helped lead the 2007 Fresno State team to a 9–4 record on the year including a win over Georgia Tech in the Humanitarian Bowl.

=== University of Alabama ===
On February 1, 2008, McElwain accepted an offer from Nick Saban to be the offensive coordinator at the University of Alabama. In his first season as offensive coordinator, the Crimson Tide finished the regular season 12–0, before falling to the Florida Gators in the 2008 SEC Championship Game, and the Utah Utes in the 2009 Sugar Bowl.

In 2009, McElwain's offense helped lead the Crimson Tide to a 12–0 regular season record. The team went on to defeat the top-ranked team in the country, the Florida Gators, in the 2009 SEC Championship Game. There his offense dominated the Gators' number one defense in the country and compiled 490 yards of offense, more than twice the yards the Gators defense had averaged giving up all year. McElwain's offense outrushed the Gators' offense 251 yards to 88 yards, 63 of those yards coming from the 2007 Heisman winner Tim Tebow. His offense put up 32 points and held on to the ball for 39 minutes and 37 seconds, almost twice the Gators total of 20 minutes and 23 seconds. Alabama went on to beat the Texas Longhorns in the 2010 BCS National Championship Game. In 2011, the Crimson Tide finished the season with a 12–1 record, and beat the LSU Tigers 21–0 in the 2012 BCS National Championship Game.

=== Colorado State ===
On December 12, 2011, sources revealed that McElwain had accepted the head coaching position with Colorado State. A press conference was held at the Colorado State University Rams indoor practice facility on December 13, 2011, to officially announce the hiring.

McElwain's tenure, dubbed by the school's athletic department as "A Bold New Era", began on a high note. McElwain's Rams rallied from an 11-point deficit to defeat arch-rival Colorado 22–17 at Sports Authority Field in Denver on September 1. McElwain became the first CSU coach to win his debut since Jerry Wampfler in 1970 and the first ever to win his debut against Colorado. The momentum did not last long though as CSU suffered a 22–7 setback in their home opener one week later to defending FCS National Champion North Dakota State, the start of a six-game losing skid. The program showed improvement towards the end of the season, winning three of their final five games to finish 4–8 in McElwain's first season.

McElwain's second season with CSU was much more successful. CSU began the season losing their first two games against Colorado and Tulsa, both of which they had led in the fourth quarter. However, CSU finished the season winning eight of its next 12 games. McElwain finished his second season with a record of 8–6 after CSU's miraculous comeback win in the New Mexico Bowl against Washington State.

McElwain's third season with CSU led to even greater accomplishments. The Rams defeated Colorado in the first game, 31–17. After a Week 2 loss at Boise State, the Rams reeled off nine straight wins, climbing as high as #21 in the national rankings, and being in the conversation for a possible New Year's Day bowl bid. Those hopes were dashed, however, in their final regular season game at Air Force, when the Falcons hit a game-winning field goal as time expired, finishing CSU's regular season at 10–2. Notwithstanding this loss, the Rams were noted for a powerful offense throughout the year. Colorado State averaged 498 yards per game (13th best in the nation), while boasting the nation's second most efficient quarterback in Garrett Grayson and the top receiver by yards per game (149.1) and touchdowns (17) in Rashard Higgins. Under McElwain, the Rams were one of only two "Group of 5" teams with victories in 2014 over two Power 5 conference teams, defeating both Colorado and Boston College.

As a result of the successful transformation of the program, McElwain was named the Mountain West Conference's coach of the year on December 2, 2014.

=== University of Florida ===
McElwain was hired as head coach of the University of Florida Gators in December 2014 by athletics director Jeremy Foley.

The Gators won in McElwain's debut on September 5, 2015, against New Mexico State by a score of 61–13. McElwain led the Gators to a 6–0 start, which included a 38–10 upset against No. 3 Ole Miss that moved the Gators to #11 the following week. The Gators' regular season record under McElwain was 10–2. After the suspension of quarterback Will Grier, the Gators lost to LSU 35–28. McElwain led the Gators to their first SEC Eastern Division championship since 2009 with a 9–7 win over Vanderbilt, becoming the first coach to win an SEC Eastern Division championship in his first year. After clinching the SEC Eastern Division championship, the Gators suffered consecutive blowout losses to Florida State in the regular season finale, to Alabama in the SEC Championship, and to Michigan in the Citrus Bowl, by a combined score of 97–22.

McElwain was named the 2015 SEC Coach of the Year in his first season as the head coach of Florida.

McElwain won a second consecutive Eastern Division title in 2016. However, that season saw a second-half collapse against Tennessee and blowout losses to Arkansas, Florida State, and Alabama in the SEC Championship.

Florida started off the 2017 season with a 33–17 loss to Michigan. After a narrow 26–20 victory over Tennessee off of a game-winning Hail Mary throw, Florida defeated Kentucky 28–27 and Vanderbilt 38–24. On October 7, LSU defeated Florida 17–16. In the following game, Texas A&M defeated Florida 19–17.

During an October 23 press conference, McElwain alluded to death threats against himself and his players. Later that day, Florida officials revealed that McElwain offered "no additional details" about those threats. According to ESPN, this led school officials to seriously consider firing McElwain for cause.

On October 28, the Gators played the rival Georgia Bulldogs. Before the game, there were rumors that Florida officials were considering firing McElwain for cause, though Athletic Director Scott Stricklin stated there were no such discussions. Florida lost to Georgia 42–7. The next day (October 29), McElwain met with Stricklin and other university officials. At that meeting, school officials told McElwain that they intended to fire him for cause, and contended that they did not owe him a buyout because he failed to tell them about the alleged death threats. Ultimately, Florida and McElwain mutually agreed to part ways, effective immediately. Defensive coordinator Randy Shannon served as interim coach for the remainder of the season.

According to a post-mortem by ESPN's Mark Schlabach and Edward Aschoff, relations between McElwain and the administration had been rather strained from the time McElwain arrived on campus. The relationship became even chillier when McElwain frequently criticized the state of the program and the administration's commitment to him. School officials interviewed by ESPN said that McElwain had been "an odd fit" for Florida from the start, and didn't seem to understand "being part of a team." Reportedly, his comments about the supposed threats made it apparent that "this was not going to work." His 34-game tenure in Gainesville was the shortest for a non-interim coach in more than 80 years.

McElwain was also criticized for on-field results that came up well short of what Florida fans had come to expect. He had been hired not just to win games, but to fix an offense that had become among the weakest in the country under his predecessor, Will Muschamp. In Muschamp's final season, the Gators were 96th in the country in total offense. In McElwain's two-plus seasons, the Gators actually regressed, finishing 111th, 116th, and 112th (at the time of his firing). His teams only scored 30 or more points seven times in two-plus years.

=== University of Michigan ===
On February 20, 2018, McElwain was named the wide receivers coach for the Michigan Wolverines. On December 2, 2018, it was announced he would be leaving Michigan to become the next head coach at Central Michigan University.

=== Central Michigan University ===
McElwain was announced as the 29th head football coach of the Central Michigan Chippewas on December 2, 2018. McElwain took over a CMU program that had gone 1–11 in 2018 with no wins against FBS opponents. In his first season with the Chippewas, McElwain led the team to an 8–4 record, and an appearance in the Mid American Conference Championship Game against the Miami Redhawks at Ford Field in Detroit where they lost 26–21.

McElwain was named the Mid American Conference Coach of the Year. On December 9, Central Michigan accepted an invitation to play in the New Mexico Bowl against the San Diego State Aztecs in which Central Michigan lost by a score of 48–11.

In 2020, the Chippewas played a conference-only schedule due to the ongoing COVID-19 pandemic. CMU finished with a 3–3 record, including a win over rival Eastern Michigan.

McElwain and Central Michigan finished the 2021 season with a 9–4 record. They finished as co-champions of the MAC West division, but would lose the tie breaker to Northern Illinois, who defeated the Chippewas 39–38 earlier in the season. Central Michigan defeated Washington State in the Sun Bowl by a score of 24–21.

In the 2022 season, McElwain coached the team to a 4–8 record. On July 24, 2022, he suffered a seizure, resulting in his few-day hospitalization and missing the MAC Media Day (July 26). After the 2022 season, McElwain agreed to a three-year contract extension. In the 2023 season, McElwain led the team to a 5–7 record. On November 20, 2024, McElwain announced his intention to retire from coaching at the conclusion of the 2024 season. In the 2024 season, he coached the team to a 4–8 record.

== Personal life ==
Jim McElwain is married to Karen McElwain, and has two daughters, Johanna and Elizabeth, and one son, Jerrett.

McElwain was radio personality Colin Cowherd's roommate in college at Eastern Washington.

When the McElwains sold their home in Gainesville, Florida, they took a roughly $400,000 loss, which led to media jokes about McElwain taking another loss at Florida. However, this transaction was ultimately a favor to another family. A previous owner of their home had designed it to be accessible to wheelchair users, and the McElwains had converted an eight-car garage into a guest wing. The purchasers, medical equipment company CEO Rick Staab and his wife Michelle, have three children, with the oldest being a wheelchair user due to dystonia, and the second-oldest less seriously affected by the same condition. The Staabs were looking for a larger home, and Rick remembered attending a fundraiser at the McElwain house and realized that it would meet his family's unique needs. The Staabs planned to turn the converted garage, which included a wheelchair lift, into the main house, into an apartment for their oldest child, and felt that the home could be a long-term home for the dystonia charity they had founded more than a decade earlier. Before the McElwains had even listed their home, Rick contacted their real estate agent and made an offer. The McElwains initially considered it a lowball offer, but once they learned that it came from the Staabs, they began discussing a sale and closed on the transaction in early 2018.

The McElwains' living arrangements at Jim's current post at Central Michigan were unique; they lived in a barn a few miles from campus. Shortly after McElwain was hired, he attended a party at the home of the athletic director, which was attended by many of the program's biggest donors, including Chuck McGuirk, the namesake of CMU's basketball arena. When McGuirk asked the McElwains where they planned to live, they told him that they would like to live in a barn. Unknown to the McElwains at the time, McGuirk had purchased a farm a few miles from campus several years earlier that included a 6,000-square-foot barn, and he had considered building living quarters on the lower level. When they visited the farm, they were convinced of the potential, and McGuirk spearheaded its conversion into a combined home and meeting space.

== Head coaching record ==
Year	Team	Overall	Conference	Standing	Bowl/playoffs	Coaches^{#}	AP^{°}
Colorado State Rams (Mountain West Conference) (2012–2014)
2012	Colorado State	4–8	3–5	T–6th			
2013	Colorado State	8–6	5–3	3rd (Mountain)	W New Mexico		
2014	Colorado State	10–2	6–2	T–2nd (Mountain)	Las Vegas (Note: Did not coach bowl game)		
Colorado State:		22–16	14–10				
Florida Gators (Southeastern Conference) (2015–2017)
2015	Florida	10–4	7–2	1st (Eastern)	L Citrus	25	25
2016	Florida	9–4	6–3	1st (Eastern)	W Outback	13	14
2017	Florida	3–4	3–3	(Eastern) (Note: McElwain was fired by Florida prior to the Missouri game. Defensive coordinator Randy Shannon served as interim coach for the remainder of the season)			
Florida:		22–12	16–8				
Central Michigan Chippewas (Mid-American Conference) (2019–2024)
2019	Central Michigan	8–6	6–2	1st (West)	L New Mexico		
2020	Central Michigan	3–3	3–3	4th (West)			
2021	Central Michigan	9–4	6–2	T–1st (West)	W Sun		
2022	Central Michigan	4–8	3–5	T–4th (West)			
2023	Central Michigan	5–7	3–5	T–4th (West)			
2024	Central Michigan	4–8	2–6	T–9th			
Central Michigan:		33–36	23–23				
Total:		77–64					
National championship Conference title Conference division title or championship game berth
^{#}Rankings from final Coaches Poll.; ^{°}Rankings from final AP Poll.
