= 2015 Southeastern Conference football season =

- League: NCAA Division I FBS
- Sport: Football
- Duration: September 3, 2015 through January 11, 2016
- Teams: 14
- Total attendance: 7,507,763
- TV partner(s): ABC, CBS, CBSSN, ESPN, ESPN2, ESPN3, ESPNU, FS1, SECN

2016 NFL Draft
- Top draft pick: Leonard Floyd (Georgia)
- Picked by: Chicago Bears, 9th overall

Regular season
- Season MVP: Derrick Henry (Offensive); Reggie Ragland (Defensive)
- East champions: Florida
- East runners-up: Georgia, Tennessee
- West champions: Alabama
- West runners-up: Ole Miss

SEC Championship Game
- Champions: Alabama
- Runners-up: Florida
- Finals MVP: Derrick Henry

Football seasons
- 2014 2016

2015 Southeastern Conference football standings
	Conf.			Overall
Team	W		L	W		L
Eastern Division
No. 25 Florida x	7	–	1	10	–	4
No. 22 Tennessee	5	–	3	9	–	4
Georgia	5	–	3	10	–	3
Vanderbilt	2	–	6	4	–	8
Kentucky	2	–	6	5	–	7
Missouri*	1	–	7	5	–	7
South Carolina	1	–	7	3	–	9
Western Division
No. 1 Alabama x$#^	7	–	1	14	–	1
No. 10 Ole Miss	6	–	2	10	–	3
Arkansas	5	–	3	8	–	5
No. 16 LSU *	5	–	3	9	–	3
Texas A&M	4	–	4	8	–	5
Mississippi State	4	–	4	9	–	4
Auburn	2	–	6	7	–	6
Championship: Alabama 29, Florida 15
# – College Football Playoff champion; ^ – College Football Playoff participant; $ – Conference champion; x – Division champion/co-champions; * LSU and Missouri vacated all wins due to NCAA violations.; Rankings from AP Poll

The 2015 Southeastern Conference football season represented the 83rd season of SEC football taking place during the 2015 NCAA Division I FBS football season. The season began on September 3 with South Carolina defeating North Carolina on ESPN. This was the fourth season for the SEC under realignment that took place in 2012 adding Texas A&M and Missouri from the Big 12 Conference. The SEC is a Power Five conference under the College Football Playoff format along with the Atlantic Coast Conference, the Big 12 Conference, the Big Ten Conference, and the Pac-12 Conference.

The SEC consists of 14 members: Alabama, Arkansas, Auburn, Florida, Georgia, Kentucky, LSU, Mississippi, Mississippi State, Missouri, South Carolina, Tennessee, Texas A&M, and Vanderbilt; and is split up into the East and West divisions, with the champion of each division meeting in Atlanta to compete for the SEC Championship on December 5. Alabama began the season as defending SEC champions as they defeated Missouri in the previous year's championship game. Alabama would then go on to participate in the first ever College Football Playoff as the number one overall seed, and would lose their semi-final match to eventual National Champion Ohio State by a score of 42–35.

The SEC entered the 2015 season with high expectations, including a record 10 teams ranked in the preseason AP Poll. Great finishes and bowl wins for teams like Tennessee and Arkansas at the conclusion of 2014, in addition to traditional favorites Alabama, Georgia, LSU, and Florida, led many to predict a huge year for the SEC. However, the regular season featured early non-conference upsets including Toledo over Arkansas and Memphis over Ole Miss, and down years from Auburn, Missouri, and South Carolina. Alabama was crowned SEC champions after defeating Florida in the SEC Championship Game, and earned their second consecutive appearance in the College Football Playoff. As the number two overall seed, the Tide defeated Michigan State in the Cotton Bowl 38–0, and capped off the season with a 45–40 victory in the National Championship Game over Clemson. The victory secured Alabama's fourth national championship in seven years, and the eighth national championship for the SEC in ten seasons.

== Preseason ==
=== Recruiting classes ===
National rankings
Team	ESPN	Rivals	Scout	24/7	Total signees
Alabama	#1	#2	#2	#1	24
Arkansas	#22	#25	#22	#23	24
Auburn	#7	#6	#3	#9	27
Florida	#20	#23	#29	#21	20
Georgia	#8	#7	#5	#10	29
Kentucky	#43	#35	#44	#40	23
LSU	#10	#8	#12	#5	25
Ole Miss	#19	#21	#16	#17	22
Mississippi State	#16	#16	#18	#18	28
Missouri	#18	#27	#26	#25	23
South Carolina	#21	#19	#20	#19	31
Tennessee	#5	#5	#4	#4	27
Texas A&M	#12	#10	#10	#12	25
Vanderbilt	#44	#47	#72	#46	18

=== SEC Media Days ===
==== Media Polls ====
The SEC Media Days concluded with its annual preseason media polls. In a surprising result, the media voted Auburn the team most likely to win the SEC championship, while Alabama was selected to win their division, the SEC West. Below are the results of the media poll with total points received next to each school and first-place votes in parentheses.

SEC Champion Voting

- Auburn – 96
- Alabama – 80
- Georgia – 28
- LSU – 9
- Ole Miss – 3
- Arkansas – 3
- Texas A&M – 2
- Mississippi State – 1
- Florida – 1

West

1. Alabama – 1,405 (92)
2. Auburn – 1,362 (108)
3. LSU – 870 (10)
4. Arkansas – 821 (6)
5. Ole Miss – 732 (3)
6. Texas A&M – 628 (4)
7. Mississippi State – 482 (2)

East

1. Georgia – 1,498 (166)
2. Tennessee – 1,231 (36)
3. Missouri – 1,196 (20)
4. South Carolina – 830 (1)
5. Florida – 768 (1)
6. Kentucky – 534 (1)
7. Vanderbilt – 243 (0)

==== Preseason All-SEC: Media ====
First Team Offense
Position	Player	Class	Team
QB	Dak Prescott	SR	Mississippi State
RB	Nick Chubb	SO	Georgia
RB	Leonard Fournette	SO	LSU
WR	Laquon Treadwell	JR	Ole Miss
WR	D'haquille Williams	SR	Auburn
TE	Evan Engram	JR	Ole Miss
OL	Cam Robinson	SO	Alabama
OL	Laremy Tunsil	JR	Ole Miss
OL	Vadal Alexander	SR	LSU
OL	John Theus	SR	Georgia
C	Ryan Kelly	SR	Alabama

First Team Defense
Position	Player	Class	Team
DL	Robert Nkemdiche	JR	Ole Miss
DL	A'Shawn Robinson	JR	Alabama
DL	Myles Garrett	SO	Texas A&M
DL	Carl Lawson	SO	Auburn
LB	Reggie Ragland	SR	Alabama
LB	Jordan Jenkins	SR	Georgia
LB	Curt Maggitt	SR	Tennessee
DB	Vernon Hargreaves III	JR	Florida
DB	Cyrus Jones	SR	Alabama
DB	Jonathan Jones	SR	Auburn
DB	Jalen Mills	SR	LSU

First Team Special Teams
Position	Player	Class	Team
P	J. K. Scott	SO	Alabama
K	Marshall Morgan	SR	Georgia
RS	Speedy Noil	SO	Texas A&M
AP	Pharoh Cooper	JR	South Carolina

==== Preseason All-SEC: Coaches ====
First Team Offense
Position	Player	Class	Team
QB	Dak Prescott	SR	Mississippi State
RB	Nick Chubb	SO	Georgia
RB	Leonard Fournette	SO	LSU
WR	Laquon Treadwell	JR	Ole Miss
WR	Pharoh Cooper	JR	South Carolina
TE	Evan Engram	JR	Ole Miss
OL	Cam Robinson	SO	Alabama
OL	Laremy Tunsil	JR	Ole Miss
OL	Vadal Alexander	SR	LSU
OL	John Theus	SR	Georgia
C	Mike Matthews	SR	Texas A&M
AP	Pharoh Cooper	JR	South Carolina

First Team Defense
Position	Player	Class	Team
DL	Robert Nkemdiche	JR	Ole Miss
DL	A'Shawn Robinson	JR	Alabama
DL	Myles Garrett	SO	Texas A&M
DL	Chris Jones	JR	Mississippi State
LB	Reggie Ragland	SR	Alabama
LB	Jordan Jenkins	SR	Georgia
LB	Curt Maggitt	SR	Tennessee
DB	Vernon Hargreaves III	JR	Florida
DB	Cyrus Jones	SR	Alabama
DB	Jonathan Jones	SR	Auburn
DB	Jalen Mills	SR	LSU

First Team Special Teams
Position	Player	Class	Team
P	J. K. Scott	SO	Alabama
K	Marshall Morgan	SR	Georgia
RS	Pharoh Cooper	JR	South Carolina

== Head coaches ==
Only one SEC team changed head coaches for the 2015 season. Jim McElwain was hired to replace Will Muschamp at Florida. Muschamp's four-year tenure was filled with highs and lows, but he announced his resignation at the end of the season compiling a 28–22 record as the head coach, 17–15 in the SEC. Muschamp agreed to become the defensive coordinator for Auburn following his resignation. McElwain takes over the Gators after leading Colorado State to a 22–16 record in three seasons, turning the program into one of the best offensive teams in the country. McElwain had previously served as Alabama's offensive coordinator under Nick Saban from 2008 to 2011, winning two national titles.

On October 12, halfway through the season with a 2–4 record (0–4 in SEC play), South Carolina head coach Steve Spurrier unexpectedly resigned. Concerning his resignation Spurrier said, "My answer has always been the same: If it starts going south, starts going bad, then I need to get out. ... It's time for me to get out of the way and give somebody else a go at it." Spurrier was in his 11th season as head coach of the Gamecocks compiling a record of 86–49, the most wins in school history. After the resignation, offensive coordinator Shawn Elliott took over head coaching duties.

Another coaching change took place during the season when on November 14, Missouri head coach Gary Pinkel announced that he would be resigning from his position at the conclusion of the season. Pinkel said he was resigning for health reasons, citing his diagnoses with lymphoma earlier in May. The announcement came during a tumultuous time in Columbia as the university and community were also dealing with race relation issues which lead to the school's president and chancellor also resigning. Upon completing his 15th season at Missouri, Pinkel will finish his coaching career with the most wins, games coached, and bowl victories in program history.

Two days after the regular season ended, the University of Georgia made the decision to fire 15th year head coach, Mark Richt. Richt finished his head coaching career at Georgia with a record of 145–51, the second-most wins in school history, 2 SEC championships, and a record of 9–5 in bowl games. Richt was replaced by long-time Alabama defensive coordinator, Kirby Smart, a Georgia alumnae and former player. It is Smart's first head coaching job. Only 3 days after leaving Georgia, Richt was announced as the new head coach for the Miami Hurricanes, where he also is a former alumnae and player.

Note: The stats shown are before the beginning of the season.

Team	Head coach	Years at school	Overall record	Record at school	SEC record
Alabama	Nick Saban	9	177–59–1	86–17	50–11
Arkansas	Bret Bielema	3	78–39	10–15	2–14
Auburn	Gus Malzahn	3	29–10	20–7	11–5
Florida	Jim McElwain	1	22–16	0–0	0–0
Georgia	Mark Richt	15	136–48	136–48	78–34
Kentucky	Mark Stoops	3	7–17	7–17	2–14
LSU	Les Miles	11	131–50	103–29	56–24
Ole Miss	Hugh Freeze	4	54–22	24–15	11–13
Mississippi State	Dan Mullen	7	46–31	46–31	22–26
Missouri	Gary Pinkel	15	186–103–3	113–66	16–8
South Carolina	Steve Spurrier	11	226–85–2	84–45	44–36
Tennessee	Butch Jones	3	62–40	12–13	5–11
Texas A&M	Kevin Sumlin	4	63–28	28–11	13–11
Vanderbilt	Derek Mason	2	3–9	3–9	0–8

== Rankings ==
Legend
	Increase in ranking
	Decrease in ranking
	Not ranked previous week
RV	Received votes but were not ranked in Top 25 of poll

		Pre	Wk 1	Wk 2	Wk 3	Wk 4	Wk 5	Wk 6	Wk 7	Wk 8	Wk 9	Wk 10	Wk 11	Wk 12	Wk 13	Wk 14	Final
Alabama	AP	3	2	2	12	13	8	10	8	7 (1)	7 (1)	3 (2)	3 (4)	2 (6)	2 (8)	2 (9)	1 (61)
Alabama	C	3 (1)	2 (1)	2 (1)	12	13	10	9	8	7	7	4 (3)	3 (4)	2 (5)	2 (8)	2 (5)	1 (56)
Alabama	CFP	Not released									4	2	2	2	2	2	
Arkansas	AP	18	18	RV									RV	RV	RV		RV
Arkansas	C	20	18	RV								RV	RV	RV			RV
Arkansas	CFP	Not released															
Auburn	AP	6	6	18	RV												
Auburn	C	7	7	15	25	RV											
Auburn	CFP	Not released															
Florida	AP	RV	RV	RV	RV	25	11	8	13	11	11	11	8	10	18	19	25
Florida	C	RV	RV	RV	RV	23	12	11	14	12	12	10	8	9	15	18	25
Florida	CFP	Not released									10	11	8	12	18	19	
Georgia	AP	9	10	7	7	8	19	RV	RV	RV			RV	RV	RV	RV	RV
Georgia	C	9	9	8	6	6	16	RV	25	23		RV	RV	RV	RV	25	24
Georgia	CFP	Not released															
Kentucky	AP							RV									
Kentucky	C	RV		RV		RV	RV	RV									
Kentucky	CFP	Not released															
LSU	AP	14	14	13	8 (1)	9	7	6	5 (1)	4 (5)	4 (5)	9	17	RV	23	22	16
LSU	C	13	15	14	9	8	5 (1)	5 (1)	5 (1)	4 (1)	4 (1)	9	17	RV	23	21	17
LSU	CFP	Not released									2	9	15		21	20	
Mississippi State	AP	RV	25	RV	RV	21	RV	RV	RV	25	24	20	RV	23	RV	RV	RV
Mississippi State	C	RV	RV	RV	RV	22	RV	RV	RV	RV	25	20	25	22	RV	RV	RV
Mississippi State	CFP	Not released									20	17		21			
Missouri	AP	24	21	22	25		RV										
Missouri	C	23	21	20	23	RV	RV										
Missouri	CFP	Not released															
Ole Miss	AP	17	17	15	3 (11)	3 (10)	14	13	24	19	19	RV	25	19	16	16	10
Ole Miss	C	15	14	11	5	5 (1)	13	12	23	21	19	RV	25	19	17	15	9
Ole Miss	CFP	Not released									18		22	18	13	12	
South Carolina	AP																
South Carolina	C	RV	RV	RV													
South Carolina	CFP	Not released															
Tennessee	AP	25	23	RV	RV	RV					RV			RV	RV	RV	22
Tennessee	C	25	23	RV	RV	RV		RV							RV	RV	23
Tennessee	CFP	Not released													25	23	
Texas A&M	AP	RV	16	17	14	14	9 (1)	9 (1)	15	RV	25	RV	RV	RV			
Texas A&M	C	RV	19	18	15	15	11	10	16	RV	24	RV	RV	RV	RV	RV	
Texas A&M	CFP	Not released									19						
Vanderbilt	AP																
Vanderbilt	C																
Vanderbilt	CFP	Not released															

== Regular season ==
Index to colors and formatting
Non-conference matchup; SEC member won
Non-conference matchup; SEC member lost
Conference matchup

All times Eastern time. SEC teams in bold.

Rankings reflect those of the AP poll for that week until week 10 when CFP rankings are used.

=== Week One ===
Date	Time	Visiting team	Home team	Site	Broadcast	Result	Attendance	Reference
September 3	6:00 p.m.	North Carolina	**South Carolina**	Bank of America Stadium • Charlotte, North Carolina	ESPN	**W** 17–13	51,664	
September 3	8:00 p.m.	Western Kentucky	**Vanderbilt**	Vanderbilt Stadium • Nashville, Tennessee	SECN	**L** 12–14	30,307	
September 5	12:00 p.m.	Louisiana-Monroe	#9 **Georgia**	Sanford Stadium • Athens, Georgia	SECN	**W** 51–14	92,746	
September 5	12:00 p.m.	Tennessee-Martin	#17 **Ole Miss**	Vaught–Hemingway Stadium • Oxford, Mississippi	SECN	**W** 76–3	60,186	
September 5	3:30 p.m.	UTEP	#18 **Arkansas**	Donald W. Reynolds Razorback Stadium • Fayetteville, Arkansas	ESPNU	**W** 48–13	67,708	
September 5	3:30 p.m.	Louisville	#6 **Auburn**	Georgia Dome • Atlanta	CBS	**W** 31–24	73,927	
September 5	4:00 p.m.	Southeast Missouri State	#24 **Missouri**	Faurot Field • Columbia, Missouri	SECN	**W** 34–3	64,670	
September 5	4:00 p.m.	Bowling Green	#25 **Tennessee**	Nissan Stadium • Nashville, Tennessee	SECN	**W** 59–0	61,323	
September 5	7:00 p.m.	#15 Arizona State	**Texas A&M**	NRG Stadium • Houston, Texas	ESPN	**W** 38–17	66,308	
September 5	7:00 p.m.	Louisiana-Lafayette	**Kentucky**	Commonwealth Stadium • Lexington, Kentucky	ESPNU	**W** 40–33	62,933	
September 5	7:30 p.m.	McNeese State	#14 **LSU**	Tiger Stadium • Baton Rouge, Louisiana	SECN	**Canceled**^{[a]}		
September 5	7:30 p.m.	New Mexico State	**Florida**	Ben Hill Griffin Stadium • Gainesville, Florida	SECN	**W** 63–14	90,227	
September 5	8:00 p.m.	#20 Wisconsin	#3 **Alabama**	AT&T Stadium • Arlington, Texas	ABC	**W** 35–17	64,279	
September 5	10:00 p.m.	**Mississippi State**	Southern Miss	M. M. Roberts Stadium • Hattiesburg, Mississippi	FS1	**W** 34–16	36,641	

^{^[a]}The game between LSU and McNeese State was canceled due to inclement weather. The game was delayed due to lightning after 5 minutes of play during each team held the ball for one drive and no one scored. Both schools' athletic directors decided not to reschedule the game, thus declaring it a "no contest". LSU agreed to pay McNeese State its promised fee of $500,000.

Players of the week:

Offensive		Offensive lineman		Defensive		Defensive lineman		Special teams		Freshman	
Player	Team	Player	Team	Player	Team	Player	Team	Player	Team	Player	Team
Derrick Henry	Alabama	Kyler Kerbyson	Tennessee	Skai Moore	South Carolina	Daeshon Hall	Texas A&M	Daniel Carlson	Auburn	Christian Kirk	Texas A&M

=== Week Two ===
Date	Time	Visiting team	Home team	Site	Broadcast	Result	Attendance	Reference
September 12	12:00 p.m.	Jacksonville State	#6 **Auburn**	Jordan–Hare Stadium • Auburn, Alabama	SECN	**W** 27–20 ^{OT}	87,451	
September 12	3:30 p.m.	Fresno State	#17 **Ole Miss**	Vaught–Hemingway Stadium • Oxford, Mississippi	ESPN2	**W** 73–21	60,302	
September 12	3:30 p.m.	#10 **Georgia**	**Vanderbilt**	Vanderbilt Stadium • Nashville, Tennessee	CBS	**UGA** 31–14	37,185	
September 12	4:00 p.m.	Middle Tennessee	#2 **Alabama**	Bryant–Denny Stadium • Tuscaloosa, Alabama	SECN	**W** 37–10	98,568	
September 12	4:00 p.m.	Toledo	#18 **Arkansas**	War Memorial Stadium • Little Rock, Arkansas	SECN	**L** 12–16	49,591	
September 12	6:00 p.m.	#19 Oklahoma	#23 **Tennessee**	Neyland Stadium • Knoxville, Tennessee	ESPN	**L** 24–31 ^{2OT}	102,455	
September 12	7:00 p.m.	#21 **Missouri**	Arkansas State	Centennial Bank Stadium • Jonesboro, Arkansas	ESPN3	**W** 27–20	29,143	
September 12	7:00 p.m.	Ball State	#16 **Texas A&M**	Kyle Field • College Station, Texas	ESPNU	**W** 56–23	104,213	
September 12	7:00 p.m.	East Carolina	**Florida**	Ben Hill Griffin Stadium • Gainesville, Florida	ESPN2	**W** 31–24	88,034	
September 12	7:30 p.m.	**Kentucky**	**South Carolina**	Williams-Brice Stadium • Columbia, South Carolina	SECN	**UK** 26–22	82,178	
September 12	9:15 p.m.	#14 **LSU**	#25 **Mississippi State**	Davis Wade Stadium • Starkville, Mississippi	ESPN	**LSU** 21–19	62,531	

Players of the week:

Offensive		Offensive lineman		Defensive		Defensive lineman		Special teams		Freshman	
Player	Team	Player	Team	Player	Team	Player	Team	Player	Team	Player	Team
Leonard Fournette	LSU	Ethan Pocic	LSU	Kentrell Brothers	Missouri	Jordan Jenkins	Georgia	Isaiah McKenzie	Georgia	Chris Westry	Kentucky

=== Week Three ===
Date	Time	Visiting team	Home team	Site	Broadcast	Result	Attendance	Reference
September 19	12:00 p.m.	Connecticut	#22 **Missouri**	Faurot Field • Columbia, Missouri	ESPN	**W** 9–6	70,079	
September 19	12:00 p.m.	Nevada	#17 **Texas A&M**	Kyle Field • College Station, Texas	SECN	**W** 44–27	102,591	
September 19	3:30 p.m.	#18 **Auburn**	#13 **LSU**	Tiger Stadium • Baton Rouge, Louisiana	CBS	**LSU** 45–21	102,321	
September 19	4:00 p.m.	Northwestern State	**Mississippi State**	Davis Wade Stadium • Starkville, Mississippi	SECN	**W** 62–13	61,574	
September 19	4:00 p.m.	Austin Peay	**Vanderbilt**	Vanderbilt Stadium • Nashville, Tennessee	SECN	**W** 47–7	31,399	
September 19	6:00 p.m	**South Carolina**	#7 **Georgia**	Sanford Stadium • Athens, Georgia	ESPN	**UGA** 52–20	92,746	
September 19	7:00 p.m.	Texas Tech	**Arkansas**	Donald W. Reynolds Razorback Stadium • Fayetteville, Arkansas	ESPN2	**L** 24–35	73,334	
September 19	7:00 p.m.	Western Carolina	**Tennessee**	Neyland Stadium • Knoxville, Tennessee	ESPNU	**W** 55–10	102,136	
September 19	7:30 p.m.	**Florida**	**Kentucky**	Commonwealth Stadium • Lexington, Kentucky	SECN	**FLA** 14–9	63,040	
September 19	9:15 p.m.	#15 **Ole Miss**	#2 **Alabama**	Bryant–Denny Stadium • Tuscaloosa, Alabama	ESPN	**MISS** 43–37	101,821	

Players of the week:

Co–Offensive		Offensive lineman		Defensive		Defensive lineman		Special teams		Freshman	
Player	Team	Player	Team	Player	Team	Player	Team	Player	Team	Player	Team
Leonard Fournette; Greyson Lambert	LSU; Georgia	Vadal Alexander	LSU	Robert Nkemdiche	Ole Miss	Jonathan Bullard	Florida	Gary Wunderlich	Ole Miss	Preston Williams	Tennessee

=== Week Four ===
Date	Time	Visiting team	Home team	Site	Broadcast	Result	Attendance	Reference
September 26	12:00 p.m.	Southern	#7 **Georgia**	Sanford Stadium • Athens, Georgia	SECN	**W** 48–6	92,746	
September 26	12:00 p.m.	UCF	**South Carolina**	Williams-Brice Stadium • Columbia, South Carolina	ESPNU	**W** 31–14	78,411	
September 26	12:00 p.m.	#8 **LSU**	Syracuse	Carrier Dome • Syracuse, New York	ESPN	**W** 34–24	43,101	
September 26	3:30 p.m.	**Tennessee**	**Florida**	Ben Hill Griffin Stadium • Gainesville, Florida	CBS	**FLA** 28–27	90,527	
September 26	4:00 p.m.	Louisiana-Monroe	#12 **Alabama**	Bryant–Denny Stadium • Tuscaloosa, Alabama	SECN	**W** 34–0	101,323	
September 26	7:00 p.m.	**Vanderbilt**	#3 **Ole Miss**	Vaught–Hemingway Stadium • Oxford, Mississippi	ESPNU	**MISS** 27–16	60,654	
September 26	7:00 p.m.	#14 **Texas A&M**	**Arkansas**	AT&T Stadium • Arlington, Texas	ESPN	**TAMU** 28–21 ^{OT}	67,339	
September 26	7:30 p.m.	**Mississippi State**	**Auburn**	Jordan–Hare Stadium • Auburn, Alabama	ESPN2	**MISS ST** 17–9	87,451	
September 26	7:30 p.m.	#25 **Missouri**	**Kentucky**	Commonwealth Stadium • Lexington, Kentucky	SECN	**UK** 21–13	58,008	

Players of the week:

Offensive		Offensive lineman		Defensive		Defensive lineman		Special teams		Freshman	
Player	Team	Player	Team	Player	Team	Player	Team	Player	Team	Player	Team
Leonard Fournette	LSU	Fahn Cooper	Ole Miss	Richie Brown	Mississippi State	Cory Johnson	Kentucky	Christian Kirk	Texas A&M	Antonio Callaway	Florida

=== Week Five ===
Date	Time	Visiting team	Home team	Site	Broadcast	Result	Attendance	Reference
October 3	12:00 p.m	**South Carolina**	**Missouri**	Faurot Field • Columbia, Missouri	SECN	**MIZZOU** 24–10	66,751	
October 3	3:30 p.m.	#13 **Alabama**	#8 **Georgia**	Sanford Stadium • Athens, Georgia	CBS	**ALA** 38–10	92,746	
October 3	4:00 p.m.	San Jose State	**Auburn**	Jordan–Hare Stadium • Auburn, Alabama	SECN	**W** 35–21	87,451	
October 3	7:00 p.m.	Eastern Michigan	#9 **LSU**	Tiger Stadium • Baton Rouge, Louisiana	ESPNU	**W** 44–22	102,321	
October 3	7:00 p.m.	**Vanderbilt**	Middle Tennessee	Johnny "Red" Floyd Stadium • Murfreesboro, Tennessee	CBSSN	**W** 17–13	25,411	
October 3	7:00 p.m.	#3 **Ole Miss**	#25 **Florida**	Ben Hill Griffin Stadium • Gainesville, Florida	ESPN	**FLA** 38–10	90,585	
October 3	7:00 p.m.	**Arkansas**	**Tennessee**	Neyland Stadium • Knoxville, Tennessee	ESPN2	**ARK** 24–20	101,265	
October 3	7:30 p.m.	#21 **Mississippi State**	#14 **Texas A&M**	Kyle Field • College Station, Texas	SECN	**TAMU** 30–17	104,455	
October 3	7:30 p.m.	Eastern Kentucky	**Kentucky**	Commonwealth Stadium • Lexington, Kentucky	SECN	**W** 34–27 ^{OT}	63,380	

Players of the week:

Offensive		Offensive lineman		Defensive		Defensive lineman		Special teams		Freshman	
Player	Team	Player	Team	Player	Team	Player	Team	Player	Team	Player	Team
Derrick Henry	Alabama	Sebastian Tretola	Arkansas	Antonio Morrison	Florida	Myles Garrett	Texas A&M	Johnathan Ford	Auburn	Calvin Ridley	Alabama

=== Week Six ===
Date	Time	Visiting team	Home team	Site	Broadcast	Result	Attendance	Reference
October 10	12:00 p.m.	New Mexico State	#14 **Ole Miss**	Vaught–Hemingway Stadium • Oxford, Mississippi	SECN	**W** 52–3	60,154	
October 10	3:30 p.m.	#7 **LSU**	**South Carolina**	Tiger Stadium • Baton Rouge, Louisiana^{[a]}	ESPN	**LSU** 45–24	42,058	
October 10	3:30 p.m.	#19 **Georgia**	**Tennessee**	Neyland Stadium • Knoxville, Tennessee	CBS	**TENN** 38–31	102,455	
October 10	4:00 p.m.	Troy	**Mississippi State**	Davis Wade Stadium • Starkville, Mississippi	SECN	**W** 45–17	60,866	
October 10	7:00 p.m.	**Arkansas**	#8 **Alabama**	Bryant–Denny Stadium • Tuscaloosa, Alabama	ESPN	**ALA** 27–14	101,821	
October 10	7:30 p.m.	#11 **Florida**	**Missouri**	Faurot Field • Columbia, Missouri	SECN	**FLA** 21–3	70,767	

^{^[a]}Due to severe damage to the Columbia area as a result of the 2015 South Carolina floods, the LSU-South Carolina game was relocated to Baton Rouge.

Players of the week:

Offensive		Offensive lineman		Defensive		Defensive lineman		Special teams		Freshman	
Player	Team	Player	Team	Player	Team	Player	Team	Player	Team	Player	Team
Joshua Dobbs	Tennessee	Ethan Pocic	LSU	Reggie Ragland	Alabama	Ryan Brown	Mississippi State	Reggie Davis	Georgia	Derrius Guice	LSU

=== Week Seven ===
Date	Time	Visiting team	Home team	Site	Broadcast	Result	Attendance	Reference
October 15	7:00 p.m.	**Auburn**	**Kentucky**	Commonwealth Stadium • Lexington, Kentucky	ESPN	**AUB** 30–27	63,407	
October 17	12:00 p.m.	#13 **Ole Miss**	Memphis	Liberty Bowl Memorial Stadium • Memphis, Tennessee	ABC	**L** 24–37	60,241	
October 17	12:00 p.m.	Louisiana Tech	**Mississippi State**	Davis Wade Stadium • Starkville, Mississippi	SECN	**W** 45–20	61,651	
October 17	3:30 p.m.	#10 **Alabama**	#9 **Texas A&M**	Kyle Field • College Station, Texas	CBS	**ALA** 41–23	105,733	
October 17	4:00 p.m.	**Vanderbilt**	**South Carolina**	Williams-Brice Stadium • Columbia, South Carolina	SECN	**SCAR** 19–10	75,159	
October 17	7:00 p.m.	#8 **Florida**	#6 **LSU**	Tiger Stadium • Baton Rouge, Louisiana	ESPN	**LSU** 35–28	102,321	
October 17	7:30 p.m.	**Missouri**	**Georgia**	Sanford Stadium • Athens, Georgia	SECN	**UGA** 9–6	92,746	

Players of the week:

Offensive		Offensive lineman		Defensive		Defensive lineman		Special teams		Freshman	
Player	Team	Player	Team	Player	Team	Player	Team	Player	Team	Player	Team
Derrick Henry	Alabama	Vadal Alexander	LSU	Lewis Neal	LSU	Myles Garrett	Texas A&M	Marshall Morgan	Georgia	Minkah Fitzpatrick	Alabama

=== Week Eight ===
Date	Time	Visiting team	Home team	Site	Broadcast	Result	Attendance	Reference
October 24	12:00 p.m.	**Auburn**	**Arkansas**	Donald W. Reynolds Razorback Stadium • Fayetteville, Arkansas	SECN	**ARK** 54–46 ^{4OT}	72,008	
October 24	3:30 p.m.	**Tennessee**	#8 **Alabama**	Bryant–Denny Stadium • Tuscaloosa, Alabama	CBS	**ALA** 19–14	101,821	
October 24	4:00 p.m.	**Missouri**	**Vanderbilt**	Vanderbilt Stadium • Nashville, Tennessee	SECN	**VANDY** 10–3	31,128	
October 24	7:00 p.m.	#15 **Texas A&M**	#24 **Ole Miss**	Vaught–Hemingway Stadium • Oxford, Mississippi	ESPN	**MISS** 23–3	60,674	
October 24	7:00 p.m.	Western Kentucky	#5 **LSU**	Tiger Stadium • Baton Rouge, Louisiana	ESPNU	**W** 48–20	101,561	
October 24	7:30 p.m.	**Kentucky**	**Mississippi State**	Davis Wade Stadium • Starkville, Mississippi	SECN	**MISS ST** 42–16	61,168	

Players of the week:

Offensive		Offensive lineman		Defensive		Defensive lineman		Special teams		Freshman	
Player	Team	Player	Team	Player	Team	Player	Team	Player	Team	Player	Team
Dak Prescott	Mississippi State	Spencer Pulley	Vanderbilt	Trae Elston	Ole Miss	Marquis Haynes	Ole Miss	J. K. Scott	Alabama	Dre Greenlaw	Arkansas

=== Week Nine ===
Date	Time	Visiting team	Home team	Site	Broadcast	Result	Attendance	Reference
October 31	12:00 p.m.	#19 **Ole Miss**	**Auburn**	Jordan–Hare Stadium • Auburn, Alabama	ESPN	**MISS** 27–19	87,451	
October 31	12:00 p.m.	**South Carolina**	**Texas A&M**	Kyle Field • College Station, Texas	SECN	**TAMU** 35–28	102,154	
October 31	3:30 p.m.	**Georgia**	#11 **Florida**	EverBank Field • Jacksonville, Florida	CBS	**FLA** 27–3	84,628	
October 31	4:00 p.m.	Tennessee-Martin	**Arkansas**	Donald W. Reynolds Razorback Stadium • Fayetteville, Arkansas	SECN	**W** 63–28	64,206	
October 31	7:00 p.m.	**Vanderbilt**	#18 Houston	TDECU Stadium • Houston, Texas	ESPN2	**L** 0–34	29,565	
October 31	7:30 p.m.	**Tennessee**	**Kentucky**	Commonwealth Stadium • Lexington, Kentucky	SECN	**TENN** 52–21	60,886	

Players of the week:

Offensive		Offensive lineman		Defensive		Defensive lineman		Special teams		Freshman	
Player	Team	Player	Team	Player	Team	Player	Team	Player	Team	Player	Team
Chad Kelly	Ole Miss	Mitch Smothers	Arkansas	Antonio Morrison	Florida	Marquis Haynes	Ole Miss	Evan Berry	Tennessee	Kyler Murray	Texas A&M

=== Week Ten ===
Date	Time	Visiting team	Home team	Site	Broadcast	Result	Attendance	Reference
November 5	9:00 p.m.	#20 **Mississippi State**	**Missouri**	Faurot Field • Columbia, Missouri	ESPN	**MISS ST** 31–13	58,878	
November 7	12:00 p.m.	**Vanderbilt**	#10 **Florida**	Ben Hill Griffin Stadium • Gainesville, Florida	ESPN	**FLA** 9–7	90,061	
November 7	12:00 p.m.	**Kentucky**	**Georgia**	Sanford Stadium • Athens, Georgia	SECN	**UGA** 27–3	92,746	
November 7	3:30 p.m.	**Arkansas**	#18 **Ole Miss**	Vaught–Hemingway Stadium • Oxford, Mississippi	CBS	**ARK** 53–52 ^{OT}	60,680	
November 7	4:00 p.m.	**South Carolina**	**Tennessee**	Neyland Stadium • Knoxville, Tennessee	SECN	**TENN** 27–24	101,253	
November 7	7:30 p.m.	**Auburn**	#19 **Texas A&M**	Kyle Field • College Station, Texas	SECN	**AUB** 26–10	104,625	
November 7	8:00 p.m.	#2 **LSU**	#4 **Alabama**	Bryant–Denny Stadium • Tuscaloosa, Alabama	CBS	**ALA** 30–16	101,821	

Players of the week:

Offensive		Offensive lineman		Defensive		Defensive lineman		Special teams		Freshman	
Player	Team	Player	Team	Player	Team	Player	Team	Player	Team	Player	Team
Brandon Allen	Arkansas	Ryan Kelly	Alabama	Alex McCalister	Florida	Chris Jones	Mississippi State	Adam Griffith	Alabama	Darrin Kirkland	Tennessee

=== Week Eleven ===
Date	Time	Visiting team	Home team	Site	Broadcast	Result	Attendance	Reference
November 14	12:00 p.m.	**Georgia**	**Auburn**	Jordan–Hare Stadium • Auburn, Alabama	CBS	**UGA** 20–13	87,451	
November 14	12:00 p.m.	#11 **Florida**	**South Carolina**	Williams-Brice Stadium • Columbia, South Carolina	ESPN	**FLA** 24–14	78,536	
November 14	12:00 p.m.	North Texas	**Tennessee**	Neyland Stadium • Knoxville, Tennessee	SECN	**W** 24–0	96,197	
November 14	3:30 p.m.	#2 **Alabama**	#17 **Mississippi State**	Davis Wade Stadium • Starkville, Mississippi	CBS	**ALA** 31–6	62,435	
November 14	4:00 p.m.	**Kentucky**	**Vanderbilt**	Vanderbilt Stadium • Nashville, Tennessee	SECN	**VANDY** 21–17	30,301	
November 14	7:00 p.m.	Western Carolina	**Texas A&M**	Kyle Field • College Station, Texas	ESPNU	**W** 41–17	101,583	
November 14	7:15 p.m.	**Arkansas**	#9 **LSU**	Tiger Stadium • Baton Rouge, Louisiana	ESPN	**ARK** 31–14	101,699	
November 14	7:30 p.m.	BYU	**Missouri**	Arrowhead Stadium • Kansas City, Missouri	SECN	**W** 20–16	42,824	

Players of the week:

Offensive		Offensive lineman		Defensive		Defensive lineman		Special teams		Freshman	
Player	Team	Player	Team	Player	Team	Player	Team	Player	Team	Player	Team
Derrick Henry	Alabama	Dan Skipper	Arkansas	Oren Burks	Vanderbilt	Jonathan Allen	Alabama	Isaiah McKenzie	Georgia	Dre Greenlaw	Arkansas

=== Week Twelve ===
Date	Time	Visiting team	Home team	Site	Broadcast	Result	Attendance	Reference
November 21	12:00 p.m.	Florida Atlantic	#8 **Florida**	Ben Hill Griffin Stadium • Gainesville, Florida	SECN	**W** 20–14 ^{OT}	90,107	
November 21	12:00 p.m.	The Citadel	**South Carolina**	Williams-Brice Stadium • Columbia, South Carolina	SECN	**L** 22–23	77,241	
November 21	3:30 p.m.	#15 **LSU**	#22 **Ole Miss**	Vaught–Hemingway Stadium • Oxford, Mississippi	CBS	**MISS** 38–17	60,705	
November 21	4:00 p.m.	Charleston Southern	#2 **Alabama**	Bryant–Denny Stadium • Tuscaloosa, Alabama	SECN	**W** 56–6	100,611	
November 21	4:00 p.m.	Idaho	**Auburn**	Jordan–Hare Stadium • Auburn, Alabama	SECN	**W** 56–34	87,451	
November 21	7:00 p.m.	**Mississippi State**	**Arkansas**	Donald W. Reynolds Razorback Stadium • Fayetteville, Arkansas	ESPN	**MISS ST** 51–50	71,936	
November 21	7:00 p.m.	Georgia Southern	**Georgia**	Sanford Stadium • Athens, Georgia	ESPNU	**W** 23–17 ^{OT}	92,746	
November 21	7:15 p.m.	**Tennessee**	**Missouri**	Faurot Field • Columbia, Missouri	ESPN2	**TENN** 19–8	59,575	
November 21	7:30 p.m.	**Texas A&M**	**Vanderbilt**	Vanderbilt Stadium • Nashville, Tennessee	SECN	**TAMU** 25–0	32,482	
November 21	7:30 p.m.	Charlotte	**Kentucky**	Commonwealth Stadium • Lexington, Kentucky	SECN	**W** 58–10	56,195	

Players of the week:

Offensive		Offensive lineman		Defensive		Defensive lineman		Co–Special teams		Freshman	
Player	Team	Player	Team	Player	Team	Player	Team	Player	Team	Player	Team
Dak Prescott	Mississippi State	Coleman Thomas	Tennessee	DeMarquis Gates	Ole Miss	Marquis Haynes	Ole Miss	Cyrus Jones; Taylor Bertolet	Alabama; Texas A&M	Mike Edwards	Kentucky

=== Week Thirteen ===
Date	Time	Visiting team	Home team	Site	Broadcast	Result	Attendance	Reference
November 27	2:30 p.m.	**Missouri**	**Arkansas**	Donald W. Reynolds Razorback Stadium • Fayetteville, Arkansas	CBS	**ARK** 28–3	65,228	
November 28	12:00 p.m.	**Georgia**	Georgia Tech	Bobby Dodd Stadium • Atlanta	ESPN2	**W** 13–7	55,000	
November 28	12:00 p.m.	Louisville	**Kentucky**	Commonwealth Stadium • Lexington, Kentucky	SECN	**L** 24–38	62,512	
November 28	12:00 p.m.	#1 Clemson	**South Carolina**	Williams-Brice Stadium • Columbia, South Carolina	ESPN	**L** 32–37	81,409	
November 28	3:30 p.m.	#2 **Alabama**	**Auburn**	Jordan–Hare Stadium • Auburn, Alabama	CBS	**ALA** 29–13	87,451	
November 28	4:00 p.m.	**Vanderbilt**	**Tennessee**	Neyland Stadium • Knoxville, Tennessee	SECN	**TENN** 53–28	98,327	
November 28	7:15 p.m.	#18 **Ole Miss**	#21 **Mississippi State**	Davis Wade Stadium • Starkville, Mississippi	ESPN2	**MISS** 38–27	62,265	
November 28	7:30 p.m.	#13 Florida State	#12 **Florida**	Ben Hill Griffin Stadium • Gainesville, Florida	ESPN	**L** 2–27	90,916	
November 28	7:30 p.m.	**Texas A&M**	**LSU**	Tiger Stadium • Baton Rouge, Louisiana	SECN	**LSU** 19–7	101,803	

Players of the week:

Offensive		Offensive lineman		Defensive		Co–Defensive lineman		Special teams		Freshman	
Player	Team	Player	Team	Player	Team	Player	Team	Player	Team	Player	Team
Derrick Henry	Alabama	Kyler Kerbyson	Tennessee	Deion Jones	LSU	Robert Nkemdiche; Deatrich Wise Jr.	Ole Miss; Arkansas	Adam Griffith	Alabama	Arden Key	LSU

=== SEC Championship Game ===
Date	Time	Visiting team	Home team	Site	Broadcast	Result	Attendance	Reference
December 5	4:00 p.m.	#18 **Florida**	#2 **Alabama**	Georgia Dome • Atlanta (2015 SEC Championship Game)	CBS	**ALA** 29–15	75,320	

== SEC vs other Conferences ==
=== SEC vs Power Conference matchups ===
This is a list of the power conference teams (ACC, Big Ten, Big 12, Pac-12)^{A} the SEC plays in non-conference (Rankings from the AP Poll):

Date	Visitor	Home	Site	Significance	Score
September 3	North Carolina	South Carolina	Bank of America Stadium • Charlotte, North Carolina	Battle of the Carolinas	W 17–13
September 5	#15 Arizona State	Texas A&M	NRG Stadium • Houston	Texas Kickoff	W 38–17
September 5	#20 Wisconsin	#3 Alabama	AT&T Stadium • Arlington, Texas	Cowboys Classic	W 35–17
September 5	Louisville	#6 Auburn	Georgia Dome • Atlanta	Chick-fil-A Kickoff Game	W 31–24
September 12	#19 Oklahoma	#23 Tennessee	Neyland Stadium • Knoxville, Tennessee		L 24–31 ^{2OT}
September 19	Texas Tech	Arkansas	Donald W. Reynolds Razorback Stadium • Fayetteville, Arkansas		L 24–35
September 26	#8 LSU	Syracuse	Carrier Dome • Syracuse, New York		W 34–24
November 14	BYU	Missouri	Arrowhead Stadium • Kansas City, Missouri		W 20–16
November 28	Georgia	Georgia Tech	Bobby Dodd Stadium • Atlanta	Clean, Old-Fashioned Hate	W 13–7
November 28	#1 Clemson	South Carolina	Williams-Brice Stadium • Columbia, South Carolina	Battle of the Palmetto State	L 32–37
November 28	#14 Florida State	#10 Florida	Ben Hill Griffin Stadium • Gainesville, Florida	Florida–Florida State football rivalry	L 2–27
November 28	Louisville	Kentucky	Commonwealth Stadium • Lexington, Kentucky	Governor's Cup	L 24–38

^A The SEC recognizes independents Army, BYU and Notre Dame as power five teams for scheduling purposes.

=== 2015 records against non-conference opponents ===
Regular Season

Power 5 Conferences	Record
ACC	4–3
Big Ten	1–0
Big 12	0–2
Independents	1–0
Pac-12	1–0
Power 5 Total	7–5
Other FBS Conferences	Record
American	3–2
C-USA	9–1
MAC	3–1
Mountain West	3–0
Sun Belt	9–0
Other FBS Total	27–4
FCS Opponents	Record
Football Championship Subdivision	11–1
Total Non-Conference Record	45–10

Post Season

Power 5 Conferences	Record
ACC	2–1
Big Ten	3–1
Big 12	3–0
Power 5 Total	8–2
Other FBS Conferences	Record
American	1–0
Other FBS Total	1–0
Total Bowl Record	9–2

== Bowl games ==
(Rankings from final CFP Poll; All times Eastern)

Date	Time	Bowl Game	Site	TV	SEC Team	Opponent	Result
January 11, 2016	8:30 p.m.	CFP National Championship	University of Phoenix Stadium • Glendale, Arizona	ESPN	#2 Alabama	#1 Clemson	W 45–40
January 2, 2016	3:20 p.m.	Liberty Bowl	Liberty Bowl • Memphis, Tennessee	ESPN	Arkansas	Kansas State	W 45–23
January 2, 2016	12:00 p.m.	TaxSlayer Bowl	EverBank Field • Jacksonville, Florida	ESPN	Georgia	Penn State	W 24–17
January 1, 2016	8:30 p.m.	Sugar Bowl (New Year's Six)	Mercedes-Benz Superdome • New Orleans	ESPN	#12 Ole Miss	#16 Oklahoma State	W 48–20
January 1, 2016	1:00 p.m.	Citrus Bowl	Citrus Bowl • Orlando, Florida	ABC	#19 Florida	#14 Michigan	L 7–41
January 1, 2016	12:00 p.m.	Outback Bowl	Raymond James Stadium • Tampa, Florida	ESPN2	#23 Tennessee	#13 Northwestern	W 45–6
December 31, 2015	8:00 p.m.	Cotton Bowl (CFP Seminfinal)	AT&T Stadium • Arlington, Texas	ESPN	#2 Alabama	#3 Michigan State	W 38–0
December 30, 2015	7:00 p.m.	Music City Bowl	LP Field • Nashville, Tennessee	ESPN	Texas A&M	Louisville	L 21–27
December 30, 2015	3:30 p.m.	Belk Bowl	Bank of America Stadium • Charlotte, North Carolina	ESPN	Mississippi State	NC State	W 51–28
December 30, 2015	12:00 p.m.	Birmingham Bowl	Legion Field • Birmingham, Alabama	ESPN	Auburn	Memphis	W 31–10
December 29, 2015	9:00 p.m.	Texas Bowl	NRG Stadium • Houston	ESPN	#20 LSU	Texas Tech	W 56–27

== Awards and honors ==
=== All-SEC Teams ===
The Southeastern Conference coaches voted for the All-SEC teams after the regular season concluded. The teams were released just after the Prior to the 2015 SEC Championship Game. Alabama placed ten representatives on the 2015 All-Southeastern Conference Coaches' Football Team, the most since Alabama and LSU placed 11 in 2011. Thirteen of the 14 SEC schools placed a member on the first-team All-SEC squad, while 12 institutions boasted at least two total All-SEC selections.

Coaches were not permitted to vote for their own players.

Position	1st Team		2nd Team	
Position	Player	School	Player	School
QB	Dak Prescott	Mississippi State	Chad Kelly	Ole Miss
RB	Derrick Henry	Alabama	Alex Collins	Arkansas
RB	Leonard Fournette	LSU	Jalen Hurd	Tennessee
WR	Laquon Treadwell	Ole Miss	Calvin Ridley	Alabama
WR	Fred Ross	Mississippi State	Christian Kirk	Texas A&M
TE	Hunter Henry	Arkansas	Evan Engram	Ole Miss
C	Ryan Kelly	Alabama	Ethan Pocic	LSU
OG	Sebastian Tretola	Arkansas	Dominick Jackson	Alabama
OG	Vadal Alexander	LSU	Shon Coleman	Auburn
OT	Cam Robinson	Alabama	Dan Skipper	Arkansas
OT	Dan Skipper	Georgia	Germain Ifedi	Texas A&M
AP	Pharoh Cooper	South Carolina	Christian Kirk	Texas A&M
DL	Myles Garrett	Texas A&M	Robert Nkemdiche	Ole Miss
DL	Jonathan Allen	Alabama	Marquis Haynes	Ole Miss
DL	Jonathan Bullard	Florida	Charles Harris	Missouri
DL	A'Shawn Robinson	Alabama	Derek Barnett	Tennessee
LB	Kentrell Brothers	Missouri	Leonard Floyd	Georgia
LB	Reggie Ragland	Alabama	Antonio Morrison	Florida
LB	Zach Cunningham	Vanderbilt	Skai Moore	South Carolina
DB	Vernon Hargreaves III	Florida	Mike Hilton	Ole Miss
DB	Eddie Jackson	Alabama	Dominick Sanders	Georgia
DB	Teez Tabor	Florida	Tre'Davious White	LSU
DB	Trae Elston	Ole Miss	Jamal Adams	LSU
PK	Daniel Carlson	Auburn	Taylor Bertolet	Texas A&M
P	Drew Kaser	Texas A&M	Johnny Townsend	Florida
RS	Evan Berry	Tennessee	Christian Kirk	Texas A&M

=== National Award Finalists ===
Winners in bold

- Heisman Trophy (player of the year) – **Derrick Henry, Alabama**
- Maxwell Award (player of the year) – **Derrick Henry, Alabama**
- Walter Camp Award (player of the year) – **Derrick Henry, Alabama**
- Bednarik Award (best defensive player) – Reggie Ragland, Alabama
- Fred Biletnikoff Award (wide receiver) – Laquon Treadwell, Ole Miss
- Bronko Nagurski Award (best defensive player) – Reggie Ragland, Alabama
- Butkus Award (best linebacker) – Leonard Floyd, Georgia; Deion Jones, LSU; Reggie Ragland, Alabama
- Doak Walker Award (best running back) – Leonard Fournette, LSU; **Derrick Henry, Alabama**
- Jim Thorpe Award (best defensive back) – Vernon Hargreaves III, Florida
- John Mackey Award (best tight end) – **Hunter Henry, Arkansas**
- Outland Trophy (best interior lineman) – A'Shawn Robinson, Alabama
- Dave Rimington Trophy (best center) – **Ryan Kelly, Alabama**
- Lombardi Award (best lineman/linebacker) – Myles Garrett, Texas A&M
- Lou Groza Award (best kicker) – Daniel Carlson, Auburn

=== All-Americans ===
- **HB** – Leonard Fournette, LSU (**AP**, **WCFF**, **FWAA**, CBS, ESPN)
- **HB** – Derrick Henry, Alabama (**AP**, **WCFF**, **FWAA**, **AFCA**, **TSN**, USAT, CBS, SI, ESPN, FOX, Athlon)
- **TE** – Hunter Henry, Arkansas (**AP**, **WCFF**, **TSN**, **AFCA**, USAT, ESPN, FOX, Athlon)
- **OL** – Ryan Kelly, Alabama (**WCFF**, **FWAA**, **AFCA**, **TSN**, USAT, ESPN, Athlon)
- **OL** – Sebastian Tretola, Arkansas (SI)
- **DL** – Jonathan Bullard, Florida (CBS)
- **DL** – Myles Garrett, Texas A&M (**WCFF**, **FWAA**)
- **DL** – A'Shawn Robinson, Alabama (**AP**, **FWAA**, **AFCA**, **TSN**, CBS, SI, FOX, Athlon)
- **LB** – Kentrell Brothers, Missouri (CBS, SI, FOX, Athlon)
- **LB** – Reggie Ragland, Alabama (**AP**, **WCFF**, **FWAA**, **AFCA**, **TSN**, USAT, CBS, SI, ESPN, Athlon)
- **DB** – Vernon Hargreaves, Florida (**AP**, **WCFF**, **FWAA**, **TSN**, **AFCA**, CBS)
- **DB** – Marcus Maye, Florida (USAT)
- **DB** – Jalen Mills, LSU (CBS)
- **P** – Drew Kaser, Texas A&M (CBS)
- **AP** – Evan Berry, Tennessee (**WCFF**, **TSN**, SI)
- **AP** – Antonio Callaway, Florida (CBS)
- **AP** – Christian Kirk, Texas A&M (Athlon)
- **AP** – Cameron Sutton, Tennessee (**TSN**)

== Home game attendance ==
Team	Stadium	Capacity	Game 1	Game 2	Game 3	Game 4	Game 5	Game 6	Game 7	Game 8	Total	Average	% of Capacity
Alabama	Bryant–Denny Stadium	101,821	98,568	101,821	101,323	101,821	101,821	101,821	100,611	–	707,786	101,112	99.30%
Arkansas	Razorback Stadium	72,000	67,708	49,591^{B}	73,334	72,008	64,206	71,936	65,228	–	464,011	69,070	95.45%
Auburn	Jordan–Hare Stadium	87,451	87,451	87,451	87,451	87,451	87,451	87,451	87,451	–	612,157	87,451	100%
Florida	Ben Hill Griffin Stadium	88,548	90,227	88,034	90,527	90,585	90,061	90,107	90,916	–	630,457	90,065	101.71%
Georgia	Sanford Stadium	92,746	92,746	92,746	92,746	92,746	92,746	92,746	92,746	–	649,222	92,746	100%
Kentucky	Commonwealth Stadium	61,000	62,933	63,040	58,008	63,380	63,407	60,886	56,195	62,512	490,361	61,295	100.48%
LSU	Tiger Stadium	102,321	102,321	102,321	102,321	101,561	101,699	101,803	–	–	612,026	102,004	99.69%
Mississippi State	Davis Wade	61,337	62,531	61,574	60,866	61,651	61,168	62,435	62,265	–	432,490	61,784	100.73%
Missouri	Faurot Field	71,168	64,670	70,079	66,751	70,767	58,878	59,575	–	–	390,720	65,120	91.50%
Ole Miss	Vaught–Hemingway	59,347	60,186	60,302	60,654	60,154	60,674	60,680	60,705	–	423,355	60,479	101.91%
South Carolina	Williams-Brice Stadium	80,250	82,178	78,411	42,058^{C}	75,159	78,536	77,241	81,409	–	472,934	78,822	98.22%
Tennessee	Neyland Stadium	102,455	102,455	102,136	101,265	102,455	101,253	96,197	98,327	–	704,088	100,584	98.17%
Texas A&M	Kyle Field	102,733	104,213	102,591	104,455	105,733	102,154	104,625	101,583	–	725,354	103,622	100.87%
Vanderbilt	Vanderbilt Stadium	40,550	30,307	37,185	31,399	31,128	30,301	32,482	–	–	192,802	32,134	79.25%

^BGame played at Arkansas' secondary home stadium War Memorial Stadium, capacity: 54,120.

^CGame relocated to LSU's Tiger Stadium due to severe flooding from the 2015 South Carolina Floods. Although the game was played in Baton Rouge, in all other aspects it was a home game for South Carolina. Note: The reported attendance is not factored into overall attendance for the season since it was unclear what the official capacity was for the game, and since it was not played at Williams–Brice Stadium.

Attendance for neutral site games:

- September 3 – South Carolina vs. North Carolina, Bank of America Stadium: 51,664
- September 5 – Texas A&M vs. Arizona State, NRG Stadium: 66,308
- September 5 – Tennessee vs. Bowling Green, LP Field: 61,323
- September 5 – Alabama vs. Wisconsin, AT&T Stadium: 64,279
- September 5 – Auburn vs. Louisville, Georgia Dome: 73,927
- September 26 – Arkansas vs. Texas A&M, AT&T Stadium: 67,339
- October 31 – Florida vs. Georgia, EverBank Field: 84,628
- November 14 – Missouri vs. BYU, Arrowhead Stadium: 42,824
