= 2015 All-America college football team =

Official list of the best college football players of 2015

The 2015 All-America college football team includes those players of American college football who have been honored by various selector organizations as the best players at their respective positions. The selector organizations award the "All-America" honor annually following the conclusion of the fall college football season. The original All-America team was the 1889 All-America college football team selected by Caspar Whitney. In 1950, the National Collegiate Athletic Bureau, which is the National Collegiate Athletic Association's (NCAA) service bureau, compiled the first list of All-Americans including first-team selections on teams created for a national audience that received national circulation with the intent of recognizing selections made from viewpoints that were nationwide. Since 1957, College Sports Information Directors of America (CoSIDA) has bestowed Academic All-American recognition on male and female athletes in Divisions I, II, and III of the NCAA as well as National Association of Intercollegiate Athletics athletes, covering all NCAA championship sports.

The 2015 All-America college football team is composed of the following All-America first teams chosen by the following selector organizations: Associated Press (AP), Football Writers Association of America (FWAA), American Football Coaches Association (AFCA), Walter Camp Foundation (WCFF), The Sporting News (TSN), Sports Illustrated (SI), USA Today (USAT) ESPN, CBS Sports (CBS), College Football News (CFN), Scout.com, and Yahoo! Sports (Yahoo!).

Currently, the NCAA compiles consensus all-America teams in the sports of Division I-FBS football and Division I men's basketball using a point system computed from All-America teams named by coaches associations or media sources. Players are chosen against other players playing at their position only. To be selected a consensus All-American, players must be chosen to the first team on at least two of the five official selectors as recognized by the NCAA. Second- and third-team honors are used to break ties. Players named first-team to all five selectors are deemed unanimous All-Americans. Currently, the NCAA recognizes All-Americans selected by the AP, AFCA, FWAA, TSN, and the WCFF to determine consensus and unanimous All-Americans.

In 2015, there were 26 consensus All-Americans, 12 of which were unanimous. Unanimous selections are listed with an asterisk.

2015 consensus All-Americans
Name	Position	Year	University
Deshaun Watson	Quarterback	Sophomore	Clemson
Leonard Fournette	Running back	Sophomore	LSU
Derrick Henry*	Running back	Junior	Alabama
Corey Coleman*	Wide receiver	Junior	Baylor
Josh Doctson*	Wide receiver	Senior	TCU
Hunter Henry*	Tight end	Junior	Arkansas
Taylor Decker	Offensive tackle	Senior	Ohio State
Spencer Drango*	Offensive tackle	Senior	Baylor
Ronnie Stanley	Offensive tackle	Senior	Notre Dame
Joshua Garnett*	Guard	Senior	Stanford
Ryan Kelly	Center	Senior	Alabama
Joey Bosa	Defensive end	Junior	Ohio State
Shaq Lawson	Defensive end	Junior	Clemson
Carl Nassib*	Defensive end	Senior	Penn St.
A'Shawn Robinson	Defensive tackle	Junior	Alabama
Reggie Ragland*	Linebacker	Senior	Alabama
Tyler Matakevich	Linebacker	Senior	Temple
Jaylon Smith	Linebacker	Junior	Notre Dame
Jeremy Cash*	Safety	Senior	Duke
Jalen Ramsey	Safety	Junior	Florida State
Vernon Hargreaves*	Cornerback	Junior	Florida
Desmond King*	Cornerback	Junior	Iowa
Kaʻimi Fairbairn	Kicker	Senior	UCLA
Tom Hackett*	Punter	Senior	Utah
Evan Berry	All-purpose	Sophomore	Tennessee
Christian McCaffrey	All-purpose	Sophomore	Stanford

== Offense ==
=== Quarterback ===
- Trevone Boykin, TCU (WCFF-2)
- Baker Mayfield, Oklahoma (AP-2, WCFF-1, TSN-1, SI)
- Keenan Reynolds, Navy (AP-3)
- Deshaun Watson, Clemson -- CONSENSUS -- (AP-1, FWAA, AFCA, TSN-2, WCFF-2, USAT, CBS, ESPN, Athlon)

=== Running back ===
- Dalvin Cook, Florida State (AP-2, FWAA, TSN-2, WCFF-2, SI, Athlon)
- Ezekiel Elliott, Ohio State (AP-2)
- Leonard Fournette, LSU -- CONSENSUS -- (AP-1, WCFF-1, FWAA, TSN-2, CBS, ESPN)
- Royce Freeman, Oregon (AP-3)
- Derrick Henry, Alabama -- UNANIMOUS -- (AP-1, WCFF-1, FWAA, AFCA, TSN-1, USAT, CBS, SI, ESPN, Athlon)
- Christian McCaffrey, Stanford (AFCA, TSN-1, WCFF-2, USAT)
- Larry Rose III, New Mexico State (AP-3)

=== Wide receiver ===
- Corey Coleman, Baylor -- UNANIMOUS -- (AP-1, WCFF-1, FWAA, TSN-1, AFCA, USAT, CBS, SI, ESPN, Athlon)
- Josh Doctson, TCU -- UNANIMOUS -- (AP-1, WCFF-1, FWAA, TSN-1, AFCA, USAT, CBS, SI, Athlon)
- Will Fuller, Notre Dame (AP-2, TSN-2)
- Roger Lewis, Bowling Green (AP-3)
- Tajae Sharpe, UMass (WCFF-2)
- Sterling Shepard, Oklahoma (ESPN)
- JuJu Smith-Schuster, Southern California (AP-2, TSN-2)
- Laquon Treadwell, Ole Miss (AP-3, WCFF-2)

=== Tight end ===
- Jake Butt, Michigan (AP-2, TSN-2, CBS, SI)
- Hunter Henry, Arkansas -- UNANIMOUS -- (AP-1, WCFF-1, TSN-1, AFCA, USAT, ESPN, Athlon)
- Austin Hooper, Stanford (AP-3)
- Jordan Leggett, Clemson (WCFF-2)

=== Offensive line ===
- Vadal Alexander, LSU (AP-3, TSN-2, WCFF-2)
- Jack Allen, Michigan State (AP-1, WCFF-2, CBS, SI)
- Austin Blythe, Iowa (AP-3)
- Jack Conklin, Michigan State (AP-2, TSN-1, WCFF-2, USAT, Athlon)
- Taylor Decker, Ohio State -- CONSENSUS -- (AP-1, WCFF-1, AFCA, TSN-2, CBS, SI)
- Spencer Drango, Baylor -- UNANIMOUS -- (AP-1, WCFF-1, FWAA, TSN-1, AFCA, USAT, CBS, SI, ESPN, Athlon)
- Pat Elflein, Ohio State (AP-2)
- Dan Feeney, Indiana (AP-3, ESPN)
- Joshua Garnett, Stanford -- UNANIMOUS -- (AP-1, WCFF-1, FWAA, AFCA, TSN-1, USAT, CBS, SI, ESPN, Athlon)
- Roderick Johnson, Florida State (TSN-2)
- Ryan Kelly, Alabama -- CONSENSUS -- (AP-2, WCFF-1, FWAA, AFCA, TSN-1, USAT, ESPN, Athlon)
- Jason Spriggs, Indiana (AP-3, FWAA, TSN-2, WCFF-2)
- Ronnie Stanley, Notre Dame -- CONSENSUS -- (AP-2, WCFF-1, FWAA, TSN-1, AFCA, CBS, ESPN)
- Joe Thuney, North Carolina State (AP-3, USAT)
- Sebastian Tretola, Arkansas (AP-2, TSN-2, SI)
- Laremy Tunsil, Ole Miss (WCFF-2)
- Landon Turner, North Carolina (AP-1, Athlon)

== Defense ==
=== Defensive line ===
- Andrew Billings, Baylor (AP-1, TSN-2, ESPN, Athlon)
- Joey Bosa, Ohio State -- CONSENSUS -- (AP-2, WCFF-1, AFCA, TSN-2, USAT, CBS, SI, ESPN, Athlon)
- DeForest Buckner, Oregon (AP-2, USAT)
- Jonathan Bullard, Florida (AP-3, TSN-2, CBS)
- Shilique Calhoun, Michigan State (AP-3, WCFF-2)
- Kenny Clark, UCLA (AP-3)
- Sheldon Day, Notre Dame (AP-2, USAT)
- Myles Garrett, Texas A&M (AP-3, WCFF-1, FWAA)
- Shaq Lawson, Clemson -- CONSENSUS -- (AP-1, WCFF-1, FWAA, AFCA, TSN-2, USAT, ESPN)
- Carl Nassib, Penn State -- UNANIMOUS -- (AP-1, WCFF-1, FWAA, TSN-1, AFCA, CBS, SI, ESPN, Athlon)
- Robert Nkemdiche, Ole Miss (AP-3, WCFF-2)
- Emmanuel Ogbah, Oklahoma State (TSN-1, WCFF-2)
- A'Shawn Robinson, Alabama -- CONSENSUS -- (AP-1, FWAA, AFCA, TSN-1, WCFF-2, CBS, SI, Athlon)
- Adolphus Washington, Ohio State (TSN-1)

=== Linebacker ===
- Kentrell Brothers, Missouri (AP-2, TSN-2, WCFF-2, CBS, SI, Athlon)
- Su'a Cravens, Southern California (AP-3)
- Tyler Matakevich, Temple -- CONSENSUS -- (AP-1, WCFF-1, FWAA, AFCA, TSN-2, USAT, ESPN)
- Blake Martinez, Stanford (AP-3)
- Raekwon McMillan, Ohio State (WCFF-2)
- Reggie Ragland, Alabama -- UNANIMOUS -- (AP-1, WCFF-1, FWAA, AFCA, TSN-1, USAT, CBS, SI, ESPN, Athlon)
- Joe Schobert, Wisconsin (AP-3, FWAA, TSN-2, WCFF-2, ESPN)
- Jaylon Smith, Notre Dame -- CONSENSUS -- (AP-1, WCFF-1, TSN-1, AFCA, USAT, CBS, SI, Athlon)
- Eric Striker, Oklahoma (AP-2, TSN-1, SI)
- Anthony Walker, Northwestern (AP-3)

=== Defensive back ===
- Mackensie Alexander, Clemson (AP-3)
- Vonn Bell, Ohio State (AP-1, TSN-1, SI, Athlon)
- Jeremy Cash, Duke -- UNANIMOUS -- (AP-1, WCFF-1, FWAA, TSN-1, AFCA, USAT, CBS, SI, ESPN, Athlon)
- Trae Elston, Ole Miss (AP-2)
- Vernon Hargreaves, Florida -- UNANIMOUS -- (AP-1, WCFF-1, FWAA, TSN-1, AFCA, CBS)
- Eddie Jackson, Alabama (AP-3, WCFF-2)
- Jayron Kearse, Clemson (AP-2, ESPN)
- Desmond King, Iowa -- UNANIMOUS -- (AP-1, WCFF-1, FWAA, TSN-1, AFCA, USAT, CBS, SI, ESPN, Athlon)
- Jourdan Lewis, Michigan (AP-2, WCFF-2, USAT, SI)
- Shawun Lurry, Northern Illinois (AP-3, FWAA, WCFF-2)
- Marcus Maye, Florida (USAT)
- Jalen Mills, LSU (CBS)
- Jabrill Peppers, Michigan (TSN-2)
- Jalen Ramsey, Florida State -- CONSENSUS -- (AP-2, WCFF-1, AFCA, TSN-2, ESPN, Athlon)
- Zack Sanchez, Oklahoma (TSN-2, WCFF-2)
- Teez Tabor, Florida (TSN-2)
- Darian Thompson, Boise State (AP-3)

== Special teams ==
=== Kicker ===
- Roberto Aguayo, Florida State (TSN-1, CBS)
- Daniel Carlson, Auburn (WCFF-2)
- Jake Elliott, Memphis (AP-2, USAT, WCFF-2, ESPN)
- Kaʻimi Fairbairn, UCLA -- CONSENSUS -- (AP-1, WCFF-1, FWAA, AFCA, TSN-2, SI, Athlon)
- Aidan Schneider, Oregon (AP-3)

=== Punter ===
- Michael Carrizosa, San Jose State (WCFF-2)
- Tom Hackett, Utah -- UNANIMOUS -- (AP-1, WCFF-1, FWAA, TSN-1, AFCA, USAT, SI, ESPN, Athlon)
- Drew Kaser, Texas A&M (AP-2, TSN-2, CBS)
- Hayden Hunt, Colorado State (AP-3)

=== All-purpose / return specialist ===
- Evan Berry, Tennessee -- CONSENSUS -- (WCFF-1, TSN-1, SI)
- Morgan Burns, Kansas State (AP-2, TSN-2, USAT, CBS, Athlon)
- Antonio Callaway, Florida (CBS)
- Jakeem Grant, Texas Tech (AP-3)
- Christian Kirk, Texas A&M (Athlon)
- William Likely, Maryland (FWAA)
- Christian McCaffrey, Stanford -- CONSENSUS -- (AP-1, FWAA, WCFF-2, CBS, SI, ESPN)
- Dante Pettis, Washington (TSN-2)
- Cameron Sutton, Tennessee (TSN-1)
- Ryan Switzer, North Carolina (AFCA)

== See also ==
- 2015 All-SEC football team
- 2015 All-Big Ten Conference football team
- 2015 All-Big 12 Conference football team
- 2015 All-Pac-12 Conference football team
