= 2015 All-SEC football team =

American college football all-star team

The 2015 All-SEC football team consists of American football players selected to the All-Southeastern Conference (SEC) chosen by the Associated Press (AP) and the conference coaches for the 2015 Southeastern Conference football season.

The Alabama Crimson Tide won the conference, beating the Florida Gators 29 to 15 in the SEC Championship.

Alabama running back and Heisman Trophy recipient Derrick Henry was unanimously voted the AP SEC Offensive Player of the Year. Alabama linebacker Reggie Ragland was voted the AP SEC Defensive Player of the Year.

== Offensive selections ==
=== Quarterbacks ===
- Dak Prescott, Miss. St. (AP-1, Coaches-1, ESPN)
- Chad Kelly, Ole Miss (AP-2, Coaches-2)

=== Running backs ===
- Derrick Henry*, Alabama (AP-1, Coaches-1, ESPN)
- Leonard Fournette*, LSU (AP-1, Coaches-1, ESPN)
- Alex Collins, Arkansas (AP-2, Coaches-2)
- Jalen Hurd, Tennessee (AP-2, Coaches-2)

=== Wide receivers ===
- Laquon Treadwell, Ole Miss (AP-1, Coaches-1, ESPN)
- Pharoh Cooper, South Carolina (AP-1, Coaches-1, ESPN)
- Fred Ross, Miss. St. (AP-2, Coaches-1)
- Calvin Ridley, Alabama (AP-2, Coaches-2)
- Drew Morgan, Arkansas (AP-2)
- Christian Kirk, Texas A&M (Coaches-2)
- De'Runnya Wilson, Miss. St. (Coaches-2)

=== Centers ===
- Ryan Kelly, Alabama (AP-1, Coaches-1, ESPN)
- Brandon Kublanow, Georgia (AP-2)
- Ethan Pocic, LSU (Coaches-2)

=== Guards ===
- Sebastian Tretola, Arkansas (AP-1, Coaches-1, ESPN)
- Vadal Alexander, LSU (AP-1, Coaches-1)
- Dylan Wiesman, Tennessee (AP-2)
- Braden Smith, Auburn (AP-2)

=== Tackles ===
- Cam Robinson, Alabama (AP-1, Coaches-1)
- John Theus, Georgia (AP-1, Coaches-1)
- Dan Skipper, Arkansas (AP-2, Coaches-2, ESPN)
- Kyler Kerbyson, Tennessee (AP-2, ESPN)
- Laremy Tunsil, Ole Miss (ESPN)
- Shon Coleman, Auburn (Coaches-2)
- Germain Ifedi, Texas A&M (Coaches-2)
- Dominick Jackson, Alabama (Coaches-2)

=== Tight ends ===
- Hunter Henry, Arkansas (AP-1, Coaches-1, ESPN)
- Jake McGee, Florida (AP-2)
- Evan Engram, Ole Miss (Coaches-2)

== Defensive selections ==
=== Defensive ends ===
- Myles Garrett, Texas A&M (AP-1, Coaches-1, ESPN)
- Jonathan Bullard, Florida (AP-1, Coaches-1, ESPN)
- Jonathan Allen, Alabama (AP-1, Coaches-1)
- Derek Barnett, Tennessee (AP-2, Coaches-2)
- Marquis Haynes, Ole Miss (AP-2, Coaches-2)
- Charles Harris, Missouri (AP-2, Coaches-2)
- Cory Johnson, Kentucky (AP-2)

=== Defensive tackles ===
- A'Shawn Robinson, Alabama (AP-1, Coaches-1)
- Robert Nkemdiche, Ole Miss (AP-2, Coaches-2, ESPN)
- Jarran Reed, Alabama (AP-2, ESPN)

=== Linebackers ===
- Reggie Ragland, Alabama (AP-1, Coaches-1, ESPN)
- Kentrell Brothers, Missouri (AP-1, Coaches-1, ESPN)
- Zach Cunningham, Vanderbilt (AP-1, Coaches-1, ESPN)
- Antonio Morrison, Florida (AP-2, Coaches-2)
- Skai Moore, South Carolina (AP-2, Coaches-2)
- Jalen Reeves-Maybin, Tennessee (AP-2)
- Leonard Floyd, Georgia (Coaches-2)

=== Cornerbacks ===
- Vernon Hargreaves*, Florida (AP-1, Coaches-1, ESPN)
- Teez Tabor, Florida (AP-1, Coaches-1, ESPN)
- Tre'Davious White, LSU (AP-2, Coaches-2)
- Mike Hilton, Ole Miss (AP-2, Coaches-2)

=== Safeties ===
- Eddie Jackson, Alabama (AP-1, Coaches-1, ESPN)
- Dominick Sanders, Georgia (AP-1, Coaches-2)
- Trae Elston, Ole Miss (AP-2, Coaches-1, ESPN)
- Jamal Adams, LSU (AP-2, Coaches-2)

== Special teams ==
=== Kickers ===
- Daniel Carlson*, Auburn (AP-1, Coaches-1, ESPN)
- Taylor Bertolet, Texas A&M (AP-2, Coaches-2)
- Adam Griffith, Alabama (Coaches-2)

=== Punters ===
- Drew Kaser, Texas A&M (AP-1, Coaches-1)
- Johnny Townsend, Florida (AP-2, Coaches-2, ESPN)

=== All purpose/return specialist ===
- Christian Kirk, Texas A&M (AP-1, Coaches-2, ESPN)
- Evan Berry, Tennessee (AP-2, Coaches-1, ESPN)
- Pharoh Cooper, South Carolina (AP-2, Coaches-1)

== Key ==
Bold = Consensus first-team selection by both the coaches and AP

AP = Associated Press

Coaches = Selected by the SEC coaches

ESPN = selected by ESPN.com

* = Unanimous selection of AP

== See also ==
- 2015 Southeastern Conference football season
- 2015 College Football All-America Team
