= Denzel Nkemdiche =

American football player (born 1993)

Profile
- Position: Linebacker

Personal information
- Born: February 15, 1993 (age 33); Atlanta, Georgia
- Listed height: 5 ft 11 in (1.80 m)
- Listed weight: 190 lb (86 kg)

Career information
- High school: Grayson (Loganville, Georgia)
- College: University of Mississippi (2011–2015)

Awards and highlights
- Second-team All-SEC (2013); Freshman All-American (2012)
- Stats at ESPN

Denzel-Ray N. Nkemdiche (born February 15, 1993) is an American former college football linebacker. He played for the University of Mississippi.

== Early life ==
A native of Loganville, Georgia, Nkemdiche attended Grayson High School, where he played for the Grayson High School Rams football team. As a senior, he helped lead the team to a 10–4 record by recording 101 tackles, 18 tackles for loss, eight sacks, and three interception returns for touchdowns. He was projected to move to the secondary in college, but lacked elite speed, which is why he was only rated as a two-star recruit and not ranked among the nation's top prospects.

== College career ==
Nkemdiche chose to attend Ole Miss over Georgia, and redshirted his first year in Oxford, Mississippi. In the 2012 season, he led the team with 82 tackles, 13 tackles for loss, four forced fumbles, and three interceptions. He was named second-team All-SEC by the Associated Press and to the SEC All-Freshman team. On October 25, 2014, Nkemdiche broke his ankle against LSU. During the 2015 season, he was released from the football team.

== Personal life ==
Nkemdiche was born in Atlanta, Georgia to Nigerian immigrants Beverly and Sunday Nkemdiche. His father, a cardiologist, has reportedly applied for a researcher position at University of Mississippi Medical Center in Jackson, Mississippi. Nkemdiche's mother, a politician, returned to Nigeria in 2009 and currently represents Onitsha South in the Anambra State House of Assembly. His younger brother, Robert Nkemdiche, played in the National Football League.
