= Ryan Kelly (American football) =

American football player (born 1993)

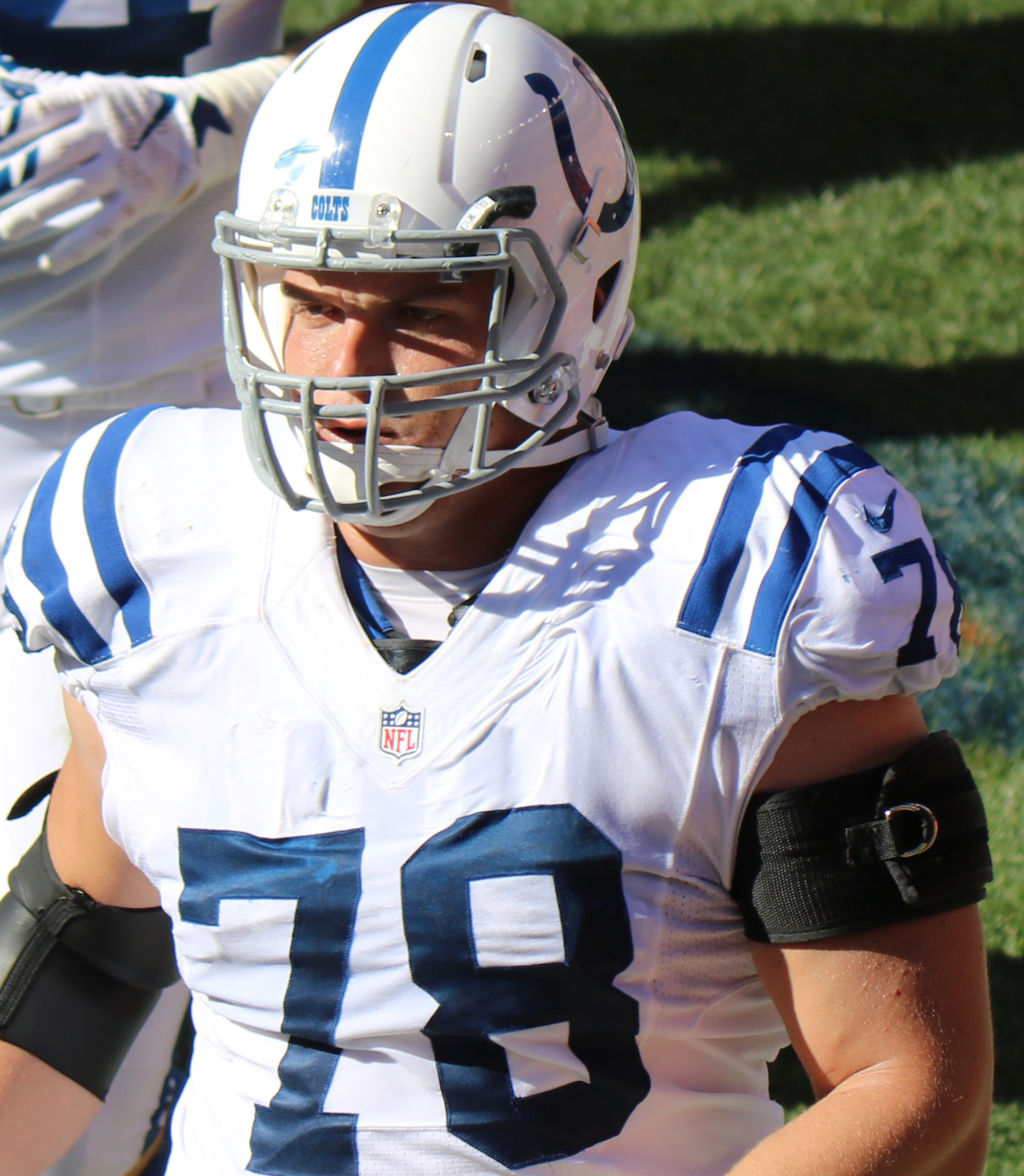
- Kelly with the Indianapolis Colts in 2016

No. 78
- Position: Center

Personal information
- Born: May 30, 1993 (age 33); West Chester, Ohio, U.S.
- Listed height: 6 ft 4 in (1.93 m)
- Listed weight: 307 lb (139 kg)

Career information
- High school: Lakota West (West Chester)
- College: Alabama (2011–2015)
- NFL draft: 2016: 1st round, 18th overall pick

Career history
- Indianapolis Colts (2016–2024); Minnesota Vikings (2025)

Awards and highlights
- Second-team All-Pro (2020); 4× Pro Bowl (2019–2021, 2023); 2× BCS national champion (2011, 2012); CFP national champion (2015); Rimington Trophy (2015); Consensus All-American (2015); Jacobs Blocking Trophy (2015) (Note: Co-winner with Sebastian Tretola); First-team All-SEC (2015)

Career NFL statistics
- Games played: 129
- Games started: 129
- Fumble recoveries: 1
- Stats at Pro Football Reference

Ryan Patrick Kelly (born May 30, 1993) is an American former professional football player who was a center for 10 seasons in the National Football League (NFL). He played college football for the Alabama Crimson Tide, and was selected by the Indianapolis Colts in the first round of the 2016 NFL draft. He also played for the Minnesota Vikings.

== Early life ==
Kelly attended Lakota West High School in West Chester, Ohio, where he was teammates with Jordan Hicks. As a junior in 2009, he was a first team all-conference and all-city selection on the offensive line. During his senior season, he suffered a torn anterior cruciate ligament (ACL) in the last game of his season against rival Lakota East, yet he still was named third-team Division I All-Ohio. Although selected, he was unable to play at the Under Armour All-America Game coming off of his knee injury.

Rated as a three-star recruit by ESPN, Kelly was ranked as the No. 4 center prospect in his class. He collected numerous scholarship offers from major programs, including Alabama, Florida, Florida State, Michigan, and Tennessee, but none from his home-state Ohio State Buckeyes who signed the third-ranked center, Brian Bobek from Palatine, Illinois, instead. Kelly verbally committed to Alabama in July 2010.

== College career ==
After redshirting his initial year in Tuscaloosa, Kelly came off the bench to play in 10 games of the 2012 season at center, backing up All-American senior Barrett Jones. Kelly was named to the Southeastern Conference (SEC) All-Freshman team, alongside Amari Cooper and T. J. Yeldon. In his sophomore year, Kelly took over starting duties from Jones, making the calls on an offensive line that ranked 23rd nationally and fourth in the SEC for fewest sacks allowed per game (1.31).

As a junior, Kelly was named to the Rimington Trophy watch list and started 12 games at center. A highly reliable anchor on the offensive line, he missed just seven assignments in 806 snaps on the year for a 99.1 percent success rate and did not allow a quarterback sack. After wins at Tennessee and against Western Carolina he was named Alabama's Offensive Player of the Week. In his senior season, Kelly missed only eight assignments in 1,012 snaps for a success rate of 99.2 percent on the season, and committed just one penalty in 1,012 snaps with no holding calls. He was a consensus first team All-America selection, earning first-team honors from the Walter Camp Football Foundation, USA Today, Sporting News, the Football Writers Association of America, and the American Football Coaches Association, and won the Rimington Trophy in 2015.

== Professional career ==
Pre-draft measurables
Height	Weight	Arm length	Hand span	Wingspan	40-yard dash	10-yard split	20-yard split	20-yard shuttle	Three-cone drill	Vertical jump	Broad jump	Bench press
6 ft 4 in (1.93 m)	311 lb (141 kg)	33 5/8 in (0.85 m)	9 5/8 in (0.24 m)	6 ft 8 5/8 in (2.05 m)	5.03 s	1.78 s	2.93 s	4.59 s	7.58 s	30.0 in (0.76 m)	8 ft 7 in (2.62 m)	26 reps
All values from NFL Combine

=== Indianapolis Colts ===
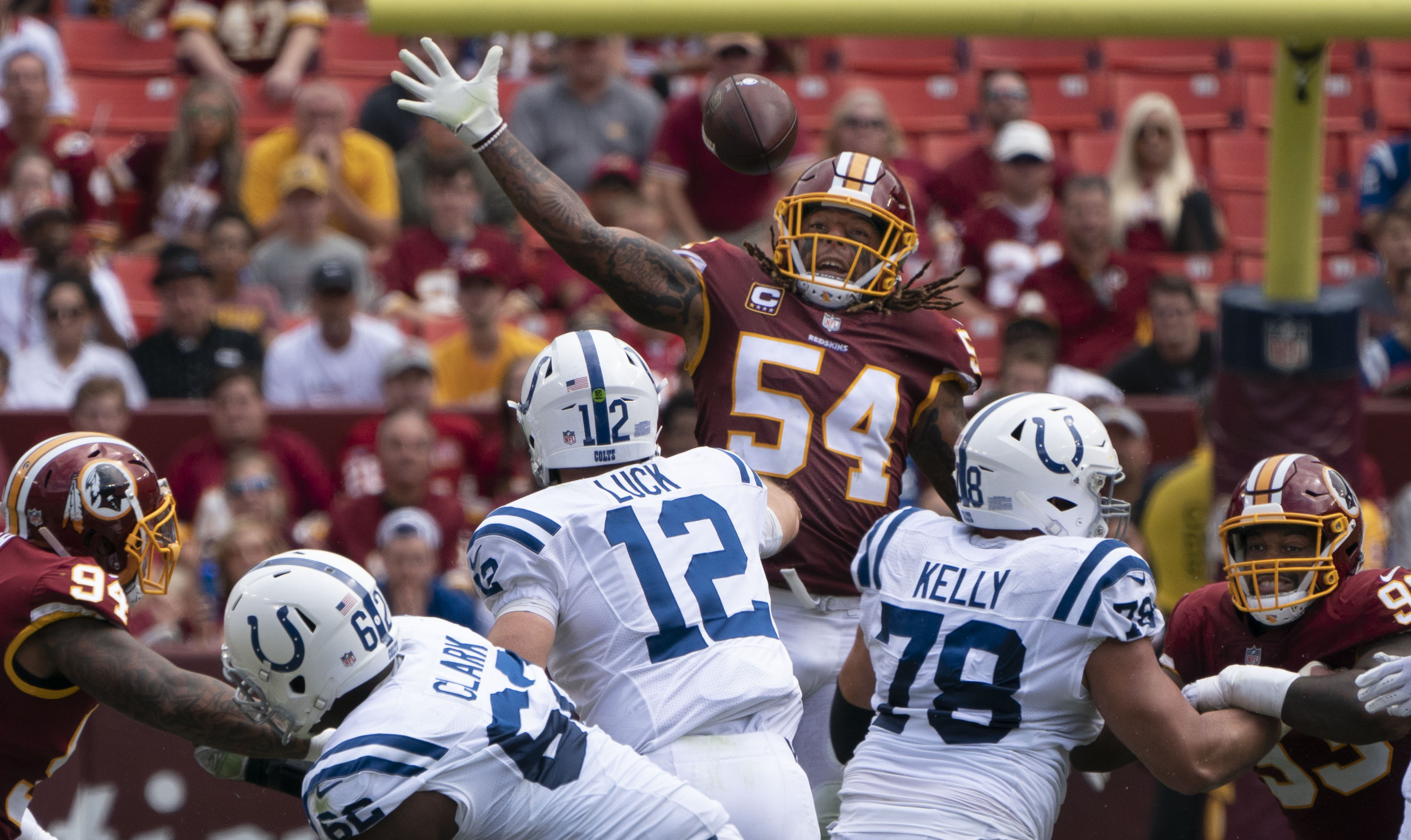
Kelly (right) in a game against the Washington Redskins in 2018.

The Indianapolis Colts selected Kelly in the first round (18th overall) of the 2016 NFL draft. The Colts drafted him with the expectation of him becoming "the first solid center for the franchise since Jeff Saturday." He was Alabama's first interior offensive lineman selected in the first round since Chance Warmack in 2013.

On May 4, 2016, the Colts signed Kelly to a fully guaranteed four-year, $10.45 million contract that includes a signing bonus of $5.80 million. He started all 16 games at center during his rookie year.

On August 17, 2017, it was revealed that Kelly would undergo foot surgery for a broken bone he suffered during practice. He missed the first four weeks of the season, and went on to start the next seven games. He suffered a concussion in Week 12 and missed the next three games before being placed on injured reserve on December 18, 2017.

On April 27, 2019, the Colts picked up the fifth-year option on Kelly's contract.

On September 4, 2020, the Colts signed Kelly to a four-year, $50 million extension, making him the highest paid center in the NFL.

=== Minnesota Vikings ===
On March 12, 2025, Kelly signed with the Minnesota Vikings on a two-year, $18 million contract. The Vikings followed Kelly's acquisition by also signing his Colts offensive line teammate Will Fries. On October 4, Kelly was placed on injured reserve after suffering his second concussion of the season. He was activated on November 22, ahead of the team's Week 12 matchup against the Green Bay Packers. On December 24, Kelly was placed on season-ending injured reserve after suffering his third concussion of the year, despite wearing a guardian cap.

On March 6, 2026, Kelly announced his retirement from professional football on his personal X account.

=== Statistics ===
Year	Team	Games	Starts
2016	IND	16	16
2017	IND	7	7
2018	IND	12	12
2019	IND	16	16
2020	IND	15	15
2021	IND	14	14
2022	IND	17	17
2023	IND	14	14
2024	IND	10	10
2025	MIN	8	8
Career		129	129

== Personal life ==
On December 17, 2021, Kelly and his wife Emma lost their newborn daughter to heart failure.
