= Reggie Ragland =

American football player (born 1993)

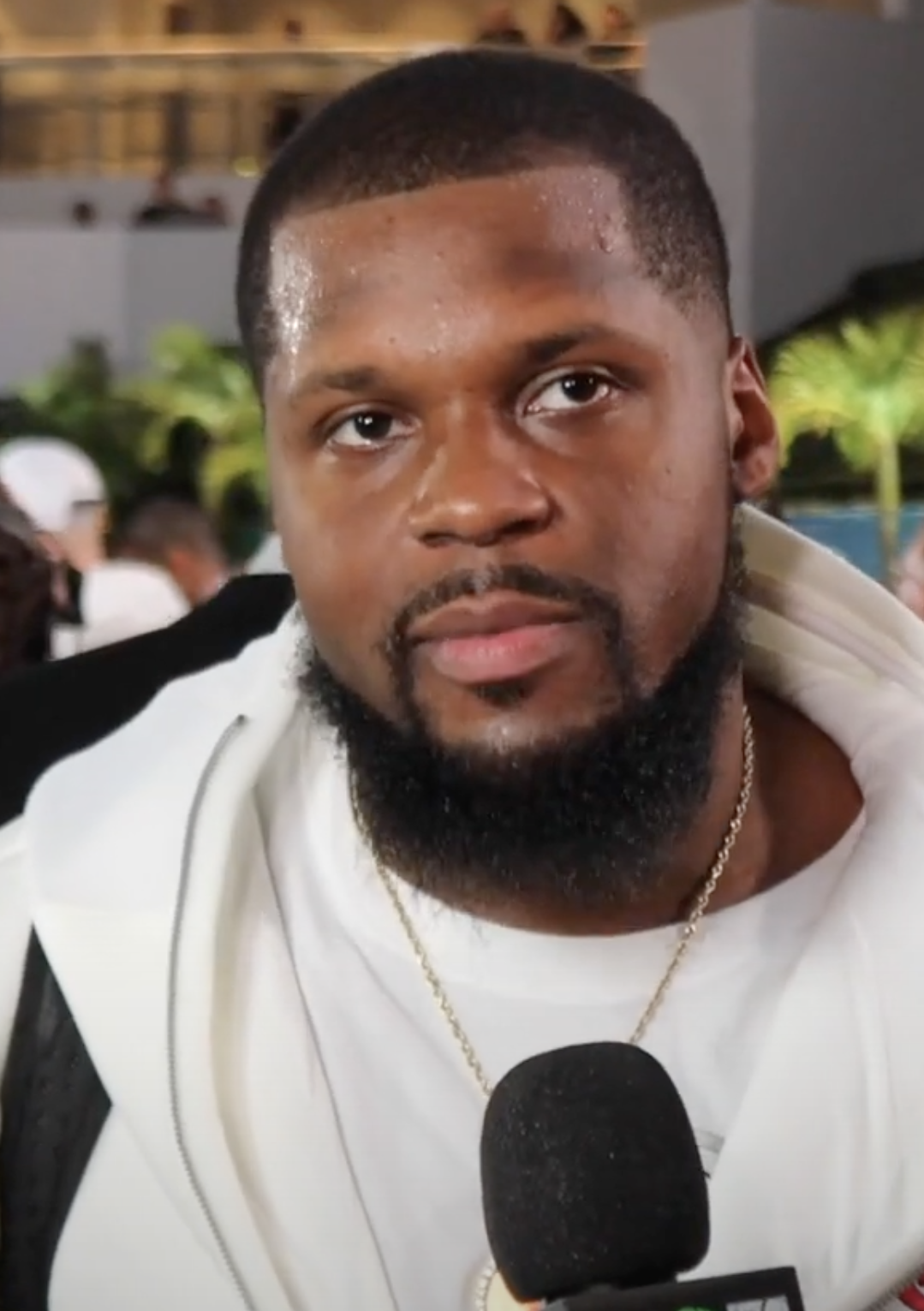
- Ragland in 2020

No. 59, 55, 19
- Position: Linebacker

Personal information
- Born: September 23, 1993 (age 33); Huntsville, Alabama, U.S.
- Listed height: 6 ft 2 in (1.88 m)
- Listed weight: 252 lb (114 kg)

Career information
- High school: Bob Jones (Madison, Alabama)
- College: Alabama (2012–2015)
- NFL draft: 2016: 2nd round, 41st overall pick

Career history
- Buffalo Bills (2016); Kansas City Chiefs (2017–2019); Detroit Lions (2020); New York Giants (2021); Las Vegas Raiders (2022)*; Cleveland Browns (2022)
- * Offseason or practice squad member only

Awards and highlights
- Super Bowl champion (LIV); CFP national champion (2015); BCS national champion (2012); SEC Defensive Player of the Year (2015); Unanimous All-American (2015); 2× First-team All-SEC (2014, 2015)

Career NFL statistics
- Total tackles: 293
- Sacks: 3.5
- Forced fumbles: 2
- Fumble recoveries: 2
- Interceptions: 1
- Pass deflections: 4
- Stats at Pro Football Reference

Reggie Keith Ragland Jr. (born September 23, 1993) is an American former professional football player who was a linebacker in the National Football League (NFL). He played college football for the Alabama Crimson Tide, winning two national championships. He was then selected by the Buffalo Bills in the second round of the 2016 NFL draft. In 2016, he missed his rookie season after being placed on injured reserve with a torn ACL. During the 2017 season, he was traded to the Kansas City Chiefs for a fourth-round pick in the 2019 draft. On January 6, 2018, Ragland started his first career playoff game, registering nine tackles during the team's 22–21 loss to the Tennessee Titans. Two years later he won his first Super Bowl, recording two tackles when the Chiefs defeated the San Francisco 49ers.

== Early life ==
A native of Huntsville, Alabama, Ragland started his high school career as an 8th grader, playing football at Grissom High School. Ragland's family relocated to Madison, Alabama, Ragland attended Bob Jones High School, where he was a varsity player in both football and basketball. As a sophomore, he played small forward on a basketball team that upset No. 1 Homewood to win the 2009–2010 AHSAA Class 6A Championship, with Levi Randolph being named MVP. Meanwhile, on the football field Ragland had 40 receptions as a tight end and six touchdowns. Mostly playing defense as a junior, he recorded 91 tackles in 2010 with 21 tackles-for-loss. Bob Jones went 8–4 over the season, losing 21–28 to Clay-Chalkville in the first round of the 6A playoffs. In his senior season, Ragland was credited with 97 tackles with 22 tackles-for-loss and six sacks. The Patriots allowed only 13 points per game and were 10–2 on the season, losing to the eventual 6A state runner-up Hoover in the second round of the playoffs. Ragland was also on the Patriots track & field team, where he competed in the discus throw and the shot put.

Regarded as a four-star recruit by Rivals.com, Ragland was listed as the No. 1 inside linebacker prospect in his class. Shortly after his junior season, he committed to Alabama over Auburn, Florida, and Tennessee.

== College career ==
As a true freshman on Alabama's 2012 championship team, Ragland played in 10 games, primarily on special teams, and was credited with eight tackles, include five solo stops, and a forced fumble. In his sophomore season, he appeared in 13 games, and compiled 17 tackles on the season as a back-up to C. J. Mosley. Both he and Reuben Foster were the leading candidates to replace Mosley at the “Will” linebacker spot in Alabama's 3–4 defense. Ragland eventually won out over Foster, starting all but one game for the Crimson Tide in 2014. He recorded 95 tackles on the season, which ranked second on the team behind only Landon Collins. Ragland also had 10.5 tackles for loss, 1.5 sacks, and a team-high three fumble recoveries. He was named Southeastern Conference Defensive Player of the Week after a career-high 13 tackles against Louisiana State.

=== College statistics ===
Year	GP	TSolo	TAsst	TOT	TFL	TFLYDS	SCK	INT	INTYDS	TD	FF	FR	TD
2013	13	6	11	17	0.5	1	0	0	0	0	0	0	0
2014	14	46	47	93	10.5	27	1.5	1	1	0	1	0	0
Total	27	52	58	110	9.0	28	1.5	1	1	0	1	0	0

== Professional career ==
=== Pre-draft ===
On January 21, 2016, it was announced that Ragland had accepted his invitation to play in the 2016 Senior Bowl. He impressed many scouts and analysts and was named one of the top performers during Senior Bowl practices. On January 26, 2016, he played outside linebacker for Jacksonville Jaguars head coach Gus Bradley's South team that defeated the North 27–16. He was one of 38 collegiate linebackers that attended the NFL Scouting Combine in Indianapolis, Indiana. He completed the majority of drills, finishing fifth in the short shuttle and 14th in the 40-yard dash. Prior to the draft, however, medical exams revealed Ragland having an enlarged aorta. Although reports stated this would not affect his football career, several teams had lowered Ragland on their draft boards as a result. At the conclusion of the pre-draft process, Ragland was projected to be a first-round pick by NFL draft experts and scouts. He was ranked the top inside linebacker prospect in the draft by NFLDraftScout.com, the second best linebacker by NFL analyst Mike Mayock, and was ranked the third best linebacker in the draft by Sports Illustrated and NFL analyst Charles Davis.

Pre-draft measurables
Height	Weight	Arm length	Hand span	Wingspan	40-yard dash	10-yard split	20-yard split	20-yard shuttle	Vertical jump	Broad jump
6 ft 1 1/4 in (1.86 m)	247 lb (112 kg)	32 in (0.81 m)	9 7/8 in (0.25 m)	6 ft 5 3/4 in (1.97 m)	4.72 s	1.65 s	2.75 s	4.28 s	31.5 in (0.80 m)	9 ft 8 in (2.95 m)
All values from NFL Combine

=== Buffalo Bills ===
==== 2016 season ====
The Buffalo Bills selected Ragland in the second round (41st overall) of the 2016 NFL draft. The Bills traded their second-round pick (49th overall), a fourth-round pick (117th overall), and their fourth-round pick in the 2017 NFL draft to the Chicago Bears for the 41st overall pick to draft him.

On May 24, 2016, the Bills signed Ragland to a four-year, $5.84 million contract that includes $3.16 million guaranteed and a signing bonus of $2.44 million. Ragland and Preston Brown entered training camp slated as the starting inside linebackers for the Bills. On August 5, 2016, Ragland suffered an injury to the left knee during training camp.

On August 30, 2016, Ragland was officially placed on injured reserve after it was discovered to be a torn ACL. He missed the entire rookie season due to the injury.

==== 2017 season ====
Ragland entered training camp and competed against Preston Brown for the starting middle linebacker role in new defensive coordinator Leslie Frazier's 4–3 defense. On August 8, 2017, Ragland was demoted to the third team defense behind Brown and Tanner Vallejo.

=== Kansas City Chiefs ===
==== 2017 season ====
On August 28, 2017, Ragland was traded to the Kansas City Chiefs for a fourth round draft pick in the 2019 NFL draft. The Bills had placed Ragland on the trade bloc for the majority of the summer as it was believed that he would not be an ideal fit for Bills' head coach Sean McDermott's base 4–3 defense. He was one of multiple players traded by the Bills after the arrival of new executives.

Head coach Andy Reid named Ragland the backup inside linebacker behind Ramik Wilson to start the regular season. Ragland was inactive for the first three games while he became familiar with the defense. On October 2, 2017, Ragland made his NFL debut and first career start in a 29–20 victory against the Washington Redskins. He made his first career tackle with teammate Frank Zombo, as they both tackled Robert Kelley to stop a three-yard run. Head coach Andy Reid stated that Ragland was started over a healthy Ramik Wilson so they could see what he had to offer. He remained the starting inside linebacker, opposite Derrick Johnson, for the remainder of the season. On November 19, 2017, Ragland made a season-high nine combined tackles in a 12–9 loss at the New York Giants. The following week, he tied his season-high of nine combined tackles during a 16–10 loss against his former team, the Bills. Ragland was a healthy scratch for the Chiefs' Week 17 matchup at the Denver Broncos and finished the 2017 season with 44 combined tackles (31 solo) in 12 games and ten starts.

The Chiefs finished the 2017 season atop the American Football Conference (AFC) West with a 10–6 record and received a playoff berth. On January 6, 2018, Ragland started his first career playoff game and collected nine combined tackles in a 22–21 loss to the Tennessee Titans.

==== 2018 season ====
In 2018, Ragland played in 16 games with 15 starts, finishing second on the team with 86 combined tackles, a half sack, and an interception.

==== 2019 season ====
In week 7 of the 2019 season against the Denver Broncos, Ragland recorded a sack on Joe Flacco and recovered a fumble forced on Flacco by teammate Anthony Hitchens and returned it for a touchdown in the 30–6 win. Ragland helped the Chiefs win Super Bowl LIV against the San Francisco 49ers 31–20. Ragland recorded 2 tackles in the game.

=== Detroit Lions ===
On April 7, 2020, Ragland signed with the Detroit Lions. He played in 16 games with six starts, recording 52 tackles, one sack, a pass deflection and a forced fumble.

=== New York Giants ===
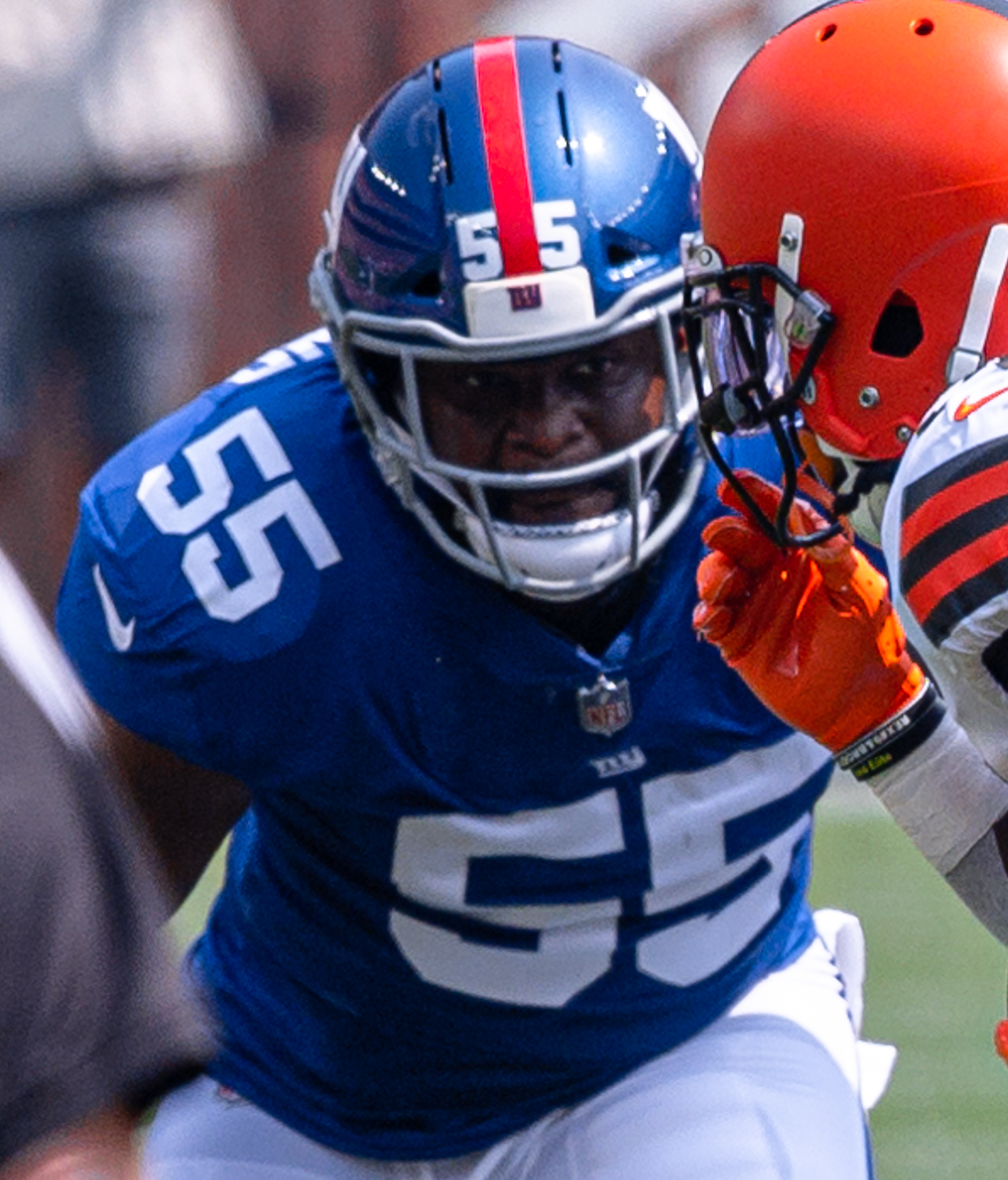
Ragland with the New York Giants in 2021

On March 20, 2021, Ragland signed a one-year contract with the New York Giants. He played in all 17 games with nine starts, recording 67 tackles and two pass deflections.

=== Las Vegas Raiders ===
On November 10, 2022, the Las Vegas Raiders signed Ragland to their practice squad.

=== Cleveland Browns ===
On December 7, 2022, Ragland was signed off the Raiders practice squad by the Cleveland Browns.
