= Vernon Hargreaves =

American football player (born 1995)

Vernon Hargreaves III
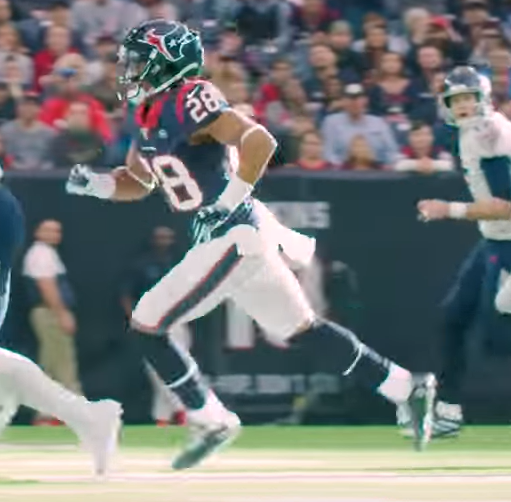
- Hargreaves with the Houston Texans in 2019

No. 28, 26, 29
- Position: Cornerback

Personal information
- Born: June 3, 1995 (age 31); Tampa, Florida, U.S.
- Listed height: 5 ft 10 in (1.78 m)
- Listed weight: 204 lb (93 kg)

Career information
- High school: Wharton (Tampa, Florida)
- College: Florida (2013–2015)
- NFL draft: 2016: 1st round, 11th overall pick

Career history
- Tampa Bay Buccaneers (2016–2019); Houston Texans (2019–2021); Cincinnati Bengals (2021)

Awards and highlights
- PFWA All-Rookie Team (2016); 2× First-team All-American (2014, 2015); 3× First-team All-SEC (2013–2015)

Career NFL statistics
- Total tackles: 290
- Forced fumbles: 2
- Fumble recoveries: 1
- Pass deflections: 31
- Interceptions: 4
- Defensive touchdowns: 1
- Stats at Pro Football Reference

Vernon Hargreaves III (born June 3, 1995) is an American former professional football player who was a cornerback in the National Football League (NFL). He played college football for the Florida Gators and was selected 11th overall by the Tampa Bay Buccaneers in the 2016 NFL draft.

== Early life ==
Hargreaves attended Wharton High School in Tampa, Florida, where he played football. As a sophomore in 2010, he had 44 tackles, two sacks, and two interceptions. As a junior in 2011, he had 49 tackles and two interceptions, along with 11 offensive touchdowns. As a senior in 2012, he had 110 tackles and five interceptions. He was recognized as the most valuable player (MVP) of the 2013 Under Armour All-America Game.

In addition to football, Hargreaves competed in track & field at Wharton. As a senior in 2012, he posted a personal-best time of 22.56 seconds in the 200-meter dash at the Hillsborough County National Division. At the FHSAA District Meet, he placed fourth in the 100-meter dash (11.10 s), second in the long jump (22 ft 3 1/2 in or 6.79 m) and twelfth in the high jump (5 ft 10 in or 1.78 m).

Regarded as a five-star recruit by Rivals.com, Hargreaves was ranked as the nation's best cornerback recruit and the second best player overall.

== College career ==
Hargreaves accepted an athletic scholarship to attend the University of Florida, where he played for head coaches Will Muschamp and Jim McElwain's Florida Gators football teams in Southeastern Conference (SEC) competition in 2013, 2014, and 2015. As a true freshman in 2013, he started 10 of 12 games, recording 38 tackles and three interceptions, and received first-team All-SEC honors at the cornerback position. As a sophomore, he played 12 games with three interceptions, 13 passes defended, and two fumble recoveries on 50 tackles. As a junior, he made four interceptions, a forced fumble, and four passes defended on 33 tackles in 12 games; he earned All-SEC honors for the third consecutive year. After his junior year, he announced his intentions forgo his senior season and enter the 2016 NFL draft.

=== Statistics ===
Season	GP	Defense				
Season	GP	Cmb	TfL	PD	Int	FF
2013	14	38	0.0	10	3	0
2014	14	50	2.0	13	3	0
2015	13	33	1.0	4	4	1
Career	41	121	3.0	27	10	1

== Professional career ==
=== Pre-draft ===
Hargreaves was projected to be a first round pick by NFL draft experts and scouts. He was ranked the top cornerback prospect in the draft by DraftScout.com and NFL analyst Daniel Jeremiah; was ranked the second best cornerback in the draft by NFL analysts Mike Mayock, Lance Zierlein, and Bucky Brooks; and was ranked the second best defensive back in the draft by Sports Illustrated and NFL analyst Charles Davis.

External videos
- Hargreaves' NFL Combine Workout
- Vernon Hargreaves' 40-yard dash

Pre-draft measurables
Height	Weight	Arm length	Hand span	40-yard dash	10-yard split	20-yard split	20-yard shuttle	Vertical jump	Broad jump	Bench press
5 ft 10 1/2 in (1.79 m)	204 lb (93 kg)	30 5/8 in (0.78 m)	8 3/4 in (0.22 m)	4.50 s	1.58 s	2.62 s	3.98 s	39 in (0.99 m)	10 ft 10 in (3.30 m)	15 reps
All values from NFL Combine

=== Tampa Bay Buccaneers ===
==== 2016 ====
The Tampa Bay Buccaneers selected Hargreaves in the first round (11th overall) of the 2016 NFL draft. He was the third cornerback to be selected after Jalen Ramsey and Eli Apple, and the first of seven Florida Gators in 2016. On May 6, 2016, the Buccaneers signed Hargreaves to a fully guaranteed four-year, $14.17 million contract that includes a signing bonus of $8.51 million.

External videos
- Buccaneers draft Hargreaves 11th overall
- Vernon Hargreaves' Draft Interview

Throughout training camp, he participated in an open competition for starting cornerback against Brent Grimes, Johnthan Banks, Alterraun Verner, Jude Adjei-Barimah, and Joel Ross. Head coach Dirk Koetter named Hargreaves to be the third cornerback on the depth chart, behind Grimes and Verner.

He made his professional regular season debut and first career start in the Buccaneers' season-opener at the Atlanta Falcons and recorded two combined tackles during a 31–24 victory. He made his first career tackle on wide receiver Justin Hardy in the first quarter. On October 30, Hargreaves collected a season-high eight solo tackles and two pass deflections during a 30–24 overtime loss to the Oakland Raiders in Week 8. In Week 14, he made three solo tackles, broke up a pass, and made his first career interception off a pass by quarterback Drew Brees in the Buccaneers' 16–11 victory against the New Orleans Saints. He finished his rookie season with 76 combined tackles (68 solo), nine pass deflections, and an interception in 16 games with 16 starts. He was named to the PFWA All-Rookie Team.

==== 2017 ====
Koetter retained Grimes and Hargreaves as the starting cornerbacks to begin the 2017 regular season. On October 1, 2017, Hargreaves recorded a career-high nine solo tackles and deflected a pass during a 25–23 victory against the New York Giants in Week 4. In Week 8, he tied his season-high of two pass deflections and recorded six combined tackles during a 17–3 loss to the Carolina Panthers. On November 12, Hargreaves made three combined tackles before exiting the Buccaneers' 15–10 win against the New York Jets in the third quarter after sustaining a hamstring injury. He was inactive for the next five games (Weeks 11–15) before the Buccaneers opted to place him on injured reserve on December 20. He finished his second season with 42 combined tackles (37 solo) and five pass deflections in nine games with eight starts.

==== 2018 ====
In Week 1 against the Saints, Hargreaves recorded seven combined tackles, one pass defensed and forced a fumble that was recovered by teammate Justin Evans and returned for a touchdown. He suffered a shoulder injury in the game and was placed on injured reserve on September 12, 2018.

==== 2019 ====
On April 24, 2019, the Buccaneers exercised the fifth-year option on Hargreaves contract. In Week 1 against the San Francisco 49ers, Hargreaves intercepted quarterback Jimmy Garoppolo and returned it 15 yards for a touchdown in the 31–17 loss. In Week 2 against the Panthers, Hargreaves made 12 tackles, including a pivotal stop on fourth down; he pushed running back Christian McCaffrey out of bounds short of the first down marker in a 20–14 win. After starting the first nine games of the season, Hargreaves was waived by the Buccaneers on November 12.

=== Houston Texans ===
On November 13, 2019, Hargreaves was claimed off waivers by the Houston Texans. He was released on February 14, 2020, but re-signed with the Texans on April 6.

In Week 9 of the 2020 season against the Jacksonville Jaguars, Hargreaves recorded his first interception as a Texan off a pass thrown by quarterback Jake Luton during the 27–25 win.

On March 17, 2021, Hargreaves signed a contract extension with the Texans. He entered the season as a starting cornerback, and started five of the eight games he played in before being released on November 3.

=== Cincinnati Bengals ===
On November 4, 2021, Hargreaves was claimed off waivers by the Cincinnati Bengals. Hargreaves was penalized 15 yards for running onto the field in Super Bowl LVI, despite being inactive for the game. Six days later, Hargreaves was fined $5,555.

== NFL career statistics ==
Year	Team	Games		Tackles				Interceptions						Fumbles			
Year	Team	GP	GS	Cmb	Solo	Ast	Sck	PD	Int	Yds	Avg	Lng	TD	FF	FR	Yds	TD
2016	TB	16	16	76	68	8	0.0	9	1	0	0.0	0	0	1	0	0	0
2017	TB	9	8	42	37	5	0.0	5	0	0	0.0	0	0	0	0	0	0
2018	TB	1	1	7	6	1	0.0	1	0	0	0.0	0	0	1	0	0	0
2019	TB	9	9	40	36	4	0.0	4	1	15	15.0	15	1	0	1	2	0
2019	HOU	6	2	21	16	5	0.0	2	0	0	0.0	0	0	0	0	0	0
2020	HOU	16	16	72	61	11	0.0	7	1	0	0.0	0	0	0	0	0	0
2021	HOU	8	5	27	20	7	0.0	3	1	18	18.0	18	0	0	0	0	0
2021	CIN	4	1	5	1	4	0.0	0	0	0	0.0	0	0	0	0	0	0
Career		69	58	290	245	45	0.0	31	4	33	8.3	18	1	2	1	2	0

== Personal life ==
His father Vernon Hargreaves Jr. is a college football coach who won a national championship as the linebackers coach for the Miami Hurricanes in 2001. His father was an All-American at University of Connecticut in 1984 and 1985, and then played professionally in the Italian Football League.
