= Robert Nkemdiche =

American gridiron football player (born 1994)

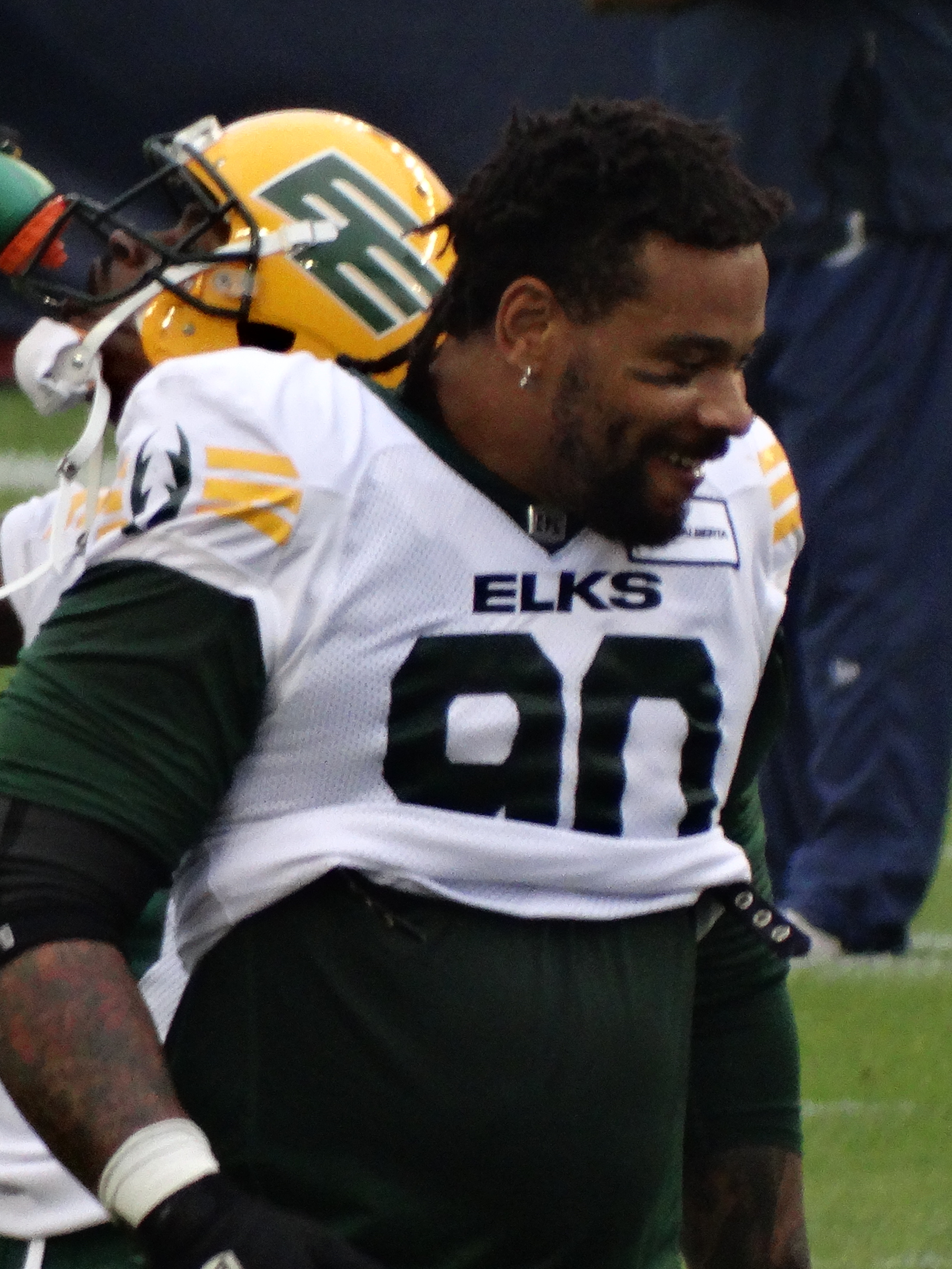
- Nkemdiche with the Edmonton Elks in 2024

Profile
- Position: Defensive tackle

Personal information
- Born: September 19, 1994 (age 32); Atlanta, Georgia, U.S.
- Listed height: 6 ft 3 in (1.91 m)
- Listed weight: 296 lb (134 kg)

Career information
- High school: Grayson (Loganville, Georgia)
- College: Ole Miss (2013–2015)
- NFL draft: 2016: 1st round, 29th overall pick

Career history
- Arizona Cardinals (2016–2018); Miami Dolphins (2019); Seattle Seahawks (2021); San Francisco 49ers (2022)*; Michigan Panthers (2023)*; Jacksonville Sharks (2023); Edmonton Elks (2024)
- * Offseason or practice squad member only

Awards and highlights
- Second-team All-American (2015); First-team All-SEC (2015)

Career NFL statistics
- Total tackles: 59
- Sacks: 4.5
- Pass deflections: 3
- Forced fumbles: 2
- Fumble recoveries: 1
- Defensive touchdowns: 1
- Stats at Pro Football Reference

Robert Chukwudumebi Nkemdiche (/kɪmˈdiːtʃi/ kim-DEE-chee; born September 19, 1994) is an American professional football defensive tackle. He most recently played for the Edmonton Elks of the Canadian Football League (CFL). He attended the University of Mississippi for three years until declaring early for the 2016 NFL draft where he was picked 29th overall by the Arizona Cardinals. He played for the Cardinals for three years from 2016 to 2018, the Miami Dolphins in 2019, and the Seattle Seahawks in 2021.

Regarded by ESPN as the "Southeast's best high school football prospect since the early 1980s," Nkemdiche was the highest-touted prospect committing to the Ole Miss Rebels since Eli Manning in 1999.

== Early life ==
A native of Loganville, Georgia, Nkemdiche attended Grayson High School, where he was a three-sport athlete in football, basketball, and track. He played as a defensive end and running back for the Grayson Rams high school football team. In his junior season, he registered 59 tackles and 18 sacks on defense while also running for 528 yards and scoring 17 touchdowns on offense. Grayson High School went undefeated throughout the season, finishing 15–0 with a GHSA 6A state title win over Marietta Walton. In his senior year, Nkemdiche registered 59 tackles, 12 tackles for loss, and seven sacks on defense, while on offense, he had 235 total rushing yards and 10 touchdowns. Early in the season, Grayson defeated Dalvin Cook's Miami (FL) Central 35–3 in a game that was nationally televised on ESPN. The Rams went on to a 10–2 season record, and were upset by Mitch Hyatt's North Gwinnett in the second round of the GHSA 6A state playoffs. Nkemdiche was the Gwinnett Daily Post Defensive Player of the Year. He finished his career at Grayson with 41 career sacks. He was named first-team All-American as a junior by MaxPreps, as well as second-team as a senior.

In addition, Nkemdiche ran track & field during his junior season. At the 2011 Gwinnett County T&F Championship, he earned second-place finishes in both the shot put, with a throw of 13.41 meters (43 ft, 8 in), and the discus, with a throw of 37.98 meters (124 ft, 5 in). In addition, he had marks of a 350-pound max bench press, 335-pound power clean, 500-pound squat, and a 4.56-second 40-yard dash time.

=== Recruiting ===
Regarded as a five-star recruit by both Rivals.com and Scout.com, Nkemdiche was not only considered the No. 1 defensive line prospect of his class, but also the consensus No. 1 player overall. He was only the fourth player since 2002 to be the consensus No. 1 prospect, along with Jadeveon Clowney, Vince Young, and Ernie Sims. Nkemdiche went wire-to-wire as the No. 1 overall player in the Rivals.com Top100, also the first since Clowney.

Robert and his older brother, Denzel, originally planned attending college together. After Denzel Nkemdiche signed with Ole Miss, Robert was believed to follow. However, he instead committed to Clemson on June 14, 2012. In October 2012, ESPN The Magazine reported that Nkemdiche was not firm on his non-binding verbal commitment, and was still considering other schools, including Ole Miss. Consequently, Nkemdiche decommitted from Clemson in November 2012, re-considering a number of schools including Clemson, Ole Miss, Alabama, and Georgia. By January 2013, he narrowed his list down to just Ole Miss and Louisiana State.

Giving her opinion on their sons' college selection, Nkemdiche's mother said she would "love for them to play together, as well as have the power of two". That way, she would not have to worry about going to different games—taking pressure off of her shoulders. Also, on top of the family tie to Ole Miss, Nkemdiche was said to have a close relationship with the head coach of the Ole Miss football team, Hugh Freeze. In November 2012, Denzel Nkemdiche told reporters that Robert personally told him that he was going to commit to Ole Miss. Robert Nkemdiche indeed committed to Ole Miss on National Signing Day to play college football under head coach Hugh Freeze.

== College career ==
One of the most highly touted recruits in the program's history, Nkemdiche arrived at Ole Miss with plenty of hype, being named the Southeastern Conference (SEC)'s Top Impact Freshman by Sporting News before the season. He played in 11 games with 10 starts (six at defensive end and four at defensive tackle), and amassed 34 tackles (25 solo), 2.0 sacks, two pass breakups, and three quarterback hurries on the 2013 season. Nkemdiche made his college debut against conference opponent Vanderbilt, posting two tackles with a tackle-for-loss and a pass break-up. He missed the Louisiana State and Idaho games with a strained hamstring. After the season, Nkemdiche was named Freshman All-SEC by the league's coaches, and a First team Freshman All-American selection by Athlon and College Football News. As a sophomore, Nkemdiche started every game at the defensive tackle position on an Ole Miss defensive line that led the nation in scoring defense (16.0 ppg) and lead the SEC in tackles for loss (7.6/game). Nkemdiche himself contributed 35 tackles with 4.0 tackles-for-loss, 2.0 sacks, and a pass breakup on the season. His best game was against in-state rival Mississippi State, in which he was credited for a career-high seven tackles, of which three were solo, and one tackle-for-a-loss. Nkemdiche was a semifinalist for the Lombardi Award and was named All-SEC first team by Associated Press (AP), as well as All-America second team by AP, Sporting News, USA Today, and CBS Sports.

After an incident involving marijuana (see below) in December 2015, Nkemdiche was suspended for the 2016 Sugar Bowl against Oklahoma State. After the season, Nkemdiche decided to forgo his senior year and enter the 2016 NFL draft.

== Professional career ==
Pre-draft measurables
Height	Weight	Arm length	Hand span	Wingspan	40-yard dash	10-yard split	20-yard split	Vertical jump	Broad jump	Bench press
6 ft 3 1/2 in (1.92 m)	294 lb (133 kg)	33 7/8 in (0.86 m)	10 3/4 in (0.27 m)	6 ft 8 5/8 in (2.05 m)	4.87 s	1.68 s	2.84 s	35.0 in (0.89 m)	9 ft 8 in (2.95 m)	28 reps
All values from NFL Combine

=== Arizona Cardinals ===
The Arizona Cardinals selected Nkemdiche in the first round (29th overall) of the 2016 NFL draft.

On May 29, 2016, the Cardinals signed Nkemdiche to a four-year, $8.60 million contract that includes $8.15 million guaranteed and a signing bonus $4.45 million.

He only played in five games and recorded one tackle during his rookie season. In his second season in 2017, he played in 12 games, recording 11 tackles and a forced fumble.

In Week 1 of the 2018 season, Nkemdiche recorded his first career sack. In Week 14, he suffered a knee injury that required season-ending surgery. He was placed on injured reserve on December 11, 2018. He finished the season with 32 tackles, 4.5 sacks, and a forced fumble.

On May 2, 2019, the Cardinals declined the fifth-year option on Nkemdiche's contract. On July 28, Nkemdiche was waived by the Cardinals with a failed physical designation.

=== Miami Dolphins ===
On August 8, 2019, Nkemdiche was signed by the Miami Dolphins on a one-year $1.16 million contract. He was placed on the reserve/physically unable to perform (PUP) list to start the season while recovering from knee surgery. He was activated off PUP on October 28, prior to Week 8. Nkemdiche was waived by the Dolphins on November 5. Nkemdiche was suspended two weeks by the NFL on November 13. He was reinstated from suspension on November 26.

=== Seattle Seahawks ===
On April 29, 2021, Nkemdiche signed with the Seattle Seahawks. He was released on August 31, and re-signed to the practice squad the next day. Nkemdiche was promoted to the active roster on September 28.

=== San Francisco 49ers ===
On July 26, 2022, Nkemdiche signed with the San Francisco 49ers. He was released by San Francisco on August 16.

=== Michigan Panthers ===
On January 11, 2023, Nkemdiche signed with the Michigan Panthers of the United States Football League (USFL). He was released on April 10.

=== Edmonton Elks ===
On January 22, 2024, Nkemdiche signed with the Edmonton Elks of the Canadian Football League (CFL). He played in the first four games of the season where he had seven defensive tackles and two sacks before being moved to the injured list. Nkemdiche was released by Edmonton on July 23.

== Personal life ==
Nkemdiche was born in Atlanta, Georgia, to Nigerian immigrants Beverly and Sunday Nkemdiche. His father, a cardiologist, has reportedly applied for a researcher position at University of Mississippi Medical Center in Jackson, Mississippi. Nkemdiche's mother, a politician, returned to Nigeria in 2009 and as of September 2011 represents Onitsha South in the Anambra State House of Assembly. His older brother, Denzel Nkemdiche, played linebacker for Ole Miss.

On December 12, 2015, Nkemdiche fell from a fourth-floor window of the Grand Hyatt Atlanta in Buckhead. "It appears that the victim (Nkemdiche) broke the window and then walked approximately 15 feet and climbed over a wall and fell approximately 15 feet," read the Atlanta Police Department report. Nkemdiche was conscious and in stable condition when officers reported to the scene, and was immediately transported to Grady Memorial Hospital. Police later found seven marijuana cigarettes in Nkemdiche's room, leading him to be charged with drug possession.

On March 1, 2025, Nkemdiche was arrested in Kennesaw, GA by Cobb County Police for disorderly conduct, driving under the influence, driving with a suspended license, and driving without proof of insurance. This followed an incident where Nkemdiche allegedly threatened the manager of Bowlero Kennesaw, a bowling alley. Police found him in his vehicle in the parking lot of the bowling alley when they arrived. He was released on bond, and the case is ongoing.

On July 23, 2025, Nkemdiche was arrested by Gwinnett County Police for allegedly shoplifting a bottle of wine from a gas station in Buford, GA. The case is ongoing.

On February 25, 2026, Nkemdiche was again arrested for shoplifting at a Kroger grocery store. Union City Police Department in Union City, Georgia responded to the call and found Nkemdiche with almond milk, frozen dinners and candy bars stuffed in his sweatpants. Bodycam footage was released the following month showing police heckling Nkemdiche for lying to them about the theft. “You can say whatever you want to say. But I just watched you walk out of here with a big-ass bulge in your pants. I asked you what it was. You said nothing. Then, to give you the benefit of the doubt, I was like, ‘OK. Maybe he’s just got, I don’t know, like, a condition.’ I let you go, and I see you just take off running behind the gas station…Yes the f—k you did (steal from the grocery store) Stop lying to me” the officer said. A Kroger representative declined to press charges however, officers booked him that evening after discovering multiple warrants against him across the country. He was later released from custody.
