= Kyler Kerbyson =

American football player (born 1993)

No. 77
- Position: Offensive lineman

Personal information
- Born: July 7, 1993 (age 33); Garland, Texas, U.S.
- Listed height: 6 ft 4 in (1.93 m)
- Listed weight: 318 lb (144 kg)

Career information
- High school: Knoxville Catholic (Knoxville, Tennessee)
- College: Tennessee (2011–2015)
- NFL draft: 2016: undrafted

Career history
- Tampa Bay Buccaneers (2016)*; New England Patriots (2016)*
- * Offseason or practice squad member only

Awards and highlights
- Second-team All-SEC (2015)

Kyler Brian Kerbyson (born July 7, 1993) is an American former professional football offensive lineman. He played college football for the Tennessee Volunteers.

== Early life ==
Kerbyson attended and played high school football at Knoxville Catholic High School in Knoxville, Tennessee.

== College career ==
Kerbyson attended the University of Tennessee from 2011–2015 under head coaches Derek Dooley and Butch Jones. He redshirted as a freshman in the 2011 season. In the 2012 season, he made his collegiate debut against Georgia State and appeared in seven games. In the 2013 season, he appeared in 12 games in a backup role on the offensive line. Due to massive offseason losses to the offensive line to the 2014 NFL draft, Kerbyson was forced into a leadership role. He started all 13 games at three different spots, right tackle, left tackle, and left guard, in 2014 for the Volunteers. In his final collegiate season in 2015, he started in all 13 games and helped block for one of the most productive offenses in Tennessee history.

== Professional career ==
Kerbyson went undrafted in the 2016 NFL draft. He signed to the New England Patriots on July 25, 2016, and later cut on August 15. On August 22, he was signed to the Tampa Bay Buccaneers but was later cut on September 3. He was added to the Buccaneers' practice squad on November 15 before being released on December 29.
