= Pharoh Cooper =

American football player (born 1995)

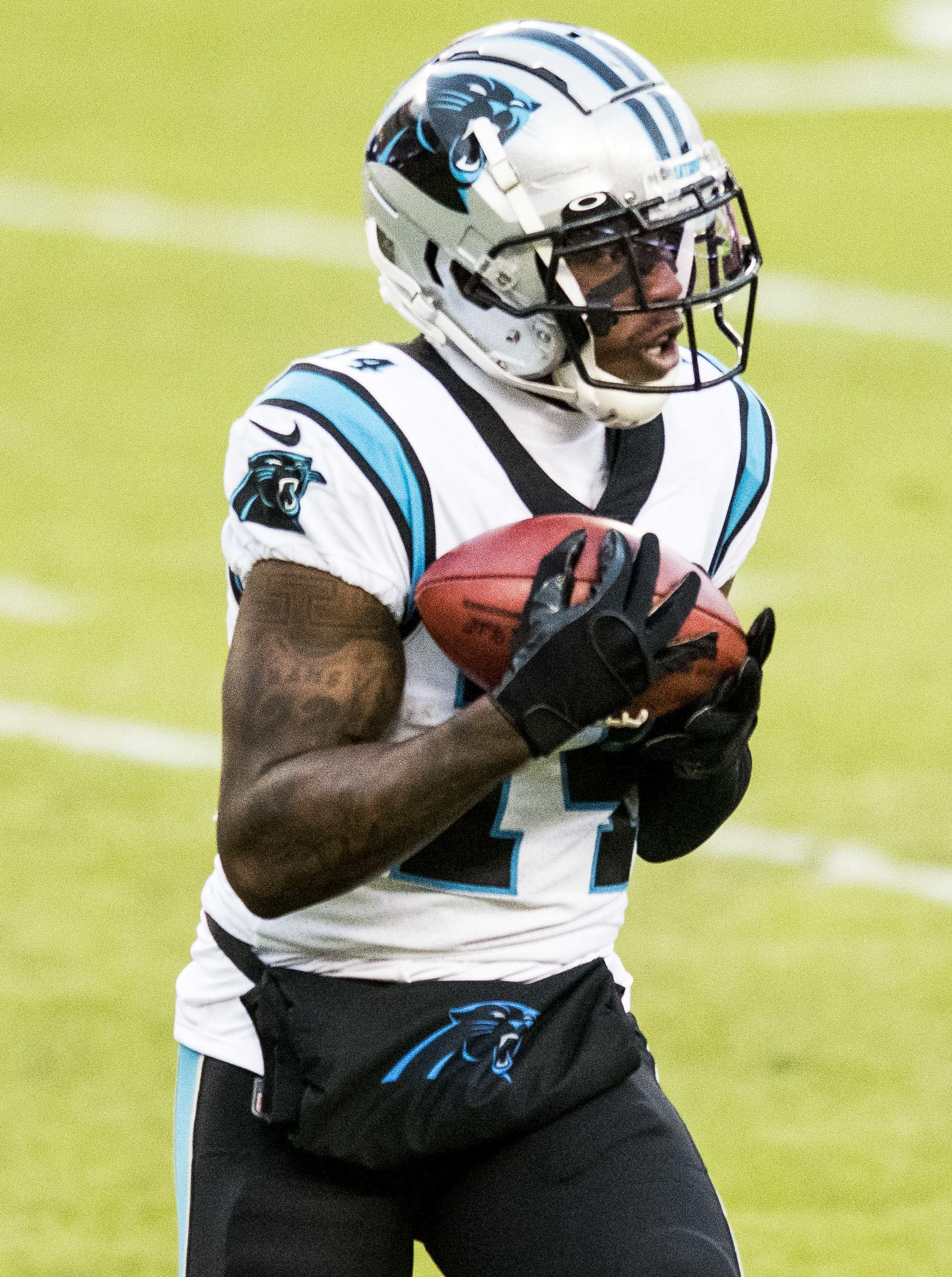
- Cooper with the Carolina Panthers in 2020

No. 10, 12, 16, 14, 83, 15
- Positions: Wide receiver, return specialist

Personal information
- Born: March 7, 1995 (age 31); Havelock, North Carolina, U.S.
- Listed height: 5 ft 11 in (1.80 m)
- Listed weight: 210 lb (95 kg)

Career information
- High school: Havelock
- College: South Carolina (2013–2015)
- NFL draft: 2016: 4th round, 117th overall pick

Career history
- Los Angeles Rams (2016–2018); Arizona Cardinals (2018); Cincinnati Bengals (2019); Arizona Cardinals (2019); Carolina Panthers (2020); Jacksonville Jaguars (2021)*; New York Giants (2021); Arizona Cardinals (2022)
- * Offseason or practice squad member only

Awards and highlights
- First-team All-Pro (2017) (Note: Selected as a Kick Returner); Second-team All-Pro (2017) (Note: Selected as a Punt Returner); Pro Bowl (2017); 2× First-team All-SEC (2014, 2015)

Career NFL statistics
- Receptions: 61
- Receiving yards: 545
- Return yards: 3,954
- Total touchdowns: 2
- Stats at Pro Football Reference

Pharoh Cooper (born March 7, 1995) is an American former professional football player who was a wide receiver in the National Football League (NFL). He played college football for the South Carolina Gamecocks, and was selected by the Los Angeles Rams in the fourth round of the 2016 NFL draft. He was also a member of the Arizona Cardinals, Cincinnati Bengals, Carolina Panthers, Jacksonville Jaguars and New York Giants.

== Early life ==
Cooper's father, grandfather, and brother all served in the Marine Corps. Cooper attended Havelock High School in Havelock, North Carolina. He played quarterback, wide receiver, running back, and defensive back. He was rated by Rivals.com as a four-star recruit. He committed to the University of South Carolina to play college football.

== College career ==
Cooper attended and played college football for the University of South Carolina. He was originally a defensive back before moving to wide receiver prior to the start of his freshman season. He played in 11 of 13 games his freshman season. He had three receptions for 54 receiving yards, 202 rushing yards, one rushing touchdown and also completed two of three pass attempts for 29 yards and a touchdown. Against Tennessee during his sophomore year in 2014, Cooper set the school single-game receiving yards record with 233. In the 2014 Independence Bowl against the Miami Hurricanes, he had nine receptions for 170 yards and a touchdown and was named the game's MVP. For the season, Cooper appeared in all 13 games and was named first team All-SEC after recording 69 receptions for 1,136 yards and nine touchdowns. He also ran for 200 yards with two rushing touchdowns and passed for 78 yards and two touchdowns. As a junior in 2015, Cooper had 873 receiving yards along with 111 rushing yards with 9 total touchdowns. He also had 55 return yards on 12 punt return opportunities. After his junior year, he announced his intentions to enter the 2016 NFL draft.

== Professional career ==
Pre-draft measurables
Height	Weight	Arm length	Hand span	Wingspan	40-yard dash	10-yard split	20-yard split	20-yard shuttle	Three-cone drill	Vertical jump	Broad jump	Bench press
5 ft 11 1/8 in (1.81 m)	203 lb (92 kg)	32 1/4 in (0.82 m)	9 1/8 in (0.23 m)	6 ft 3 in (1.91 m)	4.63 s	1.66 s	2.65 s	4.26 s	7.15 s	31.0 in (0.79 m)	9 ft 10 in (3.00 m)	19 reps
All values from NFL Combine/Pro Day

=== Los Angeles Rams ===
Cooper was drafted by the Los Angeles Rams in the fourth round with the 117th overall pick in the 2016 NFL Draft. On June 9, 2016, Cooper signed a four-year contract with the team. He played in 10 games with three starts in his rookie season, recording 14 receptions for 106 yards while fulfilling kick return and occasional punt return duties.

Following a 16–10 loss to Seattle in Week 5 of 2017, Cooper replaced a struggling Tavon Austin as the Rams' primary return man. In Week 6 of the 2017 season, Cooper scored the first NFL touchdown of his career with a 103-yard kick return touchdown to start the game in a 27–17 win over the Jacksonville Jaguars, earning him NFC Special Teams Player of the Week honors. On December 19, 2017, Cooper was selected to the 2018 Pro Bowl as a return specialist.

On September 12, 2018, Cooper was placed on injured reserve after suffering an ankle injury in Week 1. He was activated off injured reserve on November 19, 2018. On December 18, 2018, Cooper was released by the Rams.

=== Arizona Cardinals (first stint) ===
On December 19, 2018, Cooper was claimed off waivers by the Arizona Cardinals. Appearing in two games, he returned six punts for 67 yards.

On August 30, 2019, Cooper was released by the Cardinals.

=== Cincinnati Bengals ===
On September 1, 2019, Cooper was claimed off waivers by the Cincinnati Bengals. He saw limited action in the Bengals' season-opening 21–20 loss at the Seattle Seahawks, but recorded no receptions or yards. After being inactive for Week 2's game against the San Francisco 49ers, Cooper was waived on September 17, 2019.

=== Arizona Cardinals (second stint) ===
On October 1, 2019, Cooper was re-signed by the Cardinals.

=== Carolina Panthers ===
On March 20, 2020, Cooper signed a one-year contract with the Carolina Panthers.

=== Jacksonville Jaguars ===
On June 3, 2021, Cooper signed a contract with the Jacksonville Jaguars. He was released on August 31, 2021.

=== New York Giants ===
On November 3, 2021, Cooper was signed to the practice squad of the New York Giants. For Week 9 game against the Las Vegas Raiders Cooper was elevated from the practice squad. Cooper was activated from the practice squad as a COVID-19 replacement for the games against the Tampa Bay Buccaneers and the Philadelphia Eagles. On December 4, 2021, Cooper was elevated from the practice squad for the game against the Miami Dolphins. On December 11, 2021, Cooper was activated from the practice squad as a COVID-19 replacement for the game against the Los Angeles Chargers. His contract expired when the team's season ended on January 9, 2022.

=== Arizona Cardinals (third stint) ===
On November 23, 2022, the Cardinals signed Cooper to their practice squad. He was promoted to the active roster on December 28.

On June 10, 2024, Cooper announced his retirement from professional football.

== NFL career statistics ==
=== Regular season ===
Year	Team	Games		Receiving					Kickoff return					Punt return					Fumbles	
Year	Team	GP	GS	Rec	Yds	Avg	Lng	TD	Ret	Yds	Avg	Lng	TD	Ret	Yds	Avg	Lng	TD	Fum	Lost
2016	LAR	10	3	14	106	7.6	23	0	14	323	23.1	51	0	5	5	1.0	6	0	0	0
2017	LAR	16	1	11	84	7.6	26	0	34	932	27.4	103	1	32	399	12.5	53	0	3	2
2018	LAR	5	0	—	—	—	—	—	13	277	21.3	28	0	2	12	6.0	12	0	0	0
2018	ARI	2	0	—	—	—	—	—	—	—	—	—	—	6	67	11.2	45	0	1	0
2019	CIN	1	0	—	—	—	—	—	—	—	—	—	—	—	—	—	—	—	0	0
2019	ARI	13	1	25	243	9.7	28	1	25	561	22.4	39	0	17	129	7.6	29	0	0	0
2020	CAR	16	1	5	73	14.6	32	0	18	430	23.9	38	0	20	117	5.9	20	0	1	0
2021	NYG	8	0	4	33	8.3	15	0	12	207	17.3	26	0	11	90	8.2	17	0	0	0
2022	ARI	5	1	2	6	3.0	3	0	12	288	24.0	33	0	9	117	13.0	28	0	0	0
Total		75	7	61	545	8.9	32	1	128	3,018	23.6	103	1	102	936	9.2	53	0	5	2

=== Postseason ===
Year	Team	Games		Receiving					Kickoff return					Punt return					Fumbles	
Year	Team	GP	GS	Rec	Yds	Avg	Lng	TD	Ret	Yds	Avg	Lng	TD	Ret	Yds	Avg	Lng	TD	Fum	Lost
2017	LAR	1	0	—	—	—	—	—	6	120	20.0	26	0	4	7	1.8	9	0	1	1
Total		1	0	0	0	0.0	0	0	6	120	20.0	26	0	4	7	1.8	9	0	1	1
