= Skai Moore =

American football player (born 1995)

No. 55
- Position: Linebacker

Personal information
- Born: January 8, 1995 (age 31); Cooper City, Florida, U.S.
- Listed height: 6 ft 2 in (1.88 m)
- Listed weight: 225 lb (102 kg)

Career information
- High school: NSU University School (Fort Lauderdale, Florida)
- College: South Carolina
- NFL draft: 2018: undrafted

Career history
- Indianapolis Colts (2018–2021)

Awards and highlights
- Second-team All-SEC (2015)

Career NFL statistics
- Total tackles: 4
- Stats at Pro Football Reference

Skai Moore (born January 8, 1995) is an American former professional football player who was a linebacker for the Indianapolis Colts of the National Football League (NFL). He played college football for the South Carolina Gamecocks and signed with the Colts as an undrafted free agent in 2018.

== Professional career ==
Moore signed with the Indianapolis Colts as an undrafted free agent on May 1, 2018. After making the Colts 53-man roster, he played in three games, starting one, before being waived on September 28, 2018. He was re-signed to the practice squad on October 1, 2018. He was promoted back to the active roster on October 4, 2018. He was waived again on October 13, 2018, and was re-signed to the practice squad. He was promoted back to the active roster on November 9, 2018. He was placed on injured reserve on December 18, 2018.

On August 31, 2019, Moore was waived by the Colts and was signed to the practice squad the next day. He was promoted to the active roster on December 28, 2019.

Moore chose to opt-out of the 2020 season due to the COVID-19 pandemic on August 4, 2020. He was waived/injured on August 23, 2021, and placed on injured reserve.
