= Trae Elston =

American gridiron football player (born 1994)

No. 36, 35
- Position: Safety

Personal information
- Born: February 16, 1994 (age 32); Anniston, Alabama, U.S.
- Listed height: 6 ft 0 in (1.83 m)
- Listed weight: 203 lb (92 kg)

Career information
- High school: Oxford (Oxford, Alabama)
- College: Ole Miss
- NFL draft: 2016: undrafted

Career history
- New Orleans Saints (2016)*; Tampa Bay Buccaneers (2016)*; Cleveland Browns (2016); Buffalo Bills (2017); Philadelphia Eagles (2017); Buffalo Bills (2017); Miami Dolphins (2017); Philadelphia Eagles (2019)*; New Orleans Saints (2019)*; Houston Roughnecks (2020); Calgary Stampeders (2021); New Jersey Generals (2022–2023)
- * Offseason or practice squad member only

Awards and highlights
- First-team All-SEC (2015)

Career NFL statistics
- Total tackles: 19
- Pass deflections: 1
- Interceptions: 1
- Stats at Pro Football Reference

Trae Elston (born February 16, 1994) is an American former professional football player who was a safety in the National Football League (NFL). The All-American played college football for the Ole Miss Rebels. Elston was a member of the 2017 Super Bowl-winning Philadelphia Eagles.

== Professional career ==
=== New Orleans Saints ===
Elston was signed by the New Orleans Saints as an undrafted free agent on May 2, 2016. He was released on September 3, 2016.

=== Tampa Bay Buccaneers ===
Elston was signed to the Buccaneers' practice squad on October 17, 2016. He was released on November 15, 2016.

=== Cleveland Browns ===
On December 7, 2016, Elston was signed to the Cleveland Browns' active roster. He was waived on December 21, 2016, and was re-signed to the practice squad. He signed a reserve/future contract with the Browns on January 2, 2017.

On April 20, 2017, Elston was waived by the Browns.

=== Buffalo Bills ===
On April 21, 2017, Elston was claimed off waivers by the Buffalo Bills. He was waived on September 19, 2017.

=== Philadelphia Eagles ===
On September 20, 2017, Elston was claimed off waivers by the Philadelphia Eagles. He was waived by the Eagles on September 30, 2017.

=== Buffalo Bills (second stint) ===
On October 3, 2017, Elston was signed by the Bills.

Elston made his first career NFL start against the Oakland Raiders on October 29, 2017. In that game, Elston recorded his first career interception by picking off Raiders quarterback Derek Carr late in the 4th quarter and led all defensive players with a career high 11 tackles (8 solo). The Bills won the game 34–14. On December 28, 2017, Elston was waived by the Bills.

=== Miami Dolphins ===
On December 29, 2017, Elston was claimed off waivers by the Miami Dolphins. He was waived on September 1, 2018.

=== Philadelphia Eagles (second stint) ===
On June 5, 2019, Elston signed with the Philadelphia Eagles. He was waived during final roster cuts on August 30, 2019.

=== New Orleans Saints (second stint) ===
On October 23, 2019, Elston was signed to the New Orleans Saints practice squad. He was released on November 20, 2019.

=== Houston Roughnecks ===
Elston was selected in the third round during phase four in the 2020 XFL Draft by the Houston Roughnecks. He was placed on injured reserve on January 30, 2020. He had his contract terminated when the league suspended operations on April 10, 2020.

=== Calgary Stampeders ===
Elston signed with the Calgary Stampeders of the CFL on January 25, 2021.

=== New Jersey Generals ===
Elston was selected in the 9th round of the 2022 USFL draft by the New Jersey Generals. He was transferred to the team's practice squad on April 14, 2022, and moved to the active roster on April 16. He was ruled inactive for the team's game against the New Orleans Breakers on May 14. He was transferred back to the active roster on May 20.

Elston was placed on injured reserve on May 31, 2023. The Generals folded when the XFL and USFL merged to create the United Football League (UFL).
