= Sebastian Tretola =

American football player (born 1992)

No. 79, 73
- Position: Guard

Personal information
- Born: May 1, 1992 (age 34); San Bernardino, California, U.S.
- Listed height: 6 ft 4 in (1.93 m)
- Listed weight: 317 lb (144 kg)

Career information
- High school: Cajon (San Bernardino)
- College: Iowa Western C.C. (2012–2013); Arkansas (2014–2015)
- NFL draft: 2016: 6th round, 193rd overall pick

Career history
- Tennessee Titans (2016); Houston Roughnecks (2020)

Awards and highlights
- Mid Season All-XFL (2020); Jacobs Blocking Trophy (2015); First-team All-SEC (2015)
- Stats at Pro Football Reference

Sebastian Giovanni Andre Tretola (born May 1, 1992) is an American former professional football player who was a guard for the Tennessee Titans of the National Football League (NFL). He played college football for the Arkansas Razorbacks, Iowa Western, and Nevada Wolf Pack.

== Professional career ==
=== Tennessee Titans ===
Tretola was selected by the Tennessee Titans in the sixth round, 193rd overall, in the 2016 NFL draft.

Tretola was waived by the Titans on July 28, 2017, days after being shot in the leg.

=== Houston Roughnecks ===
On November 22, 2019, Tretola was selected by the Houston Roughnecks of the XFL in the 2020 XFL Supplemental Draft. He had his contract terminated when the league suspended operations on April 10, 2020.

== Legal issues ==
On May 10, 2017, Tretola and teammate Tajae Sharpe were named as defendants in a federal civil Lawsuit that alleges the teammates were at a Nashville bar watching the 2017 NFL draft. Dante R. Satterfield, the plaintiff in the lawsuit, claims he told Sharpe he'd probably lose playing time as a result of the Titans selecting wide receiver Corey Davis in the first round. The report alleges Sharpe responded by challenging him to a fight in a back alley and was accompanied by Tretola as a lookout. Satterfield claims he was knocked unconscious for 12 hours, suffered a concussion, and facial fractures from the incident and is suing for $500,000 in damages.
