= 2014 Florida Gators football team =

American college football season

2014 Florida Gators football

Birmingham Bowl champion

Birmingham Bowl, W 28–20 vs. East Carolina
- Conference: Southeastern Conference
- Eastern Division
- Record: 7–5 (4–4 SEC)
- Head coach: Will Muschamp (4th season; regular season); D. J. Durkin (interim; bowl game)
- Offensive coordinator: Kurt Roper (1st season)
- Offensive scheme: Spread
- Defensive coordinator: D. J. Durkin (1st season)
- Base defense: Multiple 4–3
- Home stadium: Ben Hill Griffin Stadium

2014 Southeastern Conference football standings
	Conf.			Overall
Team	W		L	W		L
Eastern Division
No. 14 Missouri x	7	–	1	11	–	3
No. 9 Georgia	6	–	2	10	–	3
Florida	4	–	4	7	–	5
Tennessee	3	–	5	7	–	6
South Carolina	3	–	5	7	–	6
Kentucky	2	–	6	5	–	7
Vanderbilt	0	–	8	3	–	9
Western Division
No. 4 Alabama x$^	7	–	1	12	–	2
No. 11 Mississippi State	6	–	2	10	–	3
No. 17 Ole Miss *	5	–	3	9	–	4
No. 22 Auburn	4	–	4	8	–	5
LSU *	4	–	4	8	–	5
Texas A&M	3	–	5	8	–	5
Arkansas	2	–	6	7	–	6
Championship: Alabama 42, Missouri 13
^ – College Football Playoff participant; $ – Conference champion; x – Division champion/co-champions; * LSU and Ole Miss vacated all wins (except for Ole Miss' win over Presbyterian) due to NCAA violations.; Rankings from AP Poll

The 2014 Florida Gators football team represented the University of Florida in the sport of American football during the 2014 NCAA Division I FBS football season. The Gators competed in the Football Bowl Subdivision (FBS) of the National Collegiate Athletic Association (NCAA), and the Eastern Division of the Southeastern Conference (SEC). They played their home games at Ben Hill Griffin Stadium on the university's campus in Gainesville, Florida. The 2014 season was the Gators' fourth and final season under head coach Will Muschamp.

On November 16, following an overtime home loss to South Carolina that eliminated the Gators from the SEC East race, Muschamp was informed that he would not return as Florida's head coach in 2015, but he agreed to coach the final two games of the regular season. The Gators became bowl eligible after a win over Eastern Kentucky and dropped Muschamp's last game to Florida State. Under interim coach D.J. Durkin, the Gators won the Birmingham Bowl against East Carolina to finish the season 7–5. After four seasons, Muschamp compiled a 28–21 overall, 17–15 conference record.

== Preseason ==
On April 12, 2014, the Gators played the Orange and Blue game, the program's annual intra-squad spring game. The result was a 23–23 tie, with the Orange team coming back to score a game-tying touchdown and extra point as time expired. The Orange team was led by quarterbacks Skyler Mornhinweg and highly recruited freshman Will Grier, and the Blue team was led by returning fourth-year junior Jeff Driskel.

== Preseason awards ==
Watch lists

- Maxwell – Jeff Driskel
- Davey O'Brien – Jeff Driskel
- Doak walker – Kelvin Taylor
- Rimington – Max Garcia
- Outland – D. J. Humphries
- Bednarik – Vernon Hargreaves
- Bednarik – Dante Fowler
- Bronko nagurski – Vernon Hargreaves
- Bronko nagurski – Dante Fowler
- Jim thorpe – Vernon Hargreaves
- Walter camp – Vernon Hargreaves
- Lott impact – Vernon Hargreaves

Pre-Season All American teams

Phil Steele

- 1st-team – Vernon Hargreaves
- 2nd-team – Dante Fowler
- 2nd-team – Kyle Christy
- 3rd-team – Jeff Driskel
- 3rd-team – Andre Debose
- 3rd-team – D. J. Humphries
- 4th-team – Kelvin Taylor
- 4th-team – Demarcus Robinson
- 4th-team – Antonio Morrison

Lindy's Sports

- 1st-team – Vernon Hargreaves
- 1st-team – Dante Fowler
- 2nd-team – Dante Fowler
- 2nd-team – Chaz Green
- 3rd-team – D. J. Humphries
- 3rd-team – Andre Debose
- 3rd-team – Kyle Christy

Athlon Sports

- 1st-team – Vernon Hargreaves
- 1st-team – Dante Fowler
- 2nd-team – Jonathan Bullard
- 3rd-team – Kelvin Taylor
- 3rd-team – Andre Debose

Sporting News

- 1st-team – Vernon Hargreaves
- 2nd-team – Dante Fowler

Media

- 1st-team – Dante Fowler
- 1st-team – Vernon Hargreaves III
- 2nd-team – Andre Debose
- 3rd-team – Chaz Green

== 2014 recruiting class ==
College recruiting (2014)
Name	Hometown	School	Height	Weight	Commit date
Teez Tabor; CB	Washington, D.C.	Friendship Collegiate Academy	6 ft 1 in (1.85 m)	188 lb (85 kg)	Jan 9, 2014
Teez Tabor; CB	Recruit ratings: Scout: Rivals: 247Sports: ESPN:				
David Sharpe; OT	Jacksonville, Florida	Providence School of Jacksonville	6 ft 6 in (1.98 m)	288 lb (131 kg)	Dec 12, 2013
David Sharpe; OT	Recruit ratings: Scout: Rivals: 247Sports: ESPN:				
Gerald Willis; DT	New Orleans	Edna Karr High School	6 ft 3 in (1.91 m)	275 lb (125 kg)	Jan 2, 2014
Gerald Willis; DT	Recruit ratings: Scout: Rivals: 247Sports: ESPN:				
Will Grier; QB	Davidson, North Carolina	Davidson Day School	6 ft 3 in (1.91 m)	181 lb (82 kg)	Dec 19, 2012
Will Grier; QB	Recruit ratings: Scout: Rivals: 247Sports: ESPN:				
Thomas Holley; DT	Brooklyn, New York	Lincoln High School	6 ft 4 in (1.93 m)	303 lb (137 kg)	Jan 15, 2014
Thomas Holley; DT	Recruit ratings: Scout: Rivals: 247Sports: ESPN:				
J. C. Jackson; ATH	Immokalee, Florida	Immokalee High School	6 ft 0 in (1.83 m)	185 lb (84 kg)	Jun 8, 2013
J. C. Jackson; ATH	Recruit ratings: Scout: Rivals: 247Sports: ESPN:				
Treon Harris; QB	Miami	Booker T. Washington High School	5 ft 11 in (1.80 m)	186 lb (84 kg)	Feb 5, 2014
Treon Harris; QB	Recruit ratings: Scout: Rivals: 247Sports: ESPN:				
Moral Stephens; WR	Perry, Florida	Taylor County High School	6 ft 3 in (1.91 m)	200 lb (91 kg)	Dec 12, 2013
Moral Stephens; WR	Recruit ratings: Scout: Rivals: 247Sports: ESPN:				
Duke Dawson; CB	Cross City, Florida	Dixie County High School	5 ft 11 in (1.80 m)	197 lb (89 kg)	Jan 8, 2013
Duke Dawson; CB	Recruit ratings: Scout: Rivals: 247Sports: ESPN:				
Khairi Clark; DT	Hollywood, Florida	Chaminade-Madonna College Preparatory School	6 ft 2 in (1.88 m)	329 lb (149 kg)	Jun 22, 2013
Khairi Clark; DT	Recruit ratings: Scout: Rivals: 247Sports: ESPN:				
Brandon Powell; ATH	Deerfield Beach, Florida	Deerfield Beach High School	5 ft 9 in (1.75 m)	169 lb (77 kg)	Jan 10, 2014
Brandon Powell; ATH	Recruit ratings: Scout: Rivals: 247Sports: ESPN:				
Justus Reed; DE	Clearwater, Florida	Clearwater Central Catholic High School	6 ft 3 in (1.91 m)	215 lb (98 kg)	Jul 25, 2013
Justus Reed; DE	Recruit ratings: Scout: Rivals: 247Sports: ESPN:				
Quincy Wilson; S	Fort Lauderdale, Florida	University School of Nova South	6 ft 1 in (1.85 m)	197 lb (89 kg)	Aug 12, 2013
Quincy Wilson; S	Recruit ratings: Scout: Rivals: 247Sports: ESPN:				
Ryan Sousa; WR	Orlando, Florida	Lake Nona High School	6 ft 0 in (1.83 m)	177 lb (80 kg)	Dec 2, 2013
Ryan Sousa; WR	Recruit ratings: Scout: Rivals: 247Sports: ESPN:				
Taven Bryan; DE	Casper, Wyoming	Natrona County High School	6 ft 4 in (1.93 m)	250 lb (110 kg)	Jun 10, 2013
Taven Bryan; DE	Recruit ratings: Scout: Rivals: 247Sports: ESPN:				
Nolan Kelleher; OG	Mount Pleasant, South Carolina	Wando High School	6 ft 5 in (1.96 m)	310 lb (140 kg)	Aug 10, 2013
Nolan Kelleher; OG	Recruit ratings: Scout: Rivals: 247Sports: ESPN:				
Kavaris Harkless; OT	Jacksonville, Florida	Trinity Christian Academy	6 ft 5 in (1.96 m)	269 lb (122 kg)	Jan 5, 2014
Kavaris Harkless; OT	Recruit ratings: Scout: Rivals: 247Sports: ESPN:				
DeAndre Goolsby; TE	Derby, Kansas	Derby Senior High School	6 ft 4 in (1.93 m)	225 lb (102 kg)	Nov 8, 2013
DeAndre Goolsby; TE	Recruit ratings: Scout: Rivals: 247Sports: ESPN:				
Travaris Dorsey; OG	Jacksonville, Florida	Raines High School	6 ft 3 in (1.91 m)	314 lb (142 kg)	Feb 16, 2013
Travaris Dorsey; OG	Recruit ratings: Scout: Rivals: 247Sports: ESPN:				
Andrew Mike; OT	Tucson, Arizona	Sabino High School	6 ft 6 in (1.98 m)	278 lb (126 kg)	Feb 3, 2014
Andrew Mike; OT	Recruit ratings: Scout: Rivals: 247Sports: ESPN:				
C.J. Worton; WR	Homestead, Florida	South Dade High School	6 ft 1 in (1.85 m)	171 lb (78 kg)	Feb 5, 2014
C.J. Worton; WR	Recruit ratings: Scout: Rivals: 247Sports: ESPN:				
C'yontai Lewis; TE	Tuscaloosa, Alabama	Northridge High School	6 ft 4 in (1.93 m)	230 lb (100 kg)	May 23, 2013
C'yontai Lewis; TE	Recruit ratings: Scout: Rivals: 247Sports: ESPN:				
Drew Sarvary; OT	Tallahassee, Florida	Tyler Junior College	6 ft 6 in (1.98 m)	310 lb (140 kg)	Dec 18, 2013
Drew Sarvary; OT	Recruit ratings: Scout: Rivals: 247Sports: ESPN:				
Deiondre Porter; ATH	Tampa, Florida	Thomas Jefferson High School	6 ft 1 in (1.85 m)	167 lb (76 kg)	Jan 20, 2014
Deiondre Porter; ATH	Recruit ratings: Scout: Rivals: 247Sports: ESPN:				
Overall recruit ranking: Scout: 9 Rivals: 8 247Sports: 9 ESPN: 6
Note: In many cases, Scout, Rivals, 247Sports, On3, and ESPN may conflict in their listings of height and weight.; In these cases, the average was taken. ESPN grades are on a 100-point scale.; Sources: "Florida Signee List 2014". Rivals.; "2014 Player Signees – Florida". ESPN.; "2014 Team Ranking". Rivals.com.

== Team statistics ==
	UF	OPP
Scoring	363	253
Points per game	30.2	21.1
First downs	210	216
Rushing	111	78
Passing	86	114
Penalty	13	24
Total offense	4,411	3,957
Avg per play	5.2	4.6
Avg per game	367.6	329.8
Fumbles–Lost	19–10	29–14
Penalties–Yards	80–710	87–699
Avg per game	59.2	58.2

	UF	OPP
Punts–Yards	65–2,832	76–3,148
Avg per punt	43.6	41.4
Time of possession/Game	29:56	30:04
3rd down conversions	70/192	76/196
4th down conversions	8/15	6/18
Touchdowns scored	44	30
Field goals–Attempts	19–24	15–20
PAT–Attempts	42–43	26–27
Attendance	515,001	321,952
Games/Avg per game	6/85,834	4/80,488
Neutral site games	2/56,544	

	1	2	3	4	OT	Total
Opponents	76	40	72	49	16	253
Florida	85	88	86	85	19	363

As of January 3, 2015

== Schedule ==
Date	Time	Opponent	Site	TV	Result	Attendance
August 30	7:00 p.m.	Idaho*	Ben Hill Griffin Stadium; Gainesville, FL	ESPNU	canceled^{[a]}	
September 6	4:00 p.m.	Eastern Michigan*	Ben Hill Griffin Stadium; Gainesville, FL	SECN	W 65–0	81,049
September 13	7:30 p.m.	Kentucky	Ben Hill Griffin Stadium; Gainesville, FL (SEC Nation) (rivalry)	SECN	W 36–30 ^{3OT}	88,334
September 20	3:30 p.m.	at No. 3 Alabama	Bryant–Denny Stadium; Tuscaloosa, AL (rivalry / SEC Nation)	CBS	L 21–42	101,821
October 4	12:00 p.m.	at Tennessee	Neyland Stadium; Knoxville, TN (rivalry)	SECN	W 10–9	102,455
October 11	7:30 p.m.	LSU	Ben Hill Griffin Stadium; Gainesville, FL (rivalry)	SECN	L 27–30	88,014
October 18	7:00 p.m.	Missouri	Ben Hill Griffin Stadium; Gainesville, FL (HC)	ESPN2	L 13–42	89,117
November 1	3:30 p.m.	vs. No. 9 Georgia	EverBank Field; Jacksonville, FL (rivalry)	CBS	W 38–20	83,004
November 8	7:30 p.m.	at Vanderbilt	Vanderbilt Stadium; Nashville, TN	SECN	W 34–10	35,191
November 15	12:00 p.m.	South Carolina	Ben Hill Griffin Stadium; Gainesville, FL	SECN	L 20–23 ^{OT}	85,088
November 22	12:00 p.m.	No. 14 (FCS) Eastern Kentucky*	Ben Hill Griffin Stadium; Gainesville, FL	SECN	W 52–3	83,399
November 29	3:30 p.m.	at No. 1 Florida State*	Doak Campbell Stadium; Tallahassee, FL (rivalry)	ESPN	L 19–24	82,485
January 3, 2015	12:00 p.m.	vs. East Carolina*	Legion Field; Birmingham, AL (Birmingham Bowl)	ESPN2	W 28–20	30,083
*Non-conference game; Rankings from AP Poll released prior to game; All times are in Eastern time

^{^[a]}The game did not kickoff until 9:50 p.m. due to inclement weather. The game was again delayed due to lightning after 10 seconds of play during which Florida returned the Idaho kickoff to the Idaho 14-yard line. The game was called as "suspended" 40 minutes after the second delay due to unsafe field conditions. The four possible resolutions were (1) resuming the game on a later date (both teams had a bye week on October 25), (2) ending the game with a determined final score, (3) forfeiting the game, or (4) declaring a "no contest" (canceling the game). The athletic directors of both universities decided on September 3 not to reschedule the game, thus declaring it a "no contest." Florida agreed to pay Idaho its promised fee of $975,000 and the schools agreed to schedule a game for the 2018 season.

== Game summaries ==
=== Eastern Michigan ===
Eastern Michigan Eagles at Florida Gators – Game summary

Quarter	1	2	3	4	Total
Eastern Michigan	0	0	0	0	0
Florida	17	13	21	14	65

at Ben Hill Griffin Stadium • Gainesville, Florida

- Date: September 6, 2014
- Game time: 4:00 p.m. EDT
- Game weather: Temperature: 77 °F (25 °C) • Wind: WNW at 4 miles per hour (6.4 km/h) • Weather: humidity 87%, cloudy
- Game attendance: 81,049
- Referee: David Smith
- TV announcers (SEC Network): Tom Hart, Matt Stinchcomb, and Heather Mitts
- Boxscore

Game information

First Quarter

- Florida – Francisco Velez 33-yard field goal, 6:44
- Florida – Kelvin Taylor 31-yard run (Francisco Velez kick), 6:00
- Florida – Matt Jones 40-yard run (Francisco Velez kick), 4:48

Second Quarter

- Florida – Brandon Powell 12-yard run (Francisco Velez kick), 13:49
- Florida – Francisco Velez 36-yard field goal, 6:30
- Florida – Francisco Velez 29-yard field goal, 0:13

Third Quarter

- Florida – Matt Jones 4-yard pass from Jeff Driskel (Francisco Velez kick), 9:18
- Florida – Kelvin Taylor 6-yard run (Francisco Velez kick), 3:33
- Florida – Duke Dawson 36-yard interception return (Francisco Velez kick), 2:51

Fourth Quarter

- Florida – Demarcus Robinson 70-yard pass from Treon Harris (Fernando Velez kick), 14:47
- Florida – Mark Herndon 78-yard pass from Treon Harris (Fernando Velez kick), 12:08

Passing

- EMU – Brogan Roback – 5/10, 29 yards
- FLA – Jeff Driskel – 31/45, 248 yards, 1 touchdown

Rushing

- EMU – Reginald Bell, Jr. – 7 carries, 20 yards; Tyler Allen – 2 carries, 20 yards
- FLA – Kelvin Taylor – 8 carries, 68 yards, 2 touchdowns

Receiving

- EMU – Tyreese Russell – 2 receptions, 16 yards
- FLA – Demarcus Robinson – 6 receptions, 123 yards, 1 touchdown

Tackling

- EMU – Great Ibe and Ray Tillman – 11 tackles
- FLA – Neiron Ball and Michael Taylor – 6 tackles

This game marked the second all-time meeting between Eastern Michigan and Florida, with the first being in 2004 that resulted in a 49–10 Gator win.

=== Kentucky ===
Kentucky Wildcats at Florida Gators – Game summary

Quarter	1	2	3	4	OT	2OT	3OT	Total
Kentucky	0	3	14	3	7	3	0	30
Florida	0	3	17	0	7	3	6	36

at Ben Hill Griffin Stadium • Gainesville, Florida

- Date: September 13, 2014
- Game time: 7:30 p.m. EDT
- Game weather: Temperature: 86 °F (30 °C) • Wind: calm • Weather: humidity 63%
- Game attendance: 88,334
- Referee: Marc Curles
- TV announcers (SEC Network): Brent Musburger, Jesse Palmer, and Maria Taylor
- Boxscore

Game information

Second Quarter

- Florida – Francisco Velez 35-yard field goal, 7:47
- Kentucky – Austin MacGinnis 35-yard field goal, 0:00

Third Quarter

- Florida – Francisco Velez 22-yard field goal, 7:32
- Kentucky – Garrett Johnson 60-yard pass from Patrick Towles (Austin MacGinnis kick), 5:32
- Florida – Tevin Westbrook 10-yard pass from Jeff Driskel (Francisco Velez kick), 4:27
- Kentucky – Garrett Johnson 33-yard pass from Patrick Towles (Austin MacGinnis kick), 3:21
- Florida – Demarcus Robinson 9-yard pass from Jeff Driskel (Francisco Velez kick), 0:25

Fourth Quarter

- Kentucky – Austin MacGinnis 51-yard field goal, 3:52

First Overtime

- Kentucky – Stanley Williams 25-yard pass from Patrick Towles (Austin MacGinnis kick)
- Florida – Demarcus Robinson 9-yard pass from Jeff Driskel (Francisco Velez kick)

Second Overtime

- Florida – Francisco Velez 20-yard field goal
- Kentucky – Austin MacGinnis 26-yard field goal

Third Overtime

- Florida – Matt Jones 1-yard run

Passing

- KEN – Patrick Towles – 24/45, 369 yards, 3 touchdowns, 3 interceptions
- FLA – Jeff Driskel – 25/43, 295 yards, 3 touchdowns, 1 interception

Rushing

- KEN – Braylon Heard – 12 carries, 39 yards
- FLA – Matt Jones – 29 carries, 156 yards, 1 touchdown

Receiving

- KEN – Garrett Johnson – 6 receptions, 154 yards, 2 touchdowns
- FLA – Demarcus Robinson – 15 receptions, 216 yards, 2 touchdowns

Tackling

- KEN – Fred Tiller and Za'Darius Smith – 11 tackles
- FLA – Antonio Morrison – 10 tackles

This was the SEC conference opener for both teams. This was also the earliest the two teams have played since the SEC split into two divisions in 1992. Florida currently had the longest consecutive and annual active winning streak (27) in NCAA history and longest in-conference streak in Southeastern Conference history over Kentucky, who has not beaten Florida since 1986. With this win, they extended this winning streak to 28. This game marked the first overtime game in the Florida–Kentucky series, the first three-overtime game played by Florida, and improves Florida's all-time record in overtime games to 4–2, having won the last four overtime games.

=== Alabama ===
Florida Gators at Alabama Crimson Tide – Game summary

Quarter	1	2	3	4	Total
Florida	14	0	7	0	21
#3 Alabama	14	7	14	7	42

at Bryant–Denny Stadium • Tuscaloosa, Alabama

- Date: September 20, 2014
- Game time: 3:30 p.m.
- Game weather: Temperature: 85 °F (29 °C) • Wind: E at 6 miles per hour (9.7 km/h) • Weather: clear, sunny
- Game attendance: 101,821
- Referee: Tom Ritter
- TV announcers (CBS): Verne Lundquist, Gary Danielson, and Allie LaForce
- Boxscore

Game information

First Quarter

- Alabama – Kenyan Drake 87-yard pass from Blake Sims (Adam Griffith kick), 13:47
- Florida – Valdez Showers 28-yard pass from Jeff Driskel (Francisco Velez kick), 11:26
- Florida – Keanu Neal 49-yard fumble return (Francisco Velez kick), 9:24
- Alabama – Amari Cooper 79-yard pass from Blake Sims (Adam Griffith kick), 4:12

Second Quarter

- Alabama – Jalston Fowler 2-yard pass from Blake Sims (Adam Griffith kick), 4:12

Third Quarter

- Florida – Jeff Driskel 14-yard run (Francisco Velez kick), 12:42
- Alabama – Derrick Henry 3-yard run (Adam Griffith kick), 5:27
- Alabama – Amari Cooper 4-yard pass from Jacob Coker (Adam Griffith kick), 0:21

Fourth Quarter

- Alabama – Amari Cooper 6-yard pass from Blake Sims (Adam Griffith kick), 10:10

Passing

- FLA – Jeff Driskel – 9/28, 93 yards, 1 touchdown, 2 interceptions
- ALA – Blake Sims – 23/33, 445 yards, 4 touchdowns

Rushing

- FLA – Jeff Driskel – 11 carries, 59 yards, 1 touchdown
- ALA – Derrick Henry – 20 carries, 111 yards, 1 touchdown

Receiving

- FLA – Clay Burton – 3 receptions, 33 yards
- ALA – Amari Cooper – 10 receptions, 201 yards, 3 touchdowns

Tackling

- FLA – Keanu Neal – 8 tackles, 1 fumble return
- ALA – Reggie Ragland – 6.5 tackles, 1 fumble recovery

Florida and Alabama played for the fourth time in six years, with this matchup being in Tuscaloosa. This is the most-played SEC Championship game as well, with Florida leading that series 4–3. However, Florida trailed the all-time series 14–23, with the last game being played in 2011 that resulted in a 38–10 Alabama win in Gainesville.

=== Tennessee ===
Florida Gators at Tennessee Volunteers – Game summary

Quarter	1	2	3	4	Total
Florida	0	0	0	10	10
Tennessee	0	3	6	0	9

at Neyland Stadium • Knoxville, Tennessee

- Date: October 4, 2014
- Game time: Noon
- Game weather: Temperature: 54 °F (12 °C) • Wind: WNW at 10 miles per hour (16 km/h) • Weather: sunny
- Game attendance: 102,455
- Referee: Hubert Owens
- TV announcers (SEC Network): Brent Musburger, Jesse Palmer, and Maria Taylor
- Boxscore

Game information

Second Quarter

- Tennessee – Aaron Medley 36-yard field goal, 13:23

Third Quarter

- Tennessee – Aaron Medley 38-yard field goal, 9:24
- Tennessee – Aaron Medley 39-yard field goal, 2:21

Fourth Quarter

- Florida – Matt Jones 2-yard run (Francisco Velez kick), 13:40
- Florida – Austin Hardin 49-yard field goal, 6:20

Passing

- FLA – Jeff Driskel – 11/23, 59 yards, 3 interceptions
- TEN – Justin Worley – 26/39, 205 yards, 2 interceptions

Rushing

- FLA – Matt Jones – 23 carries, 114 yards, 1 touchdown
- TEN – Jalen Hurd – 10 carries, 39 yards

Receiving

- FLA – Demarcus Robinson – 3 receptions, 30 yards
- TEN – Pig Howard – 6 receptions, 79 yards

Tackling

- FLA – Antonio Morrison – 11 tackles
- TEN – A. J. Johnson and Brian Randolph – 13 tackles

In their third SEC game of the 2014 season, Florida squared off against their bitter rival, the Tennessee Volunteers. Both teams have met annually since 1990 and the Volunteers trail the Gators in the all-time series 19–24 (.442), and have lost 9 straight to Florida. In last year's contest in Gainesville, Florida defeated Tennessee 31–17.

=== LSU ===
LSU Tigers at Florida Gators – Game summary

Quarter	1	2	3	4	Total
LSU	7	7	6	10	30
Florida	14	3	0	10	27

at Ben Hill Griffin Stadium • Gainesville, Florida

- Date: October 11, 2014
- Game time: 7:30 p.m.
- Game weather: Temperature: 80 °F (27 °C) • Wind: calm • Weather: 56% humidity
- Game attendance: 88,014
- Referee: Matt Austin
- TV announcers (SEC Network): Brent Musburger, Jesse Palmer, and Maria Taylor
- Boxscore

Game information

First Quarter

- Florida – Andre Debose 62-yard punt return (Francisco Velez kick), 8:52
- LSU – Leonard Fournette 12-yard run (Colby Delahoussaye kick), 6:21
- Florida – Jeff Driskel 9-yard run (Francisco Velez kick), 2:32

Second Quarter

- Florida – Francisco Velez 34-yard field goal, 11:07
- LSU – Kenny Hilliard 1-yard run (Colby Delahoussaye kick), 4:12

Third Quarter

- LSU – Leonard Fournette 2-yard run, 3:42

Fourth Quarter

- Florida – Demarcus Robinson 11-yard pass from Jeff Driskel (Francisco Velez kick), 6:10
- LSU – Travin Dural 11-yard pass from Anthony Jennings (Colby Delahoussaye kick), 2:40
- Florida – Francisco Velez 18-yard field goal, 1:49
- LSU – Colby Delahoussaye 50-yard field goal, 0:03

Passing

- LSU – Anthony Jennings – 10/21, 110 yards, 1 touchdown
- FLA – Jeff Driskel – 14/25, 183 yards, 1 touchdown, 2 interceptions

Rushing

- LSU – Leonard Fournette – 27 carries, 140 yards, 2 touchdowns
- FLA – Jeff Driskel – 21 carries, 71 yards, 1 touchdown

Receiving

- LSU – Travin Dural – 2 receptions, 52 yards, 1 touchdown
- FLA – Demarcus Robinson – 5 receptions, 104 yards, 1 touchdown

Tackling

- LSU – Kwon Alexander – 10 tackles
- FLA – Antonio Morrison – 14 tackles

Florida and LSU have been annual opponents since 1971, and forged a heated and evenly matched rivalry since. Florida leads the overall series 31–26–3. The longest winning streak in the series is held by Florida, with nine victories from 1988 to 1996. LSU's longest winning streak is four, from 1977 to 1980. Since 2001, LSU has a 3–3 record at the Swamp, while Florida is 3–3 at Tiger Stadium. Both the Gators and Tigers each won two national championships during that time period and boasted impressive home records against other opponents. In 2013, LSU beat Florida 17–6 in a defensive struggle at Tiger Stadium in Baton Rouge, the first of seven consecutive Gator losses on the year. Florida bested LSU 14–6 in the last matchup in Gainesville in 2012.

=== Missouri ===
Missouri Tigers at Florida Gators – Game summary

Quarter	1	2	3	4	Total
Missouri	14	6	22	0	42
Florida	0	0	7	6	13

at Ben Hill Griffin Stadium • Gainesville, Florida

- Date: October 18, 2014
- Game time: 7:00 p.m.
- Game weather: Temperature: 79 °F (26 °C) • Wind: calm • Weather: 52% humidity
- Game attendance: 89,117
- Referee: Matt Loeffler
- TV announcers (ESPN2): Joe Tessitore, Brock Huard, and Shannon Spake
- Boxscore

Game information

First Quarter

- Missouri – Marcus Murphy 96-yard kickoff return (Andrew Baggett kick), 14:49
- Missouri – Marcus Murphy 5-yard run (Andrew Baggett kick), 3:50

Second Quarter

- Missouri – Andrew Baggett 25-yard field goal, 8:38
- Missouri – Andrew Baggett 33-yard field goal, 4:21

Third Quarter

- Missouri – Marcus Murphy 82-yard punt return (Maty Mauk pass to Bud Sasser), 13:01
- Missouri – Markus Golden 21-yard fumble return (Andrew Baggett kick), 7:25
- Missouri – Darvin Ruise 46-yard interception return (Andrew Baggett kick), 5:57
- Florida – Teven Westbrook 5-yard pass from Treon Harris (Francisco Velez kick), 1:43

Fourth Quarter

- Florida – Treon Harris 3-yard run, 0:26

Passing

- Mizzou – Maty Mauk – 6/18, 20 yards, 1 interception
- FLA – Treon Harris – 8/12, 98 yards, 1 touchdown, 1 interception

Rushing

- Mizzou – Maty Mauk – 7 carries, 38 yards
- FLA – Kelvin Taylor – 12 carries, 56 yards

Receiving

- Mizzou – Darius White – 2 receptions, 9 yards
- FLA – Demarcus Robinson – 4 receptions, 48 yards

Tackling

- Mizzou – Kenya Dennis – 8 tackles
- FLA – Keanu Neal – 10 tackles

Florida and Missouri have only played one another 3 total times (1966, 2012, and 2013), but with Missouri joining the SEC Eastern Division in 2012, the two meet annually in both Gainesville and Columbia. 2012 saw Florida squeak by Missouri and earn a share of the SEC East title with a 14–7 win in Gainesville en route to an 11–2 final record. 2013 saw Missouri embarrass Florida (holding them scoreless in the fourth quarter) 36–17 in Columbia en route to an SEC Eastern Division crown and a Cotton Bowl win.

=== Georgia ===
Florida Gators vs. Georgia Bulldogs – Game summary

Quarter	1	2	3	4	Total
Florida	0	14	10	14	38
#9 Georgia	7	0	0	13	20

at EverBank Field • Jacksonville, Florida

- Date: November 1, 2014
- Game time: 3:30 p.m.
- Game weather: Temperature: 58 °F (14 °C) • Wind: NW at 22 miles per hour (35 km/h) • Weather: 41% humidity, sunny
- Game attendance: 83,004
- Referee: Hubert Owens
- TV announcers (CBS): Verne Lundquist, Gary Danielson, and Allie LaForce
- Boxscore

Game information

First Quarter

- Georgia – Nick Chubb 39-yard run (Marshall Morgan kick), 9:02

Second Quarter

- Florida – Michael McNeely 21-yard run (Francisco Velez kick), 8:25
- Florida – Kelvin Taylor 2-yard run (Francisco Velez kick), 5:06

Third Quarter

- Florida – Matt Jones 44-yard run (Francisco Velez kick), 12:07
- Florida – Francisco Velez 21-yard field goal, 5:09

Fourth Quarter

- Florida – Matt Jones 1-yard run (Francisco Velez kick), 13:49
- Georgia – Nick Chubb 10-yard pass from Hutson Mason, 11:06
- Florida – Kelvin Taylor 65-yard run (Francisco Velez kick), 2:11
- Georgia – Brendan Douglas 1-yard run (Marshall Morgan kick), 0:03

Passing

- FLA – Treon Harris – 3/6, 27 yards
- UGA – Hutson Mason – 26/42, 319 yards, 1 touchdown

Rushing

- FLA – Kelvin Taylor – 25 carries, 197 yards, 2 touchdowns
- UGA – Nick Chubb – 21 carries, 156 yards, 1 touchdown

Receiving

- FLA – Latroy Pittman – 1 reception, 13 yards
- UGA – Michael Bennett – 6 receptions, 60 yards

Tackling

- FLA – Antonio Morrison – 15 tackles
- UGA – Amarlo Herrera – 11 tackles

In one of only two SEC neutral site games, the Florida–Georgia rivalry is one of the most storied in SEC football. Held in Jacksonville, Florida since 1933 (minus 1994 and 1995) the rivalry attracts huge crowds to Jacksonville, and the associated tailgating and other events earned it the nickname of the "World's Largest Outdoor Cocktail Party." The designated home team alternates from year to year, with ticket distribution split evenly between the fans of the two teams. Georgia holds the overall series lead 49–40–2, and currently is riding a 3-game winning streak heading into this year's matchup. Current Florida head coach Will Muschamp (a former Georgia standout) is 0–7 in the rivalry, losing 4 games as a Georgia player and the last 3 games as Florida head coach. Due to much fan criticism and pressure, Coach Muschamp decided that Treon Harris, the much anticipated freshman, would replace Junior quarterback Jeff Driskel for his first start as a Gator vs the Bulldogs.

=== Vanderbilt ===
Florida Gators at Vanderbilt Commodores – Game summary

Quarter	1	2	3	4	Total
Florida	7	10	0	17	34
Vanderbilt	7	0	0	3	10

at Vanderbilt Stadium • Nashville, Tennessee

- Date: November 8, 2014
- Game time: 7:30 p.m.
- Game weather: Temperature: 51 °F (11 °C) • Wind: W at 3 miles per hour (4.8 km/h) • Weather: cloudy
- Game attendance: 35,191
- Referee: Penn Wagers
- TV announcers (SEC Network): Dave Neal, Andre Ware, and Laura Rutledge
- Boxscore

Game information

First Quarter

- Vanderbilt – Steven Scheu 33-yard pass from Johnny McCrary (Tommy Openshaw kick), 7:41
- Florida – Kelvin Taylor 13-yard run (Francisco Velez kick), 3:34

Second Quarter

- Florida – Jeff Driskel 1-yard run (Francisco Velez kick), 8:38
- Florida – Francisco Velez 40-yard field goal, 4:02

Fourth Quarter

- Florida – Treon Harris 7-yard run (Francisco Velez kick), 14:51
- Vanderbilt – Tommy Openshaw 48-yard field goal, 13:17
- Florida – Treon Harris 33-yard run (Francisco Velez kick), 10:41
- Florida – Francisco Velez 25-yard field goal, 8:29

Passing

- FLA – Treon Harris – 13/21, 215 yards
- VAN – Johnny McCrary – 14/35, 160 yards, 1 touchdown, 2 interceptions

Rushing

- FLA – Matt Jones – 17 carries, 82 yards
- VAN – Ralph Webb – 16 carries, 83 yards

Receiving

- FLA – Quinton Dunbar – 4 receptions, 97 yards
- VAN – Davis Dudchock – 5 receptions, 83 yards

Tackling

- FLA – Marcus Maye – 6 tackles
- VAN – Zach Cunningham – 11 tackles

In one of the more lopsided series in the SEC, Florida travels to Vanderbilt following a rare loss to the Commodores in Gainesville 17–34 in 2013. The win for the Commodores at Florida was the first since 1945. The Commodores snapped a 22-game losing streak to the Gators, and was just the Commodores' 10th win in 47 meetings against the Gators and their first in the series since 1988. Florida leads the overall series with Vanderbilt 35–10–2, and defeated Vanderbilt on their last visit to Nashville in 2012 by a score of 31–17.

=== South Carolina ===
South Carolina Gamecocks at Florida Gators – Game summary

Quarter	1	2	3	4	OT	Total
South Carolina	10	0	0	7	6	23
Florida	0	10	7	0	3	20

at Ben Hill Griffin Stadium • Gainesville, Florida

- Date: November 15, 2014
- Game time: Noon
- Game weather: Temperature: 68 °F (20 °C) • Wind: N at 10 miles per hour (16 km/h) • Weather: 61% humidity, sunny
- Game attendance: 85,088
- Referee: David Smith
- TV announcers (SEC Network): Dave Neal, Andre Ware, and Laura Rutledge
- Boxscore

Game information

First Quarter

- South carolina – Brandon Wilds 20-yard run (Elliott Fry kick), 12:00
- South carolina – Elliott Fry 31-yard field goal, 2:15

Second Quarter

- Florida – Francisco Velez 34-yard field goal, 6;37
- Florida – Demarcus Robinson 11-yard pass from Treon Harris (Francisco Velez kick), 0:24

Third Quarter

- Florida – Matt Jones 1-yard run (Francisco Velez kick), 1:56

Fourth Quarter

- South carolina – Mike Davis 0-yard fumble recovery (Elliott Fry kick), 0:12

Overtime

- Florida – Austin Hardin 35-yard field goal
- South carolina – Dylan Thompson 4-yard run

Passing

- SCAR – Dylan Thompson – 22/41, 206 yards
- FLA – Treon Harris – 5/11, 60 yards, 1 touchdown

Rushing

- SCAR – Mike Davis – 15 carries, 56 yards, 1 touchdown
- FLA – Treon Harris – 20 carries, 111 yards

Receiving

- SCAR – Pharoh Cooper – 4 receptions, 40 yards
- FLA – Latroy Pittman, Jr. – 1 reception, 32 yards

Tackling

- SCAR – Jonathan Walton and Skai Moore – 12 tackles
- FLA – Antonio Morrison – 16 tackles

Florida and South Carolina have been divisional rivals since 1992, and the Gators holds a dominating 24–7–3 series lead against the Gamecocks. However, the series has been far more evenly matched since the arrival of former Gators Heisman Trophy winning quarterback and former head coach Steve Spurrier as South Carolina Head Coach in 2005. Previously, South Carolina had not defeated Florida since joining the SEC in 1992 before Spurrier's arrival, but has been only a slim 5–4 Florida advantage since. 2013 found Florida narrowly lose 14–19 to South Carolina late in the 4th quarter in a night time match-up at Williams–Brice Stadium in Columbia. During their last visit to Gainesville, South Carolina was dominated on both sides of the ball in a 44–11 Gators rout. This will be the final Southeastern Conference game of the season for both teams. After the game Coach Muschamp was fired and DJ Durkin became the interim coach for the rest of the season.

=== Eastern Kentucky ===
Eastern Kentucky Colonels at Florida Gators – Game summary

Quarter	1	2	3	4	Total
Eastern Kentucky	3	0	0	0	3
Florida	17	14	7	14	52

at Ben Hill Griffin Stadium • Gainesville, Florida

- Date: November 22, 2014
- Game time: Noon
- Game weather: Temperature: 69 °F (21 °C) • Wind: E at 10 miles per hour (16 km/h) • Weather: 74% humidity, light rain
- Game attendance: 83,399
- Referee: James Carter
- TV announcers (SEC Network): Allen Bestwick, Chris Doering, and Kayce Smith
- Boxscore

Game information

First Quarter

- Florida – Austin Hardin 48-yard field goal, 12:08
- Florida – Kelvin Taylor 13-yard run (Austin Hardin kick), 8:35
- Eastern kentucky – Andrew Lloyd 51-yard field goal, 0:55
- Florida – Quinton Dunbar 70-yard pass from Treon Harris (Austin Hardin kick), 0:33

Second Quarter

- Florida – Demarcus Robinson 19-yard pass from Treon Harris (Austin Hardin kick), 8:29
- Florida – Jeff Driskel 1-yard run (Austin Hardin kick), 4:40

Third Quarter

- Florida – Demarcus Robinson 38-yard pass from Jeff Driskel (Austin Hardin kick), 6:10

Fourth Quarter

- Florida – Quinton Dunbar 29-yard pass from Jeff Driskel (Francisco Velez kick), 14:53
- Florida – Michael McNeely 28-yard pass from Jeff Driskel (Francisco Velez kick), 6:18

Passing

- EKU – Bennie Coney – 8/19, 43 yards
- FLA – Jeff Driskel – 9/11, 164 yards, 3 touchdowns

Rushing

- EKU – Jared Sanders – 2 carries, 25 yards
- FLA – Adam Lane – 5 carries, 60 yards

Receiving

- EKU – Jeff Glover – 2 receptions, 30 yards
- FLA – Demarcus Robinson – 4 receptions, 137 yards

Tackling

- EKU – Brandon Stanley, Chris Kelly, and Tyrelle Johnson – 7 tackles
- FLA – Michael Taylor – 9 tackles

Florida closes out the 2014 home season and celebrates Senior Day against FCS opponent Eastern Kentucky. Gators coach Will Muschamp was Eastern Kentucky's secondary coach in 1999 in his second season as a full-time assistant coach. This will be the first meeting between the two teams.

=== Florida State ===
Florida Gators at Florida State Seminoles – Game summary

Quarter	1	2	3	4	Total
Florida	9	7	3	0	19
#1 Florida State	7	14	0	3	24

at Doak Campbell Stadium • Tallahassee, Florida

- Date: November 29, 2014
- Game time: 3:30 p.m.
- Game weather: Temperature: 67 °F (19 °C) • Wind: NE at 5 miles per hour (8.0 km/h) • Weather: 0% rain, clear skies
- Game attendance: 82,485
- Referee: Jeff Flanagan
- TV announcers (ESPN): Chris Fowler, Kirk Herbstreit, and Heather Cox
- Boxscore

Game information

First Quarter

- Florida – Austin Hardin 52-yard field goal, 12:37
- Florida – Austin Hardin 39-yard field goal, 7:25
- Florida – Austin Hardin 43-yard field goal, 2:15
- Florida state – Terrance Smith 94-yard interception return (Roberto Aguayo kick), 1:12

Second Quarter

- Florida state – Nick O'Leary 10-yard pass from Jameis Winston (Roberto Aguayo kick), 8:12
- Florida state – Nick O'Leary 6-yard pass from James Winston (Roberto Aguayo kick), 2:14
- Florida – Clay Burton 15-yard pass from Treon Harris (Austin Hardin kick), 0:47

Third Quarter

- Florida – Austin Hardin 32-yard field goal, 10:16

Fourth Quarter

- Florida state – Roberto Aguayo 37-yard field goal, 3:23

Passing

- FLA – Treon Harris – 13/32, 169 yards, 1 touchdown, 2 interceptions
- FSU – Jameis Winston – 12/24, 125 yards, 2 touchdowns, 4 interceptions

Rushing

- FLA – Treon Harris – 9 carries, 41 yards
- FSU – Dalvin Cook – 24 carries, 144 yards

Receiving

- FLA – Demarcus Robinson – 4 receptions, 71 yards
- FSU – Nick O'Leary – 4 receptions, 52 yards, 2 touchdowns

Tackling

- FLA – Jabari Gorman – 9 tackles, 1 interception
- FSU – Reggie Northrup – 11 tackles

In one of the most intense, heated, and emotional rivalries in all of college football, Florida and Florida State ended each of their respective regular seasons against one another in Tallahassee on FSU Senior Day. 2013 found both teams on opposite sides of the coin. FSU went on to an undefeated 14–0 season and were crowned BCS National Champions, while Florida limped to a 4–8 record that included a seven-game losing skid to end the season. Florida holds a 34–22–2 advantage in the series, a 7–3 record since 2004, and has a 4–1 record at Florida State since 2004. Florida State won the most recent match up 37–7 behind eventual Heisman Trophy winner Jameis Winston in Gainesville, while Florida held serve in 2012 by defeating Florida State in Tallahassee 37–26 behind senior running back Mike Gillislee.

=== East Carolina ===
East Carolina Pirates vs. Florida Gators – Game summary

Quarter	1	2	3	4	Total
East Carolina	7	0	10	3	20
Florida	7	14	7	0	28

at Legion Field • Birmingham, Alabama

- Date: January 3, 2015
- Game time: Noon
- Game weather: Temperature: 55 °F (13 °C) • Wind: SE at 10 miles per hour (16 km/h) • Weather: Chance of rain
- Game attendance: 30,083
- Referee: Dan Romeo
- TV announcers (ESPN/ESPN Radio): Dave Neal, Andre Ware, and Laura Rutledge/Adam Amin, Greg McElroy, and Cara Capuano
- Boxscore

Game information

First Quarter

- East carolina – Justin Hardy 3-yard pass from Shane Carden (Warren Harvey kick), 7:06
- Florida – Brian Poole 29-yard interception return (Austin Hardin kick), 3:09

Second Quarter

- Florida – Adam Lane 2-yard run (Austin Hardin kick), 14:56
- Florida – Brandon Powell 13-yard pass from Treon Harris (Austin Hardin kick), 6:23

Third Quarter

- East carolina – Cam Worthy 4-yard pass from Shane Carden (Warren Harvey kick), 12:51
- Florida – Ahmad Fulwood 86-yard pass from Treon Harris (Austin Hardin kick), 11:20
- East carolina – Warren Harvey 24-yard field goal, 6:10

Fourth Quarter

- East carolina – Warren Harvey 24-yard field goal, 11:55

Passing

- ECU – Shane Carden – 34/66, 427 yards, 2 touchdowns, 2 interceptions
- FLA – Treon Harris – 5/11, 123 yards, 2 touchdowns, 1 interception

Rushing

- ECU – Chris Hairston – 17 carries, 73 yards
- FLA – Adam Lane – 16 carries, 109 yards, 1 touchdown

Receiving

- ECU – Justin Hardy – 11 receptions, 160 yards, 1 touchdown
- FLA – Ahmad Fulwood – 1 reception, 86 yards, 1 touchdown

Tackling

- ECU – Brandon Williams – 11 tackles
- FLA – Keanu Neal – 8 tackles

This was only the second meeting between the schools. Their previous meeting came in 1983, a 24-17 Gator victory. The teams faced each other again in Florida's second game of the 2015 season.

== Personnel ==
Following the low offensive production of the 2013 season, head coach Will Muschamp released offensive coordinator Brent Pease and offensive line coach Tim Davis. Muschamp replaced Pease with Kurt Roper, who led the Duke Blue Devils to their 1st 10-win season, the ACC title game, and the Chick-fil-A Bowl in 2013. Muschamp also replaced Davis with Mike Summers, and hired Coleman Hutzler as the new special teams coach.

== Roster ==
2014 Florida Gators roster
Quarterbacks: 3 Treon Harris – freshman; 6 Jeff Driskel – (redshirt) junior; 7 Will Grier – freshman; 8 Skyler Mornhinweg – (redshirt) sophomore; 9 Jacob Guy – (redshirt) sophomore; 13 Christian Provancha – (redshirt) senior; 19 Ryan McGriff – (redshirt) junior; Running backs: 15 Brandon Powell – freshman; 20 Darius Masline – (redshirt) sophomore; 21 Kelvin Taylor – sophomore; 22 Adam Lane – (redshirt) freshman; 24 Matt Jones – junior; 33 Mack Brown – (redshirt) senior; 37 Mark Herndon – junior; 49 A.J. Mobley – (redshirt) senior (FB); Wide receivers: 1 Quinton Dunbar – (redshirt) senior; 2 Ryan Sousa – freshman; 4 Andre Debose – (redshirt) senior; 5 Ahmad Fulwood – sophomore; 9 Latroy Pittman Jr. – junior; 10 Valdez Showers – (redshirt) junior; 11 Demarcus Robinson – sophomore; 14 C.J. Worton – freshman; 15 Ryan Parrish – (redshirt) senior; 18 Roger Dixon – junior; 31 Michael McNeely – (redshirt) senior; 32 D.L. Powell – (redshirt) freshman; 81 Case Harrison – (redshirt) freshman; 85 Chris Thompson – sophomore; 86 Raphael Andrades – junior; 89 Alvin Bailey – (redshirt) freshman; Tight ends: 25 Gideon Ajagbe – (redshirt) senior; 30 DeAndre Goolsby – freshman; 39 Ryan Ferguson – freshman; 41 Hunter Joyer – senior; 80 C'yontai Lewis – freshman; 82 Bair Diamond – (redshirt) sophomore; 82 Moral Stephens – freshman; 83 Jake McGee – (redshirt) senior; 87 Tevin Westbrook – senior; 88 Clay Burton – senior	Offensive line: 51 Antonio Riles – (redshirt) freshman; 52 Travaris Dorsey – freshman; 53 Kavaris Harkless – freshman; 54 Cameron Dillard – (redshirt) freshman; 55 Roderick Johnson – (redshirt) freshman; 60 Zach Shinn – freshman; 63 Trip Thurman – (redshirt) junior; 69 Nick Davis – (redshirt) freshman; 70 D. J. Humphries – junior; 71 Nolan Kelleher – freshman; 72 Drew Sarvary – junior; 73 Tyler Moore – (redshirt) junior; 74 Trenton Brown – senior; 75 Chaz Green – (redshirt) senior; 76 Max Garcia – (redshirt) senior; 77 Andrew Mike – freshman; 78 David Sharpe – freshman; 79 Matthew Fuchs – (redshirt) sophomore; Defensive line: 6 Dante Fowler – junior; 8 Leon Orr – (redshirt) senior; 14 Alex McCalister – (redshirt) sophomore; 18 Justus Reed – freshman; 17 Jordan Sherit – (redshirt) freshman; 54 Khairi Clark – freshman; 55 Darious Cummings – senior; 56 Thomas Holley – freshman; 57 Caleb Brantley – (redshirt) freshman; 59 Dakota Wilson – (redshirt) junior; 90 Jonathan Bullard – junior; 91 Joey Ivie – sophomore; 92 Gerald Willis – freshman; 93 Taven Bryan – freshman; 94 Bryan Cox Jr. – (redshirt) sophomore; 99 Jay-nard Bostwick – (redshirt) freshman	Linebackers: 3 Antonio Morrison – junior; 9 Matt Rolin – (redshirt) freshman; 11 Neiron Ball – (redshirt) senior; 13 Daniel McMillian – sophomore; 28 Jeremi Powell – (redshirt) sophomore; 34 Alex Anzalone – sophomore; 40 Jarrad Davis – sophomore; 45 R. J. Raymond – freshman; 46 LeAndre Rembert – (redshirt) freshman; 51 Michael Taylor – (redshirt) senior; 52 Steven Stipe – (redshirt) freshman; 56 Andre Palmer – (redshirt) freshman; Defensive backs: 1 Vernon Hargreaves – sophomore; 2 Jabari Gorman – senior; 5 Jalen Tabor – freshman; 7 Duke Dawson – freshman; 12 Quincy Wilson – freshman; 20 Marcus Maye – (redshirt) sophomore; 21 Deiondre Porter – freshman; 22 Nick Washington – (redshirt) freshman; 23 J. C. Jackson – freshman; 24 Brian Poole – junior; 25 Garrett Stephens – (redshirt) freshman; 26 Marcell Harris – (redshirt) freshman; 27 Ben Peacock – (redshirt) junior; 29 Evan Schroeder – (redshirt) junior; 35 Michael Iorio – (redshirt) freshman; 36 Eddie Giles – freshman; 38 Kerollin Francois – (redshirt) freshman; 42 Keanu Neal – sophomore; Placekickers: 16 Austin Hardin – (redshirt) sophomore; 95 Francisco Velez – (redshirt) senior; 97 Brooks Abbott – (redshirt) sophomore; 98 Jorge Powell – freshman; Punters: 4 Kyle Christy – senior; 19 Johnny Townsend – sophomore; Long snappers: 43 Kyle Crofoot – (redshirt) junior; 46 Drew Ferris – (redshirt) senior

== Coaching staff ==
Name	Current Responsibilities	Joined Staff
Will Muschamp	Head Coach	2011
Coleman Hutzler	Special teams	2014
Brad Lawing	Assistant Head Coach/Defensive line	2013
Kurt Roper	Offensive coordinator/quarterbacks	2014
D. J. Durkin	Defensive coordinator/Linebackers	2010
Chris Leak	Wide Receivers	2014
Mike Summers	Offensive line	2014
Travaris Robinson	Defensive Backs	2011
Brian White	Running Backs	2009
Derek Lewis	Tight Ends	2011

== Postseason awards ==
=== Coaches All-SEC ===
All-SEC First Team:

-Vernon Hargreaves (CB)

All-SEC Second Team:

-Antonio Morrison (LB)

Freshman All-SEC Team:

-Treon Harris (QB)

-Jalen Tabor (CB)

=== AP All-America ===
- All-America Second Team: Vernon Hargreaves III

== Players drafted into the NFL ==
Round	Pick	Player	Position	NFL Club
1	3	Dante Fowler	DE	Jacksonville Jaguars
1	24	D. J. Humphries	OT	Arizona Cardinals
3	91	Chaz Green	OT	Dallas Cowboys
3	95	Matt Jones	RB	Washington Redskins
4	133	Max Garcia	C	Denver Broncos
5	161	Neiron Ball	LB	Oakland Raiders
7	221	Andre Debose	WR	Oakland Raiders
7	244	Trenton Brown	OT	San Francisco 49ers
