= Demarcus Robinson =

American football player (born 1994)

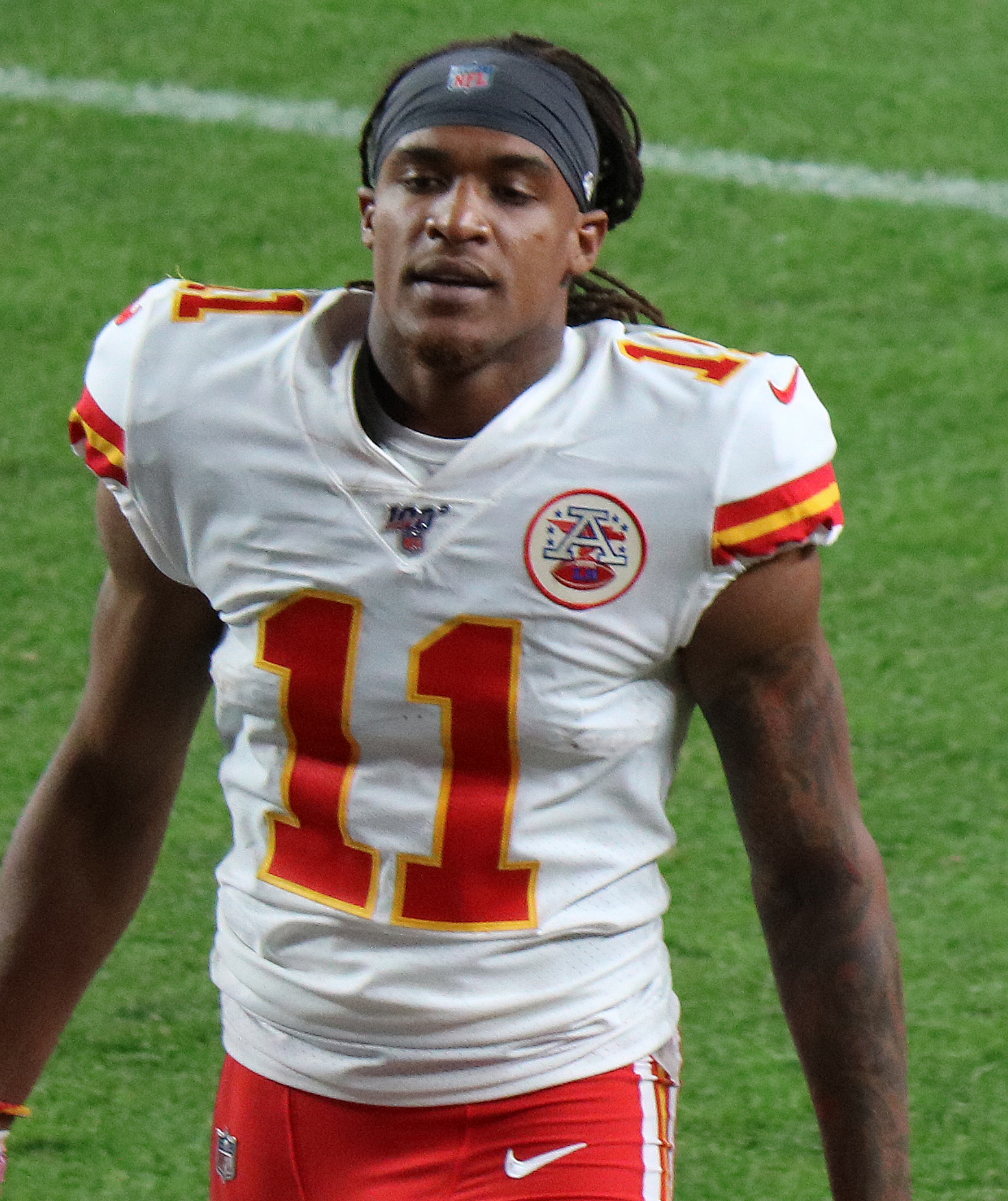
- Robinson with the Kansas City Chiefs in 2019

No. 11 – San Francisco 49ers
- Position: Wide receiver
- Roster status: Active

Personal information
- Born: September 21, 1994 (age 32); Fort Valley, Georgia, U.S.
- Listed height: 6 ft 1 in (1.85 m)
- Listed weight: 202 lb (92 kg)

Career information
- High school: Peach County (Fort Valley)
- College: Florida (2013–2015)
- NFL draft: 2016: 4th round, 126th overall pick

Career history
- Kansas City Chiefs (2016–2021); Las Vegas Raiders (2022)*; Baltimore Ravens (2022); Los Angeles Rams (2023–2024); San Francisco 49ers (2025–present)
- * Offseason or practice squad member only

Awards and highlights
- Super Bowl champion (LIV)

Career NFL statistics as of Week 10, 2026
- Receptions: 280
- Receiving yards: 3,395
- Receiving touchdowns: 29
- Stats at Pro Football Reference

Demarcus Dontavian Robinson (born September 21, 1994) is an American professional football wide receiver for the San Francisco 49ers of the National Football League (NFL). He played college football for the Florida Gators and was selected by the Kansas City Chiefs in the fourth round of the 2016 NFL draft. Robinson won Super Bowl LIV with the Chiefs and has also been a member of the Las Vegas Raiders, Baltimore Ravens, and Los Angeles Rams.

== Early life ==
Robinson attended and played high school football at Peach County High School in Georgia.

== College career ==
Robinson played his collegiate career at Florida from 2013–2015. He played minimally as a freshman in 2013 and finished the season with five receptions for 23 yards in seven games. Robinson was suspended twice during his freshman season after failing multiple tests for marijuana.

In 2014, Robinson had his breakout season and started 11 of 12 games. He was suspended for their season-opener against Idaho, which was eventually canceled due to weather, after failing another drug test for marijuana. Robinson finished the season with 53 receptions for 810 yards and seven touchdowns.

Robinson led the Gators as a junior in 2015 with 48 receptions and 522 yards and two touchdowns in 13 games and nine starts. On November 28, 2015, head coach Jim McElwain suspended Robinson right before their 27–2 loss to Florida State. The suspension was due to a violation of NCAA and team rules. It was reported the violation was due to Robinson's meeting with a marketing official and it marked his fourth suspension in three years with Florida.

On December 21, 2015, McElwain announced that Robinson and teammate Kelvin Taylor would forgo their senior season and enter the 2016 NFL draft. When asked about the early departures, McElwain commented, "I really don't get it." Both players were not regarded as first or second round picks and most experts saw their early entries as gambles.

== Professional career ==
=== Pre-draft ===
Robinson was one of 43 collegiate wide receivers to attend the NFL Scouting Combine in Indianapolis, Indiana. He performed all of the required combine drills and finished 26th among wide receivers in the 40-yard dash. On March 22, 2016, Robinson opted to attend Florida's pro day, along with Keanu Neal, Vernon Hargreaves, Jonathan Bullard, Jake McGee, Brian Poole, Kelvin Taylor, Alex McCalister, Antonio Morrison, and six other teammates. He chose to run all of the combine drills again and put up similar numbers from the combine. Scouts and team representatives from all 32 NFL teams attended, including Pittsburgh Steelers general manager Kevin Colbert, to scout Robinson as he performed positional drills. During the draft process, Robinson had private meetings and workouts with multiple teams, that Included the Philadelphia Eagles, Kansas City Chiefs, Oakland Raiders, and New York Jets. At the conclusion of the pre-draft process, Robinson was projected to be a fifth to seventh round draft pick by NFL draft experts and scouts.

Pre-draft measurables
Height	Weight	Arm length	Hand span	Wingspan	40-yard dash	10-yard split	20-yard split	20-yard shuttle	Three-cone drill	Vertical jump	Broad jump	Bench press
6 ft 1 3/8 in (1.86 m)	203 lb (92 kg)	33 in (0.84 m)	9 1/2 in (0.24 m)	6 ft 6 3/4 in (2.00 m)	4.59 s	1.59 s	2.68 s	4.19 s	6.69 s	34.5 in (0.88 m)	10 ft 3 in (3.12 m)	9 reps
All values from NFL Combine/Pro Day

=== Kansas City Chiefs ===
==== 2016 ====
The Chiefs selected Robinson in the fourth round (126th overall) of the 2016 NFL draft. He was the 14th wide receiver selected in 2016. On May 6, 2016, the Chiefs signed Robinson to a four-year, $2.85 million contract that includes a signing bonus of $517,172.

Throughout training camp, Robinson competed against Seantavius Jones, Mike Williams, Da'Ron Brown, Tyreek Hill, Mitch Mathews, and Kashif Moore for a backup wide receiver role. Head coach Andy Reid named him the fourth wide receiver on the depth chart to start the season, behind Jeremy Maclin, Albert Wilson, and Chris Conley.

Robinson made his professional regular season debut in the season-opening 33–27 victory over the San Diego Chargers. Robinson played in all 16 games as a rookie, but made no starts and mainly appeared on special teams while finishing with no statistics. The Chiefs finished the 2016 season atop the AFC West with a 12–4 record and qualified for the playoffs as the #2-seed. In the Divisional Round against the Pittsburgh Steelers, Robinson appeared in his first career postseason game and recorded no statistics during the narrow 18–16 loss.

==== 2017 ====
The Chiefs opted to release wide receiver Jeremy Maclin during training camp and held an open competition for his vacant starting wide receiver role. Robinson competed against Chris Conley, Tyreek Hill, De'Anthony Thomas, Albert Wilson, and Kenny Cook. He was named the fifth wide receiver on the depth chart behind Conley, Hill, Wilson, and Thomas.

During a Week 3 24–10 road victory over the Los Angeles Chargers, Robinson caught two passes for nine yards. He made his first career reception on a two-yard pass from quarterback Alex Smith before being tackled by cornerback Desmond King in the third quarter. Three weeks later against the Steelers, Robinson earned his first career start after Albert Wilson suffered a knee injury and Chris Conley was placed on injured reserve with a ruptured Achilles. Robinson finished the 19–13 loss with a 16-yard reception. In the next game against the Oakland Raiders on Thursday Night Football, he made his second consecutive start and caught a season-high five passes for 69 yards during the narrow 31–30 road loss. During the regular-season finale against the Denver Broncos, Robinson made his eighth start of the season, replacing Tyreek Hill who was inactive after suffering a death in his family. Robinson finished the 27–24 road victory with four receptions for 31 yards.

Robinson finished his second professional season with 21 receptions for 212 yards in 16 games and eight starts. The Chiefs finished the 2017 season atop the AFC West with a 10–6 record and qualified for the playoffs as the #4-seed. During the Wild Card Round against to the Tennessee Titans, Robinson made his first career postseason start and caught four passes for 57 yards and his first NFL touchdown on a 14-yard reception from Alex Smith in the second quarter of the narrow 22–21 loss.

==== 2018 ====
During Week 2 against the Steelers, Robinson caught his first touchdown of the season on a three-yard pass from Patrick Mahomes in the 42–37 road victory. During a narrow Week 15 29–28 loss to the Chargers on Thursday Night Football, Robinson had two receptions for seven yards and a touchdown. In the next game against the Seattle Seahawks, he recorded two receptions for 17 yards and a touchdown during the 38–31 road loss. During the regular season finale against the Raiders, Robinson caught an 89-yard touchdown, which was Mahomes' 50th touchdown pass of the season, in the 35–3 blowout victory.

Robinson finished the 2018 season with 22 receptions for 288 yards and four touchdowns in 16 games and five starts. The Chiefs finished the 2018 season atop the AFC West with a 12–4 record and qualified for the playoffs as the #1-seed. During the AFC Championship Game against the New England Patriots, Robinson had a 27-yard reception in the 37–31 overtime loss.

==== 2019 ====
During a Week 2 28–10 road victory over the Raiders, Robinson was the leading receiver with six receptions for 172 yards and two touchdowns. In the next game against the Baltimore Ravens, he recorded three receptions for 43 yards and a touchdown in the 33–28 victory. During the regular-season finale against the Chargers, Robinson had a 24-yard touchdown reception in the 31–21 victory.

Robinson finished the 2019 season with 32 receptions for 449 yards and four touchdowns in 16 games and 10 starts. The Chiefs finished atop the AFC West with a 12–4 record and qualified for the playoffs as the #2-seed. In the Divisional Round against the Houston Texans, Robinson recorded a four-yard reception during the 51–31 comeback victory. During the AFC Championship Game against the Titans, he caught two passes for 31 yards in the 35–24 victory as the Chiefs advanced to Super Bowl LIV. In the Super Bowl against the San Francisco 49ers, Robinson contributed on offense and special teams in the game but did not record a target or catch during the 31–20 victory.

==== 2020 ====
On April 8, 2020, Robinson re-signed with the Chiefs on a one-year deal.

During a Week 6 26–17 road victory over the Buffalo Bills on Monday Night Football, Robinson was the leading receiver with five receptions for 69 yards. Two weeks later against the New York Jets, he had four receptions for 63 yards and a touchdown in the 35–9 victory. In the next game against the Carolina Panthers, Robinson caught three passes for 34 yards and a touchdown during the narrow 33–31 victory. During Week 16 against the Atlanta Falcons, Robinson recorded two receptions for 29 yards and a touchdown in the 17–14 victory.

Robinson finished the 2020 season with 45 receptions for 466 yards and three touchdowns in 16 games and nine starts. The Chiefs finished the 2020 season atop the AFC West with a 14–2 record and qualified for the playoffs as the #1-seed. In the Divisional Round against the Cleveland Browns, Robinson had a 14-yard reception during the 22–17 victory. Robinson was placed on the reserve/COVID-19 list on February 1, 2021, but was activated four days later. He played in Super Bowl LV, recording an 11-yard reception during the 31–9 loss to the Tampa Bay Buccaneers.

==== 2021 ====
On March 25, 2021, the Chiefs re-signed Robinson to another one-year contract.

During Week 2 against the Ravens, Robinson recorded three receptions for 46 yards and a touchdown in the narrow 36–35 road loss. Three weeks later against the Washington Football Team, he once again had three receptions for 46 yards and a touchdown in the 31–13 road victory. During a Week 17 34–31 road loss to the Cincinnati Bengals, Robinson caught two passes for 33 yards and a touchdown.

Robinson finished the 2021 season with 25 receptions for 264 yards and three touchdowns in 17 games and 10 starts. The Chiefs finished atop the AFC West with a 12–5 record and qualified for the playoffs as the #2-seed. During the Wild Card Round against the Steelers, Robinson had four receptions for 76 yards in the 42–21 victory.

=== Las Vegas Raiders ===
On March 22, 2022, Robinson signed a one-year deal with the Las Vegas Raiders. He was released on August 16.

=== Baltimore Ravens ===
Robinson signed a one-year deal with the Baltimore Ravens on August 23, 2022.

Robinson made his Ravens debut during the season-opener against the Jets and finished the 24–9 road victory with two receptions for 19 yards. In the next game against the Miami Dolphins, Robinson had a 12-yard touchdown reception during the 42–38 loss. During a Week 11 13–3 victory over the Panthers, he recorded a career-high nine receptions for 128 yards. During Week 16 against the Falcons, Robinson had a six-yard touchdown reception in the 17–9 victory.

Robinson finished the 2022 season with a career-high 48 receptions for 458 yards and two touchdowns in 17 games and five starts. The Ravens finished second in the AFC North with a 10–7 record and qualified for the playoffs as the #6-seed. During the Wild Card Round against the Bengals, Robinson caught two passes for 49 yards and a touchdown in the 24–17 road loss.

=== Los Angeles Rams ===
==== 2023 ====
On June 12, 2023, Robinson signed a one-year contract with the Los Angeles Rams.

Robinson made his Rams debut during the season-opening 30–13 road victory over the Seahawks, but recorded no statistics. Robinson did not play in Week 5 against the Philadelphia Eagles as a healthy scratch. During Week 13 against the Browns, he had four receptions for 55 yards and his first touchdown of the season in the 36–19 victory. In the next game against his former team, the Ravens, Robinson caught three passes for 46 yards and a touchdown during the 37–31 overtime road loss. The following week against the Washington Commanders, he recorded two receptions for 44 yards and a touchdown to go along with a 23-yard carry in the 28–20 victory.

During Week 16 against the New Orleans Saints on Thursday Night Football, Robinson recorded six receptions for 82 yards and a touchdown in the 30–22 victory. In the next game against the New York Giants, he had six receptions for a season-high 92 yards during the 26–25 road victory.

Robinson finished the 2023 season with 26 receptions for 371 yards and four touchdowns in 16 games and four games. The Rams finished second in the NFC West with a 10–7 record and qualified for the playoffs as the #6-seed. During the Wild Card Round against the Detroit Lions, Robinson caught three passes for 44 yards in the narrow 24–23 road loss.

==== 2024 ====
On February 23, 2024, Robinson re-signed with the Rams on a one-year deal reportedly worth $5 million.

During Week 5 against the Green Bay Packers, Robinson had three receptions for 28 yards and a touchdown in the 24–19 loss. Three weeks later against the Minnesota Vikings on Thursday Night Football, he caught two passes for 35 yards, both for touchdowns, in the 30–20 victory. In the next game against the Seahawks, Robinson recorded season-highs with six receptions for 94 yards and two touchdowns, including the game-winner, during the 26–20 road victory.

During a Week 12 37–20 loss to the Eagles on Sunday Night Football, Robinson caught two passes for 15 yards and a touchdown. Hours after the loss, he was arrested for driving faster than 100 miles per hour (160 km/h) on the freeway and had "objective signs and symptoms of alcohol impairment"; however, head coach Sean McVay later said that the team will not suspend Robinson and that he would play in the next game against the Saints. Robinson finished the 21–14 road victory with two receptions for 49 yards and a touchdown. The following week against the Bills, he suffered an AC sprain shoulder injury in the narrow 44–42 victory.

Robinson finished the 2024 season with 31 receptions for a career-high 505 yards and a career-high seven touchdowns in 17 games and starts. The Rams finished atop the NFC West with a 10–7 record and qualified for the playoffs as the #4-seed. During the Wild Card Round against the Vikings, Robinson had a 23-yard reception in the 27–9 victory. In the Divisional Round against the Eagles, he recorded three receptions for 74 yards in the 28–22 loss.

On January 9, 2025, it was reported that Robinson was arrested for a misdemeanor DUI in Los Angeles County, his second related accident while with the Rams.

=== San Francisco 49ers ===
==== 2025 ====
On March 13, 2025, Robinson signed with the San Francisco 49ers on a two-year, $9.5 million contract. He was suspended for the first three games of the season for violating the league's substance abuse policy.

Robinson made his 49ers debut in Week 4 against the Jacksonville Jaguars and finished the 26–21 loss with a 20-yard reception. During a Week 16 48–27 road victory over the Indianapolis Colts on Monday Night Football, Robinson recorded two receptions for 23 yards and his only touchdown of the regular season.

Robinson finished the 2025 season with 22 receptions for 276 yards and a touchdown in 14 games and two starts. The 49ers finished third in the NFC West with a 12–5 record and qualified for the playoffs as the #6-seed. During the Wild Card Round against the Eagles, Robinson had six receptions for 111 yards and a touchdown in the 23–19 road victory.

==== 2026 ====
During the season-opening 27–7 victory over his former team, the Rams, in Australia on Thursday Night Football, Robinson had two receptions for 50 yards and a touchdown. In the next game against the Dolphins, he recorded three receptions for 34 yards before leaving the eventual 35–13 victory during the second quarter with a high ankle sprain. On November 7, Robinson was activated from the injured reserve.

== Career statistics ==
=== NFL ===
Legend
	Won the Super Bowl
**Bold**	Career high

==== Regular season ====
Year	Team	Games		Receiving					Rushing					Fumbles	
Year	Team	GP	GS	Rec	Yds	Avg	Lng	TD	Att	Yds	Avg	Lng	TD	Fum	Lost
2016	KC	16	0	0	0	0.0	0	0	0	0	0.0	0	0	0	0
2017	KC	16	8	21	212	10.1	33	0	0	0	0.0	0	0	0	0
2018	KC	16	5	22	288	13.1	**89T**	4	0	0	0.0	0	0	0	0
2019	KC	16	10	32	449	14.0	44T	4	0	0	0.0	0	0	0	0
2020	KC	16	9	45	466	10.4	28	3	0	0	0.0	0	0	**2**	**1**
2021	KC	**17**	10	25	264	10.6	33T	3	0	0	0.0	0	0	0	0
2022	BAL	**17**	5	**48**	458	9.5	31	2	0	0	0.0	0	0	**2**	**1**
2023	LAR	16	4	26	371	14.3	46	4	**1**	**23**	**23.0**	**23**	0	**2**	**1**
2024	LAR	**17**	**17**	31	**505**	**16.3**	37	**7**	0	0	0.0	0	0	0	0
2025	SF	14	2	22	276	12.5	31	1	**1**	6	6.0	6	0	0	0
2026	SF	4	0	8	106	13.3	39	1	0	0	0.0	0	0	0	0
Career		165	70	280	3,395	12.1	89T	29	2	29	14.5	23	0	6	3

==== Postseason ====
Year	Team	Games		Receiving					Rushing					Fumbles	
Year	Team	GP	GS	Rec	Yds	Avg	Lng	TD	Att	Yds	Avg	Lng	TD	Fum	Lost
2016	KC	1	0	0	0	0.0	0	0	0	0	0.0	0	0	0	0
2017	KC	1	1	4	57	14.3	15	**1**	0	0	0.0	0	0	0	0
2018	KC	2	0	1	27	**27.0**	27	0	0	0	0.0	0	0	0	0
2019	KC	**3**	**2**	3	35	11.7	24	0	0	0	0.0	0	0	0	0
2020	KC	**3**	**2**	2	25	12.5	14	0	0	0	0.0	0	0	0	0
2021	KC	**3**	**2**	4	76	19.0	29	0	0	0	0.0	0	0	0	0
2022	BAL	1	0	2	49	24.5	41	**1**	0	0	0.0	0	0	0	0
2023	LAR	1	1	3	44	14.7	19	0	0	0	0.0	0	0	0	0
2024	LAR	2	2	4	97	24.3	48	0	0	0	0.0	0	0	0	0
2025	SF	2	1	**7**	**112**	16.0	**61**	**1**	0	0	0.0	0	0	0	0
Career		19	11	30	522	17.4	61	3	0	0	0.0	0	0	0	0

=== College ===
Season	GP	Receiving			
Season	GP	Rec	Yds	Avg	TD
2013	4	5	23	4.6	0
2014	11	53	810	15.3	7
2015	12	47	520	11.1	2
Career	27	105	1,353	12.9	9

== Personal life ==
Robinson's uncle, Marcus Robinson, was a wide receiver for the Chicago Bears, Baltimore Ravens, and Minnesota Vikings from 1997 to 2006.
