= 2013 Sugar Bowl =

2013 Allstate Sugar Bowl
- BCS Bowl Game; 79th Sugar Bowl
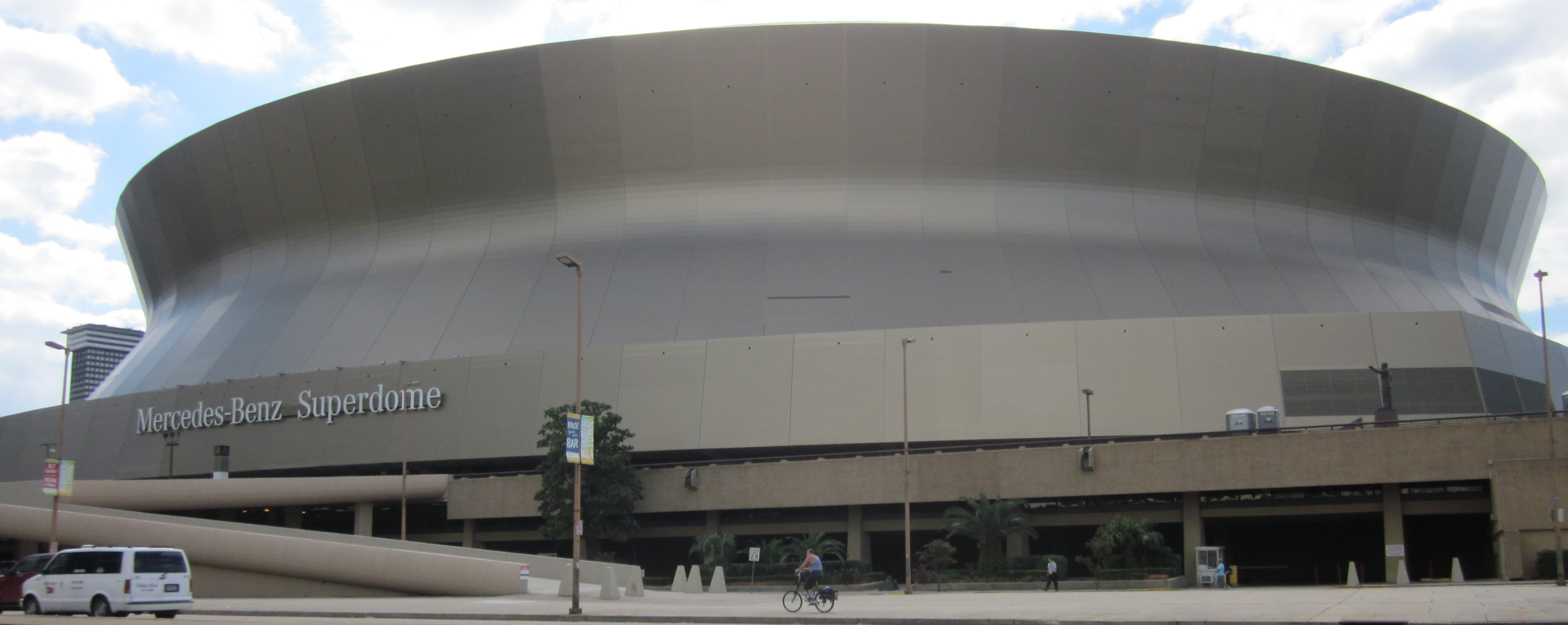
- The Mercedes-Benz Superdome in New Orleans, Louisiana, hosted the Sugar Bowl.
Louisville Cardinals	Florida Gators
(10–2)	(11–1)
Big East	SEC
33	23
Head coach: Charlie Strong	Head coach: Will Muschamp
AP / Coaches / BCS; 22 / 18 / 21	AP / Coaches / BCS; 4 / 4 / 3
	1	2	3	4	Total
Louisville	14	10	6	3	33
Florida	0	10	0	13	23
- Date: January 2, 2013
- Season: 2012
- Stadium: Mercedes-Benz Superdome
- Location: New Orleans, Louisiana
- MVP: Teddy Bridgewater (QB - Louisville)
- Favorite: Florida by 13½
- Referee: Dan Capron (Big Ten)
- Attendance: 54,178
- Payout: US$17,000,000 per team

United States TV coverage
- Network: ESPN, ESPN Deportes
- Announcers: ESPN: Sean McDonough (Play-by-Play); Chris Spielman (Analyst); Quint Kessenich (Sideline); ESPN Deportes: Eduardo Varela (Play-by-Play); Pablo Viruega (Analyst)
- Nielsen ratings: 6.4

The 2013 Allstate Sugar Bowl was a postseason college football bowl game on Wednesday, January 2, 2013, at the Mercedes-Benz Superdome in New Orleans, Louisiana. The game featured the Florida Gators of the SEC and the Louisville Cardinals of the Big East. The game was broadcast live on ESPN at 8:30 p.m. ET. Louisville was selected to their first Sugar Bowl after a 10–2 regular season that culminated in a share of the Big East title. Florida was picked as the other half of the matchup following an 11–1 campaign.

As two touchdown underdogs, the Louisville Cardinals beat the Gators 33–23. In recognition of his performance during the game, Louisville quarterback Teddy Bridgewater was named the game's most valuable player.

== Teams ==
The 2013 Sugar Bowl marked the third meeting between Florida and Louisville, with Florida holding a 2–0 advantage coming into the game. The previous meeting was on October 24, 1992, in a 31–17 win for the Gators.

=== Florida ===
Florida started the season with 7 straight wins before suffering their only regular season loss against rivals Georgia. The Gators ended the season 11–1 and were SEC Eastern Division Co-Champions. Because of their loss to Georgia, Florida did not play in the 2012 SEC Championship Game against Alabama. However, because Alabama was playing in the 2013 BCS National Championship Game, Florida was selected as an at-large pick to replace Alabama in the Sugar Bowl.

Florida came into the game with one of the nation's best defenses. In the regular season, Florida allowed an average of only 12.9 points per game, which was third in the FBS, and allowed only 5 passing touchdowns while making 19 interceptions. The Gators' defense was led by first-team All-America safety Matt Elam. On offense, the Gators were led by All-SEC running back Mike Gillislee, who came into the game with 1,104 rushing yards and 10 touchdowns.

This was the Gators' 9th Sugar Bowl appearance; they had previously appeared in the 2010 game against Cincinnati, where they won 51–24. Florida had a 3–5 record in the Sugar Bowl coming into the game.

=== Louisville ===
Louisville started the season with a 9–0 record before dropping back-to-back games against Syracuse and Connecticut. In their regular season finale, the Cardinals were able to beat Rutgers 20–17 in a come from behind victory to clinch a share of the final Big East title. Louisville ended the season with an overall record of 10–2.

Louisville entered the game averaging 31 points and 425.67 yards of offense per game. The Cardinals offense was led by Big East Offensive Player of the Year Teddy Bridgewater, who came into the game with 3,452 yards passing yards and 25 passing touchdowns. Louisville's ground game was led by running backs Jeremy Wright and Senorise Perry, who combined for 1,445 rushing yards and 20 rushing touchdowns.

This was Louisville's first appearance in the Sugar Bowl.

== Game summary ==
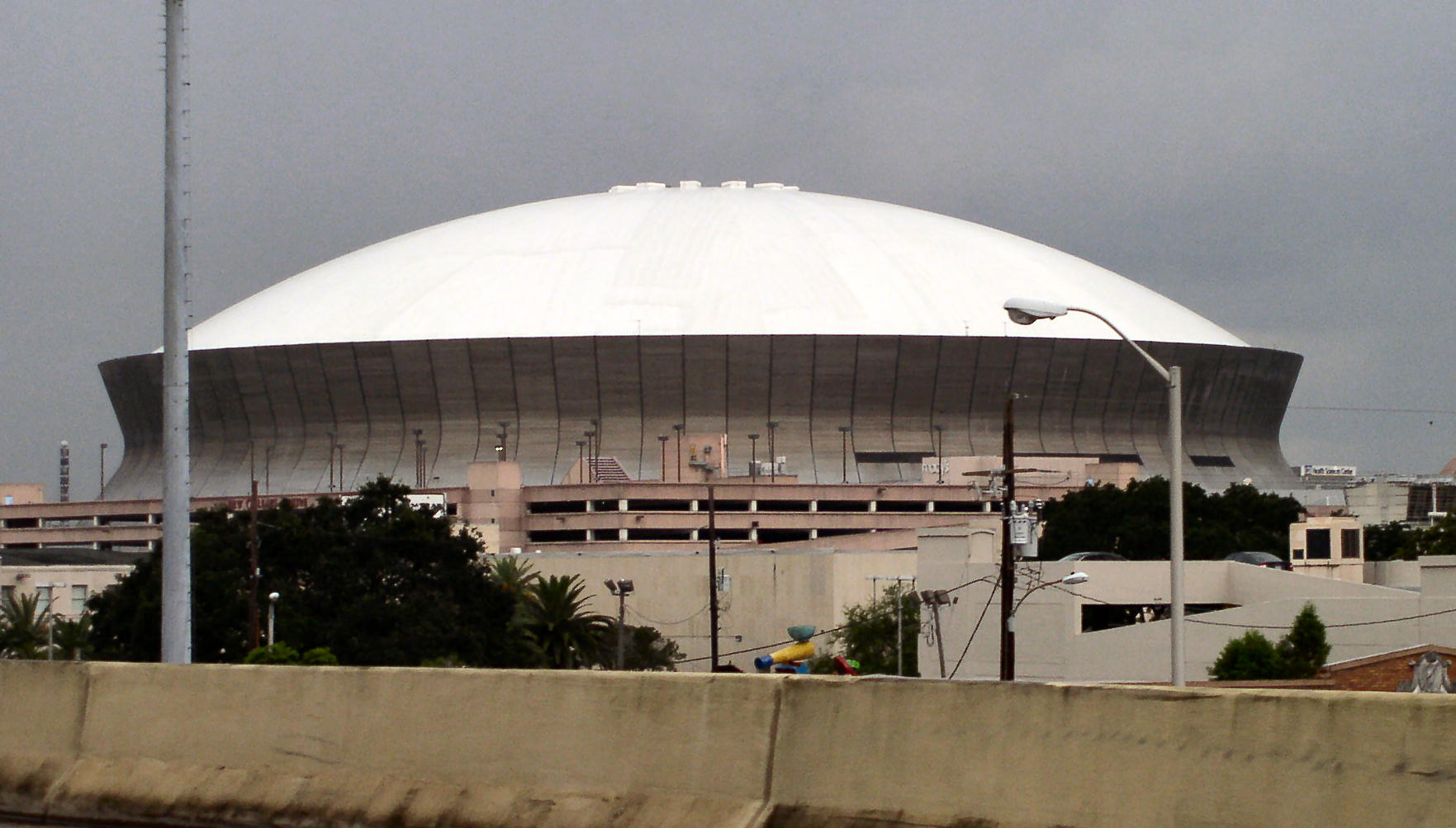
The 2013 Sugar Bowl was played at the Mercedes-Benz Superdome.

=== First half ===
Louisville scored on the first offensive play of the game when Louisville cornerback Terell Floyd intercepted Jeff Driskel and returned the ball 38 yards for a touchdown. Louisville further extended their lead to 14–0 on a 1-yard touchdown run by Jeremy Wright. Florida finally got on board in the second quarter with a 33-yard field goal from Caleb Sturgis to make it 14–3. Louisville responded with a 27-yard field goal from John Wallace to make it 17–3. After forcing Florida to punt, Louisville extended their lead 24–3 on a 15-yard touchdown pass from quarterback Teddy Bridgewater to DeVante Parker. Florida was able to close the gap towards the end of the second quarter on a 4th down, 1-yard touchdown run from Matt Jones to make the score 24–10 going into halftime.

=== Second half ===
Florida opened the second half on with an onside kick. However, Florida was unable to recover the onside kick, giving Louisville the ball at Florida's 19-yard line following personal foul penalties on Florida. Taking advantage of the good field position, the Cardinals scored on a 19-yard touchdown pass from Teddy Bridgewater to Damian Copeland. The extra point was blocked, however, giving Louisville a 30–10 lead. Louisville had a few more opportunities in the third quarter to extend their lead. The Cardinals defense recovered a fumble at Florida's 4-yard line. However, after Bridgewater was sacked twice on drive, placekicker John Wallace missed a 43-yard field goal. After forcing Florida to punt on the ensuing drive, Louisville was able to drive to Florida's 9-yard line. However, after an illegal block penalty that backed up the Cardinals to the 24-yard line, John Wallace's 41-yard field goal attempt was blocked.

Early in the 4th quarter, Florida drove to Louisville's 9-yard line. Florida came up empty, however, after Louisville's Andrew Johnson intercepted Jeff Driskel in the endzone. Taking advantage of the interception, Louisville extended their lead to 33–10 on a 30-yard field goal from John Wallace. On the ensuing kickoff, Florida's Andre Debose returned the ball 100 yards to cut the lead down to 33–17. After forcing Louisville to punt, Florida was able to cut further into the lead on a 5-yard touchdown pass from Jeff Driskel to Kent Taylor. Florida's two-point conversion attempt was unsuccessful, however, making the score 33–23 with 2:13 left in regulation. Florida was unable to recover the ensuing onside kick, and Louisville was able to hold on for the victory after getting a 1st down.

== Scoring summary ==
Scoring summary

Quarter	Time	Drive			Team	Scoring information	Score	
Quarter	Time	Plays	Yards	TOP	Team	Scoring information	LOU	FLA
1	14:45	-	-	-	LOU	Interception returned 32 yards for touchdown by Terrell Floyd, John Wallace kick good	7	0
1	6:47	12	83	6:24	LOU	Jeremy Wright 1-yard touchdown run, John Wallace kick good	14	0
2	14:50	12	66	6:57	FLA	33-yard field goal by Caleb Sturgis	14	3
2	8:39	11	66	6:11	LOU	27-yard field goal by John Wallace	17	3
2	2:57	8	54	3:55	LOU	DeVante Parker 15-yard touchdown reception from Teddy Bridgewater, John Wallace kick good	24	3
2	0:10	11	75	2:47	FLA	Matt Jones 1-yard touchdown run, Caleb Sturgis kick good	24	10
3	14:52	1	34	0:08	LOU	Damian Copeland 19-yard touchdown reception from Teddy Bridgewater, John Wallace kick blocked	30	10
4	7:54	10	65	5:27	LOU	30-yard field goal by John Wallace	33	10
4	7:41	-	-	-	FLA	Kickoff returned 100 yards for touchdown by Andre Debose, Caleb Sturgis kick good	33	17
4	2:13	13	97	3:46	FLA	Kent Taylor 5-yard touchdown reception from Jeff Driskel, 2-point conversion failed	33	23
"TOP" = time of possession. For other American football terms, see Glossary of American football.							33	23

=== Statistics ===
Statistics	LOU	FLA
First downs	23	17
Total offense, plays - yards	68–336	59–286
Rushes-yards (net)	36–70	30–111
Passing yards (net)	266	175
Passes, Comp-Att-Int	20–32–1	16–29–2
Time of Possession	35:37	24:23
