= Glades Day School =

Location
- 400 Gator Blvd; Belle Glade, Florida 33430; United States

Information
- Type: Preschool, Elementary and Secondary School
- Established: 1 June 1965; 61 years ago
- Grades: K-12
- Enrollment: 335
- Colors: Green & Gold
- Team name: Gators
- Website: www.gladesdayschool.com

Glades Day School is a K-12 private school in Belle Glade, Florida. It is accredited by the Florida Council of Independent Schools. It was founded in 1965 as a segregation academy by white parents in response to the court-ordered desegregation of Palm Beach public schools. It opened as Pahokee Day School and was renamed in 1967 as Day School of the Glades when it purchased and renovated the former Everglades Memorial Hospital in Pahokee.

In 2006, Pahokee Mayor JP Sasser told a newspaper that he left the school in 1970 because administrators prohibited the football team from shaking hands with racially integrated opponents, but that he now supports the school "because they are not the same school." In 2006, the student body was 8.5% Black, while nearby public high schools were (Glades Central and Pahokee) were more than 97% Black. Sasser said the Pahokee High School football team showed up to root for Glades Day as it pursued a state championship. "The people of the Glades come together for the Glades, and history's history."

== Athletics ==
The Robert L. Mace Athletic Center is the hub for sports at the school. It has a hardwood floor, an upstairs concession area and air-conditioned gym, and a weight room.

The Glades Day football team has won the FHSAA championship seven times, in 1980, 1982, 1986, 1995, 2006 (Class 1A, defeated North Florida Christian School, 42-9), 2009 (Class 1B, defeated Warner Christian Academy), and 2010.

In 2009, Kelvin Taylor was named the National Freshman of the Year by CBS's Maxpreps.com. He rushed for 2,597 yards and had a state-record 47 touchdowns on 295 carries.

Games can be heard on Florida Cast or on WBGF 93.5FM (In Palm Beach County)

== Notable alumni ==
- Stanley Arnoux (2004) - former NFL player who won a Super Bowl with the New Orleans Saints and played college football at Wake Forest
- Kelvin Taylor (2013) - professional football running back who played college football at Florida
