= Stanley Arnoux =

American football player (born 1986)

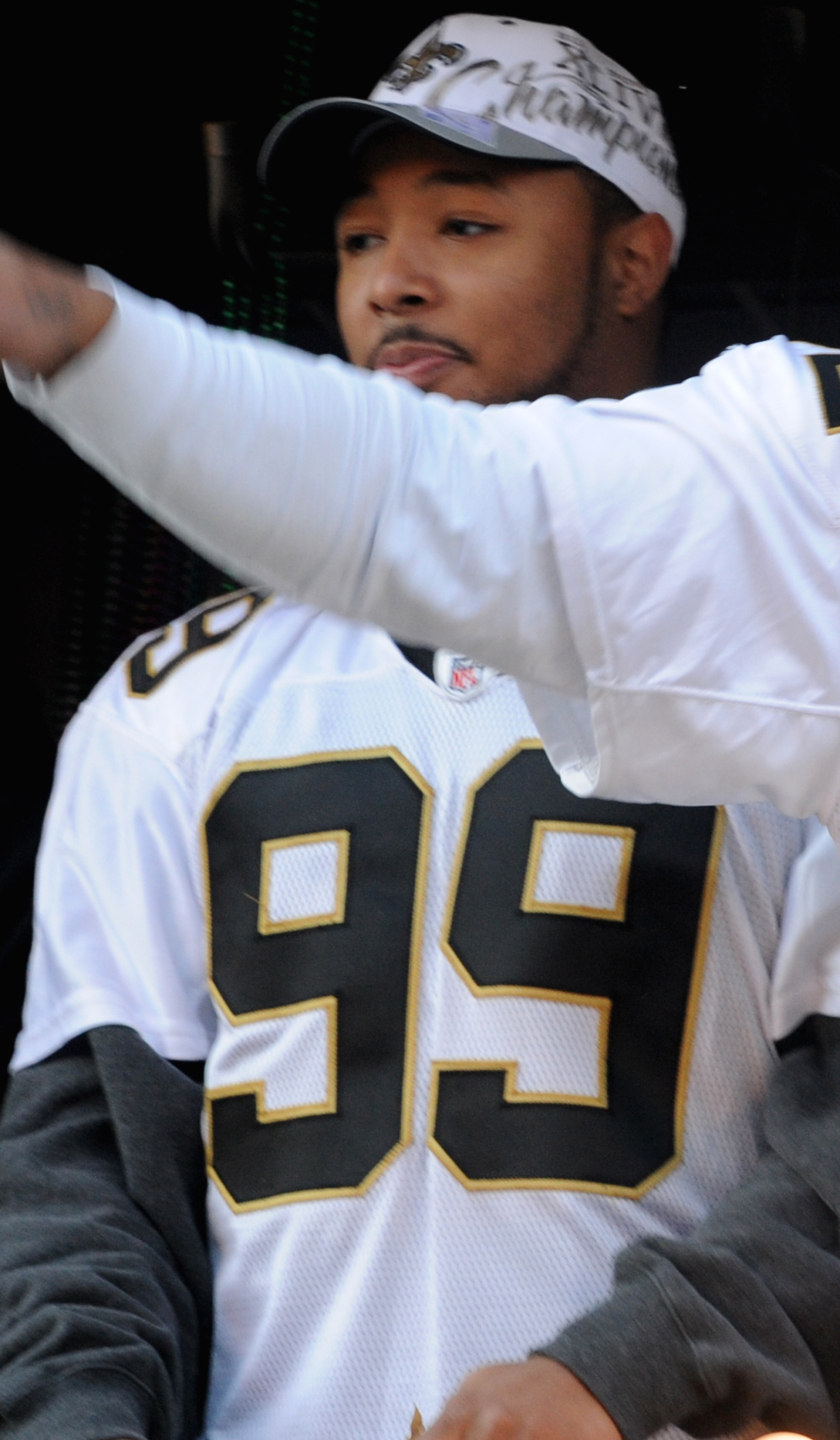
- Arnoux at the 2010 Saints Super Bowl parade

No. 99, 53
- Position: Linebacker

Personal information
- Born: September 9, 1986 (age 40); Sunrise, Florida, U.S.
- Listed height: 6 ft 1 in (1.85 m)
- Listed weight: 240 lb (109 kg)

Career information
- High school: Glades Day (FL)
- College: Wake Forest
- NFL draft: 2009: 4th round, 118th overall pick

Career history
- New Orleans Saints (2009–2010)

Awards and highlights
- Super Bowl champion (XLIV)
- Stats at Pro Football Reference

Stanley Arnoux (born September 9, 1986) is an American former professional football player who was a linebacker for the New Orleans Saints of the National Football League (NFL). He played college football for the Wake Forest Demon Deacons and was selected by the Saints in the fourth round of the 2009 NFL draft.

== Early life ==
Arnoux's parents were born in Haiti, and he is fluent in Haitian Creole.

== Professional career ==
At the 2009 NFL Scouting Combine, Arnoux ran the second fastest 40-yard dash time at the linebacker position. His official 40-yard dash time was 4.61 seconds.

Arnoux was selected by the New Orleans Saints in the fourth round of the 2009 NFL draft with the 118th overall pick. In the first practice of Saints rookie minicamp, Arnoux tore his left Achilles tendon. He missed the entire 2009 season due to the severity of the injury. He was signed to a four-year contract on September 7, 2009, and immediately placed on injured reserve due to his injury. In 2010, he was on the active roster for the Saints' first 10 games, but suffered another Achilles tendon injury in a game against Seattle, and was placed on the injured reserve list on November 23, 2010.

He was released by the Saints on July 29, 2011.
