= Jeff Driskel =

American football player (born 1993)

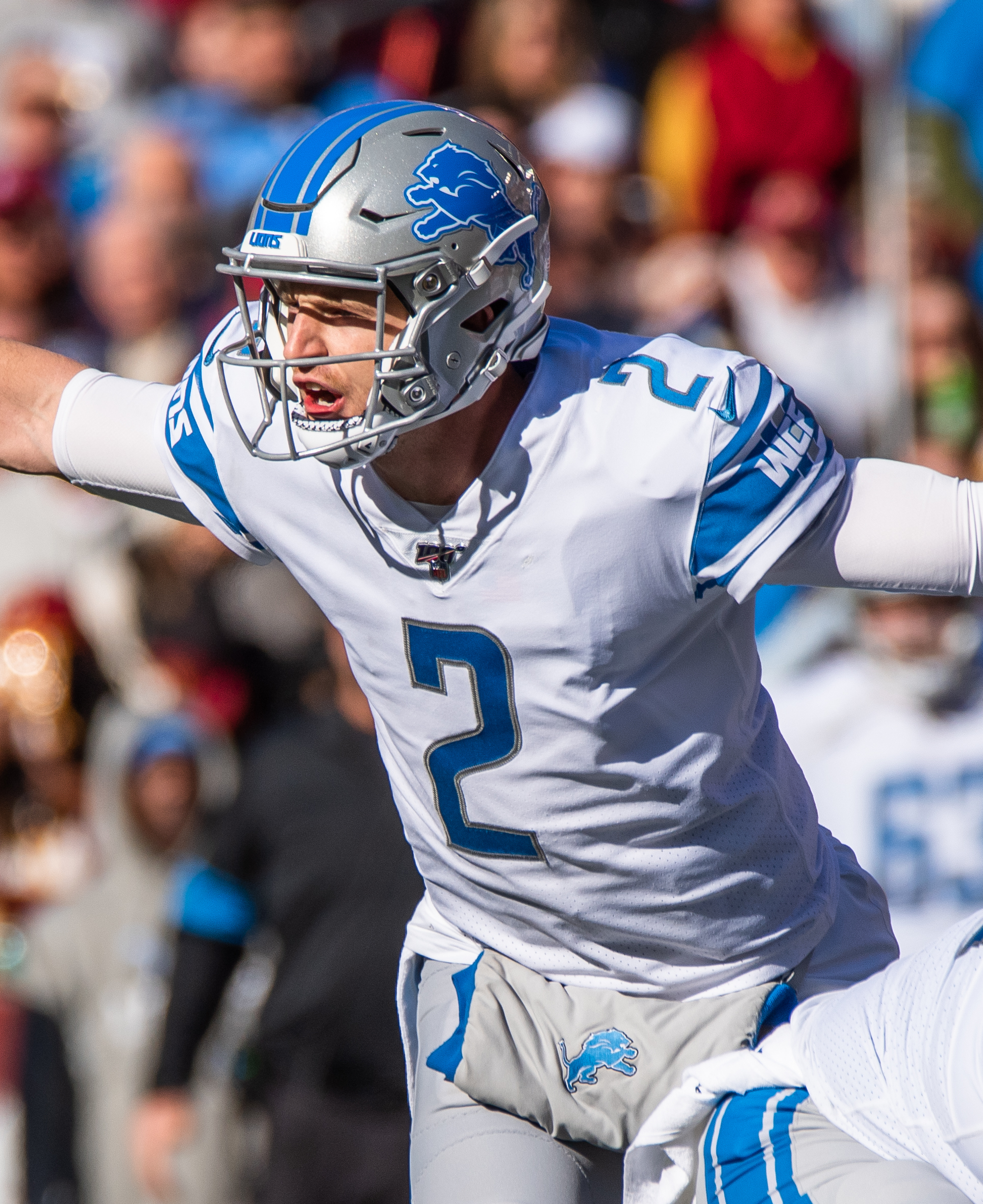
- Driskel with the Detroit Lions in 2019

Profile
- Position: Quarterback

Personal information
- Born: April 23, 1993 (age 33); Oviedo, Florida, U.S.
- Listed height: 6 ft 4 in (1.93 m)
- Listed weight: 231 lb (105 kg)

Career information
- High school: Paul J. Hagerty (Oviedo)
- College: Florida (2011–2014); Louisiana Tech (2015)
- NFL draft: 2016: 6th round, 207th overall pick

Career history
- San Francisco 49ers (2016)*; Cincinnati Bengals (2016–2018); Detroit Lions (2019); Denver Broncos (2020); Houston Texans (2021–2022); Arizona Cardinals (2023); Cleveland Browns (2023); Washington Commanders (2024); Las Vegas Raiders (2025)*; Arizona Cardinals (2025)*; Washington Commanders (2025)
- * Offseason or practice squad member only

Awards and highlights
- C–USA Newcomer of the Year (2015)

Career NFL statistics as of 2025
- Passing attempts: 391
- Passing completions: 229
- Completion percentage: 58.6%
- TD–INT: 16–10
- Passing yards: 2,394
- Passer rating: 79.4
- Rushing yards: 417
- Rushing touchdowns: 3
- Stats at Pro Football Reference

Jeffrey Matthew Driskel (born April 23, 1993) is an American professional football quarterback. He played college football for the Florida Gators and Louisiana Tech Bulldogs and was selected by the San Francisco 49ers in the sixth round of the 2016 NFL draft. Driskel has been a member of several other NFL teams, starting for the Cincinnati Bengals, Detroit Lions, Denver Broncos, Arizona Cardinals, Cleveland Browns, and Washington Commanders.

== Early life ==
Driskel attended Paul J. Hagerty High School in Oviedo, Florida, where he played high school football and baseball. During his high school career, he threw for 4,844 yards and 36 touchdowns. In 2010, Driskel was selected as a member of the Elite 11 quarterback competition, finishing first among quarterbacks and awarded MVP. As a senior in 2010, he was the Maxwell Football Club National High School Player of the Year and the Gatorade Florida Player of the Year. He was ranked as the best pro-style quarterback recruit in his class by Rivals.com and Scout.com.

== College career ==
=== Florida ===
Driskel accepted an athletic scholarship to attend the University of Florida, where he played for coach Will Muschamp's Florida Gators football team. As a freshman, Driskel appeared in five games, completing 16 of 34 passes for 148 yards with two interceptions. He became the team's starter as a sophomore in 2012. He led them to an 11–2 record and a berth in the 2013 Sugar Bowl, in which Florida lost to the Louisville Cardinals.

After starting three games in 2013, Driskel broke his right fibula in a game against Tennessee and missed the remainder of the season. He returned from the injury in 2014 and kept his starting job to start the season but was later benched in favor of Treon Harris.

=== Louisiana Tech ===
On January 3, 2015, Driskel was granted a release from Florida and he transferred to Louisiana Tech University. In his lone season at Louisiana Tech, he passed for 4,026 yards with 27 touchdowns.

== Baseball ==
Despite not playing baseball since high school, Driskel was selected by the Boston Red Sox with the 863rd pick of the 2013 Major League Baseball draft. Driskel signed a contract, but he had no plans to stop playing football.

== Professional career ==
Pre-draft measurables
Height	Weight	Arm length	Hand span	40-yard dash	10-yard split	20-yard split	20-yard shuttle	Three-cone drill	Vertical jump	Broad jump	Wonderlic
6 ft 4 in (1.93 m)	234 lb (106 kg)	33 in (0.84 m)	9 3/4 in (0.25 m)	4.56 s	1.65 s	2.71 s	4.25 s	7.19 s	32.0 in (0.81 m)	10 ft 2 in (3.10 m)	29
All values from NFL Combine

=== San Francisco 49ers ===
Driskel was selected by the San Francisco 49ers in the sixth round of the 2016 NFL draft with the 207th overall pick. The 49ers previously traded tight end Vernon Davis to the Denver Broncos in exchange for the pick used to select Driskel. On May 5, 2016, the 49ers signed him to a four-year, $2.45 million contract with a signing bonus of $112,539. Driskel began training camp as the No. 4 quarterback on the depth chart. After a season-ending injury to Thad Lewis, Driskel competed with Christian Ponder for the third-string quarterback position. On September 3, he was released by the 49ers as part of final roster cuts.

=== Cincinnati Bengals ===
On September 4, 2016, Driskel was claimed off waivers by the Cincinnati Bengals. He began the season as the Bengals' third-string quarterback on their depth chart, behind veterans Andy Dalton and A. J. McCarron.

On September 4, 2017, Driskel was placed on injured reserve.

In Week 7 of the 2018 season, Driskel made his regular-season NFL debut in relief of Andy Dalton in the fourth quarter. In the 45–10 loss to the Kansas City Chiefs, the former completed all four of his pass attempts for 39 yards. In Week 12 against the Cleveland Browns, Dalton was injured and subsequently ruled out for the season with a thumb injury. Driskel came into the game in relief and threw his first professional touchdown to wide receiver Tyler Boyd. He added a late rushing touchdown in the 35–20 loss. He started the last five games of the season for the Bengals, where he finished 1–4 and passed for 764 yards, five touchdowns, and two interceptions in five starts.

On August 31, 2019, Driskel was placed on injured reserve. He was waived from injured reserve with an injury settlement on September 11.

=== Detroit Lions ===
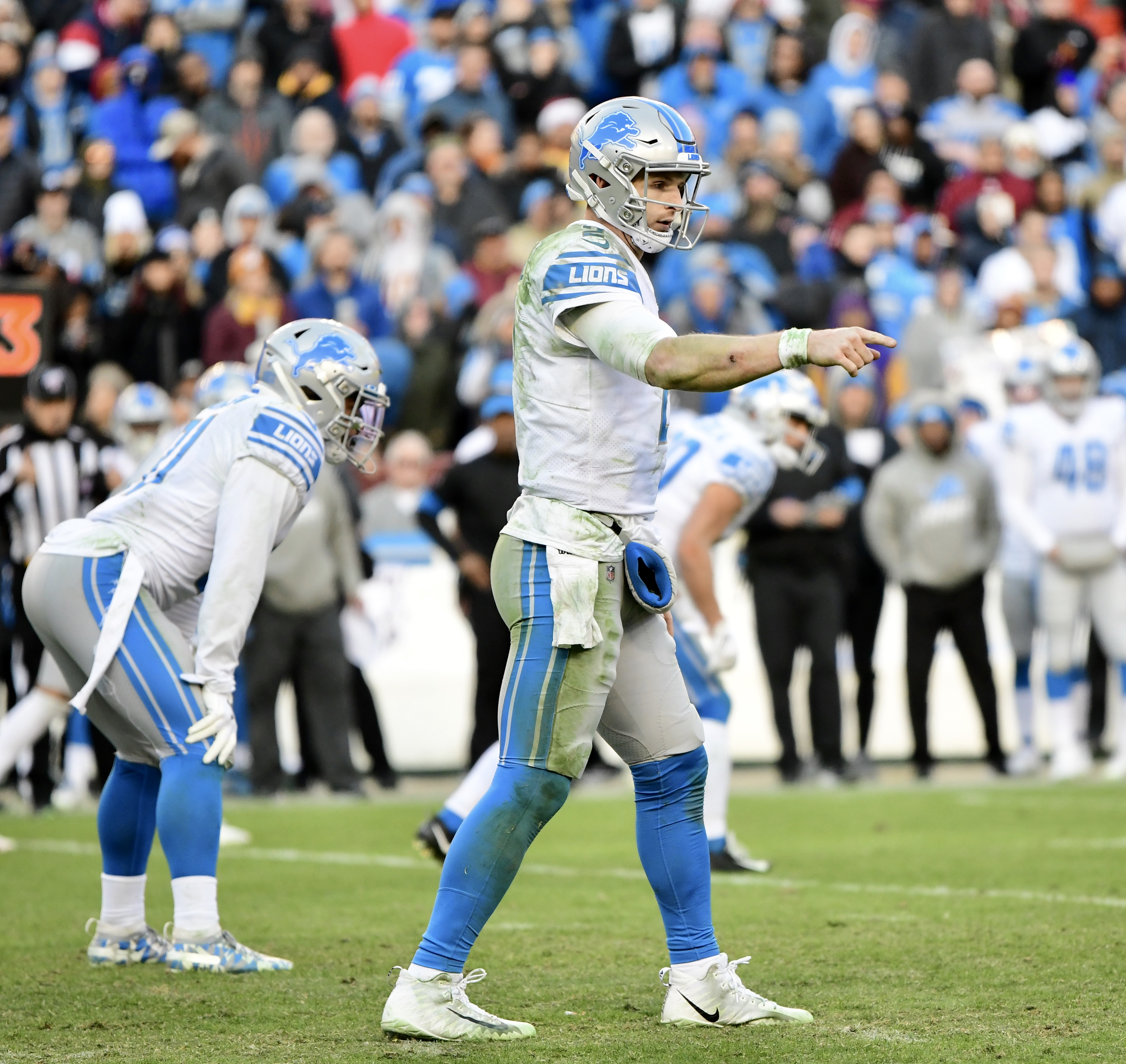
Driskel in a game against the Washington Redskins

On September 17, 2019, Driskel was signed by the Detroit Lions. In Week 10, Driskel made his first start for the Lions against the Chicago Bears after Matthew Stafford was inactive due to injury. He finished the contest with 269 passing yards, one touchdown, and one interception as the Lions lost 20–13. In Week 11 against the Dallas Cowboys, Driskel threw for 209 yards and two touchdowns, as well as 51 yards and a touchdown on the ground, in the 35–27 loss. After a Week 12 loss to the Washington Redskins, Driskel was placed on injured reserve with a hamstring injury. Rookie David Blough would start the remaining five regular season games, all of which resulted in losses.

=== Denver Broncos ===
On March 27, 2020, Driskel signed a two-year contract with the Denver Broncos. On September 20, Driskel came in for injured starting quarterback Drew Lock in a Week 2 matchup against the Pittsburgh Steelers. He passed for 256 yards, two touchdowns, and one interception in relief in the 26–21 loss. Driskel made his first start as a Bronco in Week 3 against the Tampa Bay Buccaneers. During the game, Driskel threw for 176 yards, 1 touchdown, and 1 interception before being benched in the fourth quarter of the 28–10 loss. On November 26, Driskel was placed on the reserve/COVID-19 list after testing positive for the virus. He and the other three quarterbacks on the Broncos roster were fined by the team for violating COVID-19 protocols. Driskel was activated from the COVID-19 list on December 16. On May 3, 2021, Driskel was released by the Broncos.

=== Houston Texans ===
On May 20, 2021, Driskel signed a one-year contract with the Houston Texans. He was released on August 31. Driskel was re-signed to the practice squad the following day. He was promoted to the active roster on October 16. On November 18, Driskel converted from quarterback to tight end, playing the position for the first time in his career. He was placed on injured reserve on December 22.

On March 18, 2022, Driskel re-signed with the Texans. He was released on August 30, and re-signed back to the practice squad the next day. He was promoted to the active roster on December 14.

=== Arizona Cardinals (first stint) ===
On April 17, 2023, Driskel signed a one-year contract with the Arizona Cardinals. He was released on August 29, and re-signed to the practice squad the next day. Driskel was released again on October 20 and re-signed to the practice squad on October 31. He was elevated to the active roster on November 4, to backup Clayton Tune against the Cleveland Browns. Driskel then reverted back to the practice squad after the game.

=== Cleveland Browns ===
On December 29, 2023, Driskel was signed by the Cleveland Browns off the Cardinals' practice squad.

On January 3, 2024, the Browns announced Driskel would be the starting quarterback in their Week 18 matchup against the Cincinnati Bengals. The Browns clinched a playoff berth the week prior, so they decided to rest some of their key starters, including quarterback Joe Flacco, for the regular season finale to avoid potential injury.

=== Washington Commanders (first stint) ===
On April 1, 2024, Driskel signed with the Washington Commanders.

=== Las Vegas Raiders ===
On September 1, 2025, Driskel signed with the Las Vegas Raiders' practice squad. He was released on October 8.

=== Arizona Cardinals (second stint) ===
On November 6, 2025, Driskel signed with the Arizona Cardinals' practice squad.

=== Washington Commanders (second stint) ===
On December 22, 2025, the Commanders signed Driskel off of the Cardinals' practice squad following an injury to Marcus Mariota.

== Career statistics ==
Legend
**Bold**	Career high

=== NFL ===
Year	Team	Games			Passing									Rushing					Sacked		Fumbles	
Year	Team	GP	GS	Record	Cmp	Att	Pct	Yds	Avg	Lng	TD	Int	Rtg	Att	Yds	Avg	Lng	TD	Sck	SckY	Fum	Lost
2016	CIN	Did not play																				
2017	CIN	Did not play																				
2018	CIN	9	5	1–4	**105**	**176**	59.7	**1,003**	5.7	37	**6**	2	82.2	**25**	130	5.2	**27**	**2**	**16**	**122**	**4**	**1**
2019	DET	3	3	0–3	62	105	59.0	685	6.5	**47**	4	**4**	75.3	22	**151**	**6.9**	23	1	11	46	1	0
2020	DEN	3	1	0–1	35	64	54.7	432	**6.8**	45	3	2	78.4	6	28	4.7	9	0	11	98	0	0
2021	HOU	1	0	—	0	0	0.0	0	0.0	0	0	0	0.0	0	0	0.0	0	0	0	0	0	0
2022	HOU	7	2	0–1	14	20	**70.0**	108	5.4	28	1	0	**99.6**	20	75	3.8	10	0	2	13	0	0
2023	CLE	1	1	0–1	13	26	50.0	166	6.4	31	2	2	63.9	7	33	4.7	13	0	3	26	0	0
2024	WAS	1	0	—	0	0	0.0	0	0.0	0	0	0	0.0	0	0	0.0	0	0	0	0	0	0
2025	WAS	Did not play																				
Career		25	12	1–10	229	391	58.6	2,394	6.1	47	16	10	79.4	80	417	5.2	27	3	43	305	5	1

=== College ===
Season	Team	Games			Passing								Rushing			
Season	Team	GP	GS	Record (Note: Accounts for only games started as a quarterback: On September 1, 2012, against Bowling Green, Jacoby Brissett took the first snap at quarterback while Jeff Driskel started at wide receiver, and Driskel replaced Brissett on the next play; Brissett was credited with the win, as the starter is awarded the win if the team wins, even if removed after the first play.)	Cmp	Att	Pct	Yds	Y/A	TD	Int	Rtg	Att	Yds	Avg	TD
2011	Florida	5	0	—	16	34	47.1	148	4.4	0	2	71.9	16	18	1.1	0
2012	Florida	12	12	**9−2**	156	245	63.7	1,646	6.7	12	5	132.2	**118**	**413**	**3.5**	4
2013	Florida	3	3	2−1	42	61	**68.9**	477	7.8	2	3	135.5	17	38	2.2	1
2014	Florida	9	6	3−3	114	212	53.8	1,140	5.4	9	**10**	103.5	69	180	2.6	4
2015	Louisiana Tech	13	13	9−4	**281**	**450**	62.4	**4,033**	**9.0**	**27**	8	**154.0**	92	323	**3.5**	**5**
Career		42	34	23−10	609	1,002	60.8	7,444	7.4	50	28	134.1	312	972	3.1	14
