= Kelvin Taylor =

American football player (born 1993)

No. 28
- Position: Running back

Personal information
- Born: September 28, 1993 (age 33); Belle Glade, Florida, U.S.
- Listed height: 5 ft 10 in (1.78 m)
- Listed weight: 205 lb (93 kg)

Career information
- High school: Glades Day (Belle Glade)
- College: Florida
- NFL draft: 2016: 6th round, 211th overall pick

Career history
- San Francisco 49ers (2016)*; Seattle Seahawks (2016); Kansas City Chiefs (2017)*; Atlanta Falcons (2017)*; Cleveland Browns (2018)*; Orlando Apollos (2019)*; Orlando Guardians (2023); Massachusetts Pirates (2023)
- * Offseason or practice squad member only
- Stats at Pro Football Reference

Kelvin Taylor (born September 28, 1993) is an American former professional football running back. He played college football for the Florida Gators.

== Early life ==
Taylor attended Glades Day School in Belle Glade, Florida. As a junior, he broke Emmitt Smith's Florida career rushing yards record. For his career, he had 12,121 yards and 191 touchdowns. Taylor was rated by ESPN.com as a five-star recruit and ranked as the nation's No. 1 running back in his class. He committed to the University of Florida to play college football.

== College career ==
As a true freshman at Florida in 2013, Taylor played in 10 games and made four starts. For the season he had 508 yards on 111 carries with four touchdowns. As a sophomore in 2014, he played in all 12 games with two starts. He carried the ball 116 times for 565 yards and six touchdowns. In the final game of his junior year, he became just the ninth player to rush for over 1,000 yards (1,035) in UF history. His 259 rushes were the second-most in a single season in school history and his 13 rushing touchdowns equaled the third-most by a running back in school history. Following his record-setting 2015 campaign, Taylor announced his intentions to enter the 2016 NFL draft.

== Professional career ==
Pre-draft measurables
Height	Weight	Arm length	Hand span	Wingspan	40-yard dash	10-yard split	20-yard split	20-yard shuttle	Three-cone drill	Vertical jump	Broad jump	Bench press
5 ft 10 1/4 in (1.78 m)	207 lb (94 kg)	29 1/4 in (0.74 m)	8 1/4 in (0.21 m)	5 ft 11 1/8 in (1.81 m)	4.60 s	1.57 s	2.63 s	4.56 s	7.23 s	32.0 in (0.81 m)	9 ft 5 in (2.87 m)	17 reps
All values from NFL Combine/Pro Day

=== San Francisco 49ers ===
Taylor was selected in the sixth round, 211th overall, in the 2016 NFL draft by the San Francisco 49ers. On September 3, 2016, he was released by the 49ers as part of final roster cuts and was signed to the practice squad the next day. He was released by the 49ers on November 28, 2016.

=== Seattle Seahawks ===
On November 30, 2016, Taylor was signed to the Seattle Seahawks' practice squad. He was released on December 8, 2016. On December 13, 2016, he was signed to the Seahawks' active roster. He was released on December 20, 2016, and re-signed to the practice squad. He signed a reserve/future contract with the Seahawks on January 16, 2017.

On May 4, 2017, Taylor was waived by the Seahawks.

=== Kansas City Chiefs ===
Taylor was claimed off waivers by the Kansas City Chiefs on May 5, 2017. He was waived by the Chiefs on May 9, 2017.

=== Atlanta Falcons ===
On August 8, 2017, Taylor signed with the Atlanta Falcons. He was waived on September 1, 2017.

=== Cleveland Browns ===
On January 10, 2018, Taylor signed a reserve/future contract with the Cleveland Browns. He was waived by the Browns on April 12, 2018.

=== Orlando Apollos ===
In 2018, Taylor signed with the Orlando Apollos of the Alliance of American Football.

=== Orlando Guardians ===
On November 17, 2022, Taylor was selected by the Orlando Guardians of the XFL. He signed with the team on February 15, 2023. He rushed for 84 yards in three games before he was released on March 8.

=== Massachusetts Pirates ===
On May 3, 2023, Taylor signed with the Massachusetts Pirates of the Indoor Football League (IFL). He became a free agent following the season.

== Personal life ==
Taylor is the son of former Jacksonville Jaguars running back, Fred Taylor, also out of Florida.
