= Andre Debose =

American gridiron football player (born 1990)

No. 4, 84
- Position: Wide receiver

Personal information
- Born: September 12, 1990 (age 36); Sanford, Florida, U.S.
- Listed height: 6 ft 0 in (1.83 m)
- Listed weight: 187 lb (85 kg)

Career information
- High school: Sanford (FL) Seminole
- College: Florida
- NFL draft: 2015: 7th round, 221st overall pick

Career history
- Oakland Raiders (2015); Indianapolis Colts (2016)*; Toronto Argonauts (2017)*
- * Offseason or practice squad member only
- Stats at Pro Football Reference

Andre Debose (born September 12, 1990) is an American former football wide receiver. He was a member of the Oakland Raiders and Indianapolis Colts. He played college football at Florida.

== Early life and college ==
A native of Sanford, Florida, Debose attended Seminole High School, where he was teammates with Ray-Ray Armstrong. Debose helped Sanford to the FHSAA Class 6A title over Teddy Bridgewater's Miami Northwestern by catching a 40-yard pass from Armstrong for the game-winning touchdown in the final seconds. He set the School record for the most return touchdowns and was tied for the Southeastern Conference (SEC) record with 5.

== Professional career ==
=== Oakland Raiders ===
Debose was selected by the Oakland Raiders in the seventh round, 221st overall in the 2015 NFL draft. He was expected to compete for the kick return job, however, he suffered a torn Achilles during organized team activities, which placed him on season-ending injured reserve. In his second year with the club Debose was waived/injured on May 24, 2016.

=== Indianapolis Colts ===
On July 30, 2016, Debose was signed by the Indianapolis Colts. He was waived by the club in mid-August only about two-weeks later.

=== Toronto Argonauts ===
On February 2, 2017, Debose and the Toronto Argonauts of the Canadian Football League (CFL) agreed to a contract.

On May 23, 2017, Debose was placed on the Argonauts' retired list.
