= Antonio Morrison =

American football player (born 1994)

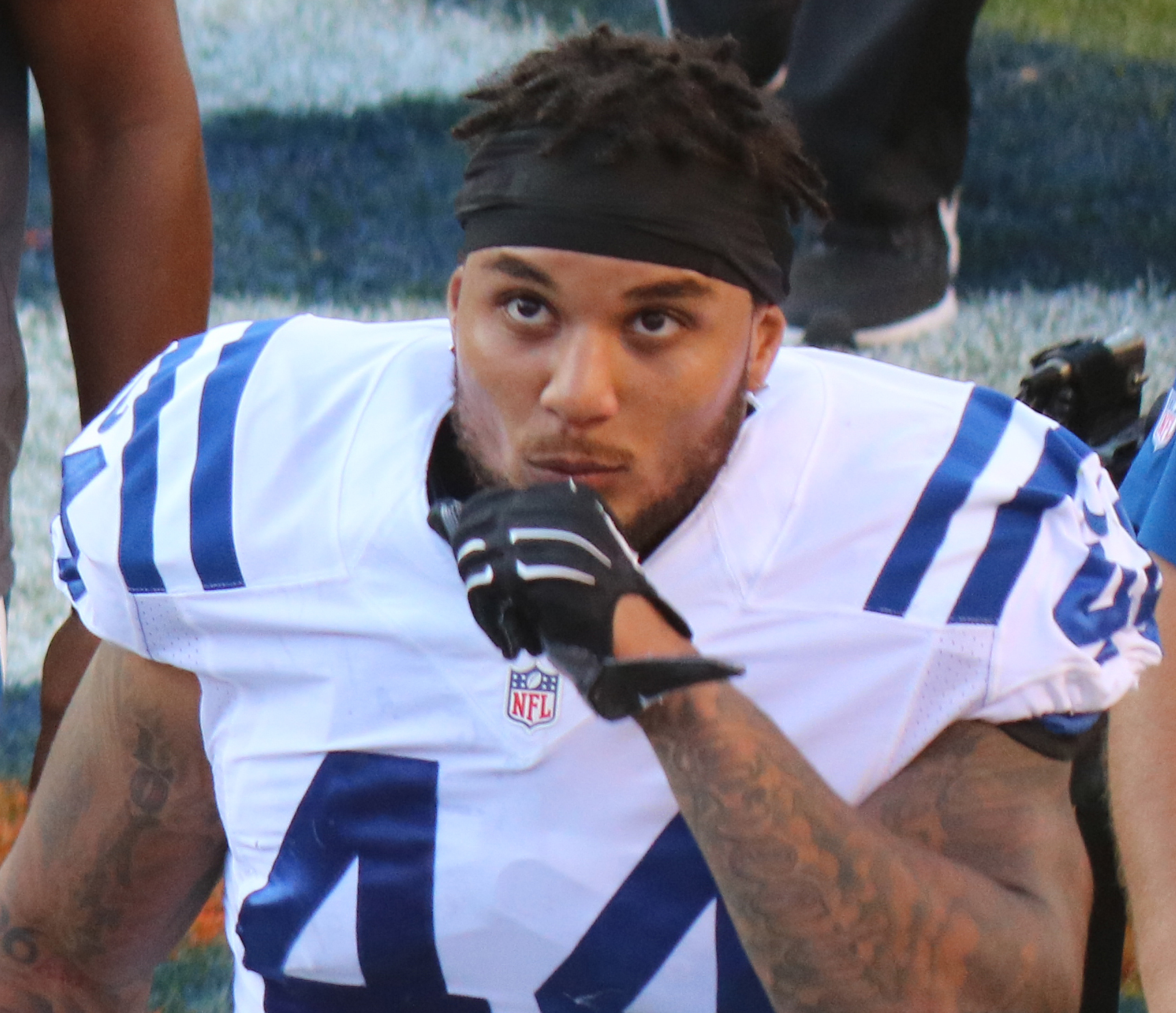
- Morrison with the Indianapolis Colts in 2016

No. 44
- Position: Linebacker

Personal information
- Born: December 6, 1994 (age 31); Bellwood, Illinois, U.S.
- Listed height: 6 ft 1 in (1.85 m)
- Listed weight: 241 lb (109 kg)

Career information
- High school: Bolingbrook (Bolingbrook, Illinois)
- College: Florida
- NFL draft: 2016: 4th round, 125th overall pick

Career history
- Indianapolis Colts (2016–2017); Green Bay Packers (2018)

Awards and highlights
- First-team All-SEC (2015); Second-team All-SEC (2014); Freshman All-SEC (2012)

Career NFL statistics
- Total tackles: 209
- Sacks: 1.0
- Stats at Pro Football Reference

Antonio Morrison (born December 6, 1994) is an American former professional football player who was a linebacker in the National Football League (NFL). He played college football for the Florida Gators, and was selected by the Indianapolis Colts in the fourth round of the 2016 NFL draft.

== Early life ==
Morrison lived in Bellwood, Illinois, and Romeoville, Illinois, before settling in Bolingbrook, Illinois, where he attended Bolingbrook High School. He was a three-year varsity starter for the football team. As a senior linebacker in 2011, Morrison was named 1st Team All-State after leading Bolingbrook to an IHSA Class 8A State Championship. After the season, Morrison participated in the Semper Fidelis All-American Bowl in Phoenix, Arizona. He was named a USA Today 2nd Team All-American.

Rated a 4-star recruit by Rivals.com, Morrison committed to Florida in August 2011 shortly before his senior season. He chose the Gators over numerous offers that included Alabama and Oregon.

== College career ==
In July 2013, Morrison was charged with interfering with a police animal after barking at a police dog. The charge was dropped after it was determined that Morrison acted without malice. He was suspended for 2 games for the incident by Florida head coach Will Muschamp.

On January 3, 2015, Morrsion played in the 2015 Birmingham Bowl, but left the Gators 28–20 victory over East Carolina in the second quarter after he suffered a knee injury while making a tackle. While covering a screen pass to an East Carolina running back, Morrison and a teammate playing defensive lineman both converged the East Carolina player to make the tackle. Morrison's teammate accidentally collided with his planted left leg. He immediately crumbled to the ground, clutching his left leg and began screaming in pain uncontrollably. The following day, Morrison was diagnosed with torn ligaments and a torn ACL in his left knee. His injury was described as devastating and Morrison was told he may never normally walk again, let alone return to football. The injury, dramatically changed Morrison's initial plan to forgo his senior season and enter the 2015 NFL draft. He had two surgeries on January 9, 2014 and February 23, 2015. Morrison was given a ten-month timetable to fully recovery, but managed to return in six months and was given the permission to return to football the following month in August.

In four seasons with the Florida Gators, Morrison compiled 315 total tackles, 21 tackles-for-loss, 4.5 sacks, 1 interception, and 3 forced fumbles.

== Professional career ==
=== Pre-draft ===
On December 8, 2015, it was announced that Morrison had accepted his invitation to play in the 2016 Senior Bowl. On January 30, 2016, Morrison played in the Reese's Senior Bowl and was part of Jacksonville Jaguars head coach Gus Bradley's South team that defeated the North 27–16. He was one of 38 collegiate linebackers that was invited to the NFL Scouting Combine in Indianapolis, Indiana. He failed to appear which initially cause speculation, but Morrison stated at Florida's pro day it was due to an infection. On March 22, 2016, Morrison attended Florida's pro day and performed all of the combine and positional drills as over 70 scouts and representatives from all 32 NFL teams looked on. Morrison also attended private workouts and visits with a few teams, including the Buffalo Bills, Tennessee Titans, and Chicago Bears. At the conclusion of the pre-draft process, Morrison was projected to be a seventh round pick or priority undrafted free agent by the majority of NFL draft experts and scouts. He was also ranked the 11th best inside linebacker prospect in the draft by NFLDraftScout.com and was ranked the 15th best linebacker by Sports Illustrated.

Pre-draft measurables
Height	Weight	Arm length	Hand span	40-yard dash	10-yard split	20-yard split	20-yard shuttle	Three-cone drill	Vertical jump	Broad jump	Bench press
6 ft 0 3/4 in (1.85 m)	232 lb (105 kg)	30 3/8 in (0.77 m)	9 in (0.23 m)	5.10 s	1.82 s	2.99 s	4.60 s	7.69 s	30 in (0.76 m)	9 ft 3 in (2.82 m)	23 reps
All values from Florida's Pro Day

=== Indianapolis Colts ===
==== 2016 ====
The Indianapolis Colts selected Morrison in the fourth round (125th overall) of the 2016 NFL draft. Morrison was the 18th linebacker selected in 2016. On May 6, 2016, the Colts signed Morrison to a four-year, $2.85 million contract that includes a signing bonus of $519,906.

Throughout training camp, Morrison competed against Sio Moore, Nate Irving, Amarlo Herrera, Junior Sylvestre, and Edwin Jackson in an open competition for the vacant starting inside linebacker role after Jerrell Freeman departed during free agency. Head coach Chuck Pagano named Morrison the fourth inside linebacker on the depth chart to begin the regular season, behind D'Qwell Jackson, Moore, and Josh McNary.

He made his professional regular season debut in the Colts' season-opener against the Detroit Lions and made one solo tackle during their 39–35 loss. Morrison made his first career tackle on tight end Eric Ebron after he caught a 13-yard pass from Matthew Stafford in the second quarter. On December 11, 2016, Morrison earned his first career start in place of Jackson after Jackson suffered a concussion during a Week 13 victory over the New York Jets and was placed in the concussion protocol. He finished the Colts' 22–17 loss to the Houston Texans with nine combined tackles. On December 24, 2016, Morrison collected a season-high 11 combined tackles as the Colts' lost 33–25 at the Oakland Raiders. Morrison finished his rookie season in 2016 with 52 combined tackles (33 solo) in 16 games and four starts. The Indianapolis Colts finished the 2016 season third in the AFC South with an 8–8 record and did not qualify for the playoffs. Pro Football Focus (PFF) ranked Morrison the third most efficient tackler among rookies in 2016 with a tackling efficiency grade of 12.3.

==== 2017 ====
Defensive coordinator Ted Monachino stated the Colts would hold an open competition during organized team activities and training camp to name a new starting inside linebackers to replace longtime veteran D'Qwell Jackson, who was released after the 2016 season. The competition included Morrison, Jon Bostic, Sean Spence, Luke Rhodes, Edwin Jackson, and rookie Anthony Walker Jr. Head coach Chuck Pagano named Morrison and Jon Bostic the starting inside linebackers, along with outside linebackers John Simon and Jabaal Sheard.

He started the Colts' season-opener at the Los Angeles Rams and recorded four combined tackles as the Colts were routed 46–9. The following week, he was inactive due to a groin injury and missed the Colts' 16–13 loss to the Arizona Cardinals. On October 22, 2017, he recorded a season-high 14 combined tackles during a 27–0 loss to the Jaguars. In Week 15, Morrison made 12 combined tackles in the Colts' 25–13 loss to the Denver Broncos. He completed his second season with a total of 109 combined tackles (64 solo) and one pass deflection in 15 games and 15 starts. Head coach Chuck Pagano was fired after the Colts finished 4–12 and did not qualify for the playoffs. The Colts' linebacker corps was weakest part of their defense. PFF gave Morrison an overall grade of 35.8 and it ranked 83rd among all linebackers in 2017.

=== Green Bay Packers ===
On August 26, 2018, Morrison was traded to the Green Bay Packers in exchange for cornerback Lenzy Pipkins. He recorded his first career sack on November 4, 2018, on New England Patriots quarterback Tom Brady.

On March 8, 2019, the Packers waived Morrison.

== NFL career statistics ==
=== Regular season ===
Year	Team	GP	GS	Tackles					Interceptions						Fumbles	
Year	Team	GP	GS	Total	Solo	Ast	Sck	SFTY	PDef	Int	Yds	Avg	Lng	TDs	FF	FR
2016	IND	16	4	52	33	19	0	0	0	0	0	0	0	0	0	0
2017	IND	15	15	109	69	45	0	0	1	0	0	0	0	0	0	0
2018	GB	16	8	47	27	20	1.0	0	0	0	0	0	0	0	0	0
Total		47	27	208	124	84	1.0	0	1	0	0	0	0	0	0	0
Source: NFL.com
