= 2014 Kentucky Wildcats football team =

American college football season

2014 Kentucky Wildcats football
- Conference: Southeastern Conference
- Eastern Division
- Record: 5–7 (2–6 SEC)
- Head coach: Mark Stoops (2nd season)
- Offensive coordinator: Neal Brown (2nd season)
- Offensive scheme: Air Raid
- Defensive coordinator: D. J. Eliot (2nd season)
- Base defense: 4–3
- Home stadium: Commonwealth Stadium

2014 Southeastern Conference football standings
	Conf.			Overall
Team	W		L	W		L
Eastern Division
No. 14 Missouri x	7	–	1	11	–	3
No. 9 Georgia	6	–	2	10	–	3
Florida	4	–	4	7	–	5
Tennessee	3	–	5	7	–	6
South Carolina	3	–	5	7	–	6
Kentucky	2	–	6	5	–	7
Vanderbilt	0	–	8	3	–	9
Western Division
No. 4 Alabama x$^	7	–	1	12	–	2
No. 11 Mississippi State	6	–	2	10	–	3
No. 17 Ole Miss *	5	–	3	9	–	4
No. 22 Auburn	4	–	4	8	–	5
LSU *	4	–	4	8	–	5
Texas A&M	3	–	5	8	–	5
Arkansas	2	–	6	7	–	6
Championship: Alabama 42, Missouri 13
^ – College Football Playoff participant; $ – Conference champion; x – Division champion/co-champions; * LSU and Ole Miss vacated all wins (except for Ole Miss' win over Presbyterian) due to NCAA violations.; Rankings from AP Poll

The 2014 Kentucky Wildcats football team represented the University of Kentucky in the 2014 NCAA Division I FBS football season. The Wildcats competed as a member of the Southeastern Conference (SEC) as part of its Eastern Division. The team was led by head coach Mark Stoops, in his second year, and played its home games at Commonwealth Stadium in Lexington, Kentucky. The team started 5–1, but lost their final six games and finished the season 5–7, 2–6 in SEC play, and sixth place in the Eastern Division.

== Pre-season ==
=== Schedule changes for 2014 ===
- Three of UK's annual opponents – Louisville, Tennessee, and Vanderbilt – will be played at different points in the schedule beginning in 2014.
- As requested by the SEC and the ACC, the Kentucky vs. Louisville game will be moved to the final game of the regular season on an annual basis. The leagues moved the game as a result of adjustments in scheduling brought on by the conference expansions undertaken in both the SEC and ACC. The switch of the Kentucky-Louisville game date means that there will be four SEC vs. ACC in-state rivalry matchups on the final weekend of the season. The Florida-Florida State, Georgia-Georgia Tech and South Carolina-Clemson tilts also are on that weekend.
- The UK vs. UofL game had been played early in the schedule since the series was renewed in 1994. For Kentucky, moving the game to the end of the regular season also will require another adjustment. Tennessee has been scheduled as the Wildcats' final foe since 1953 and the Volunteers will now move to November 15, 2014, meaning that UK will close the regular season with a pair of rivalry games.
- One other significant timing change comes with the Vanderbilt game. Having played VU in November every season since 1953, the Wildcats hosted the Commodores on September 27, 2014.

=== Commonwealth Stadium renovations ===
- Construction has begun on the $120 million renovation of Commonwealth Stadium, a project that features a new look for the exterior of the stadium, wider and redesigned concourses, new concession stands and rest rooms, new suites and other premium seating, a recruiting room and a new press box.
- It is a two-year project but there should be minimal disruption for the 2014 season. Part of the southside upper deck has been removed in order to begin the new suite/press box complex and there will be some utility and other site preparation work done this year. Seating capacity for the stadium will be 62,093 for the 2014 campaign.
- The majority of the construction will begin immediately after the last home game on Nov. 8. The reworked stadium is expected to be complete in time for the 2015 season.
- Meanwhile, UK also has begun planning for a $45 million football office/practice complex that will be built on the south end of the existing Nutter Field House. Construction of that facility is expected to commence following the season, with completion targeted for 2016.

=== 2014 signing class ===
College recruiting information (2014)
Name	Hometown	School	Height	Weight	Commit date
Dorian Baker; WR	Cleveland Heights, Ohio	Cleveland Heights	6 ft 3 in (1.91 m)	205 lb (93 kg)	Oct 20, 2013
Dorian Baker; WR	Recruit ratings: Scout: Rivals: 247Sports: ESPN:				
Drew Barker; QB	Burlington, Kentucky	Conner	6 ft 3 in (1.91 m)	217 lb (98 kg)	May 10, 2013
Drew Barker; QB	Recruit ratings: Scout: Rivals: 247Sports: ESPN:				
Blake Bone; WR	Woodruff, South Carolina	Woodruff	6 ft 5 in (1.96 m)	200 lb (91 kg)	Aug 27, 2013
Blake Bone; WR	Recruit ratings: Scout: Rivals: 247Sports: ESPN:				
Tymere Dubose; DE	Youngstown, Ohio	Youngstown Christian	6 ft 5 in (1.96 m)	280 lb (130 kg)	Apr 27, 2013
Tymere Dubose; DE	Recruit ratings: Scout: Rivals: 247Sports: ESPN:				
Mike Edwards; DB	Cincinnati, Ohio	Winton Woods	5 ft 11 in (1.80 m)	185 lb (84 kg)	Jun 10, 2013
Mike Edwards; DB	Recruit ratings: Scout: Rivals: 247Sports: ESPN:				
Matt Elam; DT	Elizabethtown, Kentucky	John Hardin	6 ft 7 in (2.01 m)	375 lb (170 kg)	Jan 30, 2014
Matt Elam; DT	Recruit ratings: Scout: Rivals: 247Sports: ESPN:				
Nico Firios; LB	Longwood, Florida	Lyman	6 ft 2 in (1.88 m)	220 lb (100 kg)	Jun 11, 2013
Nico Firios; LB	Recruit ratings: Scout: Rivals: 247Sports: ESPN:				
Ryan Flannigan; LB	Missouri City, Texas	Blinn	6 ft 3 in (1.91 m)	230 lb (100 kg)	Jun 5, 2013
Ryan Flannigan; LB	Recruit ratings: Scout: Rivals: 247Sports: ESPN:				
Dorian Hendrix; LB	Huber Heights, Ohio	Wayne	6 ft 0 in (1.83 m)	230 lb (100 kg)	Mar 22, 2013
Dorian Hendrix; LB	Recruit ratings: Scout: Rivals: 247Sports: ESPN:				
Mikel Horton; RB	West Chester, Ohio	Lakota West	6 ft 1 in (1.85 m)	223 lb (101 kg)	Apr 20, 2013
Mikel Horton; RB	Recruit ratings: Scout: Rivals: 247Sports: ESPN:				
Cory Johnson; DT	Columbia, South Carolina	ASA	6 ft 3 in (1.91 m)	275 lb (125 kg)	Jul 20, 2013
Cory Johnson; DT	Recruit ratings: Scout: Rivals: 247Sports: ESPN:				
Garrett Johnson; WR	Winter Garden, Florida	Winter Garden	5 ft 11 in (1.80 m)	175 lb (79 kg)	May 25, 2013
Garrett Johnson; WR	Recruit ratings: Scout: Rivals: 247Sports: ESPN:				
Josh Krok; OT	Niles, Ohio	McKinley	6 ft 8 in (2.03 m)	325 lb (147 kg)	Jan 23, 2014
Josh Krok; OT	Recruit ratings: Scout: Rivals: 247Sports: ESPN:				
Jarrett LaRubbio; OG	Middletown, Ohio	Lakota East	6 ft 6 in (1.98 m)	280 lb (130 kg)	May 25, 2013
Jarrett LaRubbio; OG	Recruit ratings: Scout: Rivals: 247Sports: ESPN:				
Darryl Long; TE	Westerville, Ohio	Westerville South	6 ft 4 in (1.93 m)	225 lb (102 kg)	Apr 27, 2013
Darryl Long; TE	Recruit ratings: Scout: Rivals: 247Sports: ESPN:				
Adrian Middleton; DT	Bowling Green, Kentucky	South Warren	6 ft 3 in (1.91 m)	275 lb (125 kg)	Jun 15, 2013
Adrian Middleton; DT	Recruit ratings: Scout: Rivals: 247Sports: ESPN:				
Kendall Randolph; DB	Tallahassee, Florida	Lincoln	6 ft 0 in (1.83 m)	175 lb (79 kg)	Jan 21, 2014
Kendall Randolph; DB	Recruit ratings: Scout: Rivals: 247Sports: ESPN:				
Nick Richardson; OT	Westerville, Ohio	Westerville Central	6 ft 4 in (1.93 m)	270 lb (120 kg)	Jul 30, 2013
Nick Richardson; OT	Recruit ratings: Scout: Rivals: 247Sports: ESPN:				
Thaddeus Snodgrass; WR	Springfield, Ohio	Westerville Central	6 ft 1 in (1.85 m)	180 lb (82 kg)	Apr 12, 2013
Thaddeus Snodgrass; WR	Recruit ratings: Scout: Rivals: 247Sports: ESPN:				
Jervontius Stallings; OC	Hoover, Alabama	Spain Park	6 ft 3 in (1.91 m)	320 lb (150 kg)	Jan 29, 2014
Jervontius Stallings; OC	Recruit ratings: Scout: Rivals: 247Sports: ESPN:				
A.J. Stamps; DB	Vicksburg, Mississippi	East Mississippi	6 ft 0 in (1.83 m)	190 lb (86 kg)	Dec 18, 2013
A.J. Stamps; DB	Recruit ratings: Scout: Rivals: 247Sports: ESPN:				
Lloyd Tubman; DE	Louisville, Kentucky	Seneca	6 ft 5 in (1.96 m)	225 lb (102 kg)	Feb 5, 2014
Lloyd Tubman; DE	Recruit ratings: Scout: Rivals: 247Sports: ESPN:				
Jared Tucker; DB	Stone Mountain, Georgia	Stephenson	5 ft 11 in (1.80 m)	170 lb (77 kg)	May 29, 2013
Jared Tucker; DB	Recruit ratings: Scout: Rivals: 247Sports: ESPN:				
Kobie Walker; LB	Olney, Maryland	Our Lady of Good Counsel	6 ft 3 in (1.91 m)	200 lb (91 kg)	Jun 9, 2013
Kobie Walker; LB	Recruit ratings: Scout: Rivals: 247Sports: ESPN:				
Denzel Ware; DE	Crestview, Florida	Crestview	6 ft 2 in (1.88 m)	240 lb (110 kg)	May 13, 2013
Denzel Ware; DE	Recruit ratings: Scout: Rivals: 247Sports: ESPN:				
Darius West; DB	Lima, Ohio	Lima	6 ft 0 in (1.83 m)	200 lb (91 kg)	Jun 10, 2013
Darius West; DB	Recruit ratings: Scout: Rivals: 247Sports: ESPN:				
Stanley Williams; RB	Monroe, Georgia	George Walton	5 ft 9 in (1.75 m)	190 lb (86 kg)	Jun 13, 2013
Stanley Williams; RB	Recruit ratings: Scout: Rivals: 247Sports: ESPN:				
T.V. Williams; WR	McKinney, Texas	McKinney	5 ft 10 in (1.78 m)	165 lb (75 kg)	Jul 9, 2013
T.V. Williams; WR	Recruit ratings: Scout: Rivals: 247Sports: ESPN:				
Overall recruit ranking: Scout: 21 Rivals: 17 247Sports: 22 ESPN: 24
Note: In many cases, Scout, Rivals, 247Sports, On3, and ESPN may conflict in their listings of height and weight.; In these cases, the average was taken. ESPN grades are on a 100-point scale.; Sources: "Kentucky 2014 Football Commitments". Rivals.; "2014 Kentucky Football Commits". Scout.; "ESPN". ESPN.; "Scout.com Team Recruiting Rankings". Scout.; "2014 Team Ranking". Rivals.com.

== Personnel ==
=== Roster and staff ===
2014 Kentucky Wildcats football team roster
Players
Coaches
Offense

Pos.	#	Name	Class
WR	8	Javess Blue	Sr
QB	7	Drew Barker	Fr
WR	9	Demarco Robinson	Sr
WR	10	Thaddeus Snodgrass	Fr
QB	11	Max Smith	Jr
QB	12	Reese Phillips	Fr
WR	13	Jeff Badet	So
QB	14	Patrick Towles	So
WR	17	Alexander Montgomery	So
RB	18	Stanley Williams	Fr
WR	19	Garrett Johnson	Fr
RB	21	Josh Clemons	Jr
RB	25	Jonathan George	Sr
RB	32	William Mahone	Fr
TE	34	Thaddeus Kazunas	Fr
FB	39	DJ Warren	Sr
FB	46	Jeff Witthuhn	So
FB	48	Will Collins	So
G	55	David Baumer	Fr
G	57	Zach Myers	So
OT	62	Dylan Greenburg	Fr
C	64	Max Godby	Sr
C	65	Jervontius Stallings	Fr
G	67	Jarrett LaRubbio	Fr
G	68	Nick Haynes	Fr
G	69	Ramsey Meyers	Fr
OT	70	Jordan Swindle	Jr
G	71	John Gruenschlaeger	Jr
C	72	Jon Toth	So
OT	73	Kyle Meadows	Fr
G	74	Cole Mosier	Fr
G	75	Zach West	Jr
G	76	Teven Eatmon-Nared	Sr
OT	77	Darrian Miller	Sr
OT	78	Nick Richardson	Fr
OT	79	Josh Krok	Fr
TE	80	Ronnie Shields	Sr
WR	81	Rashad Cunningham	Jr
WR	82	T.V. Williams	Fr
WR	83	Cameron Fogle	Fr
WR	84	Miles Thompson	Fr
TE	85	Steven Borden	Sr
TE	86	Darryl Long	Fr
WR	87	Joey Herrick	Jr
WR	88	A.J. Johnson	Sr

Defense

Pos.	#	Name	Class
CB	1	A.J. Stamps	Jr
LB	2	Alvin Dupree	Sr
CB	3	Fred Tiller	Jr
S	5	Ashely Lowery	Sr
DE	6	Jason Hatcher	So
LB	7	Daron Blaylock	Jr
LB	8	Kobie Walker	Fr
LB	10	Tyler Brause	Sr
CB	11	J.D. Harmon	So
LB	14	Dorian Hendrix	Fr
S	15	Marcus McWilson	So
CB	16	Cody Quinn	Jr
S	17	Zack Blaylock	So
S	18	Glenn Faulkner	Jr
DB	19	Jaleel Hytchye	So
LB	20	Josh Harris	So
DB	21	Nate Willis	Sr
LB	22	Khalid Henderson	Jr
DB	23	Jared Tucker	Jr
DB	23	Rodney Cox	Jr
DB	24	Blake McClain	So
CB	25	Patrick Sermersheim	Fr
S	25	Darius West	Fr
FS	27	Alex Karian	Fr
CB	28	Eric Dixon	Sr
CB	29	Kendall Randolph	Fr
CB	31	Keron Wakefield	Fr
LB	33	Ryan Flannigan	Jr
CB	35	Jerry McCray	So
LB	40	Nico Firios	Fr
LB	41	Travaughn Paschal	Sr
LB	44	Grant Aumiller	Sr
LB	45	Josh Forrest	Jr
DT	47	Jabari Johnson	Jr
LB	49	Robbie Irgang	Fr
DT	50	Mike Douglas	Sr
DE	55	Denzil Ware	Fr
DT	59	Adrian Middleton	Fr
DT	60	Alvin Davis	Sr
DT	66	Jacob Hyde	Fr
DT	67	Cory Johnson	Jr
DT	69	Matt Elam	Fr
DT	78	Zane Williams	So
DT	90	Melvin Lewis	Jr
DE	91	Farrington Huguenin	Jr
DT	92	Christian Coleman	Sr
DE	93	Lloyd Tubman	Fr
DE	94	Za'Darius Smith	Sr
DT	96	Regie Meant	Fr
DE	98	Tymere Dubose	Fr

Special teams

Pos.	#	Name	Class
H	13	Jared Leet	Jr
PK, P	9	Landon Foster	Jr
PK	99	Austin MacGinnis	Fr

Head coach

- Mark Stoops

Coordinators/assistant coaches

- Derrick Ansley
  Defensive backs
- Neal Brown
  Offensive coordinator/quarterbacks
- Jimmy Brumbaugh
  Defensive line
- D. J. Eliot
  Defensive coordinator/linebackers
- Tommy Mainord
  Wide receivers
- Vince Marrow
  Tight ends
- Craig Naivar
  Safeties/special teams coordinator
- John Schlarman
  Offensive line
- Chad Scott
  Running racks

Legend

- (C) Team captain
- (S) Suspended
- (I) Ineligible
- Injured
- Redshirt

Roster
Last update: May 7, 2014

=== Depth chart ===
- As of 9/1 for UT-Martin game

Defense

FS
AJ Stamps (Jr.)
Mike Edwards (Fr.)

WLB	MLB	SLB
WLB_Starter	Josh Forrest (Jr.)	SLB_Starter
Tra'Vaughn Paschal (Sr.)	Tra'Vaughn Paschal (Sr.)	SLB_Backup

SS
Ashely Lowery (Sr.)
Marcus McWilson (So.)

CB
Fred Tiller (Jr.)
Garrett Johnson (Fr.)

DE	DT	DT	DE
Jason Hatcher (So.)	Melvin Lewis (Jr.)	Mike Douglas (Sr.)	Za'Darius Smith (Sr.)
Jabari Johnson (Jr.)	Matt Elam (Fr.)	CJ Johnson (Jr.)	Farrington Huguenin (Jr.)

CB
Cody Quinn (Jr.)
Nate Willis (Sr.)

Offense

WR X
Demarco Robinson (Sr.)
Blake Bone (Fr.)

WR Z
Javess Blue (Sr.)
Dorian Baker (Fr.)

LT	LG	C	RG	RT
Darrian Miller (Sr.)	Zach West (Jr.)	Jon Toth (So.)	Ramsey Meyers (Fr.)	Jordan Swindle (Jr.)
Nick Haynes (Fr.)	Cole Mosier (Fr.)	Zach Myers (So.)	Max Godby (Sr.)	Kyle Meadows (Fr.)

TE
Steven Borden (Sr.)
Ronnie Shields (Sr.)

WR Y
Ryan Timmons (So.)
TV Williams (Fr.)

QB
Patrick Towles (So.)
Reese Phillips (Fr.)

Key reserves
DB Blake McClain (So.)
FB DJ Warren (Sr.)
RB Josh Clemons (Jr.)
RB Stanley Williams (Fr.)
WR Garrett Johnson (Fr.)

RB
Braylon Heard (Jr.)
Jojo Kemp (So.)

Special teams
PK Austin MacGinnis (Fr.)
P Landon Foster (Jr.)
KR Stanley Williams (Fr.)
PR Demarco Robinson (Sr.)
LS Kelly Mason (Jr.)
H Jaret Leet (Jr.)

== Schedule ==
Date	Time	Opponent	Site	TV	Result	Attendance
August 30	12:00 p.m.	UT Martin*	Commonwealth Stadium; Lexington, KY	SECN	W 59–14	50,398
September 6	3:30 p.m.	Ohio*	Commonwealth Stadium; Lexington, KY	ESPNU	W 20–3	51,910
September 13	7:30 p.m.	at Florida	Ben Hill Griffin Stadium; Gainesville, FL (SEC Nation) (rivalry)	SECN	L 30–36 ^{3OT}	88,334
September 27	12:00 p.m.	Vanderbilt	Commonwealth Stadium; Lexington, KY (rivalry)	SECN	W 17–7	56,940
October 4	7:30 p.m.	South Carolina	Commonwealth Stadium; Lexington, KY	SECN	W 45–38	62,135
October 11	12:00 p.m.	Louisiana–Monroe*	Commonwealth Stadium; Lexington, KY	SECN	W 48–14	56,676
October 18	7:30 p.m.	at LSU	Tiger Stadium; Baton Rouge, LA	SECN	L 3–41	101,581
October 25	3:30 p.m.	No. 1 Mississippi State^{†}	Commonwealth Stadium; Lexington, KY (SEC Nation)	CBS	L 31–45	64,791
November 1	4:00 p.m.	at Missouri	Faurot Field; Columbia, MO (SEC Nation)	SECN	L 10–20	62,004
November 8	12:00 p.m.	No. 20 Georgia	Commonwealth Stadium; Lexington, KY	ESPN	L 31–63	60,152
November 15	4:00 pm	at Tennessee	Neyland Stadium; Knoxville, TN (Battle for the Barrel)	SECN	L 16–50	102,455
November 29	12:00 p.m.	at No. 22 Louisville*	Papa John's Cardinal Stadium; Louisville, KY (Governor's Cup)	ESPN2	L 40–44	55,118
*Non-conference game; ^{†}Homecoming; Rankings from AP Poll (and CFP Rankings after October 28) released prior to game; All times are in Eastern time

Schedule source:

== Game summaries ==
=== UT Martin ===
UT Martin at Kentucky

Team	1	2	3	4	Total
Skyhawks	0	0	0	14	14
• Wildcats	14	21	17	7	59

- Date: August 28
- Location: Commonwealth Stadium
  Lexington, Kentucky
- Game start: 12:01 p.m. EST
- Elapsed time: 3:35
- Game attendance: 50,398
- Game weather: 89 °F (32 °C), Partly Cloudy, winds SSW at 11 MPH
- Referee: David Smith
- TV announcers (SECN/UK): Tom Hart, Matt Stinchcomb, & Heather Mitts (SECN) / Tom Leach & Jeff Piecoro (UK IMG)

Scoring summary
1	7:02	UK	2-yard touchdown run by Jojo Kemp, Austin MacGinnis kick good	UK 7–0
1	1:44	UK	73-yard touchdown run by Braylon Heard, Austin MacGinnis kick good	UK 14–0
2	13:10	UK	43-yard touchdown run by Braylon Heard, Austin MacGinnis kick good	UK 21–0
2	8:10	UK	Blake Bone 29-yard touchdown pass from Patrick Towles, Austin MacGinnis kick good	UK 28–0
2	0:54	UK	18-yard touchdown run by Mikel Horton, Austin MacGinnis kick good	UK 35–0
3	12:02	UK	18-yard touchdown run by Patrick Towles, Austin MacGinnis kick good	UK 42–0
3	6:10	UK	Austin MacGinnis 20-yard field goal good	UK 45–0
3	1:13	UK	Khalid Henderson 89-yard fumble recovery return, Austin MacGinnis kick good	UK 52–0
4	12:07	UTM	1-yard touchdown run by Najee Ray, Jackson Redditt kick good	UK 52–7
4	5:49	UTM	Caylon Weathers 15-yard touchdown pass from Jarod Neal, Jackson Redditt kick good	UK 52–14
4	4:13	UK	14-yard touchdown run by Mikel Horton, Austin MacGinnis kick good	UK 59–14

Statistics	UTM	UK
First downs	25	23
Total yards	398	656
Rushing yards	183	234
Passing yards	215	422
Turnovers	5	0
Time of possession	36:18	23:42

Team	Category	Player	Statistics
UT Martin	Passing	Jarod Neal	18/25, 173 yards, TD
UT Martin	Rushing	Abou Toure	17 rushes, 81 yards
UT Martin	Receiving	William Tanner	4 receptions, 61 yards
Kentucky	Passing	Patrick Towles	20/29, 377 yards, TD
Kentucky	Rushing	Braylon Heard	2 rushes, 116 yards, 2 TD
Kentucky	Receiving	Demarco Robinson	1 receptions, 79 yards

Braylon Heard's first-half touchdown runs of 73 and 43 yards spurred Kentucky to a season-opening, 59–14 rout of Tennessee–Martin on Saturday.

Quarterback Patrick Towles added a TD passing and running in his first career start for Kentucky, which outgained the Skyhawks 656–398. The Wildcats' sophomore threw for 370 yards, but Kentucky's tailbacks set the tone by flying through huge holes and scoring virtually untouched.

The Wildcats' improved grasp of the Air Raid offense was supposed to be displayed through the air behind Towles, who won a three-man competition for the starting job. He definitely did his part in completing 20 of 29 attempts without an interception, but the backfield rushed for 234 yards and ended up showing the scheme's big-play potential.

Heard demonstrated that on both TDs, blazing through big holes on consecutive drives to put Kentucky up 21–0 and keep the air raid sirens blaring.

Towles wasn't fazed about his tailbacks stealing the spotlight because of how well he managed the offense. The Kentucky native made good reads, avoided sacks by getting rid of the ball quickly and most importantly, showed that he could quickly hit short and long throws.

In between completions that moved the ball downfield, Towles hit several long ones to set up Kentucky scores. The first, a 44-yarder down the middle to Javess Blue, resulted in Kemp's 2-yard touchdown run soon after.

Towles followed with a 56-yard completion to Ryan Timmons to UTM's 39, a play that led to his 29-yard TD pass to freshman Blake Bone, who found a hole in the flat and then space en route to the end zone and a 28–0 lead.

Horton's 18-yard TD run came two plays after Towles' 36-yarder to Bone on the left sideline.

=== Ohio ===
Ohio at Kentucky

Team	1	2	3	4	Total
Bobcats	0	0	3	0	3
• Wildcats	14	3	3	0	20

- Date: September 6
- Location: Commonwealth Stadium
  Lexington, Kentucky
- Game start: 3:32 p.m. EST
- Elapsed time: 3:17
- Game attendance: 51,910
- Game weather: 86 °F (30 °C), Partly Cloudy, winds NW at 8 MPH
- Referee: Tom Ritter
- TV announcers (ESPNU/UK IMG): Clay Matvick & Anthony Becht (ESPNU) / Tom Leach & Jeff Piecoro (UK)

Scoring summary
1	11:27	UK	Dorian Baker 8-yard touchdown pass from Patrick Towles, Austin MacGinnis kick good	UK 7–0
1	8:24	UK	53-yard touchdown run by Stanley Williams, Austin MacGinnis kick good	UK 14–0
2	1:45	UK	Austin MacGinnis 53-yard field goal good	UK 17–0
3	12:12	OU	Josiah Yazdani 44-yard field goal good	UK 17–3
3	6:17	UK	Austin MacGinnis 33-yard field goal good	UK 20–3

Statistics	OHIO	UK
First downs	13	24
Total yards	223	402
Rushing yards	74	232
Passing yards	149	170
Turnovers	1	0
Time of possession	21:34	38:26

Team	Category	Player	Statistics
Ohio	Passing	J. D. Sprague	13/25, 143 yards
Ohio	Rushing	Dazmond Patterson	14 rushes, 44 yards
Ohio	Receiving	Brendan Cope	4 receptions, 57 yards
Kentucky	Passing	Patrick Towles	17/31, 170 yards, TD
Kentucky	Rushing	Stanley Williams	5 rushes, 60 yards, TD
Kentucky	Receiving	Ryan Timmons	10 receptions, 95 yards

Kentucky quarterback Patrick Towles threw for 170 yards and rushed for 59 more to lead the Wildcats to a 20–3 win over Ohio Saturday.

Towles completed 17 of 31 passes and one touchdown and led the Wildcats to their first 2–0 start since 2011. Although Kentucky's offense wasn't as explosive as last week's 59–14 rout of Tennessee Martin, it was enough to help the Wildcats avenge a 28–16 loss to the Bobcats in 2004.

Kentucky was without starting running back Braylon Heard who sat out because of a sprained ankle. Heard, a junior transfer from Nebraska, rushed for 116 yards and two touchdowns in the team's opener last week.

Jojo Kemp and freshman Boom Williams split time in the backfield in Heard's absence. Williams led the Wildcats with 60 yards rushing on five carries, including a 53-yard touchdown run with 8:24 remaining in the first quarter.

Towles had six rushes of 10 yards or more on 22 attempts, including a 16-yard jaunt in the second quarter. Towles made successful completions to four different receivers, with sophomore receiver Ryan Timmons catching 10 passes for 95 yards, both career highs.

Dorian Baker had two catches for 41 yards, including an 8-yard touchdown reception to open Kentucky's scoring with 3:33 remaining in the first quarter.

After two straight scoring drives to open the contest, Kentucky's offense managed just three points on its final four possessions of the first half. Towles completed 10 of 17 passes for 131 yards and one touchdown in the first two quarters. He added 46 yards on 13 carries.

=== At Florida ===
Kentucky at Florida

Team	1	2	3	4	OT	2OT	3OT	Total
Wildcats	0	3	14	3	7	3	0	30
• Gators	0	3	17	0	7	3	6	36

- Date: September 13
- Location: Ben Hill Griffin Stadium
  Gainesville, Florida
- Game start: 7:40 p.m. EST
- Elapsed time: 4:08
- Game attendance: 88,334
- Game weather: 86 °F (30 °C), Clear
- Referee: Marc Curles
- TV announcers (SEC Network/UK IMG): Brent Musburger, Jesse Palmer, & Maria Taylor (SECN)/Tom Leach & Jeff Van Note (UK)

Scoring summary
2	7:47	UF	Frankie Velez 35-yard field goal good	UF 3–0
2	0:00	UK	Austin MacGinnis 35-yard field goal good	Tied 3–3
3	7:32	UF	Velez 22-yard field goal good	UF 6–3
3	5:32	UK	Garrett Johnson 60-yard touchdown pass from Patrick Towles, MacGinnis kick good	UK 10–6
3	4:27	UK	Tevin Westbrook 10-yard touchdown pass from Jeff Driskel, Velez kick good	UF 13–10
3	3:21	UK	Johnson 33-yard touchdown pass from Towles, MacGinnis kick good	UK 17–13
3	4:27	UK	Demarcus Robinson 9-yard touchdown pass from Driskel, Velez kick good	UF 20–17
4	3:52	UK	MacGinnis 51-yard field goal good	Tied 20–20
OT	0:00	UK	Stanley Williams 25-yard touchdown pass from Towles, MacGinnis kick good	UK 27–20
OT	0:00	UF	Robinson 9-yard touchdown pass from Driskel, Velez kick good	Tied 27–27
2OT	0:00	UF	Velez 20-yard field goal good	UF 30–27
2OT	0:00	UK	MacGinnis 26-yard field goal good	Tied 30–30
3OT	0:00	UF	Matt Jones 1-yard touchdown run	UF 36–30

Statistics	UK	FLA
First downs	23	28
Total yards	450	532
Rushing yards	81	237
Passing yards	369	295
Turnovers	3	1
Time of possession	26:21	33:39

Team	Category	Player	Statistics
Kentucky	Passing	Patrick Towles	24/45, 369 yards, 3 TD, 3 INT
Kentucky	Rushing	Braylon Heard	12 rushes, 39 yards
Kentucky	Receiving	Garrett Johnson	6 receptions, 154 yards, 2 TD
Florida	Passing	Jeff Driskel	25/43, 295 yards, 3 TD, INT
Florida	Rushing	Matt Jones	29 rushes, 156 yards, TD
Florida	Receiving	Demarcus Robinson	15 receptions, 216 yards, 2 TD

Florida (2–0, 1–0 SEC) was an 18-point favorite in the game, no surprise given how lopsided the series has been. The Gators haven't lost to Kentucky (2–1, 0–1) since 1986 and haven't lost a game against the Wildcats at Florida Field since 1979.

The streak looked to be in jeopardy several times late in the SEC opener for both teams.

Matt Jones' 1-yard plunge in triple overtime gave Florida a 36–30 victory over Kentucky on Saturday night, extending the Gators' winning streak in the Southeastern Conference series to 28 games.

Kentucky's Austin MacGinnis, who hit a 51-yarder to tie the game late in the fourth quarter, missed a 41-yarder to start the third extra frame.

The play of the game was Florida's fourth-and-7 conversion in the first overtime. Jeff Driskel floated a ball to the back corner of the end zone and found Demarcus Robinson for a 9-yard score.

Robinson finished with 15 receptions for 216 yards and two scores. He tied Carlos Alvarez's school record for catches in a single game. No other Florida receiver caught more than two passes. Driskel completed 25 of 43 passes for 295 yards, with three touchdowns and an interception.

On Kentucky's first play of overtime, Stanley Williams reversed field, outran several tackles and scored from 25 yards out. The Gators struggled to answer, but eventually did on the fourth-down play.

The teams exchanged field goals in the second overtime. Florida could have found the end zone, but Driskel was late delivering the ball to Robinson near the front pylon.

Frankie Velez hit from 20-yard out to send it to the third extra frame.

Velez missed from 39 yards out in the fourth quarter that would have given Florida a little breathing room.

Austin Hardin, Florida's stronger-legged kicker, had a chance to win it regulation. But he pushed his 52-yarder wide right.

Florida trailed twice in the third quarter, falling behind 10–6 and then 17–13 on touchdown passes from Patrick Towles to Garrett Johnson.

Towles picked apart Florida's inexperienced secondary, throwing for 369 yards and three touchdowns. Johnson was his top target, finishing with six catches for 154 yards. He burned the Gators for a 60-yard touchdown, and then added a 33-yard score on the next drive.

=== Vanderbilt ===
Vanderbilt at Kentucky

Team	1	2	3	4	Total
Commodores	0	7	0	0	7
• Wildcats	7	10	0	0	17

- Date: September 27
- Location: Commonwealth Stadium
  Lexington, Kentucky
- Game start: 12:00 p.m. EST
- Elapsed time: 2:57
- Game attendance: 56940
- Game weather: 81 °F (27 °C), Clear
- Referee: Matt Loeffler
- TV announcers (SEC Network/UK IMG): Dave Neal, Andre Ware, & Laura Rutledge (SECN) / Tom Leach & Jeff Piecoro (UK)

Scoring summary
1	6:10	UK	Ryan Timmons 20-yard touchdown pass from Patrick Towles, Austin MacGinnis kick good	UK 7–0
2	10:19	VU	Darrius Sims 13-yard interception return, Tommy Openshaw kick good	Tied 7–7
2	6:09	UK	MacGinnis 44-yard field goal good	UK 10–0
2	0:09	UK	Towles 1-yard touchdown run, MacGinnis kick good	UK 17–7

Statistics	VAN	UK
First downs	8	23
Total yards	139	384
Rushing yards	54	183
Passing yards	85	201
Turnovers	3	3
Time of possession	21:27	38:33

Team	Category	Player	Statistics
Vanderbilt	Passing	Wade Freeback	8/25, 85 yards, 3 INT
Vanderbilt	Rushing	Ralph Webb	13 rushes, 44 yards
Vanderbilt	Receiving	C. J. Duncan	3 receptions, 48 yards
Kentucky	Passing	Patrick Towles	23/30, 201 yards, TD, INT
Kentucky	Rushing	Braylon Heard	15 rushes, 62 yards
Kentucky	Receiving	Stanley Williams	3 receptions, 39 yards

Patrick Towles threw a 20-yard touchdown pass and scored on a 1-yard run, and Kentucky made three fourth-quarter interceptions to hold off Vanderbilt 17–7 on Saturday to end a 17-game Southeastern Conference losing streak.

Though the Wildcats (3–1, 1–1) sent 56,940 away happy with their first conference win since November 2011 against Tennessee, there was no wild on-field celebration by Kentucky players after escaping the Commodores (1–4, 0–3). Coach Mark Stoops congratulated several players and shook hands with Vanderbilt coach Derek Mason before departing to cheers.

All of the game's scoring came in the first half with Towles doing the work with his arm and feet. He connected with Ryan Timmons to cap a 99-yard, 13-play opening drive, then followed Austin MacGinnis' 44-yard field goal with a 1-yard sneak just before halftime.

Kentucky's defense, particularly defensive back Marcus McWilson, A.J. Stamps and Ashely Lowery, kept the Commodores from scoring again with timely pickoffs. The Wildcats held the Commodores to just 57 second-half yards and 139 total, the fewest total yards Kentucky has given up to an SEC opponent since Vanderbilt had 91 in 1996.

Towles completed 23 of 30 passes for 201 of Kentucky's 384 yards but lost a fourth-quarter fumble and had a second-quarter interception returned 13 yards by Darrius Sims for Vanderbilt's only points. He was also sacked four times.

Despite Kentucky's inconsistent performance, the victory marked the program's first win against such an opponent in more than two years, following consecutive 2–10 seasons. Two weeks earlier, the Wildcats lost 36–30 to Florida in triple overtime.

That loss gave Kentucky its biggest crowd this season.

The Wildcats were even 17-point favorites against a Vanderbilt squad that had won the last three games in this series by a 100–14 margin. Though Kentucky didn't cover the spread, being favored spoke volumes about its improvement.

In fact, Kentucky's main concern was avoiding a letdown from the Florida game, especially coming off a bye. The Wildcats showed no effects from that disappointment or the break on their first drive as they drove 99 yards in 13 plays behind Towles' arm and feet.

Besides hitting his first nine passes for 77 yards, including the slant to Timmons for the TD, the sophomore extended the drive with a 21-yard keeper on third-and-11.

Towles completed another short pass before the costly interception to Sims, whose two kickoff returns for touchdowns last week against South Carolina resulted in preventive measures by Kentucky's special teams.

Towles recovered to lead Kentucky to 10 unanswered points by intermission but Kentucky didn't score again.

=== South Carolina ===
South Carolina at Kentucky

Team	1	2	3	4	Total
Gamecocks	7	10	14	7	38
• Wildcats	0	17	7	21	45

- Date: October 4
- Location: Commonwealth Stadium
  Lexington, Kentucky
- Game start: 7:39 p.m. EST
- Elapsed time: 3:33
- Game attendance: 62,135
- Game weather: 52 °F (11 °C), Partly Cloudy
- Referee: David Smith
- TV announcers (SEC Network/UK IMG): Tom Hart, Matt Stinchcomb, & Heather Mitts (SECN) / Tom Leach & Jeff Piecoro (UK)

Scoring summary
1	7:04	USC	Mike Davis 1-yard touchdown run, Elliott Fry kick good	USC 7–0
2	14:42	USC	Davis 2-yard touchdown run, Fry kick good	USC 14–0
2	9:15	UK	Jojo Kemp 3-yard touchdown run, Austin MacGinnis kick good	USC 14–7
2	4:45	USC	Elliott Fry 31-yard field goal good	USC 17–7
2	3:39	UK	Braylon Heard 38-yard touchdown run, MacGinnis kick good	USC 17–14
2	0:00	UK	MacGinnis 47-yard field goal good	Tied 17–17
3	11:45	UK	Ryan Timmons 48-yard touchdown pass from Patrick Towles, MacGinnis kick good	UK 24–17
3	9:40	USC	Pharoh Cooper 12-yard touchdown pass from Dylan Thompson, Fry kick good	USC 31–24
3	1:48	USC	Shon Carson 25-yard touchdown run, Fry kick good	Tied 24–24
4	11:45	USC	Davis 26-yard touchdown run, Fry kick good	USC 38–24
4	8:06	UK	Kemp 1-yard touchdown run, MacGinnis kick good	USC 38–31
4	2:46	UK	Kemp 5-yard touchdown run, MacGinnis kick good	Tied 38–38
4	2:29	UK	Bud Dupree 6-yard interception return, MacGinnis kick good	UK 45–38

Statistics	SCAR	UK
First downs	32	22
Total yards	500	447
Rushing yards	282	239
Passing yards	218	208
Turnovers	3	1
Time of possession	33:57	26:03

Team	Category	Player	Statistics
South Carolina	Passing	Dylan Thompson	23/37, 218 yards, TD, 3 INT
South Carolina	Rushing	Mike Davis	23 rushes, 183 yards, 3 TD
South Carolina	Receiving	Pharoh Cooper	6 receptions, 83 yards, TD
Kentucky	Passing	Patrick Towles	20/29, 208 yards, TD
Kentucky	Rushing	Jojo Kemp	17 rushes, 131 yards, 3 TD
Kentucky	Receiving	Ryan Timmons	5 receptions, 61 yards, TD

A late interception returned for a touchdown led the Kentucky football team to its biggest win of the Mark Stoops era with a 45–38 victory over South Carolina Saturday night at Commonwealth Stadium.

In front of 62,135, Patrick Towles threw for 208 yards and a touchdown and Jojo Kemp had 131 yards rushing and three scores – most of them out of the Wildcat formation – to lead the Wildcats to their second consecutive Southeastern Conference victory. Kentucky improved to 4–1 and 2–1 in league play, while South Carolina fell to 3–3 and 2–2 in the SEC.

UK has two conference wins for the first time since 2011, and won back-to-back SEC contests for the first time since 2006 when the Wildcats won three consecutive league outings.

Kentucky found itself down by two scores twice, but continued to battle back. It was the second time, early in the fourth quarter, having given up 21 unanswered points that was the game changer.

UK's offense found the end zone on consecutive drives following USC's final score, both Kemp touchdown runs, to tie the game at 38–38.

It was on South Carolina's possession after Kentucky tied the game that the UK defense made its biggest statement yet. With the Gamecocks on their own 20-yard line, Alvin "Bud" Dupree intercepted a tipped pass on the six-yard line. The senior went untouched into the end zone for the game-winning touchdown. UK's first interception returned for a score since 2009 gave the Wildcats a 45–38 lead with 2:29 left.

=== Louisiana-Monroe ===
Louisiana-Monroe at Kentucky

Team	1	2	3	4	Total
Warhawks	14	0	0	0	14
• Wildcats	3	21	21	3	48

- Date: October 11
- Location: Commonwealth Stadium
  Lexington, Kentucky
- Game start: 12:01 p.m. EST
- Elapsed time: 3:19
- Game attendance: 56,676
- Game weather: 54 °F (12 °C), Hazy
- Referee: David Smith
- TV announcers (SEC Network/UK IMG): Dave Neal, Andre Ware, & Laura Rutledge (SECN) / Tom Leach & Jeff Piecoro (UK)

Scoring summary
1	13:30	UK	Austin MacGinnis 37-yard field goal good	UK 3–0
1	7:36	ULM	Ajalen Holey 12-yard touchdown pass from Pete Thomas, Justin Manton kick good	ULM 7–3
1	0:00	ULM	Kenzee Jackson 9-yard touchdown pass from Thomas, Manton kick good	ULM 14–3
2	8:52	UK	Javess Blue 83-yard touchdown pass from Patrick Towles, MacGinnis kick good	ULM 14–10
2	7:47	UK	Josh Forrest 29-yard interception return, MacGinnis kick good	UK 17–14
2	4:08	UK	Blake Bone 4-yard touchdown pass from Towles, MacGinnis kick good	UK 24–14
3	7:17	UK	Blue 21-yard touchdown pass from Towles, MacGinnis kick good	UK 31–14
3	5:49	UK	Marcus McWilson 36-yard interception return, MacGinnis kick good	UK 38–14
3	4:07	UK	Stanley Williams 58-yard touchdown run, MacGinnis kick good	UK 45–14
4	14:10	UK	MacGinnis 30-yard field goal good	UK 48–14

Statistics	ULM	UK
First downs	15	15
Total yards	264	352
Rushing yards	77	136
Passing yards	187	216
Turnovers	3	1
Time of possession	35:08	24:52

Team	Category	Player	Statistics
Louisiana–Monroe	Passing	Pete Thomas	20/31, 167 yards, 2 TD, INT
Louisiana–Monroe	Rushing	Kaylon Watson	8 rushes, 32 yards
Louisiana–Monroe	Receiving	Kenzee Jackson	8 receptions, 73 yards, TD
Kentucky	Passing	Patrick Towles	16/28, 216 yards, 3 TD
Kentucky	Rushing	Stanley Williams	7 rushes, 104 yards, TD
Kentucky	Receiving	Javess Blue	3 receptions, 109 yards, 2 TD

Led by a strong defensive effort that included two interceptions returned for touchdowns, the Kentucky football team scored 45 unanswered points to defeat ULM, 48–14 Saturday afternoon in front of 56,676 fans on a crisp fall day at Commonwealth Stadium.

With the win, the Wildcats improved to 5–1 while the Warhawks fell to 3–3. UK, 5–1 for the first time since 2007 and just the seventh time since 1950, has won three consecutive games for the first time since the 2010 season.

UK overcame a slow start to eclipse 45 points for the third time in 2014, the most since 2010. All but three of those points came after Kentucky spotted ULM a 14–3 advantage in the first quarter.

The UK defense, which had two interceptions returned for touchdowns in a game for the first time since 1986, held the Warhawks to 187 yards passing and just 77 yards on the ground. ULM was forced to punt eight times and fumbled five times, one which Kentucky recovered.

Offensively, quarterback Patrick Towles was 16-of-28 for 216 yards and three touchdowns. Javess Blue caught three passes for 109 yards and two scores, while Blake Bone caught two for one touchdown. Towles' 83-yard touchdown pass to Blue was a career long for the sophomore quarterback.

On the ground, Stanley Williams rushed seven times for 104 yards and one touchdown, a 58-yarder in the third quarter. He also opened the game with a 75-yard kickoff return to set up UK's first score of the game.

Kentucky entered the second quarter trailing 14–3, but after the UK defense forced ULM to punt with just over five minutes remaining in the quarter the Wildcats quickly began to cut away at the deficit. Towles hit Blue for an 83-yard touchdown pass, the longest play of the season for Kentucky, to bring UK within four.

On the very next ULM drive, Josh Forrest returned an interception 29 yards to give UK a 17–14 lead. The pick-six marked the second time in as many weeks the Wildcat defense returned the game-winning score for a touchdown.

On the game's opening drive, Austin MacGinnis hit a 37-yard field goal to give UK a 3–0 lead, the third time in six games in 2014 that Kentucky has scored on its first drive of the contest.

Following Forrest's pick-six that resulted in the go-ahead score, the UK defense forced ULM into a three-and-out, and six plays later, Blake Bone caught a four-yard touchdown pass from Towles to give UK a 24–14 lead. Boone's second touchdown catch of the season with 4:08 left in the half capped a six play, 44-yard drive.

On Kentucky's second drive of the second half, after the UK defense forced ULM into back-to-back three-and-outs, Blue hauled in a 21-yard pass from Towles for the score to give the Wildcats a 31–14 lead. The touchdown catch, Blue's second of the game, capped a four-play, 30-yard drive.

ULM's next drive resulted in another interception for the Wildcat defense. Marcus McWilson, with the 36-yard interception returned for a touchdown, gave UK a 38–14 lead and its fourth defensive score of the season. It marked the first time since 2008 that UK returned two turnovers for touchdowns, while the four defensive touchdowns was also the most since 2008.

=== At LSU ===
Kentucky at LSU

Team	1	2	3	4	Total
Wildcats	3	0	0	0	3
• Tigers	17	10	14	0	41

- Date: October 18
- Location: Tiger Stadium
  Baton Rouge, Louisiana
- Game start: 7:39 p.m. EST
- Elapsed time: 3:24
- Game attendance: 101,581
- Game weather: 78 °F (26 °C), Clear
- Referee: Penn Wagers
- TV announcers (SEC Network/UK IMG): Brent Musburger, Jesse Palmer, & Maria Taylor (SECN) / Tom Leach & Jeff Piecoro (UK)

Scoring summary
1	12:09	LSU	Leonard Fournette 1-yard touchdown run, Colby Delahoussaye kick good	LSU 7–0
1	7:36	LSU	Delahoussaye 21-yard field goal good	LSU 10–0
1	5:47	LSU	Tre'Davious White 67-yard punt return, Delahoussaye kick good	LSU 17–0
1	1:15	UK	Austin MacGinnis 33-yard field goal good	LSU 17–3
2	0:44	LSU	Travin Dural 32-yard touchdown pass from Anthony Jennings, Delahoussaye kick good	LSU 24–3
2	0:07	LSU	Delahoussaye 21-yard field goal good	LSU 27–3
3	10:37	LSU	Terrence Magee 9-yard touchdown run, Delahoussaye kick good	LSU 34–3
3	3:27	LSU	Magee 23-yard touchdown run, Delahoussaye kick good	LSU 41–3

Statistics	UK	LSU
First downs	12	20
Total yards	217	423
Rushing yards	71	303
Passing yards	146	120
Turnovers	0	1
Time of possession	26:41	32:56

Team	Category	Player	Statistics
Kentucky	Passing	Patrick Towles	19/36, 146 yards
Kentucky	Rushing	Mikel Horton	5 rushes, 29 yards
Kentucky	Receiving	Demarco Robinson	3 receptions, 52 yards
LSU	Passing	Anthony Jennings	7/14, 120 yards, TD
LSU	Rushing	Terrence Magee	9 rushes, 127 yards, 2 TD
LSU	Receiving	Terrence Magee	3 receptions, 44 yards

Facing arguably its toughest test of the season, the Kentucky football team suffered a 41–3 loss to LSU Saturday night in front of 101,581 at Tiger Stadium.

The Wildcats (5–2, 2–2 Southeastern Conference) were held to 217 yards offensively, with 146 coming through the air and 71 rushing yards. The Tigers (6–2, 2–2 SEC) had 423 total yards, including 303 on the ground and 120 passing.

Kentucky returns home Saturday, where it is a perfect 5–0 in 2014, to face No. 1 Mississippi State Saturday at 3:30 p.m. ET. The Wildcats will look to become bowl eligible with their sixth win of the season for the first time since 2010. UK's matchup with the top-ranked Bulldogs will air live on CBS and on the UK Radio Network.

UK quarterback Patrick Towles was 19–36 for 146 yards in addition to 16 yards rushing on seven attempts. Demarco Robinson caught three passes for 52 yards, including one for 33 yards, while Ryan Timmons had four catches for 24 yards.

On the ground, Mikel Horton led Kentucky with 29 yards while Stanley Boom Williams had seven rushes for 19 yards.

Defensively, three Wildcats had 10 tackles apiece. Marcus McWilson had an interception, his third pick of the season, along with a career-best 10 tackles. Za'Darius Smith added a sack.

LSU's offensive production was led by Terrence Magee, who ran for 127 yards and two touchdowns in addition to hauling in three passes for 44 yards. Quarterback Anthony Jennings was 7–14 for 120 yards and one touchdown.

The Tigers' Tre'Davious White also returned a 67-yard punt for a touchdown in the first quarter.

Kentucky got on the board with 1:15 left in the first quarter on an Austin MacGinnis 33-yard field goal to cut LSU's lead to 17–3. The score capped a 13-play, 66-yard drive for the Wildcat offense.

LSU scored on the game's opening drive to give the Tigers an early 7–0 lead. The touchdown marked just the second time this season that UK has allowed a game-opening touchdown drive by its opponent.

After the Tigers scored on their opening drive, they proceeded to score on their next two drives as well, with a field goal and a touchdown to lead 17–0. After UK's field goal to cut the deficit to 14, LSU was stopped on its three drives before scoring 10 points in the final minute to go ahead 27–3 at the half.

The halftime deficit was the first time this season UK has trailed after 30 minutes.

The Tigers scored two touchdowns in the third quarter, both Magee runs, for the final scores of the contest.

=== No. 1 Mississippi State ===
No. 1 Mississippi State at Kentucky

Team	1	2	3	4	Total
• No. 1 Bulldogs	10	7	14	14	45
Wildcats	7	3	14	7	31

- Date: October 25
- Location: Commonwealth Stadium
  Lexington, Kentucky
- Game start: 3:40 p.m. EST
- Elapsed time: 3:37
- Game attendance: 64,791
- Game weather: 72 °F (22 °C), Clear
- Referee: Hubert Owens
- TV announcers (CBS/UK IMG): Verne Lundquist, Gary Danielson, & Allie LaForce (CBS) / Tom Leach & Jeff Piecoro (UK)

Scoring summary
1	8:38	MSU	Josh Robinson 12-yard touchdown run, Evan Sobiesk kick good	MSU 7–0
1	6:25	UK	Demarco Robinson 67-yard touchdown pass from Patrick Towles, Austin MacGinnis kick good	Tied 7–7
1	2:41	MSU	Sobbiesk 26-yard field goal good	MSU 10–7
2	11:54	MSU	Dak Prescott 2-yard touchdown run, Sobiesk kick good	MSU 17–7
2	6:18	UK	MacGinnis 34-yard field goal good	MSU 17–10
3	11:54	MSU	Prescott 11-yard touchdown run, Sobiesk kick good	MSU 24–10
3	8:33	UK	Towles 10-yard touchdown run, MacGinnis kick good	MSU 24–17
3	4:44	MSU	Brandon Hill 8-yard touchdown pass from Prescott, Sobiesk kick good	MSU 31–17
3	3:32	UK	Javess Blue 58-yard touchdown pass from Towles, MacGinnis kick good	MSU 31–24
4	11:47	MSU	Robinson 73-yard touchdown run, Sobiesk kick good	MSU 38–24
4	2:31	UK	Towles 4-yard touchdown run, MacGinnis kick good	MSU 38–31
4	2:22	MSU	Christian Holmes 61-yard kickoff return for touchdown, Sobiesk kick good	MSU 45–31

Statistics	MSST	UK
First downs	30	23
Total yards	542	504
Rushing yards	326	103
Passing yards	216	401
Turnovers	1	1
Time of possession	34:07	25:53

Team	Category	Player	Statistics
Mississippi State	Passing	Dak Prescott	18/33, 216 yards, TD, INT
Mississippi State	Rushing	Josh Robinson	23 rushes, 198 yards, 2 TD
Mississippi State	Receiving	Fred Ross	5 receptions, 51 yards
Kentucky	Passing	Patrick Towles	24/43, 390 yards, 2 TD
Kentucky	Rushing	Patrick Towles	23 rushes, 76 yards, 2 TD
Kentucky	Receiving	Ryan Timmons	5 receptions, 114 yards

A career-outing by sophomore quarterback Patrick Towles was not enough for Kentucky to pull off an upset of visiting No. 1 Mississippi State on Saturday night in front of a season-high 64,791 rabid fans in Commonwealth Stadium. Towles' career-high numbers included touchdowns (4), passing yards (390), and rushing yards (76) in the first meeting at home against a No. 1 foe since UK upset LSU in three-overtimes in 2007.

Towles was 24-of-43 for 390 yards with two touchdowns through the air, while connecting with nine different receivers. The Ft. Thomas, Ky., native logged 76 yards on 23 attempts and a pair of scores on the ground which included a career-long rush of 48 yards in the third quarter. Towles accounted for four plays of more than 40 yards including a pair of touchdown tosses that went for 58 yards or longer.

Senior Alvin "Bud" Dupree led the defensive charge with 10 total tackles. He accounted for 1.5 tackles for a loss including a sack in the second quarter. Dupree is six sacks shy of becoming UK's all-time career leader in that category. He also had a team-high two quarterback hurries.

The Bulldogs were led by quarterback Dak Prescott who passed for 216 yards and a touchdown. He added 88 rushing yards and a pair of scores. Running back Josh Robinson rushed for 198 yards and two touchdowns.

After Mississippi State drove 82-yards for a touchdown on its first possession, the Wildcats utilized a five-play 78-yard drive to counter the No. 1 team in the country. Towles found senior Demarco Robinson on a curl route to the sidelines, and he tip-toed the sideline before racing 67 yards for the score. The touchdown haul was the first of the year for Robinson and the third of his career.

Kentucky's defense forced a three-and-out on the Bulldogs' next drive, but suffered a fumble at its own 19-yard line on its second play giving the ball back to State. UK's defense limited the Bulldogs to a 26-yard field goal giving the visitors a 10–7 lead with 2:41 remaining in the opening quarter.

Mississippi State started the second quarter by going 68 yards over 10 plays capped by a two-yard plunge by Prescott to lift the Bulldogs to a 17–7 advantage. Kentucky answered with a 12-play, 58-yard drive of its own which ended in a 34-yard field goal by freshman Austin MacGinnis.

With the Bulldogs driving late in the half, Dupree applied pressure to Prescott forcing a tipped pass that was intercepted by Josh Forrest with under a minute to play in the half. It was the third interception of the season by UK's middle linebacker. UK drove to State's 40-yard line and attempted a 50-yard field goal to end the half, but it missed wide right.

Mississippi State began the second half with an 11-play, 75-yard scoring drive to take a 24–10 lead. Prescott scampered 12-yards for the score, his second rushing TD of the game.

The Wildcats answered with an eight-play, 86-yard scoring drive. A career-long 48-yard dash by Towles highlighted the drive. The QB scurried for a 10-yard score on third down to make it 24–17 in favor of the visitors with 8:33 remaining in the third quarter. It marked the third time in Towles' career that he rushed and threw for at least one touchdown.

=== Missouri ===
Kentucky at Missouri

Team	1	2	3	4	Total
Wildcats	0	3	0	7	10
• Tigers	0	14	3	3	20

- Date: November 1
- Location: Faurot Field
  Columbia, Missouri
- Game start: 4:01 p.m. EST
- Elapsed time: 3:20
- Game attendance: 62,004
- Game weather: 48 °F (9 °C), Mostly Sunny
- Referee: Penn Wagers
- TV announcers (SEC Network/UK IMG): Brent Musburger, Jesse Palmer, & Maria Taylor (SEC) / Tom Leach & Jeff Piecoro (UK)

Scoring summary
2	12:56	MU	Bud Sasser 3-yard pass from Maty Mauk, Andrew Baggett kick good	MU 7–0
2	9:35	UK	Austin MacGinnis 47-yard field goal good	MU 7–3
2	5:26	MU	Sasser 26-yard pass from Mauk, Baggett kick good	MU 14–3
3	3:42	MU	Baggett 41-yard field goal good	MU 17–3
4	7:23	MU	Baggett 21-yard field goal good	MU 20–3
4	3:26	UK	Javess Blue 1-yard touchdown pass from Patrick Towles, MacGinnis kick good	MU 20–10

Statistics	UK	MIZ
First downs	14	21
Total yards	260	320
Rushing yards	102	156
Passing yards	158	164
Turnovers	1	0
Time of possession	25:29	34:31

Team	Category	Player	Statistics
Kentucky	Passing	Patrick Towles	19/36, 158 yards, TD, INT
Kentucky	Rushing	Mikel Horton	10 rushes, 62 yards
Kentucky	Receiving	Stanley Williams	5 receptions, 58 yards
Missouri	Passing	Maty Mauk	18/33, 164 yards, 2 TD
Missouri	Rushing	Maty Mauk	14 rushes, 75 yards
Missouri	Receiving	Bud Sasser	6 receptions, 67 yards, 2 TD

The Kentucky football team's late-game comeback fell two scores short in a 20–10 loss at Missouri Saturday afternoon at Faurot Field.

Kentucky's touchdown came with 7:18 left in the game following a Missouri field goal. The Wildcats' 12-play, 8-yard drive was capped by a Javess Blue 1-yard touchdown pass from sophomore Patrick Towles. The score cut UK's deficit to 10 at 20–10.

The Kentucky defense held Missouri to 320 total yards. Junior linebacker Josh Forrest forced his first career fumble and led UK with 10 tackles and two tackles for loss. Senior DE/LB Alvin "Bud" Dupree finished with five tackles, a career-high 2.5 tackles and 1.5 sacks.

Offensively, Towles was 19–37 for 158 yards with one touchdown and an interception. Towles hit freshman Stanley "Boom" Williams five times for 58 yards, including a long of 32 yards. Freshman Mikel Horton led UK on the ground with 62 yards on 10 attempts.

After both teams punted twice to open the game, Missouri got on the board first with a 3-yard touchdown pass with 12:56 left in the second quarter. On the following drive, freshman Austin MacGinnis hit a 47-yard field goal to cap a four-play, 45-yard drive.

Mizzou answered on its next drive with another touchdown, a 26-yard pass from quarterback Bud Sasser, to take a 14–3 lead. The Tigers got on the board again late in the third quarter with a 41-yard field goal before another field goal with 7:23 left in the fourth quarter to make it 20–3.

=== No. 20 Georgia ===
No. 20 Georgia at Kentucky

Team	1	2	3	4	Total
• No. 20 Bulldogs	21	14	21	7	63
Wildcats	0	24	0	7	31

- Date: November 1
- Location: Commonwealth Stadium
  Lexington, Kentucky
- Game start: 12:01 p.m. EST
- Elapsed time: 3:17
- Game attendance: 62,004
- Game weather: 52 °F (11 °C), Mostly Sunny
- Referee: Penn Wagers
- TV announcers (ESPN/UK IMG): Dave Pasch, Brian Griese, & Tom Luginbill (ESPN) / Tom Leach & Jeff Piecoro (UK)

Statistics	UGA	UK
First downs	28	22
Total yards	559	353
Rushing yards	305	214
Passing yards	254	139
Turnovers	1	1
Time of possession	26:22	33:38

Team	Category	Player	Statistics
Georgia	Passing	Hutson Mason	13/16, 174 yards, 4 TD
Georgia	Rushing	Nick Chubb	13 rushes, 170 yards, TD
Georgia	Receiving	Jonathon Rumph	4 receptions, 81 yards
Kentucky	Passing	Patrick Towles	16/31, 139 yards, TD, INT
Kentucky	Rushing	Stanley Williams	9 rushes, 98 yards, TD
Kentucky	Receiving	Demarco Robinson	5 receptions, 43 yards

The Kentucky football team was unable to overcome an early 21–0 deficit in a 63–31 loss to No. 17 Georgia in UK's final home contest Commonwealth Stadium of the 2014 season.

The Wildcats trailed the Bulldogs 21–0 just 10 minutes into the game, but quickly rallied back to score 24 second-quarter points to trail 35–24 at halftime. Georgia scored four unanswered touchdowns in the second half to extend its lead and clinch the verdict. UK second-quarter spurt began with a three-yard touchdown run by Braylon Heard. Heard's rush capped a 16-play, 74-yard drive that took 6:15, UK's longest scoring drive of the year in number of plays and time of possession. On the ensuing kickoff, Georgia could not gain control of the ball, and UK's J.D. Harmon recovered to give the Wildcats possession on UGA's 23-yard line. Eight plays later, Austin MacGinnis hit a 38-yard field goal.

The Bulldogs scored a touchdown on their next drive, but the Wildcats answered. On the third play of the drive, Stanley "Boom" Williams found a hole and ran for a 56-yard touchdown. Williams finished the day with exactly 100 rushing yards, his second game of the season at the century mark. UK's next possession featured a 13-play, 75-yard touchdown drive capped by a 1-yard quarterback sneak by Patrick Towles. On the day, Towles passes for 139 yards, including a 9-yard TD to Javess Blue in the fourth quarter, and the UK QB also rushed for 60 net yards.

Georgia quarterback Hutson Mason threw for 174 yards and four touchdowns while tailback Nick Chubb led all rushers with 170 yards and a TD. Isaiah McKenzie returned a kickoff and a punt for touchdowns.

=== At Tennessee ===
Kentucky Wildcats at Tennessee Volunteers – Game summary

Quarter	1	2	3	4	Total
Wildcats	3	10	3	0	16
Volunteers	14	19	17	0	50

at Neyland Stadium • Knoxville, Tennessee

- Date: November 15
- Game time: 4:01 p.m. EST
- Game weather: Temperature: 43 °F (6 °C) • Wind: ESE at 3 miles per hour (4.8 km/h) • Weather: clear
- Game attendance: 102,455
- Referee: Referee: Tom Ritter • Umpire: Stan Weihe • Linesman: Johnny Crawford • Line judge: Tim Beard • Back judge: Dax Hill • Field judge: James Carter • Side judge: Chuck Russ
- TV announcers (SEC Network): Tom Hart (play-by-play), Matt Stinchcomb (color commentator), & Heather Mitts (sideline reporter)

Game information

First quarter

- UK Austin MacGinnis 32-yard field goal, 10:38. Cats 3–0. Drive: 12 plays, 77 yards, 4:22.
- UT Von Pearson 21-yard pass from Joshua Dobbs (Aaron Medley kick), 9:11. Vols 7–3. Drive: 5 plays, 73 yards, 1:27.
- UT Brian Randolph 23-yard interception return (Aaron Medley kick), 5:07. Vols 14–3. Drive: 0 plays, 23 yards, 0:00.

Second quarter

- UT Von Pearson 16-yard pass from Joshua Dobbs (Aaron Medley kick failed), 13:21. Vols 20–3. Drive: 14 plays, 66 yards, 5:00.
- UT Aaron Medley 38-yard field goal, 8:31. Vols 23–3. Drive: 10 plays, 39 yards, 3:47.
- UT Joshua Dobbs 9-yard run (Aaron Medley kick), 4:09. Vols 30–3. Drive: 7 plays, 50 yards, 2:37.
- UK Patrick Towles 2-yard run (Austin MacGinnis kick), 1:27. Vols 30–10. Drive: 8 plays, 76 yards, 2:42.
- UT Aaron Medley 21-yard field goal, 0:14. Vols 33–10. Drive: 7 plays, 66 yards, 1:13.
- UK Austin MacGinnis 54-yard field goal, 0:00. Vols 33–13. Drive: 2 plays, 23 yards, 0:14.

Third quarter

- UT Jason Croom 52-yard pass from Joshua Dobbs (Aaron Medley kick), 14:44. Vols 40–13. Drive: 1 play, 52 yards, 0:16.
- UK Austin MacGinnis 30-yard field goal, 11:40. Vols 40–16. Drive: 10 plays, 64 yards, 3:04.
- UT Aaron Medley 39-yard field goal, 3:17. Vols 43–16. Drive: 8 plays, 35 yards, 3:04.
- UT Jalen Hurd 4-yard run (Aaron Medley kick), 0:20. Vols 50–16. Drive: 4 plays, 19 yards, 1:28.

Fourth quarter

- No scoring plays

Statistics	UK	TENN
First downs	15	28
Total yards	262	511
Rushing yards	94	214
Passing yards	168	297
Turnovers	2	0
Time of possession	26:19	33:41

Team	Category	Player	Statistics
Kentucky	Passing	Patrick Towles	13/25, 168 yards, INT
Kentucky	Rushing	Patrick Towles	14 rushes, 29 yards, TD
Kentucky	Receiving	Javess Blue	6 receptions, 131 yards
Tennessee	Passing	Joshua Dobbs	19/27, 297 yards, 3 TD
Tennessee	Rushing	Jalen Hurd	24 rushes, 118 yards, TD
Tennessee	Receiving	Jason Croom	3 receptions, 87 yards, TD

=== At No. 22 Louisville ===
Kentucky Wildcats at No. 22 Louisville Cardinals – Game summary

Quarter	1	2	3	4	Total
Wildcats	6	14	3	17	40
No. 22 Cardinals	0	21	7	16	44

at Papa John's Cardinal Stadium • Louisville, Kentucky

- Date: November 29
- Game time: 12:00PM EST
- Game attendance: 55,118
- TV announcers (ESPN2): Beth Mowins, Joey Galloway, & Paul Carcaterra

Statistics	UK	LOU
First downs	14	22
Total yards	327	472
Rushing yards	151	83
Passing yards	176	389
Turnovers	2	4
Time of possession	28:54	31:06

Team	Category	Player	Statistics
Kentucky	Passing	Patrick Towles	14/29, 176 yards, 2 INT
Kentucky	Rushing	Stanley Williams	18 rushes, 126 yards, 2 TD
Kentucky	Receiving	Demarco Robinson	2 receptions, 59 yards
Louisville	Passing	Kyle Bolin	21/31, 381 yards, 3 TD, INT
Louisville	Rushing	Brandon Radcliff	21 rushes, 67 yards, 2 TD
Louisville	Receiving	DeVante Parker	6 receptions, 180 yards, 3 TD

== Team statistics ==
	UK	OPP
Scoring	253	198
Points per game	31.6	24.8
First downs	166	171
Rushing	72	87
Passing	83	72
Penalty	11	12
Rushing yardage	1,279	1,536
Rushing attempts	287	337
Avg per rush	4.5	4.6
Avg per game	159.9	192.0
TDs Rushing	15	13
Passing Yardage	2,133	1,485
Comp-Att-Int	166–279–5	140–259–13
Avg per game	266.6	185.6
TDs Passing	12	9

	UK	OPP
Total offense	3,412	3,021
Avg per play	6.0	5.1
Avg per game	426.5	377.6
Fumbles–Lost	16–4	17–5
Penalties–Yards	45–434	43–361
Avg per game	54.2	45.1
Punts–Yards	40–1,690	46–2,022
Avg per punt	42.2	44.0
Time of possession/Game	28:44	31:16
3rd down conversions	45/119	47/121
4th down conversions	4/12	7/11
Touchdowns scored	31	25
Field goals–Attempts	12–18	8–13
PAT–Attempts	31–31	24–24
Attendance	342,850	189,915
Games/Avg per Game	57,142	94,958
