= 2014 Belk Bowl =

- 13th Belk Bowl
Georgia Bulldogs	Louisville Cardinals
(9–3)	(9–3)
SEC	ACC
37	14
Head coach: Mark Richt	Head coach: Bobby Petrino
AP / Coaches / CFP; 13 / 13 / 13	AP / Coaches / CFP; 20 / 20 / 21
	1	2	3	4	Total
Georgia	7	13	7	10	37
Louisville	7	0	7	0	14
- Date: December 30, 2014
- Season: 2014
- Stadium: Bank of America Stadium
- Location: Charlotte, North Carolina
- MVP: Georgia RB Nick Chubb
- Favorite: Georgia by 7
- National anthem: Gabbie McGee
- Referee: David Witvoet (Big Ten)
- Attendance: 45,671
- Payout: US$1,700,000

United States TV coverage
- Network: ESPN/ESPN Radio
- Announcers: Anish Shroff, Kelly Stouffer, & Cara Capuano (ESPN); Tom Hart, Matt Stinchcomb, & Heather Mitts (ESPN Radio)

The 2014 Belk Bowl was a college football bowl game that was played on December 30, 2014, at Bank of America Stadium in Charlotte, North Carolina in the United States. The thirteenth annual Belk Bowl, it matched the Georgia Bulldogs of the Southeastern Conference against the Louisville Cardinals of the Atlantic Coast Conference. The game started at 6:45 p.m. EST and aired on ESPN. It was one of the 2014–15 bowl games played at the conclusion of the 2014 FBS football season. The game was sponsored by Charlotte-based department store chain Belk. The Bulldogs won the matchup by a final score of 37–14.

== Teams ==
The game featured the Georgia Bulldogs of the Southeastern Conference against the Louisville Cardinals of the Atlantic Coast Conference. Georgia was runner-up in the SEC Eastern Division, whereas Louisville was third in the ACC Atlantic Division.

The game represented the first overall meeting between these two teams.

=== Georgia Bulldogs ===
After finishing their regular season with a 9–3 record, the Bulldogs accepted their invitation to play in the game.

Georgia became the first representative of the SEC to ever play in the Belk Bowl. In addition to this being Georgia's first Belk Bowl, it was also the Bulldogs' 50th bowl game in program history.

=== Louisville Cardinals ===
After finishing their regular season with a 9–3 record, the Cardinals accepted their invitation to play in the game.

The game was Louisville's second Belk Bowl; before they joined the ACC, the Cardinals played in the 2011 game (the first under the Belk name and sponsorship), losing to the NC State Wolfpack by a score of 31–24.

== Game summary ==
=== Scoring summary ===
Scoring summary

Quarter	Time	Drive			Team	Scoring information	Score	
Quarter	Time	Plays	Yards	TOP	Team	Scoring information	UGA	LOU
1	8:24	8	90	3:16	UGA	Chris Conley 45-yard touchdown reception from Hutson Mason, Marshall Morgan kick good	7	0
1	4:25	9	84	3:59	LOU	Gerald Christian 12-yard touchdown reception from Kyle Bolin, John Wallace kick good	7	7
2	11:33	9	43	2:30	UGA	41-yard field goal by Morgan	10	7
2	6:40	7	76	2:19	UGA	Nick Chubb 31-yard touchdown run, Morgan kick good	17	7
2	4:58	4	4	1:23	UGA	22-yard field goal by Morgan	20	7
3	5:41	3	97	0:57	UGA	Sony Michel 2-yard touchdown run, Morgan kick good	27	7
3	1:48	10	70	3:53	LOU	Brandon Radcliff 6-yard touchdown run, Wallace kick good	27	14
4	5:20	9	43	4:13	UGA	41-yard field goal by Morgan	30	14
4	2:02	4	45	2:16	UGA	Chubb 8-yard touchdown run, Morgan kick good	37	14
"TOP" = time of possession. For other American football terms, see Glossary of American football.							37	14

=== Statistics ===
Statistics	UGA	LOU
First downs	22	20
Plays–yards	77–490	71–380
Rushes–yards	53–291	27–65
Passing yards	199	315
Passing: Comp–Att–Int	14–24–1	21–44–3
Time of possession	33:00	27:00

== Records ==
According to UGA, "Nick Chubb was named the Belk Bowl MVP and finished with 269 yards and two touchdowns on 33 carries. His 269 yards was a career-high, SEC bowl record, marked his eighth-straight 100-yard rushing game and was the second-highest single game rushing total in Georgia history." Also, a 41-yard field goal by Marshall Morgan that gave the Bulldogs a 30–14 lead set a single-season record for Georgia in points scored. Including the bowl game, UGA scored 537 points over the course of the season.

Chubb also set three Belk Bowl records: rushing attempts, rushing yards, and "Longest Non-Scoring Run" (82 yards).
