= Patrick Towles =

American football quarterback

No. 8, 14
- Position: Quarterback

Personal information
- Born: Bellevue, Kentucky, U.S.
- Listed height: 6 ft 5 in (1.96 m)
- Listed weight: 253 lb (115 kg)

Career information
- High school: Highlands (Fort Thomas, Kentucky)
- College: Kentucky (2012–2015); Boston College (2016)
- Stats at ESPN

Patrick Williams Towles is an American former college football quarterback. He played for the Kentucky Wildcats and Boston College Eagles.

== Early life ==
Towles attended Highlands High School in Fort Thomas, Kentucky. As a senior, he threw for 3,820 yards and 42 touchdowns while also rushing for 589 yards and 15 touchdowns. As a result of his performance, he was named the Gatorade Kentucky Football Player of the Year and Kentucky Mr. Football. A four-star recruit, he committed to play college football at the University of Kentucky.

== College career ==
As a freshman in 2012, Towles appeared in five games, throwing for 233 yards and a touchdown, before redshirting in 2013. Entering the 2014 season, he was named the Wildcats' starting quarterback. In his first career start against UT Martin, Towles completed 20 passes for 377 yards and a touchdown, leading the Wildcats to a 59−14 victory. Against top-ranked Mississippi State, he threw for a career-high 390 yards and two touchdowns, while also rushing for 76 yards and two touchdowns. Towles started in all 12 games in 2014, accounting for 2,718 yards passing and 14 touchdowns while also rushing for 303 yards and six touchdowns. He was once again named Kentucky's starting quarterback entering the 2015 season. Towles started in ten games, throwing for 2,148 yards, nine touchdowns, and 14 interceptions. Following the conclusion of the season, he decided to transfer.

Prior to the 2016 season, Towles transferred to Boston College to play for the Boston College Eagles. He was named the Eagles' starting quarterback prior to the season opener against Georgia Tech. In his final career game against Maryland in the 2016 Quick Lane Bowl, he recorded 151 passing yards with two touchdowns, leading the Eagles to a 36−30 victory. Towles finished his final season totaling 1,730 passing yards, 12 touchdowns, and seven interceptions.

=== Statistics ===
Season	Team	Games			Passing								Rushing			
Season	Team	GP	GS	Record	Cmp	Att	Pct	Yds	Avg	TD	Int	Rtg	Att	Yds	Avg	TD
2012	Kentucky	5	0	0–0	19	40	47.5	233	5.8	1	1	99.7	11	-14	-1.3	0
2013	Kentucky	Redshirted (redshirt)														
2014	Kentucky	12	12	5–7	225	393	57.3	2,718	6.9	14	9	122.5	145	303	2.1	6
2015	Kentucky	11	10	4–6	183	326	56.1	2,148	6.6	9	14	112.0	71	64	0.9	5
2016	Boston College	13	13	7–6	138	273	50.5	1,730	6.3	12	7	113.2	115	294	2.6	4
Career		41	35	16−19	565	1,032	54.7	6,829	6.6	36	31	115.8	342	647	1.9	15

== Professional career ==
After going undrafted in the 2017 NFL draft, Towles earned a tryout with the Houston Texans.

== Personal life ==
Following his football career, Towles became a missionary with the Fellowship of Catholic University Students.

Towles is the grandson of the late Hall of Fame professional baseball pitcher and United States Senator, Jim Bunning.
