= 2014 Georgia Bulldogs football team =

American college football season

2014 Georgia Bulldogs football

Belk Bowl champion

Belk Bowl, W 37–14 vs. Louisville
- Conference: Southeastern Conference
- Eastern Division

Ranking
- Coaches: No. 9
- AP: No. 9
- Record: 10–3 (6–2 SEC)
- Head coach: Mark Richt (14th season)
- Offensive coordinator: Mike Bobo (8th season)
- Offensive scheme: Pro-style
- Defensive coordinator: Jeremy Pruitt (1st season)
- Base defense: 3–4
- Home stadium: Sanford Stadium

2014 Southeastern Conference football standings
	Conf.			Overall
Team	W		L	W		L
Eastern Division
No. 14 Missouri x	7	–	1	11	–	3
No. 9 Georgia	6	–	2	10	–	3
Florida	4	–	4	7	–	5
Tennessee	3	–	5	7	–	6
South Carolina	3	–	5	7	–	6
Kentucky	2	–	6	5	–	7
Vanderbilt	0	–	8	3	–	9
Western Division
No. 4 Alabama x$^	7	–	1	12	–	2
No. 11 Mississippi State	6	–	2	10	–	3
No. 17 Ole Miss *	5	–	3	9	–	4
No. 22 Auburn	4	–	4	8	–	5
LSU *	4	–	4	8	–	5
Texas A&M	3	–	5	8	–	5
Arkansas	2	–	6	7	–	6
Championship: Alabama 42, Missouri 13
^ – College Football Playoff participant; $ – Conference champion; x – Division champion/co-champions; * LSU and Ole Miss vacated all wins (except for Ole Miss' win over Presbyterian) due to NCAA violations.; Rankings from AP Poll

The 2014 Georgia Bulldogs football team represented the University of Georgia in the 2014 NCAA Division I FBS football season. They were led by head coach Mark Richt, who was in his 14th year as head coach. The Bulldogs played their home games at Sanford Stadium. They were a member of the Eastern Division of the Southeastern Conference (SEC). Georgia finished the season with a 10–3 overall record, 6–2 in SEC play placing second place in the East Division. They earned an invitation to play in the Belk Bowl against the Louisville Cardinals, which they won, 37–14.

== Coaching changes ==
On January 12 defensive coordinator Todd Grantham left to take the same position at Louisville under Bobby Petrino. On January 14, Georgia hired Jeremy Pruitt as their new defensive coordinator. Pruitt came from Florida State where they were the national champions in 2013. Pruitt had been a part of the previous three national championships as a coach: 2013 at Florida State and 2011 and 2012 at Alabama as secondary coach. Georgia also added three other coaches to their defensive staff: Tracy Rocker, Mike Ekeler, and Kevin Sherrer.

== Personnel ==
=== Coaching staff ===
Name	Position	Seasons at Georgia	Alma mater
Mark Richt	Head coach	14	Miami (FL) (1982)
Mike Bobo	Offensive coordinator, Quarterbacks	14	Georgia (1997)
Bryan McClendon	Running backs/Recruiting Coordinator	6	Georgia (2005)
John Lilly	Tight ends/Offensive Special Teams Coordinator	7	Guilford College (1990)
Tony Ball	Wide receivers	6	Chattanooga (1983)
Will Friend	Offensive line/Running Game Coordinator	4	Alabama (1998)
Jeremy Pruitt	Defensive coordinator/Secondary	1	West Alabama (1999)
Tracy Rocker	Defensive line/Will Linebackers	1	Auburn (1988)
Mike Ekeler	Inside Linebackers/Defensive Special Teams Coordinator	1	Kansas State (1994)
Kevin Sherrer	Sam Linebackers	1	Alabama (1996)
Buddy Collins	Special Teams Coordinator/Quality Control	2	MidAmerica Nazarene (2010)
Dan Inman	Offensive Graduate Assistant	2	Georgia (2007)
Doug Saylor	Offensive Graduate Assistant	2	Georgia (2011)
Kelin Johnson	Defensive Graduate Assistant	0	Georgia (2007)

== Schedule ==
Date	Time	Opponent	Rank	Site	TV	Result	Attendance
August 30	5:30 p.m.	No. 16 Clemson*	No. 12	Sanford Stadium; Athens, GA (rivalry)	ESPN	W 45–21	92,746
September 13	3:30 p.m.	at No. 24 South Carolina	No. 6	Williams-Brice Stadium; Columbia, SC (rivalry)	CBS	L 35–38	84,232
September 20	12:00 p.m.	Troy*	No. 13	Sanford Stadium; Athens, GA	SECN	W 66–0	92,746
September 27	12:00 p.m.	Tennessee	No. 12	Sanford Stadium; Athens, GA (rivalry / SEC Nation)	ESPN	W 35–32	92,746
October 4	4:00 p.m.	Vanderbilt^{†}	No. 13	Sanford Stadium; Athens, GA (rivalry)	SECN	W 44–17	92,746
October 11	12:00 p.m.	at No. 23 Missouri	No. 13	Faurot Field; Columbia, MO	CBS	W 34–0	71,168
October 18	4:00 p.m.	at Arkansas	No. 10	War Memorial Stadium; Little Rock, AR	SECN	W 45–32	54,959
November 1	3:30 p.m.	vs. Florida	No. 11	EverBank Field; Jacksonville, FL (rivalry)	CBS	L 20–38	83,004
November 8	12:00 p.m.	at Kentucky	No. 20	Commonwealth Stadium; Lexington, KY	ESPN	W 63–31	60,152
November 15	7:15 p.m.	No. 9 Auburn	No. 15	Sanford Stadium; Athens, GA (Deep South's Oldest Rivalry)	ESPN	W 34–7	92,746
November 22	12:00 p.m.	Charleston Southern*	No. 10	Sanford Stadium; Athens, GA	SECN	W 55–9	92,746
November 29	12:00 p.m.	No. 16 Georgia Tech*	No. 9	Sanford Stadium; Athens, GA (Clean, Old-Fashioned Hate)	SECN	L 24–30 ^{OT}	92,746
December 30	6:30 p.m.	vs. No. 21 Louisville*	No. 13	Bank of America Stadium; Charlotte, NC (Belk Bowl)	ESPN	W 37–14	45,671
*Non-conference game; ^{†}Homecoming; Rankings from AP Poll and CFP Rankings after October 28 released prior to game; All times are in Eastern time

Schedule source:

== Rankings ==
Ranking movements Legend: ██ Increase in ranking ██ Decrease in ranking ( ) = First-place votes
	Week																
Poll	Pre	1	2	3	4	5	6	7	8	9	10	11	12	13	14	15	Final
AP	12	6 (2)	6 (1)	13	12	13	13	10	9	9	17	16	9	8	15	13	9
Coaches	12	8 (1)	6 (1)	14	13	12	10	10	9	8	17	14	10	9	15	13	9
CFP	Not released									11	20	15	10	9	14	13	Not released
