= 2014 Vanderbilt Commodores football team =

American college football season

2014 Vanderbilt Commodores football
- Conference: Southeastern Conference
- Eastern Division
- Record: 3–9 (0–8 SEC)
- Head coach: Derek Mason (1st season)
- Offensive coordinator: Karl Dorrell (1st season)
- Offensive scheme: Pro-style
- Defensive coordinator: Dave Kotulski (1st season)
- Base defense: 3–4
- Home stadium: Vanderbilt Stadium

2014 Southeastern Conference football standings
	Conf.			Overall
Team	W		L	W		L
Eastern Division
No. 14 Missouri x	7	–	1	11	–	3
No. 9 Georgia	6	–	2	10	–	3
Florida	4	–	4	7	–	5
Tennessee	3	–	5	7	–	6
South Carolina	3	–	5	7	–	6
Kentucky	2	–	6	5	–	7
Vanderbilt	0	–	8	3	–	9
Western Division
No. 4 Alabama x$^	7	–	1	12	–	2
No. 11 Mississippi State	6	–	2	10	–	3
No. 17 Ole Miss *	5	–	3	9	–	4
No. 22 Auburn	4	–	4	8	–	5
LSU *	4	–	4	8	–	5
Texas A&M	3	–	5	8	–	5
Arkansas	2	–	6	7	–	6
Championship: Alabama 42, Missouri 13
^ – College Football Playoff participant; $ – Conference champion; x – Division champion/co-champions; * LSU and Ole Miss vacated all wins (except for Ole Miss' win over Presbyterian) due to NCAA violations.; Rankings from AP Poll

The 2014 Vanderbilt Commodores football team represented Vanderbilt University during the 2014 NCAA Division I FBS football season. The Commodores played their eight home games at Vanderbilt Stadium at Dudley Field in Nashville, Tennessee, which has been Vanderbilt football's home stadium since 1922. Derek Mason took over the helm as Vanderbilt's new head coach. They were members of the Eastern Division of the Southeastern Conference (SEC). They finished the season 3–9, 0–8 in SEC play to finish in last place in the Eastern Division.

== Coaching staff ==
Name	Position	Year
Derek Mason	Head Coach	1st
Karl Dorrell	Offensive coordinator/ quarterbacks coach	1st
Dave Kotulski	Defensive coordinator / inside linebackers coach	1st
Charles Bankins	Running Backs Coach/special teams coordinator	4th
Gerry Gdowski	Wide receivers coach	1st
Keven Lightner	Offensive line coach	1st
Frank Maile	Defensive line coach	1st
Kenwick Thompson	Outside Linebackers	1st
Ryan Anderson	Defensive Graduate Assistant	2nd
Tom Bossung	Head Athletic Trainer	16th
Cedric Calhoun	Assistant Sports Performance	1st
Kevin Colon	Associate Director of student athletics	4th
Jason Grooms	Director of football operations	1st
Bill Hughan	Football Strength and Conditioning Director	1st
Kevin Threlkel	Offensive Administrative Assistant	4th
Matt Ruland	Assistant recruiting coordinator	1st
Luke Wyatt	Head Equipment Manager	32nd
Tyler Barnes	Defensive Graduate Assistant	2nd
Rod Chance	Quality Control Offense	1st
A.J. Haase	Offensive Graduate Assistant	1st
Chandler Henley	Offensive Graduate Assistant	1st
Charles Walker	Defensive Quality Control	1st

== Recruiting ==
College recruiting information (2014)
Name	Hometown	School	Height	Weight	40^{‡}	Commit date
Dallas Rivers; RB	DeKalb County, Georgia	Tucker	6 ft 0 in (1.83 m)	210 lb (95 kg)	–	Mar 23, 2013
Dallas Rivers; RB	Recruit ratings: Scout: Rivals: 247Sports: ESPN:					
Wade Freebeck; QB	Fort Lauderdale, Florida	St. Thomas Aquinas HS	6 ft 5 in (1.96 m)	210 lb (95 kg)	–	Feb 5, 2014
Wade Freebeck; QB	Recruit ratings: Scout: Rivals: 247Sports: ESPN:					
Shawn Stankavage; QB	Raleigh, North Carolina	Cardinal Gibbons	6 ft 2 in (1.88 m)	182 lb (83 kg)	–	Feb 2, 2014
Shawn Stankavage; QB	Recruit ratings: Scout: Rivals: 247Sports: ESPN:					
Bryce Lewis; DB	Lilburn, Georgia	Parkview High School	6 ft 0 in (1.83 m)	170 lb (77 kg)	–	Mar 23, 2013
Bryce Lewis; DB	Recruit ratings: Scout: Rivals: 247Sports: ESPN:					
Bruno Reagan; OL	Clarksville, Tennessee	Clarksville High School	6 ft 4 in (1.93 m)	302 lb (137 kg)	–	Feb 2, 2014
Bruno Reagan; OL	Recruit ratings: Scout: Rivals: 247Sports: ESPN:					
Khari Blasingame; DB	New Market, Alabama	Buckhorn High School	6 ft 1 in (1.85 m)	200 lb (91 kg)	–	Jan 25, 2014
Khari Blasingame; DB	Recruit ratings: Scout: Rivals: 247Sports: ESPN:					
Bailey Granier; OL	Galliano, Louisiana	South LaFourche High school	6 ft 6 in (1.98 m)	340 lb (150 kg)	–	Jan 28, 2014
Bailey Granier; OL	Recruit ratings: Scout: Rivals: 247Sports: ESPN:					
Caleb Scott; WR	Suwanee, Georgia	North Gwinnett High School	6 ft 2 in (1.88 m)	185 lb (84 kg)	–	Feb 3, 2014
Caleb Scott; WR	Recruit ratings: Scout: Rivals: 247Sports: ESPN:					
Tre Tarpley; DB	Pittsburgh, Pennsylvania	Central Catholic High School	6 ft 0 in (1.83 m)	195 lb (88 kg)	–	Feb 2, 2014
Tre Tarpley; DB	Recruit ratings: Scout: Rivals: 247Sports: ESPN:					
Sekou Clark; DL	Denton, Texas	Ryan High School	6 ft 3 in (1.91 m)	245 lb (111 kg)	–	Feb 5, 2014
Sekou Clark; DL	Recruit ratings: Scout: Rivals: 247Sports: ESPN:					
Rashad Canty; WR	Atlanta, Georgia	Riverdale High School	6 ft 3 in (1.91 m)	202 lb (92 kg)	5.35	Jan 21, 2014
Rashad Canty; WR	Recruit ratings: Scout: Rivals: 247Sports: ESPN:					
Emmanuel Smith; DB	Murfreesboro, Tennessee	Okland High School	6 ft 2 in (1.88 m)	205 lb (93 kg)	–	Mar 23, 2013
Emmanuel Smith; DB	Recruit ratings: Scout: Rivals: 247Sports: ESPN:					
Cole Hardin; OL	Florence, Alabama	Florence High School	6 ft 4 in (1.93 m)	295 lb (134 kg)	–	Jun 15, 2013
Cole Hardin; OL	Recruit ratings: Scout: Rivals: 247Sports: ESPN:					
Ronald Monroe; ATH	Houston, Texas	Fort Bend Bush High School	6 ft 2 in (1.88 m)	185 lb (84 kg)	–	Feb 4, 2014
Ronald Monroe; ATH	Recruit ratings: Scout: Rivals: 247Sports: ESPN:					
Tre Herndon; DB	Chattanooga, Tennessee	East Hamilton High School	6 ft 1 in (1.85 m)	180 lb (82 kg)	–	Jul 12, 2014
Tre Herndon; DB	Recruit ratings: Scout: Rivals: 247Sports: ESPN:					
Trent Sherfield; WR	Danville, Illinois	Danville High School	6 ft 1 in (1.85 m)	192 lb (87 kg)	–	Jul 12, 2013
Trent Sherfield; WR	Recruit ratings: Scout: Rivals: 247Sports: ESPN:					
Hawkins Mann; LB	Burbank, California	Burroughs High School	6 ft 3 in (1.91 m)	230 lb (100 kg)	–	Feb 2, 2014
Hawkins Mann; LB	Recruit ratings: Scout: Rivals: 247Sports: ESPN:					
Charles Wright; LB	Irvine, California	Beckman High School	6 ft 3 in (1.91 m)	225 lb (102 kg)	–	Feb 2, 2014
Charles Wright; LB	Recruit ratings: Scout: Rivals: 247Sports: ESPN:					
Riley Tindol; DL	Autauga County, Alabama	Autauga Academy	6 ft 5 in (1.96 m)	270 lb (120 kg)	–	Feb 4, 2014
Riley Tindol; DL	Recruit ratings: Scout: Rivals: 247Sports: ESPN:					
Davis Winkie; LS	Cumming, Georgia	South Forsyth High School	6 ft 6 in (1.98 m)	265 lb (120 kg)	–	Feb 2, 2014
Davis Winkie; LS	Recruit ratings: Scout: Rivals: 247Sports: ESPN:					
Ladarius Wiley; DB	Los Angeles, California	Cathedral High School	6 ft 1 in (1.85 m)	195 lb (88 kg)	–	Feb 5, 2014
Ladarius Wiley; DB	Recruit ratings: Scout: Rivals: 247Sports: ESPN:					
Nifae Lealao; DT	Sacramento, California	Capital Christian High School	6 ft 5 in (1.96 m)	310 lb (140 kg)	–	Feb 5, 2014
Nifae Lealao; DT	Recruit ratings: Scout: Rivals: 247Sports: ESPN:					
Overall recruit ranking: Scout: 50 Rivals: 50 247Sports: 50 ESPN: 48
‡ Refers to 40-yard dash; Note: In many cases, Scout, Rivals, 247Sports, On3, and ESPN may conflict in their listings of height, weight and 40 time.; In these cases, the average was taken. ESPN grades are on a 100-point scale.; Sources: "2014 Team Ranking". Rivals.com.

== Schedule ==
In 2014 Vanderbilt played eight home games; the Ole Miss game was played at LP Field, but it was considered a Vandy home game. Their first four games were at home. Vanderbilt played at Kentucky (Lexington, Kentucky), Georgia (Athens, Georgia), Missouri (Columbia, Missouri), and at Mississippi State (Starkville, Mississippi). Also Vandy played four non-conference teams at home against Temple, UMass, Charleston Southern, and Old Dominion.

Date	Time	Opponent	Site	TV	Result	Attendance
August 28	9:50 p.m.	Temple*	Vanderbilt Stadium; Nashville, TN	SECN	L 7–37	31,731
September 6	3:30 p.m.	No. 15 Ole Miss	LP Field; Nashville, TN (rivalry / SEC Nation)	ESPN	L 3–41	43,260
September 13	11:00 a.m.	UMass*	Vanderbilt Stadium; Nashville, TN	SECRN	W 34–31	33,386
September 20	6:30 p.m.	No. 14 South Carolina	Vanderbilt Stadium; Nashville, TN	SECN	L 34–48	34,441
September 27	11:00 a.m.	at Kentucky	Commonwealth Stadium; Lexington, KY (rivalry)	SECN	L 7–17	56,940
October 4	3:00 p.m.	at No. 13 Georgia	Sanford Stadium; Athens, GA (rivalry)	SECN	L 17–44	92,746
October 11	6:30 p.m.	No. 24 (FCS) Charleston Southern*^{†}	Vanderbilt Stadium; Nashville, TN	SECRN	W 21–20	26,738
October 25	3:00 p.m.	at Missouri	Faurot Field; Columbia, MO	SECN	L 14–24	65,264
November 1	6:00 p.m.	Old Dominion*	Vanderbilt Stadium; Nashville, TN	ESPNU	W 42–28	28,966
November 8	6:30 p.m.	Florida	Vanderbilt Stadium; Nashville, TN	SECN	L 10–34	35,191
November 22	6:30 p.m.	at No. 4 Mississippi State	Davis Wade Stadium; Starkville, MS	SECN	L 0–51	60,493
November 29	3:00 p.m.	Tennessee	Vanderbilt Stadium; Nashville, TN (rivalry)	SECN	L 17–24	40,350
*Non-conference game; ^{†}Homecoming; Rankings from AP Poll released prior to the game; All times are in Central time

== Game summaries ==
=== Temple ===
The Derek Mason era got off to a bad start as his mistake-prone Commodores were outscored 37-7 in a loss to visiting Temple at home. It was the worst defeat in a home opener in Vanderbilt program history, and the worst opening game loss since 1998 a 42-0 loss to Mississippi. The Commodores had seven turnovers, leading to 27 points for Temple.

Team	1	2	3	4	Total
• Temple	7	14	13	3	37
Vanderbilt	0	7	0	0	7

- Location: Nashville, Tennessee
- Game start: 9:52 p.m. (The game was delayed from 8:15 p.m. by thunderstorms)
- Elapsed time: 3:22
- Game attendance: 31,731
- Game weather: 78 degrees, mostly cloudy
- TV announcers (SEC Network): Dave Neal, Andre Ware, Laura Rutledge

=== Ole Miss ===
With a bad loss to Ole Miss Vandy had the worst start since 1998. In 1998 they lost to Ole Miss 42-0 and Alabama 32-7 to start the season. Also in 1998 Vanderbilt started with a six straight losses and ended the 1997 season with five straight losses to complete an eleven-game losing streak.

Team	1	2	3	4	Total
• Ole Miss	10	10	21	0	41
Vanderbilt	0	0	0	3	3

- Location: Nashville, Tennessee (LP Field)
- Game start: 3:30 p.m.
- Elapsed time: 3:12
- Game attendance: 43,260
- Game weather: 82 degrees, mostly cloudy
- TV announcers (ESPN): Joe Tessitore, Brock Huard, Shannon Spake

=== UMass ===
Team	1	2	3	4	Total
UMass	14	10	7	0	31
• Vanderbilt	0	20	0	14	34

- Location: Nashville, Tennessee
- Game start: 11:05 a.m.
- Elapsed time: 3:48
- Game attendance: 33,386
- Game weather: 62 degrees, cloudy
- TV announcers (ESPN3/FSN): Bob Rathbun, Tim Couch

=== South Carolina ===
Team	1	2	3	4	Total
• South Carolina	0	17	10	21	48
Vanderbilt	14	0	10	10	34

- Location: Nashville, Tennessee
- Game start: 6:39 p.m.
- Elapsed time: 3:36
- Game attendance: 34,441
- Game weather: 84 degrees, partly cloudy
- TV announcers (SEC Network): Brent Musburger, Jesse Palmer, Maria Taylor

=== Kentucky ===
Team	1	2	3	4	Total
Vanderbilt	0	7	0	0	7
• Kentucky	7	10	0	0	17

- Location: Lexington, Kentucky
- Game start: 12:01 pm
- Elapsed time: 2:56
- Game attendance: 56,940
- Game weather: 76 degrees, mostly sunny
- TV announcers (SEC Network): Dave Neal, Andre Ware, Laura Rutledge

=== Georgia ===
Team	1	2	3	4	Total
Vanderbilt	0	7	3	7	17
• Georgia	21	6	7	10	44

- Location: Athens, Georgia
- Game start: 4:01 pm
- Elapsed time: 3:14
- Game attendance: 92,746
- Game weather: 65 degrees, sunny and breezy (10 mph winds)
- TV announcers (SEC Network): Dave Neal, Andre Ware, Laura Rutledge

=== Charleston Southern ===
Team	1	2	3	4	Total
Charleston Southern	0	10	7	3	20
• Vanderbilt	3	18	0	0	21

- Location: Nashville, Tennessee
- Game start: 6:35 pm
- Elapsed time: 3:23
- Game attendance: 26,738
- Game weather: 60 degrees, cloudy
- TV announcers (ESPN3/FSN): Bob Rathbun, Tim Couch, Olivia Harlan

=== Missouri ===
Team	1	2	3	4	Total
Vanderbilt	0	7	0	7	14
• Missouri	3	7	7	7	24

- Location: Columbia, Missouri
- Game start: 3:07 p.m.
- Elapsed time: 3:13
- Game attendance: 65,264
- Game weather: 76 degrees, sunny, 3 mph
- Referee: Marc Curles
- TV announcers (SEC Network): Tom Hart, Matt Stinchcomb, Kayce Smith (sidelines)

=== Old Dominion ===
Team	1	2	3	4	Total
Old Dominion	7	7	7	7	28
• Vanderbilt	7	21	0	14	42

- Location: Nashville, Tennessee
- Game start: 6:02 p.m.
- Elapsed time: 3:16
- Game attendance: 28,966
- Game weather: 47 degrees, clear
- TV announcers (ESPNU): Clay Matvick, Anthony Becht

=== Florida ===
Team	1	2	3	4	Total
• Florida	7	10	0	17	34
Vanderbilt	7	0	0	3	10

- Location: Nashville, Tennessee
- Game start: 6:39 p.m.
- Elapsed time: 3:25
- Game attendance: 35,191
- Game weather: 51 degrees, cloudy
- TV announcers (SEC Network): Dave Neal, Andre Ware, Laura Rutledge

=== Mississippi State ===
Team	1	2	3	4	Total
Vanderbilt	0	0	0	0	0
• Mississippi State	13	24	7	7	51

- Location: Starkville, Mississippi
- Game start: 6:39 p.m.
- Elapsed time: 3:19
- Game attendance: 60,493
- Game weather: 60 degrees, partly cloudy
- TV announcers (SEC Network): Tom Hart, Matt Stinchcomb, Heather Mitts

=== Tennessee ===
Team	1	2	3	4	Total
• Tennessee	10	7	7	0	24
Vanderbilt	0	10	7	0	17

- Location: Nashville, Tennessee
- Game start: 3:01 p.m.
- Elapsed time: 3:30
- Game attendance: 40,350
- Game weather: 57 degrees, cloudy with 16 MPH winds
- TV announcers (SEC Network): Tom Hart, Matt Stinchcomb, Heather Mitts
