= 2012 Kentucky Wildcats football team =

American college football season

2012 Kentucky Wildcats football
- Conference: Southeastern Conference
- Eastern Division
- Record: 2–10 (0–8 SEC)
- Head coach: Joker Phillips (3rd season)
- Offensive coordinator: Randy Sanders (3rd season)
- Offensive scheme: Pro-style
- Defensive coordinator: Rick Minter (2nd season)
- Base defense: 4–3
- Home stadium: Commonwealth Stadium

2012 Southeastern Conference football standings
	Conf.			Overall
Team	W		L	W		L
Eastern Division
No. T–5 Georgia xy	7	–	1	12	–	2
No. 9 Florida x%	7	–	1	11	–	2
No. 8 South Carolina	6	–	2	11	–	2
No. 23 Vanderbilt	5	–	3	9	–	4
Missouri	2	–	6	5	–	7
Tennessee	1	–	7	5	–	7
Kentucky	0	–	8	2	–	10
Western Division
No. 1 Alabama x$#	7	–	1	13	–	1
No. 14 LSU *	6	–	2	10	–	3
No. T–5 Texas A&M	6	–	2	11	–	2
Mississippi State	4	–	4	8	–	5
Ole Miss *	3	–	5	7	–	6
Arkansas	2	–	6	4	–	8
Auburn	0	–	8	3	–	9
Championship: Alabama 32, Georgia 28
# – BCS National Champion; $ – BCS representative as conference champion; % – BCS at-large representative; x – Division champion/co-champions; y – Championship game participant; * Ole Miss and LSU vacated all wins due to NCAA violations.; Rankings from AP Poll

The 2012 Kentucky Wildcats football team represented the University of Kentucky in the 2012 NCAA Division I FBS football season. The team, led by third-year head coach Joker Phillips, played their home games at Commonwealth Stadium in Lexington, Kentucky, US, and compete in the Eastern Division of the Southeastern Conference (SEC). On November 4, 2012, Kentucky Athletic director Mitch Barnhart announced that the university would not retain Phillips as head coach after the season.

== 2012 signing class ==
24 recruits signed letters of intent to Kentucky for the 2012 season.

College recruiting information (2012)
Name	Hometown	School	Height	Weight	40^{‡}	Commit date
Daron Blaylock; LB	Marietta, Georgia	Walton	6 ft 0 in (1.83 m)	218 lb (99 kg)	4.5	Jun 5, 2011
Daron Blaylock; LB	Recruit ratings: Scout: Rivals: (76)					
Shawn Blaylock; DB	Stone Mountain, Georgia	Stephenson	5 ft 11 in (1.80 m)	175 lb (79 kg)	4.5	Jun 2, 2011
Shawn Blaylock; DB	Recruit ratings: Scout: Rivals: (45)					
Zack Blaylock; DB	Marietta, Georgia	Walton	5 ft 11 in (1.80 m)	175 lb (79 kg)	N/A	Jun 5, 2011
Zack Blaylock; DB	Recruit ratings: Scout: Rivals: (74)					
Thomas Chapman; DT	Louisville, Kentucky	DuPont Manual	6 ft 4 in (1.93 m)	290 lb (130 kg)	N/A	Feb 26, 2011
Thomas Chapman; DT	Recruit ratings: Scout: Rivals: (77)					
Landon Foster; K	Franklin, Tennessee	Independence	6 ft 4 in (1.93 m)	290 lb (130 kg)	N/A	Aug 2, 2011
Landon Foster; K	Recruit ratings: Scout: Rivals: (74)					
Patrick Graffree; DT	Elizabethtown, Kentucky	Central Hardin	6 ft 4 in (1.93 m)	250 lb (110 kg)	N/A	Jun 13, 2011
Patrick Graffree; DT	Recruit ratings: Scout: Rivals: (75)					
J.D. Harmon; WR	Paducah, Kentucky	Paducah Tilghman	6 ft 2 in (1.88 m)	195 lb (88 kg)	N/A	Jan 22, 2011
J.D. Harmon; WR	Recruit ratings: Scout: Rivals: (45)					
Josh Harris; LB	Maysville, Kentucky	Mason County	6 ft 1 in (1.85 m)	200 lb (91 kg)	N/A	Feb 26, 2011
Josh Harris; LB	Recruit ratings: Scout: Rivals: (77)					
Khalid Henderson; LB	Austell, Georgia	Pebblebrook	6 ft 1 in (1.85 m)	205 lb (93 kg)	N/A	Jan 30, 2012
Khalid Henderson; LB	Recruit ratings: Scout: Rivals: (80)					
T.J. Jones; OT	Myrtle Beach, South Carolina	Myrtle Beach	6 ft 5 in (1.96 m)	280 lb (130 kg)	N/A	Aug 2, 2011
T.J. Jones; OT	Recruit ratings: Scout: Rivals: (73)					
A.J. Legree; DB	Fort White, Florida	Ft White	6 ft 0 in (1.83 m)	180 lb (82 kg)	N/A	Dec 20, 2011
A.J. Legree; DB	Recruit ratings: Scout: Rivals: (75)					
Dy'Shawn Mobley; RB	Powell, Tennessee	Powell	6 ft 1 in (1.85 m)	205 lb (93 kg)	4.55	Nov 21, 2011
Dy'Shawn Mobley; RB	Recruit ratings: Scout: Rivals: (74)					
Zach Myers; OG	Miamisburg, Ohio	Miamisburg	6 ft 4 in (1.93 m)	270 lb (120 kg)	N/A	Jun 30, 2011
Zach Myers; OG	Recruit ratings: Scout: Rivals: (75)					
Langston Newton; DE	Carmel, Indiana	Carmel	6 ft 4 in (1.93 m)	250 lb (110 kg)	N/A	Aug 4, 2011
Langston Newton; DE	Recruit ratings: Scout: Rivals: (78)					
Cody Quinn; DB	Middletown, Ohio	Middletown	5 ft 10 in (1.78 m)	180 lb (82 kg)	N/A	Jan 14, 2011
Cody Quinn; DB	Recruit ratings: Scout: Rivals: (75)					
Jonathan Reed; DB	Indianapolis, Indiana	Pike	5 ft 11 in (1.80 m)	175 lb (79 kg)	4.4	Jun 8, 2011
Jonathan Reed; DB	Recruit ratings: Scout: Rivals: (77)					
Daniel Ross; DE	Louisville, Kentucky	Jeffersontown	6 ft 5 in (1.96 m)	255 lb (116 kg)	N/A	Aug 1, 2011
Daniel Ross; DE	Recruit ratings: Scout: Rivals: (73)					
DeMarcus Sweat; WR	Stone Mountain, Georgia	Stephenson	6 ft 1 in (1.85 m)	185 lb (84 kg)	4.4	May 29, 2011
DeMarcus Sweat; WR	Recruit ratings: Scout: Rivals: (78)					
Jordan Swindle; OT	Jacksonville, Florida	Creekside	6 ft 8 in (2.03 m)	303 lb (137 kg)	N/A	Aug 16, 2011
Jordan Swindle; OT	Recruit ratings: Scout: Rivals: (77)					
Justin Taylor; RB	Atlanta, Georgia	Washington	5 ft 10 in (1.78 m)	210 lb (95 kg)	4.5	Feb 2, 2012
Justin Taylor; RB	Recruit ratings: Scout: Rivals: (78)					
Kadeem Thomas; LB	Tallahassee, Florida	Godby	6 ft 0 in (1.83 m)	235 lb (107 kg)	4.7	Sep 25, 2011
Kadeem Thomas; LB	Recruit ratings: Scout: Rivals: (76)					
Fred Tiller; DB	Homerville, Georgia	Clinch County	6 ft 1 in (1.85 m)	178 lb (81 kg)	4.5	Sep 20, 2011
Fred Tiller; DB	Recruit ratings: Scout: Rivals: (77)					
Jon Toth; OT	Indianapolis, Indiana	Brebeuf Jesuit Prep	6 ft 5 in (1.96 m)	290 lb (130 kg)	N/A	Jul 6, 2011
Jon Toth; OT	Recruit ratings: Scout: Rivals: (73)					
Patrick Towles; QB	Ft. Thomas, Kentucky	Highlands	6 ft 5 in (1.96 m)	232 lb (105 kg)	4.7	Apr 1, 2011
Patrick Towles; QB	Recruit ratings: Scout: Rivals: (79)					
Jordan Watson; OG	Fayetteville, Georgia	Whitewater	6 ft 4 in (1.93 m)	285 lb (129 kg)	N/A	Jul 5, 2011
Jordan Watson; OG	Recruit ratings: Scout: Rivals: (75)					
Jalen Whitlow; ATH	Prattville, Alabama	Prattville	6 ft 3 in (1.91 m)	200 lb (91 kg)	N/A	Jan 31, 2012
Jalen Whitlow; ATH	Recruit ratings: Scout: Rivals: (76)					
Overall recruit ranking:
Note: In many cases, Scout, Rivals, 247Sports, On3, and ESPN may conflict in their listings of height and weight.; In these cases, the average was taken. ESPN grades are on a 100-point scale.; Sources: "Kentucky 2012 Football Commitments". Rivals.; "2012 Kentucky Football Commits". Scout.; "ESPN". ESPN.; "Scout.com Team Recruiting Rankings". Scout.; "2012 Team Ranking". Rivals.com.

== Schedule ==
Date	Time	Opponent	Site	TV	Result	Attendance
September 2	3:30 pm	at No. 25 Louisville*	Papa John's Cardinal Stadium; Louisville, KY (Governor's Cup)	ESPN	L 14–32	55,386
September 8	7:30 pm	Kent State*	Commonwealth Stadium; Lexington, KY	CSS	W 47–14	48,346
September 15	7:00 pm	Western Kentucky*	Commonwealth Stadium; Lexington, KY	ESPNU	L 31–32 ^{OT}	53,980
September 22	12:21 pm	at No. 14 Florida	Ben Hill Griffin Stadium; Gainesville, FL (rivalry)	SECN	L 0–38	87,102
September 29	7:00 pm	No. 6 South Carolina	Commonwealth Stadium; Lexington, KY	ESPN2	L 17–38	49,810
October 6	12:21 pm	No. 20 Mississippi State	Commonwealth Stadium; Lexington, KY	SECN	L 14–27	49,498
October 13	7:00 pm	at Arkansas	Donald W. Reynolds Razorback Stadium; Fayetteville, AR	SECRN	L 7–49	67,153
October 20	7:00 pm	No. 13 Georgia^{†}	Commonwealth Stadium; Lexington, KY	SECRN	L 24–29	54,553
October 27	12:00 pm	at Missouri	Faurot Field; Columbia, MO	ESPNU	L 10–33	67,853
November 3	12:00 pm	Vanderbilt	Commonwealth Stadium; Lexington, KY (rivalry)	ESPNU	L 0–40	44,902
November 17	7:30 pm	Samford*	Commonwealth Stadium; Lexington, KY	CSS	W 34–3	46,749
November 24	12:21 pm	at Tennessee	Neyland Stadium; Knoxville, TN (Battle for the Barrel)	SECN	L 17–37	81,841
*Non-conference game; ^{†}Homecoming; Rankings from AP Poll released prior to the game; All times are in Eastern time

Schedule source:

== Personnel ==
=== Roster ===
2012 Kentucky Wildcats football team roster
Players
Coaches
Offense

Pos.	#	Name	Class
RB	4	Raymond Sanders	Jr
WR	6	A.J. Legree	Fr
WR	9	Demarco Robinson	So
QB	10	Jeff Witthuhn	Fr
QB	11	Max Smith	So
QB	12	Morgan Newton	Sr
HOL	13	Jared Leet	Fr
QB	13	Jalen Whitlow	Fr
QB	14	Patrick Towles	Fr
WR	16	La'Rod King	Sr
QB	17	Jacob Russell	Jr
WR	19	EJ Fields	Sr
RB	21	Josh Clemons	So
WR	23	Daryl Collins	Fr
RB	25	Jonathan George	So
RB	26	CoShik Williams	Sr
WR	27	Aaron Boyd	Sr
WR	29	Austin Sheehan	Fr
RB	30	Justin Taylor	Fr
RB	33	Dyshawn Mobley	Fr
WR	34	Latrell Wilson	Fr
WR	35	William Tanner	So
FB	37	Cody Jones	Jr
FB	39	DJ Warren	So
RB	41	Chad Merida	So
OT	51	T.J. Jones	Fr
G	55	Jordan Watson	Fr
G	57	Zach Myers	Fr
G	58	Shaquille Love	Fr
OT	62	Tyler Davenport	So
G	64	Max Godby	So
OT	65	Damon Sprouse	Fr
G	67	Larry Warford	Sr
C	69	Matt Smith	Sr
OT	70	Jordan Swindle	Fr
G	71	John Gruenschlaeger	Fr
OT	72	Jon Toth	Fr
G	73	Stephen Duff	So
OT	74	Trevino Woods	Sr
G	75	Zach West	Fr
G	76	Teven Eatmon-Nared	So
OT	77	Darrian Miller	So
G	79	Kevin Mitchell	Jr
TE	80	Ronnie Shields	So
WR	81	Rashad Cunningham	Fr
TE	82	Anthony Kendrick	Jr
WR	83	DeMarcus Sweat	Fr
TE	84	Gabe Correll	Sr
WR	85	Gene McCaskill	Sr
TE	86	Jordan Aumiller	Jr
WR	87	Bookie Cobbins	Fr
WR, DB	88	J.D. Harmon	Fr
TE	89	Tyler Robinson	Jr

Defense

Pos.	#	Name	Class
CB	1	Martavius Neloms	Sr
LB	2	Alvin Dupree	So
CB	3	Fred Tiller	Fr
S	5	Ashely Lowery	So
LB	7	Daron Blaylock	Fr
LB	8	Josh Forrest	Fr
LB	10	Tyler Brause	So
DB	15	Marcus Caffey (I)	Fr
CB	16	Cody Quinn	Fr
S	17	Zack Blaylock	Fr
S	18	Glenn Faulkner	So
LB	20	Josh Harris	Fr
LB	22	Khalid Henderson	Fr
CB	24	Jonathan Reed	Fr
CB	25	Cantrell McKinely	So
S	26	Tre Dunn	Jr
CB	27	Shawn Blaylock (injured)	Fr
CB	28	Eric Dixon	So
CB	29	Cody Lewis	Fr
S	30	Michael Arnold	Fr
S	31	Mikie Benton	Sr
LB	32	Miles Simpson	So
S	34	Kory Brown	So
CB	35	Cartier Rice	Sr
CB	36	Jerry Williams	So
CB	37	Christian Hudnell	Jr
CB	38	Eric Simmons	So
LB	40	Avery Williamson	Jr
DE	41	Travaughn Paschal	So
CB	43	Sterling Wright	Fr
LB	44	Maurice Hall	Jr
LB	45	Pancho Thomas	Fr
DE	46	Patrick Ligon	Jr
LB	47	Jabari Johnson	So
LB	49	Demarius Rancifer	Fr
DE	50	Mike Douglas	So
DT	51	Tristian Johnson	Jr
DT	52	Patrick Graffree	Fr
LB	54	Malcolm McDuffen	So
DT	60	Alvin Davis	So
DT	64	Lionel Inanzala	So
DT	78	Zane Williams	Fr
DE	91	Farrington Huguenin	Fr
DT	92	Christian Coleman	So
DE	94	Taylor Wyndham	Sr
DE	95	Langston Newton	Fr
DE	96	Collins Ukwu	Sr
DT	97	Mister Cobble	Jr
DT	98	Thomas Chapman	Fr
DT	99	Donte Rumph	Jr

Special teams

Pos.	#	Name	Class
PK, P	9	Landon Foster	Fr
P	42	Jay Wilmott	Fr
LS	53	Matthew Adolph	Jr
LS	59	Kelly Mason	Fr
LS	81	Kyle Buddle	So
PK, P	88	Joe Mansour	Jr
PK	93	Craig McIntosh	Sr

Head coach

- Joker Phillips

Coordinators/assistant coaches

- Mike Cassity
  Defensive backs
- Rick Minter
  Defensive coordinator
- Greg Nord
  Special teams coordinator/tight ends
- Steve Pardue
  Running backs
- Randy Sanders
  Offensive coordinator/quarterbacks
- Chuck Smith
  Linebackers
- Mike Summers
  Offensive line
- David Turner
  Defensive linemen
- Pat Washington
  Wide receivers

Legend

- (C) Team captain
- (S) Suspended
- (I) Ineligible
- Injured
- Redshirt

Roster
Last update: April 29, 2012

=== Depth chart ===
Defense

FS
31 Benton
28 Dixon

Strongside	Middle	Weakside	SLB
94 Wyndham	40 Williamson	2 Dupree	⋅
2 Dupree	45 Thomas	22 Henderson	⋅

SS
5 Lowery
7 Blaylock

CB
1 Neloms
15 Harmon

DE	NT	DE
96 Ukwu	97 Cobble	99 Rumph
91 Huguenin	51 Johnson	50 Douglas

CB
16 Quinn
35 Rice

Offense

WR
16 King
6 Legree

WR
85 McCaskill
23 Collins

LT	LG	C	RG	RT
77 Miller	75 West	69 Smith	67 Warford	79 Mitchell
70 Swindle	76 Eatmon-Nared	64 Godby	71 Gruenschlaeger	74 Woods

TE
80 Shields
89 T. Robinson

WR
9 Robinson
83 Sweat

QB
13 Whitlow
14 Towles

RB
4 Sanders
25 George

Special teams
PK 93 McIntosh
PK 88 Mansour
P 9 Foster
P 42 Wilmott
KR 9 Robinson
PR 23 Collins
LS 59 Mason
H 12 Newton

=== Starters per game ===
Offense

	QB	RB	WR	WR	WR	TE	OT	OG	C	OG	OT
Louisville	Smith	Williams	King	Collins	Fields	Shields	Miller	West	Smith	Warford	Mitchell
Kent State	Smith	Sanders	King	Collins	Boyd	Shields	Miller	West	Smith	Warford	Mitchell
Western Kentucky	Smith	Williams	King	McCaskill	Boyd	Shields	Miller	West	Smith	Warford	Mitchell
Florida	Newton	George	King	Collins	Boyd	George	Miller	West	Smith	Warford	Mitchell
South Carolina	Smith	Sanders	King	Collins	D. Robinson	Shields	Miller	West	Smith	Warford	Mitchell
Mississippi State	Whitlow	George	King	McCaskill	D. Robinson	Fields	Miller	West	Smith	Warford	Mitchell
Arkansas	Whitlow	George	King	Collins	D. Robinson	Fields	Miller	West	Smith	Warford	Mitchell
Georgia	Whitlow	George	King	Warren	Boyd	T. Robinson	Miller	West	Smith	Warford	Mitchell
Missouri	Whitlow	George	King	Ligon	D. Robinson	T. Robinson	Miller	West	Smith	Warford	Mitchell
Vanderbilt	Whitlow	George	Fields	McCaskill	Boyd	Ligon	Miller	West	Smith	Warford	Mitchell
Samford	Whitlow	George	King	McCaskill	Boyd	Warren	Miller	West	Smith	Warford	Mitchell
Tennessee	Whitlow	Sanders	King	Boyd	McCaskill	T. Robinson	Miller	West	Smith	Warford	Mitchell

Defense

	DE	DT	DT/DE	DE/LB	LB	LB	LB/DB	DB	DB/S	S	S
Louisville	Ukwu	Cobble	Rumph	Dupree	Williamson	Brause	Simpson	Neloms	Rice	Benton	Lowery
Kent State	Ukwu	Cobble	Rumph	Wyndham	Williamson	Dupree	Simpson	Neloms	Rice	Benton	Lowery
Western Kentucky	Ukwu	Cobble	Rumph	Wyndham	Williamson	Dupree	Simpson	Neloms	Rice	Benton	Lowery
Florida	Ukwu	Johnson	Rumph	Wyndham	Williamson	Dupree	Simpson	Neloms	Quinn	Benton	Lowery
South Carolina	Ukwu	Johnson	Rumph	Wyndham	Williamson	Dupree	Simpson	Rice	Quinn	Benton	Neloms
Mississippi State	Ukwu	Johnson	Rumph	Wyndham	Williamson	Dupree	Lowery	Rice	Quinn	Benton	Neloms
Arkansas	Ukwu	Johnson	Rumph	Wyndham	Williamson	Dupree	Simpson	Rice	Quinn	Z. Blaylock	D. Blaylock
Georgia	Ukwu	Johnson	Rumph	Wyndham	Williamson	Dupree	Simpson	Rice	Quinn	Z. Blaylock	Lowery
Missouri	Ukwu	Johnson	Rumph	Wyndham	Williamson	Dupree	Simpson	Rice	Quinn	Z. Blaylock	Lowery
Vanderbilt	Ukwu	Johnson	Cobble	Wyndham	Williamson	Dupree	Simpson	Rice	Harmon	Neloms	Lowery
Samford	Ukwu	Johnson	Cobble	Wyndham	Williamson	Dupree	Simpson	Rice	Harmon	Neloms	Benton
Tennessee	Huguenin	Johnson	Rumph	Wyndham							

=== 2013 recruiting class ===
College recruiting information (2013)
Name	Hometown	School	Height	Weight	40^{‡}	Commit date
Alvonte Bell; DE	Miramar, Florida	Everglades	6 ft 6 in (1.98 m)	230 lb (100 kg)	N/A	Jun 5, 2012
Alvonte Bell; DE	Recruit ratings: Scout: Rivals: (79)					
Javess Blue; WR	Babson Park, Florida	Butler CC	6 ft 1 in (1.85 m)	195 lb (88 kg)	N/A	Jan 13, 2012
Javess Blue; WR	Recruit ratings: Scout: Rivals: (83)					
Ander Bodkin; OT	Marianna, Florida	Marianna	6 ft 5 in (1.96 m)	285 lb (129 kg)	N/A	Oct 2, 2012
Ander Bodkin; OT	Recruit ratings: Scout: Rivals: (73)					
Steven Borden Jr. TE	Waxahachie, Texas	Kilgore College	6 ft 3 in (1.91 m)	250 lb (110 kg)	4.5	Dec 19, 2012
Steven Borden Jr. TE	Recruit ratings: Scout: Rivals: (77)					
Justin Day; OT	Aiken, South Carolina	South Aiken	6 ft 8 in (2.03 m)	290 lb (130 kg)	N/A	Jun 29, 2012
Justin Day; OT	Recruit ratings: Scout: Rivals: (40)					
Darren Dowdell; TE	Atlanta, Georgia	Grady	6 ft 4 in (1.93 m)	225 lb (102 kg)	N/A	Mar 10, 2012
Darren Dowdell; TE	Recruit ratings: Scout: Rivals: (76)					
Jacob Hyde; DT	Manchester, Kentucky	Clay County	6 ft 4 in (1.93 m)	310 lb (140 kg)	N/A	Mar 1, 2012
Jacob Hyde; DT	Recruit ratings: Scout: Rivals: (78)					
Jaleel Hytchye; DB	Cincinnati, Ohio	LaSalle	5 ft 11 in (1.80 m)	170 lb (77 kg)	N/A	Jan 5, 2013
Jaleel Hytchye; DB	Recruit ratings: Scout: Rivals: (81)					
Austin MacGinnis; K	Prattville, Alabama	Prattville	5 ft 11 in (1.80 m)	175 lb (79 kg)	N/A	Jun 23, 2012
Austin MacGinnis; K	Recruit ratings: Scout: Rivals: (75)					
Kyle Meadows; OT	West Chester Township, Butler County, Ohio	Lakota West	6 ft 6 in (1.98 m)	280 lb (130 kg)	N/A	Jan 12, 2013
Kyle Meadows; OT	Recruit ratings: Scout: Rivals: (79)					
Ramsey Meyers; OG	Jacksonville, Florida	Ridgeview	6 ft 3 in (1.91 m)	300 lb (140 kg)	N/A	Jun 23, 2012
Ramsey Meyers; OG	Recruit ratings: Scout: Rivals: (73)					
Blake McClain; DB	Orlando, Florida	Winter Park	5 ft 11 in (1.80 m)	180 lb (82 kg)	N/A	Jun 27, 2012
Blake McClain; DB	Recruit ratings: Scout: Rivals: (75)					
Lovell Peterson; DT	Dayton, Ohio	Wayne	6 ft 3 in (1.91 m)	280 lb (130 kg)	N/A	Jan 11, 2013
Lovell Peterson; DT	Recruit ratings: Scout: Rivals: (76)					
Reese Phillips; QB	Chattanooga, Tennessee	Signal Mountain	6 ft 3 in (1.91 m)	215 lb (98 kg)	N/A	Jun 6, 2012
Reese Phillips; QB	Recruit ratings: Scout: Rivals: (69)					
Khalid Thomas; RB	Tallahassee, Florida	Godby	5 ft 10 in (1.78 m)	175 lb (79 kg)	4.5	Aug 7, 2012
Khalid Thomas; RB	Recruit ratings: Scout: Rivals: (79)					
Za'Darius Smith; DE	Scooba, Mississippi	East Mississippi CC	6 ft 5 in (1.96 m)	258 lb (117 kg)	4.5	Dec 19, 2012
Za'Darius Smith; DE	Recruit ratings: Scout: Rivals: (83)					
Nate Willis; DB	Pahokee, Florida	Arizona Western College	6 ft 0 in (1.83 m)	180 lb (82 kg)	4.4	Jan 16, 2012
Nate Willis; DB	Recruit ratings: Scout: Rivals: (78)					
DeAngelo Yancey; WR	Atlanta, Georgia	Mays	6 ft 2 in (1.88 m)	201 lb (91 kg)	4.5	Jul 31, 2012
DeAngelo Yancey; WR	Recruit ratings: Scout: Rivals: (76)					
Overall recruit ranking:
Note: In many cases, Scout, Rivals, 247Sports, On3, and ESPN may conflict in their listings of height and weight.; In these cases, the average was taken. ESPN grades are on a 100-point scale.; Sources: "Kentucky 2013 Football Commitments". Rivals.; "2013 Kentucky Football Commits". Scout.; "ESPN". ESPN.; "Scout.com Team Recruiting Rankings". Scout.; "2013 Team Ranking". Rivals.com.
