= Jeff Piecoro =

American sportscaster

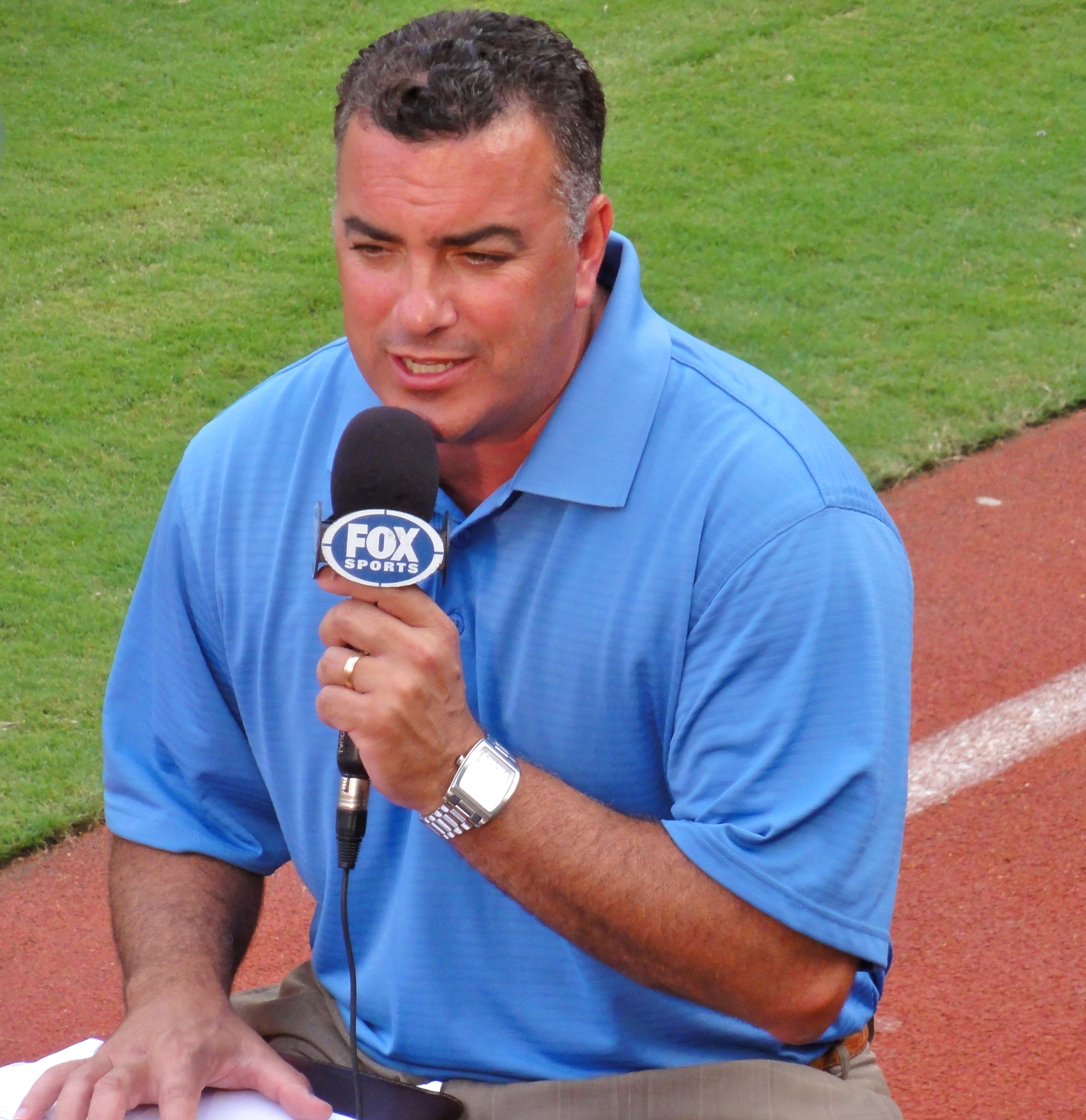
- Piecoro reporting from Sun Life Stadium, 2011.
- Born: Jeff Piecoro
- Sports commentary career
- Teams: Kentucky Wildcats; Cincinnati Reds
- Sports: College football; Baseball

Jeff Piecoro is an American sportscaster. He formerly worked for 24 years with the Cincinnati Reds baseball team as a co-host on Reds Live pregame and post game shows. He and former Big Red Machine member Doug Flynn co-hosted Reds Weekly on Fox Sports Ohio. He also does work as the color commentator on the Big Blue Network during radio broadcasts of University of Kentucky Wildcats football on the UK Sports Network. Since 2015 Piecoro has worked for the SEC Network as play-by-play announcer for men's baseball and women's basketball. In June 2021 Piecoro became a Realtor at The Brokerage Real Estate Advisors in Lexington. He is a member of LBAR and NKAR, and works the Central Kentucky and Northern Kentucky real estate markets. In August 2022 Piecoro was named Sports Director at WTVQ-TV, the ABC affiliate in Lexington, Kentucky. He anchors the 5:00, 6:00 and 11:00 p.m. sports, Monday through Friday.

== Career ==
Piecoro attended and played football at Tates Creek High School in Lexington, Kentucky. He walked-on to the football team at the University of Kentucky in 1980 and was a redshirt his freshman year. He began playing in 1981, first under head coach Fran Curci then under Jerry Claiborne for the remainder of his college career. He earned a scholarship during his senior season and ultimately lettered in football. He graduated from UK in 1985 with a degree in telecommunications.

Piecoro started his broadcasting career in Lexington, Kentucky at ABC affiliate WTVQ, later moving to NBC affiliate WLEX, as weekend sports anchor and sports reporter. He has covered the Kentucky Derby and the Breeders' Cup . He has also worked with the Mid-American Conference, Atlantic 10 and Big East as play by play announcer for football and men's basketball. In August 2001, he was selected to be the color commentator for Kentucky football games on what is now known as the UK Sports Network. Piecoro returned to full-time work in Lexington in 2022 as Sports Director at WTVQ.

Piecoro also worked with the Cincinnati Reds as a co-host for the Reds Live pre-and-post-game shows and as a dugout reporter on team television broadcaster Fox Sports Ohio. In addition to these duties, he hosted the team magazine show Reds Weekly with former Major League Baseball player and television host Doug Flynn.

== Personal life ==
Piecoro resides in Northern Kentucky with his children, Nicholas, Madeleine, Olivia and Ali.

== See also ==
- Cincinnati Reds
- Fox Sports Ohio
