= 2015 Rose Bowl =

College football bowl game

2015 Rose Bowl presented by Northwestern Mutual
- College Football Playoff Semifinal; 101st Rose Bowl Game
Oregon Ducks	Florida State Seminoles
(12–1)	(13–0)
Pac-12	ACC
59	20
Head coach: Mark Helfrich	Head coach: Jimbo Fisher
AP / Coaches / CFP; 3 / 3 / 2	AP / Coaches / CFP; 2 / 2 / 3
	1	2	3	4	Total
Oregon	8	10	27	14	59
Florida State	3	10	7	0	20
- Date: January 1, 2015
- Season: 2014
- Stadium: Rose Bowl
- Location: Pasadena, California
- MVP: Marcus Mariota (QB, Oregon); Tony Washington (LB, Oregon)
- Favorite: Oregon by 8
- Referee: Matt Austin (SEC)
- Attendance: 91,322
- Payout: US$23.9 million per team

United States TV coverage
- Network: ESPN
- Announcers: Chris Fowler, Kirk Herbstreit, Heather Cox, and Tom Rinaldi
- Nielsen ratings: 14.8 (28.2 million viewers)

The 2015 Rose Bowl (officially known as the College Football Playoff Semifinal at the 2015 Rose Bowl Game presented by Northwestern Mutual for sponsorship reasons) was a college football bowl game played on January 1, 2015, at the Rose Bowl in Pasadena, California. The game was the 101st playing of the Rose Bowl Game, and it was the first semifinal of the inaugural College Football Playoff (CFP), part of the slate of bowl games which concluded the 2014 FBS football season. The game featured two of the four teams chosen by the CFP selection committee: the No. 2 Oregon Ducks from the Pac-12 Conference and the No. 3 Florida State Seminoles from the Atlantic Coast Conference (ACC). The winner qualified for the 2015 College Football Playoff National Championship against the winner of the other semifinal, hosted at the Sugar Bowl.

Florida State, the defending national champions, entered the game with a 13–0 record following a two-point victory over Georgia Tech in the ACC championship that extended the Seminoles' win streak to 29 games. Oregon entered 12–1; their lone loss came to Arizona in October, but the Ducks won their next eight games, including a rematch with Arizona in the Pac-12 championship, to secure a spot in the playoff. This was the first meeting between Florida State and Oregon; it was Florida State's first Rose Bowl Game appearance and Oregon's seventh. Both teams were led by Heisman Trophy-winning quarterbacks: FSU's Jameis Winston won in 2013, while Oregon's Marcus Mariota was the 2014 winner.

The game was televised on ESPN and ESPN Deportes, and broadcast on ESPN Radio and XM Satellite Radio, with the kickoff time set for 5 p.m. ET (2 p.m. local time). The Pasadena Tournament of Roses Association organized the game. The Northwestern Mutual financial services organization sponsored the game.

== Background ==
Prior to the game, Knute Rockne, Dick Vermeil, and Ki-Jana Carter were inducted into the Rose Bowl Hall of Fame.

== Teams ==
Traditionally, the Rose Bowl pits the winners of the Big Ten Conference and Pac-12 Conference; however, when the Rose Bowl is a CFP semifinal (every three years beginning with this game), any teams may be selected. Oregon was the Pac-12 champion, while the Big Ten champion Ohio State played in (and won) the Sugar Bowl. The 2015 edition of the Rose Bowl was the first time since the 2006 edition (BCS National Championship Game) that the Big Ten Conference was absent from the game. It was also the first ever time in the 101-year history of the Rose Bowl that the Atlantic Coast Conference made an appearance in the game.

== Game summary ==
The game's officiating crew, representing the Southeastern Conference (SEC), was led by referee Matt Austin. The game was held on January 1, 2015, with a scheduled start time of 2:00 p.m. PST and an actual start time of 2:12 p.m. PST. Oregon entered as 8-point favorites to win. The game was broadcast on ESPN with commentary by Chris Fowler, Kirk Herbstreit, Heather Cox, and Tom Rinaldi; the ESPN Radio broadcast featured commentary by Sean McDonough, Chris Spielman, and Todd McShay.

The pregame coin toss was won by Florida State, who deferred their choice to the second half. Oregon chose to receive the ball to begin the game.

=== First half ===
The game began with a kickoff by Roberto Aguayo, which was returned by Devon Allen to the Oregon 20-yard line. The Ducks opened the game with a three-and-out after netting two yards on their first three plays, and Ian Wheeler punted to the Florida State 41-yard line on fourth down. Florida State similarly faced a third down early in their opening drive but converted it with a 21-yard rush by Karlos Williams to reach the Oregon 29-yard line. A personal foul penalty later in the drive gave the Seminoles another first down, but Florida State lost seven yards after a fumble by Jameis Winston which was recovered by FSU's Bobby Hart. The drive ended two plays later with a 28-yard field goal by Aguayo which gave the Seminoles a 3–0 lead. Oregon began their next drive by gaining two first downs in their first four plays on passes from Marcus Mariota to Evan Baylis and Charles Nelson. After rushing for 1 yard, Mariota passed to Dwayne Stanford to reach the red zone; on the next play, Mariota ran for 2 yards before tossing the ball to Nelson, who gained an additional 14 yards and was tackled at the Florida State 1-yard line. Royce Freeman rushed for a touchdown two plays later, and a pass from Taylor Alie to Christian French was successful to score a two-point conversion. Florida State failed to gain yardage on their second drive of the game and punted; after, Oregon drove to the Florida State 22-yard line and opted to go for it on 4th & 5. An incomplete pass meant a turnover on downs, giving the ball back to Florida State. Dalvin Cook rushed three times for 28 yards to reach midfield before Winston passes to Travis Rudolph and Bobo Wilson put FSU in the red zone. After additional rushes by Cook and Williams, Florida State failed to gain yardage on third and fourth down from the 1-yard line and therefore gave Oregon possession at that spot.

Rushes by Mariota and Thomas Tyner moved Oregon to their own 28-yard line, and the Ducks moved past midfield three plays later. They continued moving the ball but were unable to advance past the Florida State 11-yard line; they opted for a field goal on 4th & 6, and the 28-yard kick by Aidan Schneider was good, capping a 19-play drive. The Seminoles responded with a field goal drive of their own, spanning 65 yards over 13 plays. Florida State converted two third downs but on the third, from the Oregon 3-yard line, they were penalized for delay of game and pushed back to the 8-yard line; Aguayo made a 26-yard field goal to pull FSU within five points. On Oregon's next drive, they moved the ball into Florida State territory in five plays—despite an offensive pass interference penalty—and Tyner rushed for 23 yards to reach the Florida State 8-yard line shortly afterwards. After two short Mariota passes, Tyner rushed for a 1-yard touchdown with 2:18 remaining in the half. Kermit Whitfield returned the ensuing kickoff to the Florida State 29-yard line, and Winston passed to Williams for 24 yards and then to Ermon Lane for 17 yards early in the possession. Shortly after an Oregon penalty put FSU in the red zone, Williams rushed for a 10-yard touchdown to narrow the Oregon lead to five points. Each team concluded the half with a short, unsuccessful drive: Oregon's ended after Mariota's pass was intercepted by Nate Andrews on their third play, and Florida State's saw them advance to the Oregon 37-yard line in three plays before Aguayo missed a 54-yard field goal as time expired.

=== Second half ===
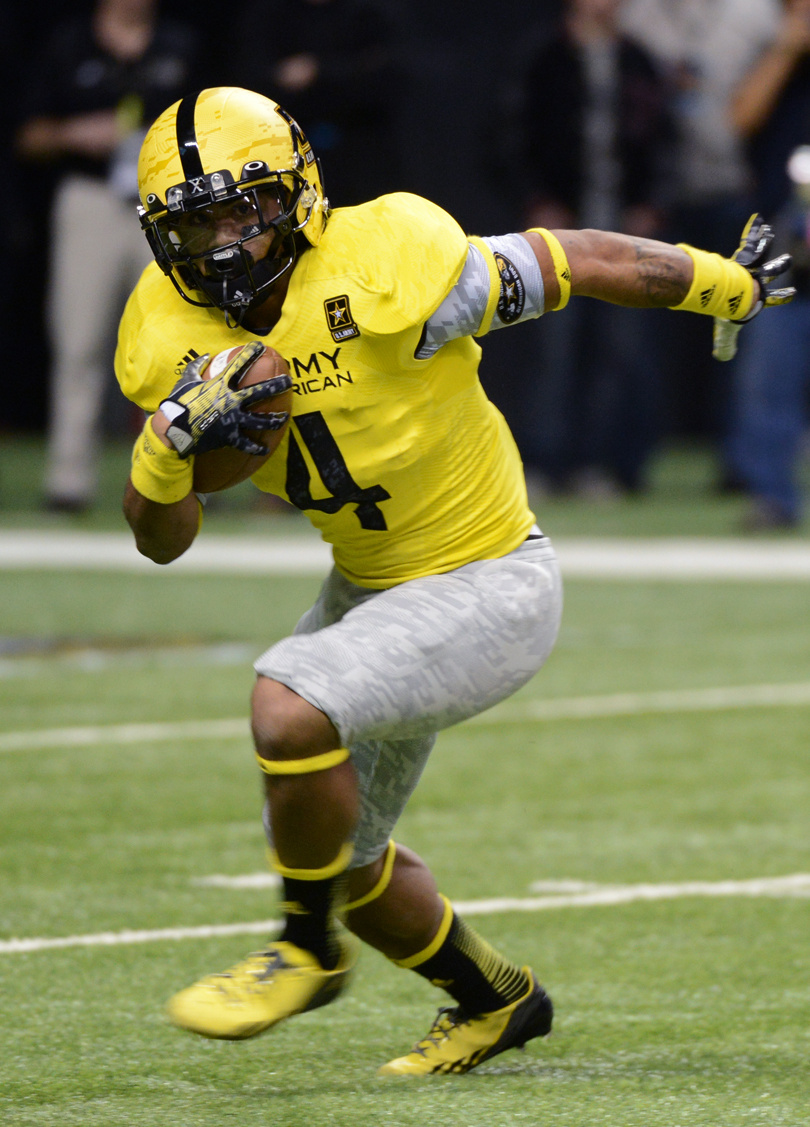
Thomas Tyner (pictured 2013) led all players in rushing with 124 yards and two touchdowns.

The third quarter began with Matt Wogan's kickoff, returned by Whitfield to the Florida State 20-yard line. The Seminoles immediately made gains of 20 and 18 yards on Winston passes to Rudolph and Rashad Greene, respectively, but the possession was cut short by a Cook fumble two plays later which was forced and recovered by Oregon's Derrick Malone at the Oregon 31-yard line. The Ducks similarly gained chunk yardage through the air early in their opening drive of the second half: Mariota passed for 34 yards to Carrington and then for 30 yards to Baylis, reaching the Seminoles' 11-yard line. Freeman carried the ball on the final two plays including a 3-yard touchdown rush. Florida State fumbled again on their next possession, on a sack of Winston by Tony Washington, though FSU retained possession as Winston recovered the ball for an 11-yard loss. Facing 3rd & 21 shortly after, Winston passed to Wilson for a 23-yard gain and a first down. The drive finished several plays later with Winston passes to Greene for 15 yards and then to Rudolph for an 18-yard score. Oregon began their next drive gaining 18 yards in one minute before a 56-yard touchdown pass from Mariota to Carrington; the PAT made Oregon's lead 32–20. FSU's next drive was cut short at their own 20-yard line after Dalvin Cook fumbled and the ball was recovered by Oregon's Reggie Daniels, who returned it to the Florida State 43. Oregon's ensuing 2-play drive saw a 30-yard Mariota-to-Carrington touchdown pass push their lead to 19 points with 4:21 remaining in the third quarter. Following a Florida State timeout early in their next drive, the Seminoles converted 3rd & 3 with a 16-yard pass to Williams. They gained 19 more on a Williams rush on the following play, but soon were faced with 4th & 5.

On the play, Winston slipped while throwing as he was trying to avoid a sack. This caused him to fumble, and the ball was returned 58 yards for a touchdown by Tony Washington to the Ducks' lead to 25 points. Writing for USA Today, Nick Schwartz said that this play "[summed] up" the Seminoles' "epic...collapse", and David Wharton of The Los Angeles Times opined that it was "the most embarrassing moment of the day". The ensuing PAT attempt by Aidan Schneider was blocked, keeping Oregon's lead to 45–20 with 1:26 remaining in the third quarter.

After a 28-yard kickoff return by Whitfield and a 16-yard pass completion from Winston to Rudolph, Winston threw his lone interception to Erick Dargan at the Florida State 43-yard line. Roughly a minute into the fourth quarter, Mariota rushed for a 23-yard touchdown. The Ducks scored again on a 21-yard Tyner rush less than four minutes later following FSU's fifth and final turnover of the game, a Bobo Wilson fumble at the Oregon 43-yard line. This made the score 59–20 and marked the final scoring play of the game; Florida State gained a net total of 12 yards on their final three drives, each of which was a three-and-out resulting in a punt, while Oregon's last drives resulted in a Jeff Lockie fumble, a punt, and a quarterback kneel to end the game. Winston did not finish the game; he was replaced by backup quarterback Sean Maguire for the Seminoles' final two offensive drives, though Maguire did not complete any of his three pass attempts.

=== Scoring summary ===
College Football Playoff Semifinal at the 2015 Rose Bowl Game

Quarter	1	2	3	4	Total
No. 2 Oregon	8	10	27	14	59
No. 3 Florida State	3	10	7	0	20

at Rose Bowl • Pasadena, California

- Date: January 1, 2015
- Game time: 2:00 p.m. PST
- Game weather: Sunny • Temperature: 57 °F (14 °C) • Wind: None
- Game attendance: 91,322
- Referee: Matt Austin (SEC)
- TV announcers (ESPN): Chris Fowler (play-by-play), Kirk Herbstreit (color), Heather Cox and Tom Rinaldi (sidelines)
- ESPN box score

Scoring summary

Quarter	Time	Drive			Team	Scoring information	Score	
Quarter	Time	Plays	Yards	TOP	Team	Scoring information	Oregon	Florida State
1	9:06	10	48	4:43	Florida State	28-yard field goal by Roberto Aguayo	0	3
1	6:55	9	73	2:11	Oregon	Royce Freeman 1-yard touchdown run, 2-point pass good	8	3
2	10:12	19	88	4:45	Oregon	28-yard field goal by Aidan Schneider	11	3
2	5:18	13	65	4:54	Florida State	26-yard field goal by Roberto Aguayo	11	6
2	2:18	10	75	3:00	Oregon	Thomas Tyner 1-yard touchdown run, Aidan Schneider kick good	18	6
2	0:36	6	71	1:35	Florida State	Karlos Williams 10-yard touchdown run, Roberto Aguayo kick good	18	13
3	11:54	5	69	1:32	Oregon	Royce Freeman 3-yard touchdown run, Aidan Schneider kick good	25	13
3	8:07	10	75	3:47	Florida State	Travis Rudolph 18-yard touchdown reception from Jameis Winston, Roberto Aguayo kick good	25	20
3	6:43	5	81	1:24	Oregon	Darren Carrington 56-yard touchdown reception from Marcus Mariota, Aidan Schneider kick good	32	20
3	4:21	2	43	0:21	Oregon	Darren Carrington 30-yard touchdown reception from Marcus Mariota, Aidan Schneider kick good	39	20
3	1:36	8	35	2:45	Oregon	Fumble recovery returned 58 yards for touchdown by Tony Washington, Aidan Schneider kick no good (blocked)	45	20
4	13:56	6	43	2:01	Oregon	Marcus Mariota 23-yard touchdown run, Aidan Schneider kick good	52	20
4	10:13	4	57	2:23	Oregon	Thomas Tyner 21-yard touchdown run, Aidan Schneider kick good	59	20
"TOP" = time of possession. For other American football terms, see Glossary of American football.							59	20

== Statistics ==
Team statistical comparison
Statistic	Oregon	Florida State
First downs	30	28
First downs rushing	17	10
First downs passing	12	17
First downs penalty	1	1
Third down efficiency	7–12	6–16
Fourth down efficiency	1–2	0–2
Total plays–net yards	81–639	87–528
Rushing attempts–net yards	45–301	39–180
Yards per rush	6.7	4.6
Yards passing	338	348
Pass completions–attempts	26–36	29–48
Interceptions thrown	1	1
Punt returns–total yards	0–0	0–0
Kickoff returns–total yards	3–48	9–186
Punts–average yardage	2–38.5	4–33.5
Fumbles–lost	2–1	7–4
Penalties–yards	6–50	6–48
Time of possession	27:17	32:43

Oregon statistics
Ducks passing
	C–A	Yds	TD–INT
Marcus Mariota	26–36	338	2–1
Ducks rushing
	Car	Yds	TD
Thomas Tyner	13	124	2
Marcus Mariota	8	62	1
Royce Freeman	12	44	2
Kani Benoit	4	40	0
Kenny Bassett	4	25	0
Byron Marshall	1	0	0
TEAM	1	−2	0
Jeff Lockie	2	−6	0
Ducks receiving
	Rec	Yds	TD
Darren Carrington	7	165	2
Evan Baylis	6	73	0
Charles Nelson	4	40	0
Dwayne Stanford	2	21	0
Byron Marshall	5	20	0
Royce Freeman	2	19	0

Florida State statistics
Seminoles passing
	C–A	Yds	TD–INT
Jameis Winston	29–45	348	1–1
Sean Maguire	0–3	0	0–0
Seminoles rushing
	Car	Yds	TD
Dalvin Cook	15	103	0
Karlos Williams	12	80	1
Ryan Green	2	7	0
Mario Pender	2	5	0
Jameis Winston	8	−15	0
Seminoles receiving
	Rec	Yds	TD
Travis Rudolph	6	96	1
Bobo Wilson	5	72	0
Karlos Williams	5	59	0
Rashad Greene	6	59	0
Dalvin Cook	3	24	0
Ermon Lane	2	22	0
Freddie Stevenson	1	12	0
Nick O'Leary	1	4	0

== Aftermath ==
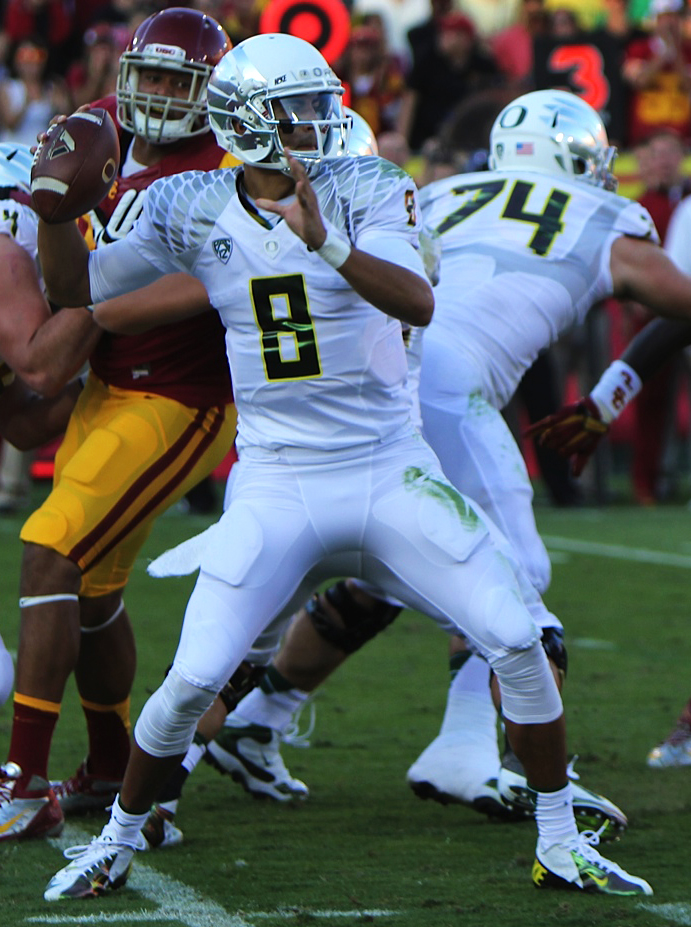
Marcus Mariota (pictured 2012) was named offensive MVP.

Oregon improved to 13–1 with the win and advanced to the 2015 College Football Playoff National Championship, their second national championship appearance and the first since the 2011 BCS National Championship Game against Auburn. The Ducks were ultimately defeated in the championship game by the No. 4 Ohio State Buckeyes and finished the season 13–2. Florida State ended its season at 13–1. This was FSU's first loss first since November 2012, ending a 29-game streak that was college football's longest in a decade. It was Winston's first loss in college; he had not lost a game as a starter since November 2011, during his senior year of high school. Ralph Russo of the Associated Press noted that turnovers had been a season-long issue for the Seminoles and that they "doomed" Florida State in this game.

Oregon quarterback Marcus Mariota was named offensive MVP for his 338 passing yards, 62 rushing yards, and three total touchdowns. Linebacker Tony Washington—who recorded four total tackles, including a sack, and returned Winston's third-quarter fumble for a touchdown–was named defensive MVP. In the 2015 NFL draft, Winston was selected first overall by the Tampa Bay Buccaneers, and Mariota was selected second by the Tennessee Titans. They were the only quarterbacks selected in the first round. They met in Week 1 of the 2015 NFL season, a 28-point win for Mariota and the Titans, leading Don Banks of Sports Illustrated to opine that Mariota "[looked] like the No. 1 pick". Winston and Mariota were each one of two players from their team to be taken in the first round along with Oregon defensive end Arik Armstead and Florida State center Cameron Erving.

- Oregon broke the record for the most points (59) scored in a Rose Bowl, surpassing the previous record of 49 (set in 1902, then tied in 1948 and 2008). Oregon's 41 points in the second half were also the most ever scored in one half of a Rose Bowl. Oregon set the Rose Bowl record for total offensive yards (639).
- The game featured both the 2013 and 2014 Heisman Trophy winners; for 2013: FSU quarterback Jameis Winston and for 2014: Oregon quarterback Marcus Mariota. This was only the third such meeting. Both quarterbacks would later be selected with the first and second overall picks in the 2015 NFL draft by the Buccaneers and Titans, respectively, and met in Week 1 of the 2015 NFL regular season with Mariota's Titans winning 42–14.
