= Mark Helfrich (American football) =

American football player and coach (born 1973)

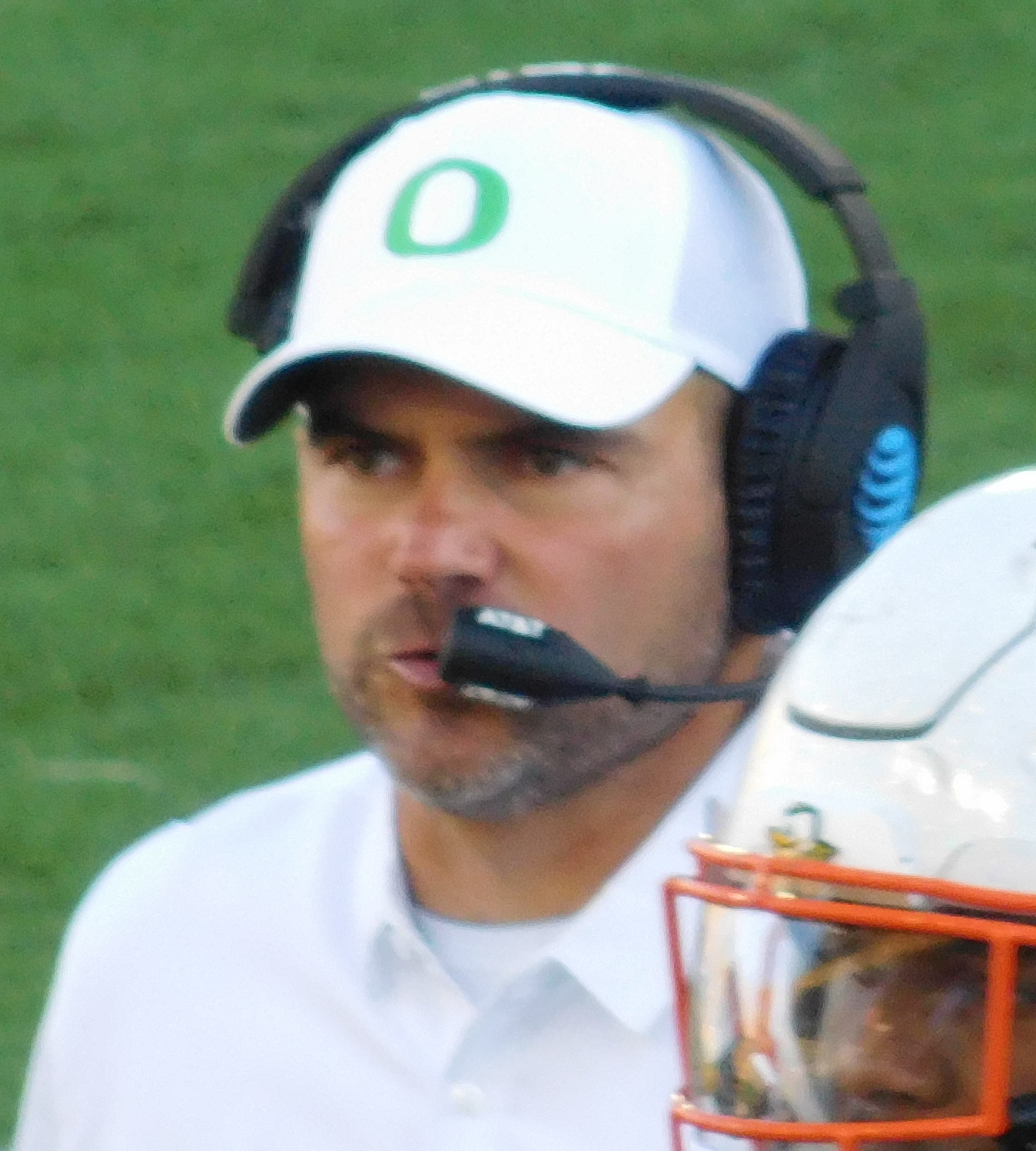
- Helfrich in 2016

No. 14
- Position: Quarterback

Personal information
- Born: October 28, 1973 (age 53); Coos Bay, Oregon, U.S.

Career information
- High school: Marshfield (Coos Bay)
- College: Southern Oregon
- NFL draft: 1995: undrafted

Career history

Playing
- Vienna Vikings (1997)

Coaching
- Southern Oregon (1996) Running backs coach; Oregon (1997) Graduate assistant; Vienna Vikings (1997) Offensive coordinator; Boise State (1998–2000) Quarterbacks coach; Arizona State (2001–2002) Quarterbacks coach; Arizona State (2003–2005) Passing game coordinator & quarterbacks coach; Colorado (2006–2008) Offensive coordinator & quarterbacks coach; Oregon (2009–2012) Offensive coordinator & quarterbacks coach; Oregon (2013–2016) Head coach; Chicago Bears (2018–2019) Offensive coordinator

Awards and highlights
- Pac-12 Championship (2014); 2× Pac-12 North Division champion (2013, 2014); 2× National Quarterbacks Coach of the Year (2010, 2012); Southern Oregon Raiders Hall of fame

Head coaching record
- Career: 37–16
- Coaching profile at Pro Football Reference

Mark August Helfrich (born October 28, 1973) is an American former football coach who is an analyst for Fox Sports. He was the head coach for the University of Oregon from 2013 to 2016. He most recently served as the offensive coordinator of the Chicago Bears from 2018 to 2019. He played professionally in the Austrian Football League (AFL).

== Playing career ==
Recruited out of Marshfield High School in Coos Bay, Oregon, Helfrich was offered an opportunity to walk on at the University of Oregon; however, he decided to attend Southern Oregon instead, where he was the starting quarterback from 1992 to 1995 and was a NAIA All-American. Helfrich saw his most successful season in 1993 as he set school records for passing yards, touchdowns, and total offense.

In the winter and spring of 1997, he played quarterback professionally, while also serving as assistant offensive coordinator in Europe for the Vienna Austria Vikings. The Vikings reached the Austrian Football League semi finals that season.

== Coaching career ==
=== Early coaching years ===
Initially starting graduate school with his sights set on becoming an orthopedic surgeon, Helfrich's coaching career ignited at Oregon as a graduate assistant working closely under then offensive coordinator, Dirk Koetter. When Koetter was hired as head coach at Boise State in 1998, the 24-year-old Helfrich went with him as the quarterbacks coach. At Boise State Helfrich coached Broncos quarterback Bart Hendricks. Under Helfrich's development, Hendricks won Big West Conference Player of the Year in 1999 and 2000 and guided the Broncos to the fourth best passing offense in the nation in 2000.

Helfrich followed Koetter to Arizona State when Koetter became the head coach of the Sun Devils. Under the coaching of Helfrich, Andrew Walter broke nearly every Arizona State passing record and John Elway's Pac-10 touchdown record. Walter would go on to be drafted in the third round of the 2005 NFL draft. Dirk Koetter would later praise Helfrich for his coaching abilities, "He can do it all in his head. He doesn't have to draw the pictures on the board (…) not many people can do that. He sees the game through the quarterback's eyes. We all have ideas, but if your quarterback can't execute those ideas, they are lines on a paper. Mark is as smart a football guy as I know."

In 2006, Helfrich joined the Colorado staff to become the youngest offensive coordinator in college football on the BCS level at the age of 32. His three seasons at Colorado were a challenge as he developed the Buffaloes dismal offense into a modest improvement. After the 2006 season, Mike Bellotti contacted Helfrich about possibly joining Oregon, but Helfrich declined to leave Colorado after only one season; Chip Kelly was hired instead. Two years later, Helfrich was named Oregon's offensive coordinator and quarterbacks coach, replacing Chip Kelly after he was promoted to head coach.

=== Oregon ===
==== Offensive coordinator (2009–2012) ====
During Helfrich's four seasons as Oregon's offensive coordinator the offense ranked highly nationally in several offensive categories and became well known for their extremely fast-paced offense built around speed. Although Chip Kelly called the plays on offense, Helfrich still played an integral role in Oregon's system. He had a large amount of involvement in the game planning, scripting, and coaching on a weekly basis while having a high amount of input in what plays are called and why they are called.

Kelly spoke highly of his protégé, "He's really, really smart and has great people skills. Sometimes, smart people can't get their point across, but he's a great communicator. When I hire people, I want to hire very, very smart people. I wanted somebody who came from a different system. I didn't want a yes-man. I wanted someone who would bring new ideas to our system."

With Helfrich coordinating under Chip Kelly, the Ducks played in four straight BCS bowls from 2009 to 2012, won three straight Pac-12 Conference championships, and continuously energized college football with one of the nation's best offenses in scoring, rushing, and total offense in each of those four seasons. As offensive coordinator during the Kelly era, the offense averaged 44.7 points per game with an average of 283.4 rushing yards and an average of 500.7 yards of total offense. Oregon's offense in 2012 was hailed as its best ever as they averaged 49.6 points per game with an average of 537.4 yards of total offense with 315.2 of those yards per game from rushing.

As quarterbacks coach, Helfrich was instrumental in the development of the quarterbacks that played under his tutelage at Oregon. In 2009, Jeremiah Masoli's leadership improved as he led Oregon to the 2010 Rose Bowl. The following season sophomore Darron Thomas guided an undefeated Oregon team to the 2011 BCS National Championship Game. Thomas finished his career 23–3 as a starter with a school-record 66 touchdown passes and led the Ducks to a 45–38 victory over #10 Wisconsin in the 2012 Rose Bowl. The 2012 season showcased Marcus Mariota as the first freshman to start a season opener for the Ducks in 22 seasons. He led the Ducks to a 12–1 record while being named All-Pac-12 Conference First Team, Pac-12 Freshman Offensive Player of the Year, and winning the 2013 Fiesta Bowl Offensive MVP Award as he guided the Ducks to a 35–17 victory over #5 Kansas State.

Helfrich was recognized for his impact on the Ducks' offensive success as he was named by FootballScoop as its National Quarterbacks Coach of the Year in 2010 and 2012, in addition to being one of three finalists as its national offensive coordinator of the year honor.

Rumors of Chip Kelly's departure from college football for the NFL were constant during his tenure as Oregon's coach. Kelly refused to accept the Tampa Bay Buccaneers offer as head coach weeks after the 2012 Rose Bowl victory because he couldn't get a promise from Oregon athletic director Rob Mullens assuring him that Helfrich would be his successor. When Kelly began to interview for numerous NFL head coaching positions after Oregon's 2013 Fiesta Bowl victory, it was rumored that a succession plan was put into place for Helfrich to be the next head coach of the Ducks if Kelly were to ever leave. On January 16, 2013, Kelly left Oregon to become the head coach of the Philadelphia Eagles.

==== Head coach (2013–2016) ====
On January 20, 2013, Helfrich accepted the offer from the University of Oregon to become the head coach of the Ducks. As the successor to Chip Kelly, Helfrich's promotion continued an Oregon tradition that would later end when Helfrich was fired after the 2016 season. He was the third consecutive Oregon offensive coordinator promoted to head coach. Before Kelly replaced Mike Bellotti in 2009, Bellotti succeeded Rich Brooks in 1995. Since Brooks' hire in 1977, Helfrich was just the fourth head coach at Oregon. The first Oregon native to become head coach of the Ducks since 1942, Helfrich described coaching at the University of Oregon as being the pinnacle of his career.

===== 2013 season =====
In his first season as head coach, Helfrich had the task of trying to emerge from the shadow of Chip Kelly. He departed from his predecessor's "blur" offense and implemented a more balanced attack that included a skilled passing game, resulting in an efficient offense that continued to score points and break offensive records.

Despite finishing with an 11–2 record and a top-ten final season ranking, Helfrich's first season leading the Ducks was considered a letdown. Losses to #6 Stanford and unranked Arizona (Oregon's first loss to an unranked opponent since 2008) kept the Ducks from reaching a fifth-consecutive BCS bowl berth. Helfrich did, however, lead his team to victory over Texas in the 2013 Alamo Bowl, dominating the Longhorns 30–7 in Mack Brown's final game as Texas head coach.

===== 2014 season =====
In Helfrich's second season, the Ducks won a school-record 13 games and reached the inaugural College Football Playoff National Championship. Quarterback Marcus Mariota became the first Oregon player to win the Heisman Trophy.

The season began with Oregon defeating No. 7 Michigan State, 46–27, ending the defending Big Ten and Rose Bowl-champion Spartans 11-game winning streak. After defeating No. 8 Arizona, 51–13, in the 2014 Pac-12 Football Championship Game, the Ducks played in the inaugural College Football Playoff, where they defeated the No. 3 Florida State Seminoles, 59–20, in the Playoff Semifinal Rose Bowl Game and ended the defending national champions 29-game winning streak. Oregon advanced to the College Football Championship Game against the Ohio State Buckeyes and lost, 42–20.

The Ducks finished the season with an overall 13–2 record and the No. 2 ranking in the final polls for the third time in program history. It was announced on February 9, 2015, that Helfrich had signed a five-year contract extension worth $17.5 million.

===== 2015 season =====
Helfrich's third season began and ended with historic losses. The Ducks early-season 42-point loss to Utah came with a total of 62 points allowed, the most points ever given up by the Ducks at home in Autzen Stadium. After a 3–3 start, Oregon fell out of the top 25 poll rankings for the first time since 2009 and started the season with two losses in September for the first time in 11 years.

Despite the rough start, Helfrich's team bounced back to win six straight games. Following back-to-back victories over #7 Stanford and #22 USC, the Ducks were selected to play No. 11 TCU in the Alamo Bowl.

The Ducks dominated TCU in the first half of the Alamo Bowl by scoring at will on consecutive drives and led 31–0 at halftime. However, Oregon's offense and defense collapsed in the second half after losing starting quarterback Vernon Adams Jr. to a head injury. TCU scored on every second-half possession and rallied for the biggest comeback in college football bowl game history to beat Oregon, 47–41, in triple overtime.

For the first time since 2007 the Ducks failed to win 10 games and finished with a 9–4 overall record. Following the Alamo Bowl loss, Helfrich demoted defensive coordinator Don Pellum to linebackers coach after Oregon's defense regressed to finish last in the Pac-12 in total defense and ranked 93rd or worse nationally in eight defensive categories.

===== 2016 season =====
Prior to the season, Helfrich made multiple adjustments to his coaching staff. After Scott Frost resigned as offensive coordinator in order to become the head coach at UCF in early December 2015, Helfrich promoted wide receivers coach and passing game coordinator Matt Lubick to offensive coordinator in early January 2016. Following the Alamo Bowl loss, Don Pellum was demoted to linebackers coach, replacing Erik Chinander, who left to become the defensive coordinator for Frost at UCF. In mid-January 2016, David Yost was hired as Oregon's passing game coordinator and quarterbacks coach. Replacing Pellum as defensive coordinator was former Michigan head football coach Brady Hoke, who was hired on January 16.

Helfrich and Oregon agreed to part ways on November 29, 2016, following a 4–8 season, Oregon's worst record in 25 years and first losing season since 2004. It also saw the first non-sellout crowds at Autzen Stadium since 2002.

=== Chicago Bears ===
On January 12, 2018, Helfrich was hired by the Chicago Bears to serve as the offensive coordinator.

Although Helfrich was not the play-caller, the Bears ended the 2019 season with the 29th-ranked offense and an 8–8 record. He was fired two days after the season.

== Broadcasting career ==
After departing from Oregon, Helfrich spent the 2017 season as an analyst for Fox Sports. He joined Fox Sports again in 2020 after his termination from the Bears coaching staff.

== Awards ==
- 2010 National Quarterbacks Coach of the Year (FootballScoop)
- 2012 National Quarterbacks Coach of the Year (FootballScoop)

== Head coaching record ==
Year	Team	Overall	Conference	Standing	Bowl/playoffs	Coaches^{#}	AP^{°}
Oregon Ducks (Pac-12 Conference) (2013–2016)
2013	Oregon	11–2	7–2	T–1st (North)	W Alamo	9	9
2014	Oregon	13–2	8–1	1st (North)	W Rose^{†}, L CFP NCG^{†}	2	2
2015	Oregon	9–4	7–2	2nd (North)	L Alamo	20	19
2016	Oregon	4–8	2–7	6th (North)			
Oregon:		37–16	24–12				
Total:		37–16					
National championship Conference title Conference division title or championship game berth
^{†}Indicates CFP / New Years' Six bowl.; ^{#}Rankings from final Coaches Poll.
