= 2014–15 College Football Playoff =

Postseason college football tournament

- Season: 2014
- Dates: January 1–12, 2015
- Teams invited: (1) Alabama; (2) Oregon; (3) Florida State; (4) Ohio State
- Venues: AT&T Stadium; Mercedes-Benz Superdome; Rose Bowl
- Champions: Ohio State (1st CFP title, 8th overall title)

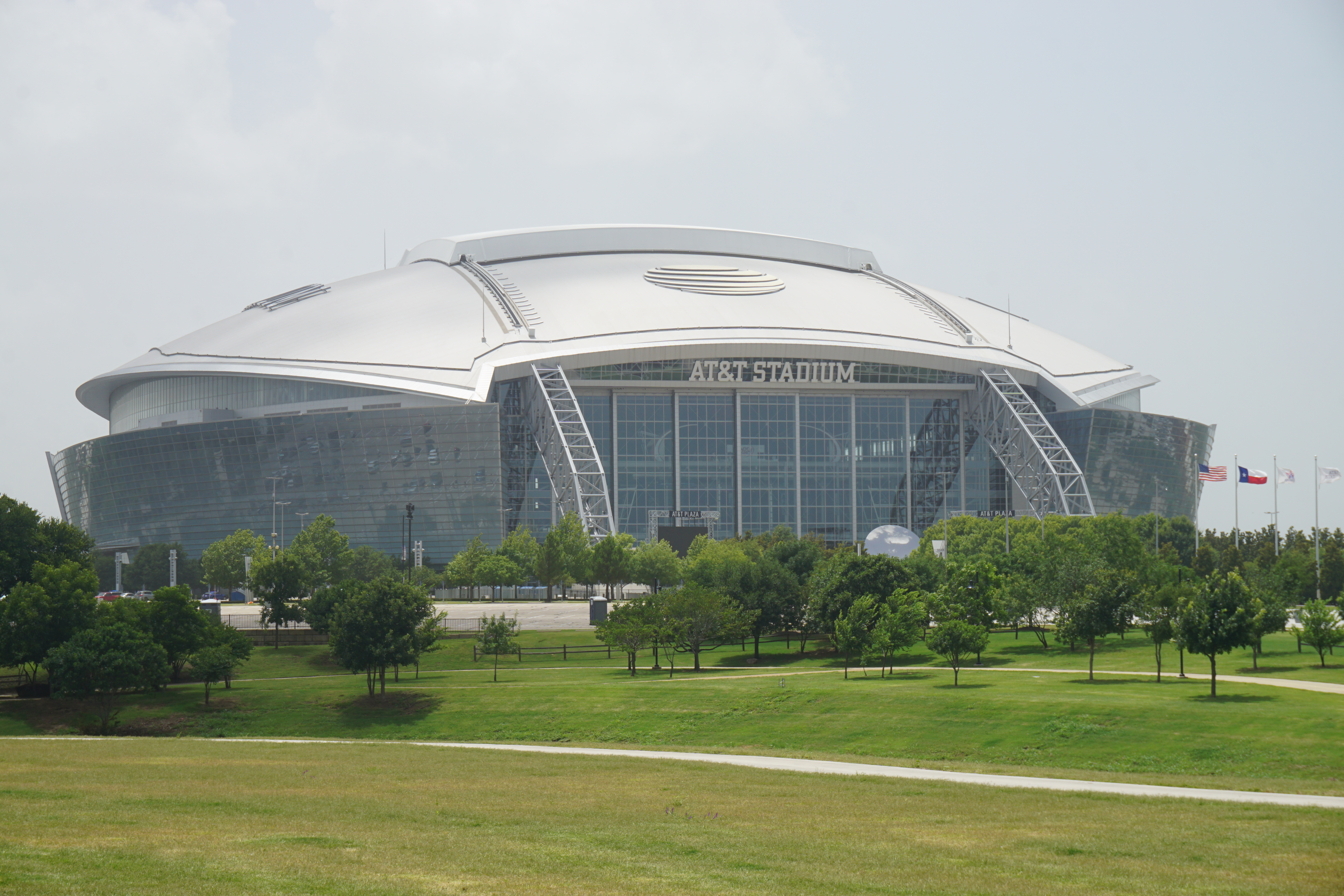
AT&T Stadium in Arlington, Texas, hosted the inaugural College Football Playoff National Championship.

The 2014–15 College Football Playoff was a single-elimination postseason tournament that determined the national champion of the 2014 NCAA Division I FBS football season. It was the inaugural edition of the College Football Playoff (CFP) and involved the top four teams in the country as ranked by the College Football Playoff poll playing in two semifinals, with the winners of each advancing to the national championship game. Each participating team was the champion of its respective conference: No. 1 Alabama from the Southeastern Conference, No. 2 Oregon from the Pac-12 Conference, No. 3 Florida State from the Atlantic Coast Conference, and No. 4 Ohio State from the Big Ten Conference.

The playoff bracket's semifinal games were held at the Rose Bowl and Sugar Bowl on New Year's Day, part of the season's slate of bowl games. In the Rose Bowl semifinal, Oregon defeated Florida State by a margin of thirty-nine points. The second semifinal, at the Sugar Bowl, Ohio State upset Alabama by seven. As a result of their victories, Ohio State and Oregon faced each other in the national championship game, held on January 12 in Arlington, Texas. In that game, Ohio State defeated Oregon, 42–20, to win the first CFP national championship and their eighth national championship in school history.

The victory was Ohio State's first championship since the 2003 Fiesta Bowl and the third for head coach Urban Meyer. Ohio State running back Ezekiel Elliott won Most Valuable Player honors after scoring four touchdowns in the national championship game, which broke viewership records and became the most-watched cable television broadcast in history with an average viewership of over 33 million. The playoff semifinals finished the sweep as the Sugar Bowl (28.27 million) and Rose Bowl (28.16 million) slotted in as the second- and third-most-viewed cable broadcasts.

== Bracket ==
Semifinals
January 1 – Sugar Bowl; Mercedes-Benz Superdome, New Orleans
1	Alabama	35
4	Ohio State	42
January 1 – Rose Bowl; Rose Bowl Stadium, Pasadena
2	Oregon	59
3	Florida State	20

Championship
January 12 – National Championship; AT&T Stadium, Arlington
4	Ohio State	42
2	Oregon	20

== Selection and teams ==
The inaugural CFP selection committee was announced on October 16, 2013, with Arkansas athletic director Jeff Long as the chairman. Its other members were former Nebraska head coach Tom Osborne, former quarterback Archie Manning, former United States secretary of state Condoleezza Rice, Wisconsin athletic director Barry Alvarez, former United States Air Force Academy superintendent Michael C. Gould, USC athletic director Pat Haden, former NCAA executive vice president Tom Jernstedt, West Virginia athletic director Oliver Luck, Clemson athletic director Dan Radakovich, former USA Today reporter Steve Wieberg, and former college head coach Tyrone Willingham.

The first CFP rankings were released on October 28, 2014. Four of the top six teams—Mississippi State, Auburn, Ole Miss, and Alabama—were from the Southeastern Conference (SEC), and they were joined by Florida State from the Atlantic Coast Conference (ACC) and Oregon from the Pac-12 Conference. Later that week, No. 3 Auburn defeated No. 4 Ole Miss, 35–31, in what the Associated Press called "the first College Football Playoff knockout game". As a result, Ole Miss dropped to No. 11 in the rankings and TCU rose to No. 6, making them the first Big 12 team to be ranked in the CFP top six. Arizona State made their debut in the top six in the third rankings release after Auburn's loss to unranked Texas A&M dropped them to No. 9. The Sun Devils suffered a loss to Oregon State the following week, dropping them back out of the top six, and a win by No. 5 Alabama over No. 1 Mississippi State vaulted the Crimson Tide to the top spot while dropping Mississippi State to fourth place. The top six remained the same in the following week's rankings, and Mississippi State dropped out of the top six in the penultimate rankings following their loss to No. 19 Ole Miss. Baylor moved up to No. 6 to replace them.

The next week saw many conferences play their championship games. No. 2 Oregon began the week by defeating No. 7 Arizona, 51–14, to win the Pac-12 Championship on December 5. The following day, No. 1 Alabama defeated No. 16 Missouri to win the SEC Championship and No. 4 Florida State beat No. 11 Georgia Tech for the ACC title. All three winners were expected to be selected for the playoffs. The fourth spot was more contentious; No. 3 TCU and No. 6 Baylor concluded their respective regular seasons with wins over Iowa State and No. 9 Kansas State, respectively, giving them both an 11–1 record and a share of the Big 12 championship, while No. 5 Ohio State won the Big Ten Championship over No. 13 Wisconsin in a 59–0 shutout, giving the Buckeyes a 12–1 record.

The inaugural semifinal pairings were announced alongside the rest of the top 25 during the release of the final CFP rankings on December 7, 2014. Ohio State was awarded the final spot in the bracket over Baylor and TCU, and joined Alabama, Oregon, and Florida State to make up the four-team field. Alabama was awarded the No. 1 spot and were placed in the Sugar Bowl to face No. 4 Ohio State, while No. 2 Oregon and No. 3 Florida State were assigned to the Rose Bowl. Baylor and TCU finished No. 5 and No. 6, respectively. Each were assigned to one of the remaining New Year's Six bowl games: Baylor was scheduled to face No. 8 Michigan State in the Cotton Bowl Classic and TCU drew No. 9 Ole Miss in the Peach Bowl—the latter was described as a "consolation prize" by the Associated Press. These final rankings generated some controversy, even before their release; on the morning of December 7, Forbes' Mike Ozanian criticized the College Football Playoff system and the makeup of the selection committee. The exclusion of both Big 12 teams generated criticism that the system had not solved the problems of the BCS, and Big 12 commissioner Bob Bowlsby remarked that his conference had been punished for its lack of a conference championship game. (Note: Under NCAA rules at the time, the Big 12 was not permitted to stage a conference championship game since they only had ten teams (the minimum was twelve) and did not obtain a waiver from the NCAA.)

2014 College Football Playoff rankings top six progression
No.	Week 9	Week 10	Week 11	Week 12	Week 13	Week 14	Final
1	Mississippi State (7–0)	Mississippi State (8–0)	Mississippi State (9–0)	Alabama (9–1)	Alabama (10–1)	Alabama (11–1)	Alabama (12–1)
2	Florida State (7–0)	Florida State (8–0)	Oregon (9–1)	Oregon (9–1)	Oregon (10–1)	Oregon (11–1)	Oregon (12–1)
3	Auburn (6–1)	Auburn (7–1)	Florida State (9–0)	Florida State (10–0)	Florida State (11–0)	TCU (10–1)	Florida State (13–0)
4	Ole Miss (7–1)	Oregon (8–1)	TCU (8–1)	Mississippi State (9–1)	Mississippi State (10–1)	Florida State (12–0)	Ohio State (12–1)
5	Oregon (7–1)	Alabama (7–1)	Alabama (8–1)	TCU (9–1)	TCU (9–1)	Ohio State (11–1)	Baylor (11–1)
6	Alabama (7–1)	TCU (7–1)	Arizona State (8–1)	Ohio State (9–1)	Ohio State (10–1)	Baylor (10–1)	TCU (11–1)

Key: Team increased ranking from previous week Team decreased ranking from previous week Team selected to College Football Playoff

== Playoff games ==
=== Semifinals ===
==== Rose Bowl ====
2015 Rose Bowl

Quarter	1	2	3	4	Total
No. 2 Oregon	8	10	27	14	59
No. 3 Florida State	3	10	7	0	20

at the Rose Bowl • Pasadena, California

- Date: January 1, 2015
- Game time: 2:00 p.m. PST

The Rose Bowl began the inaugural College Football Playoff on January 1 with the matchup between No. 2 Oregon and No. 3 Florida State in the teams' first-ever meeting. Florida State began the scoring with a field goal on their first drive, and Oregon responded with a touchdown followed by a two-point conversion. The Ducks maintained their five-point lead into halftime after each team scored a touchdown and a field goal in the second quarter. After the teams traded touchdowns to begin the second half, Oregon went on a run of 34 unanswered points in less than thirteen minutes, helped by four Florida State turnovers to Oregon's one. The game was the 101st edition of the Rose Bowl and the first in which a team scored more than 50 points. It also marked the end of the Seminoles' 29-game unbeaten streak. The win put Oregon through to the National Championship to face the Sugar Bowl champion.

==== Sugar Bowl ====
2015 Sugar Bowl

Quarter	1	2	3	4	Total
No. 4 Ohio State	6	14	14	8	42
No. 1 Alabama	14	7	7	7	35

at Mercedes-Benz Superdome • New Orleans, Louisiana

- Date: January 1, 2015
- Game time: 8:00 p.m. CST

The second CFP semifinal, hosted at the Sugar Bowl, was played between No. 1 Alabama and No. 4 Ohio State. It was the teams' fourth all-time meeting and the first since 1995. Both teams scored twice in the game's first quarter, Ohio State on two field goals and Alabama on two touchdowns, the first of which came after a fumble by Ezekiel Elliott. The Crimson Tide scored first in the second quarter following an interception by Cyrus Jones, though Ohio State responded with two touchdowns to narrow the deficit to one point entering halftime. After scoring first to begin the third quarter, Ohio State did not give up the lead, and they cemented their win on an 85-yard rush by Elliott late in the fourth quarter. The upset improved the Buckeyes to 13–1 and sent them to face Oregon in the National Championship.

=== Championship game ===
2015 College Football Playoff National Championship

Quarter	1	2	3	4	Total
No. 4 Ohio State	14	7	7	14	42
No. 2 Oregon	7	3	10	0	20

at AT&T Stadium • Arlington, Texas

- Date: January 12, 2015
- Game time: 7:30 p.m. CST

By virtue of their semifinal victories, No. 2 Oregon and No. 4 Ohio State met in the National Championship Game for the first time since the 2010 Rose Bowl. Oregon led early after capping their first drive with a Marcus Mariota touchdown pass, though Ohio State scored two touchdowns later in the quarter and ultimately took an eleven-point lead into halftime following scores from Cardale Jones, Ezekiel Elliott, and Nick Vannett. A long touchdown reception by Byron Marshall, coupled with a later field goal, brought the Ducks within one point of Ohio State midway through the third quarter, but a second touchdown rush by Elliott gave Ohio State an eight-point advantage as the quarter expired. Elliott added two touchdowns in the fourth quarter, ultimately giving the Buckeyes a twenty-two point victory and earning himself offensive MVP honors. The game ended with an interception, the fifth turnover of the contest, securing Ohio State the national championship win.

== Aftermath ==
This was Ohio State's first national championship since their victory in the 2003 Fiesta Bowl, and it was the third for Urban Meyer, who had won titles with Florida in the 2007 and 2009 BCS championships. The Buckeyes finished the season with a 14–1 record, and the Ducks fell to 13–2 following their championship game loss.

All three playoff games were televised on ESPN; the championship, which averaged over 33 million viewers, became the new most-watched cable broadcast. The Sugar Bowl and Rose Bowl placed second and third all-time, respectively, with 28.27 million and 28.16 million viewers each. The national championship was also the most-streamed ESPN broadcast outside of the FIFA World Cup. The title game earned a Nielsen rating of 18.2, also a cable television record.
