= 2015 College Football Playoff National Championship =

2015 College Football Playoff National Championship presented by AT&T
- 1st College Football Playoff National Championship
Ohio State Buckeyes	Oregon Ducks
(13–1)	(13–1)
Big Ten	Pac-12
42	20
Head coach: Urban Meyer	Head coach: Mark Helfrich
AP / Coaches / CFP; 5 / 4 / 4	AP / Coaches / CFP; 3 / 3 / 2
	1	2	3	4	Total
Ohio State	14	7	7	14	42
Oregon	7	3	10	0	20
- Date: January 12, 2015
- Season: 2014
- Stadium: AT&T Stadium
- Location: Arlington, Texas
- MVP: Ezekiel Elliott (Ohio State, RB); Tyvis Powell (Ohio State, S)
- Favorite: Oregon by 5.5
- National anthem: Lady Antebellum
- Referee: Greg Burks (Big 12)
- Attendance: 85,689

United States TV coverage
- Network: ESPN
- Announcers: Chris Fowler, Kirk Herbstreit, Heather Cox, and Tom Rinaldi; Eduardo Varela and Pablo Viruega; Mike Tirico, Todd Blackledge, Holly Rowe, and Joe Schad
- Nielsen ratings: 18.9 (33.4 million viewers)

The 2015 College Football Playoff National Championship was a college football bowl game played on January 12, 2015, at AT&T Stadium in Arlington, Texas. The inaugural College Football Playoff National Championship, which replaced the BCS National Championship Game, the game determined a national champion of the NCAA Division I Football Bowl Subdivision (FBS) for the 2014 season. Aside from the all-star games following after, this was the culminating game of the 2014–15 bowl season. Sponsored by telecommunications company AT&T, the game was officially known as the 2015 College Football Playoff National Championship presented by AT&T. The national title was contested through a four-team bracket system, the College Football Playoff, which replaced the previous Bowl Championship Series.

The game was played between the winners of two designated semi-final bowl games played on January 1, 2015: the No. 4 Ohio State Buckeyes, who upset No. 1 Alabama 42–35 in the 2015 Sugar Bowl, and the No. 2 Oregon Ducks, who defeated previously unbeaten No. 3 Florida State 59–20 in the 2015 Rose Bowl. This was the first championship game since 2006 that did not feature at least one SEC team, and the teams' first meeting since the 2010 Rose Bowl, which the Buckeyes won 26–17.

The Ohio State Buckeyes won the game, 42–20, marking the first national championship awarded under the CFP system. Following the game, the AP Poll and Coaches' Poll also named Ohio State as their top team of the season, marking Ohio State's first national championship since 2002 and their 8th overall. Following the game, the next national championship game to not feature a team from the SEC was the 2024 edition of the championship.

== Background ==
AT&T Stadium (capacity 80,000) was announced as the host site in April 2013. Arlington and Tampa (Raymond James Stadium) were the only cities to submit hosting bids for the inaugural title game.

Each team received 20,000 tickets. Premium seat packages for the event cost $1,899 to $3,899 apiece. The packages can include hotel accommodations, game tickets, parking access, pregame hospitality, and an on-field postgame experience.

College Football Playoff announced that 1,000 tickets will be made available for purchase to fans who have signed up for a random drawing by May 1, 2014. On March 25, 2014, Dr Pepper was announced as the official championship partner and presenting sponsor of the new College Football Playoff National Championship Trophy.

The cost of a thirty-second commercial during the game broadcast reached upwards of $1 million.

== Pregame show ==
Before the game, students dressed in all black from the Episcopal School of Dallas and Saint Philip's School held 15 ft. tall banners of every collegiate football team and marched to Fall Out Boy's "Centuries." The students then held out a large American Flag while country music band Lady Antebellum performed the "Star Spangled Banner." The students ran off the field carrying the flag. One student tripped while running off and was dragged hanging onto the flag by the rest, then helped him up off field.

== Teams ==
The teams playing for the national championship were the winners of semifinal bowl games held on January 1, 2015. The semifinal games were the Rose Bowl in Pasadena and the Sugar Bowl in New Orleans. The semifinal participants were chosen and ranked 1–4 by the 13-member playoff selection committee, with 1 playing 4 and 2 playing 3.

=== Ohio State ===
Ohio State was 20–24 all-time in bowl games. The Buckeyes made their fifth visit to the state of Texas, having won 4 previous games and outscoring four different schools 120–33. Ohio State, all-time, came into the game with an 8–0 record against Oregon. This was the team's first national championship game appearance since 2008.

=== Oregon ===
Oregon is 13–15 all-time in bowl games. The Ducks are 6–4 in Texas having won three straight games and played their third game in the Dallas-Fort Worth metroplex (Dallas, Fort Worth and now Arlington).

== Starting lineups ==
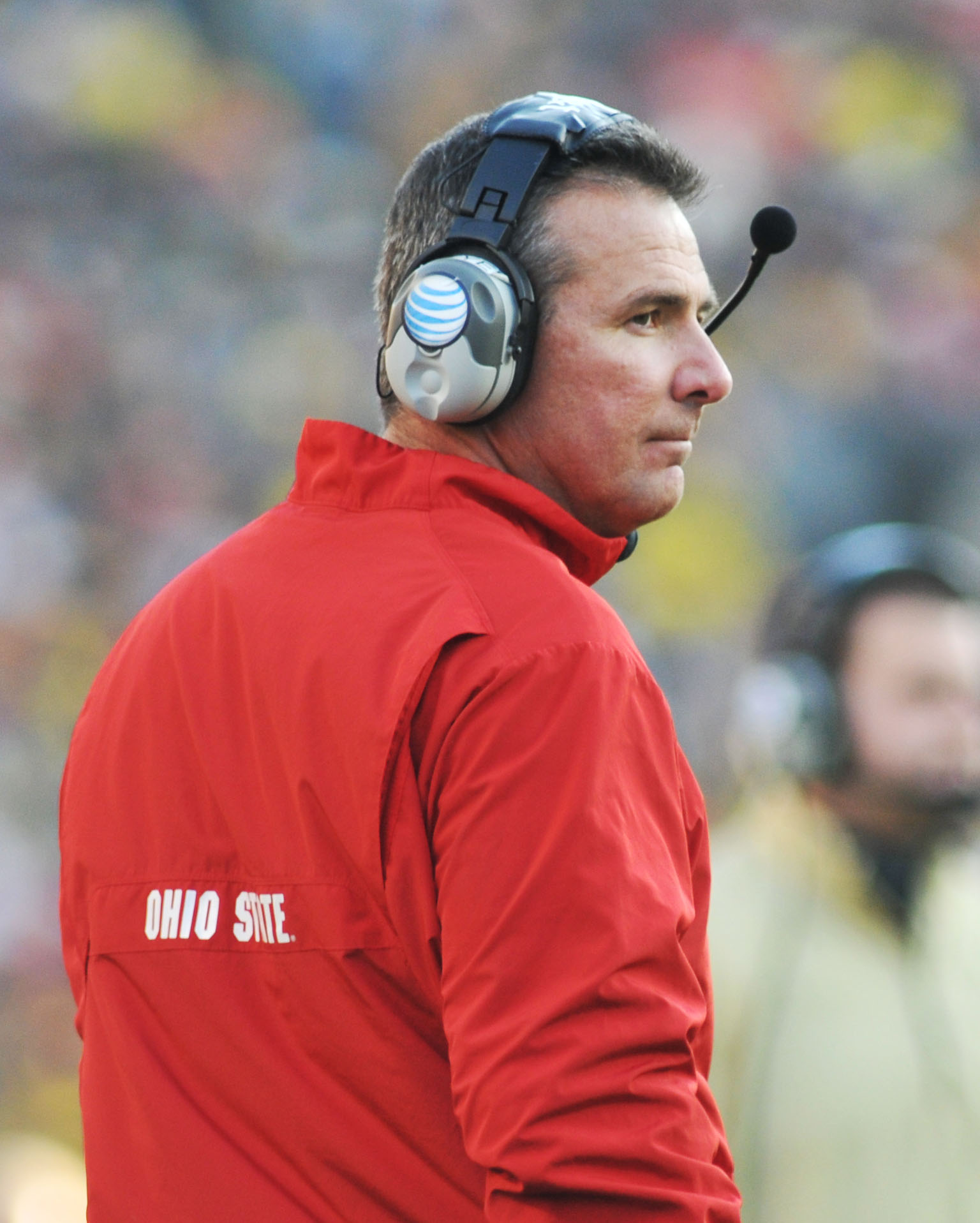
Ohio State head coach Urban Meyer

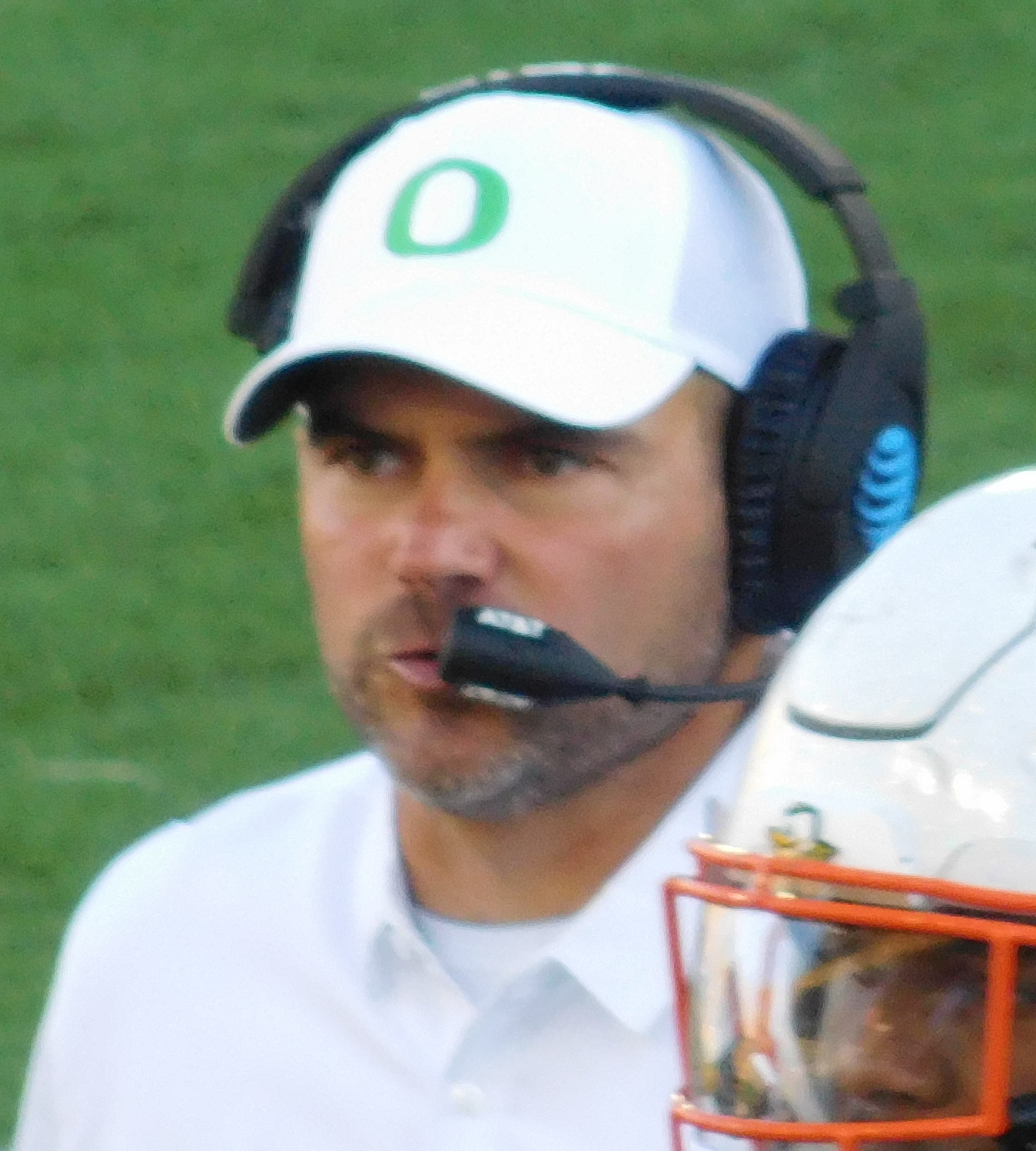
Oregon head coach Mark Helfrich

Ohio State	Position		Oregon
Offense
Devin Smith 2	WR		Byron Marshall
Michael Thomas 2	WR		Keanon Lowe
Taylor Decker 1	LT		†Jake Fisher 2
Billy Price 1	LG		Hamani Stevens
Jacoby Boren	C		†Hroniss Grasu 3
Pat Elflein 3	RG		Cameron Hunt
Darryl Baldwin	RT		Tyrell Crosby 5
Jeff Heuerman 3	TE		Evan Baylis
Evan Spencer 6	WR		Dwayne Stanford
Cardale Jones 4	QB		†Marcus Mariota 1
Ezekiel Elliott 1	RB		Thomas Tyner
Defense
†Joey Bosa 1	DE		Arik Armstead 1
Michael Bennett 6	DT	NG	Alex Balducci
Adolphus Washington 3	DT	DE	DeForest Buckner 1
Steve Miller	DE	OLB	Tony Washington
Darron Lee 1	SLB	ILB	Rodney Hardrick
Curtis Grant	MLB	ILB	Derrick Malone
Joshua Perry 4	WLB	OLB	Tyson Coleman
Doran Grant 4	CB		Chris Seisay
Eli Apple 1	CB		Troy Hill
Vonn Bell 2	S	DB	Erick Dargan
Tyvis Powell	S		Reggie Daniels
† = 2014 All-American
Selected in an NFL Draft (number corresponds to draft round)

=== First half ===
Oregon received the opening kickoff and drove down the field for a touchdown, earning an early 7–0 lead on a 7-yard TD pass from Marcus Mariota to Keanon Lowe. After an exchange of punts, Ohio State started their second possession at their own 5 yard line. On 3rd and 8, Cardale Jones completed a 26-yard pass to wideout Corey Smith for a 1st down. Ohio State then converted a 4th and 3 from the Oregon 38 yard line to keep the drive alive. On the very next play, Ezekiel Elliott broke several tackles for a 33-yard TD scamper, tying the game at 7. A dropped pass on the Ducks next drive led to a punt, which Ohio State returned to the Oregon 46 yard line. A critical pass interference call set Ohio State up near the goal line, and the Buckeyes capitalized with a 1-yard TD pass from Jones to tight end Nick Vanett. The first quarter ended with Ohio State leading Oregon 14–7. After another Oregon punt, the Buckeyes had a chance to stretch their lead, but a mishandled exchange between Jones and Elliott gave Oregon the ball back. The Ducks marched to the goal line, but failed on 4th and Goal from the 3 yard line. Ohio State escaped the shadow of the goal line, and drove 90 yards, but WR Corey Smith fumbled at the Oregon 11-yard line. Despite the reprieve, the Ducks once again had to punt, and this time, Ohio State made them pay. A Cardale Jones QB sneak from a yard out gave Ohio State a 21–7 lead. Oregon closed out the first half scoring with a field goal, leaving the Buckeyes ahead 21–10 at the break.

=== Second half ===
Ohio State got the ball to begin the second half and drove into Oregon territory. However, Jones threw an interception at the Oregon 30 yard line. The Ducks capitalized on this turnover immediately, with Marcus Mariota finding wide receiver Byron Marshall for a 70-yard touchdown on the first play after the turnover, bringing the Ducks within 21–17. On the next Ohio State drive, Tyson Coleman sacked Jones, and recovered the resulting fumble, setting up an Oregon field goal. The 1 point deficit at the 6:39 mark of the 3rd quarter was as close as Oregon would come. Ohio State closed out the quarter with a 75-yard drive, culminating in a 9-yard Ezekiel Elliott touchdown run. The 4th quarter began with an Oregon punt, and Ohio State went 76 yards for another touchdown, with Elliott finding paydirt from 2 yards out for a 35-20 Ohio State lead. A desperate Oregon went for it on 4th and 11 at their own 14 with under 3 minutes to play, but failed. The Buckeyes iced the game on Elliott's 4th touchdown run of the game, providing the final 42–20 margin.

=== Scoring summary ===
2015 College Football Playoff National Championship

Quarter	1	2	3	4	Total
No. 4 Ohio State	14	7	7	14	42
No. 2 Oregon	7	3	10	0	20

at AT&T Stadium • Arlington, Texas

- Date: Monday, January 12, 2015
- Game time: 7:30 p.m. CST
- Game weather: Indoors
- Game attendance: 85,689
- Referee: Greg Burks (Big 12)
- TV announcers (ESPN): Chris Fowler (play-by-play), Kirk Herbstreit (analyst), Heather Cox and Tom Rinaldi (sidelines)
- Box score

Scoring summary

Quarter	Time	Drive			Team	Scoring information	Score	
Quarter	Time	Plays	Yards	TOP	Team	Scoring information	ORE	OSU
1	12:21	11	75	2:39	ORE	Keanon Lowe 7-yard touchdown reception from Marcus Mariota, Aidan Schneider kick good	7	0
1	4:36	10	97	3:16	OSU	Ezekiel Elliott 33-yard touchdown run, Sean Nuernberger kick good	7	7
1	1:08	4	46	1:27	OSU	Nick Vannett 1-yard touchdown reception from Cardale Jones, Sean Nuernberger kick good	7	14
2	4:49	6	49	2:16	OSU	Cardale Jones 1-yard touchdown run, Sean Nuernberger kick good	7	21
2	0:48	12	66	4:01	ORE	26-yard field goal by Aidan Schneider	10	21
3	11:23	1	70	0:10	ORE	Byron Marshall 70-yard touchdown reception from Marcus Mariota, Aidan Schneider kick good	17	21
3	6:39	6	17	1:42	ORE	23-yard field goal by Aidan Schneider	20	21
3	0:00	12	75	6:39	OSU	Ezekiel Elliott 9-yard touchdown run, Sean Nuernberger kick good	20	28
4	9:44	9	76	4:13	OSU	Ezekiel Elliott 2-yard touchdown run, Sean Nuernberger kick good	20	35
4	0:28	5	14	2:17	OSU	Ezekiel Elliott 1-yard touchdown run, Sean Nuernberger kick good	20	42
"TOP" = time of possession. For other American football terms, see Glossary of American football.							20	42

=== Statistics ===
Statistics	Oregon	Ohio State
First downs	20	28
Plays–yards	71–465	84–538
Rushes–yards	33–132	61–296
Passing yards	333	242
Passing: Comp–Att–Int	24–38–1	16–23–1
Time of possession	22:31	37:29

=== Individual statistics ===
Oregon passing
	C/ATT^{1}	Yds	TD	INT
Marcus Mariota	24/37	333	2	1
Oregon rushing
	Car^{2}	Yds	TD	LG^{3}
Thomas Tyner	12	62	0	12
Marcus Mariota	10	39	0	8
Royce Freeman	10	22	0	8
Byron Marshall	1	9	0	9
Oregon receiving
	Rec^{4}	Yds	TD	LG^{3}
Byron Marshall	8	169	1	70
Dwayne Stanford	4	61	0	28
Keanon Lowe	3	55	1	28
Evan Baylis	5	25	0	9
Charles Nelson	2	21	0	14
Thomas Tyner	2	2	0	3

Ohio State passing
	C/ATT^{1}	Yds	TD	INT
Cardale Jones	16/23	242	1	1
Ohio State rushing
	Car^{2}	Yds	TD	LG^{3}
Ezekiel Elliott	36	246	4	33
Cardale Jones	21	38	1	17
Curtis Samuel	1	6	0	6
Corey Smith	1	3	0	3
Jalin Marshall	2	3	0	5
Ohio State receiving
	Rec^{4}	Yds	TD	LG^{3}
Corey Smith	2	76	0	50
Michael Thomas	4	53	0	23
Jalin Marshall	5	52	0	26
Devin Smith	1	45	0	45
Nick Vannett	2	9	1	8
Curtis Samuel	1	8	0	8
Ezekiel Elliott	1	-1	0	-1

^{1}Completions/attempts
^{2}Carries
^{3}Long gain
^{4}Receptions

== Broadcasting ==
The game was televised by ESPN with Chris Fowler and Kirk Herbstreit as English commentators, and Heather Cox and Tom Rinaldi as English sideline reporters and on ESPN Deportes with Eduardo Varela and Pablo Viruega as Spanish commentators. ESPN revived the Megacast coverage it had employed during the 2014 BCS National Championship Game: other ESPN networks (including ESPN2, ESPNEWS, ESPN Classic, ESPNU, and ESPN3) supplemented coverage with analysis and additional perspectives of the game.

Approximately 33.4 million watched the game. The game set a cable television record for ratings, receiving an 18.5 Nielsen rating.

The game was broadcast on nationwide radio by ESPN Radio with Mike Tirico and Todd Blackledge on the call, with Holly Rowe and Joe Schad on the sidelines. Locally, the game was broadcast on radio by the Oregon IMG Sports Network flagshiped by KUGN (NewsTalk 590) in Eugene, Oregon with Jerry Allen (play-by-play) and Mike Jorgensen (color commentator), and by the Ohio State IMG Sports Network flagshiped by WBNS-AM (1460 ESPN Columbus) and WBNS-FM (97.1 The Fan) in Columbus, Ohio with Paul Keels (play-by-play), Jim Lachey (color commentator) and Marty Bannister on the sidelines.

== Aftermath ==
Following the game, fans took to the streets of Columbus, Ohio, to celebrate. Fans tore down a temporary goalpost at Ohio Stadium. 89 fires were reported, and members of the Columbus Police Department used tear gas to disperse crowds. Just over a year later, Elliott, who had entered the draft early following his junior season, was brought back to AT&T Stadium when the Dallas Cowboys selected him with the 4th overall pick.

This was the Buckeyes first national championship since 2002 and their 8th in school history. Ohio State lost the turnover battle in this game 4–1, the 4 turnovers being the most ever by a winning team in the national title game, but outgained Oregon in total yards 538–465. The Buckeyes entered 2015 looking to repeat as national champions with the return of Cardale Jones and several other players. However, Jones underperformed and was eventually demoted to be the backup quarterback to JT Barrett. The Buckeyes lost at home to Michigan State in week 13 17–14, ending their chance at a repeat. They were invited to the Fiesta Bowl against Notre Dame, which they won 44–28. The Buckeyes then returned to the playoff in 2016, despite not winning their conference, but lost in the Fiesta Bowl to eventual national champion Clemson 31–0. Head coach Urban Meyer completed two more successful seasons as the head of the Buckeye program, winning the Big Ten conference title in both the 2017 and 2018 seasons. Coincidentally, the Buckeyes would defeat the Pac-12 champion – the USC Trojans and Washington Huskies, respectively – following each season. Meyer retired following the 2018 season and was replaced by offensive coordinator Ryan Day. Coach Day would lead the Buckeyes back to the playoff in 2019, losing in the semifinal to Clemson, and in 2020, where they would lose to Alabama in the national championship.

Meanwhile, the Ducks fell to 0–2 in national championship games, with their other loss to Auburn in 2010. They also fell to 0-9 all time against Ohio State. Marcus Mariota, who won the Heisman Trophy in 2014, declared for the NFL draft after the season. In 2015, without Mariota, the Ducks offense was depleted, as the team lost momentum going forward. The next season, the Ducks finished 9–4, which included a close loss to Michigan State in East Lansing (31-28). However, a home blowout loss to Utah (62-20) and a double overtime loss at home to Washington State (45-38) cost the Ducks a chance at getting into the playoffs. They ended the 2015 season with a triple overtime loss to TCU in the Alamo Bowl 47-41 despite having a 31–0 lead at halftime. The 31-point blown lead remains the largest blown lead in school history and ties the largest blown lead in a college football bowl game. In 2016, Oregon regressed even further, finishing 4-8 and failing to reach a bowl for the first time since 2004, and Helfrich was fired. In 2017, under new coach Willie Taggart, the Ducks improved and qualified for a bowl with a 7–5 record. Taggart leveraged the modest but short-lived rebuild into the head coaching position at Florida State University and left the Ducks before their bowl game, becoming the shortest-tenured Ducks coach since the 1940s. The school then promoted offensive coordinator Mario Cristobal to head coach prior to the 2017 Las Vegas Bowl, which the Ducks lost to Boise State 38–28. Cristobal continued to rebuild the Ducks program, culminating in a conference championship and Rose Bowl victory after the 2019 season. In the pandemic-shortened 2020 season, the Ducks repeated as conference champions, despite a runner up finish their division, and qualified for the 2021 Fiesta Bowl.

Oregon's appearance as the Pac-12 representative in the 2014 playoff was followed by the Washington Huskies in 2016. Washington lost in the Peach Bowl to Alabama 24-7, and the Pac-12 would not return to the playoffs until 2023. The Pac-12's three playoff appearances are the fewest out of all the Power 5 conferences.

Long after the game, both teams were scheduled to meet in a home and home series in 2020 and 2021, with the 2020 game occurring in Oregon's Autzen Stadium and the 2021 game occurring in Ohio State's Ohio Stadium. However, the first game was canceled on July 9, 2020, in response to the COVID-19 pandemic. The 2021 match-up ended up with Oregon beating Ohio State for the first time ever, 35–28, then-head coaches Ryan Day and Mario Cristobal were the sixth different pair of coaches to meet in the Buckeyes/Ducks series, the two programs also became conference foes in 2024 when Oregon joined the Big Ten Conference on August 2, with their first conference meeting taking place that same year in Eugene, with Oregon once again winning, 32-31. In a rematch and similar instance to the 2014 season, the Buckeyes and Ducks met again in the College Football Playoff, this time in the first 12-team format, in the Rose Bowl, which was slated as one of the quarterfinal games. The game featured the 8th-seeded Buckeyes against the top-seeded and undefeated Ducks, who had won the Big Ten that season. Ohio State wound up routing the Ducks 41-21, on their way to winning their 9th national championship and becoming the first champion of the 12-team playoff.

== See also ==
- Super Bowl XLV, the NFL championship game contested at the same venue on February 6, 2011 (then called Cowboys Stadium)
- College football national championships in NCAA Division I FBS
