= College Football Playoff National Championship Trophy =

American football trophy

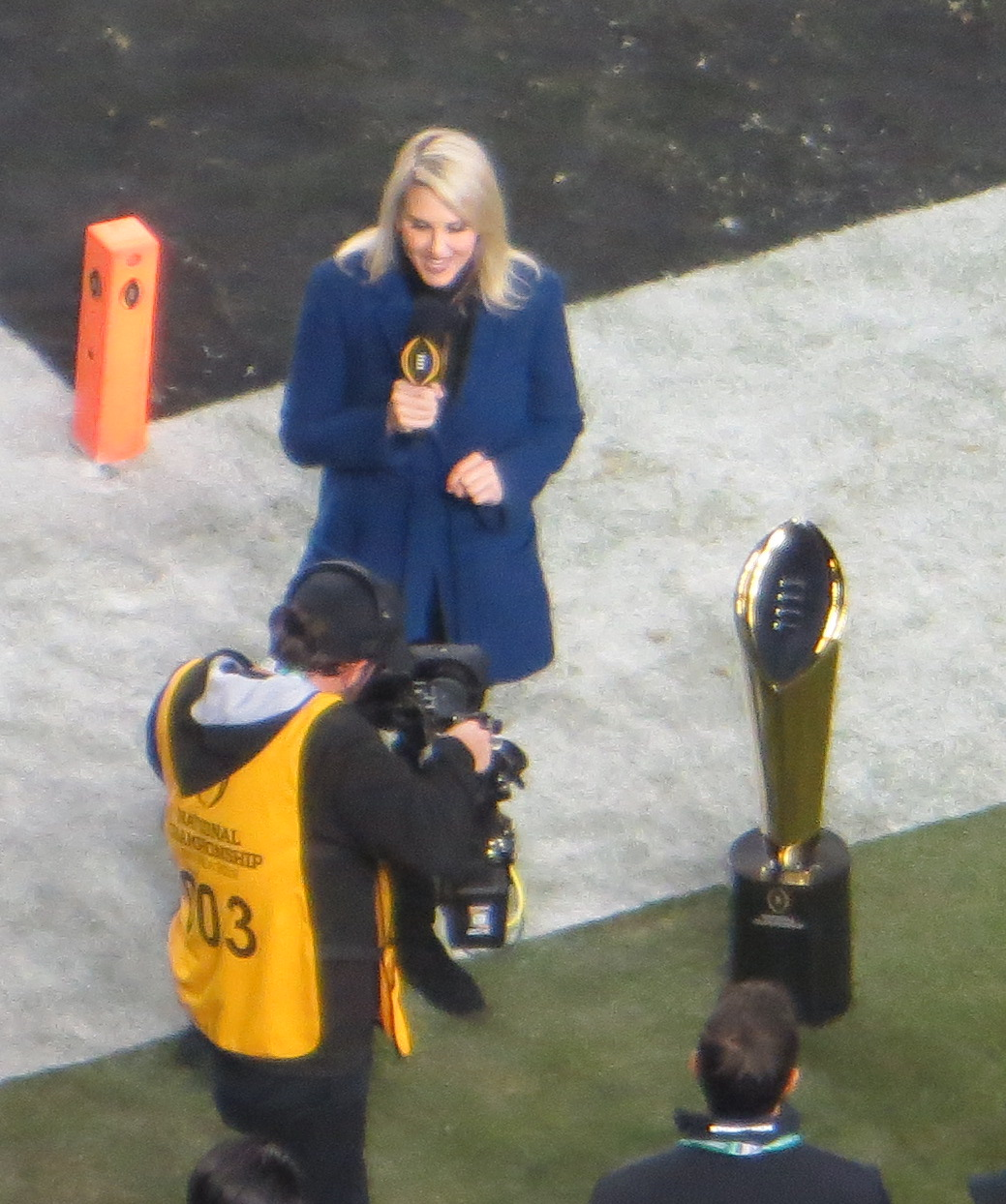
- The trophy at the 2019 College Football Playoff National Championship
- Awarded for: Winner of the College Football Playoff National Championship
- Country: United States
- Presented by: College Football Playoff

History
- First award: 2014
- Most recent: Indiana
- Website: collegefootballplayoff.com

The College Football Playoff National Championship Trophy is the trophy awarded to the winner of the College Football Playoff (CFP), the postseason tournament in American college football that determines a national champion for the NCAA Division I Football Bowl Subdivision (FBS). It is currently held by the Indiana Hoosiers, who won the 2026 College Football Playoff National Championship to cap the 2025 season.

== Design ==
The 26.5-inch-tall (67 cm), 35-pound (16 kg) trophy is oblong-shaped like a football at the base, tapering up to a flattened full-size football at the top. It is made of 24-karat gold, bronze and stainless steel, with the bulk of the trophy gold-colored and the football at the top a gray metallic color. The football's four laces represent the four playoff teams of the CFP's original four-team format used from 2014 to 2023, although the tournament was expanded to include 12 teams starting in 2024.

The trophy is separate from its 12-inch-tall bronze base, so it can be hoisted. The base is finished in black patina and weighs 30 pounds (13.61 kg). Dr Pepper sponsors the trophy. The company originally came to an agreement with ESPN in 2014 to pay $35 million per year for sponsorship rights through the 2020 season; the two companies agreed to a contract extension in 2018 (the financial details of which have not been disclosed), allowing Dr Pepper to retain sponsorship rights through the 2026 College Football Playoff. The trophy was unveiled on July 14, 2014.

The trophy was designed by design firm Pentagram and crafted by the Polich Tallix fine art foundry of Rock Tavern, New York.

College Football Playoff officials commissioned the trophy for the new playoff system, preferring a new award that was unconnected with the previous Bowl Championship Series (BCS) postseason system which was sometimes controversial. Winners of the BCS National Championship Game were awarded the AFCA "crystal football" trophy through the 2013 season.

== Winners ==
Season	Winner	Championship game	Game location
2014	Ohio State	Ohio State 42, Oregon 20	AT&T Stadium, Arlington, Texas
2015	Alabama	Alabama 45, Clemson 40	University of Phoenix Stadium, Glendale, Arizona
2016	Clemson	Clemson 35, Alabama 31	Raymond James Stadium, Tampa, Florida
2017	Alabama	Alabama 26, Georgia 23 (OT)	Mercedes-Benz Stadium, Atlanta, Georgia
2018	Clemson	Clemson 44, Alabama 16	Levi's Stadium, Santa Clara, California
2019	LSU	LSU 42, Clemson 25	Mercedes-Benz Superdome, New Orleans, Louisiana
2020	Alabama	Alabama 52, Ohio State 24	Hard Rock Stadium, Miami Gardens, Florida
2021	Georgia	Georgia 33, Alabama 18	Lucas Oil Stadium, Indianapolis, Indiana
2022	Georgia	Georgia 65, TCU 7	SoFi Stadium, Inglewood, California
2023	Michigan	Michigan 34, Washington 13	NRG Stadium, Houston, Texas
2024	Ohio State	Ohio State 34, Notre Dame 23	Mercedes-Benz Stadium, Atlanta, Georgia
2025	Indiana	Indiana 27, Miami 21	Hard Rock Stadium, Miami Gardens, Florida

=== By team ===
Team	Number	Season(s)
Alabama	3	2015, 2017, 2020
Clemson	2	2016, 2018
Georgia	2	2021, 2022
Ohio State	2	2014, 2024
Indiana	1	2025
LSU	1	2019
Michigan	1	2023
