= 2015 NCAA football bowl games =

In college football, 2015 NCAA football bowl games may refer to:

- 2014–15 NCAA football bowl games, for games played in January 2015 as part of the 2014 season
- 2015–16 NCAA football bowl games, for games played in December 2015 as part of the 2015 season
