= Thomas Tyner =

American football player (born 1994)

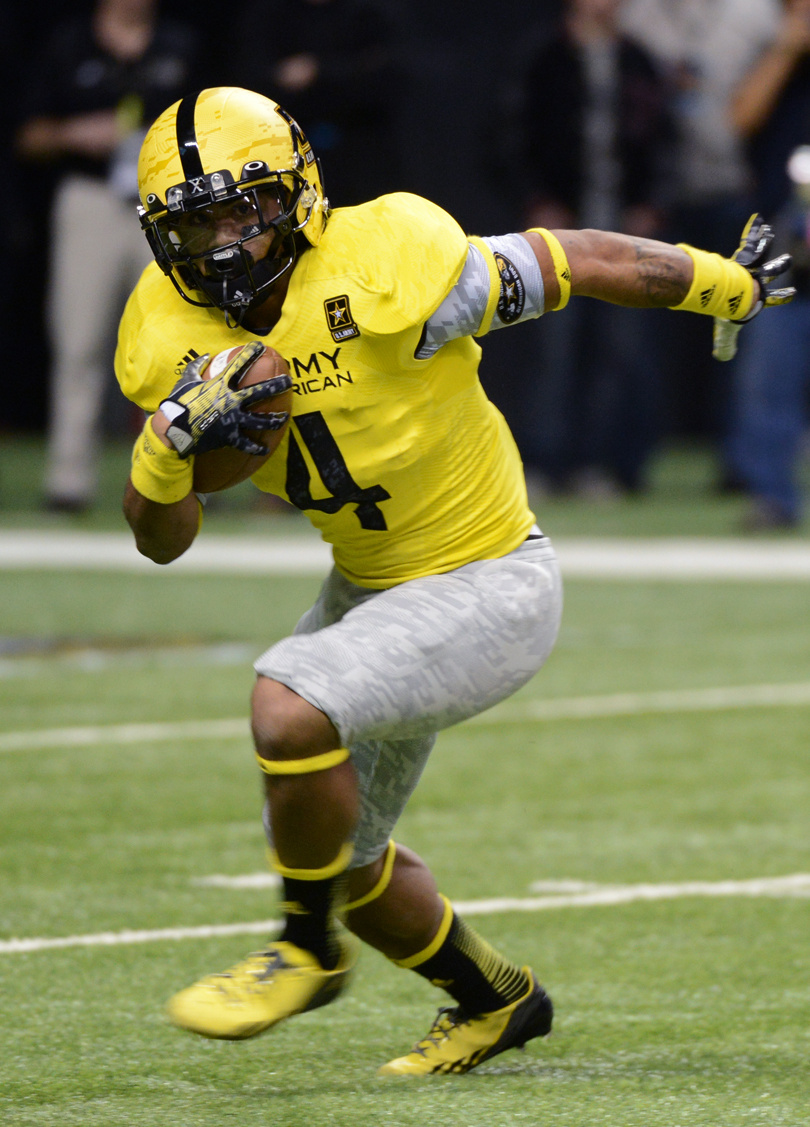
- Thomas Tyner in 2013

No. 24
- Position: Running back

Personal information
- Born: September 14, 1994 (age 32); Aloha, Oregon, U.S.
- Listed height: 5 ft 11 in (1.80 m)
- Listed weight: 215 lb (98 kg)

Career information
- High school: Aloha (OR)
- College: Oregon (2013–2014); Oregon State (2017)

Awards and highlights
- Rose Bowl champion (2015); Pac-12 champion (2014)
- Stats at ESPN

Thomas Tyner (born September 14, 1994) is an American former college football running back. He played for the Oregon Ducks from 2013 to 2014, and for the Oregon State Beavers in 2017. He did not play during the 2015 and 2016 seasons due to a shoulder injury.

== Early life ==
His parents are John Tyner and Donna Tyner, Donna currently being on the Beaverton School District School Board since 2013. He has a brother, Michael, who is two years older than him and attended Pacific University. Tyner grew up in the Tyler's Green neighborhood in Aloha, Oregon. Tyner attended Hazeldale Elementary School, Mountain View Middle School, and Aloha High School. He played football as a running back and ran track. Tyner was a first-team Parade and USA Today All-American. As a sophomore, he rushed for 1,821 yards and 19 touchdowns, becoming Oregon's first sophomore to earn the state's largest division player-of-the-year accolades. As a junior, he rushed for 1,136 yards, despite missing six games. In his senior year, he broke a six-year-old state record for single-season rushing with 3,415 yards. He had 643 yards rushing with 10 touchdowns and caught six passes for 106 yards and two touchdowns in an 84–63 win over Lakeridge High School.

Regarded as a five-star recruit by Rivals.com, he was ranked 12th among all players by Scout.com and the nation's No. 2 running back behind only Derrick Green. He also participated in the 2013 U.S. Army All-American Bowl, leading the West Team in rushing with 14 yards on just four carries.

=== Track and field ===
Tyner was also an accomplished track & field athlete at Aloha High School. He established the 100-meter dash state record of 10.43 seconds as a high school sophomore. At the 2011 Aloha vs Lincoln Meet, he won both the 100-meters (10.38s) and 200 meters, recording a personal-best time of 21.41 seconds. He ran a career-best time of 10.35 seconds in the 100 meters at the 2011 Metro League Championships, placing first.

== College career ==
Tyner was one of the most highly recruited players in the Class of 2013. He chose to attend the University of Oregon and play for the Oregon Ducks football team. In 2013, Tyner was named to the first-team true freshman All-America team by 247Sports.com. In 2014, he was a member of Oregon's team that played in the 2015 College Football Playoff National Championship game, losing to Ohio State.

On August 9, 2015, several news sources reported that Tyner would not play during the 2015 season following necessary shoulder surgery; he had injured his shoulder in 2014 playing against the Washington Huskies. On February 5, 2016, Oregon announced that Tyner had decided to medically retire from football. Tyner's father, John, revealed that the left shoulder injury Tyner suffered in 2014 was healed, but his other shoulder still had a torn labrum.

After not playing college football during 2015 and 2016, on May 20, 2017, Tyner announced that he intended to return and would play for in-state rival Oregon State. Tyner played for the Beavers during 2017 as a senior transfer, appearing in 10 of their games. In January 2018, Tyner said it was "time for me to move on", and that he would not petition the NCAA for another season of eligibility.

=== Statistics ===
			Rushing							Receiving				
Season	Team	W–L	Att	Yards	YPC	YPG	Long	TD	100+ G	Rec	Yards	Avg	Long	TD
2013	Oregon	11–2	115	711	6.2	59.2	66	9	1	14	134	9.6	23	0
2014	Oregon	13–2	113	573	5.1	52	23	5	1	11	67	6.1	21	1
2017	Oregon State	1–11	64	297	4.6			3		5	42	8.4		0

== Awards & honors ==
=== College ===
- Rose Bowl Champion (2015)
- Pac-12 Champion (2014)
- 247Sports.com First-Team Freshman All-American (2013)

=== High school ===
- Oregon 6A State Champion (2010)
- U.S. Army All-American (2013)
- USA Today First Team All-American (2012)
- Parade All-First Team (2012)
- OSAA single-season rushing leader: 3,415 yards (2012)
