= 2015 Citrus Bowl =

American college football game

2015 Buffalo Wild Wings Citrus Bowl
- 69th Citrus Bowl
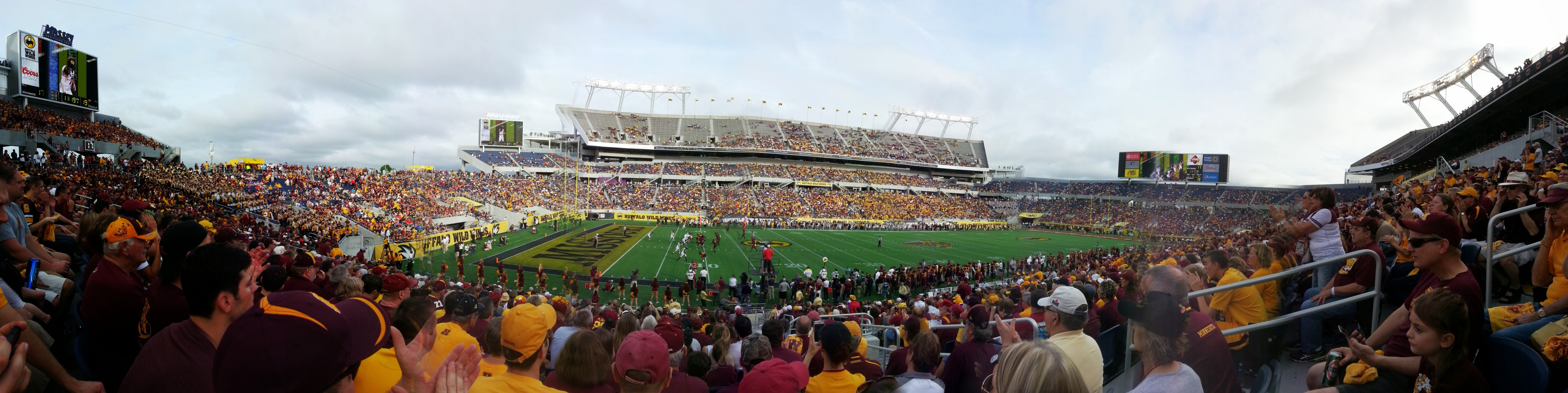
Missouri Tigers	Minnesota Golden Gophers
(10–3)	(8–4)
SEC	Big Ten
33	17
Head coach: Gary Pinkel	Head coach: Jerry Kill
AP / Coaches / CFP; 16 / 14 / 16	AP / Coaches / CFP; NR / NR / 25
	1	2	3	4	Total
Missouri	0	10	9	14	33
Minnesota	7	0	10	0	17
- Date: January 1, 2015
- Season: 2014
- Stadium: Orlando Citrus Bowl
- Location: Orlando, Florida
- MVP: Missouri DE Markus Golden
- Favorite: Missouri by 5
- Referee: Alan Eck (Big XII)
- Attendance: 48,624

United States TV coverage
- Network: ABC
- Announcers: Mike Patrick (play-by-play); Ed Cunningham (color); Jeannine Edwards (sidelines)

The 2015 Citrus Bowl was an American college football bowl game played on January 1, 2015 at the Orlando Citrus Bowl in Orlando, Florida. The 69th edition was one of the 2014–15 NCAA football bowl games that conclude the 2014 NCAA Division I FBS football season. The game started at approximately 1:00 p.m. EST and was televised by ABC. It was sponsored by the Buffalo Wild Wings restaurant franchise and is officially known at the Buffalo Wild Wings Citrus Bowl.

== Teams ==
The Minnesota Golden Gophers represented the Big Ten Conference, and the Missouri Tigers represented the Southeastern Conference.

This was Missouri's second appearance in the game and first as a member of the SEC; the Tigers defeated Southern Miss, 19–17, in 1981, while representing the Big Eight Conference. This was Minnesota's first appearance in the game.

== Game summary ==
=== Scoring summary ===
Scoring summary

Quarter	Time	Drive			Team	Scoring information	Score	
Quarter	Time	Plays	Yards	TOP	Team	Scoring information	MIZZ	MINN
1	5:42	11	80	5:56	MINN	Rodrick Williams, Jr. 20-yard touchdown run, Ryan Santoso kick good	0	7
2	6:39	8	45	2:56	MIZZ	21-yard field goal by Andrew Baggett	3	7
2	1:04	5	67	1:55	MIZZ	Bud Sasser 25-yard touchdown reception from Maty Mauk, Andrew Baggett kick good	10	7
3	13:03	5	32	1:57	MIZZ	33-yard field goal by Andrew Baggett	13	7
3	11:48	3	75	1:15	MINN	Maxx Williams 54-yard touchdown reception from Mitch Leidner, Ryan Santoso kick good	13	14
3	9:16	3	34	1:22	MIZZ	Maty Mauk 18-yard touchdown run, 2-point pass intercepted	19	14
3	7:22	5	22	1:54	MINN	38-yard field goal by Ryan Santoso	19	17
4	9:22	5	90	2:26	MIZZ	Russell Hansbrough 78-yard touchdown run, Andrew Baggett kick good	26	17
4	4:51	4	80	2:00	MIZZ	Bud Sasser 7-yard touchdown reception from Maty Mauk, Andrew Baggett kick good	33	17
"TOP" = time of possession. For other American football terms, see Glossary of American football.							33	17

=== Statistics ===
Statistics	MIZZ	MINN
First downs	18	19
Plays–yards	64–434	66–373
Rushes–yards	45–337	33–106
Passing yards	97	267
Passing: Comp–Att–Int	12–19–2	22–33–0
Time of possession	30:05	29:55
