= Tony Washington (linebacker) =

American football player (born 1992)

Kentucky Wildcats
- Title: Defensive edge/outside linebackers coach

Personal information
- Born: June 1, 1992 (age 34); West Los Angeles, California, U.S.
- Listed height: 6 ft 4 in (1.93 m)
- Listed weight: 247 lb (112 kg)

Career information
- High school: Los Osos (Rancho Cucamonga, California)
- College: Oregon (2010–2014)
- NFL draft: 2015: undrafted

Career history

Playing
- Houston Texans (2015–2016); Tennessee Titans (2017–2018)*
- * Offseason or practice squad member only

Coaching
- Nebraska (2019–2020) Graduate assistant; Oregon (2021) Director of player development; Oregon (2022) Assistant defensive line coach; Oregon (2023) Outside linebackers coach; UCLA (2024) Defensive line & outside linebackers coach; Ohio State (2025) Assistant defensive line coach; Kentucky (2026–present) Defensive ends & outside linebackers coach

Awards and highlights
- 2× Rose Bowl champion (2012, 2015); Fiesta Bowl champion (2013)
- Stats at Pro Football Reference

Tony Washington Jr. (born June 1, 1992) is an American former professional football player who was a linebacker in the National Football League (NFL). He was signed by the Houston Texans as an undrafted free agent in 2015. He played college football for the Oregon Ducks. He is currently a coach for Defensive edge and outside linebacker coach for the Kentucky Wildcats.

== Professional career ==
=== Houston Texans ===
After going undrafted in the 2015 NFL draft, Washington signed with the Houston Texans. He was placed on injured reserve on September 5, 2015, but was waived with an injury settlement on September 11, 2015. He was re-signed to the practice squad on December 9, 2015. He signed a reserve/future contract with the Texans on January 11, 2016.

On September 3, 2016, he was waived/injured by the Texans and placed on injured reserve.

On September 2, 2017, Washington was waived by the Texans.

=== Tennessee Titans ===
On September 20, 2017, Washington was signed to the Tennessee Titans' practice squad. He was released on October 5, 2017.

On August 12, 2018, Washington re-signed with the Titans. He was waived on September 1, 2018.

== Coaching career ==
In 2019, Washington took an assistant football coaching position at the University of Nebraska.
