= 2014–15 NCAA football bowl games =

- Season: 2014
- Regular season: August 30, 2014 – December 13, 2014
- Number of bowls: 39
- All-star games: 3
- Bowl games: December 20, 2014 – January 12, 2015
- National Championship: 2015 College Football Playoffs; National Championship
- Location of Championship: AT&T Stadium; Arlington, Texas
- Champions: Ohio State Buckeyes
- Bowl Challenge Cup winner: Conference USA
Bowl record by conference
Conference	Bowls	Record	Number of teams in final AP poll
SEC	12	7–5 (0.583)	6
Big Ten	11	6–5 (0.545)	3
ACC	11	4–7 (0.364)	4
Pac-12	9	6–3 (0.667)	6
Mountain West	7	3–4 (0.429)	1
Big 12	7	2–5 (0.286)	3
Conference USA	5	4–1 (0.800)	1
American	5	2–3 (0.400)	1
MAC	5	2–3 (0.400)	0
Independents	3	2–1 (0.667)	0
Sun Belt	3	1–2 (0.333)	0

The 2014–15 NCAA football bowl games were a series of college football bowl games. They completed the 2014 NCAA Division I FBS football season, and included 39 team-competitive games and four all-star games. The games began on December 20, 2014 and, aside from the all-star games, ended with the 2015 College Football Playoff National Championship which was played on January 12, 2015.

A new record total of 39 team-competitive bowl games were played, including the national championship game and the inaugural Miami Beach Bowl, Camellia Bowl, Boca Raton Bowl and Bahamas Bowl. While bowl games had been the purview of only the very best teams for nearly a century, this was the ninth consecutive year that teams with non-winning seasons participated in bowl games. To fill the 76 available team-competitive bowl slots, a total of 13 teams (17% of all participants) with non-winning seasons participated in bowl games—12 with a .500 (6-6) season and, for the third time in four years, a team with a sub-.500 (6-7) season.

== Schedule ==
The schedule for the 2014–15 bowl games is below. All times are EST (UTC−5). The rankings used are the CFP rankings.

=== Playoff ===
The 2014–15 postseason was the first to feature a College Football Playoff (CFP) to determine a national champion of Division I FBS college football. Four teams were selected by a 13-member committee to participate in a single-elimination tournament, whose semifinals were held at the Rose Bowl and the Sugar Bowl as part of a yearly rotation of six bowls. Their winners advanced to the 2015 College Football Playoff National Championship at AT&T Stadium in Arlington, Texas.

Semifinals
January 1 – Sugar Bowl; Mercedes-Benz Superdome, New Orleans
1	Alabama	35
4	Ohio State	42
January 1 – Rose Bowl; Rose Bowl Stadium, Pasadena
2	Oregon	59
3	Florida State	20

Championship
January 12 – National Championship; AT&T Stadium, Arlington
4	Ohio State	42
2	Oregon	20

=== CFP bowl games and Championship Game ===
Starting with the 2014–15 postseason, six College Football Playoff (CFP) bowl games will host two semifinal playoff games on a rotating basis—the Rose Bowl, Sugar Bowl, Orange Bowl, Cotton Bowl, Peach Bowl, and Fiesta Bowl. The games will be played on two days, on or around January 1. The winners of the two semifinal games will advance to the College Football Playoff National Championship. These six bowl games are also known as the New Year's Six. All games will be televised by ESPN and broadcast on the radio by ESPN Radio.

Date	Game	Site	Teams	Affiliations	Results
Dec. 31	Peach Bowl	Georgia Dome; Atlanta, GA; 12:30 pm	No. 6 TCU Horned Frogs (11–1); No. 9 Ole Miss Rebels (9–3)	Big 12; SEC	TCU 42; Ole Miss 3
Dec. 31	Fiesta Bowl	University of Phoenix Stadium; Glendale, AZ; 4:00 pm	No. 20 Boise State Broncos (11–2); No. 10 Arizona Wildcats (10–3)	Mountain West; Pac-12	Boise State 38; Arizona 30
Dec. 31	Orange Bowl	Sun Life Stadium; Miami Gardens, FL; 7:30 pm	No. 12 Georgia Tech Yellow Jackets (10–3); No. 7 Mississippi State Bulldogs (10–2)	ACC; SEC	Georgia Tech 49; Mississippi State 34
Jan. 1	Cotton Bowl Classic	AT&T Stadium; Arlington, TX; 1:00 pm	No. 8 Michigan State Spartans (10–2); No. 5 Baylor Bears (11–1)	Big Ten; Big 12	Michigan State 42; Baylor 41
Jan. 1	Rose Bowl (Playoff Semifinal Game)	Rose Bowl; Pasadena, CA; 5:00 pm	No. 2 Oregon Ducks (12–1); No. 3 Florida State Seminoles (13–0)	Pac-12; ACC	Oregon 59; Florida State 20
Jan. 1	Sugar Bowl (Playoff Semifinal Game)	Mercedes-Benz Superdome; New Orleans, LA; 8:30 pm	No. 4 Ohio State Buckeyes (12–1); No. 1 Alabama Crimson Tide (12–1)	Big Ten; SEC	Ohio State 42; Alabama 35
Jan. 12	College Football Playoff National Championship (Rose Bowl Winner vs. Sugar Bowl Winner)	AT&T Stadium; Arlington, TX; 8:30 pm	No. 4 Ohio State Buckeyes (13–1); No. 2 Oregon Ducks (13–1)	Big Ten; Pac-12	Ohio State 42; Oregon 20

=== Non-CFP bowl games ===
For the 2014–15 postseason, four new bowl games were added — the Camellia Bowl, Miami Beach Bowl, Boca Raton Bowl, and Bahamas Bowl — bringing the total number of bowl games to 39. Additionally, the Little Caesars Pizza Bowl was replaced by the Quick Lane Bowl.

Date	Game	Site	Television	Teams	Affiliations	Results
Dec. 20	New Orleans Bowl	Mercedes-Benz Superdome; New Orleans, LA; 11:00 am	ESPN	Louisiana–Lafayette Ragin' Cajuns (8–4); Nevada Wolf Pack (7–5)	Sun Belt; Mountain West	Louisiana–Lafayette 16; Nevada 3
Dec. 20	New Mexico Bowl	University Stadium; Albuquerque, NM; 2:20 pm	ESPN	Utah State Aggies (9–4); UTEP Miners (7–5)	Mountain West; C-USA	Utah State 21; UTEP 6
Dec. 20	Las Vegas Bowl	Sam Boyd Stadium; Whitney, NV; 3:30 pm	ABC	No. 22 Utah Utes (8–4); Colorado State Rams (10–2)	Pac-12; Mountain West	Utah 45; Colorado State 10
Dec. 20	Famous Idaho Potato Bowl	Albertsons Stadium; Boise, ID; 5:45 pm	ESPN	Air Force Falcons (9–3); Western Michigan Broncos (8–4)	Mountain West; MAC	Air Force 38; Western Michigan 24
Dec. 20	Camellia Bowl	Cramton Bowl; Montgomery, AL; 9:15 pm	ESPN	Bowling Green Falcons (7–6); South Alabama Jaguars (6–6)	MAC; Sun Belt	Bowling Green 33; South Alabama 28
Dec. 22	Miami Beach Bowl	Marlins Park; Miami, Florida; 2:00 pm	ESPN	Memphis Tigers (9–3); BYU Cougars (8–4)	American; Independent	Memphis 55; BYU 48 (2OT)
Dec. 23	Boca Raton Bowl	FAU Stadium; Boca Raton, Florida; 6:00 pm	ESPN	Marshall Thundering Herd (12–1); Northern Illinois Huskies (11–2)	C-USA; MAC	Marshall 52; Northern Illinois 23
Dec. 23	Poinsettia Bowl	Qualcomm Stadium; San Diego, California; 9:30 pm	ESPN	Navy Midshipmen (7–5); San Diego State Aztecs (7–5)	Independent; Mountain West	Navy 17; San Diego State 16
Dec. 24	Bahamas Bowl	Thomas Robinson Stadium; Nassau, Bahamas; 12:00 pm	ESPN	Western Kentucky Hilltoppers (7–5); Central Michigan Chippewas (7–5)	C-USA; MAC	Western Kentucky 49; Central Michigan 48
Dec. 24	Hawaii Bowl	Aloha Stadium; Honolulu, HI; 8:00 pm	ESPN	Rice Owls (7–5); Fresno State Bulldogs (6–7)	C-USA; Mountain West	Rice 30; Fresno State 6
Dec. 26	Heart of Dallas Bowl	Cotton Bowl; Dallas, TX; 1:00 pm	ESPN	Louisiana Tech Bulldogs (8–5); Illinois Fighting Illini (6–6)	C-USA; Big Ten	Louisiana Tech 35; Illinois 18
Dec. 26	Quick Lane Bowl	Ford Field; Detroit, MI; 4:30 pm	ESPN	Rutgers Scarlet Knights (7–5); North Carolina Tar Heels (6–6)	Big Ten; ACC	Rutgers 40; North Carolina 21
Dec. 26	St. Petersburg Bowl	Tropicana Field; St. Petersburg, FL; 8:00 pm	ESPN	NC State Wolfpack (7–5); UCF Knights (9–3)	ACC; American	NC State 34; UCF 27
Dec. 27	Military Bowl	Navy–Marine Corps Memorial Stadium; Annapolis, MD; 1:00 pm	ESPN	Virginia Tech Hokies (6–6); Cincinnati Bearcats (9–3)	ACC; American	Virginia Tech 33; Cincinnati 17
Dec. 27	Sun Bowl	Sun Bowl Stadium; El Paso, TX; 2:00 pm	CBS	No. 15 Arizona State Sun Devils (9–3); Duke Blue Devils (9–3)	Pac-12; ACC	Arizona State 36; Duke 31
Dec. 27	Independence Bowl	Independence Stadium; Shreveport, LA; 4:00 pm	ABC	South Carolina Gamecocks (6–6); Miami Hurricanes (6–6)	SEC; ACC	South Carolina 24; Miami 21
Dec. 27	Pinstripe Bowl	Yankee Stadium; Bronx, NY; 4:30 pm	ESPN	Penn State Nittany Lions (6–6); Boston College Eagles (7–5)	Big Ten; ACC	Penn State 31; Boston College 30 (OT)
Dec. 27	Holiday Bowl	Qualcomm Stadium; San Diego, California; 8:00 pm	ESPN	No. 24 USC Trojans (8–4); Nebraska Cornhuskers (9–3)	Pac-12; Big Ten	USC 45; Nebraska 42
Dec. 29	Liberty Bowl	Liberty Bowl Memorial Stadium; Memphis, TN; 2:00 pm	ESPN	Texas A&M Aggies (7–5); West Virginia Mountaineers (7–5)	SEC; Big 12	Texas A&M 45; West Virginia 37
Dec. 29	Russell Athletic Bowl	Orlando Citrus Bowl Stadium; Orlando, FL; 5:30 pm	ESPN	No. 17 Clemson Tigers (9–3); Oklahoma Sooners (8–4)	ACC; Big 12	Clemson 40; Oklahoma 6
Dec. 29	Texas Bowl	NRG Stadium; Houston, TX; 9:00 pm	ESPN	Arkansas Razorbacks (6–6); Texas Longhorns (6–6)	SEC; Big 12	Arkansas 31; Texas 7
Dec. 30	Music City Bowl	LP Field; Nashville, TN; 3:00 pm	ESPN	Notre Dame Fighting Irish (7–5); No. 23 LSU Tigers (8–4)	Independent; SEC	Notre Dame 31; LSU 28
Dec. 30	Belk Bowl	Bank of America Stadium; Charlotte, NC; 6:45 pm	ESPN	No. 13 Georgia Bulldogs (9–3); No. 21 Louisville Cardinals (9–3)	SEC; ACC	Georgia 37; Louisville 14
Dec. 30	Foster Farms Bowl	Levi's Stadium; Santa Clara, CA; 10:00 pm	ESPN	Stanford Cardinal (7–5); Maryland Terrapins (7–5)	Pac-12; Big Ten	Stanford 45; Maryland 21
Jan. 1	Outback Bowl	Raymond James Stadium; Tampa, FL; 12:00 pm	ESPN2	No. 18 Wisconsin Badgers (10–3); No. 19 Auburn Tigers (8–4)	Big Ten; SEC	Wisconsin 34; Auburn 31 (OT)
Jan. 1	Citrus Bowl	Orlando Citrus Bowl Stadium; Orlando, FL; 1:00 pm	ABC	No. 16 Missouri Tigers (10–3); No. 25 Minnesota Golden Gophers (8–4)	SEC; Big Ten	Missouri 33; Minnesota 17
Jan. 2	Armed Forces Bowl	Amon G. Carter Stadium; Fort Worth, TX; 12:00 pm	ESPN	Houston Cougars (7–5); Pittsburgh Panthers (6–6)	American; ACC	Houston 35; Pittsburgh 34
Jan. 2	TaxSlayer Bowl	EverBank Field; Jacksonville, FL; 3:20 pm	ESPN	Tennessee Volunteers (6–6); Iowa Hawkeyes (7–5)	SEC; Big Ten	Tennessee 45; Iowa 28
Jan. 2	Alamo Bowl	Alamodome; San Antonio, TX; 6:45 pm	ESPN	No. 14 UCLA Bruins (9–3); No. 11 Kansas State Wildcats (9–3)	Pac-12; Big 12	UCLA 40; Kansas State 35
Jan. 2	Cactus Bowl	Sun Devil Stadium; Tempe, AZ; 10:15 pm	ESPN	Oklahoma State Cowboys (6–6); Washington Huskies (8–5)	Big 12; Pac-12	Oklahoma State 30; Washington 22
Jan. 3	Birmingham Bowl	Legion Field; Birmingham, AL; 12:00 pm	ESPN	Florida Gators (6–5); East Carolina Pirates (8–4)	SEC; American	Florida 28; East Carolina 20
Jan. 4	GoDaddy Bowl	Ladd–Peebles Stadium; Mobile, AL; 9:00 pm	ESPN	Toledo Rockets (8–4); Arkansas State Red Wolves (7–5)	MAC; Sun Belt	Toledo 63; Arkansas State 44

=== Post College Football Playoff all-star games ===
Date	Game	Site	Television	Participants	Results
Jan. 10	Medal of Honor Bowl	Johnson Hagood Stadium; Charleston, SC; 2:30 pm	NBCSN	National Team vs. American Team	National 26; American 14
Jan. 17	East–West Shrine Game	Tropicana Field; St. Petersburg, FL; 4:00 pm	NFL Network	East Team vs. West Team	East 19; West 3
Jan. 17	NFLPA Collegiate Bowl	StubHub Center; Carson, CA; 6:00 pm	ESPN2	National Team vs. American Team	National 17; American 0
Jan. 24	Senior Bowl	Ladd–Peebles Stadium; Mobile, AL; 4:00 pm	NFL Network	North Team vs. South Team	North 34; South 13

== Selection of the teams ==
=== CFP top 25 teams ===
On December 7, 2014, the 13-member College Football Playoff selection committee announced their final team rankings for the year.

Rank	Team	W–L	Conference and standing	Bowl game
1	Alabama Crimson Tide	12–1	SEC champions	Sugar Bowl (CFP semifinal)
2	Oregon Ducks	12–1	Pac-12 champions	Rose Bowl (CFP semifinal)
3	Florida State Seminoles	13–0	ACC champions	Rose Bowl (CFP semifinal)
4	Ohio State Buckeyes	12–1	Big Ten champions	Sugar Bowl (CFP semifinal)
5	Baylor Bears	11–1	Big 12 co-champions	Cotton Bowl Classic (NY6)
6	TCU Horned Frogs	11–1	Big 12 co-champions	Peach Bowl (NY6)
7	Mississippi State Bulldogs	10–2	SEC Western Division second place	Orange Bowl (NY6)
8	Michigan State Spartans	10–2	Big Ten East Division second place	Cotton Bowl Classic (NY6)
9	Ole Miss Rebels	9–3	SEC Western Division third place	Peach Bowl (NY6)
10	Arizona Wildcats	10–3	Pac-12 South Division champions	Fiesta Bowl (NY6)
11	Kansas State Wildcats	9–3	Big 12 third place	Alamo Bowl
12	Georgia Tech Yellow Jackets	10–3	ACC Coastal Division champions	Orange Bowl (NY6)
13	Georgia Bulldogs	9–3	SEC Eastern Division second place	Belk Bowl
14	UCLA Bruins	9–3	Pac-12 South Division second place (tie)	Alamo Bowl
15	Arizona State Sun Devils	9–3	Pac-12 South Division second place (tie)	Sun Bowl
16	Missouri Tigers	10–3	SEC Eastern Division champions	Citrus Bowl
17	Clemson Tigers	9–3	ACC Atlantic Division second place	Russell Athletic Bowl
18	Wisconsin Badgers	10–3	Big Ten West Division champions	Outback Bowl
19	Auburn Tigers	8–4	SEC Western Division fourth place (tie)	Outback Bowl
20	Boise State Broncos	11–2	Mountain West champions	Fiesta Bowl (NY6)
21	Louisville Cardinals	9–3	ACC Atlantic Division third place	Belk Bowl
22	Utah Utes	8–4	Pac-12 South Division fifth place	Las Vegas Bowl
23	LSU Tigers	8–4	SEC Western Division fourth place (tie)	Music City Bowl
24	USC Trojans	8–4	Pac-12 South Division second place (tie)	Holiday Bowl
25	Minnesota Golden Gophers	8–4	Big Ten West Division second place (tie)	Citrus Bowl

=== Conference champions' bowl games ===
Three bowls featured two conference champions playing against each other—the Boca Raton Bowl, Rose Bowl, and Sugar Bowl. Rankings are per the above CFP standings.

Conference	Champion	W–L	Rank	Bowl game
ACC	Florida State Seminoles	13–0	3	Rose Bowl
American†	Cincinnati Bearcats	9–3	—	Military Bowl
American†	Memphis Tigers	9–3	—	Miami Beach Bowl
American†	UCF Knights	9–3	—	St. Petersburg Bowl
Big Ten	Ohio State Buckeyes	12–1	4	Sugar Bowl
Big 12†	Baylor Bears	11–1	5	Cotton Bowl Classic
Big 12†	TCU Horned Frogs	11–1	6	Peach Bowl
C-USA	Marshall Thundering Herd	12–1	—	Boca Raton Bowl
MAC	Northern Illinois Huskies	11–2	—	Boca Raton Bowl
Mountain West	Boise State Broncos	11–2	20	Fiesta Bowl
Pac-12	Oregon Ducks	12–1	2	Rose Bowl
SEC	Alabama Crimson Tide	12–1	1	Sugar Bowl
Sun Belt	Georgia Southern Eagles	9–3	—	none‡

† denotes a conference that named co-champions
‡ Georgia Southern was not bowl-eligible, due to their transition from FCS to FBS

=== Bowl-eligible teams ===
- American (6): Cincinnati, East Carolina, Houston, Memphis, Temple, UCF
- ACC (11): Boston College, Clemson, Duke, Florida State, Georgia Tech, Louisville, Miami (FL), NC State, North Carolina, Pittsburgh, Virginia Tech
- Big 12 (7): Baylor, Kansas State, Oklahoma, Oklahoma State, TCU, Texas, West Virginia
- Big Ten (10): Illinois, Iowa, Maryland, Michigan State, Minnesota, Nebraska, Ohio State, Penn State, Rutgers, Wisconsin
- Conference USA (7): Louisiana Tech, Marshall, Middle Tennessee State, Rice, UAB, UTEP, Western Kentucky
- Independents (3): BYU, Navy, Notre Dame
- MAC (6): Bowling Green, Central Michigan, Northern Illinois, Ohio, Toledo, Western Michigan
- Mountain West (7): Air Force, Boise State, Colorado State, Fresno State, Nevada, San Diego State, Utah State
- Pac-12 (8): Arizona, Arizona State, Oregon, Stanford, UCLA, USC, Utah, Washington
- SEC (12): Alabama, Arkansas, Auburn, Florida, Georgia, LSU, Mississippi State, Missouri, Ole Miss, South Carolina, Tennessee, Texas A&M
- Sun Belt (4): Arkansas State, Louisiana–Lafayette, South Alabama, Texas State

Number of bowl berths available: 76
Number of bowl-eligible teams: 81

=== Bowl-eligible teams that did not receive a berth ===
As there were more bowl-eligible teams than bowl berths, five bowl-eligible teams did not receive a bowl berth:

- Middle Tennessee (6–6)
- Ohio (6–6)
- Temple (6–6)
- Texas State (7–5)
- UAB (6–6)

=== Bowl-ineligible teams ===
- American (5): Connecticut, SMU, Tulane, Tulsa, USF
- ACC (3): Syracuse, Virginia, Wake Forest
- Big Ten (4): Indiana, Michigan, Northwestern, Purdue
- Big 12 (3): Iowa State, Kansas, Texas Tech
- Conference USA (6): FIU, Florida Atlantic, North Texas, Old Dominion†, Southern Miss, UTSA
- Independents (1): Army
- MAC (7): Akron, Ball State, Buffalo, Eastern Michigan, Kent State, Massachusetts, Miami (OH)
- Mountain West (5): Hawai'i, New Mexico, San Jose State, UNLV, Wyoming
- Pac 12 (4): California, Colorado, Oregon State, Washington State
- SEC (2): Kentucky, Vanderbilt
- Sun Belt (7): Appalachian State†, Georgia Southern†, Georgia State, Idaho‡, Louisiana–Monroe, New Mexico State, Troy

Number of bowl-ineligible teams: 47

† – Appalachian State (7–5), Georgia Southern (9–3, Sun Belt champions), and Old Dominion (6–6) were conditionally eligible based on win–loss record. However, under FCS-to-FBS transition rules, they were not eligible because enough teams qualified under normal circumstances.

‡ – Idaho was ineligible for postseason play due to an insufficient Academic Progress Rate. However, the Vandals would not have been eligible without the ban, as they finished with a 1–10 record.
