= Bobo Wilson =

American football player (born 1995)

No. 85, 89
- Position: Wide receiver

Personal information
- Born: January 25, 1995 (age 31); Miami, Florida, U.S.
- Listed height: 5 ft 9 in (1.75 m)
- Listed weight: 186 lb (84 kg)

Career information
- High school: Columbus (Miami)
- College: Florida State
- NFL draft: 2017: undrafted

Career history
- Tampa Bay Buccaneers (2017–2019); Carolina Panthers (2019)*; Orlando Guardians (2023)*; Massachusetts Pirates (2023)
- * Offseason or practice squad member only

Career NFL statistics
- Receptions: 7
- Receiving yards: 95
- Receiving touchdowns: 1
- Stats at Pro Football Reference

Jesus "Bobo" Wilson (born January 25, 1995) is an American former professional football player who was a wide receiver in the National Football League (NFL). He played college football for the Florida State Seminoles, and was signed by the Tampa Bay Buccaneers as an undrafted free agent in 2017.

== Professional career ==
=== Tampa Bay Buccaneers ===
Wilson signed with the Tampa Bay Buccaneers as an undrafted free agent on May 1, 2017. He was waived on September 2, 2017 and was signed to the Buccaneers' practice squad the next day. He was promoted to the active roster on November 29, 2017.

On September 1, 2018, Wilson was waived by the Buccaneers and was re-signed to the practice squad.

On October 15, 2019, Wilson was waived by the Buccaneers.

=== Carolina Panthers ===
On December 11, 2019, Wilson was signed to the Panthers practice squad. His squad contract with the team expired on January 6, 2020.

=== Orlando Guardians ===
Wilson was assigned to the Orlando Guardians of the XFL on January 6, 2023. He was released during final roster cuts.

Wilson announced his retirement on September 19, 2023.
