= Evan Baylis =

American football player (born 1993)

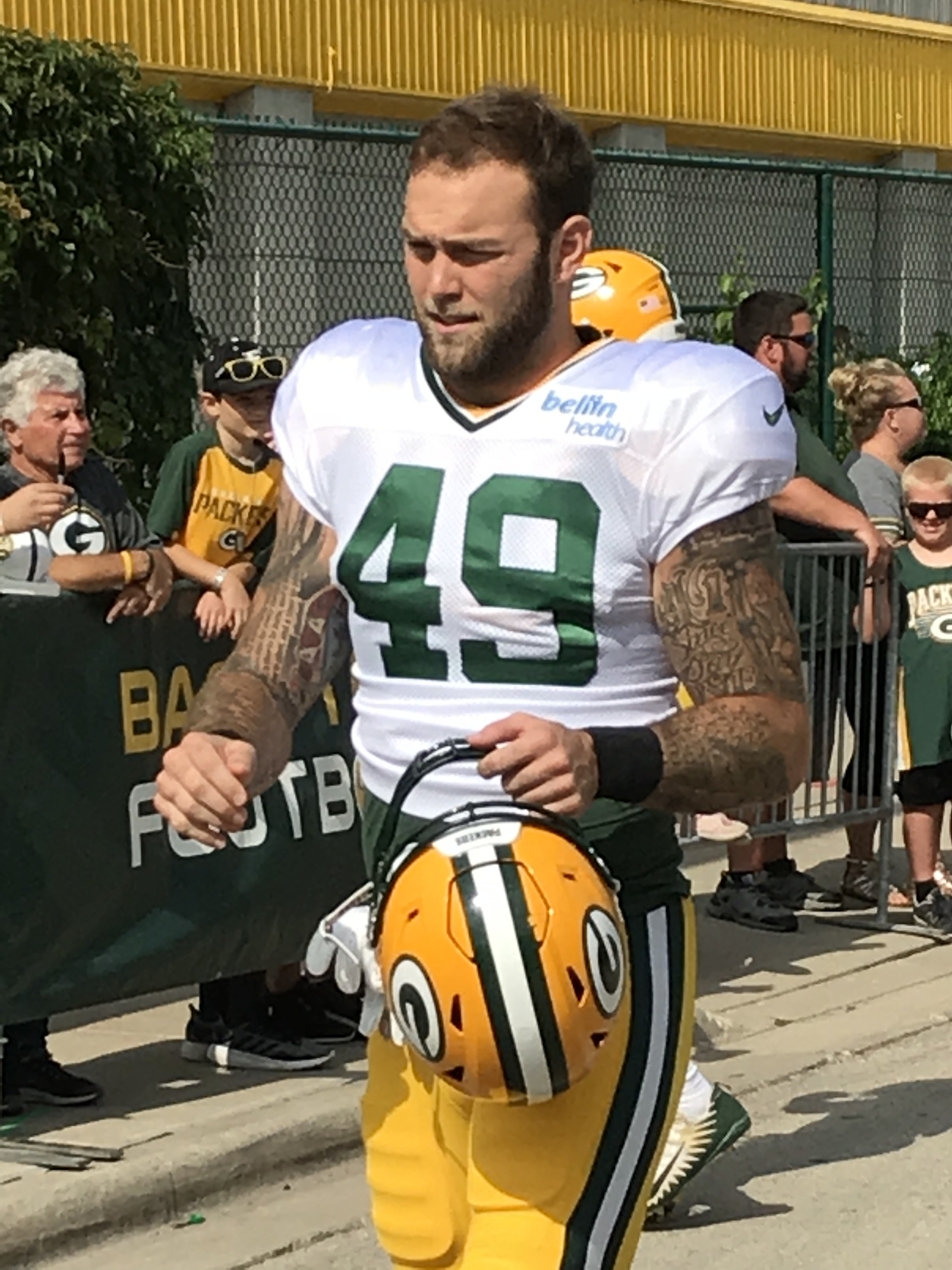
- Baylis with the Green Bay Packers in 2019

No. 81, 88, 89
- Position: Tight end

Personal information
- Born: November 18, 1993 (age 33); Fishers, Indiana, U.S.
- Listed height: 6 ft 5 in (1.96 m)
- Listed weight: 250 lb (113 kg)

Career information
- High school: Grandview (Aurora, Colorado)
- College: Oregon
- NFL draft: 2017: undrafted

Career history
- Houston Texans (2017); Indianapolis Colts (2017)*; Carolina Panthers (2017–2018)*; Green Bay Packers (2018–2019); Arizona Cardinals (2020); Kansas City Chiefs (2020–2021)*
- * Offseason or practice squad member only
- Stats at Pro Football Reference

Evan Luke Baylis (born November 18, 1993) is an American former professional football player who was a tight end in the National Football League (NFL). He played college football for the Oregon Ducks and was originally signed by the Houston Texans as an undrafted free agent in 2017. He was also a member of the Indianapolis Colts, Carolina Panthers, Green Bay Packers, Arizona Cardinals, and Kansas City Chiefs.

== Early life ==
Baylis played high school football at Grandview High School in Aurora, Colorado. He caught 33 passes for 456 yards and 6 touchdowns during his junior year, earning the Colorado All-League 5A Creek First-team honors on offense as an H-back and the Honorable Mention All-State recognition. He caught 24 passes for 225 yards and 2 touchdowns his senior season while also recording 108 tackles and 8 sacks as a linebacker. As a senior, he was named All-League 5A Creek First-team at tight end/fullback, All-Colorado First-team on defense. In 2011, he was the 5A All-State First-team at linebacker.

== College career ==
Baylis played for the Oregon Ducks from 2013 to 2016. He was redshirted in 2012. He made a record of four passes for 71 yards in 2013. Baylis caught 15 passes for 143 yards and one touchdown in 2014, including five catches for 25 yards in the 2015 College Football Playoff National Championship. He caught 16 passes for 229 yards and one touchdown in 2015. He caught nine passes for 68 yards and one touchdown in 2016. Baylis caught 44 passes for 511 yards and three touchdowns during his college career.

== Professional career ==
Baylis was rated the 50th best tight end in the 2017 NFL draft by NFLDraftScout.com.

Pre-draft measurables
Height	Weight	40-yard dash	10-yard split	20-yard split	20-yard shuttle	Three-cone drill	Vertical jump	Broad jump	Bench press
6 ft 5 1/2 in (1.97 m)	244 lb (111 kg)	4.87 s	1.69 s	2.82 s	4.39 s	7.23 s	29 in (0.74 m)	9 ft 6 in (2.90 m)	17 reps
All values from Oregon Pro Day

=== Houston Texans ===
After going undrafted, Baylis signed with the Houston Texans on May 12, 2017. He was waived by the Texans on September 2 and signed to the team's practice squad the next day. Prior to the game against the Cincinnati Bengals on September 14, Texans tight ends C. J. Fiedorowicz, Ryan Griffin and Stephen Anderson were all in the concussion protocol. As a result, Baylis was promoted to the active roster on September 13, 2017, and made his NFL debut as the only active tight end. He was waived by the Texans on September 20.

=== Indianapolis Colts ===
On October 3, 2017, Baylis was signed to the Indianapolis Colts' practice squad, but was waived four days later.

=== Carolina Panthers ===
On October 31, 2017, Baylis was signed to the Carolina Panthers' practice squad. He signed a reserve/future contract with the Panthers on January 8, 2018.

On August 31, 2018, Baylis was waived by the Panthers.

=== Green Bay Packers ===
On December 26, 2018, Baylis was signed to the Green Bay Packers practice squad. He signed a reserve/future contract with the Packers on December 31, 2018.

On August 31, 2019, Baylis was waived by the Packers and was signed to the practice squad the next day. He was promoted to the active roster on September 19, 2019. He was waived again on October 3, 2019, and re-signed to the practice squad. He was promoted back to the active roster on October 14. He was waived on October 29 and re-signed to the practice squad. He signed a reserve/future contract with the Packers on January 21, 2020.

Baylis was waived on September 5, 2020.

=== Arizona Cardinals ===
On September 29, 2020, Baylis was signed to the Arizona Cardinals practice squad. He was elevated to the active roster on October 10 for the team's week 5 game against the New York Jets, and reverted to the practice squad after the game. He was promoted to the active roster on October 19, 2020. He was waived by the Cardinals on October 27, 2020, and re-signed to the practice squad on November 2. He was promoted back to the active roster on November 19. He was waived on November 21 and re-signed to the practice squad three days later. He was promoted back to the active roster on November 28, 2020, but was waived two days later and signed back to the practice squad on December 2. His practice squad contract with the team expired after the season on January 11, 2021.

=== Kansas City Chiefs ===
On January 16, 2021, Baylis signed with the practice squad of the Kansas City Chiefs. On February 9, 2021, Baylis re-signed with the Chiefs. He was waived with an injury designation on August 17. After clearing waivers, he was added to the Chiefs' injured reserve. He was released on August 26 after reaching an injury settlement with the Chiefs.
