= 2013 Fiesta Bowl =

2013 Tostitos Fiesta Bowl
- BCS Bowl Game; 42nd Fiesta Bowl
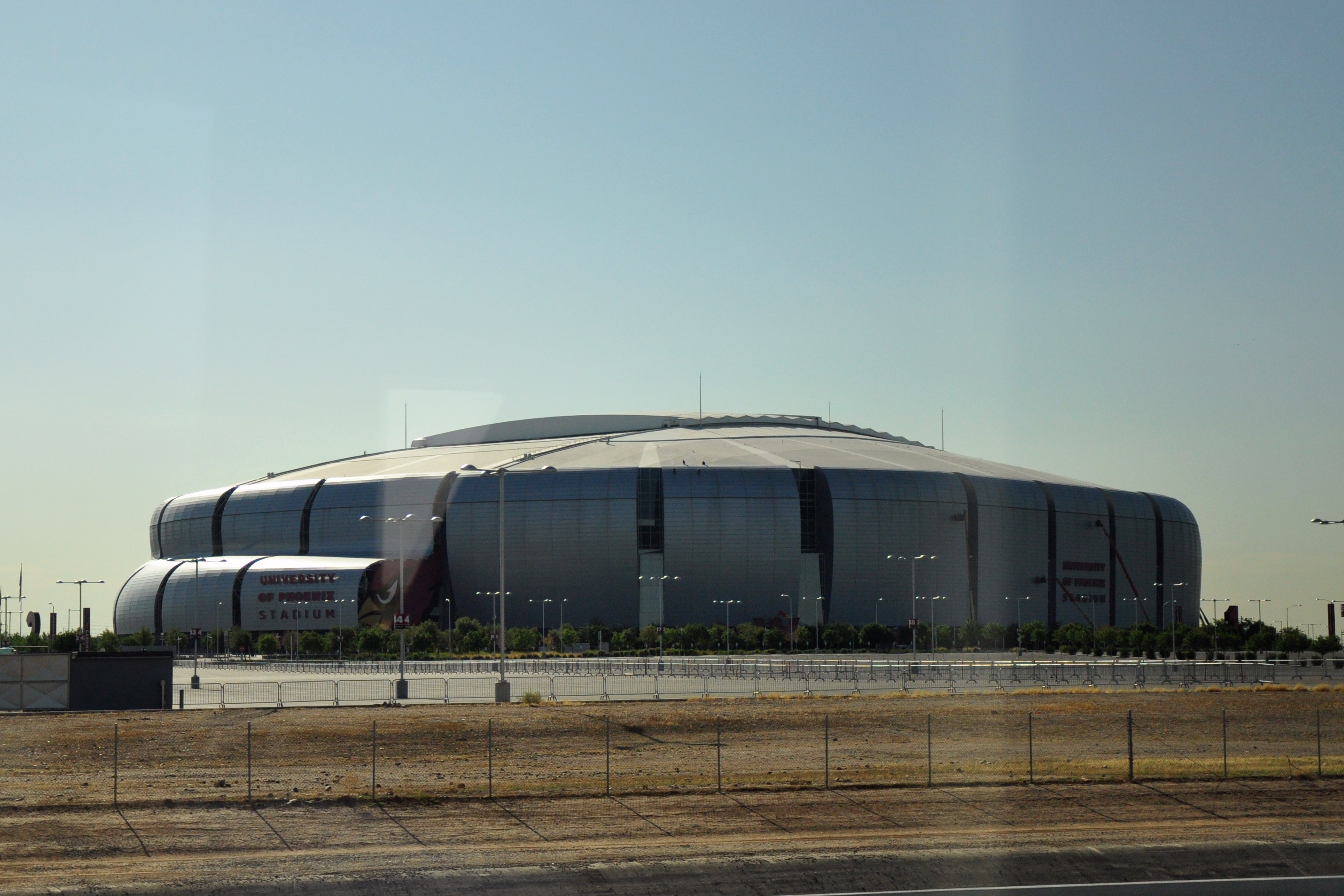
- University of Phoenix Stadium in Glendale, Arizona, hosted the Fiesta Bowl.
Oregon Ducks	Kansas State Wildcats
(11–1)	(11–1)
Pac-12	Big 12
35	17
Head coach: Chip Kelly	Head coach: Bill Snyder
AP / Coaches / BCS; 5 / 3 / 4	AP / Coaches / BCS; 7 / 6 / 5
	1	2	3	4	Total
Oregon	15	7	10	3	35
Kansas State	0	10	0	7	17
- Date: January 3, 2013
- Season: 2012
- Stadium: University of Phoenix Stadium
- Location: Glendale, Arizona
- MVP: Offensive: Marcus Mariota (QB – Oregon); Defensive: Michael Clay (LB – Oregon)
- Favorite: Oregon by 8
- Referee: Ron Cherry (ACC)
- Halftime show: Bands from participants
- Attendance: 70,242

United States TV coverage
- Network: ESPN, ESPN Deportes
- Announcers: ESPN: Brad Nessler (play-by-play); Todd Blackledge (analyst); Holly Rowe (sideline reporter); ESPN Deportes: Eduardo Varela (play-by-play); Pablo Viruega (analyst)
- Nielsen ratings: 7.4

The 2013 Tostitos Fiesta Bowl was a postseason college football bowl game played on Thursday, January 3, 2013, at University of Phoenix Stadium in Glendale, Arizona. The Kansas State Wildcats, champions of the Big 12 Conference, played the Oregon Ducks, an at-large selection from the Pac-12 Conference. It was the only bowl game of the season to feature two top-10 ranked teams, other than the 2013 BCS National Championship Game.

The game started at 6:30 p.m. (MST) and aired on ESPN. Oregon won the game by a score of 35 points to 17 over Kansas State, making its second Fiesta Bowl title for the Ducks (first since 2001 in the 2002 Fiesta Bowl).

== Preview ==
This was the first time Kansas State and Oregon played each other. They were scheduled to meet during the 2011 and 2012 regular seasons but the games were cancelled due to scheduling conflicts. On November 11, 2012, both schools were undefeated (10–0) and were ranked #1 or #2 in the polls and the BCS rankings. However, both schools lost their eleventh game of the season on November 17 to fall from the national championship race. Each finished the regular season with an 11–1 record.

This was the fourth Fiesta Bowl to match a Big 12 (formerly Big Eight) team and a Pac-12 (formerly Pacific-10) team. The previous such Fiesta Bowls occurred in 1983 (Oklahoma vs. Arizona State), 2002 (Colorado, then representing the Big 12, against Oregon) and 2012 (Oklahoma State vs. Stanford).

=== Kansas State ===
K-State attributed its success this season to a balanced offense led by quarterback Collin Klein and an opportunistic defense that included linebacker Arthur Brown. The Wildcats are leading the nation in turnover margin at +21. Klein rushed for 22 touchdowns this season, threw for 10 or more touchdowns in consecutive seasons, passed for more than 4,000 yards and rushed 2,000 yards for a career.

=== Oregon ===
The Oregon Ducks were led by redshirt freshman quarterback Marcus Mariota, who was the Conference's Offensive Freshman of the Year. Mariota, was sixth in the country in passing efficiency, completed 218 of 312 passes for 2,511 yards and 30 touchdowns with six interceptions. All-America running back Kenjon Barner ran for 1,624 yards and scored 22 touchdowns this season, fifth best in rushing (135.3 avg.) and sixth in scoring (11.0 ppg).

== Game summary ==
=== Scoring summary ===
Scoring summary

Quarter	Time	Drive			Team	Scoring information	Score	
Quarter	Time	Plays	Yards	TOP	Team	Scoring information	ORE	KSU
1	14:48	0	94	0:12	ORE	Anthony Cantele kickoff for 59-yards returned by De'Anthony Thomas for 94-yards for a touchdown. Two-point conversion attempt, Dion Jordan rush good	8	0
1	3:46	7	54	2:01	ORE	De'Anthony Thomas 23-yard touchdown reception from Marcus Mariota, Alejandro Maldonado kick good	15	0
2	13:26	10	58	5:20	KSU	Collin Klein 6-yard touchdown run, Anthony Cantele kick good	15	7
2	5:21	12	59	6:36	KSU	25-yard field goal by Anthony Cantele	15	10
2	0:14	5	77	0:46	ORE	Kenjon Barner 24-yard touchdown reception from Marcus Mariota, Alejandro Maldonado kick good	22	10
3	11:01	11	62	2:10	ORE	32-yard field goal by Alejandro Maldonado	25	10
3	8:03	7	61	2:26	ORE	Marcus Mariota 2-yard touchdown run, Alejandro Maldonado kick blocked	31	10
3	8:03	1	-	-	ORE	Alejandro Maldonado PAT blocked by Javonta Boyd and recovered by defense outside end zone; Chris Harper tackled in end zone for one-point conversion safety	32	10
4	11:35	11	72	5:00	KSU	John Hubert 10-yard touchdown reception from Collin Klein, Anthony Cantele kick good	32	17
4	2:27	9	57	5:11	ORE	24-yard field goal by Alejandro Maldonado	35	17
"TOP" = time of possession. For other American football terms, see Glossary of American football.							35	17

=== Statistics ===
	Oregon	Kansas State
First downs	22	20
Total offense, plays – yards	69–384	70–283
Rushes-yards (net)	45–218	37–132
Passing yards (net)	166	151
Safeties (Conversion)	1	0
Passes, completions – attempts – interceptions	12–24–0	17–33–2
Time of possession	26:54	33:06

=== Conversion safety scored ===
A rare type of football scoring occurred during the third quarter on an attempted Oregon extra point, a one-point conversion safety. The one-point safety was awarded to Oregon after Kansas State blocked Oregon's extra-point attempt, recovered the ball in the field of play, then retreated into the end zone where the player with the ball was tackled. This was only the second one-point safety scored in the history of NCAA FBS competition; the other was converted by Texas against Texas A&M on November 26, 2004. Coincidentally, that game was also called by Brad Nessler, the play-by-play announcer for this Fiesta Bowl.
