= Byron Marshall =

American gridiron football player (born 1994)

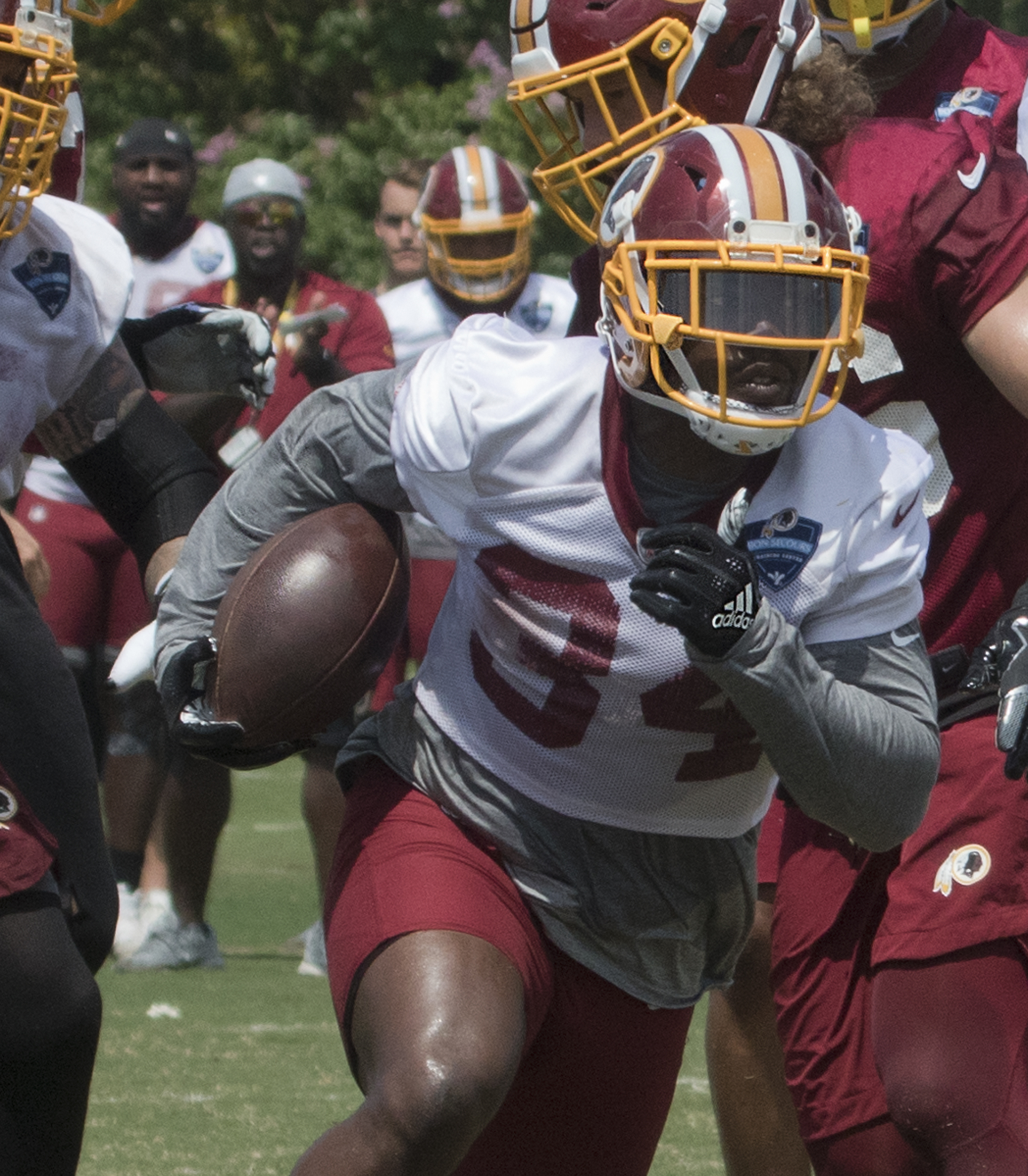
- Marshall with the Washington Redskins in 2018

No. 39, 34
- Position: Running back

Personal information
- Born: February 13, 1994 (age 32); San Jose, California, U.S.
- Listed height: 5 ft 9 in (1.75 m)
- Listed weight: 225 lb (102 kg)

Career information
- High school: Valley Christian (San Jose)
- College: Oregon
- NFL draft: 2016: undrafted

Career history
- Philadelphia Eagles (2016–2017); Washington Redskins (2017–2018); Buffalo Bills (2019)*; Baltimore Ravens (2019)*; Hamilton Tiger-Cats (2021)*; Ottawa Redblacks (2022)*
- * Offseason or practice squad member only

Career NFL statistics
- Rushing attempts: 31
- Rushing yards: 105
- Receptions: 13
- Receiving yards: 76
- Return yards: 239
- Stats at Pro Football Reference

Byron Marshall (born February 13, 1994) is an American former professional football player who was a running back in the National Football League (NFL). He played college football for the Oregon Ducks and was signed by the Philadelphia Eagles as an undrafted free agent in 2016. Marshall was also a member of the Washington Redskins, Buffalo Bills, Baltimore Ravens, Hamilton Tiger-Cats, and Ottawa Redblacks.

== Early life ==
Marshall attended Valley Christian High School in San Jose, California, where he was a three-sport star in football, track, and basketball. He was a four-year letterman in football. He rushed for 914 yards and nine touchdowns his senior year, averaging 9.38 yards per carry, and caught seven passes for 86 yards and one score despite missing three games due to injury. He was named to the all-Mercury News’ second-team. He carried the ball 145 times for 1,360 yards and 20 touchdowns as a junior, as well as catching 10 passes for 115 yards, to be selected to the all-Central Coast first-team. He had a break-out year as a sophomore, rushing for 1,035 yards and 17 touchdowns, while catching 11 passes for 331 yards and four more scores. He was the Cal-Hi Sports State Sophomore of the Year and was a first-team Central Coast choice and West Coast Athletic League pick. As a freshman in 2008, he was intercepted by Mitchell Loquaci in the CCS championship game. He also played in the 2012 Army All-America game. Marshall finished his high school career with 3,386 rushing yards and 57 total touchdowns, both school records.

Also a standout in track & field, Marshall was ranked first among sophomores in California with a time of 10.61 seconds in the 100-meter dash. He placed third place at the National Indoor Championships at 60-meter dash with a time of 6.85 second. He also ran a 4.77-second 40-meter dash and squatted 455 pounds.

A 4-star running back recruit, Marshall committed to play college football at Oregon over offers from Arizona State, California, Notre Dame, Oregon State, UCLA, Utah, and Washington, among others.

== College career ==
Marshall played for Oregon from 2012 to 2015. As a freshman in 2012, he had 87 carries for 447 rushing yards and four rushing touchdowns. As a sophomore in 2013, he became Oregon's 20th 1,000-yard rusher (with 1,038), finishing fifth in the Pac-12 in rushing (with 86.5 yards per game) in 2013. Against UCLA, he gained 133 yards with three touchdowns to cap five straight games rushing over the century mark. As a junior in 2014, Marshall finished the year with 1,003 yards receiving on 74 catches. He became the first player in conference history to ever rush for 1,000 yards and also accumulate 1,000 receiving yards in his collegiate career. The Ducks leading receiver also came up big in the national championship, where he grabbed eight receptions for 169 yards and one touchdown. As a senior, Marshall missed all but the first four games of 2015 with a leg injury, accumulating 121 yards and two touchdowns on nine catches.

=== Collegiate statistics ===
Year	School	Conf	Class	Pos	G	Rushing				Receiving			
Year	School	Conf	Class	Pos	G	Att	Yds	Avg	TD	Rec	Yds	Avg	TD
2012	Oregon	Pac-12	FR	RB	11	87	447	5.1	4	1	14	14.0	0
2013	Oregon	Pac-12	SO	RB	12	168	1038	6.2	14	13	155	11.9	0
2014	Oregon	Pac-12	JR	RB	15	52	392	7.5	1	74	1,003	13.6	6
2015	Oregon	Pac-12	SR	WR	4	0	0	0.0	0	9	121	13.4	2
Career					42	307	1,877	6.1	19	97	1,293	13.3	8

== Professional career ==
=== Philadelphia Eagles ===
Marshall went undrafted in the 2016 NFL draft and signed with the Philadelphia Eagles. On September 3, 2016, he was released by the Eagles. The next day, he was signed to the Eagles' practice squad. He was promoted to the active roster on December 13, 2016. On December 18, he made his NFL debut against the Baltimore Ravens with nine carries for 22 rushing yards. Overall, in the 2016 season, he appeared in three games and had 19 carries for 64 rushing yards.

On September 2, 2017, Marshall was waived by the Eagles, and was signed to the practice squad the following day.

=== Washington Redskins ===
On November 14, 2017, Marshall was signed by the Washington Redskins off the Eagles' practice squad. After suffering a hamstring injury in the Week 14 loss to the Los Angeles Chargers, he was placed on injured reserve on December 12, 2017. He finished the 2017 season with nine carries for 32 yards and six receptions for 36 yards in four games.

On September 5, 2018, Marshall was placed on injured reserve with an ankle injury. He was activated from injured reserve on November 17, 2018, after an injury to Samaje Perine. In the 2018 season, he had three carries for nine yards, along with four receptions for 30 yards in six games. Marshall was waived on September 1, 2019, after the team had claimed running back Wendell Smallwood off waivers.

=== Buffalo Bills ===
The Buffalo Bills signed Marshall to their practice squad on September 3, 2019. He was released on October 8.

=== Baltimore Ravens ===
On November 6, 2019, Marshall was signed to the Baltimore Ravens practice squad. His practice squad contract with the team expired on January 20, 2020.

=== Hamilton Tiger-Cats ===
Marshall signed with the Hamilton Tiger-Cats of the CFL on February 11, 2021. He was released by the Ti-Cats on July 29, 2021, as part of the team's final roster cuts.

=== Ottawa Redblacks ===
Marshall signed with the Ottawa Redblacks of the CFL on March 18, 2022. He was released as part of the team's final roster cuts on June 4, 2022.

== Personal life ==
Marshall is the younger brother of running back Cameron Marshall.
