= 2014 Oregon Ducks football team =

American college football season

2014 Oregon Ducks football

Rose Bowl champion Pac-12 champion Pac-12 North Division champion

Pac-12 Championship Game, W 51–13 vs. Arizona

Rose Bowl (CFP Semifinal) W 59–20 vs. Florida State CFP National Championship, L 20–42 vs. Ohio State
- Conference: Pac-12 Conference
- North Division

Ranking
- Coaches: No. 2
- AP: No. 2
- CFP: No. 2
- Record: 13–2 (8–1 Pac-12)
- Head coach: Mark Helfrich (2nd season)
- Offensive coordinator: Scott Frost (2nd season)
- Offensive scheme: No-huddle spread option
- Defensive coordinator: Don Pellum (1st season)
- Base defense: Hybrid 3–4
- Captain: Game captains
- Home stadium: Autzen Stadium

2014 Pac-12 Conference football standings
	Conf.			Overall
Team	W		L	W		L
North Division
No. 2 Oregon xy$^	8	–	1	13	–	2
Stanford	5	–	4	8	–	5
Washington	4	–	5	8	–	6
California	3	–	6	5	–	7
Oregon State	2	–	7	5	–	7
Washington State	2	–	7	3	–	9
South Division
No. 19 Arizona xy	7	–	2	10	–	4
No. 10 UCLA	6	–	3	10	–	3
No. 12 Arizona State	6	–	3	10	–	3
No. 20 USC	6	–	3	9	–	4
No. 21 Utah	5	–	4	9	–	4
Colorado	0	–	9	2	–	10
Championship: Oregon 51, Arizona 13
^ – College Football Playoff participant; $ – Conference champion; x – Division champion/co-champions; y – Championship game participant; Rankings from AP Poll

The 2014 Oregon Ducks football team represented the University of Oregon in the 2014 NCAA Division I FBS football season. The team was led by second-year head coach Mark Helfrich and played their home games at Autzen Stadium, in Eugene, Oregon, for the 48th straight year. They are a member of the Pac-12 Conference in the North Division.

The 2014 Ducks finished the season with a 13–2 overall record, went 8–1 in Pac-12 play, and outscored their opponents by a combined total of 681 to 354. The Ducks won the Pac-12 North Division for the second time since the division's creation in 2011, advancing to the Pac-12 Football Championship Game, where they defeated the Arizona Wildcats 51–13. The Ducks played in the inaugural College Football Playoff, netting a berth in the 2014 Rose Bowl semifinal game, where they defeated the Florida State Seminoles 59–20, advancing to the 2014 College Football Playoff National Championship game facing the Ohio State Buckeyes. This was Oregon's second-ever national championship game appearance (their first was the 2010 BCS National Championship Game, in which they lost to Auburn). They were defeated in the National Championship by Ohio State by a score of 42–20. The Ducks finished the season as consensus national runners-up behind the national champion Buckeyes and ahead of Peach Bowl victors TCU.

The Oregon offense ranked among the very best in the country and was led by junior quarterback Marcus Mariota, who became the first player in school history to win the Heisman Trophy, distinguishing him as the best player in college football. Mariota led the nation in touchdowns responsible for, total yards, and passer efficiency rating.

== Departing players ==
Following the 2013 season there was a whirlwind of speculation in Eugene about the futures of several star players eligible to leave early for the NFL. The first announcements came from starting quarterback Marcus Mariota (RSo.) and starting center Hroniss Grasu (Jr.), declaring that they would stay at Oregon in order to finish their degrees. Later in the week, defensive leaders Tony Washington (RJr.) and Derrick Malone (Jr.) announced that they too would be staying in Eugene to finish their education.

The first Duck to declare that he would be leaving school early and pursuing a career in the NFL was starting cornerback Terrance Mitchell (Jr.), many considered it to be a poor decision, and that another year in college would boost his potential draft status. Nonetheless, he was drafted in the seventh round by the Dallas Cowboys and did not end up making the final roster, he was signed by the Chicago Bears as a member of their practice squad prior to the 2014 NFL season.

Following the surprise announcement from Terrance Mitchell, the most anticipated announcement finally came from star running back De'Anthony Thomas (Jr.), declaring that he will forgo his senior year and enter the NFL Draft. Few people were surprised by this decision after recording three solid years as a featured part of the ducks offense, setting records in the Rose Bowl and Fiesta Bowl. He would go on to be drafted in the fifth round by the Kansas City Chiefs and would make the final 53-man roster, showing off his value to the team in his first NFL appearance, returning a punt 80-yards for a touchdown.

The final announcement came from Ifo Ekpre-Olomu (Jr.) declaring that he would stay at Oregon in order to earn his degree and hone his skills as a cornerback.

Other notable departures due to graduation included record breaking receiver Josh Huff who would be drafted by Oregon's former head coach Chip Kelly to be a member of the Philadelphia Eagles, as well as three starting defensive tackles Taylor Hart, Ricky Havili-Heimuli and Wade Keliikipi.

Num	Player	Position	Starter	Class	Drafted	Round	Pick	Team	Notes
1	Josh Huff	WR	Y	SR	Y	3	86	Philadelphia Eagles	
6	De'Anthony Thomas	RB	Y	JR	Y	4	124	Kansas City Chiefs	
12	Brian Jackson	DB	Y	SR	N				
14	Dustin Haines	QB	N	SR	N				
15	Colt Lyerla	TE	Y†	JR	N				UFA – Green Bay Packers
16	Daryle Hawkins	WR	N	SR	N				UFA - Chicago Bears
25	Boseko Lokombo	LB	Y	SR	N				
26	Ben Butterfield	DB	N	SR	N				
27	Terrance Mitchell	DB	Y	JR	Y	7	254	Dallas Cowboys	
21	Avery Patterson	DB	Y	SR	N				UFA – Baltimore Ravens
37	Jordan Thompson	RB	N	SR	N				
39	Drew Howell	LS	Y	SR	N				
50	Ryan Hagen	DT	N	SR	N				
63	Mana Greig	OL	Y	SR	N				
65	Brian Teague	OL	N	SR	N				
66	Taylor Hart	DT	Y	SR	Y	5	141	Philadelphia Eagles	
71	Everett Benyard	OL	Y	SR	N				
78	Karrington Armstrong	OL	N	SR	N				
84	Chad Delaney	WR	N	SR	N				
90	Ricky Havili-Heimuli	DT	Y	SR	N				UFA – Jacksonville Jaguars
92	Wade Keliikipi	DT	Y	SR	N				UFA – Philadelphia Eagles

† - Colt Lyerla left the team in September 2013 after missing game time due to suspension and illness. After leaving the team Lyerla was arrested for use and possession of cocaine. After the season Lyerla participated in the NFL Combine as well as Oregon's Pro Day.

== Before the season ==
=== Returning starters ===
Offense

No.	Player	Class	Position
8	Marcus Mariota	(redshirt) Junior	Quarterback
9	Byron Marshall	Junior	Runningback
54	Hamani Stevens	(redshirt) Senior	Right guard
55	Hroniss Grasu	(redshirt) Senior	Center
72	Andre Yruretagoyena	(redshirt) Junior	Left guard
75	Jake Fisher	Senior	Right tackle
83	Johnny Mundt	Sophomore	Tight end

Defense

No.	Player	Class	Position
9	Arik Armstead	Junior	Defensive tackle
14	Ifo Ekpre-Olomu	Senior	Cornerback
22	Derrick Malone	(redshirt) Senior	Outside Linebacker
48	Rodney Hardrick	(redshirt) Junior	Inside linebacker
91	Tony Washington	(redshirt) Senior	Defensive end

Special teams

No.	Player	Class	Position
49	Matt Wogan	Sophomore	Place Kicker

=== Recruiting ===
College recruiting (2014)
Name	Hometown	School	Height	Weight	40^{‡}	Commit date
Jalen Brown; WR	Phoenix, AZ	Mountain Pointe HS	6 ft 2 in (1.88 m)	178 lb (81 kg)	4.5	Oct 14, 2013
Jalen Brown; WR	Recruit ratings: Scout: Rivals: 247Sports: ESPN:					
Tanner Carew; OL	La Verne, CA	Damien HS	6 ft 2 in (1.88 m)	210 lb (95 kg)		Jun 15, 2013
Tanner Carew; OL	Recruit ratings: Scout: Rivals: 247Sports: ESPN:					
Tyrell Crosby; OL	Henderson, NV	Green Valley HS	6 ft 4 in (1.93 m)	298 lb (135 kg)	5.33	Apr 15, 2013
Tyrell Crosby; OL	Recruit ratings: Scout: Rivals: 247Sports: ESPN:					
Braden Eggert; OL	Napa, CA	Napa HS	6 ft 7 in (2.01 m)	305 lb (138 kg)		Nov 20, 2013
Braden Eggert; OL	Recruit ratings: Scout: Rivals: 247Sports: ESPN:					
Royce Freeman; RB	Imperial, CA	Imperial HS	6 ft 0 in (1.83 m)	227 lb (103 kg)		Jul 12, 2013
Royce Freeman; RB	Recruit ratings: Scout: Rivals: 247Sports: ESPN:					
Dominique Harrison; DB	San Pablo, CA	Contra Costa CC	5 ft 11 in (1.80 m)	190 lb (86 kg)		Jun 6, 2013
Dominique Harrison; DB	Recruit ratings: Scout: Rivals: 247Sports: ESPN:					
Justin Hollins; DE	Arlington, TX	Martin HS	6 ft 5 in (1.96 m)	205 lb (93 kg)		Oct 28, 2013
Justin Hollins; DE	Recruit ratings: Scout: Rivals: 247Sports: ESPN:					
Glen Ihenacho; DB	Gardena, CA	Junipero Serra HS	5 ft 11 in (1.80 m)	180 lb (82 kg)		Nov 21, 2013
Glen Ihenacho; DB	Recruit ratings: Scout: Rivals: 247Sports: ESPN:					
Tony Brooks-James; RB	Gainesville, FL	Gainesville HS	5 ft 9 in (1.75 m)	175 lb (79 kg)		Sep 29, 2013
Tony Brooks-James; RB	Recruit ratings: Scout: Rivals: 247Sports: ESPN:					
Jalen Jelks; DE	Phoenix, AZ	Desert Vista HS	6 ft 5 in (1.96 m)	245 lb (111 kg)		Jul 22, 2013
Jalen Jelks; DE	Recruit ratings: Scout: Rivals: 247Sports: ESPN:					
Haniteli Lousi; OL	San Mateo, CA	College of San Mateo	6 ft 5 in (1.96 m)	290 lb (130 kg)		Dec 10, 2013
Haniteli Lousi; OL	Recruit ratings: Scout: Rivals: 247Sports: ESPN:					
Morgan Mahalak; QB	Kenfield, CA	Martin Catholic HS	6 ft 3 in (1.91 m)	190 lb (86 kg)		Apr 30, 2013
Morgan Mahalak; QB	Recruit ratings: Scout: Rivals: 247Sports: ESPN:					
Austin Maloata; DE	Corona, CA	Centennial HS	6 ft 3 in (1.91 m)	248 lb (112 kg)		Feb 1, 2014
Austin Maloata; DE	Recruit ratings: Scout: Rivals: 247Sports: ESPN:					
Jake McCreath; TE	Modesto, CA	Modesto CC	6 ft 4 in (1.93 m)	250 lb (110 kg)		Mar 21, 2014
Jake McCreath; TE	Recruit ratings: No ratings found					
Mattrell McGraw; S	New Orleans, LA	John Curtis HS	5 ft 10 in (1.78 m)	180 lb (82 kg)	4.59	Feb 5, 2014
Mattrell McGraw; S	Recruit ratings: Scout: Rivals: 247Sports: ESPN:					
Henry Mondeaux; TE	Portland, OR	Jesuit HS	6 ft 4 in (1.93 m)	245 lb (111 kg)	4.80	Nov 25, 2013
Henry Mondeaux; TE	Recruit ratings: Scout: Rivals: 247Sports: ESPN:					
Charles Nelson; ATH	Daytona Beach, FL	Seabreeze HS	5 ft 9 in (1.75 m)	170 lb (77 kg)		Jan 27, 2014
Charles Nelson; ATH	Recruit ratings: Scout: Rivals: 247Sports: ESPN:					
Khalil Oliver; DB	Meridian, ID	Rocky Mountain HS	6 ft 1 in (1.85 m)	180 lb (82 kg)	4.7	Feb 5, 2014
Khalil Oliver; DB	Recruit ratings: Scout: Rivals: 247Sports: ESPN:					
Arrion Springs; DB	San Antonio, TX	Roosevelt HS	5 ft 11 in (1.80 m)	190 lb (86 kg)	4.48	Jul 2, 2013
Arrion Springs; DB	Recruit ratings: Scout: Rivals: 247Sports: ESPN:					
Jimmie Swain; LB	Olathe, KS	North HS	6 ft 3 in (1.91 m)	219 lb (99 kg)	4.51	Jan 5, 2014
Jimmie Swain; LB	Recruit ratings: Scout: Rivals: 247Sports: ESPN:					
Tui Talia; DE	Pleasant Hill, CA	Diablo Valley CC	6 ft 5 in (1.96 m)	270 lb (120 kg)	4.75	Oct 14, 2013
Tui Talia; DE	Recruit ratings: Scout: Rivals: 247Sports: ESPN:					
Overall recruit ranking:
‡ Refers to 40-yard dash; Note: In many cases, Scout, Rivals, 247Sports, On3, and ESPN may conflict in their listings of height, weight and 40 time.; In these cases, the average was taken. ESPN grades are on a 100-point scale.; Sources: "2014 Team Ranking". Rivals.com.

=== Preseason All-Americans ===
Oregon had three players selected as Preseason All-Americans going into the season. Marcus Mariota was largely recognized on the second team of those organizations which published preseason lists. Hroniss Grasu and Ifo Ekpre-Olomu were recognized as unanimous Preseason All-Americans, with Grasu being selected to the first team of every publication.

Quarterback

- Marcus Mariota, Junior, Quarterback (SI, Athlon, USA Today, ESPN, CBS Sports, CFN)

Offensive line

- Hroniss Grasu, Senior, Center (SI, Athlon, USA Today, ESPN, CBS Sports, CFN, Scout.com)

Defensive back

- Ifo Ekpre-Olomu, Senior, Cornerback (SI, Athlon, USA Today, ESPN, CBS Sports, CFN, Scout.com)

=== Awards watchlists ===
Overall Awards

Maxwell Award – College Football Player of the Year

- Marcus Mariota
- Byron Marshall
- Thomas Tyner

Walter Camp Award – Player of the Year

- Marcus Mariota
- Ifo Ekpre-Olomu

Lombardi Award – Best Lineman

- Hroniss Grasu
- Tyler Johnstone
- Derrick Malone

Offensive Awards

Davey O'Brien Award – Best Quarterback

- Marcus Mariota

Doak Walker Award – Best Runningback

- Byron Marshall
- Thomas Tyner

Mackey Award – Most Outstanding Collegiate Tight End

- Pharaoh Brown
- Johnny Mundt

Rimington Trophy – Most Outstanding Collegiate Center

- Hroniss Grasu

Outland Trophy – Best Interior Lineman in College Football

- Hroniss Grasu
- Tyler Johnstone

Defensive Awards

Bednarik Award – Defensive Player of the Year

- Ifo Ekpre-Olomu

Bronko Nagurski Trophy – Most Outstanding Defensive Player

- Ifo Ekpre-Olomu
- Derrick Malone
- Tony Washington

Jim Thorpe Award – Best Defensive Back

- Ifo Ekpre-Olomu

Butkus Award – Best Linebacker

- Derrick Malone

=== Spring football ===
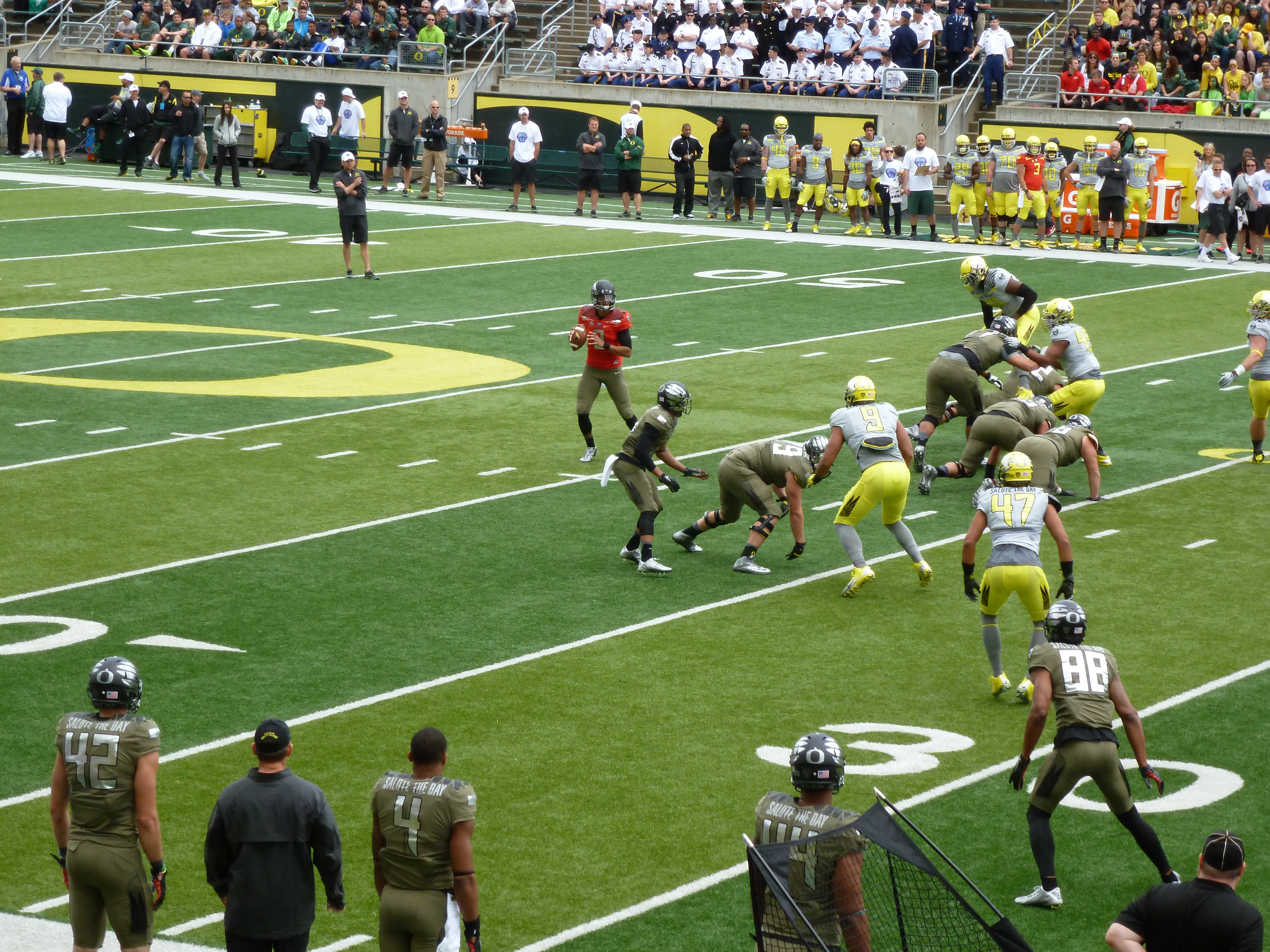
Marcus Mariota surveys the field on a pass play during the first quarter of the 2014 Oregon Duck Spring Game.

On May 3, 2014, Oregon capped off its spring football camp with a scrimmage at Autzen Stadium that was open to the public and broadcast live on the Pac-12 Network. The Monday before the game, team captains were selected followed by a draft. Quarterback Marcus Mariota and center Hroniss Grasu captained team "Mariasu" which was coached by the offensive coordinator Scott Frost and the other offensive coaches. Defensive end Tony Washington and cornerback Ifo Ekpre-Olomu captained team "Twifo" which was coached by defensive coordinator Don Pellum and the other defensive coaches; head coach Mark Helfrich observed the game from the field.

As has been the case for the past several years, the spring game was dedicated to the United States Armed Forces, specifically local units that include 6th Engineer Support Battalion in Portland, Oregon and the Oregon National Guard. Service-members were given special seating at the 50-yard line, ran onto the field with the players and were given the jerseys worn by the players immediately following the game. In between the first and second quarters a group of soon-to-be soldiers took the oath of enlistment in the west end-zone and at half-time an American Flag was presented by the Oregon National Guard to the University President Michael R. Gottfredson.

In addition to honoring the troops, the spring game is used as a means to boost donations to Food for Lane County, a local non-profit food bank. There is no monetary cost of admission to enter the game, however a donation of 3 non-perishable food items per person is encouraged. Food for Lane County has reported donations just short of sixty thousand pounds of non-perishable food.

Unlike the previous year's spring game, this game was as close to normal football rules as possible. The first half followed all NCAA rules and regulations, with the second half featuring a running clock.

Marcus Mariota led back to back scoring drives to start off the game, throwing touchdown passes to Thomas Tyner and Devon Allen, after that the star quarterback sat out the rest of the game. For the remainder of the first half the defenses of both teams took control, not allowing another score and forcing several turnovers. After the half-time ceremonies team Mariasu got on the board again, this time on the arm of Jeff Lockie throwing to Austin Daich. It took until the fourth quarter for team Twifo to score on a touchdown pass from Taylor Allie to Darren Carrington, team Mariasu would respond with a touchdown pass from Damion Hobbs to Devon Allen, however the play occurred as time expired so no PAT was attempted.

2014 Oregon Duck Football Spring Game – Game summary

Quarter	1	2	3	4	Total
Twifo	0	0	0	7	7
Mariasu	14	0	7	6	27

at Autzen Stadium • Eugene, OR

- Date: May 3, 2014
- Game time: 11:07 a.m. PST
- Game weather: Temperature: 57 °F (14 °C) • Wind: SW 12 • Weather: Partly Cloudy
- Game attendance: 37,129
- TV: P12N
- http://www.goducks.com/pdf9/2708622.pdf

Game information

First quarter

- Mariasu – Thomas Tyner 22-yard pass from Marcus Mariota (Eric Solis kick)
- Mariasu – Devon Allen 45-yard pass from Mariota (Solis kick)

Third quarter

- Mariasu – Austin Daich 41-yard pass from Jeff Lockie (Solis kick)

Fourth quarter

- Twifo – Darren Carrington 20-yard pass from Taylor Allie (Matt Wogan kick)
- Mariasu – Allen 49-yard pass from Damion Hobbs (No kick, end of regulation)

Top passers

- Twifo – Jake Rodrigues, 7-18, 66 yards, 1 INT
- Mariasu – Jeff Lockie, 7-12, 121 yards, 1 TD

Top rushers

- Twifo – Kani Benoit, 5 carries, 44 yards
- Mariasu – Thomas Tyner, 10 carries, 58 yards

Top receiving

- Twifo – Darren Carrington, 3 receptions, 47 yards, 1 TD
- Mariasu – Devon Allen, 2 receptions, 94 yards, 2 TD

Top tackler

- Twifo – Juwaan Williams, 9 total, 7 solo
- Mariasu – Tui Talia, 5 total, 4 solo, 1 TFL

== Schedule ==
The 2014 Pac-12 schedule was officially released on January 8, 2014. For their non-conference slate the Ducks played against the South Dakota Coyotes of the Missouri Valley Conference, the Michigan State Spartans, the 2014 Rose Bowl winners and reigning Big Ten conference champions, and the Wyoming Cowboys of the Mountain West Conference.

Date	Time	Opponent	Rank	Site	TV	Result	Attendance
August 30	7:30 p.m.	South Dakota*	No. 3	Autzen Stadium; Eugene, OR	P12N	W 62–13	57,388
September 6	3:30 p.m.	No. 7 Michigan State*	No. 3	Autzen Stadium; Eugene, OR (College GameDay)	FOX	W 46–27	59,456
September 13	11:00 a.m.	Wyoming*	No. 2	Autzen Stadium; Eugene, OR	P12N	W 48–14	56,533
September 20	7:30 p.m.	at Washington State	No. 2	Martin Stadium; Pullman, WA	ESPN	W 38–31	32,952
October 2	7:30 p.m.	Arizona	No. 2	Autzen Stadium; Eugene, OR	ESPN	L 24–31	56,032
October 11	12:30 p.m.	at No. 18 UCLA	No. 12	Rose Bowl; Pasadena, CA	FOX	W 42–30	80,138
October 18	5:00 p.m.	Washington^{†}	No. 9	Autzen Stadium; Eugene, OR (rivalry)	FS1	W 45–20	57,858
October 24	7:00 p.m.	at California	No. 6	Levi's Stadium; Santa Clara, CA	FS1	W 59–41	55,575
November 1	4:30 p.m.	Stanford	No. 5	Autzen Stadium; Eugene, OR (rivalry)	FOX	W 45–16	58,974
November 8	7:00 p.m.	at No. 17 Utah	No. 4	Rice–Eccles Stadium; Salt Lake City, UT	ESPN	W 51–27	47,528
November 22	1:30 p.m.	Colorado	No. 3	Autzen Stadium; Eugene, OR	P12N	W 44–10	55,898
November 29	5:00 p.m.	at Oregon State	No. 2	Reser Stadium; Corvallis, OR (Civil War)	ABC	W 47–19	45,722
December 5	6:20 p.m.	vs. No. 7 Arizona*	No. 2	Levi's Stadium; Santa Clara, CA (Pac-12 Championship Game)	FOX	W 51–13	45,618
January 1, 2015	2:10 p.m.	vs. No. 2 (3) Florida State*	No. 3 (2)	Rose Bowl; Pasadena, CA (Rose Bowl–CFP Semifinal, College GameDay)	ESPN	W 59–20	91,322
January 12	5:30 p.m.	vs. No. 4 (4) Ohio State*	No. 2 (2)	AT&T Stadium; Arlington, TX (CFP National Championship, College GameDay)	ESPN	L 20–42	85,689
*Non-conference game; ^{†}Homecoming; Rankings from AP Poll and CFP Rankings after October 28 released prior to game; All times are in Pacific time

== Rankings ==
Entering the 2014 season the Ducks were ranked at number 3 in the AP Preseason Poll and number 4 in the Coaches' Preseason Poll, receiving a first place vote in each. After a dominant performance against South Dakota the Ducks remained at number 3 and number 4 in the AP and USA Today polls respectively, but gained first placed votes in each. Following a decisive victory over #7 Michigan State the Ducks rose to second in the AP poll, while remaining fourth in the USA Coaches Poll. Coming out of a week three victory over Wyoming the Ducks maintained their second place slot in the AP poll and rose to third in USA Today Coaches' Poll, earning first place votes in each.

Following their first conference victory the Ducks lost ground in both polls, falling to fourth in the Coaches' Poll and losing 5 five first place votes in the AP poll due to their unconvincing victory over Washington State. The Ducks continued to slide down the polls following a crushing upset by Arizona, falling to twelfth in the AP poll and eleventh in the Coaches'. However, the Ducks soon rebounded, rising up through the polls and finishing at number 2 in the CFP poll and number 3 in both the AP and the coaches' polls at the conclusion of the regular season. After their 59–20 win over FSU in the Rose Bowl, the Ducks met the Ohio State Buckeyes in the College Football Playoff National Championship, where they lost 42–20, finishing their season ranked #2 in both the AP and the Coaches polls.

Ranking movements Legend: ██ Increase in ranking ██ Decrease in ranking ( ) = First-place votes
	Week																
Poll	Pre	1	2	3	4	5	6	7	8	9	10	11	12	13	14	15	Final
AP	3 (1)	3 (5)	2 (16)	2 (17)	2 (12)	2 (11)	12	9	6	5	5	3	3 (1)	3 (2)	3 (5)	3 (8)	2
Coaches	4 (1)	4 (2)	4 (6)	3 (6)	4 (3)	4 (7)	11	9	7	6	5	4 (1)	3 (6)	3 (6)	3 (6)	3 (7)	2
CFP	Not released									5	4	2	2	2	2	2	Not released

== Personnel ==
Oregon head coach Mark Helfrich returns in his second year as Oregon's head coach following what many have considered to be a disappointing debut season, even though he earned 11 wins, including a bowl game victory, something never before achieved by a first year Oregon head coach. Following the retirement of longtime defensive coordinator & outside linebackers coach Nick Aliotti at the end of the 2013 season Oregon promoted veteran inside linebackers coach and University of Oregon alumni Don Pellum to the defensive coordinator position (he would maintain the inside linebackers coach position). To fill the opening at outside linebackers coach Oregon hired former graduate assistant Erik Chinander who at the time was working for the Philadelphia Eagles.

The Ducks continue to have the longest tenured staff of any college football program in the United States. Six of the ten assistant positions are staffed by men who have coached at Oregon for over ten years, four of whom have over 25 years of experience as Oregon assistant coaches.

=== Roster ===
2014 Oregon Ducks football team roster
Players
Coaches
Offense

Pos.	#	Name	Class
WR	1	Chance Allen	So
WR	5	Devon Allen (injured)	Fr
WR	6	Charles Nelson	Fr
WR	7	Keanon Lowe	Sr
QB	8	Marcus Mariota (C)	Jr
RB	9	Byron Marshall	Jr
WR	10	Johnathan Loyd	Sr
WR	11	Bralon Addison (injured)	Jr
QB	12	Taylor Alie	Fr
WR	15	Jalen Brown	Fr
QB	16	Morgan Mahalak	Fr
QB	17	Jeff Lockie	So
RB	20	Tony Brooks-James	Fr
RB	21	Royce Freeman	Fr
WR	23	B. J. Kelly	Jr
RB	24	Thomas Tyner	So
RB	26	Casey Eugenio	Fr
WR	27	Jeff Bieber	Fr
RB	30	Ayele Forde	Sr
RB	31	Kenny Bassett	Sr
RB	34	Lane Roseberry	So
RB	36	Kani Benoit	Fr
RB	37	J.J. Jones	So
TE	40	Taylor Stinson	Fr
WR	41	Blake Stanton	Sr
OL	54	Hamani Stevens	Sr
OL	55	Hroniss Grasu (C)	Sr
OL	57	Doug Brenner	Fr
OL	61	Brigham Stoehr	Fr
OL	62	Matt Pierson	Jr
OL	63	Davis Miyashiro	Fr
OL	64	Tyler Johnstone (injured)	Jr
OL	67	Tanner Davies	Fr
OL	68	Jamal Prater	Jr
OL	69	Brandon Thomas	Jr
OL	70	Matthew McFadden	So
OL	71	Braden Eggert	Fr
OL	72	Andre Yruretagoyena	Jr
OL	73	Tyrell Crosby	Fr
OL	74	Elijah George	Fr
OL	75	Jake Fisher	Sr
OL	76	Jake Pisarcik	Fr
OL	77	Cameron Hunt	So
OL	77	Haniteli Louisi	Jr
OL	79	Evan Voeller	Fr
TE	80	Koa Ka’ai	Jr
TE	81	Evan Baylis	So
TE	82	Davaysia Hagger	Fr
TE	83	Johnny Mundt	So
TE	85	Pharoah Brown (injured)	Jr
WR	85	Dwayne Stanford	So
WR	86	Austin Daich	So
WR	87	Darren Carrington	Fr
WR	88	Jeff Stolzenburg	Sr
WR	89	Chris Tewhill	So

Defense

Pos.	#	Name	Class
CB	1	Arrion Springs	Fr
DB	2	Tyree Robinson	Fr
CB	3	Dior Mathis	Sr
FS	4	Erick Dargan	Sr
DB	5	Isaac Dixon	Jr
CB	6	Dominique Harrison	Jr
DB	8	Reggie Daniels	So
DL	9	Arik Armstead	Jr
DB	10	Chris Seisay	Fr
CB	13	Troy Hill	Sr
CB	14	Ifo Ekpre-Olomu (injured) (C)	Sr
DB	17	Juwaan Williams	Fr
LB	18	Jimmie Swain	Fr
DB	21	Mattrell McGraw	Fr
LB	22	Derrick Malone (C)	Sr
DB	25	Glen Ihenacho	Fr
DB	26	Kahlil Oliver	Fr
LB	27	Johnny Ragin III	So
DB	29	Stephen Amoako	So
LB	31	Justin Hollins	Fr
LB	32	Eddie Heard Jr.	So
LB	33	Tyson Coleman	Jr
LB	34	Rahim Cassell	Jr
LB	35	Joe Walker	Jr
DB	37	Michael Manns	So
LB	38	Mike Garrity	Sr
LB	40	Brett Bafaro	So
DL	42	Cody Carriger	So
DB	43	Bronson Yim	Jr
DL	44	DeForest Buckner	Jr
DE	45	T.J. Daniel	So
LB	46	Danny Mattingly	Fr
LB	48	Rodney Hardrick	Jr
DL	50	Austin Maloata	Fr
LB	51	Isaac Ava	Sr
LB	52	Ivan Faulhaber	Fr
DL	55	Tui Talia	Jr
DL	56	Alex Balducci	Jr
DE	57	Ryan McCandless	Jr
LB	59	Grant Thompson	Sr
DL	84	Stetzon Bair	Jr
LB	86	Torrodney Prevot	So
DE	91	Tony Washington	Sr
DE	92	Henry Mondeaux	Fr
DL	93	Jason Sloan	Fr
DL	94	Jonathan Kenion	Fr
DL	95	Spencer Stark	Fr
DE	96	Christian French	Jr
DL	97	Jalen Jelks	Fr
DL	98	Jordan Kurahara	Fr
DL	99	Sam Kemp	Jr

Special teams

Pos.	#	Name	Class
LS	36	Devin Melendez	Fr
P	38	Ian Wheeler	Fr
LS	39	Tanner Carew	Fr
PK	40	Jesse Kelly	Fr
PK	41	Aidan Schneider	Fr
PK	48	Eric & Alan Solis Solis	Sr
PK	49	Matt Wogan	So
LS	53	Connor Johnson	Fr

Head coach

- Mark Helfrich (2nd season)

Coordinators/assistant coaches

Offense

- Scott Frost – Offensive Coordinator & quarterbacks (2nd season)
- Steve Greatwood – Running game coordinator & offensive line (28th season)
- Gary Campbell – Running backs (32nd season)
- Matt Lubick – Passing Game Coordinator & wide receivers (2nd season)
- Tom Osbourne – Special Teams Coordinator & tight ends (14th season)
- Joe Bernardi – Offensive graduate assistant (1st season)
- Nate Costa – Offensive graduate assistant (3rd season)
- Matt Noyer – Offensive Intern (1st season)

Defense

- Don Pellum – Defensive Coordinator & inside linebackers (1st season)
- Ron Aiken – Defensive line (2nd season)
- Erik Chinander – Outside Linebackers (1st season)
- John Neal – Passing Game Coordinator & Secondary (12th season)
- Jim Radcliffe – Strength and conditioning (30th season)
- Cha'pelle Brown – Defensive graduate assistant (1st season)
- Mike Keldorf – Defensive graduate assistant (3rd season)
- Shawn Young – Defensive Intern (1st season)

Legend

- (C) Team captain
- (S) Suspended
- (I) Ineligible
- Injured
- Redshirt

Roster
Last update: 11:12, 12 August 2014 (UTC)

=== Depth chart ===
Defense

FS
Eric Dargan
Juwaan Williams

OLB	ILB	ILB	OLB
Tony Washington	Rodney Hardrick	Joe Walker	Tyson Coleman
Christian French	Danny Mattingly	Derrick Malone	Torrodney Prevot

SS
Reggie Daniels
Tyree Robinson

CB
Troy Hill
Chris Seisay

DE	NT	DE
Arik Armstead	Alex Balducci	DeForest Buckner
Sam Kamp	Sam Kamp	T. J. Daniel

CB
Chris Seisay
Dior Mathis

Offense

WR
Charles Nelson
Darren Carrington

WR
Byron Marshall or
Dwayne Stanford
Devon Allen

LT	LG	C	RG	RT
Jake Fisher	Doug Brenner	Hroniss Grasu	Cameron Hunt	Andre Yruretagoyena
Tyrell Crosby	Jake Pisarcik	Hamani Stevens	Doug Brenner	Matt Pierson

TE
Evan Baylis
Johnny Mundt

WR
Keanon Lowe
Darren Carrington

QB
Marcus Mariota
Jeff Lockie

RB
Royce Freeman or
Thomas Tyner
Kenny Bassett

Special teams
PK Aidan Schneider
PK Matt Wogan
P Ian Wheeler
P Matt Wogan
KR Charles Nelson
PR Charles Nelson
LS Tanner Carew
H Taylor Allie

== Game summaries ==
=== South Dakota ===
South Dakota at No. 3 Oregon – Game summary

Quarter	1	2	3	4	Total
South Dakota	3	10	0	0	13
No. 3 Oregon	21	20	7	14	62

at Autzen Stadium • Eugene, OR

- Date: Saturday, August 30, 2014
- Game time: 7:30 pm PST
- Game weather: Temperature: 66 °F (19 °C) • Wind: N/NW 13 • Weather: Mostly cloudy
- Game attendance: 57,388
- TV announcers (Pac-12 Network): Kevin Calabro, Glenn Parker, & Jill Savage
- http://pac-12.com/content/football-statistics

Game information

First quarter

- ORE – Dwayne Stanford 62-yard pass from Marcus Mariota (Taylor Alie run for two-point conversion)
- SD – Miles Bergner 47-yard field goal
- ORE – Byron Marshall 41-yard pass from Mariota (two-point conversion failed)
- ORE – Royce Freeman 1-yard run (Aiden Schneider kick)

Second quarter

- SD – Bergner 25-yard field goal
- ORE – Freeman 26-yard run (Schneider kick)
- ORE – Marshall 11-yard pass from Mariota (Schneider kick)
- SD – Trevor Bouma 3-yard run (Bergner kick)
- ORE – Mariota 1-yard run (Schneider PAT blocked)

Third quarter

- ORE – Charles Nelson 50-yard punt return (Schneider kick)

Fourth quarter

- ORE – Pharoah Brown 4-yard pass from Jeff Lockie (Schneider kick)
- ORE – Kenny Bassett 9-yard run (Schneider kick)

Top performers
Passing

- SD – Kevin Earl, 13–26, 136 yards
- ORE – Marcus Mariota, 14–20, 267 yards, 3 TD

Running

- SD – Trevor Bouma, 14 carries, 60 yards, 1 TD
- ORE – Royce Freeman, 10 carries, 75 yards, 2 TD

Receiving

- SD – Brandt Van Roekel, 3 receptions, 54 yards
- ORE – Byron Marshall, 8 receptions, 138 yards, 2 TD

Defense

- SD – Tyson Graham Jr., 8 total, 6 solo
- ORE – Erik Dargan and Reggie Daniels, 7 total, 4 solo

Kicking

- SD – Miles Bergner, 2/2 FG, 47 yard long, 1/1 XP
- ORE – Aidan Schneider, 6/7 XP

special teams

- SD – Eric Schufford Jr., 6 KR, 78 yards
- ORE – Charles Nelson, 1 PR, 50 yards, TD

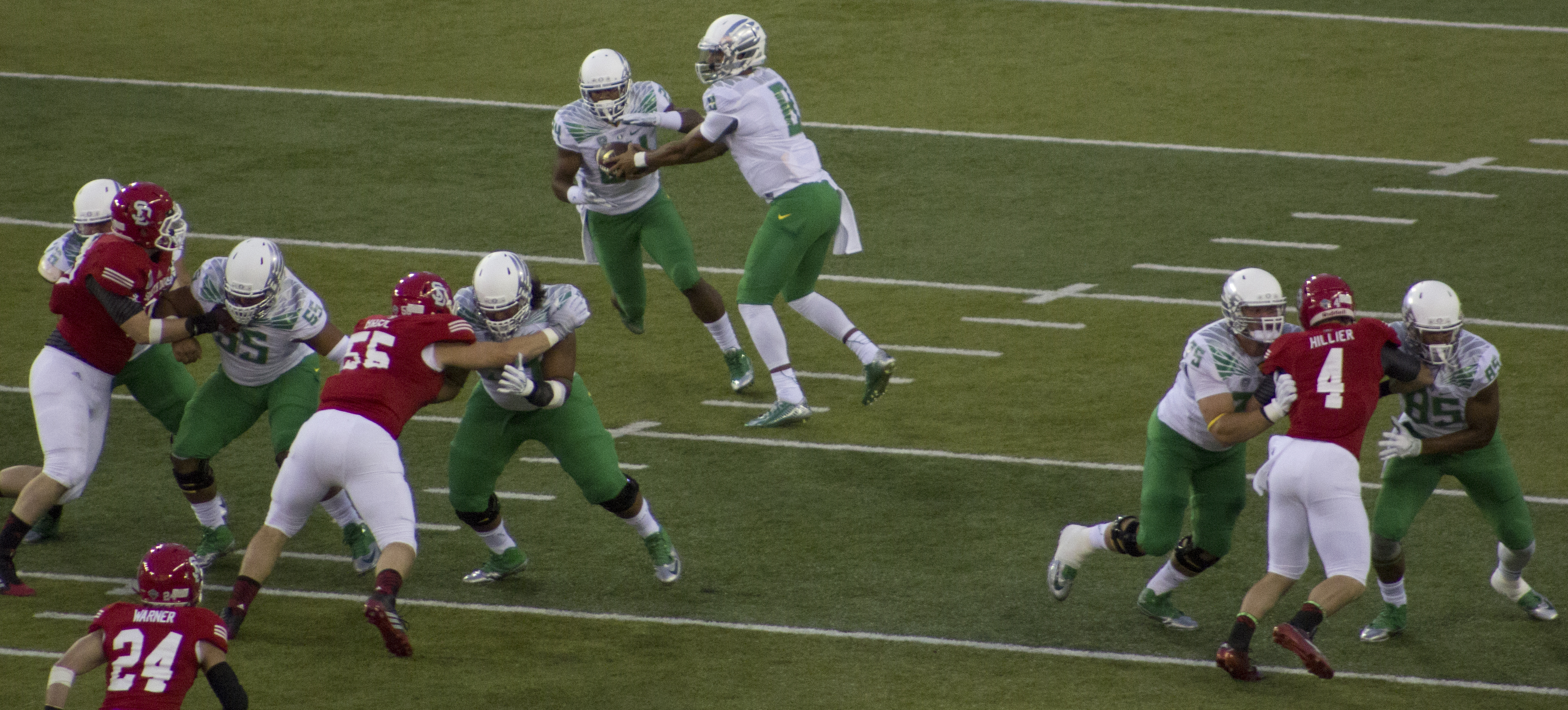
Marcus Mariota hands the ball off to Thomas Tyner.

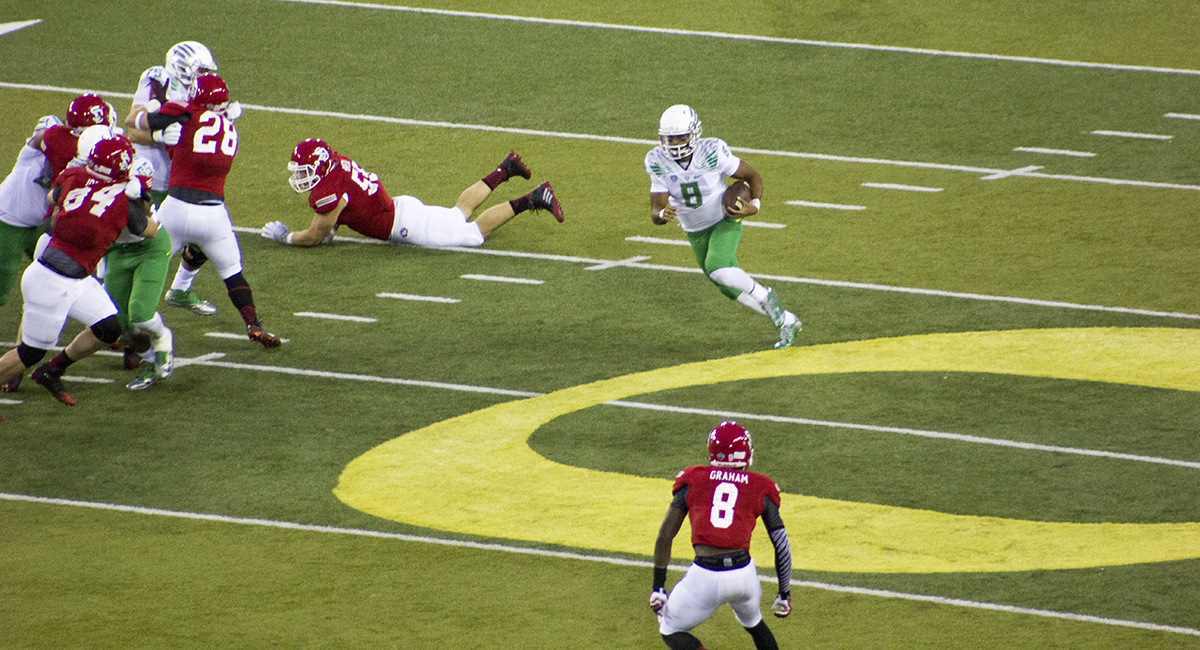
Marcus Mariota runs the ball.

In their home opener the Ducks defeated the South Dakota Coyotes 62–13 in their first ever meeting. To open the game the Ducks won the coin toss, elected to receive and marched down the field on a four-play, 74-yard drive lasting 94 seconds, which ended in a 62-yard touchdown pass from Marcus Mariota to Dwyane Stanford, followed by a successful two-point conversion run in by Taylor Alie. This touchdown was Mariota's 78th overall as a Duck, beating Joey Harrington for most career combined touchdowns. The Coyotes responded with a 4 and a half-minute drive which ended in a 47-yard field goal from Miles Bergner. On the next Oregon drive, the Ducks went 63 yards in three plays lasting just over a minute, culminating in a 41-yard touchdown pass from Mariota to Byron Marshall. A two-point conversion was attempted, but nullified due to an illegal formation penalty caused by too many players on the line of scrimmage, putting the game at 14–3. South Dakota was forced to punt on the next possession; the punt was downed at the Oregon 1-yard line, and pushed back an additional 6 yards due to an illegal blocking penalty. The Ducks responded with a 9-play, 97-yard drive finished off with true freshman Royce Freeman scoring his first touchdown as an Oregon Duck.

South Dakota retained possession from the end of the first quarter into the beginning of the second and would finish their drive with a punt, downed at the Oregon 29-yard line. Oregon couldn't get things going on their first possession of the second quarter and had a 3 and out on a negative running play from Thomas Tyner, two incomplete passes and a punt which was returned to the 50-yard line. South Dakota fought back and put together an 8 play, 42-yard drive culminating in a 25-yard field goal, putting the game at 21–6 with 9:26 left in the half. The Ducks returned the ensuing kick-off to their own 42 yard line and were in the end-zone 5 plays later after a 26-yard run from Freeman. Oregon then forced the Coyotes to punt, taking possession at their own 46 yard line. Byron Marshall started the drive off by breaking free on a 53-yard run, only to drop the ball in celebration on the 1 yard line, the ball went into the end-zone and then out of bounds, causing a touch-back, giving the Coyotes the ball at their own 20 yard line. Oregon's defense then forced the Coyotes to fumble, which Oregon defensive back Dior Mathis recovered. Oregon turned the fumble into points 5 plays later with a touchdown pass from Mariota to Marshall to put the game at 35–6. South Dakota's next drive would be their only drive resulting in a touchdown, they drove the ball 75-yards in 6 plays, finishing with a 3-yard run from Trevor Bouma. The Ducks then recorded the final scoring drive of the first half, going 76-yard on 10 plays, finishing with a 1-yard run from Mariota, only to have the point after attempt fail due to a bad snap. The teams went into the locker rooms at halftime with score at 41–13.

Ahead by 28 points and moving the ball at will, the Ducks played many of their backups in the second half. South Dakota was shut out for the entire second half, with Oregon's second string putting together three touchdown drives: a 50-yard punt return by Charles Nelson, a 4-yard touchdown pass from Jeff Lockie to Pharaoh Brown and 9-yard run from Kenny Bassett. While they did not score, South Dakota did close out the fourth quarter with a 69-yard, 17-play drive lasting just over 9 minutes that at one point was on the Oregon 2-yard line, but ended in a turnover on downs, leaving the final score at 62–13.

In the game, Mariota passed for three touchdowns and 267 yards, leaving him tied with Darron Thomas for career passing touchdowns (66) and 22 yards away from breaking Bill Musgrave's record for career total offense (8,140 yards).

=== Michigan State ===
#7 Michigan State at #3 Oregon – Game summary

Quarter	1	2	3	4	Total
#7 Michigan State	0	24	3	0	27
#3 Oregon	8	10	14	14	46

at Autzen Stadium • Eugene, OR

- Date: Saturday, September 6th, 2014
- Game time: 3:30 pm PST
- Game weather: Temperature: 91 °F (33 °C) • Wind: Calm • Weather: Sunny
- Game attendance:
- Referee: Referee: Michael Cannon (Big Ten)
- TV announcers (FOX): Gus Johnson, Charles Davis, & Molly McGrath
- http://pac-12.com/content/football-statistics

Game information

First quarter

- ORE – Thomas Tyner 1-yard run (Taylor Alie pass to DeForest Buckner for Two-Point Conversion)

Second quarter

- ORE – Matt Wogan 28-yard field goal
- MSU – Jeremy Langford 16-yard run (Michael Geiger Kick)
- ORE – Devon Allen 70-yard pass from Marcus Mariota (Wogan Kick)
- MSU – Geiger 2-yard field goal
- MSU – Tony Lippett 7-yard pass from Connor Cook (Geiger Kick)
- MSU – Josiah Price 7-yard pass from Connor Cook (Geiger Kick)

Third quarter

- MSU – Gieger 42-yard field goal
- ORE – Allen 24-yard pass from Mariota (Wogan Kick)
- ORE – Keanon Lowe 37-yard pass from Mariota (Wogan kick)

Fourth quarter

- ORE – Royce Freeman 38-yard run (Wogan Kick)
- ORE – Freeman 14-yard run (Wogan Kick)

Top Performers
Passing

- MSU – Connor Cook, 29/47, 343 yards, 2 TD, 2 INT
- ORE – Marcus Mariota, 17/28, 318 yards, 3 TD

Running

- MSU – Jeremy Langford, 24 carries, 86 yards, 1 TD
- ORE – Royce Freeman, 13 carries, 89 yards, 2 TD

Receiving

- MSU – Tony Lippett, 11 receptions, 133 yards, 1 TD
- ORE – Devon Allen, 3 receptions, 110 yards, 2 TD

Defense

- MSU –
- ORE –

Kicking

- MSU – Michael Geiger, 2/2 FG, 42 yard long, 3/3 XP
- ORE – Matt Wogan, 1/1 FG, 28 yard long, 5/5 XP

special teams

- MSU – R.J. Shelton, 5 KR, 121 yards
- ORE – Devon Allen, 3 KR, 69 yards

In the first game between non-conference top ten teams in the history of Autzen Stadium, Oregon defeated the seventh ranked Michigan State Spartans 46–27. The Spartans won the coin toss and elected to receive, leading off a series of back and forth punts for the first nine minutes of play. While driving down the field during their third possession of the game, Michigan State quarterback Connor Cook was intercepted at the Oregon 38 yard line by Erik Dargan. Oregon turned the interception into points two minutes later off of a hard driven 1-yard run by Thomas Tyner, followed by a two-point conversion pass from Taylor Alie to DeForest Buckner. Michigan State would punt the ball on their next possession, closing out the first quarter with Oregon leading 8–0.

Oregon finished their first possession of the second quarter with a 28-yard field goal from Matt Wogan to put the game at 11–0, but the remainder of the quarter would belong to Michigan State. The Spartans would go on a 24–7 run, scoring points on all four of their second quarter possessions. While the Spartan defense did allow a 70-yard touchdown pass from Marcus Mariota to track star Devon Allen early in the quarter, they forced the Ducks to punt the ball twice in as many possessions, while also getting two quarterback sacks. Going into half time with the score at 24–18 and the Ducks on the ropes, the Spartans looked to be on their way to victory.

Oregon stumbled out of the gate and was forced to punt from their own end zone to start the half, with Michigan State scoring a field goal not long after. However, the rest of the second half would belong to the Ducks, with a commanding defensive performance, Michigan State would not score another point the rest of the game. After the Michigan State field goal, the Ducks and Spartans traded punts, with the Ducks offense looking overwhelmed with the fierce defensive line play from the reigning Big Ten Champions. On their next drive however, Marcus Mariota took over the game for his team, and led the Ducks to scoring drives on their next three possessions.

Going into the fourth quarter, the tables had turned on Michigan State, with the Ducks leading the game 39–27. The stout Duck defense would force a turnover on downs deep in their own territory, but on the ensuing possession Oregon was again forced to punt the ball away, giving Michigan State the ball, down 12 points with nine minutes left to play. The Oregon defense again showed their talent by intercepting Connor Cook again, giving their offense back the ball to close out the game. The Oregon offense then methodically drove the 96 yards in six and a half minutes, converting two third downs and scoring a touchdown on fourth down to all but finish the game at 46–27. The victory improved Oregon's all-time record against the Spartans to 3–2.

During the game Marcus Mariota threw for 3 touchdown passes, improving his career total to 69, breaking the Oregon record previously held by his predecessor Darron Thomas. Mariota also broke the team record for total-offense, previously held by Bill Musgrave. His 318 passing yards extended his career total to 6,297, passing Joey Harrington for fourth in the Oregon record books.

=== Wyoming ===
Wyoming at #2 Oregon – Game summary

Quarter	1	2	3	4	Total
Wyoming	7	0	0	7	14
#2 Oregon	0	27	14	7	48

at Autzen Stadium • Eugene, OR

- Date: Saturday, September 13th, 2014
- Game time: 11:00 am PST
- Game weather: Temperature: 85 °F (29 °C) • Wind: Calm • Weather: Sunny
- Game attendance: 56,533
- TV announcers (Pac-12 Network): Roxy Bernstein, Glenn Parker, & Jill Savage
- https://www.espn.com/college-football/boxscore?gameId=400548193

Game information

First quarter

- WYO – Tanner Gentry 18-yard pass from Colby Kirkegaard (Stuart Williams Kick)

Second quarter

- ORE – Marcus Mariota 15-yard run (Matt Wogan Kick)
- ORE – Byron Marshall 30-yard run (Wogan PAT Failed)
- ORE – Mariota 19-yard run (Wogan Kick)
- ORE – Devon Allen 16-yard pass from Mariota (Wogan Kick)

Third quarter

- ORE – Royce Freeman 12-yard run (Wogan Kick)
- ORE – Johnathan Loyd 5-yard pass from Mariota (Wogan Kick)

Fourth quarter

- WYO – D.J. May 12-yard pass from Kirkegaard (Williams Kick)
- ORE – Kani Benoit 1-yard run (Wogan Kick)

Top Performers
Passing

- WYO – Colby Kirkegaard, 19/33, 284 yards, 2 TD, 2 INT
- ORE – Marcus Mariota, 19/23, 221 yards, 2 TD

Running

- WYO – Shaun Wick, 16 carries, 122 yards
- ORE – Byron Marshall, 6 carries, 80 yards, 1 TD

Receiving

- WYO – D.J. May, 4 receptions, 101 yards, 1 TD
- ORE – Pharoah Brown, 4 receptions, 46 yards

Defense

- WYO –
- ORE – Erick Dargan, 2 INT

Kicking

- WYO – Stuart Williams, 2/2 XP
- ORE – Matt Wogan, 6/7 XP

special teams

- WYO – Jalen Claiborne, 5 KR, 83 yards
- ORE – Charles Nelson, 2 KR, 46 yards, 1 PR, -2 yards

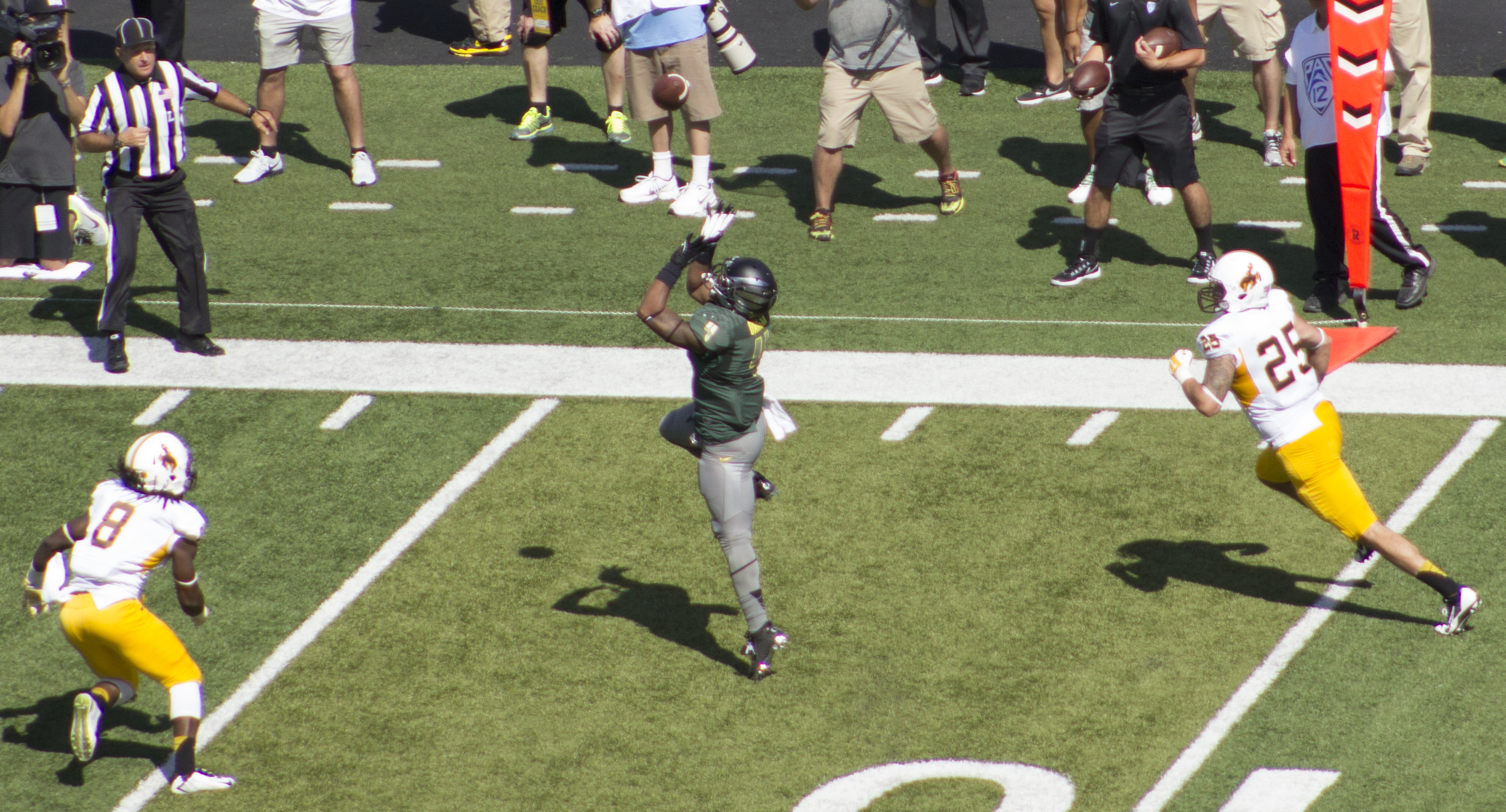
Erick Dargan makes his first of five interceptions on the year.

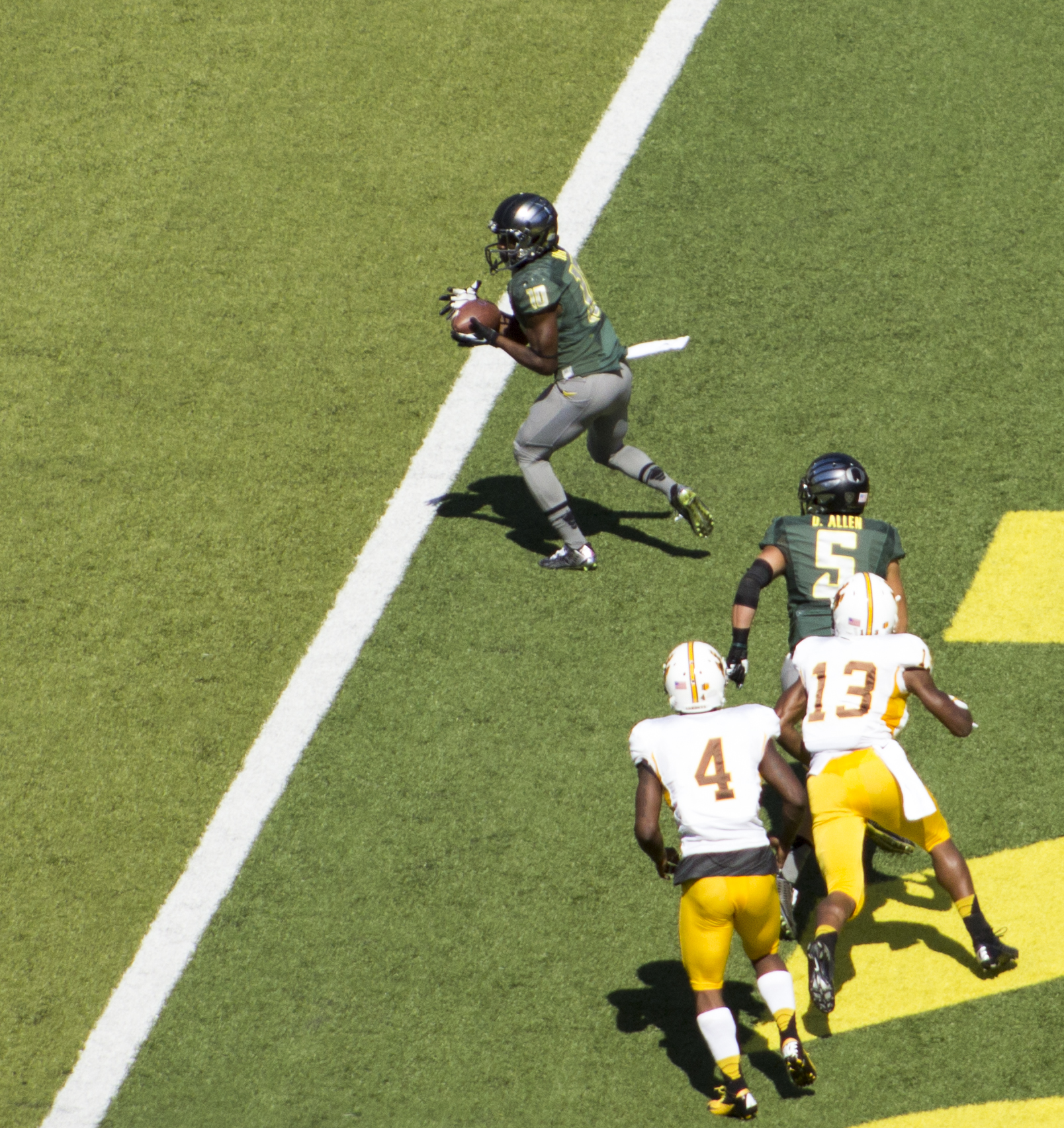
Johnathan Loyd, Oregon's winningest men's basketball player, catches his first touchdown pass as an Oregon football player.

In their final non-conference game of the regular season the Ducks defeated the Wyoming Cowboys in their first meeting. The Cowboys won the coin toss and elected to receive the first kickoff of the game, Wyoming and Oregon traded punts for their first drives. The Cowboys scored on their second possession, an eleven play, 98-yard drive culminating in an 18-yard touchdown pass from Colby Kirkegaard to Tanner Gentry; the Ducks would not score in the first quarter. Going into the second quarter with the ball and the score 7–0 in favor of Wyoming, the Ducks responded to the Cowboys with four unanswered touchdown drives, scoring on 15 and 19 yard runs from Marcus Mariota, a 30-yard run by Byron Marshall and a 16-yard pass from Mariota to Devon Allen. Erick Dargan would intercept Wyoming quarterback Colby Kirkegaard twice during the second quarter, with Oregon turning both interceptions into touchdowns. On the touchdown run by Marshall the Ducks failed to convert the PAT, the teams went to the locker rooms at half-time with the score at 27–7 in favor of the Ducks.

The Ducks continued to put up points, scoring on their first possession of the second half from a 12-yard run by Royce Freeman. For Wyoming's first possession of the second half they turned the ball over after four plays, with Kirkegaard being strip-sacked by Torrodney Prevot, the ball recovered by Christian French. The Ducks again turned a turnover into a touchdown, with Mariota throwing a 5-yard touchdown pass to Johnathan Loyd, his first touchdown as an Oregon Duck football player, to go with his 538 points, 167 rebounds, 368 assists and 118 steals as Oregon's winningest men's basketball player. Wyoming scored in the early minutes of the fourth quarter, bringing the score to 41–14. For the rest of the game the Ducks played most of their backups, and would trade long drives with the Cowboys to run out the clock. Oregon took advantage of their final possession with Kani Benoit running in a 1-yard touchdown to finish off a 15 play, 79-yard drive lasting five and a half minutes. The Cowboys tried to score on their final possession, a 14 play drive going 55-yards and lasting nearly seven minutes, however the Duck defense forced a turnover on downs with ninety seconds to go.

During the game Oregon's offensive line continued to be hampered by the injury bug with left tackle Jake Fisher appearing to suffer a high-ankle sprain, along with the loss of Andre Yruretagoyena during the previous week's win over Michigan State, the Ducks will be forced to start backups at both right and left tackle until both men are healthy.

=== Washington State ===
#2 Oregon at Washington State – Game summary

Quarter	1	2	3	4	Total
#2 Oregon	7	14	7	10	38
Washington State	14	7	0	10	31

at Martin Stadium • Pullman, WA

- Date: Saturday, September 20th, 2014
- Game time: 7:30 pm PST
- Game weather: Temperature: 71 °F (22 °C) • Wind: Calm • Weather: Clear
- Game attendance: 32,952
- TV announcers (ESPN): Mark Jones, Rod Gilmore, & Shelley Smith
- http://pac-12.com/content/football-statistics

Game information

First quarter

- WSU – Dom Williams 18-yard pass from Connor Halliday (Quentin Breshears Kick)
- ORE – Devon Allen 80-yard pass from Marcus Mariota (Matt Wogan Kick)
- WSU – Williams 8-yard pass from Halliday (Breshears Kick)

Second quarter

- ORE – Keanon Lowe 57-yard pass from Mariota (Wogan Kick)
- ORE – Allen 13-yard pass from Mariota (Wogan Kick)
- WSU – Rickey Galvin 6-yard pass from Halliday (Breshears Kick)

Third quarter

- ORE – Pharoah Brown 8-yard pass from Mariota (Wogan Kick)

Fourth quarter

- WSU – Breshears 30-yard Field Goal
- ORE – Wogan 34-yard Field Goal
- WSU – River Cracraft 5-yard pass from Halliday (Breshears Kick)
- ORE – Lowe 6-yard pass from Mariota (Wogan Kick)

Top Performers
Passing

- ORE – Marcus Mariota, 21-25, 329 yards, 5 TD
- WSU – Connor Halliday, 43-63, 436 yards, 4 TD

Running

- ORE – Royce Freeman, 20 carries, 75 yards
- WSU – Gerard Wicks, 7 carries, 36 yards

Receiving

- ORE – Devon Allen, 7 receptions, 142 yards, 2 TD
- WSU – River Cracraft, 8 receptions, 107 yards, 1 TD

Defense

- ORE –
- WSU –

Kicking

- ORE – Matt Wogan, 1/2 FG, 34 yard long, 5/5 XP
- WSU – Quentin Breshears, 1/2 FG, 30 yard long, 4/4 XP

special teams

- ORE – Thomas Tyner, 4 KR, 80 yards
- WSU – Jamal Morrow, 3 KR, 65 yards

In their first conference game of the 2014 season the Ducks narrowly defeated the Washington State Cougars in Pullman, 38–31. Washington State won the coin toss, elected to receive and were forced into a three-and-out on their first drive. The Ducks came out of the gate sloppily, punting on their first drive gaining negative yardage and allowing Marcus Mariota to be sacked. The rest of the first half was a story of the Cougars scoring after long drives, often doing so by making the Oregon defense look terrible against the pass in the process, and Oregon responding with one or two play scoring drives, often taking less than one minute to complete. By the end of the half the score was tied at 21, with time of possession heavily skewed in the Cougars favor nearly two to one. Washington State appeared to be succeeding at a tried and true method of defeating the Ducks: sustaining long offensive drives and achieving crippling penetration of the offensive line. With backups at left and right tackle, Marcus Mariota had been sacked five times in the first half.

The story of the second half would be markedly different, with the Ducks having made several adjustments on both sides of the ball. Marcus Mariota was now holding the ball for a significantly shorter period of time in the pocket, often only reading two receivers before running out of the pocket or throwing the ball away. This allowed the Ducks to sustain drives going forward and would lead to the Ducks having the edge in time of possession in the second half (nearly two to one, this time in their favor). On defense, the Cougars were still able to go down the field with relative ease, however the Oregon defense forced several turnovers and field goals, shutting out the Cougars in the third quarter, and only allowing one touchdown for the rest of the game. In the third quarter both teams missed relatively short field goals, though Oregon scored on a pass from Mariota to Pharaoh Brown following a Washington State fumble, forced by DeForest Buckner.

Going into the fourth quarter ahead 28–21, the Ducks were still very much fighting to maintain ahead of the Cougars. The quarter began with a 30-yard field goal made by Washington State, only to be responded to by a 34-yard field goal from the Ducks. Washington State then drove the length of the field and scored, tying the game again, at 31. Oregon responded with the final scoring drive of the game with a touchdown pass from Mariota to Keanon Lowe, putting the Ducks up by a touchdown with 5:33 to go in the game. After two completions by the Cougars the Oregon defense bowed their necks, not allowing another play of positive yardage, and sacking the Cougars quarterback Connor Halliday on fourth down, giving the Oregon offense the ball, with the lead, and 3:34 on the clock. The Ducks then ran out the clock, and returned home with a hard-fought win, and serious questions about their offensive line, and defensive secondary.

By the end of the game much could be said about the quarterback play by both teams, with a combined completion rate over 70%, 765 passing yards, nine touchdowns and zero interceptions. However, the star of the game was Marcus Mariota, completing 21 of 25 passes attempted, for an 84% completion rating, to go with 329 yards through the air and 58 on the ground, and five touchdown passes.

The Ducks extended their lead in the series to 49-36-7 (.571), as well as continuing their current win streak to eight consecutive years. They would travel home facing a bye week in which to work on inconsistencies and heal followed by a Thursday night game against the Arizona Wildcats, a team they lost to in 2013.

=== Arizona ===
Arizona at #2 Oregon – Game summary

Quarter	1	2	3	4	Total
Arizona	3	0	21	7	31
#2 Oregon	0	7	7	10	24

at Autzen Stadium • Eugene, OR

- Date: Thursday, October 2, 2014
- Game time: 7:30 pm PST
- Game weather: Temperature: 62 °F (17 °C) • Wind: N 9 • Weather: Partly cloudy
- Game attendance: 56,032
- Referee: Referee: Chris Coyte
- TV announcers (ESPN): Rece Davis, Jesse Palmer, David Pollack, and Samantha Ponder
- http://pac-12.com/content/football-statistics

Game information

First quarter

- ARI – Casey Skowron 28-yard field goal

Second quarter

- ORE – Marcus Mariota 26-yard pass from Royce Freeman (Matt Wogan Kick)

Third quarter

- ARI – Nick Wilson 3-yard run (Skowron Kick)
- ORE – Devon Allen 6-yard pass from Mariota (Wogan Kick)
- ARI – Nick Wilson 2-yard run (Casey Skowron Kick)
- ARI – Nick Wilson 34-yard pass from Anu Solomon (Skowron Kick)

Fourth quarter

- ORE – Wogan 21-yard field goal
- ORE – Keanon Lowe 9-yard pass from Mariota (Wogan Kick)
- ARI – Terris Jones-Grigsby 1-yard run (Skowron Kick)

Top performers
Passing

- ARI – Anu Solomon, 20-31, 287 yards, TD, INT
- ORE – Marcus Mariota, 20-32, 276 yards, 2 TD

Rushing

- ARI – Terris Jones-Grigsby, 27 carries, 115 yards, TD
- ORE – Royce Freeman, 19 carries, 85 yards

Receiving

- ARI – Terris Jones-Grigsby, 4 receptions, 95 yards
- ORE – Devon Allen, 5 receptions, 78 yards, TD

Defense

- ARI –
- ORE –

Kicking

- ARI – Casey Skowron, 1/1 FG, 28 yard long, 4/4 XP
- ORE – Matt Wogan, 1/1 FG, 21 yard long, 3/3 XP

special teams

- ARI – Tyrell Johnson, 4 KR, 99 yards
- ORE – Charles Nelson, 4 KR, 71 yards

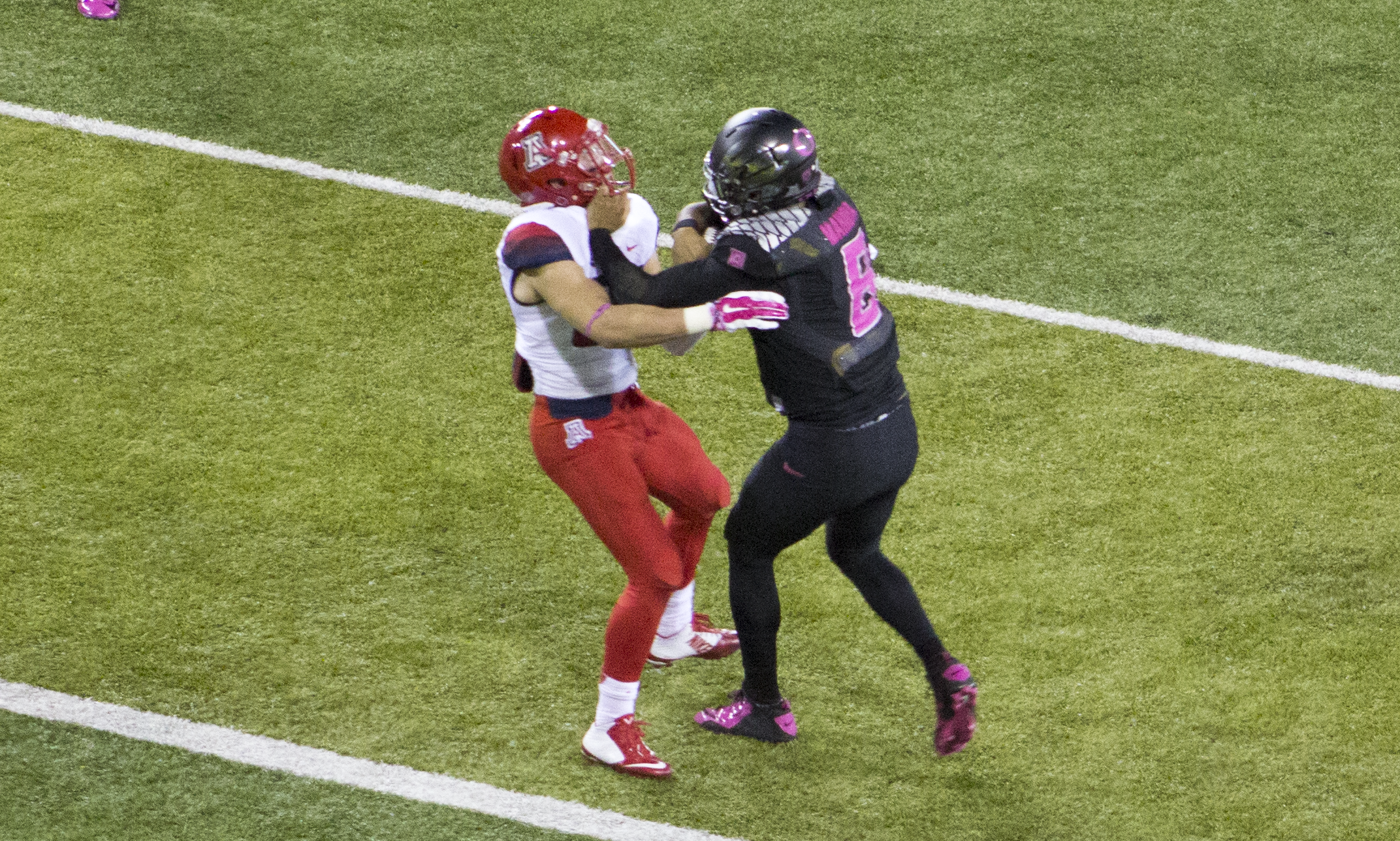
Marcus Mariota stiff-arms a defender while scoring a receiving touchdown.

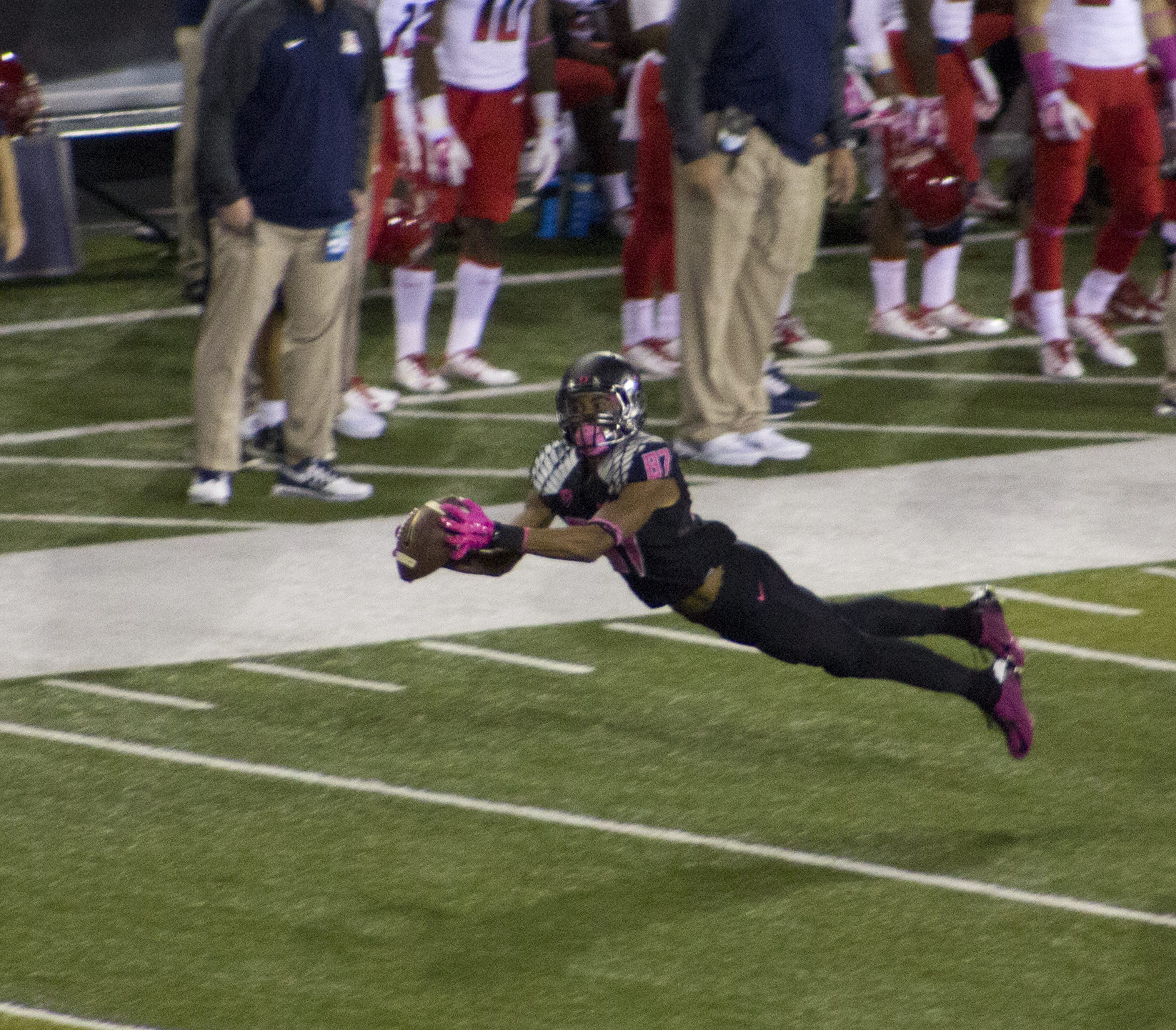
Darren Carrington catches a pass.

In a week that saw 11 of the top 25 teams, including five of the top eight, all undefeated, be upset in conference play, the Ducks were upset for the second straight year by the Arizona Wildcats in the 100th consecutive sell-out of Autzen Stadium. The Ducks won the coin toss, elected to receive and were eventually forced to turn the ball over on downs, after having converted a fourth down earlier in their opening drive. The Wildcats capitalized on their opening drive by scoring a 28-yard field goal. The Oregon offense then recorded a three-and-out, but got the ball back after Reggie Daniels intercepted Anu Solomon on third down. The Ducks and Wildcats then traded punts, with Oregon maintaining possession going into the second quarter with the score at 3–0 in favor of Arizona.

On the second play of the second quarter the Ducks scored on a trick play with running back Royce Freeman lobbing a 26-yard touchdown pass to quarterback Marcus Mariota, his second receiving touchdown as a Duck. The two teams again traded punts, and then traded fumbles, keeping the score at 7–3 going into halftime.

Coming out the locker rooms after halftime the Wildcats scored on a 3-yard run by Nick Wilson. Oregon responded following a 72-yard drive capped off with a 6-yard touchdown pass from Mariota to Devon Allen. Arizona continued to pressure Oregon offensively, and scored on a 2-yard run by Nick Wilson, regaining the lead with a score of 17–14. The Wildcats then forced a three-and-out by the Ducks and scored again, on a 34-yard pass from Solomon to Wilson, extending their lead to 24–14.

The Ducks maintained possession going into the fourth quarter with a ten-point deficit to make up. They finished their drive with a 21-yard field goal by Matt Wogan, putting the score at 24–17 in favor of Arizona. The Oregon defense then forced a turnover on downs, giving the ball back to their offense, which scored a touchdown on a 9-yard pass from Mariota to Keanon Lowe, evening the score at 24. The Wildcats then drove 71 yards in five and a half minutes, scoring on a 1-yard run by Terris Jones-Grigsby. The Ducks, with just under three minutes to play, were driving quickly down the field, converting two first downs, only to be stopped by a strip sack of Mariota by Scooby Wright III. The Wildcats then ran out the clock, sealing their second victory over the Ducks in as many years.

The Ducks maintained their lead in the all-time series, 24–16 (.600); however, every victory earned by the Wildcats since 2007 has been a major upset of the Ducks with each win coming over an Oregon team ranked in the top ten at the time of the game (2007 #2; 2013 #10; 2014 #2). The main storyline following the game continued to be the Ducks' beleaguered offensive line, allowing Mariota to be sacked five times during the game, and unable to effectively run-block or fight back against a three-man pass rush.

During the game, the Ducks wore uniforms with pink numbers and highlights in recognition of Breast Cancer Awareness Month and to raise money for the Kay Yow Cancer Fund. Additionally, during the playing of the National Anthem the Oregon Marching Band paid tribute to a former trumpet player who lost a battle with cancer during the summer.

=== UCLA ===
#12 Oregon at #18 UCLA – Game summary

Quarter	1	2	3	4	Total
#12 Oregon	8	13	14	7	42
#18 UCLA	0	10	0	20	30

at Rose Bowl • Pasadena, CA

- Date: Saturday, October 11th, 2014
- Game time: 12:30 pm PST
- Game weather: Temperature: 79 °F (26 °C) • Wind: 6 S • Weather: Clear
- Game attendance: 80,139
- TV announcers (FOX): Gus Johnson, Charles Davis, & Molly McGrath

Game information

First quarter

- ORE – Marcus Mariota 13-yard run (Taylor Alie Run for Two-Point Conversion)

Second quarter

- UCLA – Ka'imi Fairbairn 20-yard field goal
- ORE – Thomas Tyner 21-yard pass from Mariota (Matt Wogan Kick)
- ORE – Pharaoh Brown 31-yard pass from Mariota (Wogan Kick Missed)
- UCLA – Brett Hundley 16-yard run (Fairbairn Kick)

Third quarter

- ORE – Mariota 23-yard run (Wogan Kick)
- ORE – Royce Freeman 4-yard run (Wogan Kick)

Fourth quarter

- ORE – Freeman 2-yard run (Wogan Kick)
- UCLA – Jordan Payton 5-yard pass from Hundley (Miles Jack Run for Two-Point Conversion)
- UCLA – Nate Starks 9-yard run (Two-Point Attempt Failed)
- UCLA – Payton 25-yard pass from Hundley (Two-Point Attempt Failed)

Top Performers
Passing

- ORE – Marcus Mariota, 17/27, 210 yards, 2 TD
- UCLA – Brett Hundley, 26/37, 216 yards, 2 TD, INT

Running

- ORE – Royce Freeman, 18 carries, 121 yards, 2 TD
- UCLA – Paul Perkins, 21 carries, 187 yards

Receiving

- ORE – Pharoah Brown, 5 receptions, 84 yards, TD
- UCLA – Jordan Payton, 6 receptions, 61 yards, 2 TD

Defense

- ORE –
- UCLA –

Kicking

- ORE – Matt Wogan, 4/5 XP
- UCLA – Ka'imi Fairbairn, 1/2 FG, 20 yard long, 1/1 XP

special teams

- ORE – Charles Nelson, 3 KR, 58 yards, 1 PR, 1 yard
- UCLA – Ishmael Adams, 3 KR, 45 yards

In their sixth game of the season the twelfth-ranked Ducks defeated the eighteenth-ranked UCLA Bruins at the Rose Bowl in Los Angeles, CA. With both teams coming off of stinging defeats at home by conference opponents, the game was billed to be a slugfest, with both teams fighting for their season. The expectation proved to be far from the reality that ensued.

To start the game both teams traded punts, seemingly still on edge because of their performances from the previous week. Oregon eventually struck first, scoring on a 13-yard run by Marcus Mariota after UCLA's Brett Hundley was strip sacked by Tony Washington. The Ducks converted a two-point attempt making the score 8–0 in their favor. The Bruins responded by driving the ball 70 yards in almost 8 minutes that spanned the rest of the first quarter into the second quarter to their own two-yard line; however, they were unable to punch it through a stout Duck defense and were forced to kick a field goal, making the score 8–3.

After returning the kickoff following the field goal, the Oregon offense proved to be back in true form, driving the ball 72 yards and scoring on a 21-yard pass from Mariota to Thomas Tyner putting the score at 15–3 with just under 10 minutes to go in the second quarter. UCLA responded to their increasing deficit by quickly driving the length of the field, converting three consecutive first downs, only to be stopped again in the red zone, this time missing the field goal. The Ducks would respond by scoring again, this time on a 31-yard pass from Mariota to Pharaoh Brown, they would miss the PAT, making the score 21–3 with three minutes to go until half-time. The Bruins made the most of their time by scoring on an 84-yard drive, leaving the Ducks with just three seconds on the clock with the score at 21–10. Oregon ran out the three seconds and went into half-time with the lead.

UCLA received the ball to begin the second half; after gaining 23 yards they were forced to punt back to Oregon. The Ducks again completed a long drive down the field, this time 80 yards, ending a play that made Marcus Mariota looking more like a point-guard than a quarterback. From their opponent's three-yard line the Ducks ran their staple zone-read play, this time Mariota kept the ball, attempting to run it in for a score. He was tripped on his way to end-zone, dropped the football only to have it bounce back into his hands, causing a defender to freeze just long enough for Mariota to find the end-zone for another score, making the score 28–10 in their favor. The Oregon offense didn't have to wait long to get back on the field after their scoring drive as UCLA's Brett Hundley was intercepted by All-American cornerback Ifo Ekpre-Olomu on their second play of the drive. The Ducks would score two plays later on a 4-yard run by Royce Freeman making the score 35–10. UCLA got the ball back and traded punts with Oregon, with the Ducks maintaining possession going into the fourth quarter, ahead by 25.

The Ducks scored again early in the fourth quarter on another Royce Freeman run, this time from just two yards out making the score 42–10. UCLA responded with a 93-yard drive ending a touchdown complete with a two-point conversion, reducing their deficit to 42–18 with just under ten minuted to go. The Ducks put in their second string and tried to run out the clock, however UCLA forced a punt and almost succeeded in achieving what would have been one of the greatest comebacks in school history. With eight minutes left in the game, the Bruins drove 67 yards in three minutes, scored a touchdown and missed two-point attempt making the score 42–24 with 4:21 left to play. The Bruins then recovered an onside kick and again completed a quick scoring drive, missing the two-point attempt to make the score 42–30 with 2:47 to go. The Bruins were unable to recover their next onside kick and with their time outs exhausted by the previous drives they were unable to stop the Ducks from running out the clock, leaving the final score 42–30.

Even though they lost, UCLA maintained their lead in the overall series, 39-28 (.582), however Oregon maintains a seven-year win streak (the two teams did not play in 2011).

=== Washington ===
Washington at #9 Oregon – Game summary

Quarter	1	2	3	4	Total
Washington	6	0	7	7	20
#9 Oregon	7	21	7	10	45

at Autzen Stadium • Eugene, OR

- Date: Saturday, October 18th, 2014
- Game time: 5:00 pm PST
- Game weather: Temperature: • Wind: • Weather:
- Game attendance: 57,858
- Referee: Referee: Mark Duddy
- TV announcers (Fox Sports 1): Joe Davis, Joey Harrington, & Kris Budden

Game information

First quarter

- WASH – Cameron Van Winkle 33-yard field goal
- ORE – Royce Freeman 37-yard run (Matt Wogan Kick)
- WASH – Van Winkle 40-yard field goal

Second quarter

- ORE – Freeman 3-yard run (Wogan Kick)
- ORE – Freeman 1-yard run (Wogan Kick)
- ORE – Byron Marshall 23-yard pass from Marcus Mariota (Wogan Kick)

Third quarter

- ORE – Dwayne Stanford 16-yard pass from Mariota (Wogan Kick)
- WASH – Deontae Cooper 3-yard pass from Cyler Miles (Van Winkle Kick)

Fourth quarter

- ORE – Freeman 3-yard run (Wogan Kick)
- WASH – Troy Williams 7-yard run (Van Winkle Kick)
- ORE – Wogan 26-yard field goal

Top Performers
Passing

- WASH – Cyler Miles, 19/28, 147 yards, TD, INT
- ORE – Marcus Mariota, 24/33, 336 yards, 2 TD

Running

- WASH – John Ross, 2 carries, 44 yards
- ORE – Royce Freeman, 29 carries, 169 yards, 4 TD

Receiving

- WASH – Deontae Cooper, 6 receptions, 48 yards, TD
- ORE – Pharaoh Brown, 3 receptions, 99 yards

Defense

- WASH –
- ORE –

Kicking

- WASH – Cameron Van Winkle, 2/2 FG, 40-yard long, 2/2 XP
- ORE – Matt Wogan, 1/2 FG, 26-yard long, 6/6 XP

special teams

- WASH – John Ross, 3 KR, 60 yards
- ORE – Charles Nelson, 2 KR, 38 yards, 1 PR, 1 yard

In their annual rivalry game, Oregon defeated the Washington Huskies in Eugene for the eleventh consecutive year, winning each game by at least a margin of 17 points, however, the Huskies still lead the all-time series 58-45-5 (.560).

In winning their sixth game of the season the Ducks became bowl eligible for the tenth consecutive year, tied for tenth in longest active consecutive bowl appearances. The Ducks have played in a bowl game 19 times since the 1989 season with a record of 9-10 (.474), having missed the postseason only four times (1991, 1993, 1996 & 2004).

=== California ===
#6 Oregon at California – Game summary

Quarter	1	2	3	4	Total
#6 Oregon	14	24	14	7	59
California	14	14	7	6	41

at Levi's Stadium • Santa Clara, CA

- Date: Saturday, October 24th, 2014
- Game time: 7:00 pm PST
- Game weather: Temperature: 65 °F (18 °C) • Wind: 2 S • Weather: Clear
- Game attendance: 55,575
- Referee: Referee: Jack Folliard
- TV announcers (Fox Sports 1): Tim Brando, Joel Klatt, & Mike Pereira

Game information

First quarter

- CAL – Luke Rubenzer 12-yard run (James Langford Kick)
- ORE – Dwayne Stanford 22-yard pass from Marcus Mariota (Aiden Schneider Kick)
- CAL – Vic Enwere 19-yard run (Langford Kick)
- ORE – Royce Freeman 4-yard run (Schneider Kick)

Second quarter

- ORE – Schneider 23-yard field goal
- ORE – Pharaoh Brown 9-yard pass from Mariota (Schneider Kick)
- ORE – Charles Nelson 58-yard punt return (Schneider Kick)
- CAL – Stephen Anderson 11-yard pass from Jared Goff (Langford Kick)
- CAL – Daniel Lasco 1-yard run (Langford Kick)
- ORE – Stanford 24-yard pass from Mariota (Schneider Kick)

Third quarter

- ORE – Byron Marshall 54-yard pass from Mariota (Schneider Kick)
- ORE – Freeman 2-yard run (Schneider Kick)
- CAL – Maurice Harris 5-yard pass from Goff (Langford Kick)

Fourth quarter

- ORE – Brown 21-yard pass from Mariota (Schneider Kick)
- CAL – Luke Rubenzer 2-yard run (Two-Point Attempt Failed)

Top Performers
Passing

- ORE – Marcus Mariota, 18/30, 326 yards, 5 TD, INT
- CAL – Jared Goff, 32/52, 360 yards, 2 TD

Running

- ORE – Royce Freeman, 22 carries, 112 yards, 2 TD
- CAL – Daniel Lasco, 15 carried, 85 yards, TD

Receiving

- ORE – Byron Marshall, 4 receptions, 133 yards, TD
- CAL – Daniel Lasco, 8 receptions, 101 yards

Defense

- ORE – Erick Dargan, 11 tackles
- CAL –

Kicking

- ORE – Aidan Schneider, 1/1 FG, 23 yard long, 8/8 XP
- CAL – James Langford, 0/1 FG, 5/5 XP

special teams

- ORE – Charles Nelson, 1 PR, 58 yards, 1 TD
- CAL – Tre Watson, 7 KR, 142 yards

In their eighth game the Ducks defeated the California Golden Bears at the newly opened Levi's Stadium in Santa Clara, CA, extending their win streak over the Bears to six seasons. California maintains their lead the all-time series 39-36-2 (.519).

During the game Oregon quarterback Marcus Mariota eclipsed the Oregon record for career passing yards, making him the record holder at Oregon in career total offensive yards, career total touchdowns, career passing yards and career passing touchdowns. Additionally, running back Royce Freeman broke the Oregon record for true freshman rushing yards.

=== Stanford ===
Stanford at #5 Oregon – Game summary

Quarter	1	2	3	4	Total
Stanford	6	7	3	0	16
#5 Oregon	14	10	7	14	45

at Autzen Stadium • Eugene, OR

- Date: Saturday, November 1st, 2014
- Game time: 4:30pm PST
- Game weather: Temperature: 55 °F (13 °C) • Wind: Calm • Weather: Light Rain
- Game attendance: 58,974
- TV announcers (FOX): Gus Johnson, Charles Davis, & Molly McGrath

Game information

First quarter

- ORE – Charles Nelson 6-yard pass from Marcus Mariota (Aiden Schneider Kick)
- STAN – Jordan Williamson 47-yard field goal
- ORE – Mariota 22-yard run (Schneider Kick)
- STAN – Jordan Williamson 43-yard field goal

Second quarter

- ORE – Thomas Tyner 1-yard run (Schneider Kick)
- ORE – Aidan Schneider 40-yard field goal
- STAN – Patrick Skov 1-yard run (Williamson Kick)

Third quarter

- STAN – Williamson 23-yard field goal
- ORE – Tyner 21-yard run (Schneider Kick)

Fourth quarter

- ORE – Mariota 7-yard run (Schneider Kick)
- ORE – Darren Carrington 25-yard pass from Mariota (Schneider Kick)

Top Performers
Passing

- STAN – Kevin Hogan, 21/29, 237 yards, INT
- ORE – Marcus Mariota 19/30, 258 yards, 2 TD, INT

Running

- STAN – Kevin Hogan, 11 carries, 42 yards
- ORE – Royce Freeman, 19 carries, 98 yards

Receiving

- STAN – Devon Cajuste, 5 receptions, 116 yards
- ORE – Darren Carrington, 4 receptions, 58 yards, TD

Defense

- STAN –
- ORE – Erick Dargan, 12 tackles, INT

Kicking

- STAN – Jordan Williamson, 3/3 FG, 47 yard long, 1/1 XP
- ORE – Aidan Schneider, 1/1 FG, 40 yard long, 6/6 XP

special teams

- STAN – Ty Montgomery, 5 KR, 111 yards
- ORE – Charles Nelson, 1 KR, 17 yards, 1 PR 2 yards

In their ninth game the Ducks defeated the Stanford Cardinal in Eugene, winning over the Cardinal for the first time since 2011. The Cardinal maintain their lead the all-time series 46–31–1 (.596).

=== Utah ===
#5 Oregon at #20 Utah – Game summary

Quarter	1	2	3	4	Total
#5 Oregon	0	24	3	24	51
#17 Utah	7	3	10	7	27

at Rice-Eccles Stadium • Salt Lake City, UT

- Date: Saturday, November 8th, 2014
- Game time: 7:00pm PST
- Game weather: Temperature: 45 °F (7 °C) • Wind: Calm • Weather: Partly Cloudy
- Game attendance: 47,528
- TV announcers (ESPN): Brad Nessler, Todd Blackledge, & Holly Rowe

Game information

First quarter

- UTAH – Bubba Poole 8-yard run (Andy Phillips Kick)

Second quarter

- ORE – Joe Walker 100-yard fumble return (Aiden Schneider Kick)
- ORE – Dwayne Stanford 3-yard pass from Marcus Mariota (Schneider Kick)
- ORE – Pharaoh Brown 6-yard pass from Mariota (Schneider Kick)
- ORE – Schneider 39-yard field goal
- UTAH – Phillips 32-yard field goal

Third quarter

- UTAH – Phillips 28-yard field goal
- ORE – Schneider 31-yard field goal
- UTAH – Devontae Booker 27-yard pass from Travis Wilson (Phillips Kick)

Fourth quarter

- ORE – Schneider 42-yard field goal
- UTAH – Wesley Tonga 13-yard pass from Travis Wilson (Phillips Kick)
- ORE – Stanford 34-yard pass from Mariota (Schneider Kick)
- ORE – Mariota 1-yard run (Schneider Kick)
- ORE – Royce Freeman 11-yard run (Schneider Kick)

Top Performers
Passing

- ORE – Marcus Mariota, 17/29, 239 yards, 3 TD
- UTAH – Travis Wilson, 18/28, 297 yards, 2 TD, 2 INT

Running

- ORE – Marcus Mariota, 18 carries, 114 yards, TD
- UTAH – Devontae Booker, 18 carries, 65 yards

Receiving

- ORE – Devon Allen, 2 receptions, 69 yards
- UTAH – Kaelin Clay, 5 receptions, 152 yards

Defense

- ORE –
- UTAH –

Kicking

- ORE – Aiden Schneider, 3/3 FG, 42 yard long, 6/6 XP
- UTAH – Andy Phillips, 2/3 FG, 32 yard long, 3/3 XP

special teams

- ORE – Johnathan Loyd, 1 PR, 51 yards
- UTAH – Kaelin Clay, 7 KR, 179 yards

In their tenth game of the season the Ducks defeated the Utah Utes in Salt Lake City. The Ducks extended their lead in the all-time series 20-8 (.714).

By winning this game the Ducks won the Pac-12 North Division, guaranteeing themselves a spot in 2014 Pac-12 Football Championship Game, they are the first team to win the Pac-12 North Division title outright, and have been co-champions in all other years.

During the game starting Oregon center Hroniss Grasu appeared to severely injure his knee, followed by starting tight end Pharaoh Brown severely injuring his lower right leg just a few minutes later.

=== Colorado ===
Colorado at #3 Oregon – Game summary

Quarter	1	2	3	4	Total
Colorado	0	3	7	0	10
#2 Oregon	13	17	14	0	44

at Autzen Stadium • Eugene, OR

- Date: Saturday, November 22nd, 2014
- Game time: 1:30pm PST
- Game weather: Temperature: • Wind: • Weather: Hail/Rain
- Game attendance: 55,898
- Referee: Referee: • Umpire: • Linesman: • Line judge: • Back judge: • Field judge: • Side judge:
- TV announcers (P12N): Ted Robinson, Glenn Parker, & Jill Savage

Game information

First quarter

- ORE – Royce Freeman 20-yard run (Two-Point Conversion Failed)
- ORE – Marcus Mariota 46-yard run (Matt Wogan Kick)

Second quarter

- ORE – Royce Freeman 7-yard run (Wogan Kick)
- COLO – Will Oliver 23-yard field goal
- ORE – Charles Nelson 31-yard pass from Mariota (Wogan Kick)
- ORE – Wogan 25-yard field goal

Third quarter

- ORE – Evan Baylis 15-yard pass from Mariota (Wogan Kick)
- COLO – Donovan Lee 5-yard pass from Sefo Liufau (Oliver Kick)
- ORE – Charles Nelson 14-yard pass from Mariota (Wogan Kick)

Top Performers
Passing

- COLO – Jordan Gehrke, 9/18, 64 yards
- ORE – Marcus Mariota, 24/32, 323 yards, 3 TD

Running

- COLO – Christian Powell, 5 carries, 51 yards
- ORE – Royce Freeman, 17 carries, 105 yards, 2 TD

Receiving

- COLO – Phillip Lindsay, 4 receptions, 26 yards
- ORE – Byron Marshall, 4 receptions, 65 yards

Defense

- COLO –
- ORE –

Kicking

- COLO – Will Oliver, 1/2 FG, 23 yard long, 1/1 XP
- ORE – Matt Wogan, 1/1 FG, 25 yard long, 5/5 XP

special teams

- COLO – Phillip Lindsay, 7 KR, 142 yards
- ORE – Byron Marshall, 1 KR, 20 yards

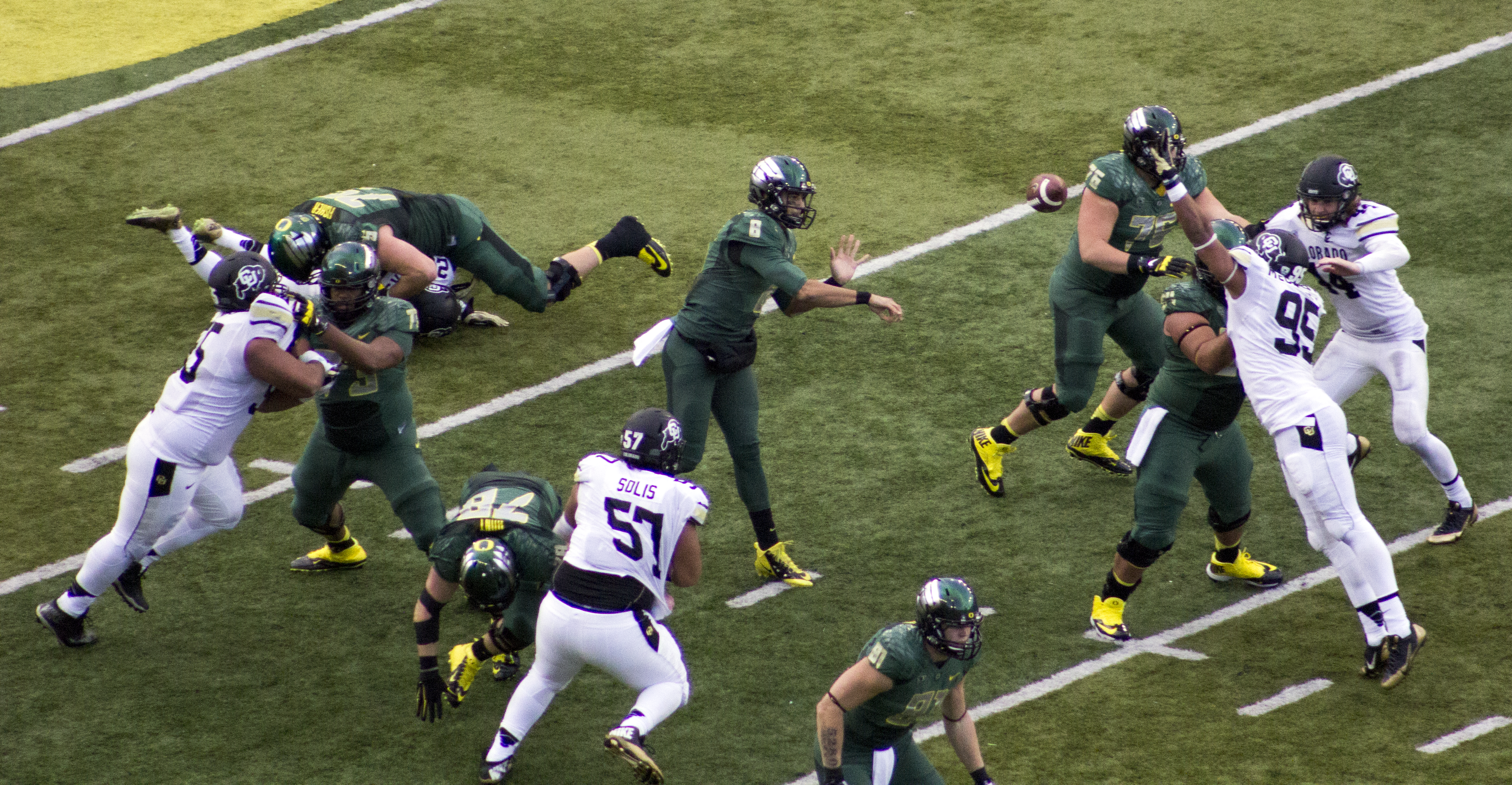
Marcus Mariota throws a pass while playing against Colorado in 2014.

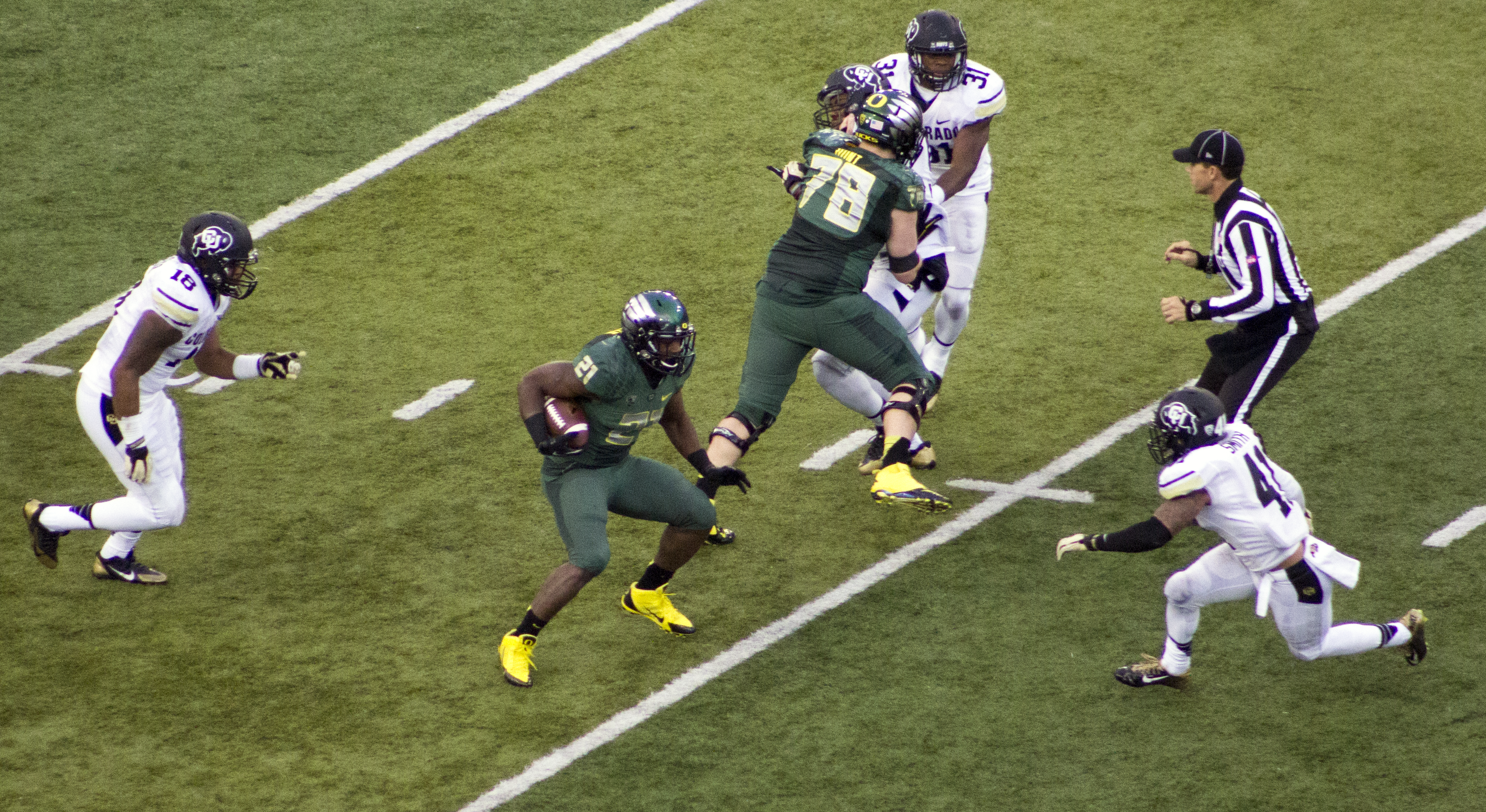
Royce Freeman runs the football while playing against Colorado in 2014.

In their final game at home the Ducks defeated the Colorado Buffaloes in Eugene and in doing so they increased their lead the all-time series to 11-8 (.579).

=== Oregon State ===
#3 Oregon at Oregon State – Game summary

Quarter	1	2	3	4	Total
#3 Oregon	9	21	10	7	47
Oregon State	0	3	7	9	19

at Reser Stadium • Corvallis, OR

- Date: Saturday, November 29th, 2014
- Game time: 5:00pm PST
- Game weather: Temperature: 41 °F (5 °C) • Wind: Calm • Weather: Clear
- Game attendance: 45,722
- Referee: Referee: Michael Batlan
- TV announcers (ABC): Brad Nessler, Todd Blackledge, & Holly Rowe

Game information

First quarter

- ORE – Charles Nelson 29-yard pass from Marcus Mariota (Two-Point Attempt Failed)
- ORE – Matt Wogan 30-yard field goal

Second quarter

- ORE – Royce Freeman 12-yard pass from Mariota (Wogan Kick)
- ORE – Byron Marshall 77-yard pass from Mariota (Wogan Kick)
- ORE – Mariota 23-yard run (Wogan Kick)
- OSU – Garrett Owens 39-yard field goal

Third quarter

- ORE – Matt Wogan 21-yard field goal
- OSU – Hunter Jarmon 20-yard pass from Sean Mannion (Owens Kick)
- ORE – Mariota 1-yard run (Wogan Kick)

Fourth quarter

- OSU – Storm Woods 3-yard run (Owens Kick)
- ORE – Charles Nelson 27-yard pass from Mariota (Wogan Kick)
- OSU – Oregon -6-yard fumble recovered in their end-zone for a safety

Top Performers
Passing

- ORE – Marcus Mariota, 19/25, 367 yard, 4 TD
- OSU – Sean Mannion, 19/39, 162 yards, TD

Running

- ORE – Royce Freeman, 22 carries, 135 yards
- OSU – Storm Woods, 22 carries, 128 yards, TD

Receiving

- ORE – Byron Marshall, 6 receptions, 131 yards, TD
- OSU – Storm Woods, 6 receptions, 58 yards

Defense

- ORE –
- OSU –

Kicking

- ORE – Matt Wogan, 2/2 FG, 30-yard long, 5/5 XP
- OSU – Garrett Owens, 1/1 FG, 39-yard long, 2/2 XP

special teams

- ORE – Charles Nelson, 3 KR, 66 yards, 1 PR, 1 yard
- OSU – Malcom Marable, 10 KR, 229 yards

In the 2014 edition of the Civil War, Oregon defeated their in-state rival the Oregon State Beavers in Corvallis, OR 47–19 in their seventh straight victory in the 118-year-old series. The Ducks extend their lead the all-time series 62-46-10 (.568).

=== Arizona—Pac-12 Championship Game ===
2014 Pac-12 Conference Football Championship Game – Game summary

Quarter	1	2	3	4	Total
#8 Arizona	0	0	7	6	13
#3 Oregon	6	17	21	7	51

at Levi's Stadium • Santa Clara, CA

- Date: Friday, December 5th, 2014
- Game time: 6:20pm PST
- Game weather: Temperature: 61 °F (16 °C) • Wind: Calm • Weather: Mostly Cloudy, Light Rain
- Game attendance: 45,618
- Referee: Referee:
- TV announcers (FOX): Tim Brando, Joel Klatt, & Jenny Taft

Game information

First quarter

- ORE – Aidan Schneider 34-yard field goal
- ORE – Schneider 22-yard field goal

Second quarter

- ORE – Marcus Mariota 7-yard run (Schneider Kick)
- ORE – Mariota 4-yard run (Schneider Kick)
- ORE – Schneider 31-yard field goal

Third quarter

- ORE – Devon Allen 4-yard pass from Mariota (Schneider Kick)
- ARI – Caleb Jones 69-yard pass from Jesse Scroggins (Casey Skowron Kick)
- ORE – Darren Carrington 11-yard pass from Mariota (Schneider Kick)
- ORE – Marcus Mariota 1-yard run (Schneider Kick)

Fourth quarter

- ORE – Kenny Bassett 19-yard run (Schneider Kick)
- ARI – Jerrard Randall 25-yard run (Skowron Kick)

Top Performers
Passing

- ORE – Marcus Mariota, 25/38, 313 yards, 2 TD
- ARI – Jesse Scroggins, 3/11, 79 yards, TD, INT

Running

- ORE – Royce Freeman, 21 carries, 114 yards
- ARI – Jerrard Randall, 10 carries, 81 yards, TD

Receiving

- ORE – Darren Carrington, 7 receptions, 126 yards, TD
- ARI – Cayleb Jones, 2 receptions, 71 yards, TD

Defense

- ORE –
- ARI –

Kicking

- ORE – Aidan Schneider, 3/4 FG, 34-yard long, 6/6 XP
- ARI – Casey Skowron, 1/1 XP

special teams

- ORE – Johnathan Loyd, 4 PR, 61 yards
- ARI – Tyrell Johnson, 8 KR, 211 yards

On December 5, 2014, the Ducks won their 12th Pac-12 Conference Championship by defeating the Arizona Wildcats, the only team to defeat the Ducks this so far in the season, 51–13 in the 2014 Pac-12 Football Championship Game. The Ducks snapped a two-game losing streak against the Wildcats, extending their lead in the overall series to 25-16 (.610). Winning this game gives Oregon their 12th win on the year, their fourth 12-win season in the last five years.

In winning the Pac-12 Conference Championship the Ducks all but assured themselves of a berth in the inaugural College Football Playoff, the seeding of which will be announced two days after the game on Sunday December 7, 2014.

=== Florida State—CFP Semifinal at the Rose Bowl ===
2015 College Football Playoff Semifinals at the Rose Bowl – Game summary

Quarter	1	2	3	4	Total
#3 Florida State	3	10	7	0	20
#2 Oregon	8	10	27	14	59

at Rose Bowl • Pasadena, CA

- Date: Thursday January 1, 2015
- Game time: 2:00 pm PST
- Game weather: Temperature: 50 °F (10 °C) • Wind: Calm • Weather: Sunny
- TV announcers (ESPN/ESPN Radio): Chris Fowler, Kirk Herbstreit, Heather Cox, & Tom Rinaldi/Sean McDonough, Chris Spielman, & Todd McShay

Game information

First quarter

- FSU – Robert Aguayo 28-yard field goal (FSU 3-0)
- ORE – Royce Freeman 1-yard run (Taylor Alie pass to Christian French for Two-Point Conversion) (ORE 8-3)

Second quarter

- ORE – Aidan Schneider 28-yard field goal (ORE 11-3)
- FSU – Aguayo 26-yard field goal (ORE 11-6)
- ORE – Thomas Tyner 1-yard run (Schneider Kick) ORE (18-6)
- FSU – Karlos Williams 10-yard run (Aguayo Kick) ORE (18-13)

Third quarter

- ORE – Freeman 3-yard run (Schneider Kick) ORE (25-13)
- FSU – Travis Rudolph 18-yard pass from Jameis Winston (Aguayo Kick) ORE (25-20)
- ORE – Darren Carrington 56-yard pass from Marcus Mariota (Schneider Kick) ORE( 32-20)
- ORE – Carrington 30-yard pass from Mariota (Schneider Kick) ORE( 39-20)
- ORE – Tony Washington 58-yard fumble return (PAT Blocked) ORE (45-20)

Fourth quarter

- ORE – Mariota 23-yard run (Schneider Kick) Oregon (52-20)
- ORE – Tyner 21-yard run (Schneider Kick) Oregon (59-20)

Top Performers
Passing

- FSU – Jameis Winston, 26/36, 338 yards, 2 TD, INT
- ORE – Marcus Mariota, 29/45, 348 yards, 2 TD, INT

Running

- FSU – Dalvin Cook, 15 carries, 103 yards
- ORE – Thomas Tyner, 13 carries, 124 yards, 2 TD

Receiving

- FSU – Travis Rudolph, 6 receptions, 96 yards, TD
- ORE – Darren Carrington, 7 receptions, 165 yards, 2 TD

Defense

- FSU –
- ORE –

Kicking

- FSU – Roberto Aguayo, 2/3 FG, 28-yard long, 2/2 XP
- ORE – Aidan Schneider, 1/1 FG, 28-yard long, 6/7 XP

special teams

- FSU – Kermit Whitfield, 6 KR, 131 yards
- ORE – Byron Marshall, 2 KR, 28 yards

On January 1, 2015, the Ducks ended the 29-game win streak of the ACC champion Florida State Seminoles in the Rose Bowl, Florida State's first loss since November 24, 2012. Oregon's 59 points were the most ever scored in a Rose Bowl. Their 41 points in the second half were also the most ever scored in one half of a Rose Bowl. The 2015 Rose Bowl served as a semifinal in the inaugural year of the College Football Playoff; by winning the Ducks advanced to the College Football Playoff National Championship Game, facing the Ohio State Buckeyes.

=== Ohio State—CFP National Championship Game ===
2015 College Football National Championship Game – Game summary

Quarter	1	2	3	4	Total
#2 Oregon	7	3	10	0	20
#4 Ohio State	14	7	7	14	42

at AT&T Stadium • Arlington, TX

- Date: Monday January 12, 2015
- Game time: 5:30 pm PST
- Game weather: Played indoors (retractable roof closed)
- TV announcers: Chris Fowler, Kirk Herbstreit, Heather Cox, & Tom Rinaldi/Eduardo Varela & Pablo Viruega/Mike Tirico, Todd Blackledge, Holly Rowe, & Joe Schad

Game information

First quarter

- ORE – Keanon Lowe 7-yard pass from Marcus Mariota (Aidan Schneider Kick)
- OSU – Ezekiel Elliott 33-yard run (Sean Nuernberger Kick)
- OSU – Nick Vannett 1-yard pass from Cardale Jones (Nuernberger Kick)

Second quarter

- OSU – Jones 1-yard run (Nuernberger Kick)
- ORE – Schneider 26-yard field goal

Third quarter

- ORE – Byron Marshall 70-yard pass from Mariota (Schneider Kick)
- ORE – Schneider 23-yard field goal
- OSU – Ezekiel Elliott 9-yard run (Sean Nuernberger Kick)

Fourth quarter

- OSU – Ezekiel Elliott 2-yard run (Sean Nuernberger Kick)
- OSU – Ezekiel Elliott 1-yard run (Sean Nuernberger Kick)

Top Performers
Passing

- OSU –
- ORE –

Running

- OSU –
- ORE –

Receiving

- OSU –
- ORE –

Defense

- OSU –
- ORE –

Kicking

- OSU –
- ORE –

special teams

- OSU –
- ORE –

Following victories in their respective bowl games on January 1, the No. 2 Ducks and the No. 4 Buckeyes advanced to face each other in the inaugural College Football Playoff National Championship at AT&T Stadium. Coming into the game, Oregon had never beaten Ohio State, holding an 0–8 all-time record against the Buckeyes.

Oregon won the coin toss and elected to receive the ball the start the game. The Ducks' first drive featured running back Thomas Tyner and quarterback Marcus Mariota driving Oregon 75 yards and scoring on a 7-yard touchdown pass from Mariota to Keanon Lowe to give Oregon an early 7–0 lead. The Buckeye offense struggled on their first drive, going only 17 yards, and was forced to punt. The Buckeye defense stopped Oregon at midfield on their next possession and forced them to punt, setting up Ohio State inside their own 3-yard line. During the drive, Ohio State went 97 yards and scored their first points of the game on a 33-yard touchdown run from Ezekiel Elliott, tying the game at 7–7. The Buckeye defense forced the Ducks to punt on their next two possessions. The Ohio State offense took advantage by scoring on a touchdown pass from Cardale Jones to Nick Vannett, making the score 14–7 Ohio State at the end of the first quarter.

On the fourth play of the second quarter, Ohio State turned the ball over on a fumble by Cardale Jones, giving the Ducks possession of the ball at own 41-yard line. The Ducks drove down to the Ohio State 3-yard line, but were unable to take advantage of the turnover after failing to convert on fourth down. The Buckeye offense took over at their own 1-yard line and quickly drove to midfield. The drive ended, however, on another Ohio State turnover, this time on a pass from Jones to Devin Smith that was fumbled by Smith, which allowed Oregon to take over at their own 9-yard line. Oregon, again, was unable to capitalize on the turnover, with the Buckeye defense forcing a three and out. The ensuing Ohio State possession took only 6 plays and ended with a touchdown run from Jones, giving Ohio State a 21–7 lead. The next Ducks possession went 66 yards in 12 plays and ended with a 26-yard field goal from Aidan Schneider. After the Oregon defense forced a three and out on the Buckeyes' next possession, Oregon went into halftime, trailing Ohio State 21–10.

Ohio State received the opening kickoff of the second half. Ohio State turned the ball over on their first possession of the half on a Cardale Jones pass intercepted by Danny Mattingly returned to the Oregon 30-yard line. The Ducks took advantage of the turnover in one play on a 70-yard touchdown pass from Marcus Mariota to Byron Marshall, making the score 21–17 Ohio State. The Buckeyes turned the ball over for a fourth time on their next possession, with Jones fumbling the ball inside Ohio State territory. Aidan Schneider made a 23-yard field goal off of the turnover, with the score 21–20 Ohio State. The Buckeyes' ensuing possession went 75 yards in 12 plays, ending on a 9-yard touchdown run from Ezekiel Elliott to make the score 28–20 Ohio State at the end of the third quarter.

After a Buckeye defensive stop, the Ohio State offense and Ezekiel Elliott again scored a touchdown, making the score 35–20 Ohio State early in the fourth quarter. Both teams exchanged punts on their drives. With less than three minutes remaining in the game, the Oregon offense attempted to convert a fourth down, though the pass from Marcus Mariota was incomplete. Ohio State regained possession and scored on a third touchdown from Elliott. The last play of the game was a Mariota pass that was intercepted by Eli Apple and made the final score 42–20. With the loss, Oregon's all-time record against Ohio State fell to 0–9.

== Statistics ==
=== Team ===
Team statistics
	Oregon	Opponents
Scoring & efficiency
Points	661	312
Time of possession per game	27:07	32:53
Points per game	47.2	22.3
Points Per minute	1.74	0.678
Points off turnovers	346	36
First downs	386	321
Rushing	176	114
Passing	185	181
Penalty	25	26
3rd–down conversions	96/186 - 52%	94/226 - 42%
4th–down conversions	17/26 - 65%	16/36 - 44%
Red zone scoring	66/76 – 87%	45/54 – 83%
Red zone touchdowns	51/76 – 67%	32/54 – 59%
Penalties – yards	113 – 1,004	86 – 779
Penalties per game – yards per game	8 – 71.7	6 – 55.6
Offense
Total offense	7,740	5,907
Total plays	1,047	1,084
Average plays per game	75	77
Average yards per play	7.4	5.4
Average per yards game	552.9	421.9
Rushing yards	3,386	2,185
Rushing attempts	611	526
Average per rush	5.5	4.2
Average per game	241.9	156.1
Rushing TDs	42	17
Passing yards	4,354	3,722
Completions–attempts	302-436	335-558
Completion %	69.3	60.0
Average per pass	10.0	6.7
Average per catch	14.4	11.1
Average per game	311.0	265.9
Passing TDs	32	20
Interceptions	3	12
Defense
Interception returns: # – yards	12 – 163	3 – 0
Fumbles recovered: # – yards	18 – 186	6 – 33
QB sacks: # – yards	36 – 275	29 – 159
Touchdowns	2	0
Safeties	0	1
Special teams
Kickoffs: # – yards	118 – 7,242	61 – 3,641
Average yards per kick	61.4	59.7
Net kick average	39.4	38.6
Onside kicks: # – recovered	0 – 0	2 – 5
Punts: # – yards	41 – 1,600	61 – 3,641
Average yards per punt	39.0	42.8
Net punt average	36.7	36.4
Kick returns: # – yards	41 – 834	92 – 1,966
Average yards per return	20.3	21.4
Punt returns: # – yards	27 – 333	8 – 37
Average Yards Per Return	12.3	4.6
Field goals: # – attempts	16 – 19	18 – 24
Longest field goal: yards	40	47

Score by quarter
	1st	2nd	3rd	4th	TOTAL
Oregon	115	235	166	145	661
Opponents	63	91	79	79	312
Difference	+52	+144	+87	+66	+349

=== Offense ===
Passing statistics
#	NAME	POS	RAT	CMP	ATT	YDS	CMP%	TD	INT
8	Marcus Mariota	QB	184.4	280	408	4,121	68.6	42	3
17	Jeff Lockie	QB	154.4	21	27	207	77.8	1	0
21	Royce Freeman	RB	648.4	1	1	26	100.0	1	0
	TOTALS		183.6	302	436	4,354	69.3	44	3
	OPPONENTS		123.6	335	558	3,722	60.0	20	12

Rushing statistics
#	NAME	POS	CAR	YDS	YPC	LONG	TD
21	Royce Freeman	RB	242	1,343	5.5	38 (TD)	18
8	Marcus Mariota	QB	125	731	5.8	61 (TD)	15
24	Thomas Tyner	RB	101	511	5.1	23	5
9	Byron Marshall	WR	51	383	7.5	53	1
31	Kenny Bassett	RB	31	159	5.1	19	2
6	Charles Nelson	WR	11	107	9.2	33	0
36	Kani Benoit	RB	23	98	4.3	35	1
34	Lane Roseberry	RB	6	23	3.8	7	0
5	Devon Allen	WR	1	21	21.0	21	0
30	Ayele Forde	RB	3	17	5.7	6	0
17	Jeff Lockie	QB	4	10	2.5	13	0
7	Keanon Lowe	WR	1	9	9.0	9	0
37	J.J. Jones	RB	3	-2	-0.7	0	0
TM	TEAM		9	-18	-18.0	–	–
	TOTALS		611	3,386	5.5	61	42
	OPPONENTS		526	2,578	4.2	45	17

Receiving statistics
#	NAME	POS	REC	YDS	AVG	LONG	TD
9	Byron Marshall	WR	66	834	12.6	77 (TD)	5
87	Darren Carrington	WR	37	704	19.0	64 (TD)	4
5	Devon Allen	WR	41	684	16.7	80 (TD)	7
18	Dwayne Stanford	WR	39	578	14.8	62 (TD)	6
85	Pharaoh Brown	TE	25	420	16.8	66	6
7	Keanon Lowe	WR	25	359	14.4	57 (TD)	4
6	Charles Nelson	WR	21	306	14.6	73 (TD)	5
21	Royce Freeman	RB	16	158	9.9	30 (TD)	1
32	Evan Baylis	TE	10	118	11.8	30	1
24	Thomas Tyner	RB	9	65	7.2	21	0
10	Jonathan Loyd	WR	4	19	4.8	5 (TD)	1
31	Kenny Bassett	RB	2	36	18.0	27	0
83	Johhny Mundt	TE	2	29	14.5	24	0
8	Marcus Mariota	QB	1	26	26.0	26 (TD)	1
82	Zach Schuller	WR	2	9	4.5	10	0
36	Kani Benoit	RB	1	8	8.0	8	0
55	Hroniss Grasu	C	1	1	1.0	1	0
	TOTALS		302	4,354	14.4	80	42
	OPPONENTS		335	3,722	11.1	78	20

=== Defense ===
Defense statistics
#	NAME	POS	SOLO	AST	TOT	TFL-YDS	SACKS	INT-YDS	BU	PD	QBH	FR–YDS	FF	BLK	SAF
4	Erik Dargan	FS	34	19	53	2.5 – 4	–	4 – 86	3	7	–	–	–	–	–
22	Derrick Malone	LB	19	31	50	2.0 – 3	–	–	1	1	1	1 – 0	–	–	–
35	Joe Walker	LB	27	23	50	5.0 – 8	–	–	–	–	1	–	–	–	–
44	DeForest Buckner	DL	21	28	49	8.0 – 26	2.5 – 14	–	2	2	2	–	1	–	–
8	Reggie Daniels	DB	36	12	49	0.5 – 2	–	1 – 0	7	8	–	–	1	–	–
48	Rodney Hardrick	LB	21	25	46	6.0 – 24	1.0 – 10	–	–	–	3	–	–	–	–
14	Ifo Ekpre-Olomu	CB	26	14	40	1.0 – 3	–	2 – 31	6	8	–	–	–	–	–
13	Troy Hill	CB	31	7	38	2.0 – 2	–	–	12	12	–	–	1	–	–
91	Tony Washington	LB	17	11	28	5.0 – 46	3.0 – 39	–	1	1	–	1 – 0	2	–	–
2	Tyree Robinson	DB	18	7	25	1.0 – 3	–	–	1	1	–	–	–	–	–
33	Tyson Coleman	LB	10	9	19	3.0 – 16	2.0 – 14	–	1	1	2	–	–	–	–
9	Arik Armstead	DL	10	7	17	4.0 – 6	1.0 – 2	–	–	–	4	1 –0	1	–	–
96	Christian French	DE	8	6	14	4.5 – 33	4.5 – 33	–	–	–	1	1 – 0	1	–	–
86	Torrodney Prevot	LB	8	6	14	2.5 – 19	2.5 – 19	–	2	2	–	–	2	–	–
99	Sam Kamp	DL	8	5	13	1.0 – 2	–	–	1	1	–	–	–	–	–
12	Chris Seisay	DB	9	3	12	–	–	–	2	2	–	–	–	–	–
45	T.J. Daniels	DE	3	8	11	1.5 – 2	1.0 – 1	–	1	1	1	–	–	–	–
56	Alex Balducci	DL	4	6	10	2.5 – 5	1.0 – 4	–	–	–	–	1 – 0	–	–	–
6	Charles Nelson	WR	7	3	10	–	–	–	–	–	–	–	–	–	–
3	Dior Mathis	CB	7	3	10	1.0 – 9	1.0 – 9	–	3	3	–	–	2 – 0	–	–
55	Tui Talia	DL	2	7	9	0.5 – 1	0.5 – 1	–	–	–	–	2 – 0	–	–	–
50	Austin Maloata	DL	3	5	8	–	–	–	–	–	–	–	–	–	–
27	Johnny Ragin	LB	6	2	8	–	–	–	–	–	–	–	–	–	–
11	Justin Hollins	LB	2	4	6	1.0 – 5	–	–	–	–	–	–	–	–	–
30	Ayele Ford	RB	3	3	6	–	–	–	–	–	–	–	–	–	–
46	Danny Mattingly	LB	2	4	6	1.0 – 11	1.0 – 11	–	1	1	–	–	–	–	–
18	Jimmie Swain	LB	1	4	5	–	–	–	–	–	–	–	–	–	–
17	Juwaan Williams	DB	2	3	5	1.0 – 11	1.0 – 11	–	–	–	–	–	–	–	–
31	Kenny Bassett	RB	3	2	5	–	–	–	–	–	–	–	–	–	–
92	Henry Mondeaux	DE	–	4	4	0.5 – 1	–	–	–	–	–	–	–	–	–
1	Arrion Springs	CB	2	–	2	–	–	–	–	–	–	–	–	–	–
5	Devon Allen	WR	–	1	1	–	–	–	–	–	–	–	–	–	–
51	Isaac Ava	LB	–	1	1	–	–	–	–	–	–	–	–	–	–
84	Stetzon Bair	DL	–	1	1	–	–	–	–	–	–	–	–	–	–
TM	TEAM		1	–	1	1.0 – 4	1.0 – 4	–	–	–	–	–	–	–	–
38	Mike Garrity	LB	1	–	1	–	–	–	–	–	–	–	–	–	–
39	Tanner Carew	LS	–	1	1	–	–	–	–	–	–	–	–	–	–
42	Cody Carriger	DL	1	–	1	–	–	–	–	–	–	–	–	–	–
	TOTAL		356	276	632	58 – 245	23 – 171	7 – 117	44	51	16	9 – 0	9	–	–
	OPPONENTS		331	266	597	40 – 136	18 – 97	1 – 0	16	17	4	4 – 28	4	1	–

Key: POS: Position, SOLO: Solo tackles, AST: Assisted Tackles, TOT: Total tackles, TFL: Tackles-for-loss, SACK: Quarterback Sacks, INT: Interceptions, BU: Passes Broken Up, PD: Passes Defended, QBH: Quarterback Hits, FF: Forced Fumbles, FR: Fumbles Recovered, BLK: Kicks or Punts Blocked, SAF: Safeties

=== Special teams ===
Kicking statistics
#	NAME	POS	XPM	XPA	XP%	FGM	FGA	FG%	1–19	20–29	30–39	40–49	50+	LNG	PTS
47	Matt Wogan	PK	29	31	93.5	4	6	66.7	0/0	3/3	1/3	0/0	0/0	28	41
41	Aiden Schneider	PK	6	7	85.7	0	0	0	0/0	0/0	0/0	0/0	0/0	0	6
	TOTALS		35	38	92.1	4	6	66.7	0/0	3/3	1/3	0/0	0/0	34	47
	OPPONENTS		17	17	100	9	11	81.8	0/0	4/5	3/3	3/4	0/0	47	44

Kickoff statistics
#	NAME	POS	KICKS	YDS	AVG	TB	OB
47	Matt Wogan	PK	27	1,748	64.7	13	0
41	Aiden Schneider	PK	26	1,574	60.5	5	0
	TOTALS		53	3,322	62.7	18	0
	OPPONENTS		33	1,991	60.3	7	1

Punting statistics
#	NAME	POS	PUNTS	YDS	AVG	LONG	TB	FC	I–20	50+	BLK
38	Ian Wheeler	P	22	890	40.5	53	1	4	3	3	0
	TOTALS		22	890	40.5	53	1	4	3	3	0
	OPPONENTS		28	1,179	42.1	59	2	3	8	3	0

Kick return statistics
#	NAME	POS	RTNS	YDS	AVG	TD	LNG
6	Charles Nelson	WR	11	213	19.4	0	28
24	Thomas Tyner	RB	7	151	21.6	0	30
5	Devon Allen	WR	4	90	22.5	0	26
4	Erik Dargan	DB	1	20	20.0	0	20
7	Keanon Lowe	WR	1	10	10.0	0	10
44	DeForest Buckner	DL	1	10	10.0	0	10
13	Troy Hill	CB	1	7	7.0	0	7
	TOTALS		26	501	19.3	0	30
	OPPONENTS		35	674	19.3	0	59

Punt return statistics
#	NAME	POS	RTNS	YDS	AVG	TD	LONG
6	Charles Nelson	WR	6	62	10.3	1	50 (TD)
14	Ifo Ekpre-Olomu	CB	5	36	7.2	0	26
10	Jonathan Loyd	WR	1	-4	-4.0	0	0
	TOTALS		12	94	7.8	1	50 (TD)
	OPPONENTS		7	36	5.1	0	18

== Postseason ==
=== Awards ===
==== NCFAA Awards ====
- Heisman Trophy

Marcus Mariota (2014)

- Maxwell Award

Marcus Mariota (2014)

- Walter Camp Award

Marcus Mariota (2014)

- Davey O'Brien Award

Marcus Mariota (2014)

- Johnny Unitas Golden Arm Award

Marcus Mariota

==== Pac-12 Conference awards ====
- Offensive Player of the Year

Marcus Mariota

- Freshman Offensive Player of the Year

Royce Freeman

==== Team awards ====
- Skeie's Award

Marcus Mariota 3rd

- Wilford Gonyea Award

Marcus Mariota 2nd
Keanon Lowe

- Most Outstanding Defensive Player

Eric Dargan

- Todd Doxey Award

Keanon Lowe

- Len Casanova Award

Royce Freeman

- Elmer Sahlstrom Award

Kenny Bassett

- Duane J. Cargill Memorial Award

Pharaoh Brown

- Pancake Club Award

Tyrell Crosby

- Ed Moshofsky Trophy

Hroniss Grasu

- Gordon E. Wilson Award

Charles Nelson

- Dudley Clarke Memorial Award

Joe Walker

- Joe Schaffeld Trophy

DeForest Buckner

- Scout Team Player of the Year

Ayele Ford & Michael Manns

- Scout Team Special Teams Player of the Year

Tony James

=== All-American Teams ===
==== All-Americans ====
Each year several publications release lists of their ideal "team". The athletes on these lists are referred to as All-Americans. The NCAA recognizes five All-American lists. They are the Associated Press (AP), American Football Coaches Association (AFCA), Football Writers Association of America (FWAA), Sporting News (SN), and the Walter Camp Football Foundation (WCFF). If a player is selected to the first team of three publications he is considered a consensus All-American, if a player is selected to the first team of all five publications he is considered a unanimous All-American.

- Marcus Mariota, quarterback, Junior, (AP, AFCA, FWAA, SN, WCFF)
- Hroniss Grasu, center, Senior (AP, SN, WCFF)
- Jake Fisher, tackle, Senior (AP, FWAA)
- Ifo Ekpre-Olomu, defensive back, Senior (AP, AFCA, SN, WCFF)

Key:
First team
Consensus All-American
Unanimous All-American

==== Pac-12 All-Conference Team ====
The Ducks had 10 players honored as members of the 2014 Pac-12 All-Conference team, with five each on the first and second teams, respectively. Four other Ducks earned honorable mention honors.

- First team

Pharaoh Brown, TE, JR
Ifo Ekpre-Olomu, CB, JR
Jake Fisher, OL, SR
Hroniss Grasu, OL, SR
Marcus Mariota, QB, JR

- Second team

DeForest Buckner, LB, JR
Erick Dargan, FS, SR
Royce Freeman, RB, FR
Troy Hill, CB, SR
Charles Nelson, WR, FR

- Honorable mention

Arik Armstead, DE, JR
Byron Marshall, RB, JR
Hamani Stevens, OL, SR
Joe Walker, LB, JR

=== All-Academic Teams ===
==== NCAA Academic All-Americans ====
Alan Solis Perth Amboy, New Jersey

==== Pac-12 Conference All-Academic players ====
The Ducks had two players selected to the Pac-12 Conference All-Academic Second Team, six players granted honorable mention and no players selected to the First Team. In order to be eligible for the academic team a player must maintain a minimum 3.0 overall grade-point average and play in at least 50 percent of their team's games.

- Second team

Marcus Mariota, QB, JR, 3.22 GPA, General Science Major
Doug Brenner, OL, FR, 3.56 GPA, Business Administration Major

- Honorable mention

Devon Allen, WR, FR
Taylor Alie, QB, FR
Kenny Bassett, RB, SR
Jake Fisher, OL, SR
Matt Pierson, OL, JR
Matt Wogan, PK, SO

=== Records broken ===
Marcus Mariota

- Pac-12

Career Total Touchdowns – 126 TDs

Pac-12, Matt Barkley – 122 TDs, 2009 - 2012
Oregon, Joey Harrington – 78 TDs, 1998 - 2001

Single Season Total Touchdowns – 48 TDs

Pac-12, Matt Barkley – 41 TDs, 2011
Oregon, Marcus Mariota – 40 TDs, 2013

- Oregon

Career Total Offensive Yards – 11,943 yards

Bill Musgrave – 8,140 yards, 1987 - 1990

Career Passing Yards – 9,812 yards

Bill Musgrave – 8,343 yards, 1987 - 1990

Career Passing touchdowns – 99 TDs

Darron Thomas – 66 TDs, 2008 - 2011

Single Season Passing touchdowns – 36 TDs

Darron Thomas – 33 TDs, 2011

Royce Freeman

- Oregon

Freshman Total Touchdowns – 18 TDs
Freshman Rushing Yards – 1,195 yards
Freshman Rushing touchdowns – 16 TDs

=== NFL Draft and Draft Evaluations ===
==== NFL draft ====
The following members of 2014 Oregon Ducks football team were selected in the 2015 NFL draft.

==== NFL Draft Combine ====
Seven members of the 2014 team were invited to participate in drills at the 2015 NFL Scouting Combine.

2015 NFL combine participants
#	Name	POS	HT	WT	Arms	Hands	40	Bench press	Vert jump	Broad jump	3-cone drill	20-yd shuttle	60-yd shuttle	Ref
8	Marcus Mariota	QB	6 feet 4 inches (1.93 m)	222 pounds (101 kg)	32 inches (81 cm)	9.75 inches (24.8 cm)	4.52 sec†	DNP	36.0 inches (91 cm)	121.0 inches (307 cm)	6.87 sec†	4.11 sec	DNP	
9	Arik Armstead	DE	6 feet 7 inches (2.01 m)	292 pounds (132 kg)	33 inches (84 cm)	10.5 inches (27 cm)	5.10 sec	24 reps	34.0 inches (86 cm)	117.0 inches (297 cm)	7.57 sec	4.53 sec	DNP	
13	Troy Hill	DB	5 feet 10 inches (1.78 m)	182 pounds (83 kg)	29.5 inches (75 cm)	8.75 inches (22.2 cm)	4.55 sec	DNP	32.5 inches (83 cm)	120.0 inches (305 cm)	6.81 sec	4.21 sec	11.77 sec	
14	Ifo Ekpre-Olomu	CB	5 feet 9 inches (1.75 m)	192 pounds (87 kg)	30.875 inches (78.42 cm)	9.625 inches (24.45 cm)	DNP	DNP	DNP	DNP	DNP	DNP	DNP	
55	Hroniss Grasu	C	6 feet 3 inches (1.91 m)	297 pounds (135 kg)	32.125 inches (81.60 cm)	10.25 inches (26.0 cm)	DNP	DNP	DNP	DNP	DNP	DNP	DNP	
75	Jake Fisher	OT	6 feet 6 inches (1.98 m)	306 pounds (139 kg)	32.75 inches (83.2 cm)	10.375 inches (26.35 cm)	5.01 sec	25 reps	32.5 inches (83 cm)	DNP	7.25 sec†	4.33 sec†	DNP	
91	Tony Washington	LB	6 feet 4 inches (1.93 m)	247 pounds (112 kg)	33 inches (84 cm)	9.5 inches (24 cm)	4.99 sec	17 reps	32.5 inches (83 cm)	110.0 inches (279 cm)	7.20 sec	4.31 sec	12.83	

† Top performer

== Notes ==
- April 7, 2014 – Johnathan Loyd, Oregon Basketball's all-time winningest player utilizes his fifth year of eligibility in a different sport (a sport other than basketball) to play the wide receiver position for the Oregon Football Team.
- May 5, 2014 – Linebacker Rahim Cassell is arrested by Eugene Police for Driving Under the Influence of Intoxicants (DUII).
- May 12, 2014 – Quarterback Jake Rodrigues announces that he is seeking to transfer from the University of Oregon. Rodrigues was outperformed by fellow back-up quarterback Jeff Lockie during spring practices and was informed that Lockie would be the second-string quarterback in the fall. Rodrigues is a former 4-star recruit from the 2012 class.
- May 17, 2014 – Quarterback Damion Hobbs announces that he is seeking to transfer from the University of Oregon. Hobbs was outperformed by fellow back-up quarterbacks Jeff Lockie and Jake Rodrigues during spring practices and was informed that Lockie would be the second-string quarterback in the fall. Hobbs is a former 3-star recruit from the 2013 class.
- June 6, 2014 – Linebacker Tyrell Robinson announces that he is seeking to transfer from the University of Oregon.
- June 12, 2014 – Defensive back Eric Amoako announces that he is seeking to transfer from the University of Oregon so that he can play closer to his native state of Texas.
- June 14, 2014 – Wide receiver Devon Allen wins the 2014 NCAA Championship in 110 meter hurdles, setting the second fastest time in NCAA history.
- June 18, 2014 – Linebacker Oshay Dunmore announces that he is seeking to transfer from the University of Oregon. Anonymous sources link his departure with that of Tyrell Robinson, saying that their scholarships were not going be renewed due to unspecified violations of team rules.
- June 29, 2014 – Devon Allen wins the 2014 USA Outdoor Track and Field Championship in 110 meter hurdles, becoming the first athlete to win the NCAA title and USATF title in the same year since 1979. Allen beat out a field of 6 professionals, including 2 Olympians as well as a fellow Pac-12 athlete, Aleec Harris from USC.
- August 11, 2014 – Oregon announces that left tackle Tyler Johnstone re-tore his ACL during a summer practice and will undergo surgery. Johnstone initially tore the ACL during the 2013 Alamo Bowl and was expecting to play in the 2014 season, however with the new injury he is projected to be out for the season.
- December 17, 2014 – Oregon announces that All-American cornerback Ifo Ekpre-Olomu has suffered a season ending ACL tear during practice.
