= Ricky Havili-Heimuli =

American football player (born 1991)

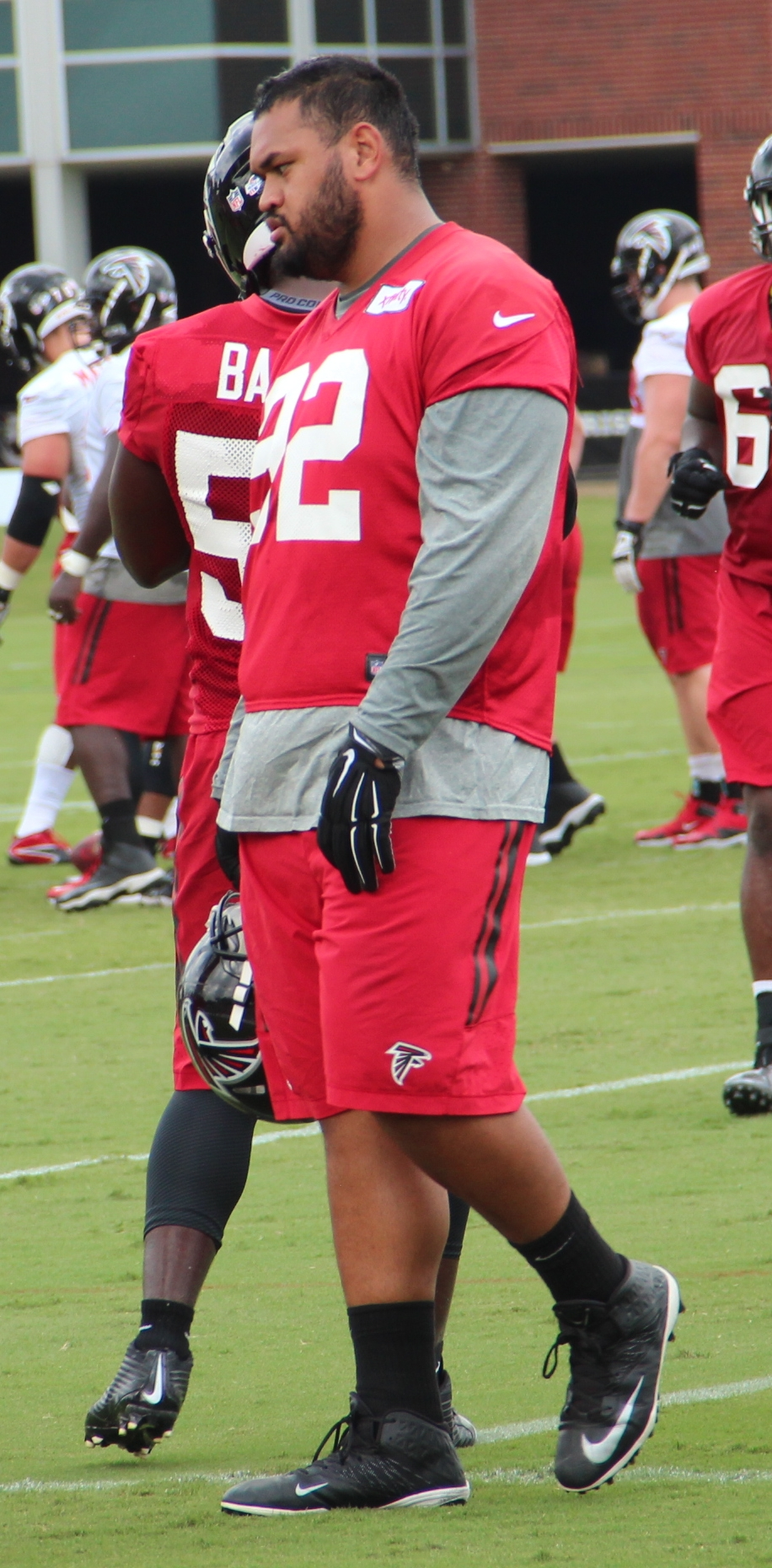
- Havili-Heimuli with the Atlanta Falcons

No. 92
- Position: Defensive tackle

Personal information
- Born: September 18, 1991 (age 35); Glendale, Utah
- Listed height: 6 ft 4 in (1.93 m)
- Listed weight: 314 lb (142 kg)

Career information
- High school: Brighton (Cottonwood Heights, Utah)
- College: Oregon
- NFL draft: 2014: undrafted

Career history
- Jacksonville Jaguars (2014)*; Atlanta Falcons (2014−2015)
- * Offseason or practice squad member only

Ricky Havili-Heimuli is an American former football defensive tackle. He was signed by the Jacksonville Jaguars after being undrafted in 2014. He played college football at Oregon.

== Professional career ==
=== Jacksonville Jaguars ===
After going unselected in the 2014 NFL draft, Havili-Heimuli signed with the Jacksonville Jaguars on May 12, 2014. He was waived on August 29.

=== Atlanta Falcons ===
On November 18, 2014, Atlanta Falcons signed Havili-Heimuli to their practice squad. He was waived-injured on December 8, 2015
