= Wade Keliikipi =

American football player (born 1991)

No. 74
- Position: Nose tackle

Personal information
- Born: July 21, 1991 (age 35); Waianae, Hawaii, U.S.
- Listed height: 6 ft 2 in (1.88 m)
- Listed weight: 303 lb (137 kg)

Career information
- High school: Waianae
- College: Oregon
- NFL draft: 2014: undrafted

Career history
- Philadelphia Eagles (2014–2015)*
- * Offseason or practice squad member only
- Stats at Pro Football Reference

Wade Kaulana Domonic Keliikipi (kay-lee-ee-KEE-pee; born July 21, 1991) is an American former professional football nose tackle. He was an undrafted free agent by the Philadelphia Eagles in 2014. He played college football at Oregon.

== College career ==
Keliikipi studied general social science at the University of Oregon. He twice received honorable mentions for the All-Pac-12 team. He was a part of three winning bowls with Oregon: 2012 Rose Bowl over Wisconsin, 2013 Fiesta Bowl over 2012 Kansas State, and 2013 Alamo Bowl over Texas.

== Professional career ==
On May 10, 2014, Keliikipi was signed by the Philadelphia Eagles as an undrafted free agent. On August 30, 2014, Keliikipi was waived by the Eagles. On August 31, 2014, he was signed to the practice squad. On December 30, 2014, he was signed a future contract. On August 24, 2015, Keliikipi was waived by the Eagles. On August 25, 2015, he was placed on injured reserve list. On November 16, 2015, Keliikipi was waived from injured reserve list.

== Personal life ==
Keliikipi grew up in the town of Waianae, Hawaii, and played football at Waianae High School. He is the son of West and Gloria Keliikipi. His two brothers, West III and Winston, played football at the University of Hawaii. He is married to Brendorcha Keliikipi.
