= 2015 Oregon Ducks football team =

American college football season

2015 Oregon Ducks football

Alamo Bowl, L 41–47^{3OT} vs. TCU
- Conference: Pac-12 Conference
- North Division

Ranking
- Coaches: No. 20
- AP: No. 19
- Record: 9–4 (7–2 Pac-12)
- Head coach: Mark Helfrich (3rd season)
- Offensive coordinator: Scott Frost (3rd season) (resigned Dec 1, 2015); Matt Lubick (promoted 1/1/2016)
- Offensive scheme: No-huddle spread option
- Defensive coordinator: Don Pellum (2nd season)
- Base defense: Hybrid 3–4
- Captain: Game captains
- Home stadium: Autzen Stadium

2015 Pac-12 Conference football standings
	Conf.			Overall
Team	W		L	W		L
North Division
No. 3 Stanford xy$	8	–	1	12	–	2
No. 19 Oregon	7	–	2	9	–	4
Washington State	6	–	3	9	–	4
California	4	–	5	8	–	5
Washington	4	–	5	7	–	6
Oregon State	0	–	9	2	–	10
South Division
USC xy	6	–	3	8	–	6
No. 17 Utah x	6	–	3	10	–	3
UCLA	5	–	4	8	–	5
Arizona State	4	–	5	6	–	7
Arizona	3	–	6	7	–	6
Colorado	1	–	8	4	–	9
Championship: Stanford 41, USC 22
$ – Conference champion; x – Division champion/co-champions; y – Championship game participant; Rankings from AP Poll

The 2015 Oregon Ducks football team represented the University of Oregon in the 2015 NCAA Division I FBS football season. The team was led by third-year head coach Mark Helfrich and played their home games at Autzen Stadium for the 49th straight year. They were a member of the Pac-12 Conference in the North Division.

== Departing players ==
=== NFL draft ===
Round	Pick	Player	Position	NFL team
1	2	Marcus Mariota	QB	Tennessee Titans
1	17	Arik Armstead	DE	San Francisco 49ers
2	53 (21)	Jake Fisher	OL	Cincinnati Bengals
3	71 (7)	Hroniss Grasu	C	Chicago Bears
7	241 (21)	Ifo Ekpre-Olomu	DB	Cleveland Browns
UFA	–	Erick Dargan	DB	Cincinnati Bengals
UFA	–	Troy Hill	DB	Cincinnati Bengals
UFA	–	Keanon Lowe	WR	Arizona Cardinals
UFA	–	Dior Mathis	DB	Pittsburgh Steelers
UFA	–	Derrick Malone	LB	Atlanta Falcons
UFA	–	Tony Washington	DE	Houston Texans

== Before the season ==
=== Returning starters ===
Because of the significant number of injuries to the offensive line in 2014, the Ducks feature a large number of returning offensive linemen who have started in at least one game in a previous season.

Thomas Tyner underwent surgery on his left shoulder on August 7, 2015, and has not been included on the roster for 2015, he is going to miss the 2015 season and has not commented about his future as an Oregon Duck football player. Stetzon Bair, Devon Allen and Darren Carrington are also uncertain about their return to the team in 2015.

Offense

No.	Player	Class	Position
9	Byron Marshall	Senior	Wide receiver
11	Bralon Addison	Senior	Wide receiver
21	Royce Freeman	Sophomore	Running back
57	Doug Brenner	(redshirt) Sophomore	Offensive lineman
62	Matt Pierson	(redshirt) Senior	Offensive lineman
64	Tyler Johnstone	(redshirt) Senior	Offensive lineman
72	Andre Yruretagoyena	(redshirt) Junior	Offensive lineman
73	Tyrell Crosby	Sophomore	Offensive lineman
77	Haniteli Louisi	Senior	Offensive lineman
81	Evan Baylis	(redshirt) Junior	Tight end
83	Johnny Mundt	Junior	Tight end
85	Pharaoh Brown	Senior	Tight end
88	Dwayne Stanford	(redshirt) Junior	Wide receiver

Defense

No.	Player	Class	Position
48	Rodney Hardrick	(redshirt) Senior	Inside linebacker

Special teams

No.	Player	Class	Position
49	Matt Wogan	Sophomore	Place Kicker

=== Recruiting ===
College recruiting (2015)
Name	Hometown	School	Height	Weight	40^{‡}	Commit date
Canton Kaumatule #4 DE	Honolulu, HI	Punahou School	6 ft 6 in (1.98 m)	280 lb (130 kg)	-	Nov 1, 2014
Canton Kaumatule #4 DE	Recruit ratings: ESPN:					
Taj Griffin #4 TB	Powder Springs, GA	McEachern HS	5 ft 10 in (1.78 m)	169 lb (77 kg)	-	Apr 24, 2014
Taj Griffin #4 TB	Recruit ratings: ESPN:					
Alex Ofodile #10 WR	Columbia, MO	Rock Bridge HS	6 ft 2 in (1.88 m)	185 lb (84 kg)	-	Jun 24, 2014
Alex Ofodile #10 WR	Recruit ratings: ESPN:					
Malik Lovette #17 ATH	Redlands, CA	Redlands East Valley HS	5 ft 11 in (1.80 m)	187 lb (85 kg)	-	Aug 30, 2014
Malik Lovette #17 ATH	Recruit ratings: ESPN:					
Zach Okun #14 OG	Newbury Park, CA	Newbury Park HS	6 ft 5 in (1.96 m)	324 lb (147 kg)	-	Mar 4, 2014
Zach Okun #14 OG	Recruit ratings: ESPN:					
Travis Waller #8 QB (-DT)	Anaheim, CA	Servite HS	6 ft 3 in (1.91 m)	194 lb (88 kg)	-	Jul 1, 2014
Travis Waller #8 QB (-DT)	Recruit ratings: ESPN:					
Ugo Amadi #25 CB	Nashville, TN	Overton HS	5 ft 10 in (1.78 m)	183 lb (83 kg)	-	Jan 8, 2015
Ugo Amadi #25 CB	Recruit ratings: ESPN:					
Jake Hanson #36 OT	Eureka, CA	Eureka HS	6 ft 4 in (1.93 m)	288 lb (131 kg)	-	Jun 22, 2014
Jake Hanson #36 OT	Recruit ratings: ESPN:					
Travis Jonsen #11 QB	Anaheim, CA	Servite HS	6 ft 3 in (1.91 m)	194 lb (88 kg)	-	Jul 1, 2014
Travis Jonsen #11 QB	Recruit ratings: ESPN:					
Jake Breeland #67 WR	Mission Viejo, CA	Trabuco Hills HS	6 ft 5 in (1.96 m)	200 lb (91 kg)	-	Apr 8, 2014
Jake Breeland #67 WR	Recruit ratings: ESPN:					
P. J. Locke #36 S	Beaumont, TX	Central HS	5 ft 10 in (1.78 m)	189 lb (86 kg)	-	Jul 1, 2014
P. J. Locke #36 S	Recruit ratings: ESPN:					
Shane Lemieux #54 OT	Yakima, WA	West Valley HS	6 ft 6 in (1.98 m)	280 lb (130 kg)	-	May 3, 2014
Shane Lemieux #54 OT	Recruit ratings: ESPN:					
Brady Aiello #57 OT	Lafayette, CA	Acalanes HS	6 ft 7 in (2.01 m)	258 lb (117 kg)	-	Jun 20, 2014
Brady Aiello #57 OT	Recruit ratings: ESPN:					
Jihree Stewart #42 CB	Corona, CA	Centennial HS	5 ft 11 in (1.80 m)	173 lb (78 kg)	-	Jun 12, 2014
Jihree Stewart #42 CB	Recruit ratings: ESPN:					
Calvin Throckmorton #71 OT	Bellevue, WA	Newport HS	6 ft 5 in (1.96 m)	270 lb (120 kg)	-	Jun 21, 2014
Calvin Throckmorton #71 OT	Recruit ratings: ESPN:					
Rex Manu #61 DT	Mililani, HI	Mililani HS	6 ft 3 in (1.91 m)	298 lb (135 kg)	-	Dec 6, 2014
Rex Manu #61 DT	Recruit ratings: ESPN:					
Drayon Carlberg #62 DT	Minneapolis, MN	De La Salle HS	6 ft 5 in (1.96 m)	270 lb (120 kg)	-	Nov 14, 2014
Drayon Carlberg #62 DT	Recruit ratings: ESPN:					
Dylan Kane #80 S	Honolulu, HI	Kamehameha Schools	6 ft 3 in (1.91 m)	194 lb (88 kg)	-	Jul 21, 2014
Dylan Kane #80 S	Recruit ratings: ESPN:					
Paris Bostic #7 OLB (JC)	Tampa, FL	Santa Monica College	6 ft 1 in (1.85 m)	215 lb (98 kg)	-	Jan 3, 2015
Paris Bostic #7 OLB (JC)	Recruit ratings: ESPN:					
Gus Cumberlander #106 DE	Ellenwood, GA	Cedar Grove HS	6 ft 6 in (1.98 m)	241 lb (109 kg)	-	Oct 4, 2014
Gus Cumberlander #106 DE	Recruit ratings: ESPN:					
Overall recruit ranking:
‡ Refers to 40-yard dash; Note: In many cases, Scout, Rivals, 247Sports, On3, and ESPN may conflict in their listings of height, weight and 40 time.; In these cases, the average was taken. ESPN grades are on a 100-point scale.; Sources: "2015 Team Ranking". Rivals.com.

=== Spring football ===
2015 Oregon Duck Football Spring Game – Game summary

Quarter	1	2	3	4	Total
Oregon	2	14	6	7	29
Pathway	14	14	7	0	35

at Autzen Stadium • Eugene, OR

- Date: May 2, 2015
- Game time: 11:00 a.m. PST
- TV: P12N

== Schedule ==
Date	Time	Opponent	Rank	Site	TV	Result	Attendance
September 5	5:00 pm	No. 6 (FCS) Eastern Washington*	No. 7	Autzen Stadium; Eugene, OR	P12N	W 61–42	58,128
September 12	5:00 pm	at No. 5 Michigan State*	No. 7	Spartan Stadium; East Lansing, MI (College GameDay)	ABC	L 28–31	76,526
September 19	11:00 am	Georgia State*	No. 12	Autzen Stadium; Eugene, OR	P12N	W 61–28	56,859
September 26	5:30 pm	No. 18 Utah	No. 13	Autzen Stadium; Eugene, OR	FOX	L 20–62	57,145
October 3	7:00 pm	at Colorado		Folsom Field; Boulder, CO	ESPN	W 41–24	46,222
October 10	3:00 pm	Washington State		Autzen Stadium; Eugene, OR	P12N	L 38–45 ^{2OT}	57,775
October 17	7:30 pm	at Washington		Husky Stadium; Seattle, WA (rivalry)	ESPN2	W 26–20	69,285
October 29	7:30 pm	at Arizona State		Sun Devil Stadium; Tempe, AZ	ESPN	W 61–55 ^{3OT}	56,534
November 7	7:30 pm	California^{†}		Autzen Stadium; Eugene, OR	ESPN2	W 44–28	56,604
November 14	4:30 pm	at No. 7 Stanford		Stanford Stadium; Stanford, CA (rivalry)	FOX	W 38–36	48,633
November 21	12:30 pm	No. 24 USC	No. 23	Autzen Stadium; Eugene, OR (rivalry)	ESPN	W 48–28	59,094
November 27	1:00 pm	Oregon State	No. 17	Autzen Stadium; Eugene, OR (Civil War)	FS1	W 52–42	57,814
January 2, 2016	3:45 pm	vs. No. 11 TCU*	No. 15	Alamodome; San Antonio, TX (Alamo Bowl)	ESPN	L 41–47 ^{3OT}	64,569
*Non-conference game; ^{†}Homecoming; Rankings from AP Poll and CFP Rankings after November 3 released prior to game; All times are in Pacific time

== Rankings ==
Ranking movements Legend: ██ Increase in ranking ██ Decrease in ranking — = Not ranked RV = Received votes
	Week															
Poll	Pre	1	2	3	4	5	6	7	8	9	10	11	12	13	14	Final
AP	7	7	12	13	RV	RV	—	—	—	—	—	23	18	15	15	19
Coaches	5	5	13	13	24	RV	—	RV	RV	RV	RV	22	18	16	14	20
CFP	Not released									—	—	23	17	16	15	Not released

== Personnel ==
Oregon head coach Mark Helfrich returns in his third year as Oregon's head coach following season.

The Ducks continue to have the longest tenured staff of any college football program in the United States. Six of the ten assistant positions are staffed by men who have coached at Oregon for over ten years, four of whom have over 25 years of experience as Oregon assistant coaches.

Offensive coordinator Scott Frost was hired by the University of Central Florida Knights football team on December 1, 2015.

=== Roster ===
2015 Oregon Ducks football team roster
Players
Coaches
Offense

Pos.	#	Name	Class
WR	2	Bralon Addison	Jr
QB	3	Vernon Adams	Sr
WR	4	Alex Ofodile	Fr
RB	5	Taj Griffin	Fr
WR	6	Charles Nelson	So
WR	7	Darren Carrington	So
WR	9	Byron Marshall (injured)	Sr
QB	11	Travis Jonsen	Fr
QB	12	Taylor Alie	So
WR	13	Devon Allen	So
WR	15	Jalen Brown	Fr
QB	16	Morgan Mahalak	Fr
QB	17	Jeff Lockie	Jr
RB	20	Tony Brooks-James	Fr
RB	21	Royce Freeman	So
WR	22	Jeff Bieber	Fr
WR	23	Malik Lovette	Fr
RB	26	Casey Eugenio	Fr
TE	27	Jake Breeland	Fr
WR	28	Chayce Maday	Fr
RB	29	Kani Benoit	So
WR	33	Kirk Merritt	Fr
RB	34	Lane Roseberry	Jr
RB	37	J.J. Jones	Jr
TE	40	Taylor Stinson	Fr
RB	41	Jarret LaCoste	Jr
OL	54	Calvin Throckmorton	Fr
OL	57	Doug Brenner	So
OL	60	Jim Weber	Fr
OL	61	Jake Hanson	Fr
OL	62	Matt Pierson	Sr
OL	63	Davis Miyashiro-Saipaia	Fr
OL	64	Tyler Johnstone	Sr
OL	66	Brady Aiello	Fr
OL	67	Tanner Davies	Fr
OL	68	Shane Lemieux	Fr
OL	70	Matthew McFadden	Jr
OL	72	Matt Hegarty	Sr
OL	73	Tyrell Crosby	So
OL	74	Elijah George	So
OL	75	Zach Okun	Fr
OL	76	Jake Pisarcik	So
OL	77	Haniteli Lousi	Sr
OL	78	Cameron Hunt	Jr
OL	79	Evan Voeller	So
TE	80	Koa Ka’ai	Sr
TE	81	Evan Baylis	Jr
WR	82	Zac Schuller	Sr
TE	83	Johnny Mundt	Jr
TE	85	Pharaoh Brown (injured)	Sr
WR	88	Dwayne Stanford	Jr
WR	89	Chris Tewhill	Jr
TE	90	Jake McCreath	Jr

Defense

Pos.	#	Name	Class
CB	1	Arrion Springs	So
S	3	Tyree Robinson	So
S	8	Reggie Daniels	Jr
DL	9	Gus Cumberlander	Fr
CB	10	Ty Griffin	So
LB	11	Justin Hollins	So
CB	12	Chris Seisay	So
CB	14	Ugo Amadi	Fr
CB	16	Dylan Kane	Fr
S	17	Juwaan Williams	So
LB	18	Jimmie Swain	So
S	19	Austin Daich	Jr
CB	22	Jihree Stewart	Fr
S	25	Glen Ihenacho	Fr
S	26	Kahlil Oliver	Fr
CB	27	Mattrell McGraw	Fr
LB	28	Johnny Ragin III	Jr
CB	29	Tyler Reid	Fr
LB	30	Paris Bostick	So
LB	32	Eddie Heard Jr.	Jr
LB	33	Tyson Coleman	Sr
LB	35	Joe Walker	Sr
LB	36	Justin Hunter	Fr
CB	37	Michael Manns	Jr
DL	42	Cody Carriger	Jr
S	43	Fotu Leiato	Fr
DL	44	DeForest Buckner	Sr
DE	45	T.J. Daniel	Jr
LB	46	Danny Mattingly	So
DL	47	Rex Manu	Fr
LB	48	Rodney Hardrick	Sr
DL	50	Austin Maloata	So
LB	52	Ivan Faulhaber	So
LB	54	De'Quan McDowell	Jr
DL	55	Tui Talia	Sr
DL	56	Alex Balducci	Sr
LB	86	Torrodney Prevot	Jr
DE	90	Drayton Carlberg	Fr
DE	92	Henry Mondeaux	So
DL	93	Jason Sloan	So
DL	95	Spencer Stark	Fr
LB	96	Christian French	Sr
DL	97	Jalen Jelks	Fr
DL	98	Jordan Kurahara	Fr

Special teams

Pos.	#	Name	Class
P	38	Ian Wheeler	So
PK	40	Jesse Kelly	Fr
PK	41	Aidan Schneider	So
PK	49	Matt Wogan	Jr
LS	53	Connor Johnson	So
LS	58	Tanner Carew	So
LS	66	Devin Melendez	So
PK	93	Alec Eickert	Jr

Head coach

- Mark Helfrich (3rd season)

Coordinators/assistant coaches

Offense

- Matt Lubick – Offensive coordinator & wide receivers (1st season)*
- Scott Frost – Offensive coordinator & quarterbacks (3rd season; resigned December 1, 2015)
- Steve Greatwood – Running game coordinator & offensive line (30th season)
- Gary Campbell – Running backs (34th season)
- Tom Osborne – Special Teams Coordinator & tight ends (16th season)

Defense

- Don Pellum – Defensive coordinator & inside linebackers (2nd season)
- Ron Aiken – Defensive line (3rd season)
- Erik Chinander – Outside linebackers (2nd season)
- John Neal – Passing Game Coordinator & Secondary (14th season)
- Jim Radcliffe – Strength and conditioning (32nd season)

Legend

- (C) Team captain
- (S) Suspended
- (I) Ineligible
- Injured
- Redshirt

Roster
Last update: 11:12, 12 August 2014 (UTC)

=== Depth chart ===
Defense

FS
Charles Nelson
Khalil Oliver

OLB	ILB	ILB	OLB
Christian French	Joe Walker	Rodney Hardrick	Tyson Coleman
Eddie Heard	Jimmie Swain or Danny Mattingly	Johnny Ragin III	Torrodney Prevot

SS
Reggie Daniels
Glen Ihenacho or Juwaan Williams

CB
Tyree Robinson
Ugo Amadi

DE	NT	DE
Tui Talia	Alex Balducci	DeForest Buckner
Henry Mondeaux	Austin Maloata	TJ Daniels or Canton Kaumatule

CB
Arrion Springs
Ty Griffin

Offense

WR
Dwayne Stanford
Darren Carrington

WR
Bralon Addison
Kirk Merritt

LT	LG	C	RG	RT
Tyler Johnstone	Matt Pierson	Matt Hegarty	Cameron Hunt	Tyrell Crosby
Elijah George	Evan Voeller	Doug Brenner	Jake Pisarcik	Evan Voller

TE
Evan Baylis
Johnny Mundt

WR
Devon Allen
Jalen Brown

QB
Vernon Adams
Jeff Lockie or Taylor Alie

RB
Royce Freeman
Kani Benoit

Special teams
PK Aidan Schneider
PK Matt Wogan
P Ian Wheeler
P Blake Malmone
KR Bralon Addison
PR Bralon Addison
LS Tanner Carew
H Taylor Alie

== Game summaries ==
=== Eastern Washington ===
Eastern Washington Eagles at #7 Oregon Ducks – Game summary

Quarter	1	2	3	4	Total
Eastern Washington	7	14	14	7	42
#7 Oregon	20	17	17	7	61

at Autzen Stadium • Eugene, OR

- Date: Saturday September 5, 2015
- Game time: 5 p.m.
- Game weather: 69°F • Wind: Calm • Partly Sunny
- Game attendance: 58,128
- Referee: Land Clark Umpire: Matt Jordan Head Linesman: Bob Day Line Judge: Jeff Robinson Back Judge: Justin Nelson Field Judge: John Morton Side Judge: Bernie Hulscher Scorekeeper: John Love
- TV: Pac-12 Network

Game information

First quarter

- ORE – Kani Benoit 8-yard run (Two-Point Conversion Failed)
- ORE – Bralon Addison 6-yard pass from Vernon Adams (Aiden Schneider Kick)
- EWU – Shaq Hill 12-yard pass from Jordan West (Tyler McNannay Kick)
- ORE – Royce Freeman 1-yard run (Schneider Kick)

Second quarter

- ORE – Tony Brooks-James 12-yard run (Schneider Kick)
- EWU – Kendrick Bourne 2-yard pass from West (McNannay Kick)
- ORE – Freeman 3-yard run (Schneider Kick)
- ORE – Cooper Kupp 16-yard pass from West (McNannay Kick)
- ORE – Schneider 38-yard field goal

Third quarter

- ORE – Freeman 1-yard run (Schneider Kick)
- EWU – Kupp 1-yard pass from Reilly Hennessey (McNannay Kick)
- ORE – Byron Marshall 24-yard pass from Adams (Schneider Kick)
- EWU – Jabari Wilson 3-yard run (McNannay Kick)
- ORE – Schneider 30-yard field goal

Fourth quarter

- ORE – Brooks-James 15-yard run (Schneider Kick)
- EWU – Kupp 7-yard pass from Hennessey (McNannay Kick)

Passing

- EWU – Jordan West, 23–43, 293 yards, 3TD, INT
- UO – Vernon Adams, 19–25, 246 yards, 2TD

Rushing

- EWU – Jabari Wilson, 10 carries, 43 yards, TD
- UO – Royce Freeman, 21 carries, 180 yards, 3TD

Receiving

- EWU – Cooper Kupp, 15 receptions, 246 yards, 3TD
- UO – Byron Marshall, 4 receptions, 69 yards, TD

Defense†

- UO – Chris Seisay, 9 tackles, 1 TFL, 1 INT

Kicking

- EWU – Tyler McNannay, 5/5 PAT
- UO – Aidan Schneider, 2/2 FG, 38-yard long, 7/7 PAT

special teams

- EWU – Simba Webster, 3 KR, 70 yards
- UO – Byron Marshall, 3 KR, 99 yards

†Neither ESPN nor the Pac-12 recorded EWU defensive statistics.

In their first game of the 2015 season, the Ducks defeated the Eastern Washington Eagles 61–42 in the teams' first ever matchup in football.

In an interesting twist to an otherwise typical early season matchup against a local FCS power, Eastern Washington's former star quarterback Vernon Adams graduated in the summer of 2015 and transferred to the University of Oregon in order to pursue his graduate studies and utilize his final year of eligibility as the Ducks' starting quarterback.

=== Michigan State ===
Oregon Ducks at Michigan State Spartans – Game summary

Quarter	1	2	3	4	Total
#7 Oregon	7	0	7	14	28
#5 Michigan State	7	7	10	7	31

at Spartan Stadium • East Lansing, MI

- Date: Saturday September 12, 2015
- Game time: 5 p.m.
- Game weather: 56°F • Wind: NE 4 • Partly Cloudy
- Game attendance: 76,256
- Referee: Michael Batlan Umpire: Rick DiBernardo Linesman: Dan Antonietti Line judge: Rich Troyer Back judge: Joe Johnston Field judge: Steve Currie Side judge: Michael Marsh Center judge: Randy Campbell
- TV: ABC

Game information

First quarter

- ORE – Royce Freeman 2-yard run (Aiden Schneider Kick)
- MSU – Josiah Price 12-yard pass from Connor Cook (Michael Geiger Kick)

Second quarter

- MSU – Aaron Burbridge 17-yard pass from Cook (Geiger Kick)

Third quarter

- ORE – Bralon Addison 81-yard punt return (Schneider Kick)
- MSU – LJ Scott 6-yard run (Geiger Kick)
- MSU – Geiger 28-yard field goal

Fourth quarter

- ORE – Vernon Adams 2-yard run (Schneider Kick)
- MSU – LJ Scott 38-yard run (Geiger Kick)
- ORE – Byron Marshall 15-yard pass from Adams (Schneider Kick)

Passing

- ORE – Vernon Adams, 22/39, 309 yards, TD, 2 INT
- MSU – Connor Cook, 20/32, 192 yards, 2 TD, INT

Rushing

- ORE –[Royce Freeman, 24 carries, 92 yards, TD
- MSU – Madre London, 18 carries, 103 yards

Receiving

- ORE – Bralon Addison, 7 receptions, 138 yards
- MSU – Aaron Burbridge, 8 receptions, 101 yards, TD

Defense

- ORE – Arrion Springs, 13 tackles
- MSU – Riley Bullough, 14 tackles

Kicking

- ORE – Aiden Schneider, 4/4 XP
- MSU – Michael Geiger, 1/2 FG, 28-yard long, 4/4 XP

special teams

- ORE – Bralon Addison, 4 PR, 102 yards
- MSU – LJ Scott, 1 KR, 25 yards

For their first away game of the season, the Ducks lost to the Michigan State Spartans 31–28 at Spartan Stadium in East Lansing. The game was a rematch from the previous season when the Ducks beat the Spartans at Autzen Stadium in Eugene. The loss returned the all-time record between Oregon and Michigan State to a tie at 3–3.

This game foreshadowed the finger injury that would keep Oregon quarterback Vernon Adams Jr. sidelined or completely ineffective for a month. Adams injured the index finger on his throwing hand during the fourth quarter of the previous week's game against Eastern Washington. For the game against Michigan State, Adams wore gloves on both hands and was seen inspecting his hand while on the sideline. It was conjectured during the game by the announcers that the lack of touch caused by both his broken finger and the glove were to blame for several inaccurate medium to long distance passes thrown by Adams, including missing a wide open Byron Marshall in the end-zone from the Michigan State 33-yard line with 1:24 left in the game that would've put the Ducks up 35–31.

=== Georgia State ===
Georgia State Panthers at Oregon Ducks – Game summary

Quarter	1	2	3	4	Total
Georgia State	7	0	21	0	28
#12 Oregon	13	20	14	14	61

at Autzen Stadium • Eugene, OR

- Date: Saturday September 19, 2015
- Game time: 11 a.m.
- TV: Pac-12 Network

Game information

First quarter

- ORE – Tyree Robinson 41-yard interception return (Aiden Schneider Kick)
- ORE – Schneider 26-yard field goal
- ORE – Schneider 40-yard field goal
- GSU – Nick Arbuckle 1-yard run (Wil Lutz Kick)

Second quarter

- ORE – Royce Freeman 22-yard run (Schneider Kick)
- ORE – Dwayne Stanford 35-yard pass from Jeff Lockie (Schneider Kick)
- ORE – Schneider 40-yard field goal
- ORE – Schneider 40-yard field goal

Third quarter

- GSU – Todd Boyd 14-yard pass from Arbuckle (Lutz Kick)
- ORE – Taj Griffin 3-yard run (Schneider Kick)
- GSU – Robert Davis 75-yard pass from Arbuckle (Lutz Kick)
- ORE – Johnny Mundt 11-yard pass from Lockie (Schneider Kick)
- GSU – Keith Rucker 6-yard pass from Arbuckle (Lutz Kick)

Fourth quarter

- ORE – Joe Walker 52-yard fumble return (Schneider Kick)
- ORE – Taylor Alie 87-yard run (Schneider Kick)

Passing

- GSU – Nick Arbuckle, 25/32, 318 yards, 3 TD, 2 INT
- UO – Jeff Lockie, 23/32, 228 yards, 2 TD

Rushing

- GSU – Demarcus Kick, 6 carries, 42 yards
- UO – Royce Freeman, 10 carries, 101 yards, TD

Receiving

- GSU – Penny Hart, 9 receptions, 128 yards
- UO – Dwayne Stanford, 3 receptions, 48 yards, TD

Defense

- GSU – Tarris Batiste, 10 tackles, 3 TFL
- UO – DeForest Buckner, 7 tackles, 1.5 sacks, 2 TFL

Kicking

- GSU – Wil Lutz, 0/1 FG, 4/4 XP
- UO – Aiden Schneider, 4/4 FG, 40-yard long, 7/7 XP

special teams

- GSU – Glenn Smith, 2 KR, 45 yards
- UO – Charles Nelson, 1 KR, 50 yards

Oregon defeated the Georgia State Panthers 61–28 in its final non-conference home game of the 2015 season. This game was the first meeting between Oregon and Georgia State.

Oregon quarterback Vernon Adams Jr. did not start in this game due to a broken index finger on his throwing hand, Jeff Lockie, the longtime backup to Marcus Mariota, started in his place.

=== Utah ===
Utah Utes at Oregon Ducks – Game summary

Quarter	1	2	3	4	Total
#18 Utah	6	21	28	7	62
#13 Oregon	6	7	0	7	20

at Autzen Stadium • Eugene, OR

- Date: Saturday September 26, 2015
- Game time: 5:35 pm PST
- Game weather: Clear
- Game attendance: 57,174

Game information

First quarter

- UTAH – Andy Philips 28-yard field goal
- UTAH – Philips 44-yard field goal
- ORE – Royce Freeman 13-yard pass from Vernon Adams (Two-point attempt failed)

Second quarter

- UTAH – Britain Covey 26-yard pass from Travis Wilson (Philips Kick)
- UTAH – Kenneth Scott 7-yard pass from Wilson (Philips Kick)
- ORE – Bralon Addison 6-yard pass from Jeff Lockie (Aidan Schneider Kick)
- UTAH – Caleb Repp 9-yard pass from Wilson (Philips Kick)

Third quarter

- UTAH – Wilson 2-yard run (Philips Kick)
- UTAH – Covey 25-yard pass from Devontae Booker (Philips Kick)
- UTAH – Repp 16-yard pass from Wilson (Philips Kick)
- UTAH – Boobie Hobbs 69-yard punt return (Philips Kick)

Fourth quarter

- UTAH – Kendal Thompson 6-yard run (Philips Kick)
- ORE – Taylor Alie 14-yard run (Schneider Kick)

Passing

- UTAH – Travis Wilson, 18/30, 227 yards, 4 TD
- UO – Jeff Lockie, 10/20, 139 yards, TD, 2 INT

Rushing

- UTAH – Travis Wilson, 6 carries, 100 yards, TD
- UO – Royce Freeman, 14 carries, 77 yards

Receiving

- UTAH – Kenneth Scott, 6 receptions, 75 yards, TD
- UO – Royce Freeman, 2 receptions, 46 yards, TD

Defense

- UTAH – Hayden Clegg, 6 tackles
- UO – Tyson Coleman, 6 tackles, 1 TFL

Kicking

- UTAH – Andy Phillips, 2/2 FG, 44 yard long, 8/8 XP
- UO – Aidan Schneider, 2/2 XP

special teams

- UTAH – Boobie Hobbs, 1 PR, 69 yards, TD
- UO – Byron Marshall, 7 KR, 178 yards

In their first Pac-12 game of the season, the Ducks lost in historic fashion to the Utah Utes by a score of 62–20. In 2014, Oregon defeated Utah 51–27 at Rice Eccles Stadium in Salt Lake City, UT. Oregon maintained their lead in the all-time series with 20–9; this was the first time that Utah defeated Oregon since joining the Pac-12.

The 42 point loss was the third largest margin of defeat for the Ducks at Autzen Stadium, with the 62 points the most ever allowed by the Ducks in Eugene and the first loss of this magnitude at home since the 1977 season. During the game, Oregon star wide receiver/running back Byron Marshall suffered a lower leg injury and was driven off the field in a cart. Additionally, during the second quarter the Ducks replaced starting quarterback Vernon Adams Jr. with Jeff Lockie due to Adams' ineffective play caused by a broken index finger on his throwing hand. Because of the broken finger, Adams was unable to complete accurate downfield passes which allowed the Utes to totally focus on defending the run and short passes, effectively neutralizing the Oregon offense. While Lockie was able to generate a spark on his first series, he was unable to generate significant plays.

=== Colorado ===
Oregon Ducks at Colorado Buffaloes – Game summary

Quarter	1	2	3	4	Total
Oregon	7	10	14	10	41
Colorado	7	10	0	7	24

at Folsom Field • Boulder, CO

- Date: Saturday October 3, 2015
- Game time: 8:35 pm
- Game weather: Cloudy
- TV: ESPN

Game information

First quarter

- ORE – Royce Freeman 29-yard run (Aidan Schneider Kick)
- COL – Christian Powell 2-yard run (Diego Gonzalez Kick)

Second quarter

- COL – Shay fields 8-yard pass from Sefo Liufau (Gonzalez Kick)
- ORE – Charles Nelson 39-yard pass from Bralon Addison (Schneider Kick)
- COL – Gonzalez 52-yard field goal
- ORE – Schneider 39-yard field goal

Third quarter

- ORE – Freeman 3-yard run (Schneider Kick)
- ORE – Taj Griffin 2-yard run (Schneider Kick)

Fourth quarter

- COL – Sefo Liufau 7-yard run (Gonzalez Kick)
- ORE – Jalen Brown 43-yard pass from Taylor Alie (Schneider Kick)
- ORE – Schneider 33-yard field goal

Passing

- UO – Taylor Alie, 4/9, 83 yards, TD
- UC – Sefo Liufau, 25/42, 231 yards, TD, INT

Rushing

- UO – Royce Freeman, 27 carries, 163 yards, 2 TD
- UC – Phillip Lindsay, 12 carries, 37 yards

Receiving

- UO – Charles Nelson, 2 receptions, 44 yards, YD
- UC – Nelson Spruce, 6 receptions, 87 yards

Defense

- UO – Rodney Hardrick, 8 tackles, 1 sack, 2 TFL
- UC – Chidobe Awuzie, 11 tackles

Kicking

- UO – Aidan Schneieder, 2/2 FG, 39-yard long, 5/5 XP
- UC – Diego Gonzalez, 1/1 FG, 52-yard long, 3/3 XP

special teams

- UO – Charles Nelson, 4 KR, 144 yards
- UC – Donovan Lee, 1 KR, 24 yards

In their first game playing as an unranked team since the 2009 season, the Ducks defeated the Colorado Buffaloes 41–24 at Folsom Field in Boulder. The win extended Oregon's lead in the all-time series to 12–8; they remained undefeated against the Buffaloes in Pac-12 play.

Vernon Adams Jr. remained on the sidelines due to a broken index finger and the fact that he has sickle cell trait; Folsom Field is 5,360 feet (1,630 m) above sea level. In his place, the Ducks ran a rotation at the quarterback position, playing both long-time backup Jeff Lockie and Taylor Alie, a walk-on who won a 6A Oregon State Championship with Sheldon High School in Eugene.

=== Washington State ===
Washington State Cougars at Oregon Ducks – Game summary

Quarter	1	2	3	4	OT	2OT	Total
Washington State	7	7	7	10	7	7	45
Oregon	10	7	7	7	7	0	38

at Autzen Stadium • Eugene, OR

- Date: Saturday October 10, 2015
- Game time: 3:00 pm
- Game weather: 67°F • Wind: W 17 • Mostly Cloudy, Light Rain
- TV: Pac-12 Network

Game information

First quarter

- WSU – Gabe Marks 7 yard pass from Luke Falk (Erik Powell Kick)
- ORE – Aidan Schneider 26-yard field goal
- ORE – Taylor Alie 8-yard run (Schneider Kick)

Second quarter

- ORE – Royce Freeman 2-yard run (Schneider Kick)
- WSU – Marks 4-yard pass from Falk (Powell Kick)

Third quarter

- WSU – Tavares Martin Jr. 27-yard pass from Falk (Powell Kick)
- ORE – Freeman 17-yard pass from Jeff Lockie (Schneider Kick)

Fourth quarter

- ORE – Freeman 1-yard run (Schneider Kick)
- WSU – Powell 22-yard field goal
- WSU – Dom Williams 8-yard pass from Falk (Powell Kick)

First Overtime

- ORE – Bralon Addison 8-yard pass from Lockie (Schneider Kick)
- WSU – Falk 1-yard run (Powell Kick)

Second Overtime

- WSU – Robert Lewis 4-yard pass from Falk (Powell Kick)

Passing

- WSU – Luke Falk, 50/74, 505 yards, 5 TD
- UO – Jeff Lockie, 13/22, 123 yards, 2 TD, INT

Rushing

- WSU – Jamal Morrow, 8 carries, 68 yards
- UO – Royce Freeman, 27 carries, 246 yards, 2 TD

Receiving

- WSU – Gabe Marks, 8 receptions, 111 yards, 2 TD
- UO – Bralon Addison, 8 receptions, 62 yards, TD

Defense

- WSU – Parker Henry, 8 tackles, 2 TFL
- UO – Charles Nelson, 12 tackles

Kicking

- WSU – Erik Powell, 1/2 FG, 22-yard long, 6/6 XP
- UO – Aidan Schneider, 1/1 FG, 26-yard long, 5/5 XP

special teams

- WSU – Gabe Marks, 4 PR, 30 yards
- UO – Bralon Addison, 3 KR, 15 yards, 1 PR, 2 yards

In their first division game of the season, the Ducks lost to the Washington State Cougars 45–38 in Autzen Stadium in double overtime. The loss marked their first season with multiple home losses since the 2007 season. Oregon maintained their lead in the all-time series with 49–37-7.

=== Washington ===
Oregon Ducks at Washington Huskies – Game summary

Quarter	1	2	3	4	Total
Oregon	6	10	7	3	26
Washington	0	3	10	7	20

at Husky Stadium • Seattle, WA

- Date: Saturday October 17, 2015
- Game time: 7:30 p.m.

Game information

First quarter

- ORE – Darren Carrington 36-yard pass from Vernon Adams (2-point attempt failed)

Second quarter

- ORE – Bralon Addison 8-yard run (Aidan Schneider Kick)
- UW – Cameron Van Winkle 40-yard field goal
- ORE – Schneider 28-yard field goal

Third quarter

- UW – Van Winkle 46-yard field goal
- ORE – Carrington 9-yard pass from Adams (Schneider Kick)
- UW – Myles Gaskin 72-yard run (Van Winkle Kick)

Fourth quarter

- ORE – Schneider 24-yard field goal
- UW – Jaydon Mickens 3-yard pass from Jake Browning (Van Winkle Kick)

Passing

- UO – Vernon Adams, 14/25, 272 yards, 2 TD
- UW – Jake Browning, 19/30, 199 yards, TD

Rushing

- UO – Royce Freeman, 27 carries, 138 yards
- UW – Myles Gaskin, 18 carries, 155 yards, TD

Receiving

- UO – Darren Carrington, 5 receptions, 125 yards, 2 TD
- UW – Dante Pettis, 4 receptions 65 yards

Defense

- UO – Tyree Robinson, 11 tackles
- UW – Budda Baker, 8 tackles, 1 TFL

Kicking

- UO – Aiden Schneieder, 2/3 FG, 28-yard long, 2/2 XP
- UW – Cameron Van Winkle, 2/2 FG, 46-yard long, 2/2 XP

special teams

- UO – Bralon Addison, 2 KR, 106 yards, 3 PR, 30 yards
- UW – Chico McClatcher, 4 KR, 102 yards

Oregon defeated their rival, the Washington Huskies, 26–20 for the twelfth year in a row at Husky Stadium in Seattle. The game featured a healthy Vernon Adams Jr. playing for the Ducks for the first time since their first game of the season; in 2014, Adams almost led his former Eastern Washington team to a major upset of the Huskies, throwing for seven touchdowns and accounting for just under 500 yards from scrimmage. Despite the win, Washington maintained their overall series lead, 58–46–6.

=== Arizona State ===
Oregon Ducks at Arizona State Sun Devils – Game summary

Quarter	1	2	3	4	OT	2OT	3OT	Total
Oregon	10	7	17	7	7	7	6	61
Arizona State	0	14	17	10	7	7	0	55

at Sun Devil Stadium • Tempe, AZ

- Date: Thursday October 29, 2015
- Game time: 7:30 p.m.
- TV: ESPN

Game information

First quarter

- ORE – Aidan Schneider 24-yard field goal
- ORE – Royce Freeman 64-yard run (Schneider Kick)

Second quarter

- ASU – Devin Lucien 3-yard pass from Mike Bercovici (Zane Gonzalez Kick)
- ORE – Darren Carrington 39-yard pass from Vernon Adams (Schneider Kick)
- ASU – Gary Chambers 39-yard pass from Bercovici (Gonzalez Kick)

Third quarter

- ASU – Gonzalez 28-yard field goal
- ASU – Demario Richard 22-yard run (Gonzalez Kick)
- ORE – Schneider 37-yard field goal
- ASU – Richard 1-yard pass rom Bercovici (Gonzalez Kick)
- ORE – Charles Nelson 100-yard kickoff return (Schneider Kick)
- ORE – Kani Benoit 62-yard run (Schneider Kick)

Fourth quarter

- ASU – Gonzalez 33-yard field goal
- ASU – Kody Kohl 5-yard pass from Bercovici (Gonzalez Kick)
- ORE – Dwayne Stanford 8-yard pass from Adams (Schneider Kick)

First Overtime

- ORE – Stanford 25-yard pass from Adams (Schneider Kick)
- ASU – Tim White 2-yard pass from Bercovici (Gonzalez Kick)

Second Overtime

- ASU – Bercovici 18-yard run (Gonzalez Kick)
- ORE – Freeman 1-yard run (Schneider Kick)

Third Overtime†

- ORE – Bralon Addison 20-yard pass from Vernon Adams (Two-Point Attempt Failed)

†Beginning with the third overtime period, two-point attempts after touchdowns are mandatory.

Passing

- UO – Vernon Adams, 23/40, 315 yards, 4 TD, INT
- ASU – Mike Bercovici, 32/53, 398 yards, 5 TD, 2 INT

Rushing

- UO – Royce Freeman, 15 carries, 112 yards, 2 TD
- ASU – Demario Richard, 19 carries, 135 yards, TD

Receiving

- UO – Darren Carrington, 5 receptions, 107 yards, TD
- ASU – Tim White, 9 receptions, 97 yards, TD

Defense

- UO – Charles Nelson, 14 tackles
- ASU – Jordan Simone, 10 tackles, 1 sack, 1 TFL

Kicking

- UO – Aidan Schneider, 2/2 FG, 37-yard long, 7/7 XP
- ASU – Zane Gonzalez, 2/5 FG, 33-yard long, 7/7 XP

special teams

- UO – Charles Nelson, 4 KR, 185 yards, TD
- ASU – Tim White, 2 KR, 52 yards

In their sole Thursday night game of the season, the Ducks defeated the Arizona State Sun Devils 61–55 in a thrilling and at times controversial triple overtime game in Sun Devil Stadium. The win extended Oregon's active win streak over the Sun Devils to seven, though they did not play in 2013 or 2014, and their lead in the all-time series to 18–16.

The jerseys worn by the Sun Devils all bore the name Tillman in order to honor Arizona State alumnus Pat Tillman. Tillman played safety for the Sun Devils from 1994 to 1997 and was drafted 226th overall by the Arizona Cardinals in the 1998 NFL draft. Following the terrorist attacks on September 11, 2001, Tillman declined to sign a new contract with the Cardinals in order to enlist in the Army, eventually becoming a Ranger; he was killed by friendly fire while serving in Afghanistan on April 22, 2004.

=== California ===
California Golden Bears at Oregon Ducks – Game summary

Quarter	1	2	3	4	Total
California	10	0	11	7	28
Oregon	3	28	3	10	44

at Autzen Stadium • Eugene, OR

- Date: Saturday November 7, 2015
- Game attendance: 56,604

Game information

First quarter

- CAL – Stephen Anderson 7-yard pass from Jared Goff (Matt Anderson Kick)
- CAL – Anderson 27-yard field goal
- ORE – Aidan Schneider 41-yard field goal

Second quarter

- ORE – Vernon Adams 10-yard run (Schneider Kick)
- ORE – Bralon Addison 28-yard pass from Adams (Schneider Kick)
- ORE – Dwayne Stanford 10-yard pass from Adams (Schneider Kick)
- ORE – Bralon Addison 15-yard pass from Adams (Schneider Kick)

Third quarter

- CAL – Anderson 48-yard field goal
- CAL – Vic Enwere 9-yard run (Goff run for 2-Point Conversion)
- ORE – Schneider 21-yard field goal

Fourth quarter

- ORE – Charles Nelson 20-yard pass from Adams (Schneider Kick)
- CAL – Bryce Teggs 80-yard pass from Goff (Anderson Kick)
- ORE – Schneider 19-yard field goal

Passing

- CAL – Jared Goff, 18/41, 329 yards, 2 TD, INT
- UO – Vernon Adams, 17/29, 300 yards, 4 TD, 2 INT

Rushing

- CAL – Vic Enwere. 9 carries, 68 yards, TD
- UO – Royce Freeman, 29 carries, 180 yards

Receiving

- CAL – Bryce Treggs, 2 receptions, 112 yards, TD
- UO – Darren Carrington, 4 receptions, 112 yards

Defense

- CAL – Hardy Nickerson Jr., 13 tackles, 1 sack, 1 TFL
- UO – Tyree Robinson, 7 tackles, 1 sack, 1 TFL

Kicking

- CAL – Matt Anderson, 2/2 FG, ?-yard long, 2/2 XP
- UO – Aidan Schneider, 3/3 FG, ?-yard long, 5/5 XP

special teams

- CAL – Trevor Davis, 4 KR, 100 yards
- UO – Charles Nelson, 3 KR, 52 yards

In their ninth game of the season, the Ducks earned bowl eligibility by defeating the California Golden Bears 44–28 at Autzen Stadium. The Ducks extended their 6-year win streak over California; however, the Golden Bears maintained their all-time series lead, 39–37–2.

=== Stanford ===
Oregon Ducks at Stanford Cardinal – Game summary

Quarter	1	2	3	4	Total
Oregon	14	7	14	3	38
#7 Stanford	10	13	0	13	36

at Stanford Stadium • Stanford, CA

- Date: Saturday November 14, 2015

Game information

First quarter

- STAN – Conrad Ukropina 33-yard field goal
- UO – Kani Benoit 2-yard run (Aidan Schneider Kick)
- STAN – Kevin Hogan 22-yard run (Ukropina Kick)
- UO – Charles Nelson 75-yard run (Schneider Kick)

Second quarter

- STAN – Christian McCaffrey 11-yard run (Ukropina Kick)
- STAN – Ukropina 24-yard field goal
- UO – Charles Nelson 47-yard pass from Vernon Adams (Schneider Kick)
- STAN – Ukropina 49-yard field goal

Third quarter

- UO – Royce Freeman 19-yard run (Schneider Kick)
- UO – Taj Griffin 49-yard pass from Vernon Adams

Fourth quarter

- STAN – Greg Taboada 3-yard pass from Hogan (Ukropina Kick)
- UO – Schneider 31-yard field goal
- STAN – Greg Taboada 4-yard pass from Hogan (Two-Point Pass Conversion Failed)

Passing

- UO – Vernon Adams, 10/12, 205 yards, 2 TD
- STAN – Kevin Hogan, 28/37, 304 yards, 2 TD, INT

Rushing

- UO – Royce Freeman, 16 carries, 105 yards, TD
- STAN – Christian McCaffrey, 33 carries, 147 yards, TD

Receiving

- UO – Darren Carrington, 2 receptions, 54 yards, TD
- STAN – Michael Rector, 8 receptions, 103 yards

Defense

- UO – Rodney Hardrick, 11 tackles, INT
- STAN – Kevin Anderson, 6 tackles, 2 TFL

Kicking

- UO – Aidan Schneider, 1/1 FG, 31 yard long, 5/5 XP
- STAN – Conrad Ukropina, 3/4 FG, 49 yard long, 3/3 XP

special teams

- UO – Charles Nelson, 3 KR, 59 yards
- STAN – Christian McCaffrey, 2 KR, 60 yards, 1 PR, -5 yards

Oregon defeated the 7th ranked Stanford Cardinal 38–36 on the road in Stanford Stadium. Despite the win, the Cardinal maintained their lead in the all-time series, 46–32–1.

=== USC ===
USC Trojans at Oregon Ducks – Game summary

Quarter	1	2	3	4	Total
#22 USC	7	7	14	0	28
#23 Oregon	14	17	7	10	48

at Autzen Stadium • Eugene, OR

- Date: Saturday November 21, 2015

Game information

First quarter

- UO – Bralon Addison 48-yard pass from Vernon Adams (Aidan Schneider Kick)
- USC – D. Rogers 27-yard pass from Cody Kessler (M. Boermaster Kick)
- UO – Evan Baylis 52-yard pass from Adams (Schneider Kick)

Second quarter

- USC – Tyler Petite 12-yard pass from Kessler (Boermaster Kick)
- UO – Darren Carrington 37-yard pass from Adams (Schneider Kick)
- UO – Kani Benoit 30-yard pass from Adams (Schneider Kick)
- UO – Schneider 37-yard field goal

Third quarter

- UO – Dwayne Stanford 21-yard pass from Adams (Schneider Kick)
- USC – Ronald Jones II 12-yard run (Boermaster Kick)
- USC – A. Jackson 41-yard punt return (Boermaster Kick)

Fourth quarter

- UO – Charles Nelson 26-yard pass from

Passing

- USC – Cody Kessler, 30/41, 238 yards, 2 TD
- UO – Vernon Adams Jr., 20/25, 407 yards, 6 TD, INT

Rushing

- USC – Justin Davis, 16 carries, 141 yards
- UO – Royce Freeman, 20 carries, 147 yards

Receiving

- USC – JuJu Smith-Schuster, 5 receptions, 57 yards
- UO – Bralon Addison, 5 receptions 105 yards, TD

Defense

- USC –
- UO –

Kicking

- USC – Matt Boermaster, 4/4 XP
- UO – Aidan Schneider, 2/2 FG, 37 yard long, 6/6 XP

special teams

- USC – Justin Davis, 2 KR, 59 yards
- UO – Charles Nelson, 5 KR, 114 yards

Oregon defeated the USC Trojans 48–28 at home in their 8th win of the year. With the win, Oregon remained in the Pac-12 North championship race until Stanford defeated California later that day to clinch the division title. The Trojans maintained their lead in the overall series, 37–20–2.

=== Oregon State ===
Oregon State Beavers at #18 Oregon Ducks – Game summary

Quarter	1	2	3	4	Total
Oregon State	7	0	14	21	42
#18 Oregon	14	17	7	14	52

at Autzen Stadium • Eugene, OR

- Date: Friday November 27, 2015
- Game time: 1:00 p.m. PST

Game information

First quarter

- OSU – Seth Collins 3-yard run (Garrett Owens Kick)
- UO – Bralon Addison 13-yard run (Aidan Schneider Kick)
- UO – Taj Griffin 14-yard run (Schneider Kick)

Second quarter

- UO – Schneider 25-yard field goal
- UO – Royce Freeman 3-yard run (Schneider Kick)
- UO – Addison 37-yard pass from Vernon Adams (Schneider Kick)

Third quarter

- OSU – Collins 1-yard run (Owens Kick)
- OSU – Collins 9-yard run (Owens Kick)
- UO – Freeman 19-yard run (Schneider Kick)

Fourth quarter

- OSU – Marcus McMaryion 6-yard run (Owens Kick)
- OSU – Victor Bolden 78-yard punt return (Owens Kick)
- UO – Addison 4-yard pass from Adams (Schneider Kick)
- OSU – Ryan Nall 66-yard run (Owens Kick)
- UO – Addison 24-yard pass from Adams (Schneider Kick)

Passing

- OSU – Marcus McMaryion, 11/21, 154 yards, INT
- UO – Vernon Adams, 28/38, 366 yards, 3 TD

Rushing

- OSU – Ryan Nall, 19 carries, 174 yards, TD
- UO – Royce Freeman, 27 carries, 2 TD

Receiving

- OSU – J. Villamin, 4 receptions, 72 yards
- UO – Bralon Addison, 8 receptions, 106 yards, 3 TD

Defense

- OSU – Jonathan Willis, 13 tackles
- UO – DeForest Buckner, 7 tackles, 1 sack, 1 TFL

Kicking

- OSU – Garrett Owens, 6/6 XP
- UO – Aidan Schneider, 1/2 FG, 25 yard long, 7/7 XP

special teams

- OSU – Victor Bolden, 1 PR, 78 yards, TD, 5 KR, 108 yards
- UO – Charles Nelson, 4 KR, 99 yards

Oregon defeated their in-state rival, the Oregon State Beavers, 52–42 at Autzen Stadium to earn their eighth straight victory in the 119-year-old series. The Ducks extended their lead in the all-time series 63–46–10.

=== TCU—2016 Alamo Bowl ===
2016 Alamo Bowl – Game summary

Quarter	1	2	3	4	OT	2OT	3OT	Total
#15 Oregon	21	10	0	0	7	3	0	41
#11 TCU	0	0	17	14	7	3	6	47

at Alamodome • San Antonio, TX

- Date: January 2, 2016
- Game time: 3:56 p.m. PST
- MVP – Offensive: Bram Kohlhausen (TCU), Defensive: Travin Howard (TCU), Sportsmanship Award: Rodney Hardrick (ORE)
