= 2016 Oregon Ducks football team =

American college football season

2016 Oregon Ducks football
- Conference: Pac-12 Conference
- North Division
- Record: 4–8 (2–7 Pac-12)
- Head coach: Mark Helfrich (4th season)
- Offensive coordinator: Matt Lubick (1st season)
- Offensive scheme: No-huddle spread option
- Defensive coordinator: Brady Hoke (1st season)
- Base defense: 4–3
- Captain: Game captains
- Home stadium: Autzen Stadium

2016 Pac-12 Conference football standings
	Conf.			Overall
Team	W		L	W		L
North Division
No. 4 Washington xy$^	8	–	1	12	–	2
Washington State	7	–	2	8	–	5
No. 12 Stanford	6	–	3	10	–	3
California	3	–	6	5	–	7
Oregon State	3	–	6	4	–	8
Oregon	2	–	7	4	–	8
South Division
No. 17 Colorado xy	8	–	1	10	–	4
No. 3 USC	7	–	2	10	–	3
No. 23 Utah	5	–	4	9	–	4
Arizona State	2	–	7	5	–	7
UCLA	2	–	7	4	–	8
Arizona	1	–	8	3	–	9
Championship: Washington 41, Colorado 10
^ – College Football Playoff participant; $ – Conference champion; x – Division champion/co-champions; y – Championship game participant; Rankings from AP Poll

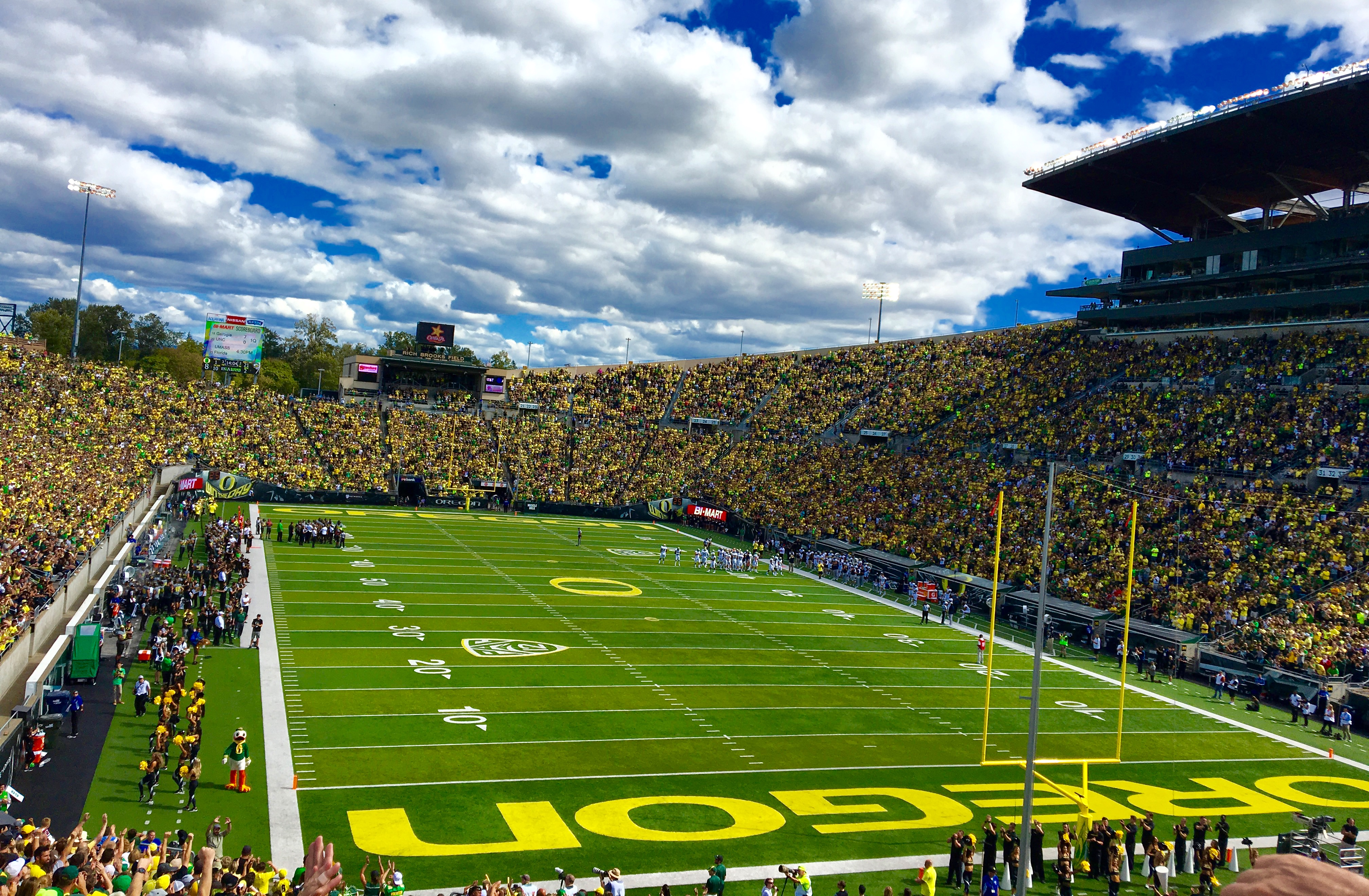
Opening game vs. UC Davis, September 3, 2016

The 2016 Oregon Ducks football team represented the University of Oregon in the 2016 NCAA Division I FBS football season. The team was led by fourth-year head coach Mark Helfrich and played their home games at Autzen Stadium for the 50th straight year. They were a member of the Pac-12 Conference in the North Division.

Two years removed from their appearance in the inaugural College Football Playoff National Championship, they finished the season 4–8, 2–7 in Pac-12 play to finish in last place in the North Division. On November 29, Helfrich and Oregon agreed to part ways. He finished at Oregon with a four year record of 37–16.

== Schedule ==
Date	Time	Opponent	Rank	Site	TV	Result	Attendance
September 3	2:00 pm	UC Davis*	No. 24	Autzen Stadium; Eugene, OR	P12N	W 53–28	53,817
September 10	7:30 pm	Virginia*	No. 24	Autzen Stadium; Eugene, OR	ESPN	W 44–26	53,774
September 17	12:30 pm	at Nebraska*	No. 22	Memorial Stadium; Lincoln, NE	ABC	L 32–35	91,414
September 24	2:30 pm	Colorado		Autzen Stadium; Eugene, OR	P12N	L 38–41	53,974
October 1	6:30 pm	at Washington State		Martin Stadium; Pullman, WA	P12N	L 33–51	33,528
October 8	4:30 pm	No. 5 Washington		Autzen Stadium; Eugene, OR (rivalry)	FOX	L 21–70	58,842
October 21	7:30 pm	at California		California Memorial Stadium; Berkeley, CA	ESPN	L 49–52 ^{2OT}	43,048
October 29	1:00 pm	Arizona State		Autzen Stadium; Eugene, OR	P12N	W 54–35	53,898
November 5	4:00 pm	at USC		Los Angeles Memorial Coliseum; Los Angeles, CA (rivalry)	ESPN	L 20–45	74,625
November 12	1:00 pm	Stanford		Autzen Stadium; Eugene, OR (rivalry)	P12N	L 27–52	53,757
November 19	2:00 pm	at No. 11 Utah		Rice–Eccles Stadium; Salt Lake City, UT	P12N	W 30–28	46,327
November 26	1:00 pm	at Oregon State		Reser Stadium; Corvallis, OR (Civil War)	P12N	L 24–34	44,160
*Non-conference game; Rankings from AP Poll released prior to the game; All times are in Pacific time

== Personnel ==
2016 Oregon Ducks football team roster
Players
Coaches
Offense

Pos.	#	Name	Class
WR	1	Dillon Mitchell	Fr
WR	2	Tristen Wallace	Fr
QB	3	Terry Wilson	Fr
WR	4	Alex Ofodile	Fr
RB	5	Taj Griffin	So
WR	7	Darren Carrington	Jr
QB	9	Dakota Prukop	Sr
QB	10	Justin Herbert	Fr
QB	11	Travis Jonsen	Fr
QB	12	Taylor Alie	Jr
WR	13	Devon Allen	Jr
WR	15	Jalen Brown	So
QB	17	Jeff Lockie	Sr
RB	20	Tony Brooks-James	So
RB	21	Royce Freeman	Jr
WR	22	Jeff Bieber	So
WR	26	Casey Eugenio	So
TE	27	Jake Breeland	Fr
WR	28	Chayce Maday	So
RB	29	Kani Benoit	Jr
WR	33	Kirk Merritt	So
RB	34	Lane Roseberry	Sr
RB	36	Langston Stuckey	Fr
RB	37	J.J. Jones	Sr
TE	39	Ryan Bay	Fr
TE	40	Taylor Stinson	So
RB	41	Jarret LaCoste	Sr
OL	54	Calvin Throckmorton	Fr
OL	55	Jake Hanson	Fr
OL	57	Doug Brenner	Jr
OL	63	Davis Miyashiro-Saipaia	So
OL	65	Mike Miller	Fr
OL	60	Logan Bathke	Fr
OL	66	Brady Aiello	Fr
OL	67	Tanner Davies	So
OL	68	Shane Lemieux	Fr
OL	71	Jacob Capra	Fr
OL	72	Samuel Poutasi	Fr
OL	73	Tyrell Crosby	Jr
OL	74	Elijah George	Jr
OL	75	Zach Okun	Fr
OL	76	Jake Pisarcik	Jr
OL	78	Cameron Hunt	Sr
OL	79	Evan Voeller	Jr
TE	81	Evan Baylis	Sr
TE	82	Jake McCreath	Sr
TE	83	Johnny Mundt	Sr
TE	84	Cameron McCormick	Fr
TE	85	Pharaoh Brown	Sr
WR	88	Dwayne Stanford	Sr

Defense

Pos.	#	Name	Class
DB	1	Arrion Springs	Jr
SS	2	Tyree Robinson	Jr
OLB	3	Jonah Moi	Jr
LB	4	Matt Mariota	Fr
FS	6	Charles Nelson	Jr
DB	8	Reggie Daniels	Sr
DL	9	Gus Cumberlander	Fr
DB	10	Ty Griffin	Jr
LB	11	Justin Hollins	So
CB	12	Chris Seisay	Jr
DB	13	Jhet Janis	Fr
CB	14	Ugo Amadi	So
SS	16	Dylan Kane	Fr
SS	17	Juwaan Williams	Jr
LB	18	Jimmie Swain	Jr
DB	19	Austin Daich	Sr
LB	20	Jake Froehlich	Fr
CB	22	Jihree Stewart	Fr
DB	23	Malik Lovette	Fr
LB	24	Keith Simms	Fr
DB	25	Brady Breeze	Fr
DB	26	Kahlil Oliver	So
DB	27	Mattrell McGraw	So
LB	28	Johnny Ragin III	Sr
DB	29	Tyler Reid	Fr
LB	30	Paris Bostick	Jr
DB	31	Sean Killpatrick	Fr
LB	32	Eddie Heard Jr.	Jr
LB	34	LaMar Winston Jr.	Fr
LB	35	Troy Dye	Fr
LB	36	Justin Hunter	Fr
LB	36	Eric Briscoe Jr.	Fr
DB	37	Michael Manns	Sr
LB	38	Jaren Zadlo	Fr
LB	39	Kaulana Apelu	So
LB	42	Cody Carriger	Sr
DB	43	Fotu Leiato	So
LB	44	Darrian Franklin	Fr
LB	46	Danny Mattingly	Jr
DL	47	Rex Manu	So
LB	48	Hunter Kampmoyer	Fr
DL	50	Austin Maloata	Jr
DL	51	Gary Baker	Fr
LB	52	Ivan Faulhaber	Jr
LB	53	Blake Rugraff	Fr
LB	54	De'Quan McDowell	Sr
LB	55	A.J. Hotchkins	Jr
DE	56	Bryson Young	Fr
DT	71	Wayne Kirby	Fr
LB	86	Torrodney Prevot	Sr
DL	90	Drayton Carlberg	Fr
DL	91	T.J. Daniel	Sr
DL	92	Henry Mondeaux	Jr
DL	93	Jason Sloan	Jr
DL	95	Spencer Stark	So
DL	97	Jalen Jelks	So
DL	98	Jordan Kurahara	So
DL	99	Canton Kaumatule	So

Special teams

Pos.	#	Name	Class
P	38	Ian Wheeler	Jr
PK	41	Aidan Schneider	Jr
P	42	Blake Maimone	Fr
PK	49	Matt Wogan	Sr
LS	58	Tanner Carew	Jr
LS	66	Devin Melendez	Jr

Head coach

- Mark Helfrich (3rd season)

Coordinators/assistant coaches

Offense

- Matt Lubick – Offensive coordinator & wide receivers (3rd season)*
- Gary Campbell – Running backs (33rd season)
- Steve Greatwood – Running game coordinator & offensive line (29th season)
- Tom osborne – Special teams coordinator & tight ends (15th season)
- David Yost – Passing game coordinator & quarterbacks (1st season)

Defense

- Brady Hoke – Defensive coordinator (1st season)
- Ron Aiken – Defensive line (3rd season)
- John Neal – Passing game coordinator & secondary (13th season)
- Don Pellum – Inside linebackers (23rd season)
- Jim Radcliffe – Strength and conditioning (31st season)

Legend

- (C) Team captain
- (S) Suspended
- (I) Ineligible
- Injured
- Redshirt

Roster

== Rankings ==
Ranking movements Legend: ██ Increase in ranking ██ Decrease in ranking — = Not ranked RV = Received votes
	Week															
Poll	Pre	1	2	3	4	5	6	7	8	9	10	11	12	13	14	Final
AP	24	24	22	RV	—	—	—	—	—	—	—	—	—	—	—	
Coaches	22	23	21	RV	RV	—	—	—	—	—	—	—	—	—	—	
CFP	Not released									—	—	—	—	—	—	Not released

== Game summaries ==
=== UC Davis ===
	1	2	3	4	Total
Aggies	7	0	14	7	28
No. 24 Ducks	8	17	14	14	53

=== Virginia ===
	1	2	3	4	Total
Cavaliers	6	0	14	6	26
No. 24 Ducks	13	17	14	0	44

=== At Nebraska ===
	1	2	3	4	Total
No. 22 Ducks	8	12	6	6	32
Cornhuskers	7	7	14	7	35

=== Colorado ===
	1	2	3	4	Total
Buffaloes	16	10	7	8	41
Ducks	7	10	21	0	38

=== At Washington State ===
	1	2	3	4	Total
Ducks	7	7	6	13	33
Cougars	7	21	2	21	51

=== Washington ===
	1	2	3	4	Total
No. 5 Huskies	21	14	21	14	70
Ducks	0	7	14	0	21

=== At California ===
	1	2	3	4	OT	2OT	Total
Ducks	0	14	14	14	7	0	49
Golden Bears	14	17	3	8	7	3	52

=== Arizona State ===
	1	2	3	4	Total
Sun Devils	14	0	8	13	35
Ducks	17	13	3	21	54

=== At USC ===
	1	2	3	4	Total
Ducks	6	0	7	7	20
Trojans	17	7	14	7	45

=== Stanford ===
	1	2	3	4	Total
Cardinal	21	17	14	0	52
Ducks	6	7	0	14	27

=== At Utah ===
	1	2	3	4	Total
Ducks	3	0	7	20	30
Utes	7	0	7	14	28

=== At Oregon State ===
Oregon Ducks (4–7) at Oregon State Beavers (3–8)

Quarter	1	2	3	4	Total
Oregon	7	7	10	0	24
Oregon St	7	7	7	13	34

at Reser Stadium, Corvallis, Oregon

- Date: November 26, 2016
- Game time: 1:00 p.m. PST
- Game weather: Cloudy, 50 °F (10 °C)
- Game attendance: 44,160
- Referee: Land Clark
- TV: Pac-12 Network
- Box Score

Game information

First quarter

- OSU – Ryan Nall 12-yard run (Garrett Owens kick), 9:19. Oregon St 7–0. Drive: 9 plays, 61 yards, 4:17.
- ORE – Tony Brooks-James 3-yard run (Aidan Schneider kick), 5:51. Tie 7–7. Drive: 10 plays, 75 yards, 3:28.

Second quarter

- ORE – Darren Carrington 33-yard pass from Jalen Brown (Aidan Schneider kick), 12:24. Oregon 14–7. Drive: 5 plays, 83 yards, 1:37.
- OSU – Ricky Ortiz 6-yard pass from Marcus McMaryion (Garrett Owens kick), 5:51. Tie 14–14. Drive: 10 plays, 75 yards, 6:33.

Third quarter

- ORE – Charles Nelson 23-yard pass from Justin Herbert (Aidan Schneider kick), 11:43. Oregon 21–14. Drive: 4 plays, 60 yards, 1:03.
- ORE – Aidan Schneider 46-yard field goal, 7:44. Oregon 24–14. Drive: 11 plays, 50 yards, 2:24.
- OSU – Ryan Nall 14-yard run (Garrett Owens kick), 3:46. Oregon 24–21. Drive: 7 plays, 75 yards, 3:58.

Fourth quarter

- OSU – Ryan Nall 6-yard run (Garrett Owens kick), 9:40. Oregon St 28–24. Drive; 11 plays, 80 yards, 6:32.
- OSU – Ryan Nall 2-yard run (kick failed), 1:56. Oregon St 34–24. Drive: 9 plays, 68 yards, 5:17.

Top passers

- ORE – Justin Herbert – 16/28, 180 yards, TD
- OSU – Marcus McMaryion – 13/20, 101 yards, TD

Top rushers

- ORE – Royce Freeman – 19 rushes, 106 yards
- OSU – Ryan Nall – 31 rushes, 155 yards, 4 TD

Top receivers

- ORE – Darren Carrington – 3 receptions, 76 yards, TD
- OSU – Ryan Nall - 2 receptions, 34 yards
