= 2017 Oregon Ducks football team =

American college football season

2017 Oregon Ducks football

Las Vegas Bowl, L 28–38 vs. Boise State
- Conference: Pac-12 Conference
- North Division
- Record: 7–6 (4–5 Pac-12)
- Head coach: Willie Taggart (1st season; regular season); Mario Cristobal (bowl game)
- Co-offensive coordinators: Mario Cristobal (1st season); Marcus Arroyo (1st season)
- Offensive scheme: West Coast
- Defensive coordinator: Jim Leavitt (1st season)
- Base defense: 3–4
- Captains: Royce Freeman; Henry Mondeaux
- Home stadium: Autzen Stadium

2017 Pac-12 Conference football standings
	Conf.			Overall
Team	W		L	W		L
North Division
No. 20 Stanford xy	7	–	2	9	–	5
No. 16 Washington x	7	–	2	10	–	3
Washington State	6	–	3	9	–	4
Oregon	4	–	5	7	–	6
California	2	–	7	5	–	7
Oregon State	0	–	9	1	–	11
South Division
No. 12 USC xy$	8	–	1	11	–	3
Arizona State	6	–	3	7	–	6
Arizona	5	–	4	7	–	6
UCLA	4	–	5	6	–	7
Utah	3	–	6	7	–	6
Colorado	2	–	7	5	–	7
Championship: USC 31, Stanford 28
$ – Conference champion; x – Division champion/co-champions; y – Championship game participant; Rankings from AP Poll

The 2017 Oregon Ducks football team represented the University of Oregon during the 2017 NCAA Division I FBS football season. The team was led by first-year head coach Willie Taggart, until he departed at the end of the regular season to accept the head coaching position at Florida State. Co-offensive coordinator Mario Cristobal was promoted to interim head coach before being officially hired as head coach on December 8, 2017. Oregon played their home games at Autzen Stadium for the 51st straight year. They competed as a member of the Pac-12 Conference in the North Division. They finished the season 7–6, 4–5 in Pac-12 play to finish in fourth place in the North Division. They were invited to the Las Vegas Bowl where they lost to Boise State.

== Recruiting ==
=== Position key ===
Back	B	Center	C	Cornerback	CB	Defensive back	DB
Defensive end	DE	Defensive lineman	DL	Defensive tackle	DT	End	E
Fullback	FB	Guard	G	Halfback	HB	Kicker	K
Kickoff returner	KR	Offensive tackle	OT	Offensive lineman	OL	Linebacker	LB
Long snapper	LS	Punter	P	Punt returner	PR	Quarterback	QB
Running back	RB	Safety	S	Tight end	TE	Wide receiver	WR

=== Recruits ===
Oregon signed a total of 24 recruits.

College recruiting
Name	Hometown	School	Height	Weight	Commit date
C. J. Verdell; RB	Chula Vista, California	Mater Dei HS	5 ft 9 in (1.75 m)	195 lb (88 kg)	May 5, 2016
C. J. Verdell; RB	Recruit ratings: Scout: Rivals: 247Sports: ESPN:				
Rutger Reitmaier; DT	Nashville, Tennessee	Lipscomb Academy	6 ft 3 in (1.91 m)	270 lb (120 kg)	Jun 8, 2016
Rutger Reitmaier; DT	Recruit ratings: Scout: Rivals: 247Sports: ESPN:				
Alex Forsyth; OT	West Linn, Oregon	West Linn HS	6 ft 5 in (1.96 m)	310 lb (140 kg)	Jun 11, 2016
Alex Forsyth; OT	Recruit ratings: Scout: Rivals: 247Sports: ESPN:				
Sampson Niu; LB	San Diego, California	Madison HS	6 ft 1 in (1.85 m)	217 lb (98 kg)	Jun 22, 2016
Sampson Niu; LB	Recruit ratings: Scout: Rivals: 247Sports: ESPN:				
Adam Stack; K	Honolulu, Hawaii	Kamehameha	6 ft 2 in (1.88 m)	175 lb (79 kg)	Jul 6, 2016
Adam Stack; K	Recruit ratings: Scout: Rivals: 247Sports: ESPN:				
Jaylon Redd; CB	Rancho Cucamonga, California	Rancho Cucamonga HS	5 ft 9 in (1.75 m)	180 lb (82 kg)	Jul 26, 2016
Jaylon Redd; CB	Recruit ratings: Scout: Rivals: 247Sports: ESPN:				
Nick Pickett; S/WR	Los Angeles, California	Salesian HS	6 ft 2 in (1.88 m)	185 lb (84 kg)	Oct 30, 2016
Nick Pickett; S/WR	Recruit ratings: Scout: Rivals: 247Sports: ESPN:				
Popo Aumavae; DT	Stockton, California	St. Mary's HS	6 ft 4 in (1.93 m)	315 lb (143 kg)	Nov 13, 2016
Popo Aumavae; DT	Recruit ratings: Scout: Rivals: 247Sports: ESPN:				
Johnny Johnson III; WR	Chandler, Arizona	Chandler HS	6 ft 0 in (1.83 m)	194 lb (88 kg)	Nov 13, 2016
Johnny Johnson III; WR	Recruit ratings: Scout: Rivals: 247Sports: ESPN:				
Darrian McNeal; WR	Seffner, Florida	Armwood HS	5 ft 9 in (1.75 m)	160 lb (73 kg)	Dec 11, 2016
Darrian McNeal; WR	Recruit ratings: Scout: Rivals: 247Sports: ESPN:				
Thomas Graham Jr. CB	Rancho Cucamonga, California	Rancho Cucamonga HS	5 ft 11 in (1.80 m)	175 lb (79 kg)	Dec 16, 2016
Thomas Graham Jr. CB	Recruit ratings: Scout: Rivals: 247Sports: ESPN:				
Jordon Scott; DT	Largo, Florida	Pinellas Park HS	6 ft 1 in (1.85 m)	345 lb (156 kg)	Dec 25, 2016
Jordon Scott; DT	Recruit ratings: Scout: Rivals: 247Sports: ESPN:				
Darrian Felix; RB/CB	Fort Myers, Florida	Fort Myers HS	5 ft 11 in (1.80 m)	194 lb (88 kg)	Jan 8, 2017
Darrian Felix; RB/CB	Recruit ratings: Scout: Rivals: 247Sports: ESPN:				
Braxton Burmeister; QB	La Jolla, California	La Jolla Country Day School	6 ft 1 in (1.85 m)	211 lb (96 kg)	Jan 13, 2017
Braxton Burmeister; QB	Recruit ratings: Scout: Rivals: 247Sports: ESPN:				
Isaac Slade-Matautia; LB	Honolulu, Hawaii	Saint Louis School	6 ft 1 in (1.85 m)	206 lb (93 kg)	Jan 21, 2017
Isaac Slade-Matautia; LB	Recruit ratings: Scout: Rivals: 247Sports: ESPN:				
Austin Faoliu; DT	Santa Ana, California	Mater Dei HS	6 ft 3 in (1.91 m)	285 lb (129 kg)	Jan 21, 2017
Austin Faoliu; DT	Recruit ratings: Scout: Rivals: 247Sports: ESPN:				
Cyrus Habibi-Likio; RB	Mountain View, California	St. Francis HS	6 ft 1 in (1.85 m)	200 lb (91 kg)	Jan 26, 2017
Cyrus Habibi-Likio; RB	Recruit ratings: Scout: Rivals: 247Sports: ESPN:				
Bruce Judson; QB	Cocoa, Florida	Cocoa HS	5 ft 9 in (1.75 m)	202 lb (92 kg)	Jan 27, 2017
Bruce Judson; QB	Recruit ratings: Scout: Rivals: 247Sports: ESPN:				
Demetri Burch; WR	Apopka, Florida	Apopka HS	5 ft 11 in (1.80 m)	182 lb (83 kg)	Jan 28, 2017
Demetri Burch; WR	Recruit ratings: Scout: Rivals: 247Sports: ESPN:				
Daewood Davis; WR	Deerfield Beach, Florida	Deerfield Beach HS	6 ft 2 in (1.88 m)	175 lb (79 kg)	Jan 29, 2017
Daewood Davis; WR	Recruit ratings: Scout: Rivals: 247Sports: ESPN:				
George Moore; OT	Antioch, California	College of San Mateo	6 ft 7 in (2.01 m)	308 lb (140 kg)	Jan 31, 2017
George Moore; OT	Recruit ratings: Scout: Rivals: 247Sports: ESPN:				
Cody Shear; OG	Eugene, Oregon	Sheldon HS	6 ft 4 in (1.93 m)	285 lb (129 kg)	Feb 1, 2017
Cody Shear; OG	Recruit ratings: Scout: Rivals: 247Sports: ESPN:				
Billy Gibson; S	Miami, Florida	Southridge HS	6 ft 1 in (1.85 m)	185 lb (84 kg)	Feb 1, 2017
Billy Gibson; S	Recruit ratings: Scout: Rivals: 247Sports: ESPN:				
Deommodore Lenoir; CB	Los Angeles, California	Salesian HS	6 ft 0 in (1.83 m)	175 lb (79 kg)	Feb 1, 2017
Deommodore Lenoir; CB	Recruit ratings: Scout: Rivals: 247Sports: ESPN:				
Overall recruit ranking:
Note: In many cases, Scout, Rivals, 247Sports, On3, and ESPN may conflict in their listings of height and weight.; In these cases, the average was taken. ESPN grades are on a 100-point scale.; Sources: "Oregon Football Commitments". Rivals.; "2017 Oregon Football Commits". Scout.; "ESPN". ESPN.; "Scout.com Team Recruiting Rankings". Scout.; "2017 Team Ranking". Rivals.com.

== Schedule ==
Date	Time	Opponent	Rank	Site	TV	Result	Attendance
September 2	5:15 p.m.	Southern Utah*		Autzen Stadium; Eugene, OR	P12N	W 77–21	52,204
September 9	1:30 p.m.	Nebraska*		Autzen Stadium; Eugene, OR	FOX	W 42–35	58,389
September 16	4:00 p.m.	at Wyoming*		War Memorial Stadium; Laramie, WY	CBSSN	W 49–13	29,139
September 23	7:00 p.m.	at Arizona State	No. 24	Sun Devil Stadium; Tempe, AZ	P12N	L 35–37	50,110
September 30	7:30 p.m.	California		Autzen Stadium; Eugene, OR	FS1	W 45–24	55,707
October 7	5:00 p.m.	No. 11 Washington State		Autzen Stadium; Eugene, OR	FOX	L 10–33	56,653
October 14	8:00 p.m.	at No. 23 Stanford		Stanford Stadium; Stanford, CA (rivalry)	FS1	L 7–49	48,559
October 21	1:00 p.m.	at UCLA		Rose Bowl; Pasadena, CA	P12N	L 14–31	55,711
October 28	2:45 p.m.	Utah^{†}		Autzen Stadium; Eugene, OR	P12N	W 41–20	56,154
November 4	7:00 p.m.	at No. 12 Washington		Husky Stadium; Seattle, WA (rivalry)	FS1	L 3–38	70,572
November 18	4:00 p.m.	Arizona		Autzen Stadium; Eugene, OR	P12N	W 48–28	51,799
November 25	4:00 p.m.	Oregon State		Autzen Stadium; Eugene, OR (Civil War)	ESPN2	W 69–10	57,475
December 16	12:30 p.m.	vs. No. 25 Boise State*		Sam Boyd Stadium; Whitney, NV (Las Vegas Bowl)	ABC	L 28–38	36,432
*Non-conference game; ^{†}Homecoming; Rankings from AP Poll released prior to the game; All times are in Pacific time

== Personnel ==
=== Roster ===
2017 Oregon Ducks football team roster
Players
Coaches
Offense

Pos.	#	Name	Class
RB	5	Taj Griffin	Jr
WR	6	Charles Nelson	Sr
QB	10	Justin Herbert	So
QB	11	Braxton Burmeister	Fr
QB	12	Taylor Alie	Sr
WR	13	Dillon Mitchell	So
ATH	14	Demetri Burch	Fr
QB	17	Mike Irwin	Fr
RB	20	Tony Brooks-James	Jr
RB	21	Royce Freeman	Sr
RB	22	Darrian Felix	Fr
WR	23	Malik Lovette	So
RB	25	C. J. Verdell	Fr
WR	26	Kyle Buckner	So
TE	27	Jake Breeland	So
WR	28	Chayce Maday	Jr
RB	29	Kani Benoit	Sr
WR	30	Jaylon Redd	Fr
RB	33	Cyrus Habibi-Likio	Fr
TE	37	Ivan Faulhaber	Sr
TE	40	Taylor Stinson	Jr
TE	44	Matt Mariota	So
OL	52	Cody Shear	Fr
OL	54	Calvin Throckmorton	So
OL	55	Jake Hanson	So
OL	57	Doug Brenner	Sr
OL	60	Logan Bathke	Fr
OL	64	Charlie Landgraf	So
OL	66	Brady Aiello	So
OL	68	Shane Lemieux	So
OL	71	Jacob Capra	Fr
OL	72	Samuel Poutasi	Fr
OL	73	Tyrell Crosby	Sr
OL	76	Jake Pisarcik	Sr
OL	77	George Moore	So
OL	78	Alex Forsyth	Fr
OL	79	Evan Voeller	Sr
WR	80	Johnny Johnson III	Fr
WR	81	Daewood Davis	Fr
WR	82	Casey Eugenio	Jr
WR	83	Alex Ofodile	So
TE	84	Cameron McCormick	Fr
WR	85	Alfonso Cobb	Fr
WR	86	Brenden Schooler	So
TE	87	Ryan Bay	So
TE	88	Drake Brennan	So
WR	89	Darrian McNeal	Fr
QB	-	Bruce Judson	Fr

Defense

Pos.	#	Name	Class
DB	1	Arrion Springs	Sr
DB	2	Tyree Robinson	Sr
OLB	3	Jonah Moi	Sr
CB	4	Thomas Graham Jr.	Fr
DL	5	Scott Pagano	Sr
CB	7	Ugo Amadi	Jr
CB	10	Ty Griffin	Sr
LB	11	Justin Hollins	Jr
LB	12	Sampson Niu	Fr
CB	15	Deommodore Lenoir	Fr
S	16	Nick Pickett	Fr
S	17	Juwaan Williams	Sr
LB	18	Jimmie Swain	Sr
LB	19	Fotu Leiato II	Jr
S	21	Mattrell McGraw	Jr
CB	22	Jihree Stewart	So
LB	24	Keith Simms	So
S	25	Brady Breeze	Fr
S	26	Kahlil Oliver	Jr
S	28	Billy Gibson	Fr
S	29	Pou Peleti-Gore	Jr
CB	31	Sean Killpatrick	So
LB	32	La'Mar Winston Jr.	So
DL	34	Jordon Scott	Fr
LB	35	Troy Dye	So
CB	37	Dexter Myers	Fr
LB	39	Kaulana Apelu	Jr
LB	43	Isaac Slade-Matautia	Fr
DL	45	Gus Cumberlander	So
DL	48	Hunter Kampmoyer	Fr
DL	50	Popo Aumavae	Fr
DL	51	Gary Baker	So
LB	53	Blake Rugraff	So
LB	55	A.J. Hotchkins	Sr
DE	56	Bryson Young	So
DL	90	Drayton Carlberg	So
DL	91	Elijah George	Sr
DL	92	Henry Mondeaux	Sr
DL	94	Malik Young	Sr
DL	97	Jalen Jelks	Jr
DL	98	Jordan Kurahara	Jr
DT	99	Austin Faoliu	Fr

Special teams

Pos.	#	Name	Class
K	38	Alec Hallman	Fr
PK	40	Zach Emerson	Fr
K	41	Aidan Schneider	Sr
P	42	Blake Maimone	So
LS	58	Tanner Carew	Sr
LS	66	Devin Melendez	Sr
K	96	Adam Stack	Fr

Head coach

- Willie Taggart

Coordinators/assistant coaches

Offense

- Marcus Arroyo – Co-offensive coordinator / quarterbacks & tight ends
- Mario Cristobal – Co-offensive coordinator / run game coordinator / offensive line
- Michael Johnson – Wide receivers
- Donte Pimpleton – Running backs
- Irele Oderinde – Strength and conditioning

Defense

- Charles Clark - Cornerbacks
- Keith Heyward – Safeties
- Jim Leavitt – Defensive coordinator / inside linebackers
- Joe Salave'a – Associate head coach / defensive line
- Raymond Woodie – Special teams coordinator / outside linebackers

Legend

- (C) Team captain
- (S) Suspended
- (I) Ineligible
- Injured
- Redshirt

Roster

=== Coaching staff ===
Name	Position	Years at current position at Oregon	Alma mater
Willie Taggart	Head coach	0	Western Kentucky (1998)
Mario Cristobal	Head coach (Bowl Game), Co-offensive coordinator, Offensive line coach	0	Miami (1992)
Marcus Arroyo	Co-offensive coordinator, Quarterbacks coach	0	San Jose State (2002)
Jim Leavitt	Defensive coordinator, Linebackers coach	0	Missouri (1977)
Donte Pimpleton	Running backs coach	0	Western Kentucky (2002)
Charles Clark	Cornerbacks coach	0	Ole Miss (2007)
Keith Heyward	Safeties Coach	0	Oregon State (2000)
Joe Salave'a	Defensive line coach	0	Arizona (1997)
Raymond Woodie	Special teams coordinator	0	Bethune-Cookman (1995)
Irele Oderinde	Head Strength Coach	0	Western Kentucky (2003)

== Rankings ==
Ranking movements Legend: ██ Increase in ranking ██ Decrease in ranking — = Not ranked RV = Received votes
	Week															
Poll	Pre	1	2	3	4	5	6	7	8	9	10	11	12	13	14	Final
AP	RV	RV	RV	24	RV	RV	—	—	—	—	—	—	—	—	—	—
Coaches	RV	RV	RV	24	RV	RV	—	—	—	—	—	—	—	—	—	—
CFP	Not released									—	—	—	—	—	—	Not released

== Game summaries ==
=== Southern Utah ===
Team	1	2	3	4	Total
Southern Utah	7	14	0	0	21
• Oregon	21	21	21	14	77

- Date: September 2
- Location: Autzen Stadium

=== Nebraska ===
Team	1	2	3	4	Total
Nebraska	7	7	14	7	35
• Oregon	21	21	0	0	42

- Date: September 9
- Location: Autzen Stadium

=== Wyoming ===
Team	1	2	3	4	Total
• Oregon	14	28	0	7	49
Wyoming	10	0	3	0	13

- Date: September 16
- Location: War Memorial Stadium

=== Arizona State ===
Team	1	2	3	4	Total
Oregon	7	7	14	7	35
• Arizona St	17	0	14	6	37

- Date: September 23
- Location: Sun Devil Stadium

=== California ===
Team	1	2	3	4	Total
California	0	7	7	10	24
• Oregon	17	0	7	21	45

- Date: September 30
- Location: Autzen Stadium

=== Washington State ===
Team	1	2	3	4	Total
• Washington St	7	6	10	10	33
Oregon	10	0	0	10	20

- Date: October 7
- Location: Autzen Stadium

=== Stanford ===
Team	1	2	3	4	Total
Oregon	7	0	0	0	7
• Stanford	21	7	7	14	49

- Date: October 14
- Location: Stanford Stadium

=== UCLA ===
Team	1	2	3	4	Total
Oregon	0	14	0	0	14
• UCLA	14	0	10	7	31

- Date: October 21
- Location: Rose Bowl

=== Utah ===
Team	1	2	3	4	Total
Utah	0	6	7	7	20
• Oregon	7	10	10	14	41

- Date: October 28
- Location: Autzen Stadium

=== Washington ===
Team	1	2	3	4	Total
Oregon	3	0	0	0	3
• Washington	0	17	21	0	38

- Date: November 4
- Location: Husky Stadium

=== Arizona ===
Team	1	2	3	4	Total
Arizona	7	14	7	0	28
• Oregon	14	14	7	13	48

- Date: November 18
- Location: Autzen Stadium

=== Oregon State ===
Team	1	2	3	4	Total
Oregon St	7	0	3	0	10
• Oregon	17	35	10	7	69

- Date: November 25
- Location: Autzen Stadium

Scoring summary
Q1	11:26	ORE	Schneider 31 yard field goal	ORE 3–0
Q1	6:50	ORE	Freeman 2 yard run (Schneider kick)	ORE 10–0
Q1	3:28	ORE	Mitchell 29 yard pass from Herbert (Schneider kick)	ORE 17–0
Q1	0:51	ORST	Hernandez 43 yard pass from Garretson (Choukair kick)	ORE 17–7
Q2	14:56	ORE	Breeland 12 yard pass from Herbert (Schneider kick)	ORE 24–7
Q2	10:49	ORE	Freeman 13 yard run (Schneider kick)	ORE 31–7
Q2	8:49	ORE	Redd 19 yard run (Schneider kick)	ORE 38–7
Q2	7:43	ORE	Herbert 6 yard run (Schneider kick)	ORE 45–7
Q2	2:13	ORE	Mitchell 53 yard pass from Herbert (Schneider kick)	ORE 52–7
Q3	7:21	ORE	Schneider 25 yard field goal	ORE 55–7
Q3	6:22	ORE	Hollins 11 yard interception return (Schneider kick)	ORE 62–7
Q3	3:31	ORST	Choukair 24 yard field goal	ORE 62—10
Q4	11:24	ORE	Benoit 47 yard run (Schneider kick)	ORE 69–10

=== Las Vegas Bowl ===
Team	1	2	3	4	Total
Oregon	0	14	0	14	28
• Boise St	14	10	7	7	38

- Date: December 16
- Location: Sam Boyd Stadium
