= Devon Allen =

American football player and hurdler (born 1994)

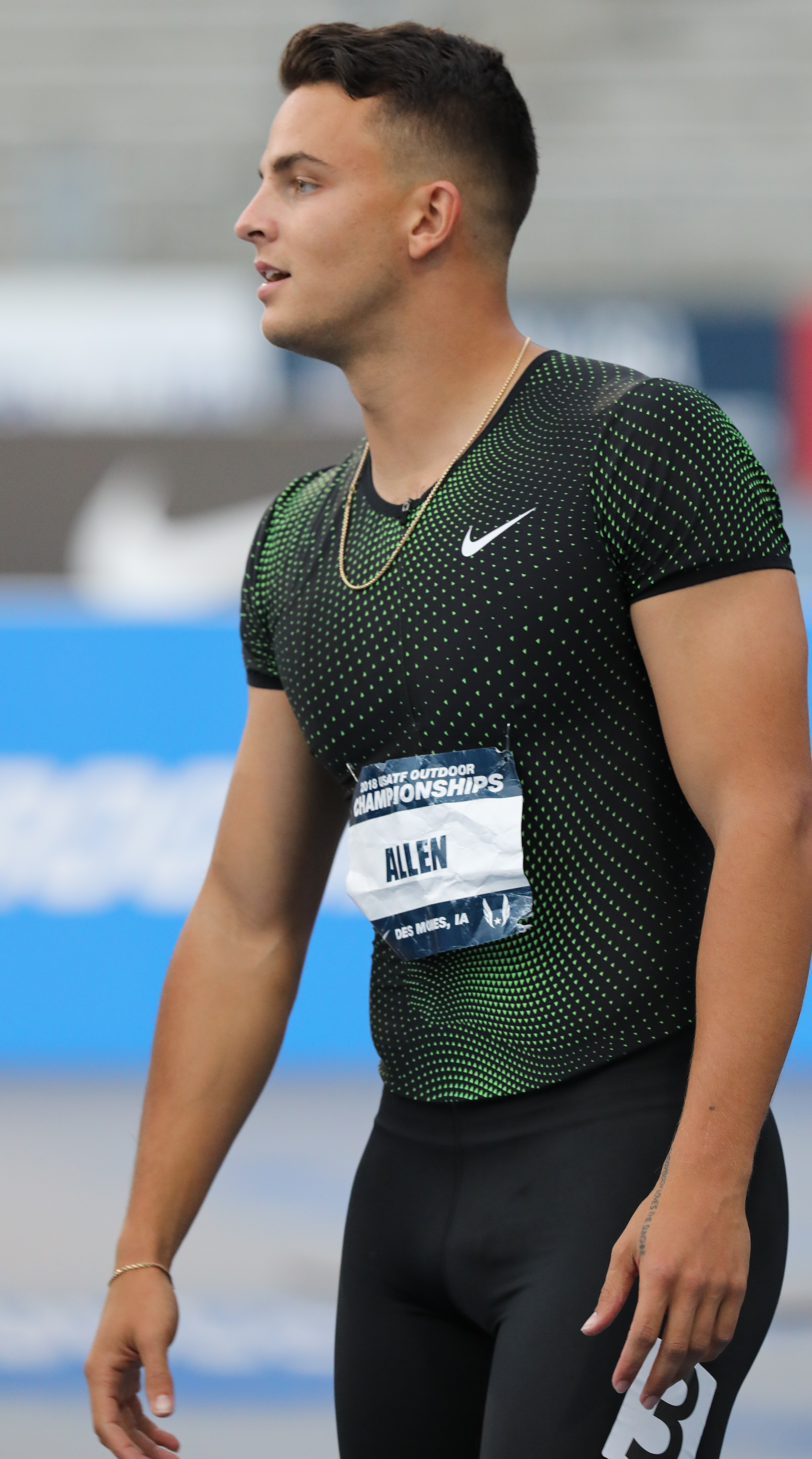
- Devon Allen in 2018

Profile
- Position: Wide receiver

Personal information
- Born: December 12, 1994 (age 31); Phoenix, Arizona, U.S.
- Listed height: 6 ft 1 in (1.85 m)
- Listed weight: 190 lb (86 kg)

Career information
- High school: Brophy College Preparatory (Phoenix, Arizona)
- College: Oregon (2013–2016)
- NFL draft: 2017: undrafted

Career history
- Philadelphia Eagles (2022–2023)

Career NFL statistics
- Return yards: 17
- Stats at Pro Football Reference

Devon Allen (born December 12, 1994) is an American track and field athlete and two-time Olympian, specializing in the 110-meter hurdles, and a professional football wide receiver. He played wide receiver for the University of Oregon football team from 2014 to 2016.

== Early life ==
Devon Allen was born in 1994 in Phoenix, Arizona, to Louis Allen and Joey Knudson. His father is African American while his mother is White. Louis Allen died in June 2022.

At an early age, Allen competed in athletics with the Arizona Rising Suns track club. Despite having a strong interest in football, his coaches insisted he pursued athletics at Brophy College Preparatory.

=== Football recruiting ===
College recruiting
Name	Hometown	School	Height	Weight	40^{‡}	Commit date
Devon Allen; WR	Phoenix, AZ	Brophy Prep	5 ft 11 in (1.80 m)	190 lb (86 kg)	4.5	Jan 25, 2013
Devon Allen; WR	Recruit ratings: Scout: Rivals: 247Sports: (74)					
Overall recruit ranking: Scout: 114 (WR) Rivals: 186 (WR) ESPN: 166 (WR)
Note: In many cases, Scout, Rivals, 247Sports, On3, and ESPN may conflict in their listings of height and weight.; In these cases, the average was taken. ESPN grades are on a 100-point scale.; Sources: "Oregon Football Commitments". Rivals.; "2011 Oregon Football Commits". Scout.; "ESPN". ESPN.; "Scout.com Team Recruiting Rankings". Scout.; "2013 Team Ranking". Rivals.com.

== Football career ==
=== 2014–2016: College football ===
Graduating high school as a four-star recruit, Allen committed to the University of Oregon and played on their football team for three years as a wide receiver. He tore his ACL in the 2015 Rose Bowl, and again in September 2016. After graduating college, Allen decided to focus on athletics instead of football.

==== College football statistics ====
Season	Receiving					Rushing				
Season	Rec	Yds	Avg	Lng	TD	Att	Yds	Avg	Lng	TD
2014	41	684	16.7	80	7	1	21	21.0	21	0
2015	9	94	10.4	23	0	0	0	0.0	0	0
2016	4	143	35.3	77	1	3	13	4.3	6	0
Career	54	921	17.1	80	8	4	34	8.5	21	0

=== 2022–2023: Philadelphia Eagles ===
After years of primarily competing in track & field, Allen participated in the football pro day at the University of Oregon during the 2022 preseason. He ran an unofficial time of 4.35 seconds in the 40-yard dash. On April 7, 2022, he visited the Philadelphia Eagles' NovaCare Complex training facility. The following day, he signed a standard three-year undrafted rookie deal with the Eagles. He was waived on August 30, and re-signed to the practice squad the next day. On February 15, 2023, Allen signed a reserve/future contract with the Eagles.

On August 29, 2023, Allen was waived by the Eagles and re-signed to the practice squad. On September 25, Allen was promoted from the practice squad to make his NFL debut in Philadelphia's Week 3 contest against the Tampa Bay Buccaneers. He tore his ACL for a third time in December.

Allen was not signed to a reserve/future contract after the 2023-24 season and thus became a free agent when his practice squad contract expired.

== Track and field career ==
In the 110-meter hurdles, Allen is a three-time U.S. national champion (2014, 2016, and 2018) and a two-time Olympian, reaching the finals in both the 2016 Rio de Janeiro Olympics and the 2020 Tokyo Olympics. His personal best of 12.84 seconds, set in 2022, ranks as the third-fastest time in history. In his final meet of 2021, Allen clocked 12.99 seconds and became the 13th American hurdler to ever break the 13-second barrier in this event.

On July 17, 2022, Allen was disqualified at the 2022 World Athletics Championships in Eugene, Oregon, due to a controversial false start. The sensors in the starting blocks measured his reaction time from the moment the gun went off at 0.099 seconds, which is 0.001 seconds faster than the legally allowed reaction time of 0.100 seconds.

In January 2024, Allen announced his hopes to qualify for the 2024 Paris Olympics. He was unable to achieve this goal, however, due to a persistent ACL injury. In October 2024, it was announced that he had signed up for the inaugural season of the Michael Johnson founded Grand Slam Track.

== Track and field achievements ==
Year	Competition	Venue	Position	Event	Notes
Representing the University of Oregon
2014	2014 Pac-12 Conference Outdoor Track and Field Championships	Pullman, Washington	2nd	110 meters hurdles	13.47
2014	2014 Pac-12 Conference Outdoor Track and Field Championships	Pullman, Washington	2nd	400 meters hurdles	51.19
2014	2014 NCAA Division I Outdoor Track and Field Championships	Eugene, Oregon	1st	110 meters hurdles	13.16
2014	2014 USA Outdoor Track and Field Championships	Sacramento, California	1st	110 meters hurdles	13.16
2016	2016 NCAA Division I Outdoor Track and Field Championships	Eugene, Oregon	1st	110 meters hurdles	13.50
2016	US Olympic Trials	Eugene, Oregon	1st	110 meters hurdles	13.03
Representing Nike
2017	USA Outdoor Track and Field Championships	Sacramento, California	3rd	110 meters hurdles	13.34
2018	USA Indoor Track and Field Championships	Albuquerque, New Mexico	3rd	60 meters hurdles	7.49
2018	USA Outdoor Track and Field Championships	Des Moines, Iowa	1st	110 meters hurdles	13.46
2019	USA Indoor Track and Field Championships	Staten Island, New York	1st	60 meters hurdles	7.60
2019	USA Outdoor Track and Field Championships	Des Moines, Iowa	3rd	110 meters hurdles	13.38
2021	US Olympic Trials	Eugene, Oregon	2nd	110 meters hurdles	13.10
Representing the United States
2016	Olympic Games	Rio de Janeiro, Brazil	5th	110 meters hurdles	13.31
2017	World Championships	London, United Kingdom	9th (sf)	110 meters hurdles	13.27
2019	World Championships	Doha, Qatar	7th	110 meters hurdles	13.70
2021	Olympic Games	Tokyo, Japan	4th	110 meters hurdles	13.14
2022	World Championships	Eugene, United States	4th (sf)	110 meters hurdles	13.09^{1}

^{1} Disqualified in the final.
