= Tyree Robinson =

American football player (born 1994)

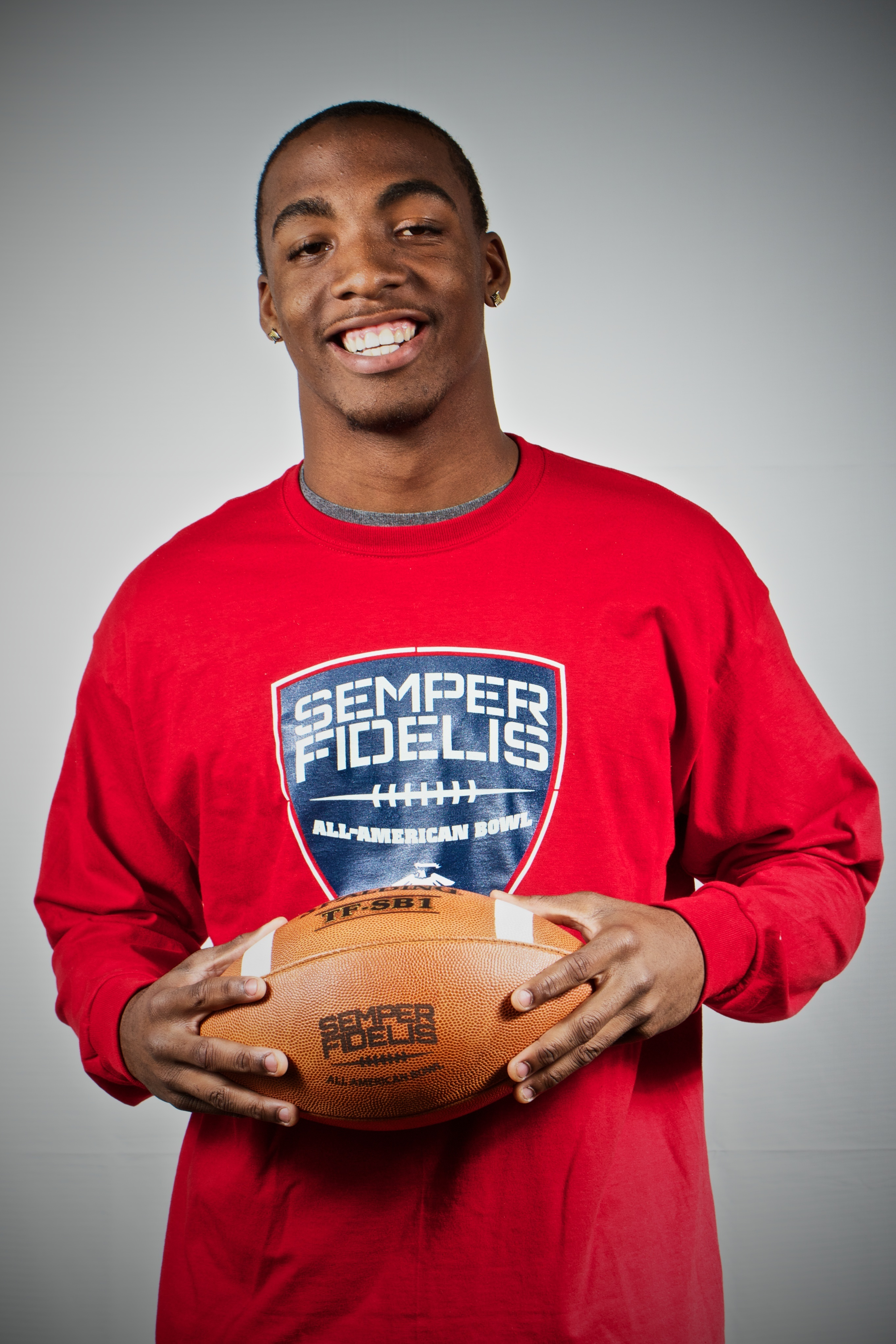
- Robinson in 2012

No. 23, 9
- Position: Safety

Personal information
- Born: April 14, 1994 (age 32); San Diego, California, U.S.
- Listed height: 6 ft 2 in (1.88 m)
- Listed weight: 215 lb (98 kg)

Career information
- High school: Lincoln (San Diego, California)
- College: Oregon
- NFL draft: 2018: undrafted

Career history
- Dallas Cowboys (2018)*; San Francisco 49ers (2018); Hamilton Tiger-Cats (2020–2021)*; Saskatchewan Roughriders (2022)*; Edmonton Elks (2022)*; Birmingham Stallions (2022–2023)
- * Offseason or practice squad member only

Awards and highlights
- 2× USFL champion (2022, 2023)
- Stats at Pro Football Reference

Tyree Robinson (born April 14, 1994) is an American former football safety. He played college football at the University of Oregon.

== Early life ==
Robinson attended Lincoln High School. As a junior, he had 12 receptions for 160 yards, one touchdown, 9 tackles and was named to the San Diego All-section second-team on offense. As a shooting guard in basketball, he averaged 21.3 points and 5.8 rebounds per game, while being selected to the Cal-Hi Sports All-State Grid-Hoop Team.

As a senior, he posted 60 tackles, 4 interceptions, 10 passes defensed, 17 receptions for 319 yards (18.8 avg.) and 10 touchdowns. He was selected to the Cal-Hi All-state team as a multi-purpose player (QB/WR/DB) and named San Diego sectional offensive player-of-the-year, along with receiving All-league first-team offensive honors.

== College career ==
Robinson accepted a football scholarship from the University of Oregon. He was a backup at strong safety as a freshman. His only start came against the University of Utah. He had 36 tackles (12th on the team), one tackle for loss and one pass defensed.

As a sophomore, he was moved from safety to cornerback for the last 6 games of the season. He started 11 games, tallying 64 tackles (fourth on the team), 1.5 tackles for loss, 3 interceptions (led the team), 5 passes defensed and one sack. He had 2 interceptions against Georgia State University, including one returned for a 41-yard touchdown.

As a junior, he started the first 2 games at safety, before being moved back to cornerback. He started 11 games, making 53 tackles (fourth on the team), one interception, 6 passes defensed (second on the team) and one sack.

As a senior, he started 12 games at safety, collecting 48 tackles (seventh on the team), 2 tackles for loss, 2 interceptions (third on the team), 5 passes defensed and 2 fumble recoveries. He returned an interception 100 yards for a touchdown, in the 2017 Las Vegas Bowl 28–38 loss against Boise State University.

=== College statistics ===
			Defense				
Year	Team	GP	Tackles	For Loss	Sacks	Int	PD
2014	Oregon	15	36	1.0	0.0	0	1
2015	Oregon	13	64	1.5	1.0	3	5
2016	Oregon	12	53	1.0	1.0	1	6
2017	Oregon	12	48	2.0	0.0	2	5
Total		52	201	5.5	2.0	6	17

== Professional career ==
Pre-draft measurables
Height	Weight	Arm length	Hand span	40-yard dash	10-yard split	20-yard split	20-yard shuttle	Three-cone drill	Vertical jump	Broad jump	Bench press
6 ft 2 1/4 in (1.89 m)	202 lb (92 kg)	31 1/2 in (0.80 m)	8 3/4 in (0.22 m)	4.54 s	1.62 s	2.67 s	4.34 s	7.10 s	37.5 in (0.95 m)	10 ft 10 in (3.30 m)	10 reps
All values from Pro Day

=== Dallas Cowboys ===
Robinson was signed as an undrafted free agent by the Dallas Cowboys after the 2018 NFL draft on April 30. After making the Cowboys regular season roster, Robinson was waived on September 18, after free safety Xavier Woods recovered from his hamstring injury. He was re-signed to the practice squad on September 20.

=== San Francisco 49ers ===
On December 11, 2018, Robinson was signed to the San Francisco 49ers' active roster off Dallas' practice squad.

On August 10, 2019, Robinson was waived by the 49ers. He was re-signed 11 days later on August 21. He was released on August 31.

=== Hamilton Tiger-Cats ===
On April 20, 2020, Robinson signed with the Hamilton Tiger-Cats of the Canadian Football League (CFL). After the CFL canceled the 2020 season due to the COVID-19 pandemic, Robinson chose to opt-out of his contract with the Tiger-Cats on September 3, 2020. He re-signed with the team on October 19, 2020. He was released on July 23, 2021.

=== Saskatchewan Roughriders ===
On October 29, 2021, he signed with the Saskatchewan Roughriders of the CFL. He was moved to the team's suspended list while he completed his COVID-19 quarantine. On November 2, 2021, he was signed to the practice squad. On December 6, 2021, he was released from the practice squad.

=== Edmonton Elks ===
On January 31, 2022, Robinson was signed by the Edmonton Elks of the CFL. He was released on February 2, 2022.

=== Birmingham Stallions ===
Robinson was selected by the Birmingham Stallions in the 19th round (149th overall) of the 2022 USFL draft. He had 37 tackles and one interception.

In 2023, he appeared in 10 games with 9 starts at safety, registering 45 tackles (one for loss), one interception, and 7 pass deflections.

He became a free agent after the 2023 season.
