= Jeff Lockie =

American football player (born 1993)

Profile
- Position: Quarterback

Personal information
- Born: November 14, 1993 (age 32)
- Listed height: 6 ft 2 in (1.88 m)
- Listed weight: 205 lb (93 kg)

Career information
- High school: Monte Vista (Danville, California)
- College: Oregon (2012–2016)

Jeff Lockie (born November 14, 1993) is an American former college football quarterback who played for the Oregon Ducks of the University of Oregon.

== Early life ==
Lockie played high school football at Monte Vista High School in Danville, California, where he was a two-year starter. He threw for 2,449 passing yards and 26 touchdowns while also rushing for 205 yards his junior year. He completed 234 passes for 3,278 passing yards and 31 touchdowns while also rushing for 136 yards and 7 touchdowns his senior season in 2011, earning East Bay Athletic League MVP honors.

== College career ==
Lockie lettered for the Oregon Ducks of the University of Oregon from 2013 to 2016. He was redshirted in 2012. Lockie and Jake Rodrigues shared the backup spot behind Marcus Mariota in 2013. Lockie played in 9 games in 2013, completing 8 of 13 passes for 57 yards and 1 interception while also rushing 5 times for 22 yards and 1 touchdown. He earned Pac-12 All-Academic Honorable Mention honors in 2013. He was the backup to Mariota in 2014. Lockie played in 10 games, completing 21 of 28 passes for 207 yards and 1 touchdown while also rushing 4 times for 10 yards. He was the backup to Vernon Adams in 2015. Lockie played in 6 games, starting 3, completing 61 of 99 passes for 580 yards, 5 touchdowns and 4 interceptions while also rushing 34 times for 92 yards. His three starts were a result of Adams being injured. Lockie garnered CoSIDA Academic All-District and Pac-12 All-Academic First Team recognition in 2015. He did not play in any games in 2016 and was named Oregon's Offensive Scout Team Player of the Year. He played in 25 games, starting 3, during his college career, completing 90 of 140 passes for 844 yards, 6 touchdowns and 5 interceptions while also rushing 43 times for 124 yards and 1 touchdown.

== Career statistics ==
=== College ===
Season	Team	Games			Passing								Rushing			
Season	Team	GP	GS	Record	Cmp	Att	Pct	Yds	Y/A	TD	Int	Rtg	Att	Yds	Avg	TD
2012	Oregon	0	0	—	Redshirted (redshirt)											
2013	Oregon	8	0	—	8	13	61.5	57	4.4	0	1	83.0	5	22	4.4	1
2014	Oregon	10	0	—	21	28	75.0	207	7.4	1	0	148.9	4	10	2.5	0
2015	Oregon	6	3	2–1	61	99	61.6	580	5.9	5	4	119.4	34	92	2.7	0
2016	Oregon	0	0	—	DNP											
Career		24	3	2–1	90	140	64.3	844	6.0	6	5	121.9	43	124	2.9	1
