= Popo Aumavae =

American football player (born 1999)

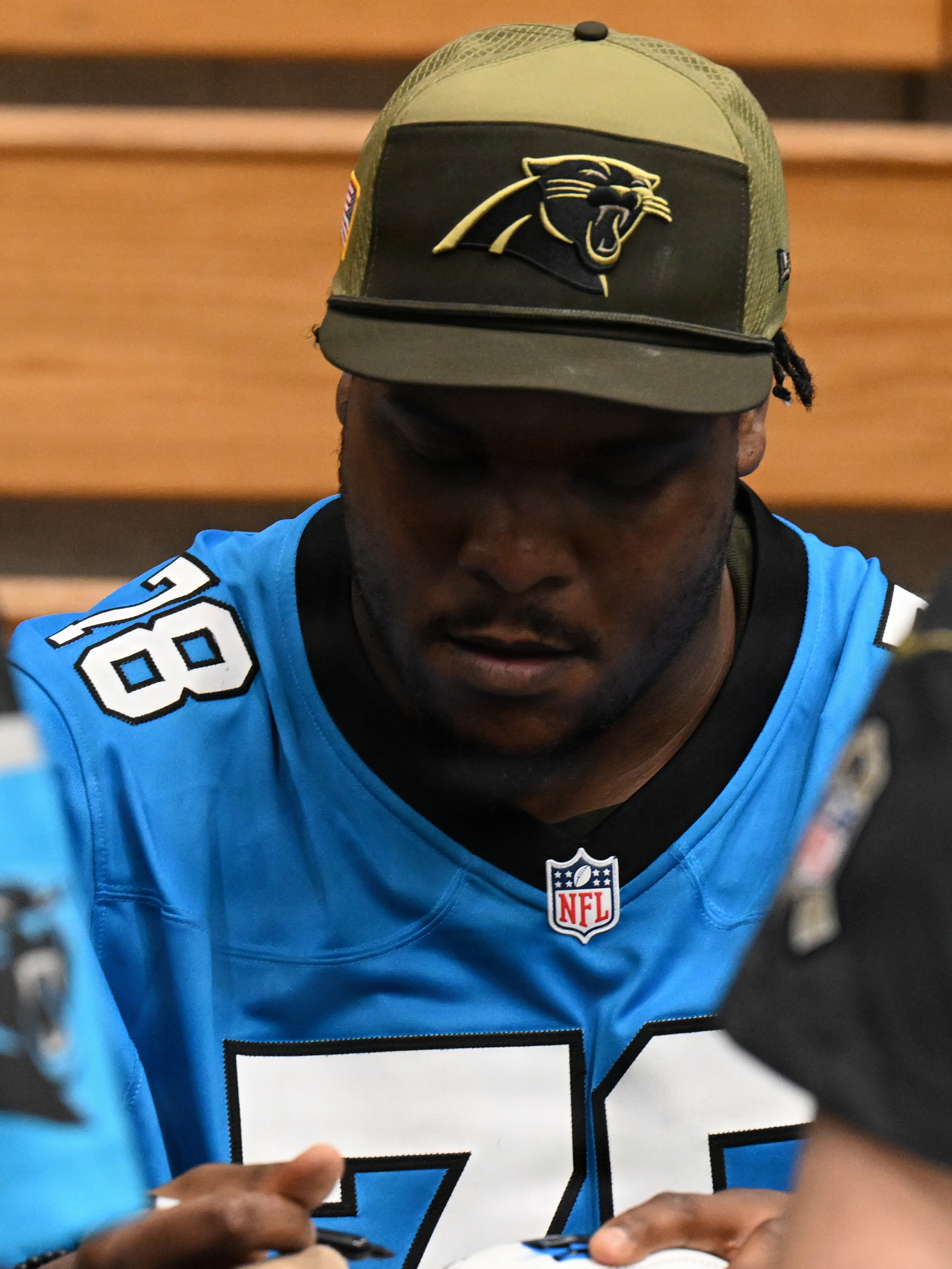
- Aumavae in 2026

Profile
- Position: Defensive tackle

Personal information
- Born: January 15, 1999 (age 27); Stockton, California, U.S.
- Listed height: 6 ft 3 in (1.91 m)
- Listed weight: 315 lb (143 kg)

Career information
- High school: St. Mary's (Stockton, California)
- College: Oregon (2017–2023)
- NFL draft: 2024: undrafted

Career history
- Carolina Panthers (2024–2025)
- Stats at Pro Football Reference

Popo Aumavae (born January 15, 1999) is an American professional football defensive tackle. He played college football for the Oregon Ducks.

== Early life ==
Coming out of high school, Aumavae was rated as a three star recruit, where he held offers from schools such as Arizona, Colorado, Michigan, Oregon, UCLA, Utah Washington and Washington State. Ultimately, Aumavae decided to commit to play college football for the Oregon Ducks.

== College career ==
Aumavae utilized a redshirt during his true freshman season in 2017. During Aumavae's first two seasons in 2018 and 2019, he totaled 20 tackles with six being for a loss, and three and a half sacks. In the 2020 season, Aumavae tallied 12 tackles. During the 2021 season, Aumavae tallied 36 tackles with three being for a loss, en route to being named first team all Pac-12. Aumavae missed the entirety of the 2022 season due to a season ending injury in his foot. During the 2023 season, Aumavae recorded 18 tackles with three being for a loss, and three sacks. After the conclusion of the 2023 season, Aumavae declared for the 2024 NFL draft.

== Professional career ==
Pre-draft measurables
Height	Weight	Arm length	Hand span	40-yard dash	10-yard split	20-yard split	20-yard shuttle	Three-cone drill	Vertical jump	Broad jump	Bench press
6 ft 3 1/2 in (1.92 m)	296 lb (134 kg)	32 7/8 in (0.84 m)	10 1/8 in (0.26 m)	5.22 s	1.82 s	3.00 s	4.83 s	8.03 s	29.5 in (0.75 m)	9 ft 0 in (2.74 m)	17 reps
All values from Pro Day

After not being selected in the 2024 NFL draft, Aumavae decided to sign with the Carolina Panthers as an undrafted free agent. He was also selected by the Arlington Renegades in the fourth round of the 2024 UFL draft on July 17. Aumavae was released with an injury designation on July 25.

On May 8, 2025, Aumavae was waived by the Panthers and reverted to injury reserve the following day.

On March 10, 2026, Aumavae was waived by the Panthers.
