= Jake Breeland =

American football tight end (born 1996)

Profile
- Position: Tight end

Personal information
- Born: September 20, 1996 (age 30); Mission Viejo, California
- Listed height: 6 ft 6 in (1.98 m)
- Listed weight: 252 lb (114 kg)

Career information
- High school: Trabuco Hills (Mission Viejo, California)
- College: Oregon
- NFL draft: 2020: undrafted

Career history
- Baltimore Ravens (2020)
- Stats at Pro Football Reference

Jacob Breeland (born September 20, 1996) is an American football tight end. He played college football at the University of Oregon and signed with the Ravens as an undrafted free agent in 2020.

== Early life ==
Breeland attended and played high school football at Trabuco Hills.

== College career ==
Breeland enrolled at Oregon on August 21, 2015. Breeland first saw the field in 2016 as a redshirt freshman, becoming Oregon's starting tight end for his remaining three years at the university. Breeland missed the last eight games of his senior season due to an ACL tear. Breeland declared for the 2020 NFL draft.

=== College career statistics ===
			Receiving			
Year	School	GP	Rec	Yds	Avg	TD
2016	Oregon	3	6	123	20.5	0
2017	Oregon	11	18	320	17.8	5
2018	Oregon	10	24	377	15.7	2
2019	Oregon	6	26	405	15.6	6
Career		30	74	1225	16.6	13

== Professional career ==
Pre-draft measurables
Height	Weight	Arm length	Hand span
6 ft 5 in (1.96 m)	252 lb (114 kg)	32 5/8 in (0.83 m)	9 7/8 in (0.25 m)
All values from NFL draft

=== Baltimore Ravens ===
Breeland signed with the Baltimore Ravens as an undrafted free agent in 2020. He was placed on the active/non-football injury list on July 27, 2020. He was waived with a non-football injury designation on August 5, 2020, and reverted to the team's reserve/non-football injury list the next day after clearing waivers. He was placed on the active/non-football injury list at the start of training camp again on July 21, 2021. He was waived with a non-football injury designation on August 9, 2021.
