= Tyler Johnstone =

American gridiron football player (born 1985)

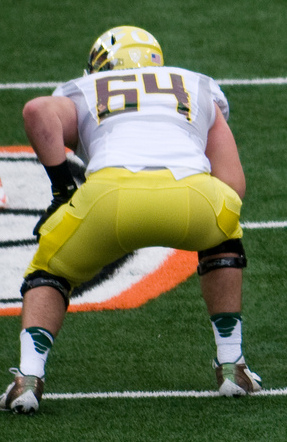
- Johnstone with the Oregon Ducks in 2012

Profile
- Position: Offensive lineman

Personal information
- Born: September 29, 1992 (age 34); Chandler, Arizona, U.S.
- Listed height: 6 ft 6 in (1.98 m)
- Listed weight: 295 lb (134 kg)

Career information
- College: Oregon
- CFL draft: 2018

Career history
- 2016: San Diego Chargers
- 2018–2020: Montreal Alouettes

Awards and highlights
- First-team All-Pac-12 (2015)
- Stats at CFL.ca

Tyler Johnstone (born September 29, 1992) is an American former professional football offensive lineman. He played for the Montreal Alouettes of the Canadian Football League (CFL). He played college football for the Oregon Ducks.

== Professional career ==
=== San Diego Chargers ===
After going undrafted in the 2016 NFL draft, Johnstone signed as a free agent with the San Diego Chargers of the National Football League on April 30, 2016. He spent the season on the injured reserve and was released in April 2017.

=== Montreal Alouettes ===
After obtaining dual Canadian-U.S. citizenship, Johnstone was drafted by the Alouettes on July 2, 2018 in the 2018 Supplemental CFL Draft, meaning that the Alouettes forfeited a first-round selection in the 2019 CFL draft to obtain his playing rights. He signed with the Alouettes on July 17, 2018. He played and started in his first game on July 21, 2018, his only game played in 2018. He became a free agent upon the expiry of his contract on February 9, 2021.
