= Don Pellum =

American football player and coach (born 1962)

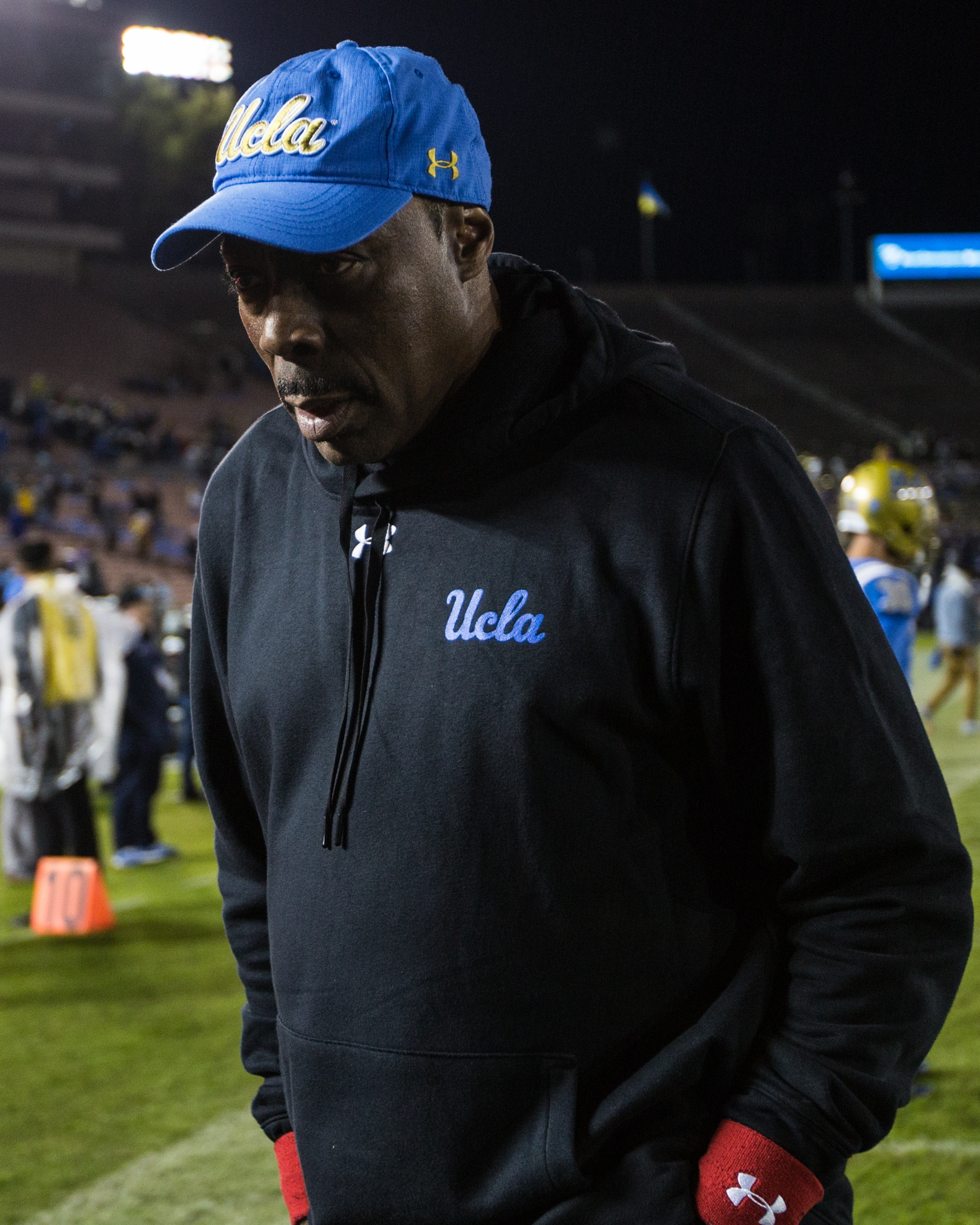

Biographical details
- Born: January 26, 1962 (age 64); Banning, California

Playing career
- 1980–1984: Oregon
- Position: Linebacker

Coaching career (HC unless noted)
- 1985–1986: Oregon (GA)
- 1987: Willamette (DL)
- 1988–1989: Oregon (RC)
- 1990–1992: Cal (RC)
- 1993–1995: Oregon (OLB)
- 1996: Oregon (S)
- 1997–1998: Oregon (LB)
- 1999: Oregon (DL)
- 2000–2013: Oregon (LB)
- 2014–2015: Oregon (DC/ILB)
- 2016: Oregon (LB)
- 2018–2021: UCLA (LB)

Administrative career (AD unless noted)
- 1992: Cal (assistant AD for student services)

Don W. Pellum (born January 26, 1962) is an American former college football coach. He most recently was the linebackers coach for the UCLA Bruins football team.

== Education and playing career ==
Pellum was a starting linebacker for Oregon under former head coach Rich Brooks. He earned a pair of undergraduate degrees in telecommunications and film as well as rhetoric and communications, from the University of Oregon in 1985. He also received a minor in sociology. Pellum proceeded to earn his master's degree in telecommunications and film the following year in addition to completing work toward his Ph.D.

== Coaching career ==
Pellum was a positions coach at the University of Oregon for 23 years; starting as a graduate assistant working with tight ends in 1985, and then coaching safeties and defensive lineman before serving as linebackers coach for 14 seasons.

He had two breaks from Oregon, serving as defensive line coach, strength and conditioning director, and academic coordinator at Willamette University in 1987. From 1990 to 1992, Pellum was the recruiting coordinator at the University of California, as well as the assistant athletics director for student services at Berkeley in 1992 before returning again to the Ducks in 1993.

On January 14, 2014, Pellum was named Oregon's defensive coordinator, replacing his former mentor Nick Aliotti.

On January 4, 2016, following one of the worst defensive seasons in Oregon football history, Pellum was demoted to linebackers coach.

On February 24, 2022, Pellum retired at UCLA after years as linebackers coach.
