= Steve Greatwood =

American football coach (born 1958)

Current position
- Team: Saarland Hurricanes (Germany)

Biographical details
- Born: August 15, 1958 (age 68); Eugene, Oregon
- Education: Winston Churchill High School

Coaching career (HC unless noted)
- 1980-1981: Oregon (GA)
- 1982-1993: Oregon (OL/TE)
- 1994: Oregon (OL)
- 1995: St. Louis Rams (TE)
- 1996: St. Louis Rams (OL)
- 1997: Maryland (OL)
- 1998-1999: USC (OL)
- 2000-2004: Oregon (DL)
- 2005–2016: Oregon (OL)
- 2017–2019: California (OL)

Accomplishments and honors

Awards
- National Offensive Line Coach of the Year - American Football Coaches Association (2008)

Steve Greatwood (born August 15, 1958 in Eugene, Oregon) is a retired American football coach.

== Career ==
Greatwood has over 30 years of coaching experience, including stints in the NFL (St. Louis Rams) and at four different colleges (Oregon, USC, Maryland, California). Greatwood was named the National Offensive Line Coach of the Year by the American Football Coaches Association in 2008.

Greatwood completed his playing career at Oregon with an appearance in the 1980 Hula Bowl and was the recipient of the Bob Officer Award, given to the Oregon player who makes a major contribution to the success of the program despite physical adversity. Greatwood later signed as a free agent with the San Francisco 49ers before initiating his coaching career as the Ducks’ defensive graduate assistant for two years.
