= Tyrell Crosby =

American football player (born 1995)

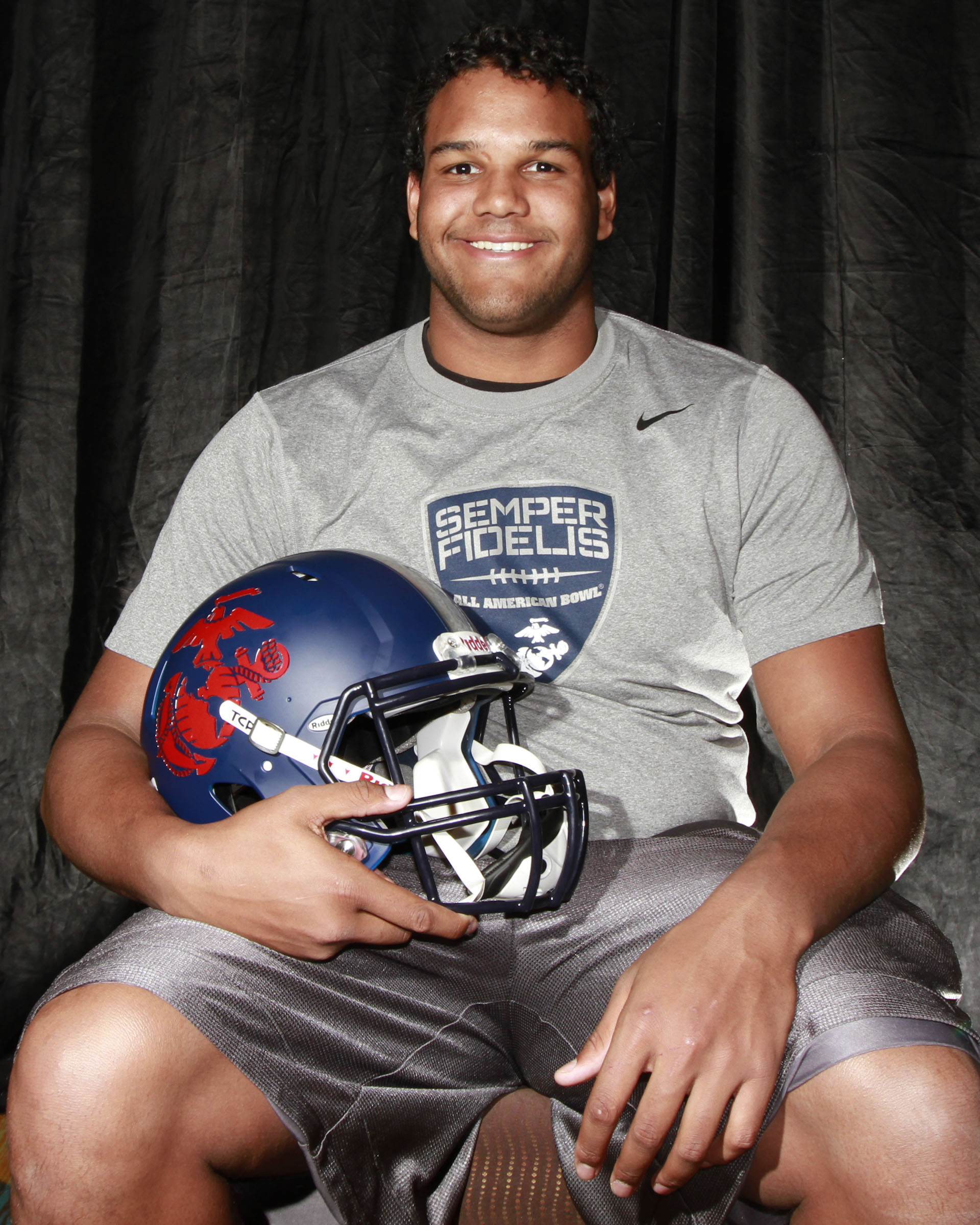
- Crosby c. 2014

No. 65
- Position: Offensive tackle

Personal information
- Born: September 5, 1995 (age 31); Bountiful, Utah, U.S.
- Listed height: 6 ft 5 in (1.96 m)
- Listed weight: 315 lb (143 kg)

Career information
- High school: Green Valley (Henderson, Nevada)
- College: Oregon (2014–2017)
- NFL draft: 2018: 5th round, 153rd overall pick

Career history
- Detroit Lions (2018–2021)

Awards and highlights
- Morris Trophy (2017); First-team All-Pac-12 (2017)

Career NFL statistics
- Games played: 38
- Games started: 18
- Stats at Pro Football Reference

Tyrell Crosby (born September 5, 1995) is an American former professional football player who was an offensive tackle for the Detroit Lions of the National Football League (NFL). He played college football for the Oregon Ducks.

== College career ==
Crosby missed the season opener of his junior season, but later returned as a starter before his season was ended due to injury. The injury came in the third game of the Duck's season against Nebraska, where Crosby broke his left foot. Crosby later announced that he would return to Oregon for his senior season. This season culminated in Crosby being named to the All-Pac-12 Conference first team. He was also invited to the 2018 Senior Bowl.

== Professional career ==
Pre-draft measurables
Height	Weight	Arm length	Hand span	40-yard dash	Three-cone drill	Vertical jump	Broad jump	Bench press
6 ft 4 5/8 in (1.95 m)	309 lb (140 kg)	35 1/4 in (0.90 m)	10 3/4 in (0.27 m)	5.23 s	7.89 s	30.0 in (0.76 m)	8 ft 9 in (2.67 m)	17 reps
All values from NFL Combine

Crosby was selected by the Detroit Lions in the fifth round (153rd overall) of the 2018 NFL draft.

On August 30, 2021, Crosby was waived/injured by the Lions and placed on injured reserve.
