= Henry Mondeaux =

American football player (born 1995)

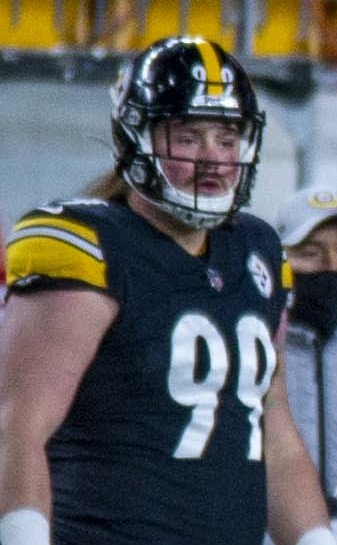
- Mondeaux with the Pittsburgh Steelers in 2020

Profile
- Position: Nose tackle

Personal information
- Born: September 19, 1995 (age 31); Portland, Oregon, U.S.
- Listed height: 6 ft 4 in (1.93 m)
- Listed weight: 280 lb (127 kg)

Career information
- High school: Jesuit (Beaverton, Oregon)
- College: Oregon
- NFL draft: 2018: undrafted

Career history
- New Orleans Saints (2018)*; Kansas City Chiefs (2019)*; Pittsburgh Steelers (2019–2021); New York Giants (2022); Jacksonville Jaguars (2023)*
- * Offseason or practice squad member only

Career NFL statistics
- Total tackles: 37
- Sacks: 2
- Fumble recoveries: 1
- Stats at Pro Football Reference

Henry Mondeaux (born September 19, 1995) is an American professional football nose tackle. He played college football at Oregon as an Edge rusher.

== Professional career ==
Pre-draft measurables
Height	Weight	Arm length	Hand span	40-yard dash	10-yard split	20-yard split	20-yard shuttle	Three-cone drill	Vertical jump	Broad jump	Bench press
6 ft 4 1/8 in (1.93 m)	297 lb (135 kg)	31 1/8 in (0.79 m)	8 5/8 in (0.22 m)	4.96 s	1.75 s	2.94 s	4.51 s	7.73 s	32.0 in (0.81 m)	9 ft 2 in (2.79 m)	25 reps
All values from Pro Day

=== New Orleans Saints ===
After playing four years at Oregon, Mondeaux was signed by the New Orleans Saints as an undrafted free agent on May 7, 2018. He was waived on September 1 and signed to the practice squad on December 31, where he spent the rest of the season.

=== Kansas City Chiefs ===
On January 26, 2019, Mondeaux signed with the Kansas City Chiefs on a reserve/future deal and was waived on May 3.

=== Pittsburgh Steelers ===
On May 13, 2019, Mondeaux signed with the Pittsburgh Steelers after a tryout, but was waived on August 31. A day later, he was signed to the Steelers' practice squad, where he spent the entire season.

On December 30, 2019, Mondeaux re-signed with the Steelers to a reserve/future contract, but was waived on September 5, 2020 and subsequently signed to the practice squad. On October 23, he was promoted to the active roster.

On September 3, 2021, Mondeaux was waived by the Steelers and re-signed to the practice squad. On September 20, 2021, Mondeaux was promoted to the active roster after an injury to Tyson Alualu.

On August 30, 2022, Mondeaux was waived by the Steelers.

=== New York Giants ===
On September 1, 2022, the New York Giants signed Mondeaux to their practice squad. Mondeaux was elevated from the practice squad for Week 3 and Week 4 games against the Dallas Cowboys and Chicago Bears. He was elevated from the practice squad for the third time this season for Week 10 game against the Houston Texans. He was promoted to the active roster on November 14.

=== Jacksonville Jaguars ===
On March 27, 2023, Mondeaux was signed by the Jacksonville Jaguars. He was placed on injured reserve on August 14, 2023. He was released on August 22, and re-signed to the practice squad on October 23. He was not signed to a reserve/future contract and thus became a free agent after the season when his practice squad contract expired.
