= Ugo Amadi =

American football player (born 1997)

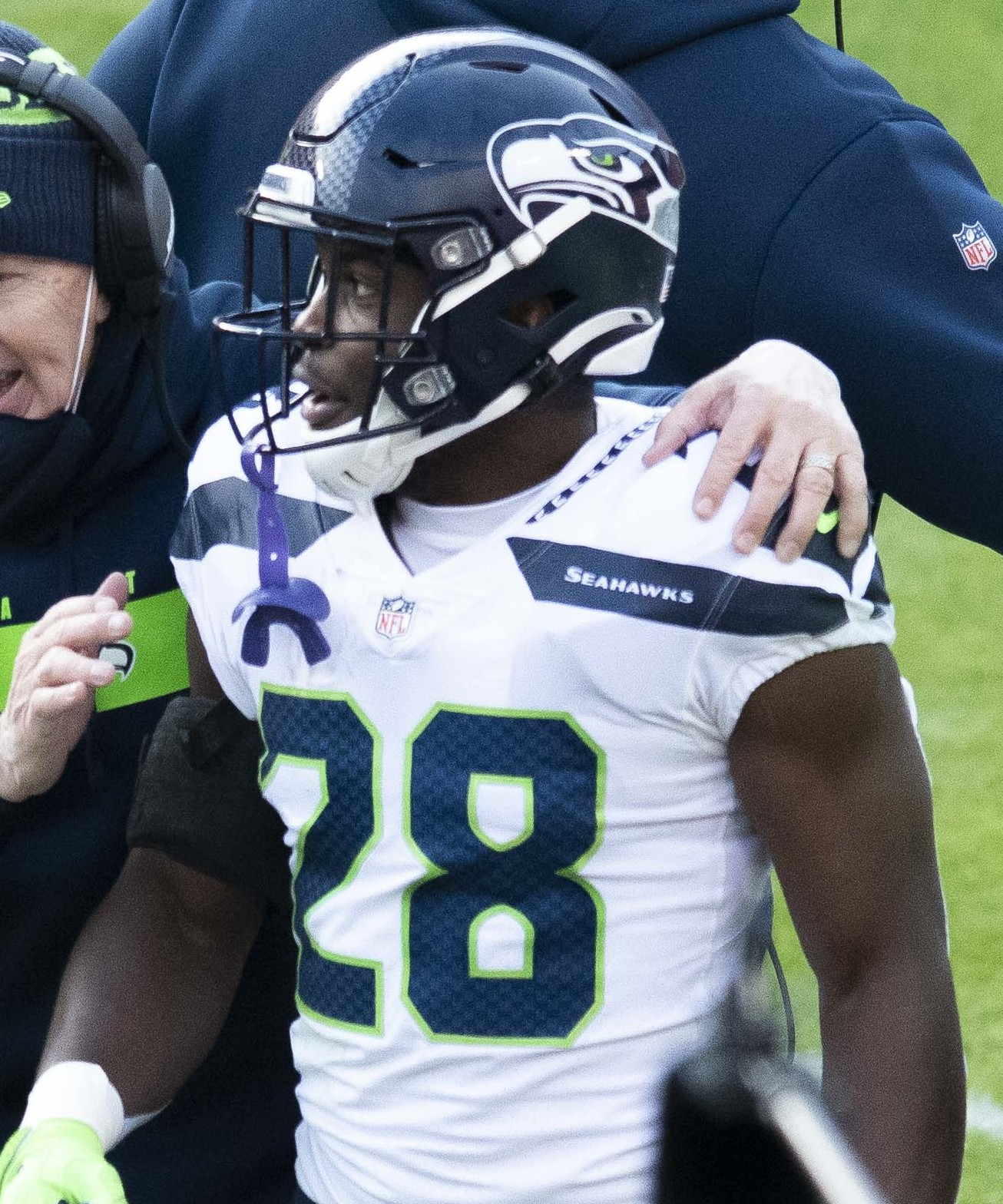
- Amadi with the Seattle Seahawks in 2020

Profile
- Position: Cornerback

Personal information
- Born: May 16, 1997 (age 29); Nashville, Tennessee, U.S.
- Listed height: 5 ft 9 in (1.75 m)
- Listed weight: 201 lb (91 kg)

Career information
- High school: John Overton (Nashville)
- College: Oregon (2015–2018)
- NFL draft: 2019: 4th round, 132nd overall pick

Career history
- Seattle Seahawks (2019–2021); Philadelphia Eagles (2022)*; Tennessee Titans (2022); Kansas City Chiefs (2022)*; New Orleans Saints (2023–2025); New York Giants (2026)*; Denver Broncos (2026)*
- * Offseason or practice squad member only

Awards and highlights
- Super Bowl champion (LVII); Lombardi Award (2018); Second-team All-Pac-12 (2018)

Career NFL statistics as of 2025
- Total tackles: 208
- Sacks: 2.0
- Forced fumbles: 2
- Fumble recoveries: 1
- Pass deflections: 22
- Interceptions: 1
- Stats at Pro Football Reference

Ugochukwu Amadi (born May 16, 1997) is an American professional football cornerback. He played college football for the Oregon Ducks and was selected by the Seattle Seahawks in the fourth round of the 2019 NFL draft. As a senior in 2018, he won the Lombardi Award.

== College career ==
Amadi signed with Oregon out of John Overton High School in Nashville, Tennessee as a consensus four-star cornerback over numerous Power 5 offers. Amadi played in all 51 games and had 34 starts for the Ducks from 2015 to 2018 and finished with 165 total tackles, 9.5 tackles for a loss for 54 yards, three sacks for 16 yards, eight interceptions for 122 yards and two touchdowns, 33 passes defended, four forced fumbles, and two fumble recoveries on defense.

== Professional career ==
Pre-draft measurables
Height	Weight	Arm length	Hand span	Wingspan	40-yard dash	10-yard split	20-yard split	20-yard shuttle	Three-cone drill	Vertical jump	Broad jump	Bench press
5 ft 9 3/8 in (1.76 m)	199 lb (90 kg)	31 3/4 in (0.81 m)	9 1/2 in (0.24 m)	6 ft 5 1/8 in (1.96 m)	4.51 s	1.48 s	2.62 s	4.19 s	7.21 s	34.0 in (0.86 m)	9 ft 7 in (2.92 m)	18 reps
All values from NFL Combine/Pro Day

=== Seattle Seahawks ===
Amadi was selected by the Seattle Seahawks in the fourth round (132nd overall) of the 2019 NFL draft. He made 16 appearances for Seattle during his rookie campaign, logging one fumble recovery and 17 combined tackles. Amadi made 14 appearances (five starts) for the Seahawks during the 2020 season, recording seven pass deflections, one forced fumble, and 54 combined tackles.

Amadi played in all 17 games (including seven starts) for Seattle during the 2021 campaign, compiling one interception, six pass deflections, one forced fumble, and 54 combined tackles.

=== Philadelphia Eagles ===
On August 15, 2022, Amadi was traded to the Philadelphia Eagles in exchange for tight end J. J. Arcega-Whiteside.

=== Tennessee Titans ===
On August 24, 2022, less than 10 days after being traded to Philadelphia, Amadi was traded to the Tennessee Titans paired with Philadelphia's 2024 seventh round pick in exchange for Tennessee's 2024 sixth round pick. He made two appearances for the Titans, recording five combined tackles. Amadi was waived by the Titans on October 31.

=== Kansas City Chiefs ===
On November 3, 2022, Amadi was signed to the practice squad of the Kansas City Chiefs. With the Chiefs, he appeared in one game, logging one tackle. Amadi became a Super Bowl champion when the Chiefs defeated the Philadelphia Eagles in Super Bowl LVII.

=== New Orleans Saints ===
On March 7, 2023, Amadi signed with the New Orleans Saints. He played all 17 games primarily on special teams.

On March 19, 2024, Amadi re-signed with the Saints. He was released on August 27, and re-signed to the practice squad. On October 26, Amadi was signed to the active roster. In 11 appearances (5 starts) for the Saints, he recorded 7 pass deflections, 2.0 sacks, and 65 combined tackles.

On March 24, 2025, Amadi re-signed with the Saints on a one-year contract.

=== New York Giants ===
On August 13, 2026, Amadi signed with the New York Giants. He was released by the Giants on August 29.

=== Denver Broncos ===
On October 9, 2026, Amadi signed with the Denver Broncos practice squad. On October 27, he was released and re-signed six days later. On November 10, he was released.

== Personal life ==
Born in the United States, Amadi is of Nigerian descent.
