= Charles Nelson (wide receiver) =

American gridiron football player (born 1995)

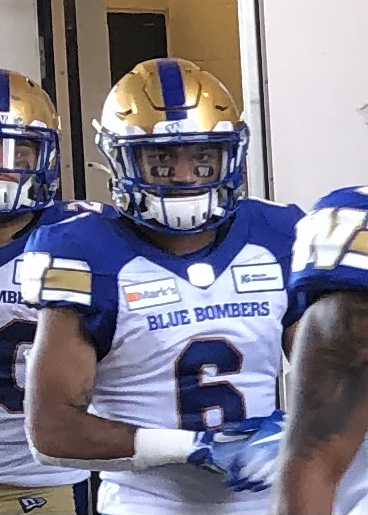
- Nelson with the Winnipeg Blue Bombers in 2021

No. 4
- Positions: Wide receiver, return specialist

Personal information
- Born: October 28, 1995 (age 31); Daytona Beach, Florida, U.S.
- Listed height: 5 ft 8 in (1.73 m)
- Listed weight: 169 lb (77 kg)

Career information
- High school: Seabreeze (Daytona Beach)
- College: Oregon
- NFL draft: 2018: undrafted

Career history
- 2018–2021: Winnipeg Blue Bombers
- 2022: Edmonton Elks

Awards and highlights
- 2× Grey Cup champion (2019, 2021); First-team All-Pac-12 (2015); Second-team All-Pac-12 (2014)

Career CFL statistics
- Return yards: 1,109
- Stats at CFL.ca

Charles Nelson (born October 28, 1995) is an American former professional football wide receiver and return specialist who played in the Canadian Football League (CFL). He played college football at Oregon, where he earned all-conference honors as a return specialist in 2014 and 2015.

== College career ==
At Oregon, Nelson was one of the program's most versatile players, splitting time at wide receiver, cornerback, and returning kicks and punts.

== Professional career ==
After going undrafted in the 2018 NFL draft, Nelson had tryouts with the Kansas City Chiefs and Indianapolis Colts but did not sign with them.

=== Winnipeg Blue Bombers ===
Nelson signed with the Winnipeg Blue Bombers as a free agent on May 25, 2018, and retired a week later. He returned to the Blue Bombers in September, joining their practice roster for five games before playing in the season finale against Edmonton. Nelson played in four games in 2019 before suffering a season-ending foot injury. He still earned his first Grey Cup when Winnipeg won the 107th Grey Cup.

Nelson signed a two-year contract extension with the Blue Bombers in 2021. Nelson was moved to the practice roster, and eventually released at the end of the season.

=== Edmonton Elks ===
On February 5, 2022, the Edmonton Elks announced the signing of Nelson. He was released on August 16, 2022.
