= List of Oregon Ducks football All-Americans =

The Oregon Ducks college football team competes as part of the National Collegiate Athletic Association (NCAA) Division I Football Bowl Subdivision (FBS), and represents the University of Oregon in the North Division of the Pac-12 Conference (Pac-12). All-America selections are individual player recognitions made after each season when numerous publications release lists of their ideal team. The NCAA recognizes five All-America lists: the Associated Press (AP), American Football Coaches Association (AFCA), the Football Writers Association of America (FWAA), Sporting News (SN), and the Walter Camp Football Foundation (WCFF). In order for an honoree to earn a "consensus" selection, he must be selected as first team in three of the five lists recognized by the NCAA, and "unanimous" selections must be selected as first team in all five lists.

Since the establishment of the team in 1894, Oregon has had 40 players honored a total of 58 times as First Team All-America for their performance on the field of play. Included in these selections are 11 consensus selections, 5 of which were Unanimous All-American selections earned by LaMichael James in 2010, Marcus Mariota in the 2014 season in which he won the Heisman Trophy, Penei Sewell in 2019, Kayvon Thibodeaux in 2021 and Jackson Powers-Johnson in 2023.

== Key ==
Consensus selection	NCAA Recognizes 3 or more of AFCA, AP, FWAA, SN, and WCFF as Consensus Selection
Unanimous selection	NCAA Recognizes all 5 of AFCA, AP, FWAA, SN, and WCFF as Unanimous Selection

=== Selectors ===
AAB	All-America Board	AFCA	American Football Coaches Association	AP	Associated Press	USA	USA Today	CBS	Columbia Broadcasting System	ACT	The Action Network
CO	Collier's Weekly	SI	Sports Illustrated	CP	Central Press Association	CSW	College Sports Writers	B/R	Bleacher Report	ATH	The Athletic
DW	Davis J. Walsh	ES	Ed Sullivan	FN	The Football News	FWAA	Football Writers Association of America	ESPN	ESPN	AS	Athlon Sports
INS	International News Service	KCS	Kansas City Star	LAT	Los Angeles Times	LIB	Liberty Magazine	RVLS	Rivals.com	FOX	Fox Sports
LK	Look magazine	NANA	North American Newspaper Alliance	NB	Norman E. Brown	NEA	Newspaper Editors Association	SCT	Scout.com	UP	United Press
NL	Navy Log	NYEP	New York Evening Post	NYS	New York Sun	PFW	Pro Football Weekly	UPI	United Press International	WD	Walter Dobbins
PD	Parke H. Davis	SH	Scripps-Howard	Time	Time Magazine	SN	Sporting News	WCFF	Walter Camp Football Foundation	CFN	College Football Network

== Oregon Duck Football First Team All-Americans ==
Year	Player name	Position	Selector(s)
1931	George Christensen	TE	
1934	Raymond Morse	TE	
1945	Jake Leight	HB	YANK; NYS
1948	Norm Van Brocklin	QB	AP; FWAA; UP; NEA; CP; INS;
1954	George Shaw	QB	
1961	Steve Barnett	T	
1962	Steve Barnett	T	AFCA; FWAA
1962	Mel Renfro	HB	WCFF; SN; Time; UPI
1963	Mel Renfro	HB	SN; Time
1964	Bob Berry	QB	AFCA
1967	Jim Smith	DB	SN; NEA; Time
1970	Bob Newland	WR	
1971	Bobby Moore	RB	SN; Time; FN; NEA
1971	Tom Drougas	T	SN
1983	Gary Zimmerman	G	
1985	Lew Barnes	WR	FWAA
1989	Chris Oldham	CB	FWAA
1994	Herman O'Berry	CB	FWAA
1994	Chad Cota	SS	
1995	Alex Molden	CB	
2004	Adam Snyder	OG	ESPN
2005	Haloti Ngata	DT	AP; FWAA; WCFF; SN; SI; ESPN; CFN; RVLS
2006	Jonathan Stewart	RB	PFW
2007	Max Unger	C	SI
2007	Jonathan Stewart	RB	AFCA
2008	Max Unger	C	CBS; PFW
2008	Nick Reed	DE	WCFF
2010	Cliff Harris	PR	FWAA; SN; CBS; ESPN; PFW; SI; RVLS
2010	LaMichael James	RB	AFCA; AP; FWAA; SN; WCFF; CBS; CFN; ESPN; SI; RVLS; SCT
2011	LaMichael James	RB	WCFF; AFCA
2012	Dion Jordan	DE	PFW
2012	Kenjon Barner	RB	AFCA; FWAA; SN; WCFF; ESPN; SI; SCT
2013	Hroniss Grasu	C	SI; AS
2013	Ifo Ekpre-Olomu	DB	ESPN; FOX
2014	Marcus Mariota	QB	AFCA; AP; FWAA; SN; WCFF; CBS; USA; ESPN; SCT; FOX; SI
2014	Ifo Ekpre-Olomu	DB	AP; AFCA; WCFF; USAT; SI; FOX
2014	Hroniss Grasu	C	SN; SI
2014	Jake Fisher	OT	FWAA
2015	DeForest Buckner	DE	USA
2019	Shane Lemieux	OG	SI
2019	Penei Sewell	OT	AFCA; AP; FWAA; SN; WCFF; SI; ESPN; B/R; CBS; ATH; USA
2021	Verone McKinley III	S	AP; ESPN; CBS; SN; USA; WCFF
2021	Kayvon Thibodeaux	DE	ATH; WCFF; FWAA; AP; SN; AFCA
2021	T. J. Bass	OG	ACT
2023	Bo Nix	QB	CFN
2023	Troy Franklin	WR	CFN
2023	Jackson Powers-Johnson	C	CBS; USA; ATH; B/R; WCFF; FWAA; AP;SN;AFCA; FOX
2024	Josh Conerly Jr.	OT	ATH
2024	Dillon Gabriel	QB	FWAA; USA; SI
2024	Derrick Harmon	DT	CFN
2025	Emmanuel Pregnon	OG	AP; SN; ATH; CBS; SI; USAT
2025	Iapani Laloulu	C	FWAA
2025	A'Mauri Washington	DT	CBS
2025	Bryce Boettcher	LB	SI
2025	Dillon Thieneman	DB	ATH; ESPN
