= 2013 Oregon Ducks football team =

American college football season

2013 Oregon Ducks football

Pac-12 North Division co-champion Alamo Bowl champion

Alamo Bowl, W 30–7 vs. Texas
- Conference: Pac-12 Conference
- North Division

Ranking
- Coaches: No. 9
- AP: No. 9
- Record: 11–2 (7–2 Pac-12)
- Head coach: Mark Helfrich (1st season)
- Offensive coordinator: Scott Frost (1st season)
- Offensive scheme: No-huddle spread option
- Defensive coordinator: Nick Aliotti (17th season)
- Base defense: Hybrid 3–4
- Captain: Game captains
- Home stadium: Autzen Stadium

Uniform
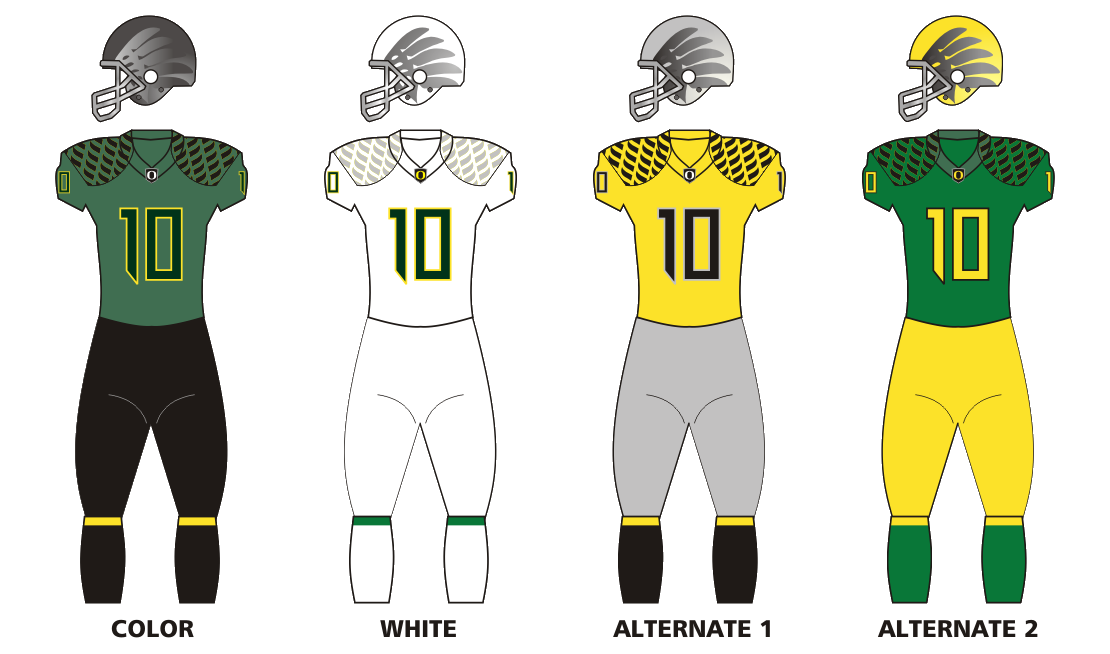

2013 Pac-12 Conference football standings
	Conf.			Overall
Team	W		L	W		L
North Division
No. 11 Stanford xy$	7	–	2	11	–	3
No. 9 Oregon x	7	–	2	11	–	2
No. 25 Washington	5	–	4	9	–	4
Oregon State	4	–	5	7	–	6
Washington State	4	–	5	6	–	7
California	0	–	9	1	–	11
South Division
No. 21 Arizona State xy	8	–	1	10	–	4
No. 16 UCLA	6	–	3	10	–	3
No. 19 USC	6	–	3	10	–	4
Arizona	4	–	5	8	–	5
Utah	2	–	7	5	–	7
Colorado	1	–	8	4	–	8
Championship: Stanford 38, Arizona State 14
$ – BCS representative as conference champion; x – Division champion/co-champions; y – Championship game participant; Rankings from AP Poll

The 2013 Oregon Ducks football team represented the University of Oregon in the 2013 NCAA Division I FBS football season. The team was led by first year head coach Mark Helfrich and played their home games at Autzen Stadium for the 47th consecutive year. They were a member of the Pac-12 Conference in the North Division.

The Ducks had high hopes coming off of a 12–1 (8–1) season a victory in the 2013 Fiesta Bowl; many considered them a contender for the BCS national championship game the following year. However, these hopes were thrown into question shortly after their Fiesta Bowl victory, on January 16, 2013. Head coach Chip Kelly announced that he had agreed to terms with the Philadelphia Eagles to become their new head coach after several disappointing seasons under Andy Reid; Kelly brought Oregon defensive line coach Jerry Azzinaro along with him to Philadelphia.

As they have done in every case of hiring a new head coach since 1995, the Ducks hired from within and promoted fourth-year offensive coordinator and quarterbacks coach Mark Helfrich to the head coach position. Along with the head coach change, wide receivers coach Scott Frost was promoted to offensive coordinator and quarterbacks coach, and Duke wide receivers coach Matt Lubick and Arizona Cardinals defensive line coach Ron Aiken were hired to fill their respective positions on Oregon's staff.

Oregon started the season ranked third behind Ohio State and Alabama, and rose to second after their first game, a 66–3 win over Nicholls State in Week 1. They continued their winning ways, posting double-digit wins over Virginia, Tennessee, California, Colorado, Washington, Washington State and UCLA, and eventually found themselves in a duel with Florida State over the number 2 spot in the BCS poll, with Alabama at number 1. The wheels came off though, as they did the year previously, against Stanford, losing 26–20 on the road. The Ducks would rebound with a home win over Utah, but lose again at home to Arizona, the Ducks’ first loss to an unranked foe since 2009.

Sitting at 9–2 (7–2) and out of the BCS bowl picture for the first time in four years, Oregon had the Civil War left to play. Both Oregon and Oregon State were coming off of losses and had no major spoils to play for. Oregon came from behind in a back-and-forth fourth quarter and scored a touchdown (and failed to convert the two-point attempt) with 29 seconds left to win, 36–35.

Finishing the regular season at 10–2 (7–2) Oregon had extended winning streaks in two major rivalries, making it 10 years in a row against Washington, and six years in a row against Oregon State, as well as achieving a sixth consecutive 10-win season and an undefeated season at home for the first time in three years.

On December 8, 2013, the Ducks were invited to play in the Alamo Bowl against Texas in what would be Texas head coach Mack Brown and Oregon defensive coordinator Nick Aliotti's last games before retiring. Oregon won the Alamo bowl 30–7, tying a school record set from 1999 to 2001 for consecutive bowl wins at three, with rookie head coach Mark Helfrich becoming the first Oregon head coach to go to and win a bowl game in his rookie year (Rich Brooks won his first bowl game, after 12 years as head coach at Oregon, Mike Belloti and Chip Kelly each went to and lost a bowl game in their first years). Oregon finished the season at 11–2, only their fifth season with 11 or more wins in 118 years of football.

== Departing players ==
No juniors or redshirt sophomores declared early eligibility for the 2013 NFL draft.

Num	Player	Position	Starter	Class	Drafted	Round	Pick	Team	Notes
10	Rahsaan Vaughn	WR	N	SR	N				
20	John Boyett	FS	Y	SR	Y	6	192	Indianapolis Colts	Released prior to regular season due to arrest
36	Jennings Stewart	TE	N	SR	N				
46	Michael Clay	LB	Y	SR	N				Undrafted free agent signed by Miami Dolphins
47	Kiko Alonso	LB	Y	SR	Y	2	46	Buffalo Bills	2013 NFL Defensive Rookie of the Year; NFL All-Rookie Team
49	Jackson Rice	P	Y	SR	N				
59	Jeff Palmer	LS	N	SR	N				
60	Ryan Clanton	OL	Y	SR	N				
61	Nick Cody	OL	Y	SR	N				
65	Isaac Remington	DT	N	SR	N				Undrafted free agent signed by Philadelphia Eagles
74	Kyle Long	OL	Y	SR	Y	1	20	Chicago Bears	2014 Pro Bowl; NFL All-Rookie Team
77	Carson York	OL	Y	SR	N				
87	Nick Morrison	DL	N	SR	N				
89	Will Murphy	WR	N	SR	N				
93	Rob Beard	PK	Y	SR	N				
96	Dion Jordan	DE	Y	SR	Y	1	3	Miami Dolphins	

== Preseason ==
=== Returning starters ===
==== Offense ====
Player	Class	Position
Marcus Mariota	(redshirt) Sophomore	Quarterback
Josh Huff	Senior	Wide receiver
Keanon Lowe	Junior	Wide receiver
Daryle Hawkins	Senior	Wide receiver
Colt Lyerla	Junior	Tight end
Tyler Johnstone	(redshirt) Sophomore	Left tackle
Hroniss Grasu	Junior	Center
Jake Fisher	Junior	Right tackle

==== Defense ====
Player	Class	Position
Taylor Hart	Senior	Defensive end
Wade Keli'ikipi	Senior	Defensive tackle
Boseko Lokombo	Senior	Outside Linebacker
Terrence Mitchell	Junior	Cornerback
Ifo Ekpre-Olomu	Junior	Cornerback
Brian Jackson	Senior	Safety
Avery Patterson	Senior	Safety

==== Special teams ====
Player	Class	Position
De'Anthony Thomas	Junior	Returner
Alejandro Maldonado	Senior	Place kicker
Drew Howell	Senior	Long snapper

=== Recruiting ===
College recruiting (2013)
Name	Hometown	School	Height	Weight	40^{‡}	Commit date
Devon Allen; WR	Phoenix, Arizona	Brophy College Preparatory	6 ft 1 in (1.85 m)	190 lb (86 kg)	4.5	Jan 25, 2013
Devon Allen; WR	Recruit ratings: Scout: Rivals:					
Kani Benoit; RB	Phoenix, Arizona	Phoenix Thunderbird HS	6 ft 0 in (1.83 m)	200 lb (91 kg)	4.5	Feb 3, 2013
Kani Benoit; RB	Recruit ratings: Scout: Rivals:					
Doug Brenner; C	Portland, Oregon	Jesuit HS	6 ft 3.5 in (1.92 m)	275 lb (125 kg)	4.9	Sep 9, 2012
Doug Brenner; C	Recruit ratings: Scout: Rivals:					
Darren Carrington; WR	San Diego, California	Horizon Jr Sr HS	6 ft 2 in (1.88 m)	175 lb (79 kg)	4.6	Jun 21, 2012
Darren Carrington; WR	Recruit ratings: Scout: Rivals:					
Elijah George; OL	Las Vegas, Nevada	Arbor View HS	6 ft 4 in (1.93 m)	240 lb (110 kg)	4.9	Jan 27, 2013
Elijah George; OL	Recruit ratings: Scout: Rivals:					
Damion Hobbs; QB	Cedar Hill, Texas	Cedar Hill HS	6 ft 2 in (1.88 m)	190 lb (86 kg)	4.7	Jan 30, 2013
Damion Hobbs; QB	Recruit ratings: Scout: Rivals:					
Jovonni Temple; TE	Oakland, California	Deer Valley HS	6 ft 4.5 in (1.94 m)	225 lb (102 kg)	4.6	Dec 23, 2012
Jovonni Temple; TE	Recruit ratings: Scout: Rivals:					
John Mundt; TE	Modesto, California	Central Catholic HS	6 ft 4 in (1.93 m)	225 lb (102 kg)	4.8	Jun 18, 2012
John Mundt; TE	Recruit ratings: Scout: Rivals:					
Jake Pisarcik; OG	Medford, New Jersey	Shawnee HS	6 ft 4 in (1.93 m)	278 lb (126 kg)	n/a	Dec 18, 2012
Jake Pisarcik; OG	Recruit ratings: Scout: Rivals:					
Tyree Robinson; WR	San Diego, California	Lincoln Senior HS	6 ft 2 in (1.88 m)	200 lb (91 kg)	n/a	Sep 23, 2012
Tyree Robinson; WR	Recruit ratings: Scout: Rivals:					
Tyrell Robinson; OLB	San Diego, California	Lincoln Senior HS	6 ft 3 in (1.91 m)	208 lb (94 kg)	n/a	Sep 23, 2012
Tyrell Robinson; OLB	Recruit ratings: Scout: Rivals:					
Chris Seisay; CB	American Canyon, California	American Canyon HS	6 ft 2 in (1.88 m)	175 lb (79 kg)	4.5	Jun 22, 2012
Chris Seisay; CB	Recruit ratings: Scout: Rivals:					
Thomas Tyner; RB	Beaverton, Oregon	Aloha HS	6 ft 1 in (1.85 m)	218 lb (99 kg)	4.4	Oct 18, 2012
Thomas Tyner; RB	Recruit ratings: Scout: Rivals:					
Evan Voeller; OT	West Linn, Oregon	West Linn HS	6 ft 5 in (1.96 m)	285 lb (129 kg)	n/a	Apr 30, 2012
Evan Voeller; OT	Recruit ratings: Scout: Rivals:					
Joe Walker; MLB	Wilmington, California	Los Angeles Harbor	6 ft 3 in (1.91 m)	230 lb (100 kg)	4.5	Dec 9, 2012
Joe Walker; MLB	Recruit ratings: Scout: Rivals:					
Juwaan Williams; SS	Tucker, Georgia	Tucker HS	6 ft 1 in (1.85 m)	180 lb (82 kg)	4.7	Jan 28, 2013
Juwaan Williams; SS	Recruit ratings: Scout: Rivals:					
Matt Wogan; K	Indian Trail, North Carolina	Porter Ridge HS	6 ft 2 in (1.88 m)	195 lb (88 kg)	n/a	Jun 26, 2012
Matt Wogan; K	Recruit ratings: Scout: Rivals:					
Overall recruit ranking:
‡ Refers to 40-yard dash; Note: In many cases, Scout, Rivals, 247Sports, On3, and ESPN may conflict in their listings of height, weight and 40 time.; In these cases, the average was taken. ESPN grades are on a 100-point scale.; Sources: "2013 Team Ranking". Rivals.com.

=== Awards watch lists ===
The following Oregon players appeared on preseason award watch lists

Maxwell Award – College Football Player of the Year

- Marcus Mariota
- De'Anthony Thomas

Walter Camp Award – Player of the Year

- Marcus Mariota
- De'Anthony Thomas

Davey O'Brien Award – Best Quarterback

- Marcus Mariota

Doak Walker Award – Best Runningback

- De'Anthony Thomas

Biletnikoff Award – Best Receiver

- Josh Huff

Mackey Award – Most Outstanding Collegiate Tight End

- Colt Lyerla

Rimington Trophy – Most Outstanding Collegiate Center

- Hroniss Grasu

Outland Trophy – Best Interior Lineman in College Football

- Hroniss Grasu
- Tyler Johnstone

Lombardi Award – Best Lineman

- Hroniss Grasu
- Tyler Johnstone

Bednarik Award – Defensive Player of the Year

- Ifo Ekpre-Olomu

Bronko Nagurski Trophy – Most Outstanding Defensive Player

- Ifo Ekpre-Olomu
- Terrence Mitchell

Jim Thorpe Award – Best Defensive Back

- Ifo Ekpre-Olomu
- Terrence Mitchell

Butkus Award – Best Linebacker

- Boseko Lokombo

=== Spring football ===
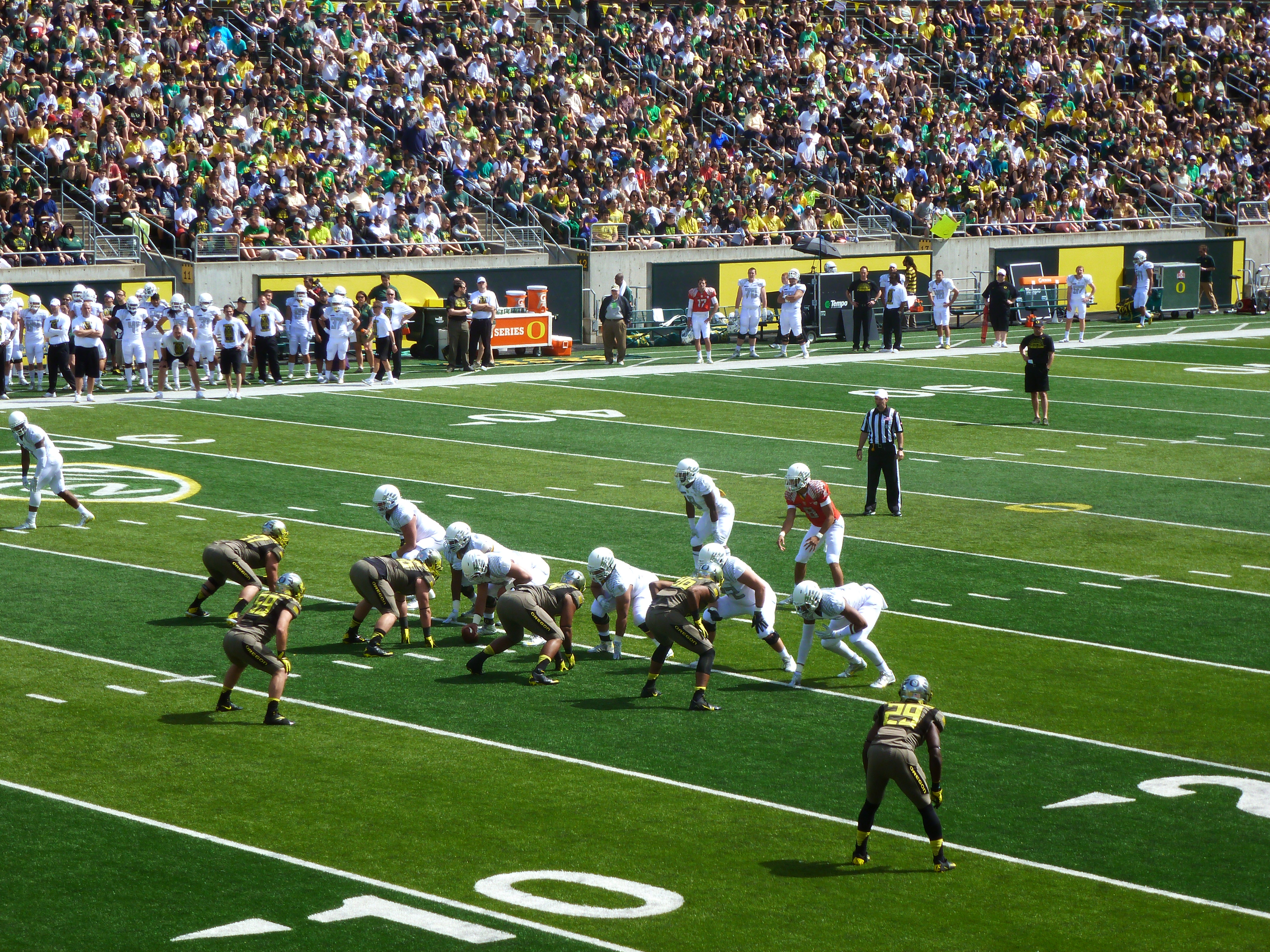
Marcus Mariota prepares to take a snap in the 2013 Oregon Spring Game

On April 27, 2013, the Oregon Ducks capped off their spring football practices with the traditional Spring Football Game, open to the public held at Autzen Stadium. As has been the practice for many years, in order to gain admission to the game each fan must donate at least three non-perishable food items to Food for Lane County on their way in the stadium. Following a record donation year in 2012, Oregon fans again donated over 70,000 pounds of food to the charity.

Donating food is not the only non-football activity for a good cause that is associated with the Oregon Spring Game, the game is played in honor of the United States Armed Forces and specifically the several reserve and guard units stationed close to Eugene. The football players will wear special made Nike uniforms that have "Support Our Troops" on the back where the player's last name is usually found, along with American Flags on the sleeves. During half-time a group of Marine Corps enlistees took the oath of enlistment on the field. Following the game the players line up on the north sideline, with an equal number of service-members from each branch of the military lining up on the south sideline. The two groups meet in the middle of the field where the players then remove their jersey and give it to a service-member, the service-member in turns presents the football player with a challenge coin. The tradition of the Spring Game being dedicated to supporting the military is part of the legacy of former head coach Chip Kelly, following the funeral of a local soldier in 2010, which he attended.

The 2013 iteration of the game was the first under new head coach Mark Helfrich and it also implemented a new scoring system for the first time in several years. Traditionally the offensive and defensive coordinators act as head coaches of two different teams, which are selected via a draft, the two teams then face off in a normally scored exhibition game. Due to a rash of injuries on both sides of the ball the format was tweaked so that it was simply the offense versus the defense, with a modified points system. The offense would score normally, with six points for touchdowns with the opportunity for point after attempts, and three points for field goals. The defense would follow normal rules for touchdowns as well, but would also gain three points for turnovers and one point every time that they kept the offense from scoring. The points system led to a lopsided victory by the offense, 65–0.

Oregon Ducks Spring Game – Game summary

Quarter	1	2	3	4	Total
White (Offense)	14	38	7	6	65
Green (Defense)	0	0	0	0	0

at Autzen Stadium • Eugene, Oregon

- Date: April 27th, 2013
- Game time: 11:00am PST
- Game weather: Temperature: 68 °F (20 °C) • Wind SW 1 mph (1.6 km/h) • Weather: Sunny
- Game attendance: 36,588
- TV: Pac-12 Network
- http://www.goducks.com/ViewArticle.dbml?DB_OEM_ID=500&ATCLID=207450081

Game information

First quarter

- WHITE – Byron Marshall 2-yard run (Alejandro Maldonado kick)
- WHITE – Josh Huff 7-yard pass from Marcus Mariota (Maldonado kick)

Second quarter

- WHITE – Huff 16-yard pass from Mariota (Maldonado kick)
- WHITE – Jordan Thompson 1-yard run (Hayden Cook kick)
- WHITE – Jeff Bedbury 15-yard pass from Jeff Lockie (Maldonado kick)
- WHITE – Blake Stanton 25-yard pass from Jake Rodrigues (Erick Solis kick)
- WHITE – Bralon Addison 49-yard pass from Lockie (Cook kick)
- WHITE – Maldonado 48-yard field goal

Third quarter

- WHITE – Lane Roseberry 8-yard run (Solis kick)

Fourth quarter

- WHITE – Chance Allen 20-yard pass from Rodrigues (PAT failed)

Top passers

- WHITE – Jeff Lockie 22–28, 217 yards, 2 TD
- WHITE – Jake Rodrigues 13–19, 165 yards, 2 TD
- WHITE – Marcus Mariota 13–15, 169 yards, 2 TD

Top rushers

- WHITE – Byron Marshall, 6 attempts, 60 yards, 1 TD
- WHITE – Jordan Thompson, 10 attempts, 54 yards, 1 TD
- WHITE – Ayele Ford, 9 attempts, 35 yards

Top receiving

- WHITE – Eric Dungy, 9 receptions, 56 yards
- WHITE – Bralon Addison, 8 receptions, 136 yards, 1 TD
- WHITE – Blake Stanton, 5 receptions, 73 yard, 1 TD

Top tackler

- GREEN – Christian French, 9 tackles, 7 solo, 1 TFL, 1 sack
- GREEN – Dior Mathis, 7 tackles, 5 solo, 1 TFL
- GREEN – Oshay Dunmore, 7 tackles, 4 solo

== Schedule ==
Date	Time	Opponent	Rank	Site	TV	Result	Attendance
August 31	1:00 pm	Nicholls State*	No. 3	Autzen Stadium; Eugene, OR	FS1	W 66–3	57,769
September 7	12:30 pm	at Virginia*	No. 2	Scott Stadium; Charlottesville, VA	ABC/ESPN2	W 59–10	58,502
September 14	12:30 pm	Tennessee*	No. 2	Autzen Stadium; Eugene, OR	ABC	W 59–14	57,895
September 28	7:30 pm	California	No. 2	Autzen Stadium; Eugene, OR	P12N	W 55–16	56,987
October 5	3:00 pm	at Colorado	No. 2	Folsom Field; Boulder, CO	P12N	W 57–16	45,944
October 12	1:00 pm	at No. 16 Washington	No. 2	Husky Stadium; Seattle, WA (rivalry, College GameDay)	FS1	W 45–24	71,833
October 19	7:00 pm	Washington State^{†}	No. 2	Autzen Stadium; Eugene, OR	FS1	W 62–38	56,949
October 26	4:00 pm	No. 12 UCLA	No. 2	Autzen Stadium; Eugene, OR (College GameDay)	ESPN	W 42–14	59,206
November 7	6:00 pm	at No. 6 Stanford	No. 2	Stanford Stadium; Stanford, CA (rivalry)	ESPN	L 20–26	51,545
November 16	1:00 pm	Utah	No. 6	Autzen Stadium; Eugene, OR	FS1	W 44–21	56,481
November 23	12:30 pm	at Arizona	No. 5	Arizona Stadium; Tucson, AZ	ABC/ESPN2	L 16–42	45,777
November 29	4:00 pm	Oregon State	No. 12	Autzen Stadium; Eugene, OR (Civil War)	FS1	W 36–35	58,330
December 30	3:45 pm	vs. Texas*	No. 10	Alamodome; San Antonio, TX (Alamo Bowl)	ESPN	W 30–7	65,918
*Non-conference game; ^{†}Homecoming; Rankings from AP Poll released prior to the game; All times are in Pacific time

== Personnel ==
=== Coaching staff ===
Name	Position	Seasons at Oregon	Alma mater	Previous Coaching Position
Mark Helfrich	Head coach	5 (1 as HC)	Southern Oregon (1996)	OC & QB – Oregon
Nick Aliotti	Defensive coordinator	22 (17 as DC)	UCDavis (1976)	Incumbent
Scott Frost	Offensive coordinator & quarterbacks	5 (1 as OC)	Nebraska (1997)	WR – Oregon
Steve Greatwood	Running game coordinator & offensive line	27	Oregon (1980)	Incumbent
Matt Lubick	Passing Game Coordinator & wide receivers	1	Colorado State (1995)	WR – Duke
Gary Campbell	Running backs	31	UCLA (1973)	Incumbent
Tom Osbourne	Tight ends & special teams	13	Washington State (1983)	Incumbent
Don Pellum	Linebackers & recruiting coordinator	21	Oregon (1985)	Incumbent
Ron Aiken	Defensive line	1	North Carolina A&T (1977)	DL – Arizona Cardinals
John Neal	Secondary	11	BYU (1980)	Incumbent
Jim Radcliffe	Strength and conditioning	29	Pacific University (1980)	Incumbent

=== Roster ===
2013 Oregon Ducks Football
Quarterback: 3 Jake Rodrigues – (redshirt) Freshman; 8 Marcus Mariota – (redshirt) Sophomore; 10 Damion Hobbs – Freshman; 12 Taylor Alie – Freshman; 14 Dustin Haines – Senior; 17 Jeff Lockie – (redshirt) Freshman; Running back: 6 De'Anthony Thomas – Junior; 9 Byron Marshall – Sophomore; 24 Thomas Tyner – Freshman; 30 Ayele Forde – Junior; 31 Kenny Bassett – Junior; 34 Lane Roseberry – (redshirt) Freshman; 36 Kani Benoit – Freshman; 37 J.J. Jones – Freshman; 37 Jordan Thompson – Senior; Offensive lineman: 54 Hamani Stevens – Junior; 55 Hroniss Grasu – Junior; 57 Doug Brenner – Freshman; 58 James Euscher – (redshirt) Sophomore; 61 Brigham Stoehr – Freshman; 62 Matt Pierson – (redshirt) Sophomore; 63 Mana Greig – Senior; 64 Tyler Johnstone – (redshirt) Sophomore; 65 Brian Teague – Senior; 68 Jamal Prater – (redshirt) Sophomore; 69 Brandon Thomas – Sophomore; 70 Matthew McFadden – (redshirt) Freshman; 71 Everett Benyard – Senior; 72 Andre Yruretagoyena – (redshirt) Sophomore; 74 Elijah George – Freshman; 75 Jake Fisher – Junior; 76 Jake Pisarcik – Freshman; 77 Cameron Hunt – Freshman; 78 Karrington Armstrong – Senior; 79 Evan Voellet – Freshman	Wide receiver: 1 Josh Huff – Senior; 7 Keanon Lowe – Junior; 11 Bralon Addison – Sophomore; 13 Devon Allen – Freshman; 16 Daryle Hawkins – Senior; 18 Dwayne Stanford – Sophomore; 19 Eric Dungy – Junior; 20 Chance Allen – (redshirt) Freshman; 23 B.J. Kelley – (redshirt) Sophomore; 41 Blake Stanton – Junior; 84 Chad Delaney – Senior; 86 Austian Diach – (redshirt) Freshman; 87 Darren Carrington – Freshman; 88 Jeff Stolzenburg – Junior; 89 Chris Tewhill – (redshirt) Freshman; Tight end: 32 Evan Baylis – (redshirt) Freshman; 39 Jimmy Musgrave – (redshirt) Sophomore; 80 Koa Ka'ai – (redshirt) Sophomore; 82 Davaysia Hagger – Freshman; 83 Johnny Mundt – Freshman; 85 Pharaoh Brown – Sophomore	Defensive lineman: 9 Arik Armstead – Sophomore; 42 Cody Carriger – (redshirt) Freshman; 44 DeForest Buckner – Sophomore; 56 Alex Balducci – Sophomore; 84 Stetzon Bair – (redshirt) Sophomore; 93 Jason Sloan – Freshman; 99 Sam Kamp – (redshirt) Sophomore; Defensive tackle: 50 Ryan Hagen – Senior; 66 Taylor Hart – Senior; 90 Ricky Havili-Heimuli – Senior; 92 Wade Keliikipi – Senior; Defensive end: 45 T.J. Daniel – Sophomore; 57 Ryan McCandless – Sophomore; 91 Tony Washington – Junior; 96 Christian French – (redshirt) Sophomore; 98 David Kafovalu – Junior; Linebacker: 19 Tyrell Robinson – Freshman; 22 Derrick Malone – Junior; 25 Boseko Lokombo – Senior; 33 Tyson Coleman – (redshirt) Sophomore; 34 Rahim Cassell – (redshirt) Sophomore; 35 Joe Walker – Sophomore; 38 Mike Garrity – Junior; 40 Brett Bafaro – (redshirt) Freshman; 46 Danny Mattingly – Freshman; 47 Oshay Dunmore – (redshirt) Freshman; 48 Rodney Hardrick – Junior; 51 Isaac Ava – Junior; 52 Ivan Faulhaber – Freshman; 59 Grant Thompson – Junior; 86 Torrodney Prevot – Freshman	Defensive back: 2 Tyree Robinson – Freshman; 5 Issac Dixon – (redshirt) Sophomore; 8 Reggie Daniels – (redshirt) Freshman; 10 Chris Seisay – Freshman; 12 Brian Jackson – Senior; 13 Troy Hill – Junior; 17 Juwaan Williams – Freshman; 26 Ben Butterfield – Senior; 27 Terrance Mitchell – Junior; 28 Eric Amoako – (redshirt) Freshman; 29 Stephen Amoako – (redshirt) Freshman; 32 Bobby Dunn – Sophomore; 37 Michael Manns – (redshirt) Freshman; 43 Bronson Yim – (redshirt) Sophomore; Cornerback: 3 Dior Mathis – Junior; 14 Ifo Ekpre-Olomu – Junior; 21 Avery Patterson – Senior; Free Safety: 4 Erick Dargan – Junior	Long snapper: 39 Drew Howell – Senior; 53 Connor Johnson – Freshman; Punter: 38 Ian Wheeler – Freshman; Placekicker: 30 Dylan Ausherman – (redshirt) Junior; 41 Alejandro Maldonado – Senior; 48 Eric Solis – (redshirt) Junior; 49 Matt Wogan – Freshman; 97 Hayden Crook – (redshirt) Freshman

=== Depth chart ===
Defense

FS
Avery Patterson
Eric Dargan

DE/OLB	ILB	ILB	SLB
Tony Washington	Derrick Malone	Rodney Hardrick	⋅
Christian French	Joe Walker	Rahim Cassell	⋅

SS
Brian Jackson
Reggie Daniels

CB
Ifo Ekpre-Olomu
Troy Hill

DE	NT	DE
Wade Keli'ikipi	Arik Armstead	Taylor Hart
Alex Balducci	Ricky Havili-Heimuli	DeForest Buckner

CB
Terrence Mitchell
Dior Mathis

Offense

WR
Josh Huff
Eric Dungy

WR
Bralon Addison
Daryle Hawkins

LT	LG	C	RG	RT
Tyler Johnstone	Mana Greig	Hroniss Grasu	Hamani Stevens	Jake Fisher
Matt Pierson	Andre Yruretagoyena	Karrington Armstong	Everett Benyard III	Cameron Hunt

TE
Johnny Mundt
Pharaoh Brown

WR
Keanon Lowe
B.J Kelley

QB
Marcus Mariota
Jeff Lockie

RB
De'Anthony Thomas
Byron Marshall

Special teams
PK Matt Wogan
PK Alejandro Maldonado
P Alejandro Maldonado
P Dylan Ausherman
KR De'Anthony Thomas
PR Bralon Addison
LS Drew Howell
H Dustin Haines

== Game summaries ==
=== Nicholls State ===
Nicholls State at #3 Oregon – Game summary

Quarter	1	2	3	4	Total
Nicholls State	0	3	0	0	3
#3 Oregon	24	14	7	21	66

at Autzen Stadium • Eugene, Oregon

- Date: August 31st, 2013
- Game time: 1:05 p.m. PST
- Game weather: Temperature: 80 °F (27 °C) • Wind: Calm • Weather: Sunny
- Game attendance: 57,769
- Referee: Jack Wood • Umpire: Ro Meisenheimer • Linesman: Mark Duddy • Line judge: Jeff Robinson • Back judge: John Jenkins • Field judge: John Morton • Side judge: Shane Anderson
- TV announcers (Fox Sports 1): Justin Kutcher, James Bates & Brady Poppinga
- http://pac-12.com/content/football-statistics

Game information

First quarter

- ORE – De'Anthony Thomas 4-yard run (Alejandro Maldonado kick)
- ORE – Bralon Addison 27-yard pass from Marcus Mariota (Matt Wogan kick)
- ORE – Thomas 22-yard run (Maldonado kick)
- ORE – Maldonado 29-yard field goal

Second quarter

- NICH – Andrew Dolan 35-yard field goal
- ORE – Mariota 12-yard run (Wogan kick)
- ORE – Mariota 46-yard run (Maldonado kick)

Third quarter

- ORE – Byron Marshall 49-yard run (Maldonado kick)

Fourth quarter

- ORE – Colt Lyerla 3-yard run (Wogan kick); Jeff Lockie 8-yard run (Maldonado kick)
- ORE – Chance Allen 23-yard pass from Jake Rodrigues (Maldonado kick)
- Oregon and Nicholls State have never played one another previously, this game begins the series.

Top passers

- NICH – Kale Henderson, 21–40, 214 yards
- ORE – Marcus Mariota, 12–21, 234 yards, 1 TD

Top rushers

- NICH – Kale Henderson, 16 attempts, 46 yards
- ORE – De'Anthony Thomas, 18 attempts, 129 yards, 2 TD

Top receiving

- NICH – Mar Washington, 11 receptions, 92 yards
- ORE – Josh Huff, 5 receptions, 118 yards

Top tackler

- NICH – Davin Bovie, 8 total, 5 solo
- ORE – Derrick Malone, 11 total, 6 solo

=== Virginia ===
#2 Oregon at Virginia – Game summary

Quarter	1	2	3	4	Total
#2 Oregon	21	7	17	14	59
Virginia	7	3	0	0	10

at Scott Stadium • Charlottesville, Virginia

- Date: September 7th, 2013
- Game time: 12:35 p.m. PST
- Game weather: Temperature: 79 °F (26 °C) • Wind S 6 mph (9.7 km/h) • Weather: Mostly sunny
- Game attendance: 58,502
- Referee: Shawn Hochuli • Umpire: Tim Schroeder • Linesman: Jim Wharrie • Line judge: Darryl Johnson • Back judge: James Settle • Field judge: Mike McCabe • Side judge: Brad Judge
- TV announcers (ABC/ESPN2): Mike Patrick, Ed Cunningham & Jeannine Edwards
- http://pac-12.com/content/football-statistics

Game information

First quarter

- ORE – Marcus Mariota 71-yard run (Dustin Haines run for two-point conversion)
- ORE – De'Anthony Thomas 1-yard run (kick blocked)
- ORE – Thomas 40-yard run (Alejandro Maldonado kick)
- UVA – Khalek Shepherd 45-yard run (Ian Frye kick)

Second quarter

- ORE – Bralon Addision 30-yard pass from Mariota (Matt Wogan kick)
- UVA – Frye 37-yard field goal

Third quarter

- ORE – Maldonado 29-yard field goal
- ORE – Thomas 8-yard run (Maldonado kick)
- ORE – Keanon Lowe 11-yard pass from Mariota (Wogan kick)

Fourth quarter

- ORE – Thomas Tyner 3-yard run (Maldonado kick)
- ORE – Tyner 31-yard run (Wogan kick)
- Oregon and Virginia have never played one another previously, this game begins the series.

Top passers

- ORE – Marcus Mariota, 14–28, 199 yards, 2 TD
- UVA – David Watford, 29–41, 161 yards, 3 INT

Top rushers

- ORE – De'Anthony Thomas, 11 attempts, 124 yards, 3 TD
- UVA – Kevin Parks, 19 attempts, 60 yards

Top receiving

- ORE – Josh Huff, 3 receptions, 55 yards
- UVA – Jake McGee, 8 receptions, 53 yards

Top tackler

- ORE – Derrick Malone, 12 tackles, 3 solo, 0.5 TFL
- UVA – Daquan Romero, 8 tackles, 5 solo, 1 pass defended

=== Tennessee ===
Tennessee at #2 Oregon – Game summary

Quarter	1	2	3	4	Total
Tennessee	7	0	0	7	14
#2 Oregon	10	28	21	0	59

at Autzen Stadium • Eugene, Oregon

- Date: September 14th, 2013
- Game time: 12:36 p.m. PST
- Game weather: Temperature: 64 °F (18 °C) • Wind: Calm • Weather: Overcast
- Game attendance: 57,895
- Referee: Land Clark • Umpire: Matt Jordan • Linesman: Bart Longson • Line judge: Rich Troyer • Back judge: Chris Coyte • Field judge: Mich Mothershed • Side judge: Bernie Hulscher
- TV announcers (ABC): Mike Patrick, Ed Cunningham & Jeannine Edwards
- http://pac-12.com/content/football-statistics

Game information

First quarter

- TENN – Jason Croom 4-yard pass from Justin Worley (Michael Palardy kick)
- ORE – Matt Wogan 38-yard field goal
- ORE – John Mundt 16-yard pass from Marcus Mariota (Alejandro Maldonado kick)

Second quarter

- ORE – Mariota 9-yard run (Wogan kick)
- ORE – Josh Huff 54-yard pass from Mariota (Maldonado kick)
- ORE – Daryle Hawkins 45-yard pass from Mariota (Wogan kick)
- ORE – De'Anthony Thomas 28-yard run (Maldonado kick)

Third quarter

- ORE – Mundt 17-yard pass from Mariota (Wogan kick)
- ORE – Byron Marshall 11-yard run (Maldonado kick)
- ORE – Thomas Tyner 2-yard run (Wogan kick)

Fourth quarter

- TENN – Alden Hill 8-yard run (Palardy kick)
- Oregon leads the series with Tennessee 1–0 (1.000). The series began in 2010 at Tennessee, Oregon 48, Tennessee 13.

Top passers

- TENN – Justin Worley, 13–25, 126 yards, 1 TD
- ORE – Marcus Mariota, 23–33, 456 yards, 4 TD

Top rushers

- TENN – Marlin Lane, 13 attempts, 63 yards
- ORE – De'Anthony Thomas, 13 attempts, 86 yards, 1 TD

Top receiving

- TENN – Rajion Neal, 4 receptions, 23 yards
- ORE – Josh Huff, 6 receptions, 125 yards, 1 TD

Top tackler

- TENN – A.J. Johnson, 7 total, 2 solo
- ORE – Brian Jackson, 6 total, 3 solo

=== California ===
California at #2 Oregon – Game summary

Quarter	1	2	3	4	Total
California	0	3	7	6	16
#2 Oregon	27	14	14	0	55

at Autzen Stadium • Eugene, Oregon

- Date: September 28th, 2013
- Game time: 7:37 p.m. PST
- Game weather: Temperature: 62 °F (17 °C) • Wind S 25 mph (40 km/h) • Weather: Rain
- Game attendance: 56,987
- Referee: Jack Folliard • Umpire: Douglas Wilson • Linesman: Dan Antonietti • Line judge: Steven Kovac • Back judge: Steve Steichen • Field judge: Kevin Kieser • Side judge: Mearl Robinson
- TV announcers (Pac-12 Network): Ted Robinson, Glenn Parker & Drea Avent
- http://pac-12.com/content/football-statistics

Game information

First quarter

- ORE – Byron Marshall 14-yard run (PAT failed)
- ORE – Josh Huff 19-yard pass from Marcus Mariota (Matt Wogan kick)
- ORE – Daryle Hawkins 14-yard pass from Mariota (Alejandro Maldonado kick)
- ORE – Marshall 25-yard run (Wogan kick)

Second quarter

- ORE – Mariota 2-yard run (Maldonado kick)
- ORE – Bralon Addision 75-yard punt return (Wogan kick)
- CAL – Vincenzo D'Amato 46-yard field goal

Third quarter

- ORE – Addison 67-yard punt return (Maldonado kick)
- ORE – Thomas Tyner 21-yard run (Wogan kick)
- CAL – Jeffrey Coprich 1-yard run (D'Amato kick)

Fourth quarter

- CAL – James Grisom 7-yard pass from Zach Kline (PAT failed)
- California leads the series with Oregon 39–34–2 (.533). The series began in 1899 at California, California 12, Oregon 0. The last meeting was the 2012 game at California, Oregon 59, California 17.

Top passers

- CAL – Zach Kline, 18–37, 165 yards, 1 TD, 1 INT
- ORE – Marcus Mariota, 11–25, 114 yards, 2 TD

Top rushers

- CAL – Brendan Bigelow, 18 attempts, 61 yards
- ORE – Byron Marshall, 19 attempts, 130 yards, 2 TD

Top receiving

- CAL – Daniel Lasco, 5 receptions, 35 yards
- ORE – Bralon Addison, 3 receptions, 13 yards

Top tackler

- CAL – Deandre Coleman, 8 total, 3 solo, 1 TFL
- ORE – Joe Walker, 9 total, 6 solo, 1 TFL

=== Colorado ===
#2 Oregon at Colorado – Game summary

Quarter	1	2	3	4	Total
#2 Oregon	29	14	14	0	57
Colorado	10	6	0	0	16

at Folsom Field • Boulder, Colorado

- Date: October 5th, 2013
- Game time: 3:07 p.m. PST
- Game weather: Temperature: 61 °F (16 °C) • Wind NW 8 mph (13 km/h) • Weather: Sunny
- Game attendance: 45,944
- Referee: Michael Batlan • Umpire: Rick DiBernardo • Linesman: Edwin Walker • Line judge: Tim Messuri • Back judge: Joe Johnston • Field judge: Jeffrey Yock • Side judge: Mike Weselch
- TV announcers (Pac-12 Network): Ted Robinson, Glenn Parker & Drea Avent
- http://pac-12.com/content/football-statistics

Game information

First quarter

- COLO – Will Oliver 33-yard field goal
- ORE – Marcus Mariota 2-yard run (Pharoah Brown run for two-point conversion)
- COLO – D.D. Goodson 75-yard pass from Paul Richardson (Oliver kick)
- ORE – Thomas Tyner 2-yard run (Alejandro Maldonado kick)
- ORE – Bralon Addison 75-yard pass from Mariota (Maldonado kick)
- ORE – Keanon Lowe 17-yard pass from Mariota (Wogan kick)

Second quarter

- COLO – Oliver 22-yard field goal
- COL – Oliver 31-yard field goal
- ORE – Mariota 1-yard run (Maldonado kick)
- ORE – Josh Huff 4-yard pass from Mariota (Wogan kick)

Third quarter

- ORE – Addison 44-yard pass from Mariota (Maldonado kick)
- ORE – Huff 26-yard pass from Mariota (Wogan kick)
- Oregon leads the series with Colorado 9–8 (.529). The series began in 1949 at Oregon, Oregon 42, Colorado 14. The last meeting was the 2012 game at Oregon, Oregon 70, Colorado 14.

Top passers

- ORE – Marcus Mariota, 16–27, 355 yards, 5 TD
- COLO – Connor Wood, 11–33, 205 yards, 2 INT

Top rushers

- ORE – Byron Marshall, 23 attempts, 122 yards
- COLO – Christian Powell, 20 attempts, 78 yards

Top receiving

- ORE – Bralon Addison, 5 receptions, 158 yards, 2 TD
- COLO – Paul Richardson, 5 receptions, 134 yards

Top tackler

- ORE – Ifo Ekpre-Olomu, 8 total, 7 solo, 1 TFL
- COLO – Gillam Addison, 15 total, 15 solo, 2 TFL, 1 sack

=== Washington ===
#2 Oregon at #16 Washington – Game summary

Quarter	1	2	3	4	Total
#2 Oregon	7	14	10	14	45
#16 Washington	7	0	17	0	24

at Husky Stadium • Seattle

- Date: October 12th, 2013
- Game time: 1:05 p.m. PST
- Game weather: Temperature: 54 °F (12 °C) • Wind N 5 mph (8.0 km/h) • Weather: Cloudy
- Game attendance: 71,833
- Referee: Jack Wood • Umpire: Ro Meisenheimer • Linesman: Mark Duddy • Line judge: Jeff Robinson • Back judge: John Jenkins • Field judge: John Morton • Side judge: Shane Anderson
- TV announcers (Fox Sports 1): Gus Johnson, Charles Davis & Kristina Pink
- http://pac-12.com/content/football-statistics

Game information

First quarter

- ORE – Byron Marshall 1-yard run (Alejandro Maldonado kick)
- WASH – Austin Seferian-Jenkins 8-yard pass from Keith Price (Travis Coons kick)

Second quarter

- ORE – Bralon Addison 4-yard pass from Marcus Mariota (Matt Wogan kick)
- ORE – Marshall 15-yard run (Maldonado kick)

Third quarter

- WASH – Bishop Sankey 60-yard run (Coons kick)
- ORE – Josh Huff 65-yard pass from Mariota (Wogan kick)
- WASH – Coons 30-yard field goal
- ORE – Maldonado 34-yard field goal
- WASH – Sankey 25-yard run (Coons kick)

Fourth quarter

- ORE – Mariota 5-yard run (Maldonado kick)
- ORE – Addison 3-yard pass from Mariota (Wogan kick)
- Washington leads the series with Oregon 58–43–5 (.571). The series began in 1900 at Oregon, Oregon 43, Washington 0; the last meeting was the 2012 game at Washington, Oregon 52, Washington 21.

- Winning this game continued the Duck's streak of wins over their Northwest Rivals to 10 consecutive years, winning in each of those years by at least 17 points. It is the longest win streak by either team in the rivalry.

Top passers

- ORE – Marcus Mariota, 24–31, 366 yards, 3 TD
- WASH – Keith Price, 19–32, 182 yards, 1 TD, 1 INT

Top rushers

- ORE – Byron Marshall, 19 attempts, 106 yards, 2 TD
- WASH – Bishop Sankey, 28 attempts, 167 yards, 2 TD

Top receiving

- ORE – Bralon Addison, 8 receptions, 157 yards, 2 TD
- WASH – Bishop Sankey, 5 receptions, 38 yards

Top tackler

- ORE – Derrick Malone, 10 total, 4 solo, 1 TFL, 1 sack
- WASH – Timu Johnson, 10 total, 6 solo, 2 TFL, 1 sack

=== Washington State ===
Washington State at #2 Oregon – Game summary

Quarter	1	2	3	4	Total
Washington State	7	17	0	14	38
#2 Oregon	20	14	14	14	62

at Autzen Stadium • Eugene, Oregon

- Date: October 19th, 2013
- Game time: 7:05 p.m. PST
- Game weather: Temperature: 63 °F (17 °C) • Wind N 3 mph (4.8 km/h) • Weather: Clear
- Game attendance: 56,949
- Referee: Jay Stricherz • Umpire: Matt Richards • Linesman: Cappy Anderson• Line judge: Randy Campbell • Back judge: Brad Robinson • Field judge: Mike McCabe • Side judge: Clay Reynard
- TV announcers (Fox Sports 1): Justin Kutcher, James Bates & Brady Poppinga
- http://pac-12.com/content/football-statistics

Game information

First quarter

- ORE – Marcus Mariota 54-yard run (2-point conversion attempt failed)
- ORE – Byron Marshall 1-yard run (Matt Wogan kick)
- WSU – Dom Williams 11-yard pass from Connor Halliday (Andrew Furney Kick)
- ORE – Marshall 26-yard run (Alejandro Maldonado kick)

Second quarter

- ORE – Thomas Tyner 1-yard run (Wogan kick)
- WSU – River Cracraft 12-yard pass from Halliday (Furney kick)
- WSU – Xavier Cooper 29-yard pass from Halliday (Furney kick)
- ORE – Tyner 66-yard run (Maldonado kick)
- WSU – Furney 49-yard Field Goal

Third quarter

- ORE – Keanon Low 10-yard pass from Mariota (Wogan kick)
- ORE – Marshall 30-yard run (Maldonado kick)

Fourth quarter

- ORE – Josh Huff 17-yard pass from Mariota (Wogan kick)
- ORE – Terrance Mitchell 51-yard interception return (Maldonado kick)
- WSU – Gabe Marks 8-yard pass from Halliday (Furney kick)
- WSU – Bobby Ratliff 3-yard pass from Halliday (Furney kick)
- Oregon leads the series with Washington State 47–36–7 (.561). The series began in 1901 at Washington State, Washington State 16, Oregon 0; the last meeting was the 2012 game at Washington State, Oregon 51, Washington State 26.

Top passers

- WSU – Connor Halliday, 58–89, 557 yards, 4 TD, 4 INT
- ORE – Marcus Mariota, 23–32, 327 yards, 2 TD

Top rushers

- WSU – Marcus Mason, 4 attempts, 15 yards
- ORE – Byron Marshall, 21 attempts, 192 yards, 3 TD

Top receiving

- WSU – Gabe Marks, 13 receptions, 143 yards, 1 TD
- ORE – Josh Huff, 5 receptions, 75 yards, 1 TD

Top tackler

- WSU – Daquawn Brown, 10 total, 8 solo
- ORE – Avery Patterson, 8 total, 4 solo, 1 INT, 2 passes defended

=== UCLA ===
#12 UCLA at #2 Oregon – Game summary

Quarter	1	2	3	4	Total
#12 UCLA	7	7	0	0	14
#2 Oregon	7	7	7	21	42

at Autzen Stadium • Eugene, Oregon

- Date: October 26th, 2013
- Game time: 4:06 p.m. PST
- Game weather: Temperature: 51 °F (11 °C) • Wind N 5 mph (8.0 km/h) • Weather: Cloudy
- Game attendance: 59,206
- Referee: Land Clark • Umpire: Matt Jordan • Linesman: Bart Longson • Line judge: Rich Troyer • Back judge: Chris Coyte • Field judge: Mich Mothershed • Side judge: Bernie Hulscher
- TV announcers (ESPN): Brent Musburger, Kirk Herbstreit & Heather Cox
- http://pac-12.com/content/football-statistics

Game information

First quarter

- UCLA – Brett Hundley 4-yard run (Ka'imi Fairbairn kick)
- ORE – De'Anthony Thomas 1-yard run (Alejandro Maldonado kick)

Second quarter

- ORE – Byron Marshall 40-yard run (Matt Wogan kick)
- UCLA – Thomas Duarte 11-yard pass from Brett Hundley (Fairbairn kick)

Third quarter

- ORE – Marshall 11-yard run (Maldonado kick)

Fourth quarter

- ORE – Bralon Addison 8-yard pass from Marcus Mariota (Maldonado kick)
- ORE – Marshall 3-yard run (Maldonado kick)
- ORE – Thomas Tyner 2-yard run (Wogan kick)
- UCLA leads the series with Oregon 39–26 (.600). The series began in 1928 at UCLA, Oregon 26, UCLA 6; the last meeting was the 2011 Pac-12 Championship game at Oregon, Oregon 49, UCLA 31.

Top passers

- UCLA – Brett Hundley, 13–19, 64 yards, 1 TD, 2 INT
- ORE – Marcus Mariota, 21–28, 230 yards, 1 TD

Top rushers

- UCLA – Paul Perkins, 22 attempts, 93 yards
- ORE – Byron Marshall, 19 attempts, 133 yards, 3 TD

Top receiving

- UCLA – Devin Fuller, 4 receptions, 18 yards
- ORE – Josh Huff, 6 receptions, 76 yards

Top tackler

- UCLA – Jordan Zumwalt, 14 total, 10 solo, 2 TFL
- ORE – Derrick Malone, 10 total, 7 solo

=== Stanford ===
#2 Oregon at #6 Stanford – Game summary

Quarter	1	2	3	4	Total
#2 Oregon	0	0	0	20	20
#6 Stanford	7	10	6	3	26

at Stanford Stadium • Stanford, California

- Date: November 4th, 2013
- Game time: 6:01 p.m. PST
- Game weather: Temperature: 72 °F (22 °C) • Wind 6 mph (9.7 km/h) • Weather: Clear
- Game attendance: 51,424
- Referee: Jay Stricherz • Umpire: Matt Richards • Linesman: Cappy Anderson• Line judge: Randy Campbell • Back judge: Brad Robinson • Field judge: Mike McCabe • Side judge: Clay Reynard
- TV announcers (ESPN): Rece Davis, Jesse Palmer, David Pollack & Samantha Ponder
- http://pac-12.com/content/football-statistics

Game information

First quarter

- STAN – Tyler Gaffney 2-yard run (Jordan Williamson kick)

Second quarter

- STAN – Kevin Hogan 11-yard run (Williamson kick)
- STAN – Williamson 19-yard field goal

Third quarter

- STAN – Williamson 34-yard field goal
- STAN – Williamson 26-yard field goal

Fourth quarter

- STAN – Williamson 30-yard field goal
- ORE – Daryle Hawkins 23-yard pass from Marcus Mariota (Matt Wogan kick)
- ORE – Rodney Hardrick 65-yard blocked field goal return (two-point conversion failed)
- ORE – Pharaoh Brown 12-yard pass from Mariota (Wogan kick)
- Stanford leads the series with Oregon 45–30–1 (.599). The series began in 1900 at Stanford, Stanford 34, Oregon 0; the last meeting was the 2012 game at Oregon, Stanford 17, Oregon 14 (OT).

Top passers

- ORE – Marcus Mariota, 20–34, 250 yards, 2 TD
- STAN – Kevin Hogan, 7–13, 103 yards

Top rushers

- ORE – Byron Marshall, 11 attempts, 46 yards
- STAN – Tyler Gaffney, 45 attempts, 157 yards, 1 TD

Top receiving

- ORE – Bralon Addison, 5 receptions, 66 yards
- STAN – Ty Montgomery, 2 receptions, 20 yards

Top tackler

- ORE – Brian Jackson, 14 total, 6 solo
- STAN – Shayne Skov, 9 total, 5 solo, 2 TFL, 1 forced fumble, 1 pass defended

=== Utah ===
Utah at #6 Oregon – Game summary

Quarter	1	2	3	4	Total
Utah	0	7	7	7	21
#6 Oregon	10	7	20	7	44

at Autzen Stadium • Eugene, Oregon

- Date: November 16th, 2013
- Game time: 12:05 p.m. PST
- Game weather: Temperature: 50 °F (10 °C) • Wind W 10 mph (16 km/h) • Weather: Cloudy
- Game attendance: 56,481
- Referee: Shawn Hochuli • Umpire: Tim Schroeder • Linesman: Jim Wharrie • Line judge: Darryl Johnson • Back judge: James Settle • Field judge: Mike McCabe • Side judge: Brad Judge
- TV announcers (Fox Sports 1): Justin Kutcher, James Bates & Brady Poppinga
- http://pac-12.com/content/football-statistics

Game information

First quarter

- ORE – De'Anthony Thomas 8-yard pass from Marcus Mariota (Matt Wogan kick)
- ORE – Wogan 31-yard field goal

Second quarter

- UTAH – Jake Murphy 34-yard pass from Adam Schulz (Andy Phillips kick)
- ORE – Josh Huff 5-yard pass from Mariota (Wogan kick)

Third quarter

- UTAH – Schulz 4-yard run (Phillips kick)
- ORE – Thomas 86-yard kick return (Wogan kick missed)
- ORE – John Mundt 14-yard pass from Mariota (Wogan kick)
- ORE – Byron Marshall 17-yard run (Wogan kick)

Fourth quarter

- ORE – Marshall 16-yard run (Wogan kick)
- UTAH – Bubba Poole 10-yard run (Phillips kick)
- Oregon leads the series with Utah 18–8 (.692). The series began in 1933 at Oregon, Oregon 23, Utah 7. The last meeting was the 2009 game at Oregon, Oregon 31, Utah 24.

- Following Oregon's win against Utah, in other Pac-12 play, the USC Trojans beat the Stanford Cardinal in Los Angeles, thereby putting Oregon back into first place in the Pac-12 North Division.

Top passers

- UTAH – Adam Schulz, 13–30, 181 yards, 1 TD, 1 INT
- ORE – Marcus Mariota, 19–26, 288 yards, 3 TD

Top rushers

- UTAH – Bubba Poole, 18 attempts, 54 yards, 1 TD
- ORE – Byron Marshall, 11 attempts, 66 yards, 2 TD

Top receiving

- UTAH – Dres Anderson, 4 receptions, 37 yards
- ORE – Bralon Addison, 4 receptions, 67 yards

Top tackler

- UTAH – Eric Rowe, 9 total, 3 solo, 0.5 TFL, 0.5 sack
- ORE – Avery Patterson, 7 total, 6 solo

=== Arizona ===
#5 Oregon at Arizona – Game summary

Quarter	1	2	3	4	Total
#5 Oregon	3	6	0	7	16
Arizona	14	14	7	7	42

at Arizona Stadium • Tucson, Arizona

- Date: November 23rd, 2013
- Game time: 12:37 p.m. PST
- Game weather: Temperature: 50 °F (10 °C) • Wind ENE 12 mph (19 km/h) • Weather: Overcast, rain
- Game attendance: 45,777
- Referee: Land Clark • Umpire: Matt Jordan • Linesman: Bart Longson • Line judge: Rich Troyer • Back judge: Chris Coyte • Field judge: Mich Mothershed • Side judge: Bernie Hulscher
- TV announcers (ABC/ESPN2): Mike Patrick, Ed Cunningham & Jeannine Edwards
- http://pac-12.com/content/football-statistics

Game information

First quarter

- ARI – Ka'Deem Carey 6-yard run (Jake Smith kick)
- ARI – Nate Phillips 9-yard pass from B.J. Denker (Smith kick)
- ORE – Matt Wogan 33-yard field goal

Second quarter

- ARI – Terrence Miller 5-yard pass from Denker (Smith kick)
- ORE – Pharoah Brown 1-yard pass from Marcus Mariota (2-point conversion attempt failed)
- ARI – Carey 1-yard run (Smith kick)

Third quarter

- ARI – Carey 9-yard run (Smith kick)

Fourth quarter

- ORE – Josh Huff 2-yard pass from Mariota (Wogan kick)
- ARI – Carey 1-yard run
- Oregon leads the series with Arizona 24–14 (.632). The series began in 1937 at Arizona, Arizona 20, Oregon 6. The last meeting was the 2012 game at Oregon, Oregon 49, Arizona 0.

- In this game, Oregon starting quarterback Marcus Mariota ended his streak of consecutive passes thrown without an interception at 353 consecutive passes, dating back to the 2012 Stanford game. In total he threw two interceptions against Arizona, the first on the first offensive play of the game and the second late in the fourth quarter.

Top passers

- ORE – Marcus Mariota, 27–41, 308 yards, 2 TD, 2 INT
- ARI – B.J. Denker, 19–22, 178 yards, 2 TD

Top rushers

- ORE – De'Anthony Thomas, 16 attempts, 83 yards
- ARI – Ka'Deem Carey, 48 attempts, 206 yards, 4 TD

Top receiving

- ORE – De'Anthony Thomas 6 receptions, 74 yards
- ARI – Terrence Miller, 9 receptions, 88 yards, 1 TD

Top tackler

- ORE – Derrick Malone, 12 total, 2 solo
- ARI – Jake Fischer, 14 total, 8 solo, 1 TFL

=== Oregon State – 117th Civil War ===
Oregon State at #10 Oregon – Game summary

Quarter	1	2	3	4	Total
Oregon State	0	17	3	15	35
#12 Oregon	14	3	7	12	36

at Autzen Stadium • Eugene, Oregon

- Date: November 29th, 2013
- Game time: 4:07 p.m. PST
- Game weather: Temperature: 47 °F (8 °C) • Wind NE 5 mph (8.0 km/h) • Weather: Cloudy
- Game attendance: 58,330
- Referee: Jack Folliard • Umpire: Douglas Wilson • Linesman: Dan Antonietti • Line judge: Steven Kovac • Back judge: Steve Steichen • Field judge: Kevin Kieser • Side judge: Mearl Robinson
- TV announcers (Fox Sports 1): Justin Kutcher, James Bates & Brady Poppinga
- http://pac-12.com/content/football-statistics

Game information

First quarter

- ORE – De'Anthony Thomas 5-yard run (Matt Wogan kick)
- ORE – Thomas Tyner 13-yard run (Wogan kick)

Second quarter

- OSU – Storm Woods 2-yard run (Trevor Romaine kick)
- ORE – Wogan 20-yard field goal
- OSU – Romaine 18-yard field goal
- OSU – Terron Ward 6-yard pass from Sean Mannion (Romaine kick)

Third quarter

- OSU – Romaine 47-yard field goal
- ORE – Josh Huff 28-yard pass from Marcus Mariota (Wogan kick)

Fourth quarter

- OSU – Romaine 37-yard field goal
- OSU – Tyler Anderson 4-yard pass from Mannion (2-point conversion attempt failed)
- ORE – Huff 12-yard pass from Mariota (2-point conversion attempt failed)
- OSU – Victor Bolden 25-yard run (2-point conversion attempt failed)
- ORE – Huff 12-yard pass from Mariota (2-point conversion attempt failed)
- Oregon leads the Civil War series with Oregon State 60–46–10 (.560). The series began in 1894 at Oregon Agricultural College, OAC 16, Oregon 0. The last meeting was the 2012 game at Oregon State, Oregon 48, Oregon State 24.
- Prior to this game, Oregon has won the Civil War for 5 consecutive years, the streak of 5 wins is tied with the 1949–1953 Beavers for 2nd longest win streak by either team in the series. The longest win streak in the series by either team is also a tie, at 8 years, between the 1975–1982 Ducks and the 1964–1971 Beavers, respectively. The longest streak without a loss by either team is 13 years by Oregon from 1975 to 1987, with 1983 being a 0–0 tie.
- With this win Oregon has achieved at least 10 wins for six consecutive years.

Top passers

- OSU – Sean Mannion, 29–47, 314 yards, 2 TD, 1 INT
- ORE – Marcus Mariota, 17–34, 285 yards, 3 TD, 2 INT

Top rushers

- OSU – Terron Ward, 17 attempts, 145 yards
- ORE – Thomas Tyner, 22 attempts, 140 yards, 1 TD

Top receiving

- OSU – Brandin Cooks, 10 receptions, 110 yards
- ORE – Josh Huff, 9 receptions, 186 yards, 3 TD

Top tackler

- OSU – D.J. Alexander, 11 total, 7 solo, 1 forced fumble
- ORE – Ifo Ekpre-Olomu, 12 total, 12 solo, 1 INT, 3 passes defended

=== Texas – Alamo Bowl ===
#10 Oregon vs. Texas – Game summary

Quarter	1	2	3	4	Total
#10 Oregon	10	10	3	7	30
Texas	7	0	0	0	7

at Alamodome • San Antonio, Texas

- Date: December 30th, 2013
- Game time: 3:51 p.m. PST
- Game weather: Indoors
- Game attendance: 65,918
- Referee: Dennis Hennigan (ACC) • Umpire: Jim Hyson • Linesman: Matt Fitzgerald • Line judge: Deon Lawerence • Back judge: Barry Hendon • Field judge: Bill Dolbow • Side judge: Mike Safrit
- TV announcers (ESPN): Brad Nessler, Todd Blackledge & Holly Rowe
- http://pac-12.com/content/football-statistics

Game information

First quarter

- ORE – Avery Patterson 37-yard interception return (Matt Wogan kick)
- ORE – Wogan 25-yard field goal
- TEX – Case McCoy 1-yard run (Anthony Fera kick)

Second quarter

- ORE – Wogan 32-yard field goal
- ORE – Josh Huff 16 yard-pass from Marcus Mariota (Wogan kick)

Third quarter

- ORE – Wogan 39-yard field goal

Fourth quarter

- ORE – Derrick Malone 38-yard interception return (Wogan kick)
- Texas leads the series with Oregon 4–1 (.800). The series began in 1941 at Texas, Texas 71, Oregon 7. The last meeting was the 2000 Holiday Bowl, Oregon 35, Texas 30.

Top passers

- ORE – Marcus Mariota, 18–26, 253 yards, 1 TD
- TEX – Case McCoy, 8–17, 48 yards, 2 INT

Top rushers

- ORE – Marcus Mariota, 15 attempts, 134 yards
- TEX – Malcolm Brown, 26 attempts, 130 yards

Top receiving

- ORE – Josh Huff, 5 receptions, 104 yards, 1 TD
- TEX – Joe Bergeron, 2 receptions, 16 yards

Top tackler

- ORE – Taylor Hart, 11 tackles, 3 solo, 1 TFL, 0.5 sacks
- TEX – Peter Jinkens, 9 tackles, 5 solo

== Rankings ==
Ranking movements Legend: ██ Increase in ranking ██ Decrease in ranking ( ) = First-place votes
	Week																
Poll	Pre	1	2	3	4	5	6	7	8	9	10	11	12	13	14	15	Final
AP	3	2	2 (1)	2 (1)	2 (4)	2 (5)	2 (5)	2 (5)	2 (3)	2 (3)	2 (2)	6	5	12	12	10	9
Coaches	3	3	2 (1)	2 (1)	2 (3)	2 (2)	2 (4)	2 (3)	2 (4)	2 (6)	2 (5)	7	5	12	12	12	9
Harris	Not released							2 (10)	2 (8)	2 (10)	2 (8)	6	5	12	12	12	Not released
BCS	Not released								3	2	3	6	5	13	12	10	Not released

== After the season ==
=== Team records broken ===
Total offense – Team

	YR	GP	YDS	AVG
New	2013 Oregon Ducks	13	7,345	565
Old	2011 Oregon Ducks	14	7,319	522.8

Total offense – Single Season

	YR	NAME	POS	PLAYS	P.YDS	Ru.YDS	TD	YDS	AVG
New	2013	Marcus Mariota	QB	482	3,665	715	40	4,380	9.1
Old	1998	Akili Smith	QB	442	3,763	184	36	3,947	8.9

Receiving Yards – Single Season

	YR	NAME	POS	REC	YDS	AVG	TD
New	2013	Josh Huff	WR	62	1,140	18.4	12
Old	1970	Bob Newland	WR	67	1,123	16.6	7

Kickoff Return Yards – Career

	YRS	NAME	POS	RTN	YDS	AVG
New	2011–2013	De'Anthony Thomas	RB	73	1,885	25.8
Old	1979–1982	Steve Brown	CB	78	1,868	23.9

=== Players drafted ===
The following Oregon players were selected in the 2014 NFL draft.

No.	Player	Class	Pos.	Round	Pick	Team
1	Josh Huff	SR	WR	3	86	Philadelphia Eagles
6	De'Anthony Thomas	JR	RB	4	124	Kansas City Chiefs
66	Taylor Hart	SR	DT	5	141	Philadelphia Eagles
27	Terrance Mitchell	JR	CB	7	254	Dallas Cowboys

=== All-Americans ===
- Hroniss Grasu, Junior, Center (SI, Athlon)
- Ifo Ekpre-Olomu, Junior, Cornerback (ESPN)

== Statistics ==
=== Team ===
Team Statistics
	Oregon	Opponents
First Downs	348	271
Rushing	171	123
Passing	164	121
Penalty	13	27
Rushing Yards	3,556	2,152
Rushing attempts	568	563
Average Per Rush	6.3	3.8
Average per game	273.5	165.5
Rushing TDs	42	17
Passing Yards	3,789	2,659
Comp–Att	256–405	271–480
Average Per Pass	9.4	5.5
Average Per Catch	14.8	9.8
Average per game	291.5	204.5
Passing TDs	32	14
Interceptions	6	17
Total offense	7,345	4,811
Average Per Play	7.5	4.6
Average per game	565.0	370.1
Kick returns: # – Yards	49 – 1,063	72 – 1,559
Punt returns: # – Yards	23 – 285	8 – 26
INT Returns: # – Yards	17 – 309	6 – 54
Fumbles Recovered – Fumbles Lost	30 – 12	22 – 12
Penalties – Yards	106 – 912	62 – 551
Punts – Average	43 – 39.1	81 – 39.6
Time of Possession per game	25:33	34:27
3rd–down conversions	69/160	93/232
4th–down conversions	15/31	13/28

Score by Quarter
	1st	2nd	3rd	4th	TOTAL
Oregon	182	138	134	137	591
Opponents	73	87	47	59	266

=== Offense ===
Passing Statistics
#	NAME	POS	CMP	ATT	YDS	CMP%	TD	INT	RAT
8	Marcus Mariota	QB	245	386	3,665	63.5	31	4	167.7
3	Jake Rodrigues	QB	3	6	67	50.0	1	1	165.5
17	Jeff Lockie	QB	8	13	57	61.5	0	1	83.0
	TOTALS		256	405	3,789	63.2	32	6	'164.9

Rushing Statistics
#	NAME	POS	CAR	YDS	LONG	TD
9	Byron Marshall	RB	168	1,038	49 (TD)	14
8	Marcus Mariota	QB	96	715	71 (TD)	9
24	Thomas Tyner	RB	115	752	66 (TD)	9
6	De'Anthony Thomas	RB	96	618	40 (TD)	8
33	Ayele Ford	RB	36	224	45	0
48	Rodney Hardrick	LB	1	66	66	0
34	Lane Roseberry	RB	15	40	12	0
3	Jake Rodrigues	QB	4	38	28	0
31	Kenny Bassett	RB	16	33	6	0
1	Josh Huff	WR	6	28	12	0
17	Jeff Lockie	QB	5	22	8 (TD)	0
11	Bralon Addison	WR	3	21	11	0
15	Colt Lyerla	TE	3	17	8	1
12	Daryle Hawkins	WR	1	2	2	0
	TOTALS		568	3,556	71	42

Receiving Statistics
#	NAME	POS	REC	YDS	LONG	TD
1	Josh Huff	WR	62	1,140	65 (TD)	12
11	Bralon Addison	WR	61	890	75 (TD)	7
16	Daryle Hawkins	WR	23	347	45 (TD)	3
6	De'Anthony Thomas	RB	22	246	28	1
7	Keanon Lowe	WR	18	233	40	3
83	Johhny Mundt	TE	16	281	57	3
24	Thomas Tyner	RB	14	134	23	0
9	Byron Marshall	RB	13	155	36	0
85	Pharoah Brown	TE	10	123	28	2
20	Chance Allen	WR	5	98	37	1
32	Evan Baylis	TE	4	71	25	0
15	Colt Lyerla	TE	2	26	13	0
84	Chad Delaney	WR	2	12	8	0
41	Blake Stanton	WR	2	11	8	0
23	B.J. Kelly	WR	1	13	13	0
	TOTALS		256	3,789	75	32

=== Defense ===
Defense Statistics
#	NAME	POS	SOLO	AST	TOT	TFL-YDS	SACKS	INT-YDS	BU	PD	QBH	FF	FR–YDS	BLK	SAF
22	Derrick Malone	LB	47	58	105	2.5 – 8	2.5 – 8	2–42	3	5	2	1	–	–	–
14	Ifo Ekpre-Olomu	CB	54	30	84	5.0 – 14	–	3–0	6	9	–	1	–	–	–
21	Avery Patterson	FS	43	37	80	6.0 – 14	–	3–89	6	9	–	–	–	–	–
66	Taylor Hart	DT	43	32	75	6.0 – 21	3.5 – 16	–	5	5	2	3	–	–	–
12	Brian Jackson	DB	37	34	71	1.0 – 1	–	–	3	3	–	–	–	–	–
48	Rodney Hardrick	LB	35	29	64	3.0 – 10	–	1–0	3	4	2	1	3–0	–	–
25	Boseko Lokombo	LB	32	31	63	7.0 – 20	3.0 – 12	1–9	1	2	7	1	1–0	–	–
91	Tony Washington	DL	33	27	60	12.0 – 50	7.5 – 36	–	–	–	4	4	1–0	–	–
27	Terrence Mitchell	CB	38	21	59	–	–	5–72	7	12	–	1	–	–	–
44	DeForest Buckner	DL	13	26	39	3.5 – 16	2.5 – 13	–	1	1	–	1	1–0	–	–
35	Joe Walker	LB	25	12	37	3.0 – 26	2.0 – 25	–	–	–	1	–	–	–	–
92	Wade Keli'ikipi	DT	12	22	34	5.0 – 24	2.0 – 15	–	–	–	–	–	1–0	1	–
34	Rahim Cassell	LB	13	19	32	2.0 – 16	1.0 – 15	–	–	–	2	1	1–6	–	–
13	Troy Hill	DB	21	8	29	0.5 – 0	–	–	4	4	–	1	–	–	–
90	Ricky Havili-Heimuli	DT	14	11	25	4.0 – 14	1.0 – 9	–	–	–	–	–	–	–	–
4	Erik Dargan	FS	12	12	24	–	–	1–0	4	5	–	1	–	–	–
33	Tyson Coleman	LB	9	12	21	0.5 – 0	–	–	–	–	–	–	–	–	–
3	Dior Mathis	CB	11	7	18	1.5 – 5	–	1–97	2	3	–	–	–	1	–
56	Alex Balducci	DL	10	8	18	–	–	–	1	1	–	–	2–0	–	–
9	Arik Armstead	DL	6	9	15	3.0 – 6	1.0 – 4	–	2	2	2	–	–	–	–
86	Torrodney Prevot	LB	8	6	14	2.5 – 23	2.5 – 23	–	2	2	1	1	1–0	–	–
96	Christian French	DE	2	8	10	1.5 – 1	–	–	–	–	–	–	–	–	–
5	Isaac Dixon	DB	7	3	10	–	–	–	–	–	–	–	–	–	–
30	Ayele Ford	RB	6	4	10	–	–	–	–	–	–	–	–	–	–
19	Eric Dungy	WR	3	6	9	–	–	–	–	–	–	–	–	–	–
47	Oshay Dunmore	LB	4	5	9	–	–	–	–	–	–	–	–	–	–
99	Sam Kemp	DL	5	4	9	–	–	–	–	–	–	–	–	–	–
26	Ben Butterfield	DB	4	4	8	–	–	–	–	–	–	–	–	–	–
51	Isaac Ava	LB	3	4	7	–	–	–	–	–	–	–	–	–	–
8	Reggie Daniels	DB	3	3	6	–	–	–	1	1	–	–	–	–	–
97	Jared Ebert	DT	1	4	5	0.5 – 1	–	–	–	–	–	–	–	–	–
59	Grant Thompson	LB	1	3	4	–	–	–	–	–	–	–	–	–	–
98	David Kofovalu	DE	3	1	4	–	–	–	1	1	–	–	–	–	–
50	Ryan Hagen	DT	–	3	3	–	–	–	–	–	–	–	–	–	–
7	Keanon Lowe	WR	2	1	3	–	–	–	–	–	–	–	–	–	–
19	Tyrell Robinson	LB	3	–	3	–	–	–	–	–	–	–	–	–	–
42	Cody Carriger	DL	2	–	2	–	–	–	–	–	–	–	–	–	–
55	Hroniss Grasu	OL	1	–	1	–	–	–	–	–	–	–	–	–	–
39	Drew Howell	LS	–	1	1	–	–	–	–	–	–	–	–	–	–
43	Bronson Yim	DB	–	1	1	–	–	–	2	2	–	–	–	–	–
84	Stetzon Bair	DL	1	–	1	–	–	–	–	–	–	–	–	–	–
38	Mike Garrity	LB	–	1	1	–	–	–	–	–	–	–	–	–	–
32	Evan Baylis	TE	1	–	1	–	–	–	–	–	–	–	–	–	–
85	Pharaoh Brown	TE	1	–	1	–	–	–	–	–	–	–	–	–	–
16	Daryle Hawkins	WR	1	–	1	–	–	–	–	–	–	–	–	–	–
8	Marcus Mariota	QB	1	–	1	–	–	–	–	–	–	–	–	–	–
6	De'Anthony Thomas	RB	1	–	1	–	–	–	–	–	–	–	–	–	–
49	Matt Wogan	PK	1	–	1	–	–	–	–	–	–	–	–	–	–
11	Bralon Addison	WR	1	–	1	–	–	–	–	–	–	–	–	–	–
1	Josh Huff	WR	–	–	–	–	–	–	–	–	–	–	–	1	–
28	Eric Amoako	DB	–	–	–	–	–	–	1	1	–	–	–	–	–
TM	TEAM		–	–	–	–	–	–	–	–	–	–	1–0	–	–
	TOTAL		575	507	1082	70 – 270	28 – 175	17 – 309	57	74	24	17	12 – 6	3	–

Key: POS: Position, SOLO: Solo tackles, AST: Assisted Tackles, TOT: Total tackles, TFL: Tackles-for-loss, SACK: Quarterback Sacks, INT: Interceptions, BU: Passes Broken Up, PD: Passes Defended, QBH: Quarterback Hits, FF: Forced Fumbles, FR: Fumbles Recovered, BLK: Kicks or Punts Blocked, SAF: Safeties

=== Special teams ===
Kicking statistics
#	NAME	POS	XPM	XPA	XP%	FGM	FGA	FG%	1–19	20–29	30–39	40–49	50+	LNG	PTS
49	Matt Wogan	PK	39	41	95.1	4	5	80	0/0	1/1	3/3	0/1	0/0	38	51
41	Alejandro Maldonado	PK	29	30	96.7	3	5	60	0/0	2/2	1/3	0/0	0/0	34	38
	TOTALS		68	71	95.9	7	10	70	0/0	3/3	4/7	0/1	0/0	38	89

Kickoff Statistics
#	NAME	POS	KICKS	YDS	AVG	TB	OB
49	Matt Wogan	PK	93	5,742	61.7	19	7
41	Alejandro Maldonado	PK	1	53	53.0	0	0
	TOTALS		94	5,795	61.6	19	7

Kick return statistics
#	NAME	POS	RTNS	YDS	AVG	TD	LNG
6	De'Anthony Thomas	RB	20	488	24.4	1	86
1	Josh Huff	WR	11	252	22.9	0	57
7	Keanon Lowe	WR	6	117	19.5	0	48
13	Troy Hill	DB	5	91	18.2	0	40
23	B.J. Kelly	WR	2	53	26.5	0	29
32	Evan Baylis	TE	1	5	5.0	0	5
84	Chad Delaney	WR	1	5	5.0	0	5
	TOTALS		47	1,027	21.9	1	86

Punting statistics
#	NAME	POS	PUNTS	YDS	AVG	LONG	TB	FC	I–20	50+	BLK
41	Alejandro Maldonado	PK	38	1,523	40.1	63	0	17	11	4	0
TM	TEAM		1	5	5.0	5	0	0	0	0	1
	TOTALS		39	1,528	39.2	63	0	17	11	4	1

Punt return statistics
#	NAME	POS	RTNS	YDS	AVG	TD	LONG
11	Bralon Addison	WR	19	285	15.0	2	75
84	Chad Delaney	WR	2	4	2.0	0	6
1	Josh Huff	WR	1	0	0.0	0	0
	TOTALS		22	289	13.1	2	75

== Notes ==
- October 6, 2013 – Colt Lyerla, the starting tight end at the beginning of the season, quits the team "for his own benefit".
- October 19, 2013 – Following a 62–38 win over Washington State, in which Washington State attempted an NCAA record 89 passes, Oregon Defensive Coordinator Nick Aliotti, during his post-game talk with the press, said the following:

"That's total (B.S.) that he threw the ball at the end of the game like he did, and you can print that and you can send it to him, and he can comment, too. I think it's low class and it's (B.S.) to throw the ball when the game is completely over against our kids that are basically our scout team."

- October 20, 2013 – Oregon Defensive Coordinator Nick Aliotti publicly apologizes for his comments regarding Washington State made the previous evening.
- October 21, 2013 – The Pac-12 Conference reprimands Oregon Defensive Coordinator Nick Aliotti and fines him $5,000 for comments made about Washington State on October 19.
- October 23, 2013 – Colt Lyerla is arrested for possession of cocaine and interfering with a police officer.
- December 3, 2013 – Starting quarterback Marcus Mariota (RSo.) and starting center Hroniss Grasu (Jr.) announce that they will bypass the NFL draft and return for the 2014 season.
- December 7, 2013 – Starting defensive end Tony Washington (Jr.) and starting linebacker Derrick Malone (Jr.) announce that they will bypass the NFL Draft and return for the 2014 season.
- December 10, 2013 – Starting tight end Pharoah Brown is suspended for the Alamo Bowl due to his role in a campus snowball fight on December 6 that got out of hand.
- December 13, 2013 – Defensive back Troy Hill is suspended from all football-related activities after being arrested for fourth-degree assault, menacing and strangulation.
- December 16, 2013 – Troy Hill is arraigned on lesser charges of menacing and criminal mischief; he enters a plea of not guilty.
- December 27, 2013 – Oregon Defensive Coordinator Nick Aliotti announces that he will retire following the Alamo Bowl. Aliotti played the running back position at UC Davis from 1972 to 1976; in 1978 he got his first coaching job as a graduate assistant at the University of Oregon under coach Rich Brooks. From 1980 to 1983, he was the running backs coach at Oregon State under coach Joe Avezzano. He then took a coaching job under future Oregon coach Mike Bellotti, as the offensive coordinator and offensive line coach at Chico State from 1984 to 1987. He followed Bellotti to Oregon in 1988, coaching outside linebackers from 1988 to 1992 and rising to the defensive coordinator's job from 1993 to 1994. Following the 1994 Rose Bowl Season, he followed Oregon head coach Rich Brooks to the NFL, coaching special teams for him with the St. Louis Rams from 1995 to 1997. After Brooks left the Rams, Aliotti returned to college coaching, as the defensive coordinator for UCLA in 1998. In 1999, Bellotti lured Aliotti back to Oregon, where he has coached as the defensive coordinator ever since.
- January 3, 2014 – Starting cornerback Terrance Mitchell (Jr.) announces that he is forgoing his senior year and declaring early eligibility for the NFL Draft.
- January 5, 2014 – Starting running back De'Anthony Thomas (Jr.) announces that he will forgo his senior year and enter the NFL Draft.
- January 6, 2014 – Starting cornerback Ifo Ekpre-Olomu (Jr.) announces that he will bypass the NFL Draft and return to Oregon for his senior season.
