= 2013 All-America college football team =

Official list of the best college football players of 2013

The 2013 All-America college football team includes those players of American college football who have been honored by various selector organizations as the best players at their respective positions. The selector organizations award the "All-America" honor annually following the conclusion of the fall college football season. The original All-America team was the 1889 All-America college football team selected by Caspar Whitney. In 1950, the National Collegiate Athletic Bureau, which is the National Collegiate Athletic Association's (NCAA) service bureau, compiled the first list of All-Americans including first-team selections on teams created for a national audience that received national circulation with the intent of recognizing selections made from viewpoints that were nationwide. Since 1957, College Sports Information Directors of America (CoSIDA) has bestowed Academic All-American recognition on male and female athletes in Divisions I, II, and III of the NCAA as well as National Association of Intercollegiate Athletics athletes, covering all NCAA championship sports.

The 2013 College Football All-America Team is composed of the following All-America first teams chosen by the following selector organizations: Associated Press (AP), Football Writers Association of America (FWAA), American Football Coaches Association (AFCA), Walter Camp Foundation (WCFF), The Sporting News (TSN), Sports Illustrated (SI), USA Today (USAT) ESPN, CBS Sports (CBS), College Football News (CFN), Scout.com, and Yahoo! Sports (Yahoo!).

Currently, the NCAA compiles consensus all-America teams in the sports of Division I-FBS football and Division I men's basketball using a point system computed from All-America teams named by coaches associations or media sources. The system consists of three points for a first-team honor, two points for second-team honor, and one point for third-team honor. Honorable mention and fourth team or lower recognitions are not accorded any points. Football consensus teams are compiled by position and the player accumulating the most points at each position is named first team consensus all-American. Currently, the NCAA recognizes All-Americans selected by the AP, AFCA, FWAA, TSN, and the WCFF to determine Consensus and Unanimous All-Americans. For the first time since 1949, the FWAA named a second team in 2013.

In 2013, there were 10 unanimous All-Americans.

Name	Position	Year	University
Jace Amaro	Tight End	Junior	Texas Tech
Darqueze Dennard	Defensive Back	Senior	Michigan St.
Aaron Donald	Defensive Line	Senior	Pittsburgh
Lamarcus Joyner	Defensive Back	Senior	Florida St.
Jake Matthews	Offensive Line	Senior	Texas A&M
C.J. Mosley	Linebacker	Senior	Alabama
Cyril Richardson	Offensive Line	Senior	Baylor
Michael Sam	Defensive Line	Senior	Missouri
Andre Williams	Running Back	Senior	Boston College
David Yankey	Offensive Line	Junior	Stanford

== Offense ==
=== Quarterback ===
- A. J. McCarron, Alabama (AFCA, WCFF)
- Jameis Winston, Florida State -- CONSENSUS -- (AP, FWAA, TSN, USAT, CBS, ESPN, SI, Athlon, FOX)

=== Running back ===
- Ka'Deem Carey, Arizona -- CONSENSUS -- (AFCA, FWAA, WCFF, AP, USAT, CBS, ESPN, SI, Athlon, FOX)
- Tre Mason, Auburn (TSN)
- Andre Williams, Boston College -- UNANIMOUS -- (AFCA, FWAA, TSN, WCFF, AP, USAT, CBS, ESPN, SI, Athlon, FOX)

=== Wide receiver ===
- Kelvin Benjamin, Florida State (SI)
- Brandin Cooks, Oregon State -- CONSENSUS -- (FWAA, TSN, WCFF, AP, CBS, ESPN, SI, Athlon, FOX)
- Mike Evans, Texas A&M -- CONSENSUS -- (AFCA, FWAA, WCFF, AP, USAT, CBS, ESPN, SI, FOX)
- Jordan Matthews, Vanderbilt (USAT, Athlon)
- Allen Robinson, Penn State (TSN, CBS)
- Sammy Watkins, Clemson (AFCA)

=== Tight end ===
- Jace Amaro, Texas Tech -- UNANIMOUS -- (AFCA, FWAA, TSN, WCFF, AP, CBS, SI, USAT, Athlon, FOX)
- Eric Ebron, North Carolina (ESPN)

=== Offensive line ===
- Cameron Erving, Florida State (TSN, SI, USAT)
- Hroniss Grasu, Oregon (SI, Athlon)
- Gabe Ikard, Oklahoma -- CONSENSUS -- (AFCA, WCFF, CBS, FOX)
- Cyrus Kouandjio, Alabama -- CONSENSUS -- (AFCA, FWAA, WCFF, AP, CBS, Athlon)
- Taylor Lewan, Michigan (TSN, FOX)
- Jake Matthews, Texas A&M -- UNANIMOUS -- (AFCA, FWAA, TSN, WCFF, AP, USAT, CBS, ESPN, SI, Athlon, FOX)
- Jack Mewhort, Ohio State (ESPN)
- Cyril Richardson, Baylor -- UNANIMOUS -- (AFCA, FWAA, TSN, WCFF, AP, USAT, CBS, ESPN, SI, Athlon, FOX)
- Bryan Stork, Florida State -- CONSENSUS -- (AP, FWAA, ESPN)
- Travis Swanson, Arkansas (USAT)
- David Yankey, Stanford -- UNANIMOUS -- (AFCA, FWAA, TSN, WCFF, AP, USAT, CBS, ESPN, SI, Athlon, FOX)

== Defense ==
=== Defensive line ===
- Vic Beasley, Clemson -- CONSENSUS -- (TSN, WCFF, CBS, SI, USAT, Athlon)
- Jadeveon Clowney, South Carolina (AFCA)
- Aaron Donald, Pittsburgh -- UNANIMOUS -- (AFCA, FWAA, TSN, WCFF, AP, USAT, CBS, ESPN, SI, Athlon, FOX)
- Jackson Jeffcoat, Texas -- CONSENSUS -- (AFCA, WCFF, AP, FOX)
- Timmy Jernigan, Florida State (ESPN, Athlon)
- Kelcy Quarles, South Carolina (TSN)
- Michael Sam, Missouri -- UNANIMOUS -- (AFCA, FWAA, TSN, WCFF, AP, USAT, CBS, ESPN, SI, Athlon, FOX)
- Marcus Smith, Louisville (FWAA)
- Will Sutton, Arizona State (AP, CBS, USAT, FOX)
- Leonard Williams, Southern California (ESPN)

=== Linebacker ===
- Anthony Barr, UCLA -- CONSENSUS -- (AFCA, TSN, WCFF, AP, CBS, SI, USAT, Athlon, FOX)
- Chris Borland, Wisconsin (FWAA)
- Khalil Mack, Buffalo (FWAA, CBS, SI)
- C. J. Mosley, Alabama -- UNANIMOUS -- (AFCA, FWAA, TSN, WCFF, AP, USAT, CBS, ESPN, Athlon, FOX)
- Trent Murphy, Stanford -- CONSENSUS -- (AFCA, FWAA, TSN, WCFF, ESPN, SI, FOX)
- Ryan Shazier, Ohio State (AP, USAT, ESPN, SI, Athlon)

=== Defensive back ===
- Terrence Brooks, Florida State (CBS)
- Deone Bucannon, Washington State (AP, Athlon)
- Ha Ha Clinton-Dix, Alabama -- CONSENSUS -- (AFCA, FWAA, TSN, ESPN, FOX)
- Darqueze Dennard, Michigan State -- UNANIMOUS -- (AFCA, FWAA, TSN, WCFF, AP, USAT, CBS, ESPN, SI, Athlon, FOX)
- Ahmad Dixon, Baylor (AFCA, TSN)
- Ifo Ekpre-Olomu, Oregon (ESPN, FOX)
- Justin Gilbert, Oklahoma State -- CONSENSUS -- (FWAA, WCFF, CBS)
- Anthony Harris, Virginia (SI)
- Lamarcus Joyner, Florida State -- UNANIMOUS -- (AFCA, FWAA, TSN, WCFF, AP, USAT, ESPN, SI, Athlon)
- Cody Prewitt, Ole Miss (AP, USAT)
- Ed Reynolds, Stanford (CBS, Athlon)
- Jason Verrett, TCU (WCFF)
- Jimmie Ward, Northern Illinois (SI, USAT)

== Special teams ==
=== Kicker ===
- Roberto Aguayo, Florida State (WCFF, AP, CBS, SI, USAT, Athlon)
- Jeff Budzien, Northwestern (TSN)
- Anthony Fera, Texas -- CONSENSUS -- (AFCA, FWAA, WCFF)
- Nate Freese, Boston College (ESPN)

=== Punter ===
- Tom Hornsey, Memphis -- CONSENSUS -- (AFCA, AP, FWAA, USAT, Athlon)
- Drew Kaser, Texas A&M (TSN, SI)
- Austin Rehkow, Idaho (WCFF)
- Mike Sadler, Michigan State (CBS, ESPN)

=== All-purpose / return specialist ===
- Antonio Andrews, Western Kentucky (SI)
- Odell Beckham Jr., LSU (FWAA, CBS)
- Chris Davis, Auburn (TSN, CBS)
- Myles Jack, UCLA (Athlon, FOX)
- Jordan Lynch, Northern Illinois (AP)
- Ty Montgomery, Stanford -- CONSENSUS -- (AFCA, TSN, WCFF, CBS, SI, USAT, Athlon, FOX)
- Ryan Switzer, North Carolina (FWAA, ESPN, Athlon)

== See also ==
- 2013 All-Big 12 Conference football team
- 2013 All-Big Ten Conference football team
- 2013 All-Pac-12 Conference football team
- 2013 All-SEC football team
