= 2013 All-Pac-12 Conference football team =

The 2013 All-Pac-12 Conference football team consists of American football players chosen by various organizations for All-Pac-12 honors for the 2013 Pac-12 season. The Stanford Cardinal won the conference, defeating the Arizona State Sun Devils 38 to 14 in the Pac-12 Championship game. Stanford then lost to the Big Ten champion Michigan State Spartans in the Rose Bowl 20 to 14. Arizona running back Ka'Deem Carey was voted Pac-12 Offensive Player of the Year. Arizona State defensive tackle Will Sutton was voted Pat Tillman Pac-12 Defensive Player of the Year.

== Offensive selections ==
=== Quarterbacks ===
- Marcus Mariota, Oregon (Coaches-1)
- Taylor Kelly, Arizona St. (2nd)

=== Running backs ===
- Ka'Deem Carey, Arizona (Coaches-1)
- Bishop Sankey, Washington (Coaches-1)
- Tyler Gaffney, Stanford (Coaches-2)
- Marion Grice, Arizona St. (Coaches-2)

=== Wide receivers ===
- Brandin Cooks, Oregon St. (Coaches-1)
- Paul Richardson, Colorado (Coaches-1)
- Ty Montgomery, Stanford (Coaches-2)
- Jaelen Strong, Arizona St. (Coaches-2)

=== Tight ends ===
- Chris Coyle, Arizona St. (Coaches-1)
- Austin Seferian-Jenkins, Washington (Coaches-2)

=== Tackles ===
- Marcus Martin, USC (Coaches-1)
- Andrus Peat, Stanford (Coaches-2)
- Cameron Fleming, Stanford (Coaches-2)

=== Guards ===
- David Yankey, Stanford (Coaches-1)
- Xavier Su'a-Filo, UCLA (Coaches-1)
- Evan Finkenberg, Arizona St. (Coaches-1)
- Jamil Douglas, Arizona St. (Coaches-2)
- Isaac Seumalo, Oregon St. (Coaches-2)
- Khalil Wilkes, Stanford (Coaches-2)

=== Centers ===
- Hroniss Grasu, Oregon (Coaches-1)

== Defensive selections ==
=== Ends ===
- Ben Gardner, Stanford (Coaches-1)
- Leonard Williams, USC (Coaches-1)
- Trevor Reilly, Utah (Coaches-1)
- Scott Crichton, Oregon St. (Coaches-2)
- Taylor Hart, Oregon (Coaches-2)
- Hau'oli Kikaha, Washington (Coaches-2)
- Devon Kennard, USC (Coaches-2)
- Tenny Palepoi, Utah (Coaches-2)

=== Tackles ===
- Will Sutton, Arizona St. (Coaches-1)

=== Linebackers ===
- Anthony Barr, UCLA (Coaches-1)
- Trent Murphy, Stanford (Coaches-1)
- Shayne Skov, Stanford (Coaches-1)
- Carl Bradford, Arizona St. (Coaches-2)
- Myles Jack, UCLA (Coaches-2)
- Hayes Pullard, USC (Coaches-2)
- Chris Young, Arizona St. (Coaches-2)

=== Cornerbacks ===
- Ifo Ekpre-Olomu, Oregon (Coaches-1)
- Alden Darby, Arizona St. (Coaches-1)
- Robert Nelson, Arizona St. (Coaches-1)
- Marcus Peters, Washington (Coaches-2)
- Rashaad Reynolds, Oregon St. (Coaches-2)
- Osahon Irabor, Arizona St. (Coaches-2)

=== Safeties ===
- Ed Reynolds, Stanford (Coaches-1)
- Deone Bucannon, Washington St. (Coaches-1)
- Dion Bailey, USC (Coaches-2)

== Special teams ==
=== Placekickers ===
- Zane Gonzales, Arizona St. (Coaches-1)
- Vincenzo D'Amato, California (Coaches-2)

=== Punters ===
- Tom Hackett, Utah (Coaches-1)
- Travis Coons, Washington (Coaches-2)

=== Return specialists ===
- Ty Montgomery, Stanford (Coaches-1)
- Nelson Agholor, USC (Coaches-2)

=== Special teams player ===
- Soma Vainuku, USC (Coaches-1)
- Erick Dargan, Oregon (Coaches-2)
- Joe Hemschoot, Stanford (Coaches-2)
- Ryan Hoffmeister, UCLA (Coaches-2)

== Key ==
Coaches = selected by the Pac-12 coaches

== See also ==
- 2013 College Football All-America Team
