= 2013 Alamo Bowl =

2013 Valero Alamo Bowl
Oregon Ducks	Texas Longhorns
(10–2)	(8–4)
Pac-12	Big 12
30	7
Head coach: Mark Helfrich	Head coach: Mack Brown
AP / Coaches / BCS; 10 / 12 / 10
	1	2	3	4	Total
Oregon	10	10	3	7	30
Texas	7	0	0	0	7
- Date: December 30, 2013
- Season: 2013
- Stadium: Alamodome
- Location: San Antonio, Texas, U.S.
- MVP: Offense: Marcus Mariota (QB); Defense: Avery Patterson (SS)
- Favorite: Oregon by 13
- National anthem: Oregon Marching Band & The University of Texas Longhorn Band
- Referee: Dennis Hennigan (ACC)
- Halftime show: World Strides Heritage Performance Program
- Attendance: 65,918
- Payout: US$3 million per team

United States TV coverage
- Network: ESPN
- Announcers: Brad Nessler, Todd Blackledge & Holly Rowe
- Nielsen ratings: 4.6 (6.757 million viewers)

The 2013 Alamo Bowl was an American college football bowl game that was played on December 30, 2013, at the Alamodome in San Antonio, Texas. The 21st edition of the Alamo Bowl, it featured the Oregon Ducks from the Pac-12 Conference and the Texas Longhorns from the Big 12 Conference. It was telecast at 5:45 p.m. CST on ESPN. It was one of the 2013–14 bowl games that concluded the 2013 FBS football season. The game was sponsored by the Valero Energy Corporation and was officially known as the Valero Alamo Bowl. Oregon defeated Texas by a score of 30–7.

Oregon, ranked number 10 in the BCS, finished the regular season with a record of 10–2 (7–2 Pac-12), co-champions of the Pac-12 North Division. Texas finished the regular season with a record of 8–4 (7–2 Big 12), tied for second place in the Big 12.

== Teams ==
=== Oregon ===
Oregon was selected to represent the Pac-12 after a 10–2 regular season, finishing second overall in the conference. In their first season with new head coach Mark Helfrich after Chip Kelly's departure to the NFL, they started the season ranked third in both major polls, and won their first eight games over Nicholls State, Virginia, Tennessee, California, Colorado, Washington, Washington State and UCLA. Going into November sitting at 8–0 and contending for the a slot in the BCS National Championship Game they finished the season 2–2 with road losses to Stanford and Arizona and home wins against Utah and arch-rival Oregon State finishing the season ranked tenth in the AP and BCS polls.

=== Texas ===
Texas was selected to represent the Big 12 after an 8–4 season, finishing third overall in the conference. Starting the season ranked 15th in both major polls, Texas would start the season disappointingly by going 1–2 against non-conference opponents with a win over New Mexico State and losses to BYU and Ole Miss. They would eventually contend for the Big-12 Championship by starting their conference schedule at 6–0 with wins over Kansas State, Iowa State, Oklahoma, TCU, Kansas and West Virginia. They would finish their remaining conference slate with a home loss to Oklahoma State, rebound to beat Texas Tech after a bye week and finish the season with a road loss to Baylor, finishing the season unranked in the polls.

== Game summary ==
=== Scoring summary ===
2013 Valero Alamo Bowl – Game summary

Quarter	1	2	3	4	Total
#10 Oregon	10	10	3	7	30
Texas	7	0	0	0	7

at Alamodome • San Antonio, TX

- Date: December 30, 2013
- Game time: 6:51 p.m. EST
- Game weather: Indoors
- Game attendance: 65,918
- Referee: Dennis Hennigan (ACC) • Umpire: Jim Hyson • Linesman: Matt Fitzgerald • Line judge: Deon Lawerence • Back judge: Barry Hendon • Field judge: Bill Dolbow • Side judge: Mike Safrit
- TV announcers (ESPN): Brad Nessler, Todd Blackledge & Holly Rowe

Game information

First quarter

- ORE – Avery Patterson 37-yard interception return (Matt Wogan kick)
- ORE – Wogan 25-yard field goal
- TEX – Case McCoy 1-yard run (Anthony Fera kick)

Second quarter

- ORE – Wogan 32-yard field goal
- ORE – Josh Huff 16 yard-pass from Marcus Mariota (Wogan kick)

Third quarter

- ORE – Wogan 39-yard field goal

Fourth quarter

- ORE – Derrick Malone 38-yard interception return (Wogan kick)
- Texas leads the series with Oregon, 4–1 (.800). The series began in 1941 at Texas, Texas 71, Oregon 7. The last meeting was the 2000 Holiday Bowl, Oregon 35, Texas 30.

Top passers

- ORE – Marcus Mariota, 18–26, 253 yards, 1 TD
- TEX – Case McCoy, 8–17, 48 yards, 2 INT

Top rushers

- ORE – Marcus Mariota, 15 attempts, 134 yards
- TEX – Malcolm Brown, 26 attempts, 130 yards

Top receiving

- ORE – Josh Huff, 5 receptions, 104 yards, 1 TD
- TEX – Joe Bergeron, 2 receptions, 16 yards

Top tackler

- ORE –
- TEX –

Scoring summary

Quarter	Time	Drive			Team	Scoring information	Score	
Quarter	Time	Plays	Yards	TOP	Team	Scoring information	Oregon	Texas
1	13:52	4	-8	1:08	ORE	Interception returned 37 yards for touchdown by Avery Patterson, Matt Wogan kick good	7	0
1	8:36	11	68	3:02	ORE	25-yard field goal by Wogan	10	0
1	1:24	16	79	7:12	TEX	Case McCoy 1-yard touchdown run, Anthony Fera kick good	10	7
2	12:30	10	60	3:54	ORE	32-yard field goal by Wogan	13	7
2	0:44	7	88	1:24	ORE	Josh Huff 16-yard touchdown reception from Marcus Mariota, Wogan kick good	20	7
3	13:06	7	44	1:54	ORE	39-yard field goal by Wogan	23	7
4	8:55	10	24	5:11	ORE	Interception returned 38 yards for touchdown by Derrick Malone, Wogan kick good	30	7
"TOP" = time of possession. For other American football terms, see Glossary of American football.							30	7

=== Statistics ===
Teams	Oregon	Texas
1st downs	24	13
Total yards	470	236
Passing yards	253	56
Rushing yards	217	180
Penalties–Yards	11-87	4–35
3rd down conversions	4 of 12	6 of 19
4th down conversions	0 of 0	2 of 3
Turnovers	0	2
Time of possession	28:15	31:45

== Notes ==
- This was the second year in a row that Texas played in the Alamo Bowl, having beaten Oregon State in the 2012 Alamo Bowl, 31–27.
- This was the second time that Oregon and Texas have faced off in the post-season, the only other time being the 2000 Holiday Bowl, where Oregon beat Texas 35–30, Oregon's only win in the series.
- While all bowl games are technically considered neutral site games, the Ducks and their accompanying fans had to either travel over 1,600 miles by air or drive over 2,000 miles from Eugene, Oregon, whereas the Longhorns are based less than 100 miles away from San Antonio, in Austin.
- December 10, 2013 – Oregon starting tight end Pharaoh Brown was suspended for the Alamo Bowl due to his role in a campus snowball fight on December 6 that got out of hand.
- December 13, 2013 – Oregon defensive back Troy Hill was suspended from all football-related activities after being arrested for fourth-degree assault, menacing and strangulation.
- December 14, 2013 – Texas head coach Mack Brown announced his resignation following the Alamo Bowl after 16 years as head coach of Longhorns, having led them to six Big 12 South Division Championships, two Big 12 Conference Championships, and the 2005 BCS National Championship with an overall record of 158–47 (.771).
- December 16, 2013 – Troy Hill was arraigned on lesser charges of menacing and criminal mischief, and entered a plea of not guilty.
- December 22, 2013 – Texas wide receiver Daje Johnson (So.), offensive tackle Kennedy Estelle (So.) and running back Jalen Overstreet (Fr.) were declared academically ineligible to participate in the 2013 Alamo Bowl. Johnson had 757 all-purpose yards on the year, Estelle had started 8 games at right tackle and Overstreet has 102 rushing yards with two touchdowns.
- December 27, 2013 – Oregon Defensive Coordinator Nick Aliotti announced his retirement following the Alamo Bowl. Aliotti coached at Oregon for a total of 26 years, as a graduate assistant from 1978 to 1979, as the outside linebackers coach from 1988 to 1992 and then as the defensive coordinator from 1993 to 1994. He then followed former Oregon head coach Rich Brooks to the NFL in 1995 and returned to Oregon after coaching at UCLA for one season, in 1999, where he has coached ever since.
