= Nick Aliotti =

American football player and coach (born 1954)

Biographical details
- Born: May 29, 1954 (age 72); Pittsburg, California, U.S.

Playing career
- 1972–1976: UC Davis
- Position: Running back

Coaching career (HC unless noted)
- 1978–1979: Oregon (GA)
- 1980–1983: Oregon State (RB)
- 1984–1987: Chico State (OC/OL)
- 1988–1992: Oregon (OLB)
- 1993–1994: Oregon (DC/DB)
- 1995–1997: St. Louis Rams (ST)
- 1998: UCLA (DC/DB)
- 1999–2013: Oregon (DC)
- 2019: Arizona Hotshots (DC)

Nick Aliotti (born May 29, 1954) is an American football coach. He was recently the defensive coordinator of the Arizona Hotshots of the Alliance of American Football.

== Early life and playing career ==
The eldest of five children, Aliotti grew up northeast of San Francisco in Pittsburg, California, where his father Joe (1928–2016) worked for U.S. Steel for decades. He graduated from Pittsburg High School in 1972 and enrolled at UC Davis, where he earned three letters as running back, and was named MVP of the freshman team.

== Coaching career ==
After graduation from Davis, Aliotti spent two years as a graduate assistant football coach on Rich Brooks' staff at Oregon, and in 1980, was hired as the running backs coach by new Oregon State coach Joe Avezzano. After four years with the Beavers, Aliotti was hired as offensive coordinator at Chico State. In 1988, he returned to Oregon as linebackers coach, later becoming defensive coordinator.

After the 1994 season and the Rose Bowl, Brooks was hired by the St. Louis Rams of the NFL, and Aliotti went with him as special teams coach. Brooks lasted just two seasons with the Rams, and Aliotti became the defensive coordinator at UCLA in 1998. He returned to Eugene in 1999 and was the defensive coordinator for the next fifteen seasons under head coaches Mike Bellotti, Chip Kelly, and Mark Helfrich.

Allioti retired following the 2013 season, after the Alamo Bowl.

In 2018, he returned to coaching as the defensive coordinator of the Arizona Hotshots of the Alliance of American Football.

== Personal ==
Aliotti's brother Joe was the starting quarterback at Boise State (1979, 1980); a junior college transfer (Los Medanos), he led the Broncos to a 10–1 record as a junior and the Division I-AA national championship as a senior.
