= David Yankey =

American football player (born 1992)

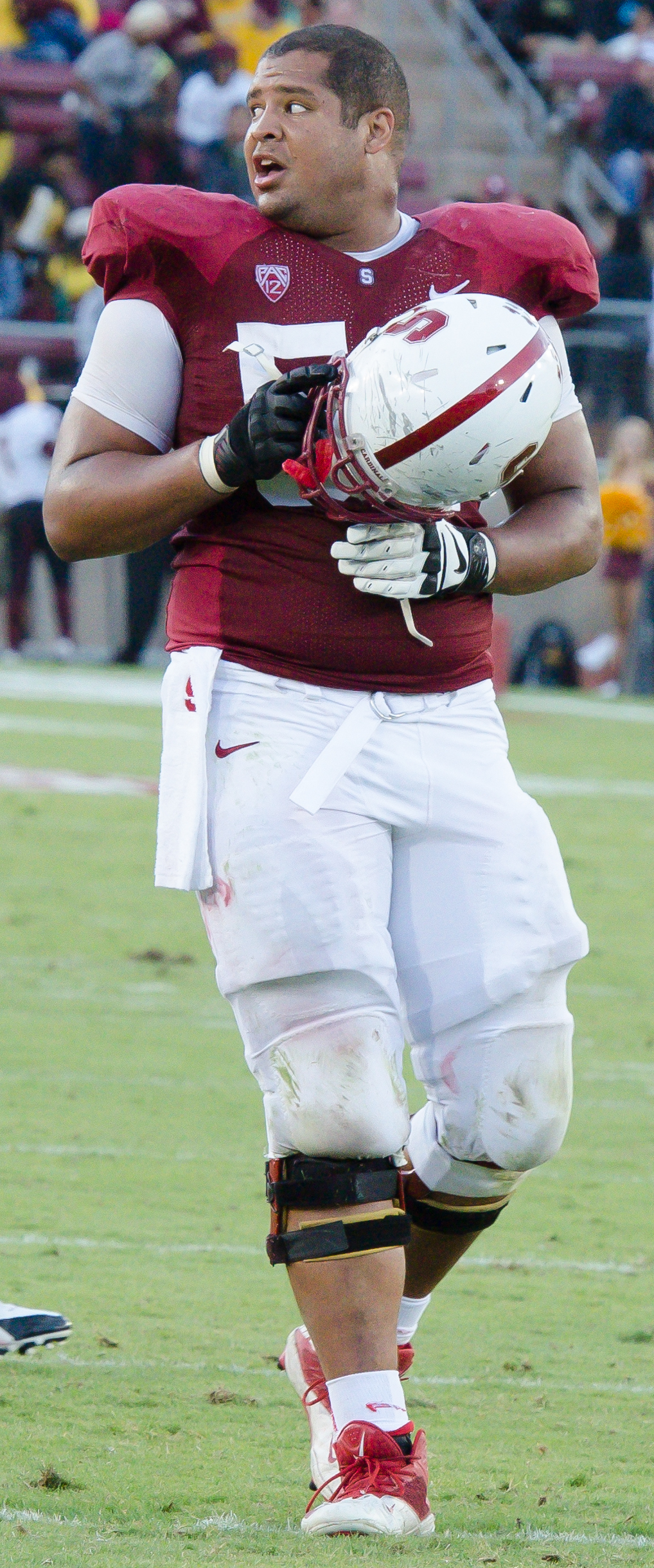
- Yankey with Stanford in 2013

No. 61, 66
- Position: Offensive guard

Personal information
- Born: 18 January 1992 (age 34); Sydney, Australia
- Listed height: 6 ft 6 in (1.98 m)
- Listed weight: 315 lb (143 kg)

Career information
- High school: Centennial (Roswell, Georgia, U.S.)
- College: Stanford
- NFL draft: 2014: 5th round, 145th overall pick

Career history
- Minnesota Vikings (2014–2015); Carolina Panthers (2016–2017)

Awards and highlights
- Morris Trophy (2012); 2× Consensus All-American (2012, 2013); 2× First-team All-Pac-12 (2012, 2013)

Career NFL statistics
- Games played: 6
- Stats at Pro Football Reference

David Famiyekyi Yankey (born January 18, 1992) is an Australian-American former professional player of American football who was an offensive guard in the National Football League (NFL). He played college football for the Stanford Cardinal, twice earning consensus All-American honors. He was selected by the Minnesota Vikings in the fifth round of the 2014 NFL draft.

== Early life ==
Yankey attended Centennial High School in Roswell, Georgia, where he earned four varsity letters playing as an offensive lineman for head coach Jeff Measor. He was a three-time All-region selection. As a senior, he earned honorable mention All-state honors. He also earned Centennial's Excalibur Award, an award that honors excellence in athletics, character, and leadership.

Regarded as a three-star recruit by Rivals.com, Yankey was ranked as the No. 47 offensive tackle in his class, while Scout.com rated him as the 44th best offensive tackle in the nation.

== College career ==
Yankey attended Stanford University, where he played for coach Jim Harbaugh and coach David Shaw's Stanford Cardinal football teams from 2010 to 2013. He was a consensus All-American in 2012 and 2013. He announced on January 13, 2014, that he would enter the 2014 NFL draft.

== Professional career ==
Pre-draft measurables
Height	Weight	Arm length	Hand span	40-yard dash	10-yard split	20-yard split	20-yard shuttle	Three-cone drill	Vertical jump	Broad jump	Bench press
6 ft 6 in (1.98 m)	315 lb (143 kg)	34 in (0.86 m)	9 1/2 in (0.24 m)	5.48 s	1.86 s	3.13 s	4.69 s	7.81 s	30 in (0.76 m)	8 ft 7 in (2.62 m)	25 reps
All values from NFL Combine and Pro Day

=== Minnesota Vikings ===
Yankey was selected by the Minnesota Vikings in the fifth round (145th overall) of the 2014 NFL draft.

On September 5, 2015, he was waived by the Vikings and was signed to the practice squad the next day.

=== Carolina Panthers ===
The Carolina Panthers signed Yankey to a futures contract on January 12, 2016. On September 3, 2016, he was waived by the Panthers as part of final roster cuts. The next day he was signed to the Panthers' practice squad. He was promoted to the active roster on November 25, 2016.

On September 1, 2017, Yankey was placed on injured reserve.

== Personal life ==
Yankey was born in Sydney, Australia to David and Darina Yankey. He retained his Australian citizenship after his family moved to Roswell, Georgia when he was eight. He became a U.S. citizen in 2014.
