= Ed Reynolds (safety) =

American football player (born 1991)

No. 30, 39
- Position: Safety

Personal information
- Born: October 18, 1991 (age 35); Greensboro, North Carolina, U.S.
- Listed height: 6 ft 1 in (1.85 m)
- Listed weight: 206 lb (93 kg)

Career information
- High school: Woodberry Forest School (Woodberry Forest, Virginia)
- College: Stanford
- NFL draft: 2014: 5th round, 162nd overall pick

Career history
- Philadelphia Eagles (2014–2015); Cleveland Browns (2016); Atlanta Legends (2019); Houston Roughnecks (2020)*
- * Offseason or practice squad member only

Awards and highlights
- Jack Tatum Trophy (2012); Third-team All-American (2013); 2× First-team All-Pac-12 (2012, 2013)

Career NFL statistics
- Total tackles: 64
- Sacks: 1
- Pass deflections: 2
- Interceptions: 1
- Stats at Pro Football Reference

Edward Rannell Reynolds II (born October 18, 1991) is an American former professional football player who was a safety. He played college football for the Stanford Cardinal. His father is the former NFL linebacker and league official of the same name, Ed Reynolds.

== College career ==
In 2012, Reynolds was a third-team All-American by the Associated Press. He also won the Jack Tatum Trophy.

Reynolds entered the 2014 NFL draft after his junior season.

== Professional career ==
=== Philadelphia Eagles ===
Reynolds was selected by the Philadelphia Eagles in the fifth round, 162nd overall, in the 2014 NFL draft. He was released on August 30, 2014, but signed with the practice squad the next day.

On September 4, 2015, Reynolds was cut in the last round of preseason cuts and signed to the practice squad on September 6, 2015. He was promoted to the 53-man active roster on November 20, 2015.

On December 13, 2015, in a game against the Buffalo Bills he recorded his first career interception.

On September 3, 2016, Reynolds was released by the Eagles.

=== Cleveland Browns ===
On September 5, 2016, Reynolds was signed to the Browns' practice squad. He was signed to the active roster on October 18, 2016.

Reynolds was waived/injured by the Browns on August 29, 2017 and placed on injured reserve. Reynolds was released by the Browns on September 4, 2017.

=== Atlanta Legends ===
In 2019, Reynolds joined the Atlanta Legends of the Alliance of American Football. The league ceased operations in April 2019.

=== Houston Roughnecks ===
Reynolds was selected in the 6th round during phase four in the 2020 XFL Draft by the Houston Roughnecks. He was waived by January 5, 2020.
