= Taylor Hart =

American football player (born 1991)

No. 97, 96
- Position: Defensive end

Personal information
- Born: February 22, 1991 (age 35); Tualatin, Oregon, U.S.
- Listed height: 6 ft 6 in (1.98 m)
- Listed weight: 305 lb (138 kg)

Career information
- High school: Tualatin
- College: Oregon
- NFL draft: 2014: 5th round, 141st overall pick

Career history
- Philadelphia Eagles (2014–2015); San Francisco 49ers (2016); Philadelphia Eagles (2016–2018)

Awards and highlights
- Second-team All-Pac-12 (2013)

Career NFL statistics
- Total tackles: 29
- Stats at Pro Football Reference

Taylor Hart (born February 22, 1991) is an American former professional football player who was a defensive end in the National Football League (NFL). He was selected by the Philadelphia Eagles in the fifth round of the 2014 NFL draft. He played college football for the Oregon Ducks.

== Early life ==
Hart attended Tualatin High School in Tualatin, Oregon, where he was a first-team all-state selection on both offense and defense.

Considered a three-star recruit by Rivals.com, he was rated as the 26th best strongside defensive end prospect of his class, and second best prospect from the state of Oregon.

== College career ==
Hart attended the University of Oregon from 2009 to 2013, where he was a member of the Oregon Ducks football team. During his career, he accumulated 173 tackles, including 22 for loss, 16 sacks, 11 pass deflections and five forced fumbles. As a senior, he recorded a career season high 72 tackles, and was named a second-team All-Pac-12 Conference selection.

Taylor met his wife, Lauren Hart in December 2010. The two married in March 2015.

== Professional career ==
=== Philadelphia Eagles (first stint) ===
He was selected by the Philadelphia Eagles in the fifth round (141st overall) of the 2014 NFL draft. On September 4, 2016, he was released by the Eagles.

=== San Francisco 49ers ===
On September 5, 2016, Hart was claimed off waivers by the 49ers. He was released on October 22, 2016.

=== Philadelphia Eagles (second stint) ===
On October 24, 2016, the Philadelphia Eagles claimed Hart off waivers. Throughout the season, Hart took snaps at offensive tackle with the scout team. On January 18, 2017, the Eagles announced they officially moved him from defensive end to offensive tackle. He was waived on September 2, 2017. He was re-signed by the Eagles to a two-year contract after an injury to Jason Peters. He was released on November 14, 2017.

On February 14, 2018, Hart re-signed with the Eagles. He was released on September 1, 2018.
