= Will Sutton =

American football player (born 1991)

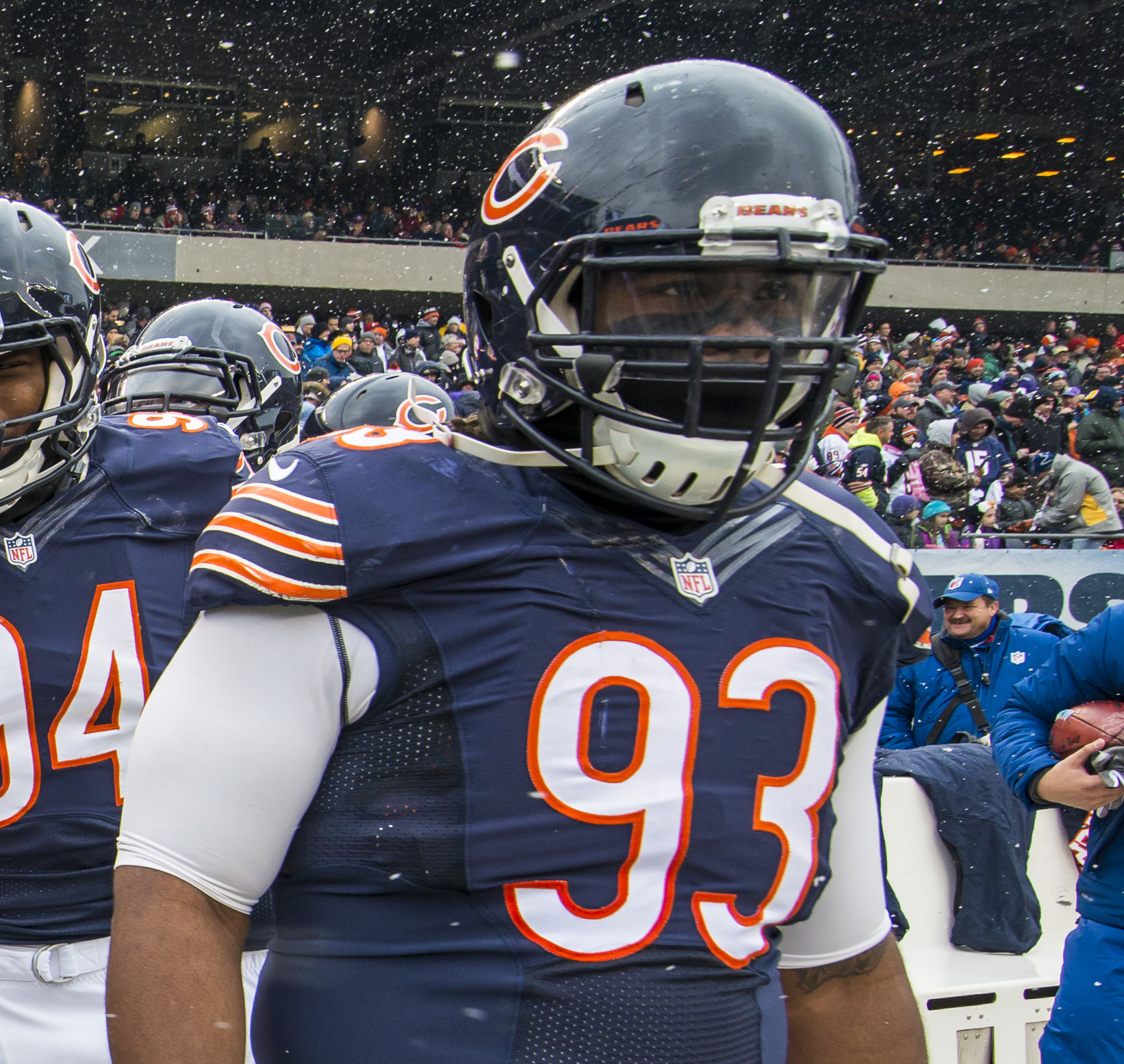
- Sutton playing for the Chicago Bears in 2014

No. 93
- Position: Defensive tackle

Personal information
- Born: October 3, 1991 (age 35); Corona, California, U.S.
- Listed height: 6 ft 1 in (1.85 m)
- Listed weight: 289 lb (131 kg)

Career information
- High school: Centennial (Corona)
- College: Arizona State
- NFL draft: 2014: 3rd round, 82nd overall pick

Career history
- Chicago Bears (2014–2016); Minnesota Vikings (2017)*; San Francisco 49ers (2018)*; Arizona Hotshots (2019); Seattle Dragons (2020)
- * Offseason or practice squad member only

Awards and highlights
- Consensus All-American (2012); First-team All-American (2013); 2× Pac-12 Defensive Player of the Year (2012, 2013); 2× Morris Trophy (2012, 2013); 2× First-team All-Pac-12 (2012, 2013); Mid Season All-XFL (2020)

Career NFL statistics
- Total tackles: 60
- Pass deflections: 7
- Stats at Pro Football Reference

William Sutton (born October 3, 1991) is an American former professional football player who was a defensive tackle in the National Football League (NFL). He was selected by the Chicago Bears in the third round of the 2014 NFL draft. He played college football for the Arizona State Sun Devils.

As a member of the 2012 team, Sutton earned Pac-12 Defensive Player of the Year and a consensus All-American selection. In high school, he led the undefeated 2008 Centennial High School California Interscholastic Federation (CIF) state championship football team in quarterback sacks. He is the son of Mickey Sutton.

== Early life ==
As a sophomore at Centennial High School in Corona, California in 2006, he totaled 11 tackles for the high school football team. Centennial finished the 2007 season with a 13–2 record and ranked 24 by USA Today. Sutton had 48 tackles for the 2007 team. The undefeated 2008 Huskies team won a California Interscholastic Federation (CIF) state championship with the help of quarterback Taylor Martinez and Vontaze Burfict. The team finished the 2008 season ranked No. 2 in the nation by USA Today. Sutton totaled 101 tackles, led the state champions with 11.5 quarterback sacks and had four blocked punts. Sutton was one of five Arizona State signees (three from class of 2008) from Centennial High School along with fellow Class of 2009 recruit Burfict.

College recruiting
Name	Hometown	School	Height	Weight	40^{‡}	Commit date
Will Sutton; DT	Corona, CA	Centennial High School (CA)	6 ft 1 in (1.85 m)	261.5 lb (118.6 kg)	5.04	Jan 18, 2009
Will Sutton; DT	Recruit ratings: Scout: Rivals: (75)					
Overall recruit ranking: Scout: 33 (DT) Rivals: 42 (DT), 40 (CA) ESPN: 68 (DT)
Note: In many cases, Scout, Rivals, 247Sports, On3, and ESPN may conflict in their listings of height and weight.; In these cases, the average was taken. ESPN grades are on a 100-point scale.; Sources: "2009 Arizona State Football Commits". Rivals.; "2009 Arizona State Football Commits". Scout.; "ESPN". ESPN.; "Scout.com Team Recruiting Rankings". Scout.; "2009 Team Ranking". Rivals.com.

== College career ==
When he arrived at Arizona State, Sutton was expected to serve as a backup to returning Freshman All-American Lawrence Guy. As a true freshman for the 2009 Sun Devils, Sutton played 12 games, including 2 starts, at a playing weight of 300 pounds (136 kg). That season, against Washington State on October 10, 2009, both of his tackles were for a loss resulting in a quarterback sack and a forced fumble as part of a 27–14 victory. The following season, he dropped 15 pounds (6.8 kg), but he was ruled academically ineligible. By 2010, Arizona had six Centennial players on the roster (linebackers Burfict, Brandon Magee and Shelly Lyons, defensive linemen Sutton and Lee Adams and wide receiver Angelo Magee), who were dubbed the Corona Six-Pack, a reference to the municipality and Corona Beer. For the 2011 season, he cut down to 261 pounds (118 kg).

In the September 8, 2012 45–14 victory against Illinois, Sutton had 8 tackles, 3 for a loss (including a quarterback sack). In the September 29, 27–17 victory against Cal, he had 8 tackles, 4 for a loss (including three quarterback sacks and a forced fumble) and earned Pac-12 Conference Defensive Player of the Week on October 1. In the following game, which resulted in a 51–17 victory against Colorado on October 11, Sutton posted 3 tackles for a loss, including 2 quarterback sacks. In the December 29, 2012 Kraft Fight Hunger Bowl against Navy, Sutton had 3.5 tackles for a loss, including 2.5 sacks.

Sutton was among the 2012 national statistical leaders in both sacks and tackles for a loss, and he helped the Arizona State defense rank among the national leaders in team sacks. He earned first-team All-Pac-12 defensive lineman recognition for the 2012 Pac-12 Conference football season by the Pac-12 head coaches as well as by CBS Sports. That season, he was named the 2012 Pac-12 Pat Tillman Defensive Player of the Year by the conference coaches as well as the conference Defensive Player of the Year by CBS Sports. He was then selected to various 2012 College Football All-America Teams, earning consensus All-American recognition. He was the fifteenth different Sun Devil and first since Thomas Weber in 2007 to earn the honor. The following organizations chose him to their first team: American Football Coaches Association, the Associated Press (AP), Athlon Sports, CBSSports.com, Lindy's Sports, Sporting News, Sports Illustrated. He was also chosen to the second team by FoxSportsNext.com (formerly Scout.com) and Walter Camp Football Foundation. He was also the co-winner of the Morris Trophy, by vote of the Pac-12 conference's offensive linemen.

On January 8, 2013, Sutton announced that he will return to Arizona State University to play out his senior year. For the season, he had 10.5 tackles for a loss, including 3 sacks, and repeated Pat Tillman Defensive Player of the Year and first team All-Pac-12 Team. Following the regular season, he earned first team All-American recognition by the AP, CBSSports.com, USA Today, second team recognition by Athlon Sports, and honorable mention recognition by Sports Illustrated.

=== Statistics ===
Year	Team	GP	GS	TT	Solo	Ast	TFL	Sack	PDef	INT	FR	FF
2009	Arizona State	12	3	17	6	11	3	1	0	0	0	1
2011	Arizona State	13	12	33	19	14	5½	2½	1	0	0	0
2012	Arizona State	12	12	63	41	22	23½	13	5	0	0	3
Totals		37	27	113	66	47	32	16½	6	0	0	4

== Professional career ==
Pre-draft measurables
Height	Weight	Arm length	Hand span	40-yard dash	20-yard shuttle	Three-cone drill	Vertical jump	Broad jump	Bench press
6 ft 1 in (1.85 m)	303 lb (137 kg)	31 1/4 in (0.79 m)	10 in (0.25 m)	5.36 s	4.82 s	7.93 s	28.5 in (0.72 m)	8 ft 3 in (2.51 m)	24 reps
All values from NFL Combine

=== Chicago Bears ===
Sutton was selected by the Chicago Bears with the 82nd overall pick in the third round of the 2014 NFL draft. He signed a four-year deal on May 15, 2014, which rendered the Bears to be the first team to sign their whole draft class. On September 7, he posted his first tackle in the season opener against the Buffalo Bills. In Week 3 against the New York Jets, he made his first career start while Jeremiah Ratliff was enduring the effects of a concussion.

Sutton suffered an ankle injury in Week 10 of the 2016 season and was placed on injured reserve on November 15, 2016. On May 11, 2017, he was released by the Bears.

=== Minnesota Vikings ===
On May 17, 2017, Sutton signed with the Minnesota Vikings. He was released on September 2, 2017.

=== San Francisco 49ers ===
On July 25, 2018, Sutton signed with the San Francisco 49ers. He was released on August 31, 2018.

=== Arizona Hotshots ===
On September 14, Sutton was revealed as a new signing for the Arizona Hotshots of the Alliance of American Football for the 2019 season. The league ceased operations in April 2019. Sutton was credited with 15 tackles, a sack, and two pass knockdowns in 8 games.

=== Seattle Dragons ===
On October 15, 2019, Sutton was selected by the Seattle Dragons of the XFL in the 2020 XFL draft. He was named to the mid-season All-XFL team after recording 15 tackles and a sack. He had his contract terminated when the league suspended operations on April 10, 2020.
