= Avery Patterson (American football) =

American football safety

Profile
- Position: Safety

Personal information
- Born: c. 1991 (age 34–35); Pittsburg, California
- Listed height: 5 ft 10 in (1.78 m)
- Listed weight: 189 lb (86 kg)

Career information
- High school: Pittsburg (CA)
- College: Oregon (2009–2013)
- NFL draft: 2014: undrafted

Career history
- Baltimore Ravens (2014)*
- * Offseason or practice squad member only
- Stats at Pro Football Reference

Avery Patterson is an American former football player who played as a safety. He played college football at Oregon. Following his college career, he was signed as an undrafted free agent by the Baltimore Ravens on May 12, 2014. He was cut by the team on June 20, 2014, after summer camp.
