= Hroniss Grasu =

American football player (born 1991)

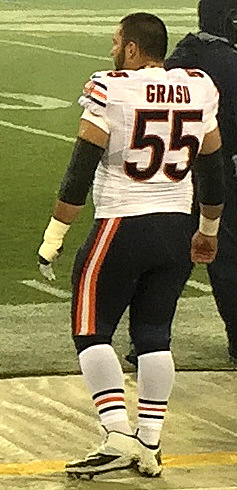
- Grasu with the Chicago Bears in 2015

Profile
- Position: Center

Personal information
- Born: August 12, 1991 (age 35); Northridge, California, U.S.
- Listed height: 6 ft 3 in (1.91 m)
- Listed weight: 300 lb (136 kg)

Career information
- High school: Crespi Carmelite (Encino, California)
- College: Oregon (2010–2014)
- NFL draft: 2015: 3rd round, 71st overall pick

Career history
- Chicago Bears (2015–2017); Baltimore Ravens (2018); Miami Dolphins (2018); Tennessee Titans (2019); Baltimore Ravens (2019); San Francisco 49ers (2020); Las Vegas Raiders (2021–2023)

Awards and highlights
- First-team All-American (2013, 2014); 3× First-team All-Pac-12 (2012–2014); Second-team All-Freshman (2011)

Career NFL statistics
- Games played: 33
- Games started: 17
- Stats at Pro Football Reference

Hroniss Grasu (/həˈroʊnɪs ˈɡrɑːsuː/ hə-ROH-niss GRAH-soo; born August 12, 1991) is an American professional football center. He played college football for the University of Oregon, and was drafted by the Chicago Bears in the third round of the 2015 NFL draft.

== Early life ==
A native of Los Angeles, California, Grasu attended Crespi Carmelite High School, where he was an All-State offensive lineman. Regarded as a three-star recruit by Rivals.com, Grasu was ranked as the No. 12 center prospect in his class.

== College career ==
As a freshman, Grasu took over as the starting center for the Oregon Ducks and remained the starter through his senior season. He earned All-Freshman Second-team in 2011, as well as All-Pac-12 Conference First-team in 2012, 2013 and 2014. He was named an All-American in 2013 and 2014. He was also a finalist for the Rimington Trophy in 2013 and 2014.

== Professional career ==
Pre-draft measurables
Height	Weight	Arm length	Hand span	Wingspan	40-yard dash	10-yard split	20-yard split	20-yard shuttle	Three-cone drill
6 ft 3 in (1.91 m)	297 lb (135 kg)	32 1/8 in (0.82 m)	10 1/4 in (0.26 m)	6 ft 5 1/2 in (1.97 m)	5.03 s	1.69 s	2.82 s	4.20 s	7.84 s
All values from NFL Combine/Pro Day

=== Chicago Bears ===
Grasu was selected by the Chicago Bears in the third round (71st pick overall) of the 2015 NFL draft. The move reunited him with college teammate Kyle Long.

On August 30, 2016, Grasu was placed on injured reserve.

On September 2, 2018, Grasu was released by the Bears.

=== Baltimore Ravens (first stint) ===
On September 24, 2018, Grasu was signed by the Baltimore Ravens. He played in three games before being released on November 24, 2018.

=== Miami Dolphins ===
On December 12, 2018, Grasu was signed by the Miami Dolphins, but was released nine days later.

=== Tennessee Titans ===
On February 7, 2019, Grasu was signed by the Tennessee Titans, reuniting with college teammate Marcus Mariota. He was released on August 31, 2019. He was re-signed on September 10, 2019. He was released again on October 8, 2019. He was signed once again on October 31, 2019. He was released on December 3, 2019.

=== Baltimore Ravens (second stint) ===
On December 4, 2019, Grasu was claimed off waivers by the Ravens.

=== San Francisco 49ers ===
On August 20, 2020, Grasu signed with the San Francisco 49ers. He was released on September 5, 2020, and signed to the practice squad the next day. After being elevated to the active roster for the team's first two games, Grasu was promoted to the active roster on September 26, 2020. He was placed on the team's reserve/COVID-19 list by the team on November 19, 2020, and activated on November 25. He was placed back on the COVID-19 list on December 28, 2020, and activated on January 14, 2021.

=== Las Vegas Raiders ===
On October 25, 2021, Grasu was signed to the Las Vegas Raiders practice squad. After the Raiders were eliminated in the 2021 Wild Card round of the playoffs, he signed a reserve/future contract on January 17, 2022.

On August 30, 2022, Grasu was waived by the Raiders and signed to the practice squad the next day. He was promoted to the active roster on December 10.

On August 29, 2023, Grasu was released by the Raiders and re-signed to the practice squad. He was signed to the active roster on December 21.

== Personal life ==
Grasu is of Romanian descent. His parents, Ștefan and Mariana Grasu, emigrated from Romania to Los Angeles in 1982 and opened Greco's New York Pizzeria on Hollywood Boulevard. His older brother, Nico, was a placekicker for Washington State (2008–10).

Grasu was roommates with Bryan Bennett, Oregon's former backup quarterback and a former teammate of Grasu at Crespi.

His selection with the 71st overall pick in the draft by the Bears was portrayed in the season 7 premiere of The League on FX.

Grasu married New York Liberty guard Sabrina Ionescu in March 2024.
