= Ifo Ekpre-Olomu =

American football player (born 1993)

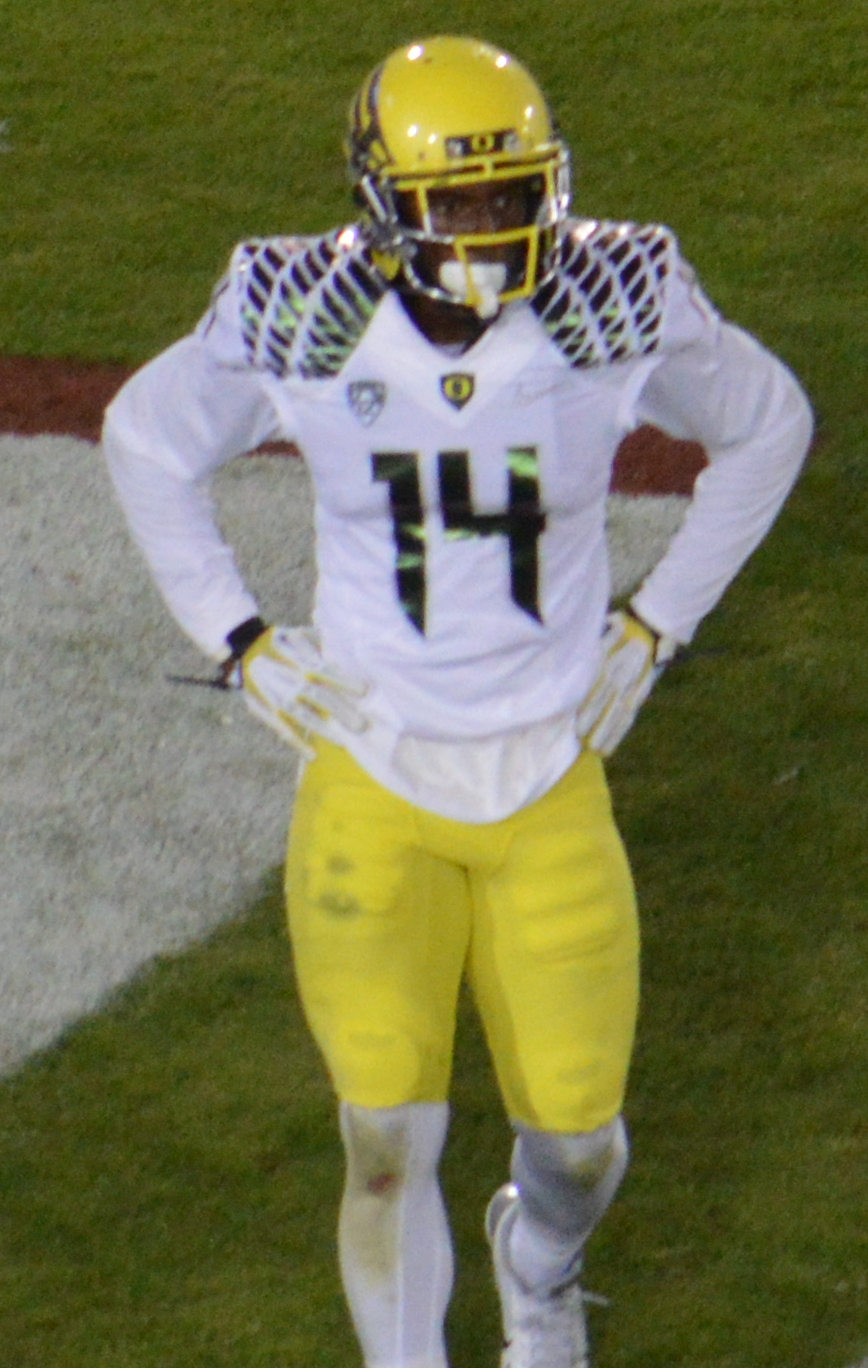
- Ekpre-Olomu with the Oregon Ducks in 2013

No. 25, 33
- Position: Cornerback

Personal information
- Born: July 10, 1993 (age 33); Chino, California, U.S.
- Listed height: 5 ft 9 in (1.75 m)
- Listed weight: 200 lb (91 kg)

Career information
- High school: Chino Hills (Chino Hills, California)
- College: Oregon (2011–2014)
- NFL draft: 2015: 7th round, 241st overall pick

Career history
- Cleveland Browns (2015); Miami Dolphins (2016)

Awards and highlights
- Consensus All-American (2014); 3× First-team All-Pac-12 (2012–2014)
- Stats at Pro Football Reference

Ifomeno Ekpre-Olomu (/ˈiːfoʊ ˌɛkpreɪ ˈoʊloʊmuː/ EE-foh EK-pray OH-loh-moo; born July 10, 1993) is an American former professional football player who was a cornerback in the National Football League (NFL). He played college football for the Oregon Ducks and was selected by the Cleveland Browns in the seventh round of the 2015 NFL draft.

== Early life ==
Ekpre-Olomu, who is of Nigerian descent, attended Chino Hills High School in Chino Hills, California and played both running back and defensive back. He was named to the 2010 California All-State Defensive first-team, All-Southern Section Defensive first-team and was the Sierra League MVP.

Considered a four-star recruit by Rivals.com, Ekpre-Olomu was listed as the No. 17 cornerback in the nation in 2011.

== College career ==
Over the course of three seasons at Oregon, Ekpre-Olomu helped the Ducks to a 35–5 record with three consecutive post-season bowl victories. He was praised by Duck's longtime secondary coach John Neal as, "(...) the best player I've ever coached.” Despite being projected as a late first-round draft selection in the 2014 NFL draft, Ekpre-Olomu decided to return for his senior season at the University of Oregon to complete his degree in general social science.

As a true freshman in 2011, Ekpre-Olomu played in all 14 games while recording 34 tackles for the Ducks.

He was named first-team All-Pac-12 Conference and third-team All-American by the Associated Press as a sophomore in 2012 after starting 13 games and recording 59 tackles with four interceptions.

As a junior in 2013, Ekpre-Olomu was named first-team All-Pac-12 for the second consecutive year while also earning first-team all-America status from ESPN and was a second-team all-America according to no less than four organizations, including the prestigious Walter Camp Football Foundation. Starting in all 13 games, he recorded 84 tackles with three interceptions.

The 2014 season featured #3 Oregon against #7 Michigan State in a highly anticipated game considered to be the best non-conference match-up of the season. Oregon's win over #7 Michigan State was sealed after a game-changing interception by Ekpre-Olomu. Later in the year, Ekpre-Olomu sustained a knee injury which ended his season prior to the 2015 Rose Bowl, in which Oregon received the second seed for the new College Football Playoff. Phil Steele called Ekpre-Olomu the best cornerback in the NCAA.

== Professional career ==
=== Pre-draft ===
NFL draft expert Mel Kiper Jr. of ESPN rated Ekpre-Olomu as the top senior cornerback available in the 2015 NFL draft. However, an anterior cruciate ligament injury (ACL) he suffered in December 2014 during practice left many teams no longer interested in him. Ekpre-Olomu later revealed that he had also dislocated his knee. He underwent two major reconstructive surgeries, with his ACL reconstruction being much more extensive than usual. An insurance policy taken out by his family through International Specialty Insurance disability insurance program paid him $3 million.

=== Cleveland Browns ===
Ekpre-Olomu was selected by the Cleveland Browns in the seventh round of the 2015 NFL draft. He was the 241st player picked overall. His injury meant that he fell at least four rounds during the draft. On May 13, 2015, Ekpre-Olomu signed a four-year, $2.337 million with the Browns. His contract includes a $57,300 signing bonus. On July 28, 2015, the Browns said he would sit out the entire 2015 season so that he could continue to recover from his knee surgery. Head coach Mike Pettine said the team knew Ekpre-Olomu was unlikely to play when they drafted him. Ekpre-Olomu was waived by the Browns on April 2, 2016.

=== Miami Dolphins ===
On April 5, 2016, Ekpre-Olomu was claimed off waivers by the Miami Dolphins. The Dolphins waived him on August 7, 2016 and placed him on injured reserve after he injured his other knee. On February 16, 2017, Ekpre-Olomu was released by the Dolphins.

== Personal life ==
His parents Joshua and Queen Ekpre-Olomu are Nigerian, and his birth name of Ifomeno means "something that fits you well."
