= Teo Redding =

American football player (born 1994)

No. 9 – Orlando Pirates
- Position: Wide receiver
- Roster status: Active

Personal information
- Born: December 8, 1994 (age 31); Warren, Michigan, U.S.
- Listed height: 6 ft 3 in (1.91 m)
- Listed weight: 190 lb (86 kg)

Career information
- High school: Michigan Collegiate
- College: Bowling Green
- NFL draft: 2018: undrafted

Career history
- Detroit Lions (2018)*; Washington Redskins (2018)*; Green Bay Packers (2018–2019)*; New York Guardians (2020); Montreal Alouettes (2021); Massachusetts Pirates (2022); Houston Gamblers (2022–2023); Massachusetts / Orlando Pirates (2024–present)
- * Offseason or practice squad member only

Awards and highlights
- Second-team All-MAC (2017)
- Stats at Pro Football Reference

Teo Redding (born December 8, 1994) is an American professional football wide receiver for the Orlando Pirates of the Indoor Football League (IFL). He attended Michigan Collegiate High School. He played college football for the Bowling Green Falcons and was originally signed by the Detroit Lions as an undrafted free agent in 2018. He has also been a member of the Washington Redskins, Green Bay Packers, New York Guardians, and Montreal Alouettes.

== College career ==
=== Bowling Green ===
As a redshirt freshman for the Bowling Green Falcons football team in 2014, Redding caught five passes for 59 yards in limited action. In 2015, he played in all 14 games and earned his first collegiate start in the 2015 GoDaddy Bowl. On the season, he had 13 receptions for 222 yards and three touchdowns while the Falcons won the 2015 MAC Championship. As a redshirt senior in 2017, Redding caught a career high eight passes for 197 yards and two touchdowns against Miami (OH) in a 37-29 victory. He finished his senior season with 45 receptions for 624 yards and led the Falcons with eight touchdowns, earning him Second-team All-MAC.

=== College statistics ===
Season	Team	Games		Receiving			
Season	Team	GP	GS	Rec	Yds	Avg	TD
2013	Bowling Green	Redshirt (redshirt)					
2014	Bowling Green	7	0	5	59	11.8	0
2015	Bowling Green	14	1	13	222	17.1	3
2016	Bowling Green	12	8	31	423	13.6	3
2017	Bowling Green	11	10	45	624	13.9	8
Career		44	19	94	1,328	14.1	14

== Professional career ==
Pre-draft measurables
Height	Weight	Arm length	Hand span	40-yard dash	10-yard split	20-yard split	20-yard shuttle	Three-cone drill	Vertical jump	Broad jump	Bench press
6 ft 1 in (1.85 m)	181 lb (82 kg)	32 5/8 in (0.83 m)	9 3/8 in (0.24 m)	4.46 s	1.59 s	2.58 s	4.22 s	6.85 s	38 1/2 in (0.98 m)	11 ft 0 in (3.35 m)	10 reps
All values from Pro Day

=== Detroit Lions ===
Redding signed with the Detroit Lions as an undrafted free agent on May 11, 2018. He was waived on August 31, 2018.

=== Washington Redskins ===
On September 11, 2018, Redding signed with the Washington Redskins' practice squad, but was waived on September 18.

=== Green Bay Packers ===
On November 20, 2018, Redding was signed to the Green Bay Packers practice squad. He signed a reserve/future contract with the Packers on December 31, 2018. He was released on August 31, 2019.

=== New York Guardians ===
Redding was signed by the New York Guardians of the XFL on December 23, 2019. He had his contract terminated when the league suspended operations on April 10, 2020.

=== Montreal Alouettes ===
Redding signed with the Montreal Alouettes of the CFL on December 18, 2020.

=== Massachusetts Pirates (first stint) ===
In 2022, Redding signed with the Massachusetts Pirates of the Indoor Football League (IFL). In a Week 1 game against the Frisco Fighters, Redding had three receptions for 17 yards. He was then selected for the USFL supplemental draft.

=== Houston Gamblers / Roughnecks ===
On March 10, 2022, Redding was selected by the Houston Gamblers of the United States Football League in the 2022 USFL supplemental draft. He was transferred to the team's practice squad before the start of the regular season on April 16, 2022, and remained on the inactive roster on April 22. He was transferred to the active roster on April 30. He was ruled inactive for the team's game against the New Orleans Breakers on May 8, 2022, and moved back to the active roster on May 14. He was re-signed on December 23, 2023.

Redding and all other Houston Gamblers players and coaches were all transferred to the Houston Roughnecks after it was announced that the Gamblers took on the identity of their XFL counterpart, the Roughnecks. He was released on March 10, 2024.

=== Massachusetts Pirates (second stint) ===
On March 15, 2024, Redding signed with the Pirates again. He re-signed with the team on December 10, 2025.

== Career statistics ==
=== Outdoor ===
Regular season

Year	Team	League	Games		Receiving			
Year	Team	League	GP	GS	Rec	Yds	Avg	TD
2020	NY	XFL	5	1	8	102	12.7	0
2022	HOU	USFL	7	6	17	249	14.6	1
2023	HOU	USFL	10	10	13	156	12.0	0
Career			22	17	38	507	13.3	1

=== Indoor ===
Through Week 5 of the 2026 season

Year	Team	League	Games	Receiving				Rushing				Kick returns			
Year	Team	League	GP	Rec	Yds	Avg	TD	Att	Yds	Avg	TD	Att	Yds	Avg	TD
2022	MASS	IFL	1	3	17	5.6	0	—	—	—	—	—	—	—	—
2024	MASS	IFL	19	61	729	12.0	15	—	—	—	—	1	0	0.0	0
2025	MASS	IFL	15	52	634	12.2	15	12	39	3.3	1	2	27	13.5	0
2026	ORL	IFL	5	25	278	11.1	4	2	6	3.0	1	—	—	—	—
Career			40	141	1,658	11.8	30	14	45	3.2	2	3	27	9.0	0
