= 2014 Bowling Green Falcons football team =

American college football season

2014 Bowling Green Falcons football

MAC East Division champion Camellia Bowl champion

MAC Championship Game, L 17–51 vs. Northern Illinois

Camellia Bowl, W 33–28 vs. South Alabama
- Conference: Mid-American Conference
- East Division
- Record: 8–6 (5–3 MAC)
- Head coach: Dino Babers (1st season)
- Offensive coordinator: Sterlin Gilbert (1st season)
- Offensive scheme: Veer and shoot
- Defensive coordinator: Kim McCloud (1st season)
- Base defense: 4–3
- Home stadium: Doyt Perry Stadium

2014 Mid-American Conference football standings
| | Conf. | | | Overall |
| Team | W | | L | W | | L |
|---|---|---|---|---|---|---|
East Division
| Bowling Green x | 5 | – | 3 | 8 | – | 6 |
| Ohio | 4 | – | 4 | 6 | – | 6 |
| Buffalo | 3 | – | 4 | 5 | – | 6 |
| Akron | 3 | – | 5 | 5 | – | 7 |
| UMass | 3 | – | 5 | 3 | – | 9 |
| Miami (OH) | 2 | – | 6 | 2 | – | 10 |
| Kent State | 1 | – | 6 | 2 | – | 9 |
West Division
| Northern Illinois xy$ | 7 | – | 1 | 11 | – | 3 |
| Toledo x | 7 | – | 1 | 9 | – | 4 |
| Western Michigan | 6 | – | 2 | 8 | – | 5 |
| Central Michigan | 5 | – | 3 | 7 | – | 6 |
| Ball State | 4 | – | 4 | 5 | – | 7 |
| Eastern Michigan | 1 | – | 7 | 2 | – | 10 |
Championship: Northern Illinois 51, Bowling Green 17
$ – Conference champion; x – Division champion/co-champions; y – Championship game participant

The 2014 Bowling Green Falcons football team represented Bowling Green State University in the 2014 NCAA Division I FBS football season. The Falcons played their home games at Doyt Perry Stadium. They were led by first year head coach Dino Babers and were members of the East Division of the Mid-American Conference. They finished the season 8–6, 5–3 in MAC play be champions of the East Division and qualify for the MAC Championship Game where they lost to West Division champion Northern Illinois. They were invited to the inaugural Camellia Bowl where they defeated South Alabama.

== Schedule ==
| Date | Time | Opponent | Site | TV | Result | Attendance |
|---|---|---|---|---|---|---|
| August 29 | 7:30 pm | at Western Kentucky* | Houchens Industries–L. T. Smith Stadium; Bowling Green, KY | CBSSN | L 31–59 | 17,215 |
| September 6 | 3:30 pm | VMI* | Doyt Perry Stadium; Bowling Green, OH | ESPN3 | W 48–7 | 18,311 |
| September 13 | 12:00 pm | Indiana* | Doyt Perry Stadium; Bowling Green, OH | ESPNU | W 45–42 | 23,717 |
| September 20 | 12:00 pm | at No. 19 Wisconsin* | Camp Randall Stadium; Madison, WI | ESPN2 | L 17–68 | 79,849 |
| September 27 | 3:00 pm | at Massachusetts | Warren McGuirk Alumni Stadium; Hadley, MA | ESPN3 | W 47–42 | 17,000 |
| October 4 | 3:30 pm | Buffalo^{†} | Doyt Perry Stadium; Bowling Green, OH | ESPN3 | W 36–35 | 17,185 |
| October 11 | 2:00 pm | at Ohio | Peden Stadium; Athens, OH | ESPN3 | W 31–13 | 24,311 |
| October 18 | 2:00 pm | Western Michigan | Doyt Perry Stadium; Bowling Green, OH | ESPN3 | L 14–26 | 15,201 |
| November 4 | 8:00 pm | at Akron | InfoCision Stadium; Akron, OH | ESPN2 | W 27–10 | 10,348 |
| November 12 | 8:00 pm | Kent State | Doyt Perry Stadium; Bowling Green, OH (Anniversary Award) | ESPN2 | W 30–20 | 8,417 |
| November 19 | 8:00 pm | at Toledo | Glass Bowl; Toledo, OH (Battle of I-75 Trophy) | ESPN2 | L 20–27 | 17,486 |
| November 28 | 1:00 pm | Ball State | Doyt Perry Stadium; Bowling Green, OH | ESPN3 | L 24–41 | 8,534 |
| December 5 | 7:00 pm | vs. Northern Illinois | Ford Field; Detroit, MI (MAC Championship Game) | ESPN2 | L 17–51 | 15,110 |
| December 20 | 9:15 pm | vs. South Alabama* | Cramton Bowl; Montgomery, AL (Camellia Bowl) | ESPN | W 33–28 | 20,256 |
*Non-conference game; ^{†}Homecoming; Rankings from AP Poll released prior to the game; All times are in Eastern time

== Game summaries ==
=== At Western Kentucky Hilltoppers ===
Bowling Green Falcons (0–0) at Western Kentucky Hilltoppers (0–0) – Game summary

| Quarter | 1 | 2 | 3 | 4 | Total |
|---|---|---|---|---|---|
| Falcons | 0 | 10 | 14 | 7 | 31 |
| Hilltoppers | 14 | 17 | 14 | 14 | 59 |

at Houchens Industries–L. T. Smith Stadium • Bowling Green, Kentucky

- Date: August 29, 2014
- Game time: 7:00 p.m. EDT
- Game weather: 88 °F (31 °C)
- Game attendance: 17,215
- Referee: Brad Rogers
- TV announcers (CBSSN): Ben Holden (play-by-play), Kevin O'Connell (analyst) and Courtney Fallon (sidelines)

Game information

First quarter

- (10:12) WKU – Leon Allen 2-yard run (Garrett Schwettman kick) (Drive: 10 plays, 83 yards, 3:20; Western Kentucky 7-0)
- (02:29) WKU – Taywan Taylor 55-yard pass from Brandon Doughty (Garrett Schwettman kick) (Drive: 8 plays, 88 yards, 2:12; Western Kentucky 14-0)

Second quarter

- (08:36) WKU – Antwane Grant 34-yard pass from Brandon Doughty (Garrett Schwettman kick) (Drive: 8 plays, 80 yards, 2:32; Western Kentucky 21-0)
- (06:54) BGSU – Fred Coppet 1-yard run (Tyler Tate kick) (Drive: 7 plays, 70 yards, 1:42; Western Kentucky 21-7)
- (04:41) WKU – Willie McNeal 9-yard pass from Brandon Doughty (Garrett Schwettman kick) (Drive: 6 plays, 75 yards, 2:13; Western Kentucky 28-7)
- (02:50) BGSU – Tyler Tate 52-yard field goal (Drive: 6 plays, 38 yards, 1:51; Western Kentucky 28-10)
- (00:00) WKU – Garrett Schwettman 29-yard field goal (Drive: 10 plays, 63 yards, 2:50; Western Kentucky 31-10)

Third quarter

- (11:24) WKU – Jared Dangerfield 5-yard pass from Brandon Doughty (Garrett Schwettman kick) (Drive: 10 plays, 69 yards, 3:36; Western Kentucky 38-10)
- (08:54) BGSU – Andre Givens 1-yard run (Tyler Tate kick) (Drive: 8 plays, 75 yards, 2:30; Western Kentucky 38-17)
- (07:16) BGSU – Ronnie Moore 41-yard pass from Matt Johnson (Tyler Tate kick) (Drive: 2 plays, 51 yards, :39; Western Kentucky 38-24)
- (04:23) WKU – Willie McNeal 20-yard pass from Brandon Doughty (Garrett Schwettman kick) (Drive: 8 plays, 77 yards, 2:53; Western Kentucky 45-24)

Fourth quarter

- (13:29) WKU – Jared Dangerfield 5-yard pass from Brandon Doughty (Garrett Schwettman kick) (Drive: 11 plays, 77 yards, 4:08; Western Kentucky 52-24)
- (10:52) BGSU – Travis Greene 8-yard run (Tyler Tate kick) (Drive: 9 plays, 69 yards, 2:37; Western Kentucky 52-31)
- (02:55) WKU – Anthony Wales 1-yard run (Garrett Schwettman kick) (Drive: 15 plays, 75 yards, 7:57; Western Kentucky 59-31)

| Statistics | Bowling Green | Western Kentucky |
|---|---|---|
| First downs | 26 | 40 |
| Plays–yards | 71–465 | 96–708 |
| Rushes–yards | 35–142 | 40–139 |
| Passing yards | 313 | 569 |
| Passing: comp–att–int | 25–36–0 | 46–56–0 |
| Turnovers | 0 | 0 |
| Time of possession | 24:01 | 35:59 |

| Team | Category | Player | Statistics |
|---|---|---|---|
| Bowling Green | Passing | Matt Johnson | 25–36, 313 yards, TD |
| Bowling Green | Rushing | Travis Greene | 18 carries, 91 yards, TD |
| Bowling Green | Receiving | Roger Lewis | 8 receptions, 77 yards |
| Western Kentucky | Passing | Brandon Doughty | 46–56, 569 yards, 6 TDs |
| Western Kentucky | Rushing | Leon Allen | 27 carries, 99 yards, TD |
| Western Kentucky | Receiving | Taywan Taylor | 12 receptions, 185 yards, TD |

Dino Babers and Jeff Brohm both made their coaching debut for their respective programs. Bowling Green Quarterback Matt Johnson suffered a broken hip and missed the remainder of the season.

=== vs VMI Keydets ===
VMI Keydets (0–1) vs Bowling Green Falcons (0–1) – Game summary

| Quarter | 1 | 2 | 3 | 4 | Total |
|---|---|---|---|---|---|
| Keydets | 0 | 7 | 0 | 0 | 7 |
| Falcons | 14 | 20 | 7 | 7 | 48 |

at Doyt Perry Stadium • Bowling Green, Ohio

- Date: September 6, 2014
- Game time: 3:30 p.m. EDT
- Game weather: 73 °F (23 °C)
- Game attendance: 18,311
- Referee: Jeff Servinski
- TV announcers (ESPN3): Dan Gutowski (play-by-play) and Dustin Fox (analyst)

Game information

First quarter

- (10:22) BGSU – James Knapke 1-yard run (Tyler Tate kick) (Drive: 8 plays, 71 yards, 2:09; Bowling Green 7-0)
- (03:33) BGSU – Ryan Burbrink 75-yard punt return (Tyler Tate kick) (Bowling Green 14-0)

Second quarter

- (14:16) BGSU – Fred Coppet 15-yard run (Tyler Tate kick) (Drive: 8 plays, 86 yards, 1:50; Bowling Green 21-0)
- (11:16) BGSU – Travis Greene 21-yard run (Tyler Tate kick) (Drive: 6 plays, 88 yards, 1:21; Bowling Green 28-0)
- (08:29) VMI – Hayden Alford 1-yard run (Dillon Christopher kick) (Drive: 6 plays, 69 yards, 2:40; Bowling Green 28-7)
- (02:46) BGSU – Travis Greene 7-yard run (Tyler Tate kick failed) (Drive: 3 plays, 49 yards, :40; Bowling Green 34-7)

Third quarter

- (10:47) BGSU – Herve Coby 14-yard blocked punt run (Tyler Tate kick) (Bowling Green 41-7)

Fourth quarter

- (08:45) BGSU – Roger Lewis 51-yard pass from James Knapke (Tyler Tate kick) (Drive: 10 plays, 86 yards, 3:29; Bowling Green 48-7)

| Statistics | VMI | Bowling Green |
|---|---|---|
| First downs | 24 | 26 |
| Plays–yards | 90–418 | 71–526 |
| Rushes–yards | 35–97 | 37–260 |
| Passing yards | 321 | 266 |
| Passing: comp–att–int | 30–55–1 | 25–34–1 |
| Turnovers | 3 | 2 |
| Time of possession | 39:07 | 20:53 |

| Team | Category | Player | Statistics |
|---|---|---|---|
| VMI | Passing | Al Cobb | 26–43, 224 yards, INT |
| VMI | Rushing | Jabari Turner | 13 carries, 43 yards |
| VMI | Receiving | Doug Burton | 5 receptions, 86 yards |
| Bowling Green | Passing | James Knapke | 22–31, 237 yards, TD, INT |
| Bowling Green | Rushing | Travis Greene | 18 carries, 129 yards, 2 TDs |
| Bowling Green | Receiving | Roger Lewis | 6 receptions, 140 yards, TD |

=== vs Indiana Hoosiers ===
Indiana Hoosiers (1–0) vs Bowling Green Falcons (1–1) – Game summary

| Quarter | 1 | 2 | 3 | 4 | Total |
|---|---|---|---|---|---|
| Hoosiers | 7 | 7 | 14 | 14 | 42 |
| Falcons | 3 | 9 | 14 | 19 | 45 |

at Doyt Perry Stadium • Bowling Green, Ohio

- Date: September 13, 2014
- Game time: 12:00 p.m. EDT
- Game weather: 57 °F (14 °C)
- Game attendance: 23,717
- Referee: Shawn Smith
- TV announcers (ESPNU): Mark Neely (play-by-play) and David Diaz-Infante (analyst)

Game information

First quarter

- (10:39) BGSU – Tyler Tate 28-yard field goal (Drive: 14 plays, 50 yards, 4:21; Bowling Green 3-0)
- (03:23) IU – Nate Sudfeld 1-yard run (Aaron Del Grosso kick) (Drive: 3 plays, 33 yards, 1:05; Indiana 7-3)

Second quarter

- (14:56) IU – J-Shun Harris II 22-yard pass from Nate Sudfeld (Aaron Del Grosso kick) (Drive: 7 plays, 79 yards, 1:39; Indiana 14-3)
- (12:45) BGSU – Tyler Tate 38-yard field goal (Drive: 10 plays, 56 yards, 2:11; Indiana 14-6)
- (08:48) BGSU – Tyler Tate 45-yard field goal (Drive: 8 plays, 16 yards, 2:07; Indiana 14-9)
- (04:31) BGSU – Tyler Tate 47-yard field goal (Drive: 7 plays, 29 yards, 2:20; Indiana 14-12)

Third quarter

- (08:52) BGSU – Ronnie Moore 40-yard pass from James Knapke (Tyler Tate kick) (Drive: 10 plays, 78 yards, 2:35; Bowling Green 19-14)
- (08:11) IU – Tevin Coleman 28-yard run (Aaron Del Grosso kick) (Drive: 3 plays, 42 yards, :41; Indiana 21-19)
- (03:47) BGSU – Travis Greene 5-yard run (Tyler Tate kick) (Drive: 10 plays, 75 yards, 2:39; Bowling Green 26-21)
- (02:51) IU – Tevin Coleman 46-yard run (Aaron Del Grosso kick) (Drive: 3 plays, 75 yards, :56; Indiana 28-26)

Fourth quarter

- (14:08) BGSU – Fred Coppet 1-yard run (James Knapke pass failed) (Drive: 11 plays, 77 yards, 3:43; Bowling Green 32-28)
- (12:52) IU – Tevin Coleman 31-yard run (Aaron Del Grosso kick) (Drive: 4 plays, 61 yards, 1:16; Indiana 35-32)
- (05:24) BGSU – Ryan Burbrink 31-yard pass from James Knapke (Tyler Tate kick) (Drive: 10 plays, 88 yards, 3:40; Bowling Green 39-35)
- (02:04) IU – Nate Sudfeld 1-yard run (Aaron Del Grosso kick) (Drive: 9 plays, 67 yards, 3:20; Indiana 42-39)
- (00:09) BGSU – Roger Lewis 2-yard pass from James Knapke (Tyler Tate kick blocked) (Drive: 11 plays, 88 yards, 1:55; Bowling Green 45-42)

| Statistics | Indiana | Bowling Green |
|---|---|---|
| First downs | 30 | 39 |
| Plays–yards | 78–582 | 113–571 |
| Rushes–yards | 37–235 | 40–176 |
| Passing yards | 347 | 395 |
| Passing: comp–att–int | 31–41–0 | 46–73–1 |
| Turnovers | 1 | 2 |
| Time of possession | 28:40 | 31:20 |

| Team | Category | Player | Statistics |
|---|---|---|---|
| Indiana | Passing | Nate Sudfeld | 31–41, 347 yards, TD |
| Indiana | Rushing | Tevin Coleman | 24 carries, 190 yards, 3 TDs |
| Indiana | Receiving | Shane Wynn | 10 receptions, 139 yards |
| Bowling Green | Passing | James Knapke | 46–73, 395 yards, 3 TDs, INT |
| Bowling Green | Rushing | Travis Greene | 24 carries, 123 yards, TD |
| Bowling Green | Receiving | Roger Lewis | 16 receptions, 149 yards, TD |

Bowling Green had not hosted a Big Ten team at Doyt Perry Stadium since 2008. The Falcons set a school record 113 plays from scrimmage in front of 23,717 fans. Quarterback James Knapke threw for 46 completions in 73 attempts. Both marks were also school records in just his second collegiate start. The victory against Indiana was Bowling Green's first against a Power Five conference team since 2008 at Pittsburgh.

=== At Wisconsin Badgers ===
Bowling Green Falcons (2–1) at No. 19 Wisconsin Badgers (1–1) – Game summary

| Quarter | 1 | 2 | 3 | 4 | Total |
|---|---|---|---|---|---|
| Falcons | 10 | 0 | 0 | 7 | 17 |
| Badgers | 14 | 27 | 21 | 6 | 68 |

at Camp Randall Stadium • Madison, Wisconsin

- Date: September 13, 2014
- Game time: 12:00 p.m. EDT
- Game weather: 69 °F (21 °C)
- Game attendance: 79,849
- Referee: Michael Cannon
- TV announcers (ESPN2): Beth Mowins (play-by-play), Joey Galloway (analyst) and Paul Carcaterra (sidelines)

Game information

First quarter

- (13:49) WIS – Tanner McEvoy 24-yard run (Rafael Gaglianone kick) (Drive: 2 plays, 24 yards, :12; Wisconsin 7-0)
- (11:33) BGSU – Fred Coppet 35-yard run (Tyler Tate kick) (Drive: 1 play, 35 yards, :08; Tied 7-7)
- (06:28) WIS – Melvin Gordon 2-yard run (Rafael Gaglianone kick) (Drive: 11 plays, 70 yards, 5:05; Wisconsin 14-7)
- (01:01) BGSU – Tyler Tate 28-yard field goal (Drive: 9 plays, 52 yards, 2:06; Wisconsin 14-10)

Second quarter

- (14:27) WIS – Sam Arneson 34-yard pass from Tanner McEvoy (Rafael Gaglianone kick) (Drive: 1 play, 34 yards, :08; Wisconsin 21-10)
- (11:18) WIS – Melvin Gordon 50-yard run (Rafael Gaglianone kick failed) (Drive: 3 plays, 57 yards, :58; Wisconsin 27-10)
- (05:18) WIS – Melvin Gordon 3-yard run (Rafael Gaglianone kick) (Drive: 11 plays, 57 yards, 4:41; Wisconsin 34-10)
- (00:18) WIS – Melvin Gordon 21-yard run (Rafael Gaglianone kick) (Drive: 6 plays, 68 yards, 1:26; Wisconsin 41-10)

Third quarter

- (14:27) WIS – Melvin Gordon 69-yard run (Rafael Gaglianone kick) (Drive: 2 plays, 75 yards, :46; Wisconsin 48-10)
- (10:28) WIS – Corey Clement 13-yard run (Rafael Gaglianone kick) (Drive: 4 plays, 87 yards, 2:01; Wisconsin 55-10)
- (04:40) WIS – Corey Clement 1-yard run (Rafael Gaglianone kick) (Drive: 6 plays, 61 yards, 3:11; Wisconsin 62-10)

Fourth quarter

- (12:54) WIS – Rafael Gaglianone 28-yard field goal (Drive: 10 plays, 63 yards, 5:04; Wisconsin 65-10)
- (11:37) BGSU – Andre Givens 35-yard run (Tyler Tate kick) (Drive: 4 plays, 75 yards, 1:17; Wisconsin 65-17)
- (03:30) WIS – Rafael Gaglianone 43-yard field goal (Drive: 6 plays, 23 yards, 3:19; Wisconsin 68-17)

| Statistics | Bowling Green | Wisconsin |
|---|---|---|
| First downs | 11 | 29 |
| Plays–yards | 62–271 | 78–756 |
| Rushes–yards | 29–93 | 60–644 |
| Passing yards | 178 | 112 |
| Passing: comp–att–int | 15–33–1 | 9–18–1 |
| Turnovers | 2 | 3 |
| Time of possession | 23:24 | 36:36 |

| Team | Category | Player | Statistics |
|---|---|---|---|
| Bowling Green | Passing | James Knapke | 13–28, 163 yards, INT |
| Bowling Green | Rushing | Andre Givens | 5 carries, 67 yards, TD |
| Bowling Green | Receiving | Roger Lewis | 5 receptions, 68 yards |
| Wisconsin | Passing | Tanner McEvoy | 9–16, 112 yards, TD, INT |
| Wisconsin | Rushing | Melvin Gordon | 13 carries, 253 yards, 5 TDs |
| Wisconsin | Receiving | Sam Arneson | 3 receptions, 63 yards, TD |

=== At Massachusetts ===
Bowling Green Falcons (2–2) at UMass Minutemen (0–4) – Game summary

| Quarter | 1 | 2 | 3 | 4 | Total |
|---|---|---|---|---|---|
| Falcons | 10 | 16 | 7 | 14 | 47 |
| Minutemen | 7 | 14 | 14 | 7 | 42 |

at Warren McGuirk Alumni Stadium • Hadley, Massachusetts

- Date: September 27, 2014
- Game time: 3:00 p.m. EDT
- Game weather: 80 °F (27 °C)
- Game attendance: 17,000
- Referee: Larry Smith
- TV announcers (ESPN3): Bob Picozzi (play-by-play) and Matt Chatham (analyst)

Game information

First quarter

- (10:50) UMASS – Jalen Williams 60-yard pass from Blake Frohnapfel (Blake Lucas kick) (Drive: 1 play, 60 yards, :09; Massachusetts 7-0)
- (04:02) BGSU – Tyler Tate 21-yard field goal (Drive: 12 plays, 65 yards, 3:39; Massachusetts 7-3)
- (02:57) BGSU – Ronnie Moore 27-yard pass from James Knapke (Tyler Tate kick) (Drive: 3 plays, 33 yards, :37; Bowling Green 10-7)

Second quarter

- (14:50) BGSU – Tyler Tate 33-yard field goal (Drive: 8 plays, 53 yards, 1:47; Bowling Green 13-7)
- (11:55) UMASS – Rodney Mills 32-yard pass from Blake Frohnapfel (Blake Lucas kick) (Drive: 8 plays, 80 yards, 2:55; Massachusetts 14-13)
- (09:47) BGSU – Travis Greene 4-yard run (Tyler Tate kick) (Drive: 10 plays, 87 yards, 2:08; Bowling Green 20-14)
- (06:48) UMASS – Shadrach Abrokwah 4-yard run (Blake Lucas kick) (Drive: 7 plays, 76 yards, 2:59; Massachusetts 21-20)
- (05:00) BGSU – Ryan Burbrink 35-yard pass from James Knapke (Tyler Tate kick blocked) (Drive: 8 plays, 73 yards, 1:48; Bowling Green 26-21)

Third quarter

- (08:50) BGSU – Roger Lewis 52-yard pass from James Knapke (Tyler Tate kick) (Drive: 7 plays, 96 yards, 1:20; Bowling Green 33-21)
- (08:34) UMASS – Alex Kenney 80-yard pass from Blake Frohnapfel (Blake Lucas kick) (Drive: 1 play, 80 yards, :16; Bowling Green 33-28)
- (07:25) UMASS – Tajae Sharpe 18-yard pass from Blake Frohnapfel (Blake Lucas kick) (Drive: 3 plays, 30 yards, :41; Massachusetts 35-33)

Fourth quarter

- (12:55) BGSU – Travis Greene 25-yard run (Tyler Tate kick) (Drive: 6 plays, 45 yards, 1:56; Bowling Green 40-35)
- (09:38) BGSU – Ronnie Moore 22-yard run (Tyler Tate kick) (Drive: 6 plays, 54 yards, 1:57; Bowling Green 47-35)
- (03:22) UMASS – Tajae Sharpe 5-yard pass from Blake Frohnapfel (Blake Lucas kick) (Drive: 7 plays, 68 yards, 1:20; Bowling Green 47-42)

| Statistics | Bowling Green | UMass |
|---|---|---|
| First downs | 30 | 29 |
| Plays–yards | 108–668 | 92–589 |
| Rushes–yards | 48–225 | 31–49 |
| Passing yards | 178 | 112 |
| Passing: comp–att–int | 38–60–3 | 36–61–1 |
| Turnovers | 3 | 4 |
| Time of possession | 31:11 | 28:49 |

| Team | Category | Player | Statistics |
|---|---|---|---|
| Bowling Green | Passing | James Knapke | 38–59, 443 yards, 3 TDs, 3 INTs |
| Bowling Green | Rushing | Travis Greene | 20 carries, 110 yards, 2 TDs |
| Bowling Green | Receiving | Roger Lewis | 9 receptions, 148 yards, TD |
| UMass | Passing | Blake Frohnapfel | 36–61, 589 yards, 5 TDs, INT |
| UMass | Rushing | Shadrach Abrokwah | 14 carries, 37 yards, TD |
| UMass | Receiving | Tajae Sharpe | 13 receptions, 169 yards, 2 TDs |

=== vs Buffalo Bulls ===
Buffalo Bulls (3–2) vs Bowling Green Falcons (3–2) – Game summary

| Quarter | 1 | 2 | 3 | 4 | Total |
|---|---|---|---|---|---|
| Bulls | 7 | 21 | 0 | 7 | 35 |
| Falcons | 7 | 13 | 10 | 6 | 36 |

at Doyt Perry Stadium • Bowling Green, Ohio

- Date: October 4, 2014
- Game time: 12:30 p.m. EDT
- Game weather: 47 °F (8 °C)
- Game attendance: 17,185
- Referee: Jeff Maconaghy
- TV announcers (ESPN3): Greg Franke (play-by-play) and Tom Cole (analyst)

Game information

First quarter

- (05:36) UB – Joe Licata 1-yard run (Patrick Clarke kick) (Drive: 15 plays, 75 yards, 9:24; Buffalo 7-0)
- (02:43) BGSU – Travis Greene 4-yard run (Tyler Tate kick) (Drive: 11 plays, 75 yards, 2:52; Tied 7-7)

Second quarter

- (13:56) BGSU – Tyler Tate 32-yard field goal (Drive: 5 plays, 40 yards, 1:28; Bowling Green 10-7)
- (11:29) UB – Ron Willoughby 16-yard pass from Joe Licata (Patrick Clarke kick) (Drive: 5 plays, 70 yards, 2:24; Buffalo 14-10)
- (08:52) BGSU – James Knapke 1-yard run (Tyler Tate kick) (Drive: 10 plays, 65 yards, 2:37; Bowling Green 17-14)
- (06:50) UB – Anthone Taylor 8-yard run (Patrick Clarke kick) (Drive: 4 plays, 57 yards, 2:04; Buffalo 21-17)
- (02:02) UB – Anthone Taylor 1-yard run (Patrick Clarke kick) (Drive: 6 plays, 39 yards, 3:43; Buffalo 28-17)
- (00:19) BGSU – Tyler Tate 35-yard field goal (Drive: 7 plays, 47 yards, 1:35; Buffalo 28-20)

Third quarter

- (13:24) BGSU – Ronnie Moore 9-yard pass from James Knapke (Tyler Tate kick) (Drive: 4 plays, 57 yards, 1:29; Buffalo 28-27)
- (08:07) BGSU – Tyler Tate 31-yard field goal (Drive: 10 plays, 65 yards, 2:57; Bowling Green 30-28)

Fourth quarter

- (08:38) UB – Anthone Taylor 12-yard run (Patrick Clarke kick) (Drive: 9 plays, 69 yards, 3:58; Buffalo 35-30)
- (02:19) BGSU – Fred Coppet 4-yard run (James Knapke Two-Point Pass Failed) (Drive: 4 plays, 80 yards, :45; Bowling Green 36-35)

| Statistics | Buffalo | Bowling Green |
|---|---|---|
| First downs | 23 | 26 |
| Plays–yards | 71–368 | 76–321 |
| Rushes–yards | 47–234 | 37–187 |
| Passing yards | 134 | 321 |
| Passing: comp–att–int | 16–24–1 | 20–39–1 |
| Turnovers | 1 | 3 |
| Time of possession | 38:08 | 21:52 |

| Team | Category | Player | Statistics |
|---|---|---|---|
| Buffalo | Passing | Joe Licata | 16–24, 134 yards, TD, INT |
| Buffalo | Rushing | Anthone Taylor | 36 carries, 219 yards, 3 TDs |
| Buffalo | Receiving | Marcus McGill | 3 receptions, 41 yards |
| Bowling Green | Passing | James Knapke | 20–39, 321 yards, TD, INT |
| Bowling Green | Rushing | Travis Greene | 14 carries, 74 yards, TD |
| Bowling Green | Receiving | Ronnie Moore | 9 receptions, 178 yards, TD |

=== At Ohio Bobcats ===
Bowling Green Falcons (4–2) at Ohio Bobcats (3–3) – Game summary

| Quarter | 1 | 2 | 3 | 4 | Total |
|---|---|---|---|---|---|
| Falcons | 14 | 7 | 7 | 3 | 31 |
| Bobcats | 3 | 3 | 0 | 7 | 13 |

at Peden Stadium • Athens, Ohio

- Date: October 11, 2014
- Game time: 2:00 p.m. EDT
- Game weather: 61 °F (16 °C)
- Game attendance: 24,311
- Referee: A. Cannella
- TV announcers (CBSSN): Dave Weekly (play-by-play) and Rocky Boiman (analyst)

Game information

First quarter

- (13:37) BGSU – Travis Greene 27-yard pass from James Knapke (Tyler Tate kick) (Drive: 6 plays, 75 yards, 1:23; Bowling Green 7-0)
- (12:18) BGSU – Andre Givens 2-yard run (Tyler Tate kick) (Drive: 5 plays, 37 yards, 1:05; Bowling Green 14-0)
- (07:14) OHIO – Josiah Yazdani 25-yard field goal (Drive: 5 plays, 29 yards, 1:59; Bowling Green 14-3)

Second quarter

- (14:54) OHIO – Josiah Yazdani 37-yard field goal (Drive: 16 plays, 79 yards, 6:15; Bowling Green 14-6)
- (08:09) BGSU – Ryan Burbrink 8-yard pass from James Knapke (Tyler Tate kick) (Drive: 3 plays, 79 yards, :33; Bowling Green 21-6)

Third quarter

- (05:30) BGSU – Travis Greene 30-yard run (Tyler Tate kick) (Drive: 8 plays, 58 yards, 1:53; Bowling Green 28-6)

Fourth quarter

- (09:26) OHIO – Tim Edmond 2-yard run (Josiah Yazdani kick) (Drive: 15 plays, 77 yards, 5:00; Bowling Green 28-13)
- (03:40) BGSU – Tyler Tate 26-yard field goal (Drive: 11 plays, 66 yards, 5:46; Bowling Green 31-13)

| Statistics | Bowling Green | Ohio |
|---|---|---|
| First downs | 19 | 29 |
| Plays–yards | 66–355 | 110–513 |
| Rushes–yards | 27–95 | 46–127 |
| Passing yards | 260 | 386 |
| Passing: comp–att–int | 20–39–1 | 34–64–0 |
| Turnovers | 1 | 2 |
| Time of possession | 20:39 | 39:21 |

| Team | Category | Player | Statistics |
|---|---|---|---|
| Bowling Green | Passing | James Knapke | 20–39, 260 yards, 2 TD, INT |
| Bowling Green | Rushing | Travis Greene | 10 carries, 50 yards, TD |
| Bowling Green | Receiving | Roger Lewis | 6 receptions, 100 yards |
| Ohio | Passing | JD Sprague | 27–56, 325 yards |
| Ohio | Rushing | JD Sprague | 16 carries, 49 yards |
| Ohio | Receiving | Sebastian Smith | 9 receptions, 86 yards |

=== vs Western Michigan Broncos ===
Western Michigan Broncos (3–3) vs Bowling Green Falcons (5–2) – Game summary

| Quarter | 1 | 2 | 3 | 4 | Total |
|---|---|---|---|---|---|
| Broncos | 3 | 10 | 6 | 7 | 26 |
| Falcons | 7 | 7 | 0 | 0 | 14 |

at Doyt Perry Stadium • Bowling Green, Ohio

- Date: October 18, 2014
- Game time: 2:00 p.m. EDT
- Game weather: 50 °F (10 °C)
- Game attendance: 15,201
- Referee: Thomas McCabe
- TV announcers (BCSN): Greg Franke (play-by-play) and Tom Cole (analyst)

Game information

First quarter

- (11:11) BGSU – Andre Givens 2-yard run (Tyler Tate kick) (Drive: 13 plays, 75 yards, 3:49; Bowling Green 7-0)
- (03:36) WMU – Andrew Haldeman 25-yard field goal (Drive: 14 plays, 60 yards, 7:28; Bowling Green 7-3)

Second quarter

- (11:38) WMU – Corey Davis 4-yard pass from Zach Terrell (Andrew Haldeman kick) (Drive: 12 plays, 64 yards, 5:30; Western Michigan 10-7)
- (08:29) WMU – Andrew Haldeman 35-yard field goal (Drive: 7 plays, 16 yards, 2:31; Western Michigan 13-7)
- (00:31) BGSU – Andre Givens 1-yard run (Tyler Tate kick) (Drive: 17 plays, 83 yards, 4:58; Bowling Green 14-13)

Third quarter

- (12:17) WMU – Darius Phillips 63-yard pass from Zach Terrell (Andrew Haldeman kick failed) (Drive: 4 plays, 80 yards, 2:37; Western Michigan 19-14)

Fourth quarter

- (07:36) WMU – Jarvion Franklin 22-yard run (Andrew Haldeman kick) (Drive: 10 plays, 75 yards, 5:22; Western Michigan 26-14)

| Statistics | Western Michigan | Bowling Green |
|---|---|---|
| First downs | 20 | 14 |
| Plays–yards | 74–361 | 64–274 |
| Rushes–yards | 50–195 | 31–135 |
| Passing yards | 166 | 139 |
| Passing: comp–att–int | 15–24–0 | 20–33–1 |
| Turnovers | 0 | 2 |
| Time of possession | 39:26 | 20:34 |

| Team | Category | Player | Statistics |
|---|---|---|---|
| Western Michigan | Passing | Zach Terrell | 15–24, 166 yards, 2 TDs |
| Western Michigan | Rushing | Jarvion Franklin | 37 carries, 149 yards, TD |
| Western Michigan | Receiving | Darius Phillips | 3 receptions, 94 yards, TD |
| Bowling Green | Passing | James Knapke | 20–33, 139 yards, INT |
| Bowling Green | Rushing | Travis Greene | 14 carries, 46 yards |
| Bowling Green | Receiving | Ryan Burbrink | 5 receptions, 42 yards |

=== At Akron Zips ===
Bowling Green Falcons (5–3) at Akron Zips (4–4) – Game summary

| Quarter | 1 | 2 | 3 | 4 | Total |
|---|---|---|---|---|---|
| Falcons | 3 | 3 | 14 | 7 | 27 |
| Zips | 0 | 3 | 0 | 7 | 10 |

at InfoCision Stadium • Akron, Ohio

- Date: November 4, 2014
- Game time: 8:00 p.m. EDT
- Game weather: 58 °F (14 °C)
- Game attendance: 10,348
- Referee: Dan Willard
- TV announcers (ESPN2): Mark Neely (play-by-play), Ray Bentley (analyst) and Quint Kessenich (sidelines)

Game information

First quarter

- (03:58) BGSU – Tyler Tate 30-yard field goal (Drive: 9 plays, 54 yards, 3:37; Bowling Green 3-0)

Second quarter

- (14:54) AKRON – Robert Stein 40-yard field goal (Drive: 5 plays, 40 yards, 1:07; Tied 3-3)
- (08:21) BGSU – Tyler Tate 45-yard field goal (Drive: 8 plays, 45 yards, 2:18; Bowling Green 6-3)

Third quarter

- (09:29) BGSU – Taylor Royster 0-yard fumble recovery (Tyler Tate kick) (Bowling Green 13-3)
- (04:54) BGSU – Roger Lewis 10-yard pass from James Knapke (Tyler Tate kick) (Drive: 11 plays, 62 yards, 3:51; Bowling Green 20-3)

Fourth quarter

- (09:07) AKRON – Jawon Chisholm 15-yard run (Robert Stein kick) (Drive: 7 plays, 84 yards, 2:03; Bowling Green 20-10)
- (02:38) BGSU – Andre Givens 46-yard run (Tyler Tate kick) (Drive: 6 plays, 86 yards, 2:15; Bowling Green 27-10)

| Statistics | Bowling Green | Akron |
|---|---|---|
| First downs | 21 | 26 |
| Plays–yards | 85–389 | 90–398 |
| Rushes–yards | 51–219 | 27–94 |
| Passing yards | 170 | 304 |
| Passing: comp–att–int | 17–34–0 | 31–63–3 |
| Turnovers | 1 | 5 |
| Time of possession | 33:26 | 26:34 |

| Team | Category | Player | Statistics |
|---|---|---|---|
| Bowling Green | Passing | James Knapke | 17–34, 170 yards, TD |
| Bowling Green | Rushing | Fred Coppet | 18 carries, 113 yards |
| Bowling Green | Receiving | Gehrig Dieter | 3 receptions, 61 yards |
| Akron | Passing | Kyle Pohl | 31–62, 304 yards, 3 INTs |
| Akron | Rushing | Jawon Chisholm | 10 carries, 65 yards, TD |
| Akron | Receiving | Andrew Pratt | 6 receptions, 85 yards |

=== vs Kent State Golden Flashes ===
Kent State Golden Flashes (1–8) vs Bowling Green Falcons (6–3) – Game summary

| Quarter | 1 | 2 | 3 | 4 | Total |
|---|---|---|---|---|---|
| Golden Flashes | 0 | 7 | 7 | 6 | 20 |
| Falcons | 17 | 3 | 0 | 10 | 30 |

at Doyt Perry Stadium • Bowling Green, Ohio

- Date: November 12, 2014
- Game time: 8:00 p.m. EDT
- Game weather: 32 °F (0 °C)
- Game attendance: 8,417
- Referee: Mark Kluczynski
- TV: ESPN2

Game information

First quarter

- (08:17) BGSU – Andre Givens 6-yard run (Tyler Tate kick) (Drive: 7 plays, 58 yards, 2:00; Bowling Green 7-0)
- (05:47) BGSU – Roger Lewis 82-yard pass from James Knapke (Tyler Tate kick) (Drive: 3 plays, 82 yards, :53; Bowling Green 14-0)
- (00:30) BGSU – Tyler Tate 37-yard field goal (Drive: 7 plays, 16 yards, 2:26; Bowling Green 17-0)

Second quarter

- (11:15) BGSU – Tyler Tate 22-yard field goal (Drive: 9 plays, 75 yards, 3:24; Bowling Green 20-0)
- (00:38) KENT – Chris Humphrey 21-yard pass from Colin Reardon (Anthony Melchiori kick) (Drive: 11 plays, 92 yards, 5:51; 'Bowling Green 20-7)

Third quarter

- (06:09) KENT – Chris Humphrey 4-yard pass from Colin Reardon (Anthony Melchiori kick) (Drive: 3 plays, 6 yards, 1:02; 'Bowling Green 20-14)

Fourth quarter

- (11:59) BGSU – Tyler Tate 21-yard field goal (Drive: 15 plays, 65 yards, 5:04; Bowling Green 23-14)
- (09:40) KENT – Casey Pierce 14-yard pass from Colin Reardon (Anthony Melchiori kick failed) (Drive: 6 plays, 60 yards, 2:19; 'Bowling Green 23-20)
- (07:47) BGSU – Andre Givens 2-yard run (Tyler Tate kick) (Drive: 5 plays, 78 yards, 1:53; Bowling Green 30-20)

| Statistics | Kent State | Bowling Green |
|---|---|---|
| First downs | 21 | 27 |
| Plays–yards | 61–328 | 96–527 |
| Rushes–yards | 14–22 | 59–212 |
| Passing yards | 306 | 315 |
| Passing: comp–att–int | 27–47–4 | 22–37–1 |
| Turnovers | 5 | 2 |
| Time of possession | 25:46 | 34:14 |

| Team | Category | Player | Statistics |
|---|---|---|---|
| Kent State | Passing | Colin Reardon | 24–37, 284 yards, 3 TDs, 4 INTs |
| Kent State | Rushing | Nick Holley | 11 carries, 21 yards |
| Kent State | Receiving | Chris Humphrey | 8 receptions, 132 yards, 2 TDs |
| Bowling Green | Passing | James Knapke | 22–36, 315 yards, TD, INT |
| Bowling Green | Rushing | Andre Givens | 38 carries, 157 yards, 2 TDs |
| Bowling Green | Receiving | Roger Lewis | 3 receptions, 116 yards, TD |

The Falcons earned a berth to the 2014 MAC Championship Game by clinching the MAC Eastern Division regular season crown with a 30–20 victory over the Kent State Golden Flashes. Starting running back Travis Greene was held out of the contest due to an injury he sustained a week prior. Running back Andre Givens answered the call, rushing for a career-high 157 yards on 38 carries and two touchdowns. Wide receiver Ryan Burbrink caught eight passes for 111 yards. Bowling Green became the first team since the Miami RedHawks in 2003–2004 to win the East Division in back-to-back seasons.

=== At Toledo Rockets ===
Bowling Green Falcons (7–3) at Toledo Rockets (6–4) – Game summary

| Quarter | 1 | 2 | 3 | 4 | Total |
|---|---|---|---|---|---|
| Falcons | 3 | 7 | 3 | 7 | 20 |
| Rockets | 6 | 7 | 7 | 7 | 27 |

at Glass Bowl • Toledo, Ohio

- Date: November 19, 2014
- Game time: 8:00 p.m. EDT
- Game weather: 30 °F (−1 °C)
- Game attendance: 17,486
- Referee: Greg Blum
- TV announcers (ESPN2): Dave Lamont (play-by-play) and Ray Bentley (analyst)

Game information

First quarter

- (03:57) TOLEDO – Kareem Hunt 2-yard run (Jeremiah Detmer kick blocked) (Drive: 10 plays, 71 yards, 4:04; Toledo 6-0)
- (01:56) BGSU – Tyler Tate 23-yard field goal (Drive: 10 plays, 63 yards, 2:01; Toledo 6-3)

Second quarter

- (12:19) TOLEDO – Dwight Macon 2-yard run (Jeremiah Detmer kick) (Drive: 5 plays, 58 yards, 1:51; Toledo 13-3)
- (09:32) BGSU – Ronnie Moore 10-yard run (Tyler Tate kick) (Drive: 2 plays, 13 yards, :21; Toledo 13-10)

Third quarter

- (04:36) TOLEDO – Kareem Hunt 91-yard run (Jeremiah Detmer kick) (Drive: 1 play, 91 yards, :12; Toledo 20-10)
- (02:05) BGSU – Tyler Tate 31-yard field goal (Drive: 4 plays, 2 yards, :42; Toledo 13-20)

Fourth quarter

- (13:17) BGSU – Ronnie Moore 17-yard pass from Cody Callaway (Tyler Tate kick) (Drive: 6 plays, 86 yards, 1:36; Tied 20-20)
- (10:45) TOLEDO – Dwight Macon 7-yard run (Jeremiah Detmer kick) (Drive: 7 plays, 52 yards, 2:32; Toledo 27-20)

| Statistics | Bowling Green | Toledo |
|---|---|---|
| First downs | 17 | 19 |
| Plays–yards | 75–271 | 73–388 |
| Rushes–yards | 38–104 | 53–325 |
| Passing yards | 167 | 63 |
| Passing: comp–att–int | 12–37–0 | 9–20–2 |
| Turnovers | 0 | 3 |
| Time of possession | 25:39 | 34:21 |

| Team | Category | Player | Statistics |
|---|---|---|---|
| Bowling Green | Passing | Cody Callaway | 5–13, 96 yards, TD |
| Bowling Green | Rushing | Ronnie Moore | 12 carries, 64 yards, TD |
| Bowling Green | Receiving | Gehrig Dieter | 5 receptions, 68 yards |
| Toledo | Passing | Logan Woodside | 8–18, 53 yards, 2 INTs |
| Toledo | Rushing | Kareem Hunt | 30 carries, 265 yards, 2 TDs |
| Toledo | Receiving | Alonzo Russell | 2 receptions, 19 yards |

=== vs Ball State Cardinals ===
Ball State Cardinals (4–7) vs Bowling Green Falcons (7–4) – Game summary

| Quarter | 1 | 2 | 3 | 4 | Total |
|---|---|---|---|---|---|
| Cardinals | 7 | 17 | 10 | 7 | 41 |
| Falcons | 21 | 0 | 3 | 0 | 24 |

at Doyt Perry Stadium • Bowling Green, Ohio

- Date: November 28, 2014
- Game time: 1:00 p.m. EDT
- Game weather: 29 °F (−2 °C)
- Game attendance: 8,534
- Referee: Jeff Servinski
- TV: ESPN3

Game information

First quarter

- (14:49) BGSU – Travis Greene 75-yard run (Tyler Tate kick) (Drive: 1 play, 75 yards, :11; Bowling Green 7-0)
- (13:02) BALL – KeVonn Mabon 62-yard pass from Ozzie Mann (Scott Secor kick) (Drive: 3 plays, 66 yards, 1:41; Tied 7-7)
- (12:49) BGSU – Clint Stephens 96-yard kickoff return (Tyler Tate kick) (Bowling Green 14-7)
- (09:40) BGSU – Fred Coppet 2-yard run (Tyler Tate kick) (Drive: 5 plays, 82 yards, 1:35; Bowling Green 21-7)

Second quarter

- (11:29) BALL – Scott Secor 35-yard field goal (Drive: 15 plays, 53 yards, 8:24; Bowling Green 21-10)
- (04:31) BALL – Chris Schillings 25-yard pass from Ozzie Mann (Scott Secor kick) (Drive: 6 plays, 65 yards, 3:14; Bowling Green 21-17)
- (00:41) BALL – Jordan Williams 16-yard pass from Ozzie Mann (Scott Secor kick) (Drive: 9 plays, 80 yards, 2:53; Ball State 24-21)

Third quarter

- (10:42) BALL – Scott Secor 33-yard field goal (Drive: 9 plays, 39 yards, 4:11; Ball State 27-21)
- (06:33) BGSU – Tyler Tate 38-yard field goal (Drive: 9 plays, 55 yards, 4:03; Ball State 27-24)
- (00:58) BALL – Jahwan Edwards 1-yard run (Scott Secor kick) (Drive: 5 plays, 63 yards, 2:09; Ball State 34-24)

Fourth quarter

- (07:32) BALL – Jahwan Edwards 13-yard run (Scott Secor kick) (Drive: 10 plays, 75 yards, 5:55; Ball State 41-24)

| Statistics | Ball State | Bowling Green |
|---|---|---|
| First downs | 24 | 18 |
| Plays–yards | 68–485 | 66–454 |
| Rushes–yards | 39–199 | 39–314 |
| Passing yards | 286 | 140 |
| Passing: comp–att–int | 20–29–0 | 18–27–0 |
| Turnovers | 0 | 0 |
| Time of possession | 36:47 | 23:13 |

| Team | Category | Player | Statistics |
|---|---|---|---|
| Ball State | Passing | Ozzie Mann | 20–29, 286 yards, 3 TDs |
| Ball State | Rushing | Jahwan Edwards | 28 carries, 165 yards, 2 TDs |
| Ball State | Receiving | KeVonn Mabon | 6 receptions, 119 yards, TD |
| Bowling Green | Passing | James Knapke | 18–27, 140 yards |
| Bowling Green | Rushing | Travis Greene | 14 carries, 159 yards, TD |
| Bowling Green | Receiving | Roger Lewis | 4 receptions, 60 yards |

=== vs Northern Illinois Huskies ===
2014 MAC Championship Game
Northern Illinois Huskies (10–2, 7–1) vs. Bowling Green Falcons (7–5, 5–3)

| Quarter | 1 | 2 | 3 | 4 | Total |
|---|---|---|---|---|---|
| Huskies | 10 | 10 | 17 | 14 | 51 |
| Falcons | 0 | 10 | 0 | 7 | 17 |

at Ford Field • Detroit, MI

- Date: Friday, December 5, 2014
- Game time: 6:00 p.m. EST
- Game weather: N/A (game played indoors)
- Game attendance: 15,110
- Referee: Jeff Servinski
- TV announcers (ESPN2): Dave Flemming (play-by-play), Danny Kanell (analyst) and Allison Williams (sidelines)

Game information

First Quarter

- (05:57) NIU – Drew Hare 5-yard run (Christian Hagan kick) (Drive: 8 plays, 60 yards, 2:50; Northern Illinois 7-0)
- (01:58) NIU – Christian Hagan 35-yard field goal (Drive: 4 plays, 7 yards, 1:01; Northern Illinois 10-0)

Second Quarter

- (11:10) NIU – Christian Hagan 32-yard field goal (Drive: 13 plays, 31 yards, 3:55; Northern Illinois 13-0)
- (09:33) BGSU – Gehrig Dieter 42-yard pass from James Knapke (Tyler Tate kick) (Drive: 6 plays, 75 yards, 1:37; Northern Illinois 13-7)
- (00:25) NIU – Luke Eake 5-yard pass from Drew Hare (Christian Hagan kick) (Drive: 10 plays, 68 yards, 1:06; Northern Illinois 20-7)
- (00:00) NIU – Tyler Tate 46-yard field goal (Drive: 4 plays, 31 yards, :25; Northern Illinois 20-10)

Third Quarter

- (11:18) NIU – Juwan Brescacin 4-yard pass from Drew Hare (Christian Hagan kick) (Drive: 10 plays, 68 yards, 3:42; Northern Illinois 27-10)
- (08:18) NIU – Cameron Stingily 2-yard run (Christian Hagan kick) (Drive: 8 plays, 73 yards, 1:34; Northern Illinois 34-10)
- (04:15) NIU – Christian Hagan 23-yard field goal (Drive: 7 plays, 56 yards, 1:37; Northern Illinois 37-10)

Fourth Quarter

- (07:38) NIU – Cameron Stingily 2-yard run (Christian Hagan kick) (Drive: 8 plays, 30 yards, 4:39; Northern Illinois 44-10)
- (05:56) BGSU – Travis Greene 6-yard run (Tyler Tate kick) (Drive: 4 plays, 33 yards, 1:42; Northern Illinois 44-17)
- (00:48) NIU – Jordan Huff 2-yard run (Christian Hagan kick) (Drive: 8 plays, 79 yards, 5:08; Northern Illinois 51-17)

| Statistics | Northern Illinois | Bowling Green |
|---|---|---|
| First downs | 29 | 13 |
| Plays–yards | 100–552 | 60–287 |
| Rushes–yards | 51–334 | 35–124 |
| Passing yards | 218 | 163 |
| Passing: Comp–Att–Int | 29–49–1 | 13–25–3 |
| Turnovers | 2 | 4 |
| Time of possession | 37:59 | 22:01 |

| Team | Category | Player | Statistics |
|---|---|---|---|
| Northern Illinois | Passing | Drew Hare | 29–49, 218 yards, 2 TDs, INT |
| Northern Illinois | Rushing | Cameron Stingily | 15 carries, 116 yards, 2 TDs |
| Northern Illinois | Receiving | Juwan Brescacin | 7 receptions, 83 yards, TD |
| Bowling Green | Passing | James Knapke | 12–21, 151 yards, 1 TD, 2 INTs |
| Bowling Green | Rushing | Travis Greene | 18 carries, 105 yards, TD |
| Bowling Green | Receiving | Gehrig Dieter | 2 receptions, 56 yards, TD |

=== vs South Alabama Jaguars ===
2014 Camellia Bowl
South Alabama Jaguars (6–6, 5–3) vs. Bowling Green Falcons (7–6, 5–3)

| Quarter | 1 | 2 | 3 | 4 | Total |
|---|---|---|---|---|---|
| Jaguars | 7 | 0 | 7 | 14 | 28 |
| Falcons | 14 | 6 | 7 | 6 | 33 |

at Cramton Bowl • Montgomery, Alabama

- Date: December 20, 2014
- Game time: 9:15 p.m. CST
- Game weather: Sunny • Temperature: 54 °F (12 °C) • Wind: 5 mph (8.0 km/h) NE
- Game attendance: 20,256
- Referee: Brandon Cruse
- TV announcers (ESPN): Dave Lamont (play-by-play), Joey Galloway (analyst), and Paul Carcaterra (sideline)
- Box score

Game information

First quarter

- (11:59) BGSU – Roger Lewis 44-pass from James Knapke (Tyler Tate kick) (Drive: 7 plays, 65 yards, 2:21; Bowling Green 7-0)
- (07:17) BGSU – Travis Greene 1-yard run (Tyler Tate kick) (Drive: 9 plays, 93 yards, 2:57; Bowling Green 14-0)
- (05:42) USA – Kendall Houston 44-yard run (Aleem Sunanon kick) (Drive: 5 plays, 89 yards, 1:35; Bowling Green 14-7)

Second quarter

- (06:49) BGSU – Tyler Tate 39-yard field goal (Drive: 14 plays, 56 yards, 5:09; Bowling Green 17-7)
- (00:53) BGSU – Tyler Tate 22-yard field goal (Drive: 8 plays, 36 yards, 1:41; Bowling Green 20-7)

Third quarter

- (06:00) USA – Brandon Bridge 10-yard run (Aleem Sunanon kick) (Drive: 9 plays, 52 yards, 3:13; Bowling Green 20-14)
- (04:33) BGSU – Travis Greene 17-yard run (Tyler Tate kick) (Drive: 5 plays, 47 yards, 1:27; Bowling Green 27-14)

Fourth quarter

- (11:23) USA – DeMarrion Buford-Hughes 18-yard pass from Brandon Bridge (Aleem Sunanon kick) (Drive: 5 plays, 77 yards, 1:46; Bowling Green 27-21)
- (01:20) USA – Terrance Timmons 3-yard run (Aleem Sunanon kick) (Drive: 8 plays, 73 yards, 2:53; South Alabama 28-27)
- (01:04) BGSU – Roger Lewis 78-yard pass from James Knapke (James Knapke Two-Point Pass failed) (Drive: 1 play, 78 yards, :16; Bowling Green 33-28)

| Statistics | South Alabama | Bowling Green |
|---|---|---|
| First downs | 23 | 24 |
| Plays–yards | 75–415 | 90–500 |
| Rushes–yards | 38–136 | 49–131 |
| Passing yards | 279 | 369 |
| Passing: comp–att–int | 20–37–2 | 26–41–0 |
| Turnovers | 4 | 1 |
| Time of possession | 25:35 | 34:25 |

| Team | Category | Player | Statistics |
|---|---|---|---|
| South Alabama | Passing | Brandon Bridge | 20–37, 279 yards, 1 TD, 2 INTs |
| South Alabama | Rushing | Kendall Houston | 5 carries, 53 yards, TD |
| South Alabama | Receiving | Danny Woodson | 6 receptions, 122 yards |
| Bowling Green | Passing | James Knapke | 15–39, 368 yards, 2 TDs |
| Bowling Green | Rushing | Fred Coppet | 16 carries, 70 yards |
| Bowling Green | Receiving | Roger Lewis | 4 receptions, 137 yards, 2 TDs |

== Statistics ==
Final Statistics through December 20, 2014

=== Individual Leaders ===
==== Passing ====
Passing statistics (Note: Burbrink and Moore each threw one incompletion)
| NAME | GP | GS | Record | Cmp | Att | Pct | Yds | TD | Int | Rtg |
|---|---|---|---|---|---|---|---|---|---|---|
| James Knapke | 14 | 13 | 8–5 | 280 | 483 | 58.0 | 3,173 | 15 | 12 | 118.4 |
| Matt Johnson | 1 | 1 | 0–1 | 25 | 36 | 69.4 | 314 | 1 | 0 | 151.9 |
| Cody Callaway | 6 | 0 | 0–0 | 12 | 26 | 46.2 | 153 | 1 | 1 | 100.6 |
| Totals | 14 | 14 | 8–6 | 317 | 547 | 58.0 | 3,639 | 17 | 13 | 119.3 |

==== Rushing ====
Rushing statistics
| NAME | GP | Att | Yds | Avg | Lng | TD |
|---|---|---|---|---|---|---|
| Travis Greene | 12 | 180 | 949 | 5.3 | 75 | 12 |
| Fred Coppet | 13 | 141 | 764 | 3.4 | 69 | 6 |
| Andre Givens | 13 | 101 | 479 | 4.7 | 60 | 8 |
| James Knapke | 14 | 67 | 136 | 2.0 | 27 | 2 |
| Ronnie Moore | 14 | 21 | 129 | 6.1 | 31 | 2 |
| James Knapke | 14 | 67 | 136 | 2.0 | 27 | 2 |
| Cody Callaway | 6 | 12 | -26 | -2.2 | 4 | 0 |
| Chris Pohlman | 14 | 11 | 23 | 2.1 | 5 | 0 |
| Matt Johnson | 1 | 6 | -21 | -3.5 | 4 | 0 |
| Brandon English | 5 | 3 | 7 | 2.3 | 5 | 0 |
| Ryan Burbrink | 14 | 1 | 6 | 6.0 | 6 | 0 |
| Roger Lewis | 14 | 1 | -3 | -3.0 | -3 | 0 |
| Totals | 14 | 556 | 2,422 | 4.4 | 75 | 30 |

==== Receiving ====
Receiving statistics
| NAME | GP | Rec | Yds | Avg | Lng | TD |
|---|---|---|---|---|---|---|
| Roger Lewis | 14 | 73 | 1,093 | 15.0 | 82 | 7 |
| Ryan Burbrink | 14 | 64 | 758 | 11.8 | 45 | 3 |
| Ronnie Moore | 14 | 56 | 690 | 12.3 | 42 | 5 |
| Gehrig Dieter | 9 | 35 | 460 | 13.1 | 53 | 1 |
| Heath Jackson | 14 | 34 | 270 | 7.9 | 30 | 0 |
| Travis Greene | 12 | 27 | 175 | 6.5 | 27 | 1 |
| Fred Coppet | 13 | 8 | 27 | 3.4 | 18 | 0 |
| Herve Coby | 14 | 7 | 56 | 8.0 | 22 | 0 |
| Teo Redding | 7 | 5 | 59 | 11.8 | 43 | 0 |
| Andre Givens | 13 | 3 | 9 | 3.0 | 7 | 0 |
| John Klingerman | 3 | 2 | 21 | 10.5 | 11 | 0 |
| Chris Pohlman | 14 | 2 | 11 | 5.5 | 9 | 0 |
| Trevor Roop | 2 | 1 | 10 | 10.0 | 10 | 0 |
| Totals | 14 | 317 | 3,639 | 11.5 | 82 | 17 |

==== Defense ====
Defense statistics
| Name | GP | SOLO | AST | TOT | TFL-Yds | SACK-Yds | INT-Yds | Lng | PBU | QBH | FR-Yds | FF | BLK | SAF | TD |
|---|---|---|---|---|---|---|---|---|---|---|---|---|---|---|---|
| Gabe Martin | 14 | 54 | 61 | 115 | 18-58 | 2.5-19 | 2-37 | 37 | 4 | 3 | 1-0 | 1 | 1 | 0 | 0 |
| Brian Sutton | 14 | 59 | 45 | 104 | 7.5-25 | 1-10 | 0 | 0 | 1 | 0 | 2-2 | 3 | 0 | 0 | 0 |
| Jude Adjei-Barimah | 14 | 56 | 26 | 82 | 4-20 | 1.5-15 | 1-0 | 0 | 11 | 1 | 0 | 2 | 0 | 0 | 0 |
| Ryland Ward | 11 | 47 | 32 | 79 | 1.5-2 | 0 | 3-32 | 19 | 2 | 0 | 1-2 | 0 | 0 | 0 | 0 |
| Nick Johnson | 14 | 53 | 19 | 72 | 0 | 0 | 5-63 | 41 | 8 | 0 | 0 | 0 | 0 | 0 | 0 |
| James Sanford | 14 | 38 | 33 | 71 | 4-29 | 2.5-21 | 0 | 0 | 4 | 1 | 1-0 | 2 | 0 | 0 | 0 |
| Gus Schwieterman | 14 | 19 | 36 | 55 | 7.5-27 | 2.5-8 | 0 | 0 | 1 | 1 | 2-0 | 1 | 0 | 0 | 0 |
| Charlie Walker | 14 | 31 | 21 | 52 | 5-20 | 1-11 | 0 | 0 | 1 | 4 | 1-0 | 1 | 0 | 0 | 0 |
| Dernard Turner | 14 | 24 | 24 | 48 | 2.5-3 | 0 | 0 | 0 | 0 | 1 | 0 | 1 | 0 | 0 | 0 |
| Bryan Thomas | 14 | 23 | 25 | 48 | 15-56 | 8-35 | 0 | 0 | 3 | 5 | 0 | 5 | 0 | 0 | 0 |
| Paul Senn | 10 | 23 | 22 | 45 | 4.5-13 | 1-7 | 0 | 0 | 3 | 1 | 1-0 | 1 | 0 | 0 | 0 |
| Taylor Royster | 14 | 15 | 26 | 41 | 5.5-13 | 1-5 | 1-0 | 0 | 2 | 1 | 4-0 | 0 | 1 | 0 | 0 |
| D. J. Lynch | 9 | 15 | 24 | 39 | 4.5-15 | 1-9 | 0 | 0 | 2 | 1 | 0 | 0 | 0 | 0 | 0 |
| Darrell Hunter | 11 | 22 | 10 | 32 | 0 | 0 | 0 | 0 | 7 | 0 | 0 | 0 | 0 | 0 | 0 |
| Nate Locke | 14 | 12 | 18 | 30 | 1.5-2 | 0 | 0 | 0 | 7 | 0 | 1-0 | 0 | 0 | 0 | 0 |
| Isaiah Gourdine | 13 | 9 | 12 | 21 | 0 | 0 | 0 | 0 | 0 | 0 | 0 | 0 | 0 | 0 | 0 |
| Kendall Montgomery | 14 | 9 | 11 | 20 | 3.5-11 | 2-7 | 0 | 0 | 3 | 6 | 1-0 | 1 | 0 | 0 | 0 |
| Austin Valdez | 13 | 9 | 11 | 20 | 1-1 | 0 | 0 | 0 | 0 | 0 | 0 | 0 | 0 | 0 | 0 |
| Will Watson | 12 | 14 | 5 | 19 | 1-3 | 0 | 0 | 0 | 1 | 0 | 0 | 0 | 0 | 0 | 0 |
| Brian Baird | 13 | 7 | 12 | 19 | 4-18 | 1-7 | 0 | 0 | 0 | 1 | 0 | 0 | 0 | 0 | 0 |
| Clint Stephens | 11 | 12 | 6 | 18 | 0 | 0 | 4-40 | 40 | 9 | 0 | 0 | 0 | 0 | 0 | 0 |
| Jhalil-Nashid Croley | 12 | 3 | 13 | 16 | 1.5-4 | 1-3 | 0 | 0 | 0 | 2 | 0 | 0 | 0 | 0 | 0 |
| Shannon Smith | 12 | 3 | 9 | 12 | 3-6 | 1-4 | 0 | 0 | 0 | 0 | 1-0 | 0 | 0 | 0 | 0 |
| Izaah Lunsford | 13 | 6 | 6 | 12 | 2-4 | 0 | 0 | 0 | 1 | 1 | 0 | 0 | 0 | 0 | 0 |
| Terranace Bush | 6 | 3 | 8 | 11 | 1-7 | 1-7 | 0 | 0 | 0 | 0 | 0 | 0 | 0 | 0 | 0 |
| Ronnie Moore | 14 | 4 | 5 | 9 | 0 | 0 | 0 | 0 | 0 | 0 | 0 | 0 | 0 | 0 | 0 |
| Matt Robinson | 11 | 5 | 3 | 8 | 0 | 0 | 0 | 0 | 1 | 0 | 0 | 0 | 0 | 0 | 0 |
| Victor Osborne | 4 | 5 | 3 | 8 | 0 | 0 | 0 | 0 | 0 | 0 | 0 | 0 | 0 | 0 | 0 |
| Herve Coby | 14 | 7 | 1 | 8 | 0 | 0 | 0 | 0 | 0 | 0 | 0 | 0 | 1 | 0 | 0 |
| Nilijah Ballew | 10 | 6 | 2 | 8 | 0 | 0 | 0 | 0 | 2 | 0 | 0 | 0 | 0 | 0 | 0 |
| Monti Phillips | 9 | 3 | 4 | 7 | 0 | 0 | 0 | 0 | 0 | 0 | 0 | 0 | 0 | 0 | 0 |
| Aaron Banks | 4 | 3 | 3 | 6 | 0 | 0 | 0 | 0 | 0 | 0 | 0 | 0 | 0 | 0 | 0 |
| Zac Bartman | 11 | 2 | 4 | 6 | 0 | 0 | 0 | 0 | 0 | 0 | 0 | 0 | 0 | 0 | 0 |
| Roger Lewis | 14 | 3 | 1 | 4 | 0 | 0 | 0 | 0 | 0 | 0 | 0 | 0 | 0 | 0 | 0 |
| Malik Brown | 6 | 3 | 1 | 4 | 0 | 0 | 0 | 0 | 1 | 0 | 0 | 0 | 0 | 0 | 0 |
| Greg Hohenstein | 12 | 2 | 1 | 3 | 0 | 0 | 0 | 0 | 0 | 0 | 0 | 0 | 0 | 0 | 0 |
| Fred Coppet | 13 | 3 | 0 | 3 | 0 | 0 | 0 | 0 | 0 | 0 | 0 | 0 | 0 | 0 | 0 |
| Alfonso Mack | 5 | 2 | 0 | 2 | 0 | 0 | 0 | 0 | 0 | 0 | 0 | 0 | 0 | 0 | 0 |
| Joseph Davidson | 14 | 2 | 0 | 2 | 0 | 0 | 0 | 0 | 0 | 0 | 0 | 0 | 0 | 0 | 0 |
| Chris Pohlman | 14 | 2 | 0 | 2 | 0 | 0 | 0 | 0 | 0 | 0 | 0 | 0 | 0 | 0 | 0 |
| Ben Hale | 10 | 1 | 1 | 2 | 0 | 0 | 0 | 0 | 0 | 0 | 0 | 0 | 0 | 0 | 0 |
| Dominique Carter | 5 | 1 | 0 | 1 | 0 | 0 | 0 | 0 | 0 | 0 | 0 | 0 | 0 | 0 | 0 |
| John Klingerman | 3 | 1 | 0 | 1 | 0 | 0 | 0 | 0 | 0 | 0 | 0 | 0 | 0 | 0 | 0 |
| Ben Steward | 14 | 1 | 0 | 1 | 0 | 0 | 0 | 0 | 0 | 0 | 0 | 0 | 0 | 0 | 0 |
| Tim Mcauliffe | 14 | 1 | 0 | 1 | 0 | 0 | 0 | 0 | 0 | 0 | 0 | 0 | 0 | 0 | 0 |
| Teo Redding | 7 | 0 | 1 | 1 | 0 | 0 | 0 | 0 | 0 | 0 | 0 | 0 | 0 | 0 | 0 |
| Zach Colvin | 1 | 0 | 0 | 0 | 0 | 0 | 0 | 0 | 0 | 1 | 0 | 0 | 0 | 0 | 0 |
| Totals | 14 | 623 | 546 | 1,169 | 98-337 | 28-168 | 16-172 | 41 | 67 | 30 | 17-20 | 18 | 3 | 0 | 0 |

==== Special teams ====
Kicking statistics
| NAME | GP | FGM | FGA | Pct | 0–19 | 20–29 | 30–39 | 40–49 | 50+ | Lng | XPM | XPA | Pct | Pts |
|---|---|---|---|---|---|---|---|---|---|---|---|---|---|---|
| Tyler Tate | 14 | 23 | 29 | 79.3 | 0–1 | 8–9 | 10–12 | 4–5 | 1–2 | 52 | 45 | 48 | 93.8 | 113 |
| Totals | 14 | 23 | 29 | 79.3 | 0–1 | 8–9 | 10–12 | 4–5 | 1–2 | 52 | 45 | 48 | 93.8 | 113 |

Kickoff statistics
| NAME | GP | Num | Yds | Avg | Lng | TB | OB |
|---|---|---|---|---|---|---|---|
| Anthony Farinella | 14 | 87 | 5,046 | 58.0 | 95 | 15 | 3 |
| Totals | 14 | 87 | 5,046 | 58.0 | 95 | 15 | 3 |

Punting statistics
| NAME | GP | Punts | Yds | Avg | Lng | TB | I–20 | 50+ | Dwn | FC | Blk |
|---|---|---|---|---|---|---|---|---|---|---|---|
| Joseph Davidson | 14 | 82 | 3,482 | 42.5 | 78 | 3 | 24 | 14 | 24 | 23 | 0 |
| Totals | 14 | 82 | 3,482 | 42.5 | 78 | 3 | 24 | 14 | 24 | 23 | 0 |

==== Returns ====
Punt return statistics
| NAME | Ret | Yds | Avg | Lng | TD |
|---|---|---|---|---|---|
| Ryan Burbrink | 13 | 127 | 9.8 | 75 | 1 |
| Teo Redding | 2 | 7 | 3.5 | 5 | 0 |
| Herve Coby | 1 | 29 | 29.0 | 29 | 1 |
| Totals | 16 | 163 | 10.2 | 75 | 2 |

Kick return statistics
| NAME | Ret | Yds | Avg | Lng | TD |
|---|---|---|---|---|---|
| Clint Stephens | 21 | 505 | 24.0 | 96 | 1 |
| Ronnie Moore | 20 | 424 | 21.2 | 41 | 0 |
| Andre Givens | 6 | 120 | 20.0 | 40 | 0 |
| Herve Coby | 3 | 59 | 19.7 | 23 | 0 |
| Shannon Smith | 3 | 29 | 9.7 | 13 | 0 |
| Clay Rolf | 2 | 38 | 19.0 | 26 | 0 |
| Austin Valdez | 2 | 36 | 18.0 | 30 | 0 |
| Brian Sutton | 2 | 9 | 9.0 | 9 | 0 |
| Brandon English | 1 | 27 | 27.0 | 27 | 0 |
| Ryan Burbrink | 1 | 21 | 21.0 | 21 | 0 |
| Fred Coppet | 1 | 20 | 20.0 | 20 | 0 |
| Totals | 62 | 1,288 | 20.8 | 96 | 1 |
