= 2014 Ohio Bobcats football team =

American college football season

2014 Ohio Bobcats football
- Conference: Mid-American Conference
- East Division
- Record: 6–6 (4–4 MAC)
- Head coach: Frank Solich (10th season)
- Offensive coordinator: Tim Albin (10th season)
- Offensive scheme: Spread option
- Defensive coordinator: Jim Burrow (10th season)
- Base defense: 4-3
- Home stadium: Peden Stadium

2014 Mid-American Conference football standings
	Conf.			Overall
Team	W		L	W		L
East Division
Bowling Green x	5	–	3	8	–	6
Ohio	4	–	4	6	–	6
Buffalo	3	–	4	5	–	6
Akron	3	–	5	5	–	7
UMass	3	–	5	3	–	9
Miami (OH)	2	–	6	2	–	10
Kent State	1	–	6	2	–	9
West Division
Northern Illinois xy$	7	–	1	11	–	3
Toledo x	7	–	1	9	–	4
Western Michigan	6	–	2	8	–	5
Central Michigan	5	–	3	7	–	6
Ball State	4	–	4	5	–	7
Eastern Michigan	1	–	7	2	–	10
Championship: Northern Illinois 51, Bowling Green 17
$ – Conference champion; x – Division champion/co-champions; y – Championship game participant

The 2014 Ohio Bobcats football team represented Ohio University in the 2014 NCAA Division I FBS football season. They were led by tenth year head coach Frank Solich and played their home games at Peden Stadium. They were members of the East Division of the Mid-American Conference. They finished the season 6–6, 4–4 in MAC play to finish in second place in the East Division. Despite being bowl eligible, they were not invited to a bowl game.

== Schedule ==
Date	Time	Opponent	Site	TV	Result	Attendance
August 30	6:00 p.m.	at Kent State	Dix Stadium; Kent, OH	ESPN3	W 17–14	22,754
September 6	3:30 p.m.	at Kentucky*	Commonwealth Stadium; Lexington, KY	ESPNU	L 3–20	51,910
September 13	12:00 p.m.	at Marshall*	Joan C. Edwards Stadium; Huntington, WV (Battle for the Bell)	CBSSN	L 14–44	31,710
September 20	7:00 p.m.	Idaho*	Peden Stadium; Athens, OH	ESPN3	W 36–24	25,211
September 27	2:00 p.m.	Eastern Illinois*	Peden Stadium; Athens, OH	ESPN3	W 34–19	23,027
October 4	3:30 p.m.	at Central Michigan	Kelly/Shorts Stadium; Mount Pleasant, MI	ESPN3	L 10–28	18,223
October 11	2:00 p.m.	Bowling Green^{†}	Peden Stadium; Athens, OH	ESPN3	L 13–31	24,311
October 18	2:00 p.m.	Akron	Peden Stadium; Athens, OH	ESPN3	W 23–20	20,018
October 25	2:00 p.m.	at Western Michigan	Waldo Stadium; Kalamazoo, MI	ESPN3	L 21–42	20,225
November 5	8:00 p.m.	Buffalo	Peden Stadium; Athens, OH	ESPNU	W 37–14	15,405
November 18	8:00 p.m.	Northern Illinois	Peden Stadium; Athens, OH	ESPNU	L 14–21	15,118
November 25	7:00 p.m.	at Miami (OH)	Yager Stadium; Oxford, OH (Battle of the Bricks)	ESPN2	W 24–21	11,956
*Non-conference game; ^{†}Homecoming; All times are in Eastern time
