= 2014 Eastern Michigan Eagles football team =

American college football season

2014 Eastern Michigan Eagles football
- Conference: Mid-American Conference
- West Division
- Record: 2–10 (1–7 MAC)
- Head coach: Chris Creighton (1st season)
- Offensive coordinator: Kalen DeBoer (1st season)
- Offensive scheme: Spread
- Defensive coordinator: Brad McCaslin (1st season)
- Base defense: 4–3
- Home stadium: Rynearson Stadium

2014 Mid-American Conference football standings
	Conf.			Overall
Team	W		L	W		L
East Division
Bowling Green x	5	–	3	8	–	6
Ohio	4	–	4	6	–	6
Buffalo	3	–	4	5	–	6
Akron	3	–	5	5	–	7
UMass	3	–	5	3	–	9
Miami (OH)	2	–	6	2	–	10
Kent State	1	–	6	2	–	9
West Division
Northern Illinois xy$	7	–	1	11	–	3
Toledo x	7	–	1	9	–	4
Western Michigan	6	–	2	8	–	5
Central Michigan	5	–	3	7	–	6
Ball State	4	–	4	5	–	7
Eastern Michigan	1	–	7	2	–	10
Championship: Northern Illinois 51, Bowling Green 17
$ – Conference champion; x – Division champion/co-champions; y – Championship game participant

The 2014 Eastern Michigan Eagles football team represented Eastern Michigan University in the 2014 NCAA Division I FBS football season. The Eagles, led by first year head coach Chris Creighton, played their home games at Rynearson Stadium and were members of the West Division of the Mid-American Conference. They finished the season 2–10, 1–7 in MAC play to finish in last place in the West Division.

This season saw Eastern Michigan play on a new gray FieldTurf surface at Rynearson Stadium. The facility was only the second in FBS with a non-traditional field color, after Albertsons Stadium at Boise State, and only the sixth such facility in all of college football. EMU Football has nicknamed the field at Rynearson Stadium "The Factory" and installed a new tradition of knocking down a cinder block wall before homes games. The new coach has also had the ROTC cannon removed, which traditionally fires off after an EMU score.

== Awards ==
Preseason

Hustlebelt.com Preseason Top 50

- Bronson Hill 18th
- Tyreese Russell 28th
- Lincoln Hansen 41st

Doak Walker Award Candidate

- Bronson Hill

College Football Performance Awards Watch List

- Bronson Hill
- Tyreese Russell

Athlon Sports Preseason All-MAC 1st Team

- Lincoln Hansen
- Tyreese Russell

Athlon Sports Preseason All-MAC 3rd Team

- Bronson Hill
- Jake Hurcombe
- Pat O'Connor

Phil Steele Preseason All-MAC 1st Team

- Lincoln Hansen
- Tyreese Russell

Phil Steele Preseason All-MAC 3rd Team

- Bronson Hill

Lombardi Award Watch List

- Lincoln Hansen

John Mackey Award Watch List

- Tyreese Russell

Regular Season

MAC West Division Special Teams Player of the Week

- Nathan Adams (August 30)

== Schedule ==
Date	Time	Opponent	Site	TV	Result	Attendance
August 30	6:00 p.m.	Morgan State*	Rynearson Stadium; Ypsilanti, MI	ESPN3	W 31–28	8,748
September 6	4:00 p.m.	at Florida*	Ben Hill Griffin Stadium; Gainesville, FL	SECN	L 0–65	81,049
September 13	6:00 p.m.	at Old Dominion*	Foreman Field; Norfolk, VA	Cox 110	L 3–17	20,118
September 20	Noon	at No. 11 Michigan State*	Spartan Stadium; East Lansing, MI	BTN	L 14–73	73,846
October 4	2:00 p.m.	at Akron	InfoCision Stadium; Akron, OH	ESPN3	L 6–31	8,416
October 11	1:00 p.m.	Buffalo^{†}	Rynearson Stadium; Ypsilanti, MI	ESPN3	W 37–27	11,886
October 18	3:00 p.m.	at Massachusetts	Gillette Stadium; Foxborough, MA	ESPN3	L 14–36	12,030
October 25	1:00 p.m.	Northern Illinois	Rynearson Stadium; Ypsilanti, MI	ESPN3	L 17–28	19,654
November 1	1:00 p.m.	Central Michigan	Rynearson Stadium; Ypsilanti, MI (rivalry)	ESPN3	L 7–38	19,613
November 15	1:00 p.m.	at Western Michigan	Waldo Stadium; Kalamazoo, MI (Michigan MAC Trophy)	ESPN3	L 7–51	12,985
November 22	2:00 p.m.	at Ball State	Scheumann Stadium; Muncie, IN	ESPN3	L 30–45	5,317
November 28	1:00 p.m.	Toledo	Rynearson Stadium; Ypsilanti, MI	ESPN3	L 16–52	15,226
*Non-conference game; ^{†}Homecoming; Rankings from AP Poll released prior to game; All times are in Eastern time

Schedule source:

== Week 1 ==
Eastern Michigan vs Morgan State

- EMU opened the season at home vs the Morgan State Bears. This was the first game for EMU's head coach Chris Creighton and for Morgan State's head coach Lee Hull at the FBS & FCS levels respectively. Also this was the first ever game between the two teams. Eastern Michigan defeated the Morgan State Bears by a score of 31–28 in an exciting game. Morgan State received the ball on the opening kickoff and the Bears marched right down the field on its opening possession. Bears QB Robert Council engineered a 13-play, 75-yard drive and Lamont Brown III capped off the drive with a 3-yard touchdown run at the 8:08 mark in the first quarter. Eastern Michigan countered with a 75-yard drive of its own. Eagles QB Reginald Bell ran the ball 12 times on the drive, culminating in a 1-yard touchdown run by Darius Jackson with 3:06 left in the first quarter. 7–7. EMU's special teams came up big for the Eagles. Nathan Adams blocked a punt by Lawrence Forbes, and scooped it up in the endzone to give EMU a 14–7 lead with 54 seconds left in the first quarter. The Eagles also blocked a 41-yd field goal attempt by Chris Moller at the 9:58 mark of the second quarter. Bell found an open Ryan Brumfield for the rush into the end zone, this time making a 16-yard jaunt to elevate EMU's lead to 21–7 with 6:49 to play. Lamont Brown III turned a screen pass from Council into a 46-yard touchdown down the middle of the field. The score trimmed the EMU's lead to 21–14 with 4:57 left in the half. Council led his team to another score just before halftime. He completed an 18-yard pass to Ladarious Spearman, followed by a 15-yard scramble, before tossing a 34-yard TD strike to Landen Malbrough. In the third quarter, Morgan State took the lead when Council rolled out and connected with Thomas Martin who was wide open in the middle of the field for a 75-yard touchdown. After a stalled opening 2nd half drive Brogan Roback entered the game for EMU. Roback led the Eagles on a 10-play, 76-yard drive and capped it with a 7-yard TD pass to Dustin Creel with 2:04 in 3rd quarter. The winning field goal was a 42-yd field goal by Dylan Mulder with 13:41 left to play. As a result of the blocked punt and touchdown Eastern Michigan University sophomore Nathan Adams was named the Mid-American Conference West Division Special Teams Player of the Week for the period ending August 30. Morgan State linebacker Cody Acker was named the Mid-Eastern Athletic Conference's defensive player of the week, after a 19 tackle game.

== Week 2 ==
EMU (1–0) at Florida (0–0)

The contest marked the first loss of the season for the Green and White as well as the first with Head Coach Chris Creighton. Meanwhile, UF snapped a seven-game losing skid to improve to 1–0 after having its game a week earlier canceled due to weather. Five turnovers hurt the Eagles as the offense picked up 125 yards. Brogan Roback went 5-for-10 as Eastern used three different quarterbacks throughout the day. EMU starting quarterback Reginald Bell was the team's leading rusher alongside Tyler Allen (Lansing, Mich.-Eastern) as both Eagles ran for 20 yards on the ground, with all of Bell's coming in the opening half. Tyreese Russell caught two passes for 20 yards, while Dustin Creel added 16 yards receiving on two catches.

On the defensive side of the ball, Great Ibe and Ray Tillman tallied a team-high 11 tackles. Tillman's double-digit day set a career best, tying the amount of tackles he recorded throughout the entire 2013 season. Reigning Mid-American Conference West Special Teams Player of the Week Nathan Adams also chipped in on defense, making a tackle behind the line of scrimmage on a Florida fourth down play in the red zone.

Florida's Jeff Driskel went 31-for-45 for 248 yards, while backup quarterback Treon Harris completed a pair of passes for 148 yards. Demarcus Robinson led the receiving corps with six catches for 123 yards, including a 70-yards touchdown reception. The Gators chalked up 259 yards rushing as well for a total of 655 yards from scrimmage on the day. The final score was 0–65. Eagles were kept off the scoreboard for the first time in 69 games, dating back to September 27, 2008, against Northern Illinois University.

== Week 3 ==
EMU (1–1) at Old Dominion (1–1)

== Off-field issues ==
The Friday before the Morgan State game, three EMU football players were charged with assault. The players were Darius Scott, Quincy Jones and Jay Jones. Scott, 22, of Chicago, is a senior defensive back from Simeon Academy. Quincy Jones, 20, is a junior wide receiver from Cleveland. and Jay Jones is a redshirt junior wide receiver from Palm Coast, Florida. The charges stem from an assault that took place at 12:49 p.m. Friday at Huron River Drive and LeForge Road, EMU Police records show. The players didn't play and weren't listed on the team's official depth chart for Saturday's game against Morgan State. According to records the three players were beating the cousin of the man who shot and killed Demarius Reed last year. Demarius Reed was a WR for Eastern Michigan, who was shot and killed during the 2013 football season.
