= 2014 Akron Zips football team =

American college football season

2014 Akron Zips football
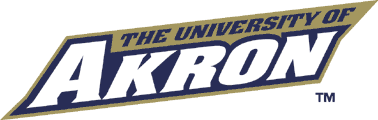
- Conference: Mid-American Conference
- East Division
- Record: 5–7 (3–5 MAC)
- Head coach: Terry Bowden (3rd season)
- Offensive coordinator: A. J. Milwee (2nd season)
- Offensive scheme: Spread
- Defensive coordinator: Chuck Amato (3rd season)
- Base defense: 4–3
- Home stadium: InfoCision Stadium–Summa Field

2014 Mid-American Conference football standings
	Conf.			Overall
Team	W		L	W		L
East Division
Bowling Green x	5	–	3	8	–	6
Ohio	4	–	4	6	–	6
Buffalo	3	–	4	5	–	6
Akron	3	–	5	5	–	7
UMass	3	–	5	3	–	9
Miami (OH)	2	–	6	2	–	10
Kent State	1	–	6	2	–	9
West Division
Northern Illinois xy$	7	–	1	11	–	3
Toledo x	7	–	1	9	–	4
Western Michigan	6	–	2	8	–	5
Central Michigan	5	–	3	7	–	6
Ball State	4	–	4	5	–	7
Eastern Michigan	1	–	7	2	–	10
Championship: Northern Illinois 51, Bowling Green 17
$ – Conference champion; x – Division champion/co-champions; y – Championship game participant

The 2014 Akron Zips football team represented the University of Akron in the 2014 NCAA Division I FBS football season. They were led by third-year head coach Terry Bowden and played their home games at InfoCision Stadium–Summa Field. They were members of the East Division of the Mid-American Conference. They finished the season 5–7, 3–5 in MAC play to finish in a tie for fourth place in the East Division.

== Schedule ==
Date	Time	Opponent	Site	TV	Result	Attendance
August 28	7:00 p.m.	Howard*	InfoCision Stadium; Akron, OH	ESPN3	W 41–0	9,104
September 6	Noon	at Penn State*	Beaver Stadium; University Park, PA	ABC/ESPN2	L 3–21	97,354
September 20	2:00 p.m.	Marshall*	InfoCision Stadium; Akron, OH	ESPN3	L 17–48	13,357
September 27	1:30 p.m.	at Pittsburgh*	Heinz Field; Pittsburgh, PA	ESPN3	W 21–10	40,059
October 4	2:00 p.m.	Eastern Michigan^{†}	InfoCision Stadium; Akron, OH	ESPN3	W 31–6	8,416
October 11	2:00 p.m.	Miami (OH)	InfoCision Stadium; Akron, OH	ESPN3	W 29–19	8,223
October 18	2:00 p.m.	at Ohio	Peden Stadium; Athens, OH	ESPN3	L 20–23	20,018
October 25	2:00 p.m.	at Ball State	Scheumann Stadium; Muncie, IN	ESPN3	L 21–35	7,617
November 4	8:00 p.m.	Bowling Green	InfoCision Stadium; Akron, OH	ESPN2	L 10–27	10,348
November 11	8:00 p.m.	at Buffalo	UB Stadium; Amherst, NY	ESPNU	L 24–55	17,343
November 18	7:00 p.m.	Massachusetts	InfoCision Stadium; Akron, OH	ESPN3	W 30–6	5,571
November 28	Noon	at Kent State	Dix Stadium; Kent, OH (Battle for the Wagon Wheel)	ESPN3	L 24–27	5,118
*Non-conference game; ^{†}Homecoming; All times are in Eastern time

== Roster ==
2014 Akron Zips football team roster
Players
Coaches
Offense

Pos.	#	Name	Class
WR	1	Mykel Traylor-Bennett	So
WR	2	Tyler Williams	Sr
WR	3	L. T. Smith	Sr
WR	4	Fransohn Bickley	So
WR	5	Tyrell Goodman	Jr
QB	6	Matthew Hoyer	So
RB	7	Jawon Chisholm	Sr
WR	8	Keith Sconiers	Sr
QB	9	Tra'Von Chapman (I)	So
RB	10	Hakeem Lawrence	So
WR	11	Zach D'Orazio	Jr
WR	12	Imani Davis	Jr
QB	13	Tommy Woodson	Fr
QB	15	Nick Hirschman	Sr
QB	16	Kyle Pohl	Jr
WR	17	Wade Edwards	So
QB	18	Chandler Kincade	Fr
QB	23	Devyn Wood	Fr
RB	25	D. J. Jones	So
RB	27	Donnell Alexander (I)	Jr
RB	28	Manny Morgan	Fr
WR	33	Nice Bice	Jr
RB	34	Conor Hundley	Jr
WR	37	Danny Seafler	Jr
WR	38	Julian Lowe	So
WR	40	Rufus Walls	Fr
TE	45	Jeff Allen	Sr
WR	47	Josh Smith	Fr
FB	49	Christian Allen	Jr
OL	50	Joe McNamara	Sr
OL	55	Tommy Brown	Jr
OL	56	Isaiah Williams	Jr
OL	57	Stephen Ericksen	Fr
OL	62	Rodney Carroll	So
OL	66	Kyle Ritz	Fr
OL	67	Travis Switzer	Sr
OL	70	Michael Casimos	So
OL	71	Quaison Osborne	Jr
OL	72	Scott Boyett	Jr
OL	73	Brett Lee	Jr
OL	74	Cedric Brittnum	Sr
OL	75	Dylan Brumbaugh	Jr
OL	77	Andrew Bohan	Jr
WR	80	Andrew Pratt	Jr
WR	82	Austin Wolf	Fr
TE	83	Michael Kish	Fr
TE	84	Jerome Lewis	Sr
TE	87	Anthony Ritossa	Sr

Defense

Pos.	#	Name	Class
LB	1	Jatavis Brown	Jr
DB	2	Larry Hope (I)	So
S	4	Johnny Robinson	Sr
LB	5	Justin March-Lillard	Sr
CB	6	DeAndre Scott	So
S	7	Devonte Morgan	Sr
DL	9	Keontae Hollis	Sr
DL	10	Richard Dorvilus	Jr
DL	11	Nordly Capi	Sr
LB	12	C. J. Mizell	Sr
DB	13	Wedley Charles	So
LB	14	Jerome Lane	Fr
S	15	Cory Morrow	So
CB	17	Donte Williams	Sr
CB	19	Drew Phillips	Sr
CB	20	Kyron Brown	Fr
CB	21	Kris Givens	Jr
CB	22	Mikee Hayes	Fr
S	23	Bre' Ford	Sr
DB	24	Jordan George	Fr
DB	25	A. J. Coney	Fr
CB	27	John Senter	Jr
CB	29	Bryce Cheek	Jr
DB	30	Bryan Green	So
S	31	Jamal Baggett	Fr
S	32	Martel Durant	Sr
DL	34	Jamal Marcus (I)	Jr
LB	35	Newman Williams	Fr
DL	36	Cody Grice	Jr
S	39	James Turner	Jr
S	41	Zach Guiser	Fr
DB	43	Nathan Bischof	Fr
LB	44	Nick Rossi	Sr
LB	51	Tevan Ray	Fr
LB	52	Jon Shelby	Sr
LB	54	Dylan Evans	Jr
DE	56	Deon'Tae Moore	Fr
LB	58	Andrew Hauser	So
LB	59	John Rachal	So
DL	63	Varnell Garrett	Sr
DL	79	Mike Davis	Jr
DL	90	Se'Von Pittman	So
DL	91	Rodney Coe	Jr
DL	92	Daryan Martin	So
DL	93	Lavonne Gauthney	Fr
DL	95	Darius Copeland	So
DL	96	Alfonso Horner	Jr
DL	97	Undrea Bullard	Fr
DL	98	Christopher Spruill	Fr
DL	99	Nmesoma Okafor	Sr

Special teams

Pos.	#	Name	Class
K	37	Tom O'Leary	Fr
P, K	38	Zach Paul	Jr
PK	43	Zach Gingerich	Fr
PK	48	Robert Stein	Jr
P	64	Kyle Foster	Fr
LS	65	Hayden Grover	Fr
LS	88	Michael Buddenberg	Fr

Head coach

- Terry Bowden

Coordinators/assistant coaches

- Chuck Amato (defensive coordinator / associate head coach)
- Jeff Bowden (special teams coordinator / outside receivers)
- A.J. Milwee (offensive coordinator / quarterbacks coach)
- Trent Boykin (running backs)
- John Pont (Recruiting coordinator / Inside Receivers)
- (offensive line)
- Todd Stroud (defensive line)
- Otis Mounds (Cornerbacks)
- Mike Woodford (Safeties)
- Brett Ekkens (offensive graduate assistant)
- Matt Gildersleeve (Director of Football Strength and Conditioning)
- Ben Murphy (Director of football operations)
- John Nemec (Director of player personnel)
- Mark Ouimet (assistant director of football operations)

Legend

- (C) Team captain
- (S) Suspended
- (I) Ineligible
- Injured
- Redshirt

Roster
Last update: December 20, 2016
