= 2014 Central Michigan Chippewas football team =

American college football season

2014 Central Michigan Chippewas football

Bahamas Bowl, L 48−49 vs. Western Kentucky
- Conference: Mid-American Conference
- West Division
- Record: 7–6 (5–3 MAC)
- Head coach: Dan Enos (5th season)
- Offensive coordinator: Morris Watts (1st season)
- Defensive coordinator: Joe Tumpkin (5th season)
- Home stadium: Kelly/Shorts Stadium

2014 Mid-American Conference football standings
	Conf.			Overall
Team	W		L	W		L
East Division
Bowling Green x	5	–	3	8	–	6
Ohio	4	–	4	6	–	6
Buffalo	3	–	4	5	–	6
Akron	3	–	5	5	–	7
UMass	3	–	5	3	–	9
Miami (OH)	2	–	6	2	–	10
Kent State	1	–	6	2	–	9
West Division
Northern Illinois xy$	7	–	1	11	–	3
Toledo x	7	–	1	9	–	4
Western Michigan	6	–	2	8	–	5
Central Michigan	5	–	3	7	–	6
Ball State	4	–	4	5	–	7
Eastern Michigan	1	–	7	2	–	10
Championship: Northern Illinois 51, Bowling Green 17
$ – Conference champion; x – Division champion/co-champions; y – Championship game participant

The 2014 Central Michigan Chippewas football team represented Central Michigan University in the 2014 NCAA Division I FBS football season. They were led by fifth-year head coach Dan Enos and played their home games at Kelly/Shorts Stadium. They were members of the West Division of the Mid-American Conference. They finished the season 7–6, 5–3 in MAC play to finish in fourth place in the West Division. They were invited to the inaugural Bahamas Bowl where they lost to Western Kentucky.

On January 22, 2015, head coach Dan Enos resigned to take the offensive coordinator position at Arkansas. He finished at CMU with a record of 26–36.

== Schedule ==
Date	Time	Opponent	Site	TV	Result	Attendance
August 28	7:00 pm	Chattanooga*	Kelly/Shorts Stadium; Mount Pleasant, MI	ESPN3	W 20–16	15,793
September 6	12:00 pm	at Purdue*	Ross–Ade Stadium; West Lafayette, IN	ESPNews	W 38–17	36,410
September 13	12:00 pm	Syracuse*	Kelly/Shorts Stadium; Mount Pleasant, MI	ESPNU	L 3–40	25,531
September 20	3:30 pm	at Kansas*	Memorial Stadium; Lawrence, KS	FSN	L 10–24	34,822
September 27	7:00 pm	at Toledo	Glass Bowl; Toledo, OH	ESPN3	L 28–42	18,087
October 4	3:30 pm	Ohio^{†}	Kelly/Shorts Stadium; Mount Pleasant, MI	ESPN3	W 28–10	18,223
October 11	5:00 pm	at Northern Illinois	Huskie Stadium; DeKalb, IL	ESPN3	W 34–17	20,122
October 18	3:30 pm	Ball State	Kelly/Shorts Stadium; Mount Pleasant, MI	ESPN3	L 29–32	13,337
October 25	3:30 pm	at Buffalo	UB Stadium; Amherst, NY	ESPN3	W 20–14	18,052
November 1	1:00 pm	at Eastern Michigan	Rynearson Stadium; Ypsilanti, MI (rivalry)	ESPN3	W 38–7	19,613
November 15	1:00 pm	Miami (OH)	Kelly/Shorts Stadium; Mount Pleasant, MI	ESPN3	W 34-27	7,689
November 22	1:00 pm	Western Michigan	Kelly/Shorts Stadium; Mount Pleasant, MI (rivalry)	ESPN3	L 20–32	17,265
December 24	11:00 am	vs. Western Kentucky*	Thomas Robinson Stadium; Nassau, Bahamas (Bahamas Bowl)	ESPN	L 48–49	13,667
*Non-conference game; ^{†}Homecoming; All times are in Eastern time

== Game summaries ==
=== Chattanooga ===
	1	2	3	4	Total
Mocs	3	13	0	0	16
Chippewas	0	7	13	0	20

=== At Purdue ===
	1	2	3	4	Total
Chippewas	14	7	7	10	38
Boilermakers	0	7	3	7	17

=== Syracuse ===
	1	2	3	4	Total
Orange	0	17	16	7	40
Chippewas	3	0	0	0	3

=== At Kansas ===
	1	2	3	4	Total
Chippewas	0	3	7	0	10
Jayhawks	7	0	3	14	24

=== At Toledo ===
	1	2	3	4	Total
Chippewas	7	0	14	7	28
Rockets	6	14	14	8	42

=== Ohio ===
	1	2	3	4	Total
Bobcats	0	3	0	7	10
Chippewas	14	0	7	7	28

=== At Northern Illinois ===
	1	2	3	4	Total
Chippewas	14	7	10	3	34
Huskies	7	0	10	0	17

=== Ball State ===
	1	2	3	4	Total
Cardinals	13	13	3	3	32
Chippewas	7	7	7	8	29

=== At Buffalo ===
	1	2	3	4	Total
Chippewas	7	7	0	6	20
Bulls	0	7	7	0	14

=== At Eastern Michigan ===
	1	2	3	4	Total
Chippewas	14	17	0	7	38
Eagles	0	0	0	7	7

=== Miami (OH) ===
	1	2	3	4	Total
RedHawks	0	13	7	7	27
Chippewas	7	6	14	7	34

=== Western Michigan ===
	1	2	3	4	Total
Broncos	0	22	3	7	32
Chippewas	14	3	0	3	20

=== Western Kentucky–Bahamas Bowl ===
	1	2	3	4	Total
Chippewas	7	7	0	34	48
Hilltoppers	21	21	7	0	49
