= 2014 Kent State Golden Flashes football team =

American college football season

2014 Kent State Golden Flashes football
- Conference: Mid-American Conference
- East Division
- Record: 2–9 (1–6 MAC)
- Head coach: Paul Haynes (2nd season)
- Offensive coordinator: Brian Rock (4th season)
- Offensive scheme: Spread
- Defensive coordinator: Brian George (2nd season)
- Base defense: 4–3
- Home stadium: Dix Stadium

2014 Mid-American Conference football standings
	Conf.			Overall
Team	W		L	W		L
East Division
Bowling Green x	5	–	3	8	–	6
Ohio	4	–	4	6	–	6
Buffalo	3	–	4	5	–	6
Akron	3	–	5	5	–	7
UMass	3	–	5	3	–	9
Miami (OH)	2	–	6	2	–	10
Kent State	1	–	6	2	–	9
West Division
Northern Illinois xy$	7	–	1	11	–	3
Toledo x	7	–	1	9	–	4
Western Michigan	6	–	2	8	–	5
Central Michigan	5	–	3	7	–	6
Ball State	4	–	4	5	–	7
Eastern Michigan	1	–	7	2	–	10
Championship: Northern Illinois 51, Bowling Green 17
$ – Conference champion; x – Division champion/co-champions; y – Championship game participant

The 2014 Kent State Golden Flashes football team represented Kent State University in the 2014 NCAA Division I FBS football season. They were led by second-year head coach Paul Haynes and played their home games at Dix Stadium as a member of the East Division of the Mid-American Conference. They finished the season 2–9, 1–6 in MAC play to finish in last place in the East Division. They only played 11 games due to their November 19 game vs Buffalo being canceled due to inclement weather.

== Schedule ==
Date	Time	Opponent	Site	TV	Result	Attendance
August 30	6:00 pm	Ohio	Dix Stadium; Kent, OH	ESPN3	L 14–17	22,754
September 6	2:00 pm	South Alabama*	Dix Stadium; Kent, OH	ESPN3	L 13–23	15,355
September 13	12:00 pm	at No. 22 Ohio State*	Ohio Stadium; Columbus, OH	ABC/ESPN2	L 0–66	104,404
September 27	3:30 pm	at Virginia*	Scott Stadium; Charlottesville, VA	ESPN3	L 13–45	33,526
October 4	5:00 pm	at Northern Illinois	Huskie Stadium; DeKalb, IL	ESPN3	L 14–17	15,620
October 11	2:00 pm	Massachusetts	Dix Stadium; Kent, OH	ESPN3	L 17–40	12,451
October 18	3:30 pm	Army*^{†}	Dix Stadium; Kent, OH	ESPN3	W 39–17	18,114
October 25	2:30 pm	at Miami (OH)	Yager Stadium; Oxford, OH	ESPN3	L 3–10	22,792
November 4	8:00 pm	Toledo	Dix Stadium; Kent, OH	ESPNU	L 20–30	7,471
November 12	8:00 pm	at Bowling Green	Doyt Perry Stadium; Bowling Green, OH (Battle for the Anniversary Award)	ESPN2	L 20–30	8,417
November 28	1:00 pm	Akron	Dix Stadium; Kent, OH	ESPN3	W 27–24	5,118
*Non-conference game; ^{†}Homecoming; Rankings from AP Poll released prior to the game; All times are in Eastern time

Schedule source:

^{^[a]}Hours before kickoff on November 19 against Buffalo, the officials postponed the game due to the inclement weather that dropped four feet of lake effect snow in the Buffalo, New York region. Game officials had soon reschedule the match up two days later at a new time, 1:00 p.m. Later it was announced that the two schools cancelled the game and would not reschedule.
