= 2014 MAC Championship Game =

2014 Marathon MAC Championship Game
- Conference Championship
Northern Illinois Huskies	Bowling Green Falcons
(10–2)	(7–5)
51	17
Head coach: Rod Carey	Head coach: Dino Babers
	1	2	3	4	Total
Northern Illinois	10	10	17	14	51
Bowling Green	0	10	0	7	17
- Date: December 5, 2014
- Season: 2014
- Stadium: Ford Field
- Location: Detroit, Michigan
- MVP: Drew Hare (QB, NIU)
- Favorite: Northern Illinois by 5
- Attendance: 15,110

United States TV coverage
- Network: ESPN2
- Announcers: Dave Flemming, Danny Kanell, & Allison Williams

2014 Mid-American Conference football standings
	Conf.			Overall
Team	W		L	W		L
East Division
Bowling Green x	5	–	3	8	–	6
Ohio	4	–	4	6	–	6
Buffalo	3	–	4	5	–	6
Akron	3	–	5	5	–	7
UMass	3	–	5	3	–	9
Miami (OH)	2	–	6	2	–	10
Kent State	1	–	6	2	–	9
West Division
Northern Illinois xy$	7	–	1	11	–	3
Toledo x	7	–	1	9	–	4
Western Michigan	6	–	2	8	–	5
Central Michigan	5	–	3	7	–	6
Ball State	4	–	4	5	–	7
Eastern Michigan	1	–	7	2	–	10
Championship: Northern Illinois 51, Bowling Green 17
$ – Conference champion; x – Division champion/co-champions; y – Championship game participant

The 2014 MAC Championship Game was played on Friday, December 5, 2014, and featured the East Division Champion Bowling Green Falcons and the West Division Champion Northern Illinois Huskies.

Bowling Green clinched the East Division early after their 30–20 victory over division-rival Kent State on November 12. The Falcons, however, lost their final two conference games against West division foes Toledo and Ball State to finish their conference schedule at 5–3, one game ahead of Ohio.

Northern Illinois used the entirety of the conference schedule to clinch the West Division on the season's final day with a 31–21 come-from-behind win over Western Michigan on November 28. The Huskies finished in a tie with Toledo at 7–1, but held the head-to-head tie-breaker after defeating the Rockets, 27–24, on November 11.

The 2014 game was a rematch of the 2013 game, won by Bowling Green, 47–27.

== History ==
Bowling Green's 2014 appearance in the contest marked their third trip to the Championship Game and second to Detroit.

In 2003, the Falcons, then ranked #20, lost to 13th-ranked Miami, 49–27, at Doyt Perry Stadium in Bowling Green (at that time, championship games were played at on-campus sites). They won the 2013 game in Detroit over then-ranked #14 Northern Illinois, 47–27, ending the Huskies' unbeaten season and their hopes for a BCS berth in the Fiesta Bowl.

With their loss in the 2014 contest, the Falcons are now 1–2 in MAC Championship Games, having won 11 MAC Championships (10 prior to the Championship Game Era).

Northern Illinois' 2014 appearance in the contest marked their fifth consecutive trip to Detroit, and sixth overall.

In 2005, the Huskies lost to Akron, 31–30, on a Zips touchdown with ten seconds left in the game. In 2010, the team, ranked #24 coming into the game, lost to Miami, 26–21. The 2011 contest saw the Huskies trailing Ohio, 20–0 at halftime, only to mount a furious comeback, capped by Mathew Sims' field goal as time expired for a 23–20 win. Northern repeated as champions in 2012, entering the game ranked #19 and defeating #18 Kent State, 44–37 in double overtime. The win earned the Huskies a berth in the Orange Bowl. In 2013, the Huskies were defeated by Bowling Green, 47–27, ending a 12-game undefeated streak and knocking NIU out of the BCS picture (with a win, the team would have earned a spot in the Fiesta Bowl).

With their win in the 2014 contest, the Huskies are now 3–3 in the MAC Championship Game, having won 4 MAC Championships (1 prior to the Championship Game Era).

== Scoring summary ==
1st quarter scoring:

NIU - Hare 5 run (Hagan kick)

NIU - Hagan 35 field goal

2nd quarter scoring:

NIU - Hagan 32 field goal

BGSU - Dieter 42 pass from Knapke (Tate kick)

NIU - Eakes 5 pass from Hare (Hagan kick)

BGSU - Tate 46 field goal

3rd quarter scoring:

NIU - Brescasin 4 pass from Hare (Hagan kick)

NIU - Stingily 2 run (Hagan kick)

NIU - Hagan 23 field goal

4th quarter scoring:

NIU - Stingily 2 run (Hagan kick)

BGSU - Greene 6 run (Tate kick)

NIU - Huff 2 run (Hagan kick)
