= 2014 Buffalo Bulls football team =

American college football season

2014 Buffalo Bulls football
- Conference: Mid-American Conference
- East Division
- Record: 5–6 (3–4 MAC)
- Head coach: Jeff Quinn (5th season; first 7 games); Alex Wood (interim; final 4 games)
- Offensive coordinator: Alex Wood (4th season)
- Offensive scheme: Multiple
- Defensive coordinator: Lou Tepper (3rd season)
- Base defense: 3–4
- Captains: Andre Davis; Joe Licata; Cortney Lester; Adam Redden; Trevor Sales; Lee Skinner; Kristjan Sokoli; Jake Stockman
- Home stadium: University at Buffalo Stadium

2014 Mid-American Conference football standings
	Conf.			Overall
Team	W		L	W		L
East Division
Bowling Green x	5	–	3	8	–	6
Ohio	4	–	4	6	–	6
Buffalo	3	–	4	5	–	6
Akron	3	–	5	5	–	7
UMass	3	–	5	3	–	9
Miami (OH)	2	–	6	2	–	10
Kent State	1	–	6	2	–	9
West Division
Northern Illinois xy$	7	–	1	11	–	3
Toledo x	7	–	1	9	–	4
Western Michigan	6	–	2	8	–	5
Central Michigan	5	–	3	7	–	6
Ball State	4	–	4	5	–	7
Eastern Michigan	1	–	7	2	–	10
Championship: Northern Illinois 51, Bowling Green 17
$ – Conference champion; x – Division champion/co-champions; y – Championship game participant

The 2014 Buffalo Bulls football team represented the University at Buffalo as a member of the Mid-American Conference (MAC) during the 2014 NCAA Division I FBS football season. Led by Jeff Quinn in his fifth and final year as head coach for the first seven games of the season and then by Alex Wood as interim head coach for the remainder of the season, the Bulls compiled an overall record of 5–6 with a mark of 3–4 in conference play, placing third in the MAC's East Division. The team played home games at the University at Buffalo Stadium in Amherst, New York.

Quinn was fired on October 13. Buffalo played on 11 games because a game with Kent State on November 19 was canceled due to inclement weather and never rescheduled, which cost the Bulls a chance at bowl eligibility.

== Schedule ==
Date	Time	Opponent	Site	TV	Result	Attendance
August 30	3:30 pm	Duquesne*	University at Buffalo Stadium; Amherst, NY	ESPN3	W 38–28	20,329
September 6	12:00 pm	at Army*	Michie Stadium; West Point, NY	CBSSN	L 39–47	28,643
September 12	8:00 pm	No. 8 Baylor*	University at Buffalo Stadium; Amherst, NY	ESPN	L 21–63	24,714
September 20	3:30 pm	Norfolk State*	University at Buffalo Stadium; Amherst, NY	ESPN3	W 36–7	21,139
September 27	3:30 pm	Miami (OH)^{†}	University at Buffalo Stadium; Amherst, NY	ESPN3	W 35–27	20,841
October 4	3:30 pm	at Bowling Green	Doyt Perry Stadium; Bowling Green, OH	ESPN3	L 35–36	17,185
October 11	1:00 pm	at Eastern Michigan	Rynearson Stadium; Ypsilanti, MI	ESPN3	L 27–37	11,886
October 25	3:30 pm	Central Michigan	University at Buffalo Stadium; Amherst, NY	ESPN3	L 14–20	18,052
November 5	8:00 pm	at Ohio	Peden Stadium; Athens, OH	ESPNU	L 14–37	15,405
November 11	8:00 pm	Akron	University at Buffalo Stadium; Amherst, NY	ESPNU	W 55–24	17,343
November 28	1:00 pm	at UMass	Warren McGuirk Alumni Stadium; Amherst, MA (rivalry)	ESPN3	W 41–21	13,417
*Non-conference game; ^{†}Homecoming; Rankings from AP Poll released prior to the game; All times are in Eastern time

^{^[a]}Hours before kickoff on November 19 against Kent State, the officials postponed the game due to the inclement weather that dropped four feet of lake effect snow in the region. Game officials had soon reschedule the match up two days later at a new time, 1:00 p.m. Later, it was announced that the two schools cancelled the game and would not reschedule due to the emergency situation.

== Game summaries ==
=== Duquesne ===
Duquesne @ Buffalo

Team	1	2	3	4	Total
Dukes	0	7	14	7	28
• Bulls	14	7	3	14	38

- Date: August 30
- Location: UB Stadium
  Amherst, NY
- Game start: 3:30 p.m. EDT
- Game attendance: 20,329
- Game weather: Weather: Sunny • Temperature: 87 • Wind: 5 mph
- Referee: Chris La Mange
- TV announcers (ESPN3): Jonathan Yardley & Vonnie Holliday

In their first game of the season, the Bulls won, 38–28 over the Duquesne Dukes.

Scoring summary

Quarter	Time	Drive			Team	Scoring information	Score	
Quarter	Time	Plays	Yards	TOP	Team	Scoring information	Duquesne	Buffalo
1	11:49	8	75	3:11	Buffalo	Matt Weiser 41-yard touchdown reception from Joe Licata, Patrick Clarke kick good	0	7
1	7:30	7	77	3:13	Buffalo	Anthone Taylor 11-yard touchdown run, Patrick Clarke kick good	0	14
2	5:24	9	37	3:45	Buffalo	Anthone Taylor 5-yard touchdown run, Patrick Clarke kick good	0	21
2	1:58	5	29	1:47	Duquesne	Devin Rahming 4-yard touchdown reception from Dillon Buechel, Austin Crimmins kick good	7	21
3	11:21	8	75	3:39	Duquesne	Randy Morris 3-yard touchdown run, Austin Crimmins kick good	14	21
3	7:04	3	93	1:21	Duquesne	Chris King 88-yard touchdown reception from Dillon Buechel, Austin Crimmins kick good	21	21
3	1:46	7	28	2:41	Buffalo	24-yard field goal by Patrick Clarke	21	24
4	14:55	6	75	1:51	Duquesne	Chris King 6-yard touchdown reception from Dillon Buechel, Austin Crimmins kick good	28	24
4	9:50	9	97	3:06	Buffalo	Ron Willoughby 24-yard touchdown reception from Joe Licata, Patrick Clarke kick good	28	31
4	1:32	16	75	6:34	Buffalo	Ron Willoughby 11-yard touchdown reception from Joe Licata, Patrick Clarke kick good	28	38
"TOP" = time of possession. For other American football terms, see Glossary of American football.							28	38

=== @ Army ===
Buffalo @ Army

Team	1	2	3	4	Total
Bulls	3	0	14	22	39
• Black Knights	7	14	13	13	47

- Date: September 6
- Location: Michie Stadium
  West Point, NY
- Game start: 12:00 p.m. EDT
- Game attendance: 28,643
- Game weather: Weather: Partly Cloudy • Temperature: 83 • Wind: WSW 7mph
- Referee: Jeff Flanagan
- TV announcers (CBSSN): Ben Holden, Kevin O'Connell, & Courtney Fallon

In their second game of the season, the Bulls lost, 47–39 to the Army Black Knights.

Scoring summary

Quarter	Time	Drive			Team	Scoring information	Score	
Quarter	Time	Plays	Yards	TOP	Team	Scoring information	Buffalo	Army
1	10:26	9	43	3:44	Buffalo	22-yard field goal by Patrick Clarke	3	0
1	4:20	11	75	6:06	Army	Larry Dixon 23-yard touchdown run, Daniel Grochowski kick good	3	7
2	10:41	7	80	4:07	Army	Tony Giovannelli 4-yard touchdown run, Daniel Grochowski kick good	3	14
2	0:22	2	8	0:12	Army	Raymond Maples 6-yard touchdown run, Daniel Grochowski kick good	3	21
3	6:04	1	45	0:09	Army	Larry Dixon 45-yard touchdown run, Daniel Grochowski kick good	3	28
3	4:17	4	62	1:40	Buffalo	Devon Hughes 20-yard touchdown reception from Joe Licata, Patrick Clarke kick good	10	28
3	3:30	2	42	0:42	Army	Terry Baggett 41-yard touchdown run, Daniel Grochowski kick blocked	10	34
3	1:54	4	78	1:28	Buffalo	Marcus McGill 65-yard touchdown reception from Joe Licata, Patrick Clarke kick good	17	34
4	12:01	11	75	4:53	Army	Angel Santiago 4-yard touchdown run, Daniel Grochowski kick blocked	17	40
4	11:10	2	33	0:33	Army	Matt Giachinta 4-yard touchdown run, Cale Brewer kick good	17	47
4	8:47	7	75	2:23	Buffalo	Devin Campbell 15-yard touchdown reception from Joe Licata, Patrick Clarke kick good	24	47
4	6:01	8	47	2:42	Buffalo	Marcus McGill 3-yard touchdown reception from Joe Licata, Patrick Clarke kick good	31	47
4	2:42	8	67	2:21	Buffalo	Devin Campbell 8-yard touchdown reception from Joe Licata, 2-point pass good	39	47
"TOP" = time of possession. For other American football terms, see Glossary of American football.							39	47

=== Baylor ===
Baylor @ Buffalo

Team	1	2	3	4	Total
• #8 Bears	21	14	14	14	63
Bulls	0	0	14	7	21

- Date: September 12
- Location: UB Stadium
  Amherst, NY
- Game start: 8:00 p.m. EDT
- Game attendance: 24,714
- Game weather: Weather: Mostly Cloudy • Temperature: 55 • Wind: 5 NE
- Referee: Greg Blum
- TV announcers (ESPN): Dave Flemming, Danny Kanell, & Allison Williams

In their third game of the season, the Bulls lost, 63–21 to the Baylor Bears.

Scoring summary

Quarter	Time	Drive			Team	Scoring information	Score	
Quarter	Time	Plays	Yards	TOP	Team	Scoring information	Baylor	Buffalo
1	10:28	12	66	4:32	Baylor	Shock Linwood 2-yard touchdown run, Chris Callahan kick good	7	0
1	8:44	2	91	0:34	Baylor	KD Cannon 89-yard touchdown reception from Bryce Petty, Chris Callahan kick good	14	0
1	5:15	5	58	1:13	Baylor	Shock Linwood 24-yard touchdown run, Chris Callahan kick good	21	0
2	14:09	10	86	2:11	Baylor	Jay Lee 30-yard touchdown reception from Bryce Petty, Chris Callahan kick good	28	0
2	5:17	7	58	1:50	Baylor	Johnny Jefferson 14-yard touchdown run, Chris Callahan kick good	35	0
3	9:31	6	58	2:56	Buffalo	Devon Hughes 41-yard touchdown reception from Joe Licata, Patrick Clarke kick good	35	7
3	7:46	7	60	1:40	Baylor	Lynx Hawthorne 18-yard touchdown reception from Bryce Petty, Kyle Peterson kick good	42	7
3	7:09	2	76	0:31	Buffalo	Anthone Taylor 41-yard touchdown run, Patrick Clarke kick good	42	14
3	5:08	6	62	1:53	Baylor	Jay Lee 14-yard touchdown reception from Bryce Petty, Kyle Peterson kick good	49	14
4	12:58	8	65	2:42	Baylor	Seth Russell 31-yard touchdown run, Kyle Peterson kick good	56	14
4	11:34	1	37	0:07	Baylor	Lynx Hawthorne 37-yard touchdown reception from Seth Russell, Chris Callahan kick good	63	14
4	6:24	9	74	5:05	Buffalo	Malcolm Robinson 17-yard touchdown reception from Tony Daniel, Patrick Clarke kick good	63	21
"TOP" = time of possession. For other American football terms, see Glossary of American football.							63	21

=== Norfolk State ===
Norfolk State @ Buffalo

Team	1	2	3	4	Total
Spartans	7	0	0	0	7
• Bulls	14	9	6	7	36

- Date: September 20
- Location: UB Stadium
  Amherst, NY
- Game start: 3:30 p.m. EDT
- Game attendance: 21,139
- Game weather: Weather: Clouds & Sun, Windy • Temperature: 76 • Wind: 20 SW
- Referee: Larry Smith
- TV announcers (ESPN3): Jim Barbar & Mickey Matthews

In their fourth game of the season, the Bulls won, 36–7 over the Norfolk State Spartans.

Scoring summary

Quarter	Time	Drive			Team	Scoring information	Score	
Quarter	Time	Plays	Yards	TOP	Team	Scoring information	Norfolk State	Buffalo
1	10:34	1	92	0:12	Buffalo	Devon Hughes 92-yard touchdown reception from Joe Licata, Patrick Clarke kick good	0	7
1	10:15	1	68	0:10	Norfolk State	Isaac White 68-yard touchdown reception from Terrance Ervin, Ryan Lee kick good	7	7
1	5:01	11	75	5:14	Buffalo	Devon Hughes 9-yard touchdown reception from Joe Licata, Patrick Clarke kick good	7	14
2	8:44	4	19	1:51	Buffalo	Ron Willoughby 3-yard touchdown reception from Joe Licata, 2-point run failed	7	20
2	0:05	8	8	2:39	Buffalo	39-yard field goal by Patrick Clarke	7	23
3	7:01	3	24	1:25	Buffalo	Joe Licata 1-yard touchdown run, 2-point pass failed	7	29
4	9:40	8	86	3:03	Buffalo	Ron Willoughby 86-yard touchdown reception from Tony Daniel, Patrick Clarke kick good	7	36
"TOP" = time of possession. For other American football terms, see Glossary of American football.							7	36

=== Miami (OH) ===
Miami (OH) @ Buffalo

Team	1	2	3	4	Total
RedHawks	7	7	7	6	27
• Bulls	14	0	12	9	35

- Date: September 27
- Location: UB Stadium
  Amherst, NY
- Game start: 3:30 p.m. EDT
- Game attendance: 20,841
- Game weather: Weather: Sunny • Temperature: 78 • Wind: N 6mph
- Referee: Jeff Servinski
- TV announcers (ESPN3): Doug Sherman & Je'Rod Cherry

In their fifth game of the season, the Bulls won, 35–27 over the Miami RedHawks.

Scoring summary

Quarter	Time	Drive			Team	Scoring information	Score	
Quarter	Time	Plays	Yards	TOP	Team	Scoring information	Miami (OH)	Buffalo
1	12:35	6	78	2:25	Miami (OH)	Jared Murphy 6-yard touchdown reception from Andrew Hendrix, Kaleb Patterson kick good	7	0
1	10:00	5	65	2:31	Buffalo	Jacob Martinez 9-yard touchdown reception from Joe Licata, Patrick Clarke kick good	7	7
1	3:21	11	80	5:06	Buffalo	Matt Weiser 31-yard touchdown reception from Joe Licata, Patrick Clarke kick good	7	14
2	7:18	2	54	0:53	Miami (OH)	Dawan Scott 61-yard touchdown run, Kaleb Patterson kick good	14	14
3	9:13	7	76	3:20	Miami (OH)	Jared Murphy 27-yard touchdown reception from Andrew Hendrix, Kaleb Patterson kick good	21	14
3	6:58	6	71	2:07	Buffalo	Anthone Taylor 13-yard touchdown run, Patrick Clarke kick failed	21	20
3	0:35	11	59	4:54	Buffalo	Anthone Taylor 3-yard touchdown run, 2-point pass failed	21	26
4	14:13	5	65	1:22	Miami (OH)	Alex Welch 32-yard touchdown reception from Andrew Hendrix, 2-point run failed	27	26
4	11:19	8	67	2:50	Buffalo	Anthone Taylor 1-yard touchdown run, 2-point run failed	27	32
4	6:28	8	40	4:19	Buffalo	37-yard field goal by Patrick Clarke	27	35
"TOP" = time of possession. For other American football terms, see Glossary of American football.							27	35

=== @ Bowling Green ===
Buffalo @ Bowling Green

Team	1	2	3	4	Total
Bulls	7	21	0	7	35
• Falcons	7	13	10	6	36

- Date: October 4
- Location: Doyt Perry Stadium
  Bowling Green, OH
- Game start: 3:30 p.m. EDT
- Game attendance: 17,185
- Game weather: Weather: Cloudy/Windy • Temperature: 47 • Wind: WSW 19
- Referee: Jeff Maconaghy
- Television network: ESPN3

In their sixth game of the season, the Bulls lost, 36–35 to the Bowling Green Falcons.

Scoring summary

Quarter	Time	Drive			Team	Scoring information	Score	
Quarter	Time	Plays	Yards	TOP	Team	Scoring information	Buffalo	Bowling Green
1	5:36	15	75	9:24	Buffalo	Joe Licata 1-yard touchdown run, Patrick Clarke kick good	7	0
1	2:43	11	75	2:52	Bowling Green	Travis Greene 4-yard touchdown run, Tyler Tate kick good	7	7
2	13:56	5	40	1:28	Bowling Green	32-yard field goal by Tyler Tate	7	10
2	11:29	5	70	5:06	Buffalo	Ron Willoughby 16-yard touchdown reception from Joe Licata, Patrick Clarke kick good	14	10
2	8:52	10	65	2:37	Bowling Green	James Knapke 1-yard touchdown run, Tyler Tate kick good	14	17
2	6:50	4	57	2:04	Buffalo	Anthone Taylor 8-yard touchdown run, Patrick Clarke kick good	21	17
2	2:02	6	39	3:43	Buffalo	Anthone Taylor 1-yard touchdown run, Patrick Clarke kick good	28	17
2	0:19	7	47	1:35	Bowling Green	35-yard field goal by Tyler Tate	28	20
3	13:24	4	57	1:29	Bowling Green	Ronnie Moore 9-yard touchdown reception from James Knapke, Tyler Tate kick good	28	27
3	8:07	10	65	2:57	Bowling Green	31-yard field goal by Tyler Tate	28	30
4	8:38	9	69	3:58	Buffalo	Anthone Taylor 12-yard touchdown run, Patrick Clarke kick good	35	30
4	2:19	4	80	0:45	Bowling Green	Fred Coppet 4-yard touchdown run, 2-point pass failed	35	36
"TOP" = time of possession. For other American football terms, see Glossary of American football.							35	36

=== @ Eastern Michigan ===
Buffalo @ Eastern Michigan

Team	1	2	3	4	Total
Bulls	7	3	3	14	27
• Eagles	0	3	13	21	37

- Date: October 11
- Location: Rynearson Stadium
  Ypsilanti, MI
- Game start: 1:00 p.m. EDT
- Game attendance: 11,886
- Game weather: Weather: Mostly Sunny • Temperature: 57 • Wind: 8 ENE
- Referee: Thomas McCabe
- TV announcers (ESPN3): Dan Gutowsky & Mickey Matthews

In their seventh game of the season, the Bulls lost, 37–27 to the Eastern Michigan Eagles.

Scoring summary

Quarter	Time	Drive			Team	Scoring information	Score	
Quarter	Time	Plays	Yards	TOP	Team	Scoring information	Buffalo	Eastern Michigan
1	2:53	3	75	1:14	Buffalo	Marcus McGill 24-yard touchdown reception from Joe Licata, Patrick Clarke kick good	7	0
2	9:24	12	91	6:30	Buffalo	24-yard field goal by Patrick Clarke	10	0
2	0:56	11	70	3:19	Eastern Michigan	21-yard field goal by Dylan Mulder	10	3
3	14:21	2	75	0:39	Eastern Michigan	Reggie Bell 71-yard touchdown run, Dylan Mulder kick blocked	10	9
3	11:22	8	20	2:59	Buffalo	40-yard field goal by Patrick Clarke	13	9
3	3:00	7	53	2:12	Eastern Michigan	Ryan Brumfield 1-yard touchdown run, Dylan Mulder kick good	13	16
4	11:38	4	50	1:42	Eastern Michigan	Reggie Bell 10-yard touchdown run, Dylan Mulder kick good	13	23
4	11:16	2	23	0:14	Eastern Michigan	David Gibson 23-yard touchdown reception from Reggie Bell, Dylan Mulder kick good	13	30
4	4:52	3	62	5:06	Buffalo	Matt Weiser 50-yard touchdown reception from Joe Licata, Patrick Clarke kick good	20	30
4	2:25	2	74	0:57	Eastern Michigan	Reggie Bell 72-yard touchdown run, Dylan Mulder kick good	20	37
4	0:44	7	75	1:41	Buffalo	Devon Hughes 4-yard touchdown reception from Joe Licata, Patrick Clarke kick good	27	37
"TOP" = time of possession. For other American football terms, see Glossary of American football.							27	37

=== Central Michigan ===
Central Michigan @ Buffalo

Team	1	2	3	4	Total
• Chippewas	7	7	0	6	20
Bulls	0	7	7	0	14

- Date: October 25
- Location: UB Stadium
  Amherst, NY
- Game start: 3:30 p.m. EDT
- Game attendance: 18,052
- Game weather: Weather: Cloudy, showers • Temperature: 59 • Wind: WSW 24
- Referee: Larry Smith
- Television network: ESPN3

In their eighth game of the season, the Bulls lost, 20–14 to the Central Michigan Chippewas.

Scoring summary

Quarter	Time	Drive			Team	Scoring information	Score	
Quarter	Time	Plays	Yards	TOP	Team	Scoring information	Central Michigan	Buffalo
1	10:36	9	75	4:24	Central Michigan	Saylor Lavallii 4-yard touchdown run, Brian Eavey kick good	7	0
2	10:35	7	57	3:15	Central Michigan	Saylor Lavallii 9-yard touchdown run, Brian Eavey kick good	14	0
2	1:49	11	67	4:37	Buffalo	Ron Willoughby 28-yard touchdown reception from Joe Licata, Patrick Clarke kick good	14	7
3	13:43	3	23	1:06	Buffalo	Malcolm Robinson 6-yard touchdown reception from Joe Licata, Patrick Clarke kick good	14	14
4	8:08	16	98	9:29	Central Michigan	Titus Davis 7-yard touchdown reception from Cooper Rush, Brian Eavey kick failed	20	14
"TOP" = time of possession. For other American football terms, see Glossary of American football.							20	14

=== @ Ohio ===
Buffalo @ Ohio

Team	1	2	3	4	Total
Bulls	0	0	7	7	14
• Bobcats	10	7	10	10	37

- Date: November 5
- Location: Peden Stadium
  Athens, OH
- Game start: 8:00 p.m. EST
- Game attendance: 15,405
- Game weather: Weather: Cloudy, rain • Temperature: 52 • Wind: S,2mph
- Referee: Mark Kluczynski
- TV announcers (ESPNU): Jason Benetti & Rene Ingoglia

In their ninth game of the season, the Bulls lost, 37–14 to the Ohio Bobcats.

Scoring summary

Quarter	Time	Drive			Team	Scoring information	Score	
Quarter	Time	Plays	Yards	TOP	Team	Scoring information	Buffalo	Ohio
1	11:11	8	64	3:49	Ohio	33-yard field goal by Josiah Yazdani	0	3
1	6:08	4	22	1:40	Ohio	A. J. Ouellette 2-yard touchdown run, Josiah Yazdani kick good	0	10
2	9:12	8	80	3:46	Ohio	A.J. Ouellette 1-yard touchdown run, Josiah Yazdani kick good	0	17
3	12:25	4	6	1:29	Ohio	28-yard field goal by Josiah Yazdani	0	20
3	11:57	3	9	0:18	Ohio	Derrius Vick 9-yard touchdown run, Josiah Yazdani kick good	0	27
3	3:54	4	19	1:30	Buffalo	Ron Willoughby 12-yard touchdown reception from Joe Licata, Patrick Clarke kick good	7	27
4	12:57	14	64	5:57	Ohio	19-yard field goal by Josiah Yazdani	7	30
4	9:18	5	10	2:36	Ohio	Dorian Brown 3-yard touchdown run, Josiah Yazdani kick good	7	37
4	1:16				Buffalo	Fumble recovery returned 75 yards for touchdown by Boise Ross, Patrick Clarke kick good	14	37
"TOP" = time of possession. For other American football terms, see Glossary of American football.							14	37

=== Akron ===
Akron @ Buffalo

Team	1	2	3	4	Total
Zips	7	3	7	7	24
• Bulls	14	13	14	14	55

- Date: November 11
- Location: UB Stadium
  Amherst, NY
- Game start: 8:00 p.m. EST
- Game attendance: 17,343
- Game weather: Weather: Cloudy • Temperature: 60 • Wind: 12 SW
- Referee: Tony Cannella
- TV announcers (ESPNU): Mark Neely & Ray Bentley

In their tenth game of the season, the Bulls won, 55–24 over the Akron Zips.

Scoring summary

Quarter	Time	Drive			Team	Scoring information	Score	
Quarter	Time	Plays	Yards	TOP	Team	Scoring information	Akron	Buffalo
1	14:37				Akron	Interception returned 37 yards for touchdown by DeAndre Scott, Robert Stein kick good	7	0
1	4:59	12	80	5:34	Buffalo	Matt Weiser 33-yard touchdown reception from Jordan Johnson, Patrick Clarke kick good	7	7
1	0:02	7	80	3:29	Buffalo	Devin Campbell 6-yard touchdown reception from Joe Licata, Patrick Clarke kick good	7	14
2	9:30	9	58	4:21	Buffalo	Tony Daniel 21-yard touchdown run, Patrick Clarke kick good	7	21
2	5:14	10	59	4:16	Akron	33-yard field goal by Robert Stein	10	21
2	0:15	6	60	1:58	Buffalo	Jacob Martinez 17-yard touchdown reception from Joe Licata, Patrick Clarke kick failed	10	27
3	9:33	16	75	5:27	Akron	Cody Grice 1-yard touchdown run, Robert Stein kick good	17	27
3	6:42	4	61	2:48	Buffalo	Ron Willoughby 42-yard touchdown reception from Joe Licata, Patrick Clarke kick good	17	34
3	6:20	1	24	0:06	Buffalo	Devin Campbell 24-yard touchdown reception from Joe Licata, Patrick Clarke kick good	17	41
4	12:37	12	81	5:31	Buffalo	Anthone Taylor 6-yard touchdown run, Patrick Clarke kick good	17	48
4	9:41	8	45	2:49	Akron	Jawon Chisholm 1-yard touchdown run, Robert Stein kick good	24	48
4	1:43	5	25	2:44	Buffalo	Jordan Johnson 16-yard touchdown run, Patrick Clarke kick good	24	55
"TOP" = time of possession. For other American football terms, see Glossary of American football.							24	55

=== Kent State ===
Kent State @ Buffalo

Team	1	2	3	4	Total
Golden Flashes	0	0	0	0	0
Bulls	0	0	0	0	0

- Date: TBD-Postponed due to inclement weather.
- Location: UB Stadium
  Amherst, NY
- Game start: 8:00 EST
- TV announcers (ESPNU): Mike Couzens & Rocky Boiman

The November 19 game between Kent State and Buffalo was initially postponed due to inclement weather and was never rescheduled. The cancellation eliminated Buffalo from bowl eligibility.

Scoring summary

Quarter	Time	Drive			Team	Scoring information	Score	
Quarter	Time	Plays	Yards	TOP	Team	Scoring information	Kent State	Buffalo
"TOP" = time of possession. For other American football terms, see Glossary of American football.								

=== @ UMass ===
Buffalo @ UMass

Team	1	2	3	4	Total
• Bulls	0	13	21	7	41
Minutemen	0	0	7	14	21

- Date: November 28
- Location: Warren McGuirk Alumni Stadium
  Hadley, MA
- Game start: 1:00 p.m. EST
- Game attendance: 13,417
- Game weather: Weather: Partly Cloudy • Temperature: 33 • Wind: W 9 mph
- Referee: Don Willard
- TV announcers (ESPN3): John Brickley & Ken Dunek

In their 11th game of the season, the Bulls won, 41–21, over the UMass Minutemen.

Scoring summary

Quarter	Time	Drive			Team	Scoring information	Score	
Quarter	Time	Plays	Yards	TOP	Team	Scoring information	Buffalo	Massachusetts
2	3:10	17	99	8:03	Buffalo	Devon Hughes 28-yard touchdown reception from Joe Licata, Patrick Clarke kick good	7	0
2	0:12	6	68	0:57	Buffalo	Jacob Martinez 31-yard touchdown reception from Joe Licata, Patrick Clarke kick failed	13	0
3	10:30	6	71	3:10	Buffalo	Ron Willoughby 22-yard touchdown reception from Joe Licata, Patrick Clarke kick good	20	0
3	9:50	3	66	0:40	Massachusetts	Marken Michel 50-yard touchdown run, Blake Lucas kick good	20	7
3	6:43	7	39	3:07	Buffalo	Devon Hughes 4-yard touchdown reception from Joe Licata, Patrick Clarke kick good	27	7
3	1:54	8	72	3:41	Buffalo	Anthone Taylor 3-yard touchdown run, Patrick Clarke kick good	34	7
4	10:50	17	70	6:04	Massachusetts	Tajae Sharpe 7-yard touchdown reception from Austin Whipple, Blake Lucas kick good	34	14
4	3:19	2	80	0:53	Buffalo	Anthone Taylor 76-yard touchdown run, Patrick Clarke kick good	41	14
4	1:17	5	77	2:02	Massachusetts	Tajae Sharpe 24-yard touchdown reception from Austin Whipple, Blake Lucas kick good	41	21
"TOP" = time of possession. For other American football terms, see Glossary of American football.							41	21

== After the season ==
=== NFL draft ===
The following Bull was selected in the 2015 NFL draft following the season.

Round	Pick	Player	Position	NFL club
6	214	Kristjan Sokoli	Defensive tackle	Seattle Seahawks

.
