= 2014 UMass Minutemen football team =

American college football season

2014 UMass Minutemen football
- Conference: Mid-American Conference
- East Division
- Record: 3–9 (3–5 MAC)
- Head coach: Mark Whipple (7th season)
- Offensive scheme: Pro-style
- Defensive coordinator: Tom Masella (3rd season)
- Base defense: 3–4
- Home stadium: Gillette Stadium; Warren McGuirk Alumni Stadium

2014 Mid-American Conference football standings
	Conf.			Overall
Team	W		L	W		L
East Division
Bowling Green x	5	–	3	8	–	6
Ohio	4	–	4	6	–	6
Buffalo	3	–	4	5	–	6
Akron	3	–	5	5	–	7
UMass	3	–	5	3	–	9
Miami (OH)	2	–	6	2	–	10
Kent State	1	–	6	2	–	9
West Division
Northern Illinois xy$	7	–	1	11	–	3
Toledo x	7	–	1	9	–	4
Western Michigan	6	–	2	8	–	5
Central Michigan	5	–	3	7	–	6
Ball State	4	–	4	5	–	7
Eastern Michigan	1	–	7	2	–	10
Championship: Northern Illinois 51, Bowling Green 17
$ – Conference champion; x – Division champion/co-champions; y – Championship game participant

The 2014 UMass Minutemen football team represented the University of Massachusetts Amherst in the 2014 NCAA Division I FBS football season. This was their first year with head coach Mark Whipple, who returned after 10 years coaching in the NFL. The Minutemen divided their home schedule between two stadiums. Three home games were played at Gillette Stadium in Foxborough, Massachusetts. The other three were played on the UMass campus at Warren McGuirk Alumni Stadium, which reopened after a renovation to bring the facility up to FBS standards. This season was UMass's third in the Mid-American Conference in the East Division. They finished the season 3–9, 3–5 in MAC play to finish in a tie for fourth place in the East Division.

== Schedule ==
Date	Time	Opponent	Site	TV	Result	Attendance
August 30	3:00 p.m.	Boston College*	Gillette Stadium; Foxborough, MA (rivalry)	ESPN3	L 7–30	30,479
September 6	3:00 p.m.	Colorado*	Gillette Stadium; Foxborough, MA	ESPN3	L 38–41	10,227
September 13	12:00 p.m.	at Vanderbilt*	Vanderbilt Stadium; Nashville, TN	ESPN+	L 31–34	33,386
September 20	4:00 p.m.	at Penn State*	Beaver Stadium; University Park, PA	BTN	L 7–48	99,155
September 27	3:00 p.m.	Bowling Green^{†}	Warren McGuirk Alumni Stadium; Hadley, MA	ESPN3	L 42–47	17,000
October 4	2:30 p.m.	at Miami (OH)	Yager Stadium; Oxford, OH	ESPN3	L 41–42	15,970
October 11	2:00 p.m.	at Kent State	Dix Stadium; Kent, OH	ESPN3	W 40–17	12,451
October 18	3:00 p.m.	Eastern Michigan	Gillette Stadium; Foxborough, MA	ESPN3	W 36–14	12,030
October 25	2:00 p.m.	at Toledo	Glass Bowl; Toledo, OH	ESPN3	L 35–42	20,104
November 12	8:00 p.m.	Ball State	Warren McGuirk Alumni Stadium; Hadley, MA	ESPNU	W 24–10	13,374
November 18	8:00 p.m.	at Akron	InfoCision Stadium; Akron, OH	ESPNU	L 6–30	5,571
November 28	1:00 p.m.	Buffalo	Warren McGuirk Alumni Stadium; Hadley, MA (rivalry)	ESPN3	L 21–41	13,417
*Non-conference game; ^{†}Homecoming; All times are in Eastern time

== Game summaries ==
=== Boston College ===
	1	2	3	4	Total
Eagles	0	6	14	10	30
Minutemen	0	0	7	0	7

=== Colorado ===
	1	2	3	4	Total
Buffaloes	3	17	14	7	41
Minutemen	7	14	10	7	38

=== Vanderbilt ===
	1	2	3	4	Total
Minutemen	14	10	7	0	31
Commodores	0	20	0	14	34

=== Penn State ===
	1	2	3	4	Total
Minutemen	0	0	0	7	7
Nittany Lions	6	28	14	0	48

=== Bowling Green ===
	1	2	3	4	Total
Falcons	10	16	7	14	47
Minutemen	7	14	14	7	42

=== Miami (OH) ===
	1	2	3	4	Total
Minutemen	14	27	0	0	41
RedHawks	0	21	7	14	42

=== Kent State ===
	1	2	3	4	Total
Minutemen	7	17	3	13	40
Golden Flashes	3	7	7	0	17

=== Eastern Michigan ===
	1	2	3	4	Total
Eagles	7	7	0	0	14
Minutemen	13	17	6	0	36

=== Toledo ===
	1	2	3	4	Total
Minutemen	13	7	0	15	35
Rockets	7	7	14	14	42

=== Ball State ===
	1	2	3	4	Total
Cardinals	7	0	3	0	10
Minutemen	7	10	0	7	24

=== Akron ===
	1	2	3	4	Total
Minutemen	0	0	6	0	6
Zips	10	10	7	3	30

=== Buffalo ===
	1	2	3	4	Total
Bulls	0	13	21	7	41
Minutemen	0	0	7	14	21
