= 2014 Ball State Cardinals football team =

American college football season

2014 Ball State Cardinals football
- Conference: Mid-American Conference
- West Division
- Record: 5–7 (4–4 MAC)
- Head coach: Pete Lembo (4th season)
- Offensive coordinator: Joey Lynch (1st season)
- Offensive scheme: Spread
- Defensive coordinator: Kevin Kelly (1st season)
- Base defense: 4–3
- Home stadium: Scheumann Stadium

2014 Mid-American Conference football standings
	Conf.			Overall
Team	W		L	W		L
East Division
Bowling Green x	5	–	3	8	–	6
Ohio	4	–	4	6	–	6
Buffalo	3	–	4	5	–	6
Akron	3	–	5	5	–	7
UMass	3	–	5	3	–	9
Miami (OH)	2	–	6	2	–	10
Kent State	1	–	6	2	–	9
West Division
Northern Illinois xy$	7	–	1	11	–	3
Toledo x	7	–	1	9	–	4
Western Michigan	6	–	2	8	–	5
Central Michigan	5	–	3	7	–	6
Ball State	4	–	4	5	–	7
Eastern Michigan	1	–	7	2	–	10
Championship: Northern Illinois 51, Bowling Green 17
$ – Conference champion; x – Division champion/co-champions; y – Championship game participant

The 2014 Ball State Cardinals football team represented Ball State University in the 2014 NCAA Division I FBS football season. They were led by fourth-year head coach Pete Lembo and played their home games at Scheumann Stadium. They were a member of the West Division of the Mid-American Conference. They finished the season 5–7, 4–4 in MAC play to finish in fifth place in the West Division.

== Schedule ==
Date	Time	Opponent	Site	TV	Result	Attendance
August 30	2:00 pm	Colgate*	Scheumann Stadium; Muncie, IN	ESPN3	W 30–10	9,659
September 6	3:30 pm	at Iowa*	Kinnick Stadium; Iowa City, IA	ESPN2	L 13–17	64,210
September 13	3:00 pm	Indiana State*	Scheumann Stadium; Muncie, IN (Blue Key Victory Bell)	ESPN3	L 20–27	15,860
September 20	7:00 pm	at Toledo	Glass Bowl; Toledo, OH	ESPN3	L 23–34	17,229
October 4	12:00 pm	at Army*	Michie Stadium; West Point, NY	CBSSN	L 24–33	31,384
October 11	3:00 pm	Western Michigan^{†}	Scheumann Stadium; Muncie, IN	ESPN3	L 38–42	11,237
October 18	3:30 pm	at Central Michigan	Kelly/Shorts Stadium; Mount Pleasant, MI	ESPN3	W 32–29	13,337
October 25	2:00 pm	Akron	Scheumann Stadium; Muncie, IN	ESPN3	W 35–21	7,617
November 5	8:00 pm	Northern Illinois	Scheumann Stadium; Muncie, IN (Bronze Stalk Trophy)	ESPN2	L 21–35	6,642
November 12	8:00 pm	at Massachusetts	Warren McGuirk Alumni Stadium; Hadley, MA	ESPNU	L 10–24	13,374
November 22	2:00 pm	Eastern Michigan	Scheumann Stadium; Muncie, IN	ESPN3	W 45–30	5,317
November 28	1:00 pm	at Bowling Green	Doyt Perry Stadium; Bowling Green, OH	ESPN3	W 41–24	8,534
*Non-conference game; ^{†}Homecoming; All times are in Eastern time
