= 2014 Miami RedHawks football team =

American college football season

2014 Miami RedHawks football
- Conference: Mid-American Conference
- East Division
- Record: 2–10 (2–6 MAC)
- Head coach: Chuck Martin (1st season)
- Co-offensive coordinators: George Barnett (1st season); Eric Koehler (1st season)
- Offensive scheme: Multiple
- Defensive coordinator: Matt Pawlowski (1st season)
- Base defense: 4–3
- Home stadium: Yager Stadium

2014 Mid-American Conference football standings
	Conf.			Overall
Team	W		L	W		L
East Division
Bowling Green x	5	–	3	8	–	6
Ohio	4	–	4	6	–	6
Buffalo	3	–	4	5	–	6
Akron	3	–	5	5	–	7
UMass	3	–	5	3	–	9
Miami (OH)	2	–	6	2	–	10
Kent State	1	–	6	2	–	9
West Division
Northern Illinois xy$	7	–	1	11	–	3
Toledo x	7	–	1	9	–	4
Western Michigan	6	–	2	8	–	5
Central Michigan	5	–	3	7	–	6
Ball State	4	–	4	5	–	7
Eastern Michigan	1	–	7	2	–	10
Championship: Northern Illinois 51, Bowling Green 17
$ – Conference champion; x – Division champion/co-champions; y – Championship game participant

The 2014 Miami RedHawks football team represented Miami University in the 2014 NCAA Division I FBS football season. They were led by first-year head coach Chuck Martin and played their home games at Yager Stadium and competed as a member of the East Division of the Mid-American Conference. They finished the season 2–10, 2–6 in MAC play to finish in sixth place in the East Division.

== Schedule ==
Date	Time	Opponent	Site	TV	Result	Attendance
August 30	3:30 p.m.	Marshall*	Yager Stadium; Oxford, OH	ESPN3	L 27–42	19,005
September 6	3:30 p.m.	Eastern Kentucky*	Yager Stadium; Oxford, OH	ESPN3	L 10–17	16,670
September 13	3:30 p.m.	at Michigan*	Michigan Stadium; Ann Arbor, MI	BTN	L 10–34	102,824
September 20	7:00 p.m.	at Cincinnati*	Paul Brown Stadium; Cincinnati, OH (Victory Bell)	CBSSN	L 24–31	41,926
September 27	3:30 p.m.	at Buffalo	University at Buffalo Stadium; Amherst, NY	ESPN3	L 27–35	20,841
October 4	2:30 p.m.	UMass	Yager Stadium; Oxford, OH	ESPN3	W 42–41	15,970
October 11	2:00 p.m.	at Akron	InfoCision Stadium; Akron, OH	ESPN3	L 19–29	8,223
October 18	5:00 p.m.	at Northern Illinois	Huskie Stadium; DeKalb, IL	ESPN3	L 41–51	11,211
October 25	2:30 p.m.	Kent State	Yager Stadium; Oxford, OH	ESPN3	W 10–3	22,792
November 1	2:30 p.m.	Western Michigan^{†}	Yager Stadium; Oxford, OH	ESPN3	L 10–41	9,045
November 15	1:00 p.m.	at Central Michigan	Kelly/Shorts Stadium; Mount Pleasant, MI	ESPN3	L 27–34	7,689
November 25	7:00 p.m.	Ohio	Yager Stadium; Oxford, OH (Battle of the Bricks)	ESPN2	L 21–24	11,956
*Non-conference game; ^{†}Homecoming; All times are in Eastern time
