= Conner Creek Academy East/Michigan Collegiate =

Charter school system in Michigan, US

Conner Creek Academy East (CCAE)/Michigan Collegiate (MC) is a charter school system in Metro Detroit. The elementary school component, Conner Creek Academy East, is in Roseville (). The middle/high school component, Michigan Collegiate Middle and High School, is in Warren (). Ferris State University charters Conner Creek, and also charters Michigan Collegiate.

== History ==
In 1999 Conner Creek Academy East was established. and also charters Michigan Collegiate. Previously Conner Creek Academy East was K-12 and had three campuses in Roseville: one K-6, one 7-8, and one 9-12. The charter school was using rented buildings to house its students.

The charter system planned to establish a new middle school and high school on a 19-acre (7.7 ha) plot of land north of 13 Mile Road and east of Ryan Road in Warren. Groundbreaking began by December 2007. The 61,000 square feet (5,700 m^{2}) facility had a price of $60 million. Charles Meredith, the superintendent of the charter system, stated that there were plans for 450 students at the new school. Officials from the City of Warren government opposed the building of the new school since it would not generate tax revenue and it was not combined with an element that would generate taxes; schools are exempt from local taxes. Some area residents opposed the idea, believing it would damage property values and add traffic. In addition, The Macomb Daily stated that the Warren Consolidated Schools, the school district in which the new charter building is located, "stands to lose thousands of dollars in state funding for every student who leaves the district" and that the new charter campus "poses a closer financial threat" to the district. The Warren campus opened with the name Conner Creek Academy – East, with high school students arriving in January 2008 and middle school students arriving in the fall of 2008. The high school was later renamed Michigan Collegiate Academy.

== Demographics ==
As of 2007, of the middle and high students at Conner Creek Academy East, about 30% resided in Macomb County and about 70% lived in Detroit. The Macomb Daily wrote that of the middle and high students "Only a handful call Oakland County home."
