= 2015 Outback Bowl =

- 29th Outback Bowl
| Auburn Tigers | Wisconsin Badgers |
| (8–4) | (10–3) |
| SEC | Big Ten |
| 31 | 34 |
| Head coach: Gus Malzahn | Head coach: Barry Alvarez (interim) |
| AP / Coaches / CFP; 19 / 19 / 19 | AP / Coaches / CFP; 17 / 17 / 18 |
| | 1 | 2 | 3 | 4 | OT | Total |
|---|---|---|---|---|---|---|
| Auburn | 7 | 7 | 3 | 14 | 0 | 31 |
| Wisconsin | 7 | 0 | 14 | 10 | 3 | 34 |
- Date: January 1, 2015
- Season: 2014
- Stadium: Raymond James Stadium
- Location: Tampa, Florida
- MVP: Wisconsin RB Melvin Gordon
- Favorite: Auburn by 7
- Referee: Mike Defee (Big XII)
- Attendance: 44,023

United States TV coverage
- Network: ESPN2/Touchdown Radio
- Announcers: Bob Wischusen, Matt Millen, and Quint Kessenich; Frank Fangie, Gino Torretta, and K.C. Jones
- Nielsen ratings: 3.3 (6.42M)

The 2015 Outback Bowl was an American college football bowl game that was played on 1 January 2015 at Raymond James Stadium in Tampa, Florida. It was the 29th edition of the Outback Bowl (previously called the Hall of Fame Bowl) and featured the #17 Wisconsin Badgers from the Big Ten and the #19 Auburn Tigers from the SEC. It was one of the 2014-15 bowl games that concluded the 2014 FBS football season. It kicked off at Noon EST and was nationally televised by ESPN2. It was sponsored by the Outback Steakhouse restaurant franchise.

== Teams ==
Both teams are dominant rushing teams with both being ranked in the top 12 rushing in the nation and both teams' starting running backs led their respective conferences in rushing statistics. At the end of the 2014 season, Auburn running back, Cameron Artis-Payne, had 1,608 rushing yards and 13 touchdowns while Wisconsin running back, Melvin Gordon, had 2,336 rushing yards and 26 touchdowns. Auburn comes into this game with an 8–4 record and Wisconsin has a 10–3 record.

The game has a promising aspect, being one of only two bowl games with AP top 20 teams, besides the College Football Playoff Bowls on New Years Day. ESPN ranked the Outback Bowl the second best non CFP game to watch, only behind the Belk Bowl between Georgia and Louisville taking place on December 30, 2014.

The last time Auburn and Wisconsin met on the field was in the 2006 Capital One Bowl. Barry Alvarez, in his last game serving as head coach, led Wisconsin to a 24–10 victory over Tommy Tuberville-led Auburn.

=== Auburn ===
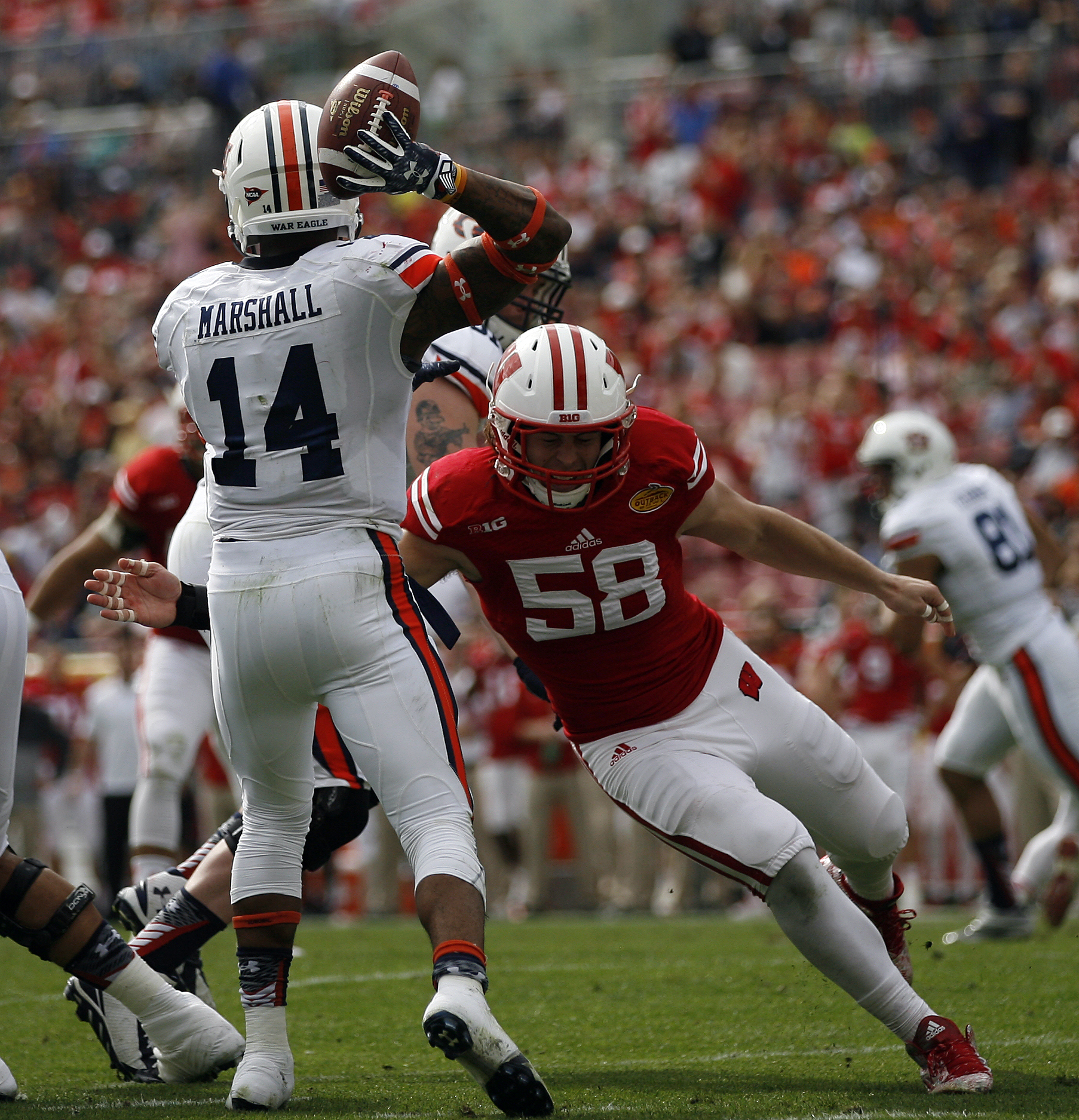
Auburn quarterback Nick Marshall during the game

After starting the season 5–0 and being ranked as high as #2 in the country, Auburn dropped 4 of their last 7 games and finished with an 8–4 record. They finished their regular season by losing the Iron Bowl by two scores, after leading at halftime by seven over the Alabama Crimson Tide, ranked #1 in the nation. The Tigers' best win came at then #4 Ole Miss who would make a College Football Playoff New Year's Six bowl by being selected for the Peach Bowl. The Tigers are led by quarterback Nick Marshall, who led the team to a National Championship Game at the end of the 2013 NCAA Division I FBS football season. Auburn players honored fallen teammate Jakell Mitchell by adorning their helmets with stickers displaying his jersey number 31.

=== Wisconsin ===
The Badgers lost their 1st game to LSU 28–24. They then lost two more games including to Ohio State in the Big Ten Championship Game. The Badgers had key wins, however, over very good teams like Minnesota and Nebraska which propelled them to the Big Ten Championship. The Badgers were led by running back Heisman-finalist Melvin Gordon who set the NCAA all-time record for single game rushing yards against Nebraska only to have it broken the following week. Head coach Gary Andersen left the Badgers to accept the head coaching position at Oregon State prior to this game. Wisconsin was coached in the 2015 Outback Bowl by University of Wisconsin Athletic Director Barry Alvarez.

== Game summary ==
=== Scoring summary ===
Scoring summary

| Quarter | Time | Drive | | | Team | Scoring information | Score | |
| Quarter | Time | Plays | Yards | TOP | Team | Scoring information | AUB | WIS |
|---|---|---|---|---|---|---|---|---|
| 1 | 11:10 | 5 | 89 | 2:10 | WISC | Corey Clement 7-yard touchdown reception from Joel Stave, Rafael Gaglianone kick good | 0 | 7 |
| 1 | 2:16 | 8 | 58 | 2:46 | AUB | Cameron Artis-Payne 2-yard touchdown run, Daniel Carlson kick good | 7 | 7 |
| 2 | 8:01 | 2 | 67 | 0:40 | AUB | Ricardo Louis 66-yard touchdown reception from Nick Marshall, Daniel Carlson kick good | 14 | 7 |
| 3 | 12:09 | 6 | 75 | 2:51 | WISC | Melvin Gordon 25-yard touchdown run, Rafael Gaglianone kick good | 14 | 14 |
| 3 | 9:42 | 8 | 42 | 2:37 | AUB | 51-yard field goal by Daniel Carlson | 17 | 14 |
| 3 | 0:20 | 6 | 73 | 3:16 | WISC | Melvin Gordon 53-yard touchdown run, Rafael Gaglianone kick good | 17 | 21 |
| 4 | 11:21 | 9 | 81 | 3:59 | AUB | C. J. Uzomah 20-yard touchdown reception from Nick Marshall, Daniel Carlson kick good | 24 | 21 |
| 4 | 7:58 | 7 | 70 | 3:23 | WISC | Melvin Gordon 6-yard touchdown run, Rafael Gaglianone kick good | 24 | 28 |
| 4 | 2:55 | 10 | 71 | 5:03 | AUB | Cameron Artis-Payne 2-yard touchdown run, Daniel Carlson kick good | 31 | 28 |
| 4 | 0:07 | 13 | 64 | 2:48 | WISC | 29-yard field goal by Rafael Gaglianone | 31 | 31 |
| OT | | 7 | 18 | – | WISC | 25-yard field goal by Rafael Gaglianone | 31 | 34 |
| "TOP" = time of possession. For other American football terms, see Glossary of American football. | | | | | | | 31 | 34 |

=== Statistics ===
| Statistics | AUB | WIS |
|---|---|---|
| First downs | 21 | 31 |
| Plays–yards | 66–435 | 81–521 |
| Rushes–yards | 43–219 | 54–400 |
| Passing yards | 216 | 121 |
| Passing: Comp–Att–Int | 16–23–0 | 14–27–3 |
| Time of possession | 26:56 | 33:04 |
