= 2014 Wisconsin Badgers football team =

American college football season

2014 Wisconsin Badgers football

Big Ten West Division champion Outback Bowl champion

Big Ten Championship, L 0–59 vs. Ohio State

Outback Bowl, W 34–31 ^{OT} vs. Auburn
- Conference: Big Ten Conference
- West Division

Ranking
- Coaches: No. 13
- AP: No. 13
- Record: 11–3 (7–1 Big Ten)
- Head coach: Gary Andersen (2nd season; regular season); Barry Alvarez (interim; bowl game)
- Offensive coordinator: Andy Ludwig (2nd season)
- Offensive scheme: Pro-style
- Defensive coordinator: Dave Aranda (2nd season)
- Base defense: 3–4
- MVP: Melvin Gordon
- Captain: (selected by game)
- Home stadium: Camp Randall Stadium

2014 Big Ten Conference football standings
	Conf.			Overall
Team	W		L	W		L
East Division
No. 1 Ohio State x$#^	8	–	0	14	–	1
No. T–5 Michigan State	7	–	1	11	–	2
Maryland	4	–	4	7	–	6
Rutgers	3	–	5	8	–	5
Michigan	3	–	5	5	–	7
Penn State	2	–	6	7	–	6
Indiana	1	–	7	4	–	8
West Division
No. 13 Wisconsin x	7	–	1	11	–	3
Minnesota	5	–	3	8	–	5
Nebraska	5	–	3	9	–	4
Iowa	4	–	4	7	–	6
Illinois	3	–	5	6	–	7
Northwestern	3	–	5	5	–	7
Purdue	1	–	7	3	–	9
Championship: Ohio State 59, Wisconsin 0
# – College Football Playoff champion; ^ – College Football Playoff participant; $ – Conference champion; x – Division champion/co-champions; Rankings from AP Poll

The 2014 Wisconsin Badgers football team represented the University of Wisconsin–Madison in the 2014 NCAA Division I FBS football season. The Badgers were led by second-year head coach Gary Andersen, were members of the new West Division of the Big Ten Conference, and played their home games at Camp Randall Stadium. They finished the season 11–3, 7–1 in Big Ten play to be champions of the West Division. As champions of the West Division, they played East Division champions Ohio State in the Big Ten Championship Game where they lost 59–0.

Several days after the Big Ten Championship game in early December, head coach Gary Andersen stepped down to become the head coach at Oregon State of the Pac-12 Conference. Athletic director and former Badger head coach Barry Alvarez was the interim head coach for the Outback Bowl against Auburn, a 34–31 overtime victory on New Year's Day in Tampa, Florida.

== Recruiting ==
College recruiting (2014)
Name	Hometown	School	Height	Weight	40^{‡}	Commit date
Beau Benzschawel; OL	Grafton, WI	Grafton HS	6 ft 5 in (1.96 m)	280 lb (130 kg)	5.2	Oct 24, 2013
Beau Benzschawel; OL	Recruit ratings: Scout: Rivals: 247Sports: ESPN:					
Taiwan Deal; RB	Capitol Heights, MD	DeMatha HS	6 ft 1 in (1.85 m)	225 lb (102 kg)	N/A	Jun 25, 2013
Taiwan Deal; RB	Recruit ratings: Scout: Rivals: 247Sports: ESPN:					
Michael Deiter; OL	Curtice, OH	Genoa HS	6 ft 5 in (1.96 m)	310 lb (140 kg)	N/A	Jun 24, 2013
Michael Deiter; OL	Recruit ratings: Scout: Rivals: 247Sports: ESPN:					
D'Cota Dixon; CB	Oak Hill, FL	New Smyrna Beach HS	5 ft 11 in (1.80 m)	190 lb (86 kg)	N/A	Feb 5, 2014
D'Cota Dixon; CB	Recruit ratings: Scout: Rivals: 247Sports: ESPN:					
T. J. Edwards; OLB	Lake Villa, IL	Lakes Community HS	6 ft 0 in (1.83 m)	230 lb (100 kg)	N/A	Nov 27, 2013
T. J. Edwards; OLB	Recruit ratings: Scout: Rivals: 247Sports: ESPN:					
Lubern Figaro; S	Everett, MA	Everett HS	6 ft 1 in (1.85 m)	185 lb (84 kg)	N/A	Sep 25, 2013
Lubern Figaro; S	Recruit ratings: Scout: Rivals: 247Sports: ESPN:					
Rafael Gaglianone; K	São Paulo, Brazil	Baylor School	6 ft 0 in (1.83 m)	220 lb (100 kg)	N/A	Nov 17, 2013
Rafael Gaglianone; K	Recruit ratings: Scout: Rivals: 247Sports: ESPN:					
Jaden Gault; OL	Cottage Grove, WI	Monona HS	6 ft 6 in (1.98 m)	310 lb (140 kg)	N/A	Aug 18, 2012
Jaden Gault; OL	Recruit ratings: Scout: Rivals: 247Sports: ESPN:					
D.J. Gillins; QB	Jacksonville, FL	Ribault HS	6 ft 3 in (1.91 m)	185 lb (84 kg)	N/A	Jul 8, 2013
D.J. Gillins; QB	Recruit ratings: Scout: Rivals: 247Sports: ESPN:					
Billy Hirschfeld; DL	Okauchee, WI	Arrowhead HS	6 ft 6 in (1.98 m)	270 lb (120 kg)	N/A	May 15, 2013
Billy Hirschfeld; DL	Recruit ratings: Scout: Rivals: 247Sports: ESPN:					
Austin Hudson; S	Tampa, FL	Plant HS	6 ft 2 in (1.88 m)	190 lb (86 kg)	N/A	Jun 27, 2013
Austin Hudson; S	Recruit ratings: Scout: Rivals: 247Sports: ESPN:					
Natrell Jamerson; WR	Ocala, FL	Vanguard HS	6 ft 0 in (1.83 m)	175 lb (79 kg)	N/A	Nov 20, 2013
Natrell Jamerson; WR	Recruit ratings: Scout: Rivals: 247Sports: ESPN:					
Chris Jones; WR	Baltimore, MD	DeMatha HS	6 ft 2 in (1.88 m)	190 lb (86 kg)	N/A	Sep 18, 2013
Chris Jones; WR	Recruit ratings: Scout: Rivals: 247Sports: ESPN:					
Micah Kapoi; OL	Kapolei, HI	Kapolei, HS	6 ft 4 in (1.93 m)	305 lb (138 kg)	N/A	Dec 1, 2013
Micah Kapoi; OL	Recruit ratings: Scout: Rivals: 247Sports: ESPN:					
Caleb Kinlaw; RB	Goose Creek, SC	Goose Creek HS	5 ft 9 in (1.75 m)	190 lb (86 kg)	N/A	Nov 14, 2013
Caleb Kinlaw; RB	Recruit ratings: Scout: Rivals: 247Sports: ESPN:					
Jacob Maxwell; OL	Greendale, WI	Greendale HS	6 ft 6 in (1.98 m)	280 lb (130 kg)	N/A	Nov 27, 2013
Jacob Maxwell; OL	Recruit ratings: Scout: Rivals: 247Sports: ESPN:					
George Panos; OL	Heartland, WI	Arrowhead HS	6 ft 5 in (1.96 m)	290 lb (130 kg)	N/A	Apr 28, 2012
George Panos; OL	Recruit ratings: Scout: Rivals: 247Sports: ESPN:					
Jeremy Patterson; DL	Screven, GA	Wayne County HS	6 ft 3 in (1.91 m)	285 lb (129 kg)	N/A	Oct 26, 2013
Jeremy Patterson; DL	Recruit ratings: Scout: Rivals: 247Sports: ESPN:					
George Rushing III; WR	Miramar, FL	Cardinal Gibbons HS	6 ft 1 in (1.85 m)	180 lb (82 kg)	4.5	Feb 3, 2013
George Rushing III; WR	Recruit ratings: Scout: Rivals: 247Sports: ESPN:					
Krenwick Sanders; WR	Jesup, GA	Wayne County HS	6 ft 2 in (1.88 m)	190 lb (86 kg)	N/A	Oct 8, 2013
Krenwick Sanders; WR	Recruit ratings: Scout: Rivals: 247Sports: ESPN:					
Conor Sheehy; DL	Milwaukee, WI	Marquette HS	6 ft 4 in (1.93 m)	275 lb (125 kg)	N/A	Sep 5, 2013
Conor Sheehy; DL	Recruit ratings: Scout: Rivals: 247Sports: ESPN:					
Derrick Tindal; CB	Fort Lauderdale, FL	Boyd Anderson HS	5 ft 11 in (1.80 m)	180 lb (82 kg)	N/A	Jan 24, 2014
Derrick Tindal; CB	Recruit ratings: Scout: Rivals: 247Sports: ESPN:					
Ula Tolutau; FB	Glendale, UT	Salt Lake City East HS	6 ft 2 in (1.88 m)	235 lb (107 kg)	N/A	May 16, 2013
Ula Tolutau; FB	Recruit ratings: Scout: Rivals: 247Sports: ESPN:					
Serge Trezy; S	Orlando, FL	Eastern Arizona	6 ft 1 in (1.85 m)	200 lb (91 kg)	N/A	Dec 12, 2013
Serge Trezy; S	Recruit ratings: Scout: Rivals: 247Sports: ESPN:					
Dareian Watkins; WR	Galion, OH	Galion HS	6 ft 1 in (1.85 m)	200 lb (91 kg)	N/A	Nov 30, 2013
Dareian Watkins; WR	Recruit ratings: Scout: Rivals: 247Sports: ESPN:					
Overall recruit ranking: Scout: 29 Rivals: 33 247Sports: 33 ESPN: 34
‡ Refers to 40-yard dash; Note: In many cases, Scout, Rivals, 247Sports, On3, and ESPN may conflict in their listings of height, weight and 40 time.; In these cases, the average was taken. ESPN grades are on a 100-point scale.; Sources: "Wisconsin Football Commitment List 2014". Rivals.; "Wisconsin Football Recruiting Commits 2014". Scout.; "Wisconsin Badgers Commits 2014". ESPN.; "Scout.com Team Recruiting Rankings". Scout.; "2014 Team Ranking". Rivals.com.

== Watchlists and preseason awards ==
- Melvin Gordon

Heisman Trophy
Maxwell Award
Doak Walker Award
Walter Camp Award

- Dan Voltz

Rimington Trophy

- Rob Havenstein

Outland Trophy
Lombardi Award

- Derek Watt

Allstate AFCA Good Works Team nominee

== Schedule ==
Date	Time	Opponent	Rank	Site	TV	Result	Attendance
August 30	8:00 p.m.	vs. No. 13 LSU*	No. 14	NRG Stadium; Houston, TX (Texas Kickoff)	ESPN	L 24–28	71,599
September 6	11:00 a.m.	Western Illinois*	No. 18	Camp Randall Stadium; Madison, WI	BTN	W 37–3	77,125
September 20	11:00 a.m.	Bowling Green*	No. 19	Camp Randall Stadium; Madison, WI	ESPN2	W 68–17	79,849
September 27	11:00 a.m.	South Florida*	No. 19	Camp Randall Stadium; Madison, WI	ESPNU	W 27–10	78,111
October 4	2:30 p.m.	at Northwestern	No. 17	Ryan Field; Evanston, IL	ESPN2	L 14–20	42,013
October 11	11:00 a.m.	Illinois		Camp Randall Stadium; Madison, WI	ESPN2	W 38–28	80,341
October 25	11:00 a.m.	Maryland^{†}		Camp Randall Stadium; Madison, WI	BTN	W 52–7	80,336
November 1	11:00 a.m.	at Rutgers		High Point Solutions Stadium; Piscataway, NJ	ESPN	W 37–0	52,797
November 8	11:00 a.m.	at Purdue	No. 25	Ross–Ade Stadium; West Lafayette, IN	ESPNU	W 34–16	35,068
November 15	2:30 p.m.	No. 16 Nebraska	No. 20	Camp Randall Stadium; Madison, WI (Freedom Trophy)	ABC	W 59–24	80,539
November 22	2:30 p.m.	at Iowa	No. 16	Kinnick Stadium; Iowa City, IA (Heartland Trophy)	ABC/ESPN2	W 26–24	68,610
November 29	2:30 p.m.	No. 18 Minnesota	No. 14	Camp Randall Stadium; Madison, WI (Paul Bunyan's Axe)	BTN	W 34–24	80,341
December 6	7:18 p.m.	vs. No. 5 Ohio State	No. 13	Lucas Oil Stadium; Indianapolis, IN (Big Ten Championship)	FOX	L 0–59	60,229
January 1, 2015	11:00 a.m.	vs. No. 19 Auburn*	No. 18	Raymond James Stadium; Tampa, FL (Outback Bowl)	ESPN2	W 34–31 ^{OT}	44,023
*Non-conference game; ^{†}Homecoming; Rankings from AP Poll and CFP Rankings after October 28 released prior to game; All times are in Central time

Schedule source:

== Rankings ==
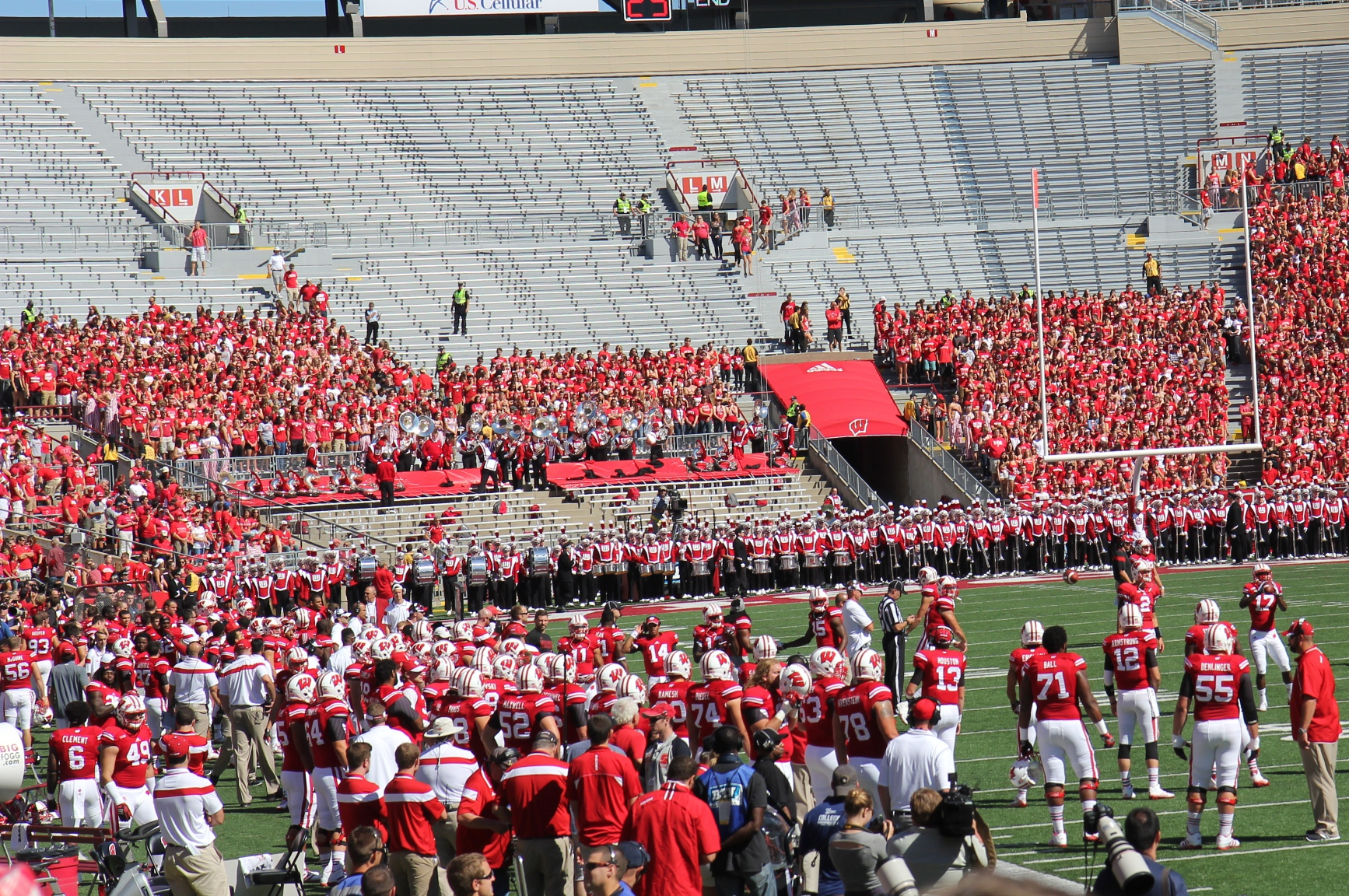
Camp Randall Stadium before Western Illinois game on September 6

Ranking movements Legend: ██ Increase in ranking ██ Decrease in ranking — = Not ranked RV = Received votes
	Week																
Poll	Pre	1	2	3	4	5	6	7	8	9	10	11	12	13	14	15	Final
AP	14	18	18	19	19	17	RV	RV	—	RV	25	22	14	14	11	17	13
Coaches	14	19	17	17	17	16	RV	RV	RV	RV	24	22	15	14	11	17	13
CFP	Not released									—	25	20	16	14	13	18	Not released

== Regular season games ==
=== #13 LSU ===
#13 LSU at #14 Wisconsin

Team	1	2	3	4	Total
• #13 Tigers	7	0	6	15	28
#14 Badgers	10	7	7	0	24

- Date: August 30
- Location: NRG Stadium
  Houston, TX
- Game start: 7:00 p.m. CDT
- Elapsed time: 3:28
- Game attendance: 71,599
- Game weather: Temperature: 72 °F (22 °C), Wind: Calm, Weather: N/A (Closed Roof)
- Referee: Mike Defee
- TV announcers (ESPN): Sean McDonough (Play-by-play), Chris Spielman (Color) & Todd McShay (Sideline)

Scoring summary
1	09:05	WIS	Love, Reggie 45 yd run (Gaglianone, R. kick)	7-0 WIS
1	05:07	WIS	Gaglianone, R. 51 yd field goal	10-0 WIS
1	04:47	LSU	Travin Dural 80 yd pass from A. Jennings (C. Delahoussaye kick)	10-7 WIS
2	07:36	WIS	Gordon, Melvin 14 yd run (Gaglianone, R. kick)	17-7 WIS
3	12:24	WIS	Clement, Corey 2 yd run (Gaglianone, R. kick)	24-7 WIS
3	07:41	LSU	C. Delahoussaye 30 yd field goal	24-10 WIS
3	02:11	LSU	C. Delahoussaye 47 yd field goal	24-13 WIS
4	12:08	LSU	John Diarse 36 yd pass from A. Jennings (Trey Quinn pass from A. Jennings)	24-21 WIS
4	09:41	LSU	Kenny Hilliard 28 yd run (C. Delahoussaye kick)	24-28 LSU

The Badgers started off the regular season with a neutral site game against the LSU Tigers in Houston, Texas.

The game was McEvoy's debut as a Wisconsin quarterback. His 34.16 passer rating was the worst for a Wisconsin quarterback since 1977 when Mike Kalasmiki's debut passer rating was 5.20. After the game McEvoy stated that he was "disgusted" with his performance and that he "obviously had a bad game". Wisconsin's new starting kicker, freshman Rafael Gaglianone, made his first career field goal with a 51-yarder in the first quarter; his celebratory dance after making the kick was covered by some sporting news sites such as Bleacher Report.

During the game Wisconsin's defensive tackle Konrad Zagzebski and defensive end Warren Herring sustained injuries. Zagzebski was taken off the field in the 1st quarter in a stretcher and taken to memorial hospital. Herring injured his knee in the 3rd quarter.

Statistical Leaders

- Rushing: Melvin Gordon – 16 Carries, 147 Yards, 1 Touchdown
- Passing: Tanner McEvoy – 8 Completions/24 Attempts for 50 Yards, 0 Touchdowns, 2 Interceptions
- Receiving: Alex Erickson – 3 Receptions, 33 Yards
- Defense: Michael Caputo – 10 Solo & 10 Assist Tackles, 0 TFL 0 Sacks

==== Postgame injuries and miscommunications ====
After the game, it was announced that three players would be out for weeks due to injuries. Defensive end Warren Herring had surgery on his right knee and is projected to be out for up to six weeks. Fullback Derek Watt had surgery on his right foot and is project to be out for eight weeks.

Joel Stave

After the LSU game a press release by Wisconsin's head coach, Gary Andersen announced that Joel Stave didn't play due to what was initially called a shoulder injury and that Stave was out indefinitely. Stave's shoulder injury stems from the 2014 Capital One Bowl where Stave sustained an AC-joint injury. After Stave claimed he wasn't injured but was dealing with "yips" as he called them Andersen retracted his statement that Stave was injured but still said Stave was "out indefinitely". Stave summed up the situation with "Right now, my arm is just not working the way I'd like it to, I don't know what it is. ... I've thrown how many thousands of balls in my life. I know when it hurts and when it doesn't. It just isn't right." With Stave out sophomore Bart Houston moved up to the #2 quarterback position with true freshman DJ Gillins the #3 quarterback.

Melvin Gordon

Andersen was criticized for Gordon only having three carries in the second half; when asked why he didn't play Gordon more in the second half Andersen stated that he "didn't know why Gordon had limited carries". Gordon stated to the media after the game that he wasn't injured. However, two days later Andersen stated that Gordon strained his hip-flexor on the last play in the 2nd quarter of the game against LSU and "we were trying to be smart with him as the rest of the game went on". He cited the hip-flexor injury as the reason why Gordon "pulled up" on his 63-yard run early in the 3rd quarter. Gordon stated that it was a "miscommunication" with the coaching staff and that "maybe I should have really let them know, let coach A know and stepped up and told them, 'Look, I need to be in there.' I kind of just sat back, and I put that on myself. I wasn't really forceful with it. I really wasn't demanding with it, and I probably should have been."

After the game, it was announced that fullback Derek Watt, defensive end Warren Herring would be out for weeks.

=== Western Illinois ===
Western Illinois at #18 Wisconsin

Team	1	2	3	4	Total
Leathernecks	0	3	0	0	3
• #18 Badgers	2	7	14	14	37

- Date: September 6
- Location: Camp Randall Stadium
  Madison, WI
- Game start: 11:00 a.m. CDT
- Elapsed time: 2:54
- Game attendance: 77,125
- Game weather: Temperature: 65 °F (18 °C), Wind NNW 6 mph, Weather: Sunny
- Referee: Mark Kluczynski
- TV announcers (BTN): Scott Graham (Play-by-play), Brandon Williams (Color) & Brooks Bollinger (Color)

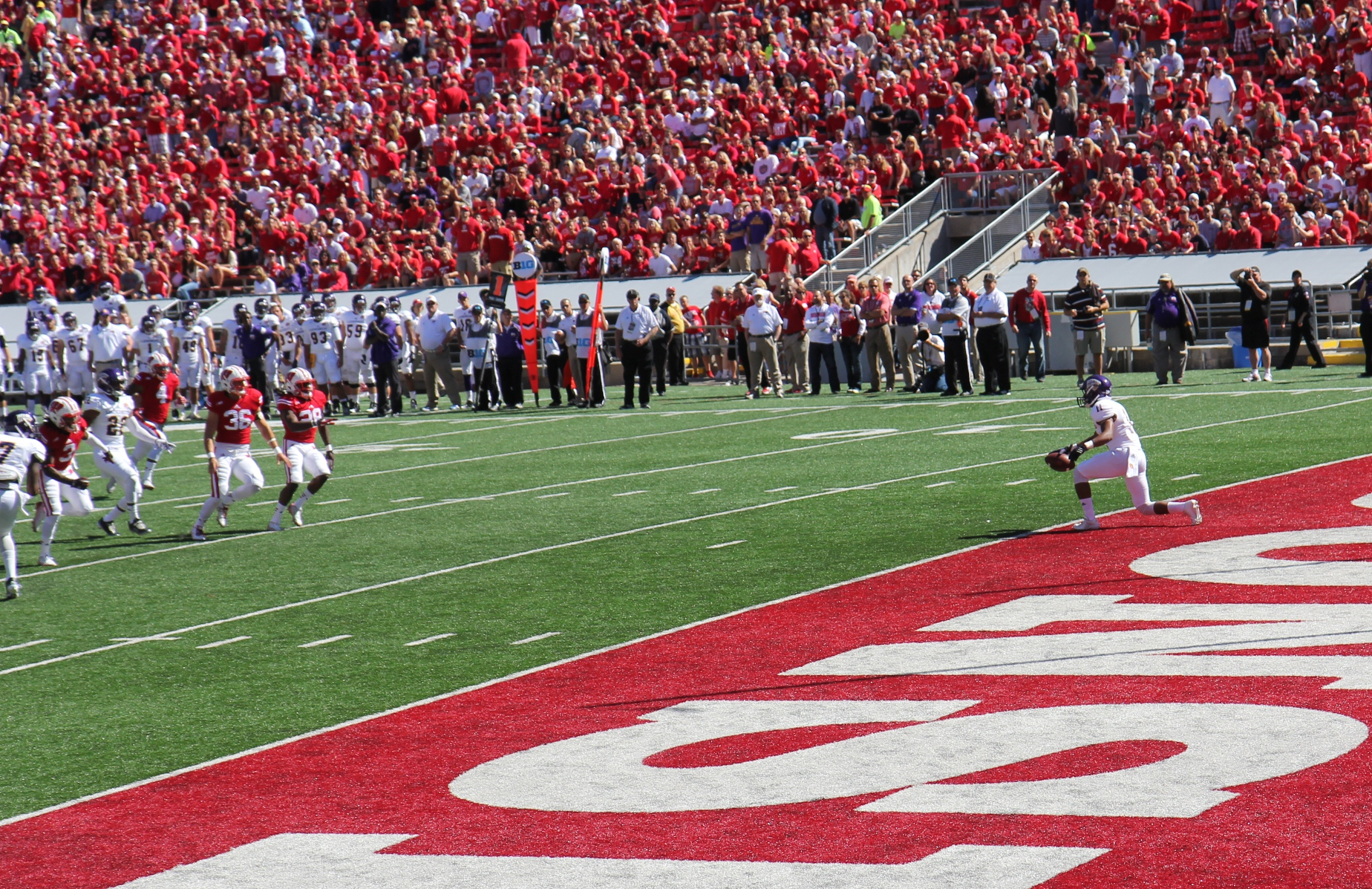
Quickest football score

The Badgers made the quickest score in the history of college football. In the opening kickoff, the Leathernecks kick returner stepped out of the end zone before returning and taking a knee the end zone for a safety. One second had elapsed off the clock.

Statistical Leaders

- Rushing: Tanner McEvoy – 9 Carries, 55 Yards, 1 Touchdown
- Passing: Tanner McEvoy – 23 Completions/28 Attempts for 283 Yards, 3 Touchdowns, 1 Interceptions
- Receiving: Alex Erickson – 10 Receptions, 122 Yards, 1 Touchdown
- Defense: Marcus Trotter - 6 Solo Tackles

=== Bowling Green ===
Bowling Green at #19 Wisconsin

Team	1	2	3	4	Total
Falcons	10	0	0	7	17
• #19 Badgers	14	27	21	6	68

- Date: September 20
- Location: Camp Randall Stadium
  Madison, WI
- Game start: 11:00 a.m. CDT
- Elapsed time: 3:29
- Game attendance: 79,849
- Game weather: 69 °F (21 °C), Wind: SSW 8 mph, Weather: Mostly Cloudy
- Referee: Michael Cannon
- TV announcers (ESPN2): Beth Mowins (Play-by-play), Joey Galloway (Color) & Paul Carcaterra (Sideline)

Melvin Gordon set a personal best against Bowling Green, rushing 253 yards on 13 carries for five touchdowns. Gordon also recorded his first career fumble as the ball was stripped by a Bowling Green defender after 322 career carries. Gordon was named the Big Ten Player of the Week for his performance against Bowling Green; he shared the honor with Nebraska Halfback Ameer Abdullah.

Statistical Leaders

- Rushing: Melvin Gordon – 13 Carries, 253 Yards (19.5 avg, 69 long), 5 Touchdowns
- Passing: Tanner McEvoy – 9 Completions/16 Attempts for 112 Yards, 1 Touchdowns, 1 Interceptions
- Receiving: Sam Arneson – 3 Receptions, 63 Yards, 1 Touchdown
- Defense: Derek Landisch – 6 Total Tackles (3 Solo, 3 Assist), 3.5 Tackles for Loss (20 yds), 1 Pass breakup, 2 Sacks (18 yds)

=== South Florida ===
USF at #19 Wisconsin

Team	1	2	3	4	Total
Bulls	3	0	7	0	10
• #19 Badgers	3	0	17	7	27

- Date: September 27
- Location: Camp Randall Stadium
  Madison, WI
- Game start: 11:00 a.m. CDT
- Elapsed time: 3:03
- Game attendance: 78,111
- Game weather: Temperature: 68 °F (20 °C), Wind: S 5 mph, Weather: Mostly Cloudy
- Referee: John McDaid
- TV announcers (ESPNU): Adam Amin (Play-by-play) & John Congemi (Color)

The game was the first time USF and Wisconsin had played one another. After a slow first half ending in USF and Wisconsin trading field goals Wisconsin exploded in the second half, scoring 24 points to USF's 7 resulting in a win for the Badgers.

Statistical Leaders

- Rushing: Melvin Gordon – 32 Carries, 181 Yards (5.7 avg, 43 long), 2 Touchdowns
- Passing: Tanner McEvoy – 11 Completions/18 Attempts for 160 Yards, 1 Touchdown
- Receiving: Alex Erickson – 6 Receptions, 91 Yards
- Defense: Sojourn Shelton – 5 Total Tackles (3 solo, 2 assist), 1 Pass Breakup

=== At Northwestern ===
#17 Wisconsin at Northwestern

Team	1	2	3	4	Total
#17 Badgers	0	0	7	7	14
• Wildcats	3	7	7	3	20

- Date: October 4
- Location: Ryan Field
  Evanston, IL
- Game start: 2:30 p.m. CDT
- Elapsed time: 3:16
- Game attendance: 42,013
- Game weather: Temperature: 44 °F (7 °C), Wind: W 14 mph, Weather: Rain Showers
- Referee: Ron Snodgrass
- TV announcers (ESPN2): Eamon McAnaney (Play-by-play), David Diaz-Infante (Color) & Dawn Davenport (Sideline)

Statistical Leaders

- Rushing: Melvin Gordon – 27 Carries, 259 Yards (9.6 avg, 61 long), 1 Touchdown
- Passing: Tanner McEvoy – 8 Completions/19 Attempts for 114 Yards, 1 Touchdown, 3 Interceptions
- Receiving: Alex Erickson – 4 Receptions, 45 Yards
- Defense: Michael Caputo – 11 Total tackles (8 Solo, 3 Assist), 1 Tackles for Loss (3 yds)

=== Illinois ===
Illinois at Wisconsin

Team	1	2	3	4	Total
Illini	14	0	0	14	28
• Badgers	7	17	7	7	38

- Date: October 11
- Location: Camp Randall Stadium
  Madison, WI
- Game start: 11:00 a.m. CDT
- Elapsed time: 3:17
- Game attendance: 80,341
- Game weather: Temperature: 46 °F (8 °C), Wind: NNE 5 mph, Weather: Sunny
- Referee: John O'Neill
- TV announcers (ESPN2): Beth Mowins (Play-by-play), Joey Galloway (Color) & Paul Carcaterra (Sideline)

Statistical Leaders

- Rushing: Melvin Gordon – 27 Carries, 175 Yards (6.5 avg, 46 long), 4 Touchdowns
- Passing: Joel Stave – 7 Completions/14 Attempts for 73 Yards
- Receiving: Sam Arneson – 4 Receptions, 48 Yards
- Defense: Leon Jacobs – 12 Total Tackles (8 Solo, 4 Assist), 2 Tackles for Loss (11 yds), 1.5 Sacks (10 yds)

=== Maryland ===
Maryland at Wisconsin

Team	1	2	3	4	Total
Terrapins	0	0	0	7	7
• Badgers	10	14	14	14	52

- Date: October 25
- Location: Camp Randall Stadium
  Madison, WI
- Game start: 11:00 a.m. CDT
- Elapsed time: 3:11
- Game attendance: 80,336
- Game weather: Temperature: 60 °F (16 °C), Wind: WNW 8 mph, Weather: Sunny
- Referee: Todd Geerlings
- TV announcers (BTN): Kevin Kugler (Play-by-play), Glen Mason (Color) & Lisa Byington (Sideline)

Statistical Leaders

- Rushing: Melvin Gordon – 22 Carries, 123 Yards (5.5 avg, 22 long), 3 Touchdowns
- Passing: Joel Stave – 9 Completions/15 Attempts for 155 Yards, 2 Touchdowns
- Receiving: Alex Erickson – 5 Receptions, 121 Yards, 1 Touchdown
- Defense: Derek Landisch – 8 Total Tackles (7 Solo, 1 Assist), 2 Tackles for Loss (6 yds)

=== At Rutgers ===
Wisconsin at Rutgers

Team	1	2	3	4	Total
• Badgers	7	13	10	7	37
Scarlet Knights	0	0	0	0	0

- Date: November 1
- Location: High Point Solutions Stadium
  Piscataway, NJ
- Game start: 11:00 a.m. CDT
- Elapsed time: 3:21
- Game attendance: 52,797
- Game weather: Temperature: 46 °F (8 °C), Wind: N 12 mph, Weather: Steady Rain
- Referee: Shawn Smith
- TV announcers (ESPN): Dave Pasch (Play-by-play), Brian Griese (Color) & Tom Luginbill (Sideline)

Wisconsin recorded its first road shutout since 1998 against the Scarlet Knights. Wisconsin's Defensive Coordinator, Dave Aranda was named Coordinator of the Week by Athlon Sports Wisconsin's runningback Corey Clement, a New Jersey native, was named Big Ten Offensive Player of the Week.

Statistical Leaders

- Rushing: Corey Clement – 14 Carries, 134 Yards (9.4 avg, 43 long), 2 Touchdowns
- Passing: Joel Stave – 7 Completions/16 Attempts for 81 Yards
- Receiving: George Rushing – 2 Receptions, 32 Yards
- Defense: Michael Caputo – 7 Total Tackles (3 Solo, 4 Assist), 1 Tackle for Loss (1 yd)

=== At Purdue ===
#25 Wisconsin at Purdue

Team	1	2	3	4	Total
• #25 Badgers	7	17	7	3	34
Boilermakers	3	3	10	0	16

- Date: November 9
- Location: Ross–Ade Stadium
  West Lafayette, IN
- Game start: 11:00 a.m. CST
- Elapsed time: 3:21
- Game attendance: 35,068
- Game weather: Temperature: 46 °F (8 °C), Wind: NNW 11 mph, Weather: Cloudy
- Referee: Mike Cannon
- TV announcers (ESPNU): Adam Amin (Play-by-play) & John Congemi (Color)

Badgers Sophomore linebacker Vince Biegel was named Big Ten Defensive Player of the Week as a result of his performance against the Boilermakers.

Statistical Leaders

- Rushing: Melvin Gordon – 25 Carries, 209 Yards (8.2 avg, 47 long), 1 Touchdown
- Passing: Joel Stave – 19 Completions/29 Attempts for 219 Yards, 2 Touchdowns
- Receiving: Jordan Frederick – 5 Receptions, 64 Yards
- Defense: Vince Biegel – 7 Total Tackles (6 Solo, 1 Assist), 4 Tackles for Loss (22 yd), 3 Sacks (19 yds), 1 Pass Breakup

=== #11 Nebraska ===
#11 Nebraska at #22 Wisconsin

Team	1	2	3	4	Total
#11 Cornhuskers	10	7	0	7	24
• #22 Badgers	3	21	28	7	59

- Date: November 15
- Location: Camp Randall Stadium
  Madison, WI
- Game start: 2:30 p.m. CST
- Elapsed time: 3:34
- Game attendance: 80,539
- Game weather: Temperature: 26 °F (−3 °C), Wind: West 5 mph, Weather: Overcast
- Referee: John O'Neill
- TV announcers (ABC/ESPN3): Sean McDonough (Play-by-play), Chris Spielman (Color) & Todd McShay (Sideline)

Prior to the game it was announced by both the Nebraska and Wisconsin athletic departments that the two teams would now play for the Freedom Trophy. The game was referred to as a showdown between two Big Ten runningback Heisman Trophy candidates; Nebraska's Ameer Abdullah and Wisconsin's Melvin Gordon.

Through the 2014 season Nebraska was only allowing an average of 117.0 yards rushing per game against FBS opponents, ranked 15th in the nation; the Cornhuskers rushing offense was tenth in the country averaging 280.7 rushing yards per game. Wisconsin's defense was only allowing an average of 99.5 yards rushing per game, ranked 5th in the nation; the Badgers rushing offense were fifth in the country averaging 325.7 rushing yards per game.

The game started off with three costly turnovers for the Badgers quickly leading to the Cornhuskers being up 17–3 at the start of the second quarter, two of the turnovers were fumbles by Melvin Gordon. The Badgers then scored 56 unanswered points before Nebraska answered with a final touchdown at the end of the fourth quarter. The Badgers defense held Nebraska to just 180 total yards of offense for the game and managed to contain Ameer Abdullah to just 69 rushing yards on 18 attempts; meanwhile the Badgers offense totaled 627 yards of offense, 591 rushing and 46 passing. As a result, Wisconsin moved into first place in the Big Ten's West Division.

During the game Melvin Gordon set the FBS single game rushing record with 408 rushing yards. Gordon accomplished this, as well as scoring four rushing touchdowns, in only three quarters of play. The previous mark of 406 yards was set by LaDainian Tomlinson and had stood as a record since 1999. Along the way he also broke the Wisconsin Badgers single game rushing record of 339 yards, formerly held by Ron Dayne; the Big Ten single game rushing record of 377 yards by Indiana's Anthony Thompson. Gordon rushed for more than 39 yards on six plays. Prior to the matchup Nebraska's defense had only allowed three runs of more than 35 yards.

Two Badgers players were named Big Ten Player of the Week with Melvin Gordon being named offensive Player of the Week and Joe Schobert defensive Player of the Week.

Statistical Leaders

- Rushing: Melvin Gordon – 25 Carries, 408 Yards (16.3 avg, 68 long), 4 Touchdowns
- Passing: Joel Stave – 7 Completions/11 Attempts for 46 Yards, 1 Touchdown
- Receiving: Kenzel Doe – 2 Receptions, 16 Yards
- Defense: Joe Schobert - 11 Tackles, 2.5 TFL, 0.5 Sack, 1 Fumble recovery and Marcus Trotter - 12 Tackles, 1 TFL, 1 Sack, 1 Fumble recovery

=== At Iowa ===
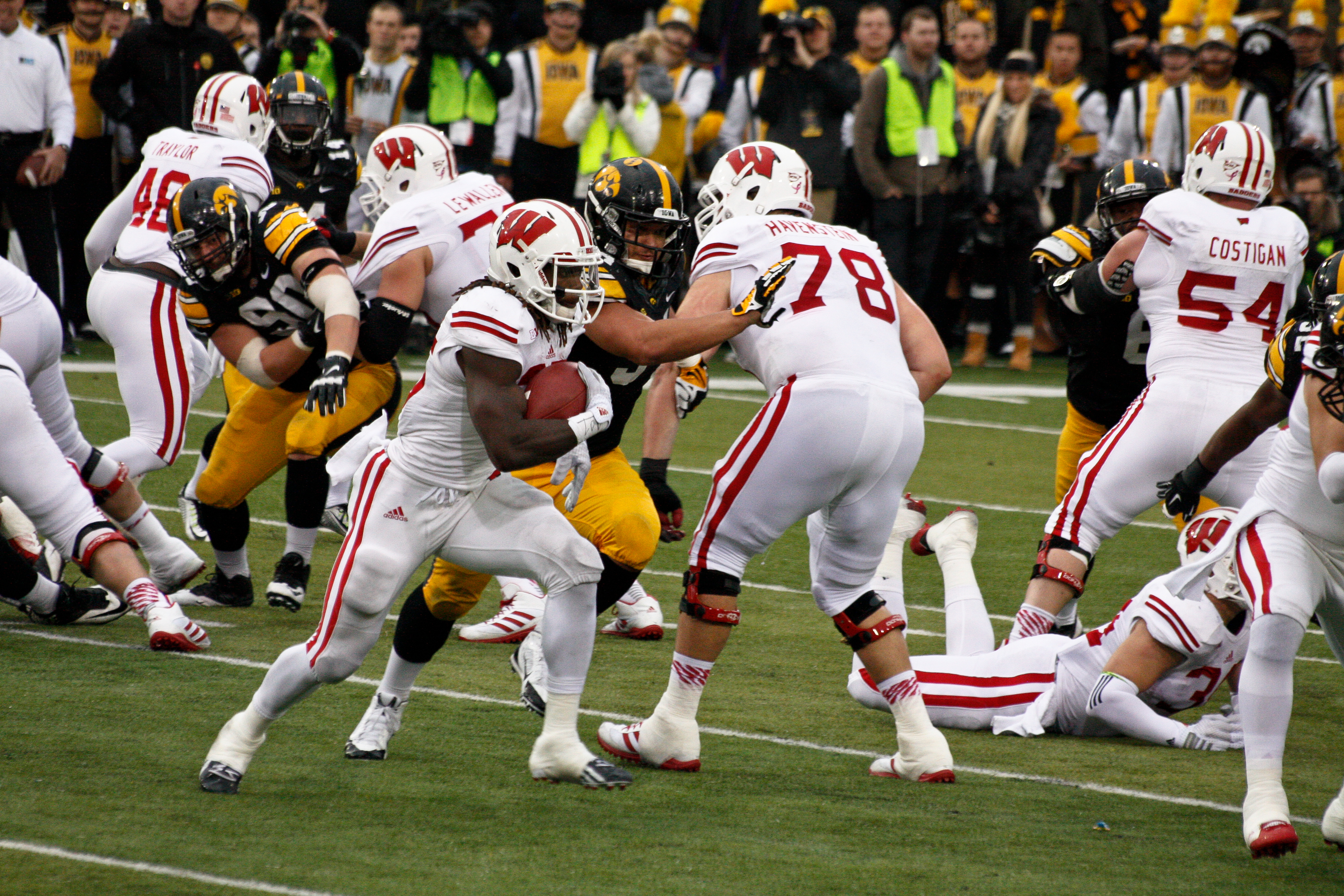
Melvin Gordon running against the Iowa Hawkeyes defense in 2014 at Kinnick Stadium

#14 Wisconsin at Iowa

Team	1	2	3	4	Total
• #14 Badgers	3	13	3	7	26
Hawkeyes	3	0	8	13	24

- Date: November 22
- Location: Kinnick Stadium
  Iowa City, IA
- Game start: 2:30 p.m.
- Elapsed time: 3:15
- Game attendance: 68,610
- Game weather: Temperature: 53 °F (12 °C), Wind: SW 9 mph, Weather: Cloudy
- Referee: Daniel Capron
- TV announcers (ABC/ESPN2): Dave Flemming (Play-by-play), Chris Spielman (Color) & Todd McShay (Sideline)

At the end of the game Melvin Gordon tied the Big Ten and Wisconsin records for most rushing yards in a season (2,109) which was set by Wisconsin running back Ron Dayne in 1996. Also during the game Gordon became the fastest player to reach 2,000 yards rushing in FBS history, on 241 carries. The previous holder for fastest 2,000 yards was Penn State running back Larry Johnson who accomplished the feat on 251 carries in 2002. Gordon received his third Big Ten Offensive Player of the Week in the season.

Statistical Leaders

- Rushing: Melvin Gordon – 30 Carries, 200 Yards (6.5 avg, 88 long), 2 Touchdowns
- Passing: Joel Stave – 7 Completions/14 Attempts for 139 Yards
- Receiving: Melvin Gordon – 4 Receptions, 64 Yards (34 long)
- Defense: Michael Caputo - 11 Tackles, .5 TFL, 1 Forced fumble, 1 Fumble recovery, 1 Pass breakup

=== #22 Minnesota ===
#22 Golden Gophers at #14 Badgers

Team	1	2	3	4	Total
#22 Golden Gophers	14	3	0	7	24
• #14 Badgers	3	10	7	14	34

- Date: November 29
- Location: Camp Randall Stadium
  Madison, WI
- Game start: 2:30 p.m. CST
- Elapsed time: 3:28
- Game attendance: 80,341
- Game weather: Temperature: 43 °F (6 °C), Wind: S 13 mph, Weather: Scattered Clouds
- Referee: David Witvoet
- TV announcers (BTN): Kevin Kugler (Play-by-play), Glen Mason (Color) & Lisa Byington (Sideline)

The Battle for Paul Bunyan's Axe would decide the Big Ten's Western division representative to the 2014 Big Ten Football Championship Game. The last time the rivalry determined a Big Ten Conference champion was in 1962 when #3 Wisconsin defeated #5 Minnesota for a berth to the 1963 Rose Bowl.

Wisconsin would trail in this game 17–3 about halfway through the second quarter but 24 unanswered points by the Badgers put Wisconsin up 27–17 early in the fourth quarter. The Gophers would score a few minutes later to pull within three points but Wisconsin would answer on their ensuing drive and pull out a 34–24 come from behind victory. The victory gave Wisconsin the Big Ten West Division title and a spot in the Big Ten Championship Game against Ohio State. On Melvin Gordon's first carry of the game, he broke a tie with Ron Dayne for the Big Ten Conference and team single season rushing record. Gordon finished the game with 151 yards rushing and 2,260 yards on the season. Gordon now ranks fourth in FBS history for single season rushing yards behind only Oklahoma State's Barry Sanders (2,628 in 1988), UCF's Kevin Smith (2,567 in 2007) and USC's Marcus Allen (2,342 in 1981). Gordon needs to rush for a total of 369 yards in the final two games to break Barry Sanders' single season FBS rushing record.

Statistical Leaders

- Rushing: Melvin Gordon – 29 Carries, 151 Yards (5.2 avg, 24 long), 1 Touchdown
- Passing: Joel Stave – 11 Completions/18 Attempts for 215 Yards, 2 Touchdowns
- Receiving: Alex Erickson – 5 Receptions, 160 Yards
- Defense: Michael Caputo - 12 Tackles, 1 Forced fumble, 1 Fumble recovery

=== Big Ten Conference Championship ===
Big Ten Conference Championship

Team	1	2	3	4	Total
#11 Badgers	0	0	0	0	0
• #6 Buckeyes	14	24	7	14	59

- Date: December 6
- Location: Lucas Oil Stadium
  Indianapolis, IN
- Game start: 7:18 p.m. CST
- Elapsed time: 3:36
- Game attendance: 60,229
- Game weather: N/A (Indoor Stadium)
- Referee: Mike Gannon
- TV announcers (FOX): Gus Johnson (Play-by-play), Charles Davis (Color) & Molly McGrath (Sideline)

Wisconsin lost the 2014 Big Ten Championship to Ohio State 59–0 at Lucas Oil Stadium in Indianapolis, Indiana. It was the first time since 1997 that the Badgers were shutout and the worst loss since 1979 when Ohio State defeated the Badgers 59–0.

Statistical Leaders

- Rushing: Melvin Gordon – 26 carries, 76 yards (2.9 average, 13 longest)
- Passing: Joel Stave – 17 completions/43 attempts for 187 yards, 0 TD, 3 INT
- Receiving: Alex Erickson – 7 Receptions, 83 Yards
- Defense: Marcus Trotter – 10 tackles, 1 Tackle for loss

=== Outback Bowl ===
Outback Bowl

Team	1	2	3	4	OT	Total
#19 Tigers	7	7	3	14	0	31
• #17 Badgers	7	0	14	10	3	34

- Date: January 1
- Location: Raymond James Stadium
  Tampa, FL
- Game start: 11:00 a.m.
- Elapsed time: 3:39
- Game attendance: 44,023
- Referee: Mike Defee
- TV announcers (ESPN2/Touchdown Radio): Bob Wischusen (Play-by-play), Matt Millen (Color), & Quint Kessenich (Sideline)/Taylor Zarzour (Play-by-play), Gino Torretta (Color), & K.C. Jones (Sideline)

On December 7, it was announced that #19 Auburn and #18 Wisconsin would meet in the Outback Bowl. Auburn fired defensive coordinator Ellis Johnson prior to the game and it was announced that Charlie Harbison would be the interim defensive coordinator. Wisconsin's coach Gary Andersen left for Oregon State so the Badgers' athletic director Barry Alvarez coached the Badgers for the game. Prior to the game, the all-time series between the two schools was tied 1-1-1 and Wisconsin won the last meeting 28–14 in the 2006 Capital One Bowl.

== Coaching staff ==
Name	Position
Gary Andersen	Head coach
Dave Aranda	Defensive coordinator/linebackers Coach
Andy Ludwig	Offensive coordinator/quarterbacks coach
Chris Beatty	Wide receivers coach
Thomas Brown	Running backs coach
Bill Busch	Safeties coach
Ben Strickland	Cornerbacks coach
Jeff Genyk	Tight ends coach/special teams coordinator
Chad Kauha'aha'a	Defensive line coach
T.J. Woods	Offensive line coach
Luke Swan	Offensive Graduate Assistant

== Roster ==
2014 Wisconsin Badgers football team roster
Players
Coaches
Offense

Pos.	#	Name	Class
QB	2	Joel Stave	Jr
WR	3	Kenzel Doe	Sr
QB	5	Tanner McEvoy	Jr
RB	6	Corey Clement	So
QB	7	D. J. Gillins	Fr
WR	9	Jordan Fredrick	Jr
WR	10	Krenwick Sanders	Fr
WR	11	Jazz Peavy	Fr
QB	12	Thad Armstrong	So
WR	12	Natrell Jamerson	Fr
QB	13	Bart Houston	So
QB	14	Connor Senger	Fr
WR	15	Robert Wheelwright	So
WR	16	Reggie Love	So
WR	17	George Rushing	Fr
WR	18	Lance Baretz	Sr
RB	20	Austin Ramesh	Fr
RB	22	Caleb Kinlaw	Fr
RB	23	Dare Ogunbowale	So
RB	25	Melvin Gordon	Jr
FB	26	Derek Straus	Jr
RB	28	Taiwan Deal	Fr
WR	31	Connor Cummins	Sr
FB	34	Derek Watt	Jr
FB	36	D. J. Spurling	Fr
TE	42	T. J. Watt	Fr
TE	44	Eric Steffes	So
TE	46	Austin Traylor	Jr
TE	48	Troy Fumagalli	Fr
TE	49	Sam Arneson	Sr
OL	52	Jacob Maxwell	Fr
OL	54	Kyle Costigan	Sr
OL	55	Trent Denlinger	So
OL	58	George Panos	Fr
OL	61	Tyler Marz	Jr
OL	62	Walker Williams	So
OL	63	Michael Deiter	Fr
OL	64	Brett Connors	Fr
OL	66	Beau Benzschawel	Fr
OL	68	Jaden Gault	Fr
OL	69	Aidan McNamara	Fr
OL	70	Dan Voltz	So
OL	71	Ray Ball	Jr
OL	72	Ben Hemer	Fr
OL	73	Dallas Lewallen	Sr
OL	74	Hayden Biegel	Fr
OL	75	Micah Kapoi	Fr
OL	76	Logan Schmidt	So
OL	78	Rob Havenstein	Sr
WR	82	Jake Stengel	Jr
TE	84	Austin Maly	Jr
WR	86	Alex Erickson	So
TE	89	Sam Eckert	Fr

Defense

Pos.	#	Name	Class
CB	1	A.J. Jordan	Jr
CB	4	Devin Gaulden	Jr
CB	5	Darius Hillary	Jr
DE	6	Alec James	Fr
S	7	Michael Caputo	Jr
CB	8	Sojourn Shelton	So
CB	11	T. J. Reynard	Jr
S	13	Evan Bondoc	Fr
ILB	16	D'Cota Dixon	Fr
OLB	17	Sherard Cadogan	Sr
OLB	19	Ryan Connelly	Fr
S	19	Leo Musso	So
CB	21	Peniel Jean	Sr
ILB	22	Chasen Andersen	Fr
S	23	Austin Hudson	Fr
S	24	Keelon Brookins	Fr
CB	25	Derrick Tindal	Fr
S	27	Vonte Jackson	So
CB	29	Terrance Floyd	Jr
ILB	30	Derek Landisch	Sr
S	31	Lubern Figaro	Fr
OLB	32	Leon Jacobs	So
DE	34	Chikwe Obasih	Fr
S	36	Joe Ferguson	Fr
OLB	38	Zander Neuville	Fr
OLB	41	Jesse Hayes	Jr
ILB	43	Michael Trotter	Sr
NG	45	Warren Herring (injured)	Sr
ILB	46	Matt Austin	Fr
OLB	47	Vince Biegel	So
ILB	48	Jack Cichy	So
OLB	49	Justin Schweitzer	Fr
OLB	50	Josh Harrison	Sr
OLB	53	T. J. Edwards	Fr
DE	55	Garret Dooley	Fr
ILB	56	Ben Fischer	Fr
ILB	57	Ben Ruechel	Sr
ILB	58	Joe Schobert	Jr
ILB	59	Marcus Trotter	Sr
DE	91	Konrad Zagzebski (injured)	Sr
NG	92	Jeremy Patterson	Fr
DE	93	Jake Keefer	Jr
DE	94	Conor Sheehy	Fr
NG	95	Arthur Goldberg	So
DE	96	Billy Hirschfeld	Fr
DE	99	James Adeyanju	Jr

Special teams

Pos.	#	Name	Class
K	10	Rafael Gaglianone	Fr
K	37	Andrew Endicott	So
P	38	P.J. Rosowski	Fr
LS	39	Brady Kelliher	Fr
LS	56	James McGuire	Sr
LS	60	Connor Udelhoven	So
P	90	Drew Meyer	Jr
K	97	Jack Russell	Jr

Head coach

- Gary Andersen (Utah) (13 games, through December 9, 2014; 2nd year)
  Barry Alvarez (interim) (Outback Bowl)

Coordinators/assistant coaches

- Dave Aranda (Cal Lutheran)
  Defensive coordinator, Linebackers
- Andy Ludwig (Portland State)
  Offensive coordinator, Quarterback
- Chris Beatty (East Tennessee State)
  Wide receivers
- Thomas Brown (Georgia)
  Running backs
- Bill Busch (Nebraska Wesleyan)
  Safeties
- Jeff Genyk (Bowling Green)
  Tight ends, Special Team coordinator
- Chad Kauha'aha'a (Utah)
  Defensive line
- Ben Strickland (Wisconsin)
  Cornerbacks
- T. J. Woods (Azusa Pacific)
  Offensive line
- Luke Swan (Wisconsin)
  Offensive Graduate Assistant
- Jason Thomas (Utah State)
  Director of football operations
- Vince Guinta (Utah)
  On-Campus Player Development, Recruiting coordinator
- Evan Simon (Frostburg State)
  Head strength and conditioning coach

Legend

- (C) Team captain
- (S) Suspended
- (I) Ineligible
- Injured
- Redshirt

Roster
Last update: September 1, 2014

== Big Ten Players of the Week ==
- Week 4 - Offensive POTW - RB Melvin Gordon (shared with Nebraska RB Ameer Abdullah)
- Week 10 - Offensive POTW - RB Corey Clement
- Week 11 - Defensive POTW - LB Vince Biegel
- Week 12 - Offensive POTW - RB Melvin Gordon, Defensive POTW - LB Joe Schobert
- Week 13 - Offensive POTW - RB Melvin Gordon

== Awards ==
- Sam Arneson

Honorable mention All-Big Ten (Media)

- Vince Biegel

Second team All-Big Ten (Media)
Honorable mention All-Big Ten (Coaches)

- Michael Caputo

Second team All-Big Ten (Consensus)

- Kyle Costigan

First team All-Big Ten (Consensus)

- Rafael Gaglianone

Honorable mention All-Big Ten (Coaches)
Honorable mention All-Big Ten (Media)

- Melvin Gordon

Doak Walker Award
Graham-George Offensive Player of the Year
Ameche-Dayne Running Back of the Year
First team All-America Team (Consensus)
First team All-Big Ten (Consensus)

- Rob Havenstein

First team All-Big Ten (Consensus)

- Darius Hillary

Second team All-Big Ten (Coaches)
Honorable mention All-Big Ten (Media)

- Derek Landisch

First team All-Big Ten (Coaches)
Second team All-Big Ten (Media)

- Dallas Lewallen

Honorable mention All-Big Ten (Coaches)
Honorable mention All-Big Ten (Media)

- Tyler Marz

Honorable mention All-Big Ten (Coaches)
Honorable mention All-Big Ten (Media)

- Joe Schobert

Honorable mention All-Big Ten (Coaches)
Honorable mention All-Big Ten (Media)

- Marcus Trotter

Honorable mention All-Big Ten (Coaches)
Honorable mention All-Big Ten (Media)

- Dan Voltz

Second team All-Big Ten (Media)
Honorable mention All-Big Ten (Coaches)

== Team statistics ==
(as of November 30, 2014)

=== Passing ===
Note: G = Games played; COMP = Completions; ATT = Attempts; COMP % = Completion percentage; YDS = Passing yards; TD = Passing touchdowns; INT = Interceptions; EFF = Passing efficiency

Pos.	Player	G	COMP	ATT	COMP %	YDS	TD	INT	EFF
QB	Bart Houston	6	1	3	33.3	6	1	0	160.1
QB	Tanner McEvoy	12	65	112	58.0	709	5	6	115.2
P	Drew Meyer	12	1	1	100.0	17	0	0	242.8
QB	Joel Stave	8	79	136	58.1	1,042	8	4	136.0

=== Rushing ===
Note: G = Games played; ATT = Attempts; YDS = Yards; AVG = Average yard per carry; LG = Longest run; TD = Rushing touchdowns

Pos.	Player	G	ATT	YDS	AVG	LG	TD
RB	Corey Clement	12	127	830	6.5	72	9
WR	Kenzel Doe	12	13	104	8.0	34	0
WR	Alex Erickson	12	2	-3	-3.0	0	0
RB	Melvin Gordon	12	283	2,260	8.0	88	26
QB	Bart Houston	6	2	8	4.0	4	0
WR	Natrell Jamerson	11	1	23	23.0	23	0
WR	Reggie Love	12	1	45	45.0	45	1
QB	Tanner McEvoy	12	64	572	8.9	62	6
RB	Dare Ogunbowale	12	34	193	5.7	21	1
WR	George Rushing	12	4	17	4.2	8	0
FB	D.J. Spurling	1	2	8	4.0	5	0
QB	Joel Stave	8	9	−26	−2.9	12	0

=== Receiving ===
Note: G = Games played; REC = Receptions; YDS = Yards; AVG = Average yard per catch; LG = Longest catch; TD = Receiving touchdowns

Pos.	Player	G	REC	YDS	AVG	LG	TD
TE	Sam Arneson	12	25	331	13.2	37	4
RB	Corey Clement	12	10	96	9.6	28	1
G	Kyle Costigan	12	1	-5	-5.0	0	0
WR	Kenzel Doe	12	13	146	11.2	25	1
WR	Alex Erickson	12	44	651	14.8	70	3
WR	Jordan Fredrick	12	12	117	9.8	17	0
TE	Troy Fumagalli	12	10	145	14.5	28	0
RB	Melvin Gordon	12	17	151	8.9	35	3
WR	Reggie Love	12	2	15	7.5	13	0
RB	Austin Ramesh	5	3	18	6.0	9	1
WR	George Rushing	12	5	62	12.4	24	0
WR	Krenwick Sanders	8	1	10	10.0	10	0
TE	Austin Traylor	12	2	20	10.0	11	0
WR	Robert Wheelwright	10	1	17	17.0	17	1

=== Kick and punt returning ===
Note: G = Games played; PR = Punt returns; PYDS = Punt return yards; PLG = Punt return long; KR = Kick returns; KYDS = Kick return yards; KLG = Kick return long; TD = Total return touchdowns

Pos.	Player	G	PR	PYDS	PLG	KR	KYDS	KLG	Total Return TDs
WR	Kenzel Doe	12	23	253	40	21	485	38	0
CB	A.J. Jordan	12	1	24	24	0	0	0	0
WR	Natrell Jamerson	13	0	0	0	1	21	21	0

=== Kicking ===
Note: G = Games played; FGM = Field goals made; FGA = Field goals attempted; LG = Field goal long; XPT = Extra points made; XPT ATT = XPT attempted; TP = Total points

Pos.	Player	G	FGM	FGA	LG	XPT	XPT ATT	TP
K	Rafael Gaglianone	12	17	20	51	55	57	106

=== Punting ===
Note: G = Games played; P = Punts; YDS = Yards; AVG = Average per punt; LG = Punt long; In20 = Punts inside the 20; TB = Touchbacks

Pos.	Player	G	P	YDS	AVG	LG	In20	TB
QB	Bart Houston	12	7	243	34.7	52	1	0
P	Drew Meyer	12	43	1,612	37.5	57	16	3

=== Defensive ===
Note: G = Games played; Solo = Solo tackles; Ast = Assisted tackles; Total = Total tackles; TFL-Yds = Tackles for loss-yards lost; Sack–Yds = Sack(s)–yards lost; INT = Interceptions; PDef = Passes defended; FF = Forced fumbles; FR = Forced recoveries

Pos.	Player	G	Solo	Ast	Total	TFL-Yds	Sack–Yds	INT	PDef	FF	FR
S	Michael Caputo	12	57	36	93	5.0–15	0.0–0	1	5	2	4
LB	Marcus Trotter	11	43	32	75	10.0–33	3.5–22	1	2	0	1
LB	Derek Landisch	12	41	29	70	14.5–90	8.0–74	1	4	0	0
LB	Joe Schobert	12	38	23	61	9.5–43	3.0–29	0	7	2	1
LB	Vince Biegel	12	37	17	54	15.5–66	7.5–43	0	2	2	2
CB	Peniel Jean	12	23	22	45	2.0–7	1.0–6	2	2	0	1
CB	Darius Hillary	12	15	17	32	3.0–11	0.0–0	0	5	0	0
LB	Leon Jacobs	12	18	8	26	2.0–11	1.5–5	0	0	0	0
CB	Sojourn Shelton	12	19	7	26	1.0–1	0.0–0	0	5	0	0
NG	Arthur Goldberg	12	10	11	21	0.5–5	0.5–5	0	0	0	0
S	Lubern Figaro	11	8	11	19	1.5–2	0.0–0	1	1	1	0
S	Austin Hudson	12	14	5	19	1.0–6	1.0–6	0	0	1	0
DE	Chikwe Obasih	12	6	12	18	2.0–10	1.5–8	0	1	0	0
DE	Konrad Zagezebski	12	11	6	17	2.0–9	1.0–4	0	1	0	0
S	Michael Trotter	12	9	4	13	1.0–2	1.0–2	0	0	0	0
S	Joe Ferguson	12	4	9	13	0.5–0	0.0–0	0	1	0	0
NG	Warren Herring	7	6	6	12	1.0–1	0.0–0	0	1	1	0
S	Leo Musso	10	4	6	10	0.0–0	0.0–0	0	0	0	0
CB	Derrick Tindal	10	9	0	10	1.0–6	1.0–6	0	1	0	0
RB	Dare Ogunbowale	12	6	3	9	0.0–0	0.0–0	0	0	0	0
CB	Devin Gaulden	12	6	2	8	0.0–0	0.0–0	0	2	0	0
DE	Alec James	12	5	3	8	1.5–2	0.0–0	0	1	0	1
DE	James Adeyanju	10	4	4	8	0.0–0	0.0–0	0	0	0	1
CB	A.J. Jordan	12	3	4	7	0.0–0	0.0–0	0	0	0	0
LB	Ben Ruechel	11	7	0	7	1.0–8	1.0–8	0	0	0	0
CB	Terrance Floyd	9	4	0	4	0.0–0	0.0–0	0	0	0	0
DE	Jake Keefer	11	1	3	4	1.0–4	1.0–4	0	0	0	0
WR	Kenzel Doe	12	3	1	4	0.0–0	0.0–0	0	0	0	0
WR	Natrell Jamerson	11	3	1	4	0.0–0	0.0–0	0	0	0	0
K	Andrew Endicott	12	2	2	4	0.0–0	0.0–0	0	0	0	0
LB	D'Cota Dixon	3	0	3	3	0.0–0	0.0–0	0	0	0	0
LB	Jesse Hayes	10	1	2	3	1.5–9	1.5–9	0	0	1	0
TE	Troy Fumagalli	12	2	1	3	0.0–0	0.0–0	0	0	0	0
TE	Sam Arneson	12	3	0	3	0.0–0	0.0–0	0	0	0	0
LB	Sherard Cadogan	4	3	0	3	0.0–0	0.0–0	0	0	0	0
DE	Conor Sheehy	12	1	1	2	1.0–1	0.0–0	0	0	0	0
FB	Derek Watt	6	0	2	2	0.0–0	0.0–0	0	0	0	0
S	Keelon Brookins	7	2	0	2	0.0–0	0.0–0	0	0	0	0
LB	Josh Harrison	1	1	0	1	1.0–3	1.0–3	0	0	0	0
WR	Krenwick Sanders	8	1	0	1	0.0–0	0.0–0	0	0	0	0
LS	James McGuire	12	0	1	1	0.0–0	0.0–0	0	0	0	0
WR	Jordan Fredrick	12	1	0	1	0.0–0	0.0–0	0	0	0	0
WR	Alex Erickson	11	1	0	1	0.0–0	0.0–0	0	0	0	0
RB	Melvin Gordon	11	1	0	1	0.0–0	0.0–0	0	0	0	0

== 2015 NFL draft ==
=== 2015 NFL Draft class ===
2015 NFL draft selections
Round	Pick #	Team	Player	Position
1	15	San Diego Chargers	Melvin Gordon	Runningback
2	57	St. Louis Rams	Rob Havenstein	Offensive lineman

=== Signed undrafted free agents ===
- Kenzel Doe, WR, Pittsburgh Steelers
- Warren Herring, DT, Atlanta Falcons
