= Bill Busch =

American football coach (born 1965)

Biographical details
- Born: April 27, 1965 (age 61); Pender, Nebraska, U.S.
- Education: Nebraska Wesleyan University (1988); Kearney State College (1990)

Playing career
- 1985–1987: Nebraska Wesleyan
- Position: Wide receiver

Coaching career (HC unless noted)
- 1989: Nebraska Wesleyan (GA)
- 1990–1993: Nebraska (GA)
- 1994: Wisconsin (GA)
- 1995: Northern Arizona (DB)
- 1996: Northern Arizona (co-DC/DB)
- 1997–2000: New Mexico State (DB)
- 2001–2003: Utah (DB)
- 2004: Nebraska (ST/OLB)
- 2005–2007: Nebraska (ST/S)
- 2009–2010: Utah State (DC)
- 2011–2012: Utah State (ST/S)
- 2013–2014: Wisconsin (ST/DB)
- 2015: Ohio State (DQC)
- 2016: Rutgers (DB)
- 2017: Rutgers (co-DC/DB)
- 2018–2020: LSU (S)
- 2021: Nebraska (def. analyst)
- 2022: Nebraska (ST)
- 2022: Nebraska (interim DC/ST)

Accomplishments and honors

Championships
- CFP National Champion (2020)

William Busch (born April 27, 1965) is an American college football coach. He was the interim defensive coordinator and special teams coordinator for the University of Nebraska–Lincoln in 2022. He also coached for Nebraska Wesleyan, Wisconsin, Northern Arizona, New Mexico State, Utah, Utah State, Ohio State, Rutgers, and LSU. He played college football for Nebraska Wesleyan as a wide receiver.

== Early life and education ==
Busch was born on April 27, 1965, in Pender, Nebraska. He played college football for Nebraska Wesleyan University as a wide receiver. After graduating from Nebraska Wesleyan in 1988 he attended Kearney State College—now the University of Nebraska at Kearney—where he earned his Master's degree in 1990.

== Coaching career ==
In Busch's first six seasons of coaching he served as a graduate assistant at his alma mater, Nebraska Wesleyan University, for a year in 1989; the University of Nebraska–Lincoln for four years from 1990 to 1993; and for the University of Wisconsin–Madison in 1994.

Following Busch's stint with Wisconsin, he joined Northern Arizona University as the team's defensive backs coach in 1995. In the following year he was promoted to co-defensive coordinator while maintaining his post as defensive backs coach.

In 1997, Busch was hired by New Mexico State University to serve as defensive backs coach under head football coach Tony Samuel. In 2001, after four seasons with the New Mexico State Aggies, he joined the University of Utah in the same position.

In 2004, Busch started his second stint with Nebraska as the team's special teams coordinator and outside linebackers coach before becoming the special teams coordinator and safeties coach in 2005. After not coaching in 2008, Busch was hired by Gary Andersen at Utah State. He spent four seasons there, serving as defensive coordinator for the first two before reverting to safeties coach and special teams coordinator for the latter two.

In 2013, Busch began his second stint with Wisconsin as the team's special teams coordinator and defensive backs coach.

In 2015, Busch was hired by Ohio State University as a defensive quality control coach.

In 2016, Busch was hired by Rutgers University as the defensive backs coach. In 2017, he was promoted to co-defensive coordinator alongside being the defensive backs coach.

In 2018, Busch was hired by Louisiana State University as the safeties coach. In 2019, under head football coach Ed Orgeron, he was a part of the 2019 College Football Playoff National Championship LSU team. He was not retained following the 2020 season.

In 2021, Busch began his third stint with Nebraska as a defensive analyst. In 2022, he was promoted to special teams coordinator. With eight weeks remaining in the 2022 season, he was promoted to interim defensive coordinator. He was not retained following the hiring of Matt Rhule.

== Personal life ==
In 2023, Busch became a co-host for 93.7 "The Ticket" (Early Break with Sip & Jake).
