= 2014 NCAA Division I FBS football season =

American college football season

2014 NCAA Division I FBS season
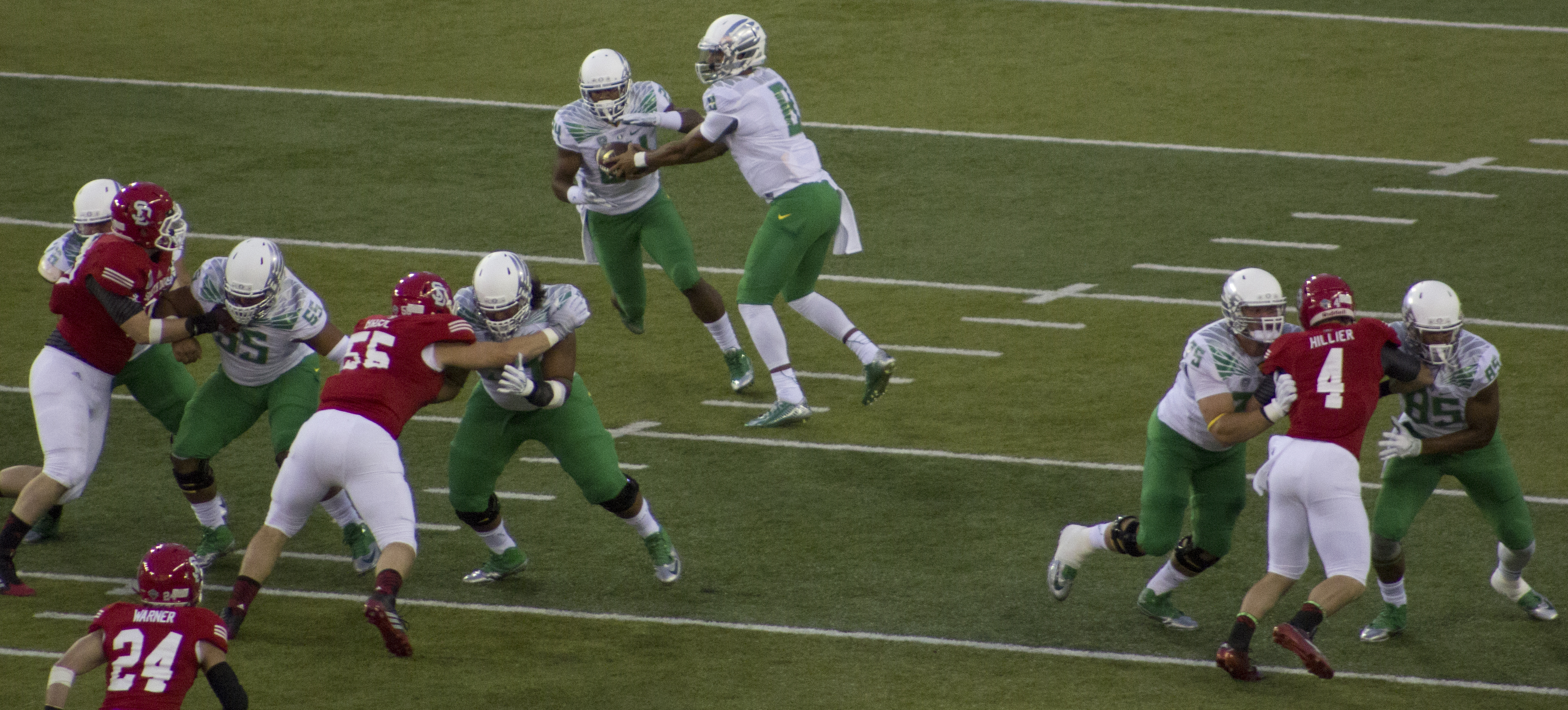
- Oregon on offense in their Week 1 game against the FCS team South Dakota
- Number of teams: 126 full members + 2 transitional
- Duration: August 27 – December 13
- Preseason AP No. 1: Florida State

Postseason
- Duration: December 20, 2014 – January 12, 2015
- Bowl games: 39
- AP Poll No. 1: Ohio State
- Coaches Poll No. 1: Ohio State
- Heisman Trophy: Marcus Mariota (quarterback, Oregon)

College Football Playoff
- 2015 College Football Playoff National Championship
- Site: AT&T Stadium; Arlington, Texas
- Champion(s): Ohio State

NCAA Division I FBS football seasons
- ← 2013 2015 →

The 2014 NCAA Division I FBS football season was the highest level of college football competition in the United States organized by the National Collegiate Athletic Association (NCAA).

The regular season began on August 27, 2014, and ended on December 13, 2014. The postseason concluded on January 12, 2015, with the inaugural College Football Playoff National Championship game at AT&T Stadium in Arlington, Texas.

The 2014 season marked a major change to the postseason with the introduction of the College Football Playoff, a four-team knockout tournament to determine the national champion of Division I FBS. The College Football Playoff system replaced the Bowl Championship Series, which had been in use since 1998.

Ohio State beat Oregon to claim the first ever FBS (formerly Division I-A) national title awarded using a playoff system. Following the game, Ohio State was named the No. 1 team in the AP Poll and Coaches' Poll for the season, making the Buckeyes consensus national champions among the major polls.

== Rule changes ==
The following rule changes have been made by the NCAA Football Rules Committee for the 2014 season:

- Modifying the "targeting" rule enacted for the 2013 season whereby if a targeting ejection is overturned on review, the 15 yard penalty will be overturned as well, unless the foul was committed in conjunction with another foul (such as an above-the-shoulders hit on a quarterback not deemed as targeting, a roughing the passer penalty would still apply).
- Targeting definition expanded from "Initiate contact" to "Make forcible contact" and defining that any forcible contact with the crown of the helmet to an opponent is a targeting foul.
- Allowing all conferences the option to experiment with eight-man officiating crews. The Big 12 Conference experimented with eight-man officiating crews during the 2013 season. The eighth official is referred to as the "Center Judge", positioned opposite the Referee in the offensive backfield, and wears a "C" on the shirt. In 2014, the Atlantic Coast Conference, Big Ten Conference, Big 12 Conference, the Mountain West Conference, and the American Athletic Conference used eight-official crews. The Southeastern Conference experimented with eight officials in selected games in the 2014 season. The Pac-12 Conference made no plans to implement eight-official crews. The eight-man crews were used in bowl games (including the 2015 College Football Playoff National Championship) if one of the conferences (Big 12, Big Ten, ACC, MW, or American) provided a crew for a particular game.
- Modifying the 15-yard roughing the passer penalty to include hits (including lunging and/or rolling) at or below the knees from defenders that are not fouled/blocked into the quarterback, not engaged in tackling the quarterback, or are rushing unabated to the quarterback (similar to the NFL's "Tom Brady" Rule adopted in the 2009 NFL season).
- The chain crew will work the first half on the same side as the press box, then switch to the side opposite the press box for the second half, the procedure used in the NFL. Prior to 2014, the chain crew worked the entire game on the sideline opposite the press box, the procedure used in high school football.

A rule meant to slow down the hurry-up offense by preventing teams from snapping the ball within the first ten seconds of the 40-second play clock to allow for defensive substitutions, or be penalized five yards for delay of game (except within the final 2:00 of each half or when the play clock is set to 25 seconds) was tabled by the Rules Committee and not voted on.

== Conference realignment ==
=== Membership changes ===
Appalachian State, Georgia Southern and Old Dominion moved from the Football Championship Subdivision (FCS) to FBS. 2014 was expected to be the final season for UAB football, who dropped their program at the conclusion of the season due to financial reasons. The UAB football program later restarted in 2017.

School	Former conference	New conference
Appalachian State	Southern Conference (FCS)	Sun Belt
East Carolina	Conference USA	The American
Georgia Southern	Southern Conference (FCS)	Sun Belt
Idaho	FBS independent	Sun Belt
Louisville	The American	ACC
Maryland	ACC	Big Ten
New Mexico State	FBS independent	Sun Belt
Old Dominion	FCS Independent	Conference USA
Rutgers	The American	Big Ten
Tulane	Conference USA	The American
Tulsa	Conference USA	The American
Western Kentucky	Sun Belt	Conference USA

== Other headlines ==
- May 14
  - The NCAA announced its Academic Progress Rate (APR) sanctions for the 2014–15 school year. Two FBS teams, Idaho and UNLV, were among the 36 programs in 11 sports declared ineligible for postseason play due to failure to meet the required APR benchmark.
  - Boise State announced that it had received a waiver from the NCAA allowing the school to immediately provide assistance to incoming freshman recruit Antoine Turner, a defensive end originally from New Orleans who had been homeless due to financial and family issues.
- June 26 – UNLV announced that the school would be eligible for postseason after the upcoming season; they stated that the NCAA had accepted an updated Academic Progress Rate score submitted by the university.
- September 8 – The NCAA restored Penn State's postseason eligibility effective immediately, and full complement of 85 scholarships effective with the 2015 season. This means Penn State could qualify for a bowl game for the 2014 season. Penn State was originally banned from postseason play from 2012 to 2015 because of the Jerry Sandusky child abuse scandal.
- October 4
  - For the first time since Week 11 of the 1990 season, four teams ranked in the top six of the AP Poll lost during the week. Additionally, five of the top eight of the AP Poll lost in the same week for the first time ever. The week's upsets began on Thursday, when No. 2 Oregon lost 31–24 at home to Arizona. Saturday saw No. 3 Alabama lose 23–17 at No. 11 Ole Miss, No. 4 Oklahoma lose 37–33 at No. 25 TCU, No. 6 Texas A&M lose 48–31 at No. 12 Mississippi State, and No. 8 UCLA lose 30–28 at home to Utah.
  - Washington State quarterback Connor Halliday set a new FBS record for single-game passing yards, throwing for 734 yards in a 60–59 loss to Cal. This broke the previous record of 716, set in 1990 by Houston's David Klingler, and was five short of the all-divisions NCAA record of 739 set by Sam Durley of Division III Eureka in 2012. In the same game, Cal's Jared Goff threw for 527 yards, giving the two teams an FBS-record 1,261 passing yards in the game.
- October 12 – The release of the Week 8 AP Poll saw Mississippi State, previously tied for No. 3 with cross-state rival Ole Miss, leapfrog Florida State to reach No. 1 for the first time in school history. Mississippi State had just beaten No. 2 Auburn at home by a score of 38–23, the Bulldogs' third straight over a team then ranked in the top 10. Most significantly, the Bulldogs became the first team in the history of the AP Poll to go from unranked to No. 1 in five weeks, surpassing the previous record of six weeks set by Ohio State in 1954.
- October 18 – Marshall quarterback Rakeem Cato threw for four touchdowns in the Thundering Herd's 45–13 win at FIU, giving him a touchdown pass in 39 consecutive games. This broke a tie for the FBS record with Russell Wilson, who threw for TDs in 38 consecutive games while at NC State and Wisconsin. Cato went on to finish the season and his Marshall career in the Boca Raton Bowl with a streak of 46 games, tying the all-divisions NCAA record of Central Washington's Mike Reilly.
- November 16 – Wisconsin running back Melvin Gordon set a new FBS record with 408 rushing yards in the Badgers' 59–24 win over Nebraska. The previous record of 406 yards had been set by TCU's LaDainian Tomlinson in 1999.
- November 22 – Melvin Gordon's single-game FBS rushing record, which had been set less than a week earlier, is broken by Oklahoma's Samaje Perine, who ran for 427 yards in the Sooners' 44–7 win over Kansas.
- November 29 – Louisville safety Gerod Holliman intercepted his 14th pass of the season, tying the single-season FBS record set in 1968 by Washington's Al Worley. The interception in the final minute sealed the Cardinals' 44–40 win over archrival Kentucky.
- November 30 – Police in Columbus, Ohio discovered the body of Kosta Karageorge, a wrestler at Ohio State who had walked on to the football team but had yet to appear in a game. Karageorge, who disappeared on November 26, was found with an apparently self-inflicted gunshot wound. He had been complaining about post-concussion symptoms in the last weeks of his life.
- December 2 – UAB announced that it would drop football at the end of the season. The Blazers, under first-year head coach Bill Clark, became bowl-eligible for only the second time in program history with a win on November 29 over Southern Miss. UAB became the first FBS-level program to fold since Pacific dropped football after the 1995 season. (The Blazers would ultimately reinstate football in 2017.)
- December 5 – The board of governors of Colorado State approved the construction of a new on-campus stadium to replace the Rams' then-current off-campus home of Hughes Stadium. No date for completion had been set; potential capacities ranged from 35,872 to 41,200. The venue would open in 2017 as Colorado State Stadium with the full 41,200 capacity, and since 2018 has been known as Canvas Stadium.
- December 8 – Sporting News reported that the Big 12 Conference had been planning to expand beyond its current ten teams even before being left out of the inaugural College Football Playoff. Specifically, conference officials met with officials from the University of Cincinnati. These expansion plans were later dropped.

== Updated stadiums ==
=== New stadiums ===
- Baylor opened McLane Stadium, returning home games to its campus for the first time since 1935. The stadium opened with 42,000 permanent seats plus 3,000 standing-room places, and is designed for future expansion to 55,000. The first game was a high school contest on August 29; Baylor's first game was a 45–0 win over SMU on August 31.
- Houston opened TDECU Stadium, a 40,000-seat venue, designed to be easily expandable to 60,000, and built on the site of the school's former Robertson Stadium. The opening game was a 27–7 loss to UTSA on August 29.
- Tulane opened Yulman Stadium, a 30,000-seat on-campus venue located near the former site of Tulane Stadium. This returned home games to the Tulane campus for the first time since 1974, the year before the Superdome opened. The first game was a 38–21 loss to Georgia Tech on September 6.

The three schools that moved from FCS to FBS this season use existing on-campus stadiums:

- Appalachian State plays at Kidd Brewer Stadium, home to the Mountaineers since 1962 and affectionately known to the school's fans as "The Rock". It has an official capacity of 24,050, but has frequently hosted significantly larger crowds, with the record being 31,531.
- Georgia Southern plays at Paulson Stadium, home to the Eagles since 1984. The stadium was expanded to 24,300 for GSU's move to FBS.
- Old Dominion plays at Foreman Field. The 20,118-seat stadium first opened in 1936 for the football program of what was then known as the Norfolk Division of The College of William & Mary. After football was dropped after the 1941 season, the stadium was used for other football games (notably the former Oyster Bowl), plus other ODU sports, until the school reinstated football in 2009.

=== Renovated stadiums ===
- LSU opened a new south end-zone upper deck expansion of Tiger Stadium that added approximately 60 "Tiger Den" suites, 3,000 club seats and 1,500 general public seats and brought the total capacity to approximately 102,321, making it the seventh-largest college football stadium in the country.
- Ohio State added 2,500 seats to the south stands of Ohio Stadium. These seats, built over the entrance tunnels, raised the official capacity of the stadium to 104,851, making it the third-largest stadium in the country and the fifth-largest stadium in the world.
- Texas A&M opened Phase 1 of a major three-year renovation of Kyle Field, which includes re-construction of the east side first deck, and construction of the south end zone, which in turn includes seating, media interview areas, 12th Man Productions and related gameday support, a commissary and recruiting area.
- Mississippi State opened a new north end-zone expansion of Davis Wade Stadium which took stadium capacity from 55,000 to over 61,000. The renovation created new concessions and restrooms, plus a new west side concourse.
- Missouri opened a new east side expansion of Faurot Field. An upper bowl was completed for the east side of the stadium, providing 5,200 general admission seats and 800 club seats.
- Louisiana-Lafayette enclosed the south side of Cajun Field. The stadium upgrade added 5,900 seats increasing the capacity from 31,000 to 36,900.
- Purdue removed the majority of their south end-zone bleachers at Ross–Ade Stadium and replaced it with a patio area. This stadium upgrade lowered the stadium capacity from 62,500 to 57,236.
- The Rose Bowl opened the final phase of its multi-year renovation project, which included the removal of seats on the east and west sidelines to restore the original oval shape of the seating bowl. Also included in the project were additional new restrooms, new entry gate structures, and additional new concession stands. The historic hedges surrounding the field were restored to create a new "Rose Garden Walkway". An iconic plaza opened outside of Gate A in front of the south main entrance to the stadium, featuring a large logo of the Pasadena Tournament of Roses.

=== Other ===
- Eastern Michigan installed a gray FieldTurf playing surface at Rynearson Stadium. The stadium is only the second FBS venue with a non-traditional field color, after Albertsons Stadium at Boise State, and the sixth college stadium overall with this feature.

== Regular season top 10 matchups ==
Rankings reflect the AP Poll. Rankings for Week 9 and beyond will list College Football Playoff Rankings first and AP Poll second. Teams that fail to be a top 10 team for one poll or the other will be noted.

- Week 2
  - No. 3 Oregon defeated No. 7 Michigan State 46–27 (Autzen Stadium, Eugene, Oregon)
- Week 7
  - No. 5 Baylor defeated No. 9 TCU 61–58 (McLane Stadium, Waco, Texas)
  - No. 3 Mississippi State defeated No. 2 Auburn 38–23 (Davis Wade Stadium, Starkville, Mississippi)
- Week 8
  - No. 2 Florida State defeated No. 5 Notre Dame 31–27 (Doak Campbell Stadium, Tallahassee, Florida)
- Week 10
  - No. 3/4 Auburn defeated No. 4/7 Ole Miss 35–31 (Vaught-Hemingway Stadium, Oxford, Mississippi)
- Week 11
  - No. 9/11 Arizona State defeated No. 10/8 Notre Dame 55–31 (Sun Devil Stadium, Tempe, Arizona)
  - No. 6/6 TCU defeated No. 7/9 Kansas State 41–20 (Amon G. Carter Stadium, Fort Worth, Texas)
- Week 12
  - No. 5/4 Alabama defeated No. 1/1 Mississippi State 25–20 (Bryant Denny Stadium Tuscaloosa, Alabama)
- Week 15
  - No. 2/3 Oregon defeated No. 7/8 Arizona 51–13 (Pac-12 Championship Game, Levi's Stadium, Santa Clara, California)
  - No. 6/5 Baylor defeated No. 9/9 Kansas State 38–27 (McLane Stadium, Waco, Texas)

== Conference standings ==
2014 American Athletic Conference football standings
	Conf.			Overall
Team	W		L	W		L
No. 25 Memphis +	7	–	1	10	–	3
Cincinnati +	7	–	1	9	–	4
UCF +	7	–	1	9	–	4
East Carolina	5	–	3	8	–	5
Houston	5	–	3	8	–	5
Temple	4	–	4	6	–	6
South Florida	3	–	5	4	–	8
Tulane	2	–	6	3	–	9
Tulsa	2	–	6	2	–	10
UConn	1	–	7	2	–	10
SMU	1	–	7	1	–	11
+ – Conference co-champions; Rankings from AP Poll

2014 Atlantic Coast Conference football standings
	Conf.			Overall
Team	W		L	W		L
Atlantic Division
No. T–5 Florida State x$^	8	–	0	13	–	1
No. 15 Clemson	6	–	2	10	–	3
No. 24 Louisville	5	–	3	9	–	4
Boston College	4	–	4	7	–	6
NC State	3	–	5	8	–	5
Syracuse	1	–	7	3	–	9
Wake Forest	1	–	7	3	–	9
Coastal Division
No. 8 Georgia Tech x	6	–	2	11	–	3
Duke	5	–	3	9	–	4
North Carolina	4	–	4	6	–	7
Pittsburgh	4	–	4	6	–	7
Miami (FL)	3	–	5	6	–	7
Virginia Tech	3	–	5	7	–	6
Virginia	3	–	5	5	–	7
Championship: Florida State 37, Georgia Tech 35
^ – College Football Playoff participant; $ – Conference champion; x – Division champion/co-champions; Rankings from AP Poll

2014 Big Ten Conference football standings
	Conf.			Overall
Team	W		L	W		L
East Division
No. 1 Ohio State x$#^	8	–	0	14	–	1
No. T–5 Michigan State	7	–	1	11	–	2
Maryland	4	–	4	7	–	6
Rutgers	3	–	5	8	–	5
Michigan	3	–	5	5	–	7
Penn State	2	–	6	7	–	6
Indiana	1	–	7	4	–	8
West Division
No. 13 Wisconsin x	7	–	1	11	–	3
Minnesota	5	–	3	8	–	5
Nebraska	5	–	3	9	–	4
Iowa	4	–	4	7	–	6
Illinois	3	–	5	6	–	7
Northwestern	3	–	5	5	–	7
Purdue	1	–	7	3	–	9
Championship: Ohio State 59, Wisconsin 0
# – College Football Playoff champion; ^ – College Football Playoff participant; $ – Conference champion; x – Division champion/co-champions; Rankings from AP Poll

2014 Big 12 Conference football standings
	Conf.			Overall
Team	W		L	W		L
No. 7 Baylor +	8	–	1	11	–	2
No. 3 TCU +	8	–	1	12	–	1
No. 18 Kansas State	7	–	2	9	–	4
Oklahoma	5	–	4	8	–	5
West Virginia	5	–	4	7	–	6
Texas	5	–	4	6	–	7
Oklahoma State	4	–	5	7	–	6
Texas Tech	2	–	7	4	–	8
Kansas	1	–	8	3	–	9
Iowa State	0	–	9	2	–	10
+ – Conference co-champions; Rankings from AP Poll

2014 Conference USA football standings
	Conf.			Overall
Team	W		L	W		L
East Division
No. 23 Marshall x$	7	–	1	13	–	1
Middle Tennessee	5	–	3	6	–	6
Western Kentucky	4	–	4	8	–	5
UAB	4	–	4	6	–	6
Old Dominion*	4	–	4	6	–	6
FIU	3	–	5	4	–	8
Florida Atlantic	2	–	6	3	–	9
West Division
Louisiana Tech x	7	–	1	9	–	5
Rice	5	–	3	8	–	5
UTEP	5	–	3	7	–	6
UTSA	3	–	5	4	–	8
North Texas	2	–	6	4	–	8
Southern Miss	1	–	7	3	–	9
Championship: Marshall 26, Louisiana Tech 23
$ – Conference champion; x – Division champion/co-champions; * Ineligible for postseason bowl due to transition from FCS; Rankings from AP Poll

2014 Mid-American Conference football standings
	Conf.			Overall
Team	W		L	W		L
East Division
Bowling Green x	5	–	3	8	–	6
Ohio	4	–	4	6	–	6
Buffalo	3	–	4	5	–	6
Akron	3	–	5	5	–	7
UMass	3	–	5	3	–	9
Miami (OH)	2	–	6	2	–	10
Kent State	1	–	6	2	–	9
West Division
Northern Illinois xy$	7	–	1	11	–	3
Toledo x	7	–	1	9	–	4
Western Michigan	6	–	2	8	–	5
Central Michigan	5	–	3	7	–	6
Ball State	4	–	4	5	–	7
Eastern Michigan	1	–	7	2	–	10
Championship: Northern Illinois 51, Bowling Green 17
$ – Conference champion; x – Division champion/co-champions; y – Championship game participant

2014 Mountain West Conference football standings
	Conf.			Overall
Team	W		L	W		L
Mountain Division
No. 16 Boise State x$	7	–	1	12	–	2
Colorado State	6	–	2	10	–	3
Utah State	6	–	2	10	–	4
Air Force	5	–	3	10	–	3
New Mexico	2	–	6	4	–	8
Wyoming	2	–	6	4	–	8
West Division
Fresno State x	5	–	3	6	–	8
San Diego State	5	–	3	7	–	6
Nevada	4	–	4	7	–	6
Hawaii	3	–	5	4	–	9
San Jose State	2	–	6	3	–	9
UNLV	1	–	7	2	–	11
Championship: Boise State 28, Fresno State 14
$ – Conference champion; x – Division champion/co-champions; Rankings from AP Poll

2014 Pac-12 Conference football standings
	Conf.			Overall
Team	W		L	W		L
North Division
No. 2 Oregon xy$^	8	–	1	13	–	2
Stanford	5	–	4	8	–	5
Washington	4	–	5	8	–	6
California	3	–	6	5	–	7
Oregon State	2	–	7	5	–	7
Washington State	2	–	7	3	–	9
South Division
No. 19 Arizona xy	7	–	2	10	–	4
No. 10 UCLA	6	–	3	10	–	3
No. 12 Arizona State	6	–	3	10	–	3
No. 20 USC	6	–	3	9	–	4
No. 21 Utah	5	–	4	9	–	4
Colorado	0	–	9	2	–	10
Championship: Oregon 51, Arizona 13
^ – College Football Playoff participant; $ – Conference champion; x – Division champion/co-champions; y – Championship game participant; Rankings from AP Poll

2014 Southeastern Conference football standings
	Conf.			Overall
Team	W		L	W		L
Eastern Division
No. 14 Missouri x	7	–	1	11	–	3
No. 9 Georgia	6	–	2	10	–	3
Florida	4	–	4	7	–	5
Tennessee	3	–	5	7	–	6
South Carolina	3	–	5	7	–	6
Kentucky	2	–	6	5	–	7
Vanderbilt	0	–	8	3	–	9
Western Division
No. 4 Alabama x$^	7	–	1	12	–	2
No. 11 Mississippi State	6	–	2	10	–	3
No. 17 Ole Miss *	5	–	3	9	–	4
No. 22 Auburn	4	–	4	8	–	5
LSU *	4	–	4	8	–	5
Texas A&M	3	–	5	8	–	5
Arkansas	2	–	6	7	–	6
Championship: Alabama 42, Missouri 13
^ – College Football Playoff participant; $ – Conference champion; x – Division champion/co-champions; * LSU and Ole Miss vacated all wins (except for Ole Miss' win over Presbyterian) due to NCAA violations.; Rankings from AP Poll

2014 Sun Belt Conference football standings
	Conf.			Overall
Team	W		L	W		L
Georgia Southern * $	8	–	0	9	–	3
Louisiana–Lafayette ***	5	–	1	7	–	4
Appalachian State *	6	–	2	7	–	5
Texas State	5	–	3	7	–	5
Arkansas State	5	–	3	7	–	6
South Alabama	5	–	3	6	–	7
Louisiana–Monroe	3	–	5	4	–	8
Troy	3	–	5	3	–	9
New Mexico State	1	–	7	2	–	10
Idaho **	1	–	7	1	–	10
Georgia State	0	–	8	1	–	11
$ – Conference champion; * – Appalachian State and Georgia Southern ineligible for postseason play due to FCS-to-FBS transition rules ** – Idaho ineligible for postseason play due to APR penalties *** – Louisiana–Lafayette vacated 2 wins due to NCAA violations

2014 NCAA Division I FBS independents football records
	Conf.			Overall
Team	W		L	W		L
BYU		–		8	–	5
Notre Dame		–		8	–	5
Navy		–		8	–	5
Army		–		4	–	8
Rankings from AP Poll

== Conference summaries ==
Rankings reflect the Week 15 AP Poll before the conference championship games were played.

=== Power 5 Conferences ===
Conference	Champion	Runner-up	Score	Offensive Player of the Year	Defensive Player of the Year	Coach of the Year
ACC	No. 2 Florida State ^{CFP}	No. 12 Georgia Tech	37–35	James Conner, RB, Pittsburgh (Player of the Year)	Vic Beasley, DE, Clemson	Paul Johnson, Georgia Tech
Big 12	No. 5 Baylor No. 4 TCU	N/A	N/A	Trevone Boykin, TCU	Paul Dawson, TCU	Gary Patterson, TCU
Big Ten	No. 6 Ohio State ^{CFP}	No. 11 Wisconsin	59–0	Melvin Gordon, RB, Wisconsin	Joey Bosa, DE, Ohio State	Jerry Kill, Minnesota (coaches and media)
Pac-12	No. 3 Oregon ^{CFP}	No. 8 Arizona	51–13	Marcus Mariota, QB, Oregon	Scooby Wright, LB, Arizona	Rich Rodriguez, Arizona
SEC	No. 1 Alabama ^{CFP}	No. 14 Missouri	42–13	Amari Cooper, WR, Alabama (AP, Coaches)	Shane Ray, DE, Missouri (AP, Coaches)	Dan Mullen, Mississippi State (AP); Gary Pinkel, Missouri (Coaches)

=== Group of Five Conferences ===
Note: Records are regular-season only, and do not include playoff games.

Conference	Champion	Runner up	Score	Record	Offensive Player of the Year	Defensive Player of the Year	Coach of the Year
AAC	Memphis; UCF; Cincinnati	N/A	N/A	Memphis 9-3; Cincinnati 9-3; UCF 9-3	Shane Carden, QB, East Carolina	Jacoby Glenn, CB, UCF & Tank Jakes, LB, Memphis	Justin Fuente, Memphis
C-USA	Marshall	Louisiana Tech	26–23	Marshall 12-1	Brandon Doughty, QB, Western Kentucky (MVP); Rakeem Cato, QB, Marshall (Offensive POY)	Neville Hewitt, LB, Marshall	Doc Holliday, Marshall
MAC	Northern Illinois	Bowling Green	51–17	Northern Illinois 11-2	Jarvion Franklin, RB, Western Michigan	Quinten Rollins, DB, Miami (OH)	P. J. Fleck, Western Michigan
MW	No. 22 Boise State	Fresno State	28–14	Boise State 11-2	Garrett Grayson, QB, Colorado State	Zach Vigil, LB, Utah State	Jim McElwain, Colorado State
Sun Belt	Georgia Southern	N/A	N/A	Georgia Southern 8-3*	Elijah McGuire, RB, Louisiana–Lafayette	David Mayo, LB, Texas State	Willie Fritz, Georgia Southern

^{CFP} College Football Playoff participant

* On July 22, 2016, Georgia Southern announced that it had been ordered by the NCAA to vacate two wins from the 2013 season and one win from the 2014 season as punishment for fielding academically ineligible student athletes during those games. The ruling does not affect Georgia Southern's 2014 Sun Belt Conference Football Championship.

== FCS team wins over FBS teams ==
Italics denotes FCS teams.

Date	Visiting team	Home team	Site	Result	Attendance	Ref.
August 30	No. 22 (FCS) Bethune–Cookman	FIU	FIU Stadium • Miami, Florida	14–12	14,053	
August 30	No. 2 (FCS) North Dakota State	Iowa State	Jack Trice Stadium • Ames, Iowa	34–14	54,800	
September 6	Eastern Kentucky	Miami (OH)	Yager Stadium • Oxford, Ohio	17–10	16,670	
September 13	Abilene Christian	Troy	Veterans Memorial Stadium • Troy, Alabama	38–35	17,320	
September 13	Indiana State	Ball State	Scheumann Stadium • Muncie, Indiana (Blue Key Victory Bell)	27–20	15,860	
September 20	Northwestern State	Louisiana Tech	Joe Aillet Stadium • Ruston, Louisiana (rivalry)	30–27	26,004	
September 27	Army	Yale	Yale Bowl • New Haven, Connecticut	43–49 ^{OT}	34,142	
October 11	Liberty	Appalachian State	Kidd Brewer Stadium • Boone, North Carolina	55–48 ^{OT}	26,058	
^{#}Rankings from AP Poll released prior to game.

== Postseason ==
=== Bowl selections ===
Starting with the 2014–15 postseason, six College Football Playoff (CFP) bowl games host two semifinal playoff games on a rotating basis. For the 2014-15 season, the Rose Bowl and the Sugar Bowl hosted the semifinal games, with the winners advancing to the 2015 College Football Playoff National Championship at AT&T Stadium in Arlington, Texas.

==== Bowl-eligible teams ====
- American (6): Cincinnati, East Carolina, Houston, Memphis, Temple, UCF
- ACC (11): Boston College, Clemson, Duke, Florida State, Georgia Tech, Louisville, Miami (FL), NC State, North Carolina, Pittsburgh, Virginia Tech
- Big 12 (7): Baylor, Kansas State, Oklahoma, Oklahoma State, TCU, Texas, West Virginia
- Big Ten (10): Illinois, Iowa, Maryland, Michigan State, Minnesota, Nebraska, Ohio State, Penn State, Rutgers, Wisconsin
- Conference USA (7): Louisiana Tech, Marshall, Middle Tennessee State, Rice, UAB, UTEP, Western Kentucky
- Independents (3): BYU, Navy, Notre Dame
- MAC (6): Bowling Green, Central Michigan, Northern Illinois, Ohio, Toledo, Western Michigan
- Mountain West (7): Air Force, Boise State, Colorado State, Fresno State, Nevada, San Diego State, Utah State
- Pac-12 (8): Arizona, Arizona State, Oregon, Stanford, UCLA, USC, Utah, Washington
- SEC (12): Alabama, Arkansas, Auburn, Florida, Georgia, LSU, Mississippi State, Missouri, Ole Miss, South Carolina, Tennessee, Texas A&M
- Sun Belt (4): Arkansas State, Louisiana–Lafayette, South Alabama, Texas State

Number of bowl berths available: 76
Number of bowl-eligible teams: 81

==== Bowl-eligible teams that were not invited ====
Ohio, Texas State, Temple, UAB, Middle Tennessee

==== Bowl-ineligible teams ====
- American (5): Connecticut, SMU, Tulane, Tulsa, USF
- ACC (3): Syracuse, Virginia, Wake Forest
- Big Ten (4): Indiana, Michigan, Northwestern, Purdue
- Big 12 (3): Iowa State, Kansas, Texas Tech
- Conference USA (6): FIU, Florida Atlantic, North Texas, Old Dominion†, Southern Miss, UTSA
- Independents (1): Army
- MAC (7): Akron, Ball State, Buffalo, Eastern Michigan, Kent State, Massachusetts, Miami (OH)
- Mountain West (5): Hawai'i, New Mexico, San Jose State, UNLV, Wyoming
- Pac 12 (4): California, Colorado, Oregon State, Washington State
- SEC (2): Kentucky, Vanderbilt
- Sun Belt (7): Appalachian State†, Georgia Southern†, Georgia State, Idaho‡, Louisiana–Monroe, New Mexico State, Troy

Number of bowl-ineligible teams: 47

† – Appalachian State (7–5), Georgia Southern (9–3, Sun Belt champions), and Old Dominion (6–6) were conditionally eligible based on win–loss record. However, under FCS-to-FBS transition rules, they were not eligible due to enough teams qualifying under normal circumstances.

‡ – Idaho was ineligible for postseason play due to an insufficient Academic Progress Rate. However, the Vandals would not have been eligible without the ban, as they finished with a 1-10 record.

=== College Football Playoff ===
Semifinals
January 1 – Sugar Bowl; Mercedes-Benz Superdome, New Orleans
1	Alabama	35
4	Ohio State	42
January 1 – Rose Bowl; Rose Bowl Stadium, Pasadena
2	Oregon	59
3	Florida State	20

Championship
January 12 – National Championship; AT&T Stadium, Arlington
4	Ohio State	42
2	Oregon	20

=== Conference performance in bowl games ===
Conference	Total games	Wins	Losses	Pct.
SEC	12	7	5	.583
ACC	11	4	7	.364
Big Ten	11	6	5	.545
Pac-12	9	6	3	.667
Big 12	7	2	5	.286
MW	7	3	4	.429
American	5	2	3	.400
C-USA	5	4	1	.800
MAC	5	2	3	.400
Independents	3	2	1	.667
Sun Belt	3	1	2	.333

== Rankings ==
=== Final CFP rankings ===
CFP	School	Record	Bowl Game
1	Alabama	12–1	Sugar Bowl
2	Oregon	12–1	Rose Bowl
3	Florida State	13–0	Rose Bowl
4	Ohio State	12–1	Sugar Bowl
5	Baylor	11–1	Cotton Bowl
6	TCU	11–1	Peach Bowl
7	Mississippi State	10–2	Orange Bowl
8	Michigan State	10–2	Cotton Bowl
9	Ole Miss	9–3	Peach Bowl
10	Arizona	10–3	Fiesta Bowl
11	Kansas State	9–3	Alamo Bowl
12	Georgia Tech	10–3	Orange Bowl
13	Georgia	9–3	Belk Bowl
14	UCLA	9–3	Alamo Bowl
15	Arizona State	9–3	Sun Bowl
16	Missouri	10–3	Citrus Bowl
17	Clemson	9–3	Russell Athletic Bowl
18	Wisconsin	10–3	Outback Bowl
19	Auburn	8–4	Outback Bowl
20	Boise State	11–2	Fiesta Bowl
21	Louisville	9–3	Belk Bowl
22	Utah	8–4	Las Vegas Bowl
23	LSU	8–4	Music City Bowl
24	USC	8–4	Holiday Bowl
25	Minnesota	8–4	Citrus Bowl

=== Final rankings ===
Rank	Associated Press	Coaches' Poll
1	Ohio State	Ohio State
2	Oregon	Oregon
3	TCU	TCU
4	Alabama	Alabama
5	Florida State	Michigan State
6	Michigan State	Florida State
7	Baylor	Georgia Tech
8	Georgia Tech	Baylor
9	Georgia	Georgia
10	UCLA	UCLA
11	Mississippi State	Missouri
12	Arizona State	Mississippi State
13	Wisconsin	Wisconsin
14	Missouri	Arizona State
15	Clemson	Clemson
16	Boise State	Boise State
17	Ole Miss	Arizona
18	Kansas State	Kansas State
19	Arizona	Ole Miss
20	USC	Utah
21	Utah	USC
22	Auburn	Marshall
23	Marshall	Auburn
24	Louisville	Louisville
25	Memphis	Memphis

Unlike the BCS, the Coaches' Poll is not contractually obligated to name the CFP champion as its No. 1 team.

== Awards and honors ==
=== Heisman Trophy ===
The Heisman Trophy is given to the year's most outstanding player.

Player	School	Position	1st	2nd	3rd	Total
Marcus Mariota	Oregon	QB	788	74	22	2,534
Melvin Gordon	Wisconsin	RB	37	432	275	1,250
Amari Cooper	Alabama	WR	49	280	316	1,023
Trevone Boykin	TCU	QB	8	45	104	218
J. T. Barrett	Ohio State	QB	0	19	40	78
Jameis Winston	Florida State	QB	4	10	19	51
Tevin Coleman	Indiana	RB	2	8	22	44
Dak Prescott	Mississippi State	QB	2	4	28	42
Scooby Wright	Arizona	LB	0	4	13	21
Bryce Petty	Baylor	QB	1	3	4	13

=== Other overall ===
- Archie Griffin Award (MVP): Ezekiel Elliott, Ohio State
- AP Player of the Year: Marcus Mariota, Oregon
- Chic Harley Award (Player of the Year): Marcus Mariota, Oregon
- Maxwell Award (top player): Marcus Mariota, Oregon
- SN Player of the Year: Marcus Mariota, Oregon
- Walter Camp Award (top player): Marcus Mariota, Oregon

=== Special overall ===
- Burlsworth Trophy (top player who began as walk-on): Justin Hardy, East Carolina
- Paul Hornung Award (most versatile player): Shaq Thompson, Washington
- Campbell Trophy ("academic Heisman"): David Helton, Duke
- Wuerffel Trophy (humanitarian-athlete): Deterrian Shackelford, Ole Miss

=== Offense ===
Quarterback

- Davey O'Brien Award (quarterback): Marcus Mariota, Oregon
- Johnny Unitas Award (senior/4th year quarterback): Marcus Mariota, Oregon
- Kellen Moore Award (quarterback): Trevone Boykin, TCU
- Manning Award (quarterback): Marcus Mariota, Oregon
- Sammy Baugh Trophy (passing quarterback): Brandon Doughty, Western Kentucky

Running back

- Doak Walker Award (running back): Melvin Gordon, Wisconsin
- Jim Brown Trophy (running back): Melvin Gordon, Wisconsin

Wide receiver

- Fred Biletnikoff Award (wide receiver): Amari Cooper, Alabama
- Paul Warfield Trophy (wide receiver): Amari Cooper, Alabama

Tight end

- John Mackey Award (tight end): Nick O'Leary, Florida State
- Ozzie Newsome Award (tight end): Nick O'Leary, Florida State

Lineman

- Dave Rimington Trophy (center): Reese Dismukes, Auburn
- Outland Trophy (interior lineman): Brandon Scherff, Iowa
- Jim Parker Trophy (offensive lineman): Reese Dismukes, Auburn

=== Defense ===
- Bronko Nagurski Trophy (defensive player): Scooby Wright, Arizona
- Chuck Bednarik Award (defensive player): Scooby Wright, Arizona
- Lott Trophy (defensive impact): Eric Kendricks, UCLA

Defensive line

- Bill Willis Award (defensive lineman): Joey Bosa, Ohio State
- Dick Butkus Award (linebacker): Eric Kendricks, UCLA
- Jack Lambert Trophy (linebacker): Scooby Wright, Arizona
- Lombardi Award (defensive lineman/linebacker): Scooby Wright, Arizona
- Ted Hendricks Award (defensive end): Nate Orchard, Utah

Defensive back

- Jim Thorpe Award (defensive back): Gerod Holliman, Louisville
- Jack Tatum Trophy (defensive back): Gerod Holliman, Louisville

=== Special teams ===
- Lou Groza Award (placekicker): Brad Craddock, Maryland
- Vlade Award (placekicker): Roberto Aguayo, FSU
- Ray Guy Award (punter): Tom Hackett, Utah
- Jet Award (return specialist): Tyler Lockett, Kansas State

=== Coaches ===
- AFCA Coach of the Year: Gary Patterson, TCU
- AP Coach of the Year: Gary Patterson, TCU
- Bobby Bowden National Collegiate Coach of the Year Award: Gary Patterson, TCU
- Bobby Dodd Coach of the Year Award: Nick Saban, Alabama
- Eddie Robinson Coach of the Year: Gary Patterson, TCU
- Maxwell Coach of the Year: Dan Mullen, Mississippi State
- Paul "Bear" Bryant Award: Gary Patterson, TCU
- Liberty Mutual Coach of the Year Award:
- SN Coach of the Year: Gary Patterson, TCU
- The Home Depot Coach of the Year Award: Gary Patterson, TCU
- Woody Hayes Trophy: Gary Patterson, TCU
- Walter Camp Coach of the Year: Gary Patterson, TCU

==== Assistants ====
- AFCA Assistant Coach of the Year: Gary Campbell, Oregon
- Broyles Award: Tom Herman, Ohio State

== Coaching changes ==
This is restricted to coaching changes taking place on or after May 1, 2014. For coaching changes that occurred earlier in 2014, see 2013 NCAA Division I FBS end-of-season coaching changes.

Team	Outgoing coach	Date	Reason	Replacement
Buffalo	Jeff Quinn	October 12, 2014	Fired	Alex Wood (interim)
Buffalo	Alex Wood (interim)	November 30, 2014	Replaced	Lance Leipold (permanent)
Central Michigan	Dan Enos	January 22, 2015	Hired as offensive coordinator by Arkansas	John Bonamego
Colorado State	Jim McElwain	December 4, 2014	Hired by Florida	Dave Baldwin (interim)
Colorado State	Dave Baldwin (interim)	December 22, 2014	Replaced	Mike Bobo (permanent)
Florida	Will Muschamp	November 16, 2014	Resigned	D. J. Durkin (interim – bowl game)
Florida	D. J. Durkin (interim)	December 4, 2014	Replaced	Jim McElwain (permanent)
Houston	Tony Levine	December 8, 2014	Fired	David Gibbs (interim)
Houston	David Gibbs (interim)	December 16, 2014	Replaced	Tom Herman (permanent)
Kansas	Charlie Weis	September 28, 2014	Fired	Clint Bowen (Interim)
Kansas	Clint Bowen (interim)	December 5, 2014	Replaced	David Beaty (permanent)
Michigan	Brady Hoke	December 2, 2014	Fired	Jim Harbaugh
Nebraska	Bo Pelini	November 30, 2014	Fired	Barney Cotton (interim)
Nebraska	Barney Cotton (interim)	December 4, 2014	Replaced	Mike Riley (permanent)
Pittsburgh	Paul Chryst	December 17, 2014	Hired by Wisconsin	Joe Rudolph (interim)
Pittsburgh	Joe Rudolph (interim)	December 23, 2014	Replaced	Pat Narduzzi (permanent)
Oregon State	Mike Riley	December 4, 2014	Hired by Nebraska	Gary Andersen
SMU	June Jones	September 8, 2014	Resigned	Tom Mason (interim)
SMU	Tom Mason (interim)	November 30, 2014	Replaced	Chad Morris (permanent)
Troy	Larry Blakeney	October 5, 2014	Retired	Neal Brown
Tulsa	Bill Blankenship	December 1, 2014	Fired	Philip Montgomery
UAB	Bill Clark	December 2, 2014	School dropped football	None (Note: UAB would later announce that it would reinstate football in the 2017 season; Clark was retained as head coach.)
UNLV	Bobby Hauck	November 28, 2014	Resigned	Tony Sanchez
Wisconsin	Gary Andersen	December 10, 2014	Hired by Oregon State	Barry Alvarez (interim – bowl game)
Wisconsin	Barry Alvarez (interim)	December 17, 2014	for bowl game	Paul Chryst (permanent)

== Television viewers and ratings ==
=== Most watched regular season games ===
- Excludes Kickoff Games

All times Eastern. Rankings are from the AP Poll before (10/28) and the CFP Rankings thereafter.

Rank	Date	Matchup				Channel	Viewers (millions)	TV Rating	Significance
1	November 29, 7:45pm	No. 15 Auburn	44	No. 1 Alabama	55	ESPN	13.53	7.4	College GameDay/Rivalry
2	October 18, 8:00pm	No. 5 Notre Dame	27	No. 1 Florida State	31	ABC	13.25	7.9	College GameDay
3	November 15, 3:30pm	No. 1 Mississippi State	20	No. 5 Alabama	25	CBS	10.27	6.4	College GameDay/Rivalry
4	November 8, 8:00pm	No. 5 Alabama	20	No. 16 LSU	13	CBS	9.11	5.3	Rivalry
5	November 15, 8:00pm	No. 2 Florida State	30	Miami (FL)	26	ABC	8.74	5.3	Rivalry
6	November 29, 12:00pm	Michigan	28	No. 6 Ohio State	42	ABC	8.23	4.9	Rivalry
7	September 20, 3:30pm	Florida	21	No. 3 Alabama	42	CBS	7.95	5.1	Rivalry
8	September 20, 8:00pm	No. 22 Clemson	17	No. 1 Florida State	23	ABC	7.34	4.5	Rivalry
9	November 8, 3:30pm	Texas A&M	41	No. 3 Auburn	38	CBS	7.21	4.4	
10	November 8, 8:00pm	No. 14 Ohio State	49	No. 8 Michigan State	37	ABC	6.83	3.9	College GameDay

=== Kickoff games ===
All times Eastern. Rankings are from the AP Poll.

Rank	Date	Matchup				Channel	Viewers (millions)	TV Rating	Game	Location
1	August 30, 3:30pm	No. 2 Alabama	33	West Virginia	23	Regional ABC	6.4	4	Chick-fil-A Kickoff Game	Georgia Dome, Atlanta
2	August 30, 8:00pm	Oklahoma State	31	No. 1 Florida State	37	ABC	6.03	2.4	Cowboys Classic	AT&T Stadium, Arlington, Texas
3	August 30, 9:00pm	No. 13 LSU	28	No. 14 Wisconsin	24	ESPN	4.68	2.8	Texas Kickoff	Reliant Stadium, Houston
4	August 28, 8:00pm	Boise State	13	No. 18 Ole Miss	35	ESPN	2.42	1.5	Chick-fil-A Kickoff Game	Georgia Dome, Atlanta

=== Conference championship games ===
All times Eastern. Rankings are from the CFP Rankings.

Rank	Date	Matchup				Channel	Viewers (millions)	TV Rating	Conference	Location
1	December 6, 4:00pm	No. 1 Alabama	42	No. 16 Missouri	13	CBS	12.8	7.8	SEC	Georgia Dome, Atlanta
2	December 6, 8:00pm	No. 4 Florida State	37	No. 11 Georgia Tech	35	ABC	10.1	6.2	ACC	Bank of America Stadium, Charlotte, North Carolina
3	December 6, 8:00pm	No. 13 Wisconsin	0	No. 5 Ohio State	59	FOX	6.13	3.5	Big Ten	Lucas Oil Stadium, Indianapolis
4	December 5, 9:00pm	No. 7 Arizona	13	No. 2 Oregon	51	FOX	6.00	3.7	Pac-12	Levi's Stadium, Santa Clara, California
5	December 6, 10:00pm	Fresno State	14	No. 22 Boise State	28	CBS	1.53	1.0	MW	Albertsons Stadium, Boise, Idaho
6	December 6, 12:00pm	Louisiana Tech	23	Marshall	26	ESPN2	0.725	0.5	C-USA	Joan C. Edwards Stadium, Huntington, West Virginia
7	December 5, 7:00pm	Bowling Green	17	Northern Illinois	51	ESPN2	0.692	0.5	MAC	Ford Field, Detroit

=== College Football Playoff ===
All times Eastern. Rankings are from the CFP Rankings.

Game	Date		Matchup				Channel	Viewers (millions)	TV Rating
Rose Bowl	January 1, 2015	5:00pm	No. 3 Florida State	20	No. 2 Oregon	59	ESPN	28.2	14.8
Sugar Bowl	January 1, 2015	8:00pm	No. 4 Ohio State	42	No. 1 Alabama	35	ESPN	28.3	15.2
National Championship	January 12, 2015	8:30pm	No. 4 Ohio State	42	No. 2 Oregon	20	ESPN	33.4^	18.2

^Does not include viewers from ESPN Megacast which also included channels ESPN2, ESPNU, ESPNews, ESPN Classic, and ESPN Deportes. 34.1 Million viewers for all channels combined.

== Attendances ==
Average home attendance top 30:

Rank	Team	G	Total	Average
1	Ohio State Buckeyes	7	744,075	106,296
2	Texas A&M Aggies	6	630,735	105,123
3	Michigan Wolverines	7	734,364	104,909
4	LSU Tigers	7	712,063	101,723
5	Penn State Nittany Lions	7	711,358	101,623
6	Alabama Crimson Tide	7	710,736	101,534
7	Tennessee Volunteers	7	698,276	99,754
8	Texas Longhorns	6	564,618	94,103
9	Georgia Bulldogs	7	649,222	92,746
10	Nebraska Cornhuskers	7	638,744	91,249
11	Auburn Tigers	7	612,157	87,451
12	Florida Gators	6	515,001	85,834
13	Oklahoma Sooners	6	510,972	85,162
14	Florida State Seminoles	7	575,478	82,211
15	Clemson Tigers	7	572,262	81,752
16	South Carolina Gamecocks	7	569,664	81,381
17	Notre Dame Fighting Irish	6	484,770	80,795
18	Wisconsin Badgers	7	556,642	79,520
19	UCLA Bruins	6	459,901	76,650
20	Michigan State Spartans	7	522,765	74,681
21	USC Trojans	6	439,630	73,272
22	Iowa Hawkeyes	7	472,584	67,512
23	Arkansas Razorbacks	6	399,124	66,521
24	Missouri Tigers	7	456,996	65,285
25	Washington Huskies	7	451,555	64,508
26	Ole Miss Rebels	7	430,829	61,547
27	Virginia Tech Hokies	7	428,099	61,157
28	Mississippi State Bulldogs	7	427,892	61,127
29	Texas Tech Red Raiders	6	353,603	58,934
30	Kentucky Wildcats	7	403,002	57,572
