= Gary Andersen =

American football player and coach (born 1964)

Current position
- Title: Analyst
- Team: BYU
- Conference: Big 12

Biographical details
- Born: February 19, 1964 (age 62); Salt Lake City, Utah, U.S.

Playing career
- 1983–1984: Ricks
- 1985–1986: Utah
- Position: Center

Coaching career (HC unless noted)
- 1988: Southeastern Louisiana (AHC/OC)
- 1989–1991: Ricks (OL)
- 1992–1993: Idaho State (DL)
- 1994: Park City HS (UT)
- 1995–1996: Northern Arizona (AHC/DL/ST)
- 1997–2000: Utah (DT/SDE)
- 2001–2002: Utah (AHC/DT/ST)
- 2003: Southern Utah
- 2004: Utah (DL)
- 2005–2008: Utah (AHC/DC/DL)
- 2009–2012: Utah State
- 2013–2014: Wisconsin
- 2015–2017: Oregon State
- 2018: Utah (AHC / defensive assistant)
- 2019–2020: Utah State
- 2021–2022: Weber State (analyst)
- 2024–present: BYU (analyst)

Head coaching record
- Overall: 63–70
- Bowls: 1–3

Accomplishments and honors

Championships
- 1 WAC (2012); 1 Big Ten West Division (2014)

Awards
- WAC Coach of the Year (2012)

Gary Lee Andersen (born February 19, 1964) is an American football coach who was most recently head football coach at Utah State University. Andersen has also been the head football coach of Southern Utah (2003), Wisconsin (2013–2014), and Oregon State (2015–2017). He served three years as the defensive coordinator at Utah, where he coached the 2008 Utes team that went undefeated and beat Alabama in the Sugar Bowl to finish the season ranked second in the nation. He is currently an analyst at BYU.

== Playing career ==
Andersen began his football career playing at Cottonwood High School, where he lettered in football for two years. After high school, he played center at Ricks College (now Brigham Young University–Idaho) in Rexburg, Idaho, for two seasons. As a freshman he was second team All-Conference and Ricks finished the season ranked fourth in the nation. In 1984, he was a First Team All-America selection and team captain as he helped Ricks to a number two ranking in the nation. He transferred to the University of Utah in Salt Lake City, where he lettered two years for the Utes and graduated in 1986 with a bachelor's degree in political science.

== Coaching career ==
=== Utah ===
Andersen returned to his alma mater in 1997, when he was hired by Ron McBride, his former offensive line coach with the Utes, to be defensive tackles coach. After McBride was fired as Utah's head coach at the end of the 2002 season, Andersen left to be head coach at Southern Utah University. Andersen only spent one season with the Thunderbirds and returned to Utah in 2004 when he was hired by Urban Meyer as the defensive line coach. He was the assistant head coach, defensive coordinator and defensive line coach from 2005 to 2008 and was a 2008 finalist for the Broyles Award, given annually to the nation's top college football assistant coach.

=== First stint at Utah State ===
Andersen was the head coach at Utah State for four seasons, beginning with 4–8 records in 2009 and 2010. His first winning season at Utah State came in 2011 (7–6) and his fourth and final year was the most successful, as the 2012 Aggies won 11 games and lost only two (the two losses were by 2 and 3 points against Wisconsin and BYU, respectively), and finished #16 in the final AP poll.

=== Wisconsin ===
Andersen was introduced as the new head coach at Wisconsin (which beat Utah State in an early season game in 2012) on December 21, 2012, to replace Bret Bielema, who left for Arkansas. After Andersen decided to leave Utah State for the Wisconsin job, he called every one of his players at Utah State individually to inform them personally of his decision. In 2013, Andersen's first win as a Wisconsin coach was a 45–0 win against Massachusetts. Andersen's final 2013 record was 9–4.

The 2014 regular season ended with the Badgers taking 1st place in the West division with a 10–2 record. Wisconsin played Ohio State for the conference title in the 2014 Big Ten Championship Game where the Badgers lost to Ohio State 59–0. Andersen left Wisconsin four days later, having taken the vacant head coaching position at Oregon State. Andersen cited family as his rationale for taking the Oregon State position while it was reported by some media outlets, such as Fox Sports and Sports Illustrated, that Andersen was frustrated with Wisconsin's high admissions standards for athletes. Those reports turned out to be accurate, and were confirmed by Andersen in January 2015.

Andersen had to pay a $3 million buyout for departing within the first two years of his contract, which was set through January 2019.

=== Oregon State ===
Andersen was announced as the new head coach of Oregon State on December 10, 2014. Andersen replaced the previous coach at Oregon State, Mike Riley, who left for the same position at Nebraska. On October 9, 2017, Andersen and Oregon State football parted ways with him forgoing $12 million left on his contract.

=== Return to Utah ===
On January 2, 2018, it was announced that Andersen would be returning to Utah for a 3rd time as an associate head coach and defensive assistant.

=== Second stint at Utah State ===
On December 9, 2018, Andersen was named head coach at Utah State for the second time, replacing the man who replaced him six years earlier in Matt Wells, who left for the Texas Tech head coaching job. Utah State fired Andersen on November 7, 2020, after the team started 0–3.

== Head coaching record ==
Year	Team	Overall	Conference	Standing	Bowl/playoffs	Coaches^{#}	AP^{°}
Southern Utah Thunderbirds (NCAA Division I-AA independent) (2003)
2003	Southern Utah	4–7					
Southern Utah:		4–7					
Utah State Aggies (Western Athletic Conference) (2009–2012)
2009	Utah State	4–8	3–5	T–5th			
2010	Utah State	4–8	2–6	7th			
2011	Utah State	7–6	5–2	T–2nd	L Famous Idaho Potato		
2012	Utah State	11–2	6–0	1st	W Famous Idaho Potato	17	16
Wisconsin Badgers (Big Ten Conference) (2013–2014)
2013	Wisconsin	9–4	6–2	2nd (Leaders)	L Capital One	21	22
2014	Wisconsin	10–3	7–1	1st (West)	Outback (Note: Andersen left Wisconsin before the bowl game and the ranking reflects the team's ranking at the time of Andersen's departure.)	17	17
Wisconsin:		19–7	13–3				
Oregon State Beavers (Pac-12 Conference) (2015–2017)
2015	Oregon State	2–10	0–9	6th (North)			
2016	Oregon State	4–8	3–6	T–4th (North)			
2017	Oregon State	1–5 (Note: Andersen was the head coach for the first six games of the season. On October 9, 2017, Cory Hall was named interim head coach after the university and Andersen mutually agreed to part ways.)	0–3	(North)			
Oregon State:		7–23	3–18				
Utah State Aggies (Mountain West Conference) (2019–2020)
2019	Utah State	7–6	6–2	3rd (Mountain)	L Frisco		
2020	Utah State	0–3 (Note: Andersen was the head coach for the first three games of the season. Utah State and Anderson parted ways on November 7, 2020.)	0–3				
Utah State:		33–33	22–18				
Total:		63–70					
National championship Conference title Conference division title or championship game berth
^{#}Rankings from final Coaches Poll.; ^{°}Rankings from final AP Poll.
