= 2014 Big Ten Football Championship Game =

- Conference Championship
Wisconsin Badgers	Ohio State Buckeyes
(10–2)	(11–1)
0	59
Head coach: Gary Andersen	Head coach: Urban Meyer
AP / Coaches / CFP; 11 / 11 / 13	AP / Coaches / CFP; 6 / 6 / 5
	1	2	3	4	Total
Wisconsin	0	0	0	0	0
Ohio State	14	24	7	14	59
- Date: December 6, 2014
- Season: 2014
- Stadium: Lucas Oil Stadium
- Location: Indianapolis, IN
- MVP: Cardale Jones (OSU)
- Favorite: Wisconsin by 4
- Referee: Mike Cannon
- Attendance: 60,229

United States TV coverage
- Network: Fox
- Announcers: Gus Johnson and Charles Davis
- Nielsen ratings: 3.5 (6.1 million viewers)

2014 Big Ten Conference football standings
	Conf.			Overall
Team	W		L	W		L
East Division
No. 1 Ohio State x$#^	8	–	0	14	–	1
No. T–5 Michigan State	7	–	1	11	–	2
Maryland	4	–	4	7	–	6
Rutgers	3	–	5	8	–	5
Michigan	3	–	5	5	–	7
Penn State	2	–	6	7	–	6
Indiana	1	–	7	4	–	8
West Division
No. 13 Wisconsin x	7	–	1	11	–	3
Minnesota	5	–	3	8	–	5
Nebraska	5	–	3	9	–	4
Iowa	4	–	4	7	–	6
Illinois	3	–	5	6	–	7
Northwestern	3	–	5	5	–	7
Purdue	1	–	7	3	–	9
Championship: Ohio State 59, Wisconsin 0
# – College Football Playoff champion; ^ – College Football Playoff participant; $ – Conference champion; x – Division champion/co-champions; Rankings from AP Poll

The 2014 Big Ten Football Championship Game was a college football game played on December 6, 2014, at Lucas Oil Stadium in Indianapolis, Indiana. It was the fourth annual Big Ten Football Championship Game and it determined the 2014 champion of the Big Ten Conference. The game featured the Ohio State Buckeyes, champions of the East Division, and the West Division champion Wisconsin Badgers. Wisconsin was favored by 4.5 points over Ohio State, but Ohio State won by a score of 59–0. It was the first shutout in Big Ten Football Championship Game history.

== History ==
The 2014 Championship Game was the fourth held in the Big Ten's 119-year history, and the first to feature the conference's new division alignment of East and West. The first three games, in 2011, 2012, and 2013, were played under the previous division alignment of Legends and Leaders.

== Teams ==
Multiple members of both teams' coaching staff have worked together in the past. In 2004 Gary Andersen, current-Badgers head coach, was the defensive line coach under Urban Meyer, then head coach of the Utah Utes. Together Utah finished the 2004 season 11–0. After that season Meyer became head coach for the Florida Gators and Gary Andersen became defensive coordinator for the Utes. Ohio State's co-offensive coordinator Tom Herman and Wisconsin's defensive coordinator Dave Aranda both attended college together, at California Lutheran University, and were roommates for a semester.

=== Ohio State ===
Ohio State came into the Big Ten Championship Game ranked #5 in the AP Poll. With their starting quarterback, redshirt freshman J. T. Barrett, out for the rest of the season after suffering a fractured ankle against Michigan the previous week, redshirt sophomore Cardale Jones would receive the first start of his career. The Buckeyes defense was led by Joey Bosa who was the 2014 Big Ten defensive player of the year.

With only one loss on their record, from Virginia Tech in week 2, OSU defeated Michigan State to take the lead of the Big Ten East division on November 8.

The Buckeyes offense was ranked 5th in points scored with 44.1 points per game, and was fairly balanced with 246 passing yards per game compared to 257 rushing yards per game. The Buckeyes defense was ranked 29th in points against, allowing an average of 22.9 points per game.

=== Wisconsin ===
Wisconsin came into the Big Ten Championship Game ranked #11 in the AP Poll. The Badgers were led by the 2014 Big Ten offensive player of the year, running back Melvin Gordon, who had set numerous school, Big Ten and NCAA records throughout the season and led the league in rushing yards (2,260) and touchdowns (26).

At the start of November the Big Ten West division was a four-way tie between the Nebraska Cornhuskers, Iowa Hawkeyes, Minnesota Golden Gophers and Badgers. The Badgers clinched the Big Ten West division by defeating their rivals, Minnesota, in the last game of the season.

The Badgers offense was ranked 15th in points scored with 37.5 points per game, and was centered around the rushing game which was 3rd overall with 334.3 rushing yards per game compared to their 147.8 passing yards per game which came in at 119th overall. Their defense, despite having to replace all front seven starters, was ranked in the top 10 for all four defensive categories, 2nd in total defense with 260.3 yards per game, 4th in scoring defense with 16.8, 8th in rushing defense with 103.8 yards allowed per game and 2nd in passing defense with 156.6 yards allowed per game.

== Scoring summary ==
1st quarter scoring:

- OSU: Devin Smith 39-yard pass from Cardale Jones (Sean Nuernberger kick) (13:01) (7–0 OSU)
- OSU: Ezekiel Elliott 81-yard run (Sean Nuernberger kick) (4:06) (14–0 OSU)

2nd quarter scoring:

- OSU: Sean Nuernberger 23-yard field goal (14:14) (17–0 OSU)
- OSU: Devin Smith 44-yard pass from Cardale Jones (Sean Nuernberger kick) (11:09) (24–0 OSU)
- OSU: Ezekiel Elliott 14-yard run (Sean Nuernberger kick) (6:36) (31–0 OSU)
- OSU: Joey Bosa 4-yard fumble return (Sean Nuernberger kick) (0:36) (38–0 OSU)

3rd quarter scoring:

- OSU: Devin Smith 42-yard pass from Cardale Jones (Sean Nuernberger kick) (9:24) (45–0 OSU)

4th quarter scoring:

- OSU: Curtis Samuel 12-yard run (Sean Nuernberger kick) (11:39) (52–0 OSU)
- OSU: Curtis Samuel 1-yard run (Sean Nuernberger kick) (2:25) (59–0 OSU)

Kickoff time: 8:18 p.m. • End of Game: 11:54 p.m. • Total elapsed time: 3 hours 36 minutes

== Statistics ==
Statistics	OSU	WIS
First downs	24	18
Total offense, plays – yards	56–558	80–258
Rushes-yards (net)	301	71
Passing yards (net)	257	187
Passes, Comp-Att-Td-Int	12–18-3–0	17–43-0–3
Time of Possession	26:05	33:55
Penalties	5–44	3–23
Turnovers	0	4

== Legacy ==
In 2019 Meyer said that he intentionally ran up the score against Wisconsin to help his team be chosen for the College Football Playoff. Criticizing the subjectivity of the selection process, Meyer said that he left the starting lineup in the game despite Ohio State ahead 45–0 in the third quarter—risking players' health by not resting the starters, and poor sportsmanship—because "I don't think the 'eye test' and 'people think' is going to get enough to bump TCU and Baylor". He continued, "I had a job to do, and that was to get Ohio State in the playoff. Do I think that's right? That's wrong", proposing a selection system based on defined criteria.

== See also ==
- List of Big Ten Conference football champions
