= 2015 in American football =

== NCAA Bowl games ==
- December 20, 2014 – January 12, 2015: 2014–15 NCAA football bowl games

=== Regular bowl games ===
- December 20, 2014 – January 4, 2015: 2014–15 NCAA non-CFP bowl games
  - December 20, 2014: 2014 R+L Carriers New Orleans Bowl
    - The Louisiana–Lafayette Ragin' Cajuns defeated the Nevada Wolf Pack 16–3.
  - December 20, 2014: 2014 Gildan New Mexico Bowl in Albuquerque
    - The Utah State Aggies defeated the UTEP Miners 21–6.
  - December 20, 2014: 2014 Royal Purple Las Vegas Bowl
    - The Utah Utes defeated the Colorado State Rams 45–10.
  - December 20, 2014: 2014 Famous Idaho Potato Bowl in Boise
    - The Air Force Falcons defeated the Western Michigan Broncos 38–24.
  - December 20, 2014: 2014 Camellia Bowl in Montgomery, Alabama (returning as an NCAA Division I bowl game again)
    - The Bowling Green Falcons defeated the South Alabama Jaguars 33–28.
  - December 22, 2014: 2014 Miami Beach Bowl (debut event)
    - The Memphis Tigers defeated the BYU Cougars 55–48.
  - December 23, 2014: 2014 Boca Raton Bowl in Florida
    - The Marshall Thundering Herd defeated the Northern Illinois Huskies 52–23.
  - December 23, 2014: 2014 San Diego County Credit Union Poinsettia Bowl
    - The Navy Midshipmen defeated the San Diego State Aztecs 17–16.
  - December 24, 2014: 2014 Bahamas Bowl in Nassau (debut event)
    - The Western Kentucky Hilltoppers defeated the Central Michigan Chippewas 49–48.
  - December 24, 2014: 2014 Hawaii Bowl in Honolulu
    - The Rice Owls defeated the Fresno State Bulldogs 30–6.
  - December 26, 2014: 2014 Zaxby's Heart of Dallas Bowl
    - The Louisiana Tech Bulldogs defeated the Illinois Fighting Illini 35–18.
  - December 26, 2014: 2014 Quick Lane Bowl in Detroit (debut event)
    - The Rutgers Scarlet Knights defeated the North Carolina Tar Heels 40–21.
  - December 26, 2014: 2014 St. Petersburg Bowl in St. Petersburg, Florida
    - The NC State Wolfpack defeated the UCF Knights 34–27.
  - December 27, 2014: 2014 Military Bowl in Annapolis, Maryland
    - The Virginia Tech Hokies defeated the Cincinnati Bearcats 33–17.
  - December 27, 2014: 2014 Sun Bowl in El Paso, Texas
    - The Arizona State Sun Devils defeated the Duke Blue Devils 36–31.
  - December 27, 2014: 2014 Independence Bowl in Shreveport, Louisiana
    - The South Carolina Gamecocks defeated the Miami Hurricanes 24–21.
  - December 27, 2014: 2014 Pinstripe Bowl in the Bronx (New York City)
    - The Penn State Nittany Lions defeated the Boston College Eagles 31–30.
  - December 27, 2014: 2014 Holiday Bowl in San Diego
    - The USC Trojans defeated the Nebraska Cornhuskers 45–42.
  - December 29, 2014: 2014 Liberty Bowl in Memphis, Tennessee
    - The Texas A&M Aggies defeated the West Virginia Mountaineers 45–37.
  - December 29, 2014: 2014 Russell Athletic Bowl in Orlando, Florida
    - The Clemson Tigers defeated the Oklahoma Sooners 40–6.
  - December 29, 2014: 2014 Texas Bowl in Houston
    - The Arkansas Razorbacks defeated the Texas Longhorns 31–7.
  - December 30, 2014: 2014 Music City Bowl in Nashville, Tennessee
    - The Notre Dame Fighting Irish defeated the LSU Tigers 31–28.
  - December 30, 2014: 2014 Belk Bowl in Charlotte, North Carolina
    - The Georgia Bulldogs defeated the Louisville Cardinals 37–14.
  - December 30, 2014: 2014 Foster Farms Bowl in Santa Clara, California
    - The Stanford Cardinal defeated the Maryland Terrapins 45–21.
  - January 1, 2015: 2015 Citrus Bowl in Orlando, Florida
    - The Missouri Tigers defeated the Minnesota Golden Gophers 33–17.
  - January 1, 2015: 2015 Outback Bowl in Tampa, Florida
    - The Wisconsin Badgers defeated the Auburn Tigers, 34–31, after overtime.
  - January 2, 2015: 2015 Armed Forces Bowl in Fort Worth, Texas
    - The Houston Cougars defeated the Pittsburgh Panthers 35–34.
  - January 2, 2015: 2015 TaxSlayer Bowl in Jacksonville, Florida
    - The Tennessee Volunteers defeated the Iowa Hawkeyes 45–28.
  - January 2, 2015: 2015 Alamo Bowl in San Antonio
    - The UCLA Bruins defeated the Kansas State Wildcats 40–35.
  - January 2, 2015: 2015 Cactus Bowl in Tempe, Arizona
    - The Oklahoma State Cowboys defeated the Washington Huskies 30–22.
  - January 3, 2015: 2015 Birmingham Bowl in Birmingham, Alabama
    - The Florida Gators defeated the East Carolina Pirates 28–20.
  - January 4, 2015: 2015 GoDaddy Bowl in Mobile, Alabama
    - The Toledo Rockets defeated the Arkansas State Red Wolves 63–44.

=== College Football Playoff (CFP) bowl games ===
- December 31, 2014 and January 1, 2015: 2014–15 CFP bowl games
  - December 31: 2014 Chick-fil-A Peach Bowl in Atlanta
    - The TCU Horned Frogs defeated the Ole Miss Rebels 42–3.
  - December 31: 2014 Vizio Fiesta Bowl in Glendale, Arizona
    - The Boise State Broncos defeated the Arizona Wildcats 38–30.
  - December 31: 2014 Capital One Orange Bowl in Miami Gardens, Florida
    - The Georgia Tech Yellow Jackets defeated the Mississippi State Bulldogs 42–20.
  - January 1: 2015 Goodyear Cotton Bowl Classic in Arlington, Texas
    - The Michigan State Spartans defeated the Baylor Bears 42–41.
  - January 1: 2015 Rose Bowl Game presented by Northwestern Mutual in Pasadena, California
    - The Oregon Ducks defeated the Florida State Seminoles 59–20.
  - January 1: 2015 Allstate Sugar Bowl in New Orleans
    - The Ohio State Buckeyes defeated the Alabama Crimson Tide 42–35.
- Oregon and Ohio State advanced to the 2015 College Football Playoff National Championship.

=== College Football Playoff National Championship ===
- January 12: 2015 College Football Playoff National Championship in Arlington, Texas (debut event)
  - The Ohio State Buckeyes defeat the Oregon Ducks 42–20. It is the Buckeyes' eighth national title and first since 2002.

== Other American football events ==
- January 25: 2015 Pro Bowl in Glendale, Arizona (University of Phoenix Stadium)
  - Team Michael Irvin defeated Team Cris Carter 32–28.
  - Offensive MVP: Matthew Stafford (Detroit Lions)
  - Defensive MVP: J. J. Watt (Houston Texans)
- February 1: Super Bowl XLIX in the same location as the 2015 Pro Bowl venue.
  - The New England Patriots defeated the Seattle Seahawks, 28–24, to win their fourth Super Bowl title.
  - Super Bowl MVP: Tom Brady (New England Patriots)
- April 30 – May 2: 2015 NFL draft in Chicago, at the Auditorium Theatre
  - #1 pick: Jameis Winston (Florida State Seminoles) to the Tampa Bay Buccaneers
- July 8 – 19: 2015 IFAF World Championship in Canton, Ohio
  - The United States defeated Japan, 59–12, to win their third consecutive IFAF World Championship title. Mexico won the bronze medal.
- September 10, 2015 – January 3, 2016: 2015 NFL season

== Pro Football Hall of Fame ==
- Class of 2015:
  - Jerome Bettis, player
  - Tim Brown, player
  - Charles Haley, player
  - Bill Polian, general manager
  - Junior Seau, player
  - Will Shields, player
  - Mick Tingelhoff, player
  - Ron Wolf, general manager
