= 2014 Conference USA football season =

- League: NCAA Division I Football Bowl Subdivision
- Sport: Football
- Duration: August 29, 2014 through December 26, 2014
- Teams: 13
- TV partner(s): Fox Sports, CBS Sports Network, ESPN, American Sports Network

2015 NFL Draft
- Top draft pick: CB D'Joun Smith, FAU
- Picked by: Indianapolis Colts, 65th overall

Regular season
- Season MVP: QB Brandon Doughty, WKU
- East champions: Marshall
- West champions: Louisiana Tech

Championship Game
- Champions: Marshall
- Runners-up: Louisiana Tech
- Finals MVP: K Justin Haig, Marshall

Football seasons
- ← 2013 2015 →

2014 Conference USA football standings
	Conf.			Overall
Team	W		L	W		L
East Division
No. 23 Marshall x$	7	–	1	13	–	1
Middle Tennessee	5	–	3	6	–	6
Western Kentucky	4	–	4	8	–	5
UAB	4	–	4	6	–	6
Old Dominion*	4	–	4	6	–	6
FIU	3	–	5	4	–	8
Florida Atlantic	2	–	6	3	–	9
West Division
Louisiana Tech x	7	–	1	9	–	5
Rice	5	–	3	8	–	5
UTEP	5	–	3	7	–	6
UTSA	3	–	5	4	–	8
North Texas	2	–	6	4	–	8
Southern Miss	1	–	7	3	–	9
Championship: Marshall 26, Louisiana Tech 23
$ – Conference champion; x – Division champion/co-champions; * Ineligible for postseason bowl due to transition from FCS; As of 22:24, 20 December 2014 (UTC); Rankings from AP Poll

The 2014 Conference USA football season was a part of the 2014 NCAA Division I FBS football season and was played from August 2014 through January 2015. The 2014 football season marks the 20th season of the Conference USA's existence and 19th of football competition; although C-USA was established in 1995, it did not begin football competition until 1996.

== 2014 season ==
=== Before the season ===
Conference USA football added two new members in 2014 (Old Dominion (transitioning from FCS) and Western Kentucky (from the Sun Belt Conference)) and lost three from the previous season (East Carolina, Tulane, and Tulsa) to the American Athletic Conference.

In preseason polls, Marshall was favored to win the East Division and the 2014 conference title followed by North Texas to win the West Division. Marshall was also the only team in the conference to have received votes from the AP and Coaches' Poll Preseason Rankings before the season.

=== East Division ===
In the first East Division game of the season, Middle Tennessee defeated Western Kentucky 50–47 in triple overtime, bringing the Blue Raiders to the top of the division and the Hilltoppers to the bottom. A week later after the Blue Raiders defeated the Hilltoppers, newcomers Old Dominion defeated the last year conference champions Rice, putting the Monarchs to first in the east division surpassing Middle Tennessee. In the following week, Old Dominion received its first conference loss against Middle Tennessee, bringing the undefeated Blue Raiders back on top on the East Division standings. After winning 3 conference games, Middle Tennessee then lost for the first time in conference play to the undefeated Marshall Thundering Herd, the projected winner of the conference. Marshall would go on to become East Division champions after defeating the defending conference champions, Rice, and after FIU defeated Middle Tennessee to put the Thundering Herd into the conference championship for the second time in back to back seasons.

=== West Division ===
In the first conference game of the season, the projected division winner, North Texas lost 21–42 to Louisiana Tech, bringing the Bulldogs to the top of the division and the Mean Green to the bottom. Louisiana Tech would go on to win the West Division 7–1, with wins over North Texas, Southern Miss, UTEP, UTSA, Southern Miss, Western Kentucky, UAB, and Rice and with a loss to Old Dominion.

=== Championship Game ===
At the conclusion of the 2014 regular season the tenth C-USA championship game was played at Marshall on December 6, 2014 where the East Division Champs, Marshall, defeated the West Division Champs, Louisiana Tech, 26-23 to claim the conference championship.

=== After the season ===
On December 2, 2014, UAB announced that the school will be cutting their football program after the 2014 season. Following public outcry and a fundraising push, UAB reinstated their football program, with the program being relaunched for the 2017 season.

== Bowl games ==
=== Bowl eligibility ===
==== Bowl eligible ====
- Louisiana Tech
- Marshall
- Middle Tennessee
- Rice
- UAB
- UTEP
- Western Kentucky

==== Bowl ineligible ====
- Florida Atlantic
- Florida International
- North Texas
- Old Dominion
- Southern Miss
- UTSA

=== Results ===
Conference USA bowl games for the 2014 season are:

Bowl Game	Date	Site	Television	Time (EST)	C-USA Team	Opponent	Score	Attendance
New Mexico Bowl	December 20	University Stadium • Albuquerque, New Mexico	ESPN	2:20 p.m.	UTEP	Utah State	L 6–21	28,725
Boca Raton Bowl	December 23	FAU Stadium • Boca Raton, Florida	ESPN	6:00 p.m.	Marshall	Northern Illinois	W 52–23	29,419
Bahamas Bowl	December 24	Thomas Robinson Stadium • Nassau, Bahamas	ESPN	12:00 p.m.	Western Kentucky	Central Michigan	W 49–48	13,667
Hawaii Bowl	December 24	Aloha Stadium • Honolulu, HI	ESPN	8:00 p.m.	Rice	Fresno State	W 30–6	25,365
Heart of Dallas Bowl	December 26	Cotton Bowl • Dallas	ESPN	1:00 p.m.	Louisiana Tech	Illinois	W 35–18	31,297

All times Eastern Time Zone.

== Individual conference honors ==
2014 Conference Player of the Year and Coach of the Year awards

Award	Player	School
Most Valuable Player	Brandon Doughty	WKU
Offensive Player of the Year	Rakeem Cato	Marshall
Defensive Player of the Year	Neville Hewitt	Marshall
Special Teams Player of the Year	J.J. Nelson	UAB
Freshman of the Year	Ray Lawry	Old Dominion
Newcomer of the Year	Cody Sokol	Louisiana Tech
Coach of the Year	Doc Holliday	Marshall

== All-Conference players ==
Coaches All-Conference Selections

Position	Player	Class	Team
First Team Offense (Coaches)
QB	Rakeem Cato	SR	Marshall
RB	Devon Johnson	SR	Marshall
RB	Jordan Howard	SO	UAB
OL	Chris Jasperse	SR	Marshall
OL	Mitchell Bell	SR	Louisiana Tech
OL	Clint Van Horn	JR	Marshall
OL	Josh Mann	SR	Old Dominion
OL	Cyril Lemon	SR	North Texas
TE	Jonnu Smith	SO	FIU
WR	Tommy Shuler	SR	Marshall
WR	Antonio Vaughan	SR	Old Dominion
WR	Lucky Whitehead	SR	Florida Atlantic
First Team Defense (Coaches)
DL	Brian Nordstrom	JR	Rice
DL	Rakeem Nunez-Roches	SR	Southern Miss
DL	Diaheem Watkins	SR	UAB
DL	James Rouse	SR	Marshall
LB	Neville Hewitt	SR	Marshall
LB	Derek Akunne	SR	North Texas
LB	Andrae Kirk	SR	Florida Atlantic
DB	Richard Leonard	JR	FIU
DB	Kevin Byard	JR	Middle Tennessee
DB	Xavier Woods	SO	Louisiana Tech
DB	Darryl Roberts	SR	Marshall
First Team Special Teams (Coaches)
K	Corey Acosta	SR	Southern Miss
P	Tyler Williams	JR	Marshall
KR	J.J. Nelson	SR	UAB
PR	Richard Leonard	JR	FIU
LS	Matt Cincotta	JR	Marshall

Position	Player	Class	Team
Second Team Offense (Coaches)
QB	Brandon Doughty	SR	WKU
RB	Kenneth Dixon	JR	Louisiana Tech
RB	Aaron Jones	SO	UTEP
RB	Leon Allen	JR	WKU
OL	Brian O'Leary	SR	UAB
OL	Jerell Watkins	SR	UTEP
OL	Isaiah Anderson	SR	Middle Tennessee
OL	Cameron Clemmons	SR	WKU
OL	Darius Johnson	JR	Middle Tennessee
OL	Nico Carlson	SR	Rice
TE	Kennard Backman	SR	UAB
WR	Jared Dangerfield	JR	WKU
WR	Trent Taylor	SO	Louisiana Tech
WR	Jordan Taylor	SR	Rice
Second Team Defense (Coaches)
DL	Arnold Blackmon	SR	Marshall
DL	Michael Wakefield	JR	FIU
DL	Houston Bates	SR	Louisiana Tech
DL	Robert Singletary	SR	UTSA
LB	Jake Ganus	JR	UAB
LB	T.T. Barber	JR	Middle Tennessee
LB	Jermaine Holmes	SR	Marshall
DB	Triston Wade	SR	UTSA
DB	D'Joun Smith	SR	Florida Atlantic
DB	James Jones	SR	North Texas
DB	Bryce Callahan	SR	Rice
DB	Wonderful Terry	JR	WKU
Second Team Special Teams (Coaches)
K	Sean Ianno	SR	UTSA
P	Dalton Schomp	SO	Florida Atlantic
KR	Autrey Golden	JR	UTEP
PR	J.J. Nelson	SR	UAB
LS	Jesse Medrano	SR	UTSA

== Attendance ==
Team	Stadium	Capacity	Game 1	Game 2	Game 3	Game 4	Game 5	Game 6	Game 7	Game 8	Total	Average	% of Capacity
FIU	FIU Stadium	20,000	14,053	9,981	10,147	10,826	12,544	13,163	12,097	12,917	95,728	11,966	59.8%
Florida Atlantic	FAU Stadium	29,419	14,112	13,928	10,915	17,724	9,566	—	—	—	66,245	13,249	45.0%
Louisiana Tech	Joe Aillet Stadium	27,717	26,004	18,157	18,071	20,011	18,029	—	—	—	100,272	20,054	72.4%
Marshall	Joan C. Edwards Stadium	38,227	25,106	31,710	30,210	27,236	30,680	23,576	23,711	—	192,229	27,461	71.8%
Middle Tennessee	Johnny "Red" Floyd Stadium	30,788	15,605	24,911	14,022	18,717	18,952	12,243	—	—	104,450	17,408	56.5%
North Texas	Apogee Stadium	30,850	22,398	16,998	21,323	19,127	20,957	14,824	—	—	115,627	19,271	62.5%
Old Dominion	Foreman Field	20,118	20,118	20,118	20,118	20,118	20,118	20,118	—	—	120,708	20,118	100.0%
Rice	Rice Stadium	47,000	17,558	17,465	18,430	19,464	18,164	—	—	—	91,081	18,216	38.8%
Southern Miss	M. M. Roberts Stadium	36,000	26,448	21,836	24,756	23,343	22,949	17,103	—	—	136,435	22,739	63.2%
UAB	Legion Field	71,594	27,133	29,604	16,133	20,365	9,457	28,355	—	—	131,047	21,841	30.5%
UTEP	Sun Bowl Stadium	51,500	35,422	32,979	25,509	24,673	24,222	27,455	—	—	170,260	28,377	55.1%
UTSA	Alamodome	65,000	33,472	30,419	25,318	31,956	20,281	24,012	—	—	165,458	27,576	42.4%
WKU	Houchens Industries–L. T. Smith Stadium	22,113	17,215	14,923	17,886	18,472	16,819	12,518	—	—	97,833	16,306	73.7%
Total	–	–	–	–	–	–	–	–	–	–	1,587,373		–

== Membership ==
East Carolina, Tulane, and Tulsa left Conference USA, and joined the American Athletic Conference, the football-sponsoring offshoot of the original Big East, on July 1, 2014.

Old Dominion, which had moved five of its sports from its former home of the Colonial Athletic Association to C-USA for the 2012–13 school year, moved the rest of its athletic program to C-USA. ODU has an established FCS program that played as an FCS independent in 2013, and will join C-USA football as a provisional FBS member in 2014, and become fully bowl-eligible in 2015. Also Western Kentucky will join the conference from the Sun Belt Conference on July 1, 2014. Charlotte, which is a football team, that is initially provisional FBS member in 2014 and will bring football to C-USA in 2015. The 49ers joined from the Atlantic 10 Conference.

With Old Dominion and Western Kentucky makes the conference at 13 teams which will be both in the East Division, while Southern Miss moves from the East Division to the West. The East division consist of 7 members while the West division consists of 6 members.

East Division	West Division
Florida Atlantic	Louisiana Tech
FIU	North Texas
Marshall	Rice
Middle Tennessee	Southern Miss
Old Dominion	UTEP
UAB	UTSA
Western Kentucky	
