= 2014 Boca Raton Bowl =

- 1st Boca Raton Bowl
Marshall Thundering Herd	Northern Illinois Huskies
(12–1)	(11–2)
C-USA	MAC
52	23
Head coach: John "Doc" Holliday	Head coach: Rod Carey
	1	2	3	4	Total
Marshall	14	10	14	14	52
Northern Illinois	7	6	7	3	23
- Date: December 23, 2014
- Season: 2014
- Stadium: FAU Stadium
- Location: Boca Raton, Florida
- MVP: Marshall QB Rakeem Cato
- Favorite: Marshall by 8.5
- Referee: Rick Loumiet (Mtn. West)
- Attendance: 29,419
- Payout: US$400,000

United States TV coverage
- Network: ESPN/ESPN Radio
- Announcers: Dave LaMont, Desmond Howard, & Quint Kessenich (ESPN); Marc Kestecher, John Congemi, & Ian Fitzsimmons (ESPN Radio)

The 2014 Boca Raton Bowl was a post-season American college football bowl game that was played on December 23, 2014 at FAU Stadium on the campus of Florida Atlantic University in Boca Raton, Florida. The first edition of the Boca Raton Bowl, it featured the Conference USA champion Marshall Thundering Herd against the Mid-American Conference champion Northern Illinois Huskies. The game began at 6:00 p.m. EST and aired on ESPN. It was one of the 2014–15 bowl games that concluded the 2014 FBS football season. Marshall beat Northern Illinois by a score of 52–23.

== Teams ==
The game featured the Conference USA champion Marshall Thundering Herd against the Mid-American Conference champion Northern Illinois Huskies.

This was the eighth overall meeting between these two teams, with Northern Illinois previously leading the series 4–3. The previous time these two teams met was in 2001.

=== Marshall Thundering Herd ===
After finishing the regular season with a 12–1 record and winning their first Conference USA championship over the Louisiana Tech Bulldogs by a score of 26–23, the Thundering Herd accepted their bid to the Boca Raton Bowl.

This was Marshall's second Florida bowl game; they had previously won the 2011 Beef 'O' Brady's Bowl, defeating the FIU Panthers by a score of 20–10.

=== Northern Illinois Huskies ===
After finishing the regular season with an 11–2 record and winning the MAC Championship Game over the Bowling Green Falcons by a score of 51–17, the Huskies accepted their bid to the Boca Raton Bowl.

This was Northern Illinois' second bowl game in South Florida; in their most high-profile game to date, they had appeared in the 2013 Orange Bowl, losing to the Florida State Seminoles by a score of 31–10.

== Game summary ==
=== Scoring summary ===
Scoring summary

Quarter	Time	Drive			Team	Scoring information	Score	
Quarter	Time	Plays	Yards	TOP	Team	Scoring information	MRSH	NIU
1	7:33	7	67	2:17	NIU	Juwan Brescacin 19-yard touchdown reception from Drew Hare, Christian Hagan kick good	0	7
1	7:19	–	–	–	MRSH	Kickoff returned 93 yards for touchdown by Deandre Reaves, Justin Haig kick good	7	7
1	3:42	5	42	2:12	MRSH	Rakeem Cato 5-yard touchdown run, Haig kick good	14	7
2	11:51	9	69	2:41	MRSH	28-yard field goal by Justin Haig	17	7
2	7:31	10	64	4:20	NIU	19-yard field goal by Christian Hagan	17	10
2	5:29	6	65	2:02	MRSH	Devon Johnson 2-yard touchdown run, Haig kick good	24	10
2	0:07	8	49	1:39	NIU	30-yard field goal by Christian Hagan	24	13
3	6:39	9	56	4:10	MRSH	Tommy Shuler 6-yard touchdown reception from Rakeem Cato, Haig kick good	31	13
3	4:50	5	75	1:49	NIU	Cameron Stingily 24-yard touchdown run, Hagan kick good	31	20
3	2:06	11	68	2:44	MRSH	Angelo Jean-Louis 11-yard touchdown reception from Rakeem Cato, Haig kick good	38	20
4	11:48	9	70	3:51	MRSH	Deon-Tay McManus 27-yard touchdown reception from Rakeem Cato, Haig kick good	45	20
4	8:39	10	65	3:09	NIU	31-yard field goal by Christian Hagan	45	23
4	4:10	8	41	4:29	MRSH	Rakeem Cato 4-yard touchdown run, Haig kick good	52	23
"TOP" = time of possession. For other American football terms, see Glossary of American football.							52	23

=== Statistics ===
Statistics	MRSH	NIU
First downs	28	25
Plays–yards	75–505	78–425
Rushes–yards	38–224	50–200
Passing yards	281	225
Passing: Comp–Att–Int	25–37–0	15–28–0
Time of possession	29:18	30:42
