= 2014 Old Dominion Monarchs football team =

American college football season

2014 Old Dominion Monarchs football
- Conference: Conference USA
- East Division
- Record: 6–6 (4–4 C-USA)
- Head coach: Bobby Wilder (6th season)
- Offensive coordinator: Brian Scott (6th season)
- Offensive scheme: Hurry-up spread option
- Defensive coordinator: Rich Nagy (2nd season)
- Base defense: 3–3–5
- Home stadium: Foreman Field at S. B. Ballard Stadium

2014 Conference USA football standings
	Conf.			Overall
Team	W		L	W		L
East Division
No. 23 Marshall x$	7	–	1	13	–	1
Middle Tennessee	5	–	3	6	–	6
Western Kentucky	4	–	4	8	–	5
UAB	4	–	4	6	–	6
Old Dominion*	4	–	4	6	–	6
FIU	3	–	5	4	–	8
Florida Atlantic	2	–	6	3	–	9
West Division
Louisiana Tech x	7	–	1	9	–	5
Rice	5	–	3	8	–	5
UTEP	5	–	3	7	–	6
UTSA	3	–	5	4	–	8
North Texas	2	–	6	4	–	8
Southern Miss	1	–	7	3	–	9
Championship: Marshall 26, Louisiana Tech 23
$ – Conference champion; x – Division champion/co-champions; * Ineligible for postseason bowl due to transition from FCS; Rankings from AP Poll

The 2014 Old Dominion Monarchs football team represented Old Dominion University in the 2014 NCAA Division I FBS football season. They were led by sixth-year head coach Bobby Wilder and played their home games at Foreman Field at S. B. Ballard Stadium in Norfolk, Virginia. The 2014 season marked the inaugural season for the Monarchs as a member of the NCAA Division I Football Bowl Subdivision (FBS), joining Conference USA and competing in the East Division. Old Dominion finished the season 6–6 (4–4 in C-USA play) to finish in a three-way tie for third place in the East Division. Despite finishing 6–6, Old Dominion was not invited to a bowl game, as they were in the second of a two-year transition period to the FBS and was ineligible for postseason competition.

== Personnel ==
=== Coaching staff ===
Name	Position	Seasons at Old Dominion	Alma mater
Bobby Wilder	Head coach	6	University of Maine (1987)
Brian Scott	Associate head coach/Offensive line	6	University of Maine (2000)
Zohn Burden	Passing Game Coordinator/Wide receivers	6	Virginia Military Institute (2006)
Bill Dee	Running game coordinator/Offensive line	4	Mansfield (1975)
Darrell Perkins	Cornerbacks	1	University of Wyoming (1990)
Michael Zyskowski	Recruiting Coordinator/Running backs/Special Teams Coordinator	7	University of Maine (2006)
Kermit Buggs	Safeties	1	Norfolk State University (1995)
Jeff Comissiong	Assistant head coach/Defensive line	1	University of Maine (1997)
Rich Nagy	Defensive coordinator/linebackers	1	Trinity (1987)
Ron Whitcomb	Offensive coordinator/quarterbacks	8	University of Maine (2006)

== Schedule ==
Date	Time	Opponent	Site	TV	Result	Attendance
August 30	3:30 p.m.	Hampton*	Foreman Field; Norfolk, VA	ASN	W 41–28	20,118
September 6	6:00 p.m.	at NC State*	Carter–Finley Stadium; Raleigh, NC	ESPN3	L 34–46	55,390
September 13	6:00 p.m.	Eastern Michigan*	Foreman Field; Norfolk, VA	Cox 110	W 17–3	20,118
September 20	12:00 p.m.	at Rice	Rice Stadium; Houston, TX	FSN	W 45–42	17,558
September 26	8:00 p.m.	Middle Tennessee	Foreman Field; Norfolk, VA	FS1	L 28–41	20,118
October 4	12:00 p.m.	Marshall	Foreman Field; Norfolk, VA	FSN	L 14–56	20,118
October 11	8:00 p.m.	at UTEP	Sun Bowl; El Paso, TX	ASN	L 35–42	25,509
October 25	4:00 p.m.	at Western Kentucky	Houchens Industries–L. T. Smith Stadium; Bowling Green, KY		L 51–66	17,886
November 1	7:00 p.m.	at Vanderbilt*	Vanderbilt Stadium; Nashville, TN	ESPNU	L 28–42	28,966
November 8	3:30 p.m.	FIU^{†}	Foreman Field; Norfolk, VA	ASN	W 38–35	20,118
November 22	1:00 p.m.	Louisiana Tech	Foreman Field; Norfolk, VA (Oyster Bowl)	FCS	W 30–27 ^{OT}	20,118
November 29	12:00 p.m.	at Florida Atlantic	FAU Stadium; Boca Raton, FL	ASN	W 31–28	9,566
*Non-conference game; ^{†}Homecoming; All times are in Eastern time

Schedule source:

== Game summaries ==
=== Hampton ===
	1	2	3	4	Total
Pirates	0	14	7	7	28
Monarchs	7	21	13	0	41

=== NC State ===
	1	2	3	4	Total
Monarchs	14	7	7	6	34
Wolfpack	10	8	14	14	46

=== Eastern Michigan ===
	1	2	3	4	Total
Eagles	0	0	0	3	3
Monarchs	7	0	3	7	17

=== Rice ===
	1	2	3	4	Total
Monarchs	14	14	7	10	45
Owls	7	7	14	14	42

=== Middle Tennessee ===
	1	2	3	4	Total
Blue Raiders	0	24	7	10	41
Monarchs	0	7	14	7	28

=== Marshall ===
	1	2	3	4	Total
Thundering Herd	28	14	14	0	56
Monarchs	7	0	0	7	14

=== UTEP ===
	1	2	3	4	Total
Monarchs	7	0	21	7	35
Miners	7	14	7	14	42

=== Western Kentucky ===
	1	2	3	4	Total
Monarchs	3	27	21	0	51
Hilltoppers	21	21	14	10	66

=== Vanderbilt ===
	1	2	3	4	Total
Monarchs	7	7	7	7	28
Commodores	7	21	0	14	42

=== FIU ===
	1	2	3	4	Total
Panthers	7	3	17	8	35
Monarchs	7	14	7	10	38

=== Louisiana Tech ===
	1	2	3	4	OT	Total
Bulldogs	7	17	0	0	3	27
Monarchs	0	14	3	7	6	30

=== Florida Atlantic ===
	1	2	3	4	Total
Monarchs	7	14	0	10	31
Owls	14	7	0	7	28
