= 2014 North Texas Mean Green football team =

American college football season

2014 North Texas Mean Green football
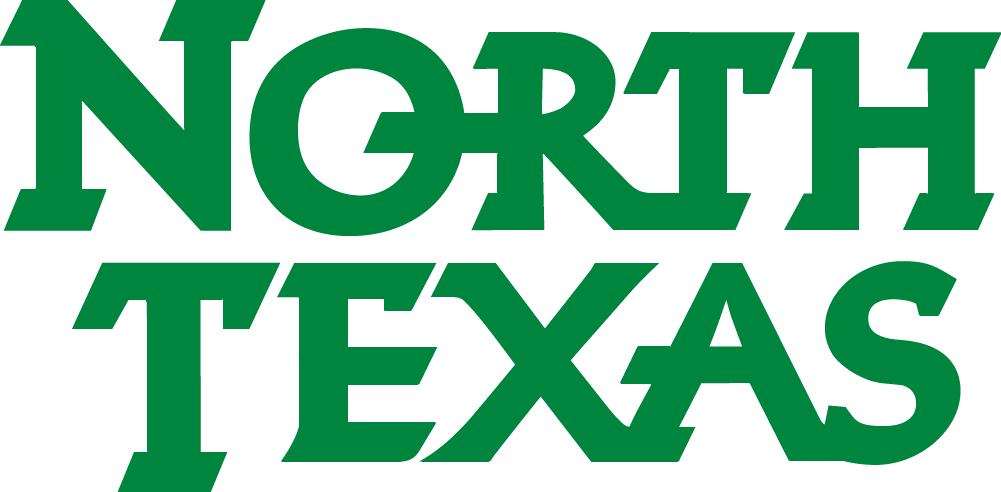
- Conference: Conference USA
- West Division
- Record: 4–8 (2–6 C-USA)
- Head coach: Dan McCarney (4th season)
- Offensive coordinator: Mike Canales (5th season)
- Offensive scheme: Pro-style
- Defensive coordinator: John Skladany (3rd season)
- Base defense: 4–3
- Home stadium: Apogee Stadium

2014 Conference USA football standings
	Conf.			Overall
Team	W		L	W		L
East Division
No. 23 Marshall x$	7	–	1	13	–	1
Middle Tennessee	5	–	3	6	–	6
Western Kentucky	4	–	4	8	–	5
UAB	4	–	4	6	–	6
Old Dominion*	4	–	4	6	–	6
FIU	3	–	5	4	–	8
Florida Atlantic	2	–	6	3	–	9
West Division
Louisiana Tech x	7	–	1	9	–	5
Rice	5	–	3	8	–	5
UTEP	5	–	3	7	–	6
UTSA	3	–	5	4	–	8
North Texas	2	–	6	4	–	8
Southern Miss	1	–	7	3	–	9
Championship: Marshall 26, Louisiana Tech 23
$ – Conference champion; x – Division champion/co-champions; * Ineligible for postseason bowl due to transition from FCS; As of 22:24, 20 December 2014 (UTC); Rankings from AP Poll

The 2014 North Texas Mean Green football team represented the University of North Texas as a member of Conference USA (C-USA) during the 2014 NCAA Division I FBS football season. Led by fourth-year head coach Dan McCarney, the Mean Green compiled an overall record of 4–8 with a mark 2–6 in conference play, placing fifth in C-USA's West Division. The team played home games at Apogee Stadium in Denton, Texas.

== Schedule ==
Date	Time	Opponent	Site	TV	Result	Attendance
August 30	7:00 pm	at Texas*	Darrell K Royal–Texas Memorial Stadium; Austin, TX	LHN	L 7–38	93,201
September 6	11:00 am	SMU*	Apogee Stadium; Denton, TX (Safeway Bowl)	FSN	W 43–6	22,398
September 11	7:00 pm	Louisiana Tech	Apogee Stadium; Denton, TX	CBSSN	L 21–42	16,998
September 20	7:00 pm	Nicholls State*	Apogee Stadium; Denton, TX	ASN	W 77–3	21,323
October 4	1:30 pm	at Indiana*	Memorial Stadium; Bloomington, IN	BTN	L 24–49	40,457
October 11	2:30 pm	at UAB	Legion Field; Birmingham, AL	ASN	L 21–56	20,365
October 18	7:00 pm	Southern Miss	Apogee Stadium; Denton, TX	ASN	L 20–30	19,127
October 25	11:00 am	at Rice	Rice Stadium; Houston, TX	FSN	L 21–41	18,430
November 8	6:00 pm	Florida Atlantic^{†}	Apogee Stadium; Denton, TX	FCS	W 31–10	20,957
November 15	9:00 pm	at UTEP	Sun Bowl; El Paso, TX	FS1	L 17–35	24,222
November 22	2:30 pm	FIU	Apogee Stadium; Denton, TX	ASN	W 17–14	14,824
November 29	11:00 am	at UTSA	Alamodome; San Antonio, TX	FSN	L 27–34	24,012
*Non-conference game; ^{†}Homecoming; All times are in Central time

== Game summaries ==
=== Texas ===
North Texas at Texas

Team	1	2	3	4	Total
Mean Green	0	0	0	7	7
• Longhorns	7	14	7	10	38

- Date: August 30
- Location: Darrell K Royal–Texas Memorial Stadium
  Austin, TX
- Game start: 7:05 p.m. CST
- Elapsed time: 3:11
- Game attendance: 93,201
- Game weather: 72 °F (22 °C), Sunny, winds NE at 8mph
- Referee: Randy Christal
- TV announcers (LHN): Kevin Dunn, Ahmad Brooks, & Sam Adams

Scoring summary
1	4:06	UT	Malcolm Brown 1-yard rush, Nick Rose kick good	UT 7–0
2	9:13	UT	Malcolm Brown 3-yard rush, Nick Rose kick good	UT 14–0
2	2:41	UT	David Ash 1-yard rush, Nick Rose kick good	UT 21–0
3	10:35	UT	John Harris 8-yard pass from David Ash, Nick Rose kick good	UT 28–0
4	7:17	NT	James Jones fumble recovery in the end zone for a touchdown, Trevor Moore kick good	UT 28–7
4	4:21	UT	Nick rose 34-yard field goal	UT 31–7
4	3:32	UT	Demarco Cobbs 28-yard interception return, Nick Rose kick good	UT 38–7

=== SMU ===
	1	2	3	4	Total
Mustangs	0	0	0	6	6
Mean Green	3	20	6	14	43

=== Louisiana Tech ===
	1	2	3	4	Total
Bulldogs	0	21	14	7	42
Mean Green	0	0	7	14	21

=== Nicholls State ===
	1	2	3	4	Total
Colonels	3	0	0	0	3
Mean Green	21	28	21	7	77

=== Indiana ===
	1	2	3	4	Total
Mean Green	0	7	3	14	24
Hoosiers	21	0	21	7	49

=== UAB ===
	1	2	3	4	Total
Mean Green	0	14	0	7	21
Blazers	14	21	21	0	56

=== Southern Miss ===
	1	2	3	4	Total
Golden Eagles	10	3	14	3	30
Mean Green	0	13	7	0	20

=== Rice ===
	1	2	3	4	Total
Mean Green	14	7	0	0	21
Owls	14	0	10	17	41

=== Florida Atlantic ===
	1	2	3	4	Total
Owls	3	0	7	0	10
Mean Green	7	14	0	10	31

=== UTEP ===
	1	2	3	4	Total
Mean Green	0	0	3	14	17
Miners	14	14	7	0	35

=== FIU ===
	1	2	3	4	Total
Panthers	7	7	0	0	14
Mean Green	14	0	3	0	17

=== UTSA ===
	1	2	3	4	Total
Mean Green	3	9	7	8	27
Roadrunners	7	13	7	7	34
