= 2014 Florida Atlantic Owls football team =

American college football season

2014 Florida Atlantic Owls football
- Conference: Conference USA
- East Division
- Record: 3–9 (2–6 C-USA)
- Head coach: Charlie Partridge (1st season)
- Offensive coordinator: Brian Wright (3rd season)
- Offensive scheme: Spread
- Defensive coordinator: Roc Bellantoni (1st season)
- Base defense: 4–3
- Home stadium: FAU Stadium

2014 Conference USA football standings
	Conf.			Overall
Team	W		L	W		L
East Division
No. 23 Marshall x$	7	–	1	13	–	1
Middle Tennessee	5	–	3	6	–	6
Western Kentucky	4	–	4	8	–	5
UAB	4	–	4	6	–	6
Old Dominion*	4	–	4	6	–	6
FIU	3	–	5	4	–	8
Florida Atlantic	2	–	6	3	–	9
West Division
Louisiana Tech x	7	–	1	9	–	5
Rice	5	–	3	8	–	5
UTEP	5	–	3	7	–	6
UTSA	3	–	5	4	–	8
North Texas	2	–	6	4	–	8
Southern Miss	1	–	7	3	–	9
Championship: Marshall 26, Louisiana Tech 23
$ – Conference champion; x – Division champion/co-champions; * Ineligible for postseason bowl due to transition from FCS; As of 22:24, 20 December 2014 (UTC); Rankings from AP Poll

The 2014 Florida Atlantic Owls football team represented Florida Atlantic University in the 2014 NCAA Division I FBS football season. They were led by first-year head coach Charlie Partridge and played their home games at FAU Stadium. They entered their second season as a member of Conference USA, competing in the East Division. They finished the season 3–9, 2–6 in C-USA play to finish in last place in the East Division.

== Schedule ==
Date	Time	Opponent	Site	TV	Result	Attendance
August 30	3:30 p.m.	at No. 22 Nebraska*	Memorial Stadium; Lincoln, NE	BTN	L 7–55	91,441
September 6	12:00 p.m.	at No. 2 Alabama*	Bryant–Denny Stadium; Tuscaloosa, AL	SECN	L 0–41	100,306
September 13	7:00 p.m.	Tulsa*	FAU Stadium; Boca Raton, FL	FCS	W 50–21	14,112
September 20	4:00 p.m.	at Wyoming*	War Memorial Stadium; Laramie, WY	MWN	L 19–20	21,226
September 27	5:00 p.m.	UTSA	FAU Stadium; Boca Raton, FL		W 41–37	13,928
October 2	7:00 p.m.	at FIU	FIU Stadium; Miami, FL (Shula Bowl)	FSN	L 10–38	12,544
October 18	12:00 p.m.	Western Kentucky	FAU Stadium; Boca Raton, FL	ASN	W 45–38	10,915
October 25	3:30 p.m.	at No. 23 Marshall	Joan C. Edwards Stadium; Huntington, WV	FS1	L 16–35	27,236
November 1	7:00 p.m.	UAB^{†}	FAU Stadium; Boca Raton, FL	ASN	L 28–31	17,724
November 8	7:00 p.m.	at North Texas	Apogee Stadium; Denton, TX	FCS	L 10–31	20,957
November 22	7:00 p.m.	at Middle Tennessee	Johnny "Red" Floyd Stadium; Murfreesboro, TN	ASN	L 34–35	12,243
November 29	12:00 p.m.	Old Dominion	FAU Stadium; Boca Raton, FL	ASN	L 28–31	9,566
*Non-conference game; ^{†}Homecoming; Rankings from AP Poll released prior to game; All times are in Eastern time

Schedule source:

== Game summaries ==
=== Nebraska ===
	1	2	3	4	Total
Owls	7	0	0	0	7
#22 Cornhuskers	14	17	17	7	55

=== Alabama ===
	1	2	3	4	Total
Owls	0	0	0	0	0
#2 Crimson Tide	21	10	7	3	41

With 7:53 to play in the fourth quarter, officials delayed the game due to lightning strikes within ten miles of Bryant–Denny Stadium. Both schools subsequently agreed to call the game, and this resulted in the 41–0 Alabama victory.

=== Tulsa ===
	1	2	3	4	Total
Golden Hurricane	0	7	7	7	21
Owls	17	16	10	7	50

=== Wyoming ===
	1	2	3	4	Total
Owls	3	3	10	3	19
Cowboys	7	3	0	10	20

=== UTSA ===
	1	2	3	4	Total
Roadrunners	10	14	7	6	37
Owls	7	13	7	14	41

=== FIU ===
	1	2	3	4	Total
Owls	3	7	0	0	10
Panthers	7	7	10	14	38

=== Western Kentucky ===
	1	2	3	4	Total
Hilltoppers	17	14	7	0	38
Owls	7	7	14	17	45

=== Marshall ===
	1	2	3	4	Total
Owls	3	13	0	0	16
#23 Thundering Herd	7	7	7	14	35

=== UAB ===
	1	2	3	4	Total
Blazers	7	14	7	3	31
Owls	0	7	0	21	28

=== North Texas ===
	1	2	3	4	Total
Owls	3	0	7	0	10
Mean Green	7	14	0	10	31

=== Middle Tennessee ===
	1	2	3	4	Total
Owls	17	0	10	7	34
Blue Raiders	7	7	7	14	35

=== Old Dominion ===
	1	2	3	4	Total
Monarchs	7	14	0	10	31
Owls	14	7	0	7	28
