= 2014 UTSA Roadrunners football team =

American college football season

2014 UTSA Roadrunners football
- Conference: Conference USA
- West Division
- Record: 4–8 (3–5 C-USA)
- Head coach: Larry Coker (4th season)
- Offensive coordinator: Kevin Brown (3rd season)
- Offensive scheme: Spread
- Defensive coordinator: Neal Neathery (4th season)
- Base defense: 4–2–5
- Home stadium: Alamodome

2014 Conference USA football standings
| | Conf. | | | Overall |
| Team | W | | L | W | | L |
|---|---|---|---|---|---|---|
East Division
| No. 23 Marshall x$ | 7 | – | 1 | 13 | – | 1 |
| Middle Tennessee | 5 | – | 3 | 6 | – | 6 |
| Western Kentucky | 4 | – | 4 | 8 | – | 5 |
| UAB | 4 | – | 4 | 6 | – | 6 |
| Old Dominion* | 4 | – | 4 | 6 | – | 6 |
| FIU | 3 | – | 5 | 4 | – | 8 |
| Florida Atlantic | 2 | – | 6 | 3 | – | 9 |
West Division
| Louisiana Tech x | 7 | – | 1 | 9 | – | 5 |
| Rice | 5 | – | 3 | 8 | – | 5 |
| UTEP | 5 | – | 3 | 7 | – | 6 |
| UTSA | 3 | – | 5 | 4 | – | 8 |
| North Texas | 2 | – | 6 | 4 | – | 8 |
| Southern Miss | 1 | – | 7 | 3 | – | 9 |
Championship: Marshall 26, Louisiana Tech 23
$ – Conference champion; x – Division champion/co-champions; * Ineligible for postseason bowl due to transition from FCS; As of 22:24, 20 December 2014 (UTC); Rankings from AP Poll

The 2014 UTSA Roadrunners football team represented the University of Texas at San Antonio in the 2014 NCAA Division I FBS football season. This was the fourth season for football at UTSA and their second as members of Conference USA in the West Division. Larry Coker returned as the team's head coach for a fourth season. The Roadrunners played their home games at the Alamodome. They finished the season 4–8, 3–5 in C-USA play to finish in fourth place in the West Division.

== Personnel ==
=== Coaching staff ===
| Name | Position | Seasons at UTSA | Alma mater |
|---|---|---|---|
| Larry Coker | Head coach | 4 | Northeastern State University (1970) |
| Kevin Brown | Offensive coordinator/quarterbacks | 3 | Texas Christian University (2006) |
| Polo Gutierrez | Running backs | 4 | New Mexico State University (2009) |
| Tony Jeffery | Wide receivers | 4 | University of Texas (2007) |
| Jeff Popovich | Cornerbacks | 1 | University of Miami (2000) |
| Eric Roark | Defensive line | 4 | Southeastern Oklahoma State University (1984) |
| Perry Eliano | Safeties/Special teams coordinator | 4 | Stephen F. Austin State University (2000) |
| Jim Marshall | Offensive line | 4 | University of Tennessee at Martin (1971) |
| Neal Neathery | Defensive coordinator/linebackers | 4 | Wheaton College (1993) |
| Charlie Reeve | Tight ends | 3 | Texas State University (2004) |

== Schedule ==
| Date | Time | Opponent | Site | TV | Result | Attendance |
|---|---|---|---|---|---|---|
| August 29 | 8:00 p.m. | at Houston* | TDECU Stadium; Houston, TX | ESPNU | W 27–7 | 40,755 |
| September 4 | 7:00 p.m. | Arizona* | Alamodome; San Antonio, TX | FS1 | L 23–26 | 33,472 |
| September 13 | 6:00 p.m. | at Oklahoma State* | Boone Pickens Stadium; Stillwater, OK | FSSW | L 13–43 | 54,577 |
| September 27 | 4:00 p.m. | at Florida Atlantic | FAU Stadium; Boca Raton, FL | KMYS | L 37–41 | 13,928 |
| October 4 | 2:30 p.m. | New Mexico* | Alamodome; San Antonio, TX | ASN on KMYS | L 9–21 | 30,419 |
| October 11 | 6:00 p.m. | FIU^{†} | Alamodome; San Antonio, TX | FCS | W 16–13 | 25,318 |
| October 18 | 11:00 a.m. | at Louisiana Tech | Joe Aillet Stadium; Ruston, LA | FSN | L 20–27 | 18,071 |
| October 25 | 6:00 p.m. | UTEP | Alamodome; San Antonio, TX | ASN on KMYS | L 0–34 | 31,956 |
| November 8 | 11:00 a.m. | at Rice | Rice Stadium; Houston, TX | FSN | L 7–17 | 19,464 |
| November 13 | 7:00 p.m. | Southern Miss | Alamodome; San Antonio, TX | CBSSN | W 12–10 | 20,281 |
| November 22 | 11:00 a.m. | at Western Kentucky | Houchens Industries–L. T. Smith Stadium; Bowling Green, KY | FSN | L 7–45 | 12,518 |
| November 29 | 11:00 a.m. | North Texas | Alamodome; San Antonio, TX | FSN | W 34–27 | 24,012 |
*Non-conference game; ^{†}Homecoming; All times are in Central time

Schedule source:

== Roster ==
2014 UTSA Roadrunners football team roster
Players
Coaches
Offense

| Pos. | # | Name | Class |
|---|---|---|---|
| WR | 1 | Kam Jones | Sr |
| QB | 2 | Dalton Sturm | Fr |
| RB | 2 | Jarveon Williams | So |
| QB | 3 | Austin Robinson | Fr |
| QB | 4 | Blake Bogenschutz | Fr |
| WR | 5 | Brandon Armstrong | Sr |
| QB | 6 | Tucker Carter (C) | Sr |
| QB | 8 | Brady Lambert | Jr |
| WR | 8 | Kerry Thomas Jr. | Fr |
| WR | 9 | Marcellus Mack | Sr |
| WR | 10 | Greg Campbell Jr. | Fr |
| RB | 11 | David Glasco II (C) | Sr |
| WR | 12 | Earon Holmes | Sr |
| RB | 13 | Brian Vaughn | Jr |
| WR | 15 | Josiah Monroe | Sr |
| RB | 16 | Clay Tyrell | Fr |
| WR | 17 | Aron Taylor | So |
| WR | 18 | Kenny Harrison | Sr |
| WR | 19 | Sean Hesler | Jr |
| WR | 20 | Larry Stephans | Fr |
| TE | 23 | Triston Crossland | Fr |
| RB | 27 | Nate Shaw (C) | Sr |
| RB | 28 | Jalen Rhodes | Fr |
| RB | 36 | Jerod Vick | Fr |
| RB | 40 | Blake Dean | Jr |
| RB | 44 | Treston Coleman | So |
| TE | 46 | Cade Laufer | Jr |
| G | 51 | Payton Rion | Sr |
| C | 55 | Nate Leonard | Sr |
| C | 59 | T.J. Talashek | So |
| C | 60 | Juan Perez | Sr |
| C | 62 | Breyun Owens | So |
| C | 63 | Will Cavanaugh | Jr |
| G | 65 | Michael Roberson | Jr |
| OT | 66 | Zach Hester | Jr |
| G | 67 | Kyle McKinney | Fr |
| OT | 68 | Cody Harris (C) | Sr |
| C | 69 | Brent Swanson | So |
| OT | 70 | Jordan Gray | Jr |
| G | 71 | Cody Cole | So |
| OT | 73 | David Anzaldua | Fr |
| OT | 74 | Reed Darragh | Fr |
| OT | 76 | Josh Walker | Sr |
| OT | 77 | Alex Delgado | So |
| G | 79 | Scott Inskeep | Sr |
| TE | 80 | Cameron Oliver | Fr |
| WR | 81 | Kenny Bias | Jr |
| TE | 82 | David Morgan II | Jr |
| TE | 83 | Cole Hubble (C) | Sr |
| WR | 84 | Brandon Freeman | Sr |
| WR | 85 | Brady Jones | Fr |
| WR | 86 | Seth Grubb | Sr |
| TE | 87 | Trevor Stevens | So |
| WR | 88 | Aaron Grubb | Jr |
| WR | 89 | Miles Lerch | So |

Defense

| Pos. | # | Name | Class |
|---|---|---|---|
| CB | 3 | Stanley Dye Jr. | Fr |
| CB | 4 | Crosby Adams III | Sr |
| CB | 6 | Aneas Henricks | Fr |
| S | 7 | Triston Wade | Sr |
| S | 10 | Brain King | Sr |
| S | 11 | Nate Gaines | Fr |
| S | 12 | Austin Gupe | Fr |
| S | 14 | Bailey N'Keal | Fr |
| CB | 16 | Fred Blow Jr. | So |
| CB | 20 | Andre Brown | Sr |
| CB | 21 | Bennett Okotcha | Jr |
| S | 22 | Nic Johnston | Sr |
| S | 23 | Tevin Broussard | Sr |
| CB | 24 | Darrien Starling | Sr |
| S | 25 | Mauricio Sanchez (C) | Jr |
| CB | 26 | Trevor Baker | Jr |
| S | 29 | Ragan Robichaux | Jr |
| S | 30 | Justin Chavez | Fr |
| S | 31 | Joseph Lizcano | Sr |
| LB | 32 | Drew Douglas | Jr |
| S | 33 | Chase Dahlquist | So |
| LB | 34 | Tank O'Neal | Fr |
| LB | 35 | Justin Todd | Fr |
| S | 37 | Duke Wheeler | Jr |
| LB | 41 | Credric Haley | So |
| LB | 42 | Jens Jeters | Sr |
| DE | 43 | Cody Rogers (C) | Sr |
| DE | 45 | Justyn Eddins | Jr |
| S | 48 | Gage Hadlock | So |
| DE | 50 | Robert Singletary | Sr |
| LB | 52 | Blake Terry | Sr |
| LB | 53 | Marcos Curry | So |
| DT | 54 | Kevin Strong Jr. | Fr |
| LB | 56 | Dalton Miler | So |
| DT | 58 | Ferrington Macon | Sr |
| DT | 61 | Richard Burge (C) | Sr |
| DT | 75 | Anthony Lee Jr. | Fr |
| DT | 90 | Kennedy Ubabuike | Jr |
| DT | 91 | Brian Price | Jr |
| DE | 93 | Marcus Davenport | Fr |
| DE | 94 | Codie Brooks | So |
| DT | 96 | Jason Neill | Sr |
| DT | 97 | Ashaad Mabry (C) | Sr |
| DT | 99 | John Paul Davila | Fr |

Special teams

| Pos. | # | Name | Class |
|---|---|---|---|
| PK, P | 13 | Daniel Portillo | Fr |
| P, PK | 38 | Kristian Stern | Sr |
| PK, P | 39 | Yannis Routsas | Fr |
| PK, P | 47 | Josh Ward | Sr |
| DS | 49 | Matt Bayliss | Fr |
| DS | 57 | Drew Johnson | So |
| PK | 92 | Sean Ianno | Sr |
| DS | 95 | Jesse Medrano | Sr |

Head coach

- Larry Coker

Coordinators/assistant coaches

- Kevin Brown
  Offensive coordinator/quarterbacks
- Perry Eliano
  Special teams coordinator/safeties
- Polo Gutierrez
  Runningbacks
- Jim Marshall
  Offensive linemen
- Marquis Mosely
  Receivers
- Neal Neathery
  Defensive coordinator/linebackers
- Jeff Popovich
  Cornerbacks
- Charlie Reeve
  Tight ends
- Eric Roark
  Defensive linemen

Legend

- (C) Team captain
- (S) Suspended
- (I) Ineligible
- Injured
- Redshirt

Roster
Last update: August 30, 2014

== Depth chart ==
Defense

DAWG
Nic Johnston
Chase Dahlquist

FS
Triston Wade
Tevin Broussard

| WLB | SLB |
|---|---|
| ⋅ | ⋅ |
| ⋅ | ⋅ |

ROVER
Mauricio Sanchez
Brian King

CB
Crosby Adams III
Andre Brown

| DE | DT | DT | DE |
|---|---|---|---|
| Cody Rogers | Ferrington Macon | Ashaad Mabry | Robert Singletary |
| Jason Neill | Richard Burge | Brian Price | Codie Brooks |

CB
Bennett Okotcha
Darrien Starling

Offense

WR
Earon Holmes
Miles Lerch

WR
Kam Jones
Aaron Grubb

| LT | LG | C | RG | RT |
|---|---|---|---|---|
| Cody Harris | Scott Inskeep | Nate Leonard | William Cavanaugh | Jordan Gray |
| Michael Roberson | Kyle McKinney | Juan Perez | Payton Rion | Reed Darragh |

TE
David Morgan II
Cole Hubble

WR
Marcellus Mark
Kenny Harrison

QB
Tucker Carter
Austin Robinson

Key reserves
Blake Dean (FB)
Jarveon Williams (TB)
Matt Bayliss (LS)
Justin Chavez (S)
Kerry Thomas Jr. (WR)

RB
David Glasco II
Nate Shaw

Special teams
PK Sean Ianno
PK Daniel Portillo
P Kristian Stern
KR Jarveon Williams
PR Kenny Harrison
LS Jesse Medrano
H Seth Grubb

== Game summaries ==
=== Houston ===
UTSA at Houston

| Team | 1 | 2 | 3 | 4 | Total |
|---|---|---|---|---|---|
| • Roadrunners | 7 | 7 | 10 | 3 | 27 |
| Cougars | 0 | 0 | 0 | 7 | 7 |

- Date: August 30
- Location: TDECU Stadium
  Houston, TX
- Game start: 8:03 p.m. CDT
- Elapsed time: 3:19
- Game attendance: 40,755
- Game weather: 79 °F (26 °C), Cloudy, winds S at 18mph
- Referee: Rodney Burnette
- TV announcers (ESPNU): Mike Couzens and Charles Arbuckle

Scoring summary
| 1 | 06:50 | UTSA | David Glasco II 3-yard run, Sean Ianno kick good | UTSA 7–0 |
| 2 | 00:42 | UTSA | David Glasco II 2-yard run, Sean Ianno kick good | UTSA 14–0 |
| 3 | 8:07 | UTSA | Jarveon Williams 11-yard run, Sean Ianno kick good | UTSA 21–0 |
| 3 | 01:15 | UTSA | Sean Ianno 26-yard field goal | UTSA 24-0 |
| 4 | 04:04 | UTSA | Sean Ianno 30-yard field goal | UTSA 27-0 |
| 4 | 3:00 | UH | Ryan Jackson 2-yard run, Kyle Bullard kick good | UTSA 27-7 |

=== Arizona ===
Arizona at UTSA

| Team | 1 | 2 | 3 | 4 | Total |
|---|---|---|---|---|---|
| • Wildcats | 10 | 10 | 6 | 0 | 26 |
| Roadrunners | 7 | 9 | 0 | 7 | 23 |

- Date: September 4
- Location: Alamodome
  San Antonio, TX
- Game start: 7:06 p.m. CDT
- Elapsed time: 3:18
- Game attendance: 33,472
- Game weather: 72 °F (22 °C), Indoors
- Referee: Steve Barth
- TV announcers (FS1): Tim Brando and Joel Klatt

Scoring summary
| 1 | 14:42 | ARIZ | Cayleb Jones 85-yard pass from Anu Solomon, Casey Skowron kick good | ARIZ 7–0 |
| 1 | 11:05 | ARIZ | Casey Skowron 38-yard field goal | ARIZ 10–0 |
| 1 | 0:55 | UTSA | David Morgan II 10-yard pass from Tucker Carter, Sean Ianno kick good | ARIZ 10–7 |
| 2 | 12:11 | ARIZ | Casey Skowron 23-yard field goal | ARIZ 13-7 |
| 2 | 8:47 | UTSA | Kam Jones 18-yard run, Sean Ianno kick good | UTSA 14-13 |
| 2 | 4:43 | UTSA | Team Safety | UTSA 16-13 |
| 2 | 0:26 | ARIZ | Nick Wilson 2-yard run, Skowron kick good | ARIZ 20-16 |
| 3 | 8:31 | ARIZ | Casey Skowron 44-yard field goal | ARIZ 23-16 |
| 3 | 4:12 | ARIZ | Casey Skowron 28-yard field goal | ARIZ 26-16 |
| 4 | 7:32 | UTSA | Davis Glasco II 3-yard run, Sean Ianno kick good | ARIZ 26-23 |

=== Oklahoma State ===
UTSA at Oklahoma State

| Team | 1 | 2 | 3 | 4 | Total |
|---|---|---|---|---|---|
| Roadrunners | 3 | 0 | 7 | 3 | 13 |
| • Cowboys | 14 | 10 | 3 | 16 | 43 |

- Date: September 13
- Location: Boone Pickens Stadium
  Stillwater, OK
- Game start: 6:06 pm CDT
- Elapsed time: 3:15
- Game attendance: 54,577
- Game weather: 70 °F (21 °C), Cloudy, winds SE at 6mph
- Referee: Wayne Winkler
- TV announcers (FSSW): Mark Followill, Brian Baldinger, and Lesley McCaslin

=== Florida Atlantic ===
UTSA at Florida Atlantic

| Team | 1 | 2 | 3 | 4 | Total |
|---|---|---|---|---|---|
| Roadrunners | 10 | 14 | 7 | 6 | 37 |
| • Owls | 7 | 13 | 7 | 14 | 41 |

- Date: September 27
- Location: FAU Stadium
  Boca Raton, FL
- TV announcers (KMYS): Jay Howard, Don Harris, and Jim Goodman

=== New Mexico ===
| | 1 | 2 | 3 | 4 | Total |
|---|---|---|---|---|---|
| Lobos | 0 | 0 | 14 | 7 | 21 |
| Roadrunners | 0 | 3 | 6 | 0 | 9 |

=== FIU ===
| | 1 | 2 | 3 | 4 | Total |
|---|---|---|---|---|---|
| Panthers | 0 | 10 | 0 | 3 | 13 |
| Roadrunners | 0 | 7 | 3 | 6 | 16 |

=== Louisiana Tech ===
| | 1 | 2 | 3 | 4 | Total |
|---|---|---|---|---|---|
| Roadrunners | 3 | 7 | 0 | 10 | 20 |
| Bulldogs | 0 | 6 | 21 | 0 | 27 |

=== UTEP ===
| | 1 | 2 | 3 | 4 | Total |
|---|---|---|---|---|---|
| Miners | 14 | 3 | 10 | 7 | 34 |
| Roadrunners | 0 | 0 | 0 | 0 | 0 |

=== Rice ===
| | 1 | 2 | 3 | 4 | Total |
|---|---|---|---|---|---|
| Roadrunners | 0 | 0 | 0 | 7 | 7 |
| Owls | 7 | 3 | 7 | 0 | 17 |

=== Southern Miss ===
| | 1 | 2 | 3 | 4 | Total |
|---|---|---|---|---|---|
| Golden Eagles | 0 | 0 | 0 | 10 | 10 |
| Roadrunners | 0 | 6 | 3 | 3 | 12 |

=== Western Kentucky ===
| | 1 | 2 | 3 | 4 | Total |
|---|---|---|---|---|---|
| Roadrunners | 0 | 0 | 0 | 7 | 7 |
| Hilltoppers | 14 | 14 | 7 | 10 | 45 |

=== North Texas ===
| | 1 | 2 | 3 | 4 | Total |
|---|---|---|---|---|---|
| Mean Green | 3 | 9 | 7 | 8 | 27 |
| Roadrunners | 7 | 13 | 7 | 7 | 34 |
