= 2014 Middle Tennessee Blue Raiders football team =

American college football season

2014 Middle Tennessee Blue Raiders football
- Conference: Conference USA
- East Division
- Record: 6–6 (5–3 C-USA)
- Head coach: Rick Stockstill (9th season)
- Offensive coordinator: Buster Faulkner (3rd season)
- Offensive scheme: Pro spread
- Co-defensive coordinators: Steve Ellis (4th season); Tyrone Nix (3rd season)
- Base defense: 4–3
- Home stadium: Johnny "Red" Floyd Stadium

2014 Conference USA football standings
	Conf.			Overall
Team	W		L	W		L
East Division
No. 23 Marshall x$	7	–	1	13	–	1
Middle Tennessee	5	–	3	6	–	6
Western Kentucky	4	–	4	8	–	5
UAB	4	–	4	6	–	6
Old Dominion*	4	–	4	6	–	6
FIU	3	–	5	4	–	8
Florida Atlantic	2	–	6	3	–	9
West Division
Louisiana Tech x	7	–	1	9	–	5
Rice	5	–	3	8	–	5
UTEP	5	–	3	7	–	6
UTSA	3	–	5	4	–	8
North Texas	2	–	6	4	–	8
Southern Miss	1	–	7	3	–	9
Championship: Marshall 26, Louisiana Tech 23
$ – Conference champion; x – Division champion/co-champions; * Ineligible for postseason bowl due to transition from FCS; Rankings from AP Poll

The 2014 Middle Tennessee Blue Raiders football team represented Middle Tennessee State University as a member of the East Division of Conference USA (C-USA) during the 2014 NCAA Division I FBS football season. Led by ninth-year head coach Rick Stockstill, the Blue Raiders compiled an overall record of 6–6 with a mark of 5–3 in conference play, placing second in C-USA's East Division. Despite being bowl eligible, the team was not invited to a bowl game. Middle Tennessee played home games at Johnny "Red" Floyd Stadium in Murfreesboro, Tennessee.

== Schedule ==
Date	Time	Opponent	Site	TV	Result	Attendance
August 30	6:00 p.m.	Savannah State*	Johnny "Red" Floyd Stadium; Murfreesboro, TN		W 61–7	15,605
September 6	2:30 p.m.	at Minnesota*	TCF Bank Stadium; Minneapolis, MN	BTN	L 24–35	47,223
September 13	6:00 p.m.	Western Kentucky	Johnny "Red" Floyd Stadium; Murfreesboro, TN (100 Miles of Hate)	WUXP	W 50–47 ^{3OT}	24,911
September 20	6:00 pm	at Memphis*	Liberty Bowl Memorial Stadium; Memphis, TN	ESPN3	L 17–36	46,378
September 27	7:00 p.m.	at Old Dominion	Foreman Field; Norfolk, VA	FS1	W 41–28	20,118
October 4	11:00 a.m.	Southern Miss	Johnny "Red" Floyd Stadium; Murfreesboro, TN	ASN	W 37–31	14,022
October 11	11:00 a.m.	at Marshall	Joan C. Edwards Stadium; Huntington, WV	FSN	L 24–49	30,210
October 18	2:30 p.m.	UAB^{†}	Johnny "Red" Floyd Stadium; Murfreesboro, TN	FCS	W 34–22	18,717
November 1	2:30 p.m.	BYU*	Johnny "Red" Floyd Stadium; Murfreesboro, TN	CBSSN	L 7–27	18,952
November 15	2:30 p.m.	at FIU	FIU Stadium; Miami, FL	ASN	L 28–38	12,917
November 22	6:00 p.m.	Florida Atlantic	Johnny "Red" Floyd Stadium; Murfreesboro, TN	ASN	W 35–34	12,243
November 29	6:00 p.m.	at UTEP	Sun Bowl Stadium; El Paso, TX	ASN	L 21–24	27,455
*Non-conference game; ^{†}Homecoming; All times are in Central time

== Game summaries ==
=== Savannah State ===
	1	2	3	4	Total
Tigers	0	0	0	7	7
Blue Raiders	20	14	20	7	61

=== Minnesota ===
	1	2	3	4	Total
Blue Raiders	0	0	17	7	24
Golden Gophers	7	21	7	0	35

=== WKU ===
	1	2	3	4	OT	2OT	3OT	Total
Hilltoppers	3	21	0	10	7	3	3	47
Blue Raiders	14	10	0	10	7	3	6	50

=== Memphis ===
	1	2	3	4	Total
Blue Raiders	7	0	3	7	17
Tigers	9	10	3	14	36

=== Old Dominion ===
	1	2	3	4	Total
Blue Raiders	0	24	7	10	41
Monarchs	0	7	14	7	28

=== Southern Miss ===
	1	2	3	4	Total
Golden Eagles	3	9	0	19	31
Blue Raiders	10	14	0	13	37

=== Marshall ===
	1	2	3	4	Total
Blue Raiders	7	10	0	7	24
Thundering Herd	14	14	14	7	49

=== UAB ===
	1	2	3	4	Total
Blazers	6	9	7	0	22
Blue Raiders	14	7	0	13	34

=== BYU ===
	1	2	3	4	Total
Cougars	7	0	14	6	27
Blue Raiders	0	7	0	0	7

=== FIU ===
	1	2	3	4	Total
Blue Raiders	14	7	7	0	28
Panthers	3	14	21	0	38

=== Florida Atlantic ===
	1	2	3	4	Total
Owls	17	0	10	7	34
Blue Raiders	7	7	7	14	35

=== UTEP ===
	1	2	3	4	Total
Blue Raiders	7	7	0	7	21
Miners	3	7	7	7	24
