= 2014 Southern Miss Golden Eagles football team =

American college football season

2014 Southern Miss Golden Eagles football
- Conference: Conference USA
- West Division
- Record: 3–9 (1–7 C-USA)
- Head coach: Todd Monken (2nd season)
- Offensive coordinator: Chip Lindsey (1st season)
- Offensive scheme: Multiple
- Defensive coordinator: David Duggan (3rd season)
- Base defense: 4–3
- Home stadium: M. M. Roberts Stadium

2014 Conference USA football standings
| | Conf. | | | Overall |
| Team | W | | L | W | | L |
|---|---|---|---|---|---|---|
East Division
| No. 23 Marshall x$ | 7 | – | 1 | 13 | – | 1 |
| Middle Tennessee | 5 | – | 3 | 6 | – | 6 |
| Western Kentucky | 4 | – | 4 | 8 | – | 5 |
| UAB | 4 | – | 4 | 6 | – | 6 |
| Old Dominion* | 4 | – | 4 | 6 | – | 6 |
| FIU | 3 | – | 5 | 4 | – | 8 |
| Florida Atlantic | 2 | – | 6 | 3 | – | 9 |
West Division
| Louisiana Tech x | 7 | – | 1 | 9 | – | 5 |
| Rice | 5 | – | 3 | 8 | – | 5 |
| UTEP | 5 | – | 3 | 7 | – | 6 |
| UTSA | 3 | – | 5 | 4 | – | 8 |
| North Texas | 2 | – | 6 | 4 | – | 8 |
| Southern Miss | 1 | – | 7 | 3 | – | 9 |
Championship: Marshall 26, Louisiana Tech 23
$ – Conference champion; x – Division champion/co-champions; * Ineligible for postseason bowl due to transition from FCS; As of 22:24, 20 December 2014 (UTC); Rankings from AP Poll

The 2014 Southern Miss Golden Eagles football team represented the University of Southern Mississippi in the 2014 NCAA Division I FBS football season as a new member of the West Division of Conference USA. They were led by second-year head coach Todd Monken and played their home games at M. M. Roberts Stadium in Hattiesburg, Mississippi. They finished the season 3–9, 1–7 in C-USA play to finish in last place in the West Division.

== Schedule ==
| Date | Time | Opponent | Site | TV | Result | Attendance |
|---|---|---|---|---|---|---|
| August 30 | 6:30 pm | at Mississippi State* | Davis Wade Stadium; Starkville, MS | SECN | L 0–49 | 61,889 |
| September 6 | 6:00 pm | Alcorn State* | M. M. Roberts Stadium; Hattiesburg, MS | | W 26–20 | 26,448 |
| September 13 | 5:00 pm | at No. 3 Alabama* | Bryant–Denny Stadium; Tuscaloosa, AL | ESPN2 | L 12–52 | 101,821 |
| September 20 | 6:00 pm | Appalachian State* | M. M. Roberts Stadium; Hattiesburg, MS | ASN | W 21–20 | 21,836 |
| September 27 | 6:00 pm | Rice | M. M. Roberts Stadium; Hattiesburg, MS | FCS | L 23–41 | 24,756 |
| October 4 | 11:00 am | at Middle Tennessee | Johnny "Red" Floyd Stadium; Murfreesboro, TN | ASN | L 31–37 | 14,022 |
| October 18 | 6:00 pm | at North Texas | Apogee Stadium; Denton, TX | ASN | W 30–20 | 19,127 |
| October 25 | 2:30 pm | Louisiana Tech | M. M. Roberts Stadium; Hattiesburg, MS (Rivalry in Dixie) | ASN | L 20–31 | 23,343 |
| November 1 | 7:00 pm | at UTEP | Sun Bowl; El Paso, TX | FCS | L 14–35 | 24,673 |
| November 8 | 6:00 pm | No. 23 Marshall^{†} | M. M. Roberts Stadium; Hattiesburg, MS | ASN | L 17–63 | 22,949 |
| November 13 | 7:00 pm | at UTSA | Alamodome; San Antonio, TX | CBSSN | L 10–12 | 20,281 |
| November 29 | 2:30 pm | UAB | M. M. Roberts Stadium; Hattiesburg, MS | ASN | L 24–45 | 17,103 |
*Non-conference game; ^{†}Homecoming; Rankings from AP Poll released prior to the game; All times are in Central time

Confirmed ASN stations in the Southern Miss broadcast area- WXXV and WPMI

== Game summaries ==
=== Mississippi State ===
| | 1 | 2 | 3 | 4 | Total |
|---|---|---|---|---|---|
| Golden Eagles | 0 | 0 | 0 | 0 | 0 |
| Bulldogs | 7 | 21 | 14 | 7 | 49 |

*Mississippi State won the games on the field in 1975 and 1976, but were later forced to forfeit the games by the NCAA due to an NCAA rules violation in which offensive lineman Larry Gillard received a 33 percent discount at an Okolona, Mississippi clothing store.

=== Alcorn State ===
| | 1 | 2 | 3 | 4 | Total |
|---|---|---|---|---|---|
| Braves | 0 | 7 | 0 | 13 | 20 |
| Golden Eagles | 3 | 17 | 3 | 3 | 26 |

=== Alabama ===
| | 1 | 2 | 3 | 4 | Total |
|---|---|---|---|---|---|
| Golden Eagles | 3 | 3 | 3 | 3 | 12 |
| #3 Crimson Tide | 7 | 14 | 14 | 17 | 52 |

=== Appalachian State ===
| | 1 | 2 | 3 | 4 | Total |
|---|---|---|---|---|---|
| Mountaineers | 0 | 7 | 0 | 13 | 20 |
| Golden Eagles | 7 | 7 | 0 | 7 | 21 |

=== Rice ===
| | 1 | 2 | 3 | 4 | Total |
|---|---|---|---|---|---|
| Owls | 3 | 17 | 7 | 14 | 41 |
| Golden Eagles | 0 | 10 | 6 | 7 | 23 |

=== Middle Tennessee ===
| | 1 | 2 | 3 | 4 | Total |
|---|---|---|---|---|---|
| Golden Eagles | 3 | 9 | 0 | 19 | 31 |
| Blue Raiders | 10 | 14 | 0 | 13 | 37 |

=== North Texas ===
| | 1 | 2 | 3 | 4 | Total |
|---|---|---|---|---|---|
| Golden Eagles | 10 | 3 | 14 | 3 | 30 |
| Mean Green | 0 | 13 | 7 | 0 | 20 |

=== Louisiana Tech ===
| | 1 | 2 | 3 | 4 | Total |
|---|---|---|---|---|---|
| Bulldogs | 0 | 3 | 14 | 14 | 31 |
| Golden Eagles | 7 | 0 | 3 | 10 | 20 |

=== UTEP ===
| | 1 | 2 | 3 | 4 | Total |
|---|---|---|---|---|---|
| Golden Eagles | 0 | 0 | 14 | 0 | 14 |
| Miners | 7 | 0 | 14 | 14 | 35 |

=== Marshall ===
| | 1 | 2 | 3 | 4 | Total |
|---|---|---|---|---|---|
| #23 Thundering Herd | 7 | 21 | 14 | 21 | 63 |
| Golden Eagles | 14 | 3 | 0 | 0 | 17 |

=== UTSA ===
| | 1 | 2 | 3 | 4 | Total |
|---|---|---|---|---|---|
| Golden Eagles | 0 | 0 | 0 | 10 | 10 |
| Roadrunners | 0 | 6 | 3 | 3 | 12 |

=== UAB ===
| | 1 | 2 | 3 | 4 | Total |
|---|---|---|---|---|---|
| Blazers | 14 | 7 | 14 | 10 | 45 |
| Golden Eagles | 0 | 7 | 10 | 7 | 24 |
