= 2014 UAB Blazers football team =

American college football season

2014 UAB Blazers football
- Conference: Conference USA
- East Division
- Record: 6–6 (4–4 C-USA)
- Head coach: Bill Clark (1st season)
- Offensive coordinator: Bryant Vincent (1st season)
- Offensive scheme: Spread option
- Defensive coordinator: Duwan Walker (1st season)
- Base defense: Multiple 4–2–5
- Home stadium: Legion Field

2014 Conference USA football standings
	Conf.			Overall
Team	W		L	W		L
East Division
No. 23 Marshall x$	7	–	1	13	–	1
Middle Tennessee	5	–	3	6	–	6
Western Kentucky	4	–	4	8	–	5
UAB	4	–	4	6	–	6
Old Dominion*	4	–	4	6	–	6
FIU	3	–	5	4	–	8
Florida Atlantic	2	–	6	3	–	9
West Division
Louisiana Tech x	7	–	1	9	–	5
Rice	5	–	3	8	–	5
UTEP	5	–	3	7	–	6
UTSA	3	–	5	4	–	8
North Texas	2	–	6	4	–	8
Southern Miss	1	–	7	3	–	9
Championship: Marshall 26, Louisiana Tech 23
$ – Conference champion; x – Division champion/co-champions; * Ineligible for postseason bowl due to transition from FCS; As of 22:24, 20 December 2014 (UTC); Rankings from AP Poll

The 2014 UAB Blazers football team represented the University of Alabama at Birmingham (UAB) as a member of the East Division in Conference USA (C-USA) during the 2014 NCAA Division I FBS football season. Led by first-year head coach Bill Clark, the Blazers compiled an overall record of 6–6 with a mark of 4–4 in conference play, placing in three-way tie for third in C-USA's East Division. The team played home games at Legion Field in Birmingham, Alabama.

After defeating Southern Miss in the final regular season game on November 29, 2014, UAB became bowl eligible for the first time since 2004. Three days later, UAB president Ray L. Watts announced that the Southern Miss victory would be the last for the program as the university would not field a football team after 2014. Despite the troubles following the year, the season itself was viewed as a success. The Blazers boasted one of the best special teams units in the country, led by special teams coordinator Daric Riley. Clark won the Conference USA Coach of the Year award. Nonetheless, they became the first NCAA Division I Football Bowl Subdivision (FBS) school to stop sponsoring football since the Pacific Tigers football was discontinued in 1995.

On June 1, 2015, Watts announced that UAB beginning the process to reinstate football, and the program was reinstated for the 2017 season.

== Schedule ==
Date	Time	Opponent	Site	TV	Result	Attendance
August 30	11:00 a.m.	Troy*	Legion Field; Birmingham, AL	FCS	W 48–10	27,133
September 6	1:00 p.m.	at Mississippi State*	Davis Wade Stadium; Starkville, MS	SECRN	L 34–47	57,704
September 13	2:30 p.m.	Alabama A&M*	Legion Field; Birmingham, AL	ASN	W 41–14	29,604
September 27	2:30 p.m.	FIU	Legion Field; Birmingham, AL	ASN	L 20–34	16,133
October 4	6:00 p.m.	at Western Kentucky	Houchens Industries–L. T. Smith Stadium; Bowling Green, KY		W 42–39	14,923
October 11	2:30 p.m.	North Texas	Legion Field; Birmingham, AL	ASN	W 56–21	20,365
October 18	2:30 p.m.	at Middle Tennessee	Johnny "Red" Floyd Stadium; Murfreesboro, TN	FCS	L 22–34	18,717
October 25	11:00 a.m.	at Arkansas*	Donald W. Reynolds Razorback Stadium; Fayetteville, AR	SECN	L 17–45	61,800
November 1	6:00 p.m.	at Florida Atlantic	FAU Stadium; Boca Raton, FL	ASN	W 31–28	17,724
November 8	11:00 a.m.	Louisiana Tech	Legion Field; Birmingham, AL	ASN	L 24–40	9,457
November 22	11:00 a.m.	No. 18 Marshall	Legion Field; Birmingham, AL	ASN	L 18–23	28,355
November 29	2:30 p.m.	at Southern Miss	M. M. Roberts Stadium; Hattiesburg, MS	ASN	W 45–24	17,103
*Non-conference game; Rankings from AP Poll released prior to the game; All times are in Central time

== Game summaries ==
=== Troy ===
	1	2	3	4	Total
Trojans	7	3	0	0	10
Blazers	17	7	14	10	48

=== Mississippi State ===
	1	2	3	4	Total
Blazers	3	17	7	7	34
Bulldogs	13	13	21	0	47

=== Alabama A&M ===
	1	2	3	4	Total
Bulldogs	7	7	0	0	14
Blazers	0	21	20	0	41

=== FIU ===
	1	2	3	4	Total
Panthers	0	14	10	10	34
Blazers	7	6	0	7	20

=== WKU ===
	1	2	3	4	Total
Blazers	14	0	21	7	42
Hilltoppers	20	7	12	0	39

=== North Texas ===
	1	2	3	4	Total
Mean Green	0	14	0	7	21
Blazers	14	21	21	0	56

=== Middle Tennessee ===
	1	2	3	4	Total
Blazers	6	9	7	0	22
Blue Raiders	14	7	0	13	34

=== Arkansas ===
	1	2	3	4	Total
Blazers	0	0	10	7	17
Razorbacks	14	21	10	0	45

=== Florida Atlantic ===
	1	2	3	4	Total
Blazers	7	14	7	3	31
Owls	0	7	0	21	28

=== Louisiana Tech ===
	1	2	3	4	Total
Bulldogs	14	10	6	10	40
Blazers	3	7	7	7	24

=== Marshall ===
	1	2	3	4	Total
#18 Thundering Herd	7	10	0	6	23
Blazers	3	3	6	6	18

=== Southern Miss ===
	1	2	3	4	Total
Blazers	14	7	14	10	45
Golden Eagles	0	7	10	7	24
