= 2014 Conference USA Football Championship Game =

- Conference Championship
Louisiana Tech Bulldogs	Marshall Thundering Herd
(8–4)	(11–1)
23	26
Head coach: Skip Holtz	Head coach: John "Doc" Holliday
	1	2	3	4	Total
Louisiana Tech	10	7	6	0	23
Marshall	0	13	3	10	26
- Date: December 6, 2014
- Season: 2014
- Stadium: Joan C. Edwards Stadium
- Location: Huntington, WV
- MVP: K Justin Haig (Marshall)
- Favorite: Marshall by 9
- Attendance: 23,711

United States TV coverage
- Network: ESPN2
- Announcers: Beth Mowins, Joey Galloway, and Paul Carcaterra

2014 Conference USA football standings
	Conf.			Overall
Team	W		L	W		L
East Division
No. 23 Marshall x$	7	–	1	13	–	1
Middle Tennessee	5	–	3	6	–	6
Western Kentucky	4	–	4	8	–	5
UAB	4	–	4	6	–	6
Old Dominion*	4	–	4	6	–	6
FIU	3	–	5	4	–	8
Florida Atlantic	2	–	6	3	–	9
West Division
Louisiana Tech x	7	–	1	9	–	5
Rice	5	–	3	8	–	5
UTEP	5	–	3	7	–	6
UTSA	3	–	5	4	–	8
North Texas	2	–	6	4	–	8
Southern Miss	1	–	7	3	–	9
Championship: Marshall 26, Louisiana Tech 23
$ – Conference champion; x – Division champion/co-champions; * Ineligible for postseason bowl due to transition from FCS; Rankings from AP Poll

The 2014 Conference USA Football Championship Game, held on December 6 of that year at Joan C. Edwards Stadium in Huntington, West Virginia, determined the 2014 football champion of Conference USA (C-USA), on December 6. The game featured the Marshall Thundering Herd, winners of the conference's East Division, hosting the West Division champion Louisiana Tech Bulldogs.

Under C-USA rules, the championship game would be played at the home stadium of the team with the best record in conference play.

== History ==
In the 2013 Championship Game Rice defeated Marshall, 41–24 in Houston, Texas.

After the 2014 Conference USA realignment, C-USA added two new members for the 2014 season after losing three members, including East Carolina, to the American Athletic Conference.

After the 2014 season, this was the tenth C-USA championship game, and was played in West Virginia for the first time.

== Teams ==
=== West Division Champions ===
Louisiana Tech entered the championship game with a record of 8–4 and went 6–0 in conference play until November 22, 2014, against newcomers Old Dominion Monarchs. The loss to the Monarchs brought Rice back to compete for the division title. Louisiana Tech defeated Rice in their last regular season game, which brought the Bulldogs to their first conference championship game in program history.

=== East Division Champions ===
Marshall entered the championship game with a record of 11–1 after winning all non-conference games and all of their conference games except for conference foe Western Kentucky. Marshall trailed Middle Tennessee in the East Division standings, until they faced on October 11, 2014. Marshall defeated the Blue Raiders 49–24, moving the Thundering Herd to the top of the division. Marshall continued to storm through the rest of their schedule and was crowned East Division Champs after defeating defending champions, Rice on November 15, 2014, in Huntington.

This was Marshall's second appearance in the Conference USA Championship series in back–to–back years. Marshall hosted the championship game in Huntington, WV on December 6, 2014, marking the first time the Conference USA Championship was played in Huntington.

== Scoring summary ==
Quarter	Time	Drive		Team	Scoring Information	Score	
Quarter	Time	Length	Time	Team	Scoring Information	LaTech	Marshall
1	7:54	11 plays, 58 yards	5:29	LaTech	Jonathan Barnes 26–yard kick good	3	0
1	2:53	1 play, 33 yards	0:07	LaTech	Kenneth Dixon 33–yard rush, Jonathan Barnes kick good	10	0
2	14:57	7 plays, 75 yards	2:56	Marshall	Deon-Tay McManus 6–yard reception from Rakeem Cato, Justin Haig kick good	10	7
2	7:41	4 plays, 40 yards	0:52	LaTech	Kenneth Dixon 30–yard rush, Jonathan Barnes kick good	17	7
2	3:52	5 plays, 11 yards	0:35	Marshall	Justin Haig 40–yard kick good	17	10
2	0:00	3 plays, 40 yards	0:19	Marshall	Justin Haig 46–yard kick good	17	13
3	10:26	10 plays, 42 yards	2:58	Marshall	Justin Haig 40–yard kick good	17	16
3	0:18	1 play, 19 yards	0:09	LaTech	Kenneth Dixon 19–yard rush, Jonathan Barnes kick failed	23	16
4	8:34	5 plays, 25 yards	1:34	Marshall	Justin Haig 24–yard kick good	23	19
4	1:50	11 plays, 68 yards	3:11	Marshall	Deon-Tay McManus 5–yard reception from Rakeem Cato, Justin Haig kick good	23	26
Final Score						23	26
