= 2014 FIU Panthers football team =

American college football season

2014 FIU Panthers football
- Conference: Conference USA
- East Division
- Record: 4–8 (3–5 C-USA)
- Head coach: Ron Turner (2nd season)
- Offensive coordinator: Steve Shankweiler (1st season)
- Offensive scheme: Pro set
- Defensive coordinator: Josh Conklin (2nd season)
- Base defense: Multiple 4–3
- Home stadium: FIU Stadium

2014 Conference USA football standings
	Conf.			Overall
Team	W		L	W		L
East Division
No. 23 Marshall x$	7	–	1	13	–	1
Middle Tennessee	5	–	3	6	–	6
Western Kentucky	4	–	4	8	–	5
UAB	4	–	4	6	–	6
Old Dominion*	4	–	4	6	–	6
FIU	3	–	5	4	–	8
Florida Atlantic	2	–	6	3	–	9
West Division
Louisiana Tech x	7	–	1	9	–	5
Rice	5	–	3	8	–	5
UTEP	5	–	3	7	–	6
UTSA	3	–	5	4	–	8
North Texas	2	–	6	4	–	8
Southern Miss	1	–	7	3	–	9
Championship: Marshall 26, Louisiana Tech 23
$ – Conference champion; x – Division champion/co-champions; * Ineligible for postseason bowl due to transition from FCS; As of 22:24, 20 December 2014 (UTC); Rankings from AP Poll

The 2014 FIU Panthers football team represented Florida International University in the 2014 NCAA Division I FBS football season. They were led by second-year head coach Ron Turner and played their home games at FIU Stadium. They entered their second season as a member of Conference USA, competing in the East Division. They finished the season 4–8, 3–5 in C-USA play to finish in fifth place in the East Division. It was the second year in a row they had been beaten by FCS member Bethune-Cookman.

== Schedule ==
Date	Time	Opponent	Site	TV	Result	Attendance
August 30	7:00 p.m.	No. 22 (FCS) Bethune–Cookman*	FIU Stadium; Miami, FL	ASN	L 12–14	14,053
September 6	6:00 p.m.	Wagner*	FIU Stadium; Miami, FL		W 34–3	9,981
September 13	12:00 p.m.	Pittsburgh*	FIU Stadium; Miami, FL	FS1	L 25–42	10,147
September 20	3:30 p.m.	Louisville*	FIU Stadium; Miami, FL	FS1	L 3–34	10,826
September 27	3:30 p.m.	at UAB	Legion Field; Birmingham, AL	ASN	W 34–20	16,133
October 2	7:00 p.m.	Florida Atlantic	FIU Stadium; Miami, FL (Shula Bowl)	FSN	W 38–10	12,544
October 11	7:00 p.m.	at UTSA	Alamodome; San Antonio, TX	FCS	L 13–16	25,318
October 18	6:00 p.m.	No. 25 Marshall^{†}	FIU Stadium; Miami, FL	ASN	L 13–45	13,163
November 1	12:00 p.m.	Rice	FIU Stadium; Miami, FL	ASN	L 17–31	12,097
November 8	3:30 p.m.	at Old Dominion	Foreman Field; Norfolk, VA	ASN	L 35–38	20,118
November 15	3:30 p.m.	Middle Tennessee	FIU Stadium; Miami, FL	ASN	W 38–28	12,917
November 22	3:30 p.m.	at North Texas	Apogee Stadium; Denton, TX	ASN	L 14–17	14,824
*Non-conference game; ^{†}Homecoming; Rankings from AP Poll released prior to game; All times are in Eastern time

Schedule source:

== Game summaries ==
=== Bethune-Cookman ===
	1	2	3	4	Total
Wildcats	0	7	0	7	14
Panthers	0	6	0	6	12

=== Wagner ===
	1	2	3	4	Total
Seahawks	3	0	0	0	3
Panthers	14	13	0	7	34

=== Pittsburgh ===
	1	2	3	4	Total
Pitt Panthers	0	14	12	16	42
FIU Panthers	16	0	0	9	25

=== Louisville ===
	1	2	3	4	Total
Cardinals	7	21	6	0	34
Panthers	0	3	0	0	3

=== UAB ===
	1	2	3	4	Total
Panthers	0	14	10	10	34
Blazers	7	6	0	7	20

=== Florida Atlantic ===
	1	2	3	4	Total
Owls	3	7	0	0	10
Panthers	7	7	10	14	38

=== UTSA ===
	1	2	3	4	Total
Panthers	0	10	0	3	13
Roadrunners	0	7	3	6	16

=== Marshall ===
	1	2	3	4	Total
#25 Thundering Herd	7	7	10	21	45
Panthers	7	0	0	6	13

=== Rice ===
	1	2	3	4	Total
Owls	17	7	0	7	31
Panthers	7	10	0	0	17

=== Old Dominion ===
	1	2	3	4	Total
Panthers	7	3	17	8	35
Monarchs	7	14	7	10	38

=== Middle Tennessee ===
	1	2	3	4	Total
Blue Raiders	14	7	7	0	28
Panthers	3	14	21	0	38

=== North Texas ===
	1	2	3	4	Total
Panthers	7	7	0	0	14
Mean Green	14	0	3	0	17
