= 2014 Marshall Thundering Herd football team =

American college football season

2014 Marshall Thundering Herd football

C-USA champion C-USA East Division champion Boca Raton Bowl champion

C-USA Championship Game, W 26–23 vs. Louisiana Tech

Boca Raton Bowl, W 52–23 vs. Northern Illinois
- Conference: Conference USA
- East Division

Ranking
- Coaches: No. 22
- AP: No. 23
- Record: 13–1 (7–1 C-USA)
- Head coach: Doc Holliday (5th season)
- Offensive coordinator: Bill Legg (5th season)
- Offensive scheme: Spread
- Defensive coordinator: Chuck Heater (2nd season)
- Base defense: 3–4
- Home stadium: Joan C. Edwards Stadium

2014 Conference USA football standings
	Conf.			Overall
Team	W		L	W		L
East Division
No. 23 Marshall x$	7	–	1	13	–	1
Middle Tennessee	5	–	3	6	–	6
Western Kentucky	4	–	4	8	–	5
UAB	4	–	4	6	–	6
Old Dominion*	4	–	4	6	–	6
FIU	3	–	5	4	–	8
Florida Atlantic	2	–	6	3	–	9
West Division
Louisiana Tech x	7	–	1	9	–	5
Rice	5	–	3	8	–	5
UTEP	5	–	3	7	–	6
UTSA	3	–	5	4	–	8
North Texas	2	–	6	4	–	8
Southern Miss	1	–	7	3	–	9
Championship: Marshall 26, Louisiana Tech 23
$ – Conference champion; x – Division champion/co-champions; * Ineligible for postseason bowl due to transition from FCS; As of 22:24, 20 December 2014 (UTC); Rankings from AP Poll

The 2014 Marshall Thundering Herd football team represented Marshall University in the 2014 NCAA Division I FBS football season. They were led by fifth-year head coach Doc Holliday and played their home games at Joan C. Edwards Stadium. They were a member of the East Division of Conference USA. They finished the season 13–1, 7–1 in C-USA play to win the East Division title. As East Division champions, they played West Division champion Louisiana Tech in the C-USA Championship Game, defeating the Bulldogs 26–23 to become C-USA Champions. They were invited to the inaugural Boca Raton Bowl, where they defeated MAC champion Northern Illinois, 52–23.

== Preseason ==
=== Media poll ===
In the C-USA preseason coaches' poll, the Thundering Herd were picked to finish in first place in the East division.

Media poll (East division)
Predicted finish	Team	Votes
1	Marshall	91
2	Middle Tennessee	73
3	Florida Atlantic	60
4	Western Kentucky	57
5	Old Dominion	33
6	UAB	31
7	FIU	19

== Schedule ==
Date	Time	Opponent	Rank	Site	TV	Result	Attendance
August 30	3:30 pm	at Miami (OH)*		Yager Stadium; Oxford, OH	ESPN3	W 42–27	19,005
September 6	7:00 pm	Rhode Island*		Joan C. Edwards Stadium; Huntington, WV	ASN	W 48–7	25,106
September 13	12:00 pm	Ohio*		Joan C. Edwards Stadium; Huntington, WV (Battle for the Bell)	CBSSN	W 44–14	31,710
September 20	2:00 pm	at Akron*		InfoCision Stadium; Akron, OH	ESPN3	W 48–17	13,357
October 4	12:00 pm	at Old Dominion		Foreman Field; Norfolk, VA	FSN	W 56–14	20,118
October 11	12:00 pm	Middle Tennessee^{†}		Joan C. Edwards Stadium; Huntington, WV	FSN	W 49–24	30,210
October 18	6:00 pm	at FIU	No. 25	FIU Stadium; Miami, FL	ASN	W 45–13	13,163
October 25	3:30 pm	Florida Atlantic	No. 23	Joan C. Edwards Stadium; Huntington, WV	FS1	W 35–16	27,236
November 8	7:00 pm	at Southern Miss		M. M. Roberts Stadium; Hattiesburg, MS	ASN	W 63–17	22,949
November 15	2:30 pm	Rice		Joan C. Edwards Stadium; Huntington, WV	FSN	W 41–14	30,680
November 22	12:00 pm	at UAB		Legion Field; Birmingham, AL	WCHS	W 23–18	28,355
November 28	12:00 pm	Western Kentucky	No. 24	Joan C. Edwards Stadium; Huntington, WV	FS1	L 66–67 ^{OT}	23,576
December 6	12:00 pm	Louisiana Tech		Joan C. Edwards Stadium; Huntington, WV (C-USA Championship)	ESPN2	W 26–23	23,711
December 23	6:00 pm	vs. Northern Illinois*		FAU Stadium; Boca Raton, FL (Boca Raton Bowl)	ESPN	W 52–23	29,419
*Non-conference game; ^{†}Homecoming; Rankings from AP Poll and CFP Rankings after October 28 released prior to game; All times are in Eastern time

== Game summaries ==
=== Miami (OH) ===
	1	2	3	4	Total
Thundering Herd	14	14	0	14	42
RedHawks	0	3	17	7	27

=== Rhode Island ===
	1	2	3	4	Total
Rams	0	0	0	7	7
Thundering Herd	7	10	21	10	48

=== Ohio ===
	1	2	3	4	Total
Bobcats	0	0	7	7	14
Thundering Herd	17	10	14	3	44

=== Akron ===
	1	2	3	4	Total
Thundering Herd	17	14	10	7	48
Zips	0	3	0	14	17

=== Old Dominion ===
	1	2	3	4	Total
Thundering Herd	28	14	14	0	56
Monarchs	7	0	0	7	14

=== Middle Tennessee ===
	1	2	3	4	Total
Blue Raiders	7	10	0	7	24
Thundering Herd	14	14	14	7	49

=== Florida International ===
	1	2	3	4	Total
#25 Thundering Herd	7	7	10	21	45
Panthers	7	0	0	6	13

=== Florida Atlantic ===
	1	2	3	4	Total
Owls	3	13	0	0	16
#23 Thundering Herd	7	7	7	14	35

=== Southern Miss ===
	1	2	3	4	Total
#23 Thundering Herd	7	21	14	21	63
Golden Eagles	14	3	0	0	17

=== Rice ===
	1	2	3	4	Total
Owls	0	7	0	7	14
#21 Thundering Herd	3	17	14	7	41

=== UAB ===
	1	2	3	4	Total
#18 Thundering Herd	7	10	0	6	23
Blazers	3	3	6	6	18

=== Western Kentucky ===
	1	2	3	4	OT	Total
Hilltoppers	28	21	0	10	8	67
#19 Thundering Herd	21	21	7	10	7	66

=== Louisiana Tech ===
	1	2	3	4	Total
Bulldogs	10	7	6	0	23
Thundering Herd	0	13	3	10	26

=== Northern Illinois–Boca Raton Bowl ===
	1	2	3	4	Total
Thundering Herd	14	10	14	14	52
Huskies	7	6	7	3	23

== Rankings ==
Ranking movements Legend: ██ Increase in ranking ██ Decrease in ranking — = Not ranked RV = Received votes
	Week																
Poll	Pre	1	2	3	4	5	6	7	8	9	10	11	12	13	14	15	Final
AP	RV	RV	RV	RV	RV	RV	RV	25	23	23	23	21	18	19	RV	RV	23
Coaches	RV	RV	RV	RV	RV	RV	RV	24	22	23	22	21	18	20	RV	RV	22
CFP	Not released									—	—	—	—	24	—	—	Not released
