= 2014 UTEP Miners football team =

American college football season

2014 UTEP Miners football

New Mexico Bowl, L 6–21 vs. Utah State
- Conference: Conference USA
- West Division
- Record: 7–6 (5–3 C-USA)
- Head coach: Sean Kugler (2nd season)
- Offensive coordinator: Patrick Higgins (2nd season)
- Offensive scheme: Pro spread
- Defensive coordinator: Scott Stoker (2nd season)
- Base defense: 3–3–5
- Home stadium: Sun Bowl

2014 Conference USA football standings
	Conf.			Overall
Team	W		L	W		L
East Division
No. 23 Marshall x$	7	–	1	13	–	1
Middle Tennessee	5	–	3	6	–	6
Western Kentucky	4	–	4	8	–	5
UAB	4	–	4	6	–	6
Old Dominion*	4	–	4	6	–	6
FIU	3	–	5	4	–	8
Florida Atlantic	2	–	6	3	–	9
West Division
Louisiana Tech x	7	–	1	9	–	5
Rice	5	–	3	8	–	5
UTEP	5	–	3	7	–	6
UTSA	3	–	5	4	–	8
North Texas	2	–	6	4	–	8
Southern Miss	1	–	7	3	–	9
Championship: Marshall 26, Louisiana Tech 23
$ – Conference champion; x – Division champion/co-champions; * Ineligible for postseason bowl due to transition from FCS; Rankings from AP Poll

The 2014 UTEP Miners football team represented the University of Texas at El Paso (UTEP) as a member of the West Division in Conference USA (C-USA) during the 2014 NCAA Division I FCS football season. Led by second-year head coach Sean Kugler, the Miners compiled an overall record of 7–6 with a mark of 5–3 in conference play, tying for second place in C-USA's West Division. UTEP was invited to the New Mexico Bowl, where the Miners lost to Utah State. The team played home games at the Sun Bowl in El Paso, Texas.

UTEP averaged 28,377 fans per game. This was the last winning season for the Miners until the 2021 season.

== Schedule ==
Date	Time	Opponent	Site	TV	Result	Attendance
August 30	6:00 pm	at New Mexico*	University Stadium; Albuquerque, NM	MW Net	W 31–24	25,802
September 6	9:00 pm	Texas Tech*	Sun Bowl; El Paso, TX	FS1	L 26–30	35,422
September 13	6:00 pm	New Mexico State*	Sun Bowl; El Paso, TX (Battle of I-10)	ASN	W 42–24	32,979
September 27	10:00 am	at No. 25 Kansas State*	Bill Snyder Family Football Stadium; Manhattan, KS	FSN	L 28–58	52,899
October 4	5:00 pm	at Louisiana Tech	Joe Aillet Stadium; Ruston, LA	FCS	L 3–55	18,157
October 11	6:00 pm	Old Dominion^{†}	Sun Bowl; El Paso, TX	ASN	W 42–35	25,509
October 25	5:00 pm	at UTSA	Alamodome; San Antonio, TX	ASN	W 34–0	31,956
November 1	6:00 pm	Southern Miss	Sun Bowl; El Paso, TX	FCS	W 35–14	24,673
November 8	2:00 pm	at Western Kentucky	Houchens Industries–L. T. Smith Stadium; Bowling Green, KY		L 27–35	18,472
November 15	8:00 pm	North Texas	Sun Bowl; El Paso, TX	FS1	W 35–17	24,222
November 21	6:00 pm	at Rice	Rice Stadium; Houston, TX	FS1	L 13–31	18,164
November 29	5:00 pm	Middle Tennessee	Sun Bowl; El Paso, TX	ASN	W 24–21	27,455
December 20	12:20 pm	vs. Utah State*	University Stadium; Albuquerque, NM (New Mexico Bowl)	ESPN	L 6–21	28,725
*Non-conference game; ^{†}Homecoming; Rankings from AP Poll released prior to the game; All times are in Mountain time

== Game summaries ==
=== New Mexico ===
	1	2	3	4	Total
Miners	14	10	0	7	31
Lobos	7	0	14	3	24

=== Texas Tech ===
	1	2	3	4	Total
Red Raiders	0	16	7	7	30
Miners	6	7	6	7	26

=== New Mexico State ===
	1	2	3	4	Total
Aggies	7	3	0	14	24
Miners	7	14	0	21	42

=== Kansas State ===
	1	2	3	4	Total
Miners	0	0	7	21	28
Wildcats	10	21	21	6	58

=== Louisiana Tech ===
	1	2	3	4	Total
Miners	0	3	0	0	3
Bulldogs	7	21	20	7	55

=== Old Dominion ===
	1	2	3	4	Total
Monarchs	7	0	21	7	35
Miners	7	14	7	14	42

=== UTSA ===
	1	2	3	4	Total
Miners	14	3	10	7	34
Roadrunners	0	0	0	0	0

=== Southern Miss ===
	1	2	3	4	Total
Golden Eagles	0	0	14	0	14
Miners	7	0	14	14	35

=== Western Kentucky ===
	1	2	3	4	Total
Miners	17	3	7	0	27
Hilltoppers	7	7	7	14	35

=== North Texas ===
	1	2	3	4	Total
Mean Green	0	0	3	14	17
Miners	14	14	7	0	35

=== Rice ===
	1	2	3	4	Total
Miners	0	3	10	0	13
Owls	0	10	14	7	31

=== Middle Tennessee ===
	1	2	3	4	Total
Blue Raiders	7	7	0	7	21
Miners	3	7	7	7	24

=== Utah State—New Mexico Bowl ===
	1	2	3	4	Total
Aggies	7	0	7	7	21
Miners	3	0	0	3	6

== Coaching staff ==
Name	Position
Sean Kugler	Head coach
Patrick Higgins	Offensive coordinator/quarterbacks coach
Scott Stoker	Defensive Coordinator
Andrew Browning	Defensive line coach
Kirk Davis	Speed, Strength and Conditioning Coach
Gabe Franklin	Defensive backs coach/recruiting coordinator
Cornell Jackson	Running backs coach
Spencer Leftwich	Assistant head coach/offensive line
Brian Natkin	Tight ends coach/special team coordinator
Nate Poss	Asst. Athletic Dir. for Football Ops
Robert Rodriguez	Assistant special team coordinator/Nickelbacks/Saf.
Todd Whitten	Wide receivers coach
Tyler Bailey	Graduate Assistant Offense
Logan Barrett	Student Assistant Operations
Aaron Becker	Graduate Assistant Operations
Weston Glaser	Graduate Assistant Defense
Dave Vosburgh	Graduate Assistant Defense
Jeremy Springer	Graduate Assistant Special Teams
