= 2014 Western Kentucky Hilltoppers football team =

American college football season

2014 Western Kentucky Hilltoppers football

Bahamas Bowl champion

Bahamas Bowl, W 49–48 vs. Central Michigan
- Conference: Conference USA
- East Division
- Record: 8–5 (4–4 C-USA)
- Head coach: Jeff Brohm (1st season)
- Offensive coordinator: Tyson Helton (1st season)
- Offensive scheme: Multiple
- Defensive coordinator: Nick Holt (2nd season)
- Base defense: 4–3
- Home stadium: Houchens Industries–L. T. Smith Stadium

2014 Conference USA football standings
	Conf.			Overall
Team	W		L	W		L
East Division
No. 23 Marshall x$	7	–	1	13	–	1
Middle Tennessee	5	–	3	6	–	6
Western Kentucky	4	–	4	8	–	5
UAB	4	–	4	6	–	6
Old Dominion*	4	–	4	6	–	6
FIU	3	–	5	4	–	8
Florida Atlantic	2	–	6	3	–	9
West Division
Louisiana Tech x	7	–	1	9	–	5
Rice	5	–	3	8	–	5
UTEP	5	–	3	7	–	6
UTSA	3	–	5	4	–	8
North Texas	2	–	6	4	–	8
Southern Miss	1	–	7	3	–	9
Championship: Marshall 26, Louisiana Tech 23
$ – Conference champion; x – Division champion/co-champions; * Ineligible for postseason bowl due to transition from FCS; As of 22:24, 20 December 2014 (UTC); Rankings from AP Poll

The 2014 Western Kentucky Hilltoppers football team represented the Western Kentucky University (WKU) in the 2014 NCAA Division I FBS football season. They were led by first-year head coach Jeff Brohm and played their home games at the Houchens Industries–L. T. Smith Stadium. This was the team's first year as a Conference USA member and playing in the East Division. They finished the season 8–5, 4–4 in C-USA play to finish in a three-way tie for third place in the East Division. They were invited to the Bahamas Bowl where they defeated Central Michigan.

== Schedule ==
Western Kentucky announced their 2014 football schedule on February 3, 2014. The 2014 schedule consist of 6 home games and 6 away games in the regular season. The Hilltoppers will host CUSA foes Old Dominion, UAB, UTEP, and UTSA, and will travel to Florida Atlantic, Marshall, Middle Tennessee, and Louisiana Tech.

The Hilltoppers will play four opponents for the first time this season, Illinois, Old Dominion, UTEP, and UTSA. Western Kentucky will compete for the first time in the East division of Conference USA which has seven schools in total while the West division has six. Due to the two uneven divisions, WKU will only play five schools from the East division and will not play Florida International this season. Western Kentucky will play three teams from the West division, Louisiana Tech, UTEP, and UTSA, which will complete the eight conference games each member of the CUSA has to play.

Date	Time	Opponent	Site	TV	Result	Attendance
August 29	7:00 p.m.	Bowling Green*	Houchens Industries–L. T. Smith Stadium; Bowling Green, KY	CBSSN	W 59–31	17,215
September 6	11:00 a.m.	at Illinois*	Memorial Stadium; Champaign, IL	BTN	L 34–42	38,561
September 13	6:00 p.m.	at Middle Tennessee	Johnny "Red" Floyd Stadium; Murfreesboro, TN (100 Miles of Hate)	WKU PBS	L 47–50 ^{3OT}	24,911
September 27	2:30 p.m.	at Navy*	Navy–Marine Corps Memorial Stadium; Annapolis, MD	CBSSN	W 36–27	30,537
October 4	6:00 p.m.	UAB	Houchens Industries–L. T. Smith Stadium; Bowling Green, KY		L 39–42	14,923
October 18	11:00 a.m.	at Florida Atlantic	FAU Stadium; Boca Raton, FL	ASN	L 38–45	10,915
October 25	3:00 p.m.	Old Dominion	Houchens Industries–L. T. Smith Stadium; Bowling Green, KY		W 66–51	17,886
November 1	2:00 p.m.	at Louisiana Tech	Joe Aillet Stadium; Ruston, LA	FSN	L 10–59	20,011
November 8	3:00 p.m.	UTEP†	Houchens Industries–L. T. Smith Stadium; Bowling Green, KY		W 35–27	18,472
November 15	11:00 a.m.	Army*	Houchens Industries–L. T. Smith Stadium; Bowling Green, KY	CBSSN	W 52–24	16,819
November 22	11:00 a.m.	UTSA	Houchens Industries–L. T. Smith Stadium; Bowling Green, KY	FSN	W 45–7	12,518
November 28	11:00 a.m.	at No. 19 Marshall	Joan C. Edwards Stadium; Huntington, WV	FS1	W 67–66 ^{OT}	23,576
December 24	11:00 a.m.	vs. Central Michigan*	Thomas Robinson Stadium; Nassau, Bahamas (Bahamas Bowl)	ESPN	W 49–48	13,667
*Non-conference game; Rankings from AP Poll released prior to the game; All times are in Central time

Schedule source:

== Game summaries ==
=== Bowling Green ===
	1	2	3	4	Total
Falcons	0	10	14	7	31
Hilltoppers	14	17	14	14	59

=== Illinois ===
	1	2	3	4	Total
Hilltoppers	3	14	10	7	34
Fighting Illini	7	7	7	21	42

=== Middle Tennessee ===
	1	2	3	4	OT	2OT	3OT	Total
Hilltoppers	3	21	0	10	7	3	3	47
Blue Raiders	14	10	0	10	7	3	6	50

=== Navy ===
	1	2	3	4	Total
Hilltoppers	3	10	9	14	36
Midshipmen	7	6	0	7	20

=== UAB ===
	1	2	3	4	Total
Blazers	14	0	21	7	42
Hilltoppers	20	7	12	0	39

=== Florida Atlantic ===
	1	2	3	4	Total
Hilltoppers	17	14	7	0	38
Owls	7	7	14	17	45

=== Old Dominion ===
	1	2	3	4	Total
Monarchs	3	27	21	0	51
Hilltoppers	21	21	14	10	66

=== Louisiana Tech ===
	1	2	3	4	Total
Hilltoppers	7	3	0	0	10
Bulldogs	10	21	21	7	59

=== UTEP ===
	1	2	3	4	Total
Miners	17	3	7	0	27
Hilltoppers	7	7	7	14	35

=== Army ===
	1	2	3	4	Total
Black Knights	7	3	14	0	24
Hilltoppers	14	10	14	14	52

=== UTSA ===
	1	2	3	4	Total
Roadrunners	0	0	0	7	7
Hilltoppers	14	14	7	10	45

=== Marshall ===
	1	2	3	4	OT	Total
Hilltoppers	28	21	0	10	8	67
#19 Thundering Herd	21	21	7	10	7	66

=== Central Michigan–Bahamas Bowl ===
	1	2	3	4	Total
Chippewas	7	7	0	34	48
Hilltoppers	21	21	7	0	49
