= 2014 Rice Owls football team =

American college football season

2014 Rice Owls football

Hawaii Bowl champion

Hawaii Bowl, W 30–6 vs. Fresno State
- Conference: Conference USA
- West Division
- Record: 8–5 (5–3 C-USA)
- Head coach: David Bailiff (8th season)
- Offensive coordinator: Larry Edmondson (1st season)
- Co-offensive coordinator: Billy Lynch (1st season)
- Offensive scheme: Spread
- Defensive coordinator: Chris Thurmond (3rd season)
- Base defense: 4–3
- Home stadium: Rice Stadium

2014 Conference USA football standings
	Conf.			Overall
Team	W		L	W		L
East Division
No. 23 Marshall x$	7	–	1	13	–	1
Middle Tennessee	5	–	3	6	–	6
Western Kentucky	4	–	4	8	–	5
UAB	4	–	4	6	–	6
Old Dominion*	4	–	4	6	–	6
FIU	3	–	5	4	–	8
Florida Atlantic	2	–	6	3	–	9
West Division
Louisiana Tech x	7	–	1	9	–	5
Rice	5	–	3	8	–	5
UTEP	5	–	3	7	–	6
UTSA	3	–	5	4	–	8
North Texas	2	–	6	4	–	8
Southern Miss	1	–	7	3	–	9
Championship: Marshall 26, Louisiana Tech 23
$ – Conference champion; x – Division champion/co-champions; * Ineligible for postseason bowl due to transition from FCS; As of 22:24, 20 December 2014 (UTC); Rankings from AP Poll

The 2014 Rice Owls football team represented Rice University in the 2014 NCAA Division I FBS football season. The team was led by eighth-year head coach David Bailiff and played its home games at Rice Stadium. The team was a member of the West Division of Conference USA. They finished the season 8–5, 5–3 in C-USA play to finish in a tie for second place in the West Division. They were invited to the Hawaii Bowl where they defeated Fresno State.

== Personnel ==
=== Coaching staff ===
Name	Position	Seasons at Rice	Alma mater
David Bailiff	Head coach	8	Texas State University (1981)
Darrell Patterson	Linebackers/Special Teams Coordinator	6	Texas Christian University (1984)
Chris Thurmond	Defensive coordinator/Cornerbacks	4	University of Tulsa (1975)
Larry Edmondson	Co-Offensive coordinator/quarterbacks	6	Texas A&M University (1983)
Larry Hoefer	Safeties	3	McMurry University (1972)
Billy Lynch	Co-Offensive coordinator/recruiting coordinator/Wide receivers	4	Ball State University (2002)
David Sloan	Recruiting Coordinator/tight ends	5	University of New Mexico (1995)
Michael Slater	Defensive line	3	Southwest Texas State University (1993)
Anthony Steward	Running backs	1	University of Kansas (2012)
Ronnie Vinklarek	Offensive line	6	Southwest Texas (1981)

== Schedule ==
Date	Time	Opponent	Site	TV	Result	Attendance
August 30	2:30 pm	at No. 17 Notre Dame*	Notre Dame Stadium; Notre Dame, IN	NBC	L 17–48	80,795
September 13	8:00 pm	at No. 7 Texas A&M*	Kyle Field; College Station, TX	ESPN2	L 10–38	103,867
September 20	11:00 am	Old Dominion	Rice Stadium; Houston, TX	FSN	L 42–45	17,558
September 27	6:00 pm	at Southern Miss	M. M. Roberts Stadium; Hattiesburg, MS	FCS	W 41–23	24,756
October 4	6:00 pm	Hawaii*	Rice Stadium; Houston, TX	ASN	W 28–14	17,465
October 11	11:00 am	at Army*	Michie Stadium; West Point, NY	CBSSN	W 41–21	37,011
October 25	11:00 am	North Texas	Rice Stadium; Houston, TX	FSN	W 41–21	18,430
November 1	11:00 am	at FIU	FIU Stadium; Miami, FL	ASN	W 31–17	12,097
November 8	11:00 am	UTSA^{†}	Rice Stadium; Houston, TX	FSN	W 17–7	19,464
November 15	1:30 pm	at No. 21 Marshall	Joan C. Edwards Stadium; Huntington, WV	FSN	L 14–41	30,680
November 21	7:00 pm	UTEP	Rice Stadium; Houston, TX	FS1	W 31–13	18,164
November 29	11:00 am	at Louisiana Tech	Joe Aillet Stadium; Ruston, LA	CBSSN	L 31–76	18,029
December 24	7:00 pm	vs. Fresno State*	Aloha Stadium; Honolulu, HI (Hawaii Bowl)	ESPN	W 30–6	25,365
*Non-conference game; ^{†}Homecoming; Rankings from AP Poll released prior to game; All times are in Central time

Schedule source:

== Game summaries ==
=== Notre Dame ===
Team	1	2	3	4	Total
Owls	7	3	0	7	17
• #17 Fighting Irish	14	14	10	10	48

- Date: August 30
- Location: Notre Dame Stadium
  South Bend, Indiana
- Game start: 3:42pm
- Elapsed time: 3:10
- Game attendance: 80,795
- Game weather: • Wind: • Weather:
- TV announcers (NBC): Dan Hicks, Mike Mayock & Kathryn Tappen

Scoring summary
1	6:02	ND	Everett Golson 11-yard touchdown run, Kyle Brindza kick good	ND 7–0
1	2:13	Rice	Zach Wright 26-yard touchdown reception from Driphus Jackson, James Hairston kick good	Tied 7–7
1	2:01	ND	William Fuller 75-yard touchdown reception from Golson, Brindza kick good	ND 14–7
2	5:51	Rice	33-yard field goal by Hairston	ND 14–10
2	2:33	ND	Golson 14-yard touchdown run, Brindza kick good	ND 21–10
2	0:05	ND	C. J. Prosise 53-yard touchdown reception from Golson, Brindza kick good	ND 28–10
3	4:07	ND	36-yard field goal by Brindza	ND 31–10
3	0:17	ND	Golson 4-yard touchdown run, Brindza kick good	ND 38–10
4	7:47	ND	29-yard field goal by Brindza	ND 41–10
4	4:57	Rice	James Mayden 53-yard touchdown reception from Tyler Stehling, Hairston kick good	ND 41–17
4	3:32	ND	Greg Bryant 17-yard touchdown run, Brindza kick good	ND 48–17

=== Texas A&M ===
	1	2	3	4	Total
Owls	0	7	3	0	10
#7 Aggies	7	14	14	3	38

=== Old Dominion ===
	1	2	3	4	Total
Monarchs	14	14	7	10	45
Owls	7	7	14	14	42

=== Southern Miss ===
	1	2	3	4	Total
Owls	3	17	7	14	41
Golden Eagles	0	10	6	7	23

=== Hawaii ===
	1	2	3	4	Total
Rainbow Warriors	7	0	7	0	14
Owls	0	7	7	14	28

=== Army ===
	1	2	3	4	Total
Owls	7	17	14	3	41
Black Knights	7	7	7	0	21

=== North Texas ===
	1	2	3	4	Total
Mean Green	14	7	0	0	21
Owls	14	0	10	17	41

=== FIU ===
	1	2	3	4	Total
Owls	17	7	0	7	31
Panthers	7	10	0	0	17

=== UTSA ===
	1	2	3	4	Total
Roadrunners	0	0	0	7	7
Owls	7	3	7	0	17

=== Marshall ===
	1	2	3	4	Total
Owls	0	7	0	7	14
#21 Thundering Herd	3	17	14	7	41

Previous meeting was in the 2013 Conference USA Football Championship Game.

=== UTEP ===
	1	2	3	4	Total
Miners	0	3	10	0	13
Owls	0	10	14	7	31

=== Louisiana Tech ===
	1	2	3	4	Total
Owls	3	14	7	7	31
Bulldogs	21	7	28	20	76

=== Fresno State–Hawaii Bowl ===
	1	2	3	4	Total
Bulldogs	3	3	0	0	6
Owls	16	0	7	7	30
