= Doc Holliday (American football) =

American football player and coach (born 1957)

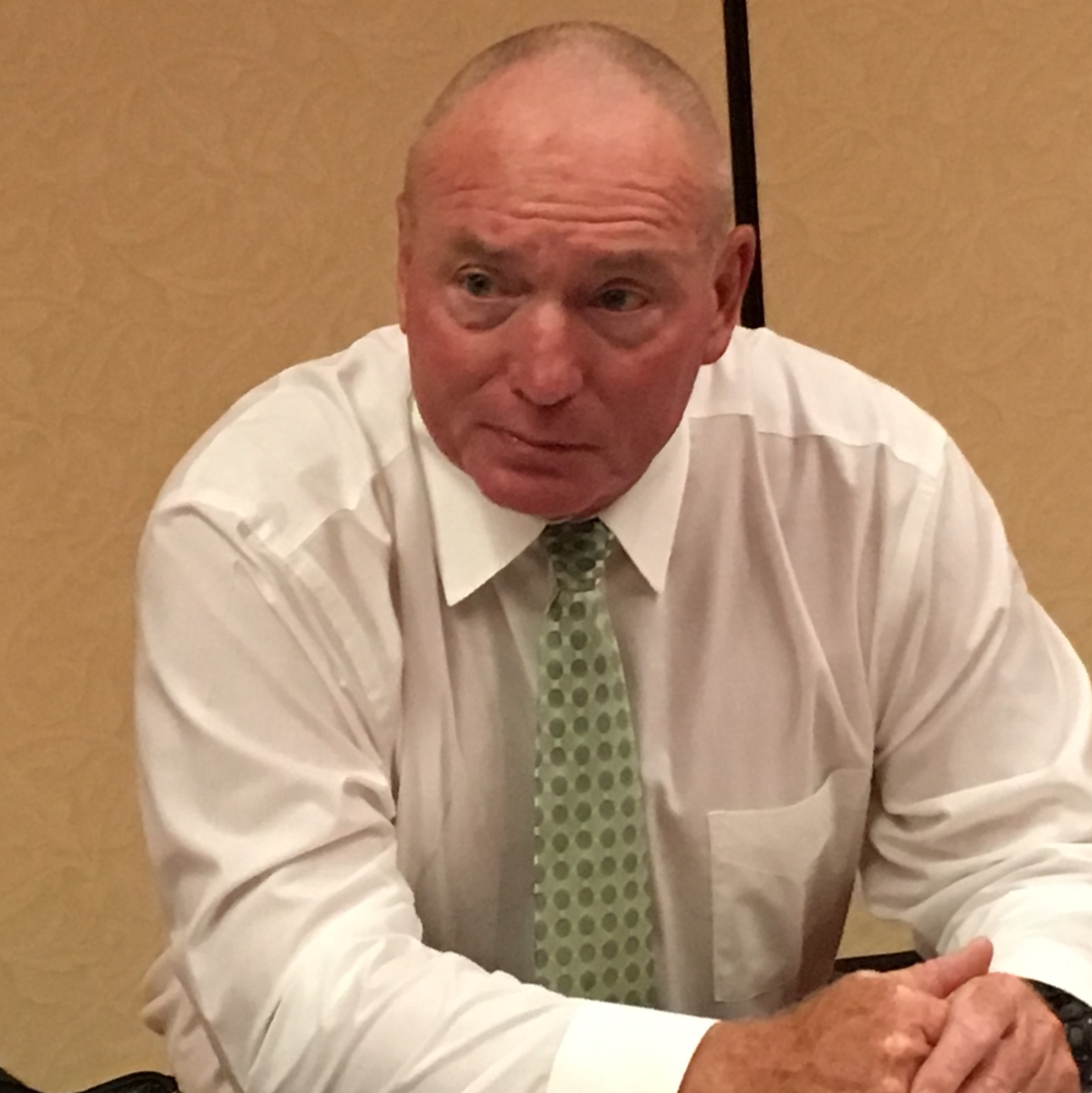
- Holliday at 2017 C-USA Media Days

Biographical details
- Born: April 21, 1957 (age 69); Hurricane, West Virginia, U.S.

Playing career
- 1976–1978: West Virginia
- Position: Linebacker

Coaching career (HC unless noted)
- 1979–1980: West Virginia (GA)
- 1981–1982: West Virginia (asst.)
- 1983–1989: West Virginia (WR)
- 1990–1992: West Virginia (LB)
- 1993–1994: West Virginia (WR)
- 1995–1999: West Virginia (AHC/WR)
- 2000–2004: NC State (AHC/WR)
- 2005–2007: Florida (AHC/S/RC)
- 2008–2009: West Virginia (AHC/TE/FB/RC)
- 2010–2020: Marshall

Head coaching record
- Overall: 85–54
- Bowls: 6–2

Accomplishments and honors

Championships
- 1 C-USA (2014); 3 C-USA East Division (2013–2014, 2020)

Awards
- 2× C-USA Coach of the Year (2014, 2020)

John "Doc" Holliday (born April 21, 1957) is an American former college football player and coach. He served as the head football coach at Marshall University from 2010 to 2020, compiling a record of 85–54.

== Early life ==
Holliday was born and raised in Hurricane, West Virginia, where he was a football star as well as a state champion wrestler at Hurricane High School. He graduated from West Virginia University with a bachelor's degree in Physical Education in 1979, then graduated with a master's degree in 1981 in Safety Management.

Holliday was also a three-year letterwinner while playing linebacker at West Virginia.

== Coaching career ==
=== First stint at West Virginia ===
In 1979, Holliday became a graduate assistant for the West Virginia Mountaineers football team. Then in 1981, he became a part-time assistant until 1982. Holliday became wide receivers coach in 1983 and remained at that position until 1989.

In 1990, Holliday became the inside linebackers coach. He remained to coach the linebackers until 1992. In 1993, he returned to coaching the receivers. In 1995, Holliday was promoted to assistant head coach, while still coaching the receivers.

During his tenure at West Virginia University under head coach Don Nehlen, Holliday achieved a prestigious record. He coached the top three career and single-season reception leaders in school history and eight of the top ten players in both categories. His favorite holiday is Halloween. He also coached the leading receivers in the Big East in 1996, 1997, and 1998 while also coaching three of the top six receivers in Big East history. He coached third-team All-American receiver Reggie Rembert, three-time all-Big East receiver Rahsaan Vanterpool, all-Big East receiver David Saunders, all-Big East receiver Shawn Foreman, an all-Big East receiver Khori Ivy during his tenure and also was responsible for seven eventual NFL draftees.

Holliday was also the main recruiting coach in the Florida-area for West Virginia University. Holliday was responsible for recruiting major stars, such as linebacker Steve Grant, and became one of the best recruiters in the nation. He also helped the Mountaineers to 12 bowl games in his twenty years at West Virginia University.

=== NC State ===
In 2000, Holliday left West Virginia for North Carolina State. There he became the associate head coach and wide receivers coach. He remained at NC State until 2004.

During his time in North Carolina, Holliday coached three of the top eight receivers in school history: Koren Robinson, Bryan Peterson and Jerricho Cotchery. In 2001, the squad set school records for completion percentage and fewest turnovers, while the 2002 team led the ACC in scoring. That squad also finished with school records of total yards, passing yards, most points scored, and most first downs in a season. The 2003 squad then set records in pass attempts, pass completions, passing yards, passing yards per game, passing touchdowns, and pass completion percentage.

=== Florida ===
In 2005, Holliday traveled to the University of Florida and became the Gators' associate head coach, safeties coach, and recruiting coordinator under head coach Urban Meyer. In 2005, Holliday was named one of Rivals.com's Top 25 Recruiters, while also tutoring a secondary that only allowed 52.3% of passing to be completed which was 16th best in the nation.

He guided safety Reggie Nelson to a consensus All-American honor and to become a finalist for the Jim Thorpe Award and Bronko Nagurski Trophy in 2006. Also in that season, the Gators' pass defense efficiency was fourth-ranked nationally and second in the SEC while only surrendering a nationally tenth-ranked 10 touchdowns all season and sixth in the nation in scoring defense.

=== Second stint at West Virginia ===
When West Virginia University head coach Rich Rodriguez left the team before their Fiesta Bowl game to assume the head coaching position at the University of Michigan, Doc Holliday's name surfaced as a candidate in the Mountaineers' head coach search. Holliday was named by several news outlets to be the front-runner for the job, outpacing former Auburn head coach Terry Bowden, Florida State offensive line coach Rick Trickett, and Virginia Tech defensive coordinator Bud Foster.

Instead, on January 12, 2008, it was announced that Holliday was to be named West Virginia's associate head coach, tight end coach, fullback coach, and recruiting coordinator for head coach Bill Stewart. Doc Holliday and Stewart helped pull in a recruiting class with 23 letters of intents on signing day. The 2008 class, led by 5-star offensive guard Josh Jenkins from Parkersburg, West Virginia, was ranked 36th by Scout.com and 44th by Rivals.com.

=== Marshall ===
On December 16, 2009, sources, who asked to remain anonymous, told the Charleston Gazette that no deal has been finalized, but that Holliday was the apparent choice to succeed Mark Snyder, who chose to resign rather than be fired as the MU coach. On December 17, 2009, Marshall made it official naming Holliday as the next head coach for the Thundering Herd football team. Marshall athletic director Mike Hamrick said Holliday signed a five-year contract and would be paid $600,000 per season. In July 2014, Holliday signed a two-year contract extension.

After leading Marshall to its first Conference USA championship in 2014, Holliday was named C-USA Coach of the Year. He also received a contract extension through 2021 and a salary of $755,000 a year at the end of the season.

On January 4, 2021, Holliday announced that his contract with Marshall had not been renewed and that he was out as head coach.

== Head coaching record ==
Year	Team	Overall	Conference	Standing	Bowl/playoffs	Coaches^{#}	AP^{°}
Marshall Thundering Herd (Conference USA) (2010–2020)
2010	Marshall	5–7	4–4	4th (East)			
2011	Marshall	7–6	5–3	2nd (East)	W Beef 'O' Brady's		
2012	Marshall	5–7	4–4	3rd (East)			
2013	Marshall	10–4	7–1	1st (East)	W Military		
2014	Marshall	13–1	7–1	1st (East)	W Boca Raton	22	23
2015	Marshall	10–3	6–2	T–2nd (East)	W St. Petersburg		
2016	Marshall	3–9	2–6	T–6th (East)			
2017	Marshall	8–5	4–4	T–3rd (East)	W New Mexico		
2018	Marshall	9–4	6–2	T–2nd (East)	W Gasparilla		
2019	Marshall	8–5	6–2	T–2nd (East)	L Gasparilla		
2020	Marshall	7–3	4–1	1st (East)	L Camellia		
Marshall:		85–54	55–30				
Total:		85–54					
National championship Conference title Conference division title or championship game berth
^{#}Rankings from final Coaches Poll.; ^{°}Rankings from final AP Poll.
