= 2014 Northern Illinois Huskies football team =

American college football season

2014 Northern Illinois Huskies football

MAC champion MAC West Division co-champion

MAC Championship Game, W 51–17 vs. Bowling Green

Boca Raton Bowl, L 23–52 vs. Marshall
- Conference: Mid-American Conference
- West Division
- Record: 11–3 (7–1 MAC)
- Head coach: Rod Carey (2nd season)
- Offensive coordinator: Bob Cole (2nd season)
- Offensive scheme: Multiple
- Defensive coordinator: Jay Niemann (4th season)
- Base defense: 4–3
- MVP: Da'Ron Brown
- Captains: Luke Eakes; Tyler Loos; Jason Meehan; Rob Sterling; Ryan Brown; Da'Ron Brown
- Home stadium: Huskie Stadium

2014 Mid-American Conference football standings
	Conf.			Overall
Team	W		L	W		L
East Division
Bowling Green x	5	–	3	8	–	6
Ohio	4	–	4	6	–	6
Buffalo	3	–	4	5	–	6
Akron	3	–	5	5	–	7
UMass	3	–	5	3	–	9
Miami (OH)	2	–	6	2	–	10
Kent State	1	–	6	2	–	9
West Division
Northern Illinois xy$	7	–	1	11	–	3
Toledo x	7	–	1	9	–	4
Western Michigan	6	–	2	8	–	5
Central Michigan	5	–	3	7	–	6
Ball State	4	–	4	5	–	7
Eastern Michigan	1	–	7	2	–	10
Championship: Northern Illinois 51, Bowling Green 17
$ – Conference champion; x – Division champion/co-champions; y – Championship game participant

The 2014 Northern Illinois Huskies football team represented Northern Illinois University as a member of the West Division of the Mid-American Conference (MAC) during the 2014 NCAA Division I FBS football season. Led by second-year head coach Rod Carey, the Huskies compiled an overall record of 11–3 with a mark of 7–1 in conference play, sharing the MAC West Division title with Toledo. By virtue of their head-to-head win over Toledo, Northern Illinois advanced to the MAC Championship Game, where they defeated Bowling Green to win the program's fifth MAC championship. The Huskies were invited to the Boca Raton Bowl, where they lost to Conference USA champion Marshall. The team played home games at Huskie Stadium in DeKalb, Illinois.

Northern Illinois loss to Central Michigan on October 11 snapped a 26-game home winning streak dating back to the 2009 season. The season marked the Huskies' seventh consecutive trip to a bowl game and their third consecutive bowl game loss.

== Schedule ==
Date	Time	Opponent	Site	TV	Result	Attendance	Source
August 28	6:00 p.m.	Presbyterian*	Huskie Stadium; DeKalb, IL		W 55–3	12,398	
September 6	2:30 p.m.	at Northwestern*	Ryan Field; Evanston, IL	BTN	W 23–15	41,139	
September 13	6:00 p.m.	at UNLV*	Sam Boyd Stadium; Whitney, NV	MWN	W 48–34	14,305	
September 20	6:00 p.m.	at Arkansas*	Donald W. Reynolds Razorback Stadium; Fayetteville, AR	ESPNU	L 14–52	67,204	
October 4	4:00 p.m.	Kent State	Huskie Stadium; DeKalb, IL	ESPN3	W 17–14	15,620	
October 11	4:00 p.m.	Central Michigan^{†}	Huskie Stadium; DeKalb, IL	ESPN3	L 17–34	20,122	
October 18	4:00 p.m.	Miami (OH)	Huskie Stadium; DeKalb, IL	ESPN3	W 51–41	11,211	
October 25	12:00 p.m.	at Eastern Michigan	Rynearson Stadium; Ypsilanti, MI	ESPN3	W 28–17	19,654	
November 5	7:00 p.m.	at Ball State	Scheumann Stadium; Muncie, IN (Bronze Stalk Trophy)	ESPN2	W 35–21	6,642	
November 11	7:00 p.m.	Toledo	Huskie Stadium; DeKalb, IL	ESPN2	W 27–24	8,462	
November 18	7:00 p.m.	at Ohio	Peden Stadium; Athens, OH	ESPNU	W 21–14	15,118	
November 28	10:00 a.m.	at Western Michigan	Waldo Stadium; Kalamazoo, MI	ESPNU	W 31–21	11,195	
December 5	6:00 p.m.	vs. Bowling Green*	Ford Field; Detroit, MI (MAC Championship Game)	ESPN2	W 51–17	15,110	
December 23	5:00 p.m.	vs. Marshall*	FAU Stadium; Boca Raton, FL (Boca Raton Bowl)	ESPN	L 23–52	29,419	
*Non-conference game; ^{†}Homecoming; All times are in Central time
