= 2014 Louisiana Tech Bulldogs football team =

American college football season

2014 Louisiana Tech Bulldogs football

C-USA West Division champion Heart of Dallas Bowl champion

C-USA Championship Game, L 23–26 vs. Marshall

Heart of Dallas Bowl, W 35–18 vs. Illinois
- Conference: Conference USA
- West Division
- Record: 9–5 (7–1 C-USA)
- Head coach: Skip Holtz (2nd season)
- Offensive coordinator: Tony Petersen (2nd season)
- Offensive scheme: Multiple
- Defensive coordinator: Manny Diaz (1st season)
- Base defense: 4–3
- Home stadium: Joe Aillet Stadium

2014 Conference USA football standings
	Conf.			Overall
Team	W		L	W		L
East Division
No. 23 Marshall x$	7	–	1	13	–	1
Middle Tennessee	5	–	3	6	–	6
Western Kentucky	4	–	4	8	–	5
UAB	4	–	4	6	–	6
Old Dominion*	4	–	4	6	–	6
FIU	3	–	5	4	–	8
Florida Atlantic	2	–	6	3	–	9
West Division
Louisiana Tech x	7	–	1	9	–	5
Rice	5	–	3	8	–	5
UTEP	5	–	3	7	–	6
UTSA	3	–	5	4	–	8
North Texas	2	–	6	4	–	8
Southern Miss	1	–	7	3	–	9
Championship: Marshall 26, Louisiana Tech 23
$ – Conference champion; x – Division champion/co-champions; * Ineligible for postseason bowl due to transition from FCS; As of 22:24, 20 December 2014 (UTC); Rankings from AP Poll

The 2014 Louisiana Tech Bulldogs football team represented Louisiana Tech University in the 2014 NCAA Division I FBS football season. They were led by second-year head coach Skip Holtz and played their home games at Joe Aillet Stadium in Ruston, Louisiana. They were in their second season as a member of Conference USA, competing in the West Division. They finished the season 9–5, 7–1 in C-USA play to win the West Division title. As West Division Champions, they played East Division Champion Marshall in the C-USA Championship Game, losing to the Thundering Herd 23–26. They were invited to the Heart of Dallas Bowl where they defeated Illinois.

== Schedule ==
Date	Time	Opponent	Site	TV	Result	Attendance
August 30	6:00 pm	at No. 4 Oklahoma*	Gaylord Family Oklahoma Memorial Stadium; Norman, OK	PPV	L 16–48	85,063
September 6	6:00 pm	at Louisiana–Lafayette*	Cajun Field; Lafayette, LA	ESPN3	W 48–20	25,607
September 11	7:00 pm	at North Texas	Apogee Stadium; Denton, TX	CBSSN	W 42–21	16,998
September 20	6:00 pm	Northwestern State*	Joe Aillet Stadium; Ruston, LA (rivalry)		L 27–30	26,004
September 27	3:00 pm	at No. 5 Auburn*	Jordan–Hare Stadium; Auburn, AL	SECN	L 17–45	87,451
October 4	6:00 pm	UTEP	Joe Aillet Stadium; Ruston, LA	FCS	W 55–3	18,157
October 18	11:00 am	UTSA	Joe Aillet Stadium; Ruston, LA	FSN	W 27–20	18,071
October 25	2:30 pm	at Southern Miss	M. M. Roberts Stadium; Hattiesburg, MS (Rivalry in Dixie)	ASN	W 31–20	23,343
November 1	2:00 pm	Western Kentucky^{†}	Joe Aillet Stadium; Ruston, LA	FSN	W 59–10	20,011
November 8	11:00 am	at UAB	Legion Field; Birmingham, AL	ASN	W 40–24	9,457
November 22	12:00 pm	at Old Dominion	Foreman Field; Norfolk, VA (Oyster Bowl)	FCS	L 27–30 ^{OT}	20,118
November 29	11:00 am	Rice	Joe Aillet Stadium; Ruston, LA	CBSSN	W 76–31	18,029
December 6	11:00 am	at Marshall	Joan C. Edwards Stadium; Huntington, WV (C-USA Championship Game)	ESPN2	L 23–26	23,711
December 26	12:00 pm	vs. Illinois*	Cotton Bowl; Dallas, TX (Heart of Dallas Bowl)	ESPN	W 35–18	31,297
*Non-conference game; ^{†}Homecoming; Rankings from AP Poll released prior to the game; All times are in Central time

== Game summaries ==
=== Oklahoma ===
	1	2	3	4	Total
Bulldogs	0	3	0	13	16
#4 Sooners	21	10	10	7	48

=== Louisiana–Lafayette ===
	1	2	3	4	Total
Bulldogs	7	10	14	17	48
Ragin' Cajun	0	7	0	13	20

=== North Texas ===
	1	2	3	4	Total
Bulldogs	0	21	14	7	42
Mean Green	0	0	7	14	21

=== Northwestern State ===
	1	2	3	4	Total
Demons	0	3	7	20	30
Bulldogs	10	3	7	7	27

=== Auburn ===
	1	2	3	4	Total
Bulldogs	0	3	7	7	17
#5 Tigers	7	17	0	21	45

=== UTEP ===
	1	2	3	4	Total
Miners	0	3	0	0	3
Bulldogs	7	21	20	7	55

=== UTSA ===
	1	2	3	4	Total
Roadrunners	3	7	0	10	20
Bulldogs	0	6	21	0	27

=== Southern Miss ===
	1	2	3	4	Total
Bulldogs	0	3	14	14	31
Golden Eagles	7	0	3	10	20

=== WKU ===
	1	2	3	4	Total
Hilltoppers	7	3	0	0	10
Bulldogs	10	21	21	7	59

=== UAB ===
	1	2	3	4	Total
Bulldogs	14	10	6	10	40
Blazers	3	7	7	7	24

=== Old Dominion ===
	1	2	3	4	OT	Total
Bulldogs	7	17	0	0	3	27
Monarchs	0	14	3	7	6	30

=== Rice ===
	1	2	3	4	Total
Owls	3	14	7	7	31
Bulldogs	21	7	28	20	76

=== Marshall ===
	1	2	3	4	Total
Bulldogs	10	7	6	0	23
Thundering Herd	0	13	3	10	26

=== Illinois–Heart of Dallas Bowl ===
	1	2	3	4	Total
Fighting Illini	3	6	6	3	18
Bulldogs	14	7	0	14	35
