= Toledo Rockets football statistical leaders =

The Toledo Rockets football statistical leaders are individual statistical leaders of the Toledo Rockets football program in various categories, including passing, rushing, receiving, total offense, defensive stats, and kicking. Within those areas, the lists identify single-game, single-season, and career leaders. The Rockets represent the University of Toledo in the NCAA's Mid-American Conference.

Although Toledo began competing in intercollegiate football in 1916, the school's official record book considers the "modern era" to have begun in 1951. Records from before this year are often incomplete and inconsistent, and they are generally not included in these lists.

These lists are dominated by more recent players for several reasons:

- Since 1951, seasons have increased from 10 games to 11 and then 12 games in length.
- The NCAA didn't allow freshmen to play varsity football until 1972 (with the exception of the World War II years), allowing players to have four-year careers.
- Bowl games only began counting toward single-season and career statistics in 2002. The Rockets have played in nine bowl games since this decision, giving many recent players an extra game to accumulate statistics.
- Similarly, the Rockets have appeared in the MAC Football Championship Game five times since it first began in 1997.

These lists are updated through the end of the 2025 season.

== Passing ==
=== Passing yards ===
Career
Rk	Player	Yards	Years
1	Logan Woodside	10,514	2013 2014 2016 2017
2	Bruce Gradkowski	9,225	2002 2003 2004 2005
3	Terrance Owens	8,203	2010 2011 2012 2013
4	Gene Swick	7,266	1972 1973 1974 1975
5	Dequan Finn	7,070	2019 2020 2021 2022 2023
6	Ryan Huzjak	6,926	1993 1994 1995 1996
7	Aaron Opelt	6,804	2006 2007 2008 2009
8	Tucker Gleason	6,659	2021 2022 2023 2024 2025
9	Kevin Meger	6,023	1989 1990 1991 1992
10	Chris Wallace	5,454	1995 1996 1997 1998

Single season
Rk	Player	Yards	Year
1	Logan Woodside	4,129	2016
2	Logan Woodside	3,882	2017
3	Bruce Gradkowski	3,518	2004
4	Brian Jones	3,446	2002
5	Bruce Gradkowski	3,210	2003
6	Phillip Ely	2,965	2015
7	Chris Wallace	2,955	1997
8	Tucker Gleason	2,793	2024
9	Terrance Owens	2,705	2012
10	Dequan Finn	2,657	2023

Single game
Rk	Player	Yards	Year	Opponent
1	Logan Woodside	505	2016	BYU
2	Bruce Gradkowski	461	2003	Pittsburgh
	Dequan Finn	461	2021	Eastern Michigan
4	Logan Woodside	458	2017	Tulsa
5	Bruce Gradkowski	455	2004	Ball State
6	Logan Woodside	438	2016	Ohio
7	Bruce Gradkowski	435	2003	Buffalo
8	Carter Bradley	432	2020	Northern Illinois
9	John Alan Richter	429	2026	Temple
10	Aaron Opelt	423	2009	Purdue

=== Passing touchdowns ===
Career
Rk	Player	TDs	Years
1	Logan Woodside	93	2013 2014 2016 2017
2	Bruce Gradkowski	85	2002 2003 2004 2005
3	Terrance Owens	63	2010 2011 2012 2013
	Dequan Finn	63	2019 2020 2021 2022 2023
5	Tucker Gleason	57	2021 2022 2023 2024 2025
6	Ryan Huzjak	52	1993 1994 1995 1996
7	Aaron Opelt	46	2006 2007 2008 2009
8	Chuck Ealey	45	1969 1970 1971
9	Chris Wallace	44	1995 1996 1997
10	Gene Swick	43	1972 1973 1974 1975

Single season
Rk	Player	TDs	Year
1	Logan Woodside	45	2016
2	Bruce Gradkowski	29	2003
	Bruce Gradkowski	29	2005
4	Logan Woodside	28	2017
5	Bruce Gradkowski	27	2004
	Chris Wallace	27	1997
7	Tucker Gleason	24	2024
8	Brian Jones	23	2002
	Phillip Ely	23	2015
	Dequan Finn	23	2022

Single game
Rk	Player	TDs	Year	Opponent
1	Dequan Finn	6	2022	Kent State
	Logan Woodside	6	2017	Tulsa
	Bruce Gradkowski	6	2003	Buffalo
	Bruce Gradkowski	6	2004	Ball State
4	Chris Wallace	5	1997	Bowling Green
	Chris Wallace	5	1998	Western Michigan
	Bruce Gradkowski	5	2005	UTEP
	Aaron Opelt	5	2009	Ball State
	Austin Dantin	5	2011	Northern Illinois
	Austin Dantin	5	2012	Akron
	Logan Woodside	5	2014	Eastern Michigan
	Phillip Ely	5	2015	Massachusetts
	Logan Woodside	5	2016	BYU

== Rushing ==
=== Rushing yards ===
Career
Rk	Player	Yards	Years
1	Kareem Hunt	4,945	2013 2014 2015 2016
2	Chester Taylor	4,849	1998 1999 2000 2001
3	Wasean Tait	4,338	1993 1994 1995 1996 1998
4	Bryant Koback	4,026	2018 2019 2020 2021
5	Terry Swanson	3,601	2014 2015 2016 2017
6	Trinity Dawson	3,474	2002 2003 2004 2005
7	David Fluellen	3,336	2010 2011 2012 2013
8	Jalen Parmele	3,119	2004 2005 2006 2007
9	Casey McBeth	2,719	1991 1992 1993 1994
10	DaJuane Collins	2,588	2006 2007 2008 2009

Single season
Rk	Player	Yards	Year
1	Wasean Tait	2,090	1995
2	Kareem Hunt	1,631	2014
3	Chester Taylor	1,620	2001
4	Kelvin Farmer	1,532	1986
5	Jalen Parmele	1,511	2007
6	David Fluellen	1,498	2012
7	Kareem Hunt	1,475	2016
8	Chester Taylor	1,470	2000
9	Bryant Koback	1,400	2021
	Peny Boone	1,400	2023

Single game
Rk	Player	Yards	Year	Opponent
1	Morgan Williams	330	2008	Miami (Ohio)
2	Casey McBeth	304	1994	Akron
3	Asa Jenkins	289	1951	Davis & Elkins
4	Kareem Hunt	271	2014	Arkansas State
5	Kareem Hunt	265	2014	Bowling Green
6	Bryant Koback	259	2019	Eastern Michigan
7	Jalen Parmele	241	2007	Ohio
8	Emerson Cole	230	1949	North Dakota
	Chester Taylor	230	2000	Northern Illinois
10	David Fluellen	228	2012	Buffalo
	Bryant Koback	228	2019	Colorado State

=== Rushing touchdowns ===
Career
Rk	Player	TDs	Years
1	Chester Taylor	56	1998 1999 2000 2001
2	Bryant Koback	45	2018 2019 2020 2021
3	Kareem Hunt	44	2013 2014 2015 2016
4	Wasean Tait	38	1993 1994 1995 1996 1998
5	Joe Schwartz	35	1970 1971 1972
6	Roland Moss	32	1966 1967 1968

Single season
Rk	Player	TDs	Year
1	Wasean Tait	24	1995
2	Chester Taylor	21	2001
3	Joe Schwartz	18	1971
	Chester Taylor	18	2000
5	Kelvin Farmer	16	1986
	Kareem Hunt	16	2014

Single game
Rk	Player	TDs	Year	Opponent
1	Gib Stick	5	1923	Findlay
	Joe Schwartz	5	1971	Kent State
	Kareem Hunt	5	2014	Arkansas State
	Shakif Seymour	5	2017	Bowling Green

== Receiving ==
=== Receptions ===
Career
Rk	Player	Rec	Years
1	Eric Page	306	2009 2010 2011
2	Stephen Williams	229	2006 2007 2008 2009
3	Lance Moore	222	2001 2002 2003 2004
4	Steve Odom	216	2003 2004 2005 2006
5	Junior Vandeross III	215	2022 2023 2024 2025
6	Jerjuan Newton	206	2019 2020 2021 2022 2023 2024
7	Alonzo Russell	202	2012 2013 2014 2015
8	Bernard Reedy	195	2010 2011 2012 2013
9	Corey Jones	190	2013 2014 2015 2016
10	Dontà Greene	188	1999 2000 2001 2002

Single season
Rk	Player	Rec	Year
1	Eric Page	125	2011
2	Lance Moore	103	2003
3	Eric Page	99	2010
4	Lance Moore	90	2004
5	Bernard Reedy	88	2012
6	Junior Vandeross III	85	2024
7	Eric Page	82	2009
	Junior Vandeross III	82	2025
9	Don Fair	81	1970
10	Carl Ford	79	2002
	Stephen Williams	79	2009

Single game
Rk	Player	Rec	Year	Opponent
1	Nick Moore	20	2008	Michigan
2	Eric Page	16	2011	Ball State
3	Lance Moore	15	2003	Pittsburgh
	Stephen Williams	15	2007	Buffalo
	Stephen Williams	15	2009	Purdue
6	John Ross	14	1974	Tampa
	Eric Page	14	2010	Kent State
	Eric Page	14	2011	Syracuse
9	Jeff Calabrese	13	1972	Miami
	Marcus Goodwin	13	1992	Purdue
	Lance Moore	13	2003	CMU
	Chris Hopkins	13	2006	Iowa St.
	Eric Page	13	2011	Air Force
	Bernard Reedy	13	2013	Ball St.

=== Receiving yards ===
Career
Rk	Player	Yards	Years
1	Eric Page	3,446	2009 2010 2011
2	Cody Thompson	3,312	2014 2015 2016 2017 2018
3	Stephen Williams	3,102	2006 2007 2008 2009
4	Alonzo Russell	3,076	2012 2013 2014 2015
5	Jerjuan Newton	2,927	2019 2020 2021 2022 2023 2024
6	Lance Moore	2,776	2001 2002 2003 2004
7	Bernard Reedy	2,743	2010 2011 2012 2013
8	Junior Vandeross III	2,647	2022 2023 2024 2025
9	Steve Odom	2,631	2003 2004 2005 2006
10	Jon'Vea Johnson	2,265	2015 2016 2017 2018

Single season
Rk	Player	Yards	Year
1	Diontae Johnson	1,278	2017
2	Cody Thompson	1,269	2016
3	Lance Moore	1,194	2003
4	Lance Moore	1,189	2004
5	Eric Page	1,182	2011
6	Stephen Williams	1,169	2007
7	Eric Page	1,159	2009
8	Bernard Reedy	1,113	2012
9	Eric Page	1,105	2010
10	Stephen Williams	1,065	2009

Single game
Rk	Player	Yards	Year	Opponent
1	Bernard Reedy	237	2012	Eastern Michigan
2	Kenny Higgins	233	2004	Ball State
3	Stephen Williams	231	2009	Ball State
4	Jeff Calabrese	203	1972	Miami
5	Lance Moore	195	2003	Buffalo
6	Junior Vandeross III	194	2024	Pittsburgh
7	Stephen Williams	185	2009	Purdue
8	Jon'Vea Johnson	182	2016	BYU
9	Jeff Hepinstall	181	1975	Western Carolina
	Capus Robinson	181	1983	Kent State

=== Receiving touchdowns ===
Career
Rk	Player	TDs	Years
1	Jerjuan Newton	32	2019 2020 2021 2022 2023 2024
2	Cody Thompson	30	2014 2015 2016 2017 2018
3	Lance Moore	25	2001 2002 2003 2004
	Eric Page	25	2009 2010 2011
	Jon'Vea Johnson	25	2015 2016 2017 2018
6	Alonzo Russell	24	2012 2013 2014 2015
7	Bernard Reedy	23	2010 2011 2012 2013
	Diontae Johnson	23	2015 2016 2017 2018
9	Michael Roberts	22	2013 2014 2015 2016
10	Mel Long, Jr.	21	1997 1998 1999 2000
	Stephen Williams	21	2006 2007 2008 2009

Single season
Rk	Player	TDs	Year
1	Michael Roberts	16	2016
2	Lance Moore	14	2004
3	Diontae Johnson	13	2017
4	Cody Thompson	11	2016
	Jerjuan Newton	11	2024
	Junior Vandeross III	11	2025
7	Eric Page	10	2011
	Jon'Vea Johnson	10	2016
	Cody Thompson	10	2018
10	Don Seymour	9	1973
	Carl Ford	9	2002
	Lance Moore	9	2003
	Bernard Reedy	9	2011
	Jon'Vea Johnson	9	2018
	Jerjuan Newton	9	2022
	Jerjuan Newton	9	2023
	Anthony Torres	9	2024

Single game
Rk	Player	TDs	Year	Opponent
1	Eric Page	5	2011	Northern Illinois
2	Cody Thompson	4	2016	Central Michigan
3	Lance Moore	3	2003	Buffalo
	Kenny Higgins	3	2004	Ball State
	Lance Moore	3	2004	Western Michigan
	Chris Hopkins	3	2006	Iowa State
	Nick Moore	3	2007	Northern Illinois
	Bernard Reedy	3	2011	Air Force
	Jon'Vea Johnson	3	2016	BYU
	Michael Roberts	3	2016	Bowling Green
	Michael Roberts	3	2016	Western Michigan
	Jerjuan Newton	3	2023	Western Michigan

== Total offense ==
Total offense is the sum of passing and rushing statistics. It does not include receiving or returns.

=== Total offense yards ===
Career
Rk	Player	Yards	Years
1	Logan Woodside	10,602	2013 2014 2016 2017
2	Bruce Gradkowski	10,243	2002 2003 2004 2005
3	Dequan Finn	8,907	2019 2020 2021 2022 2023
4	Ryan Huzjak	8,465	1993 1994 1995 1996
5	Gene Swick	8,083	1972 1973 1974 1975
6	Tucker Gleason	7,396	2021 2022 2023 2024 2025
7	Aaron Opelt	7,341	2006 2007 2008 2009

Single season
Rk	Player	Yards	Year
1	Logan Woodside	4,089	2016
2	Logan Woodside	3,916	2017
3	Brian Jones	3,860	2002
4	Bruce Gradkowski	3,714	2003
5	Bruce Gradkowski	3,709	2004

Single game
Rk	Player	Yards	Year	Opponent
1	Logan Woodside	500	2016	BYU
2	Bruce Gradkowski	489	2003	Pittsburgh
3	Carter Bradley	476	2020	Northern Illinois
4	Bruce Gradkowski	475	2003	Buffalo
5	Dequan Finn	458	2021	Eastern Michigan
6	Logan Woodside	457	2017	Tulsa
7	Logan Woodside	452	2016	Ohio

=== Total touchdowns ===
Career
Rk	Player	TDs	Years
1	Bruce Gradkowski	99	2002 2003 2004 2005
2	Logan Woodside	97	2013 2014 2016 2017
3	Dequan Finn	88	2019 2020 2021 2022 2023
4	Tucker Gleason	71	2021 2022 2023 2024 2025
5	Ryan Huzjak	67	1993 1994 1995 1996
6	Aaron Opelt	63	2006 2007 2008 2009
7	Gene Swick	62	1972 1973 1974 1975

Single season
Rk	Player	TDs	Year
1	Logan Woodside	45	2016
2	Bruce Gradkowski	36	2004
3	Bruce Gradkowski	33	2005
4	Dequan Finn	32	2022
5	Tucker Gleason	31	2024
6	Bruce Gradkowski	30	2003
7	Chris Wallace	29	1997
	Logan Woodside	29	2017
	Dequan Finn	29	2023

== Defense ==
=== Interceptions ===
Career
Rk	Player	Ints	Years
1	Gary Hinkson	18	1969 1970 1971
2	Mark Brandon	17	1981 1982 1983 1984
3	Brandon Hefflin	16	2000 2001 2002 2003
4	Curtis Johnson	14	1967 1968 1969
5	Thomas Duncan	12	1968 1969 1970
	Dexter Clark	12	1983 1984 1985 1986

Single season
Rk	Player	Ints	Year
1	Mark Brandon	9	1983
2	Curtis Johnson	7	1969
	Gary Hinkson	7	1970
	Scott Resseguie	7	1974
	Mark Brandon	7	1984

Single game
Rk	Player	Ints	Year	Opponent
1	Gerry Palmer	4	1950	Western Reserve
	Quinyon Mitchell	4	2022	Northern Illinois
3	Herb Eldridge	3	1950	Bradley
	Gary Hinkson	3	1970	Marshall
	Steve Banks	3	1971	East Carolina
	Mark Brandon	3	1984	Ball State
	Bryant Jones	3	1985	Kent State

=== Tackles ===
Career
Rk	Player	Tackles	Years
1	Aaron Bivins	508	1975 1976 1977
2	Joe Conroy	490	1974 1976 1977 1978
3	Jack Laraway	459	1978 1979 1980 1981
	Tim Inglis	459	1983 1984 1985 1986
5	Doug Williams	427	1977 1978 1979
6	Dan Molls	422	2009 2010 2011 2012
7	Clayton Moore	414	1981 1982 1983 1984
8	Archie Donald	412	2006 2008 2009 2010
9	Marin Russell	408	1979 1980 1981 1982

Single season
Rk	Player	Tackles	Year
1	Barry Sneed	240	1964
2	Lee Emery	207	1964
3	Ed Scott	204	1973
4	John Niezgoda	201	1969
5	Larry Macek	200	1975
6	Ed Scott	195	1974
7	Doug Williams	190	1978
	Jim Gant	190	1993
9	Aaron Bivins	186	1976

Single game
Rk	Player	Tackles	Year	Opponent
1	Jim Walser	29	1976	Marshall
2	Larry Macek	28	1975	Northern Illinois
3	Ed Scott	26	1973	Bowling Green
	Aaron Bivins	26	1977	Ball State
	Darrell Mossburg	26	1992	Central Michigan
6	Willie Duke	24	1972	Kent State
	Mike Kennedy	24	1977	Central Michigan
8	Aaron Bivins	23	1976	Ball State
	Jack Laraway	23	1980	Bowling Green

=== Sacks ===
Career
Rk	Player	Sacks	Years
1	Bob Beemer	31.0	1982 1983 1984 1985
2	Dan Williams	28.0	1990 1991 1992
3	Kevin Rollins	25.0	1997 1998 1999 2000
	DeJuan Goulde	25.0	1998 1999 2000
5	Jamal Hines	23.0	2018 2019 2020 2021 2022
6	Mike Alston	21.5	2003 2004 2005 2006
7	Maurice Bulls	16.0	1991 1992 1993
	Marcus Matthews	16.0	1994 1995 1996 1997
	Jayrone Elliott	16.0	2010 2011 2012 2013
10	Marcus Amick	15.0	1987 1988 1989 1990
	Frank Ofili	15.0	2000 2001 2002 2003

Single season
Rk	Player	Sacks	Year
1	Bob Beemer	13.0	1985
	Dan Williams	13.0	1992
3	Andrew Zock	12.5	2026
4	Kevin Rollins	11.0	1999
5	Bob Beemer	10.0	1983
	Dan Williams	10.0	1990
	DeJuan Goulde	10.0	1999
	Kevin Rollins	10.0	2000
	Jamal Hines	10.0	2021
10	Mike Alston	9.5	2005

Single game
Rk	Player	Sacks	Year	Opponent
1	Bob Beemer	5.0	1985	Kent State
2	Ray Turner	4.0	2003	Western Michigan
	Kevin Rollins	4.0	1999	Ball State

== Kicking ==
=== Field goals made ===
Career
Rk	Player	FGs	Years
1	Jameson Vest	72	2015 2016 2017 2018
2	Rusty Hanna	68	1989 1990 1991 1992
3	Jeremiah Detmer	65	2011 2012 2013 2014
4	Todd France	59	1998 1999 2000 2001
5	Bruce Nichols	50	1985 1986 1987 1988
6	Alex Steigerwald	48	2006 2007 2008 2009

Single season
Rk	Player	FGs	Year
1	Jameson Vest	25	2017
2	Jeremiah Detmer	24	2012
3	Rusty Hanna	21	1992
4	Jeremiah Detmer	19	2013
	Jameson Vest	19	2015
6	Rusty Hanna	18	1990
	Todd France	18	1999

Single game
Rk	Player	FGs	Year	Opponent
1	Rusty Hanna	6	1992	Northern Illinois
2	Rusty Hanna	5	1989	Ball State
	Todd France	5	2000	Eastern Illinois
	Jeremiah Detmer	5	2012	Cincinnati

=== Field goal percentage ===
Career
Rk	Player	FG%	Years
1	Jeremiah Detmer	84.4%	2011 2012 2013 2014
2	Alex Steigerwald	82.8%	2006 2007 2008 2009
3	Jason Robbins	82.6%	2002 2003 2004 2005
4	Luke Pawlak	82.4%	2022 2023
5	Tony Lee	78.4%	1980 1981 1982 1983
6	Jameson Vest	75.0%	2015 2016 2017 2018
7	Dylan Cunanan	72.7%	2024 2025
8	Bruce Nichols	71.4%	1985 1986 1987 1988
	Thomas Cluckey	71.4%	2019 2020 2021 2022

Single season
Rk	Player	FG%	Year
1	Jason Robbins	100.0%	2005
	Alex Steigerwald	100.0%	2007
3	Jeremiah Detmer	95.0%	2013
4	Jason Robbins	90.0%	2004
5	Bruce Nichols	88.2%	1988
