= 2014 Mid-American Conference football season =

- League: NCAA Division I FBS
- Sport: Football
- Duration: August 2014 – December 2014
- Teams: 13

Regular season
- Season MVP: Jarvion Franklin
- Eastern Division champions: Bowling Green
- Western Division champions: Northern Illinois, Toledo

Championship Game
- Champions: Northern Illinois
- Runners-up: Bowling Green

Football seasons
- 2013 2015

2014 Mid-American Conference football standings
	Conf.			Overall
Team	W		L	W		L
East Division
Bowling Green x	5	–	3	8	–	6
Ohio	4	–	4	6	–	6
Buffalo	3	–	4	5	–	6
Akron	3	–	5	5	–	7
UMass	3	–	5	3	–	9
Miami (OH)	2	–	6	2	–	10
Kent State	1	–	6	2	–	9
West Division
Northern Illinois xy$	7	–	1	11	–	3
Toledo x	7	–	1	9	–	4
Western Michigan	6	–	2	8	–	5
Central Michigan	5	–	3	7	–	6
Ball State	4	–	4	5	–	7
Eastern Michigan	1	–	7	2	–	10
Championship: Northern Illinois 51, Bowling Green 17
$ – Conference champion; x – Division champion/co-champions; y – Championship game participant

The 2014 Mid-American Conference football season was the 69th season of college football play for the Mid-American Conference (MAC) and was a part of the 2014 NCAA Division I FBS football season.

== 2014 MAC Specialty Award Winners ==
Vern Smith Leadership Award Winner: OL Greg Mancz, Toledo
Coach of the Year: P. J. Fleck, Western Michigan
Offensive Player of the Year: RB Jarvion Franklin, Western Michigan
Defensive Player of the Year: DB Quinten Rollins, Miami
Special Teams Player of the Year: K Scott Secor, Ball State
Freshman of the Year: RB Jarvion Franklin, Western Michigan

== All-Conference teams ==
2014 All-MAC First Team Offense
Quarterback – Blake Frohnapfel, UMass
Offensive Linemen – Greg Mancz, Toledo
Offensive Linemen – Nick Beamish, Central Michigan
Offensive Lineman – Andy Phillips, Central Michigan
Offensive Lineman – Andrew Ness, Northern Illinois
Offensive Linemen – Tyler Loos, Northern Illinois
Tight End – Jean Sifrin, UMass
Wide Receiver – Tajae Sharpe, UMass
Wide Receiver – Titus Davis, Central Michigan
Wide Receiver – Corey Davis, Western Michigan
Wide Receiver – Roger Lewis, Bowling Green
Running Back – Jarvion Franklin, Western Michigan
Running Back – Kareem Hunt, Toledo
Placekicker – Scott Secor, Ball State

2014 All-MAC First Team Defense
Outside Linebacker – Jatavis Brown, Akron
Outside Linebacker – Junior Sylvestre, Toledo
Inside Linebacker – Justin Cherocci, Central Michigan
Inside Linebacker – Jovan Santos-Knox, UMass
Down Lineman – Jason Meehan, Northern Illinois
Down Lineman – L. T. Walton, Central Michigan
Down Lineman – Pat O’Connor, Eastern Michigan
Down Lineman – Cody Grice, Akron
Defensive Back – Quinten Rollins, Miami
Defensive Back – Nate Holley, Kent State
Defensive Back – Donald Celiscar, Western Michigan
Defensive Back – Paris Logan, Northern Illinois
Punter – Anthony Melchiori, Kent State

2014 All-MAC First Team Specialists
Kickoff Return Specialist – Eric Patterson, Ball State
Punt Return Specialist – Ryan Burbrink, Bowling Green

2014 All-MAC Second Team Offense
Quarterback – Zach Terrell, Western Michigan
Offensive Lineman – Alex Huettel, Bowling Green
Offensive Lineman – Willie Beavers, Western Michigan
Offensive Lineman – Josh Hendershot, Toledo
Offensive Lineman – Jake Silas, Buffalo
Offensive Lineman – Jeff Myers, Toledo
Tight End – Casey Pierce, Kent State
Wide Receiver – Da'Ron Brown, Northern Illinois
Wide Receiver – David Frazier, Miami
Wide Receiver – Corey Jones, Toledo
Wide Receiver – Jordan Williams-Lambert, Ball State
Running Back – Anthone Taylor, Buffalo
Running Back – Thomas Rawls, Central Michigan
Placekicker – Jeremiah Detmer, Toledo

2014 All-MAC Second Team Defense
Outside Linebacker – Gabe Martin, Bowling Green
Outside Linebacker – Adam Redden, Buffalo
Inside Linebacker – Boomer Mays, Northern Illinois
Inside Linebacker – Great Ibe, Eastern Michigan
Down Lineman – Orion Jones, Toledo
Down Lineman – Treyvon Hester, Toledo
Down Lineman – Cap Capi, Akron
Down Lineman – Perez Ford, Northern Illinois
Defensive Back – Randall Jette, UMass
Defensive Back – Nick Johnson, Bowling Green
Defensive Back – Jordan Haden, Toledo
Defensive Back – Dechane Durante, Northern Illinois
Punter – Zach Paul, Akron

2014 All-MAC Second Team Specialists
Kickoff Return Specialist – Devin Campbell, Buffalo
Punt Return Specialist – Daz Patterson, Ohio

2014 All-MAC Third Team Offense
Quarterback – Andrew Hendrix, Miami
Offensive Lineman – James Kristof, Western Michigan
Offensive Lineman – Lucas Powell, Ohio
Offensive Lineman – Jake Richard, Ball State
Offensive Lineman – Andre Davis, Buffalo
Offensive Lineman – Zach Lewis, Miami
Tight End – Tyreese Russell, Eastern Michigan
Wide Receiver – Daniel Braverman, Western Michigan
Wide Receiver – Alonzo Russell, Toledo
Wide Receiver – Ron Willoughby, Buffalo
Wide Receiver – KeVonn Mabon, Ball State
Running Back – Cameron Stingily, Northern Illinois
Running Back – Jahwan Edwards, Ball State
Placekicker – Tyler Tate, Bowling Green

2014 All-MAC Third Team Defense
Outside Linebacker – Jovon Johnson, Ohio
Outside Linebacker – Rasheen Lemon, Northern Illinois
Inside Linebacker – Stanley Andre, UMass
Inside Linebacker – Lee Skinner, Buffalo
Down Lineman – Bryan Thomas, Bowling Green
Down Lineman – Tarell Basham, Ohio
Down Lineman – Joe Ostman, Central Michigan
Down Lineman – Darnell Smith, Ball State
Defensive Back – Eric Patterson, Ball State
Defensive Back – Tony Annese, Central Michigan
Defensive Back – Ronald Zamort, Western Michigan
Defensive Back – Justin Currie, Western Michigan
Punter – J. Schroeder, Western Michigan

2014 All-MAC Third Team Specialists
Kickoff Return Specialist – Darius Phillips, Western Michigan
Punt Return Specialist – Fred McRae, Miami
