= Greg Mancz =

American football player (born 1992)

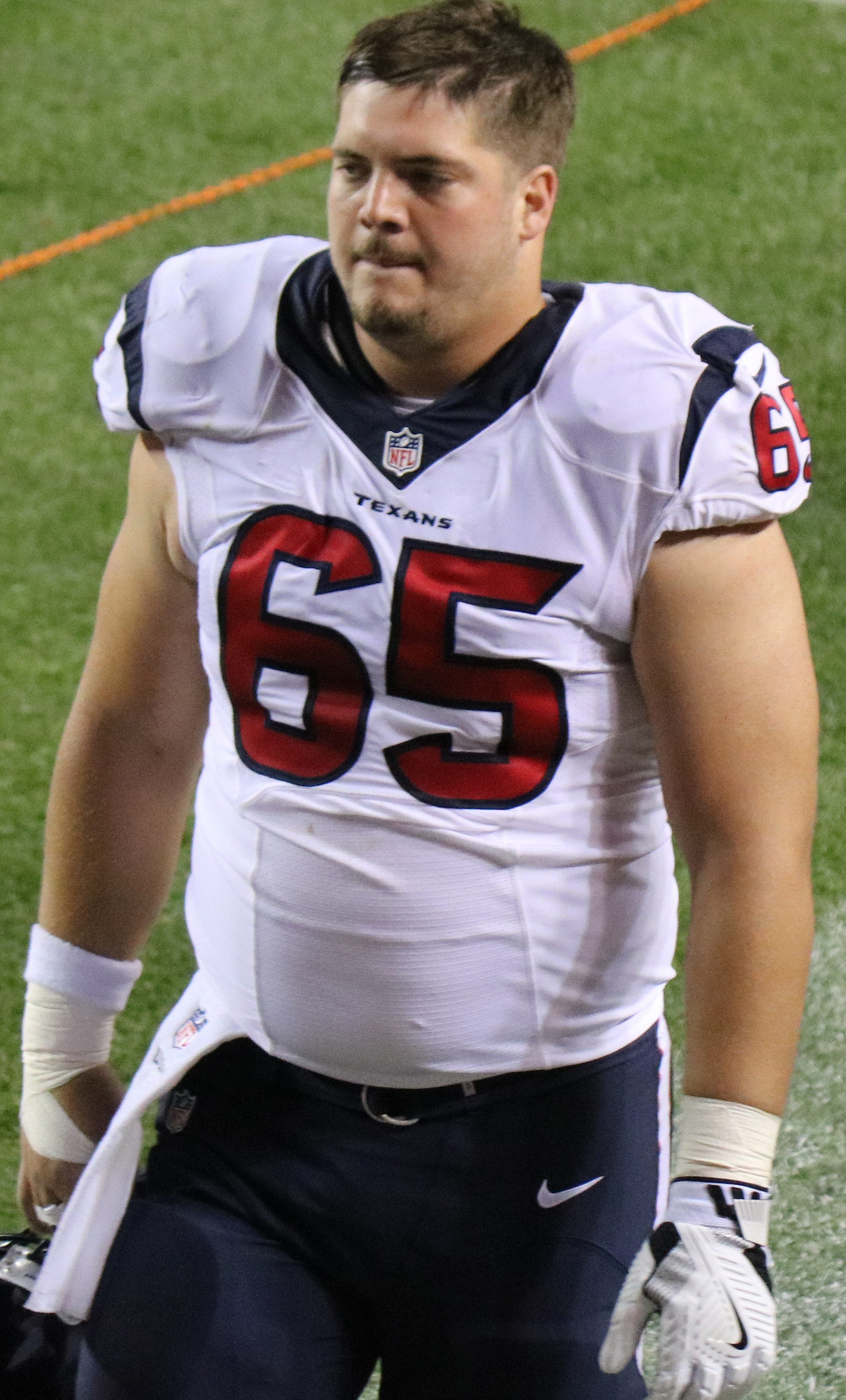
- Mancz with the Houston Texans in 2016

No. 65, 62, 69
- Positions: Center, guard

Personal information
- Born: April 23, 1992 (age 34); Cincinnati, Ohio, U.S.
- Listed height: 6 ft 4 in (1.93 m)
- Listed weight: 302 lb (137 kg)

Career information
- High school: Anderson (Cincinnati, Ohio)
- College: Toledo (2010–2014)
- NFL draft: 2015: undrafted

Career history
- Houston Texans (2015–2020); Baltimore Ravens (2020–2021)*; Miami Dolphins (2021); Buffalo Bills (2022); Cleveland Browns (2022); Minnesota Vikings (2022); Buffalo Bills (2022–2023)
- * Offseason or practice squad member only

Awards and highlights
- MAC Most Valuable Player (2014); Second-team All-American (2014); First-team All-MAC (2014); Second-team All-MAC (2013); Third-team All-MAC (2012)

Career NFL statistics
- Games played: 65
- Games started: 32
- Stats at Pro Football Reference

Gregory Brian Mancz (born April 23, 1992) is an American former professional football player who was an offensive lineman in the National Football League (NFL) from 2015 to 2022, primarily with the Houston Texans. He was lightly recruited out of high school in 2010 and ended up playing college football for the Toledo Rockets of the University of Toledo, where he was a four-year starter at several positions along the offensive line. He earned various All-American and All-Mid-American Conference (MAC) honors during his college career. His senior season in 2014, he won the Vern Smith Leadership Award, which is given to the best player in the MAC. Mancz went undrafted in the 2015 NFL draft and signed with the Texans shortly thereafter.

Due to a season-ending injury to Nick Martin, Mancz was the Texans' starting center for the entire 2016 season, becoming the first lineman in team history to start every game in a season. However, he mainly served in a backup role throughout the rest of his NFL career. Overall, Mancz played for the Texans from 2015 to 2020, the Miami Dolphins in 2021, the Buffalo Bills in 2022, and the Minnesota Vikings in 2022. He was also a member of the Baltimore Ravens and Cleveland Browns but did not appear in any games for either team. He was inducted into the University of Toledo's athletic hall of fame in 2020.

== Early life ==
Gregory Brian Mancz was born on April 23, 1992, in Cincinnati, Ohio. He played high school football at Anderson High School in Cincinnati and was a two-year starter. He played in the state championship game in 2007 and 2008, with Anderson High winning the title in 2007. Mancz played right tackle his junior season in 2008 and left tackle his senior season in 2009.

He earned first-team All-League, second-team All-Southwest District and honorable mention All-State honors as a senior in 2009 as the team finished the season with a 12–1 record. He was team captain his senior year as well. Mancz was also selected to play in the 2010 Ohio North-South All-Star Game and the 2010 Big 33 Classic.

In the class of 2010, he was rated a two-star recruit by Scout.com and a three-star recruit by Rivals.com. He committed to Toledo in January 2010. He also had offers from Air Force and Ohio.

== College career ==
Mancz played for the Toledo Rockets of the University of Toledo (UT) from 2011 to 2014 and started 48 games. He was redshirted in 2010.

=== 2011–2013 ===
Mancz started all 13 games at right guard in 2011. He was named a first-team Freshman All-American by Yahoo! Sports and a third-team Freshman All-American by Phil Steele. He also garnered honorable mention Academic All-Mid-American Conference (MAC) accolades and won the Cohen Freshman of the Year Award, which is given to Toledo football's "Freshman of the Year". He again started all 13 games in 2012, earning third-team All-MAC and Academic All-MAC honors.

In July 2013, Mancz was named a nominee for the Allstate AFCA Good Works Team, which recognizes college football players for their community service. He started 12 games in 2013, starting the first three games at right tackle before being moved back to right guard for the rest of the year. He earned second-team All-MAC and Academic All-MAC honors. He won the team's offensive Unsung Hero Award.

=== 2014 ===
Mancz moved to center for the 2014 season to replace the recently graduated Zac Kerin. In July 2014, Mancz was named to the watch lists for both the Rimington Trophy, which is given to the best center in college football, and the Lombardi Award, which is awarded to the best lineman or linebacker in college football. Also in July 2014, he was named a nominee for the Allstate AFCA Good Works Team for the second year in a row.

He started the first nine games of the regular season before missing the last three games due to a knee injury. Mancz then returned as a starter in the team's GoDaddy Bowl victory over Arkansas State. The Rockets finished the year with a 9–4 record, including the bowl victory. The Rockets offense led the MAC in scoring offense, total offense and rushing offense in 2014.

He was named a second-team All-American by the Football Writers Association of America (FWAA). He was the only player from the MAC to be named to the FWAA All-American team that year and was also the first Toledo player to be named an All-American since Eric Page in 2011. He also won the Vern Smith Leadership Award, which is given to the best player in the MAC. Mancz was the first offensive lineman to ever win the Vern Smith Leadership Award and the first Toledo player since Bruce Gradkowski in 2005 to win the award. He earned First-team All-MAC and Academic All-MAC honors as well. He also won Toledo football's Jim Nicholson Award, which is given to "the player contributing the most toward the success of the team". Mancz was a team captain in 2014 and was also made a permanent team captain.

He was a finalist for the 2014 Wuerffel Trophy, which is given to the college football player "who combines outstanding community service with athletic and academic achievement". He was also a semifinalist for the 2014 William V. Campbell Trophy, which is given to the best scholar-athlete in the nation. In May 2015, he received the MAC's Medal of Excellence Award, which is given annually to one male and one female member from the graduating class of each school in the conference.

Mancz accepted an invitation to play in the 2015 East-West Shrine Game as part of the West Team. However, he did not play in the game as he suffered a shoulder injury during the second day of Shrine Game practices.

He was inducted into the University of Toledo's athletic hall of fame in 2020.

== Professional career ==
=== Pre-draft ===
Pre-draft measurables
Height	Weight	Arm length	Hand span
6 ft 4 1/2 in (1.94 m)	301 lb (137 kg)	32 3/8 in (0.82 m)	10 in (0.25 m)
All values from NFL Combine

Mancz attended the 2015 NFL Combine but did not work out due to his January 2015 shoulder injury. He was rated the eighth best center in the 2015 NFL draft by NFLDraftScout.com. Lance Zierlein of NFL.com said that "Based on Mancz's tape and history, one would have to expect that he will find a way to succeed in the league." Zierlein projected him as a sixth or seventh round pick. Chris Burke of SI.com projected Mancz as a mid to late fifth round pick.

=== Houston Texans ===
Mancz signed with the Houston Texans on May 8, 2015, after going undrafted in the 2015 draft. He played in the first three games of the 2015 season but was inactive for the next five games. In late October, he suffered a knee injury that required surgery. He was placed on season-ending injured reserve on November 3. He was taken off injured reserve on February 8, 2016.

In August 2016, he became the team's starting center after a season-ending injury to Nick Martin. He started all 16 regular season games for the Texans in 2016, and also started the team's two playoff games. Mancz was the first lineman in team history to start every game in a season.

With Martin returning from injury in 2017, Mancz began the season as the team's primary backup along the interior of the offensive line. During the Week 1 game against the Jacksonville Jaguars on September 10, Mancz replaced starting left guard Xavier Su'a-Filo to begin the second half but was shifted to right guard after an injury to Jeff Allen. Mancz then started the Week 2 game against the Cincinnati Bengals on September 14 at right guard. On September 18, Texans head coach Bill O'Brien stated that Mancz would remain the starting right guard even if Allen was healthy. Mancz then started the Week 3 game against the New England Patriots on September 24. However, he missed the Week 4 game against the Tennessee Titans on October 1 due to a knee injury. On October 4, he returned to practice with a protective brace on his knee. From Weeks 5 to 12, Mancz only appeared in two games; a non-starting role in both Week 8 and Week 10. He then started the team's final five games of the season; the first three at right guard and the last two at center. Overall, Mancz played in 10 games, starting seven, in 2017.

On August 31, 2018, Mancz signed a two-year contract extension with the Texans through the 2020 season. Due to an injury to Senio Kelemete, he started the Week 3 game against the New York Giants at left guard. Mancz also started at right guard in Weeks 7, 8, and 14 due to injuries from Zach Fulton. Overall, Mancz played in all 16 games, starting four, in 2018. He also appeared in one playoff game.

Mancz suffered an ankle injury during the 2019 preseason that caused him to miss the first two games of the regular season. He started at right guard in Week 4 against the Carolina Panthers in place of the injured Zach Fulton, but suffered a concussion late in the game that caused him to miss the next five contests. Mancz then returned to play in the Texans' final seven games of the season, all in a non-starting role. Overall, he appeared in nine games, starting one, during the 2019 season. He also appeared in two playoff games. During the offseason, he underwent arthroscopic surgery for his ankle injury from the 2019 preseason.

On September 5, 2020, Mancz was released by the Texans and signed to the practice squad the next day. He was elevated to the active roster on November 7, November 14, November 21, and January 2, 2021, for the team's Weeks 9, 10, 11, and 17 games against the Jaguars, Cleveland Browns, Patriots, and Titans, and reverted to the practice squad after each game. Overall, he played in four games, starting none, during the 2020 season. Mancz was released from the practice squad on January 7, 2021.

=== Later career ===
On January 12, 2021, Mancz was signed to the practice squad of the Baltimore Ravens. On January 29, Mancz signed a reserve/futures contract with the Ravens.

On August 28, 2021, Mancz was traded to the Miami Dolphins, along with a 2022 seventh-round pick, in exchange for a 2022 sixth-round pick. He started the team's Week 4 game against the Indianapolis Colts after Michael Deiter was injured. Prior to the Week 5 game against the Tampa Bay Buccaneers, Mancz suffered a neck injury during practice but ended up starting the game anyway. He also started the team's Week 6 game but suffered a groin injury that caused him to miss the next game. He returned in Week 8 as the backup to Austin Reiter, playing two snaps on special teams. Mancz then started the Week 9 game against his former team, the Texans, but suffered an ankle injury and was replaced by Reiter after only playing nine snaps. He was placed on injured reserve on November 10. Mancz was later activated from injured reserve on December 18 but did not appear in any more games for the Dolphins in 2021. Overall, he played in five games, starting four, in 2021 and became a free agent after the season.

On March 21, 2022, Mancz signed with the Buffalo Bills. He was released on August 30, and signed to the practice squad the next day. On September 24, he was promoted to the active roster for the team's Week 3 game against Mancz's former team, the Dolphins. During the game, Mancz appeared in 23 snaps on offense and four snaps on specials teams in a non-starting role. He was moved back to the practice squad on September 27. He was released by the Bills on November 17.

On November 22, 2022, Mancz was signed to the Browns' active roster. He was released on December 23 without appearing in a game.

On January 3, 2023, the Minnesota Vikings signed Mancz to the active roster after losing Brian O'Neill and Austin Schlottmann to injury. He appeared in the team's Week 18 game against the Chicago Bears, playing seven snaps on special teams. He was released by the Vikings on January 14.

On January 19, 2023, the Bills signed Mancz to the practice squad. He signed a reserve/future contract on January 23. On August 29, Mancz was released by the Bills and re-signed to the practice squad the next day. He was not signed to a reserve/future contract after the 2023 season and thus became a free agent when his practice squad contract expired.

Overall, Mancz played in 65 regular season games, starting 32, during his NFL career. He also appeared in five postseason games, starting two.

== Personal life ==
While at the University of Toledo, Mancz spent time as the UT Student-Athlete Advisory Council (SAAC) president, the UT vice-president for Athletes in Action and the UT vice-president for the Fellowship of Christian Athletes. He also spent time on the UT Football Team Leadership Council, the UT Football Leadership Board and the MAC Student-Athlete Advisory Committee. He participated in numerous community service events while at UT. Mancz graduated from Toledo with a degree in finance.
