= Alonzo Russell =

Alonzo Russell may refer to:

- Alonzo Russell (sprinter)
- Alonzo Russell (American football)
