= Kareem Hunt =

American football player (born 1995)

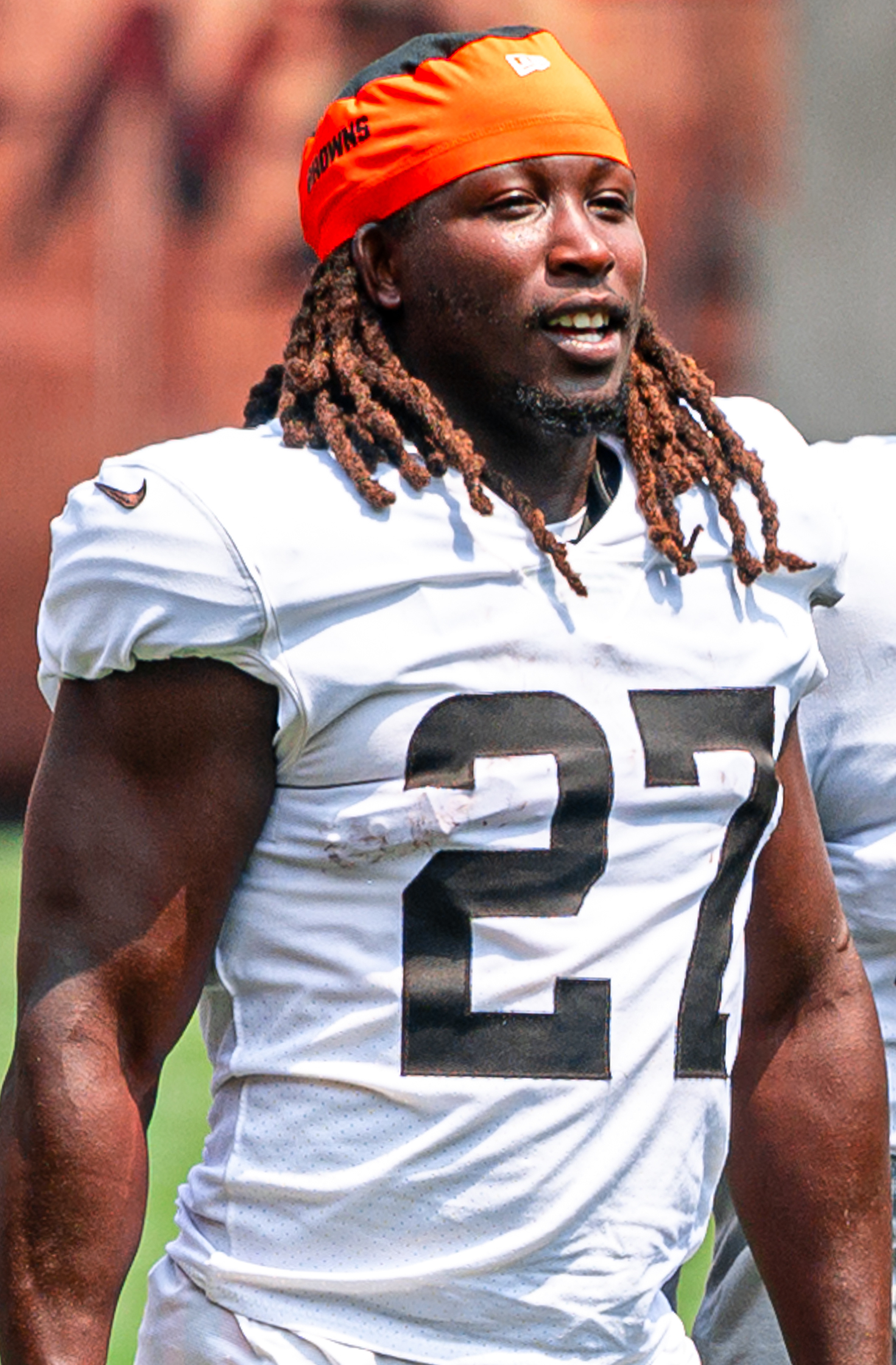
- Hunt with the Cleveland Browns in 2021

Profile
- Position: Running back

Personal information
- Born: August 6, 1995 (age 31); Elyria, Ohio, U.S.
- Listed height: 5 ft 11 in (1.80 m)
- Listed weight: 216 lb (98 kg)

Career information
- High school: South (Willoughby, Ohio)
- College: Toledo (2013–2016)
- NFL draft: 2017: 3rd round, 86th overall pick

Career history
- Kansas City Chiefs (2017–2018); Cleveland Browns (2019–2023); Kansas City Chiefs (2024–2025)

Awards and highlights
- Pro Bowl (2017); NFL rushing yards leader (2017); PFWA All-Rookie Team (2017); 2× First-team All-MAC (2014, 2016); Second-team All-MAC (2015)

Career NFL statistics as of 2025
- Rushing yards: 5,775
- Rushing average: 4.1
- Rushing touchdowns: 55
- Receptions: 267
- Receiving yards: 2,209
- Receiving touchdowns: 18
- Stats at Pro Football Reference

Kareem AJ Hunt (born August 6, 1995) is an American professional football running back. He played college football for the Toledo Rockets and was selected by the Chiefs in the third round of the 2017 NFL draft. Hunt also played for the Cleveland Browns.

== Early life ==
Hunt attended South High School in Willoughby, Ohio, where he played for the Rebels football team. Hunt rushed for 2,519 yards and 39 touchdowns as a junior and 2,685 yards and 44 touchdowns as a senior. He was rated by Rivals.com as a three-star recruit and committed to the University of Toledo to play college football.

== College career ==
As a freshman at Toledo in 2013, Hunt played in 12 games with three starts and rushed for 866 yards on 137 carries with six touchdowns. He had a strong four-game stretch in the season with 127 rushing yards and two touchdowns against Navy, 114 rushing yards and a touchdown against Bowling Green, 168 rushing yards and two rushing touchdowns against Eastern Michigan, and 186 rushing yards and a touchdown against Buffalo.

As a sophomore, Hunt played in 10 games, missing three due to injury. In the 10 games that he appeared in, Hunt rushed for at least 101 yards in all of them. He rushed for 1,631 yards on 205 carries with 16 touchdowns. Hunt was the MVP of the 2015 GoDaddy Bowl victory over Arkansas State after rushing for 271 yards and five touchdowns, which tied an NCAA record with Barry Sanders.

Hunt was suspended for the first two games of his junior year in 2015 due to a violation of team rules. Hunt returned for the third game, but was injured during the game and missed the next two games. Overall, in the 2015 season, he finished with 973 rushing yards and 12 rushing touchdowns.

In 2016, Hunt played all 13 games, leading the MAC in both rush attempts (262) and yards (1,475), including 200 rushing yards in the loss at #14 Western Michigan. His 4,945 career rushing yards broke Chester Taylor's school record, and was third all time in MAC conference history. Hunt also holds career school records for yards per rush (6.3, with a minimum of 100 rushes), and total yards from scrimmage (5,500).

== Professional career ==
Pre-draft measurables
Height	Weight	Arm length	Hand span	Wingspan	40-yard dash	10-yard split	20-yard split	20-yard shuttle	Three-cone drill	Vertical jump	Broad jump	Bench press
5 ft 10 1/2 in (1.79 m)	216 lb (98 kg)	31 3/8 in (0.80 m)	9 5/8 in (0.24 m)	6 ft 2 1/8 in (1.88 m)	4.60 s	1.58 s	2.66 s	4.53 s	7.22 s	36.5 in (0.93 m)	9 ft 11 in (3.02 m)	18 reps
All values from NFL Combine/Pro Day

=== Kansas City Chiefs (first stint) ===
==== 2017 season ====
Hunt was selected by the Kansas City Chiefs in the third round (86th overall) of the 2017 NFL draft. He was the sixth running back to be selected in the draft and was the first of three Toledo Rockets to be selected that year.

Following a knee injury to starting running back Spencer Ware in the Chiefs' third preseason game against the Seattle Seahawks, Hunt was named the starting running back for the Chiefs on August 27, 2017.

Hunt made his NFL debut on September 7, 2017, against the New England Patriots. On his first career NFL carry, despite never losing a fumble during his college career, Hunt fumbled, with the ball being recovered by the Patriots' safety Devin McCourty. Hunt went on to catch two touchdown passes — a three-yarder from quarterback Alex Smith late in the first half, and a 78-yarder in the fourth quarter — and punched in a four-yard rushing touchdown in the fourth en route to a 42–27 road victory. Hunt finished with 246 total yards from scrimmage (148 rushing, 98 receiving), the most ever in an NFL debut. He joined stars Marshall Faulk (for the Indianapolis Colts in 1994, 174 yards) and Billy Sims (for the Detroit Lions in 1980, 217 yards), as the only NFL players since 1970 to debut with over 150 scrimmage yards and three touchdowns. Hunt's 148 rushing yards led all NFL rushers for Week 1. He was named the AFC Offensive Player of the Month for the month of September after leading the NFL with 401 rushing yards, 538 yards from scrimmage, and 8.53 yards per carry. During a narrow Week 7 31–30 road loss to the Oakland Raiders, Hunt had 117 scrimmage yards for his seventh straight game accomplishing the feat.

On December 19, 2017, Hunt was named to the 2018 Pro Bowl as a rookie. Heading into Week 17, Hunt was third in the NFL in rushing yards behind Todd Gurley and Le'Veon Bell. Both Gurley and Bell were inactive for Week 17 after both teams clinched the playoffs and were resting their players, giving Hunt a chance to claim the rushing title. On his first and only carry of the game, Hunt rushed for a 35-yard touchdown, passing both Bell and Gurley, giving him the rushing yards title for the 2017 season with 1,327 yards. This marked the second season in a row where a rookie led the league in rushing (Ezekiel Elliott in 2016). Hunt was selected to the PFWA All-Rookie Team and named PFWA NFL Rookie of the Year. He was ranked 33rd on the NFL Top 100 Players of 2018.

The Chiefs finished atop the AFC West with a 10–6 record and qualified for the playoffs. During the Wild Card Round against the Tennessee Titans, Hunt rushed for 42 yards and a touchdown on 11 carries in the narrow 22–21 loss.

==== 2018 season ====
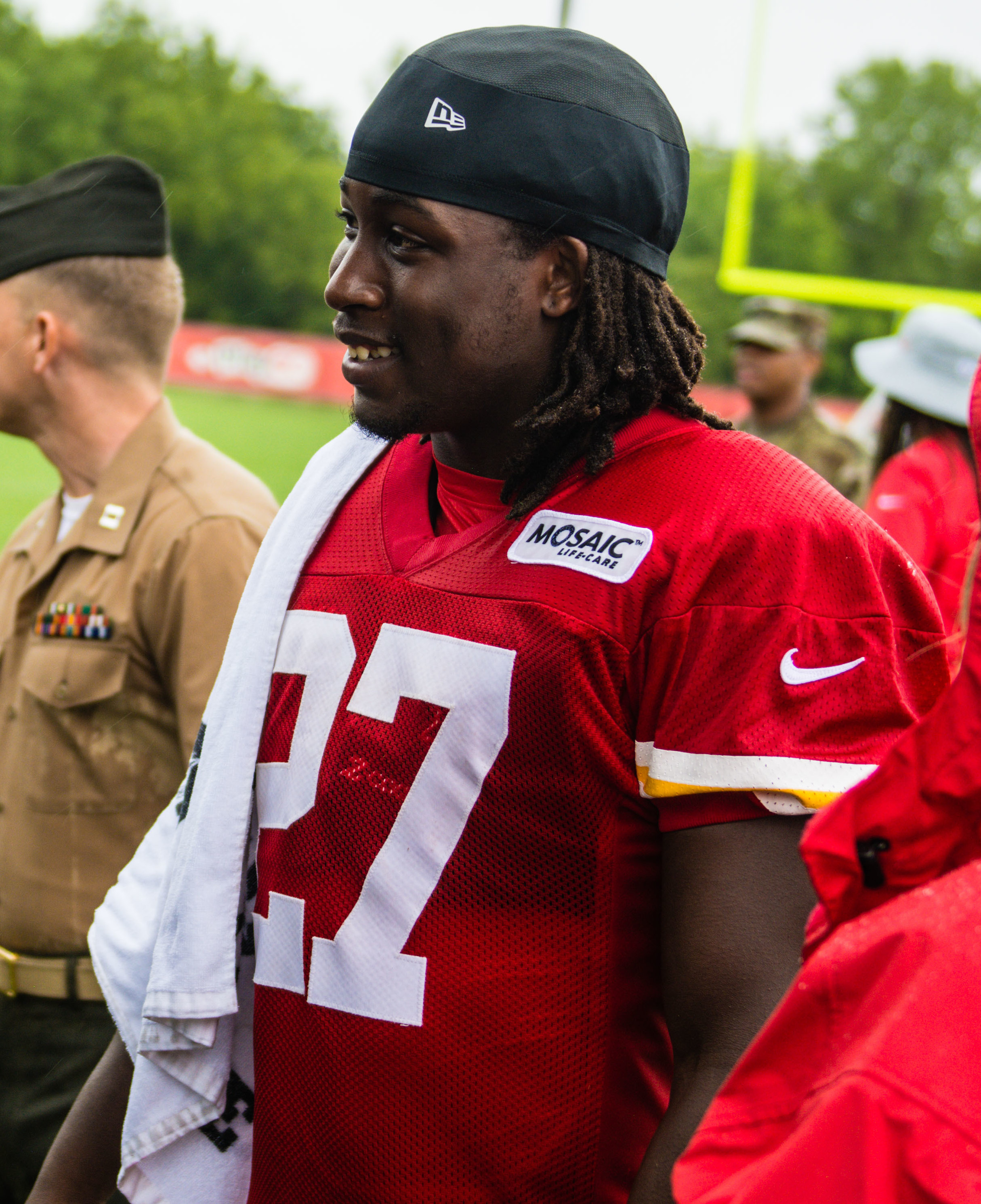
Hunt in 2018

Hunt remained the Chiefs' primary running back going into the 2018 season. During Week 3, he recorded his second career game with two rushing touchdowns in the 38–27 victory over the San Francisco 49ers. In the next game against the Denver Broncos, he rushed for 121 yards and a touchdown and caught three passes for 54 yards during the 27–23 road victory. On October 6, Hunt was fined $26,739 for a hit where he intentionally lowered his helmet.

During Week 6 against the Patriots, Hunt recorded 10 carries for 80 yards to go along with five receptions for 105 yards and a 67-yard touchdown in the 43–40 road loss. In the next game, a 45–10 victory over the Cincinnati Bengals, he rushed for 86 yards and a touchdown and had five receptions for 55 yards and two touchdowns. Hunt continued his momentum the following week against the Broncos, rushing for 50 yards and catching five passes for 36 yards and a touchdown during the 30–23 victory. During Week 9 against the Cleveland Browns, Hunt had 17 carries for 91 yards and two touchdowns to go along with a 50-yard touchdown reception in the 37–21 road victory. He was named AFC Offensive Player of the Week for his performance against the Browns. Two weeks later against the Los Angeles Rams, Hunt rushed for 70 yards and caught three passes for 41 yards and a touchdown in the 54–51 road loss.

On November 30, 2018, Hunt was released by the Chiefs after a videotape surfaced of him pushing a woman to the ground and then kicking her. Authorities declined to proceed with criminal charges after the woman stopped cooperating with authorities.

=== Cleveland Browns ===
==== 2019 season ====
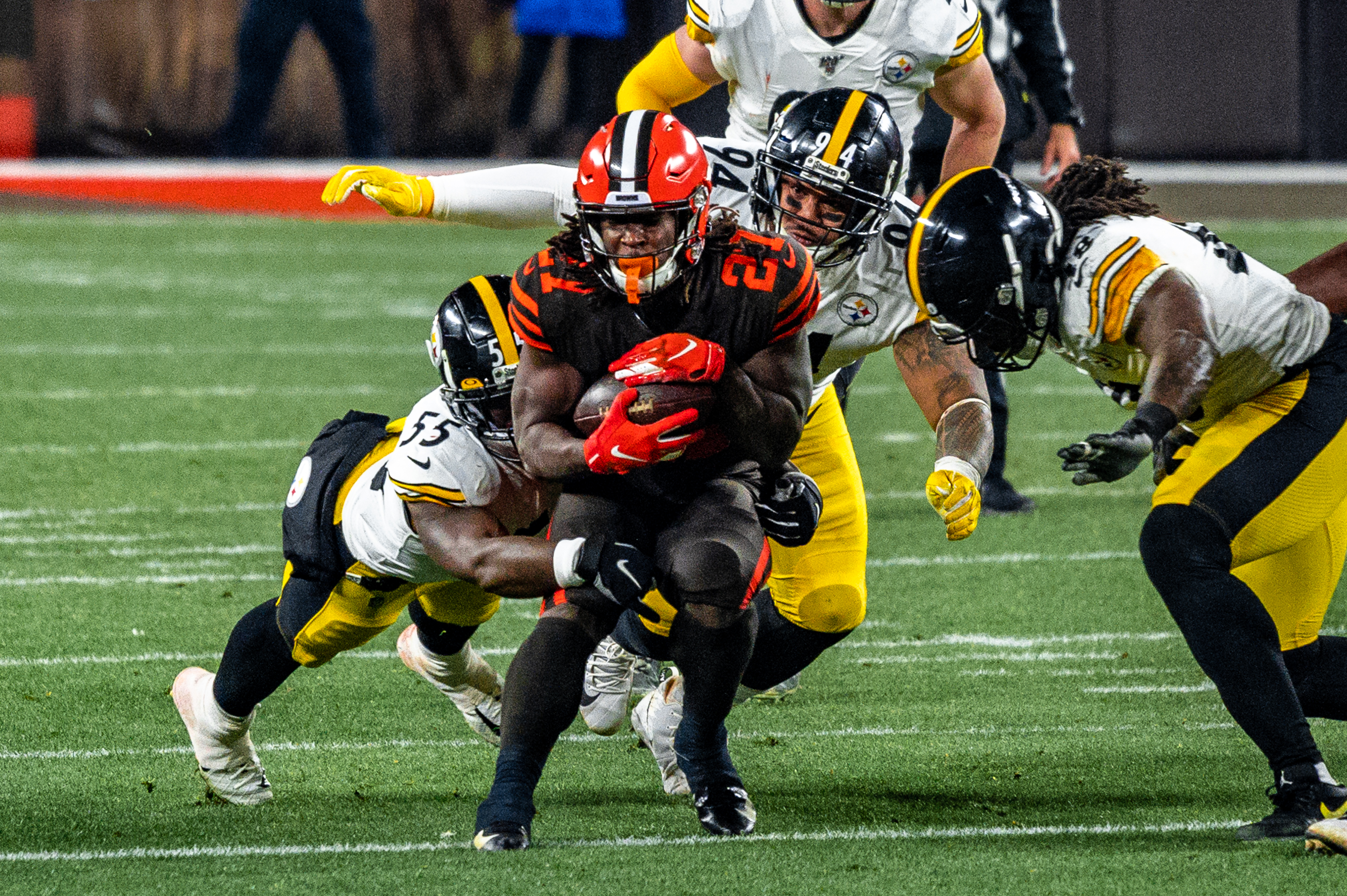
Hunt in 2019

Hunt was signed by the Cleveland Browns on February 11, 2019. Due to the pending investigation from the NFL into the assault allegations against him, Hunt was placed on the Commissioner’s Exempt list after signing his contract. On March 15, the NFL announced that Hunt had been suspended without pay for the first eight games of the 2019 season for violating the league's personal conduct policy. He was eligible to participate in all off-season workouts and all preseason games. Following the announcement, Hunt was added to the Browns' active roster. On August 29, Hunt underwent a sports hernia surgery; he was placed on the reserve/suspended list two days later. As part of the terms of his suspension, Hunt began practicing with the team again on October 21.

Hunt was reinstated from suspension on November 4. He made his Browns debut in Week 10 against the Buffalo Bills.

Hunt finished the 2019 season with 43 carries for 179 yards and two touchdowns to go along with 37 receptions for 285 yards and a touchdown in eight games and three starts.

==== 2020 season ====
On March 16, 2020, the Browns placed a second-round restricted free agent tender on Hunt. He signed the tender on April 20, 2020.

On September 8, 2020, the Browns signed Hunt to a two-year, $13.25 million contract extension. In Week 2 against the Bengals, he rushed 10 times for 86 yards and his first touchdown of the season and caught two passes for 15 yards and his first touchdown of the season during the 35–30 victory. Two weeks later against the Dallas Cowboys, Hunt recorded 11 carries for 71 yards and two touchdowns in the 49–38 road victory. During Week 10 against the Houston Texans, he had 19 carries for 104 yards in the 10–7 victory. During Week 14 against the Baltimore Ravens, Hunt recorded 110 scrimmage yards, a rushing touchdown, and a receiving touchdown during the 47–42 loss.

Hunt finished the 2020 season with 198 carries for 841 yards and six touchdowns to go along with 38 receptions for 304 yards and five touchdowns in 16 games and five starts. In the Wild Card Round against the Steelers, Hunt rushed for 48 yards and two touchdowns during the 48–37 road victory. During the Divisional Round, Hunt scored a rushing touchdown in the 22–17 road loss to his former team, the Chiefs.

==== 2021 season ====
Hunt entered the season as the backup to Nick Chubb. He suffered a calf injury in Week 6 and was placed on injured reserve on October 19, 2021. He was activated on November 27.

Hunt finished the 2021 season with 78 carries for 386 yards and four touchdowns to go along with 22 receptions for 174 yards in eight games and one start.

==== 2022 season ====
On August 7, 2022, Hunt requested a trade from the Browns, but the team declined his trade request. In Week 1, Hunt had a rushing touchdown and a receiving touchdown during a narrow 26–24 victory over the Carolina Panthers.

Hunt finished the 2022 season with 123 carries for 468 yards and three touchdowns to go along with 35 receptions for 210 yards and a touchdown in 17 games and no starts.

==== 2023 season ====
In August 2023, press outlets including ESPN reported that Hunt was visiting the New Orleans Saints and was expected to sign a contract. However, he left the facility without a deal and traveled to visit another team. On September 20, 2023, Hunt signed a one-year contract worth $4 million to return to the Browns following a season-ending injury to Chubb.

Hunt scored at least one touchdown per game (six total) from Weeks 6–10, despite being out touched by Jerome Ford and failing to amass 55 yards in any of the games.

Hunt finished the 2023 season with 135 carries for 411 yards and nine touchdowns in 15 games and two starts. He scored a rushing touchdown and a receiving touchdown in the Browns' Wild Card Round 45–14 road loss to the Texans.

=== Kansas City Chiefs (second stint) ===
==== 2024 season ====
On September 16, 2024, it was reported that Hunt would visit with the Kansas City Chiefs the next day after an injury to running back Isiah Pacheco in the Chiefs' Week 2 matchup against the Cincinnati Bengals. The next day, Hunt was signed to the Chiefs' practice squad, and promoted to the active roster a week later. In his second game back with the Chiefs, Hunt eclipsed the 100-yard rushing mark for the first time in four years, rushing 27 times for 102 yards and a touchdown in a 26–13 victory over the New Orleans Saints. He finished the 2024 season with 200 carries for 728 yards and seven touchdowns to go along with 23 receptions for 176 yards. Hunt scored a rushing touchdown in both the Chiefs' Divisional Round victory over the Texans and the AFC Championship victory over the Bills. Hunt had 14 scrimmage yards in the 40–22 loss to the Eagles during Super Bowl LIX.

==== 2025 season ====
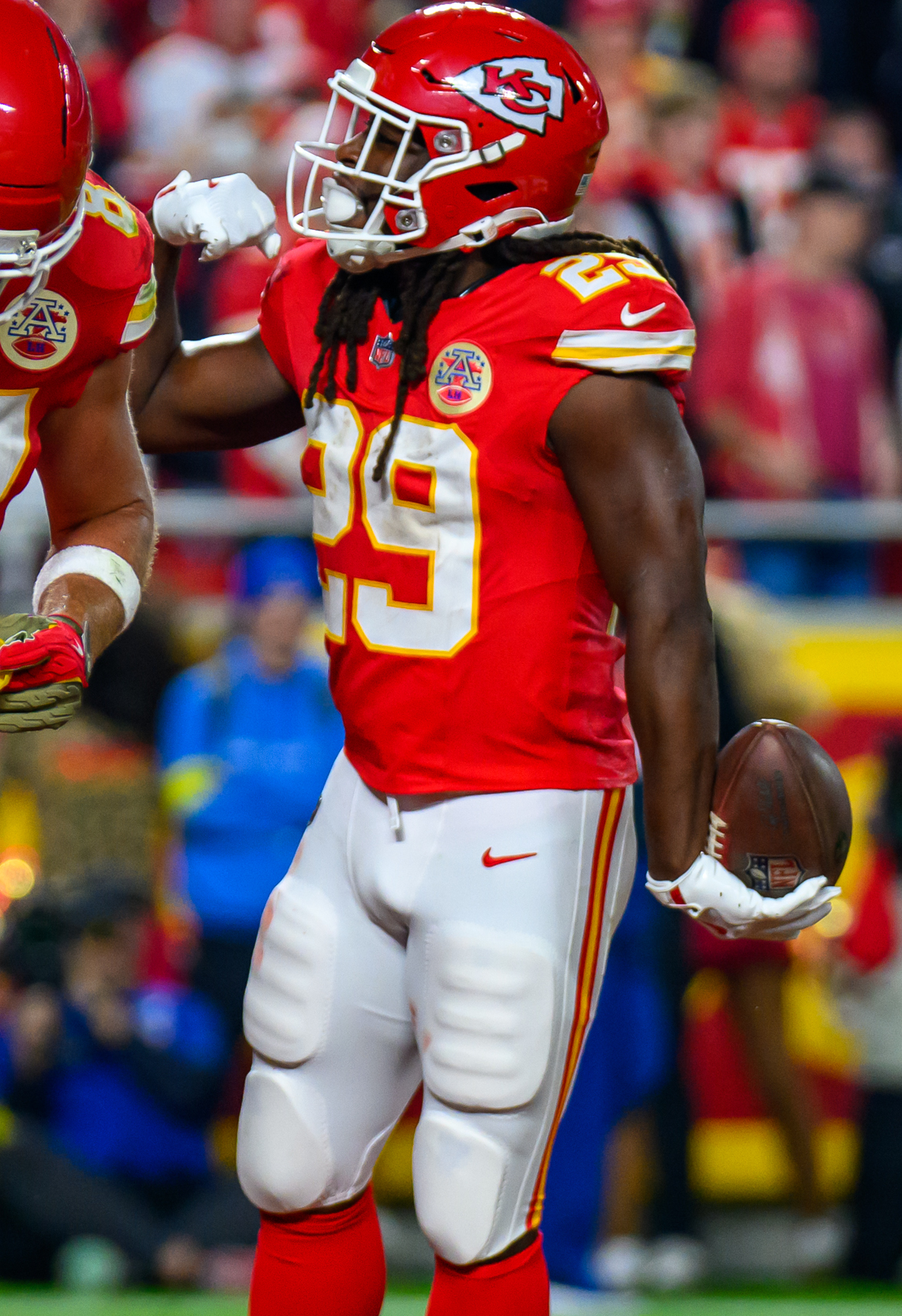
Hunt in 2025

Hunt re-signed with the Chiefs on a one-year deal on March 17, 2025. In Week 12, Hunt rushed for 104 yards and a touchdown on a career-high 30 carries in a 23–20 win over the Indianapolis Colts, earning AFC Offensive Player of the Week. In the 2025 season, he had 163 carries for 611 yards and eight rushing touchdowns to go with a receiving touchdown.

== Career statistics ==
=== NFL ===
Legend
	Led the league
**Bold**	Career high

==== Regular season ====
Year	Team	Games		Rushing					Receiving					Fumbles	
Year	Team	GP	GS	Att	Yds	Avg	Lng	TD	Rec	Yds	Avg	Lng	TD	Fum	Lost
2017	KC	16	16	**272**	**1,327**	**4.9**	**69**	8	**53**	**455**	8.6	**78**	3	1	**1**
2018	KC	11	11	181	824	4.6	45	7	26	378	**14.5**	67	**7**	0	0
2019	CLE	8	3	43	179	4.2	16	2	37	285	7.7	29	1	1	0
2020	CLE	16	5	198	841	4.2	33	6	38	304	8.0	26	5	**2**	0
2021	CLE	8	1	78	386	**4.9**	33	5	22	174	7.9	23	0	0	0
2022	CLE	17	0	123	468	3.8	24	3	35	210	6.0	24	1	1	0
2023	CLE	15	2	135	411	3.0	16	**9**	15	84	5.6	13	0	0	0
2024	KC	13	8	200	728	3.6	20	7	23	176	7.7	26	0	0	0
2025	KC	17	4	163	611	3.7	33	8	18	143	7.9	22	1	**2**	**1**
Career		121	50	1,393	5,775	4.1	69T	55	267	2,209	8.3	78T	18	7	2

==== Postseason ====
Year	Team	Games		Rushing					Receiving					Fumbles	
Year	Team	GP	GS	Att	Yds	Avg	Lng	TD	Rec	Yds	Avg	Lng	TD	Fum	Lost
2017	KC	1	1	11	42	3.8	**16**	1	3	5	1.7	7	0	0	0
2020	CLE	2	0	14	80	**5.7**	13	**3**	2	**15**	**7.5**	**13**	0	0	0
2023	CLE	1	0	8	26	3.3	14	1	**5**	9	1.8	11	**1**	0	0
2024	KC	3	0	**28**	**117**	4.2	12	2	3	13	4.3	6	0	0	0
Career		7	1	61	265	4.3	16	7	13	42	3.2	13	1	0	0

=== College ===
Season	Team	GP	Rushing					Receiving				
Season	Team	GP	Att	Yds	Avg	Lng	TD	Rec	Yds	Avg	Lng	TD
2013	Toledo	12	137	866	6.3	52	6	12	68	5.7	15	0
2014	Toledo	10	205	**1,631**	**8.0**	**91**	**16**	9	39	4.3	10	0
2015	Toledo	9	178	973	5.5	41	12	11	45	4.1	9	0
2016	Toledo	13	**262**	1,475	5.6	47	10	**41**	**403**	**9.8**	**71**	**1**
Career		44	782	4,945	6.3	91	44	73	555	7.6	71	1

== 2018 assault incident ==
On November 30, 2018, TMZ released a February 2018 video of Hunt assaulting a woman in a hotel after his friends claimed that she called him a racial slur. Later that same day, Hunt was placed on the commissioner's exempt list, prohibiting him from practicing and playing with the team. Shortly after being placed on the exempt list, the Chiefs released Hunt. Chiefs co-owner and CEO Clark Hunt released a statement following his release indicating that Hunt was not truthful when the Chiefs asked him about the incident.
