= Eric Patterson (American football) =

American football player (1993–2019)

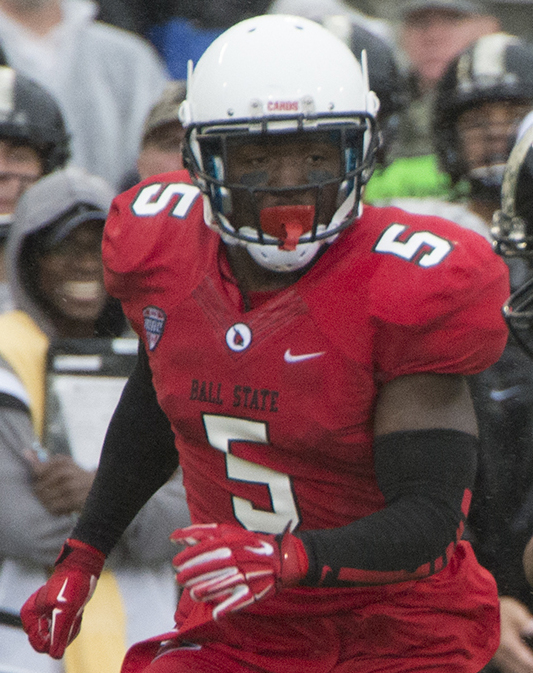
- Patterson with Ball State in 2014

No. 24, 41
- Position: Cornerback

Personal information
- Born: February 5, 1993; Tampa, Florida
- Died: June 8, 2019 (aged 26); Tampa, Florida
- Listed height: 5 ft 9 in (1.75 m)
- Listed weight: 200 lb (91 kg)

Career information
- High school: Henry B. Plant (Tampa, Florida)
- College: Ball State
- NFL draft: 2015: undrafted

Career history
- New England Patriots (2015)*; Indianapolis Colts (2015); St. Louis Rams (2015); Cleveland Browns (2016)*
- * Offseason or practice squad member only

Awards and highlights
- First-team All-MAC (2014)

Career NFL statistics
- Total tackles: 3
- Sacks: 0.0
- Forced fumbles: 0
- Fumble recoveries: 0
- Interceptions: 0
- Stats at Pro Football Reference

Eric Patterson Jr. (February 5, 1993 – June 8, 2019) was an American professional football cornerback. He played college football for Ball State University, and was signed by the New England Patriots as an undrafted free agent in 2015. Patterson was also a member of the Indianapolis Colts, the St. Louis Rams and the Cleveland Browns

== College ==
Patterson played college football for the Ball State Cardinals.

== Professional career ==
=== New England Patriots ===
Patterson signed with the New England Patriots on May 8, 2015. He was released on June 9.

=== Indianapolis Colts ===
On August 9, 2015, Patterson signed with the Indianapolis Colts. He was released on September 5, and signed to the practice squad on September 6. Patterson was elevated to the active roster on September 18, and made his NFL debut against the New York Jets in Week 2, making 2 tackles. On September 22, Patterson was waived by the Colts, and re-signed to the practice squad the following day. He was waived from the practice squad on September 29.

=== St. Louis Rams ===
Patterson signed to the St. Louis Rams practice squad on October 2, 2015.

=== Cleveland Browns ===
On May 16, 2016, Patterson signed with the Cleveland Browns. On September 3, 2016, he was released by the Browns.

== Death ==
Patterson was shot to death by a home intruder in his home in Tampa, Florida on June 8, 2019. A few days later, Tampa police released footage from the street outside the home showing vehicles suspected to have been driven by the shooter. As of September 2020, no arrests had been made.
