= Tucker Gleason =

American football player

No. 4
- Position: Quarterback

Personal information
- Listed height: 6 ft 3 in (1.91 m)
- Listed weight: 245 lb (111 kg)

Career information
- High school: Henry B. Plant (Tampa, Florida)
- College: Georgia Tech (2020); Toledo (2021–2025)

Awards and highlights
- Third-team All-MAC (2025)
- Stats at ESPN

Tucker Gleason is an American former football quarterback. He played college football for the Georgia Tech Yellow Jackets and the Toledo Rockets.

== Early life ==
Gleason grew up in Tampa, Florida and attended East Lake High School and transferred to Plant High School during his junior year. While at Plant, he became the second player in school history to throw for 2,000 yards and complete 1,000 rushing yards in his junior season. He was rated a three-star recruit and committed to play college football at Georgia Tech over offers from Cincinnati, Duke, Georgia, Illinois, Indiana, Kentucky, North Carolina, Pittsburgh, South Florida, Toledo, Vanderbilt, Virginia Tech, and West Virginia.

== College career ==
=== Georgia Tech ===
During the 2020 season, Gleason only played for two games and did not throw any passes. He later on entered the transfer portal. It was announced that he was transferring to Toledo.

=== Toledo ===
Gleason played three games during the 2021 season and completed five passes for 69 yards.

In the 2022 season, Gleason started at quarterback during the Week 9 game against Eastern Michigan and the Battle of I-75 game against Bowling Green after Dequan Finn had suffered an injury. He was named MAC West Offensive Player of the Week after completing 15 of his 27 passes and completing 238 yards and three touchdowns during the Week 9 game. He completed the 2022 season with 884 passing yards, 185 rushing yards, and eight passing touchdowns. During the 2023 season, he played in all 14 games and finished the season with completing 28 out of 55 passing attempts for 383 yards and four touchdowns. During the 2024 season, he played in and started 12 games including the 2024 GameAbove Sports Bowl, finishing the season with completing 233 out of 385 passing attempts for 2,808 yards and 24 touchdowns along with 97 rushing attempts for 364 yards and seven touchdowns.

=== Statistics ===
Year	Team	Games			Passing								Rushing			
Year	Team	GP	GS	Record	Cmp	Att	Pct	Yds	Y/A	TD	Int	Rtg	Att	Yds	Avg	TD
2020	Georgia Tech	2	0	—	Redshirted (redshirt)											
2021	Toledo	3	0	—	5	9	55.6	69	7.7	0	0	120.0	1	4	4.0	0
2022	Toledo	9	2	1–1	58	122	47.5	884	7.2	8	3	125.1	42	185	4.4	3
2023	Toledo	14	1	0–1	28	55	50.9	383	7.0	4	1	129.8	12	55	4.6	0
2024	Toledo	12	12	7–5	233	385	60.5	2,793	7.3	24	8	137.9	97	364	3.8	7
2025	Toledo	12	12	8–4	207	320	64.7	2,515	7.9	21	9	146.7	46	144	3.1	4
Career		52	27	16–11	531	891	59.6	6,659	7.5	57	21	138.8	198	752	3.8	14

== Personal life ==
Gleason's father, Jim, was a linebacker and kicker at the Massachusetts Institute of Technology from 1990 to 1992. His two brothers, Jared and Thad, were also college football players with Jared playing at the offensive line at Stetson in 2014 and Thad playing as a long snapper at Colorado in 2017.
