= Kelvin Farmer =

Profile
- Position: Running back

Personal information
- Born: c. 1965

Career information
- College: Toledo (1983–1986)

Kelvin Farmer (born c. 1965) is a former American football running back for the University of Toledo Rockets football team from 1983 to 1986. As a senior in 1986, he ranked second nationally among major-college football players with 1,532 rushing yards. In four years at Toledo, he tallied, 2,483 rushing yards, 422 receiving yards, 183 yards on kickoff returns, and 23 touchdowns.

== See also ==
- Toledo Rockets football statistical leaders#Rushing
