= Andy Phillips (center) =

American football player (born 1991)

Profile
- Position: Center

Personal information
- Born: July 31, 1991 (age 35); Lansing, Michigan, U.S.
- Listed height: 6 ft 2 in (1.88 m)
- Listed weight: 303 lb (137 kg)

Career information
- High school: Waverly (MI)
- College: Central Michigan
- NFL draft: 2015: undrafted

Career history
- Green Bay Packers (2015)*
- * Offseason or practice squad member only

Awards and highlights
- First-team All-MAC (2014); Named to the Lombardi Award watch list (2014); Second-team All-MAC (2013)

Andy Phillips (born July 31, 1991) is an American former football center. He played college football at Central Michigan.

== Early life ==
Phillips attended Waverly Senior High School in his hometown Lansing, Michigan. He was a four-year starter and finished his career with 510 tackles, and was a four-time all-conference selection.

== College career ==
Phillips redshirted his first year (2010) at Central Michigan University. In 2011, he started the final five games of the season at center. For the three subsequent years, he started every game at left guard, racking up a team-high 43 consecutive starts.

== Professional career ==
Pre-draft measurables
Height	Weight	40-yard dash	10-yard split	20-yard split	20-yard shuttle	Three-cone drill	Vertical jump	Broad jump	Bench press
6 ft 2 in (1.88 m)	300 lb (136 kg)	5.05 s	1.79 s	2.89 s	4.75 s	7.63 s	30 in (0.76 m)	9 ft 2 in (2.79 m)	26 reps
All values from CMU Pro Day

On May 11, 2015, Phillips was signed as an undrafted free agent by the Green Bay Packers, after participating in their rookie orientation camp on a tryout basis. Reportedly, he worked exclusively at center during the open portions of the camp.
