= Dequan Finn =

American football player (born 2001)

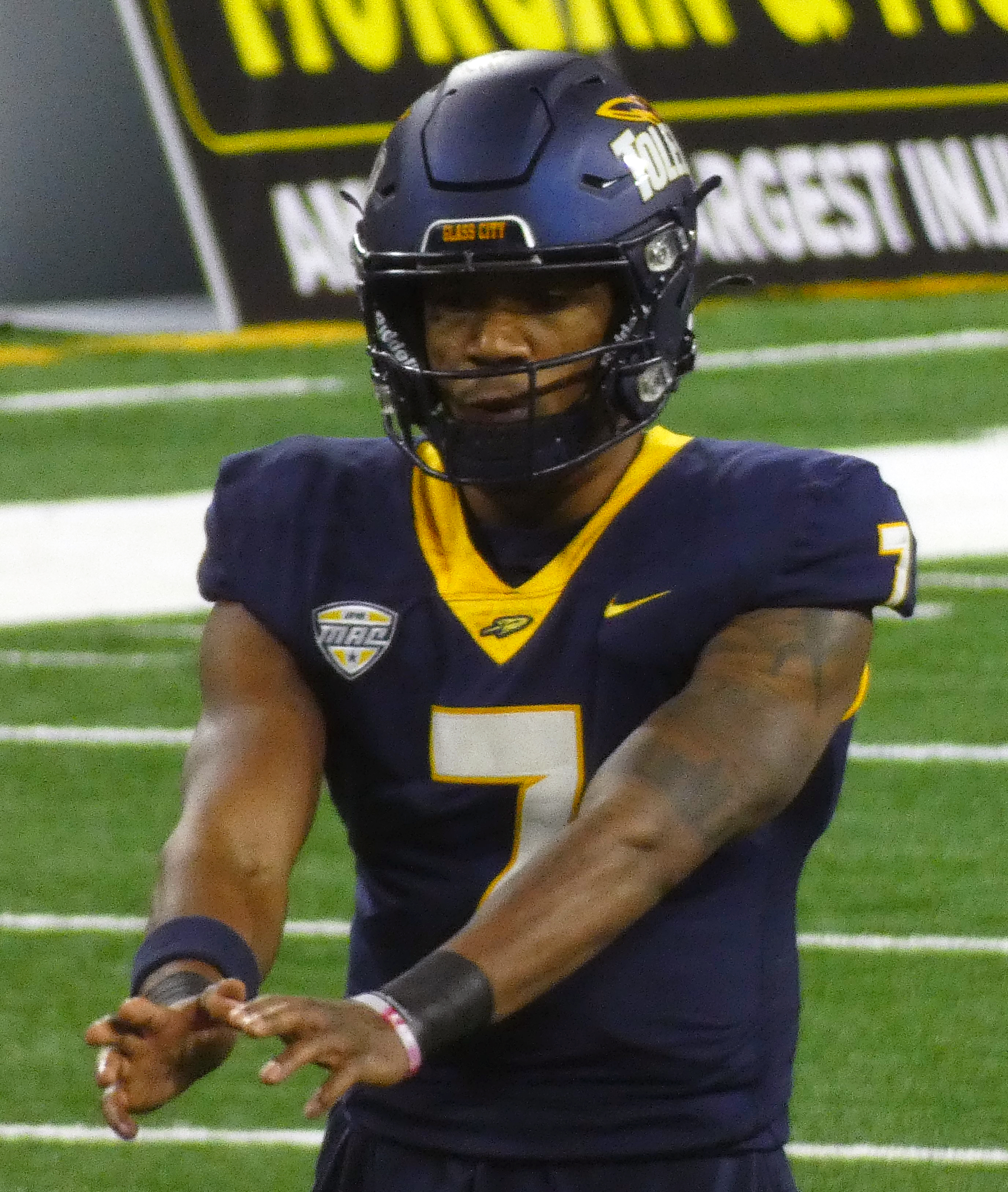
- Finn with Toledo in 2023

Columbus Aviators
- Positions: Quarterback, Defensive back
- Roster status: Active

Personal information
- Born: April 21, 2001 (age 25); Detroit, Michigan, U.S.
- Listed height: 6 ft 1 in (1.85 m)
- Listed weight: 215 lb (98 kg)

Career information
- High school: Martin Luther King (Detroit, Michigan)
- College: Toledo (2019–2023); Baylor (2024); Miami (OH) (2025)
- NFL draft: 2026: undrafted

Career history
- Paris Lights (2026); Columbus Aviators (2027–present)

Awards and highlights
- MAC Most Valuable Player (2023); First team All-MAC (2023); Second-team All-MAC (2022)
- Stats at ESPN

Dequan Finn (born April 21, 2001) is an American professional football quarterback and defensive back for the Columbus Aviators of the United Football League (UFL). He played college football for the Toledo Rockets, Baylor Bears, and Miami RedHawks.

== Early life ==
Finn attended Martin Luther King High School in Detroit, Michigan. As a senior, Finn threw for 25 touchdowns and 2,104 yards while also having 21 rushing touchdowns and 1,264 yards rushing. He would lead Martin Luther King to a state championship, while being named the 2018 Mr. Football Michigan. A three-star recruit, Finn was originally committed to Central Michigan but he would flip to Toledo after Central Michigan fired head coach John Banamego.

== College career ==
=== Toledo ===
Finn played sparingly in his first two years with Toledo, as he red-shirted in his freshman season. In 2021, Finn's production increased as he threw for 18 touchdowns and just two interceptions while rushing for nine touchdowns. Entering the 2022 season, Finn was named to the preseason Maxwell Award watch list. On October 15, 2022, he tied a school record, throwing six touchdowns in a 52–31 comeback win against Kent State and set the school record for most touchdowns in a game (7) by adding one rushing score. In 2022, Finn led the Rockets to their first MAC West championship since the 2017 season. In the 2022 MAC Championship Game Finn was named the offensive MVP. Finn also won the offensive MVP in the 2022 Boca Raton Bowl. In 2023, Finn was named the MAC Most Valuable Player after he led Toledo to an 11–2 record, while passing for 2,657 yards and 22 touchdowns. He entered the transfer portal on December 4, 2023.

=== Baylor ===
On December 17, 2023, Finn announced that he would be transferring to Baylor University, to play for the Baylor Bears. Entering the 2024 season, Finn was named the team's starting quarterback for the season opener against Tarleton State. In his first start at Baylor, he threw for 192 yards and totaled three touchdowns, leading the Bears to a 45–3 victory. He only appeared in three games during the 2024 campaign, applying for a medical hardship waiver with the intent to earn an extra year of collegiate eligibility. On December 13, 2024, Finn entered the transfer portal for the second time.

=== Miami (OH) ===
On January 5, 2025, Finn announced his decision to transfer to Miami University to play for the Miami RedHawks. In eight starts for the RedHawks, he threw for 1,451 yards with nine touchdowns and six interceptions, while also adding 395 rushing yards and four scores. On November 14, Chuck Martin announced that Finn was no longer with the program, citing NFL draft preparation as reason for his departure.

=== College statistics ===
Season	Team	Games			Passing								Rushing			
Season	Team	GP	GS	Record	Cmp	Att	Pct	Yds	Avg	TD	Int	Rtg	Att	Yds	Avg	TD
2019	Toledo	3	0	0–0	6	12	50.0	86	7.2	0	0	110.2	15	90	6.0	0
2020	Toledo	4	0	0–0	0	1	0.0	0	0.0	0	0	0.0	10	51	5.1	0
2021	Toledo	13	7	4–3	144	250	57.6	2,067	8.3	18	2	149.2	112	502	4.5	9
2022	Toledo	12	12	8–4	188	315	59.7	2,260	7.2	23	12	136.4	130	631	4.9	9
2023	Toledo	13	13	11–2	201	317	63.4	2,657	8.4	22	9	147.2	123	563	4.3	7
2024	Baylor	3	2	1–1	23	43	53.5	307	7.1	3	2	127.2	21	66	3.1	2
2025	Miami (OH)	8	8	4–4	106	181	58.6	1,451	8.0	9	6	135.7	89	395	4.4	4
Career		56	42	28−14	669	1,120	59.7	8,841	7.9	75	31	142.6	499	2,302	4.6	31

== Professional career ==
Pre-draft measurables
Height	Weight	Arm length	Hand span	Wingspan
6 ft 0 7/8 in (1.85 m)	215 lb (98 kg)	31 3/4 in (0.81 m)	9 1/4 in (0.23 m)	6 ft 4 3/8 in (1.94 m)
All values from Pro Day

=== Columbus Aviators ===
On October 22, 2026, Finn signed with the Columbus Aviators of the United Football League (UFL).

== Personal life ==
On August 18, 2022, Finn signed an NIL deal with the Detroit Sports Commission, becoming an ambassador for the 17th Xenith Prep Kickoff Classic.
