= Carl Ford (American football) =

American football player (born 1980)

No. 19
- Position: Wide receiver

Personal information
- Born: October 8, 1980 (age 46); Monroe, Michigan, U.S.
- Listed height: 6 ft 0 in (1.83 m)
- Listed weight: 180 lb (82 kg)

Career information
- High school: Monroe (MI)
- College: Toledo
- NFL draft: 2003: 7th round, 256th overall pick

Career history
- Green Bay Packers (2003); Chicago Bears (2004–2005); Philadelphia Eagles (2005); Detroit Lions (2007)*; Chicago Rush (2007)
- * Offseason or practice squad member only

Awards and highlights
- Second-team All-MAC (2002)
- Stats at Pro Football Reference
- Stats at ArenaFan.com

Carl Ford III (born October 8, 1980) is an American former professional football player who was a wide receiver in the National Football League (NFL). He was selected by the Green Bay Packers in the seventh round of the 2003 NFL draft. He played college football at Toledo. Ford was also a member of the Chicago Bears, Philadelphia Eagles, Detroit Lions and Chicago Rush.

== Early life ==
Ford played high school football at Monroe High School in Monroe, Michigan. He caught 16 passes for 238 yards his junior year. He recorded 35 receptions for 644 yards and 67 rushes for 505 yards his senior season. Overall, Ford scored 16 touchdown his senior year, including three kick return touchdowns. He was ranked no. 15 on the Detroit Free Press "Fab 50" list and no. 32 on the Detroit News "Blue Chip" list. He also played basketball and ran track in high school. Ford finished second in the state 400-meter dash to fellow NFL player Charles Rogers his senior season.

== College career ==
Ford played college football for the Toledo Rockets from 1999 to 2002. He caught 15 passes for 172 yards and two touchdowns as a freshman in 1999 while also returning 13 kicks for 260 yards. He totaled nine receptions for 86 yards and returned six kicks for 97 yards during the 2000 season. Ford caught 46 passes for 646 yards and six touchdowns his junior year in 2001. He recorded 79 receptions for a school-record 1,062 yards and nine touchdowns his senior season in 2002 while also returning five kicks for 98 yards.

Overall, he totaled 149 receptions for 1,966 yards and 17 touchdowns during his college career.

== Professional career ==
Ford was selected by the Green Bay Packers in the seventh round, with the 256th overall pick, of the 2003 NFL draft. He officially signed with the team on July 16, 2003. He was placed on injured reserve on August 31, 2003. The next year, Ford was waived by the Packers on September 5, 2004.

He was signed to the practice squad of the Chicago Bears on September 7, 2004. He signed a reserve/future contract with the Bears on January 3, 2005. He played in 10 games for the Bears in 2005, making three solo tackles, before being waived on November 22, 2005.

Ford signed with the Philadelphia Eagles on November 23, 2005. He was waived on August 26, 2006.

Ford was signed by the Chicago Rush of the Arena Football League (AFL) on November 2, 2006. He was placed on refuse to report on February 4, 2007, after having signed with the Lions. After being released by the Lions, he was activated by the Rush on April 5, 2007. Ford was placed on injured reserve on April 19. He was waived by the Rush on May 22, 2007.

He signed a reserve/future contract with the Detroit Lions on January 2, 2007. He was waived by the Lions on April 3, 2007.
