= Dan Williams (defensive end) =

American football player (born 1969)

No. 90, 92
- Positions: Defensive end, defensive tackle

Personal information
- Born: December 15, 1969 (age 56); Ypsilanti, Michigan, U.S.
- Listed height: 6 ft 4 in (1.93 m)
- Listed weight: 290 lb (132 kg)

Career information
- High school: Ypsilanti
- College: Tennessee State, Toledo
- NFL draft: 1993: 1st round, 11th overall pick

Career history
- Denver Broncos (1993–1996); Kansas City Chiefs (1997, 1999–2001)

Career NFL statistics
- Tackles: 188
- Sacks: 27
- Interceptions: 1
- Stats at Pro Football Reference

Daniel Williams II (born December 15, 1969) is an American former professional football player who was a defensive end in the National Football League (NFL). He played college football for the Tennessee State Tigers and Toledo Rockets before being selected 11th overall in the 1993 NFL draft, after the Denver Broncos traded up three spots to acquire him.

Pre-draft measurables
Height	Weight	Arm length	Hand span	40-yard dash	10-yard split	20-yard split	20-yard shuttle	Vertical jump	Broad jump	Bench press
6 ft 3 5/8 in (1.92 m)	290 lb (132 kg)	34 in (0.86 m)	9 3/4 in (0.25 m)	4.89 s	1.70 s	2.84 s	4.62 s	33.5 in (0.85 m)	9 ft 6 in (2.90 m)	21 reps
All values from NFL Combine

He played for the Broncos (1993–1996) and the Kansas City Chiefs (1997, 1999–2001). Williams sat out the entire 1998 season amidst a contract dispute after being tagged as the Chiefs' franchise player. He now resides in Roswell, Georgia.
