= Wasean Tait =

Profile
- Position: Running back

Personal information
- Born: c. 1975

Career information
- College: Toledo (1993-1996, 1998)

Wasean Tait (born c. 1975) is a former American football running back for the University of Toledo Rockets football team from 1993 to 1996 and 1998. During the 1995 season, he ranked second nationally with 1,905 yards (2,090 yards, including the 1995 Las Vegas Bowl), an average of 173.2 yards per game. He was named the 1995 Mid-America Conference Player of the Year and was selected by the uPI as a second-team player on the 1995 All-America college football team. In five years at Toledo, he gained 4,338 rushing yards. He suffered a left knee injury in the second quarter of the 1996 season opener, underwent four surgeries, and missed the 1996 and 1997 seasons. He was inducted into the University of Toledo Hall of Fame in 2006.

== See also ==
- 1995 NCAA Division I-A football season#Rushing
