= Stephen Williams (wide receiver) =

American football player (born 1986)

No. 14, 18, 83
- Position: Wide receiver

Personal information
- Born: June 29, 1986 (age 40); Houston, Texas, U.S.
- Listed height: 6 ft 5 in (1.96 m)
- Listed weight: 208 lb (94 kg)

Career information
- College: Toledo
- NFL draft: 2010: undrafted

Career history
- Arizona Cardinals (2010–2012); Seattle Seahawks (2013); Jacksonville Jaguars (2013); Miami Dolphins (2014)*
- * Offseason or practice squad member only

Awards and highlights
- First-team All-MAC (2009)

Career NFL statistics
- Receptions: 9
- Receiving yards: 101
- Stats at Pro Football Reference

Stephen Jacob Williams (born June 29, 1986) is an American former professional football player who was a wide receiver in the National Football League (NFL). He played college football for the Toledo Rockets and was signed by the Arizona Cardinals as an undrafted free agent in 2010.

== College career ==
He played college football at the University of Toledo, where he set several major team receiving records.

== Professional career ==
=== Arizona Cardinals ===
He signed with the Arizona Cardinals as an undrafted free agent in 2010.

=== Seattle Seahawks ===
On January 25, 2013, Williams signed with the Seattle Seahawks. He was released by the Seahawks on October 5, 2013, to make room for Bruce Irvin, who finished serving a four-game suspension for performance-enhancing drug use.

=== Jacksonville Jaguars ===
On October 7, 2013, Williams was claimed off waivers by the Jacksonville Jaguars.

He was placed on injured reserve on November 23.

He was released on May 12, 2014.

=== Miami Dolphins ===
Williams signed with the Miami Dolphins on May 15, 2014.
