= 2011 Military Bowl =

2011 Military Bowl presented by Northrop Grumman
- 4th Military Bowl
Toledo Rockets	Air Force Falcons
(8–4)	(7–5)
MAC	Mountain West
42	41
Head coach: Matt Campbell	Head coach: Troy Calhoun
	1	2	3	4	Total
Toledo	21	7	7	7	42
Air Force	14	14	7	6	41
- Date: December 28, 2011
- Season: 2011
- Stadium: RFK Stadium
- Location: Washington, D.C.
- MVP: Bernard Reedy (WR, Toledo)
- Favorite: Toledo by 3
- Referee: Riley Johnson (Sun Belt)
- Attendance: 25,042
- Payout: US$1 million per team

United States TV coverage
- Network: ESPN
- Announcers: Pam Ward (Play-by-Play); Dan Hawkins (Analyst); Jeannine Edwards (Sidelines)
- Nielsen ratings: 1.5

The 2011 Military Bowl, the fourth edition of the game, was a post-season American college football bowl game, held on December 28, 2011, at Robert F. Kennedy Memorial Stadium in Washington, D.C. as part of the 2011–12 NCAA bowl season.

The game, which telecast at 4:30 p.m. ET on ESPN, featured the Air Force Falcons from the Mountain West Conference versus the Toledo Rockets from the Mid-American Conference. Sponsored by Northrop Grumman, the game was officially known as the 2011 Military Bowl presented by Northrop Grumman.

== Teams ==
The 2011 Military Bowl was the first meeting between Air Force and Toledo. Prior to the bowl game, the Falcons had played against one Mid-American Conference team, winning and losing one game to Kent State.

=== Air Force ===
The 2011 Military Bowl was the Falcon's fifth consecutive appearance in a bowl game (2007–11). Air Force was highlighted by the performances of Jon Davis who has a 10 career games with 10 or more tackles; Asher Clark who has 11 career 100-yard rushing games; and senior quarterback Tim Jefferson, Air Force's winningest quarterback. The Falcons came into the game 2nd in the FBS in rushing, average 320.3 rushing yards a game.

=== Toledo ===
Coming into this game, Toledo averaged 42.3 points per game for the season, including an FBS-best 53.8 points in November. The team was led by junior first-team All-MAC WR Eric Page, who set numerous school records in 2011, including most receptions in a season (112) and for a career (293) and senior RB Adonis Thomas, who finished the season with 963 yards rushing. Toledo quarterback Terrence Owens, however, only started the final two games of the 2011 season coming into the bowl game; quarterback Austin Dantin started the first 10 games before a concussion sidelined him. A few days after accepting the invitation to the 2011 Military Bowl, coach Tim Beckman left Toledo to become the coach for Illinois, leaving offensive coordinator Matt Campbell to coach the Rockets in the bowl game.

== Game summary ==
Within a period of 5 minutes, 2 seconds in the 1st quarter, Toledo and Air Force scored a combined 5 touchdowns. The Rockets scored first on a 17-yard touchdown pass. On the ensuing kickoff, Air Force's Cody Getz fumbled the ball, giving the ball back to Toledo. Toledo took advantage of the fumble to go up 14–0. Air Force got on board on a 22-yard Tim Jefferson quarterback rush to cut the lead 14–7. On the ensuing kickoff, Toledo's Eric Page returned the kickoff 87 yards to make it 21–7. Air Force, helped by a 60-yard Jonathan Warzeka run, cut the lead 21–14 going into the 2nd quarter.

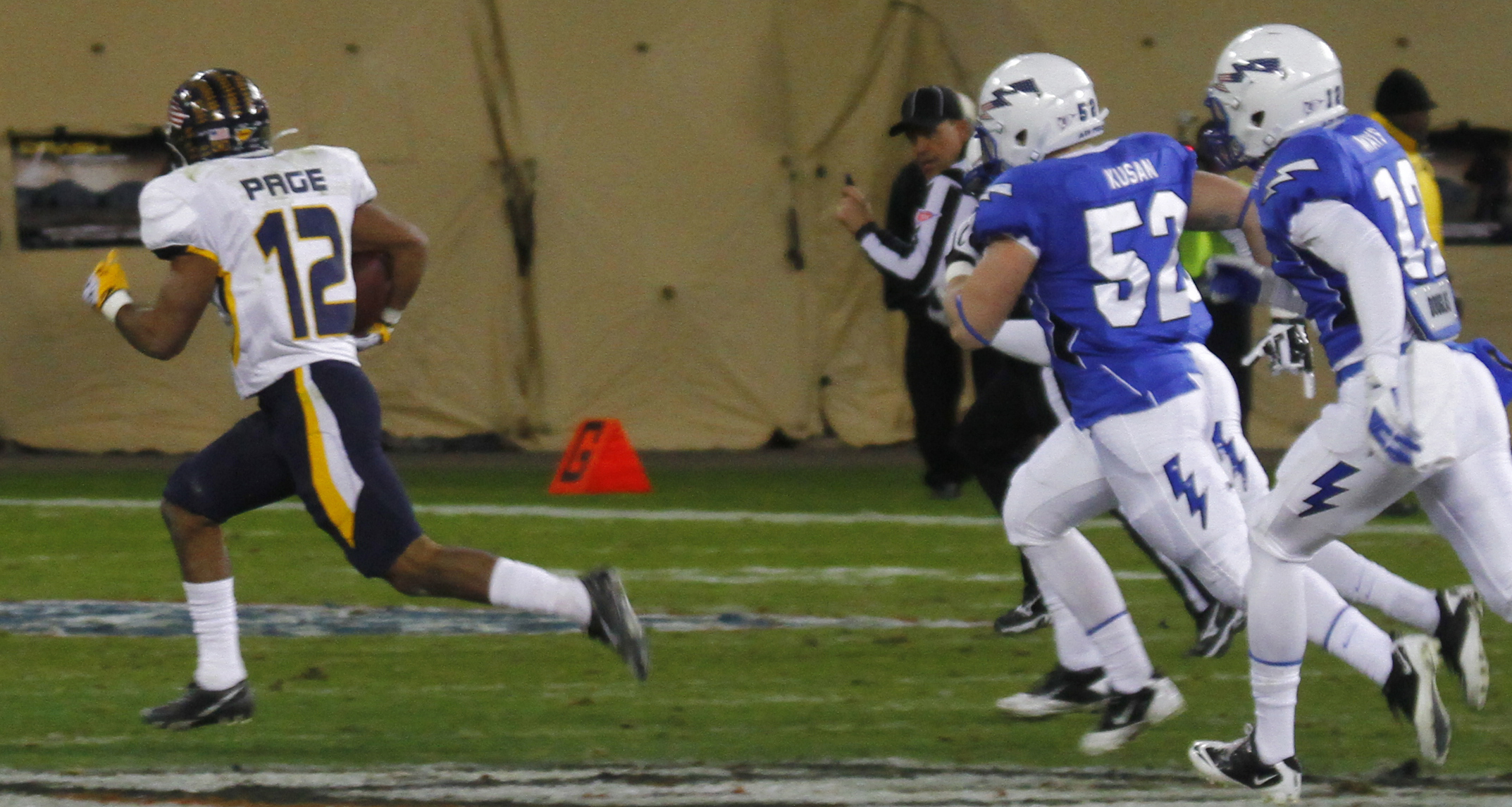
Eric Page (left) scored a touchdown for Toledo in the first quarter.

After forcing Toledo to punt, Air Force tied the game 21–21 on an Asher Clark touchdown run. Toledo retook the lead on a 48-yard passing touchdown to make it 28–21. On the ensuing drive, Air Force turned the ball over on downs. However, Toledo fumbled the ball on its possession. Taking advantage of the fumble, Air Force tied the game 28–28 on a 37-yard touchdown pass. The game remained tied at the end of the first half.

Toledo took the lead in the 3rd quarter when Jermaine Robinson intercepted Tim Jefferson and returned the ball 37-yards for a touchdown. However, the Falcons were able to tie the game 35–35 on a 2-yard Mike DeWitt touchdown run.

The first four drives of the 4th quarter ended in punts. Toledo took the lead on a 33-yard touchdown pass to Bernard Reedy to make it 42–35 with 5:01 remaining in the game. Air Force was able to respond on a 4th-and-3, 33-yard touchdown pass from Tim Jefferson to Zack Kauth with 52 seconds remaining in regulation. Air Force then lined up for to kick an extra point. Instead of going for the extra point, though, Air Force went for a two-point conversion in order to go ahead of Toledo. However, on the conversion attempt, an option run, David Baska pitch to kicker Parker Herrington was low and ended up bouncing out of bounds in the end zone. Toledo was able to recover the Falcon's onside kick and was able to seal the victory after getting a 1st down.

== Scoring Summary ==
Source.

Scoring Play	Score
1st Quarter
UT – Bernard Reedy 17 Yd Pass From Terrance Owens (Ryan Casano Kick), 6:38	UT 7–0
UT – Adonis Thomas 41 Yd Run (Ryan Casano Kick), 6:22	UT 14–0
AFA – Tim Jefferson Jr. 22 Yd Run (Parker Herrington Kick), 2:29	UT 14–7
UT – Eric Page 87 Yd Kickoff Return (Ryan Casano Kick), 2:17	UT 21–7
AFA – Mike DeWitt 3 Yd Run (Parker Herrington Kick), 1:36	UT 21–14
2nd Quarter
AFA – Asher Clark 1 Yd Run (Park Herrington Kick), 9:43	Tie 21–21
UT – Bernard Reedy 49 Yd Pass From Terrance Owens (Ryan Casano Kick), 7:49	UT 28–21
AFA – Jonathan Warzeka 37 Yd Pass From Tim Jefferson Jr. (Parker Herrington Kick), 2:07	Tie 28–28
3rd Quarter
UT – Jermaine Robinson 37 Yd Interception Return (Ryan Casano Kick), 8:56	UT 35–28
AFA – Mike DeWitt 2 Yd Run (Parker Herrington Kick), 5:59	Tie 35–35
4th Quarter
UT – Bernard Reedy 33 Yd Pass From Terrance Owens (Ryan Casano Kick), 5:01	UT 42–35
AFA – Zack Kauth 33 Yd Pass From Tim Jefferson Jr. (Two-Point Conversion Failed), 0:52	UT 42–41

=== Statistics ===
Statistic	Toledo	Air Force
First downs	17	20
Rushes-yards (net)	32–123	55–248
Passing yards (net)	216	159
Passes, Att-Comp-Int	27–21–1	22–13–1
Total offense, plays – yards	57–339	77–407
Time of Possession	25:47	34:13
