= Mike Alston =

American football player (born 1985)

No. 44, 40
- Position: Linebacker

Personal information
- Born: August 28, 1985 (age 41); Columbus, Ohio, U.S.
- Listed height: 6 ft 3 in (1.91 m)
- Listed weight: 250 lb (113 kg)

Career information
- High school: Beechcroft (Columbus)
- College: Toledo
- NFL draft: 2007: undrafted

Career history
- Cleveland Browns (2007)*; Mahoning Valley Thunder (2009); Chicago Rush (2010); Spokane Shock (2011–2012); Utah Blaze (2013); New Orleans VooDoo (2014); Cleveland Gladiators (2015)
- * Offseason or practice squad member only

Awards and highlights
- ArenaBowl champion (2010)

Career AFL statistics
- Tackles: 116.5
- Sacks: 26.5
- Forced fumbles: 7
- Fumble recoveries: 6
- Interceptions: 1
- Stats at ArenaFan.com

Mike Alston (born August 28, 1985) is an American former football linebacker/defensive lineman.

Alston was signed by the Cleveland Browns of the National Football League (NFL) as an undrafted free agent in 2007. Alston completed his college career at Toledo.

He played indoor football for the Chicago Rush in 2010, the Spokane Shock in 2011 and 2012, and the Utah Blaze in 2013. In 2014, he played for the New Orleans VooDoo, where he set the franchise record for sacks in a season.

On March 5, 2015, Alston was assigned to the Cleveland Gladiators.
