= 2008 Toledo Rockets football team =

American college football season

2008 Toledo Rockets football
- Conference: Mid-American Conference
- West Division
- Record: 3–9 (2–6 MAC)
- Head coach: Tom Amstutz (8th season)
- Offensive coordinator: Chris Hedden (1st season)
- Offensive scheme: Spread
- Defensive coordinator: Tim Rose (4th season)
- Base defense: 3–4
- Home stadium: Glass Bowl

2008 Mid-American Conference football standings
	Conf.			Overall
Team	W		L	W		L
East Division
Buffalo x$	5	–	3	8	–	6
Bowling Green	4	–	4	6	–	6
Temple	4	–	4	5	–	7
Ohio	3	–	5	4	–	8
Akron	3	–	5	5	–	7
Kent State	3	–	5	4	–	8
Miami (OH)	1	–	7	2	–	10
West Division
Ball State x	8	–	0	12	–	2
Central Michigan	6	–	2	8	–	5
Western Michigan	6	–	2	9	–	4
Northern Illinois	5	–	3	6	–	7
Toledo	2	–	6	3	–	9
Eastern Michigan	2	–	6	3	–	9
Championship: Buffalo 42, Ball State 24
$ – Conference champion; x – Division champion/co-champions

The 2008 Toledo Rockets football team represented the University of Toledo during the 2008 NCAA Division I FBS football season. Toledo competed as a member of the West Division of the Mid-American Conference (MAC). The Rockets were led by Tom Amstutz in his eighth and final year as head coach.

Toledo finished the year 3–9 overall and 2–6 in conference play. The season highlight was a 13–10 victory over the Michigan Wolverines; Michigan entered the game 24–0 against MAC teams.

== Schedule ==
Date	Time	Opponent	Site	TV	Result	Attendance
September 6	10:00 pm	at Arizona*	Arizona Stadium; Tucson, AZ		L 16–41	50,939
September 13	12:00 pm	at Eastern Michigan	Rynearson Stadium; Ypsilanti, MI		W 41–17	16,860
September 20	8:15 pm	No. 25 Fresno State*	Glass Bowl; Toledo, OH	ESPNU	L 54–55 ^{2OT}	20,096
September 27	7:00 pm	Florida International*	Glass Bowl; Toledo, OH		L 16–35	19,004
October 4	7:00 pm	Ball State^{†}	Glass Bowl; Toledo, OH		L 0–31	18,009
October 11	12:00 pm	at Michigan*	Michigan Stadium; Ann Arbor, MI	BTN	W 13–10	107,267
October 18	4:00 pm	at Northern Illinois	Huskie Stadium; DeKalb, IL	CSNC	L 7–38	22,092
October 25	12:00 pm	at Central Michigan	Glass Bowl; Toledo, OH	ESPN+	L 23–24	21,422
November 5	7:00 pm	at Akron	Rubber Bowl; Akron, OH	ESPNU	L 30–47	10,134
November 15	2:00 pm	at Western Michigan	Waldo Stadium; Kalamazoo, MI	FS Detroit	L 17–27	12,336
November 21	7:00 pm	Miami (OH)	Glass Bowl; Toledo, OH		W 42–14	12,251
November 28	3:30 pm	Bowling Green	Glass Bowl; Toledo, OH (Battle of I-75)	ESPN Classic	L 10–38	11,264
*Non-conference game; ^{†}Homecoming; Rankings from Coaches' Poll released prior to the game; All times are in Eastern time
