= Jerjuan Newton =

American football player (born 2001)

Profile
- Position: Wide receiver

Personal information
- Born: May 19, 2001 (age 25); St. Petersburg, Florida, U.S.
- Listed height: 5 ft 11 in (1.80 m)
- Listed weight: 192 lb (87 kg)

Career information
- High school: Clearwater Central Catholic (Clearwater, Florida)
- College: Toledo (2019–2024)
- NFL draft: 2025: undrafted

Career history
- Denver Broncos (2025)*; Hamilton Tiger-Cats (2026)*
- * Offseason or practice squad member only

Awards and highlights
- 2× First-team All-MAC (2023, 2024); Second-team All-MAC (2022)

Jerjuan Trevonte Newton (/ʒərˈwɑːn/ zhər-WAHN; born May 19, 2001) is an American professional football wide receiver. He played college football for the Toledo Rockets and was signed by the Denver Broncos as an undrafted free agent in 2025. Newton holds the Toledo record for career receiving touchdowns.

== Early life ==
Newton was born on May 19, 2001. He grew up in St. Petersburg, Florida, but attended Clearwater Central Catholic High School in the Tampa Bay area. Along with football, Newton also played basketball while at Clearwater. Newton received offers from multiple schools and ultimately chose to attend the University of Toledo to play college football.

== College career ==
In his first year, Newton only caught one pass for 21 yards in a game against Ball State. Newton played in all six games in the following season, and caught his first two touchdown passes along with having 203 receiving yards. Newton's production decreased in 2021, with him only having 144 receiving yards and one touchdown. In 2022, Newton had his first 100+ receiving yards games against UMass and Kent State, and ended the season with 830 receiving yards along with a team-best 53 receptions. Additionally, Newton was named to the second-team All-MAC team. The following year Newton's statistics decreased slightly but he still led Toledo in receptions, receiving yards, and touchdowns, all culminating in Newton receiving first-team All-MAC honors. In 2024, finished the season with a career-high in receptions, receiving yards, and touchdowns, having 72, 1,033, and 11 respectively. In the Battle of I-75 game against Bowling Green, Newton had a career-high 164 receiving yards in a game, and also set the Toledo football school record for receiving touchdowns. For the second year in a row, Newton was named to the first-team All-MAC team. After finishing his collegiate career at Toledo, Newton was fifth all-time in receptions and receiving yards and first in receiving touchdowns with 32.

=== Statistics ===
Year	Team	Games		Receiving				Rushing			
Year	Team	GP	GS	Rec	Yds	Avg	TD	Att	Yds	Avg	TD
2019	Toledo	5	0	1	21	21.0	0	0	0	0.0	0
2020	Toledo	6	0	15	203	13.5	2	0	0	0.0	0
2021	Toledo	11	8	13	144	11.1	1	0	0	0.0	0
2022	Toledo	14	14	53	830	15.7	9	1	–1	–1.0	0
2023	Toledo	14	14	52	696	13.4	9	1	2	2.0	0
2024	Toledo	13	13	72	1,048	14.6	11	1	1	1.0	0
Career		63	49	206	2,942	14.3	32	3	2	0.7	0

== Professional career ==
Pre-draft measurables
Height	Weight	Arm length	Hand span	40-yard dash	10-yard split	20-yard split	20-yard shuttle	Three-cone drill	Vertical jump	Broad jump	Bench press
5 ft 10 5/8 in (1.79 m)	194 lb (88 kg)	31 1/8 in (0.79 m)	9 1/2 in (0.24 m)	4.60 s	1.60 s	2.58 s	4.13 s	6.97 s	36.0 in (0.91 m)	10 ft 3 in (3.12 m)	19 reps
All values from Pro Day

=== Denver Broncos ===
After going unselected in the 2025 NFL draft, Newton signed with the Denver Broncos as an undrafted free agent. On August 25, 2025, Newton was waived by the Broncos.

=== Hamilton Tiger-Cats ===
Newton signed with the Hamilton Tiger-Cats of the Canadian Football League (CFL) on January 23, 2026. He was released on May 31 as part of final roster cuts.

== Personal life ==
Newton's four brothers, Jervon, Jerquan, Jershaun, and Jer'Zhan all played football, with Jervon, Jerquan, and Jer'Zhan playing on the same football team as Newton while they were at Clearwater. His cousin, Pro Wells, previously played tight end for the Philadelphia Stars of the now-defunct USFL.
