= Alonzo Russell (American football) =

American football player (born 1992)

No. 84
- Position: Wide receiver

Personal information
- Born: September 29, 1992 (age 34); Washington, D.C., U.S.
- Listed height: 6 ft 4 in (1.93 m)
- Listed weight: 218 lb (99 kg)

Career information
- High school: H.D. Woodson (Washington, D.C.)
- College: Toledo
- NFL draft: 2016: undrafted

Career history
- Cincinnati Bengals (2016–2017)*; Arizona Cardinals (2017)*; New York Giants (2018); St. Louis BattleHawks (2020); Winnipeg Blue Bombers (2020–2021)*; Ottawa Redblacks (2021)
- * Offseason or practice squad member only

Awards and highlights
- Second-team All-MAC (2015); 3x Third-team All-MAC (2012-14)
- Stats at Pro Football Reference

Alonzo Jermey Russell (born September 29, 1992) is an American former professional football player who was a wide receiver in the National Football League (NFL). He played college football for the Toledo Rockets and signed with the Cincinnati Bengals as an undrafted free agent in 2016. He was also a member of the Cincinnati Bengals, Arizona Cardinals and New York Giants of the National Football League (NFL), and Winnipeg Blue Bombers and Ottawa Redblacks of the Canadian Football League (CFL).

== College career ==
After redshirting the 2011 season at the University of Toledo, Russell's collegiate debut came against the Arizona Wildcats where he hauled in three receptions for 71 yards and one touchdown. In week 3, Russell caught six passes for a career high 152 yards and one touchdown in a 27-15 victory against the Bowling Green Falcons. He ranked second on the team with 56 catches, 960 yards and five touchdowns, earning him third-team All-MAC. In 2013, Russell earned third team All-MAC for the second straight season. Russell caught a game winning touchdown pass from 11 yards out against Bowling Green in the final two minutes of play. In 2014, Russell caught a career best eight touchdowns and also had at least two receptions in all 13 games played. He earned third team All-MAC for the third straight season. In 2015, Russell would have 36 receptions for 618 yards and five touchdowns, earning him second team All-MAC. Russell ranks fifth in Rocket's history with 202 catches, fourth in receiving yards with 3,076 and tied for forth with 24 touchdown receptions. Russell holds Toledo's record with 50 straight games with a reception.

== Professional career ==
=== Cincinnati Bengals ===
Russell signed with the Cincinnati Bengals after going undrafted in the 2016 NFL draft. On September 3, 2016, he was waived by the Bengals and was signed to the practice squad the next day. After spending the entire season on the practice squad, Russell signed a futures contract with the Bengals on January 2, 2017.

On September 2, 2017, Russell was waived by the Bengals.

=== Arizona Cardinals ===
On November 22, 2017, Russell was signed to the Arizona Cardinals' practice squad.

=== New York Giants ===
On May 14, 2018, Russell signed with the New York Giants. He was waived on September 1, 2018, and was signed to the practice squad the next day. He was promoted to the active roster on December 29, 2018. The following day, Russell would appear in his first NFL game against the Dallas Cowboys where he would appear in eight offensive snaps and seven on special teams.

On September 1, 2019, Russell was waived by the Giants.

=== St. Louis BattleHawks ===
Russell was selected in the 9th round (70th overall) of the first phase by the St. Louis BattleHawks in the 2020 XFL draft. He had his contract terminated when the league suspended operations on April 10, 2020.

=== Winnipeg Blue Bombers ===
Russell signed with the Winnipeg Blue Bombers of the CFL on July 3, 2020. The 2020 CFL season was cancelled due to the COVID-19 pandemic. He was released on July 19, 2021.

=== Ottawa Redblacks ===
Russell signed with the CFL's Ottawa Redblacks on August 31, 2021. He was moved to the practice roster on September 7, released on September 18, signed back to the practice roster on September 25, and released for the final time on November 2, 2021.

== Career statistics ==
=== Professional ===
Professional statistics
| Year | Team | League | Games | | Receiving | | | |
| Year | Team | League | GP | GS | Rec | Yds | Avg | TD |
|---|---|---|---|---|---|---|---|---|
| 2018 | NYG | NFL | 1 | 0 | 0 | 0 | 0.0 | 0 |
| 2020 | STL | XFL | 5 | 5 | 15 | 161 | 10.7 | 1 |

=== College ===
College statistics
| Year | Team | GP | Receiving | | | |
| Year | Team | GP | Rec | Yds | Avg | TD |
|---|---|---|---|---|---|---|
| 2011 | Toledo | Redshirt (redshirt) | | | | |
| 2012 | Toledo | 13 | 56 | 960 | 17.1 | 5 |
| 2013 | Toledo | 12 | 59 | 728 | 12.3 | 6 |
| 2014 | Toledo | 13 | 51 | 770 | 15.1 | 8 |
| 2015 | Toledo | 12 | 36 | 618 | 17.2 | 5 |
| Career | | 50 | 202 | 3,076 | 15.2 | 24 |
