= 2015 GoDaddy Bowl (January) =

- 16th GoDaddy Bowl
Toledo Rockets	Arkansas State Red Wolves
(8–4)	(7–5)
MAC	Sun Belt
63	44
Head coach: Matt Campbell	Head coach: Blake Anderson
	1	2	3	4	Total
Toledo	21	14	7	21	63
Arkansas State	14	3	14	13	44
- Date: January 4, 2015
- Season: 2014
- Stadium: Ladd–Peebles Stadium
- Location: Mobile, Alabama
- MVP: Kareem Hunt (RB, Toledo)
- Favorite: Toledo by 3.5
- Referee: Ken Antee (C-USA)
- Attendance: 36,811
- Payout: US$TBD

United States TV coverage
- Network: ESPN/Nevada Sports Network
- Announcers: Allen Bestwick, Ray Bentley, & Quint Kessenich (ESPN); Mike Grace, Jay Roberson, & Blake Gardner (Nevada SN)

The 2015 GoDaddy Bowl was a post-season American college football bowl game held on January 4, 2015, at Ladd–Peebles Stadium in Mobile, Alabama in the United States. The sixteenth edition of the GoDaddy Bowl, it featured the Toledo Rockets of the Mid-American Conference against the Arkansas State Red Wolves of the Sun Belt Conference. The game began at 8:00 p.m. CST and aired on ESPN. It was one of the 2014–15 bowl games that concluded the 2014 FBS football season. The game was sponsored by web hosting service company GoDaddy.

== Team selection ==
The game featured the Toledo Rockets of the Mid-American Conference against the Arkansas State Red Wolves of the Sun Belt Conference.

It was the third overall meeting between these two teams, with Toledo leading the series 2–0 prior to the kickoff. The last time these two teams met was in 1992.

=== Toledo Rockets ===
After the Rockets finished the regular season with an 8–4 record, they accepted their invitation to play in the game.

This was Toledo's second GoDaddy Bowl; the Rockets previously won the 2005 game (when it was known as the GMAC Bowl) over the UTEP Miners, 45–13.

=== Arkansas State Red Wolves ===
After the Red Wolves finished the regular season with a 7–5 record, bowl director Jerry Silverstein extended an invitation to play in the game.

This was the Red Wolves' fourth GoDaddy Bowl, extending their record for most appearances in the game. The Red Wolves had a 2–1 record in the GoDaddy Bowl prior to this match-up, losing the 2012 game to the Northern Illinois Huskies, 38–20, winning the 2013 game over the Kent State Golden Flashes, 17–13, and winning the 2014 game over the Ball State Cardinals, 23–20.

== Game summary ==
=== Scoring summary ===
Scoring summary

Quarter	Time	Drive			Team	Scoring information	Score	
Quarter	Time	Plays	Yards	TOP	Team	Scoring information	TOL	ARST
1	14:50	–	–	–	TOL	Fumble recovery returned 0 yards for touchdown by Trent Voss, Jeremiah Detmer kick good	7	0
1	13:30	5	75	1:20	ARST	Booker Mays 44-yard touchdown reception from Fredi Knighten, Logan Spry kick good	7	7
1	5:04	12	88	4:35	TOL	Kareem Hunt 4-yard touchdown run, Jeremiah Detmer kick good	14	7
1	2:36	3	70	1:16	TOL	Kareem Hunt 44-yard touchdown run, Jeremiah Detmer kick good	21	7
1	1:25	3	82	1:11	ARST	Tres Houston 66-yard touchdown reception from Fredi Knighten, Logan Spry kick good	21	14
2	7:13	8	42	3:29	ARST	31-yard field goal by Logan Spry	21	17
2	2:28	13	75	4:45	TOL	Kareem Hunt 29-yard touchdown run, Jeremiah Detmer kick good	28	17
2	0:34	–	–	–	TOL	Fumble recovery returned 67 yards for touchdown by Allen Covington, Jeremiah Detmer kick good	35	17
3	8:15	8	69	3:21	TOL	Kareem Hunt 6-yard touchdown run, Jeremiah Detmer kick good	42	17
3	4:40	8	83	3:35	ARST	Booker Mays 55-yard touchdown reception from Fredi Knighten, Logan Spry kick good	42	24
3	2:06	–	–	–	ARST	Interception returned 94 yards for touchdown by Money Hunter, Logan Spry kick good	42	31
4	11:46	11	75	5:20	TOL	Kareem Hunt 1-yard touchdown run, Jeremiah Detmer kick good	49	31
4	10:08	5	49	1:38	ARST	Booker Mays 27-yard touchdown reception from Fredi Knighten, Logan Spry kick good	49	38
4	6:33	6	70	3:35	TOL	Damion Jones-Moore 10-yard touchdown run, Jeremiah Detmer kick good	56	38
4	2:17	14	75	4:16	ARST	Darion Griswold 3-yard touchdown reception from Fredi Knighten, 2-point pass no good	56	44
4	1:02	4	52	1:15	TOL	Damion Jones-Moore 29-yard touchdown run, Jeremiah Detmer kick good	63	44
"TOP" = time of possession. For other American football terms, see Glossary of American football.							63	44

=== Statistics ===
Statistics	TOL	ARST
First downs	30	20
Plays–yards	80–541	63–468
Rushes–yards	53–365	32–65
Passing yards	176	403
Passing: Comp–Att–Int	21–27–1	23–31–0
Time of possession	35:17	24:43
