= Bernard Reedy =

American gridiron football player (born 1991)

No. 17, 18
- Position: Wide receiver

Personal information
- Born: December 31, 1991 (age 34); St. Petersburg, Florida, U.S.
- Listed height: 5 ft 8 in (1.73 m)
- Listed weight: 175 lb (79 kg)

Career information
- High school: Lakewood (St. Petersburg)
- College: Toledo
- NFL draft: 2014: undrafted

Career history
- Atlanta Falcons (2014−2015)*; Tampa Bay Buccaneers (2016–2017); New England Patriots (2017); Tampa Bay Buccaneers (2018)*; Arizona Cardinals (2018)*; Tampa Bay Buccaneers (2018)*; New York Guardians (2020)*; Calgary Stampeders (2020–2021)*
- * Offseason or practice squad member only

Awards and highlights
- First-team All-MAC (2012)

Career NFL statistics
- Receptions: 2
- Receiving yards: 21
- Rushing yards: 17
- Return yards: 320
- Stats at Pro Football Reference

Bernard Reedy Jr. (born December 31, 1991) is an American former professional football player who was a wide receiver in the National Football League (NFL). He was signed by the Atlanta Falcons as an undrafted free agent in 2014. He played college football for the Toledo Rockets.

== College career ==
Reedy played college football at the University of Toledo. He finished his career with 195 receptions for 2,743 yards and 23 touchdowns. He was a major contributor in his team's success.

== Professional career ==
=== Atlanta Falcons ===
Reedy was signed to the Atlanta Falcons as an undrafted free agent. On September 2, 2015, he was released by the Falcons.

=== Tampa Bay Buccaneers ===
On February 5, 2016, he was signed to a futures contract by the Tampa Bay Buccaneers. On September 3, 2016, he was released by the Buccaneers as part of final roster cuts. He was signed to the practice squad on December 6, 2016. On December 21, 2016, he was promoted to the active roster. In Week 3, against the Minnesota Vikings, Reedy recorded his first career NFL carry, a three-yard rush. On November 17, 2017, Reedy was waived by the Buccaneers.

=== New England Patriots ===
On November 22, 2017, Reedy was signed to the New England Patriots' practice squad. He was promoted to the active roster on December 2, 2017. He was waived on December 13, 2017, and later re-signed to the practice squad. He was released on January 3, 2018. He was re-signed to the Patriots active roster on January 17, 2018. The Patriots made it to Super Bowl LII only to lose to the Philadelphia Eagles.

On March 7, 2018, Reedy was waived by the Patriots.

=== Tampa Bay Buccaneers (second stint) ===
On May 23, 2018, Reedy signed with the Tampa Bay Buccaneers. He was waived on September 1, 2018.

=== Arizona Cardinals ===
On October 2, 2018, Reedy was signed to the Arizona Cardinals' practice squad. On October 15, 2018, the Cardinals released Reedy.

=== Tampa Bay Buccaneers (third stint) ===
On November 6, 2018, Reedy was signed to the Tampa Bay Buccaneers practice squad.

=== New York Guardians ===
Reedy signed with the New York Guardians of the XFL on January 7, 2020. He was waived during final roster cuts on January 22, 2020.

=== Calgary Stampeders ===
Reedy signed with the Calgary Stampeders of the CFL on March 20, 2020. He was released on July 19, 2021.
