= 2014 Toledo Rockets football team =

American college football season

2014 Toledo Rockets football

MAC West Division co-champion GoDaddy Bowl champion

GoDaddy Bowl, W 63–44 vs. Arkansas State
- Conference: Mid-American Conference
- West Division
- Record: 9–4 (7–1 MAC)
- Head coach: Matt Campbell (3rd season)
- Co-offensive coordinators: Jason Candle (2nd season); Louis Ayeni (2nd season)
- Offensive scheme: Spread
- Defensive coordinator: Jon Heacock (1st season)
- Base defense: 4–3 or 4–2–5
- Home stadium: Glass Bowl

2014 Mid-American Conference football standings
	Conf.			Overall
Team	W		L	W		L
East Division
Bowling Green x	5	–	3	8	–	6
Ohio	4	–	4	6	–	6
Buffalo	3	–	4	5	–	6
Akron	3	–	5	5	–	7
UMass	3	–	5	3	–	9
Miami (OH)	2	–	6	2	–	10
Kent State	1	–	6	2	–	9
West Division
Northern Illinois xy$	7	–	1	11	–	3
Toledo x	7	–	1	9	–	4
Western Michigan	6	–	2	8	–	5
Central Michigan	5	–	3	7	–	6
Ball State	4	–	4	5	–	7
Eastern Michigan	1	–	7	2	–	10
Championship: Northern Illinois 51, Bowling Green 17
$ – Conference champion; x – Division champion/co-champions; y – Championship game participant

The 2014 Toledo Rockets football team represented the University of Toledo in the 2014 NCAA Division I FBS football season. They were led by head coach Matt Campbell in his third full year after coaching the Rockets in the 2011 Military Bowl. They played their home games at the Glass Bowl and were members of the West Division of the Mid-American Conference. They finished the season 9–4, 7–1 in MAC play to finish in a tie for the West Division title with Northern Illinois. Due to their head-to-head loss to Northern Illinois, they did not represent the West Division in the MAC Championship Game. They were invited to the GoDaddy Bowl where they defeated Arkansas State.

== Schedule ==
Date	Time	Opponent	Site	TV	Result	Attendance
August 30	7:00 p.m.	No. 4 (FCS) New Hampshire*	Glass Bowl; Toledo, OH	ESPN3	W 54–20	20,184
September 6	12:00 p.m.	No. 24 Missouri*	Glass Bowl; Toledo, OH	ESPN	L 24–49	24,196
September 12	7:00 p.m.	at Cincinnati*	Paul Brown Stadium; Cincinnati, OH	ESPNU	L 34–58	31,912
September 20	7:00 p.m.	Ball State	Glass Bowl; Toledo, OH	ESPN3	W 34–23	17,229
September 27	7:00 p.m.	Central Michigan	Glass Bowl; Toledo, OH	ESPN3	W 42–28	18,087
October 4	7:00 p.m.	at Western Michigan	Waldo Stadium; Kalamazoo, MI	ESPN3	W 20–19 ^{OT}	11,493
October 11	3:30 p.m.	at Iowa State*	Jack Trice Stadium; Ames, IA	MC22	L 30–37	52,281
October 25	2:00 p.m.	Massachusetts^{†}	Glass Bowl; Toledo, OH	ESPN3	W 42–35	20,104
November 4	8:00 p.m.	at Kent State	Dix Stadium; Kent, OH	ESPNU	W 30–20	7,471
November 11	8:00 p.m.	at Northern Illinois	Huskie Stadium; DeKalb, IL	ESPN2	L 24–27	8,462
November 19	8:00 p.m.	Bowling Green	Glass Bowl; Toledo, OH (Battle of I-75 Trophy)	ESPN2	W 27–20	17,486
November 28	1:00 p.m.	at Eastern Michigan	Rynearson Stadium; Ypsilanti, MI	ESPN3	W 52–16	15,226
January 4, 2015	9:00 p.m.	vs. Arkansas State*	Ladd–Peebles Stadium; Mobile, AL (GoDaddy Bowl)	ESPN	W 63–44	36,811
*Non-conference game; ^{†}Homecoming; Rankings from AP Poll released prior to the game; All times are in Eastern time
