= Eric Page =

American gridiron football player (born 1991)

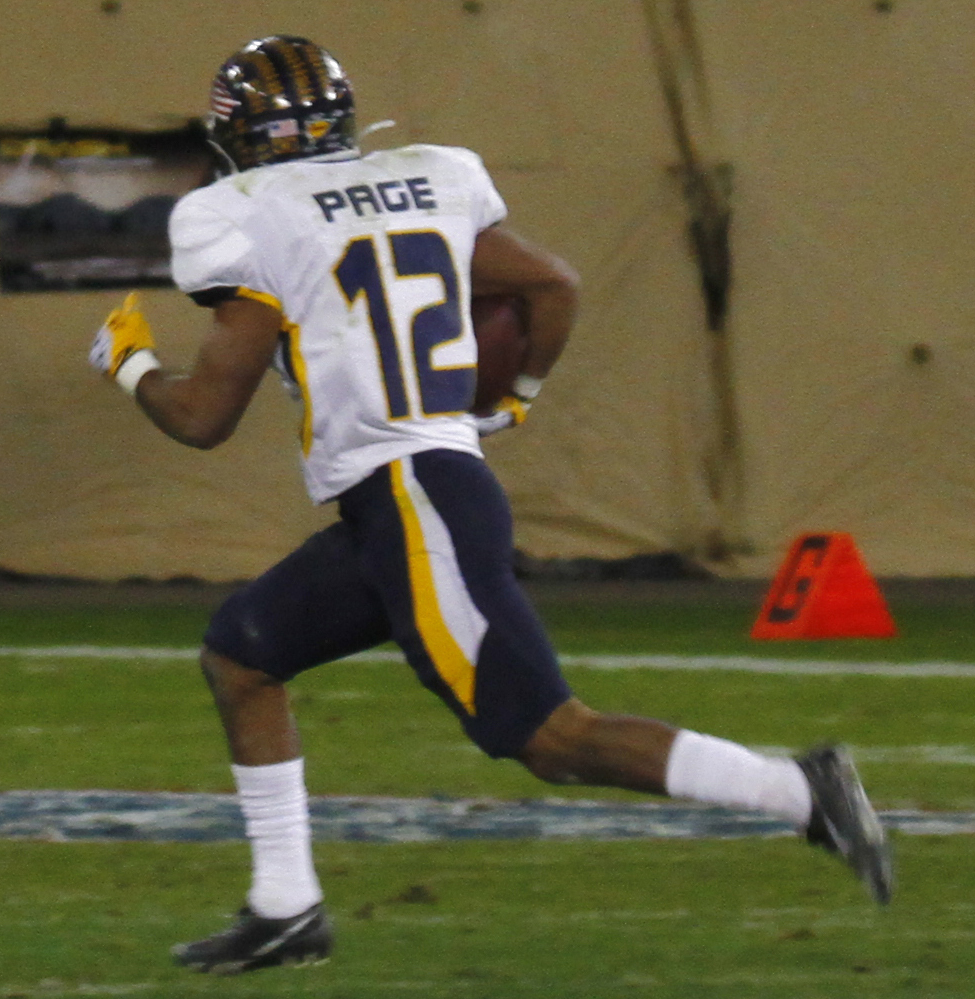
- Page with Toledo at the 2011 Military Bowl

No. 17
- Position: Wide receiver / Punt returner

Personal information
- Born: September 23, 1991 (age 35); Toledo, Ohio, U.S.
- Listed height: 5 ft 9 in (1.75 m)
- Listed weight: 185 lb (84 kg)

Career information
- High school: Springfield Local (Holland, Ohio)
- College: Toledo
- NFL draft: 2012: undrafted

Career history
- Denver Broncos (2012)*; Tampa Bay Buccaneers (2013–2014); Edmonton Eskimos (2015)*
- * Offseason or practice squad member only

Awards and highlights
- Consensus All-American (2010); MAC Special Teams Player of the Year (2010); 2× First-team All-MAC (2010, 2011); Second-team All-MAC (2009); CFN Freshman All-American

Career NFL statistics
- Receptions: 4
- Receiving yards: 68
- Kick Return Yards: 548
- Punt Return Yards: 251
- Stats at Pro Football Reference

Eric Anthony Page (born September 23, 1991) is an American former professional football player who was a wide receiver and return specialist for the Tampa Bay Buccaneers of the National Football League (NFL). He played college football for the Toledo Rockets, earning consensus All-American honors in 2010. The Denver Broncos signed him as an undrafted free agent following the 2012 NFL draft.

== College career ==
Page attended the University of Toledo, where he played for the Toledo Rockets football team from 2009 to 2011. As a freshman in 2009, he was voted to the freshman All-American team by College Football News. As a sophomore in 2010, he was a consensus first-team All-American. As a junior in 2011, he caught 112 passes in the regular season, becoming Toledo's all-time leading receiver, and he was named to the All-MAC first-team at three positions: as a wide receiver, as a kick returner, and as a punt returner. Following the 2011 season, he forwent his fourth year of collegiate eligibility and entered the 2012 NFL draft.

== Professional career ==
=== Denver Broncos ===
After the closure of the third day in the 2012 NFL draft, Page was left undrafted and he signed with the Denver Broncos for an undisclosed amount. The Broncos released him on July 25, 2012, after he tore his anterior cruciate ligament in practice.

=== Tampa Bay Buccaneers ===
On April 11, 2013, Page was signed by the Tampa Bay Buccaneers. He started all 16 games at the punt and kick return spot. The Buccaneers waived him on August 24, 2014. He was signed to the practice squad that October 8 and released again on October 27.

=== Edmonton Eskimos ===
Page signed with the Edmonton Eskimos of the Canadian Football League on February 13, 2015. He was released on June 14, following the first preseason game.
