= 2014 Minnesota Golden Gophers football team =

American college football season

2014 Minnesota Golden Gophers football

Citrus Bowl, L 17–33 vs. Missouri
- Conference: Big Ten Conference
- West Division
- Record: 8–5 (5–3 Big Ten)
- Head coach: Jerry Kill (4th season)
- Offensive coordinator: Matt Limegrover (4th season)
- Offensive scheme: Spread
- Defensive coordinator: Tracy Claeys (4th season)
- Base defense: 4–3
- Captains: Mitch Leidner; Cedric Thompson
- Home stadium: TCF Bank Stadium

2014 Big Ten Conference football standings
	Conf.			Overall
Team	W		L	W		L
East Division
No. 1 Ohio State x$#^	8	–	0	14	–	1
No. T–5 Michigan State	7	–	1	11	–	2
Maryland	4	–	4	7	–	6
Rutgers	3	–	5	8	–	5
Michigan	3	–	5	5	–	7
Penn State	2	–	6	7	–	6
Indiana	1	–	7	4	–	8
West Division
No. 13 Wisconsin x	7	–	1	11	–	3
Minnesota	5	–	3	8	–	5
Nebraska	5	–	3	9	–	4
Iowa	4	–	4	7	–	6
Illinois	3	–	5	6	–	7
Northwestern	3	–	5	5	–	7
Purdue	1	–	7	3	–	9
Championship: Ohio State 59, Wisconsin 0
# – College Football Playoff champion; ^ – College Football Playoff participant; $ – Conference champion; x – Division champion/co-champions; Rankings from AP Poll

The 2014 Minnesota Golden Gophers football team represented the University of Minnesota in the 2014 NCAA Division I FBS football season. They were led by fourth-year head coach Jerry Kill and played their home games at TCF Bank Stadium. They were a member of the West Division of the Big Ten Conference. They finished the season 8–5, 5–3 in Big Ten play to finish in a tie for second place in the West Division. They were invited to the Citrus Bowl where they lost to Missouri. It was their first New Year's Day bowl game appearance in 53 years, their previous was the 1962 Rose Bowl.

== Preseason ==
Heading into their fourth off-season, Jerry Kill's coaching staff at Minnesota suffered their first departure as linebackers and assistant head coach Bill Miller accepted the linebackers coach position at Florida State. After a brief coaching search, the Gophers named Mike Sherels the new linebackers coach. Sherels had an extensive history with the University of Minnesota, playing middle linebacker for the team from 2003-2007 and then serving as a special assistant and then defensive graduate assistant under Jerry Kill from 2011-2013.

The Gophers also saw quarterback Philip Nelson leave the team, announcing his transfer to Rutgers University shortly after the conclusion of the 2013 season. During the off season, Nelson was charged with first-degree assault after allegedly kicking Isaac Kolstad in the head during a late-night scuffle in downtown Mankato, Minnesota. These charges led to Nelson's dismissal from the Rutgers Scarlet Knights football program on May 14, 2014.

College recruiting
Name	Hometown	School	Height	Weight	40^{‡}	Commit date
Melvin Holland; WR	Ashburn, VA	Briar Woods HS	6 ft 2 in (1.88 m)	195 lb (88 kg)	4.5	Jan 27, 2014
Melvin Holland; WR	Recruit ratings: Scout: Rivals: ESPN:					
Jeff Jones; RB	Minneapolis, MN	Washburn HS	6 ft 0 in (1.83 m)	190 lb (86 kg)	4.7	Feb 2, 2013
Jeff Jones; RB	Recruit ratings: Scout: Rivals: (80)					
Connor Mayes; OL	Van Alstyne, TX	Van Alstyne HS	6 ft 5 in (1.96 m)	335 lb (152 kg)	5.4	Jun 17, 2013
Connor Mayes; OL	Recruit ratings: Scout: Rivals: ESPN:					
Overall recruit ranking:
Note: In many cases, Scout, Rivals, 247Sports, On3, and ESPN may conflict in their listings of height and weight.; In these cases, the average was taken. ESPN grades are on a 100-point scale.; Sources:

== Personnel ==
2014 Minnesota Golden Gophers football team roster
Players
Coaches
Offense

Pos.	#	Name	Class
WR	1	K. J. Maye	Jr
QB	2	Dimonic Roden-McKinzy	Fr
TE	3	Jerry Gibson	Fr
WR	4	Donovahn Jones	So
QB	5	Chris Streveler	Fr
QB	7	Mitch Leidner	So
WR	9	Eric Carter	Fr
WR	12	Will Reger	Fr
WR	13	Desmond Gant	Fr
WR	14	Isaac Fruechte	Sr
WR	14	Connor Cosgrove	Sr
QB	15	Conor Rhoda	Fr
RB	16	Jeff Jones	Fr
WR	17	Logan Hutton	Sr
QB	18	Jacques Perra	Fr
WR	19	Michael Conway	Fr
RB	20	Donnell Kirkwood	Sr
WR	21	Melvin Holland, Jr.	Fr
WR	22	Jeff Borchardt	Fr
WR	23	E. J. Sardinha	So
RB	24	Rodney Smith	Fr
WR	25	Devin Wright	Sr
WR	26	Brian Smith	Fr
RB	27	David Cobb	Sr
WR	29	Louis Tuszynski	So
RB	31	Cole Banham	Sr
RB	32	Berkey Edwards	Fr
FB	34	Jephete Matilus	Jr
RB	35	Rodrick Williams, Jr.	Jr
FB	41	Miles Thomas	Jr
FB	43	Tyler Hartmann	So
RB	37	Josh Parks	Fr
TE	39	Nate Wozniak	Fr
RB	44	Jacob Krisch	Jr
TE	47	Alex Bisch	Sr
TE	48	Matt Oldenkamp	Fr
TE	49	Noah Scarver	Fr
OL	52	Zac Epping	Sr
OL	53	Luke Rasmussen	Fr
OL	55	Connor Mayes	Fr
OL	58	Tommy Olson	Sr
OL	60	Matt Leidner	Fr
OL	62	Jared Weyler	Fr
OL	63	Jon Christenson	Jr
OL	65	Josh Champion	Jr
OL	66	Luke McAvoy	Jr
OL	67	Brian Bobek	Jr
OL	68	Isaac Hayes	So
OL	70	Chad Fahning	Fr
OL	71	Kyle McAvoy	Jr
OL	73	Joe Bjorklund	Jr
OL	74	Marek Lenkiewicz	Sr
OL	75	Ernie Heifort	Jr
OL	76	Alex Mayes	Fr
OL	77	Foster Bush	Jr
OL	78	Ben Lauer	So
OL	79	Jonah Pirsig	So
WR	80	Aaron Marmer	Jr
TE	81	Duke Anyanwu	So
TE	81	Nick Hart	Fr
WR	82	Drew Wolitarsky	So
TE	83	Drew Goodger	Sr
WR	84	Isaiah Gentry	Fr
TE	85	Lincoln Plsek	Jr
TE	86	Brandon Lingen	Fr
TE	88	Maxx Williams	So
WR	89	Connor Krizancic	Fr

Defense

Pos.	#	Name	Class
LB	1	De'Niro Laster	Fr
DB	2	Cedric Thompson	Sr
DB	3	Derrick Wells	Sr
LB	5	Damien Wilson	Sr
DB	6	Grayson Levine	Sr
DL	9	Alex Keith	Jr
DB	11	Antonio Johnson	Jr
DB	15	Marcus Jones	Sr
DB	16	Steven Montgomery	Jr
LB	18	Peter Westerhaus	Jr
LB	19	Cedric Dicke	So
DT	19	Gary Moore	Fr
DB	22	Craig James	Fr
LB	26	De'Vondre Campbell	Jr
DB	28	Jalen Myrick	So
DB	29	Briean Boddy-Calhoun	Jr
LB	30	Chris Wipson	Fr
DB	31	Eric Murray	Jr
DB	32	John McKelvey	So
DB	36	Cavonte Johnson	So
DB	40	Alexander Starks	Fr
LB	42	Dominic Schultz	Jr
DB	45	Adekunle Ayinde	Fr
DL	46	Cameron Botticelli	Sr
DB	48	Davis Alexander	Fr
LB	50	Jack Lynn	So
DL	52	Yoshoub Timms	So
DL	55	Theiren Cockran	Jr
LB	56	Nick Rallis	So
LB	57	Everett Williams	Fr
LB	59	Ray Dixon	Fr
DL	69	Justin Carr	Jr
DL	87	Gaelin Elmore	Fr
DL	90	Demaris Peppers	Fr
DE	91	Julien Kafo	Fr
DL	92	Robert Nondo-Lay	Jr
DL	93	Ben Perry	Sr
DL	94	Harold Legania	Sr
DL	95	Hendrick Ekpe	So
DT	96	Steven Richardson	Fr
DL	97	Scott Ekpe	Jr
DL	98	Michael Amaefula	Sr
DE	99	Andrew Stelter	Fr

Special teams

Pos.	#	Name	Class
K/P	18	Ryan Santoso	Fr
LS	25	Payton Jordahl	Fr
K	33	Andrew Harte	Fr
P	34	Logan McElfresh	Fr
P	37	Peter Mortell	Jr
K	38	Emmit Carpenter	Fr
LS	40	Jared Hartmann	Jr
P	41	Christian Eldred	Sr
K	42	Justin Juenemann	Fr
LS	49	Dave Ramlet	Sr

Head coach

- Jerry Kill

Coordinators/assistant coaches

- Tracy Claeys (associate head coach)
- Matt Limegrover (assistant head coach / offensive line)
- Brian Anderson (running backs)
- Jeff Phelps (defensive line)
- Pat Poore (wide receivers)
- Rob Reeves (H-Backs / tight ends)
- Jay Sawvel (defensive backs / special teams)
- Mike Sherels (linebackers)
- Jim Zebrowski (Quarterbacks / passing game coordinator)
- Ryan Maiuri (graduate assistant)

Legend

- (C) Team captain
- (S) Suspended
- (I) Ineligible
- Injured
- Redshirt

== Schedule ==
Date	Time	Opponent	Rank	Site	TV	Result	Attendance
August 28	6:00 pm	No. 16 (FCS) Eastern Illinois*		TCF Bank Stadium; Minneapolis, MN	BTN	W 42–20	44,344
September 6	2:30 pm	Middle Tennessee*		TCF Bank Stadium; Minneapolis, MN	BTN	W 35–24	47,223
September 13	3:00 pm	at TCU*		Amon G. Carter Stadium; Fort Worth, TX	FS1	L 7–30	43,958
September 20	3:00 pm	San Jose State*		TCF Bank Stadium; Minneapolis, MN	BTN	W 24–7	47,739
September 27	2:30 pm	at Michigan		Michigan Stadium; Ann Arbor, MI (Little Brown Jug)	ABC, ESPN2	W 30–14	102,926
October 11	11:00 am	Northwestern		TCF Bank Stadium; Minneapolis, MN	BTN	W 24–17	49,051
October 18	11:00 am	Purdue^{†}		TCF Bank Stadium; Minneapolis, MN	BTN	W 39–38	51,241
October 25	11:00 am	at Illinois		Memorial Stadium; Champaign, IL	ESPNU	L 24–28	44,437
November 8	11:00 am	Iowa		TCF Bank Stadium; Minneapolis, MN (rivalry)	ESPN2	W 51–14	49,680
November 15	11:00 am	No. 8 Ohio State	No. 25	TCF Bank Stadium; Minneapolis, MN	ABC	L 24–31	45,778
November 22	11:00 am	at No. 23 Nebraska	No. 25	Memorial Stadium; Lincoln, NE (rivalry)	ESPN	W 28–24	91,186
November 29	2:30 pm	at No. 14 Wisconsin	No. 18	Camp Randall Stadium; Madison, WI (rivalry)	BTN	L 24–34	80,341
January 1	12:00 pm	vs. No. 16 Missouri*	No. 25	Orlando Citrus Bowl Stadium; Orlando, FL (Citrus Bowl)	ABC	L 17–33	48,624
*Non-conference game; ^{†}Homecoming; Rankings from AP Poll and CFP Rankings after October 28 released prior to game; All times are in Central time

== Game summaries ==
=== Eastern Illinois ===
Team	1	2	3	4	Total
E. Illinois	0	0	0	20	20
• Minnesota	7	7	7	21	42

- Date: August 28
- Location: TCF Bank Stadium
- Game start: 7:00
- TV announcers (Big Ten Network): Eric Collins, Glen Mason, Jamie Hersch

=== Middle Tennessee ===
Team	1	2	3	4	Total
Mid Tennessee	0	0	17	7	24
• Minnesota	7	21	7	0	35

- Date: September 6
- Location: TCF Bank Stadium
- Game start: 3:30
- TV announcers (Big Ten Network): Anthony LaPanta, Glen Mason, Jamie Hersch

=== TCU ===
Team	1	2	3	4	Total
Minnesota	0	0	0	7	7
• TCU	10	14	6	0	30

- Date: September 13
- Location: Amon G. Carter Stadium
- Game start: 4:00
- TV announcers (FS1): Tim Brando, Brady Quinn

=== San Jose State ===
Team	1	2	3	4	Total
San Jose St	7	0	0	0	7
• Minnesota	10	7	0	7	24

- Date: September 20
- Location: TCF Bank Stadium
- Game start: 4:00
- TV announcers (Big Ten Network): Anthony LaPanta, Chuck Long, Jamie Hersch

=== Michigan ===
Team	1	2	3	4	Total
• Minnesota	0	10	17	3	30
Michigan	0	7	0	7	14

- Date: September 27
- Location: Michigan Stadium
- Game start: 3:00
- Elapsed time: 3:15
- Game attendance: 102,926
- Game weather: Sunny; about 75 °F (24 °C); wind 15–20 mph (24–32 km/h) NE
- Referee: J. McGinn
- TV announcers (ABC/ESPN2): Mike Patrick, Ed Cunningham, Jeannine Edwards

Scoring summary
Q2	11:10	MICH	Smith 10 yard run (Wile kick)	MICH 7–0
Q2	8:00	MINN	Leidner 10 yard run (Santoso kick)	Tie 7–7
Q2	:00	MINN	Santoso 24 yard field goal	MINN 10–7
Q3	6:56	MINN	Santoso 48 yard field goal	MINN 13–7
Q3	6:42	MINN	Campbell 30 yard interception return (Santoso kick)	MINN 20–7
Q3	2:52	MINN	M. Williams 1 yard pass from Leidner (Santoso kick)	MINN 27–7
Q4	12:50	MINN	Santoso 25 yard field goal	MINN 30–7
Q4	7:27	MICH	Gardner 3 yard run (Wile kick)	MINN 30–14

- David Cobb 32 Rush, 183 Yds

=== Northwestern ===
Team	1	2	3	4	Total
Northwestern	0	10	0	7	17
• Minnesota	7	7	0	10	24

- Date: October 11
- Location: TCF Bank Stadium
- Game start: 12:00
- TV announcers (Big Ten Network): Kevin Kugler, Glen Mason, Lisa Byington

=== Purdue ===
Team	1	2	3	4	Total
Purdue	14	17	7	0	38
• Minnesota	14	6	16	3	39

- Date: October 18
- Location: TCF Bank Stadium
- Game start: 12:00
- TV announcers (Big Ten Network): Eric Collins, Chuck Long, Rebecca Haarlow

=== Illinois ===
Team	1	2	3	4	Total
Minnesota	0	3	21	0	24
• Illinois	14	0	7	7	28

- Date: October 25
- Location: Memorial Stadium
- Game start: 12:00
- TV announcers (ESPNU): Clay Matvick, Anthony Becht

=== Iowa ===
Team	1	2	3	4	Total
Iowa	7	0	0	7	14
• Minnesota	7	28	7	9	51

- Date: November 8
- Location: TCF Bank Stadium
- Game start: 12:00
- Elapsed time: 3:19
- Game attendance: 49,680
- Game weather: Overcast; 38 °F (3 °C); wind 12 mph (19 km/h) NNE
- Referee: Shawn Smith
- TV announcers (ESPN2): Beth Mowins, Joey Galloway, Paul Carcaterra

Scoring summary
Q1	9:13	IOWA	Weisman 1 yard run (Koehn kick)	IOWA 7–0
Q1	5:38	MINN	Maye 9 yard run (Santoso kick)	Tie 7–7
Q2	12:59	MINN	D. Jones 44 yard pass from Leidner (Santoso kick)	MINN 14–7
Q2	6:49	MINN	M. Williams 9 yard pass from Leidner (Santoso kick)	MINN 21–7
Q2	3:51	MINN	Cobb 6 yard run (Santoso kick)	MINN 28–7
Q2	:31	MINN	M. Williams 4 yard pass from Leidner (Santoso kick)	MINN 35–7
Q3	9:13	MINN	M. Williams 3 yard pass from Leidner (Santoso kick)	MINN 42–7
Q4	11:34	MINN	R. Williams 1 yard run (kick failed)	MINN 48–7
Q4	6:28	MINN	Santoso 35 yard field goal	MINN 51–7
Q4	:14	IOWA	Stone 24 yard pass from Beathard (Koehn kick)	MINN 51–14

=== Ohio State ===
Team	1	2	3	4	Total
• Ohio St	14	3	7	7	31
Minnesota	0	14	0	10	24

- Date: November 15
- Location: TCF Bank Stadium
- Game start: 12:00
- TV announcers (ABC): Dave Pasch, Brian Griese, Tom Luginbill

=== Nebraska ===
Team	1	2	3	4	Total
• Minnesota	7	0	14	7	28
Nebraska	7	14	3	0	24

- Date: November 22
- Location: Memorial Stadium
- Game start: 12:00
- TV announcers (ESPN): Dave Pasch, Brian Griese, Tom Luginbill

=== Wisconsin ===
Team	1	2	3	4	Total
Minnesota	14	3	0	7	24
• Wisconsin	3	10	7	14	34

- Date: November 29
- Location: Camp Randall Stadium
- Game start: 3:30
- TV announcers (Big Ten Network): Kevin Kugler, Glen Mason, Lisa Byington

=== Citrus Bowl ===
Team	1	2	3	4	Total
• Missouri	0	10	9	14	33
Minnesota	7	0	10	0	17

- Date: January 1
- Location: Orlando Citrus Bowl Stadium
- Game start: 1:00
- TV announcers (ABC/ESPN Radio): Mike Patrick, Ed Cunningham, Jeannine Edwards/Dave Lamont, Tom Ramsey, Kayce Smith

== Rankings ==
Ranking movements Legend: ██ Increase in ranking ██ Decrease in ranking — = Not ranked RV = Received votes
	Week																
Poll	Pre	1	2	3	4	5	6	7	8	9	10	11	12	13	14	15	Final
AP	—	—	—	—	—	—	RV	RV	RV	—	—	RV	RV	22	RV	RV	RV
Coaches	RV	RV	RV	—	—	RV	RV	RV	24	RV	RV	RV	RV	22	25	RV	RV
CFP	Not released									—	—	25	25	18	—	25	Not released

== Players Drafted into the NFL ==
Round	Pick	Player	Position	NFL Club
2	55	Maxx Williams	TE	Baltimore Ravens
4	127	Damien Wilson	LB	Dallas Cowboys
5	138	David Cobb	RB	Tennessee Titans
5	150	Cedric Thompson	S	Miami Dolphins
