= 2014 Big Ten Conference football season =

- League: NCAA Division I FBS (Football Bowl Subdivision)
- Sport: Football
- Duration: August 28, 2014 through January 2015
- Teams: 14
- TV partner(s): ABC, ESPN2, ESPN Inc., Big Ten Network, FOX (championship game)

2015 NFL Draft
- Top draft pick: Brandon Scherff (Iowa)
- Picked by: Washington Redskins, 5th overall

Regular season
- Season MVP: Melvin Gordon
- Top scorer: Melvin Gordon (192 points)
- East Division champions: Ohio State
- West Division champions: Wisconsin

Championship Game
- Champions: Ohio State
- Runners-up: Wisconsin
- Finals MVP: Cardale Jones (QB), Ohio State

Football seasons
- 2013 2015

2014 Big Ten Conference football standings
	Conf.			Overall
Team	W		L	W		L
East Division
No. 1 Ohio State x$#^	8	–	0	14	–	1
No. T–5 Michigan State	7	–	1	11	–	2
Maryland	4	–	4	7	–	6
Rutgers	3	–	5	8	–	5
Michigan	3	–	5	5	–	7
Penn State	2	–	6	7	–	6
Indiana	1	–	7	4	–	8
West Division
No. 13 Wisconsin x	7	–	1	11	–	3
Minnesota	5	–	3	8	–	5
Nebraska	5	–	3	9	–	4
Iowa	4	–	4	7	–	6
Illinois	3	–	5	6	–	7
Northwestern	3	–	5	5	–	7
Purdue	1	–	7	3	–	9
Championship: Ohio State 59, Wisconsin 0
# – College Football Playoff champion; ^ – College Football Playoff participant; $ – Conference champion; x – Division champion/co-champions; Rankings from AP Poll

The 2014 Big Ten Conference football season was the 119th season of college football play for the Big Ten Conference and was a part of the 2014 NCAA Division I FBS football season. The conference began its season on Thursday, August 28, as Minnesota and Rutgers opened their seasons. The remainder of the teams in the conference began their season on August 30.

This was the Big Ten's first season with 14 teams as Maryland and Rutgers joined the conference. It was also the first season with the two seven-team divisions; when Maryland and Rutgers joined, the conference reorganized its divisions on a pure geographic basis. The six schools in the Central Time Zone were joined by Purdue in the new West Division, with the other schools making up the East Division. Under the new setup, the only protected cross-division rivalry game will be Indiana–Purdue.

Ohio State routed Wisconsin, 59–0, to win 2014 Big Ten Football Championship Game in Indianapolis. The Buckeyes then advanced to the first ever College Football Playoff where they defeated Alabama in the Sugar Bowl semifinal game and then defeated Oregon in the 2015 College Football Playoff National Championship to claim their eighth national championship in school history.

For the first time in several years, the Big Ten finished the season with two consensus top-five teams. In addition to Ohio State's consensus national title, Michigan State finished the season as the consensus #5 team in the nation.

== Rankings ==
		Pre	Wk 2	Wk 3	Wk 4	Wk 5	Wk 6	Wk 7	Wk 8	Wk 9	Wk 10	Wk 11	Wk 12	Wk 13	Wk 14	Wk 15	Wk 16	Final
Illinois	AP																	
Illinois	C																	
Illinois	CFP	Not released																
Indiana	AP					RV												
Indiana	C																	
Indiana	CFP	Not released																
Iowa	AP	RV	RV	RV					RV									
Iowa	C	RV	RV	RV		RV	RV	RV	RV			RV		RV	RV			
Iowa	CFP	Not released																
Maryland	AP						RV			RV								
Maryland	C																	
Maryland	CFP	Not released																
Michigan	AP	RV	RV															
Michigan	C	RV	RV	RV														
Michigan	CFP	Not released																
Michigan State	AP	8	7	13	11	9	10	8	8	8	8	7	12	10	10	7	7	5
Michigan State	C	8	6	13	11	9	10	8	6	5	5	6	12	9	8	7	7	5
Michigan State	CFP	Not released									8	8	12	11	10	8	8	
Minnesota	AP							RV	RV	RV			RV	RV	22	RV	RV	RV
Minnesota	C	RV	RV	RV			RV	RV	RV	24	RV	RV	RV	RV	22	25	RV	RV
Minnesota	CFP	Not released											25	25	18		25	
Nebraska	AP	22	19	RV	24	21	19	21	19	16	17	15	11	21	RV	25	25	RV
Nebraska	C	22	18	21	22	19	17	21	19	16	16	14	11	19	RV	23	22	RV
Nebraska	CFP	Not released									15	13	16	23				
Northwestern	AP	RV																
Northwestern	C	RV																
Northwestern	CFP	Not released																
Ohio State	AP	5	8	22	23	22	20	15	13	13	13	13	8	7	7	6	5	1
Ohio State	C	6	7	18	18	20	18	15	13	12	13	11	7	7	7	6	4	1
Ohio State	CFP	Not released									16	14	8	6	6	5	4	
Penn State	AP	RV	RV	RV	RV	RV		RV										
Penn State	C				RV	RV		RV										
Penn State	CFP	Not released																
Purdue	AP																	
Purdue	C																	
Purdue	CFP	Not released																
Rutgers	AP		RV					RV										
Rutgers	C		RV	RV				RV	RV									RV
Rutgers	CFP	Not released																
Wisconsin	AP	14	18	18	19	19	17	RV	RV		RV	25	22	14	14	11	17	13
Wisconsin	C	14	19	17	17	17	16	RV	RV	RV	RV	24	22	15	14	11	17	13
Wisconsin	CFP	Not released										25	20	16	14	13	18	

Legend
	Improvement in ranking
	Drop in ranking
	Not ranked previous week
	No change in ranking from previous week
RV	Received votes but were not ranked in Top 25 of poll

== Spring games ==
(Attendance in parentheses)

April 5

- Michigan (15,000)

April 11

- Maryland (8,319)

April 12

- Illinois (5,105)
- Indiana (9,231)
- Minnesota (5,000)
- Nebraska (61,772)
- Northwestern (N/A)
- Ohio State (61,058)
- Penn State (72,000)
- Purdue (7,175)
- Wisconsin (8,204)

April 26

- Iowa (20,400)
- Michigan State (35,000)
- Rutgers (11,500)

== Homecoming games ==
Team	Date	Opponent	HC game record	Attendance
Illinois	October 25	Minnesota	44–57–2	
Indiana	October 18	Michigan State	44–51–6	
Iowa	October 11	Indiana	55–42–5	
Maryland	October 18	Iowa		
Michigan	November 1	Indiana	86–27	
Michigan State	September 27	Wyoming	64–31–3	
Minnesota	October 18	Purdue	54–36–3	
Nebraska	September 27	Illinois	77–22–4	
Northwestern	October 18	Nebraska		
Ohio State	October 18	Rutgers	67–19–5	
Penn State	September 27	Northwestern	68–21–5	
Purdue	September 27	Iowa	50–37–4	
Rutgers	November 1	Wisconsin	52–28–2	
Wisconsin	October 25	Maryland		

== Schedule ==
Index to colors and formatting
Big Ten member won
Big Ten member lost
Big Ten teams in **bold**

All times Eastern time.

† denotes Homecoming game

=== Week 1 ===
Date	Time	Visiting team	Home team	Site	TV	Result	Attendance	Ref.
August 28	7:00 p.m.	Eastern Illinois	**Minnesota**	TCF Bank Stadium • Minneapolis, MN	BTN	**W** 42–20	44,344	
August 28	10:00 p.m.	**Rutgers**	Washington State	CenturyLink Field • Seattle, WA	FS1	**W** 41–38	30,927	
August 29	7:30 p.m.	Jacksonville State	No. 8 **Michigan State**	Spartan Stadium • East Lansing, MI	BTN	**W** 45–7	75,127	
August 30	8:30 a.m.	Central Florida	**Penn State**	Croke Park • Dublin, Ireland	ESPN2	**W** 26–24	53,304	
August 30	12:00 p.m.	Youngstown State	**Illinois**	Memorial Stadium • Champaign, IL	BTN	**W** 28–17	36,234	
August 30	12:00 p.m.	Indiana State	**Indiana**	Memorial Stadium • Bloomington, IN	ESPNEWS	**W** 28–10	38,006	
August 30	12:00 p.m.	Northern Iowa	**Iowa**	Kinnick Stadium • Iowa City, IA	BTN	**W** 31–23	66,805	
August 30	12:00 p.m.	Appalachian State	**Michigan**	Michigan Stadium • Ann Arbor, MI	ESPN2	**W** 52–14	106,811	
August 30	12:00 p.m.	No. 5 **Ohio State**	Navy	M&T Bank Stadium • Baltimore, MD	CBSSN	**W** 34–17	57,579	
August 30	12:00 p.m.	Western Michigan	**Purdue**	Ross–Ade Stadium • West Lafayette, IN	ESPNU	**W** 43–34	37,031	
August 30	3:30 p.m.	James Madison	**Maryland**	Byrd Stadium • College Park, MD	BTN	**W** 52–7	45,080	
August 30	3:30 p.m.	Florida Atlantic	No. 22 **Nebraska**	Memorial Stadium • Lincoln, NE	BTN	**W** 55–7	91,441	
August 30	3:30 p.m.	California	**Northwestern**	Ryan Field • Evanston, IL	ABC / ESPN2	**L** 24–31	34,228	
August 30	9:00 p.m.	No. 14 **Wisconsin**	No. 13 LSU	NRG Stadium • Houston, TX	ESPN	**L** 28–24	71,599	
^{#}Rankings from AP Poll released prior to game. All times are in Eastern Time.

=== Week 2 ===
Date	Time	Visiting team	Home team	Site	TV	Result	Attendance	Ref.
Sept. 6	12:00 p.m.	Western Kentucky	**Illinois**	Memorial Stadium • Champaign, IL	BTN	**W** 42–34	38,561	
Sept. 6	12:00 p.m.	McNeese State	No. 19 **Nebraska**	Memorial Stadium • Lincoln, NE	ESPNU	**W** 31–24	91,082	
Sept. 6	12:00 p.m.	Akron	**Penn State**	Beaver Stadium • University Park, PA	ABC / ESPN2	**W** 21–3	97,354	
Sept. 6	12:00 p.m.	Central Michigan	**Purdue**	Ross–Ade Stadium • West Lafayette, IN	ESPNEWS	**L** 38–17	36,410	
Sept. 6	12:00 p.m.	Howard	**Rutgers**	High Point Solutions Stadium • Piscataway, NJ	BTN	**W** 38–25	48,040	
Sept. 6	12:00 p.m.	Western Illinois	No. 18 **Wisconsin**	Camp Randall Stadium • Madison, WI	BTN	**W** 37–3	77,125	
Sept. 6	3:30 p.m.	Ball State	**Iowa**	Kinnick Stadium • Iowa City, IA	ESPN2	**W** 17–13	64,210	
Sept. 6	3:30 p.m.	**Maryland**	South Florida	Raymond James Stadium • Tampa, FL	CBSSN	**W** 24–17	28,915	
Sept. 6	3:30 p.m.	Middle Tennessee	**Minnesota**	TCF Bank Stadium • Minneapolis, MN	BTN	**W** 35–24	47,223	
Sept. 6	3:30 p.m.	Northern Illinois	**Northwestern**	Ryan Field • Evanston, IL	BTN	**L** 23–15	41,139	
Sept. 6	6:30 p.m.	No. 7 **Michigan State**	No. 3 Oregon	Autzen Stadium • Eugene, OR	FOX	**L** 46–27	59,456	
Sept. 6	7:30 p.m.	**Michigan**	No. 16 Notre Dame	Notre Dame Stadium • Notre Dame, IN (Michigan-Notre Dame rivalry)	NBC	**L** 31–0	80,795	
Sept. 6	8:00 p.m.	Virginia Tech	No. 8 **Ohio State**	Ohio Stadium • Columbus, OH	ESPN	**L** 35–21	107,517	
^{#}Rankings from AP Poll released prior to game. All times are in Eastern Time.

Date	Bye Week
Sept. 6	Indiana

=== Week 3 ===
Date	Time	Visiting team	Home team	Site	TV	Result	Attendance	Ref.
September 13	12:00 p.m.	Kent State	No. 22 **Ohio State**	Ohio Stadium • Columbus, OH	ABC / ESPN2	**W** 66–0	104,404	
September 13	12:00 p.m.	**Indiana**	Bowling Green	Doyt Perry Stadium • Bowling Green, OH	ESPNU	**L** 45–42	23,717	
September 13	12:00 p.m.	West Virginia	**Maryland**	Byrd Stadium • College Park, MD (Maryland-WVU rivalry)	BTN	**L** 40–37	48,154	
September 13	3:30 p.m.	Iowa State	**Iowa**	Kinnick Stadium • Iowa City, IA (Cy-Hawk Trophy)	ESPN	**L** 20–17	70,585	
September 13	3:30 p.m.	Miami (OH)	**Michigan**	Michigan Stadium • Ann Arbor, MI	BTN	**W** 34–10	102,824	
September 13	4:00 p.m.	**Illinois**	Washington	Husky Stadium • Seattle, WA	FOX	**L** 44–19	62,325	
September 13	4:00 p.m.	**Minnesota**	Texas Christian	Amon G. Carter Stadium • Fort Worth, TX	FS1	**L** 30–7	43,958	
September 13	7:30 p.m.	**Purdue**	No. 11 Notre Dame	Lucas Oil Stadium • Indianapolis, IN (Shillelagh Trophy)	NBC	**L** 30–14	56,832	
September 13	8:00 p.m.	**Penn State**	**Rutgers**	High Point Solutions Stadium • Piscataway, NJ	BTN	**PSU** 13–10	53,774	
September 13	10:30 p.m.	**Nebraska**	Fresno State	Bulldog Stadium • Fresno, CA	CBSSN	**W** 55–19	41,031	
^{#}Rankings from AP Poll released prior to game. All times are in Eastern Time.

Date	Bye Week		
September 13	#13 Michigan State	Northwestern	#18 Wisconsin

=== Week 4 ===
Date	Time	Visiting team	Home team	Site	TV	Result	Attendance	Ref.
September 20	12:00 p.m.	**Iowa**	Pittsburgh	Heinz Field • Pittsburgh, PA	ESPNU	**W** 24–20	48,895	
September 20	12:00 p.m.	Bowling Green	No. 19 **Wisconsin**	Camp Randall Stadium • Madison, WI	ESPN2	**W** 68–17	79,849	
September 20	12:00 p.m.	Eastern Michigan	No. 11 **Michigan State**	Spartan Stadium • East Lansing, MI	BTN	**W** 73–14	73,846	
September 20	12:00 p.m.	Southern Illinois	**Purdue**	Ross–Ade Stadium • West Lafayette, IN	BTN	**W** 35–13	31,434	
September 20	12:00 p.m.	Western Illinois	**Northwestern**	Ryan Field • Evanston, IL	ESPNEWS	**W** 24–7	32,016	
September 20	12:30 p.m.	**Maryland**	Syracuse	Carrier Dome • Syracuse, NY	ACC Network	**W** 34–20	40,511	
September 20	3:30 p.m.	**Rutgers**	Navy	Navy–Marine Corps Memorial Stadium • Annapolis, MD	CBSSN	**W** 31–24	33,655	
September 20	3:30 p.m.	Utah	**Michigan**	Michigan Stadium • Ann Arbor, MI	ABC / ESPN2	**L** 26–10	103,890	
September 20	4:00 p.m.	**Indiana**	No. 18 Missouri	Faurot Field • Columbia, MO	SEC Network	**W** 31–27	66,455	
September 20	4:00 p.m.	Massachusetts	**Penn State**	Beaver Stadium • University Park, PA	BTN	**W** 48–7	99,155	
September 20	4:00 p.m.	San Jose State	**Minnesota**	TCF Bank Stadium • Minneapolis, MN	BTN	**W** 24–7	47,739	
September 20	4:00 p.m.	Texas State	**Illinois**	Memorial Stadium • Champaign, IL	ESPNEWS	**W** 42–35	41,019	
September 20	8:00 p.m.	Miami (FL)	No. 24 **Nebraska**	Memorial Stadium • Lincoln, NE	ESPN2	**W** 41–31	91,585	
^{#}Rankings from AP Poll released prior to game. All times are in Eastern Time.

Date	Bye Week
September 20	#23 Ohio State

=== Week 5 ===
Date	Time	Visiting team	Home team	Site	TV	Result	Attendance	Ref.
September 27†	12:00 p.m.	Wyoming	No. 9 **Michigan State**	Spartan Stadium • East Lansing, MI	ESPN2	**W** 56–14	74,227	
September 27†	12:00 p.m.	**Northwestern**	**Penn State**	Beaver Stadium • University Park, PA	BTN	**NW** 29–6	102,910	
September 27†	12:00 p.m.	**Iowa**	**Purdue**	Ross–Ade Stadium • West Lafayette, IN	BTN	**IOWA** 24–10	36,603	
September 27	12:00 p.m.	South Florida	No. 19 **Wisconsin**	Camp Randall Stadium • Madison, WI	ESPNU	**W** 27–10	78,111	
September 27	12:00 p.m.	Tulane	**Rutgers**	High Point Solutions Stadium • Piscataway, NJ	ESPNEWS	**W** 31–6	48,361	
September 27	12:30 p.m.	**Maryland**	**Indiana**	Memorial Stadium • Bloomington, IN	BTN	**MD** 37–15	44,313	
September 27	3:30 p.m.	**Minnesota**	**Michigan**	Michigan Stadium • Ann Arbor, MI (Little Brown Jug)	ABC / ESPN2	**MIN** 30–14	102,926	
September 27	6:00 p.m.	Cincinnati	No. 22 **Ohio State**	Ohio Stadium • Columbus, OH	BTN	**W** 50–28	108,362	
September 27†	9:00 p.m.	**Illinois**	No. 21 **Nebraska**	Memorial Stadium • Lincoln, NE	BTN	**NEB** 45–14	91,255	
^{#}Rankings from AP Poll released prior to game. All times are in Eastern Time.

=== Week 6 ===
Date	Time	Visiting team	Home team	Site	TV	Result	Attendance	Ref.
October 4	12:00 p.m.	**Purdue**	**Illinois**	Memorial Stadium • Champaign, IL (Purdue Cannon)	ESPN2	**PUR** 38–27	45,046	
October 4	12:00 p.m.	No. 20 **Ohio State**	**Maryland**	Byrd Stadium • College Park, MD	ABC	**OSU** 52–24	51,802	
October 4	2:30 p.m.	North Texas	**Indiana**	Memorial Stadium • Bloomington, IN	BTN	**W** 49–24	40,457	
October 4	3:30 p.m.	No. 17 **Wisconsin**	**Northwestern**	Ryan Field • Evanston, IL	ESPN2	**NW** 20–14	42,013	
October 4	7:00 p.m.	**Michigan**	**Rutgers**	High Point Solutions Stadium • Piscataway, NJ	BTN	**RUT** 26–24	53,327	
October 4	8:00 p.m.	No. 19 **Nebraska**	No. 10 **Michigan State**	Spartan Stadium • East Lansing, MI	ABC	**MSU** 27–24	75,923	
^{#}Rankings from AP Poll released prior to game. All times are in Eastern Time.

Date	Bye Week		
October 4	Iowa	Minnesota	Penn State

=== Week 7 ===
Date	Time	Visiting team	Home team	Site	TV	Result	Attendance	Ref.
October 11†	12:00 p.m.	**Indiana**	**Iowa**	Kinnick Stadium • Iowa City, IA	ESPNU	**IOWA** 45–29	68,590	
October 11	12:00 p.m.	**Illinois**	**Wisconsin**	Camp Randall Stadium • Madison, WI	ESPN2	**WIS** 38–28	80,341	
October 11	12:00 p.m.	**Northwestern**	**Minnesota**	TCF Bank Stadium • Minneapolis, MN	BTN	**MIN** 24–17	49,051	
October 11	3:30 p.m.	No. 8 **Michigan State**	**Purdue**	Ross–Ade Stadium • West Lafayette, IN	ABC / ESPN2	**MSU** 45–31	40,217	
October 11	7:00 p.m.	**Penn State**	**Michigan**	Michigan Stadium • Ann Arbor, MI	ESPN2	**MICH** 18–13	113,085	
^{#}Rankings from AP Poll released prior to game. All times are in Eastern Time.

Date	Bye Week			
October 11	Maryland	#21 Nebraska	#15 Ohio State	Rutgers

=== Week 8 ===
Date	Time	Visiting team	Home team	Site	TV	Result	Attendance	Ref.
October 18†	12:00 p.m.	**Purdue**	**Minnesota**	TCF Bank Stadium • Minneapolis, MN	BTN	**MIN** 39–38	51,241	
October 18†	12:00 p.m.	**Iowa**	**Maryland**	Byrd Stadium • College Park, MD	ESPN2	**MD** 38–31	48,373	
October 18†	3:30 p.m.	No. 8 **Michigan State**	**Indiana**	Memorial Stadium • Bloomington, IN (Old Brass Spittoon)	ESPN	**MSU** 56–17	44,403	
October 18†	3:30 p.m.	**Rutgers**	No. 13 **Ohio State**	Ohio Stadium • Columbus, OH	ABC / ESPN2	**OSU** 56–17	106,795	
October 18†	7:30 p.m.	No. 19 **Nebraska**	**Northwestern**	Ryan Field • Evanston, IL	BTN	**NEB** 38–17	47,330	
^{#}Rankings from AP Poll released prior to game. All times are in Eastern Time.

Date	Bye Week			
October 18	Illinois	Michigan	Penn State	Wisconsin

=== Week 9 ===
Date	Time	Visiting team	Home team	Site	TV	Result	Attendance	Ref.
October 25†	12:00 p.m.	**Minnesota**	**Illinois**	Memorial Stadium • Champaign, IL	ESPNU	**ILL** 28–24	44,437	
October 25†	12:00 p.m.	**Maryland**	**Wisconsin**	Camp Randall Stadium • Madison, WI	BTN	**WIS** 52–7	80,336	
October 25	12:00 p.m.	**Rutgers**	No. 16 **Nebraska**	Memorial Stadium • Lincoln, NE	ESPN2	**NEB** 42–24	91,088	
October 25	3:30 p.m.	**Michigan**	No. 8 **Michigan State**	Spartan Stadium • East Lansing, MI (Paul Bunyan Trophy)	ABC	**MSU** 35–11	76,331	
October 25	8:00 p.m.	No. 13 **Ohio State**	**Penn State**	Beaver Stadium • University Park, PA (OSU-PSU rivalry)	ABC	**OSU** 31–24 ^{2OT}	107,895	
^{#}Rankings from AP Poll released prior to game. All times are in Eastern Time.

Date	Bye Week			
October 25	Indiana	Iowa	Northwestern	Purdue

=== Week 10 ===
Date	Time	Visiting team	Home team	Site	TV	Result	Attendance	Ref.
November 1†	12:00 p.m.	Wisconsin	**Rutgers**	High Point Solutions Stadium • Piscataway, NJ	ESPN	**WIS** 37–0	52,797	
November 1	12:00 p.m.	Northwestern	**Iowa**	Kinnick Stadium • Iowa City, IA	BTN	**IOWA** 48–7	66,887	
November 1	12:00 p.m.	Maryland	**Penn State**	Beaver Stadium • University Park, PA (Maryland-PSU rivalry)	ESPN2	**MD** 20–19	103,969	
November 1†	3:30 p.m.	Indiana	**Michigan**	Michigan Stadium • Ann Arbor, MI	BTN	**MICH** 34–10	103,111	
November 1	3:30 p.m.	Purdue	No. 17 **Nebraska**	Memorial Stadium • Lincoln, NE	ABC / ESPN2	**NEB** 35–14	91,107	
November 1	8:00 p.m.	Illinois	No. 13 **Ohio State**	Ohio Stadium • Columbus, OH (Illibuck)	ABC	**OSU** 55–14	106,961	
^{#}Rankings from AP Poll released prior to game. All times are in Eastern Time.

Date	Bye Week	
November 1	#8 Michigan State	Minnesota

=== Week 11 ===
Date	Time	Visiting team	Home team	Site	TV	Result	Attendance	Ref.
November 8	12:00 p.m.	**Penn State**	**Indiana**	Memorial Stadium • Bloomington, IN	BTN	**PSU** 13–7	42,683	
November 8	12:00 p.m.	**Iowa**	**Minnesota**	TCF Bank Stadium • Minneapolis, MN (Floyd of Rosedale)	ESPN2	**MINN** 51–14	49,680	
November 8	12:00 p.m.	No. 25 **Wisconsin**	**Purdue**	Ross–Ade Stadium • West Lafayette, IN	ESPNU	**WIS** 34–16	35,068	
November 8	3:30 p.m.	**Michigan**	**Northwestern**	Ryan Field • Evanston, IL	ESPN2	**MICH** 10–9	42,429	
November 8	8:00 p.m.	No. 13 **Ohio State**	No. 7 **Michigan State**	Spartan Stadium • East Lansing, MI	ABC	**OSU** 49–37	76,409	
^{#}Rankings from AP Poll released prior to game. All times are in Eastern Time.

Date	Bye Week			
November 8	Illinois	Maryland	#15 Nebraska	Rutgers

=== Week 12 ===
Date	Time	Visiting team	Home team	Site	TV	Result	Attendance	Ref.
November 15	12:00 p.m.	**Iowa**	**Illinois**	Memorial Stadium • Champaign, IL	BTN	**IOWA** 30–14	50,373	
November 15	12:00 p.m.	No. 8 **Ohio State**	**Minnesota**	TCF Bank Stadium • Minneapolis, MN	ABC	**OSU** 31–24	45,778	
November 15	12:00 p.m.	Temple	**Penn State**	Beaver Stadium • University Park, PA	ESPN2	**W** 30–13	100,173	
November 15	3:30 p.m.	No. 11 **Nebraska**	No. 22 **Wisconsin**	Camp Randall Stadium • Madison, WI (Freedom Trophy)	ABC	**WIS** 59–24	80,539	
November 15	3:30 p.m.	**Northwestern**	No. 15 Notre Dame	Notre Dame Stadium • Notre Dame (Shillealagh Trophy)	NBC	**W** 43–40 ^{OT}	80,795	
November 15	3:30 p.m.	**Indiana**	**Rutgers**	High Point Solutions Stadium • Piscataway, NJ	BTN	**RUT** 45–23	47,492	
November 15	8:00 p.m.	No. 12 **Michigan State**	**Maryland**	Byrd Stadium • College Park, MD	BTN	**MSU** 37–15	51,802	
^{#}Rankings from AP Poll released prior to game. All times are in Eastern Time.

Date	Bye Week	
November 15	Michigan	Purdue

=== Week 13 ===
Date	Time	Visiting team	Home team	Site	TV	Result	Attendance	Ref.
November 22	12:00 p.m.	**Northwestern**	**Purdue**	Ross–Ade Stadium • West Lafayette, IN	ESPNU	**NW** 38–14	30,117	
November 22	12:00 p.m.	**Penn State**	**Illinois**	Memorial Stadium • Champaign, IL	ESPN2	**ILL** 16–14	35,172	
November 22	12:00 p.m.	**Indiana**	No. 7 **Ohio State**	Ohio Stadium • Columbus, OH	BTN	**OSU** 42–27	101,426	
November 22	12:00 p.m.	**Rutgers**	No. 10 **Michigan State**	Spartan Stadium • East Lansing, MI	BTN	**MSU** 45–3	70,902	
November 22	12:00 p.m.	**Minnesota**	No. 21 **Nebraska**	Memorial Stadium • Lincoln, NE	ESPN	**MIN** 28–24	91,186	
November 22	3:30 p.m.	No. 14 **Wisconsin**	**Iowa**	Kinnick Stadium • Iowa City, IA (Heartland Trophy)	ABC / ESPN2	**WIS** 26–24	68,610	
November 22	3:30 p.m.	**Maryland**	**Michigan**	Michigan Stadium • Ann Arbor, MI	BTN	**MD** 23–16	101,717	
^{#}Rankings from AP Poll released prior to game. All times are in Eastern Time.

=== Week 14 ===
Date	Time	Visiting team	Home team	Site	TV	Result	Attendance	Ref.
November 28	12:00 p.m.	**Nebraska**	**Iowa**	Kinnick Stadium • Iowa City, IA (Heroes Trophy)	ABC	**NEB** 37–34 ^{OT}	66,897	
November 29	12:00 p.m.	**Illinois**	**Northwestern**	Ryan Field • Evanston, IL (Land of Lincoln Trophy)	ESPNU	**ILL** 47–33	31,137	
November 29	12:00 p.m.	**Purdue**	**Indiana**	Memorial Stadium • Bloomington, IN (Old Oaken Bucket)	BTN	**IND** 23–16	40,079	
November 29	12:00 p.m.	**Michigan**	No. 7 **Ohio State**	Ohio Stadium • Columbus, OH (The Game)	ABC	**OSU** 42–28	108,610	
November 29	3:30 p.m.	**Rutgers**	**Maryland**	Byrd Stadium • College Park, MD	ESPNU	**RUT** 41–38	36,673	
November 29	3:30 p.m.	No. 10 **Michigan State**	**Penn State**	Beaver Stadium • University Park, PA (Land Grant Trophy)	ABC / ESPN2	**MSU** 34–10	99,902	
November 29	3:30 p.m.	No. 22 **Minnesota**	No. 14 **Wisconsin**	Camp Randall Stadium • Madison, WI (Paul Bunyan's Axe)	BTN	**WIS** 34–24	80,341	
^{#}Rankings from AP Poll released prior to game. All times are in Eastern Time.

=== Big Ten Championship Game ===
Date	Time	Visiting team	Home team	Site	TV	Result	Attendance	Ref.
December 6	8:17 p.m.	No. 11 Wisconsin	No. 6 Ohio State	Lucas Oil Stadium • Indianapolis, IN	FOX	**OSU** 59–0	60,229	
^{#}Rankings from AP Poll released prior to game. All times are in Eastern Time.

== Bowl games ==
Big Ten bowl games for the 2014 season are:

Bowl game	Date	Site	Television	Time (EST)	Big Ten team	Opponent	Score	Attendance	Ref.
Heart of Dallas Bowl	December 26	Cotton Bowl • Dallas, TX	ESPN	1:00 p.m.	Illinois	Louisiana Tech	LT 35–18	31,297	
Quick Lane Bowl	December 26	Ford Field • Detroit, MI	ESPN	4:30 p.m.	Rutgers	North Carolina	RUT 40–21	23,876	
Pinstripe Bowl	December 27	Yankee Stadium • New York, NY	ESPN	4:30 p.m.	Penn State	Boston College	PSU 31–30 (OT)	49,012	
Holiday Bowl	December 27	Qualcomm Stadium • San Diego, CA	ESPN	8:00 p.m.	#25 Nebraska	#24 USC	USC 45–42	55,789	
Foster Farms Bowl	December 30	Levi's Stadium • Santa Clara, CA	ESPN	10:00 p.m.	Maryland	Stanford	STAN 45–21	34,780	
Outback Bowl	January 1	Raymond James Stadium • Tampa, FL	ESPN2	12:00 p.m.	#17 Wisconsin	#19 Auburn	WIS 34–31 (OT)	44,023	
Citrus Bowl	January 1	Florida Citrus Bowl • Orlando, FL	ABC	1:00 p.m.	Minnesota	#16 Missouri	MIZZ 33–17	48,624	
TaxSlayer Bowl	January 2	EverBank Field • Jacksonville, FL	ESPN	3:20 p.m.	Iowa	Tennessee	TENN 45–28	56,310	
New Year's Six Bowls
Cotton Bowl	January 1	AT&T Stadium • Arlington, TX	ESPN	12:30 p.m.	#7 Michigan State	#4 Baylor	MSU 42–41	71,464	
College Football Playoff
Sugar Bowl (Semifinal)	January 1	Mercedes-Benz Superdome • New Orleans, LA	ESPN	9:00 p.m.	#5 Ohio State	#1 Alabama	OSU 42–35	74,682	
CFP National Championship	January 12	AT&T Stadium • Arlington, TX	ESPN	8:30 p.m.	#5 Ohio State	#3 Oregon	OSU 42–20	85,689	

Rankings are from AP Poll. All times Eastern Time Zone.

== Records against FBS conferences ==
2014 records against FBS conferences:

Through games of January 12, 2015

Conference	Record
ACC	5–1
American	6–0
Big 12	1–3
C-USA	4–1
Independents	3–2
MAC	8–3
Mountain West	3–0
Pac-12	2–6
SEC	3–3
Sun Belt	2–0
Total	37–19

== Players of the Week ==
Week	Offensive			Defensive			Special Teams			Freshman		
Week	Player	Position	Team	Player	Position	Team	Player	Position	Team	Player	Position	Team
Week 1	Ameer Abdullah	RB	NEB	Johnathan Aiken	S	RUT	Sam Ficken	PK	PSU	J. T. Barrett	QB	OSU
Week 1	Ameer Abdullah	RB	NEB	Johnathan Aiken	S	RUT	Sam Ficken	PK	PSU	DaeSean Hamilton	WR	PSU
Week 2	Wes Lunt	QB	ILL	Drew Ott	DE	IOWA	Sam Foltz	P	NEB	Mike Dudek	WR	ILL
Week 2	David Cobb	RB	MIN	Drew Ott	DE	IOWA	Sam Foltz	P	NEB	Mike Dudek	WR	ILL
Week 3	J.T. Barrett	QB	OSU	Trevor Williams	CB	PSU	De'Mornay Pierson-El	PR	NEB	J.T. Barrett	QB	OSU
Week 4	Ameer Abdullah	RB	NEB	William Likely	CB	MD	Chris Gradone	P	NW	Tegray Scales	LB	IND
Week 4	Melvin Gordon	RB	WIS	William Likely	CB	MD	Chris Gradone	P	NW	Chris Streveler	QB	MINN
Week 5	Ameer Abdullah	RB	NEB	Cole Farrand	LB	MD	Griffin Oakes	PK	IND	Anthony Walker	LB	NW
Week 5	Ameer Abdullah	RB	NEB	Cole Farrand	LB	MD	Griffin Oakes	PK	IND	J.T. Barrett	QB	OSU
Week 6	Gary Nova	QB	RUT	Godwin Igwebuike	S	NW	Kemoko Turay	DE	RUT	Godwin Igwebuike	S	NW
Week 7	Tevin Coleman	RB	IND	Jake Ryan	LB	MICH	Matt Wile	PK	MICH	Justin Jackson	RB	NW
Week 7	Tevin Coleman	RB	IND	Damien Wilson	LB	MINN	Jalen Myrick	KR	MINN	Justin Jackson	RB	NW
Week 8	J.T. Barrett	QB	OSU	Cedric Thompson	S	MINN	Ryan Santoso	PK	MINN	J.T. Barrett	QB	OSU
Week 9	Ameer Abdullah	RB	NEB	Joey Bosa	DE	OSU	Justin DuVernois	P	ILL	DaeSean Hamilton	WR	PSU
Week 10	Corey Clement	RB	WIS	Louis Trinca-Pasat	DT	IOWA	Sam Ficken	PK	PSU	Akrum Wadley	RB	IOWA
Week 10	Corey Clement	RB	WIS	Jake Ryan	LB	MICH	Sam Ficken	PK	PSU	Akrum Wadley	RB	IOWA
Week 11	J.T. Barrett	QB	OSU	Vince Biegel	LB	WIS	Paul Griggs	PK	PUR	J.T. Barrett	QB	OSU
Week 12	Melvin Gordon	RB	WIS	Joe Schobert	LB	WIS	Jack Mitchell	PK	NW	J.T. Barrett	QB	OSU
Week 13	Melvin Gordon	RB	WIS	Briean Boddy-Calhoun	CB	MINN	David Reisner	PK	ILL	Jalin Marshall	WR/PR	OSU
Week 13	Melvin Gordon	RB	WIS	Ibraheim Campbell	S	NW	Brad Craddock	PK	MD	Jalin Marshall	WR/PR	OSU
Week 14	Gary Nova	QB	RUT	Nate Gerry	S	NEB	De'Mornay Pierson-El	PR	NEB	J.T. Barrett	QB	OSU
Week 14	Gary Nova	QB	RUT	Nate Gerry	S	NEB	R.J. Shelton	KR	MSU	J.T. Barrett	QB	OSU

== Players of the Year ==
2014 Big Ten Player of the Year awards

Award	Player	School
Graham-George Offensive Player of the Year	Melvin Gordon	Wisconsin
Nagurski-Woodson Defensive Player of the Year	Joey Bosa	Ohio State
Thompson-Randle El Freshman of the Year	J.T. Barrett	Ohio State
Griese-Brees Quarterback of the Year	J.T. Barrett	Ohio State
Richter-Howard Receiver of the Year	Tony Lippett	Michigan State
Ameche-Dayne Running Back of the Year	Melvin Gordon	Wisconsin
Kwalick-Clark Tight End of the Year	Maxx Williams	Minnesota
Rimington-Pace Offensive Lineman of the Year	Brandon Scherff	Iowa
Smith-Brown Defensive Lineman of the Year	Joey Bosa	Ohio State
Butkus-Fitzgerald Linebacker of the Year	Mike Hull	Penn State
Tatum-Woodson Defensive Back of the Year	Kurtis Drummond	Michigan State
Bakken-Andersen Kicker of the Year	Brad Craddock	Maryland
Eddleman-Fields Punter of the Year	Peter Mortell	Minnesota
Dave McClain/Hayes-Schembechler Coach of the Year	Jerry Kill	Minnesota

== All-Conference Players ==
Coaches All-Conference Selections

Unanimous selections in ALL CAPS

Position	Player	Class	Team
First Team Offense (Coaches)
QB	J.T. Barrett	FR	Ohio State
RB	Tevin Coleman	JR	Indiana
RB	MELVIN GORDON	JR	Wisconsin
WR	Tony Lippett	SR	Michigan State
WR	Kenny Bell	SR	Nebraska
TE	Maxx Williams	SO	Minnesota
C	Jack Allen	JR	Michigan State
OG	Pat Elflein	SO	Ohio State
OG	Kyle Costigan	SR	Wisconsin
OT	Brandon Scherff	SR	Iowa
OT	Rob Havenstein	SR	Wisconsin
First Team Defense (Coaches)
DL	Shilique Calhoun	JR	Michigan State
DL	Randy Gregory	JR	Nebraska
DL	JOEY BOSA	SO	Ohio State
DL	Anthony Zettel	SR	Penn State
LB	Jake Ryan	SR	Michigan
LB	Mike Hull	SR	Penn State
LB	Derek Landisch	SR	Wisconsin
DB	William Likely	SO	Maryland
DB	Kurtis Drummond	SR	Michigan State
DB	Trae Waynes	JR	Michigan State
DB	Doran Grant	SR	Ohio State
First Team Special Teams (Coaches)
PK	Brad Craddock	JR	Maryland
P	Peter Mortell	JR	Minnesota

Position	Player	Class	Team
Second Team Offense (Coaches)
QB	Connor Cook	JR	Michigan State
RB	David Cobb	SR	Minnesota
RB	Ameer Abdullah	SR	Nebraska
WR	Stefon Diggs	JR	Maryland
WR	Devin Funchess	JR	Michigan
TE	Jeff Heuerman	SR	Ohio State
C	Austin Blythe	JR	Iowa
OG	Travis Jackson	SR	Michigan State
OG	Zac Epping	SR	Minnesota
OT	Taylor Decker	JR	Ohio State
OT	Jack Conklin	SO	Michigan State
Second Team Defense (Coaches)
DL	Carl Davis	SR	Iowa
DL	Louis Trinca-Pasat	SR	Iowa
DL	Maliek Collins	SO	Nebraska
DL	Michael Bennett	SR	Ohio State
LB	Quinton Alston	SR	Iowa
LB	Taiwan Jones	SR	Michigan State
LB	Damien Wilson	SR	Minnesota
DB	Briean Boddy-Calhoun	JR	Minnesota
DB	Eric Murray	JR	Minnesota
DB	Ibraheim Campbell	SR	Northwestern
DB	Frankie Williams	JR	Purdue
DB	Michael Caputo	JR	Wisconsin
DB	Darius Hillary	JR	Wisconsin
Second Team Special Teams (Coaches)
PK	Sam Ficken	SR	Penn State
P	Justin DuVernois	SR	Illinois

Honorable Mention: Illinois: V’Angelo Bentley, Mikey Dudek, Teddy Karras, Mason Monheim, Jihad Ward; Indiana: Antonio Allen, Dan Feeney, Collin Rahrig, Bobby Richardson, Shane Wynn; Iowa: Andrew Donnal, Jordan Lomax, John Lowdermilk, Drew Ott, Tevaun Smith; Maryland: Cole Farrand, Andre Monroe; Michigan: Brennan Beyer, Will Hagerup, Raymon Taylor; Michigan State: Ed Davis, Jeremy Langford, Josiah Price, Marcus Rush, Mike Sadler; Minnesota: Cameron Botticelli, Josh Campion, Theiren Cockran, Tommy Olson; Nebraska: Zaire Anderson, Jake Cotton, Sam Foltz, Nate Gerry, Alex Lewis, Josh Mitchell; Northwestern: Chi Chi Ariguzo, Justin Jackson, Dean Lowry, Nick Van Hoose, Brandon Vitabile, Dan Vitale; Ohio State: Darryl Baldwin, Cameron Johnston, Joshua Perry, Devin Smith, Evan Spencer; Penn State: Adrian Amos, Deion Barnes, DaeSean Hamilton, Jesse James, Jordan Lucas; Purdue: Landon Feichter, Paul Griggs; Rutgers: Leonte Carroo, Kaleb Johnson; Wisconsin: Vince Biegel, Rafael Gaglianone, Dallas Lewallen, Tyler Marz, Joe Schobert, Marcus Trotter, Dan Voltz.

Unanimous selections in ALL CAPS

Media All-Conference Selections

Position	Player	Class	Team
First Team Offense (Media)
QB	J.T. BARRETT	FR	Ohio State
RB	Tevin Coleman	JR	Indiana
RB	Melvin Gordon	JR	Wisconsin
WR	Tony Lippett	SR	Michigan State
WR	Leonte Carroo	JR	Rutgers
TE	Maxx Williams	SO	Minnesota
C	Jack Allen	JR	Michigan State
OG	Zac Epping	SR	Minnesota
OG	Kyle Costigan	SR	Wisconsin
OT	Brandon Scherff	SR	Iowa
OT	Rob Havenstein	SR	Wisconsin
First Team Defense (Media)
DL	Shilique Calhoun	JR	Michigan State
DL	Randy Gregory	JR	Nebraska
DL	JOEY BOSA	SO	Ohio State
DL	Anthony Zettel	SR	Penn State
LB	Jake Ryan	SR	Michigan
LB	Damien Wilson	SR	Minnesota
LB	Mike Hull	SR	Penn State
DB	William Likely	SO	Maryland
DB	Briean Boddy-Calhoun	JR	Minnesota
DB	Kurtis Drummond	SR	Michigan State
DB	Trae Waynes	JR	Michigan State
First Team Special Teams (Media)
PK	Brad Craddock	JR	Maryland
P	Peter Mortell	JR	Minnesota

Position	Player	Class	Team
Second Team Offense (Media)
QB	Connor Cook	JR	Michigan State
RB	David Cobb	SR	Minnesota
RB	Ameer Abdullah	SR	Nebraska
WR	Mikey Dudek	FR	Illinois
WR	DaeSean Hamilton	FR	Penn State
TE	Jeff Heuerman	SR	Ohio State
C	Dan Voltz	SO	Wisconsin
OG	Travis Jackson	SR	Michigan State
OG	Pat Elflein	SO	Ohio State
OT	Jack Conklin	SO	Michigan State
OT	Taylor Decker	JR	Ohio State
Second Team Defense (Media)
DL	Carl Davis	SR	Iowa
DL	Drew Ott	JR	Iowa
DL	Andre Monroe	SR	Maryland
DL	Michael Bennett	SR	Ohio State
LB	Joshua Perry	JR	Ohio State
LB	Vince Biegel	SO	Wisconsin
LB	Derek Landisch	SR	Wisconsin
DB	Nate Gerry	SO	Nebraska
DB	Nick Van Hoose	JR	Northwestern
DB	Doran Grant	SR	Ohio State
DB	Michael Caputo	JR	Wisconsin
Second Team Special Teams (Media)
PK	Sam Ficken	SR	Penn State
P	Justin DuVernois	SR	Illinois

Honorable Mention: Illinois: Taylor Barton, V’Angelo Bentley, Ted Karras, Mason Monheim; Indiana: Antonio Allen, Dan Feeney, Collin Rahrig, Bobby Richardson, Jason Spriggs, Shane Wynn; Iowa: Quinton Alston, Austin Blythe, Jake Duzey, John Lowdermilk, Desmond King, Louis Trinca-Pasat; Maryland: Sean Davis, Stefon Diggs, Cole Farrand, Darius Kilgo, Yannick Ngakoue; Michigan: Brennan Beyer, Blake Countess, Devin Funchess, Raymon Taylor; Michigan State: Ed Davis, Taiwan Jones, Jeremy Langford, Josiah Price, Marcus Rush, Mike Sadler; Minnesota: Cameron Botticelli, Josh Campion, Theiren Cockran, Eric Murray, Tommy Olson; Nebraska: Zaire Anderson, Kenny Bell, Maliek Collins, Corey Cooper, Jake Cotton, Alex Lewis, Josh Mitchell; Northwestern: Chi Chi Ariguzo, Ibraheim Campbell, Cameron Johnston, Brandon Vitabile, Dan Vitale; Ohio State: Darryl Baldwin, Vonn Bell, Ezekiel Elliott, Cameron Johnston, Devin Smith, Michael Thomas, Adolphus Washington; Penn State: Adrian Amos, Deion Barnes, Jesse James, Austin Johnson, Jordan Lucas, Angelo Mangiro, Trevor Williams; Purdue: Landon Feichter, Robert Kugler, Frankie Williams; Rutgers: Darius Hamilton, Kaleb Johnson, Kemoko Turay; Wisconsin: Sam Arneson, Rafael Gaglianone, Darius Hillary, Dallas Lewallen, Tyler Marz, Joe Schobert, Marcus Trotter

== All-Americans ==
There are many outlets that award All-America honors in football. The NCAA uses five official selectors to also determine Consensus and Unanimous All-America honors. The five teams used by the NCAA to compile the consensus team are from the Associated Press, the AFCA, the FWAA, The Sporting News and the Walter Camp Football Foundation. A point system is used to calculate the consensus honors. The point system consists of three points for first team, two points for second team and three points for third team. No honorable mention or fourth team or lower are used in the computation.

The teams are compiled by position and the player accumulating the most points at each position is named a Consensus All-American. If there is a tie at a position in football for first team then the players who are tied shall be named to the team. A player named first-team by all five of the NCAA-recognized selectors is recognized as a Unanimous All-American.

2014 First Team All-Americans

Player	School	Position	Selector
Melvin Gordon	Wisconsin	RB	CBS Sports, USA Today, Walter Camp, ESPN, Athlon Sports, SB Nation, AP, Scout, SI, AFCA, Sporting News, FWAA, Phil Steele
Tevin Coleman	Indiana	RB	CBS Sports, USA Today, Walter Camp, ESPN, Athlon Sports, SB Nation, AP, Scout, SI, AFCA, Sporting News, FWAA, Phil Steele
Maxx Williams	Minnesota	TE	Sporting News, FWAA, Phil Steele
Brandon Scherff	Iowa	OT	CBS Sports, USA Today, Walter Camp, Athlon Sports, SB Nation, AP, Scout, SI, AFCA, Sporting News, FWAA, Phil Steele
Kyle Costigan	Wisconsin	OG	ESPN
Rob Havenstein	Wisconsin	OT	AFCA
Jack Allen	Michigan State	C	USA Today
Joey Bosa	Ohio State	DE	CBS Sports, USA Today, Walter Camp, Athlon Sports, SB Nation, AP, Scout, AFCA, Sporting News, FWAA, Phil Steele
Michael Bennett	Ohio State	DT	CBS Sports, SB Nation
Kurtis Drummond	Michigan State	CB	FWAA, Phil Steele
Brad Craddock	Maryland	PK	Phil Steele

Joey Bosa, Tevin Coleman, Melvin Gordon and Brandon Scherff were declared Unanimous All-Americans for 2014 having been named to the First Teams by all five selectors recognized by the NCAA (Associated Press, American Football Coaches Association, Football Writers Association of America, Walter Camp, Sporting News)

== Academic All-Americans ==
Six Big Ten student-athletes were named to the Capital One Academic All-America first or second teams in football as announced by CoSIDA. The Big Ten has now led all Football Bowl Subdivision (FBS) conferences in Academic All-Americans for 10 straight seasons, with 78 honorees over that time span.

First Team: Mark Murphy, Indiana; Mike Sadler, Michigan State; Maxx Williams, Minnesota; Davie Milewski, Rutgers. Second Team: Mark Weisman, Iowa; Jacoby Boren, Ohio State.

To be eligible for the award, a player must be in at least his second year of athletic eligibility, be a first-team or key performer and carry a cumulative 3.30 grade point average (GPA).

== National Award Winners ==
- Tom Herman, Ohio State – Frank Broyles Award (top assistant coach)
- Melvin Gordon, Wisconsin – Doak Walker Award (top running back)
- Brad Craddock, Maryland – Lou Groza Award (top placekicker)
- Brandon Scherff, Iowa – Outland Trophy (top interior lineman)

== Attendance ==
Team	Stadium	Capacity	Game 1	Game 2	Game 3	Game 4	Game 5	Game 6	Game 7	Game 8	Total	Average	% of Capacity
Illinois	Memorial Stadium	60,670	36,234	38,561	41,019	45,046	44,437	50,373	35,172	—	290,842	41,549	68.5%
Indiana	Memorial Stadium	52,929	38,006	44,313	40,457	44,403	42,683	40,079	—	—	249,941	41,657	78.7%
Iowa	Kinnick Stadium	70,585	66,805	64,210	70,585	68,590	66,887	68,610	66,897	—	472,584	67,512	95.6%
Maryland	Byrd Stadium	51,802	45,080	48,154	51,802	48,373	51,802	36,673	—	—	281,884	46,981	90.7%
Michigan	Michigan Stadium	109,901	106,811	102,824	103,890	102,926	113,085	103,111	101,717	—	734,364	104,909	95.5%
Michigan State	Spartan Stadium	75,005	75,127	73,846	74,227	75,923	76,331	76,409	70,902	—	522,765	74,681	99.6%
Minnesota	TCF Bank Stadium	50,805	44,344	47,223	47,739	49,051	51,241	49,680	45,778	—	335,056	47,865	94.2%
Nebraska	Memorial Stadium	87,091	91,441	91,082	91,585	91,255	91,088	91,107	91,186	—	638,744	91,249	104.8%
Northwestern	Ryan Field	47,130	34,228	41,139	32,016	42,013	47,330	42,429	31,137	—	270,292	38,613	81.9%
Ohio State	Ohio Stadium	102,329	107,517	104,404	108,362	106,795	106,961	101,426	108,610	—	744,075	106,296	103.9%
Penn State	Beaver Stadium	106,572	97,354	99,155	102,910	107,895	103,969	100,173	99,902	—	711,358	101,623	95.4%
Purdue	Ross–Ade Stadium	56,400	37,031	36,410	31,434	36,603	40,217	35,068	30,117	—	246,880	35,269	62.5%
Rutgers	High Point Solutions Stadium	52,454	48,040	53,774	48,361	53,327	52,797	47,492	—	—	303,791	50,632	96.5%
Wisconsin	Camp Randall Stadium	80,321	77,125	79,849	78,111	80,341	80,336	80,539	80,341	—	556,642	79,520	99.0%
Total	–	–	–	–	–	–	–	–	–	–	6,358,858	66,311	–

== 2015 NFL draft ==
35 Big Ten athletes were selected in the 2015 NFL Draft.

Team	Round 1	Round 2	Round 3	Round 4	Round 5	Round 6	Round 7	Total
Illinois								
Indiana			1					1
Iowa	1		1	1				3
Maryland					1	1		2
Michigan		2		1				3
Michigan State	1			1	2			4
Minnesota		1		1	2			4
Nebraska		2			1			3
Northwestern				1			1	2
Ohio State		1	1	1		2		5
Penn State		1			2			3
Purdue					1			1
Rutgers			1		1			2
Wisconsin	1	1						2

*	= Compensatory Selections

Rnd.	Pick	Team	Player	Pos.	College	Notes
1	5	Washington Redskins	Brandon Scherff	T	Iowa	
1	11	Minnesota Vikings	Trae Waynes	CB	Michigan State	
1	15	San Diego Chargers	Melvin Gordon III	RB	Wisconsin	from San Francisco (Note: No. 15: San Francisco → San Diego (D). San Francisco traded this selection to San Diego in exchange for San Diego's 2015 first and fourth round selections (17th) & (117th), and their fifth round selection in 2016.)
2	34	Tampa Bay Buccaneers	Donovan Smith	T	Penn State	
2	37	New York Jets	Devin Smith	WR	Ohio State	
2	41	Carolina Panthers	Devin Funchess	WR	Michigan	from St. Louis (Note: No. 41: St. Louis → Carolina (D). St. Louis traded this selection to Carolina in exchange for Carolina's 2015 second, third and sixth round selections (57th), (89th) & (201st).)
2	54	Detroit Lions	Ameer Abdullah	RB	Nebraska	
2	55	Baltimore Ravens	Maxx Williams	TE	Minnesota	from Arizona (Note: No. 55: Arizona → Baltimore (D). Arizona traded this selection to Baltimore in exchange for Baltimore's 2015 second round selection and a fifth round selection (58th & 158th).)
2	57	St. Louis Rams	Rob Havenstein	T	Wisconsin	from Carolina (Note: No. 57: Carolina → St. Louis (D). see No. 41: Carolina → St. Louis.)
2	60	Dallas Cowboys	Randy Gregory	LB	Nebraska	
2	63	Seattle Seahawks	Frank Clark	DE	Michigan	
3	73	Atlanta Falcons	Tevin Coleman	RB	Indiana	
3	85	Cincinnati Bengals	Tyler Kroft	TE	Rutgers	
3	90	Baltimore Ravens	Carl Davis	DT	Iowa	
3	92	Denver Broncos	Jeff Heuerman	TE	Ohio State	
4	106	Chicago Bears	Jeremy Langford	RB	Michigan State	
4	115	Cleveland Browns	Ibraheim Campbell	S	Northwestern	from Buffalo (Note: No. 115: Buffalo → Cleveland (PD). see No. 19: Buffalo → Cleveland.)
4	119	St. Louis Rams	Andrew Donnal	T	Iowa	from Philadelphia (Note: No. 119: Philadelphia → St. Louis (PD). Philadelphia traded this selection, their second-round selection in 2016, and quarterback Nick Foles to St. Louis in exchange for St. Louis' fifth-round selection (145th) and quarterback Sam Bradford. The trade also includes a possible 2016 conditional selection going to Philadelphia based on Bradford's playing time in 2015. If Bradford takes less than 50 percent of the snaps, Philadelphia will receive St. Louis' fourth-round selection. If he does not play at all, Philadelphia will receive St. Louis' third-round selection.)
4	121	Pittsburgh Steelers	Doran Grant	CB	Ohio State	
4	127	Dallas Cowboys	Damien Wilson	LB	Minnesota	
4	129	Green Bay Packers	Jake Ryan	LB	Michigan	
5	138	Tennessee Titans	David Cobb	RB	Minnesota	
5	142	Chicago Bears	Adrian Amos	FS	Penn State	from New York Jets (Note: No. 142: New York Jets → Chicago (PD). The Jets traded this selection to Chicago in exchange for wide receiver Brandon Marshall and a seventh-round selection (224th).)
5	146	Minnesota Vikings	Stefon Diggs	WR	Maryland	from Atlanta
5	150	Miami Dolphins	Cedric Thompson	FS	Minnesota	
5	156	Miami Dolphins	Tony Lippett	WR	Michigan State	from Philadelphia (Note: No. 156: Philadelphia → Miami (D). see No. 47: Miami → Philadelphia.)
5	160	Pittsburgh Steelers	Jesse James	TE	Penn State	
5	162	Tampa Bay Buccaneers	Kenny Bell	WR	Nebraska	from Baltimore (Note: No. 162: Baltimore → Tampa Bay (PD). Baltimore traded this selection to Tampa Bay in exchange for offensive lineman Jeremy Zuttah.)
5	163	Dallas Cowboys	Ryan Russell	DE	Purdue	
5	168	Detroit Lions	Michael Burton	FB	Rutgers	from New England via Tampa Bay (Note: No. 168: multiple trades: No. 168: New England → Tampa Bay (PD). New England traded this selection to Tampa Bay in exchange for linebacker Jonathan Casillas and Tampa Bay's sixth-round selection.)
5*	175	Houston Texans	Keith Mumphery	WR	Michigan State	
6	180	Jacksonville Jaguars	Michael Bennett	DT	Ohio State	
6	187	Washington Redskins	Evan Spencer	WR	Ohio State	from New Orleans
6	203	Denver Broncos	Darius Kilgo	NT	Maryland	
7*	250	Denver Broncos	Trevor Siemian	QB	Northwestern	

In the explanations below, (PD) indicates trades completed prior to the start of the draft (i.e. Pre-Draft), while (D) denotes trades that took place during the 2015 draft.

Round one

Round two

Round four

Round five

NFL Draft Selections by NCAA Conference
SEC – 54
ACC – 47
Pac-12 – 39
Big Ten – 35
Big 12 – 25
American – 11
Mountain West – 10
C-USA – 6
Sun Belt – 3
Independents – 2
MAC – 0
Non-FBS Conferences – 24

== Head coaches ==
- Tim Beckman, Illinois
- Kevin Wilson, Indiana
- Kirk Ferentz, Iowa
- Randy Edsall, Maryland
- Brady Hoke, Michigan
- Mark Dantonio, Michigan State
- Jerry Kill, Minnesota
- Bo Pelini, Nebraska
- Pat Fitzgerald, Northwestern
- Urban Meyer, Ohio State
- James Franklin, Penn State
- Darrell Hazell, Purdue
- Kyle Flood, Rutgers
- Gary Andersen, Wisconsin
