= Mike Dudek =

American football player (born 1995)

Profile
- Position: Wide receiver

Personal information
- Born: August 21, 1995 (age 31); Naperville, Illinois, U.S.
- Listed height: 5 ft 11 in (1.80 m)
- Listed weight: 195 lb (88 kg)

Career information
- High school: Neuqua Valley (IL)
- College: Illinois (2014−2018)

Awards and highlights
- First Team Freshman All-American (2014); Second Team All-Big Ten (2014)

Mike Dudek (born August 21, 1995) is an American former football wide receiver known for his time with the Illinois Fighting Illini. As a true freshman, Dudek broke Illinois' school record for receiving yards by a freshman, previously set by Arrelious Benn in 2007.

== High school ==
During his senior season, Dudek recorded 2,361 yards of Total offense, averaging 196.8 yards per game, and caught 23 TDs. This earned Dudek the Upstate Eight Conference Player of the Year award in 2013 and 1st Team All-State honors from the News-Gazette, Chicago Tribune, and IHSFCA. Despite these honors, Dudek's only received two Football Championship Subdivision offers, from North Dakota State and Illinois State. Illinois was Dudek's only Football Bowl Subdivision scholarship offer and he was primarily recruited by Mike Bellamy.

College recruiting
Name	Hometown	School	Height	Weight	40^{‡}	Commit date
Mike Dudek; WR	Naperville, IL	Neuqua Valley (IL)	5 ft 11 in (1.80 m)	163 lb (74 kg)	4.61	Apr 3, 2013
Mike Dudek; WR	Recruit ratings: Scout: Rivals: 247Sports: ESPN: (76)					
Overall recruit ranking: Scout: 72 (WR) Rivals: N/A 247Sports: 145 (WR) ESPN: 119 (WR)
Note: In many cases, Scout, Rivals, 247Sports, On3, and ESPN may conflict in their listings of height and weight.; In these cases, the average was taken. ESPN grades are on a 100-point scale.; Sources: "Illinois Football Commitment List". Rivals.; "2014 Illinois Football Commits". Scout.; "Illinois Cowboys". ESPN.; "Scout.com Team Recruiting Rankings". Scout.; "2014 Team Ranking". Rivals.com.; "Illinois 2014 Football Commits". 247Sports.

== College career ==
Dudek enrolled early at Illinois and participated in spring 2014 practices, impressing coaches and drawing early comparisons to Wes Welker. After Illinois' week 2 win over Western Kentucky in which Dudek had four receptions for 55 yards and a touchdown, he was named Big Ten Freshman of the Week. Later in the season Dudek was named to the Biletnikoff Award watch list. The Biletnikoff Award is awarded annually to the most outstanding receiver in American college football. In the October 4th game at home against Purdue, Dudek became the fourth player in school history to catch at least 200 yards in a game, joining Steve Hull, A. J. Jenkins, and College Football Hall of Fame Inductee David Williams. At the end of the 2014 season, Dudek led all Big Ten Conference freshmen in receptions and receiving yards. In 2015 spring workouts, Dudek tore his ACL and was medically redshirted, ending his season.

=== Statistics ===
Through the end of the 2017 regular season, Dudek's statistics are as follows:

Illinois Fighting Illini
Season	Receiving							Rushing			
Season	Games	Rec	Yards	Yds/Rec	Long	Yds/G	TD	Att	Yards	Avg	TD
2014	12	69	965	14.0	56	80.4	6	5	23	4.6	0
2015	Medical redshirt										
2016	Did not play due to injury (Torn ACL)										
2017	7	24	262	10.9	31	37.4	1	0	0	0	0

== Personal life ==
Due to his physical stature as a wide receiver, Dudek oftentimes draws comparisons to NFL Pro Bowl wideout Wes Welker. Dudek has also been timed running as fast as NFL Pro Bowl receiver Brandon Marshall at 22 miles per hour (35 km/h). Dudek has an older brother, Danny, who played college football for Dayton.
