= 2014 Northwestern Wildcats football team =

American college football season

2014 Northwestern Wildcats football
- Conference: Big Ten Conference
- West Division
- Record: 5–7 (3–5 Big Ten)
- Head coach: Pat Fitzgerald (9th season)
- Offensive coordinator: Mick McCall (7th season)
- Offensive scheme: Spread
- Defensive coordinator: Mike Hankwitz (7th season)
- Base defense: Multiple 4–3
- Captains: Brandon Vitabile; Ibraheim Campbell; Collin Ellis; Paul Jorgensen; Trevor Siemian
- Home stadium: Ryan Field

2014 Big Ten Conference football standings
| | Conf. | | | Overall |
| Team | W | | L | W | | L |
|---|---|---|---|---|---|---|
East Division
| No. 1 Ohio State x$#^ | 8 | – | 0 | 14 | – | 1 |
| No. T–5 Michigan State | 7 | – | 1 | 11 | – | 2 |
| Maryland | 4 | – | 4 | 7 | – | 6 |
| Rutgers | 3 | – | 5 | 8 | – | 5 |
| Michigan | 3 | – | 5 | 5 | – | 7 |
| Penn State | 2 | – | 6 | 7 | – | 6 |
| Indiana | 1 | – | 7 | 4 | – | 8 |
West Division
| No. 13 Wisconsin x | 7 | – | 1 | 11 | – | 3 |
| Minnesota | 5 | – | 3 | 8 | – | 5 |
| Nebraska | 5 | – | 3 | 9 | – | 4 |
| Iowa | 4 | – | 4 | 7 | – | 6 |
| Illinois | 3 | – | 5 | 6 | – | 7 |
| Northwestern | 3 | – | 5 | 5 | – | 7 |
| Purdue | 1 | – | 7 | 3 | – | 9 |
Championship: Ohio State 59, Wisconsin 0
# – College Football Playoff champion; ^ – College Football Playoff participant; $ – Conference champion; x – Division champion/co-champions; Rankings from AP Poll

The 2014 Northwestern Wildcats football team represented Northwestern University during the 2014 NCAA Division I FBS football season. Pat Fitzgerald, who was in his ninth season at Northwestern, as the team's head coach. The Wildcats home games were played at Ryan Field in Evanston, Illinois. They were members of the new West Division of the Big Ten Conference. They finished the season 5–7, 3–5 in Big Ten play to finish in a tie for fifth place in the West Division.

== Personnel ==
=== Coaching staff ===
| Name | Position | Seasons at Northwestern | Alma mater |
|---|---|---|---|
| Pat Fitzgerald | Head coach | 9 | Northwestern (1996) |
| Mick McCall | Offensive coordinator/quarterbacks | 7 | Southern Colorado (1978) |
| Mike Hankwitz | Defensive coordinator | 7 | Michigan (1970) |
| Randy Bates | Linebackers | 8 | Ohio State (1983) |
| Jerry Brown | Defensive Backs/Assistant head coach | 21 | Northwestern (1972) |
| Adam Cushing | Offensive line | 4 | Chicago (2002) |
| Bob Heffner | Superbacks | 5 | Temple (1979) |
| Marty Long | Defensive line | 5 | The Citadel (1986) |
| Matt MacPherson | Running backs/recruiting coordinator | 8 | DePauw (1993) |
| Dennis Springer | Wide receivers | 3 | Butler (1993) |

== Schedule ==
| Date | Time | Opponent | Site | TV | Result | Attendance |
|---|---|---|---|---|---|---|
| August 30 | 2:30 pm | California* | Ryan Field; Evanston, IL | ABC/ESPN2 | L 24–31 | 34,228 |
| September 6 | 2:30 pm | Northern Illinois* | Ryan Field; Evanston, IL | BTN | L 15–23 | 41,139 |
| September 20 | 11:00 am | Western Illinois* | Ryan Field; Evanston, IL | ESPNews | W 24–7 | 32,016 |
| September 27 | 11:00 am | at Penn State | Beaver Stadium; University Park, PA | BTN | W 29–6 | 102,910 |
| October 4 | 3:30 pm | No. 17 Wisconsin | Ryan Field; Evanston, IL | ESPN2 | W 20–14 | 42,013 |
| October 11 | 11:00 am | at Minnesota | TCF Bank Stadium; Minneapolis, MN | BTN | L 17–24 | 49,051 |
| October 18 | 6:30 pm | No. 19 Nebraska^{†} | Ryan Field; Evanston, IL | BTN | L 17–38 | 47,330 |
| November 1 | 11:00 am | at Iowa | Kinnick Stadium; Iowa City, IA | BTN | L 7–48 | 66,887 |
| November 8 | 2:30 pm | Michigan | Ryan Field; Evanston, IL (rivalry) | ESPN2 | L 9–10 | 42,429 |
| November 15 | 2:30 pm | at No. 18 Notre Dame* | Notre Dame Stadium; Notre Dame, IN (rivalry) | NBC | W 43–40 ^{OT} | 80,795 |
| November 22 | 11:00 am | at Purdue | Ross–Ade Stadium; West Lafayette, IN | ESPNU | W 38–14 | 30,117 |
| November 29 | 11:00 am | Illinois | Ryan Field; Evanston, IL (Battle for the Land of Lincoln Trophy) | ESPNU | L 33–47 | 31,137 |
*Non-conference game; ^{†}Homecoming; Rankings from AP Poll released prior to the game; All times are in Central time

Schedule source:

== Game summaries ==
=== California ===
In a rematch of the 2013 season opener, Cal got off to a fast start, scoring on their first 3 drives to jump out to a 17–0 lead. Northwestern would get on the board with a long touchdown throw from Trevor Siemian to Cameron Dickerson, but Cal responded with a 76 yard touchdown catch by Trevor Davis. Cal would score again at the start of the 3rd to go up 31–7, but Northwestern would fight their way back into the game thanks to questionable play calling and turnovers by Cal. With the Wildcats trailing 31–24 and driving with the ball inside of the Bears' 20 yard-line, Trevor Siemian was intercepted by linebacker Jalen Jefferson, sealing the win for the Golden Bears, and getting revenge on the Wildcats, who beat them 44–30 in Berkley in the first game of the 2013 season. Trevor Siemian finished with 229 yards passing, with 1 touchdown and 2 interceptions, and he also caught a touchdown pass. Jared Goff threw for over 300 yards and 3 touchdowns for Cal, while throwing one interception.

| | 1 | 2 | 3 | 4 | Total |
|---|---|---|---|---|---|
| Golden Bears | 14 | 10 | 7 | 0 | 31 |
| Wildcats | 0 | 7 | 14 | 3 | 24 |

=== Northern Illinois ===
The week 2 matchup between Northern Illinois and Northwestern was a major defensive struggle, with both teams failing to score in the first half. The best chance for Northwestern came when Miles Shuler dropped a would-be touchdown throw from Trevor Siemian midway through the second quarter. Northern Illinois had a good scoring chance before halftime but Tyler Wedel missed a 22 yard field goal. Wedel got the scoring started with a 32 yard field goal on the Huskies opening drive of the second half. Later in the quarter, Northwestern would take a 7–3 lead on a 19 yard touchdown catch by Kyle Prater. Northern Illinois would respond with Drew Hare finding Da'Ron Brown for an 18 yard touchdown to give the Huskies a 10–7 lead going into the 4th. The Huskies would strike again when Hare found Brown again, this time from 59 yards to give NIU a 16–7 lead with 7 minutes left. Northern Illinois scored again to make it 23–7, and the Wildcats would make things interesting when Zack Oliver, replacing an injured Trevor Siemian, would hook up with Pierre Youngblood-Ary for a 54 yard score. The Wildcats converted the two-point conversion to make it a one score game at 23–15, however the Huskies would recover Northwestern's onside kick to win the game. Northwestern would enter their bye week 0–2.

| | 1 | 2 | 3 | 4 | Total |
|---|---|---|---|---|---|
| Huskies | 0 | 0 | 10 | 13 | 23 |
| Wildcats | 0 | 0 | 7 | 8 | 15 |

=== Western Illinois ===
Coming off a bye week, Northwestern needed a win to avoid an 0–3 start heading into conference play. They got on the board quickly as freshman running back Solomon Vault ran it in from 1 yard out to give the 'Cats a 7–0 lead. Western Illinois would respond just as quickly as Joey Borsellino caught a 4 yard touchdown pass from Trenton Norvell, tying the game at 7–7. After Ifeadi Odenigbo sacked Norvell and recovered a fumble, Vault would score again in the second quarter, this time from 14 yards out and the Wildcats had a 14–7 lead going into halftime. From there the Wildcats were able to control the game in the second half, en route to a 24–7 victory. Trevor Siemian didn't do a lot through the air, going just 15/25 for 117 yards with no touchdowns or interceptions, but the Wildcats were able to run the ball very effectively, combining for 166 yards and 3 touchdowns. The Northwestern defense also had a terrific today, getting 4 sacks and forcing 4 Western Illinois turnovers. It was just Northwestern's second win in their last 11 games, dating back to last season. The Wildcats headed into Big Ten conference play 1–2.

| | 1 | 2 | 3 | 4 | Total |
|---|---|---|---|---|---|
| Leathernecks | 7 | 0 | 0 | 0 | 7 |
| Wildcats | 7 | 7 | 7 | 3 | 24 |

=== Penn State ===
Considered a double-digit underdog going into the game, Northwestern shocked many and got off to a quick start against Penn State. Northwestern drove the ball down the field on their opening drive but Jack Mitchell missed a 44 yard field goal. However, on their next two drives, Northwestern would get into the end zone twice, with Trevor Siemian running it in from 1 yard out both times. Sam Ficken would kick two field goals to cut the Northwestern lead to 14–6 after three quarters. But the Northwestern defense would come up big yet again, with true freshman linebacker Anthony Walker intercepting Christian Hackenberg on the first play of the 4th quarter and returning it 45 yards for a Wildcat touchdown. On the very next play, Hackenberg was sacked, fumbled, and it was recovered by the Wildcats, leading to a field goal and all but ending the game. Northwestern would add another Siemian 1 yard touchdown run to put NU up 29–6 The Northwestern defense was unbelievable throughout the game, holding Penn State to just 60 yards rushing on 25 carries, while also registering 4 sacks, an interception, a fumble recovery, and a blocked field goal, leading to a shocking, dominating win over a team many people thought had an outside chance at the Big Ten Championship. It was the first time Northwestern had beaten Penn State since 2004.

| | 1 | 2 | 3 | 4 | Total |
|---|---|---|---|---|---|
| Wildcats | 14 | 0 | 0 | 15 | 29 |
| Nittany Lions | 0 | 3 | 3 | 0 | 6 |

=== Wisconsin ===
Coming off their upset win at Penn State, the Wildcats returned home to face the 17th ranked Wisconsin Badgers. Again the Wildcats were the better team coming out of the gate, as Jack Mitchell booted a 22 yard field-goal to give the Cats a 3–0 lead. On the ensuing drive, Tanner McEvoy's pass was intercepted in the end zone by Godwin Igwebuike. The teams would trade off punts before Trevor Siemian led a 15-play, 80 yard drive that took up nearly 7 minutes of clock and was capped off by a 5-yard touchdown strike from Siemian to Dan Vitale, giving Northwestern a 10–0 lead. On the first drive of the second half, Joel Stave entered the game and The Badgers would finally get on the board thanks to a Melvin Gordon 3-yard touchdown run. On the Badgers next drive, Stave's pass would be intercepted, and the Wildcats would capitalize with Miles Shuler taking an end around 16 yards for a touchdown, putting the Wildcats up 17–7. Wisconsin would score a late touchdown to cut the lead to 20–14, and the Badgers would get one last chance, but Joel Stave's pass would be intercepted by Igwebuike with 18 seconds left, sealing the win for the Wildcats. Tanner McEvoy and Joel Stave combined to throw just 129 yards and 4 interceptions, including two in the end zone, and three total by redshirt freshman Godwin Igwebuike. The Badgers lost despite a career-high 259 yards rushing by Melvin Gordon. Justin Jackson did just as well for Northwestern, rushing for 162 yards on 30 carries. It was the second-consecutive upset win for Northwestern and their fourth consecutive victory over Wisconsin at Ryan Field.

| | 1 | 2 | 3 | 4 | Total |
|---|---|---|---|---|---|
| Badgers | 0 | 0 | 7 | 7 | 14 |
| Wildcats | 3 | 7 | 7 | 3 | 20 |

=== Minnesota ===
Northwestern entered TCF Bank Stadium attempting to go 3–0 to start their conference season. Minnesota got the scoring started with a beautiful 11 play, 63 yard drive that was capped off by a Mitch Leidner 1 yard touchdown run. The Wildcats would answer right back with an equally impressive 17 play 83 yard drive that ended with Trevor Siemian completing an 11 yard touchdown pass to Justin Jackson. Minnesota would answer again with a 6 play 75 yard drive, capped off by yet another Leidner 1 yard run to put the Gophers back up 14–7. Northwestern got a field goal before half and Minnesota led 14–10 at halftime. In the second half, the defenses took over as the third quarter went scoreless. After Minnesota kicked a field goal, Trevor Siemian scored a 2 yard touchdown run to tie the game at 17–17 with 7:32 left, capping off a 13 play 97 yard drive. On the ensuing kickoff, Jalen Myrick returned the kickoff 100 yards to give Minnesota the lead right back at 24–17. Northwestern would have a couple more chances to tie the game, but wide receiver Kyle Prater dropped a pass on a 4th & 3 which would have given Northwestern a first down with just under 2 minutes left. Northwestern had one last crack at the tie, but Siemian's hail mary pass was intercepted by Minnesota, securing the win for the Gophers. Justin Jackson had his second consecutive 100 yard rushing game for Northwestern, as he ran for 106 yards on 23 carries, and also had 4 catches for 50 yards and a receiving touchdown. With the loss, the 'Cats' three-game winning streak was snapped and they dropped to 3–3, and 2–1 in conference play. Minnesota improved to 5–1 overall, and 2–0 in Big Ten play.

| | 1 | 2 | 3 | 4 | Total |
|---|---|---|---|---|---|
| Wildcats | 0 | 10 | 0 | 7 | 17 |
| Golden Gophers | 7 | 7 | 0 | 10 | 24 |

=== Nebraska ===
Coming off a tough road loss at Minnesota the week before, Northwestern looked to rebound in a Saturday night game at Ryan Field against Nebraska. In an up and down first half, Northwestern running back Justin Jackson shined, rushing for 105 yards and a pair of scores in the first half. Jackson got the scoring started with a 1 yard run with 5:58 left in the first. Ameer Abdullah would answer for the Huskers with a 1 yard run of his own. The 'Cats responded with an 88 yard drive, capped off by another Jackson rushing touchdown to take a 14–7 lead. Nebraska would answer right back to tie the score at 14–14. Northwestern was able to get a field goal before halftime, taking a 17–14 lead into the break. However, Nebraska would go on to dominate the second half as Northwestern managed just 30 yards of total offense in the second half. Nebraska took a 21–17 lead on an Ameer Abdullah touchdown run. In the fourth quarter, the Nebraska run game got going. The Huskers went up 28–17 on another Ameer Abdullah 1 yard touchdown run, which immediately followed his 50-yard run on 3rd & 1. From there, the Huskers defense stood tall and helped to put the game out of reach. The Huskers would go on to win 38–17. After a mediocre first half, Abdullah finished the game with 146 rushing yards and 4 touchdowns for the Huskers. Justin Jackson continued to prove himself as a great young running back as he finished with 128 yards and 2 touchdowns for the Wildcats, his third consecutive 100 yard game. The Wildcats dropped their second game in a row, dropping them to 3–4, 2–2 before a bye week. It was Northwestern's third consecutive loss against the Huskers after beating them in 2011.

| | 1 | 2 | 3 | 4 | Total |
|---|---|---|---|---|---|
| Cornhuskers | 0 | 14 | 7 | 17 | 38 |
| Wildcats | 7 | 10 | 0 | 0 | 17 |

=== Iowa ===
Coming off a bye week, Northwestern traveled to Kinnick Stadium to take on the Iowa Hawkeyes. The Hawkeyes took advantage of great field position and scored in 4 plays to take a 7–0 lead. After consecutive three and outs by Northwestern, Iowa would go up 17–0, thanks to Mark Weisman's second touchdown of the day. After another short drive, Chris Gradone had his punt blocked and returned for a touchdown, giving the Hawkeyes a 24–0 lead with 3 minutes left in the first quarter. From there the Hawkeyes would continue to dominate the Wildcats in every phase of the game. The Hawkeyes would get another touchdown from Mark Weisman, his third of the first half, and Jake Rudock threw a touchdown to Tevaun Smith, giving Iowa a 38–7 halftime advantage. Northwestern's only points of the game came as a result of a short field. This game was thoroughly dominated by the Hawkeyes as they outgained the Wildcats 483–180. Trevor Siemian had a rough game, throwing for just 68 yards on 8/18 passing. The only bright spot for Northwestern was Justin Jackson, who ran for 96 yards on 24 carries and had the lone score for Northwestern. With the loss, Northwestern dropped to 3–5, 2–3 in the Big Ten and dropped their third consecutive game. Jake Rudock threw for 239 yards and 1 touchdown for the Hawkeyes. Mark Weisman ran for 94 yards and 3 scores. It was the third consecutive loss for the Wildcats at Kinnick Stadium.

| | 1 | 2 | 3 | 4 | Total |
|---|---|---|---|---|---|
| Wildcats | 0 | 7 | 0 | 0 | 7 |
| Hawkeyes | 24 | 14 | 0 | 10 | 48 |

=== Michigan ===
| | 1 | 2 | 3 | 4 | Total |
|---|---|---|---|---|---|
| Wolverines | 0 | 0 | 7 | 3 | 10 |
| Wildcats | 0 | 0 | 0 | 9 | 9 |

=== Notre Dame ===
| | 1 | 2 | 3 | 4 | OT | Total |
|---|---|---|---|---|---|---|
| Wildcats | 9 | 14 | 3 | 14 | 3 | 43 |
| Fighting Irish | 20 | 7 | 7 | 6 | 0 | 40 |

=== Purdue ===
| | 1 | 2 | 3 | 4 | Total |
|---|---|---|---|---|---|
| Wildcats | 14 | 10 | 0 | 14 | 38 |
| Boilermakers | 0 | 7 | 0 | 7 | 14 |

=== Illinois ===
| | 1 | 2 | 3 | 4 | Total |
|---|---|---|---|---|---|
| Fighting Illini | 13 | 13 | 7 | 14 | 47 |
| Wildcats | 0 | 7 | 10 | 16 | 33 |
