= 2014 Rutgers Scarlet Knights football team =

American college football season

2014 Rutgers Scarlet Knights football

Lambert-Meadowlands champion Quick Lane Bowl champion

Quick Lane Bowl, W 40–21 vs. North Carolina
- Conference: Big Ten Conference
- East Division
- Record: 8–5 (3–5 Big Ten)
- Head coach: Kyle Flood (3rd season)
- Offensive coordinator: Ralph Friedgen (1st season)
- Offensive scheme: Pro-style
- Defensive coordinator: Joe Rossi (1st season)
- Base defense: 4–3
- Home stadium: High Point Solutions Stadium

2014 Big Ten Conference football standings
	Conf.			Overall
Team	W		L	W		L
East Division
No. 1 Ohio State x$#^	8	–	0	14	–	1
No. T–5 Michigan State	7	–	1	11	–	2
Maryland	4	–	4	7	–	6
Rutgers	3	–	5	8	–	5
Michigan	3	–	5	5	–	7
Penn State	2	–	6	7	–	6
Indiana	1	–	7	4	–	8
West Division
No. 13 Wisconsin x	7	–	1	11	–	3
Minnesota	5	–	3	8	–	5
Nebraska	5	–	3	9	–	4
Iowa	4	–	4	7	–	6
Illinois	3	–	5	6	–	7
Northwestern	3	–	5	5	–	7
Purdue	1	–	7	3	–	9
Championship: Ohio State 59, Wisconsin 0
# – College Football Playoff champion; ^ – College Football Playoff participant; $ – Conference champion; x – Division champion/co-champions; Rankings from AP Poll

The 2014 Rutgers Scarlet Knights football team represented Rutgers University–New Brunswick in the 2014 NCAA Division I FBS football season. The Scarlet Knights played their home games at High Point Solutions Stadium in Piscataway, New Jersey in their inaugural year as a member of the Big Ten Conference, having played the previous year in the American Athletic Conference. They were led by third year head coach Kyle Flood. They finished the season 8–5, 3–5 in Big Ten play to finish in a tie for fourth place in the East Division. They were invited to the Quick Lane Bowl where they defeated North Carolina.

== Coaching staff ==
Name	Position	Seasons at Rutgers	Alma mater
Kyle Flood	Head coach	9	Iona College (1992)
Norries Wilson	Associate Head Coach/Running Backs	3	Minnesota (1989)
Ralph Friedgen	Offensive Coordinator	0	Maryland
Joe Rossi	Defensive Coordinator	3	Allegheny College (2000)
Ben McDaniels	Wide Receivers	0	Kent State (2003)
Anthony Campanile	Tight Ends	3	Rutgers (2004)
Mitch Browning	Offensive Line	0	Capital University (1979)
Jim Panagos	Defensive Line	3	Maryland (1992)
Darrell Wilson	Defensive Backs	2	Connecticut (1981)
Charlie Noonan	Defensive Line Assistant	1	Rutgers (2010)
Sam Williams	Offensive Line Assistant	1	Shepherd (2008)
Jeremy Cole	Strength and Conditioning/Assistant AD	8	University of Findlay (2005)

== Schedule ==
Date	Time	Opponent	Site	TV	Result	Attendance
August 28	10:00 pm	vs. Washington State*	CenturyLink Field; Seattle, WA	FS1	W 41–38	30,927
September 6	12:00 pm	Howard*	High Point Solutions Stadium; Piscataway, NJ	BTN	W 38–25	48,040
September 13	8:00 pm	Penn State	High Point Solutions Stadium; Piscataway, NJ	BTN	L 10–13	53,774
September 20	3:30 pm	at Navy*	Navy–Marine Corps Memorial Stadium; Annapolis, MD	CBSSN	W 31–24	33,655
September 27	12:00 pm	Tulane*	High Point Solutions Stadium; Piscataway, NJ	ESPNews	W 31–6	48,361
October 4	7:00 pm	Michigan	High Point Solutions Stadium; Piscataway, NJ	BTN	W 26–24	53,327
October 18	3:30 pm	at No. 13 Ohio State	Ohio Stadium; Columbus, OH	ABC/ESPN2	L 17–56	106,795
October 25	12:00 pm	at No. 16 Nebraska	Memorial Stadium; Lincoln, NE	ESPN2	L 24–42	91,088
November 1	12:00 pm	Wisconsin^{†}	High Point Solutions Stadium; Piscataway, NJ	ESPN	L 0–37	52,797
November 15	3:30 pm	Indiana	High Point Solutions Stadium; Piscataway, NJ	BTN	W 45–23	47,492
November 22	12:00 pm	at No. 10 Michigan State	Spartan Stadium; East Lansing, MI	BTN	L 3–45	70,902
November 29	3:30 pm	at Maryland	Byrd Stadium; College Park, MD	ESPNU	W 41–38	36,673
December 26	4:30 pm	vs. North Carolina*	Ford Field; Detroit, MI (Quick Lane Bowl)	ESPN	W 40–21	23,876
*Non-conference game; ^{†}Homecoming; Rankings from Coaches' Poll released prior to the game; All times are in Eastern time

== Game summaries ==
=== Washington State ===
	1	2	3	4	Total
Scarlet Knights	7	14	3	17	41
Cougars	3	14	14	7	38

Michael Batlan is the game referee.

=== Howard ===
	1	2	3	4	Total
Bison	7	0	6	12	25
Scarlet Knights	10	21	7	0	38

=== Penn State ===
	1	2	3	4	Total
Nittany Lions	0	0	3	10	13
Scarlet Knights	0	10	0	0	10

=== Navy ===
	1	2	3	4	Total
Scarlet Knights	7	17	7	0	31
Midshipmen	7	7	3	7	24

=== Tulane ===
	1	2	3	4	Total
Green Wave	0	6	0	0	6
Scarlet Knights	14	7	3	7	31

=== Michigan ===
	1	2	3	4	Total
Wolverines	3	14	0	7	24
Scarlet Knights	6	13	0	7	26

=== Ohio State ===
	1	2	3	4	Total
Scarlet Knights	7	0	3	7	17
Buckeyes	14	21	21	0	56

=== Nebraska ===
	1	2	3	4	Total
Scarlet Knights	7	0	10	7	24
Cornhuskers	7	14	14	7	42

=== Wisconsin ===
	1	2	3	4	Total
Badgers	7	13	10	7	37
Scarlet Knights	0	0	0	0	0

=== Indiana ===
	1	2	3	4	Total
Hoosiers	3	10	3	7	23
Scarlet Knights	3	7	21	14	45

=== Michigan State ===
	1	2	3	4	Total
Scarlet Knights	0	0	3	0	3
Spartans	14	21	0	10	45

=== Maryland ===
	1	2	3	4	Total
Scarlet Knights	3	14	14	10	41
Terrapins	7	28	3	0	38

Rutgers had the biggest comeback in school history, being down 35-10 towards the end of the first half.

=== North Carolina–Quick Lane Bowl ===
	1	2	3	4	Total
Scarlet Knights	7	16	7	10	40
Tar Heels	0	0	7	14	21
