= 2014 Indiana Hoosiers football team =

American college football season

2014 Indiana Hoosiers football
- Conference: Big Ten Conference
- East Division
- Record: 4–8 (1–7 Big Ten)
- Head coach: Kevin Wilson (4th season)
- Offensive coordinator: Kevin Johns (4th season)
- Offensive scheme: Multiple
- Defensive coordinator: Brian Knorr (1st season)
- Base defense: Multiple
- MVP: Tevin Coleman
- Captains: Tevin Coleman; Collin Rahrig; Bobby Richardson; Shane Wynn
- Home stadium: Memorial Stadium

2014 Big Ten Conference football standings
| | Conf. | | | Overall |
| Team | W | | L | W | | L |
|---|---|---|---|---|---|---|
East Division
| No. 1 Ohio State x$#^ | 8 | – | 0 | 14 | – | 1 |
| No. T–5 Michigan State | 7 | – | 1 | 11 | – | 2 |
| Maryland | 4 | – | 4 | 7 | – | 6 |
| Rutgers | 3 | – | 5 | 8 | – | 5 |
| Michigan | 3 | – | 5 | 5 | – | 7 |
| Penn State | 2 | – | 6 | 7 | – | 6 |
| Indiana | 1 | – | 7 | 4 | – | 8 |
West Division
| No. 13 Wisconsin x | 7 | – | 1 | 11 | – | 3 |
| Minnesota | 5 | – | 3 | 8 | – | 5 |
| Nebraska | 5 | – | 3 | 9 | – | 4 |
| Iowa | 4 | – | 4 | 7 | – | 6 |
| Illinois | 3 | – | 5 | 6 | – | 7 |
| Northwestern | 3 | – | 5 | 5 | – | 7 |
| Purdue | 1 | – | 7 | 3 | – | 9 |
Championship: Ohio State 59, Wisconsin 0
# – College Football Playoff champion; ^ – College Football Playoff participant; $ – Conference champion; x – Division champion/co-champions; Rankings from AP Poll

The 2014 Indiana Hoosiers football team represented Indiana University during the 2014 NCAA Division I FBS football season. The Hoosiers played in the East division, a new division of the Big Ten Conference, and played their home games at Memorial Stadium in Bloomington, Indiana. The team was led by head coach Kevin Wilson, which was his fourth season. They finished the season 4–8, 1–7 in Big Ten play to finish in last place in the East Division.

== Preseason ==
=== Recruits ===
College recruiting information (2014)
| Name | Hometown | School | Height | Weight | 40^{‡} | Commit date |
|---|---|---|---|---|---|---|
| Delroy Baker; OL | Saint Petersburg, Florida | Admiral Farragut | 6 ft 6 in (1.98 m) | 290 lb (130 kg) | 5.7 | Jun 21, 2013 |
| Delroy Baker; OL | Recruit ratings: Scout: Rivals: 247Sports: ESPN: | | | | | |
| Michael Barwick; DT | Cincinnati, Ohio | Summit Country Day | 6 ft 0 in (1.83 m) | 291 lb (132 kg) | – | Jun 2, 2013 |
| Michael Barwick; DT | Recruit ratings: Scout: Rivals: 247Sports: ESPN: | | | | | |
| Dominique Booth; WR | Indianapolis, Indiana | Pike | 6 ft 0 in (1.83 m) | 200 lb (91 kg) | – | Jan 7, 2014 |
| Dominique Booth; WR | Recruit ratings: Scout: Rivals: 247Sports: ESPN: | | | | | |
| Danny Cameron; QB | Baton Rouge, Louisiana | Catholic | 6 ft 2 in (1.88 m) | 202 lb (92 kg) | Jul 2, 2014 | |
| Danny Cameron; QB | Recruit ratings: No ratings found | | | | | |
| Nick Carovillano; DE | Cincinnati, Ohio | St. Xavier | 6 ft 4 in (1.93 m) | 245 lb (111 kg) | 4.8 | Jul 19, 2013 |
| Nick Carovillano; DE | Recruit ratings: Scout: Rivals: 247Sports: ESPN: | | | | | |
| Donovan Clark; DB | Fort Wayne, Indiana | South Side | 5 ft 10 in (1.78 m) | 175 lb (79 kg) | – | Jul 2, 2013 |
| Donovan Clark; DB | Recruit ratings: Scout: Rivals: 247Sports: ESPN: | | | | | |
| Simmie Cobbs; ATH | Oak Park, Illinois | Oak Park River Forest | 6 ft 4 in (1.93 m) | 207 lb (94 kg) | – | Feb 2, 2014 |
| Simmie Cobbs; ATH | Recruit ratings: Scout: Rivals: 247Sports: ESPN: | | | | | |
| Jermane Conyers; DE | Rossville, Georgia | Ridgeland | 6 ft 3 in (1.91 m) | 290 lb (130 kg) | – | Jul 19, 2013 |
| Jermane Conyers; DE | Recruit ratings: Scout: Rivals: 247Sports: ESPN: | | | | | |
| Chris Covington; ATH | Chicago, Illinois | Al Raby | 6 ft 2 in (1.88 m) | 215 lb (98 kg) | – | Feb 5, 2014 |
| Chris Covington; ATH | Recruit ratings: Scout: Rivals: 247Sports: (NR) | | | | | |
| Will Dawkins; ATH | Vero Beach, Florida | Vero Beach | 5 ft 11 in (1.80 m) | 195 lb (88 kg) | – | Feb 2, 2014 |
| Will Dawkins; ATH | Recruit ratings: Scout: Rivals: 247Sports: ESPN: | | | | | |
| Alexander Diamont; QB | Los Angeles, California | Venice | 6 ft 1 in (1.85 m) | 175 lb (79 kg) | – | Jun 12, 2013 |
| Alexander Diamont; QB | Recruit ratings: Scout: Rivals: 247Sports: ESPN: | | | | | |
| Tony Fields; DB | Tallahassee, Florida | Godby | 5 ft 10 in (1.78 m) | 207 lb (94 kg) | – | Jan 22, 2014 |
| Tony Fields; DB | Recruit ratings: Scout: Rivals: 247Sports: ESPN: | | | | | |
| Jordan Fuchs; TE | New Berlin, New York | Milford Academy | 6 ft 6 in (1.98 m) | 230 lb (100 kg) | – | Dec 15, 2013 |
| Jordan Fuchs; TE | Recruit ratings: Scout: Rivals: 247Sports: ESPN: | | | | | |
| Tim Gardner; OL | New Berlin, New York | Milford Academy | 6 ft 5 in (1.96 m) | 320 lb (150 kg) | – | Dec 19, 2013 |
| Tim Gardner; OL | Recruit ratings: Scout: Rivals: 247Sports: ESPN: | | | | | |
| Greg Gooch; LB | Longwood, Florida | Lyman | 6 ft 2 in (1.88 m) | 235 lb (107 kg) | 4.7 | Feb 3, 2014 |
| Greg Gooch; LB | Recruit ratings: Scout: Rivals: 247Sports: ESPN: | | | | | |
| J-Shun Harris; WR | Fishers, Indiana | Fishers | 5 ft 8 in (1.73 m) | 165 lb (75 kg) | 4.4 | Jul 10, 2012 |
| J-Shun Harris; WR | Recruit ratings: Scout: Rivals: 247Sports: ESPN: | | | | | |
| DeAndre Herron; OL | Council Bluffs, Iowa | Iowa Western CC | 6 ft 5 in (1.96 m) | 330 lb (150 kg) | – | Jun 8, 2013 |
| DeAndre Herron; OL | Recruit ratings: Scout: Rivals: 247Sports: ESPN: | | | | | |
| Coray Keel; WR | Snellville, Georgia | South Gwinnett | 6 ft 2 in (1.88 m) | 184 lb (83 kg) | 4.5 | Sep 30, 2013 |
| Coray Keel; WR | Recruit ratings: Scout: Rivals: 247Sports: ESPN: | | | | | |
| Wes Martin; OL | West Milton, Ohio | Milton-Union | 6 ft 3 in (1.91 m) | 295 lb (134 kg) | – | Jun 17, 2013 |
| Wes Martin; OL | Recruit ratings: Scout: Rivals: 247Sports: ESPN: | | | | | |
| Robert McCray; LB | Conyers, Georgia | Rockdale County | 6 ft 3 in (1.91 m) | 245 lb (111 kg) | – | Feb 5, 2014 |
| Robert McCray; LB | Recruit ratings: Scout: Rivals: 247Sports: (NR) | | | | | |
| Derrian Meminger; DT | Sparta, Georgia | Hancock Central | 6 ft 4 in (1.93 m) | 270 lb (120 kg) | – | Feb 5, 2014 |
| Derrian Meminger; DT | Recruit ratings: Scout: Rivals: 247Sports: (NR) | | | | | |
| Tommy Mister; ATH | Chicago, Illinois | St. Rita | 6 ft 0 in (1.83 m) | 198 lb (90 kg) | – | Jan 18, 2014 |
| Tommy Mister; ATH | Recruit ratings: Scout: Rivals: 247Sports: ESPN: | | | | | |
| Devine Redding; RB | Cleveland, Ohio | Glenville Academic | 5 ft 9 in (1.75 m) | 203 lb (92 kg) | – | Oct 20, 2013 |
| Devine Redding; RB | Recruit ratings: Scout: Rivals: 247Sports: ESPN: | | | | | |
| Tegray Scales; LB | Cincinnati, Ohio | Colerain | 6 ft 0 in (1.83 m) | 206 lb (93 kg) | 4.7 | Jan 19, 2014 |
| Tegray Scales; LB | Recruit ratings: Scout: Rivals: 247Sports: ESPN: | | | | | |
| Nile Sykes; LB | Oak Park, Illinois | Montini | 6 ft 2 in (1.88 m) | 223 lb (101 kg) | Jul 4, 2014 | |
| Nile Sykes; LB | Recruit ratings: Scout: Rivals: 247Sports: ESPN: | | | | | |
| Zeke Walker; DB | Columbia, South Carolina | Brookland-Cayce | 6 ft 2 in (1.88 m) | 205 lb (93 kg) | 4.5 | Feb 5, 2014 |
| Zeke Walker; DB | Recruit ratings: Scout: Rivals: 247Sports: ESPN: | | | | | |
| Kiante Walton; DB | Columbus, Georgia | Carver | 5 ft 10 in (1.78 m) | 190 lb (86 kg) | – | Feb 2, 2014 |
| Kiante Walton; DB | Recruit ratings: Scout: Rivals: 247Sports: (NR) | | | | | |
| Dameon Willis; LB | Cleveland, Ohio | Saint Ignatius | 6 ft 0 in (1.83 m) | 209 lb (95 kg) | 4.5 | Oct 2, 2013 |
| Dameon Willis; LB | Recruit ratings: Scout: Rivals: 247Sports: ESPN: | | | | | |
Overall recruit ranking: Scout: 45 Rivals: 38 247Sports: 51 ESPN: 55
Note: In many cases, Scout, Rivals, 247Sports, On3, and ESPN may conflict in their listings of height and weight.; In these cases, the average was taken. ESPN grades are on a 100-point scale.; Sources: "Indiana Football Commitments". Rivals.; "2014 Indiana Football Commits". Scout.; "ESPN". ESPN.; "Scout.com Team Recruiting Rankings". Scout.; "2014 Team Ranking". Rivals.com.

== Schedule ==
| Date | Time | Opponent | Site | TV | Result | Attendance |
|---|---|---|---|---|---|---|
| August 30 | 12:00 pm | Indiana State* | Memorial Stadium; Bloomington, IN | ESPNews | W 28–10 | 38,006 |
| September 13 | 12:00 pm | at Bowling Green* | Doyt Perry Stadium; Bowling Green, OH | ESPNU | L 42–45 | 23,717 |
| September 20 | 4:00 pm | at No. 18 Missouri* | Faurot Field; Columbia, MO | SECN | W 31–27 | 66,455 |
| September 27 | 1:30 pm | Maryland | Memorial Stadium; Bloomington, IN | BTN | L 15–37 | 44,313 |
| October 4 | 2:30 pm | North Texas* | Memorial Stadium; Bloomington, IN | BTN | W 49–24 | 40,457 |
| October 11 | 12:00 pm | at Iowa | Kinnick Stadium; Iowa City, IA | ESPNU | L 29–45 | 68,590 |
| October 18 | 3:30 pm | No. 8 Michigan State^{†} | Memorial Stadium; Bloomington, IN (rivalry) | ESPN | L 17–56 | 44,403 |
| November 1 | 3:30 pm | at Michigan | Michigan Stadium; Ann Arbor, MI | BTN | L 10–34 | 103,111 |
| November 8 | 12:00 pm | Penn State | Memorial Stadium; Bloomington, IN | BTN | L 7–13 | 42,683 |
| November 15 | 3:30 pm | at Rutgers | High Point Solutions Stadium; Piscataway, NJ | BTN | L 23–45 | 47,492 |
| November 22 | 12:00 pm | at No. 7 Ohio State | Ohio Stadium; Columbus, OH | BTN | L 27–42 | 101,426 |
| November 29 | 12:00 pm | Purdue | Memorial Stadium; Bloomington, IN (Old Oaken Bucket) | BTN | W 23–16 | 40,079 |
*Non-conference game; ^{†}Homecoming; Rankings from AP Poll released prior to the game; All times are in Eastern time

== Personnel ==
=== Coaching staff ===
| Name | Position | Seasons at Indiana | Alma mater |
|---|---|---|---|
| Kevin Wilson | Head coach | 4th | North Carolina (1984, M.Ed. 1987) |
| Kevin Johns | Offensive coordinator, QB & WR | 4th | Dayton (1998), Northwestern (M.Ed. 2001) |
| Brian Knorr | Defensive coordinator, DE & OLB | 1st | Air Force (1986), Dayton (M.S. 1991) |
| Greg Frey | Co-Offensive Coordinator, OL | 4th | Florida State (1996) |
| William Inge | Co-Defensive coordinator, LB | 2nd | Iowa (1996, M.S. 1999) |
| Deland McCullough | Running Backs | 4th | Miami (OH) (1996) |
| Larry McDaniel | Defensive Line | 1st | Indiana (1993) |
| James Patton | TE & FB, Off. Recruiting Coord. | 2nd | Miami (OH) (1993, M.S. 1995) |
| Brandon Shelby | Cornerbacks | 4th | Oklahoma (2004, M.S. 2005) |
| Noah Joseph | S, Def. Recruiting Coord. | 1st | Drake (1999), Iowa State (M.S. 2003) |
| Mark Hill | Head Strength & Conditioning | 4th | UT-Chattanooga (1999) |

=== Roster ===
2014 Indiana Hoosiers football team roster
Players
Coaches
Offense

| Pos. | # | Name | Class |
|---|---|---|---|
| QB | 2 | Chris Covington | Fr |
| WR | 3 | Dominique Booth | Fr |
| WR | 4 | Ricky Jones | So |
| WR | 5 | J-Shun Harris | Fr |
| RB | 6 | Tevin Coleman (C) | Jr |
| QB | 7 | Nate Sudfeld | Jr |
| QB | 9 | Nate Boudreau | So |
| WR | 10 | Simmie Cobbs | Fr |
| QB | 12 | Zander Diamont | Fr |
| WR | 13 | Coray Keel | Fr |
| WR | 14 | Nick Stoner | Sr |
| WR | 15 | Isaiah Roundtree | Sr |
| QB | 16 | Bryce Smith | Fr |
| WR | 17 | Isaac Griffith | Fr |
| QB | 18 | Danny Cameron | Fr |
| QB | 19 | Max Matthews | Jr |
| RB | 20 | D'Angelo Roberts | Sr |
| RB | 21 | Andrew Wilson | So |
| WR | 24 | Danny Dunn | Fr |
| RB | 25 | Tommy Mister | Fr |
| WR | 28 | Nick Cox | Fr |
| RB | 28 | Anthony Davis | Jr |
| WR | 31 | Andre Booker | Jr |
| RB | 33 | Ricky Brookins | Fr |
| RB | 34 | Devine Redding | Fr |
| RB | 36 | Myles Graham | Fr |
| RB | 37 | Alex Rodriguez | Fr |
| WR | 38 | Damon Graham | Jr |
| FB | 46 | Mike Replogle | Sr |
| C | 50 | Jake Reed | Jr |
| OL | 52 | Gavin Peacock | Fr |
| OL | 57 | Tim Gardner | Fr |
| OT | 59 | Peyton Eckert | Jr |
| OT | 62 | Ralston Evans | Jr |
| OL | 63 | Tyler Lukens | Jr |
| C | 64 | Collin Rahrig (C) | Sr |
| C | 65 | Wes Rogers | So |
| OL | 67 | Dan Feeney | So |
| OL | 68 | David Kaminiski | Jr |
| OL | 69 | Blake Biesen | Fr |
| OL | 70 | Jacob Bailey | So |
| OL | 71 | Delroy Baker | Fr |
| OL | 73 | Bernard Taylor | Sr |
| OL | 74 | DeAndre Herron | Jr |
| OL | 76 | Wes Martin | Fr |
| OT | 77 | Dimitric Camiel | So |
| OT | 78 | Jason Spriggs | Jr |
| TE | 81 | Jordan Fuchs | Fr |
| TE | 84 | Danny Friend | So |
| TE | 85 | Michael Cooper | Jr |
| WR | 86 | Chandler Miller | So |
| WR | 87 | Mitchell Paige | So |
| TE | 88 | Anthony Corsaro | Jr |
| TE | 94 | Sean Damaska | So |
| TE | 95 | Chandler Watson | Jr |
| TE | 96 | Christian Englum | So |

Defense

| Pos. | # | Name | Class |
|---|---|---|---|
| LB | 2 | T. J. Simmons | So |
| BAN | 4 | Forisse Hardin | Sr |
| CB | 7 | Donovan Clark | Fr |
| LB | 8 | Tegray Scales | Fr |
| S | 9 | Will Dawkins | Fr |
| S | 10 | Matt Skowronek | Fr |
| CB | 12 | Noel Padmore | Fr |
| CB | 15 | Ben Bach | Fr |
| S | 15 | Zeke Walker | Fr |
| CB | 16 | Rashard Fant | Fr |
| CB | 17 | Michael Hunter | Jr |
| S | 18 | Tyler Brady | So |
| S | 19 | Tony Fields | Fr |
| S | 21 | Ty Smith | Fr |
| CB | 22 | Kenny Mullen | Sr |
| LB | 23 | Owen Mattingly | Fr |
| CB | 23 | Laray Smith | So |
| CB | 24 | Tim Bennett | Sr |
| CB | 25 | Mario Swann | Fr |
| S | 26 | Kiante Walton | Fr |
| LB | 27 | Steven Funderburk | Sr |
| S | 27 | Arthur Jones | Fr |
| BAN | 29 | Dawson Fletcher | Jr |
| S | 30 | Chase Dutra | Fr |
| CB | 31 | Derek Driver | Fr |
| BAN | 33 | Zach Shaw | Jr |
| S | 34 | Mike Warner | Fr |
| LB | 35 | Nile Sykes | Fr |
| S | 37 | Mark Murphy | Sr |
| S | 38 | Garrett Welch | So |
| BAN | 39 | Dameon Willis, Jr. | Fr |
| DB | 40 | Antonio Allen | So |
| BAN | 41 | Clyde Newton | So |
| LB | 42 | David Cooper | Sr |
| S | 43 | Brandon Grubbe | Sr |
| LB | 44 | Marcus Oliver | So |
| BAN | 45 | Tony Thomas | So |
| BAN | 46 | Ryan Watercutter | Fr |
| BAN | 47 | Robert McCray | Fr |
| LB | 48 | Marcus Mabry | Jr |
| LB | 49 | Greg Gooch | Fr |
| LB | 51 | Kyle Kennedy | Jr |
| DT | 53 | Shawn Heffern | So |
| LB | 54 | Garrett Libertowski | Jr |
| DT | 55 | Nick Carovillano | Fr |
| BAN | 56 | Nick Meminger | Jr |
| LB | 57 | Kyle Loechel | Jr |
| DT | 58 | Patrick Dougherty | Fr |
| LB | 60 | Danny Banks | Fr |
| LB | 61 | Dylan Banks | Fr |
| LB | 63 | Kenny Arnold | Fr |
| DT | 72 | Derrian Meminger | Fr |
| DT | 74 | Nate Hoff | Fr |
| DT | 75 | Mike Barwick, Jr. | Fr |
| DT | 90 | Eric Kayne | Fr |
| DT | 92 | Christopher Cormier | Sr |
| DT | 93 | Ralph Green III | So |
| DT | 95 | Bobby Richardson (C) | Sr |
| DT | 97 | Jordan Heiderman | Sr |
| DT | 98 | Darius Latham | So |
| DT | 99 | Adarius Rayner | Jr |

Special teams

| Pos. | # | Name | Class |
|---|---|---|---|
| LS | 46 | Nolan Guedel | Fr |
| LS | 66 | Josh Pericht | Fr |
| P | 86 | Joseph Gedeon | Fr |
| PK | 87 | Ben Rice | Fr |
| PK | 89 | Jake Shake | Fr |
| PK | 90 | Aaron Del Grosso | Fr |
| LS | 91 | Matt Dooley | Sr |
| PK | 92 | Griffin Oakes | Fr |
| P | 93 | Nick Campos | So |

Head coach

- Kevin R. Wilson

Coordinators/assistant coaches

- Kevin Johns (Offensive Coordinator / Quarterbacks / Wide Receivers)
- Brian Knorr (Defensive coordinator / Defensive Ends / Outside Linebackers)
- Greg Frey (Co-Offensive Coordinator / Offensive Line)
- William Inge (Co-Defensive coordinator / Linebackers)
- Deland McCullough (Running Backs)
- Larry McDaniel (Defensive Line)
- James Patton (Tight Ends / Fullbacks / Offensive Recruiting Coordinator)
- Brandon Shelby (Cornerbacks)
- Noah Joseph (Safities / Defensive Recruiting Coordinator)
- Mark Hill (Head Strength and Conditioning Coach)
- Brian Lepak (Offensive Graduate Assistant)
- Kasey Teegardin (Defensive Graduate Assistant)
- Carter Whitson (Offensive Graduate Assistant)
- Elliott Wratten (Defensive Graduate Assistant)
- Billy Ray Johnson (Assistant AD for Football Administration)
- Mike Pechac (Director of Player Development & Academic Enhancement)
- Jeff Sims (Senior Director of Player Personnel)
- Ryan McInerney (Quality Control - Recruiting/Defense)
- Courtney Messingham (Quality Control - Recruiting/Offense)

Legend

- (C) Team captain
- (S) Suspended
- (I) Ineligible
- Injured
- Redshirt

== 2015 NFL draftees ==
| Player | Round | Pick | Position | NFL club |
|---|---|---|---|---|
| Tevin Coleman | 3 | 73 | Running back | Atlanta Falcons |
