= 2014 Purdue Boilermakers football team =

American college football season

2014 Purdue Boilermakers football
- Conference: Big Ten Conference
- West Division
- Record: 3–9 (1–7 Big Ten)
- Head coach: Darrell Hazell (2nd season)
- Offensive coordinator: John Shoop (2nd season)
- Offensive scheme: Pro-style/Single back
- Defensive coordinator: Greg Hudson (2nd season)
- Base defense: 3–4 or 4–3
- Captains: Justin Sinz; Robert Kugler; Ryan Russell; Sean Robinson
- Home stadium: Ross–Ade Stadium

2014 Big Ten Conference football standings
	Conf.			Overall
Team	W		L	W		L
East Division
No. 1 Ohio State x$#^	8	–	0	14	–	1
No. T–5 Michigan State	7	–	1	11	–	2
Maryland	4	–	4	7	–	6
Rutgers	3	–	5	8	–	5
Michigan	3	–	5	5	–	7
Penn State	2	–	6	7	–	6
Indiana	1	–	7	4	–	8
West Division
No. 13 Wisconsin x	7	–	1	11	–	3
Minnesota	5	–	3	8	–	5
Nebraska	5	–	3	9	–	4
Iowa	4	–	4	7	–	6
Illinois	3	–	5	6	–	7
Northwestern	3	–	5	5	–	7
Purdue	1	–	7	3	–	9
Championship: Ohio State 59, Wisconsin 0
# – College Football Playoff champion; ^ – College Football Playoff participant; $ – Conference champion; x – Division champion/co-champions; Rankings from AP Poll

The 2014 Purdue Boilermakers football team was an American football team that represented Purdue University during the 2014 NCAA Division I FBS football season. The Boilermakers played in the new West Division of the Big Ten Conference and played their home games at Ross–Ade Stadium in West Lafayette, Indiana. The team was led by head coach Darrell Hazell, who was in his second season at Purdue. Purdue finished the season with a record of 3–9, 1–7 in Big Ten play to finish in last place in the West Division. This marked the first time since 1993 that Purdue finished with the worst record in the Big Ten in back-to-back seasons.

== Preseason ==
The 2013 team compiled a 1–11 record under first-year head coach Darrell Hazell.

Hazell announced that the quarterback position was an open battle prior to spring practice, notably including sophomore Danny Etling, red-shirt sophomore Austin Appleby and true freshman David Blough. On August 18, 2014, Hazell named Etling the starting quarterback.

=== Transfers in ===
Ian MacDougall transferred from Wabash College to pursue his master's degree and placekick.

Parker Flynn, a former Arizona State walk-on kicker, transferred to Purdue.

=== Transfers out ===
In January, linebacker Armstead Williams transferred to Duquesne.

Tight End, Ryan Morris transferred to Villanova.

In May, running back Dalyn Dawkins transferred from Purdue to Colorado State.

In July, linebacker Ruben Ibarra transferred to Arizona State.

Quarterback Erich Berzinskas and wide receiver Aloyis Gray transferred to Arizona Western College.

== Recruiting ==
=== Position key ===
Back	B	Center	C	Cornerback	CB	Defensive back	DB
Defensive end	DE	Defensive lineman	DL	Defensive tackle	DT	End	E
Fullback	FB	Guard	G	Halfback	HB	Kicker	K
Kickoff returner	KR	Offensive tackle	OT	Offensive lineman	OL	Linebacker	LB
Long snapper	LS	Punter	P	Punt returner	PR	Quarterback	QB
Running back	RB	Safety	S	Tight end	TE	Wide receiver	WR

=== Recruits ===
Purdue's recruiting class was ranked No. 68 by Scout No. 72 by Rivals and No. 69 by ESPN. The program received 18 letters of intent on National Signing Day, February 5, 2013. Almost 3 weeks after NSD, Purdue signed David Hedelin, a junior college transfer, who had to sit out the first 3 games of the season due to playing professionally in Sweden for 2 seasons. Kicker Austin McGehee enrolled at Purdue, but transferred in late July to Arkansas State. Also in late July, Darrell Hazell announced that Juan Jenkins would not likely make it to campus due to academic issues.

College recruiting
Name	Hometown	School	Height	Weight	40^{‡}	Commit date
Kirk Barron; C	Mishawaka, Indiana	Marian H.S.	6 ft 2 in (1.88 m)	294 lb (133 kg)	5.1	Jun 15, 2014
Kirk Barron; C	Recruit ratings: Scout: Rivals: 247Sports: ESPN:					
Ja'Whaun Bentley; LB	Glenarden, Maryland	DeMatha H.S.	6 ft 2 in (1.88 m)	245 lb (111 kg)	4.7	Dec 7, 2013
Ja'Whaun Bentley; LB	Recruit ratings: Scout: Rivals: 247Sports: ESPN:					
David Blough; QB	Carrollton, Texas	Creekview H.S.	6 ft 1 in (1.85 m)	187 lb (85 kg)	4.6	Jun 15, 2013
David Blough; QB	Recruit ratings: Scout: Rivals: 247Sports: ESPN:					
Tim Cason; DB	Clarkston, Michigan	Clarkston H.S.	6 ft 0 in (1.83 m)	181 lb (82 kg)	-	Oct 7, 2013
Tim Cason; DB	Recruit ratings: Scout: Rivals: 247Sports: ESPN:					
Corey Clements; OT	Birmingham, Alabama	Mesa C.C.	6 ft 3 in (1.91 m)	330 lb (150 kg)	-	Feb 1, 2014
Corey Clements; OT	Recruit ratings: Scout: Rivals: 247Sports: ESPN:					
Will Colmery; DE	Western Spring, Illinois	Nazareth Academy	6 ft 5 in (1.96 m)	248 lb (112 kg)	-	Nov 1, 2013
Will Colmery; DE	Recruit ratings: Scout: Rivals: 247Sports: ESPN:					
Cedric Dale; CB/RB	Dallas, Texas	Hebron H.S.	5 ft 8 in (1.73 m)	167 lb (76 kg)	4.4	Mar 10, 2014
Cedric Dale; CB/RB	Recruit ratings: Scout: Rivals: 247Sports: ESPN:					
Trae Hart; WR	Mesquite, Texas	First Baptist Academy of Dallas	5 ft 11 in (1.80 m)	154 lb (70 kg)	4.4	May 4, 2013
Trae Hart; WR	Recruit ratings: Scout: Rivals: 247Sports: ESPN:					
David Heledin; OT	Stockholm, Sweden	City College of San Francisco	6 ft 5 in (1.96 m)	285 lb (129 kg)	4.9	Feb 27, 2014
David Heledin; OT	Recruit ratings: Scout: Rivals: 247Sports: ESPN:					
Cole Herdman; TE	Leesburg, Virginia	Flint Hill H.S.	6 ft 4 in (1.93 m)	225 lb (102 kg)	-	Dec 16, 2013
Cole Herdman; TE	Recruit ratings: Scout: Rivals: 247Sports: ESPN:					
Juan Jenkins; S	Gainesville, Florida	Gainesville H.S.	6 ft 0 in (1.83 m)	195 lb (88 kg)	-	Dec 15, 2013
Juan Jenkins; S	Recruit ratings: Scout: Rivals: 247Sports: ESPN:					
Keiwan Jones; DT	Ocala, Florida	Dunnellon H.S.	6 ft 2 in (1.88 m)	251 lb (114 kg)	-	Dec 9, 2013
Keiwan Jones; DT	Recruit ratings: Scout: Rivals: 247Sports: ESPN:					
Dexter Knox; RB	Fairburn, Georgia	Creekside H.S.	5 ft 9 in (1.75 m)	200 lb (91 kg)	-	Dec 17, 2013
Dexter Knox; RB	Recruit ratings: Scout: Rivals: 247Sports: ESPN:					
Austin McGehee; K	Pine Bluff, Arkansas	Pine Bluff H.S.	6 ft 1 in (1.85 m)	200 lb (91 kg)	4.7	Jun 28, 2013
Austin McGehee; K	Recruit ratings: Scout: Rivals: 247Sports: ESPN:					
Martesse Patterson; OL	Columbus, Ohio	Marion-Franklin H.S.	6 ft 3 in (1.91 m)	310 lb (140 kg)	-	Dec 15, 2013
Martesse Patterson; OL	Recruit ratings: Scout: Rivals: 247Sports: ESPN:					
Gregory Phillips; WR	Lithonia, Georgia	Arabia Mountain H.S.	5 ft 11 in (1.80 m)	180 lb (82 kg)	-	May 31, 2013
Gregory Phillips; WR	Recruit ratings: Scout: Rivals: 247Sports: ESPN:					
Brandon Roberts; CB	Naylor, Georgia	Lowndes H.S.	6 ft 0 in (1.83 m)	185 lb (84 kg)	-	Dec 10, 2013
Brandon Roberts; CB	Recruit ratings: Scout: Rivals: 247Sports: ESPN:					
Gelen Robinson; DE	Schererville, Indiana	Lake Central H.S.	6 ft 1 in (1.85 m)	231 lb (105 kg)	-	Jul 8, 2013
Gelen Robinson; DE	Recruit ratings: Scout: Rivals: 247Sports: ESPN:					
Bearooz Yacoobi; OT	Dearborn, Michigan	Dearborn H.S.	6 ft 5 in (1.96 m)	260 lb (120 kg)	-	Jan 19, 2014
Bearooz Yacoobi; OT	Recruit ratings: Scout: Rivals: 247Sports: ESPN:					
Overall recruit ranking: Scout: 68 Rivals: 72 247Sports: 69 ESPN: 69
Note: In many cases, Scout, Rivals, 247Sports, On3, and ESPN may conflict in their listings of height and weight.; In these cases, the average was taken. ESPN grades are on a 100-point scale.; Sources: "Purdue Football Commitments". Rivals.; "2014 Purdue Football Commits". Scout.; "ESPN". ESPN.; "Scout.com Team Recruiting Rankings". Scout.; "2014 Team Ranking". Rivals.com.; "2014 Purdue Boilermakers football team". 247Sports.

== Schedule ==
Date	Time	Opponent	Site	TV	Result	Attendance
August 30	12:00 pm	Western Michigan*	Ross–Ade Stadium; West Lafayette, IN	ESPNU	W 43–34	37,031
September 6	12:00 pm	Central Michigan*	Ross–Ade Stadium; West Lafayette, IN	ESPNews	L 17–38	36,410
September 13	7:30 pm	vs. No. 11 Notre Dame*	Lucas Oil Stadium; Indianapolis, IN (Battle for the Shillelagh Trophy)	NBC	L 14–30	56,832
September 20	12:00 pm	No. 16 (FCS) Southern Illinois*	Ross–Ade Stadium; West Lafayette, IN	BTN	W 35–13	31,434
September 27	12:00 pm	Iowa^{†}	Ross–Ade Stadium; West Lafayette, IN	BTN	L 10–24	36,603
October 4	12:00 pm	at Illinois	Memorial Stadium; Champaign, IL (Battle for the Purdue Cannon)	ESPN2	W 38–27	45,046
October 11	3:30 pm	No. 8 Michigan State	Ross–Ade Stadium; West Lafayette, IN	ABC/ESPN2	L 31–45	40,217
October 18	12:00 pm	at Minnesota	TCF Bank Stadium; Minneapolis, MN	BTN	L 38–39	51,241
November 1	3:30 pm	at No. 17 Nebraska	Memorial Stadium; Lincoln, NE	ABC/ESPN2	L 14–35	91,107
November 8	12:00 pm	No. 25 Wisconsin	Ross–Ade Stadium; West Lafayette, IN	ESPNU	L 16–34	35,068
November 22	12:00 pm	Northwestern	Ross–Ade Stadium; West Lafayette, IN	ESPNU	L 14–38	30,117
November 29	12:00 pm	at Indiana	Memorial Stadium; Bloomington, IN (Old Oaken Bucket Game)	BTN	L 16–23	40,079
*Non-conference game; ^{†}Homecoming; Rankings from AP Poll released prior to the game; All times are in Eastern time

Schedule source:

== Game summaries ==
=== Vs. Western Michigan ===
Western Michigan at Purdue

Team	1	2	3	4	Total
Broncos	7	7	14	6	34
• Boilermakers	7	16	14	6	43

- Date: August 30
- Location: Ross–Ade Stadium
  West Lafayette, IN
- Game start: 12:01 p.m. EDT
- Elapsed time: 3:44
- Game attendance: 37,031
- Game weather: 77, Partly Cloudy, SSW 12 MPH
- Referee: Don Willard
- TV announcers (ESPNU): Adam Amin, John Congemi

Scoring summary
1	7:45	Purdue	Justin Sinz 1-yard pass from Danny Etling (Paul Griggs kick)	PUR 7–0
1	3:03	Western Michigan	Jarvion Franklin 5-yard run (Andrew Haldeman kick)	Tie 7–7
2	12:53	Purdue	Paul Griggs 35-yard field goal	PUR 10–7
2	11:16	Western Michigan	Jarvion Franklin 31-yard run (Andrew Haldeman kick)	WM 14–10
2	8:58	Purdue	Paul Griggs 51-yard field goal	WM 14–13
2	5:16	Purdue	Danny Etling 4-yard run (Paul Griggs kick)	PUR 20–14
2	:16	Purdue	Paul Griggs 44-yard field goal	PUR 23–14
3	4:27	Western Michigan	Jarvion Franklin 26-yard run (Andrew Haldeman kick)	PUR 23–21
3	8:01	Purdue	Raheem Mostert 11-yard run (Paul Griggs kick)	PUR 30-21
3	3:16	Purdue	Gabe Holmes 8-yard pass from Danny Etling	PUR 37-21
3	:41	Western Michigan	Kendrick Roberts 7-yard pass from Zach Terrell (Andrew Haldeman kick)	PUR 37–28
4	8:11	Western Michigan	Corey Davis 14-yard pass from Zach Terrell (Andrew Haldeman kick failed)	PUR 37-34
4	3:42	Purdue	Akeem Hunt 38-yard run (Pgaul Griggs kick)	PUR 43-34

Overall record	Previous meeting	Previous winner
3–0	December 27, 2011	Purdue, 37–32

=== Vs. Central Michigan ===
Central Michigan at Purdue

Team	1	2	3	4	Total
• Chippewas	14	7	7	10	38
Boilermakers	7	7	3	7	24

- Date: September 6
- Location: Ross–Ade Stadium
  West Lafayette, IN
- Game start: 12:01 p.m. EDT
- Elapsed time: 3:14
- Game attendance: 36,410
- Game weather: 65, Mostly Cloudy, NW 6 MPH
- Referee: Greg Blun
- TV announcers (ESPNews): Eamon McAnaney, Dan Hawkins

Scoring summary
1	10:30	Central Michigan	Brandon Greer 57-yard interception return (Brian Eavey kick)	CM 7–0
1	7:29	Central Michigan	Anthony Rice 65-yard pass from Cooper Rush (Brian Eavey kick)	CM 14–0
2	9:51	Purdue	Danny Etling 4-yard run	CM 14–7
2	7:48	Central Michigan	Thomas Rawls 2-yard run (Brian Eavey kick)	CM 21–7
3	10:38	Purdue	Paul Griggs 42-yard field goal	CM 21–10
3	7:03	Central Michigan	Ben McCord 11-yard pass from Cooper Rush (Brian Eavey kick)	CM 28–10
4	13:34	Central Michigan	Brian Eavey 23-yard field goal	CM 31–10
4	8:13	Purdue	Danny Anthrop 23-yard pass from Austin Appleby (Paul Griggs kick)	CM 31–17
4	3:44	Central Michigan	Thomas Rawls 16-yard run (Brian Eavey kick)	CM 38–17

Overall record	Previous meeting	Previous winner
5–0	September 20, 2008	Purdue, 32–25

== Depth chart ==
Starters and backups against for the final game of the season.

Defense

FS
Landon Feichter
Robert Gregory

WLB	ILB	ILB	SLB
Jalani Phillips	Ja'Whan Bentley	Danny Ezechukwu	Jimmy Herman
Gelen Robinson	Garrett Hudson	Andy James Garcia	Andy James Garcia

SS
Frankie Williams
Taylor Richards

CB
Anthony Brown
Antoine Lewis

DE	NT	DE
Ryan Russell	Ra'Zahn Howard	Jake Replogle
Evan Panfil	Ryan Watson	Ryan Watson

CB
Leroy Clark
Antoine Lewis

Offense

WR
DeAngelo Yancey
Gregory Phillips

WR
Cameron Posey
Shane Mikesky

LT	LG	C	RG	RT
David Hedelin	Jason King	Robert Kugler	Jordan Roos	J. J. Prince
Cameron Cermin	Jason Tretter	Cameron Cermin	Corey Clements	Cameron Cermin

TE
Gabe Holmes
Justin Sinz

WR
Trae Hart
Miles Norwood

QB
Austin Appleby
Danny Etling

Special teams
PK Paul Griggs
PK Ian MacDougall
P Thomas Meadows
KR Raheem Mostert / Trae Hart
PR Miles Norwood
LS Jesse Schmitt
H Thomas Meadows

RB
Raheem Mostert
Akeem Hunt

== Roster ==
2014 Purdue Boilermakers football team roster
Players
Coaches
Offense

Pos.	#	Name	Class
RB	1	Akeem Hunt	Sr
TE	3	Carlos Carvajal	So
RB	4	Keith Byers II	Fr
QB	5	Danny Etling	So
WR	6	Myles Norwood	Fr
WR	7	DeAngelo Yancey	So
RB	8	Raheem Mostert	Sr
WR	9	Dan Monteroso	So
TE	10	Matt Burke	Fr
QB	11	David Blough	Fr
QB	12	Austin Appleby	So
WR	13	Gregory Phillips	Fr
WR	14	Bilal Marshall	So
WR	15	Trae Hart	Fr
TE	17	Charles Torwudzo	Sr
WR	18	Camerson Posey	So
QB	19	Mathew Monserez	Fr
TE	21	Dolapo McCarthy	Sr
WR	21	Cedric Dale	Fr
TE	22	Jonathan Curry	So
RB	23	Keyante Green	Fr
RB	25	Brandon Cottom	Sr
RB	27	D. J. Knox	Fr
RB	28	David Yancey	Fr
WR	33	Danny Anthrop	Jr
TE	43	Jacob Anderson	Fr
RB	45	Lane Beeler	Fr
OL	51	Bearooz Yacoobi	Fr
OG/C	53	Kirk Barron	Fr
OT	54	Jack DeBoef	Sr
C	57	Robert Kugler (C)	Jr
OL	62	Wade Fisher	Fr
OL	64	Dakota Jelinek	Fr
OL	66	Cameron Cermin	So
OL	67	Eric Swingler	Fr
OL	70	Jordan Roos	So
OL	71	Corey Clements	Jr
OL	72	Jason King	So
OL	73	J. J. Prince	So
OL	74	Martesse Patterson	Fr
OT	75	David Heledin	Jr
OL	76	Jason Tretter	Fr
OL	77	Joey Warburg	So
OL	78	Colton Bahamonde	Fr
WR	80	Alex Egurbide	Fr
WR	81	Keenan Schon	Fr
WR	82	Alex Hilger	Fr
WR	83	B. J. Knauf	So
TE	84	Justin Sinz (C)	Sr
TE	85	Jordan Jurasevich	Fr
TE	86	Gabe Holmes	Sr
WR	87	Shane Mikesky	Jr
TE	88	Cole Herdman	Fr

Defense

Pos.	#	Name	Class
CB	1	Brandon Roberts	Fr
CB	2	Da'Wan Hunte	Fr
DB	3	Leroy Clark	So
DB	4	Taylor Richards	Sr
S	5	Austin Logan	So
S	7	Robert Gregory	So
CB	8	Tim Cason	Fr
DB	9	Anthony Brown	Jr
LB	10	Sean Robinson (C)	Sr
DE	11	Antoine Miles	Fr
LB	13	Gelen Robinson	Fr
DT	14	Ra'Zahn Howard	So
LB	16	Garret Hudson	Fr
S	17	Kyle Marzec	Jr
LB	19	Dezwan Polk-Campbell	Fr
LB	20	Johnny Thompson	Fr
CB	23	Antoine Lewis	Sr
DB	24	Frankie Williams	Jr
DB	25	Phil Taylor	Jr
SO	27	Evan Feichter	So
LB	29	Jimmy Herman	So
LB	32	Evan Pulliam	So
S	34	Sean Lydster	Fr
LB	35	Ja'Whaun Bentley	Fr
LB	36	Danny Ezechukwu	Fr
LB	39	Joe Gilliam	Sr
LB	40	Collin Link	Sr
S	41	Jacob Theineman	Fr
LB	42	Andy James Garcia	So
S	44	Landon Feichter	Sr
DB	46	Race Johnson	Fr
DT	50	Keiwan Jones	Fr
DE	51	John Strauser	Fr
DT	52	Johnny Daniels	Fr
DE	54	Jake Replogle	So
DE	55	Ryan DeBusk	So
DE	59	Langston Newton	So
DE	89	Jalani Phillips	Sr
DE	90	Will Colmery	Fr
DE	91	Conor Sweeney	Fr
DT	92	Ryan Watson	Jr
DE	95	Evan Panfil	So
DT	97	Michael Rouse III	Jr
DE	98	Will Schott	So
DE	99	Ryan Russell (C)	Sr

Special teams

Pos.	#	Name	Class
K	26	Ian MacDougall	Sr
K	30	Thomas Meadows	Jr
P	31	Parker Flynn	Sr
K	37	Paul Griggs	Jr
LS	50	Jesse Schmitt	Sr
LS	69	John Bednar	So
LS	94	Grant Ellington	Jr

Head coach

- Darrell Hazell

Coordinators/assistant coaches

- Greg Hudson (defensive coordinator)
- John Shoop (offensive coordinator / quarterbacks)
- Jim Bridge (offensive line)
- Rubin Carter (defensive line)
- Marcus Freeman (linebackers)
- Taver Johnson (defensive backs)
- Gerad Parker (Tight Ends / recruiting coordinator)
- Kevin Sherman (wide receivers)
- Jafar Williams (running backs)
- Logan Link (defensive graduate assistant)
- Brian Mason (defensive graduate assistant)
- John Nussman (offensive graduate assistant)
- Camden Wentz (offensive graduate assistant)
- Doug Boersma (Director of Sports Medicine)
- Duane Carlisle (Director of Sports Performance)
- Doug Davis (Senior Associate Director of Sports Performance)
- Casey Nuss (High School Relations Director)
- Mike Waugh (Director of player personnel)

Legend

- (C) Team captain
- (S) Suspended
- (I) Ineligible
- Injured
- Redshirt

Roster
Last update: December 5, 2014
