= Cedric Thompson =

American football player (born 1993)

Cedric Thompson Jr.
No. 41
- Position: Safety

Personal information
- Born: February 10, 1993 (age 33); Los Angeles, California, U.S.
- Listed height: 6 ft 0 in (1.83 m)
- Listed weight: 210 lb (95 kg)

Career information
- High school: Calipatria (CA)
- College: Minnesota
- NFL draft: 2015: 5th round, 150th overall pick

Career history
- Miami Dolphins (2015)*; New England Patriots (2015–2016)*; Minnesota Vikings (2016–2017)*; Cincinnati Bengals (2017)*
- * Offseason or practice squad member only
- Stats at Pro Football Reference

Cedric Thompson Jr. (born February 10, 1993) is an American former professional football safety. He played college football at Minnesota.

== Early life ==
Born in Los Angeles, Thompson grew up in Bombay Beach, California. He has two siblings, brother Tedric and sister Cedrinae. He became one of the primary subjects of the 2011 documentary Bombay Beach directed by Alma Har'el. He later cited boredom in Bombay Beach as his inspiration for professional football.

== Professional career ==
Pre-draft measurables
Height	Weight	Arm length	Hand span	40-yard dash	10-yard split	20-yard split	20-yard shuttle	Three-cone drill	Vertical jump	Broad jump	Bench press
5 ft 11 1/2 in (1.82 m)	211 lb (96 kg)	31 in (0.79 m)	10 1/4 in (0.26 m)	4.46 s	1.58 s	2.64 s	4.28 s	6.94 s	40.5 in (1.03 m)	10 ft 2 in (3.10 m)	21 reps
All values from Pro Day

=== Miami Dolphins ===
He was drafted by the Miami Dolphins in the fifth round of the 2015 NFL draft with the 150th overall pick.

=== New England Patriots ===
On January 12, 2016, the New England Patriots signed Thompson to their practice squad after he was not offered a futures contract with Miami. On January 26, Thompson signed a futures contract with the Patriots. On August 21, Thompson was released by the Patriots.

=== Minnesota Vikings ===
On October 25, 2016, Thompson was signed to the Minnesota Vikings' practice squad. He was released by the Vikings on November 26, and was re-signed again to the practice squad on December 5. Thompson signed a reserve/futures contract with the Vikings on January 2, 2017. On May 4, he was waived by the Vikings.

=== Cincinnati Bengals ===
On July 31, 2017, Thompson signed with the Cincinnati Bengals. He was waived by the Bengals on August 19.

On May 13, 2018, he announced his retirement from professional football in a YouTube video on his channel.

== Personal life ==
On July 13, 2016, Thompson married his college sweetheart Charlotte Annabelle Paguyo, whom he met while attending the University of Minnesota, in Minneapolis. On Thursday August 3, 2017, the Thompsons welcomed daughter Madeline Parker Thompson. The family currently resides in Minneapolis.

Thompson is the brother of Tedric Thompson, who was drafted by the Seattle Seahawks in the 2017 NFL draft.

Thompson has a YouTube channel that he started on September 29, 2016, called asCEDbyme; In which he focuses on family, faith, football, film, and his hair transplant experience.
