= Ameer Abdullah =

American football player (born 1993)

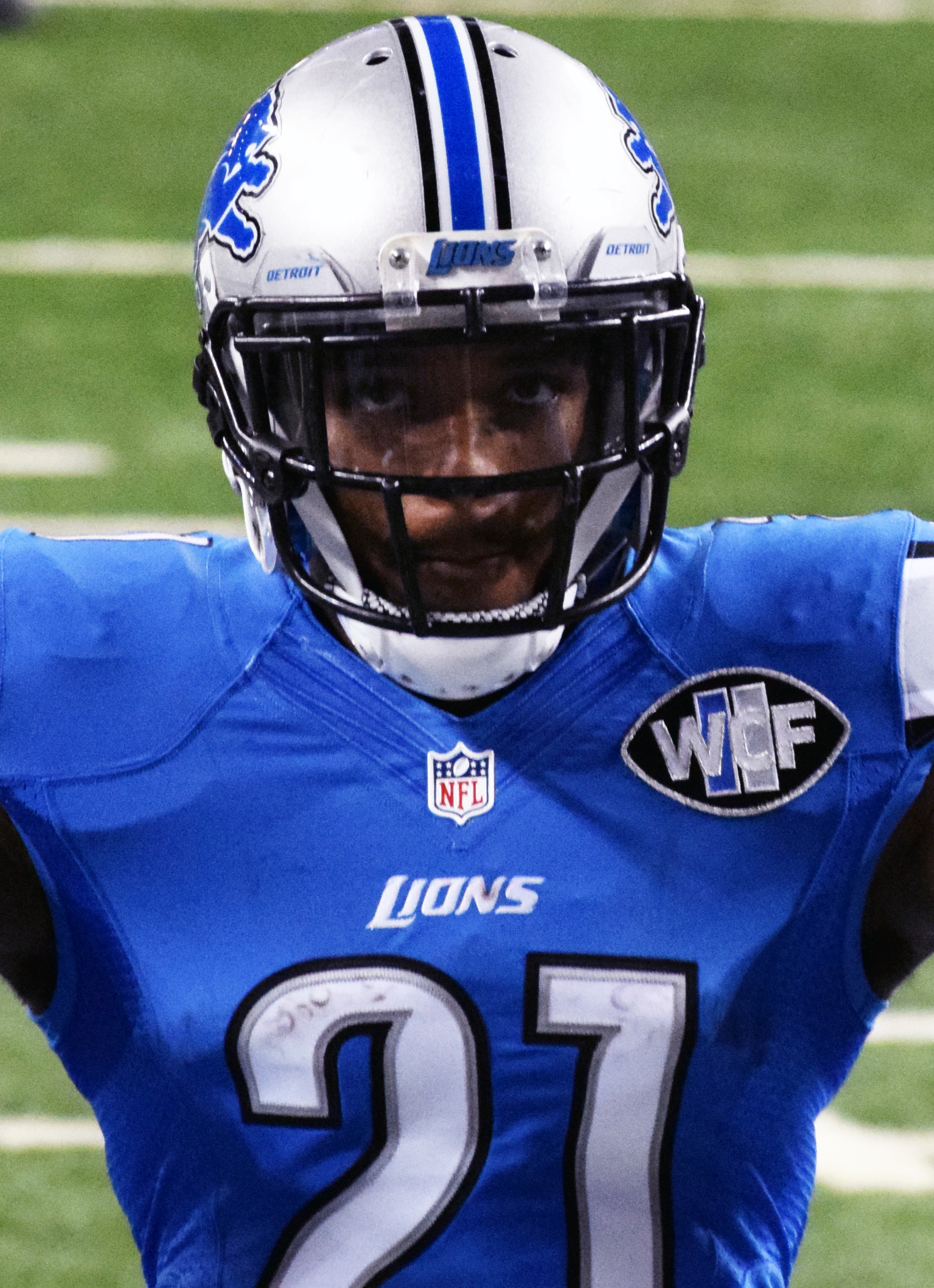
- Abdullah with the Detroit Lions in 2015

No. 20 – Jacksonville Jaguars
- Position: Running back
- Roster status: Active

Personal information
- Born: June 13, 1993 (age 33); Homewood, Alabama, U.S.
- Listed height: 5 ft 9 in (1.75 m)
- Listed weight: 203 lb (92 kg)

Career information
- High school: Homewood (AL)
- College: Nebraska (2011–2014)
- NFL draft: 2015: 2nd round, 54th overall pick

Career history
- Detroit Lions (2015–2018); Minnesota Vikings (2018–2021); Carolina Panthers (2021); Las Vegas Raiders (2022–2024); San Francisco 49ers (2025)*; Indianapolis Colts (2025); Jacksonville Jaguars (2026–present)
- * Offseason or practice squad member only

Awards and highlights
- NFL kickoff return yards leader (2015); First-team All-Big Ten (2013); 2× Second-team All-Big Ten (2012, 2014)

Career NFL statistics as of Week 10, 2026
- Rushing yards: 2,142
- Rushing average: 4.0
- Receptions: 221
- Receiving yards: 1,569
- Return yards: 4,867
- Total touchdowns: 20
- Stats at Pro Football Reference

Ameer Abdullah (born June 13, 1993) is an American professional football running back for the Jacksonville Jaguars of the National Football League (NFL). He was selected by the Detroit Lions in the second round of the 2015 NFL draft. He played college football for the Nebraska Cornhuskers. In 2013, Abdullah rushed for 1,690 yards, fourth most for a single season in University of Nebraska history. He decided not to enter the NFL draft at the end of his junior year, but instead to return for his senior season. He was considered a contender for the 2014 Heisman Trophy. He is a native of Homewood, Alabama.

== Early life ==
During his senior year of high school, Abdullah had 1,800 yards rushing, 515 yards receiving, and four punt returns for touchdowns for Homewood High School. He was the 2010 South region player of the year. In the 2010 Mississippi-Alabama All-Star Classic, he scored the winning touchdown in overtime.

Also a track star at Homewood, he ran a career-best time of 11.15 seconds in the 100 meters at the 2011 AHSAA 6A Section 3 Championships, placing 7th in the prelims. He also competed in the long jump; he had a career-best leap of 6.60 meters.

== College career ==
=== College decision ===
Abdullah was offered football scholarships from several schools, but schools such as Alabama and Auburn wanted him to play cornerback, while he wanted to be a running back. Nebraska coach Bo Pelini, however, while making no guarantees, told him that they would put him in a position that would maximize his talent. Pelini's view was the critical factor in Abdullah choosing Nebraska.

=== 2011 ===
Abdullah was one of six true freshman to play for Nebraska in the 2011 season. His best game was against Fresno State when he had 228 return yards. He had 211 kickoff return yards including a 100-yard touchdown return. Abdullah's total kickoff return yards broke the previous Nebraska record. His best running total was 36 yards and his longest run was 24 yards, both against the Wyoming Cowboys. On November 12, against Penn State, he had his first collegiate rushing touchdown. Overall, in the 2011 season, he finished with 150 rushing yards, three rushing touchdowns, 26 kick returns for 763 net yards and a touchdown, and 15 punt returns for 107 net yards.

=== 2012 ===
After Rex Burkhead was injured, Abdullah started seven games. His first start was against UCLA and he rushed for 119 yards with two touchdowns. His longest run was for 45 yards against Arkansas State in a 167-yard and two-touchdown performance. In the next game against Idaho State, he had a punt return touchdown. He had 252 all-purpose yards against Wisconsin, which included five kickoffs totaling 142 yards, 10 rushes for 70 yards, and 22 yards receiving. Against Penn State, he rushed for 116 yards and 1,000 rushing yards for the first time in his college career. His per game average of 134.5 all-purpose yards ranked fourth in the Big Ten Conference and his per game average of 81.2 rushing yards ranked ninth. Overall, he finished the 2012 season with 1,137 rushing yards, eight rushing touchdowns, 24 receptions, 178 receiving yards, two receiving touchdowns, and a punt return touchdown.

=== 2013 ===
Abdullah rushed for over 100 yards in 11 of 13 games (including the Gator Bowl). The ten 100-yard games during the regular season placed him fourth in Nebraska school history. On August 31, he started the season with 114 rushing yards against Wyoming. In the next game against Southern Miss, he had 114 rushing yards and two rushing touchdowns. After going for 98 yards against UCLA, he had 139 rushing yards and a touchdown against South Dakota State. He achieved a career-high rushing against Illinois of 225 yards. He followed that up with 126 rushing yards and a touchdown in the game against Purdue. In the next game, at Minnesota, he had 165 rushing yards. On November 9, against Michigan, he had 105 rushing yards, one rushing touchdown, and a receiving touchdown in the victory. In the next game, against Michigan State, he had 123 rushing yards and a 12-yard receiving touchdown. In the following game, against Penn State, he had 147 rushing yards and 18 receiving yards. For the season, he rushed for an average of 130.7 yards per game, which ranked him second in the Big Ten and seventh nationally. He had 232 yards in pass receptions and averaged 154.9 all-purpose yards per game, which also ranked him second in the Big Ten. He was placed on the All-Big Ten first-team by both the conference's coaches and media. He was a semifinalist for the Doak Walker Award. He finished the season with 122 rushing yards and a rushing touchdown victory over Georgia in the Gator Bowl. Overall, in the 2013 season, he finished with 1,690 rushing yards, nine rushing touchdowns, 26 receptions, 232 receiving yards, and two receiving touchdowns.

After the Gator Bowl, Abdullah considered whether he should enter the 2014 NFL draft as an underclassman. On January 9, 2014, he decided to stay at Nebraska for his senior season, stating that

I have come to realize that life is bigger than football ... and that my chances of long-term success in life will be greatly enhanced by completing my college education. ... If playing in the NFL is truly in God's plans for me, then God will again present this opportunity to me after I complete my college education.

=== 2014 ===
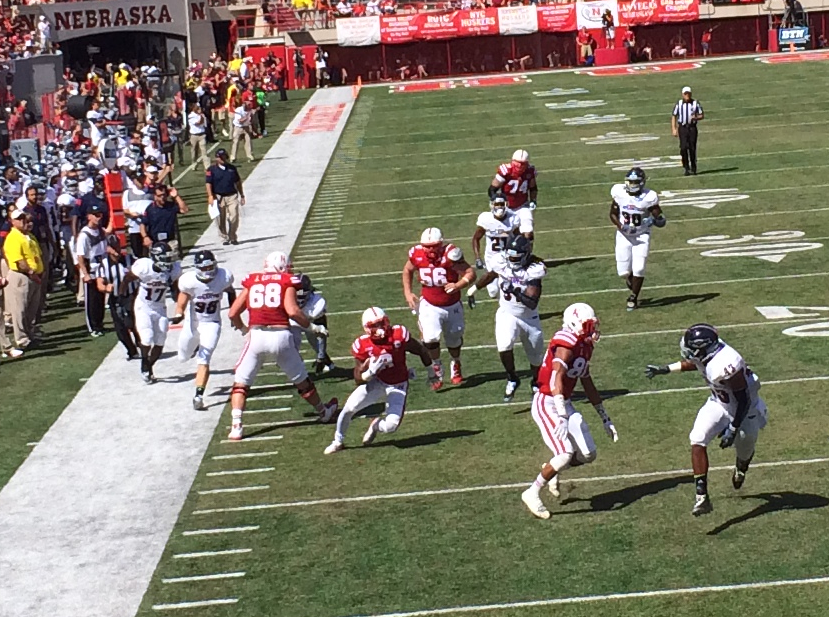
Ameer Abdullah running at Memorial Stadium on August 30, 2014

Sporting News listed Abdullah among their top 10 candidates for the Heisman trophy in 2014 and they listed Abdullah as the number 4 returning running back.

In late September 2014, Eric Galko and Ian Wharton of Sporting News analyzed his running attributes. They concluded that even though his 40-yard time is not below 4.4 second and he does not possess the most power when running, he is a complete running back. He runs very low, below the pad level of defenders, making him very difficult to tackle. Abdullah has great balance, vision to find holes and the patience to wait for his blockers to those open holes. These running characteristics together with his burst, shiftiness in space, and ability to keep his legs moving when hit, make him "the most well-rounded tailback in the country".

In early September 2014, Nebraska sent out AA batteries to members of the sports news media and created a website for Abdullah to promote his Heisman campaign. Abdullah and 2013 Heisman Trophy winner Jameis Winston trained together at the same gym in Birmingham, Alabama. In December 2014, Abdullah received the Senior CLASS Award for the most outstanding senior college football player in Division I based on classroom performance, community contributions, personal character, and athletic achievements. Players were selected based on votes from FBS football coaches, media, and fans.

Abdullah ran for a career-high 232 rushing yards on 21 carries for an average of 11 yards per carry in a 55–7 win over Florida Atlantic. His longest run was 47 yards for a touchdown. He also caught one pass for 9 yards. On September 1, he won Big Ten offensive player of the week.

Abdullah ran for 67 yards on 17 carries for an average of 3.2 yards per carry in a 31–24 win over the McNeese State Cowboys. His longest run was for 19 yards. He caught 3 passes for 96 yards and his 58-yard run after his last catch with 20 seconds left in the game put Nebraska up by a touchdown and was the game-winning score. Abdullah ran for 110 yards on 19 carries for an average of 5.8 yards per carry in a 55–19 win over the Fresno State Bulldogs. During the first quarter, he had a 57-yard rushing touchdown.

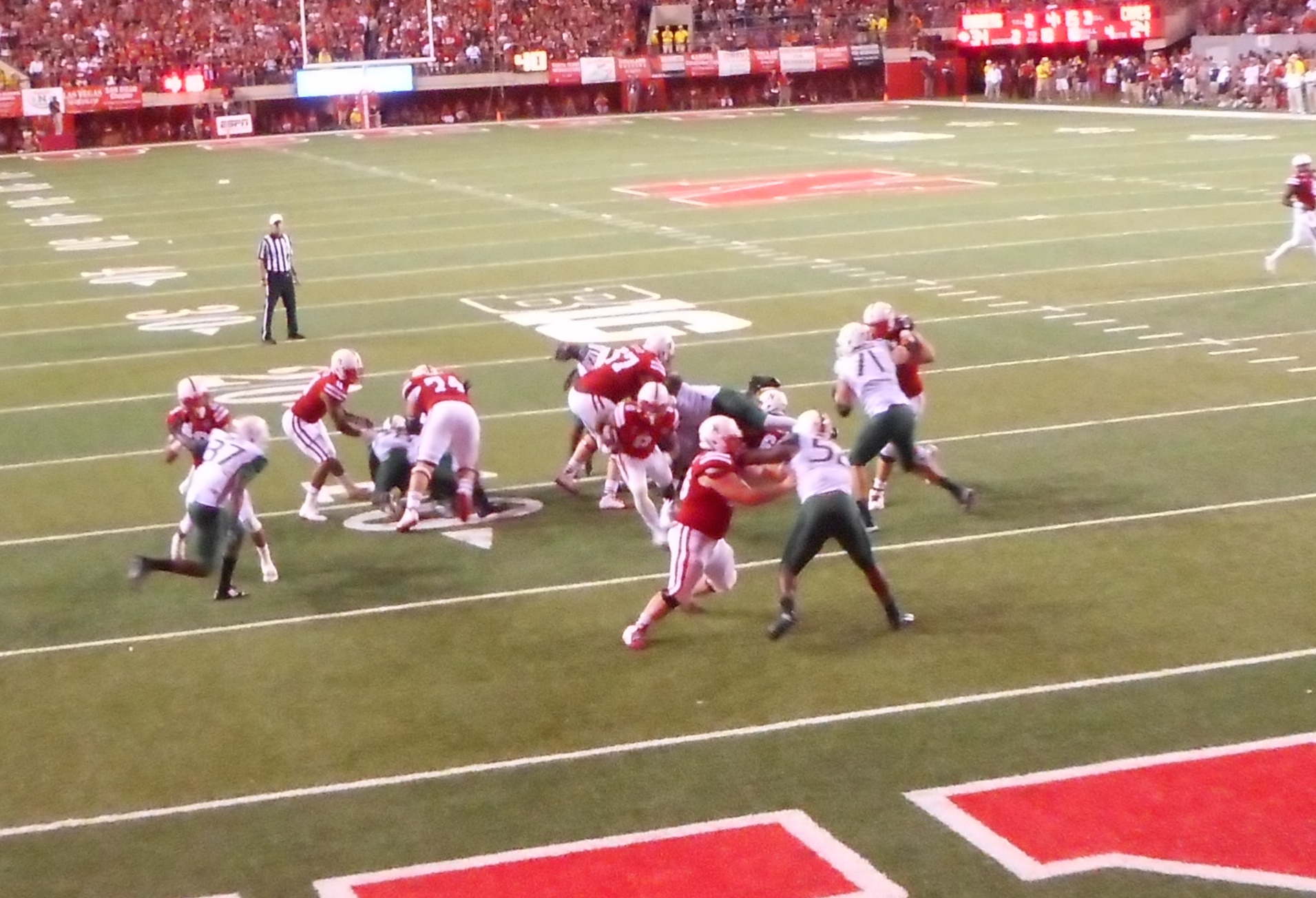
Ameer Abdullah running for a touchdown in the fourth quarter during the Nebraska against Miami on September 9, 2014.

Abdullah ran for 229 yards on 35 carries for an average of 6.5 yards per carry with two touchdowns in a 41–31 win over the Miami Hurricanes. His 35 carries were a career-high and his last touchdown sealed the win. His longest run was 26 yards and he caught one pass for three yards and a touchdown. Abdullah also had 313 all-purpose yards, which broke Nebraska's 1972 Heisman Trophy winner Johnny Rodgers's record of 5,586 career all-purpose yards. Abdullah's career total reached 5,762 yards. On September 22, 2014, Abdullah was Big Ten co-offensive player for week four, sharing honors with Melvin Gordon.

Abdullah ran for 208 yards on 22 carries for an average of 9.5 yards per carry with three touchdowns in a 45–14 win over the Illinois Fighting Illini. He rushed for 196 yards by halftime. His longest run was for 28 yards and he had four runs of 20 yards or more before halftime. On September 29, 2014, Abdullah was named Big Ten player offensive player of the week. Abdullah was held to 45 yards rushing on 24 attempts for an average of 1.9 yards per carry and two touchdowns in a 27–22 loss to the Michigan State Spartans. He also had two pass receptions for 22 yards.

Abdullah ran for 146 yards on 23 carries for an average of 6.3 yards per carry with four touchdowns in a 38–17 win over the Northwestern Wildcats. He was held to 39 yards at halftime, but rushed for 107 yards in the second half including a 50-yard rush at the beginning of the fourth quarter that set up his third touchdown. He also had 4 pass receptions for 13 yards.

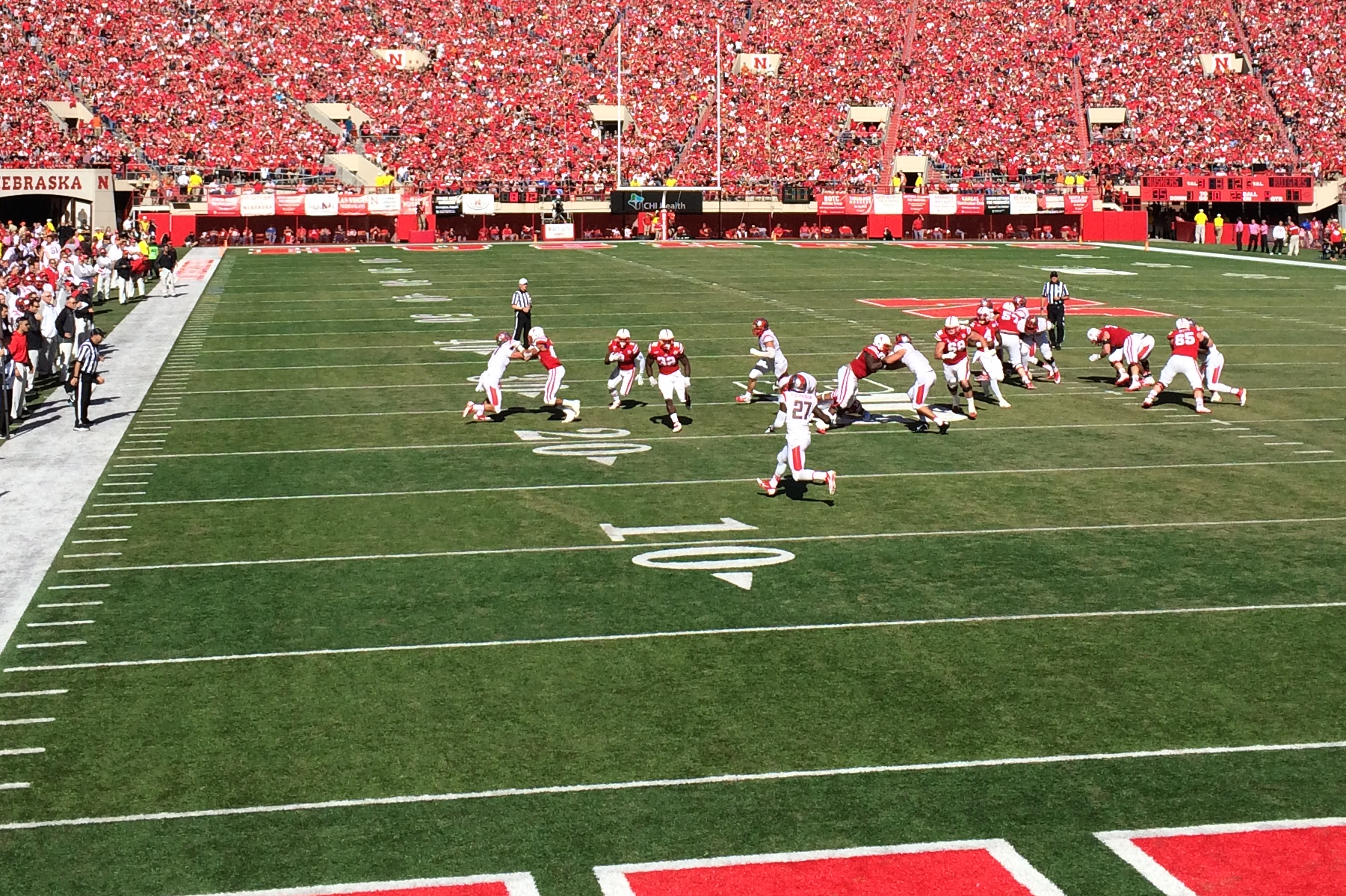
Abdullah turning the corner on his third touchdown run.

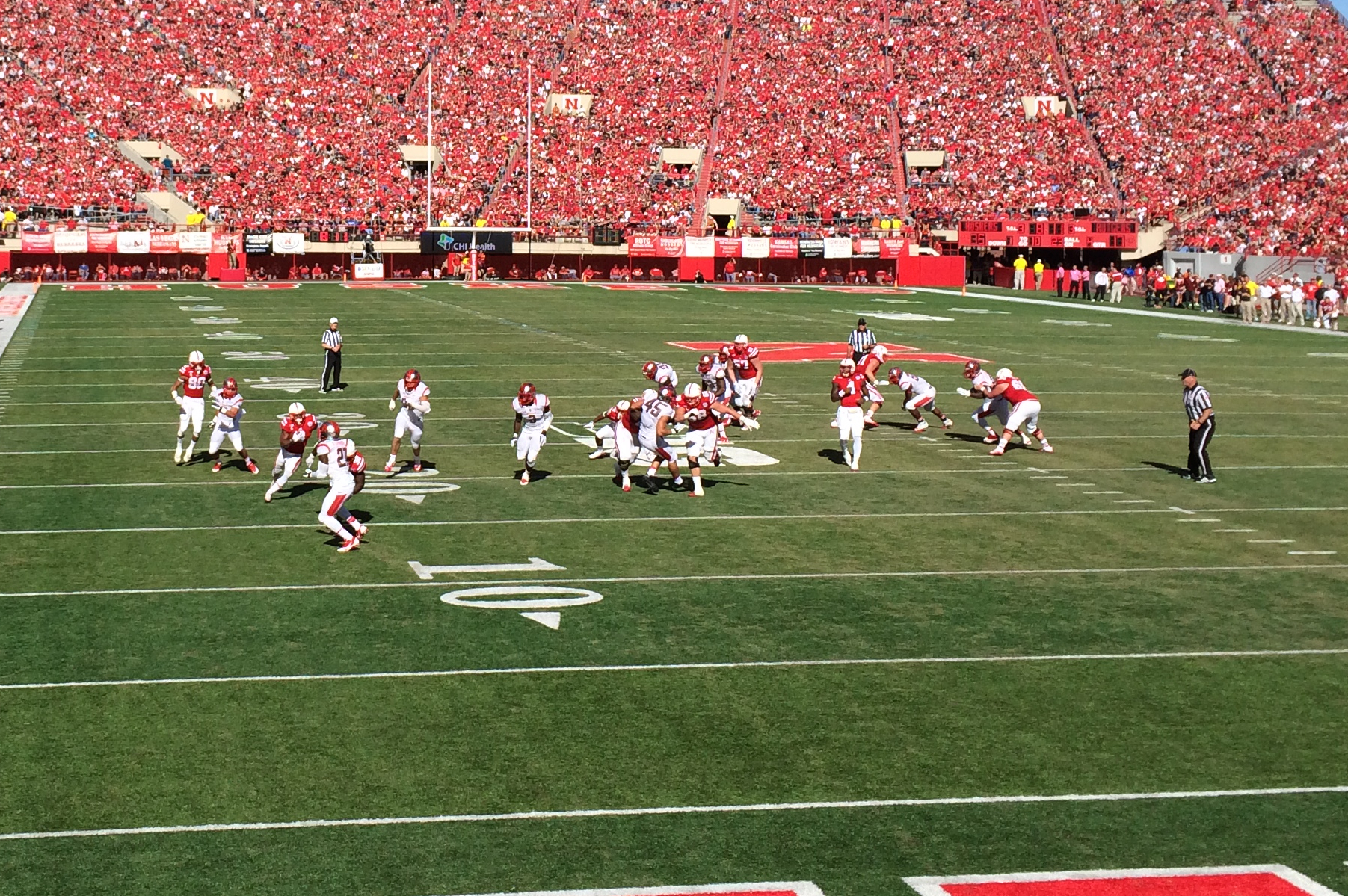
Abdullah crossing the 20 yard line.

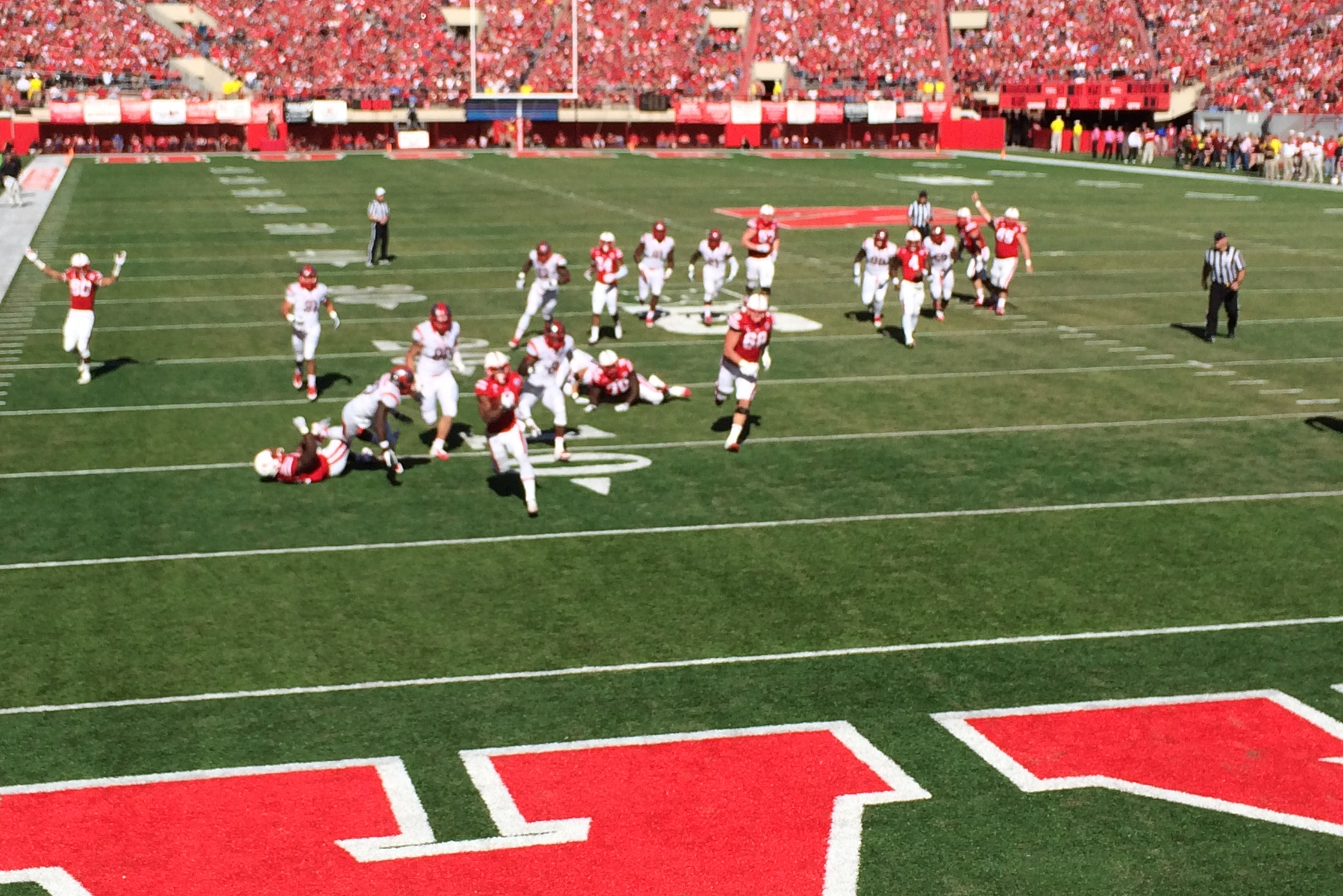
Abdullah heading to the end zone for his third touchdown.

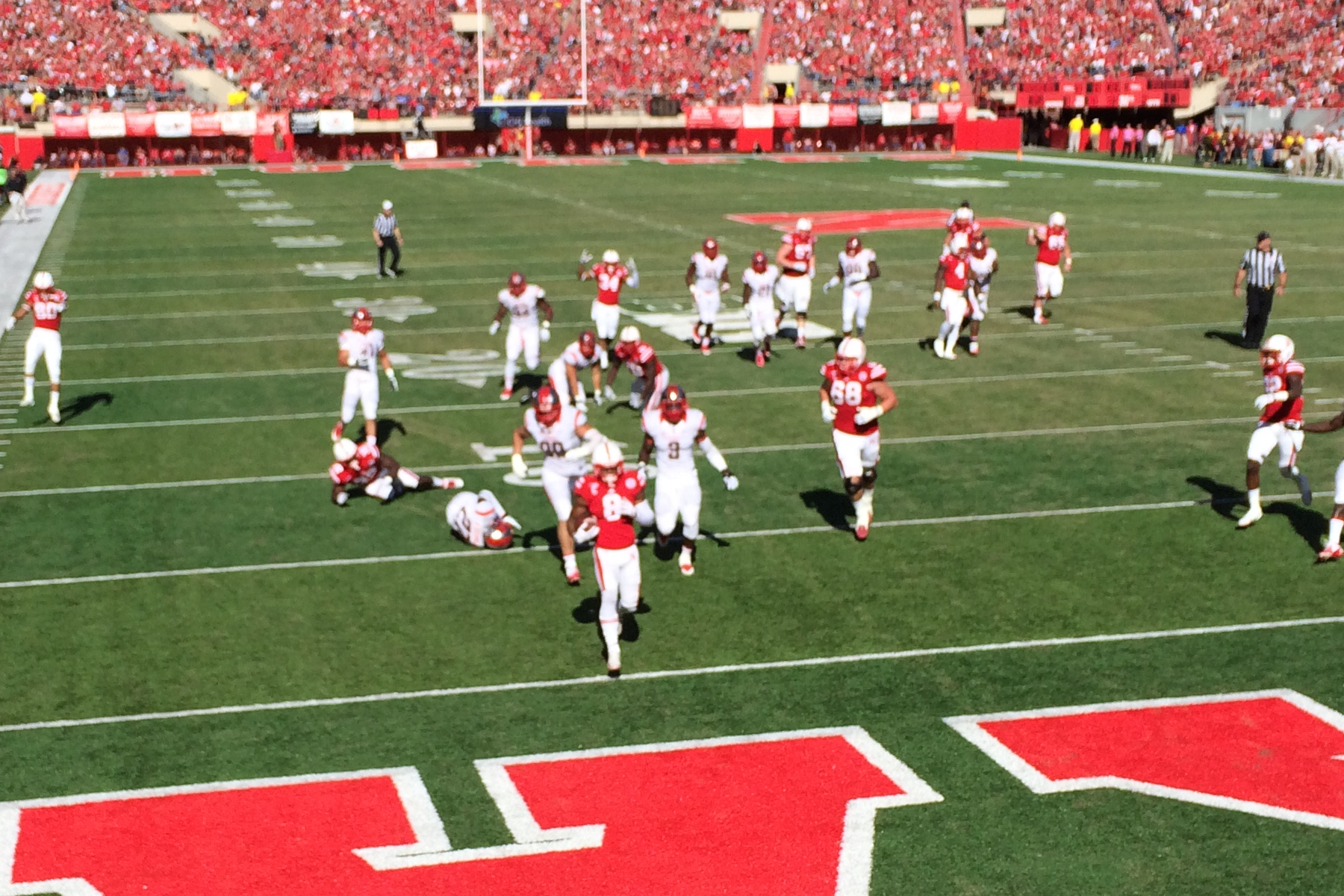
Abdullah crosses the goal line.

Abdullah ran for 225 yards on 19 carries for an average of 11.8 yards per carry with four touchdowns in a 42–24 win over the Rutgers Scarlet Knights. In the first half, Abdullah had runs of 53 and 48 yards for touchdowns on two consecutive series. In the second half, he ran for 49 yards on the first play of the half and Tommy Armstrong Jr. subsequently threw a touchdown pass for a touchdown. In the fourth quarter, Abdullah ran 23 yards for his third touchdown of the game. He also caught two passes for 26 yards and he returned two kickoffs for 90 yards. His 341 all-purpose yards set a new record for all-purpose yards at Nebraska.

On Monday, October 27, Abdullah was named Big 10 offensive player of the week for the fourth time in the 2014 season. He named to the Paul Hornung Award honor roll for the third time during the 2014 season. He was also named Week 9 player of the week by Athlon Sports.

Abdullah ran for only one yard on six carries before he was injured in the first quarter in a 35–14 win over the Purdue Boilermakers. Pelini told reporters after the game that Abdullah had suffered a "mild" MCL sprain and bruise when he tried to recover a fumbled snap by the quarter back on a fourth down at the Purdue one-yard line. When asked, Pelini said that he was optimistic that Abdullah would be ready to play the Wisconsin Badgers on November 15, but he added he couldn't say for sure whether he would be able to play.

In the game against Wisconsin, Abdullah had 69 rushing yards and a 26-yard reception in 59–24 loss. On November 22, against Minnesota, Abdullah had 98 rushing yards and a touchdown in the 28–24 loss. In the final game of the regular season against Iowa, Abdullah had 13 carries for 106 yards to go along with two receptions for 13 yards and a receiving touchdown in the 37–34 overtime victory. In the Holiday Bowl against Southern California, Abdullah had 88 rushing yards, one rushing touchdown, six receptions, and 61 receiving yards in the 45–42 loss in his final collegiate game. Abdullah finished his career with 4,588 career rushing yards, trailing only Mike Rozier’s NU record of 4,780 career rushing yards.

== Professional career ==
Pre-draft measurables
Height	Weight	Arm length	Hand span	Wingspan	40-yard dash	10-yard split	20-yard split	20-yard shuttle	Three-cone drill	Vertical jump	Broad jump	Bench press
5 ft 8 3/4 in (1.75 m)	205 lb (93 kg)	30 in (0.76 m)	8 5/8 in (0.22 m)	6 ft 0 in (1.83 m)	4.55 s	1.48 s	2.63 s	3.95 s	6.79 s	42.5 in (1.08 m)	10 ft 10 in (3.30 m)	24 reps
All values from NFL Combine/Pro Day

=== Detroit Lions ===
==== 2015 season ====
Abdullah was drafted in the second round with the 54th overall pick by the Detroit Lions in the 2015 NFL draft. He was the fourth running back to be selected that year. On May 14, 2015, the Lions signed Abdullah to a four-year, $4.15 million contract with $1.85 million guaranteed and a signing bonus of $1.28 million.

Abdullah began his rookie season as the Lions' third running back on their depth chart behind veterans Joique Bell and Theo Riddick. He made his professional regular season debut in the Lion's season opener against the San Diego Chargers, finishing with seven carries for 50 rushing yards and four catches for 44 receiving yards. He scored his first career touchdown on a 24-yard rushing touchdown in the first quarter of the 28–33 loss to the Chargers. The following week, he had his first career start against the Minnesota Vikings and finished the 16–26 loss with six carries for nine yards. On September 27, 2015, Abdullah had eight rushing attempts for 23 rushing yards and made two catches to 19 receiving yards and a touchdown in a 12–24 loss to the Denver Broncos. He caught his first career touchdown reception on a 16-yard pass from Matt Stafford. In Week 12, he made his second career start and rushed for 63 yards on a season-high 16 carries, while also making one reception for 12 yards against the Philadelphia Eagles. He remained the starting running back for the rest of the season. On December 21, 2015, Abdullah had nine carries for a season-high 77 rushing yards and scored his second rushing touchdown of the season against the New Orleans Saints. He finished his rookie season with a total of 143 carries, 597 rushing yards, two rushing touchdowns, 25 receptions, 183 receiving yards, and one receiving touchdown while starting nine games and playing in all 16 games. Abdullah was awarded the Lions 2015 Rookie of the Year Award by members of Detroit Sports Media.

==== 2016 season ====
He began his second season as the Detroit Lions' starting running back for the beginning of the regular season. In the season-opener against the Indianapolis Colts, Abdullah had 12 carries for 63 rushing yards and caught five passes for 57 receiving yards and a touchdown as the Lions defeated the Colts 39–35. On September 18, 2016, he had six rushing attempts for 38 rushing yards against the Tennessee Titans before suffering an injury to his foot and leaving the game. He had torn a ligament in his left foot and missed the remainder of the season. On September 21, 2016, the Lions placed Abdullah on injured reserve.

==== 2017 season ====
On September 18, 2017, against the New York Giants on Monday Night Football, Abdullah had 17 carries for a then career-high 86 yards in the 24–10 victory. In Week 4, against the Vikings, he had a career-high 94 rushing yards and a touchdown in the 14–7 victory. In Weeks 9–10, he scored a touchdown in consecutive games against the Green Bay Packers and Cleveland Browns. In the next game against the Chicago Bears, he had a receiving touchdown in the 27–24 victory. Overall, he finished the 2017 season with 552 rushing yards, four rushing touchdowns, 25 receptions, 162 receiving yards, and one receiving touchdown.

==== 2018 season ====
Abdullah entered the 2018 season second on the depth chart behind veteran LeGarrette Blount. He was quickly passed by rookie Kerryon Johnson as the starter. He played in three games primarily on special teams before ultimately being waived by the team on November 6, 2018.

=== Minnesota Vikings ===
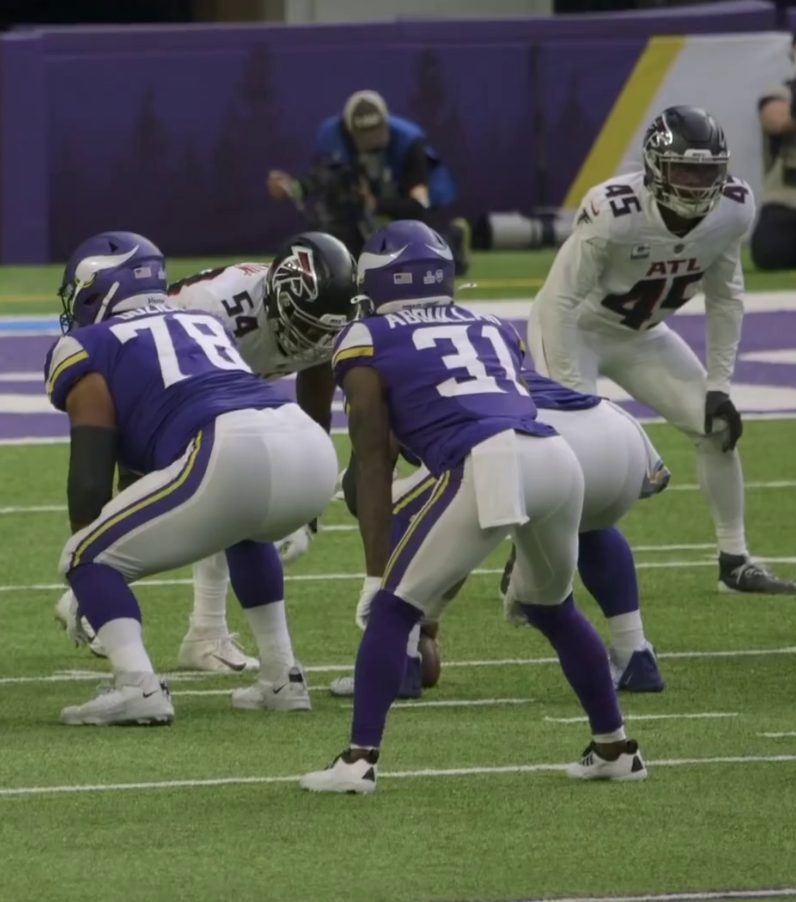
Abdullah (31) with the Vikings in 2020

On November 7, 2018, Abdullah was claimed off waivers by the Minnesota Vikings. His role in the 2018 season with mainly kick return duties.

On March 18, 2019, Abdullah was re-signed by the Vikings. In the 2019 season, Abdullah appeared in 16 games and recorded 23 carries for 115 rushing yards to go along with 15 receptions for 88 receiving yards and one receiving touchdown.

On March 27, 2020, Abdullah was re-signed by the Vikings. In the 2020 season, Abdullah finished with 100 total scrimmage yards and two receiving touchdowns.

He was released on August 31, 2021, and re-signed to the practice squad the next day. He was promoted to the active roster on September 18, 2021. He was three days later and re-signed to the practice squad. He was promoted back to the active roster on September 25. He was released on October 19.

=== Carolina Panthers ===
On October 23, 2021, Abdullah signed with the Carolina Panthers. Abdullah finished the 2021 season with 51 carries for 166 rushing yards to go along with 38 receptions for 289 receiving yards and one receiving touchdown.

=== Las Vegas Raiders ===
Abdullah signed with the Las Vegas Raiders on March 18, 2022. In the 2022 season, he appeared in 17 games and had 25 receptions for 211 yards and a receiving touchdown to go with some kickoff return duties. He re-signed with the team on March 9, 2023. In the 2023 season, he appeared in 17 games. He contributed in the rushing and receiving game while having a role on special teams.

On March 8, 2024, Abdullah re-signed with the Raiders. In the 2024 season, he finished with 66 carries for 311 rushing yards and two rushing touchdowns to go with 40 receptions for 261 receiving yards and three receiving touchdowns.

=== San Francisco 49ers ===
On July 31, 2025, Abdullah signed with the San Francisco 49ers. On August 11, Abdullah was placed on injured reserve; he was subsequently waived on August 19.

=== Indianapolis Colts ===
On September 8, 2025, Abdullah was signed to the Indianapolis Colts' practice squad. He was promoted to the team's active roster on October 18, amid an injury to backup Tyler Goodson. He finished the 2025 season with 14 carries for 60 rushing yards and a rushing touchdown to go with 16 receptions for 99 receiving yards in 13 games.

=== Jacksonville Jaguars ===
On May 11, 2026, Abdullah signed with Jacksonville Jaguars. On October 11, in the Jaguars' week 5 matchup against the Philadelphia Eagles, Abdullah had a 53-yard kickoff return, setting up a 57–yard field goal for Cam Little as the Jaguars won 19-17.

== Career statistics ==
=== NFL ===
Legend
	Led the league
**Bold**	Career high

==== Regular season ====
Year	Team	Games		Rushing					Receiving					Kick returns				
Year	Team	GP	GS	Att	Yds	Avg	Lng	TD	Rec	Yds	Avg	Lng	TD	Ret	Yds	Avg	Lng	TD
2015	DET	16	9	143	**597**	4.2	36	2	25	183	7.3	**36**	1	**37**	**1,077**	29.1	**104**	0
2016	DET	2	2	18	101	5.6	24	0	5	57	**11.4**	18	1	0	–	–	–	–
2017	DET	14	**11**	**165**	552	3.3	34	**4**	25	162	6.5	22	1	8	179	22.4	29	0
2018	DET	3	0	1	1	1.0	1	0	2	18	9.0	12	0	4	107	26.8	33	0
2018	MIN	7	0	0	–	–	–	–	1	10	10.0	10	0	10	258	25.8	33	0
2019	MIN	16	0	23	115	5.0	15	0	15	88	5.9	16	1	13	325	25.0	38	0
2020	MIN	16	0	8	42	5.3	13	0	8	58	7.3	22	2	15	352	23.5	33	0
2021	MIN	**6**	0	7	30	4.3	9	0	3	**17**	5.7	10	0	7	162	23.1	45	0
2021	CAR	**11**	1	44	136	3.1	15	0	35	**272**	7.8	23	1	22	484	22.0	39	0
2022	LV	**17**	0	4	20	5.0	7	0	25	211	8.4	23	1	26	543	20.9	33	0
2023	LV	**17**	0	15	89	**5.9**	12	0	19	131	6.9	18	0	0	–	–	–	–
2024	LV	16	3	66	311	4.7	**40**	2	**40**	261	6.5	24	**3**	9	296	**32.9**	68	0
2025	IND	13	0	14	60	4.3	14	1	16	99	6.2	15	0	19	563	29.6	81	0
2026	JAX	9	0	23	88	3.8	12	0	2	2	1.0	2	0	15	430	28.7	53	0
Career		163	26	531	2,142	4.0	40	9	221	1,569	7.1	36	11	185	4,776	25.8	104	0

==== Postseason ====
Year	Team	Games		Rushing					Receiving					Kick returns				
Year	Team	GP	GS	Att	Yds	Avg	Lng	TD	Rec	Yds	Avg	Lng	TD	Ret	Yds	Avg	Lng	TD
2016	DET	0	0	Did not play due to injury														
2019	MIN	2	0	1	9	9.0	9	0	1	7	7.0	7	0	6	151	25.2	39	0
Career		2	0	1	9	9.0	9	0	1	7	7.0	7	0	6	151	25.2	39	0

=== College ===
Rushing and receiving statistics by year.

	Rushing					Receiving				
Year	Att	Yds	Avg	Lng	TD	Rec	Yds	Avg	Lng	TD
2011	42	150	3.6	24	3	1	11	11	11	0
2012	226	1,137	5.0	45	8	24	178	7.4	26	2
2013	281	1,690	6.0	62	9	26	232	8.9	40	2
2014	264	1,611	6.1	57	19	22	269	12.2	58	3
Career	813	4,588	5.6	62	39	73	690	9.5	58	7

Punt, kick return, and all-purpose yardage statistics by year.

	Punt returns				Kick returns				All-purpose			
Year	Att	Yds	Avg	TD	Att	Yds	Avg	TD	Att	Yds	Ave	TD
2011	15	107	7.1	0	26	763	29.3	1	84	1,031	12.3	4
2012	16	209	13.1	1	17	360	21.2	0	283	1,904	6.7	11
2013	0	0	–	0	4	77	19.3	0	311	1,999	6.4	11
2014	0	0	–	0	11	272	24.7	0	297	2,152	7.2	22
Career	31	316	10.2	1	59	1,492	24.9	1	975	7,086	7.3	48

== Personal life ==
Abdullah was born on June 13, 1993, in Homewood, Alabama. He is the son of Kareem and Aisha Abdullah, and the youngest of nine children. He was a History major in college. His father, Kareem, is an imam and serves as a religious advisor to his son.

Abdullah is Muslim. He prays five times a day and fasts during Ramadan, including during football season. Abdullah has stated that fasting during Ramadan helps his performance, stating that "It gives a lot of Muslim athletes an opportunity to focus on your mental toughness and discipline...At the close of Ramadan it's always good for me because I'm at my best state mentally. This year [2017], it's great that it's during OTAs (organized team activities) and ends right before training camp because it allows me to go into camp mentally strong and with a clear mind."
