= 2014 Nebraska Cornhuskers football team =

American college football season

2014 Nebraska Cornhuskers football

Holiday Bowl vs. USC, L 42–45
- Conference: Big Ten Conference
- West Division
- Record: 9–4 (5–3 Big Ten)
- Head coach: Bo Pelini (7th season; regular season); Barney Cotton (interim; bowl game)
- Offensive coordinator: Tim Beck (4th season)
- Offensive scheme: Spread
- Defensive coordinator: John Papuchis (3rd season)
- Base defense: 4–3
- Home stadium: Memorial Stadium

2014 Big Ten Conference football standings
	Conf.			Overall
Team	W		L	W		L
East Division
No. 1 Ohio State x$#^	8	–	0	14	–	1
No. T–5 Michigan State	7	–	1	11	–	2
Maryland	4	–	4	7	–	6
Rutgers	3	–	5	8	–	5
Michigan	3	–	5	5	–	7
Penn State	2	–	6	7	–	6
Indiana	1	–	7	4	–	8
West Division
No. 13 Wisconsin x	7	–	1	11	–	3
Minnesota	5	–	3	8	–	5
Nebraska	5	–	3	9	–	4
Iowa	4	–	4	7	–	6
Illinois	3	–	5	6	–	7
Northwestern	3	–	5	5	–	7
Purdue	1	–	7	3	–	9
Championship: Ohio State 59, Wisconsin 0
# – College Football Playoff champion; ^ – College Football Playoff participant; $ – Conference champion; x – Division champion/co-champions; Rankings from AP Poll

The 2014 Nebraska Cornhuskers football team represented the University of Nebraska in the 2014 NCAA Division I FBS football season. The team was coached by Bo Pelini and played their home games at Memorial Stadium in Lincoln, Nebraska. They were members of the West Division of the Big Ten Conference. They finished the season 9–4, 5–3 in Big Ten play to finish in a tie for second place in the West Division. Following losses to both Wisconsin and Minnesota and a come from behind win in overtime at Iowa, Pelini was relieved of his coaching duties following the conclusion of the regular season on November 30, 2014. On December 4, 2014, Mike Riley was announced as the next head coach of the Nebraska football team, and would begin his duties immediately. However, he would not coach the Huskers in the Holiday Bowl, with that job instead handled by Barney Cotton. The Cornhuskers lost the Holiday Bowl to USC.

== Before the season ==
=== Recruiting ===
==== Scholarship recruits ====
College recruiting
Name	Hometown	School	Height	Weight	40^{‡}	Commit date
Akinmoladun, Freedom; TE	Grandview, MO	Grandview	6 ft 4 in (1.93 m)	240 lb (110 kg)	4.7	Jul 4, 2013
Akinmoladun, Freedom; TE	Recruit ratings: Scout: Rivals: 247Sports: ESPN: (82)					
Brown, Drew; PK	Southlake, TX	Carroll	5 ft 10 in (1.78 m)	170 lb (77 kg)	N/A	Jun 7, 2013
Brown, Drew; PK	Recruit ratings: Scout: Rivals: 247Sports: ESPN: (77)					
Bush, AJ; QB	Norcross, GA	Norcross	6 ft 4 in (1.93 m)	214 lb (97 kg)	4.6	Feb 2, 2014
Bush, AJ; QB	Recruit ratings: Scout: Rivals: 247Sports: ESPN: (74)					
Cockrell, Byerson; DB	Scooba, MS	East Mississippi CC	6 ft 2 in (1.88 m)	185 lb (84 kg)	N/A	Dec 6, 2013
Cockrell, Byerson; DB	Recruit ratings: Scout: Rivals: 247Sports: ESPN: (73)					
Darlington, Zack; QB	Apopka, FL	Apopka	6 ft 1 in (1.85 m)	210 lb (95 kg)	N/A	Jun 14, 2013
Darlington, Zack; QB	Recruit ratings: Scout: Rivals: 247Sports: ESPN: (80)					
Farmer, Tanner; OL	Highland, IL	Highland	6 ft 4 in (1.93 m)	315 lb (143 kg)	5.2	Jun 11, 2013
Farmer, Tanner; OL	Recruit ratings: Scout: Rivals: 247Sports: ESPN: (80)					
Foster, D.J. OL	Lincoln, NE	Southeast	6 ft 3 in (1.91 m)	312 lb (142 kg)	5.4	Jun 15, 2013
Foster, D.J. OL	Recruit ratings: Scout: Rivals: 247Sports: ESPN: (82)					
Gates, Nick; OL	Las Vegas, NV	Bishop Gorman	6 ft 4 in (1.93 m)	272 lb (123 kg)	N/A	Jan 24, 2014
Gates, Nick; OL	Recruit ratings: Scout: Rivals: 247Sports: ESPN: (77)					
Gifford, Luke; ATH	Lincoln NE	Southeast	6 ft 3 in (1.91 m)	198 lb (90 kg)	N/A	Mar 11, 2013
Gifford, Luke; ATH	Recruit ratings: Scout: Rivals: 247Sports: ESPN: (78)					
Harrison, Monte; WR	Lee's Summit, MO	Lee's Summit West	6 ft 3 in (1.91 m)	200 lb (91 kg)	4.5	Jul 4, 2013
Harrison, Monte; WR	Recruit ratings: Scout: Rivals: 247Sports: ESPN: (81)					
Irons, Glenn; WR	New Orleans, LA	Edna Karr	5 ft 10 in (1.78 m)	170 lb (77 kg)	N/A	Jan 25, 2014
Irons, Glenn; WR	Recruit ratings: Scout: Rivals: 247Sports: ESPN: (71)					
Jones, Chris; DB	Jacksonville, FL	Sandalwood	6 ft 0 in (1.83 m)	175 lb (79 kg)	N/A	Jan 20, 2014
Jones, Chris; DB	Recruit ratings: Scout: Rivals: 247Sports: ESPN: (70)					
Kalu, Joshua; DB	Houston, TX	Alief Taylor	6 ft 1 in (1.85 m)	169 lb (77 kg)	N/A	Oct 14, 2013
Kalu, Joshua; DB	Recruit ratings: Scout: Rivals: 247Sports: ESPN: (78)					
Keels, Joe; DE	Highland, KS	Highland CC	6 ft 4 in (1.93 m)	280 lb (130 kg)	4.8	Dec 10, 2013
Keels, Joe; DE	Recruit ratings: Scout: Rivals: 247Sports: ESPN: (78)					
King, Sedrick; DE	Plant City, FL	Plant City	6 ft 4 in (1.93 m)	230 lb (100 kg)	N/A	Jan 27, 2014
King, Sedrick; DE	Recruit ratings: Scout: Rivals: 247Sports: ESPN: (70)					
Mosley, Trai; DB	Pflugerville, TX	Hendrickson	5 ft 10 in (1.78 m)	171 lb (78 kg)	4.4	Jun 14, 2013
Mosley, Trai; DB	Recruit ratings: Scout: Rivals: 247Sports: ESPN: (78)					
Newell, Peyton; DE	Hiawatha, KS	Hiawatha	6 ft 3 in (1.91 m)	285 lb (129 kg)	4.9	Aug 30, 2013
Newell, Peyton; DE	Recruit ratings: Scout: Rivals: 247Sports: ESPN: (78)					
Pierson-El, Demornay; WR	Alexandria, VA	West Potomac	5 ft 9 in (1.75 m)	174 lb (79 kg)	4.5	Jun 15, 2013
Pierson-El, Demornay; WR	Recruit ratings: Scout: Rivals: 247Sports: ESPN: (78)					
Stewart, Larenzo; RB	Klein, TX	Klein Oak	5 ft 6 in (1.68 m)	165 lb (75 kg)	4.4	Jul 5, 2013
Stewart, Larenzo; RB	Recruit ratings: Scout: Rivals: 247Sports: ESPN: (77)					
Stoltenberg, Mick; OL	Gretna, NE	Gretna	6 ft 5 in (1.96 m)	250 lb (110 kg)	4.8	Jun 15, 2013
Stoltenberg, Mick; OL	Recruit ratings: Scout: Rivals: 247Sports: ESPN: (75)					
Tolbert, Jariah; WR	New Orleans, LA	Edna Karr	6 ft 3 in (1.91 m)	185 lb (84 kg)	N/A	Jan 9, 2014
Tolbert, Jariah; WR	Recruit ratings: Scout: Rivals: 247Sports: ESPN: (77)					
Walton, Jaevon; ATH	New Orleans, LA	Edna Karr	6 ft 0 in (1.83 m)	236 lb (107 kg)	N/A	Nov 16, 2013
Walton, Jaevon; ATH	Recruit ratings: Scout: Rivals: 247Sports: ESPN: (72)					
Wilbon, Mikale; RB	Chicago, IL	De La Salle	5 ft 8 in (1.73 m)	191 lb (87 kg)	N/A	Jan 26, 2014
Wilbon, Mikale; RB	Recruit ratings: Scout: Rivals: 247Sports: ESPN: (76)					
Wills, Deandre; DE	Lineville, AL	Central of Clay County	6 ft 3 in (1.91 m)	250 lb (110 kg)	N/A	Feb 2, 2014
Wills, Deandre; DE	Recruit ratings: Scout: Rivals: 247Sports: (N/A)					
Overall recruit ranking: Scout: 34 Rivals: 32 ESPN: 39
‡ Refers to 40-yard dash; Note: In many cases, Scout, Rivals, 247Sports, On3, and ESPN may conflict in their listings of height, weight and 40 time.; In these cases, the average was taken. ESPN grades are on a 100-point scale.; Sources: "Yahoo Sports: Rivals.com 2014 Nebraska Commitments". Rivals.; "Scout.com 2014 Nebraska Commitments". Scout.; "ESPN 2014 Nebraska Commitments". ESPN.; "Scout.com Team Recruiting Rankings". Scout.; "2014 Team Ranking". Rivals.com.

==== Walk-on recruits ====
College recruiting
Name	Hometown	School	Height	Weight	40^{‡}	Commit date
Arneson, Noah; DT	Omaha, NE	Omaha Gross	6 ft 3 in (1.91 m)	300 lb (140 kg)	N/A	
Arneson, Noah; DT	Recruit ratings: No ratings found					
Boryca, Alex; LB	Cozad, NE	Cozad	6 ft 2 in (1.88 m)	220 lb (100 kg)	N/A	
Boryca, Alex; LB	Recruit ratings: No ratings found					
Conrad, Cole; OL	Fremont, NE	Fremont Bergan	6 ft 5 in (1.96 m)	280 lb (130 kg)	N/A	
Conrad, Cole; OL	Recruit ratings: No ratings found					
Freudenberg, Ryan; OL	Norfolk, NE	Lutheran High Northeast	6 ft 5 in (1.96 m)	290 lb (130 kg)	N/A	
Freudenberg, Ryan; OL	Recruit ratings: No ratings found					
Graham, Nolan; DB	Firth, NE	Norris	5 ft 11 in (1.80 m)	195 lb (88 kg)	N/A	
Graham, Nolan; DB	Recruit ratings: No ratings found					
Holtmeier, Blake; WR	Kearney, NE	Kearney Catholic	6 ft 2 in (1.88 m)	190 lb (86 kg)	N/A	
Holtmeier, Blake; WR	Recruit ratings: No ratings found					
Jakub, Cameron; DB	Columbus, NE	Columbus	5 ft 11 in (1.80 m)	170 lb (77 kg)	N/A	
Jakub, Cameron; DB	Recruit ratings: No ratings found					
Jarzynka, Matt; DE	Loup City, NE	Loup City	6 ft 4 in (1.93 m)	220 lb (100 kg)	N/A	
Jarzynka, Matt; DE	Recruit ratings: No ratings found					
Kitrell, Bo; FB/LB	Ashland, NE	Ashland-Greenwood	6 ft 1 in (1.85 m)	210 lb (95 kg)	N/A	
Kitrell, Bo; FB/LB	Recruit ratings: No ratings found					
Koley, Creighton; DB	Omaha, NE	Omaha Skutt	6 ft 0 in (1.83 m)	185 lb (84 kg)	N/A	
Koley, Creighton; DB	Recruit ratings: No ratings found					
Meduna, Nate; TE	Wahoo, NE	Wahoo Neumann	6 ft 5 in (1.96 m)	220 lb (100 kg)	N/A	
Meduna, Nate; TE	Recruit ratings: No ratings found					
Ortmeier, Trent; OL	West Point, NE	Guardian Angels Central Catholic	6 ft 6 in (1.98 m)	270 lb (120 kg)	N/A	
Ortmeier, Trent; OL	Recruit ratings: No ratings found					
Owen, Dylan; DL	Westchester, NY	Bridgton Academy	6 ft 5 in (1.96 m)	240 lb (110 kg)	N/A	
Owen, Dylan; DL	Recruit ratings: No ratings found					
Pelzer, Brady; WR	Bellevue, NE	Bellevue East	5 ft 11 in (1.80 m)	170 lb (77 kg)	N/A	
Pelzer, Brady; WR	Recruit ratings: No ratings found					
Poppen, Garrett; LB	Giltner, NE	Giltner	6 ft 1 in (1.85 m)	215 lb (98 kg)	N/A	
Poppen, Garrett; LB	Recruit ratings: No ratings found					
Reimers, Bryan; TE	Lincoln, NE	Lincoln East	6 ft 5 in (1.96 m)	205 lb (93 kg)	N/A	
Reimers, Bryan; TE	Recruit ratings: No ratings found					
Rose, Austin; RB	Lincoln, NE	Lincoln North Star	6 ft 1 in (1.85 m)	220 lb (100 kg)	N/A	
Rose, Austin; RB	Recruit ratings: No ratings found					
Van Almen, Jack; LB	Rochester Hills, MI	Stoney Creek	6 ft 1 in (1.85 m)	215 lb (98 kg)	N/A	
Van Almen, Jack; LB	Recruit ratings: No ratings found					
Overall recruit ranking: Scout: 34 Rivals: 32 ESPN: 39
‡ Refers to 40-yard dash; Note: In many cases, Scout, Rivals, 247Sports, On3, and ESPN may conflict in their listings of height, weight and 40 time.; In these cases, the average was taken. ESPN grades are on a 100-point scale.; Sources: "Yahoo Sports: Rivals.com 2014 Nebraska Commitments". Rivals.; "Scout.com 2014 Nebraska Commitments". Scout.; "ESPN 2014 Nebraska Commitments". ESPN.; "Scout.com Team Recruiting Rankings". Scout.; "2014 Team Ranking". Rivals.com.

== Schedule ==
Date	Time	Opponent	Rank	Site	TV	Result	Attendance	Source
August 30	2:30 p.m.	Florida Atlantic*	No. 22	Memorial Stadium; Lincoln, NE	BTN	W 55–7	91,441	
September 6	11:00 a.m.	No. 7 (FCS) McNeese State*	No. 19	Memorial Stadium; Lincoln, NE	ESPNU	W 31–24	91,082	
September 13	9:30 p.m.	at Fresno State*		Bulldog Stadium; Fresno, CA	CBSSN	W 55–19	41,031	
September 20	7:00 p.m.	Miami (FL)*	No. 24	Memorial Stadium; Lincoln, NE (rivalry)	ESPN2	W 41–31	91,585	
September 27	8:00 p.m.	Illinois^{†}	No. 21	Memorial Stadium; Lincoln, NE	BTN	W 45–14	91,255	
October 4	7:00 p.m.	at No. 10 Michigan State	No. 19	Spartan Stadium; East Lansing, MI	ABC	L 22–27	75,923	
October 18	6:30 p.m.	at Northwestern	No. 19	Ryan Field; Evanston, IL	BTN	W 38–17	47,330	
October 25	11:00 a.m.	Rutgers	No. 16	Memorial Stadium; Lincoln, NE	ESPN2	W 42–24	91,088	
November 1	2:30 p.m.	Purdue	No. 15	Memorial Stadium; Lincoln, NE	ABC/ESPN2	W 35–14	91,107	
November 15	2:30 p.m.	at No. 20 Wisconsin	No. 16	Camp Randall Stadium; Madison, WI (Freedom Trophy)	ABC	L 24–59	80,539	
November 22	11:00 a.m.	No. 25 Minnesota	No. 23	Memorial Stadium; Lincoln, NE ($5 Bits of Broken Chair Trophy)	ESPN	L 24–28	91,186	
November 28	11:00 a.m.	at Iowa		Kinnick Stadium; Iowa City, IA (Heroes Game)	ABC	W 37–34 ^{OT}	66,897	
December 27	7:00 p.m.	vs. No. 24 USC*		Qualcomm Stadium; San Diego, CA (Holiday Bowl)	ESPN	L 42–45	55,789	
*Non-conference game; ^{†}Homecoming; Rankings from AP Poll and CFP Rankings after October 28 released prior to game; All times are in Central time; Source:

== Roster and coaching staff ==
2014 Nebraska Cornhuskers football team roster
Players
Coaches
Offense

Pos.	#	Name	Class
IB	8	Ameer Abdullah (C)	Sr
TE	88	Freedom Akinmoladun	Fr
WR	7	Taariq Allen	Jr
WR	43	Noah Appleget	Fr
QB	4	Tommy Armstrong Jr.	So
WR	33	Christian Bailey	RFr
WR	80	Kenny Bell (C)	Sr
TE	83	Jared Blum	So
QB	9	Tyson Broekemeier	Jr
WR	9	Sam Burtch (injured)	Jr
QB	6	AJ Bush	Fr
TE	11	Cethan Carter	So
OL	62	Cole Conrad	Fr
OL	68	Jake Cotton (C)	Sr
TE	84	Sam Cotton	So
IB	32	Imani Cross	Jr
QB	2	Zack Darlington	Fr
OL	63	Tanner Farmer	Fr
OL	59	Matt Finnin	Jr
OL	67	Jerald Foster	Fr
TE	42	Trey Foster	So
OL	51	Ryan Freudenburg	Fr
QB	17	Ryker Fyfe	So
OL	69	Nick Gates	Fr
WR	81	Kevin Gladney	RFr
OL	73	Sam Hahn	So
OL	72	Zach Hannon	RFr
TE	85	Greg Hart	RFr
WR	25	Blake Holtmeier	Fr
WR	13	Lane Hovey	So
WR	18	Glenn Irons	Fr
FB	35	Andy Janovich	Jr
OL	76	Dwayne Johnson Jr.	RFr
FB	38	Harrison Jordan	RFr
TE	89	Connor Ketter	RFr
FB	30	Bo Kitrell	Fr
OL	77	David Knevel	RFr
OL	70	Chongo Kondolo	Jr
IB	24	Murat Kuzu	Jr
OL	71	Alex Lewis	Jr
OL	75	Chris Long	Jr
FB	44	Mitch McCann	So
TE	41	Luke McNitt	So
TE	90	Nate Meduna	Fr
WR	82	Alonzo Moore	So
OL	74	Mike Moudy	Sr
IB	29	Graham Nabity	So
IB	39	Jordan Nelson	So
IB	34	Terrell Newby	So
OL	59	Trent Ortmeier	Fr
OL	54	Robby Painter	So
OL	56	Mark Pelini	Sr
WR	26	Brady Pelzer	Fr
WR	15	De'Mornay Pierson-El	Fr
OL	78	Givens Price	Jr
WR	48	Gabe Rahn	RFr
OL	65	Ryne Reeves	Jr
WR	87	Brandon Reilly	So
TE	45	Bryan Reimers	Fr
IB	23	Austin Rose	Fr
QB	5	Johnny Stanton	RFr
OL	57	Zach Sterup	Jr
TE	86	David Sutton	Jr
IB	28	Adam Taylor (injured)	RFr
OL	55	Paul Thurston	So
WR	19	Jariah Tolbert	Fr
WR	10	Jamal Turner (injured)	Sr
OL	66	Dylan Utter	So
WR	1	Jordan Westerkamp	So
OL	58	Corey Whitaker	So
IB	21	Mikale Wilbon	Fr

Defense

Pos.	#	Name	Class
S	2	LeRoy Alexander (S)	So
LB	13	Zaire Anderson	Sr
DL	61	Noah Arneson	Fr
LB	52	Josh Banderas	So
LB	53	Alex Boryca	Fr
DB	28	Byerson Cockrell	Jr
DT	7	Maliek Collins	So
LB	26	Thomas Connely	Fr
S	6	Corey Cooper (C)	Sr
CB	23	Daniel Davie	Jr
DE	88	Ross Dzuris	So
DE	49	Erik Evans	RFr
CB	31	Joey Felici	Sr
CB	30	Derek Foster	Sr
DE	95	Jack Gangwish	Jr
S	25	Nate Gerry	So
DB	12	Luke Gifford	Fr
DB	29	Nolan Graham	Fr
DE	4	Randy Gregory	Jr
DE	91	Tyler Hoppes	So
S	21	Charles Jackson (injured)	Jr
DB	39	Cameron Jakub	Fr
DE	47	Matt Jarzynka	Fr
DL	50	Garret Johns	So
DB	11	Chris Jones	Fr
DB	1	Boaz Joseph	RFr
DB	10	Joshua Kalu	Fr
DE	19	Joe Keels	Jr
DE	17	Sedrick King	Fr
DB	42	Creighton Koley	Fr
DL	58	Joel Lopez	So
LB	51	Courtney Love	RFr
DT	55	Kevin Maurice	So
LB	33	Garrett McKay	So
DE	90	Greg McMullen	So
CB	5	Josh Mitchell (C)	Sr
DB	16	Trai Mosley	Fr
DE	45	A.J. Natter	RFr
LB	3	Marcus Newby	RFr
DL	99	Peyton Newell	Fr
DL	76	Dylan Owen	Fr
LB	54	Garrett Poppen	Fr
DL	97	Logan Rath	So
DB	22	Anthony Ridder	Jr
LB	43	Trevor Roach	Sr
CB	14	Jonathan Rose	Jr
LB	15	Michael Rose-Ivey (injured)	So
LB	41	David Santos	Jr
LB	56	Brad Simpson	So
S	8	D.J. Singleton	RFr
DL	44	Mick Stoltenberg	Fr
S	36	Zach Stovall	RFr
DT	98	Vincent Valentine	So
LB	49	Chris Weber	RFr
LB	24	Austin Williams	Sr
DT	92	Kevin Williams	Jr
S	27	Kieron Williams	Fr

Special teams

Pos.	#	Name	Class
PK	37	Mauro Bondi	Jr
PK	34	Drew Brown	Fr
LS	92	Josh Faulkenberry	Fr
P	27	Sam Foltz	So
PK	95	Spencer Lindsay	So
LS	91	Gabriel Miller	So
PK	47	Grant Schumacher	RFr

Head coach

- Bo Pelini
  7th season
  8th year at Nebraska
  Alma mater: Ohio State

Coordinators/assistant coaches

- Tim Beck
  4th season as OC/QB coach
  7th year at Nebraska
  Alma mater: UCF
- John Papuchis
  3rd season as DC coach
  7th year at Nebraska
  Alma mater: Virginia Tech
- Ron Brown
  4th season as RB coach
  24th year at Nebraska
  Alma mater: Brown
- Barney Cotton
  2nd season as AHC/TE coach
  8th year at Nebraska
  Alma mater: Nebraska
- Ross Els
  4th season as LB coach
  4th year at Nebraska
  Alma mater: Nebraska-Omaha
- Rich Fisher
  4th season as WR coach
  4th year at Nebraska
  Alma mater: Colorado
- John Garrison
  2nd season as OL coach
  4th year at Nebraska
  Alma mater: Nebraska
- Rick Kaczenski
  3rd season as DL coach
  3rd year at Nebraska
  Alma mater: Notre Dame
- James Dobson
  7th season as S&C coach
  7th year at Nebraska
  Alma mater: Wisconsin
- Charlton Warren
  1st season as Sec coach
  1st year at Nebraska
  Alma mater: Air Force

Legend

- (C) Team captain
- (S) Suspended
- (I) Ineligible
- Injured
- Redshirt

Roster
Last update: August 25, 2014

=== Depth chart ===
Defense

FS
Corey Cooper
D.J Singelton
⋅

WILL	MIKE	BUCK
Zaire Anderson	Trevor Roach; Josh Banderas	David Santos
Courtney Love	⋅	Marcus Newby
⋅	⋅	⋅

SS
Nate Gerry
Kieron Williams
⋅

CB
Daniel Davie
Jonathan Rose
⋅

DE	DT	DT	DE
Randy Gregory	Vincent Valentine	Maliek Collins	Greg McMullen
Jack Gangwish	Kevin Williams	Kevin Maurice	A.J Natter; Joe Keels
⋅	⋅	⋅	⋅

CB
Josh Mitchell
Joshua Kalu
Byerson Cockrell
⋅

Offense

WR
Kenny Bell
Brandon Reilly
⋅

WR
De'Mornay Pierson-El
Alonzo Moore
Lane Hovey
⋅

LT	LG	C	RG	RT
Alex Lewis	Jake Cotton	Mark Pelini	Mike Moudy	Zach Sterup
David Kneval	Dylan Utter	Ryne Reeves	Chongo Kondolo	Givens Price; Matt Finnin
⋅	⋅	⋅	⋅	⋅

TE
Cethan Carter
Sam Cotton
Trey Foster

WR
Jordan Westerkamp
Taariq Allen
⋅

QB
Tommy Armstrong
Ryker Fyfe
Johnny Stanton

Key reserves
FB Andy Janovich
FB Harrison Jordan
Season-ending injury Number of games played ()
WR Jamal Turner (2)
WR Sam Burtch (0)
RB Adam Taylor (0)
LB Michael Rose-Ivey (0)
S LeRoy Alexander (0)
S Charles Jackson (0)

Special teams
PK Drew Brown
P Sam Foltz
KR Ameer Abdullah
PR De'mornay Pierson-el
LS Paul Kelly

RB
Ameer Abdullah
Imani Cross
Terrell Newby

== Game summaries ==
=== Florida Atlantic ===
Florida Atlantic at Nebraska

Team	1	2	3	4	Total
Florida Atlantic	7	0	0	0	7
• #22 Nebraska	14	17	17	7	55

- Date: August 30
- Location: Memorial Stadium, Lincoln, Nebraska
- Game start: 2:43 p.m. CST
- Elapsed time: 3:20
- Game attendance: 91,441
- Game weather: Sunny, 81 °F (27 °C), Wind N@2 mph (3.2 km/h), Humidity 68%
- Referee: Greg Blum
- TV announcers (BTN): Kevin Kugler, Eric Crouch, Damon Benning

Scoring summary
1	9:19	Nebraska	Tommy Armstrong Jr. 5-yard run (Drew Brown kick)	Nebraska 7–0
1	4:56	FAU	Lucky Whitehead 20-yard pass from Jaquez Johnson (Greg Joseph kick)	7–7
1	1:22	Nebraska	Jordan Westerkamp 36-yard pass from Tommy Armstrong Jr. (Drew Brown kick)	Nebraska 14–7
2	12:18	Nebraska	Drew Brown 44-yard field goal	Nebraska 17–7
2	6:29	Nebraska	Ameer Abdullah 47-yard run (Drew Brown kick)	Nebraska 24–7
2	2:30	Nebraska	Imani Cross 3-yard run (Drew Brown kick)	Nebraska 31–7
3	10:18	Nebraska	Terrell Newby 2-yard run (Drew Brown kick)	Nebraska 38–7
3	6:41	Nebraska	Demornay Pierson-El 8-yard pass from Tommy Armstrong Jr. (Drew Brown kick)	Nebraska 45–7
3	3:09	Nebraska	Mauro Bondi 45-yard field goal	Nebraska 48–7
4	13:20	Nebraska	Terrell Newby 1-yard run (Mauro Bondi kick)	Nebraska 55–7

Nebraska opened the 2014 season, the 125th season in program history, with a home game against the Florida Atlantic Owls. Nebraska dominated the game and led from start to finish in a 55–7 rout. The Huskers ended the game with a Big Ten Conference record 784 yards of total offense, while allowing just 200 total yards to FAU. Nebraska now leads the all-time series with FAU 2–0.

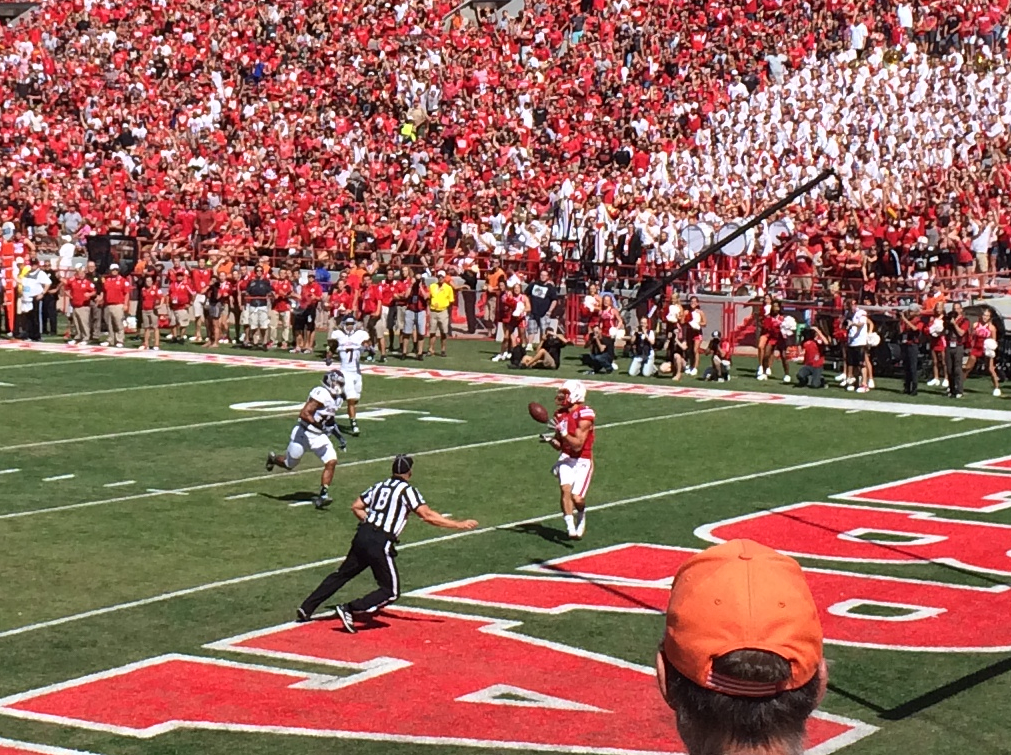
Jordan Westerkamp about to catch a touchdown pass during the first quarter of the Nebraska vs. Florida Atlantic game, August 30, 2014

Florida Atlantic game starters

Position	Player
Quarterback	Tommy Armstrong
Running back	Ameer Abdullah
Wide receiver	Kenny Bell
Wide receiver	Jamal Turner
Wide receiver	Jordan Westerkamp
Tight end	Cethan Carter
Left tackle	Alex Lewis
Left guard	Jake Cotton
Center	Mark Pelini
Right guard	Mike Moudy
Right tackle	Givens Price

Position	Player
Defensive end	Greg Mcmullen
Defensive tackle	Maliek Collins
Defensive tackle	Vincent Valentine
Defensive end	Randy Gregory
Linebacker	David Santos
Linebacker	Josh Banderas
Linebacker	Zaire Anderson
Cornerback	Daniel Davie
Free safety	Corey Cooper
Strong safety	Nate Gerry
Cornerback	Josh Mitchell

=== McNeese State ===
McNeese State at Nebraska

Team	1	2	3	4	Total
McNeese State	7	7	0	10	24
• #19 Nebraska	14	7	3	7	31

- Date: September 6
- Location: Memorial Stadium, Lincoln, Nebraska
- Game start: 11:01 a.m. CST
- Elapsed time: 3:23
- Game attendance: 91,082
- Game weather: Sunny, 64 °F (18 °C), Wind N@7 mph (11 km/h), Humidty 66%
- Referee: Shawn Smith
- TV announcers (ESPNU): Adam Amin, John Congemi

Scoring summary
1	8:26	McNeese State	Derrick Milton, 9-yard run (Alex Kjellsten kick)	MSU 7–0
1	6:44	Nebraska	Jordan Westerkamp, 40-yard pass from Tommy Armstrong Jr. (Drew Brown kick)	7–7
1	3:00	Nebraska	Ameer Abdullah, 2-yard run (Drew Brown kick)	Nebraska 14–7
2	10:08	McNeese State	Aaron Sam, 98-yard INT return	14–14
2	5:47	Nebraska	Tommy Armstrong Jr., 1-yard run (Drew Brown kick)	Nebraska 21–14
3	3:51	Nebraska	Drew Brown, 31-yard field goal	Nebraska 24–14
4	13:45	McNeese State	Tyler Bolfing, 1-yard run (Alex Kjellsten kick)	Nebraska 24–21
4	4:21	McNeese State	Alex Kjellsten, 24-yard field goal	24–24
4	0:20	Nebraska	Ameer Abdullah, 58-yard pass from Tommy Armstrong Jr. (Drew Brown kick)	Nebraska 31–24

Nebraska struggled with FCS opponent McNeese State. Running back Ameer Abdullah broke five tackles on a 58-yard touchdown reception with 20 seconds remaining in the game to lead Nebraska to a 31–24 win at Memorial Stadium. The Huskers totaled 437 yards in offense and allowed 338 to the Cowboys. Tommy Armstrong was 16-of-31 for 242 yards with 2 TDs and an INT passing, and was also the leading rusher with 11 carries for 131 yards and a score. Abdullah added 54 yards rushing with a touchdown on the ground and was the top receiver with three catches for 96 yards and the game-winning score. Jordan Westerkamp added four catches for 61 yards and a TD.

McNeese State game starters

Position	Player
Quarterback	Tommy Armstrong
Running back	Ameer Abdullah
Wide receiver	Kenny Bell
Wide receiver	Jamal Turner
Wide receiver	Jordan Westerkamp
Tight end	Cethan Carter
Left tackle	Alex Lewis
Left guard	Jake Cotton
Center	Mark Pelini
Right guard	Mike Moudy
Right tackle	Zach Sterup

Position	Player
Defensive end	Greg Mcmullen
Defensive tackle	Maliek Collins
Defensive tackle	Vincent Valentine
Defensive end	Jack Gangwish
Linebacker	David Santos
Linebacker	Josh Banderas
Linebacker	Zaire Anderson
Cornerback	Daniel Davie
Free safety	Corey Cooper
Strong safety	Nate Gerry
Cornerback	Josh Mitchell

=== Fresno State ===
Nebraska at Fresno State

Team	1	2	3	4	Total
• Nebraska	14	13	14	14	55
Fresno State	2	3	7	7	19

- Date: September 13
- Location: Bulldog Stadium, Fresno, California
- Game start: 7:40 p.m. PST
- Elapsed time: 3:41
- Game attendance: 41,031
- Game weather: 99 °F (37 °C), Wind SSE@6 mph (9.7 km/h), Partly Cloudy
- Referee: Ron Snodgrass
- TV announcers (CBS Sports Network): Carter Blackburn, Aaron Taylor, Jamie Erdhal

Scoring summary
1	13:14	Nebraska	Jordan Westerkamp 70 yard pass from Tommy Armstrong (Drew Brown kick)	Nebraska 7–0
1	12:03	Nebraska	Ameer Abdullah 57 yard run (Drew Brown kick)	Nebraska 14–0
1	9:09	Fresno State	Team safety	Nebraska 14–2
2	12:18	Nebraska	Drew Brown 38 yard field goal	Nebraska 17–2
2	9:11	Nebraska	Demornay Pierson-El 86 yard punt return (Drew Brown kick)	Nebraska 24–2
2	5:40	Nebraska	Drew Brown, 22 yard field goal	Nebraska 27–2
2	2:08	Fresno State	Kody Kroening 27 yard field goal	Nebraska 27–5
3	11:50	Nebraska	Cethan Carter 20 yard pass from Tommy Armstrong (Drew Brown kick)	Nebraska 34–5
3	4:42	Fresno State	Brian Burrell 66 yard run (Kody Kroening kick)	Nebraska 34–12
3	2:47	Nebraska	Imani Cross 62 yard run (Drew Brown kick)	Nebraska 41–12
4	10:48	Nebraska	Sam Cotton 23 yard pass from Tommy Armstrong (Drew Brown kick)	Nebraska 48–12
4	6:25	Fresno State	Delvon Hardaway 9 yard pass from Brian Burrell (Kody Kroening kick)	Nebraska 48–19
4	3:04	Nebraska	C. Bailey 10 yard pass from Ryker Fyfe (Drew Brown kick)	Nebraska 55–19

This was Nebraska's first road game of the 2014 season, taking on the Fresno State Bulldogs in Fresno, California. The two teams had only met once before, a 42–29 Nebraska win in Lincoln in 2011. Nebraska gained 562 yards of offense and never trailed in a 55–19 win over Fresno State. Tommy Armstrong threw for 260 yards and Ameer Abdullah rushed for 110 to lead the Huskers to a 3–0 start on the season. For the first time since 2007, Nebraska wore all-white uniforms whereas Fresno State wore alternate all-red ones.

Fresno State game starters

Position	Player
Quarterback	Tommy Armstrong
Running back	Ameer Abdullah
Wide receiver	Kenny Bell
Wide receiver	Alonzo Moore
Wide receiver	Jordan Westerkamp
Tight end	Cethan Carter
Left tackle	Alex Lewis
Left guard	Jake Cotton
Center	Mark Pelini
Right guard	Mike Moudy
Right tackle	Zach Sterup

Position	Player
Defensive end	Greg Mcmullen
Defensive tackle	Maliek Collins
Defensive tackle	Vincent Valentine
Defensive end	Randy Gregory
Linebacker	Josh Banderas
Cornerback	Daniel Davie
Free safety	Corey Cooper
Strong safety	Nate Gerry
Cornerback	Josh Mitchell
Nickelback	Byerson Cockrell
Nickelback	Joshua Kalu

=== Miami (FL) ===
Miami (FL) at Nebraska

Team	1	2	3	4	Total
Miami (FL)	7	7	7	10	31
• #24 Nebraska	7	10	14	10	41

- Date: September 20
- Location: Memorial Stadium, Lincoln, NE
- Game start: 7:06 p.m. CST
- Elapsed time: 3:24
- Game attendance: 91,585
- Game weather: Sunny, 76 °F (24 °C), Wind NNW@5-12 mph (19 km/h), Humidty 42%
- Referee: Dennis Hennigan
- TV announcers (ESPN2): Joe Tessitore, Brock Huard, Shannon Spake

Scoring summary
1	10:26	Miami	Duke Johnson 2 yard run (Michael Badgley kick)	Miami 7–0
1	8:12	Nebraska	Kenny Bell 40 yard pass from Tommy Armstrong (Drew Brown kick)	7–7
2	13:52	Miami	Clive Walford 6 yard pass from Brad Kaaya (Michael Badgley kick)	Miami 14–7
2	7:10	Nebraska	Ameer Abdullah 3 yard pass from Tommy Armstrong (Drew Brown kick)	14–14
2	0:00	Nebraska	Drew Brown 19 yard field goal	Nebraska 17–14
3	10:06	Nebraska	Ameer Abdullah 6 yard run (Drew Brown kick)	Nebraska 24–14
3	5:09	Miami	Malcolm Lewis 9 yard pass from Brad Kaaya (Michael Badgley kick)	Nebraska 24–21
3	2:23	Nebraska	Josh Mitchell 57 yard fumble recovery (Drew Brown kick)	Nebraska 31–21
4	13:37	Miami	Michael Badgley 34 yard field goal	Nebraska 31–24
4	9:21	Nebraska	Drew Brown 39 yard field goal	Nebraska 34–24
4	4:13	Nebraska	Ameer Abdullah 10 yard run (Drew Brown kick)	Nebraska 41–24
4	0:18	Miami	Braxton Berrios 4 yard pass from Brad Kaaya (Michael Badgley kick)	Nebraska 41–31

Nebraska hosted the Miami Hurricanes in game four of the 2014 season. This was the 11th meeting in the all-time series which was tied at five wins apiece. It was the first regular season meeting between the two since a 17–9 Nebraska win in 1976. The first meeting between the two took place in 1951 was the first-ever night game at Memorial Stadium. The Gotham Bowl matchup was Nebraska's first-ever bowl victory. Each of the past five bowl meetings for the two saw the winner declared the national champion. Nebraska won 41–31 making it the 400th win in Memorial Stadium history. The tunnel walk before the game featured the 1994 team including former Nebraska coach Tom Osborne to commemorate the 20th anniversary of defeating Miami for the national championship.

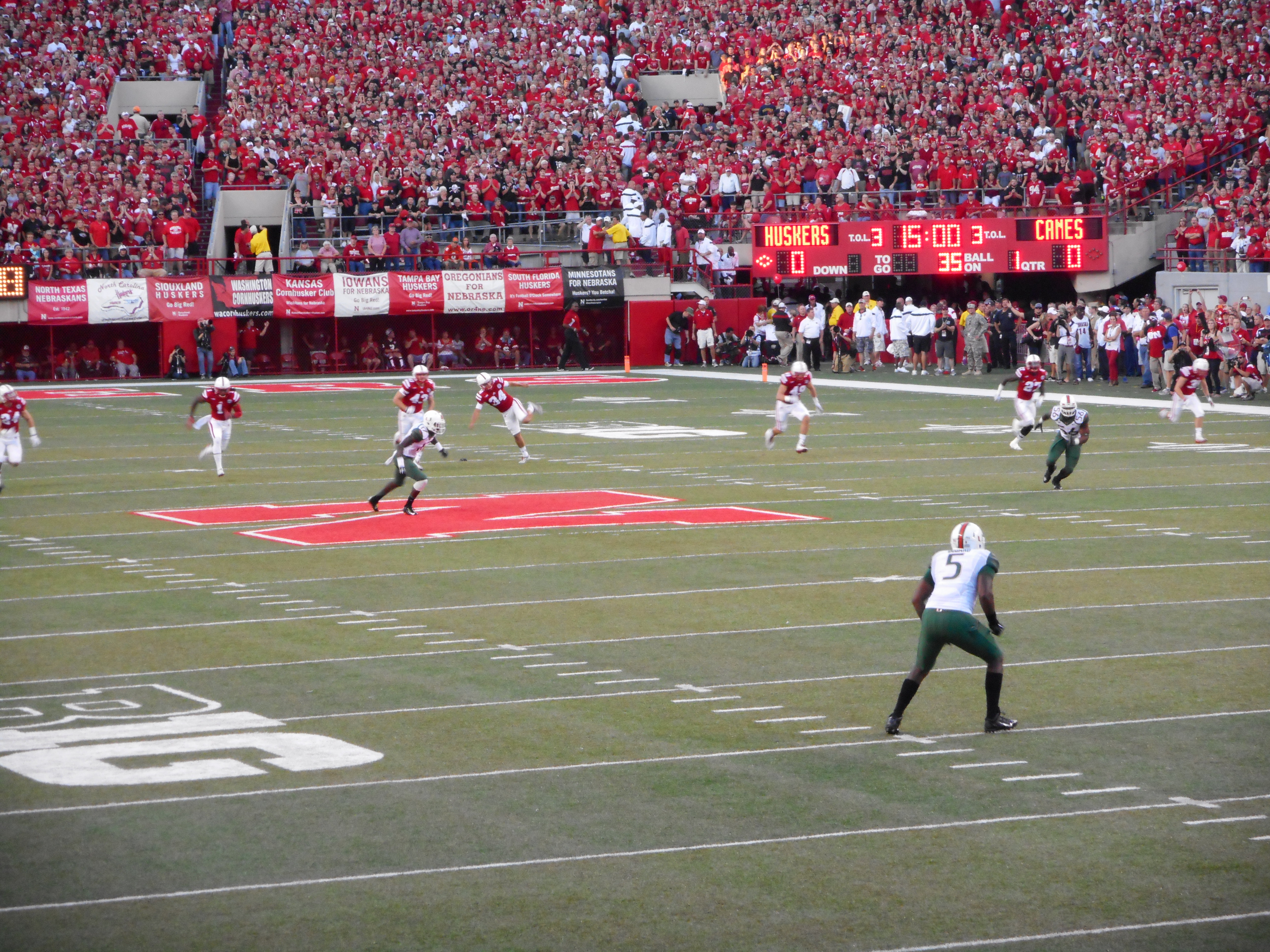
Opening kickoff.

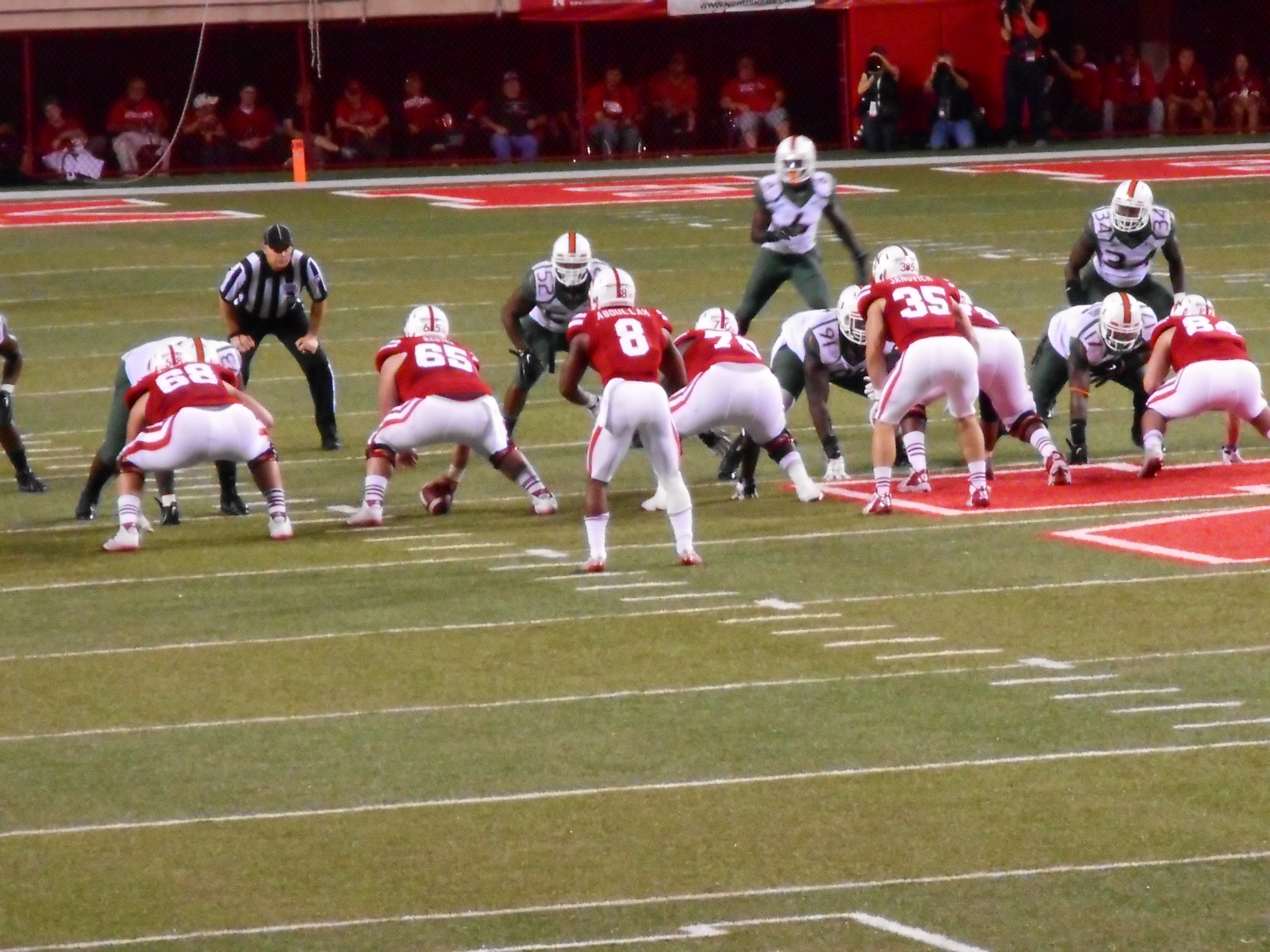
Ameer Abdullah about to receive a snap from center.

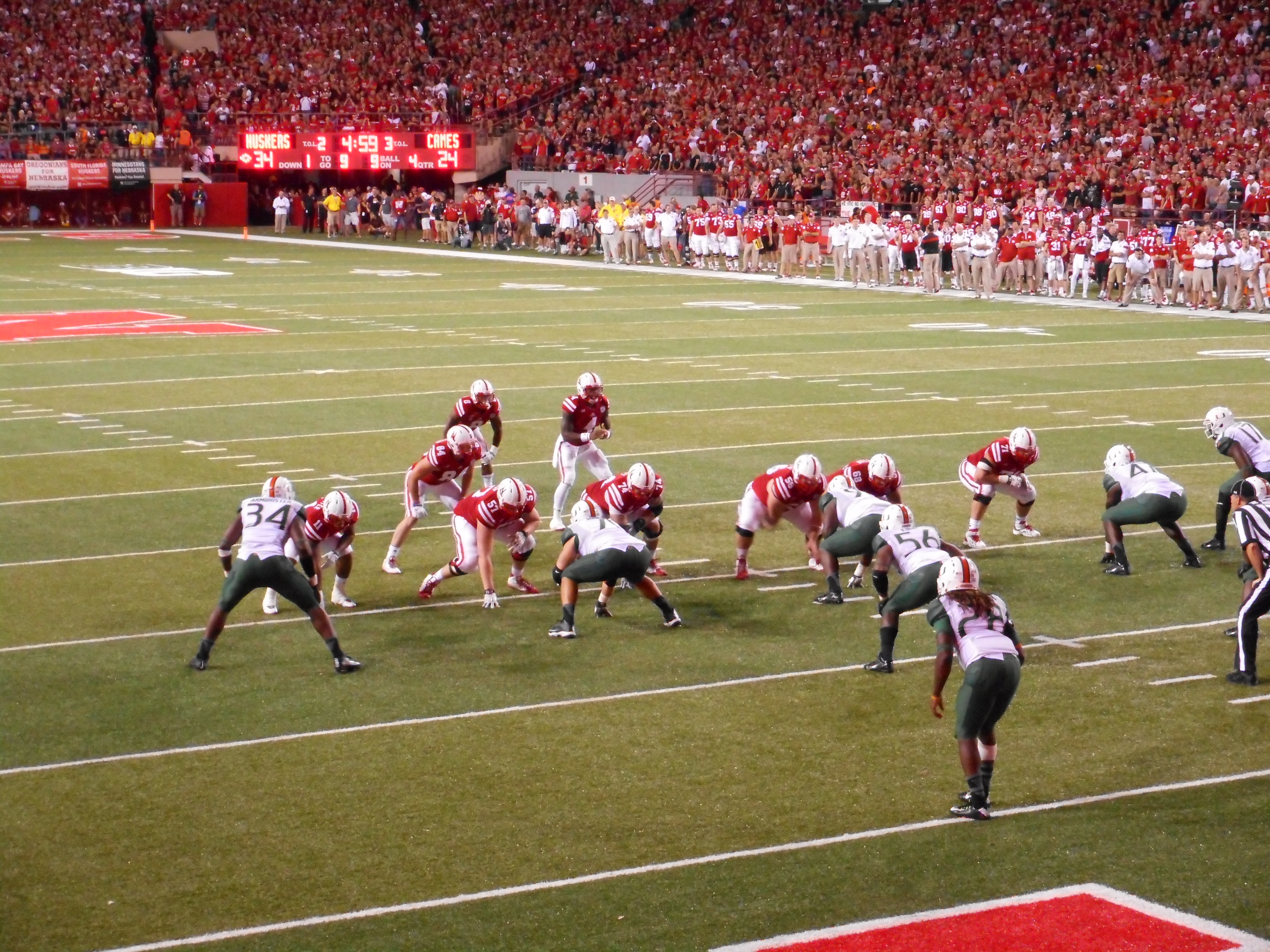
Nebraska with the ball on their final touchdown drive.

Miami game starters

Position	Player
Quarterback	Tommy Armstrong
Running back	Ameer Abdullah
Wide receiver	Kenny Bell
Wide receiver	Alonzo Moore
Wide receiver	Jordan Westerkamp
Tight end	Cethan Carter
Left tackle	Alex Lewis
Left guard	Jake Cotton
Center	Mark Pelini
Right guard	Mike Moudy
Right tackle	Zach Sterup

Position	Player
Defensive end	Greg Mcmullen
Defensive tackle	Maliek Collins
Defensive tackle	Vincent Valentine
Defensive end	Randy Gregory
Linebacker	David Santos
Linebacker	Josh Banderas
Linebacker	Zaire Anderson
Cornerback	Daniel Davie
Free safety	Corey Cooper
Strong safety	Nate Gerry
Cornerback	Josh Mitchell

=== Illinois ===
Illinois at Nebraska

Team	1	2	3	4	Total
Illinois	7	7	0	0	14
• #24 Nebraska	7	24	7	7	45

- Date: September 27
- Location: Memorial Stadium, Lincoln, NE
- Game start: 8:13 p.m. CST
- Elapsed time: 3:24
- Game attendance: 91,255
- Game weather: Clear, 74 °F (23 °C), Wind S@11 mph (18 km/h), Humidty 56%
- Referee: Dave Witvoet
- TV announcers (BTN): Kevin Kugler, Chuck Long, Rebecca Haarlow

Scoring summary
1	12:27	Nebraska	Ameer Abdullah 12 yard run (Drew Brown kick)	Nebraska 7–0
1	11:24	Illinois	Josh Ferguson 41 yard run (David Reisner kick)	7–7
2	13:21	Nebraska	Ameer Abdullah 8 yard run (Drew Brown kick)	Nebraska 14–7
2	9:52	Nebraska	Ameer Abdullah 2 yard run (Drew Brown kick)	Nebraska 21–7
2	8:43	Nebraska	Kenny Bell 63 yard pass from Tommy Armstrong (Drew Brown kick)	Nebraska 28–7
2	7:27	Illinois	Geronimo Allen 58 yard pass from Reilly O'Toole (David Reisner kick)	Nebraska 28–14
2	2:48	Nebraska	Drew Brown 29 yard field goal	Nebraska 31–14
3	7:56	Nebraska	Imani Cross 4 yard run (Drew Brown kick)	Nebraska 38–14
4	4:58	Nebraska	Terrell Newby 6 yard run (Drew Brown kick)	Nebraska 45–14

Nebraska opened up Big Ten play with a game against Illinois at home on Homecoming. The Huskers improved to 9–2–1 all-time against the Illini behind the rushing of Ameer Abdullah who put up 196 yards in the first half and 208 total yards and three touchdowns. The Huskers rushed for over 400 yards as a team en route to a dominating 45–14 victory. Nebraska broke out their "Red Rising" alternate uniforms from Adidas in this game. During the halftime performance, Nebraska's marching band spelled out "Fear Ameer" on the field.

Illinois game starters

Position	Player
Quarterback	Tommy Armstrong
Running back	Ameer Abdullah
Wide receiver	Kenny Bell
Wide receiver	Alonzo Moore
Wide receiver	Jordan Westerkamp
Tight end	Cethan Carter
Left tackle	Alex Lewis
Left guard	Jake Cotton
Center	Mark Pelini
Right guard	Mike Moudy
Right tackle	Zach Sterup

Position	Player
Defensive end	Greg Mcmullen
Defensive tackle	Maliek Collins
Defensive tackle	Vincent Valentine
Defensive end	Randy Gregory
Linebacker	Zaire Anderson
Cornerback	Daniel Davie
Free safety	Corey Cooper
Strong safety	Nate Gerry
Cornerback	Josh Mitchell
Nickelback	Byerson Cockrell
Nickelback	Joshua Kalu

=== Michigan State ===
Nebraska at Michigan State

Team	1	2	3	4	Total
#19 Nebraska	0	0	3	19	22
• #10 Michigan State	7	10	10	0	27

- Date: October 4
- Location: Spartan Stadium, East Lansing, MI
- Game start: 8:14 p.m. EST
- Elapsed time: 3:54
- Game attendance: 75,923
- Game weather: Lt. Rain, 42 °F (6 °C), Wind WSW@12 mph (19 km/h)
- Referee: John O'Neill
- TV announcers (ABC): Chris Fowler, Kirk Herbstreit, Heather Cox

Scoring summary
1	8:22	Michigan State	Tony Lippett 55 yard pass from Connor Cook (Michael Geiger kick)	Michigan State 7–0
2	13:48	Michigan State	Jeremy Langford 31 yard run (Michael Geiger kick)	Michigan State 14–0
2	4:32	Michigan State	Michael Geiger 28 yard field goal	Michigan State 17–0
3	9:18	Michigan State	Michael Geiger 27 yard field goal	Michigan State 20–0
3	6:12	Nebraska	Drew Brown 40 yard field goal	Michigan State 20–3
3	2:02	Michigan State	Tony Lippett 32 yard run (Michael Geiger kick)	Michigan State 27–3
4	12:49	Nebraska	Ameer Abdullah 2 yard run (2 point conversion failed)	Michigan State 27–9
4	4:10	Nebraska	Ameer Abdullah 1 yard run (Drew Brown kick)	Michigan State 27–16
4	3:22	Nebraska	De'Mornay Pierson-El 62 yard punt return (2 point conversion failed)	Michigan State 27–22

19th-ranked Nebraska traveled to East Lansing, Michigan to take on #10 Michigan State in a key Big Ten conference matchup. Heading into the game Nebraska was 7–1 all-time against the Spartans, with MSU picking up their first ever win over Nebraska last year in Lincoln by a score of 41–28. In the game Michigan State jumped out to a 27–3 lead going into the fourth quarter before the Huskers rallied with a 19-point final quarter. Nebraska was driving with the ball with less than a minute to go before throwing a game-ending interception to lose the first game of the year 27–22.

Michigan State game starters

Position	Player
Quarterback	Tommy Armstrong
Running back	Ameer Abdullah
Wide receiver	Kenny Bell
Wide receiver	Alonzo Moore
Wide receiver	Jordan Westerkamp
Tight end	Sam Cotton
Left tackle	Alex Lewis
Left guard	Jake Cotton
Center	Mark Pelini
Right guard	Mike Moudy
Right tackle	Givens Price

Position	Player
Defensive end	Greg Mcmullen
Defensive tackle	Maliek Collins
Defensive tackle	Vincent Valentine
Defensive end	Randy Gregory
Linebacker	Trevor Roach
Linebacker	Josh Banderas
Linebacker	Zaire Anderson
Cornerback	Daniel Davie
Free safety	Corey Cooper
Strong safety	Nate Gerry
Cornerback	Josh Mitchell

=== Northwestern ===
Nebraska at Northwestern

Team	1	2	3	4	Total
• #19 Nebraska	0	14	7	17	38
Northwestern	7	10	0	0	17

- Date: October 18
- Location: Ryan Field, Evanston, IL
- Game start: 6:30 p.m. CST
- Elapsed time: 3:34
- Game attendance: 47,330
- Game weather: Mostly Cloudy, 47 °F (8 °C), Wind N@10 mph (16 km/h)
- Referee: Jerry McGinn
- TV announcers (BTN): Kevin Kugler, Glen Mason, Lisa Byington

Scoring summary
1	5:58	Northwestern	Justin Jackson 2 yard run (Jack Mitchell kick)	Northwestern 7–0
2	10:14	Nebraska	Ameer Abdullah 1 yard run (Drew Brown kick)	7–7
2	1:52	Northwestern	Justin Jackson 5 yard run (Mitchell kick)	Northwestern 14–7
2	1:14	Nebraska	De'Mornay Pierson-El 16 yard pass to Tommy Armstrong Jr. (Brown kick)	14–14
2	0:03	Northwestern	Mitchell 29 yard field goal	Northwestern 17–14
3	4:27	Nebraska	Abdullah 1 yard run (Brown kick)	Nebraska 21–17
4	13:16	Nebraska	Abdullah 1 yard run (Brown kick)	Nebraska 28–17
4	7:36	Nebraska	Abdullah 1 yard run (Brown kick)	Nebraska 35–17
4	4:28	Nebraska	Brown 33 yard field goal	Nebraska 38–17

19th-ranked Nebraska traveled to Evanston, Illinois, to take on the Northwestern Wildcats in a Big Ten West Division match-up. Coming into the game Nebraska led the all-time series with the Wildcats five games to two. Last year the Huskers captured a 27–24 victory on a last second Hail Mary touchdown pass. This year's game the two teams played even through two quarters of football before Nebraska pulled away in the second half. Ameer Abdullah recorded a career-high four TDs as the Huskers pulled out a 38–17 victory. Once again, Nebraska wore all white uniforms for this game while Northwestern wore alternate ones for Homecoming.

Northwestern game starters

Position	Player
Quarterback	Tommy Armstrong
Running back	Ameer Abdullah
Wide receiver	Kenny Bell
Wide receiver	Alonzo Moore
Wide receiver	Jordan Westerkamp
Tight end	Sam Cotton
Left tackle	Alex Lewis
Left guard	Jake Cotton
Center	Mark Pelini
Right guard	Mike Moudy
Right tackle	Zach Sterup

Position	Player
Defensive end	Greg Mcmullen
Defensive tackle	Maliek Collins
Defensive tackle	Vincent Valentine
Defensive end	Randy Gregory
Linebacker	Trevor Roach
Linebacker	Zaire Anderson
Cornerback	Daniel Davie
Free safety	Corey Cooper
Strong safety	Nate Gerry
Cornerback	Josh Mitchell
Nickelback	Byerson Cockrell

=== Rutgers ===
Rutgers at Nebraska

Team	1	2	3	4	Total
Rutgers	7	0	10	7	24
• #16 Nebraska	7	14	14	7	42

- Date: October 25
- Location: Memorial Stadium, Lincoln, NE
- Game start: 11:01 a.m. CST
- Elapsed time: 3:13
- Game attendance: 91,088
- Game weather: Sunny, 61 °F (16 °C), Wind N@5-10 mph (16 km/h), Humidity 71%
- Referee: Mike Cannon
- TV announcers (ESPN2): Beth Mowins, Joey Galloway, Paul Carcaterra

Scoring summary
1	6:48	Nebraska	Tommy Armstrong 16 yard run (Drew Brown kick)	Nebraska 7–0
1	0:10	Rutgers	Leonte Carroo 71 yard pass from Gary Nova (Kyle Federico kick)	7–7
2	13:39	Nebraska	Ameer Abdullah 53 yard run (Drew Brown kick)	Nebraska 14–7
2	10:28	Nebraska	Ameer Abdullah 48 yard run (Drew Brown kick)	Nebraska 21–7
3	12:08	Nebraska	Sam Cotton 8 yard pass from Tommy Armstrong (Drew Brown kick)	Nebraska 28–7
3	9:10	Rutgers	Kyle Federico 41 yard field goal	Nebraska 28–10
3	6:35	Nebraska	Jordan Westerkamp 4 yard pass from Tommy Armstrong (Drew Brown kick)	Nebraska 35–10
3	0:04	Rutgers	Desmon Peoples 3 yard run (Kyle Federico kick)	Nebraska 35–17
4	8:07	Nebraska	Ameer Abdullah 23 yard run (Drew Brown kick)	Nebraska 42–17
4	5:11	Rutgers	Robert Martin 4 yard run (Kyle Federico kick)	Nebraska 42–24

Nebraska returned home for the first time in four weeks as the Huskers hosted Big Ten newcomer Rutgers. This was the first ever visit to Memorial Stadium by the Scarlet Knights, and was just the second all-time meeting between the two programs. The only other meeting came back in 1920, with the Huskers prevailing 28–0 at the New York Polo Grounds. The 94-year gap between games in the series is the longest for Nebraska against any opponent in school history.

In the matchup, Ameer Abdullah rushed for 225 yards and set a single-game school record with 341 all-purpose yards and scored three TDs to lead Nebraska to a 42–24 win over the Scarlet Knights. Abdullah now has 6,604 career all-purpose yards, extending his school record and moving past Ohio State's Archie Griffin into second place in Big Ten history. Also, wide receiver Kenny Bell became Nebraska's career receptions leader with 167.

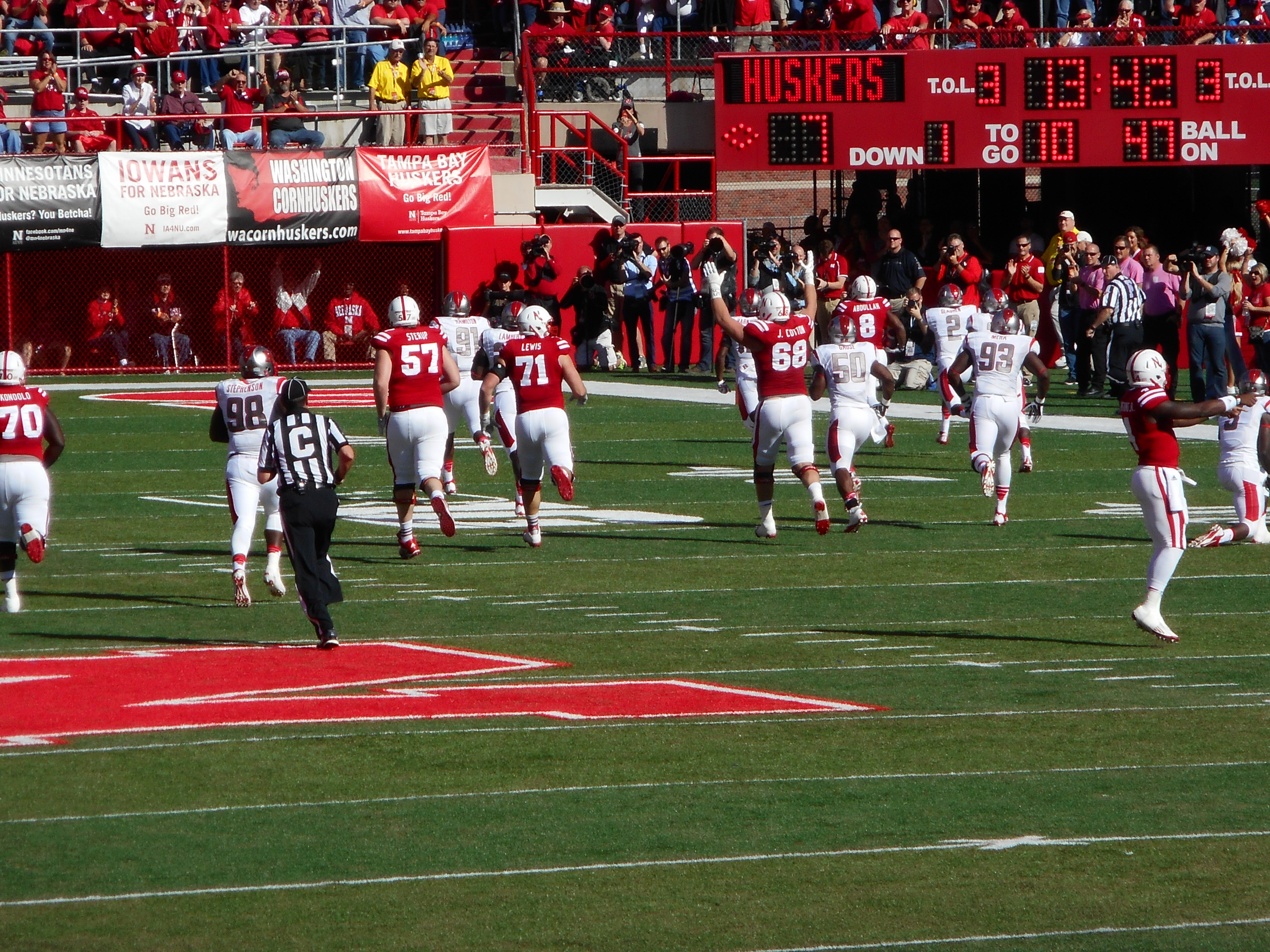
Ameer Abdullah running for a 53-yard touchdown (Nebraska vs Rutgers, 2014)

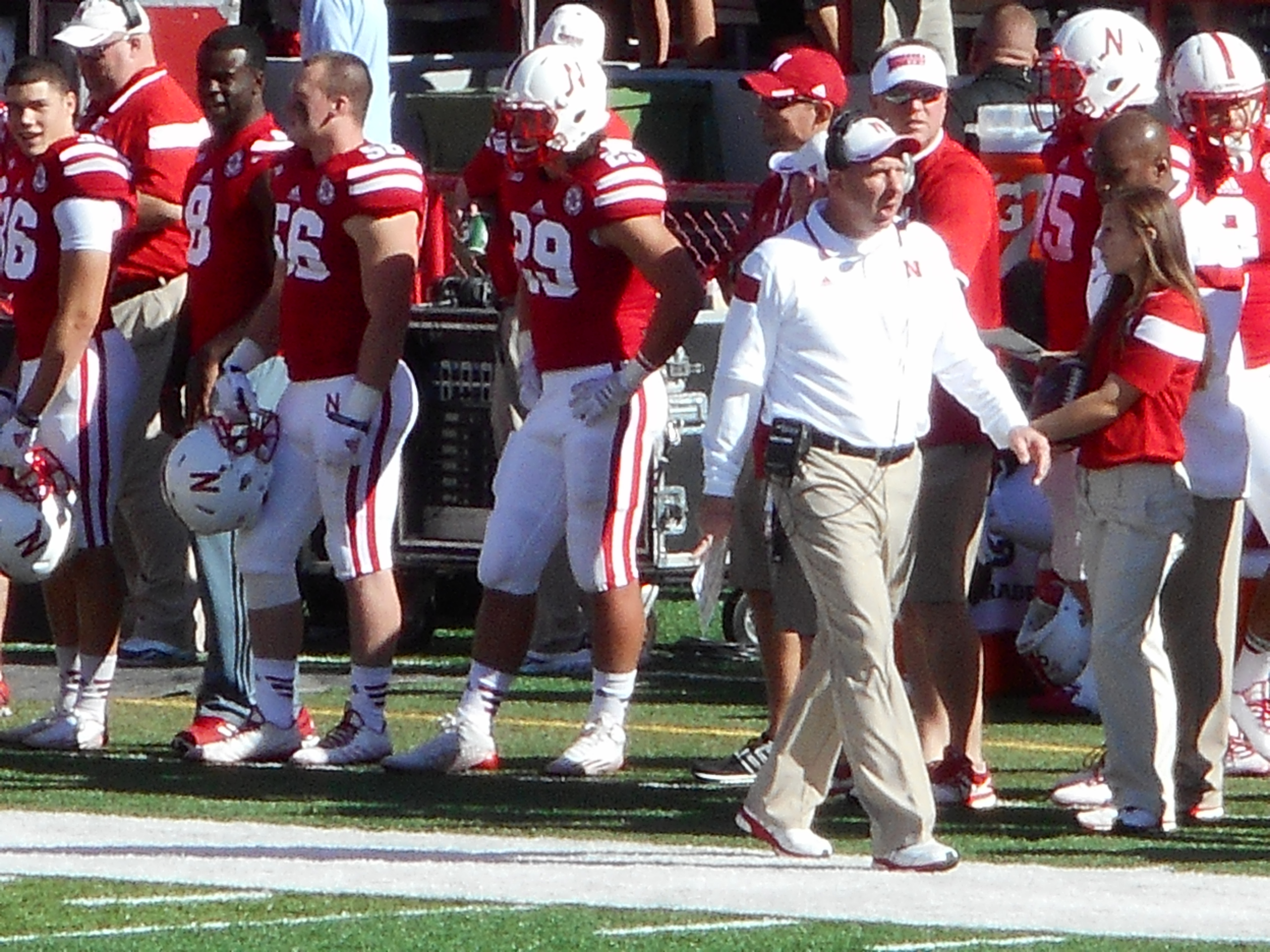
Bo Pelini on the sideline (Nebraska vs. Rutgers, 2014)

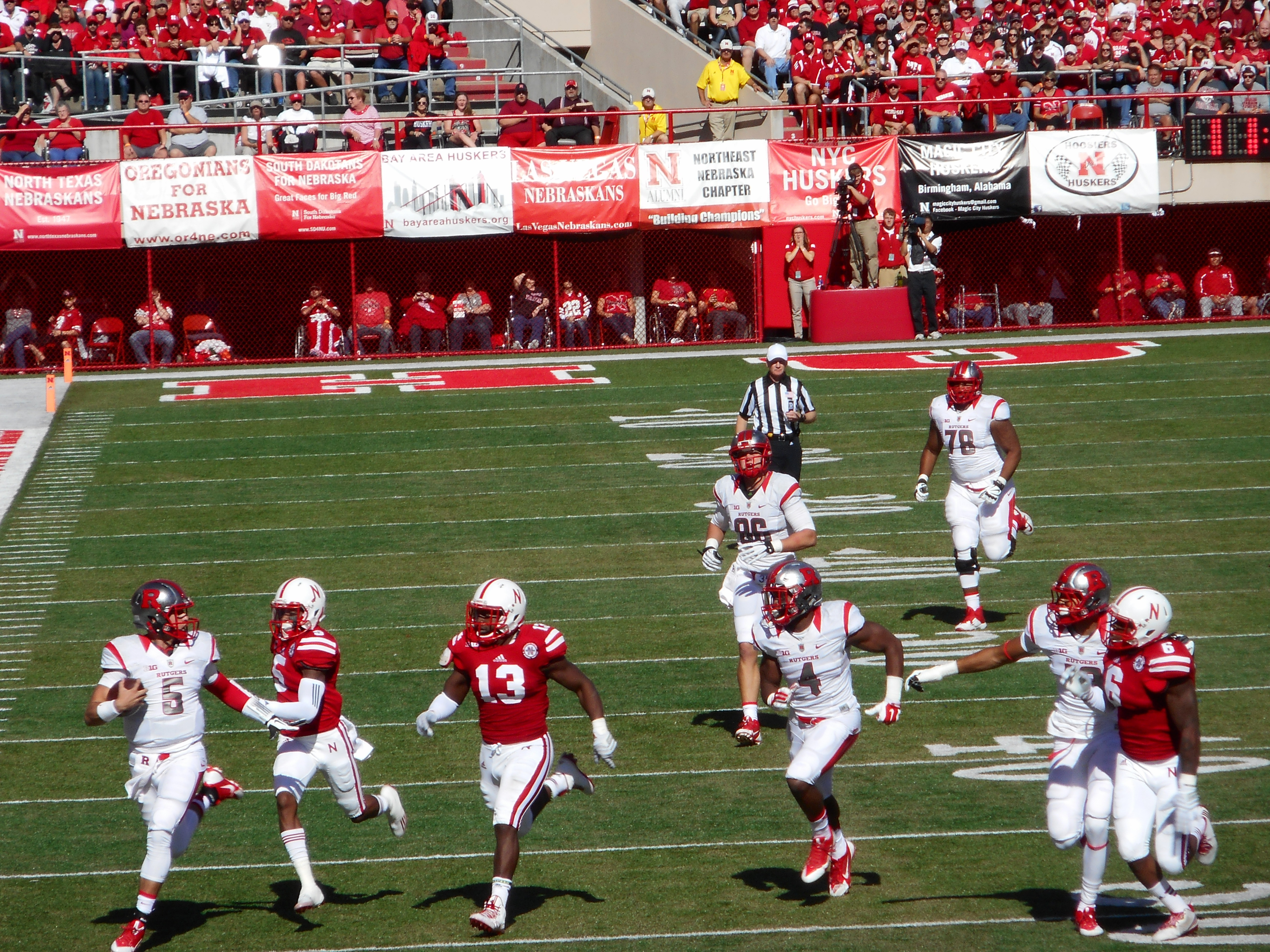
Rutgers' quarterback Chris Laviano runs for a long gain (Nebraska vs. Rutgers, 2014).

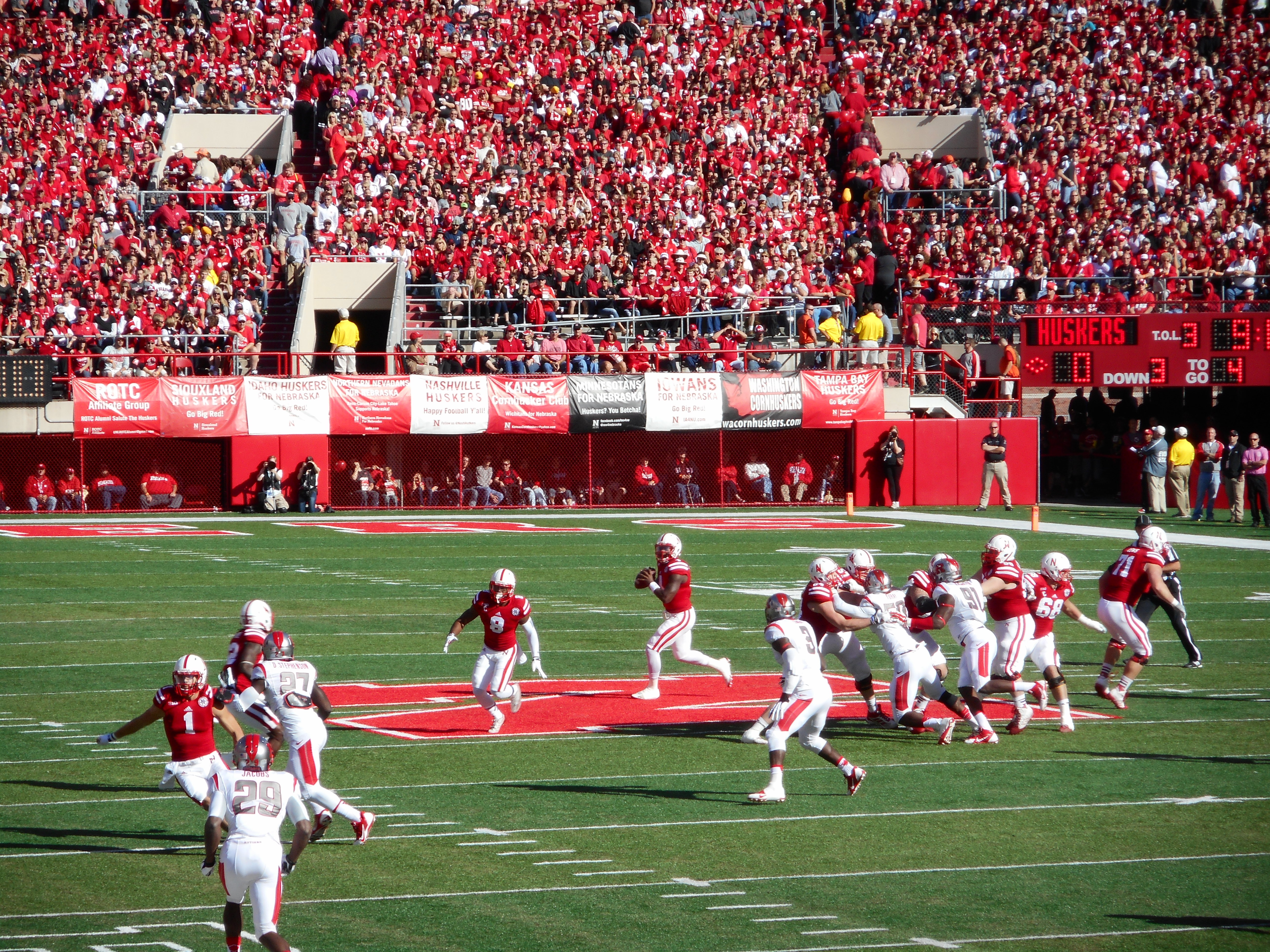
Tommy Armstrong Jr. rolls out to pass (Nebraska vs. Rutgers, 2014).

Rutgers game starters

Position	Player
Quarterback	Tommy Armstrong
Running back	Ameer Abdullah
Wide receiver	Kenny Bell
Wide receiver	De'mornay Pierson-El
Wide receiver	Jordan Westerkamp
Tight end	Sam Cotton
Left tackle	Alex Lewis
Left guard	Jake Cotton
Center	Mark Pelini
Right guard	Mike Moudy
Right tackle	Zach Sterup

Position	Player
Defensive end	Greg Mcmullen
Defensive tackle	Maliek Collins
Defensive tackle	Vincent Valentine
Defensive end	Randy Gregory
Linebacker	David Santos
Linebacker	Trevor Roach
Linebacker	Zaire Anderson
Cornerback	Daniel Davie
Free safety	Corey Cooper
Strong safety	Nate Gerry
Cornerback	Josh Mitchell

=== Purdue ===
Purdue at Nebraska

Team	1	2	3	4	Total
Purdue	0	7	0	7	14
• #17 Nebraska	7	14	7	7	35

- Date: November 1
- Location: Memorial Stadium, Lincoln, NE
- Game start: 2:37 p.m. CST
- Elapsed time: 3:28
- Game attendance: 91,107
- Game weather: Sunny, 50 °F (10 °C), Wind S@15-25 mph (40 km/h), Humidity 37%
- Referee: Dan Capron
- TV announcers (ABC / ESPN2): Mike Patrick, Ed Cunningham, Jeannine Edwards

Scoring summary
1	13:25	Nebraska	De'Mornay Pierson-El 17 yard pass from Tommy Armstrong (Drew Brown kick)	Nebraska 7–0
2	11:48	Purdue	Austin Appleby 25 yard run (Paul Griggs kick)	7–7
2	8:09	Nebraska	Imani Cross 2 yard run (Drew Brown kick)	Nebraska 14–7
2	3:35	Nebraska	Tommy Armstrong 29 yard run (Drew Brown kick)	Nebraska 21–7
3	4:19	Nebraska	Imani Cross 1 yard run (Drew Brown kick)	Nebraska 28–7
4	10:18	Purdue	Cameron Posey 23 yard pass from Austin Appleby (Paul Griggs kick)	Nebraska 28–14
4	2:00	Nebraska	Terrell Newby 7 yard run (Drew Brown kick)	Nebraska 35–14

Purdue visited Memorial Stadium for the first time in program history on Saturday, November 1, 2014. Nebraska came away with a 35–14 victory in a game that saw Heisman Trophy candidate Ameer Abdullah suffer a knee injury early in the game that knocked him out of the contest.

Purdue game starters

Position	Player
Quarterback	Tommy Armstrong
Running back	Ameer Abdullah
Wide receiver	Kenny Bell
Wide receiver	De'mornay Pierson-El
Wide receiver	Jordan Westerkamp
Tight end	Sam Cotton
Left tackle	Alex Lewis
Left guard	Jake Cotton
Center	Mark Pelini
Right guard	Mike Moudy
Right tackle	Zach Sterup

Position	Player
Defensive end	Greg Mcmullen
Defensive tackle	Maliek Collins
Defensive tackle	Kevin Williams
Defensive end	Randy Gregory
Linebacker	David Santos
Linebacker	Trevor Roach
Linebacker	Zaire Anderson
Cornerback	Daniel Davie
Free safety	Corey Cooper
Strong safety	Nate Gerry
Cornerback	Josh Mitchell

=== Wisconsin ===
Nebraska at Wisconsin

Team	1	2	3	4	Total
#11 Nebraska	10	7	0	7	24
• #22 Wisconsin	3	21	28	7	59

- Date: November 15
- Location: Camp Randall Stadium, Madison, WI
- Game start: 2:30 p.m. CST
- Elapsed time: 3:34
- Game attendance: 80,539
- Game weather: Overcast, 26 °F (−3 °C), Wind W@5 mph (8.0 km/h)
- Referee: John O'Neill
- TV announcers (ABC): Sean McDonough, Chris Spielman, Todd McShay

Scoring summary
1	12:24	Nebraska	Drew Brown 32 yard field goal	Nebraska 3–0
1	9:21	Nebraska	Kenny Bell 12 yard pass from Tommy Armstrong (Drew Brown kick)	Nebraska 10–0
1	6:10	Wisconsin	R. Gaglianone 26 yard field goal	Nebraska 10–3
2	14:12	Nebraska	Tommy Armstrong 5 yard run (Drew Brown kick)	Nebraska 17–3
2	12:21	Wisconsin	Melvin Gordon 62 yard run (R. Gaglianone kick)	Nebraska 17–10
2	7:21	Wisconsin	Corey Clement 17 yard run (R. Gaglianone kick)	17–17
2	3:31	Wisconsin	Sam Arneson 5 yard pass from Joel Stave (R. Gaglianone kick)	Wisconsin 24–17
3	8:06	Wisconsin	Melvin Gordon 1 yard run (R. Gaglianone kick)	Wisconsin 31–17
3	5:46	Wisconsin	Melvin Gordon 6 yard run (R. Gaglianone kick)	Wisconsin 38–17
3	1:00	Wisconsin	Tanner McEvoy 11 yard run (R. Gaglianone kick)	Wisconsin 45–17
3	0:00	Wisconsin	Melvin Gordon 26 yard run (R. Gaglianone kick)	Wisconsin 52–17
4	5:34	Wisconsin	Dar Ogunbowale 8 yard run (R. Gaglianone kick)	Wisconsin 59–17
4	2:54	Nebraska	Terrell Newby 2 yard run (Drew Brown kick)	Wisconsin 59–24

Nebraska traveled to Madison, Wisconsin to take on the Wisconsin Badgers in a key Big Ten West Division game on Saturday. Melvin Gordon ran for a new FBS single-game rushing record 408 yards. The Badgers scored 56 unanswered points after the Huskers started the game with a 17–3 lead to win the contest and the inaugural Freedom Trophy by a 59–24 score.

Wisconsin game starters

Position	Player
Quarterback	Tommy Armstrong
Running back	Ameer Abdullah
Wide receiver	Kenny Bell
Wide receiver	De'mornay Pierson-El
Wide receiver	Jordan Westerkamp
Tight end	Cethan Carter
Left tackle	Alex Lewis
Left guard	Jake Cotton
Center	Mark Pelini
Right guard	Mike Moudy
Right tackle	Zach Sterup

Position	Player
Defensive end	Greg Mcmullen
Defensive tackle	Maliek Collins
Defensive tackle	Vincent Valentine
Defensive end	Randy Gregory
Linebacker	David Santos
Linebacker	Trevor Roach
Linebacker	Zaire Anderson
Cornerback	Daniel Davie
Free safety	Corey Cooper
Strong safety	Nate Gerry
Cornerback	Josh Mitchell

=== Minnesota ===
Minnesota at Nebraska

Team	1	2	3	4	Total
• Minnesota	7	0	14	7	28
#21 Nebraska	7	14	3	0	24

- Date: November 22
- Location: Memorial Stadium, Lincoln, NE
- Game start: 11:02 a.m. CST
- Elapsed time: 3:20
- Game attendance: 91,186
- Game weather: Overcast, 44 °F (7 °C), Wind SSW@13 mph (21 km/h), Humidity 37%
- Referee: Jerry McGinn
- TV announcers (ESPN): Dave Pasch, Brian Griese, Tom Luginbill

Scoring summary
1	9:42	Nebraska	Ameer Abdullah 2 yard run (Drew Brown kick)	Nebraska 7–0
1	4:43	Minnesota	Mitch Leidner 1 yard run (Ryan Santoso kick)	7–7
2	10:57	Nebraska	De'Mornay Pierson-El 18 yard pass from Tommy Armstrong (Drew Brown kick)	Nebraska 14–7
2	5:18	Nebraska	Nate Gerry 85 yard blocked field goal return (Drew Brown kick)	Nebraska 21–7
3	11:14	Minnesota	David Cobb 17 yard run (Ryan Santoso kick)	Nebraska 21–14
3	7:19	Nebraska	Drew Brown 30 yard field goal	Nebraska 24–14
3	1:47	Minnesota	Rodrick Williams 19 yard run (Ryan Santoso kick)	Nebraska 24–21
4	3:25	Minnesota	Mitch Leidner 3 yard run (Ryan Santoso kick)	Minnesota 28–24

Nebraska completed its 2014 home schedule when Minnesota came to Memorial Stadium on Saturday, November 22 for Senior Day. The Golden Gophers lead the all-time series 30–22–2, and Nebraska leads 2–1 since joining the Big Ten Conference. The Gophers overcame a 14-point halftime deficit to defeat Nebraska for the second straight season and clinch a winning Big Ten season for the first time since the 2003 season with a 28–24 win.

Minnesota game starters

Position	Player
Quarterback	Tommy Armstrong
Running back	Ameer Abdullah
Wide receiver	Kenny Bell
Wide receiver	De'mornay Pierson-El
Wide receiver	Jordan Westerkamp
Tight end	Cethan Carter
Left tackle	Alex Lewis
Left guard	Jake Cotton
Center	Mark Pelini
Right guard	Mike Moudy
Right tackle	Zach Sterup

Position	Player
Defensive end	Greg Mcmullen
Defensive tackle	Maliek Collins
Defensive tackle	Vincent Valentine
Defensive end	Randy Gregory
Linebacker	David Santos
Linebacker	Zaire Anderson
Cornerback	Daniel Davie
Free safety	Corey Cooper
Strong safety	Nate Gerry
Cornerback	Josh Mitchell
Nickelback	Byerson Cockrell

=== Iowa ===
Nebraska at Iowa

Team	1	2	3	4	OT	Total
• Nebraska	0	7	7	17	6	37
Iowa	0	10	14	7	3	34

- Date: November 28
- Location: Kinnick Stadium, Iowa City, IA
- Game start: 11:05 a.m. CST
- Elapsed time: 3:44
- Game attendance: 66,897
- Game weather: Mostly Cloudy, 28 °F (−2 °C), Wind S@5-15 mph (24 km/h)
- Referee: Mike Cannon
- TV announcers (ABC): Bob Wischusen, Matt Millen, Quint Kessenich

Scoring summary
2	9:07	Iowa	John Lowdermilk 17 yard interception return (Marshall Koehn kick)	Iowa 7–0
2	1:44	Iowa	Marshall Koehn 22 yard field goal	Iowa 10–0
2	0:20	Nebraska	Ameer Abdullah 5 yard pass from Tommy Armstrong (Drew Brown kick)	Iowa 10–7
3	11:21	Iowa	Tevaun Smith 37 yard pass from Jake Rudock (Marshall Koehn kick)	Iowa 17–7
3	8:45	Iowa	Drew Ott 12 yard punt return (Marshall Koehn kick)	Iowa 24–7
3	1:44	Nebraska	Taariq Allen 34 yard pass from Tommy Armstrong (Drew Brown kick)	Iowa 24–14
4	13:24	Nebraska	Kenny Bell 32 yard pass from Tommy Armstrong (Drew Brown kick)	Iowa 24–21
4	12:06	Nebraska	De'Mornay Pierson-El 80 yard punt return (Drew Brown kick)	Nebraska 28–24
4	1:49	Iowa	Jordan Canzeri 5 yard pass from Jake Rudock (Marshall Koehn kick)	Iowa 31–28
4	0:08	Nebraska	Drew Brown 20 yard field goal	31–31
OT	0:00	Iowa	Marshall Koehn 25 yard field goal	Iowa 34–31
OT	0:00	Nebraska	Kenny Bell 9 yard pass from Tommy Armstrong	Nebraska 37–34

Kenny Bell caught a 9-yard TD pass in overtime as Nebraska rallied to beat Iowa 37–34 in the Heroes Game on Black Friday. The Huskers trailed at one point 24–7 before starting their comeback. The game featured turnovers, big special teams play and stretches of solid defense. Nebraska improves to 3–1 against Iowa since joining the Big Ten and 29–13–3 overall.

Iowa game starters

Position	Player
Quarterback	Tommy Armstrong
Running back	Ameer Abdullah
Wide receiver	Kenny Bell
Wide receiver	De'mornay Pierson-El
Wide receiver	Jordan Westerkamp
Tight end	Cethan Carter
Left tackle	Alex Lewis
Left guard	Jake Cotton
Center	Ryne Reeves
Right guard	Mike Moudy
Right tackle	Givens Price

Position	Player
Defensive end	Greg Mcmullen
Defensive tackle	Maliek Collins
Defensive tackle	Vincent Valentine
Defensive end	Jack Gangwish
Linebacker	David Santos
Linebacker	Trevor Roach
Linebacker	Zaire Anderson
Cornerback	Daniel Davie
Free safety	Byerson Cockrell
Strong safety	Nate Gerry
Cornerback	Josh Mitchell

=== Holiday Bowl ===
Nebraska vs. USC

Team	1	2	3	4	Total
#25 Nebraska	17	0	17	8	42
• #24 USC	10	14	21	0	45

- Date: December 27
- Location: Qualcomm Stadium, San Diego, CA
- Game start: 7:10 p.m. CST
- Elapsed time: 3:55
- Game attendance: 55,789
- Game weather: 57 degrees, Clear, Wind NNW @ 8 mph (13 km/h)
- Referee: Randy Christal
- TV announcers (ESPN/ESPN Radio): Rece Davis, Jesse Palmer, David Pollack, Samantha Ponder/Bill Rosinski, David Norrie, Joe Schad

Scoring summary
1	11:05	Nebraska	Drew Brown 34 yard field goal	Nebraska 3–0
1	10:54	USC	Adoree Jackson 98 yard kickoff return (Andre Heidari kick)	USC 7–3
1	8:23	Nebraska	Kenny Bell 18 yard pass from Tommy Armstrong (Drew Brown kick)	Nebraska 10–7
1	6:05	USC	Andre Heidari 42 yard field goal	10–10
1	1:25	Nebraska	De'Mornay Pierson-El 9 yard pass from Tommy Armstrong (Drew Brown kick)	Nebraska 17–10
2	13:11	USC	Nelson Agholor 17 yard pass from Cody Kessler (Andre Heidari kick)	17–17
2	6:39	USC	Javorius Allen 2 yard run (Andre Heidari kick)	USC 24–17
3	12:01	USC	Adoree Jackson 71 yard pass from Cody Kessler (Andrew Heidari kick)	USC 31–17
3	9:41	Nebraska	Ameer Abdullah 20 yard run (Drew Brown kick)	USC 31–24
3	8:06	USC	Javorius Allen 44 yard run (Andre Heidari kick)	USC 38–24
3	2:28	Nebraska	Drew Brown 24 yard field goal	USC 38–27
3	2:03	USC	Bryce Dixon 20 yard pass from Cody Kessler (Andre Heidari kick)	USC 45–27
3	0:24	Nebraska	Jordan Westerkamp 65 yard pass from Tommy Armstrong (Drew Brown kick)	USC 45–34
4	6:52	Nebraska	Tommy Armstrong 15 yard run (Kenny Bell pass from Tommy Armstrong)	USC 45–42

Nebraska traveled to San Diego to take on the USC Trojans in the Holiday Bowl. This was the fifth all-time meeting with the Trojans, but the Huskers have never won in this series, with USC leading all-time 0–3–1 before the game. The Huskers nearly came back from an 18-point second half deficit, but the Trojans prevailed 45–42. Nebraska was led by interim-coach Barney Cotton in this contest.

USC game starters

Position	Player
Quarterback	Tommy Armstrong
Running back	Ameer Abdullah
Wide receiver	Kenny Bell
Wide receiver	De'mornay Pierson-El
Wide receiver	Jordan Westerkamp
Tight end	Cethan Carter
Left tackle	Alex Lewis
Left guard	Jake Cotton
Center	Dylan Utter
Right guard	Mike Moudy
Right tackle	Givens Price

Position	Player
Defensive end	Greg Mcmullen
Defensive tackle	Maliek Collins
Defensive tackle	Vincent Valentine
Defensive end	Randy Gregory
Linebacker	Josh Banderas
Linebacker	Zaire Anderson
Cornerback	Daniel Davie
Free safety	Corey Cooper
Strong safety	Nate Gerry
Cornerback	Josh Mitchell
Nickelback	Byerson Cockrell

== Big Ten Players of the Week ==
- Week 1: Ameer Abdullah (offensive player of the week)
- Week 2: Sam Foltz (special teams player of the week)
- Week 3: De'Mornay Pierson-El (special teams player of the week)
- Week 4: Ameer Abdullah (co-offensive Player of the Week)
- Week 5: Ameer Abdullah (offensive player of the week)
- Week 9: Ameer Abdullah (offensive player of the week)
- Week 14: Nate Gerry (defensive player of the week)
- Week 14: De'Mornay Pierson-El (Co-Special Teams Player of the Week)

== All-Conference honors ==
2014 Big Ten All-Conference honors:

Coaches
Position	Player
First team offense
WR	Kenny Bell
First team defense
DL	Randy Gregory
Second team offense
RB	Ameer Abdullah
Second team defense
DL	Maliek Collins
Honorable mention
LB	Zaire Anderson
OL	Jake Cotton
P	Sam Foltz
DB	Nate Gerry
OL	Alex Lewis
DB	Josh Mitchell

Media
Position	Player
First team defense
DL	Randy Gregory
Second team offense
RB	Ameer Abdullah
Second team defense
DB	Nate Gerry
Honorable mention
LB	Zaire Anderson
WR	Kenny Bell
DL	Maliek Collins
DB	Corey Cooper
OL	Jake Cotton
OL	Alex Lewis
DB	Josh Mitchell

== All-Americans ==
All-America Teams:

RB – Ameer Abdullah (CBS Sports – 2nd Team | Walter Camp – 2nd Team | Athlon Sports – 2nd Team | AP – 2nd Team | Scout – 2nd Team | SI – 2nd Team | Phil Steele – 3rd Team)

RET – De'Mornay Pierson-El (USA Today – 2nd Team | Athlon Sports – 3rd Team | SI – 2nd Team | Sporting News – 2nd Team | FWAA – 2nd Team | Phil Steele – 2nd Team)

DE – Randy Gregory (AP – 3rd Team | FWAA – 2nd Team | Phil Steele – 2nd Team)

== NFL draft ==
- Ameer Abdullah (2nd round, 54th pick, Detroit Lions)
- Randy Gregory (2nd round, 60th pick, Dallas Cowboys)
- Kenny Bell (5th round, 162nd pick, Tampa Bay Buccaneers)

== Rankings ==
Ranking movements Legend: ██ Increase in ranking ██ Decrease in ranking — = Not ranked RV = Received votes
	Week																
Poll	Pre	1	2	3	4	5	6	7	8	9	10	11	12	13	14	15	Final
AP	22	19	RV	24	21	19	21	19	16	17	15	11	21	RV	25	25	RV
Coaches	22	18	21	22	19	17	21	19	16	16	14	11	19	RV	23	22	RV
CFP	Not released									15	13	16	23	—	—	—	Not released
