= 2014 Ohio State Buckeyes football team =

American college football season

2014 Ohio State Buckeyes football

Consensus national champion Sugar Bowl champion Big Ten champion Big Ten East Division champion

Big Ten Championship, W 59–0 vs. Wisconsin

Sugar Bowl (CFP Semifinal) W 42–35 vs. Alabama CFP National Championship W 42–20 vs. Oregon
- Conference: Big Ten Conference
- East Division

Ranking
- Coaches: No. 1
- AP: No. 1
- Record: 14–1 (8–0 Big Ten)
- Head coach: Urban Meyer (3rd season)
- Offensive coordinator: Tom Herman (3rd season)
- Co-offensive coordinator: Ed Warinner (3rd season)
- Offensive scheme: Power spread
- Co-defensive coordinators: Luke Fickell (9th season); Chris Ash (1st season)
- Base defense: 4–3
- Captain: 5: Michael Bennett; Curtis Grant; Doran Grant; Jeff Heuerman; Braxton Miller
- Home stadium: Ohio Stadium

2014 Big Ten Conference football standings
	Conf.			Overall
Team	W		L	W		L
East Division
No. 1 Ohio State x$#^	8	–	0	14	–	1
No. T–5 Michigan State	7	–	1	11	–	2
Maryland	4	–	4	7	–	6
Rutgers	3	–	5	8	–	5
Michigan	3	–	5	5	–	7
Penn State	2	–	6	7	–	6
Indiana	1	–	7	4	–	8
West Division
No. 13 Wisconsin x	7	–	1	11	–	3
Minnesota	5	–	3	8	–	5
Nebraska	5	–	3	9	–	4
Iowa	4	–	4	7	–	6
Illinois	3	–	5	6	–	7
Northwestern	3	–	5	5	–	7
Purdue	1	–	7	3	–	9
Championship: Ohio State 59, Wisconsin 0
# – College Football Playoff champion; ^ – College Football Playoff participant; $ – Conference champion; x – Division champion/co-champions; Rankings from AP Poll

The 2014 Ohio State Buckeyes football team represented Ohio State University in the 2014 NCAA Division I FBS football season. It was the Buckeyes' 125th overall, the 102nd as a member of the Big Ten Conference, and first season as a member of the newly reorganized Eastern Division. The team was led by Urban Meyer, in his third year as head coach, and played their home games at Ohio Stadium in Columbus, Ohio. They finished the season with 14 wins and 1 loss (14–1 overall, 8–0 in the Big Ten), as Big Ten champions and as national champions after they defeated Oregon in the inaugural College Football Playoff National Championship Game. Winning 14 games in a season tied the school record set by the Buckeyes' previous national champion team, a record that would be matched by the program's next national champion team.

After a 12–2 season the previous year, Ohio State signed a highly ranked recruiting class and entered the season ranked No. 5 in the AP poll and No. 6 in the coaches' preseason poll. In the second game of the season, Ohio State was upset by Virginia Tech, 35–21. Following the loss, Ohio State won five consecutive games, including four against Big Ten opponents. In the ninth game of the season, Ohio State defeated Michigan State in a rematch of the previous year's Big Ten Championship Game. After the 49–37 win over the Spartans, the Buckeyes moved into the top ten in all major polls. After a 42–28 win over rival Michigan, Ohio State completed their third consecutive undefeated Big Ten regular season, and earned their second consecutive berth in the Big Ten Championship Game, where they defeated Wisconsin 59–0. In the first season of the College Football Playoff, Ohio State was selected as the No. 4 team, where they defeated Alabama in the Sugar Bowl 42–35. The win advanced the Buckeyes to the 2015 College Football Playoff National Championship Game, where they defeated Oregon 42–20 to capture the 2014 national championship. They were voted consensus national champions as the Associated Press (AP) and the Coaches' Poll (AFCA) both named them the No. 1 team in their final polls.

Reigning two-time Big Ten Offensive Player of the Year Braxton Miller was set to be Ohio State's starting quarterback for the year, but he sustained a season-ending shoulder injury in practice just a few weeks before the start of the season. Redshirt freshman J. T. Barrett started at quarterback for the majority of the season, until he, too, suffered a season-ending injury via a broken ankle during the regular season finale against Michigan. Redshirt sophomore Cardale Jones, who was the third-string quarterback at the start of the summer, led the Buckeyes to wins in the Big Ten Championship Game, Sugar Bowl, and CFP National Championship in his first three career starts at quarterback.

Defensive end Joey Bosa led the Big Ten in sacks, tackles for loss, and forced fumbles, and was named Big Ten Defensive Player of the Year. Bosa was named a unanimous first-team All-American. Bosa, Barrett, offensive lineman Pat Elflein, and defensive back Doran Grant earned first-team all-conference honors.

== Before the season ==
=== Returning starters ===
==== Offense ====
Player	Class	Position
Evan Spencer	Senior	Wide Receiver
Jeff Heuerman	Senior	Tight End
Taylor Decker	Junior	Tackle

==== Defense ====
Player	Class	Position
Noah Spence	Junior	Defensive line
Michael Bennett	Senior	Defensive line
Adolphus Washington	Junior	Defensive line
Joey Bosa	Sophomore	Defensive line
Joshua Perry	Junior	Linebacker
Doran Grant	Senior	Cornerback
Tyvis Powell	Sophomore	Safety

==== Special teams ====
Player	Class	Position
Cameron Johnston	Sophomore	Punter

=== Coaching staff ===
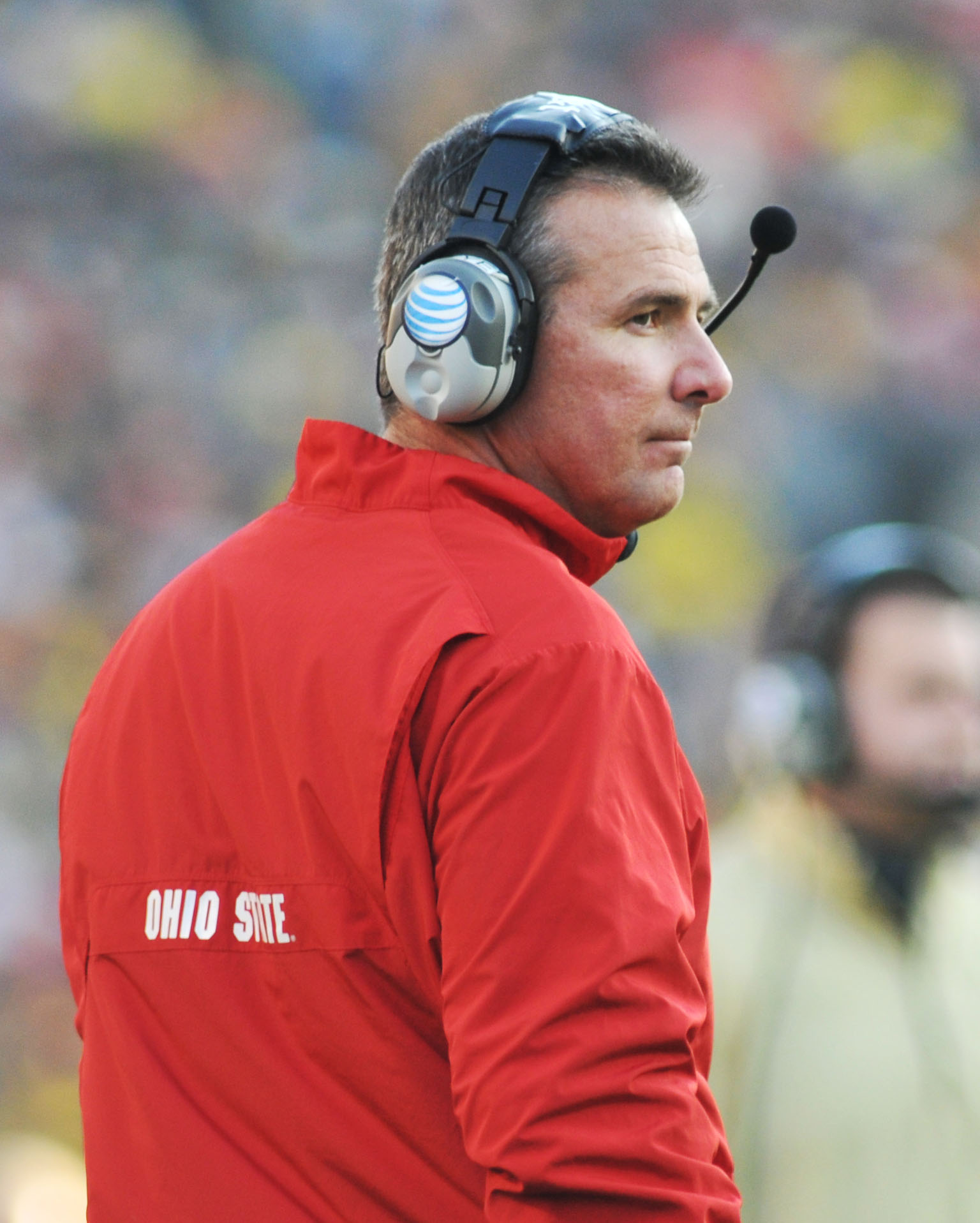
Head coach Urban Meyer

Urban Meyer was in his third year as the Buckeyes' head coach during the 2014 season. In his previous two seasons with Ohio State, he led the Buckeyes to an overall record of 24 wins and 2 losses (24–2), while also winning the Big Ten Leaders Division championship in those two seasons. On December 21, 2013, co-defensive coordinator Everett Withers accepted the head coaching position at James Madison. On January 23, 2014, Ohio State announced the hiring of Chris Ash to replace Withers as co-defensive coordinator, along with being named the safeties coach. Defensive line coach Mike Vrabel also left the Ohio State staff following the 2013 season to accept a coaching position with the Houston Texans. On January 15, 2014, former Penn State coach Larry Johnson was brought onto the Ohio State staff as the defensive line and assistant head coach.

== Coaching staff ==
- Urban Meyer – Head Coach (3rd year)

Offense

- Tom Herman – Offensive Coordinator / Quarterbacks
- Stan Drayton – Assistant Head Coach / Running Backs (3rd year)
- Tim Hinton – Tight Ends / Fullbacks (3rd year)
- Zack Smith – Wide Receivers (3rd year)
- Ed Warinner – Co-Offensive Coordinator / Offensive Line (3rd year)

Defense

- Luke Fickell – Defensive Coordinator / Linebackers (13th year)
- Chris Ash – Co-Defensive Coordinator / Safeties (1st year)
- Kerry Coombs– Cornerbacks / Special Teams (3rd year)
- Larry Johnson – Assistant Head Coach / Defensive Line (1st year)

Strength and Conditioning

- Mickey Marotti – Strength Coach (3rd year)
- Scott Ray- Assistant Strength and Conditioning coach
- Anthony Schlegel -Assistant Strength and Conditioning coach

=== Recruiting class ===
Prior to National Signing Day on February 6, 2014, seven high school players of the 2014 recruiting class enrolled for the spring semester in order to participate in spring practice. These early enrollments included: quarterback Stephen Collier, wide receivers Johnnie Dixon and Curtis Samuel, offensive linemen Marcelys Jones and Kyle Trout, linebacker Raekwon McMillan, and kicker Sean Nuernberger.

Ohio State's recruiting class was highlighted by eleven players from the "ESPN 300", including five from the top 100: No. 13 Raekwon McMillan (inside linebacker); No. 34 Johnnie Dixon (wide receiver); No. 45 Marshon Lattimore (cornerback); No. 58 Damon Webb (cornerback); and No. 74 Jamarco Jones (offensive tackle). The Buckeyes signed the No. 3 recruiting class according to Rivals.com and 247Sports.com, the No. 5 recruiting class according to Scout.com, and the No. 7 recruiting class according to ESPN.

College recruiting (2014)
Name	Hometown	School	Height	Weight	40^{‡}	Commit date
Kyle Berger; LB	Cleveland, Ohio	Saint Ignatius High School	6 ft 2 in (1.88 m)	222 lb (101 kg)	–	Apr 8, 2013
Kyle Berger; LB	Recruit ratings: Scout: Rivals: 247Sports: ESPN:					
Dante Booker; LB	Akron, Ohio	St. Vincent–St. Mary High School	6 ft 3 in (1.91 m)	210 lb (95 kg)	4.7	May 23, 2013
Dante Booker; LB	Recruit ratings: Scout: Rivals: 247Sports: ESPN:					
Noah Brown; WR	Sparta, New Jersey	Pope John XXIII High School	6 ft 2 in (1.88 m)	211 lb (96 kg)	–	Sep 9, 2013
Noah Brown; WR	Recruit ratings: Scout: Rivals: 247Sports: ESPN:					
Parris Campbell; RB	Akron, Ohio	St. Vincent–St. Mary High School	6 ft 0 in (1.83 m)	181 lb (82 kg)	4.4	Feb 10, 2013
Parris Campbell; RB	Recruit ratings: Scout: Rivals: 247Sports: ESPN:					
Stephen Collier; QB	Leesburg, Georgia	Lee County High School	6 ft 3 in (1.91 m)	206 lb (93 kg)	–	Jun 21, 2013
Stephen Collier; QB	Recruit ratings: Scout: Rivals: 247Sports: ESPN:					
Johnnie Dixon; WR	West Palm Beach, Florida	Dwyer High School	6 ft 0 in (1.83 m)	175 lb (79 kg)	–	Dec 17, 2013
Johnnie Dixon; WR	Recruit ratings: Scout: Rivals: 247Sports: ESPN:					
Jalyn Holmes; DE	Norfolk, Virginia	Lake Taylor High School	6 ft 5 in (1.96 m)	235 lb (107 kg)	–	Jun 20, 2013
Jalyn Holmes; DE	Recruit ratings: Scout: Rivals: 247Sports: ESPN:					
Malik Hooker; DB	New Castle, Pennsylvania	New Castle Senior High School	6 ft 2 in (1.88 m)	183 lb (83 kg)	–	Jul 29, 2013
Malik Hooker; DB	Recruit ratings: Scout: Rivals: 247Sports: ESPN:					
Sam Hubbard; LB	Cincinnati, Ohio	Moeller High School	6 ft 6 in (1.98 m)	223 lb (101 kg)	–	Jul 29, 2013
Sam Hubbard; LB	Recruit ratings: Scout: Rivals: 247Sports: ESPN:					
Jamarco Jones; OL	Chicago, Illinois	De La Salle Institute	6 ft 5 in (1.96 m)	295 lb (134 kg)	–	Jun 27, 2013
Jamarco Jones; OL	Recruit ratings: Scout: Rivals: 247Sports: ESPN:					
Marcelys Jones; OL	Glenville, Ohio	Glenville High School	6 ft 4 in (1.93 m)	354 lb (161 kg)	–	Dec 25, 2012
Marcelys Jones; OL	Recruit ratings: Scout: Rivals: 247Sports: ESPN:					
Demetrius Knox; OL	Fort Worth, Texas	All Saints Episcopal School	6 ft 4 in (1.93 m)	287 lb (130 kg)	5.3	Jul 28, 2013
Demetrius Knox; OL	Recruit ratings: Scout: Rivals: 247Sports: ESPN:					
Marshon Lattimore; CB	Glenville, Ohio	Glenville High School	6 ft 0 in (1.83 m)	185 lb (84 kg)	–	Jan 4, 2014
Marshon Lattimore; CB	Recruit ratings: Scout: Rivals: 247Sports: ESPN:					
Terry McLaurin; WR	Indianapolis, Indiana	Cathedral High School	6 ft 0 in (1.83 m)	175 lb (79 kg)	4.4	Jun 23, 2013
Terry McLaurin; WR	Recruit ratings: Scout: Rivals: 247Sports: ESPN:					
Raekwon McMillan; LB	Hinesville, Georgia	Liberty County High School	6 ft 3 in (1.91 m)	235 lb (107 kg)	4.7	Dec 16, 2013
Raekwon McMillan; LB	Recruit ratings: Scout: Rivals: 247Sports: ESPN:					
Sean Nuernberger; K	Buckner, Kentucky	Oldham County High School	6 ft 2 in (1.88 m)	230 lb (100 kg)	–	Jun 14, 2013
Sean Nuernberger; K	Recruit ratings: Scout: Rivals: 247Sports: ESPN:					
Curtis Samuel; WR	Brooklyn, New York	Erasmus Hall High School	5 ft 11 in (1.80 m)	180 lb (82 kg)	4.4	Aug 16, 2013
Curtis Samuel; WR	Recruit ratings: Scout: Rivals: 247Sports: ESPN:					
Darius Slade; DE	Montclair, New Jersey	Montclair High School	6 ft 5 in (1.96 m)	237 lb (108 kg)	–	Feb 5, 2014
Darius Slade; DE	Recruit ratings: Scout: Rivals: 247Sports: ESPN:					
Erick Smith; DB	Cleveland, Ohio	Glenville High School	6 ft 0 in (1.83 m)	181 lb (82 kg)	–	Jan 4, 2014
Erick Smith; DB	Recruit ratings: Scout: Rivals: 247Sports: ESPN:					
Brady Taylor; OL	Columbus, Ohio	Bishop Ready High School	6 ft 5 in (1.96 m)	280 lb (130 kg)	5.0	Jan 20, 2014
Brady Taylor; OL	Recruit ratings: Scout: Rivals: 247Sports: ESPN:					
Dylan Thompson; DE	Lombard, Illinois	Montini Catholic High School	6 ft 4 in (1.93 m)	271 lb (123 kg)	–	Mar 23, 2014
Dylan Thompson; DE	Recruit ratings: Scout: Rivals: 247Sports: ESPN:					
Kyle Trout; OL	Lancaster, Ohio	Lancaster High School	6 ft 6 in (1.98 m)	280 lb (130 kg)	–	Feb 10, 2013
Kyle Trout; OL	Recruit ratings: Scout: Rivals: 247Sports: ESPN:					
Damon Webb; DB	Detroit, Michigan	Cass Technical High School	5 ft 11 in (1.80 m)	177 lb (80 kg)	–	Jan 13, 2013
Damon Webb; DB	Recruit ratings: Scout: Rivals: 247Sports: ESPN:					
Overall recruit ranking: Scout: 5 Rivals: 3 247Sports: 3 ESPN: 7
‡ Refers to 40-yard dash; Note: In many cases, Scout, Rivals, 247Sports, On3, and ESPN may conflict in their listings of height, weight and 40 time.; In these cases, the average was taken. ESPN grades are on a 100-point scale.; Sources: "Ohio State Signee List 2014". Rivals.; "Scout.com Football Recruiting: Ohio State". Scout.; "2014 Player Signees – Ohio State". ESPN.; "Scout.com Team Recruiting Rankings". Scout.; "2014 Team Ranking". Rivals.com.

=== Spring practice ===
Spring Game

Team	1	2	3	4	Total
• Gray	3	7	0	7	17
Scarlet	7	0	0	0	7

- Date: April 12
- Location: Columbus, Ohio
- Game start: 1:30 p.m.
- Elapsed time: 2:01
- Game attendance: 61,058
- Game weather: Mostly Sunny, 73 °F (23 °C), Wind: S 17 MPH
- Referee: Ron Snodgrass
- TV announcers (BTN): Tom Werme (play-by-play), Glen Mason (color)

Scoring summary
1	7:34	Scarlet	Rashad Frazier fumble recover (team kick)	Scarlet 7–0
1	3:11	Gray	Sean Nuernberger 43-yard field goal	Scarlet 7–3
2	7:36	Gray	Bri'onte Dunn 2-yard run (Kyle Clinton kick)	Gray 10–7
4	4:30	Gray	Warren Ball 3-yard run (Kyle Clinton kick)	Scarlet 17–7

Ohio State's spring practice began on March 4 and consisted of fifteen separate practice sessions, which culminated with the spring game on April 12. Following a shoulder surgery on February 21, quarterback Braxton Miller was limited in practice, while receiver Evan Spencer, still rehabilitating from an injury during the previous season, did not participate in any spring practice drills. The spring game was broadcast on the Big Ten Network and returned to Ohio Stadium, after being played at Paul Brown Stadium in Cincinnati, Ohio in the previous season.

As done in previous seasons, the Buckeyes were divided up into two teams, with the Gray team defeating the Scarlet team 17–7 in the annual spring game. The game opened with the Scarlet team receiving the ball and were forced to punt after six plays. On the opening offensive play for the Gray team, Rashad Frazier sacked freshman quarterback J. T. Barrett and forced a fumble, which was returned for a touchdown, giving the Scarlet team a 7–0 lead. The Gray team closed the gap later in the first quarter with a 43-yard field goal from Sean Nuernberger. A fifteen-play, 80-yard drive to start the second quarter by the Gray team resulted in a 2-yard touchdown run from Bri'onte Dunn and gave the Gray team the lead at 10–7. A 3-yard touchdown run from Warren Ball in the fourth quarter gave the Gray team the ten-point advantage while also being the last scoring play of the game.

Starting quarterback Braxton Miller did not compete in the game. J. T. led the Gray team in passing, completing 17 of 33 passes for 151 yards, while Cardale Jones led the Scarlet team in passing after completing 14 of 31 pass attempts for 126 yards. Warren Ball was the overall rushing leader with 55 yards on eight attempts, including one touchdown. Chris Worley led both teams in defensive stats with six solo tackles.

=== Fall camp ===
Seven separate Ohio State players were on the preseason awards watch lists in eleven different award categories. These included Michael Bennett and Joey Bosa for the Bednarik Award, Bronko Nagurski Trophy and Lombardi Award; Bennett for the Outland Trophy; Devin Smith for the Biletnikoff Award; Curtis Grant for the Butkus Award; Braxton Miller for the Davey O'Brien Award, Maxwell Award and Walter Camp Award; Jeff Heuerman for the Mackey Award; as well as Cameron Johnston for the Ray Guy Award. Ohio State opened their fall camp on August 4. On August 19, it was announced that quarterback Braxton Miller, who had surgery on his throwing shoulder in February 2014, would miss the entire season, after re-injuring his shoulder during camp.

== Personnel ==
2014 Ohio State Buckeyes football team roster
Players
Coaches
Offense

Pos.	#	Name	Class
OT	76	Darryl Baldwin	Sr
RB	28	Warren Ball	So
QB	16	J. T. Barrett (injured)	Fr
TE	85	Marcus Baugh	Fr
C	50	Jacoby Boren	Jr
WR	80	Noah Brown	Fr
OL	55	Tommy Brown	Jr
RB	26	Devonte Butler	So
WR	21	Parris Campbell	Fr
WR	82	James Clark	Fr
QB	13	Stephen Collier	Fr
OT	68	Taylor Decker	Jr
WR	1	Johnny Dixon	Fr
OL	66	Kyle Dodson	So
RB	25	Bri'onte Dunn	So
G	65	Pat Elflein	So
RB	15	Ezekiel Elliott	So
WR	33	Frank Epitropoulos	So
OL	61	Logan Gaskey	So
WR	89	Jeff Greene	Sr
WR	87	Peter Gwilym	Sr
OL	51	Joel Hale	Sr
TE	86	Jeff Heuerman	Sr
TE	46	Devin Hill	Sr
TE	88	Sam Hubbard	Fr
QB	12	Cardale Jones	So
OL	74	Jamarco Jones	Fr
OL	64	Marcelys Jones	Fr
OL	78	Demetrius Knox	Fr
RB	29	Caleb Laps	So
OL	56	Chad Lindsay	Sr
OL	75	Evan Lisle	Fr
H–B	17	Jalin Marshall	Fr
WR	20	Devlin McDaniel	So
WR	83	Terry McLaurin	Fr
QB	5	Braxton Miller (injured)	Sr
WR	18	Kato Mitchell	Jr
TE	8	J. T. Moore	Sr
QB	15	Luke Morgan	So
C, G	54	Billy Price	Fr
WR	19	Joe Ramstetter	So
TE	44	Chris Rock	Jr
RB	4	Curtis Samuel	Fr
WR	84	Corey Smith	Jr
WR	9	Devin Smith	Sr
RB	7	Rod Smith	Sr
WR	6	Evan Spencer	Sr
OL	79	Brady Taylor	Fr
WR	3	Michael Thomas	So
OL	71	Kyle Trout	Fr
OL	73	Antonio Underwood	Jr
TE	81	Nick Vannett	Jr
H–B	2	Dontre Wilson	So

Defense

Pos.	#	Name	Class
CB	13	Eli Apple	Fr
S	11	Vonn Bell	So
DT	63	Michael Bennett	Sr
LB	44	Kyle Berger	Fr
LB	30	Devan Bogard	Jr
LB	33	Dante Booker	Fr
DL	97	Joey Bosa	So
LB	48	Joe Burger	Jr
S	16	Cam Burrows	So
DL	72	Chris Carter	Jr
S	28	Michael Cibene	So
CB	19	Gareon Conley	Fr
S	32	Russell Doup	Sr
LB	38	Craig Fada	Jr
S	3	Khaleed Franklin	So
DL	17	Rashad Frazier	Sr
LB	14	Curtis Grant	Sr
CB	12	Doran Grant	Sr
DL	77	Michael Hill	Fr
DL	98	John Holman	Sr
DL	10	Jalyn Holmes	Fr
S	24	Malik Hooker	Fr
LB	36	Trey Johnson	So
DL	53	Kosta Karageorge	Sr
CB	2	Marshon Lattimore	Fr
LB	43	Darron Lee	So
DL	59	Tyquan Lewis	Fr
LB	5	Raekwon McMillan	Fr
DL	88	Steve Miller	Sr
DL	52	Donovan Munger	Fr
S	25	Kevin Niehoff	Jr
DL	91	Aaron Parry	So
LB	37	Joshua Perry	Jr
S	23	Tyvis Powell	So
CB	26	Armani Reeves	Jr
CB	18	Nik Sarac	Sr
DL	90	Tommy Schutt	Jr
DL	42	Darius Slade	Fr
S	1	Erick Smith	Fr
LB	46	Nick Snyder	Jr
DE	8	Noah Spence	Jr
S	20	Ron Tanner	Jr
DL	94	Dylan Thompson	Fr
DL	92	Adolphus Washington	Jr
CB	7	Damon Webb	Fr
LB	55	Cam Williams	Jr
LB	35	Chris Worley	Fr

Special teams

Pos.	#	Name	Class
PK	39	Kyle Clinton	Sr
LS	41	Bryce Haynes	Jr
P	95	Cameron Johnston	So
LS	42	Aaron Mawhirter	So
PK	96	Sean Nuernberger	Fr
P	14	Jake Russell	Jr
PK	9	Tim Scott	Sr

Head coach

- Urban Meyer

Coordinators/assistant coaches

- Chris Ash
- Jon Carpenter
- Kerry Coombs
- Stan Drayton
- Luke Fickell
- Cody Hawkins
- Tom Herman
- Tim Hinton
- Larry Johnson
- Adrian Mayes
- Mickey Marotti
- Vince Oghobaase
- Anthony Schlegel
- Zach Smith
- Quinn Tempel
- Ed Warinner

Legend

- (C) Team captain
- (S) Suspended
- (I) Ineligible
- Injured
- Redshirt

Roster
Last update: 2016-Jan-26

=== Depth chart ===
Starters and backups.

Defense

FS
11 Vonn Bell
16 Cam Burrows

WLB	MLB	SLB
37 Joshua Perry	14 Curtis Grant	43 Darron Lee
55 Cam Williams	5 Raekwon McMillan	38 Craig Fada

SS
23 Tyvis Powell
20 Ron Tanner

CB
13 Eli Apple
19 Gareon Conley

DE	DT	DT	DE
97 Joey Bosa	63 Michael Bennett	92 Adolphus Washington	88 Steve Miller
59 Tyquan Lewis	90 Tommy Schutt	72 Chris Carter	17 Rashad Frazier

CB
12 Doran Grant
26 Armani Reeves

Offense

WR
3 Michael Thomas
6 Evan Spencer

WR
17 Jalin Marshall
2 Dontre Wilson

LT	LG	C	RG	RT
68 Taylor Decker	54 Billy Price	50 Jacoby Boren	65 Pat Elflein	76 Darryl Baldwin
74 Jamarco Jones	51 Joel Hale	73 Antonio Underwood	57 Chase Farris	57 Chase Farris

WR
5 Jeff Heuerman (TE)
81 Nick Vannett (TE)

WR
9 Devin Smith
84 Corey Smith

QB
16 J. T. Barrett
12 Cardale Jones

RB
15 Ezekiel Elliott
4 Curtis Samuel

Special teams
PK 97 Sean Nuernberger
P 95 Cameron Johnston
KR Dontre Wilson
Curtis Samuel
PR Jalin Marshall
Dontre Wilson
LS 41 Bryce Haynes
H Cameron Johnston

== Schedule ==
The Big Ten Conference released the schedule for the 2014 season on May 16, 2013. With the addition of Maryland and Rutgers, the Big Ten abandoned its previous format to accommodate expansion. As a result, Ohio State faced all six Eastern Division opponents Indiana, Maryland, Michigan, Michigan State, Penn State and Rutgers. Ohio State also faced two Western Division opponents: rival Illinois and Minnesota. Ohio State played four non-conference games: Navy, an FBS Independent, Kent State of the Mid-American Conference, Virginia Tech of the Atlantic Coast Conference, and Cincinnati of the American Athletic Conference. Ohio State had two bye weeks during the season, the first between their games against Kent State and Cincinnati and their second between their games against Maryland and Rutgers. Following their win over Indiana, Ohio State won the Big Ten East Division championship and qualified to play in the Big Ten Championship Game against Wisconsin, whom they defeated 59–0. Ohio State was selected to participate in the inaugural College Football Playoff, as the fourth ranked team, and faced top ranked Alabama in the Sugar Bowl, whom they defeated 42–35. Following their Sugar Bowl victory, the Buckeyes advanced to face second ranked Oregon in the CFP National Championship Game, whom they defeated 42–20. The ranking in parentheses below are the rankings from the College Football Playoff selection committee.

All games during the 2014 season were broadcast on the Ohio State Football Radio Network. Paul Keels headed the crew with play-by-play, Jim Lachey with color commentary, Marty Bannister as sideline and locker room reporter, and Skip Mosic as the pre-game and halftime show host.

Date	Time	Opponent	Rank	Site	TV	Result	Attendance
August 30	12:00 p.m.	vs. Navy*	No. 5	M&T Bank Stadium; Baltimore, MD	CBSSN	W 34–17	57,579
September 6	8:00 p.m.	Virginia Tech*	No. 8	Ohio Stadium; Columbus, OH	ESPN	L 21–35	107,517
September 13	12:00 p.m.	Kent State*	No. 22	Ohio Stadium; Columbus, OH	ABC/ESPN2	W 66–0	104,404
September 27	6:00 p.m.	Cincinnati*	No. 22	Ohio Stadium; Columbus, OH	BTN	W 50–28	108,362
October 4	12:00 p.m.	at Maryland	No. 20	Byrd Stadium; College Park, MD	ABC	W 52–24	51,802
October 18	3:30 p.m.	Rutgers^{†}	No. 13	Ohio Stadium; Columbus, OH	ABC/ESPN2	W 56–17	106,795
October 25	8:00 p.m.	at Penn State	No. 13	Beaver Stadium; University Park, PA (rivalry)	ABC	W 31–24 ^{2OT}	107,895
November 1	8:00 p.m.	Illinois	No. 16	Ohio Stadium; Columbus, OH (Illibuck Trophy)	ABC	W 55–14	106,961
November 8	8:00 p.m.	at No. 8 Michigan State	No. 14	Spartan Stadium; East Lansing, MI (College GameDay)	ABC	W 49–37	76,409
November 15	12:00 p.m.	at No. 25 Minnesota	No. 8	TCF Bank Stadium; Minneapolis, MN	ABC	W 31–24	45,778
November 22	12:00 p.m.	Indiana	No. 6	Ohio Stadium; Columbus, OH	BTN	W 42–27	101,426
November 29	12:00 p.m.	Michigan	No. 6	Ohio Stadium; Columbus, OH (rivalry)	ABC	W 42–28	108,610
December 6	8:15 p.m.	vs. No. 13 Wisconsin	No. 5	Lucas Oil Stadium; Indianapolis, IN (Big Ten Championship Game)	FOX	W 59–0	60,229
January 1, 2015	9:00 p.m.	vs. No. 1 Alabama*	No. 4	Mercedes-Benz Superdome; New Orleans, LA (Sugar Bowl–CFP Semifinal, SEC Nation)	ESPN	W 42–35	74,682
January 12, 2015	8:30 p.m.	vs. No. 2 Oregon*	No. 4	AT&T Stadium; Arlington, TX (CFP National Championship, College GameDay)	ESPN	W 42–20	85,689
*Non-conference game; ^{†}Homecoming; Rankings from AP Poll and CFP Rankings (after October 28) released prior to game; All times are in Eastern time

== Game summaries ==
=== Navy ===
Team	1	2	3	4	Total
• #5 Ohio State	3	3	14	14	34
Navy	0	7	7	3	17

- Location: Baltimore, Maryland
- Game start: 12:00 p.m.
- Elapsed time: 3:19
- Game attendance: 57,579
- Game weather: 74°, cloudy, winds SE 7 mph
- Referee: Mike Cannon
- TV announcers (CBSSN): Verne Lundquist (play-by-play), Gary Danielson (color), Allie LaForce (sideline)

Scoring summary
1	4:26	Ohio State	Sean Nuernberger 46-yard field goal	Ohio State 3–0
2	14:04	Navy	DeBrandon Sanders 1-yard run (Nick Sloan kick)	Navy 7–3
2	2:04	Ohio State	Sean Nuernberger 28-yard field goal	Navy 7–6
3	13:08	Ohio State	Darron Lee 61-yard fumble return (Sean Nuernberger kick)	Ohio State 13–7
3	11:15	Navy	Keenan Reynolds 1-yard run (Nick Sloan kick)	Navy 14–13
3	4:10	Ohio State	Devin Smith 80-yard pass from J. T. Barrett (Sean Nuernberger kick)	Ohio State 20–14
4	13:54	Navy	Nick Sloan 32-yard field goal	Ohio State 20–17
4	8:54	Ohio State	Ezekiel Elliott 10-yard run (Sean Nuernberger kick)	Ohio State 27–17
4	2:09	Ohio State	Michael Thomas 9-yard pass from J. T. Barrett (Sean Nuernberger kick)	Ohio State 34–17

On March 2, 2010, officials from both Ohio State and the United States Naval Academy agreed to a matchup between the Buckeyes and Midshipmen at M&T Bank Stadium. In the game, Ohio State defeated the Midshipmen 34–17.

Redshirt freshman J. T. Barrett started at quarterback for the Buckeyes following a season-ending injury to Braxton Miller during fall camp. Ohio State started the game on offense, with Barrett completing his first pass attempt on the first play of the game; however, the Midshipmen defense would force a punt. Ohio State scored the first points of the day on their second offensive drive with a 46-yard field goal from Sean Nuernberger to give the Buckeyes the 3–0 lead. Navy quarterback Keenan Reynolds drove the Midshipmen 75 yards in eleven plays on their ensuing offensive possession, with the drive resulting in a touchdown run for DeBrandon Sanders, giving Navy a 7–3 lead at the start of the second quarter.

Midway through the second quarter, Barrett threw an interception, ending the Buckeyes' 67-yard drive and pinning Navy deep in their own territory. The Buckeyes' next offensive drive would end in a second field goal from Nuernberger. After a missed field goal from the Midshipmen at the end of the second quarter, Navy went into halftime with a 7–6 lead. Navy received the ball to open the third quarter; however, on the fifth play of the drive, the Midshipmen fumbled the ball, which was returned for a touchdown by Darron Lee and gave Ohio State the lead at 13–7. After a 59-yard kickoff return, Navy ended a 4-play, 84-yard drive with a touchdown from Reynolds, giving Navy the lead again at 14–13. Ohio State responded late in the third quarter with an 80-yard touchdown pass from Barrett to Devin Smith.

A field goal early in the fourth quarter was the last scoring play for the Midshipmen. A 10-yard touchdown run from Ezekiel Elliott on Ohio State's ensuing offensive drive and a touchdown pass from Barrett to Michael Thomas put the Buckeyes well ahead, with the final score being 34–17 in favor of Ohio State. Barrett, who made his first collegiate start, completed 12 of 15 pass attempts for two touchdowns, while also leading the team in rushing with 90 yards. For his achievements, Barrett was recognized as the co-Big Ten Freshman of the Week. With the victory, Ohio State improved their overall record against Navy to 5–0.

=== Virginia Tech ===
Team	1	2	3	4	Total
• Virginia Tech	14	7	0	14	35
#8 Ohio State	7	0	7	7	21

- Location: Columbus, Ohio
- Game start: 8:00 p.m.
- Elapsed time: 3:47
- Game attendance: 107,517
- Game weather: 68°, partly cloudy, winds NW 8 mph
- Referee: Jerry McGinn
- TV announcers (ESPN): Brad Nessler (play-by-play), Todd Blackledge (color), Holly Rowe (sideline)

Scoring summary
1	7:05	Virginia Tech	Shai McKenzie 2-yard run (Joey Slye kick)	Virginia Tech 7–0
1	3:51	Ohio State	J. T. Barrett 2-yard run (Sean Nuernberger kick)	7–7
1	0:19	Virginia Tech	Marshawn Williams 14-yard run (Joey Slye kick)	Virginia Tech 14–7
2	0:52	Virginia Tech	Sam Rogers 10-yard pass from Michael Brewer (Joey Slye kick)	Virginia Tech 21–7
3	3:01	Ohio State	Michael Thomas 53-yard pass from J. T. Barrett (Sean Nuernberger kick)	Virginia Tech 21–14
4	11:40	Ohio State	Ezekiel Elliott 15-yard run (Sean Nuernberger kick)	21–21
4	8:44	Virginia Tech	Bucky Hodges 10-yard pass from Michael Brewer (Joey Slye kick)	Virginia Tech 28–21
4	0:46	Virginia Tech	Donovan Riley 63-yard interception return (Joey Slye kick)	Virginia Tech 35–21

In the first home game of the 2014 season, Ohio State was defeated by the Virginia Tech Hokies in the first meeting between the two schools. Virginia Tech received the ball to open the game, with the Buckeye defense forcing a turnover on an interception thrown by quarterback Michael Brewer to cornerback Eli Apple. After the Hokie defense forced a three and out, they received the ball in Ohio State territory after a 24-yard punt. Virginia Tech took advantage of the field position, driving 43 yards and scoring on a Shai McKenzie touchdown run, giving them a 7–0 lead. J. T. Barrett and the Buckeye offense responded on their next drive, driving 83 yards in seven plays and scoring on a 2-yard run from Barrett. The Hokies' again started near midfield after a big kickoff return and took the lead back, this time on a 14-yard run from Marshawn Williams, giving Virginia Tech a 14–7 lead. After receiving the ball again late in the half, the Hokies extended their lead, scoring on a touchdown pass from Brewer to Sam Rogers, giving Virginia Tech a 21–7 lead at halftime.

The Buckeyes' offense continued to struggle, being forced to punt on their first possession of the second half. Both defenses continued to dominate the game, with Ohio State forcing the Hokies to punt on their next two possessions and Virginia Tech intercepting a pass from Barrett. Ohio State reduced Virginia Tech's lead late in the third quarter on a touchdown pass from Barrett to Michael Thomas. The Buckeye defense forced Brewer into his second interception of the game on their next offensive possession, though Ohio State would be forced to punt. Ohio State again forced a turnover on the Hokies' next possession, this time on a fumble recovery by Rashad Frazier. Two plays later, Ohio State tied the game on a 15-yard run from Ezekiel Elliott. Virginia Tech put together a 6-play, 65-yard drive on their next possession and again scored on a Brewer touchdown pass, giving them a 28–21 lead. After Barrett was sacked twice on their next possession, the Buckeyes were forced to punt and though the Buckeye defense forced a Hokie stop, an interception by Barrett again gave momentum to the Hokies. Another Barrett interception returned for a touchdown with less than a minute remaining in the game, sealed 35–21 the upset victory for Virginia Tech, which also ended Ohio State's 25-game regular season win streak. This is the only game Ohio State scored under 31 points in the 2014 season.

=== Kent State ===
Team	1	2	3	4	Total
Kent State	0	0	0	0	0
• #22 Ohio State	21	24	14	7	66

- Location: Columbus, Ohio
- Game start: 12:00 p.m.
- Elapsed time: 3:24
- Game attendance: 104,404
- Game weather: 59°, partly cloudy, winds N 12 mph
- Referee: John O'Neill
- TV announcers (ABC/ESPN2): Bob Wischusen (play-by-play), Matt Millen (color), Quint Kessenich (sideline)

Scoring summary
1	13:16	Ohio State	Michael Thomas 14-yard pass from J. T. Barrett (Sean Nuernberger kick)	Ohio State 7–0
1	9:30	Ohio State	Rod Smith 8-yard pass from J. T. Barrett (Sean Nuernberger kick)	Ohio State 14–0
1	1:49	Ohio State	Rod Smith 1-yard run (Sean Nuernberger kick)	Ohio State 21–0
2	14:16	Ohio State	Sean Nuernberger 41-yard field goal	Ohio State 24–0
2	12:43	Ohio State	Michael Thomas 63-yard pass from J. T. Barrett (Sean Nuernberger kick)	Ohio State 31–0
2	4:34	Ohio State	Marcus Baugh 2-yard pass from J. T. Barrett (Sean Nuernberger kick)	Ohio State 38–0
2	1:38	Ohio State	Devin Smith 50-yard pass from J. T. Barrett (Sean Nuernberger kick)	Ohio State 45–0
3	9:20	Ohio State	Jalin Marshall 3-yard pass from J. T. Barrett (Sean Nuernberger kick)	Ohio State 52–0
3	5:08	Ohio State	Curtis Samuel 3-yard run (Sean Nuernberger kick)	Ohio State 59–0
4	12:38	Ohio State	Curtis Samuel 1-yard run (Sean Nuernberger kick)	Ohio State 66–0

In their third game of the 2014 season, Ohio State defeated the Kent State Golden Flashes of the Mid-American Conference 66–0 in Columbus. Ohio State opened the game on offense, scoring in five plays on a 14-yard touchdown pass from J. T. Barrett to Michael Thomas. A three and out by the Buckeye defense gave the ball back to the Ohio State offense, who then drove 65 yards and took a 14–0 lead on pass from Barrett to Rod Smith. After both defenses' forced interceptions on the next two possessions, the Buckeyes extended their lead late in the first quarter on a Rod Smith touchdown run. After driving deep into the Golden Flash territory, the Buckeye offense stalled and was forced to settle for a field goal early in the second quarter, giving Ohio State a 24–0 lead. The Ohio State offense scored on each of their possessions in the second quarter, which included a 63-yard touchdown pass from Barrett to Michael Thomas, as well as touchdown passes to Marcus Baugh and Devin Smith, which gave the Buckeyes a 45–0 lead at halftime.

After a Buckeye defensive stop on Kent State's first possession of the second half, Barrett and the Ohio State offense put together a 6-play, 28-yard drive that ended in a touchdown pass from Barrett to Jalin Marshall, expanding the Buckeyes lead to 52–0. On Ohio State's next offensive possession, Barrett was replaced with backup quarterback Cardale Jones, who drove Ohio State 32 yards, with Curtis Samuel scoring on a 3-yard run. A second Curtis Samuel touchdown run early in the fourth quarter was the last scoring play of the game. J. T. Barrett was recognized as the Big Ten Offensive Player of the Week, as well as the Freshman Player of the Week for his record-tying six touchdown passes. With the victory, they improved their all-time record against Kent State to 3–0.

=== Cincinnati ===
Team	1	2	3	4	Total
Cincinnati	7	14	7	0	28
• #22 Ohio State	23	7	13	7	50

- Location: Columbus, Ohio
- Game start: 6:00 p.m.
- Elapsed time: 3:26
- Game attendance: 108,362
- Game weather: 81°, mostly sunny, winds 1 mph
- Referee: Daniel Capron
- TV announcers (BTN): Thom Brennaman (play-by-play), Glen Mason (color), Lisa Byington (sideline)

Scoring summary
1	13:36	Cincinnati	Chris Moore 60-yard pass from Gunner Kiel (Andrew Gantz kick)	Cincinnati 7–0
1	11:24	Ohio State	Rod Smith 3-yard run (Sean Nuernberger kick)	7–7
1	4:32	Ohio State	Ezekiel Elliott 3-yard run (Sean Nuernberger kick)	Ohio State 14–7
1	4:24	Ohio State	Team safety	Ohio State 16–7
1	1:08	Ohio State	Devin Smith 19-yard pass from J. T. Barrett (Sean Nuernberger kick)	Ohio State 23–7
2	12:34	Ohio State	Evan Spencer 19-yard pass from J. T. Barrett (Sean Nuernberger kick)	Ohio State 30–7
2	5:23	Cincinnati	Johnny Holton 19-yard pass from Gunner Kiel (Andrew Gantz kick)	Ohio State 30–14
2	0:26	Cincinnati	Chris Moore 83-yard pass from Gunner Kiel (Andrew Gantz kick)	Ohio State 30–21
3	10:03	Ohio State	Sean Nuernberger 23-yard field goal	Ohio State 33–21
3	9:20	Cincinnati	Chris Moore 78-yard pass from Gunner Kiel (Andrew Gantz kick)	Ohio State 33–28
3	5:59	Ohio State	Sean Nuernberger 42-yard field goal	Ohio State 36–28
3	1:18	Ohio State	Dontre Wilson 24-yard pass from J. T. Barrett (Sean Nuernberger kick)	Ohio State 43–28
4	10:28	Ohio State	Devin Smith 34-yard pass from J. T. Barrett (Sean Nuernberger kick)	Ohio State 50–28

In their final non-conference game of the 2014 season, Ohio State defeated the Cincinnati Bearcats of the American Athletic Conference 50–28 in Columbus. Cincinnati jumped out to an early lead, after a 60-yard touchdown pass from Gunner Kiel to Chris Moore, on their first possession of the game. The Buckeyes responded with an 8-play drive that ended in a 3-yard touchdown run from Rod Smith. On their second offensive possession, Ohio State drove 91 yards and took their first lead of the game on a 3-yard run from Ezekiel Elliott. On the first play of Cincinnati's ensuing possession, the Buckeye defense forced a fumble in the endzone, which was recovered by the Bearcats for a safety, extending Ohio State's lead to 16–7. Ohio State continued to execute on offense after the safety, scoring their third touchdown on a 19-yard pass from J. T. Barrett to Devin Smith.

The Buckeyes extended their lead to 30–7 on their first possession the second quarter, after a touchdown pass from Barrett to Evan Spencer. An Ohio State fumble on their next possession set up the Bearcats to score their second touchdown of the game on a Kiel pass to Johnny Holton. An 83-yard touchdown pass from Kiel to Chris Moore late in the first half closed the gap, with the Buckeyes holding onto a 30–21 lead at halftime. After Ohio State settled for a field goal on their first possession of the second half, Cincinnati again closed the gap with their first possession, scoring on another long touchdown pass from Kiel to Moore, cutting Ohio State's lead to 33–28. Ohio State began to pull away late in the third quarter with another field goal and a 24-yard touchdown pass from Barrett to Dontre Wilson, expanding the Buckeyes lead to 43–28.

A 34-yard touchdown pass from Barrett to Devin Smith early in the fourth quarter gave Ohio State a 50–28 lead and would be the last scoring play of the game. Quarterback J. T. Barrett completed 26 of 36 pass attempts for 330 yards with four touchdown passes, along with 79 rushing yards and was recognized as co-Big Ten Freshmen of the Week. With the victory, Ohio State improved their overall record against Cincinnati to 7–0.

=== Maryland ===
Team	1	2	3	4	Total
• #20 Ohio State	14	17	7	14	52
Maryland	3	7	7	7	24

- Location: College Park, Maryland
- Game start: 12:00 p.m.
- Elapsed time: 3:23
- Game attendance: 51,802
- Game weather: 66°, partly sunny, winds WNW 8 mph
- Referee: Michael Cannon
- TV announcers (ABC): Sean McDonough (play-by-play), Chris Spielman (color), Todd McShay (sideline)

Scoring summary
1	11:59	Ohio State	Rod Smith 1-yard run (Sean Nuernberger kick)	Ohio State 7–0
1	6:33	Ohio State	Jalin Marshall 9-yard pass from J. T. Barrett (Sean Nuernberger kick)	Ohio State 14–0
1	5:00	Maryland	Brad Craddock 57-yard field goal	Ohio State 14–3
2	12:09	Ohio State	Michael Thomas 25-yard pass from J. T. Barrett (Sean Nuernberger kick)	Ohio State 21–3
2	8:59	Ohio State	Sean Nuernberger 28-yard field goal	Ohio State 24–3
2	2:34	Maryland	Wes Brown 2-yard run (Brad Craddock kick)	Ohio State 24–10
2	0:57	Ohio State	Nick Vannett 1-yard pass from J. T. Barrett (Sean Nuernberger kick)	Ohio State 31–10
3	6:30	Ohio State	Devin Smith 30-yard pass from J. T. Barrett (Sean Nuernberger kick)	Ohio State 38–10
3	4:06	Maryland	Brandon Ross 2-yard run (Brad Craddock kick)	Ohio State 38–17
4	14:54	Ohio State	J. T. Barrett 9-yard run (Sean Nuernberger kick)	Ohio State 45–17
4	13:32	Maryland	Stefon Diggs 4-yard pass from Caleb Rowe (Brad Craddock kick)	Ohio State 45–24
4	8:58	Ohio State	Raekwon McMillan 19-yard interception return (Sean Nuernberger kick)	Ohio State 52–24

In their very first matchup ever, Ohio State traveled to College Park to play Maryland in the first conference game of the season, in which Ohio State defeated the Terrapins 52–24. Ohio State received the opening kickoff and scored eight plays later on a Rod Smith touchdown run. Ohio State scored again on their second possession, this time on a 9-yard touchdown pass from J. T. Barrett to Jalin Marshall, giving them an early 14–0 lead. Maryland scored their first points of the game on their second possession, scoring on a 57-yard field goal from Brad Craddock.

Early in the second quarter, Ohio State again added to their lead after driving 56 yards and scoring on a 25-yard pass from Barrett to Michael Thomas. A Sean Nuernberger field goal on the Buckeyes' next possession gave Ohio State a 24–3 lead. Maryland scored their first touchdown following a 13 play, 75-yard drive that ended with a Wes Brown run. Late in the first half, the Ohio State defense forced a turnover on a pass intercepted by C.J. Brown, setting up the Buckeye offense at the Terrapin 1-yard line. Ohio State took advantage of the turnover, and scored on a pass from Barrett to Nick Vannett, giving the Buckeyes a 31–10 lead at halftime. Both teams failed to score on their first possessions of the second half. On the Buckeyes' second drive of the third quarter, Barrett completed a 30-yard touchdown pass to Devin Smith, giving Ohio State a 38–10 advantage. The Terrapins responded on their ensuing possession, driving 75 yards and scoring on a Brandon Ross touchdown run.

On the first play of the fourth quarter, Ohio State again added to their lead, scoring on a 9-yard touchdown run from Barrett, and giving them a 45–17 lead. Maryland quarterback Caleb Rowe again led the Terrapins down the field and scored on a Stefon Diggs 4-yard touchdown reception on their first possession of the fourth quarter. Rowe was intercepted on Maryland's ensuing possession by Raekwon McMillan, who returned it 19 yards for a touchdown. With the win, Ohio State extended their Big Ten regular season win streak to 17 games, dating back to the 2012 season.

=== Rutgers ===
Team	1	2	3	4	Total
Rutgers	7	0	3	7	17
• #13 Ohio State	14	21	21	0	56

- Location: Columbus, Ohio
- Game start: 3:30 p.m.
- Elapsed time: 3:20
- Game attendance: 106,795
- Game weather: 53°, cloudy with heavy rain late, winds NW 16 mph
- Referee: Daniel Capron
- TV announcers (ABC/ESPN2): Sean McDonough (play-by-play), Chris Spielman (color), Todd McShay (sideline)

Scoring summary
1	11:34	Ohio State	Nick Vannett 12-yard pass from J. T. Barrett (Sean Nuernberger kick)	Ohio State 7–0
1	5:24	Ohio State	Ezekiel Elliott 1-yard run (Sean Nuernberger kick)	Ohio State 14–0
1	0:27	Rutgers	Desmon Peoples 1-yard run (Kyle Federico kick)	Ohio State 14–7
2	13:03	Ohio State	Nick Vannett 26-yard pass from J. T. Barrett (Sean Nuernberger kick)	Ohio State 21–7
2	9:50	Ohio State	Eli Apple 4-yard fumble recovery (Sean Nuernberger kick)	Ohio State 28–7
2	4:32	Ohio State	Rod Smith 3-yard run (Sean Nuernberger kick)	Ohio State 35–7
3	13:17	Ohio State	J. T. Barrett 33-yard run (Sean Nuernberger kick)	Ohio State 42–7
3	8:24	Ohio State	J. T. Barrett 5-yard run (Sean Nuernberger kick)	Ohio State 49–7
3	6:36	Rutgers	Kyle Federico 42-yard field goal	Ohio State 49–10
3	4:14	Ohio State	Evan Spencer 11-yard pass from J. T. Barrett (Sean Nuernberger kick)	Ohio State 56–10
4	14:54	Rutgers	Desmon Peoples 12-yard run (Kyle Federico kick)	Ohio State 56–17

In their first conference home game of the 2014 season and in the first ever meeting between Ohio State and Rutgers, the Buckeyes defeated the Scarlet Knights 56–17 in Columbus. Rutgers received the opening kickoff and was forced into a three and out by the Ohio State defense. The Buckeyes drove 52 yards on their first possession of the game and scored on a touchdown pass from quarterback J. T. Barrett to Nick Vannett. Ohio State scored again on their next possession, with a touchdown run from Ezekiel Elliott, his fourth of the season. Rutgers responded on their next drive, going 66 yards in ten plays and scoring on a touchdown run from Desmon Peoples, and cutting the Buckeyes' lead to 14–7.

Ohio State expanded their lead early in the second quarter, scoring on another Barrett touchdown pass to Vannett. The Buckeye defense scored in their third consecutive game, this time on a fumble recovery by Eli Apple, which was returned four yards for a touchdown. Rod Smith scored on a three-yard touchdown run later in the second quarter, which gave Ohio State a 35–7 lead. The Buckeye defense forced another turnover after the Scarlet Knights drove 83 yards to the Buckeye six-yard line, securing Ohio State's four-possession lead going into halftime. Ohio State, who received the second half kickoff, scored on a 4-play, 79-yard drive, which ended with a 33-yard run from Barrett. Barrett again rushed for a touchdown on Ohio State's next possession, giving Ohio State a 49–7 lead. Rutgers scored for the second time on their next possession, this time on a 42-yard field goal from Kyle Federico. Ohio State continued to dominate on offense, and responded to the field goal by scoring another touchdown on an 11-yard pass from Barrett to Evan Spencer.

Rutgers put together an 8-play, 80-yard drive that ended in a 12-yard touchdown run for Desmon Peoples early in the fourth quarter. Backup quarterback Cardale Jones eventually entered the game for Barrett as the Buckeyes began to run down the clock. Neither team scored again in the fourth quarter making the final score 56–17 in favor of the Buckeyes. Following the game, Barrett was recognized as the Big Ten Offensive Player of the Week as well as the Big Ten Freshman of the Week.

=== Penn State ===
Team	1	2	3	4	OT	Total
• #13 Ohio State	7	10	0	0	14	31
Penn State	0	0	7	10	7	24

- Location: University Park, Pennsylvania
- Game start: 8:00 p.m.
- Elapsed time: 3:52
- Game attendance: 107,895
- Game weather: 54°, pleasant, breezy, winds W 12 mph
- Referee: John O'Neill
- TV announcers (ABC): Brad Nessler (play-by-play), Todd Blackledge (color), Holly Rowe (sideline)

Scoring summary
1	10:15	Ohio State	Ezekiel Elliott 10-yard run (Sean Nuernberger kick)	Ohio State 7–0
2	11:07	Ohio State	Sean Nuernberger 49-yard field goal	Ohio State 10–0
2	3:58	Ohio State	Jeff Heuerman 1-yard pass from J. T. Barrett (Sean Nuernberger kick)	Ohio State 17–0
3	13:57	Penn State	Anthony Zettel 40-yard interception return (Sam Ficken kick)	Ohio State 17–7
4	11:08	Penn State	Saeed Blacknall 24-yard pass from Christian Hackenberg (Sam Ficken kick)	Ohio State 17–14
4	0:09	Penn State	Sam Ficken 31-yard field goal	17–17
OT		Penn State	Bill Belton 1-yard run (Sam Ficken kick)	Penn State 24–17
OT		Ohio State	J. T. Barrett 5-yard run (Sean Nuernberger kick)	24–24
2OT		Ohio State	J. T. Barrett 4-yard run (Sean Nuernberger kick)	Ohio State 31–24

In their annual rivalry game, Ohio State defeated the Penn State Nittany Lions 31–24 in double overtime. The Nittany Lions received the opening kickoff and were stopped by the Buckeye defense, who forced an interception by Christian Hackenberg, which was recovered by Vonn Bell. Ohio State capitalized on the turnover, scoring in seven plays on a 10-yard touchdown run from Ezekiel Elliott. Following the touchdown, both defenses stepped up, with neither team scoring for the remainder of the first quarter. Ohio State had their second scoring drive early in the second quarter, driving 59 yards and extending their lead to 10–0 after a 49-yard field goal from Sean Nuernberger. Ohio State scored again midway through the second quarter on a touchdown pass from J. T. Barrett to Jeff Heuerman, giving the Buckeyes a 17–0 lead going into halftime.

Ohio State received the opening kickoff of the second half. The Nittany Lion defense forced a Barrett interception on the third play of the drive, with Anthony Zettel returning it 40 yards for Penn State's first scoring play of the game. Midway through the third quarter the Buckeyes drove into Penn State territory, but were unable to capitalize on the field position, with Nuernberger missing a 41-yard field goal. The Ohio State defense forced their second Hackenberg interception on the Nittany Lions' ensuing possession, but were unable to put together to take advantage, eventually punting after a three and out. Penn State chipped the Buckeyes' lead to 17–14 early in the fourth quarter on a touchdown pass from Hackenberg to Saeed Blacknall. Following defense stops by the Nittany Lions' defense, Penn State drove 77 yards in 19 plays, and setting up a 31-yard field goal for Sam Ficken, tying the game at 17–17 and sending it to overtime.

Penn State received the ball first in overtime and scored on a touchdown run from Bill Belton. The Buckeyes responded on their possession, scoring in three plays on a run from Barrett, sending the game to a second overtime. Following an unsportsmanlike conduct penalty on Penn State, Ohio State again drove the ball into the end zone on three plays, taking a 31–24 lead. Penn State was unable to score on their ensuing possession, with Hackenberg being sacked on the final play of the game by Joey Bosa, sealing the victory for the Buckeyes. Bosa was recognized for his achievements, which included six tackles and 2.5 sacks, by being named the Big Ten Defensive Player of the Week. With the win, Ohio State improved their overall record against Penn State to 17–12 .

=== Illinois ===
Illibuck

Team	1	2	3	4	Total
Illinois	0	0	7	7	14
• #16 Ohio State	17	14	17	7	55

- Location: Columbus, Ohio
- Game start: 8:00 p.m.
- Elapsed time: 3:23
- Game attendance: 106,961
- Game weather: 39°, cloudy, winds NW 14 mph
- Referee: David Witvoet
- TV announcers (ABC): Sean McDonough (play-by-play), Chris Spielman (color), Todd McShay (sideline)

Scoring summary
1	11:25	Ohio State	Curtis Samuel 23-yard run (Sean Nuernberger kick)	Ohio State 7–0
1	6:47	Ohio State	Sean Nuernberger 44-yard field goal	Ohio State 10–0
1	1:30	Ohio State	Devin Smith 32-yard pass from J. T. Barrett (Sean Nuernberger kick)	Ohio State 17–0
2	11:43	Ohio State	Curtis Samuel 1-yard run (Sean Nuernberger kick)	Ohio State 24–0
2	0:02	Ohio State	Devin Smith 8-yard pass from J. T. Barrett (Sean Nuernberger kick)	Ohio State 31–0
3	11:56	Ohio State	Dontre Wilson 27-yard pass from Cardale Jones (Sean Nuernberger kick)	Ohio State 38–0
3	9:31	Ohio State	Sean Nuernberger 26-yard field goal	Ohio State 41–0
3	7:20	Ohio State	Jalin Marshall 30-yard run (Sean Nuernberger kick)	Ohio State 48–0
3	1:48	Illinois	Donovonn Young 5-yard run (David Reisner kick)	Ohio State 48–7
4	14:21	Ohio State	Michael Thomas 19-yard pass from Cardale Jones (Sean Nuernberger kick)	Ohio State 55–7
4	5:55	Illinois	Matt LaCosse 7-yard pass from Aaron Bailey (David Reisner kick)	Ohio State 55–14

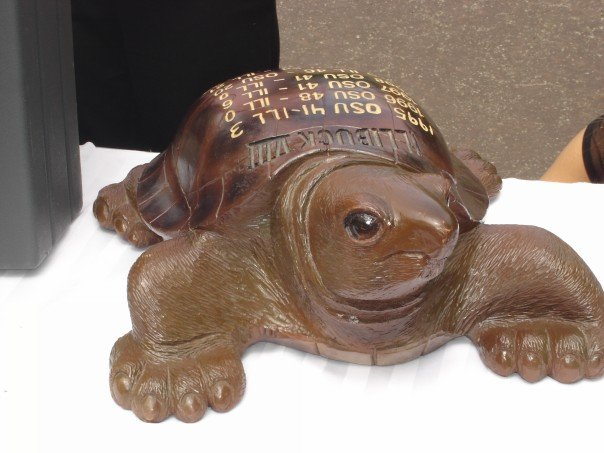
OSU won their 62nd Illibuck Trophy when they defeated Illinois on November 1.

In their traditional game for the Illibuck Trophy, Ohio State defeated the Illinois Fighting Illini 55–14 in Columbus. The Buckeyes kicked off to start the game and forced a turnover on the seventh play of the game, when Darron Lee intercepted a Reilly O'Toole pass. Ohio State took advantage of the turnover, scoring in three plays on a 23-yard Curtis Samuel touchdown run, giving the Buckeyes the early 7–0 lead. Ohio State scored on their next two drives with a field goal from Sean Nuernberger and a 32-yard touchdown pass from J. T. Barrett to Devin Smith, extending their lead to 17–0. The Buckeye continued to put pressure on the Illini, forcing a fumble by running back Josh Ferguson that was recovered by Tyvis Powell late in the first quarter, and a second interception for O'Toole recovered by Curtis Grant. Ohio State capitalized on the interception, scoring a Curtis Samuel touchdown run, his second of the game. After a 25-yard punt return late in the first half, Ohio State scored in two plays on a touchdown pass from Barrett to Devin Smith, giving the Buckeyes a 31–0 lead going into halftime.

After the first half, backup quarterback Cardale Jones replaced Barrett for the remainder of the game. Ohio State, who received the opening kickoff of the second half, scored on an 8-play, 79-yard drive that ended in a touchdown pass from Cardale Jones to Dontre Wilson. Illinois' ensuing possession ended after quarterback Aaron Bailey was sacked and fumbled the ball, with Curtis Grant recovering the fumble. Ohio State extended their lead off the turnover on a 26-yard field goal from Nuernberger, giving the Buckeyes a 41–0 lead. Ohio State again scored quickly on their next possession, with Jalin Marshall scoring on a 30-yard touchdown run. Illinois scored their first points of the game late in the third quarter on a touchdown run from Donovonn Young. Ohio State scored early in the fourth quarter on a touchdown pass from Jones to Michael Thomas. A 7-yard touchdown pass from Aaron Bailey to Matt LaCosse by the Illini to make the final score 55–14. With the win, Ohio State retained the wooden turtle trophy for which the game is famous for, and improved their all-time record against Illinois to 66–30–3 – including 62 Illibuck Trophies since it was established in 1925.

=== Michigan State ===
Team	1	2	3	4	Total
• #14 Ohio State	7	21	7	14	49
#8 Michigan State	14	7	3	13	37

- Location: East Lansing, Michigan
- Game start: 8:00 p.m.
- Elapsed time: 3:45
- Game attendance: 76,409
- Game weather: 39°, cloudy, winds NW 8 mph
- Referee: Jerry McGinn
- TV announcers (ABC): Chris Fowler (play-by-play), Kirk Herbstreit (color), Heather Cox (sideline)

Scoring summary
1	9:42	Michigan State	Keith Mumphery 15-yard pass from Connor Cook (Michael Geiger kick)	Michigan State 7–0
1	8:41	Ohio State	J. T. Barrett 5-yard run (Sean Nuernberger kick)	7–7
1	6:14	Michigan State	Jeremy Langford 33-yard run (Michael Geiger kick)	Michigan State 14–7
2	12:27	Ohio State	J. T. Barrett 1-yard run (Sean Nuernberger kick)	14–14
2	4:37	Michigan State	Jeremy Langford 1-yard pass (Michael Geiger kick)	Michigan State 21–14
2	3:19	Ohio State	Michael Thomas 79-yard pass from J. T. Barrett (Sean Nuernberger kick)	21–21
2	0:56	Ohio State	Devin Smith 44-yard pass from J. T. Barrett (Sean Nuernberger kick)	Ohio State 28–21
3	8:38	Michigan State	Michael Geiger 40-yard field goal	Ohio State 28–24
3	2:18	Ohio State	Ezekiel Elliott 1-yard run (Sean Nuernberger kick)	Ohio State 35–24
4	12:07	Ohio State	Dontre Wilson 7-yard pass from J. T. Barrett (Sean Nuernberger kick)	Ohio State 42–24
4	9:15	Michigan State	Josiah Price 16-yard pass from Connor Cook (Michael Geiger kick)	Ohio State 42–31
4	7:12	Ohio State	Ezekiel Elliott 17-yard run (Sean Nuernberger kick)	Ohio State 49–31
4	5:20	Michigan State	Jeremy Langford 1-yard run (Connor Cook pass failed)	Ohio State 49–37

In a rematch of the 2013 Big Ten Championship Game, Ohio State defeated the Michigan State Spartans 49–37 in East Lansing. Ohio State received the opening kickoff and drove 45 yards in nine plays and failed to score after a missed field goal from Sean Nuernberger. Michigan State scored the first points of the game on their first drive off a 15-yard touchdown pass from Connor Cook to Keith Mumphery. The Buckeyes responded on their ensuing possession, tying the game at 7–7 after a touchdown run from J. T. Barrett. A 33-yard run from Jeremy Langford on the Spartans' next possession, gave Michigan State a 14–7 lead.

Ohio State tied the game again early in the second quarter on a second touchdown run from Barrett. The Spartans' responded on their next drive, going 66 yards, and taking a 21–14 lead on another Langford touchdown run. On the ensuing kickoff, Dontre Wilson fumbled the ball for the Buckeyes, turning it over to the Spartans, though they were unable to score off it. Ohio State and Barrett quickly recovered on their next possession, scoring in one play on a 79-yard touchdown pass to Michael Thomas. A touchdown pass from Barrett to Devin Smith late in the first half gave Ohio State their first lead of the game at 28–21. Michigan State received the ball to start the second half and settled for a 40-yard field goal from Michael Geiger, cutting the Ohio State lead to 28–24. The Buckeyes responded on their first possession of the half, scoring on an Ezekiel Elliott touchdown run and expanding their lead to two possessions.

Ohio State began to pull away early in the fourth quarter, with a touchdown pass from Barrett to Wilson, giving the Buckeyes a 42–24 lead. A touchdown pass from Cook to Josiah Price on the Spartans' next possession cut the lead again down to eleven points, 42–31. Elliott again scored a rushing touchdown for the Buckeyes on their ensuing possession. A touchdown run from Langford on the next Spartan drive was the last scoring play of the game, giving the Buckeyes the 49–37 victory. Quarterback J. T. Barrett was recognized as the Big Ten Offensive Player and Freshman of the Week for his achievements. With the win, Ohio State continued their streak of 21 consecutive Big Ten regular season wins, and improved their all-time record against the Spartans to 29–13.

=== Minnesota ===
Team	1	2	3	4	Total
• #8 Ohio State	14	3	7	7	31
#25 Minnesota	0	14	0	10	24

- Location: Minneapolis, Minnesota
- Game start: 12:00 p.m.
- Elapsed time: 3:21
- Game attendance: 45,778
- Game weather: 15°, light snow, winds S 5 mph
- Referee: Todd Geerlings
- TV announcers (ABC): Dave Pasch (play-by-play), Brian Griese (color), Tom Luginbill (sideline)

Scoring summary
1	10:14	Ohio State	J. T. Barrett 86-yard run (Sean Nuernberger kick)	Ohio State 7–0
1	4:33	Ohio State	Jalin Marshall 57-yard pass from J. T. Barrett (Sean Nuernberger kick)	Ohio State 14–0
2	14:27	Minnesota	David Cobb 5-yard run (Ryan Santoso kick)	Ohio State 14–7
2	1:24	Minnesota	David Cobb 30-yard run (Ryan Santoso kick)	14–14
2	0:00	Ohio State	Sean Nuernberger 22-yard field goal	Ohio State 17–14
3	7:37	Ohio State	Michael Thomas 30-yard pass from J. T. Barrett (Sean Nuernberger kick)	Ohio State 24–14
4	10:08	Ohio State	Evan Spencer 22-yard pass from J. T. Barrett (Sean Nuernberger kick)	Ohio State 31–14
4	7:08	Minnesota	David Cobb 12-yard run (Ryan Santoso kick)	Ohio State 31–21
4	1:19	Minnesota	Ryan Santoso 34-yard field goal	Ohio State 31–24

In their final road conference game of the 2014 season, Ohio State defeated the Minnesota Golden Gophers 31–24 in Minneapolis. Both teams failed to convert first downs on their opening drives, with both defenses forcing three and outs. Ohio State scored their first points of the day on their second offensive drive, with an 86-yard run from quarterback J. T. Barrett, giving Ohio State a 7–0 lead. The Buckeyes scored again on their ensuing possession, with a 57-yard pass from Barrett to Jalin Marshall. Holding a 14–0 lead at the end of the first quarter, the Buckeye defense did not allow a first down conversion by the Golden Gophers during the quarter.

Minnesota opened the second quarter with a David Cobb touchdown run, off a J. T. Barrett interception, which closed the score to a one-possession game. A fumble by Jalin Marshall deep in Minnesota territory, gave the ball again to the Golden Gophers' off a turnover. Minnesota took advantage of the turnover, putting together an 11 play, 80-yard drive that ended with a 30-yard touchdown run by Cobb, tying the game a 14. On the Buckeyes' ensuing possession, they drove 57 yards and ended the first half with a 22-yard field goal by Sean Nuernberger, giving Ohio State a 17–14 lead at halftime. Minnesota opened the second half with a missed field goal on their first drive. Ohio State drove 65 yards on their first possession of the third quarter and scored on a 30-yard touchdown pass from J. T. Barrett to Michael Thomas, extending the Buckeyes' lead to 24–14. The Buckeye defense forced an interception on the ensuing Golden Gopher drive, which was returned for 28 yards by Doran Grant, though the Ohio State offense failed to take advantage and score.

Ohio State scored on a touchdown pass to Evan Spencer on their first drive of the fourth quarter. Minnesota scored their first points of the half on their next offensive drive, with David Cobb scoring his third touchdown of the game, making the score 31–21 Ohio State. A 34-yard field goal by Ryan Santoso late in the game closed the score to a one-possession game, though the Golden Gophers were unable to stop the clock, which gave the Buckeyes the 31–24 victory. Quarterback J. T. Barrett was recognized after the game as the Big Ten Freshman of the Week for his achievements. With the win, Ohio State improved their overall record against Minnesota to 44–7.

=== Indiana ===
Team	1	2	3	4	Total
Indiana	10	3	7	7	27
• #6 Ohio State	14	0	7	21	42

- Location: Columbus, Ohio
- Game start: 12:00 p.m.
- Elapsed time: 3:17
- Game attendance: 101,426
- Game weather: 35°, cloudy, winds SW 14 mph
- Referee: Ron Snodgrass
- TV announcers (BTN): Kevin Kugler (play-by-play), Glen Mason (color), Lisa Byington (sideline)

Scoring summary
1	13:49	Ohio State	Ezekiel Elliott 65-yard run (Sean Nuernberger kick)	Ohio State 7–0
1	8:28	Ohio State	Jeff Heuerman 4-yard pass from J. T. Barrett (Sean Nuernberger kick)	Ohio State 14–0
1	6:41	Indiana	Tevin Coleman 2-yard run (Griffin Oakes kick)	Ohio State 14–7
1	4:41	Indiana	Griffin Oakes 30-yard field goal	Ohio State 14–10
2	9:34	Indiana	Griffin Oakes 37-yard field goal	Ohio State 14–13
3	7:17	Indiana	Tevin Coleman 90-yard run (Griffin Oakes kick)	Indiana 20–14
3	2:20	Ohio State	Jalin Marshall 54-yard punt return (Sean Nuernberger kick)	Ohio State 21–20
4	13:03	Ohio State	Jalin Marshall 6-yard pass from J. T. Barrett (Sean Nuernberger kick)	Ohio State 28–20
4	4:21	Ohio State	Jalin Marshall 15-yard pass from J. T. Barrett (Sean Nuernberger kick)	Ohio State 35–20
4	2:49	Ohio State	Jalin Marshall 54-yard pass from J. T. Barrett (Sean Nuernberger kick)	Ohio State 42–20
4	1:13	Indiana	Tevin Coleman 52-yard run (Griffin Oakes kick)	Ohio State 42–27

In a conference divisional matchup, Ohio State defeated the Indiana Hoosiers in Columbus 42–27. Ohio State received the opening kickoff and drove 76 yards in three plays, scoring on a 65-yard touchdown run from Ezekiel Elliott. Ohio State scored again on their ensuing offensive drive, on a four-yard touchdown pass from J. T. Barrett to Jeff Heuerman, giving the Buckeyes a 14–0 lead. The Hoosiers responded on their next drive by scoring on a two-yard touchdown run by Tevin Coleman, cutting the lead to one possession. A fumble on Ohio State's next drive, allowed the Hoosiers to cut the Buckeye lead to 14–10 after a 30-yard field goal from Griffin Oakes. After forcing a second interception from J. T. Barrett, the Hoosiers took advantage, scoring on another Oakes field goal early in the second quarter, making the score 14–13 Ohio State at halftime.

After both teams failed to score on their respective opening possessions, the Hoosiers scored on their next drive on a 90-yard touchdown run from Coleman, giving Indiana their first lead at 20–14. The Buckeyes retook the lead on a 54-yard punt return by Jalin Marshall, making the score 21–20 Ohio State. The Buckeyes' first drive of the fourth quarter ended with a touchdown pass from Barrett to Marshall and gave the Buckeyes a 28–20 advantage. Following a Tyvis Powell interception, the Buckeyes took a two-possession lead late in the fourth quarter on another touchdown pass from Barrett to Marshall. Another touchdown on a connection between Barrett and Marshall sealed the game for the Buckeyes, who took a 42–20 lead. Indiana scored late on a 52-yard touchdown run by Coleman, making the final score 42–27. Following the game, Jalin Marshall was named the Big Ten Freshman of the Week with his four touchdown receptions. With the victory, Ohio State clinched their third straight division championship, securing a place in the Big Ten Championship Game and improved their overall record against Indiana to 71–9–4.

=== Michigan ===
The Game

Team	1	2	3	4	Total
Michigan	7	7	7	7	28
• #6 Ohio State	7	7	14	14	42

- Location: Columbus, Ohio
- Game start: 12:00 p.m.
- Elapsed time: 3:29
- Game attendance: 108,610
- Game weather: 41°, partly sunny, winds S 12 mph
- Referee: John O'Neill
- TV announcers (ABC): Dave Pasch (play-by-play), Brian Griese (color), Tom Luginbill (sideline)

Scoring summary
1	11:34	Ohio State	Nick Vannett 6-yard pass from J. T. Barrett (Sean Nuernberger kick)	Ohio State 7–0
1	2:42	Michigan	Jake Butt 12-yard pass from Devin Gardner (Matt Wile kick)	7–7
2	7:34	Michigan	Drake Johnson 2-yard run (Matt Wile kick)	Michigan 14–7
2	0:07	Ohio State	J. T. Barrett 25-yard run (Sean Nuernberger kick)	14–14
3	12:58	Ohio State	J. T. Barrett 2-yard run (Sean Nuernberger kick)	Ohio State 21–14
3	7:41	Michigan	Drake Johnson 4-yard run (Matt Wile kick)	21–21
3	1:08	Ohio State	Ezekiel Elliott 2-yard run (Sean Nuernberger kick)	Ohio State 28–21
4	4:58	Ohio State	Ezekiel Elliott 44-yard run (Sean Nuernberger kick)	Ohio State 35–21
4	3:58	Ohio State	Darron Lee 33-yard fumble recovery (Sean Nuernberger kick)	Ohio State 42–21
4	1:15	Michigan	Freddy Canteen 3-yard pass from Devin Gardner (Matt Wile kick)	Ohio State 42–28

In the 2014 edition of The Game, Ohio State defeated the Michigan Wolverines by a score of 42–28 in Columbus. Michigan received the opening kickoff, though the Buckeyes forced a turnover on the third play of the game, on a Devin Gardner pass intercepted by Vonn Bell. The Buckeyes took advantage of the turnover, scoring on a 6-yard touchdown pass from J. T. Barrett to Nick Vannett, to give Ohio State a 7–0 lead. Michigan tied the game up midway through the first quarter after a 7 play, 80-yard drive that ended with a touchdown pass from Gardner to Jake Butt.

The Wolverines' drove 95 yards on their first possession of the second quarter, scoring on a 2-yard touchdown run from Drake Johnson, giving Michigan their first lead at 14–7. Late in the second quarter, the Buckeyes scored their second touchdown of the game on a 25-yard run from Barrett, tying the game at 14 going into halftime. Ohio State received the opening kickoff of the second half and drove 72 yards in 5 plays, capping the drive with another touchdown run from Barrett, giving the Buckeyes a 21–14 lead. Michigan responded on their ensuing possession, scoring on a second Drake Johnson touchdown run and tying the game at 21. The Buckeyes again responded, driving 81 yards, and taking the 28–21 lead on an Ezekiel Elliott touchdown run.

The Buckeyes began to take control of the game early in the fourth quarter, on another Elliott touchdown run making the score 35–21 Ohio State. During the drive, quarterback J. T. Barrett sustained an injury to his leg and was carted off the field, not returning for the remainder of the game. On Michigan's ensuing possession, the Buckeye defense sacked Gardner, with Joey Bosa forcing a fumble, which was returned 33 yards by Darron Lee for a touchdown, which gave Ohio State a 42–21 lead. Michigan scored on their next offensive possession, on a touchdown pass from Gardner to Freddy Canteen making the score 42–28. Ohio State was able to run out the clock on their next possession, securing their third straight victory over the Wolverines' and a third consecutive undefeated Big Ten regular season. Following the game, J. T. Barrett was recognized as the Big Ten Freshman of the Week for his accomplishments. With the victory, Ohio State improved their record over Michigan since 2001 to 12–2.

=== Big Ten Championship vs. Wisconsin ===
Big Ten Championship Game: #13 Wisconsin Badgers (10–2) vs. #5 Ohio State Buckeyes (11–1)

Quarter	1	2	3	4	Total
#13 Wisconsin	0	0	0	0	0
#5 Ohio State	14	24	7	14	59

at Lucas Oil Stadium • Indianapolis, Indiana

- Date: December 6
- Game time: 8:15 p.m. EDT
- Game weather: Indoors (roof closed)
- Game attendance: 60,229
- Referee: Mike Gannon
- TV announcers (Fox): Gus Johnson, Charles Davis and Molly McGrath
- Box Score

Game information

Wisconsin

- Joel Stave
  17/43, 187 Yds, 3 INT
- Melvin Gordon
  26 Rush, 76 Yds
- Alex Erickson
  7 Rec, 83 Yds

Ohio St

- Cardale Jones
  12/17, 257 Yds, 3 TD
- Ezekiel Elliott
  20 Rush, 220 Yds, 2 TD
- Devin Smith
  4 Rec, 137 Yds, 3 TD

In the program's second consecutive appearance in the Big Ten Championship Game, Ohio State defeated the Wisconsin Badgers 59–0. Ohio State received the opening kickoff and scored on their opening drive on a 39-yard touchdown pass to Devin Smith from quarterback Cardale Jones, who was making his first career start at Ohio State. Midway through the first quarter, the Buckeyes scored on a 2-play drive, which ended in an 81-yard touchdown run by Ezekiel Elliott, giving Ohio State the 14–0 advantage. The Buckeye defense forced their first turnover of the game on the Badgers' ensuing possession, with Joel Stave having a pass intercepted by Vonn Bell.

The Buckeyes took advantage of the turnover, scoring on a 7-play, 53-yard drive that ended with a 23-yard field goal from Sean Nuernberger. The next Buckeye possession also resulted in scores, with a 44-yard touchdown reception by Devin Smith from Cardale Jones and a 14-yard run from Elliott, extending the Ohio State lead to 31–0. The Buckeye defense forced the Wisconsin offense in the three and outs three times during the second quarter, and got a score on a fumble recovery, returned by Joey Bosa, which gave Ohio State a 38–0 lead going into halftime.

The Buckeye defense again stopped the Badgers' on their first possession of the second half. Ohio State drove 77 yards in 5 plays on their first possession of the half, scoring on another touchdown pass from Jones to Smith, making the score 45–0 Ohio State. The Buckeye defense forced another Badger turnover late in the third quarter, on a Stave pass that was intercepted by Doran Grant, though they were unable to score off it, with the Badgers blocking a field goal attempt. A 12-yard run by Curtis Samuel midway through the fourth quarter gave Ohio State a 52–0 lead. Ohio State's ensuing possession also ended with points on a Samuel touchdown run. The Buckeye defense continued to stop the Badgers and finished the game with their second shutout of the season, with the Buckeyes winning 59–0.

The victory gave Ohio State their first outright conference championship since the 2009 season. Quarterback Cardale Jones was named the MVP of the game after completing 12 of 17 pass attempts for 257 yards, and throwing three touchdown passes. With the victory, Ohio State improved their all-time record against Wisconsin to 57–18–5.

Scoring summary

Quarter	Time	Drive			Team	Scoring information	Score	
Quarter	Time	Plays	Yards	TOP	Team	Scoring information	WIS	OSU
1	13:01	6	77	1:59	Ohio St	Devin Smith 39-yard touchdown reception from Cardale Jones, Sean Nuernberger kick good	0	7
1	4:06	2	93	0:42	Ohio St	Ezekiel Elliott 81-yard touchdown run, Sean Nuernberger kick good	0	14
2	14:14	7	53	2:41	Ohio St	23-yard field goal by Sean Nuernberger	0	17
2	11:09	3	63	1:17	Ohio St	Devin Smith 44-yard touchdown reception from Cardale Jones, Sean Nuernberger kick good	0	24
2	6:36	6	69	2:52	Ohio St	Ezekiel Elliott 14-yard touchdown run, Sean Nuernberger kick good	0	31
2	0:36				Ohio St	Fumble recovery returned 4 yards for touchdown by Joey Bosa, Sean Nuernberger kick good	0	38
3	9:24	5	77	2:47	Ohio St	Devin Smith 42-yard touchdown reception from Cardale Jones, Sean Nuernberger kick good	0	45
4	11:39	2	72	0:34	Ohio St	Curtis Samuel 12-yard touchdown run, Sean Nuernberger kick good	0	52
4	2:25	7	61	4:02	Ohio St	Curtis Samuel 1-yard touchdown run, Sean Nuernberger kick good	0	59
"TOP" = time of possession. For other American football terms, see Glossary of American football.							0	{{{Home}}}

=== CFP Semifinal at Sugar Bowl vs. Alabama ===
2015 College Football Playoff Semifinal at the Sugar Bowl

Team	1	2	3	4	Total
• #4 Ohio State	6	14	14	8	42
#1 Alabama	14	7	7	7	35

- Location: New Orleans, Louisiana
- Game start: 9:00 p.m.
- Elapsed time: 3:41
- Game attendance: 74,682
- Game weather: Indoors (dome stadium)
- Referee: Land Clark
- TV announcers (ESPN): Brad Nessler (play-by-play), Todd Blackledge (color), Holly Rowe (sideline)

Scoring summary
1	11:32	Ohio State	Sean Nuernberger 22-yard field goal	Ohio State 3–0
1	9:25	Alabama	Derrick Henry 25-yard run (Adam Griffith kick)	Alabama 7–3
1	5:17	Ohio State	Sean Nuernberger 21-yard field goal	Alabama 7–6
1	2:06	Alabama	Amari Cooper 15-yard pass from Blake Sims (Adam Griffith kick)	Alabama 14–6
2	8:07	Alabama	T. J. Yeldon 2-yard run (Adam Griffith kick)	Alabama 21–6
2	2:55	Ohio State	Ezekiel Elliott 3-yard run (Sean Nuernberger kick)	Alabama 21–13
2	0:12	Ohio State	Michael Thomas 13-yard pass from Evan Spencer (Sean Nuernberger kick)	Alabama 21–20
3	12:44	Ohio State	Devin Smith 47-yard pass from Cardale Jones (Sean Nuernberger kick)	Ohio State 27–21
3	3:21	Ohio State	Steve Miller 41-yard interception return (Sean Nuernberger kick)	Ohio State 34–21
3	1:01	Alabama	Blake Sims 5-yard run (Adam Griffith kick)	Ohio State 34–28
4	3:24	Ohio State	Ezekiel Elliott 85-yard run (Michael Thomas pass from Cardale Jones)	Ohio State 42–28
4	1:59	Alabama	Amari Cooper 6-yard pass from Blake Sims (Adam Griffith kick)	Ohio State 42–35

On December 7, 2014, the final College Football Playoff standings were released with Ohio State ranked No. 4, selected to face the No. 1 Alabama Crimson Tide in the College Football Playoff Semifinal at the Sugar Bowl. In the game, the Buckeyes defeated the Crimson Tide 42–35 to advance to the College Football Playoff National Championship. Alabama started the game on offense, with the Buckeye defense forcing a three and out. The Buckeyes' first drive of the game went 80 yards and ended with a 22-yard field goal from Sean Nuernberger, giving Ohio State a 3–0 lead. Ohio State's next possession ended with a fumble by Ezekiel Elliott, recovered by the Crimson Tide in Ohio State territory. Alabama took advantage of the turnover, scoring on a Derrick Henry 25-yard touchdown run, giving them a 7–3 lead. The Buckeyes settled for another field goal on their next possession, cutting the score to a one-point game. A 15-yard touchdown pass from Blake Sims to Amari Cooper gave the Crimson Tide a 14–6 lead at the end of the first quarter.

Quarterback Cardale Jones, starting his second career game, threw an interception to Cyrus Jones early in the second quarter, setting up an Alabama drive that ended with a 2-yard touchdown run from T. J. Yeldon, extending the Crimson Tide lead to 21–6. Ohio State responded on their next possession, going 71 yards in 12 plays, and scoring on an Elliott touchdown run, cutting the score to 21–13 Alabama. The Buckeyes closed out the first half by scoring on a trick play, a 13-yard pass from Evan Spencer to Michael Thomas, cutting the Crimson Tide lead to 21–20 going into halftime.

Ohio State received the opening kickoff of the second half, drove 75 yards, and scored on a 47-yard pass from Cardale Jones to Devin Smith, giving them the lead with a score of 27–21. Midway through the third quarter, Blake Sims threw an interception to Steve Miller that was returned 41 yards, and increased the Buckeye lead to two possessions at 34–21. Alabama responded on their ensuing possession, scoring on a 5-yard touchdown run from Sims, making the score 34–28 Ohio State at the end of the third quarter.

Blake Sims threw his second interception of the game early in the fourth quarter, though the Buckeyes were unable to capitalize on the turnover. An 85-yard touchdown run from Ezekiel Elliott with less than four minutes in the game gave the Buckeyes a 42–28 lead, after the successful two-point conversion. Alabama went 65 yards in a minute and a half on their next possession, scoring on a 6-yard touchdown pass from Sims to Amari Cooper, to cut the game again to one possession. The game ended on a Hail Mary pass from Sims that was intercepted by Tyvis Powell, giving Ohio State the 42–35 victory. For their achievements, running back Ezekiel Elliott was named the offensive MVP of the game, and Darron Lee was named the defensive MVP. The loss was the Southeastern Conference's second straight major bowl loss to Ohio State.

=== CFP Championship vs. Oregon ===
2015 College Football Playoff National Championship

Team	1	2	3	4	Total
#2 Oregon	7	3	10	0	20
• #4 Ohio State	14	7	7	14	42

- Location: Arlington, Texas
- Game start: 8:30 p.m.
- Elapsed time: 3:37
- Game attendance: 85,689
- Game weather: Indoors (retractable roof closed)
- Referee: Greg Burks
- TV announcers (ESPN): Chris Fowler (play-by-play), Kirk Herbstreit (color), Heather Cox (sideline), Tom Rinaldi (sideline)

Scoring summary
1	12:21	Oregon	Keanon Lowe 7-yard pass from Marcus Mariota (Adrian Schneider kick)	Oregon 7–0
1	4:36	Ohio State	Ezekiel Elliott 33-yard run (Sean Nuernberger kick)	7–7
1	1:08	Ohio State	Nick Vannett 1-yard pass from Cardale Jones (Sean Nuernberger kick)	Ohio State 14–7
2	4:49	Ohio State	Cardale Jones 1-yard run (Sean Nuernberger kick)	Ohio State 21–7
2	0:48	Oregon	Adrian Schneider 26-yard field goal	Ohio State 21–10
3	11:23	Oregon	Byron Marshall 70-yard pass from Marcus Mariota (Adrian Schneider kick)	Ohio State 21–17
3	6:39	Oregon	Adrian Schneider 23-yard field goal	Ohio State 21–20
3	0:00	Ohio State	Ezekiel Elliott 9-yard run (Sean Nuernberger kick)	Ohio State 28–20
4	9:44	Ohio State	Ezekiel Elliott 2-yard run (Sean Nuernberger kick)	Ohio State 35–20
4	0:28	Ohio State	Ezekiel Elliott 1-yard run (Sean Nuernberger kick)	Ohio State 42–20

Following victories in their respective bowl games on January 1, the No. 4 Buckeyes and the No. 2 Oregon Ducks advanced to face each other in the inaugural College Football Playoff National Championship at AT&T Stadium. Coming into the game, Ohio State had never lost to Oregon, holding an 8–0 all-time record against the Ducks.

Oregon won the coin toss and elected to receive the ball the start the game. The Ducks' first drive featured running back Thomas Tyner and quarterback Marcus Mariota driving Oregon 75 yards and scoring on a 7-yard touchdown pass from Mariota to Keanon Lowe to give Oregon an early 7–0 lead. The Buckeye offense struggled on their first drive, going only 17 yards, and was forced to punt. The Buckeye defense stopped Oregon at midfield on their next possession and forced them to punt, setting up Ohio State inside their own 3-yard line. During the drive, Ohio State went 97-yard and scored their first points of the game on a 33-yard touchdown run from Ezekiel Elliott, tying the game at 7–7. The Buckeye defense forced the Ducks to punt on their next two possessions. The Ohio State offense took advantage by scoring on a touchdown pass from Cardale Jones to Nick Vannett, making the score 14–7 Ohio State at the end of the first quarter.

On the fourth play of the second quarter, Ohio State turned the ball over on a fumble by Cardale Jones, giving the Ducks' possession of the ball at own 41-yard line. The Ducks' drove down to the Ohio State 3-yard line, but were unable to take advantage of the turnover after failing to convert on fourth down. The Buckeye offense took over at their own 1-yard line and quickly drove to midfield. The drive ended, however, on another Ohio State turnover, this time on a pass from Jones to Corey Smith that was fumbled by Smith, which allowed Oregon to take over at their own 9-yard line. Oregon, again, was unable to capitalize on the turnover, with the Buckeye defense forcing a three and out. The ensuing Ohio State possession took only 6 plays and ended with a touchdown run from Jones, giving Ohio State a 21–7 lead. The next Ducks' possession went 66 yards in 12 plays and ended with a 26-yard field goal from Aidan Schneider. After the Oregon defense forced a three and out on the Buckeyes' next possession, Oregon went into halftime, trailing Ohio State 21–10.

Ohio State received the opening kickoff of the second half. Ohio State turned the ball over on their first possession of the half on a Cardale Jones pass intercepted by Danny Mattingly returned to the Oregon 30-yard line. The Ducks took advantage of the turnover in one play on a 70-yard touchdown pass from Marcus Mariota to Byron Marshall, making the score 21–17 Ohio State. The Buckeyes turned the ball over for a fourth time on their next possession, with Jones fumbling the ball inside Ohio State territory. Aidan Schneider made a 23-yard field goal off the turnover, with the score 21–20 Ohio State. The Buckeyes' ensuing possession went 75 yards in 12 plays, ending on a 9-yard touchdown run from Ezekiel Elliott to make the score 28–20 Ohio State at the end of the third quarter.

After a Buckeye defensive stop, the Ohio State offense and Ezekiel Elliott again scored a touchdown, making the score 35–20 Ohio State early in the fourth quarter. Both teams exchanged punts on their drives. With less than three minutes remaining in the game, the Oregon offense attempt to convert a fourth down, though the pass from Marcus Mariota was incomplete. Ohio State regained possession and scored on a fourth touchdown from Elliott. The last play of the game was a Mariota pass that was intercepted by Eli Apple and made the final score 42–20.

For their performances, Ezekiel Elliott was named the game's offensive MVP, and Tyvis Powell was named the game's defensive MVP. Ohio State improved their all-time record against Oregon to 9–0, won the first ever College Football Playoff national championship, and the program's first national championship since 2002. It was Ohio State's eighth claimed national championship, and sixth national championship by vote of the AP and Coaches' polls. The fourteen season victories tied the 2002 season for the most in program history.

== Rankings ==
Entering the 2014 season, the Buckeyes were ranked No. 5 in the AP and No. 6 in the Coaches' Preseason Polls. After a 35–21 loss to Virginia Tech on September 6, Ohio State dropped to No. 22 in the AP and No. 18 in the Coaches' Polls. When the first College Football Playoff rankings came out on October 28, the Buckeyes were No. 16. After Ohio State defeated No. 7 Michigan State 49–37 on November 8, they moved up to No. 8 in the AP and No. 7 in the Coaches' Poll, as well as moving up to No. 8 in the CFP rankings. Entering the Big Ten Championship Game, the Buckeyes were ranked No. 6 in both the AP and Coaches' Polls, and No. 5 in the CFP rankings. Following the 59–0 win over Wisconsin in the Big Ten Championship Game, Ohio State moved up to No. 5 in the AP Poll and No. 4 in the Coaches' Poll. On December 7, it was announced that Ohio State had passed TCU in the CFP rankings into the No. 4 ranking, which qualified them to participate in the inaugural College Football Playoff. After the victory over Oregon in the College Football Playoff National Championship, Ohio State finished in the No. 1 position unanimously in both the AP and Coaches' polls as consensus national champions.

Ranking movements Legend: ██ Increase in ranking ██ Decrease in ranking ( ) = First-place votes
	Week																
Poll	Pre	1	2	3	4	5	6	7	8	9	10	11	12	13	14	15	Final
AP	5	8	22	23	22	20	15	13	13	13	13	8	7	7	6	5	1 (59)
Coaches	6 (1)	7	18	18	20	18	15	13	12	13	13	7	7	7	6	4	1 (64)
CFP	Not released									16	14	8	6	6	5	4	Not released

== After the season ==
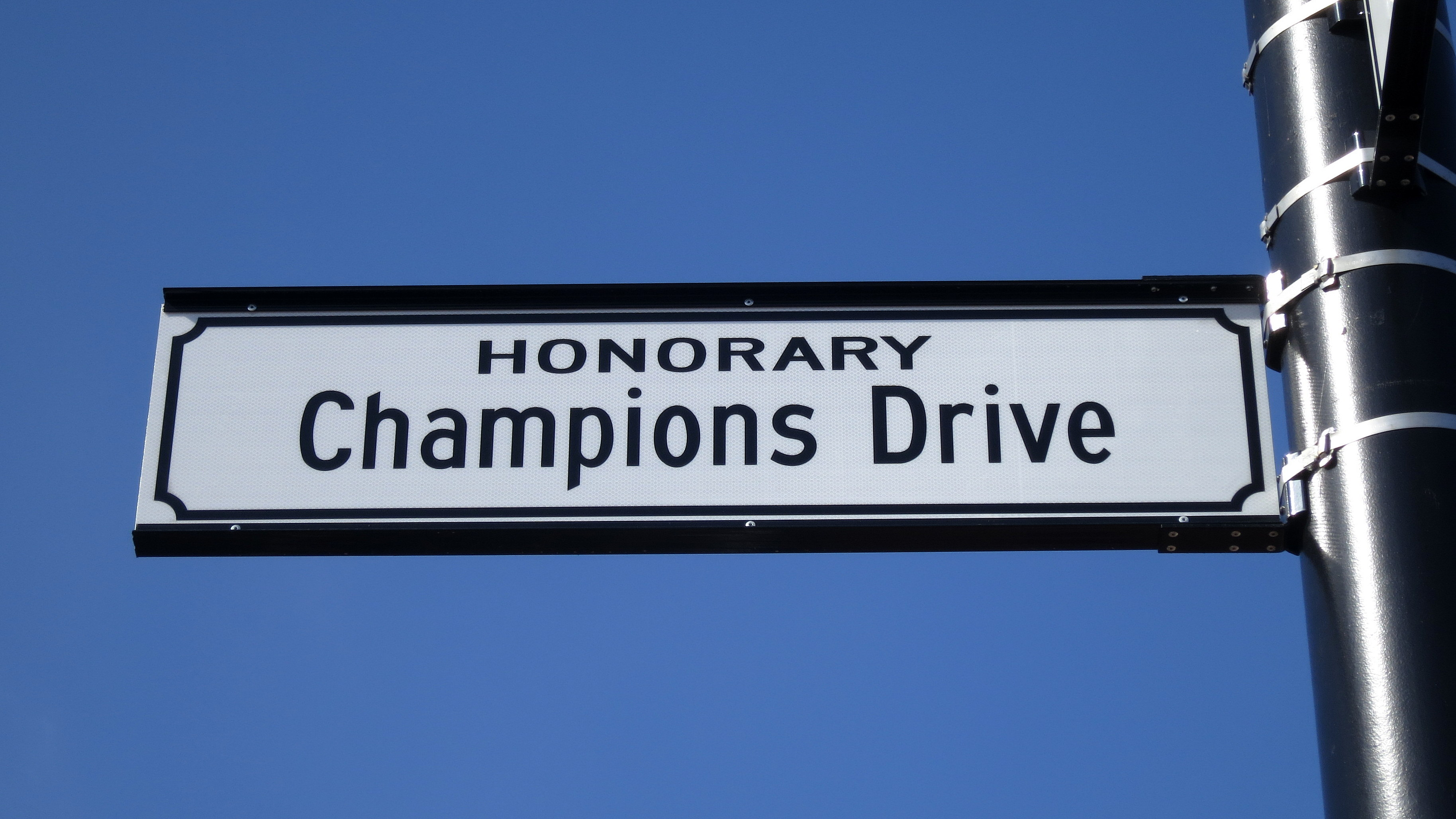
Dublin, Ohio renamed its North High Street in honor of the team's accomplishments during the 2014 season.

Following their victory over Oregon for the national championship, the team returned to Columbus on January 13, where they were greeted by fans upon their arrival at Port Columbus International Airport, as well as when they returned to the campus. On January 18, the official championship celebration was held at Ohio Stadium, which was attended by an estimated 45,000 fans. The event included a performance by the Ohio State University Marching Band, as well as speeches from athletic director Gene Smith, head coach Urban Meyer, Braxton Miller, and Ezekiel Elliott.

=== Final statistics ===
Following their win over Oregon in the College Football Playoff National Championship, Ohio State's final team statistics were released. On the offensive side of the ball, Ohio State ranked ninth in total offense (511.6 yards per game), eighth in rushing offense (264.5 yards per game), 51st in passing offense (247.1 yards per game), and fifth in scoring offense (44.8 points per game). In conference, Ohio State ranked first in total offense, second in rushing offense, and third in passing offense. On the defensive side of the ball, Ohio State ranked 19th in total defense (342.4 yards per game), 34th in rushing defense (141.3 yards per game), 28th in passing defense (201.1 yards per game), and 26th in scoring defense (22.0 points per game). In conference, Ohio State ranked fifth in total defense, fifth in rushing defense, and sixth in passing defense.

Individually, Ezekiel Elliott led the team in rushing with 1,878 total yards (125.2 yards per game), scoring 18 touchdowns, and ranking 12th nationally in rushing yards per game. J. T. Barrett finished the season completing 203 of 314 pass attempts, with 2,834 passing yards, 34 touchdown passes, and 10 interceptions. Cardale Jones finished the season completing 56 of 92 pass attempts, with 860 passing yards, 7 touchdown passes, and 2 interceptions. Joshua Perry led the team 124 total tackles and 73 solo tackles. Vonn Bell led the team with 6 interceptions, and Joey Bosa led the team with 13.5 sacks.

== Awards and honors ==
=== Individual ===
- QB J. T. Barrett
  - Thompson-Randle El Freshman of the Year
  - Griese-Brees Quarterback of the Year
  - All Big Ten First Team (Media and Coaches)
  - AP All-American Third Team.
- DE Joey Bosa
  - Nagurski-Woodson Defensive Player of the Year
  - Smith-Brown Defensive Lineman of the Year
  - All Big Ten First Team (Media and Coaches)
  - unanimous All-Big Ten First Team,
  - unanimous All-American.
- OL Pat Elfein, and LB Doran Grant – All-Big Ten First Team (Coaches).
- OL Taylor Decker, TE Jeff Heuerman – All-Big Ten Second Team (Coaches)
- Elflein, Decker, Heuerman, Grant, and LB Joshua Perry – All-Big Ten Second Team (Media).
- DL Michael Bennett
  - All Big Ten Second Team (Coaches)
  - AP All-American Third Team
  - CBS All-American Team,
  - CFPA National Freshman Performer of the Year
  - Freshman All-American,
- LB Darron Lee, LB Raekwon McMillan, and CB Eli Apple – Freshman All American.
- Offensive coordinator and quarterbacks coach Tom Herman – Broyles Award (best assistant coach of the year).
- Head coach Urban Meyer – West Bridge Street in Dublin, Ohio renamed Urban Meyer Way

=== Team ===
- Intersection of Lane Avenue and High Street in Columbus renamed Undisputed Way
- North High Street in Dublin, Ohio renamed Champions Drive
- Inaugural Cincinnati Reds Reds Country Athletic Achievement Award

=== NFL Draft selections ===
Thirty-one former players have been selected in the NFL draft so far:

Player	Position	Round	Pick	Year	NFL team
Joey Bosa	Defensive end	1	3	2016	San Diego Chargers
Ezekiel Elliott	Running back	1	4	2016	Dallas Cowboys
Eli Apple	Cornerback	1	10	2016	New York Giants
Marshon Lattimore	Cornerback	1	11	2017	New Orleans Saints
Malik Hooker	Safety	1	15	2017	Indianapolis Colts
Taylor Decker	Offensive tackle	1	16	2016	Detroit Lions
Darron Lee	Linebacker	1	20	2016	New York Jets
Billy Price	Center	1	21	2018	Cincinnati Bengals
Gareon Conley	Cornerback	1	24	2017	Oakland Raiders
Devin Smith	Wide receiver	2	37	2015	New York Jets
Curtis Samuel	Wide receiver	2	40	2017	Carolina Panthers
Michael Thomas	Wide receiver	2	47	2016	New Orleans Saints
Raekwon McMillan	Linebacker	2	54	2017	Miami Dolphins
Parris Campbell	Wide receiver	2	59	2019	Indianapolis Colts
Vonn Bell	Safety	2	61	2016	New Orleans Saints
Tyquan Lewis	Defensive end	2	64	2018	Indianapolis Colts
Pat Elflein	Center	3	70	2017	Minnesota Vikings
Terry McLaurin	Wide receiver	3	76	2019	Washington Redskins
Sam Hubbard	Defensive end	3	77	2018	Cincinnati Bengals
Adolphus Washington	Defensive tackle	3	80	2016	Buffalo Bills
Braxton Miller	Wide receiver	3	85	2016	Houston Texans
Jeff Heuerman	Tight end	3	92	2015	Denver Broncos
Nick Vannett	Tight end	3	94	2016	Seattle Seahawks
Joshua Perry	Linebacker	4	102	2016	San Diego Chargers
Jalyn Holmes	Defensive end	4	102	2018	Minnesota Vikings
Doran Grant	Cornerback	4	121	2015	Pittsburgh Steelers
Cardale Jones	Quarterback	4	139	2016	Buffalo Bills
Jamarco Jones	Offensive tackle	5	168	2018	Seattle Seahawks
Michael Bennett	Defensive tackle	6	180	2015	Jacksonville Jaguars
Evan Spencer	Wide receiver	6	187	2015	Washington Redskins
Noah Brown	Wide receiver	7	239	2017	Dallas Cowboys
