= Death of Kosta Karageorge =

American athlete and suicide victim

Personal information
- Full name: Kostadinos Alexander Karageorge
- Nickname: Kosta
- Born: July 6, 1992 Columbus, Ohio, U.S.
- Died: November 30, 2014 (aged 22) Columbus, Ohio, U.S.
- Education: Thomas Worthington High School
- Years active: 2011–2013
- Height: 6 ft 3 in (191 cm)
- Weight: 273 lb (124 kg)

Sport
- Sport: Freestyle wrestling
- College team: Oklahoma
Kosta Karageorge
No. 53
- Position: Nose tackle
Personal information
- Listed height: 6 ft 3 in (1.91 m)
- Listed weight: 273 lb (124 kg)
Career information
- High school: Thomas Worthington High School
- College: Ohio State (2014)
- Stats at ESPN

Kostadinos Alexander "Kosta" Karageorge (July 10, 1992 – November 30, 2014) was an American football player and collegiate wrestler at Ohio State University. Karageorge's death from a self-inflicted gunshot wound led to a controversy over undiagnosed concussions and chronic traumatic encephalopathy in athletes. Karageorge's initial autopsy showed no signs of CTE, but a later autopsy produced conflicting results.

== Early life ==
Karageorge was born on July 10, 1992, in Columbus, Ohio, to Greek-American parents. He grew up in the Greek Orthodox tradition. Karageorge became an All-American at Junior Nationals for Team Ohio and placed 6th in the state tournament his senior year of high school.

== Collegiate career ==
Karageorge initially attended the University of Oklahoma, where he was a wrestler. After transferring to Ohio State, he continued wrestling and was a walk-on to the football team for the 2014 season. Karageorge mostly played nose tackle in practice, and played in one game, against Penn State, recording one assisted tackle.

== Death and CTE controversy ==
In November 2014, he was reported missing by his mother after she and other family and friends had received distressing text messages and social media posts by Karageorge concerning his headaches around his recent concussion. He proceeded to miss upcoming football practices and finally the Ohio State game against rival University of Michigan, raising concerns about his welfare. Following a dispute with his girlfriend on November 30, 2014, Karageorge climbed in a dumpster near his apartment and shot himself.

After Karageorge's death, his initial autopsy done in consultation with an Ohio State pathologist reported that there were no initial signs of CTE. His family then sent his brain to a facility in Massachusetts that handles brains of veterans and sports athletes, checking for chronic traumatic encephalopathy. As an athlete, he experienced 15 reported concussions; however, he is suspected of having experienced many more than 15, especially considering his history of concussions before college. An examination by Dr. Ann McKee, a Boston University neuropathologist at the BU Brain Bank, conflicted with the original autopsy findings, diagnosing Karageorge with stage one CTE, though she qualified her diagnosis by stating that it was "impossible to definitively link his suicide to any brain trauma he had sustained in sports."

Karageorge was remembered by the student body in a candlelight vigil, which took place on Ohio State University's Oval, next to a statue of university president William Oxley Thompson, where remembrance ceremonies are traditionally held by the student body. Students gathered there in the evening of November 30, 2014, after he was found. Ohio State University football team members served as Karageorge's pallbearers and included his jersey number (#53) as a helmet sticker in the game against Wisconsin.

== See also ==
- List of gridiron football players who died during their careers
