= Adolphus Washington =

American former football player (born 1992)

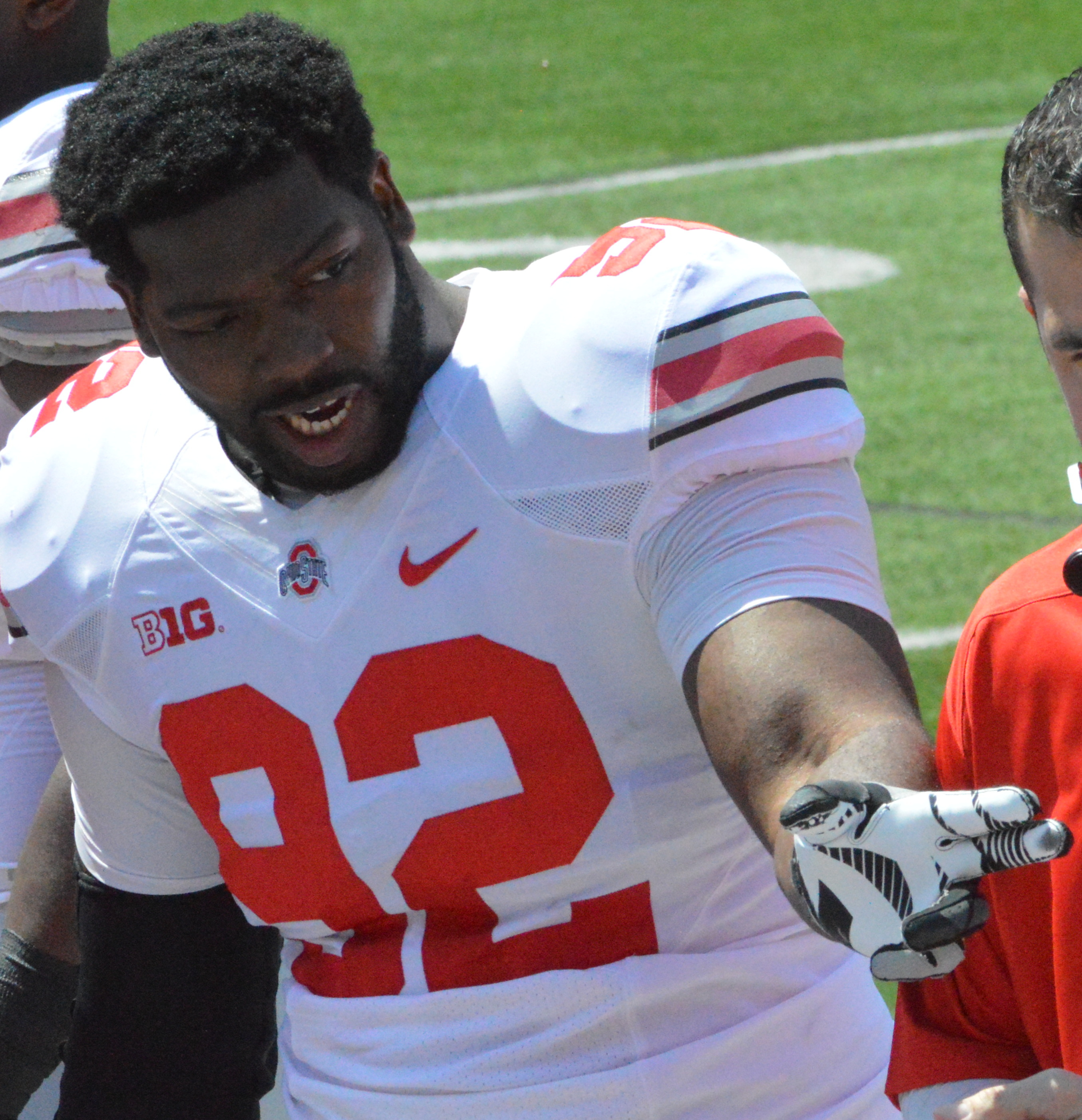
- Washington with the Ohio State Buckeyes in 2014

No. 92
- Position: Defensive tackle

Personal information
- Born: November 24, 1994 (age 31); Cincinnati, Ohio, U.S.
- Listed height: 6 ft 4 in (1.93 m)
- Listed weight: 295 lb (134 kg)

Career information
- High school: Taft (Cincinnati)
- College: Ohio State (2012–2015)
- NFL draft: 2016: 3rd round, 80th overall pick

Career history
- Buffalo Bills (2016–2018); Dallas Cowboys (2018)*; Cincinnati Bengals (2018); Miami Dolphins (2019)*
- * Offseason or practice squad member only

Awards and highlights
- CFP national champion (2014); First-team All-American (2015); Second-team All-Big Ten (2015)

Career NFL statistics
- Total tackles: 62
- Sacks: 4.5
- Stats at Pro Football Reference

Adolphus Fitzgerald Washington Jr. (born November 24, 1994) is an American former professional football player who was a defensive tackle in the National Football League (NFL). He played college football for the Ohio State Buckeyes and was selected by the Buffalo Bills in the third round of the 2016 NFL draft.

== Early life ==
Washington attended Roger Bacon High School in St. Bernard, Ohio, as a freshman, before transferring to Robert A. Taft Information Technology High School in Cincinnati, Ohio, for his final three years. He had 90 tackles and 23.5 sacks as a senior and 107 tackles and 19 sacks as a junior. Washington was a five-star recruit. He committed to Ohio State University to play college football. Washington also played basketball in high school. As a senior, he averaged 23.1 points and 14.3 rebounds per game and was named the Gatorade Basketball Player of the Year for Ohio. Washington was named a Parade Magazine All-American in both football and basketball.

== College career ==
As a freshman in 2012, Washington played in 10 games. He recorded nine tackles and three sacks. As a sophomore in 2013, he played in 12 games with five starts and recorded 36 tackles and two sacks. As a junior in 2014, he started all 14 games, recording 48 tackles and 4.5 sacks. During the 2015 College Football Playoff National Championship against Oregon, he had three tackles and a sack. On December 9, 2015, Washington was cited for solicitation. As a result, he was suspended for the Fiesta Bowl.

=== College statistics ===
			Defense				
Year	Team	GP	Tackles	For Loss	Sacks	Int	PD
2012	OSU	11	9	3.5	3.0	0	0
2013	OSU	11	36	4.0	2.0	0	0
2014	OSU	14	48	10.5	4.5	0	3
2015	OSU	11	49	7.0	4.0	1	1
Total		47	142	25.0	13.5	1	4

== Professional career ==
Pre-draft measurables
Height	Weight	Arm length	Hand span	40-yard dash	20-yard shuttle	Three-cone drill	Vertical jump	Broad jump	Bench press
6 ft 3 3/8 in (1.91 m)	301 lb (137 kg)	34 1/2 in (0.88 m)	9 7/8 in (0.25 m)	5.17 s	4.79 s	8.06 s	27 in (0.69 m)	8 ft 3 in (2.51 m)	21 reps
All values from NFL Combine

=== Buffalo Bills ===
Washington was selected by the Buffalo Bills in the third round, 80th overall, in the 2016 NFL draft. He played in 15 games with 11 starts his rookie season, recording 21 tackles and 2.5 sacks. The following year in 2017, he started 10 games out of 15 played, recording 33 tackles and one sack.

After just one game in 2018, the Bills released him on September 10, 2018. Washington finished his time on the Bills with 3.5 sacks and 56 tackles.

=== Dallas Cowboys ===
On September 18, 2018, Washington was signed to the practice squad of the Dallas Cowboys.

=== Cincinnati Bengals ===
On September 26, 2018, Washington was signed by the Cincinnati Bengals off the Cowboys' practice squad. He was placed on injured reserve on November 23, 2018, after suffering a knee injury in Week 9. On April 23, 2019, the Bengals waived Washington.

=== Miami Dolphins ===
On May 23, 2019, Washington was signed by the Miami Dolphins. He was waived on September 1, 2019.

== Personal life ==
On July 9, 2017, Washington was arrested for a misdemeanor weapons charge in Sharonville, Ohio. On August 28, 2017, he was acquitted of weapons charges.
