= Evan Spencer =

American football player (born 1993)

No. 85
- Position: Wide receiver

Personal information
- Born: May 26, 1993 (age 33); Vernon Hills, Illinois, U.S.
- Listed height: 6 ft 2 in (1.88 m)
- Listed weight: 208 lb (94 kg)

Career information
- High school: Vernon Hills
- College: Ohio State (2011-2014)
- NFL draft: 2015: 6th round, 187th overall pick

Career history
- Washington Redskins (2015)*; Tampa Bay Buccaneers (2015)
- * Offseason or practice squad member only

Awards and highlights
- CFP national champion (2015)
- Stats at Pro Football Reference

Evan Spencer (born May 26, 1993) is an American former professional football player who was a wide receiver in the National Football League (NFL). He played college football for the Ohio State Buckeyes. He was selected by the Washington Redskins in the sixth round of the 2015 NFL draft.

== College career ==
Spencer is well known for the touchdown pass he threw to Michael Thomas on a trick play going into half time in the 2015 Sugar Bowl vs. Alabama. This touchdown helped give the underdog Buckeyes the momentum and eventually beat Alabama 42–35. Later in the game he threw a key block on the game clinching 85-yard touchdown, the longest run given up by Alabama that year. The Buckeyes advanced to the national championship game where they defeated Oregon to win the first College Football Playoff National championship 42–20.

== Professional career ==
=== Washington Redskins ===
Spencer was selected by the Washington Redskins with the 187th overall pick in the 2015 NFL draft. He signed a four-year contract on May 11, 2015. On September 5, he was waived/injured during final roster cuts before the start of the regular season. He was placed on the team's injured reserve after going unclaimed on waivers. On September 9, the Redskins released Spencer with an injury settlement.

=== Tampa Bay Buccaneers ===
The Tampa Bay Buccaneers signed Spencer to their practice squad on September 22, 2015. This united him with his father, Tim, who at the time was the Buccaneers' running back coach.

He was promoted to the active roster on December 22, 2015. On September 6, 2016, he was released by the Buccaneers. Two days later, he was signed to the Buccaneers' practice squad.

On September 9, 2016, Spencer was placed on the reserve/retired list.

== Personal ==
Spencer is the youngest son of retired NFL running back Tim Spencer. Spencer's older brother, Cole, is an area scout with the Washington Redskins. During the 2015 NFL draft, Cole called on behalf of the Redskins to tell his younger brother that he was going to be drafted.
