= Curtis Grant =

American football player (born 1992)

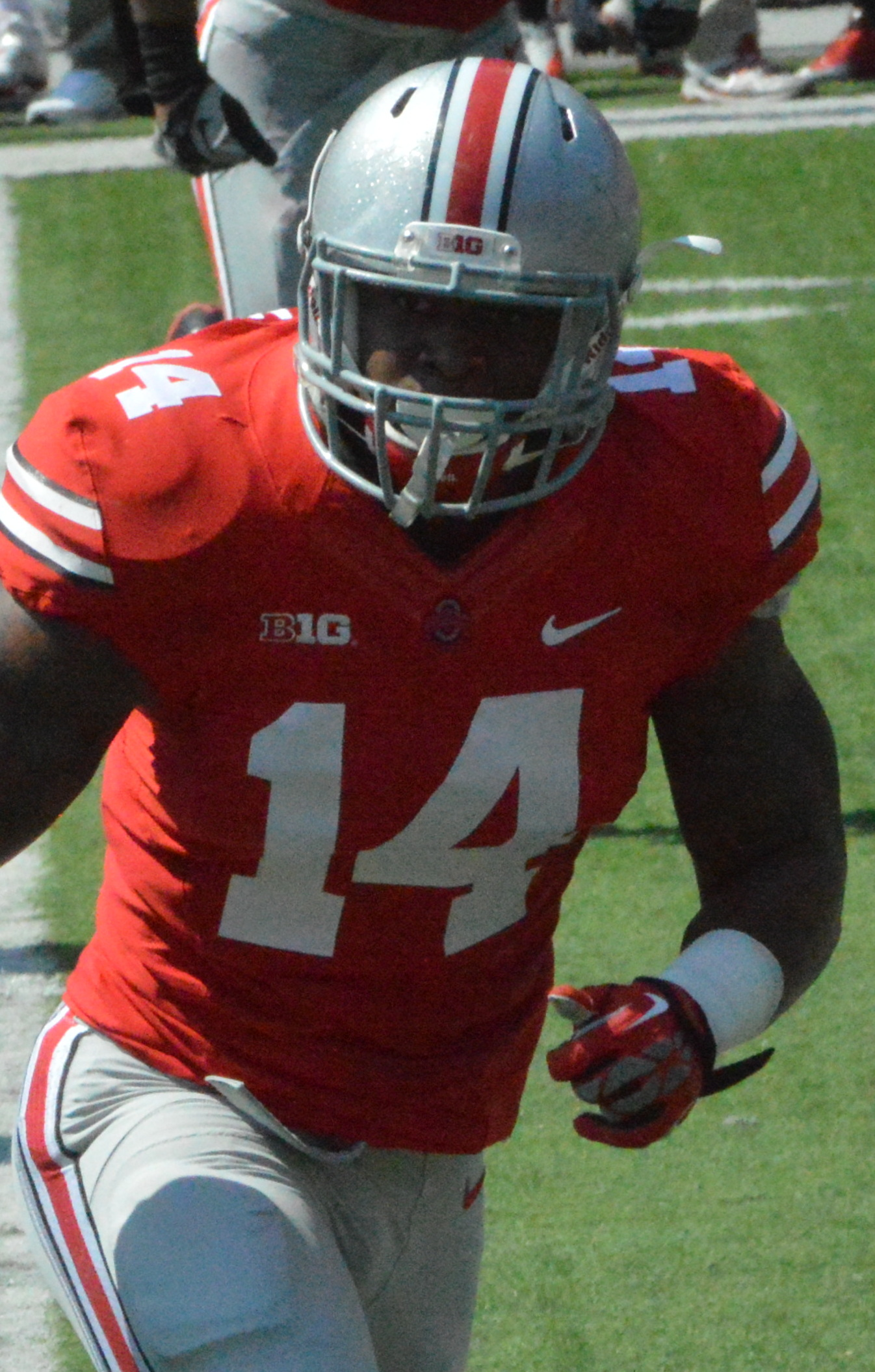
- Grant in 2014

No. 49
- Position: Linebacker

Personal information
- Born: December 28, 1992 (age 33); Richmond, Virginia, U.S.
- Listed height: 6 ft 2 in (1.88 m)
- Listed weight: 240 lb (109 kg)

Career information
- High school: Hermitage (Henrico, Virginia)
- College: Ohio State
- NFL draft: 2015: undrafted

Career history
- San Diego Chargers (2015)*; Atlanta Falcons (2015)*; Tennessee Titans (2016)*; Oakland Raiders (2016)*; San Francisco 49ers (2016)*; New York Giants (2017)
- * Offseason or practice squad member only

Awards and highlights
- CFP national champion (2014)

Career NFL statistics
- Total tackles: 18
- Fumble recoveries: 1
- Stats at Pro Football Reference

Curtis Grant Jr. (born December 28, 1992) is an American former professional football player who was a linebacker in the National Football League (NFL). He played college football for the Ohio State Buckeyes.

== Early life ==
A native of Richmond, Virginia, Grant attended Hermitage High School, where he was rated the No. 1 inside linebackers prospect by Rivals.com. He chose Ohio State over UNC, Florida, and Virginia.

== Professional career ==
=== San Diego Chargers ===
On May 2, 2015, Grant was signed by the San Diego Chargers as an undrafted free agent. On August 30, 2015, he was waived.

=== Atlanta Falcons ===
On December 15, 2015, Grant was signed to the Atlanta Falcons' practice squad.

=== Tennessee Titans ===
On April 1, 2016, Grant was signed by the Tennessee Titans. On September 2, 2016, he was released by the Titans as part of final roster cuts.

=== Oakland Raiders ===
On September 5, 2016, Grant was signed to the Raiders' practice squad. He was released by the Raiders on September 14, 2016.

=== San Francisco 49ers ===
On September 21, 2016, Grant was signed to the San Francisco 49ers' practice squad.

=== New York Giants ===
On January 12, 2017, Grant signed a reserve/future contract with the Giants. He was waived on September 2, 2017, and was signed to the Giants' practice squad the next day. He was promoted to the active roster on September 18, 2017. He was placed on injured reserve on November 27, 2017, after being carted off with a knee injury in Week 12.
