= Steve Miller (defensive lineman) =

American gridiron football player (born 1992)

No. 88
- Position: Defensive tackle

Personal information
- Born: February 28, 1992 (age 34); Canton, Ohio, U.S.
- Listed height: 6 ft 3 in (1.91 m)
- Listed weight: 256 lb (116 kg)

Career information
- College: Ohio State
- NFL draft: 2015: undrafted

Career history
- Carolina Panthers (2015); Toronto Argonauts (2016); Columbus Lions (2018); Carolina Cobras (2019); Spokane Shock (2020–2021)

Awards and highlights
- CFP national champion (2015)

Steve Miller (born February 28, 1992) is an American former football defensive end. He played college football for the Ohio State Buckeyes.
