= Damon Webb =

American gridiron football player (born 1995)

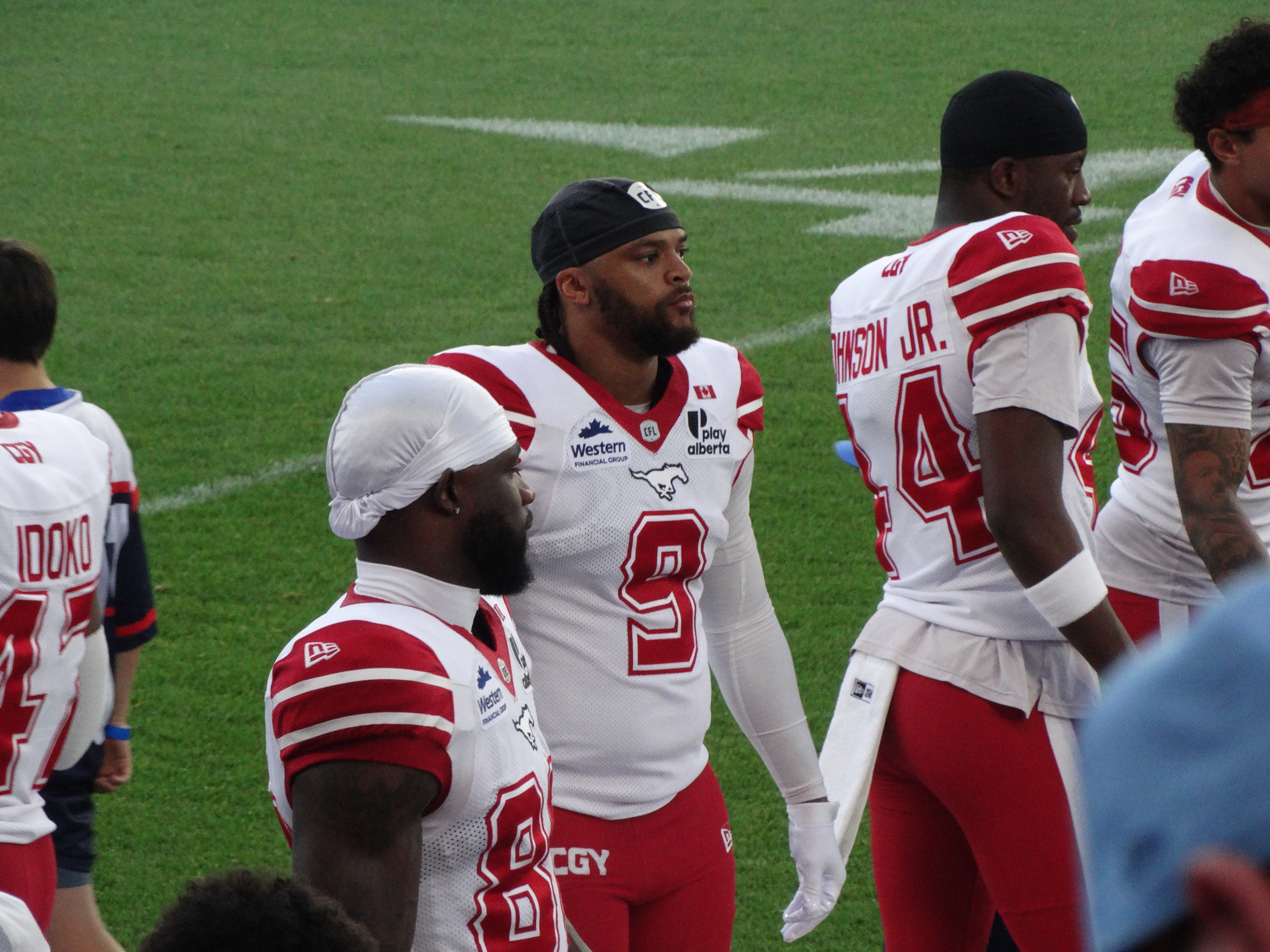
- Webb with the Calgary Stampeders in 2026

No. 9 – Calgary Stampeders
- Position: Defensive back
- Roster status: Active
- CFL status: American

Personal information
- Born: November 12, 1995 (age 30); Detroit, Michigan, U.S.
- Listed height: 5 ft 11 in (1.80 m)
- Listed weight: 205 lb (93 kg)

Career information
- High school: Cass Technical (Detroit)
- College: Ohio State
- NFL draft: 2018: undrafted

Career history
- Tennessee Titans (2018–2019)*; Saskatchewan Roughriders (2020–2022); Ottawa Redblacks (2022–2024); Calgary Stampeders (2025–present)
- * Offseason or practice squad member only

Awards and highlights
- CFL All-Star (2024); CFL East All-Star (2024); CFL West All-Star (2025)

Career CFL statistics as of 2026
- Games played: 87
- Total tackles: 328
- Interceptions: 12
- Defensive touchdowns: 4
- Stats at CFL.ca
- Stats at Pro Football Reference

Damon Webb (born November 25, 1995) is an American professional football defensive back for the Calgary Stampeders of the Canadian Football League (CFL). He played college football at Ohio State and was signed by the Tennessee Titans as an undrafted free agent in 2018.

== Early life and college ==
Damon Webb was born on November 25, 1995, in Detroit, Michigan. He played college football at Ohio State University, playing four seasons. He appeared in 35 games during his time with Ohio State, recording 131 tackles, four for a loss, six interceptions and two touchdowns. As a senior, he made five of his six career interceptions, placing second in the Big Ten Conference. In the 2017 Cotton Bowl, the final game of his college career, Webb returned an interception for a touchdown in a win over USC. For his efforts he earned Cotton Bowl MVP honors. He was named third-team All-Big Ten following the year.

== Professional career ==
Pre-draft measurables
| Height | Weight | Arm length | Hand span | Wingspan | 40-yard dash | 10-yard split | 20-yard split | Bench press |
|---|---|---|---|---|---|---|---|---|
| 5 ft 10 3/4 in (1.80 m) | 209 lb (95 kg) | 31 1/4 in (0.79 m) | 8 1/8 in (0.21 m) | 6 ft 0 1/2 in (1.84 m) | 4.61 s | 1.58 s | 2.69 s | 17 reps |
All values from NFL Combine/Pro Day

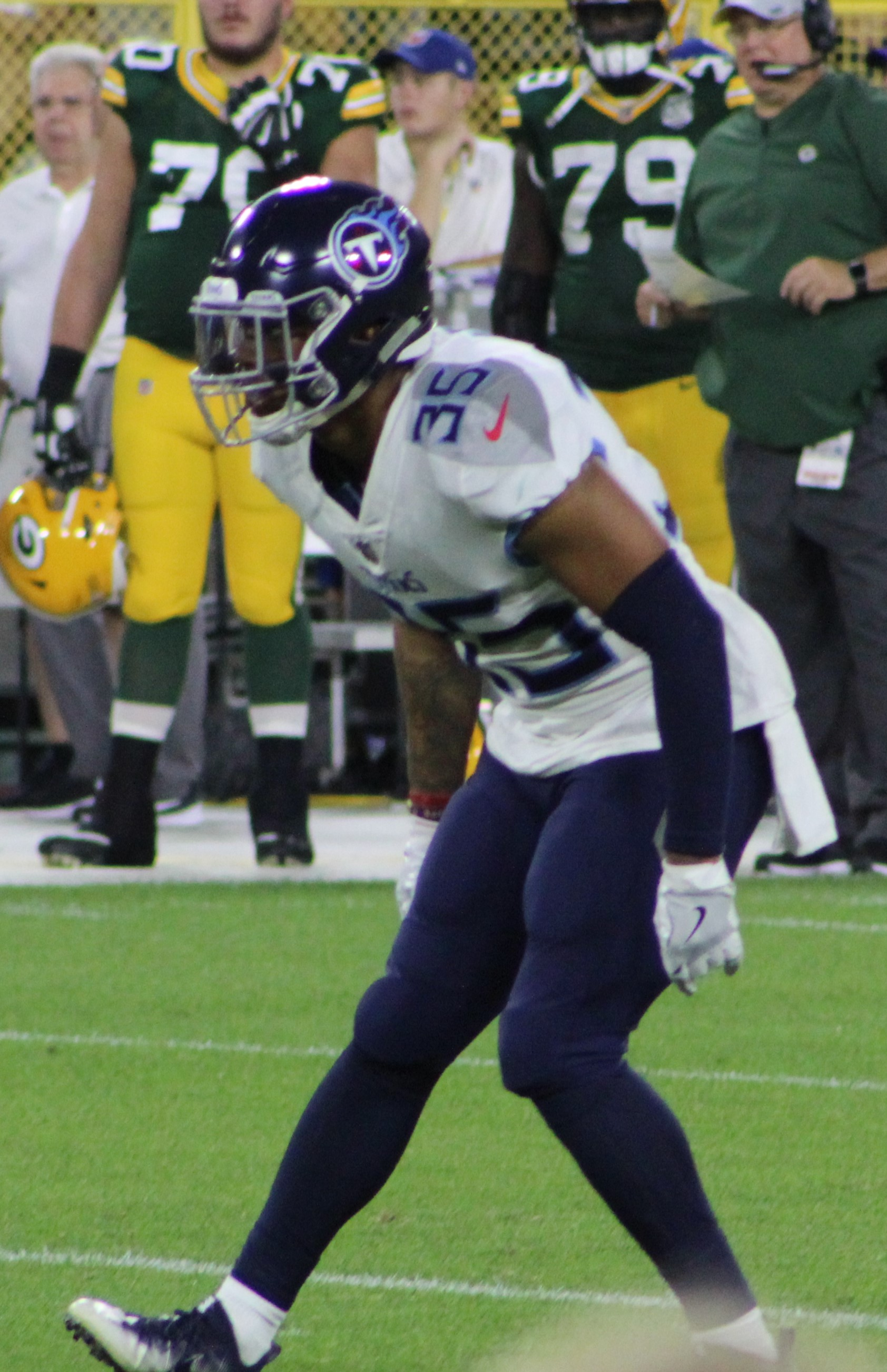
Webb with the Tennessee Titans in 2018

=== Tennessee Titans ===
After going unselected in the 2018 NFL draft, Webb was signed by the Tennessee Titans as an undrafted free agent. He played in four preseason games with the team, making five tackles and two pass deflections. He was released at roster cuts and re-signed to the practice squad the next day. He spent the whole season with their practice squad, before being released in July 2019.

=== Saskatchewan Roughriders ===
After going unsigned in 2019, Webb signed a contract with the Saskatchewan Roughriders of the Canadian Football League (CFL) in April 2020. He did not appear in any games during the season, as it was cancelled due to COVID-19. He was re-signed in February 2021. After beginning the season on the practice roster, he was promoted to the active team prior to their week 6 matchup with the Winnipeg Blue Bombers. Against the BC Lions two weeks later, he returned a fumble for a touchdown as time expired to seal a 31–24 win. He was released by the Riders on July 1, 2022, after playing in two games.

=== Ottawa Redblacks ===
Webb joined the Ottawa Redblacks for the 2022 season and played in nine games, recording 33 defensive tackles, one tackle on special teams and one interception. On February 1, 2023, Webb and Ottawa agreed to a one-year contract extension. He agreed to another one-year contract extension with the team on February 5, 2024. He became a free agent upon the expiry of his contract on February 11, 2025.

=== Calgary Stampeders ===
On February 11, 2025, it was announced that Webb had signed with the Calgary Stampeders.
