= Mickey Marotti =

American football coach

Current position
- Title: Assistant athletic director for football sports performance
- Team: Ohio State
- Conference: Big Ten

Biographical details
- Born: Ambridge, Pennsylvania, U.S.

Playing career
- 1984–1987: West Liberty
- Position: Fullback

Coaching career (HC unless noted)
- 1987–1988: Grove City HS (OH) (strength)
- 1987–1988: Ohio State (GA)
- 1989–1990: West Virginia (strength asst.)
- 1990–1998: Cincinnati (S&C)
- 1998–2005: Notre Dame (dir. of S&C)
- 2005–2011: Florida (dir. of S&C)
- 2012–present: Ohio State (assistant AD)

Accomplishments and honors

Awards
- NAIA All-Academic

Mickey Marotti is an American football coach, currently the assistant athletic director for football sports performance at Ohio State University. He served as a strength and conditioning coach at several programs for 33 years.

== Playing career ==
Marotti is a native of Ambridge, Pennsylvania. He went on to be a four-year letter winner as a fullback for West Liberty University, serving as a team captain in 1986 and winning first team NAIA All-Academic honors in 1987. He graduated in 1987 with a degree in exercise physiology.

== Education ==
In addition to his bachelor's degree in exercise physiology from West Liberty, Marotti also obtained a Master of Arts in strength and conditioning from Ohio State University and a Master of Science in sports medicine from West Virginia University.

== Coaching career ==
Marotti began his coaching career as a graduate assistant at Ohio State, where he first coached with Urban Meyer. After two seasons, he took a full-time position at West Virginia, where he spent two years as a strength assistant. Marotti then left for Cincinnati, where he spent seven season leading the Bearcats strength and conditioning.

He once again left Ohio, this time for South Bend, Indiana, when he became the director of strength and conditioning at Notre Dame in 1998. Marotti was reunited with Meyer during this stint. In 2005, when Meyer took over as head coach for Florida Marotti joined Meyer's coaching staff as director of strength and conditioning. At this time, The Gators found success and won two national championships and three SEC championships. Following Meyer's short retirement following the 2010 season, he stayed on with Will Muschamp for one season.

When Urban Meyer took over at Ohio State, Marotti returned to Ohio, where he was named assistant athletic director for football sports performance. Since then he has won another national title and three Big Ten titles. Following Meyer's second retirement in 2018, he remained part of the Ohio State coaching staff under Ryan Day.

Marotti has coached under:

- Earle Bruce, Ohio State
- John Cooper, Ohio State
- Bob Davie, Notre Dame
- Ryan Day, Ohio State
- Urban Meyer, Florida & Ohio State
- Rick Minter, Cincinnati
- Tim Murphy, Cincinnati
- Will Muschamp, Florida
- Don Nehlen, West Virginia
- Charlie Weis, Notre Dame
- Tyrone Willingham, Notre Dame

== Personal life ==
Marotti is married to his wife Susie. They have a daughter, Maddie and a son, Mitchell. Both of his children are graduates of Ohio State.
