= 2014 Michigan State Spartans football team =

American college football season

2014 Michigan State Spartans football

Cotton Bowl Classic champion

Cotton Bowl Classic, W 42–41 vs. Baylor
- Conference: Big Ten Conference
- East Division

Ranking
- Coaches: No. 5
- AP: No. 5
- Record: 11–2 (7–1 Big Ten)
- Head coach: Mark Dantonio (8th season)
- Co-offensive coordinators: Dave Warner (2nd season); Jim Bollman (2nd season)
- Offensive scheme: Pro-style
- Defensive coordinator: Pat Narduzzi (8th season)
- Base defense: 4–3
- Captains: Shilique Calhoun; Kurtis Drummond; Travis Jackson
- Home stadium: Spartan Stadium

2014 Big Ten Conference football standings
	Conf.			Overall
Team	W		L	W		L
East Division
No. 1 Ohio State x$#^	8	–	0	14	–	1
No. T–5 Michigan State	7	–	1	11	–	2
Maryland	4	–	4	7	–	6
Rutgers	3	–	5	8	–	5
Michigan	3	–	5	5	–	7
Penn State	2	–	6	7	–	6
Indiana	1	–	7	4	–	8
West Division
No. 13 Wisconsin x	7	–	1	11	–	3
Minnesota	5	–	3	8	–	5
Nebraska	5	–	3	9	–	4
Iowa	4	–	4	7	–	6
Illinois	3	–	5	6	–	7
Northwestern	3	–	5	5	–	7
Purdue	1	–	7	3	–	9
Championship: Ohio State 59, Wisconsin 0
# – College Football Playoff champion; ^ – College Football Playoff participant; $ – Conference champion; x – Division champion/co-champions; Rankings from AP Poll

The 2014 Michigan State Spartans football team represented Michigan State University in the East Division of the Big Ten Conference during the 2014 NCAA Division I FBS football season. Michigan State played their home games at Spartan Stadium in East Lansing, Michigan and were led by eighth-year head coach Mark Dantonio. The season marked a new division organization and the Spartans were members of the East Division.

The Spartans finished the season 11–2, 7–1 in Big Ten play to finish in second place in the East Division behind Ohio State who went on win the Inaugural College Football Playoff. Michigan State faced Baylor in the 2015 Cotton Bowl, which was part of the new New Year's Six Bowls, where they overcame a 20-point deficit in the fourth quarter to defeat Baylor 42–41.

== Offseason ==
=== 2014 NFL draft ===
One member of the 2013 Spartan football team was selected in the 2014 NFL draft

Round	Pick#	Team	Player	Position
1	24	Cincinnati Bengals	Darqueze Dennard	Corner Back

In addition, eight other former Spartans were taken as undrafted free agents:

Team	Player	Position
Carolina Panthers	Denicos Allen	Linebacker
Cincinnati Bengals	Isaiah Lewis	Safety
Cincinnati Bengals	Dan France	Offensive Line
Denver Broncos	Bennie Fowler	Wide Receiver
Houston Texans	Max Bullough	Linebacker
Indianapolis Colts	Tyler Hoover	Defensive End
New Orleans Saints	Micajah Reynolds	Defensive tackle
San Francisco 49ers	Fou Fonoti	Offensive Tackle

Michigan State remained one of only six teams to have had a player selected in each draft since the AFL/NFL merger.

=== Transfers out ===
Ezra Robinson

Noah Jones

=== Recruiting class ===
College recruiting
Name	Hometown	School	Height	Weight	Commit date
Byron Bullough; ATH	Traverse City, Michigan	St. Francis	6 ft 1 in (1.85 m)	200 lb (91 kg)	Aug 9, 2012
Byron Bullough; ATH	Recruit ratings: Scout: Rivals: 247Sports: ESPN:				
Deon Drake; ILB	Detroit, Michigan	Cass Tech	6 ft 1 in (1.85 m)	210 lb (95 kg)	Sep 23, 2012
Deon Drake; ILB	Recruit ratings: Scout: Rivals: 247Sports: ESPN:				
Chase Gianacakos; OT	St. Charles, Illinois	St. Charles	6 ft 6 in (1.98 m)	280 lb (130 kg)	Apr 1, 2013
Chase Gianacakos; OT	Recruit ratings: Scout: Rivals: 247Sports: ESPN:				
Brian Allen; C	Hinsdale, Illinois	Hinsdale Central	6 ft 1 in (1.85 m)	287 lb (130 kg)	Apr 20, 2013
Brian Allen; C	Recruit ratings: Scout: Rivals: 247Sports: ESPN:				
Enoch Smith, Jr. DT	Chicago, Illinois	Mount Carmel	6 ft 2 in (1.88 m)	270 lb (120 kg)	Apr 20, 2013
Enoch Smith, Jr. DT	Recruit ratings: Scout: Rivals: 247Sports: ESPN:				
Matt Sokol; TE	Rochester Hills, Michigan	Adams High	6 ft 5 in (1.96 m)	225 lb (102 kg)	May 13, 2013
Matt Sokol; TE	Recruit ratings: Scout: Rivals: 247Sports: ESPN:				
Chris Frey; OLB	Upper Arlington, Ohio	Upper Arlington High	6 ft 2 in (1.88 m)	215 lb (98 kg)	May 15, 2013
Chris Frey; OLB	Recruit ratings: Scout: Rivals: 247Sports: ESPN:				
Vayante Copeland; ATH	Dayton, Ohio	Thurgood Marshall	5 ft 11 in (1.80 m)	185 lb (84 kg)	Jun 16, 2013
Vayante Copeland; ATH	Recruit ratings: Scout: Rivals: 247Sports: ESPN:				
Jalen Watts-Jackson; CB	Orchard Lake, Michigan	St. Mary's Prep	5 ft 11 in (1.80 m)	175 lb (79 kg)	Jun 19, 2013
Jalen Watts-Jackson; CB	Recruit ratings: Scout: Rivals: 247Sports: ESPN:				
David Beedle; DT	Clarkston, Michigan	Clarkston High	6 ft 6 in (1.98 m)	285 lb (129 kg)	Jun 21, 2013
David Beedle; DT	Recruit ratings: Scout: Rivals: 247Sports: ESPN:				
Gerald Owens; FB	Westville, New Jersey	West Deptford High	6 ft 2 in (1.88 m)	248 lb (112 kg)	Jun 21, 2013
Gerald Owens; FB	Recruit ratings: Scout: Rivals: 247Sports: ESPN:				
Matt Morissey; S	Lincolnshire, Illinois	Aldai E. Stevenson	6 ft 3 in (1.91 m)	182 lb (83 kg)	Jul 15, 2013
Matt Morissey; S	Recruit ratings: Scout: Rivals: 247Sports: ESPN:				
Robert Bowers; DE	Columbus, Ohio	Walnut Ridge	6 ft 5 in (1.96 m)	210 lb (95 kg)	Aug 3, 2013
Robert Bowers; DE	Recruit ratings: Scout: Rivals: 247Sports: ESPN:				
Nick Padla; OT	Berrien Springs, Michigan	Berrien Springs High	6 ft 6 in (1.98 m)	269 lb (122 kg)	Sep 7, 2013
Nick Padla; OT	Recruit ratings: Scout: Rivals: 247Sports: ESPN:				
Jake Hartbarger; P	Whitehouse, Ohio	Anthony Wayne	6 ft 4 in (1.93 m)	195 lb (88 kg)	Sep 25, 2013
Jake Hartbarger; P	Recruit ratings: Scout: Rivals: 247Sports: ESPN:				
Madre London; RB	Fort Lauderdale, Florida	St. Thomas Aquinas	6 ft 1 in (1.85 m)	205 lb (93 kg)	Nov 4, 2013
Madre London; RB	Recruit ratings: Scout: Rivals: 247Sports: ESPN:				
Montez Sweat; TE	Stone Mountain, Georgia	Stephenson High	6 ft 6 in (1.98 m)	225 lb (102 kg)	Dec 5, 2013
Montez Sweat; TE	Recruit ratings: Scout: Rivals: 247Sports: ESPN:				
Montae Nicholson; S	Monroeville, Pennsylvania	Gateway	6 ft 3 in (1.91 m)	200 lb (91 kg)	Dec 19, 2013
Montae Nicholson; S	Recruit ratings: Scout: Rivals: 247Sports: ESPN:				
Craig Evans; DT	Sun Prairie, Wisconsin	Sun Prairie High	6 ft 3 in (1.91 m)	305 lb (138 kg)	Feb 3, 2014
Craig Evans; DT	Recruit ratings: Scout: Rivals: 247Sports: ESPN:				
Miguel Machado; OT	Pasadena, California	Pasadena C.C.	6 ft 6 in (1.98 m)	290 lb (130 kg)	Feb 5, 2014
Miguel Machado; OT	Recruit ratings: Scout: Rivals: 247Sports: ESPN:				
T.J. Harrell; ATH	Tampa, Florida	Tampa Catholic	6 ft 1 in (1.85 m)	207 lb (94 kg)	Feb 5, 2014
T.J. Harrell; ATH	Recruit ratings: Scout: Rivals: 247Sports: ESPN:				
Malik McDowell; DE	Southfield, Michigan	Southfield High	6 ft 6 in (1.98 m)	292 lb (132 kg)	Feb 5, 2014
Malik McDowell; DE	Recruit ratings: Scout: Rivals: 247Sports: ESPN:				
Overall recruit ranking: Scout: 19 Rivals: 22 247Sports: 25 ESPN: 29
Note: In many cases, Scout, Rivals, 247Sports, On3, and ESPN may conflict in their listings of height and weight.; In these cases, the average was taken. ESPN grades are on a 100-point scale.; Sources: "2014 Team Ranking". Rivals.com.

== Season ==
=== Schedule ===
Date	Time	Opponent	Rank	Site	TV	Result	Attendance
August 29	7:30 p.m.	No. 6 (FCS) Jacksonville State*	No. 8	Spartan Stadium; East Lansing, MI	BTN	W 45–7	75,127
September 6	6:30 p.m.	at No. 3 Oregon*	No. 7	Autzen Stadium; Eugene, OR (College GameDay)	FOX	L 27–46	59,456
September 20	12:00 p.m.	Eastern Michigan*	No. 11	Spartan Stadium; East Lansing, MI	BTN	W 73–14	73,846
September 27	12:00 p.m.	Wyoming*^{†}	No. 9	Spartan Stadium; East Lansing, MI	ESPN2	W 56–14	74,227
October 4	8:00 p.m.	No. 19 Nebraska	No. 10	Spartan Stadium; East Lansing, MI	ABC	W 27–22	75,923
October 11	3:30 p.m.	at Purdue	No. 8	Ross–Ade Stadium; West Lafayette, IN	ABC/ESPN2	W 45–31	40,217
October 18	3:30 p.m.	at Indiana	No. 8	Memorial Stadium; Bloomington, IN (Old Brass Spittoon)	ESPN	W 56–17	44,403
October 25	3:30 p.m.	Michigan	No. 8	Spartan Stadium; East Lansing, MI (Paul Bunyan Trophy)	ABC	W 35–11	76,331
November 8	8:00 p.m.	No. 14 Ohio State	No. 8	Spartan Stadium; East Lansing, MI (College GameDay)	ABC	L 37–49	76,409
November 15	8:00 p.m.	at Maryland	No. 12	Byrd Stadium; College Park, MD	BTN	W 37–15	51,802
November 22	12:00 p.m.	Rutgers	No. 11	Spartan Stadium; East Lansing, MI	BTN	W 45–3	70,902
November 29	3:30 p.m.	at Penn State	No. 10	Beaver Stadium; University Park, PA (Land Grant Trophy)	ABC/ESPN2	W 34–10	99,902
January 1, 2015	12:30 p.m.	vs. No. 5 Baylor*	No. 8	AT&T Stadium; Arlington, TX (Cotton Bowl Classic)	ESPN	W 42–41	71,464
*Non-conference game; ^{†}Homecoming; Rankings from AP / CFP Polls released prior to game; All times are in Eastern time

=== Game summaries ===
==== Jacksonville State ====
Jacksonville State at Michigan State

Team	1	2	3	4	Total
Jacksonville State	0	0	7	0	7
• No. 8 Michigan State	21	17	7	0	45

- Date: August 29th
- Location:
  Spartan Stadium
  East Lansing, MI
- Game start: 7:31 p.m.
- Elapsed time: 3:03
- Game attendance: 75,127
- Game weather: 75 °F (24 °C), Wind: 8 mph (13 km/h) SSE, Mostly Cloudy
- Referee: Ron Snodgrass
- TV announcers (BTN):
  Matt Devlin (Play-by-Play)
  Jim Miller (Analyst)
  Lisa Byington (Sideline)

Scoring summary
1	11:57	MSU	Tony Lippett 64 yard pass from Connor Cook (Michael Geiger kick)	MSU 7–0
1	10:23	MSU	Tonny Lippett 71 yard pass from Connor Cook (Michael Geiger kick)	MSU 14–0
1	3:35	MSU	AJ Troup 17 yard pass from Connor Cook (Michael Geiger kick)	MSU 21–0
2	12:43	MSU	Nick Hill 17 yard run (Michael Geiger kick)	MSU 28–0
2	5:01	MSU	Nick Hill 8 yard run (Michael Geiger kick)	MSU 35–0
2	0:00	MSU	Michael Geiger 35 yard field goal	MSU 38–0
3	11:37	JSU	Markis Merrill 9 yard pass from Max Shortell (Connor Rouleau kick)	MSU 38–7
3	2:18	MSU	Tyler O'Connor 3 yard run (Michael Geiger)	MSU 45–7

The Spartans opened the 2014 season under the lights at Spartan Stadium against FCS opponent Jacksonville State.

The Spartans scored on their first drive, as Tony Lippett caught a 64-yard touchdown pass from a scrambling Connor Cook. During the play, Jacksonville State safety Folo Johnson hit Cook directly on the knee, and Cook was slow to get up, causing an injury scare. However, Cook would return the next drive and throw to a wide open Tony Lippett for a 71-yard touchdown bomb. Through the first 2 possessions, Tony Lippett had 3 receptions for a total of 146 yards, and 2 TDs. Several possessions later, AJ Troup made a spectacular catch in the bottom left-hand corner of the end-zone on a 17-yard pass from Connor Cook to put Michigan State up 21–0 going into the 2nd quarter.

Nick Hill scored on a 17-yard run during the first drive of the 2nd quarter, putting Michigan State ahead 28–0. After getting a stop the next Jacksonville State possession, the Spartans scored again the following drive, this time on another Nick Hill scamper, this time from 8 yards out, effectively putting the nail in the coffin before halftime, 35–0. Michael Geiger would add a 35-yard field goal as the clock expired, putting State ahead 38–0 at the half.

Aside from a Tyler O'Connor 3-yard rushing touchdown and a 9-yard Max Shortell touchdown pass to Markis Merrill (the only points for JSU), there was little to no offense in the second half. Michigan State won the ball game 45–7.

The Spartan defense was dominant all game, only allowing 1 touchdown, recording 4 sacks, and 3 interceptions (Kurtis Drummond, Darian Hicks, and Nick Thompson respectively). The defense also held Jacksonville State to just 22 yards rushing. Tony Lippett finished the game with 4 catches for 167 yards and 2 touchdowns; no Michigan State receiver recorded a 100-yard receiving game the entire previous season. Connor Cook was nearly perfect, completing 12 out of 13 passes for 285 yards and 3 touchdowns (all of which came in the 1st quarter).

==== Oregon ====
Michigan State at Oregon

Team	1	2	3	4	Total
No. 7 Michigan State	0	24	3	0	27
• No. 3 Oregon	8	10	14	14	46

- Date: September 6th
- Location:
  Autzen Stadium
  Eugene, Oregon
- Game start: 6:35 p.m.
- Elapsed time: 3:26
- Game attendance: 59,456
- Game weather: 91 °F (33 °C), Wind 6 mph (9.7 km/h) NW, Overcast
- Referee: Michael Cannon
- TV announcers (FOX):
  Gus Johnson (Play-by-Play)
  Charles Davis (Analyst)
  Molly McGrath (Sideline)

Scoring summary
1	3:39	ORE	Thomas Tyner 1 yard run (Taylor Alie pass to DeForest Buckner for 2-point conversion)	ORE 8–0
2	13:37	ORE	Matt Wogan 28 yard field goal	ORE 11–0
2	10:57	MSU	Jeremy Langford 16 yard run (Michael Geiger kick)	ORE 11–7
2	10:12	ORE	Devon Allen 70 yard pass from Marcus Mariota (Matt Wogan kick)	ORE 18–7
2	6:40	MSU	Michael Geiger 34 yard field goal	ORE 18–10
2	2:26	MSU	Tony Lippett 7 yard pass from Connor Cook (Michael Geiger kick)	ORE 18–17
2	0:18	MSU	Josiah Price 7 yard pass from Connor Cook (Michael Geiger kick)	MSU 18–24
3	10:55	MSU	Michael Geiger 42 yard field goal	MSU 18–27
3	4:23	ORE	Devon Allen 24 yard pass from Marcus Mariota (Matt Wogan kick)	MSU 25–27
3	1:34	ORE	Keanon Lowe 37 yard pass from Marcus Mariota (Matt Wogan kick)	ORE 32–27
4	14:19	ORE	Royce Freeman 38 yard run (Matt Wogan kick)	ORE 39–27
4	1:25	ORE	Royce Freeman 14 yard run (Matt Wogan kick)	ORE 46–27

Following their 45–7 victory over Jacksonville State, the Spartans would travel to Eugene to face the Oregon Ducks. The last meeting between the 2 teams took place in 1999, when the Spartans defeated the Ducks 27–20 en route to a 10-win season.

The first quarter was a defensive struggle until a Connor Cook pass was intercepted by Ducks defensive back Erick Dargan, who returned the ball 36 yards to the Michigan State 39 yard line. The Oregon offense, led by Heisman Trophy front runner Marcus Mariota, was quick to capitalize, scoring on a 1-yard Thomas Tyner run. The Ducks converted for 2 points to go ahead 8–0. Michigan State would be unable to answer, and Oregon would have the ball to start the 2nd quarter.

Oregon would add to their lead with a Matt Wogan 28-yard field goal, putting them ahead 11–0. The Spartans would respond with a touchdown on their following drive, as Connor Cook and Jeremy Langford methodically led the offense down the field. Cook was 3/4 on the drive for 45 yards and Langford ran the ball 4 times for 31 yards, capping the drive off with a 16-yard run, putting the score at 11–7, Oregon. Oregon would answer immediately, taking only 2 plays to score. Marcus Mariota threw to a wide open Devon Allen for a 70-yard touchdown pass, strengthening their lead to 18–7. Michael Geiger would make a 34-yard field goal to pull State within 8, 18–10. The following Oregon possession ended with Lawrence Thomas and Marcus Rush recording back to back sacks. Michigan State would score on the following possession on a 7-yard pass from Connor Cook to Tony Lippett, to bring the score to 18–17 Oregon. The MSU defense would stand tall on the following Oregon possession, forcing a punt and giving the offense an opportunity to take the lead going into halftime. Connor Cook would lead the offense on a 6 play, 66 yard drive which ended when Cook threw to an open Josiah Price in the back of the end-zone, giving Michigan State a 24–18 lead at the half.

After a Michael Geiger 42-yard field goal in the 3rd quarter, giving them a 27–18 lead, Michigan State would fail to score the remainder of the game; Oregon would score 28 unanswered points. Michigan State had an opportunity to get back into the game late in Oregon territory, but a Connor Cook pass was deflected and intercepted by All-American candidate Ifo Ekpre-Olomu. Tony Lippett finished the game with a career-high 11 receptions for 133 yards and a touchdown. The Spartans would lose 46–27, their worst loss since losing to Notre Dame 31–13 during the 2011 season. It was also the most points the Michigan State defense had surrendered since losing 49–7 to Alabama in the 2011 Capital One Bowl.

==== Eastern Michigan ====
Eastern Michigan at Michigan State

Team	1	2	3	4	Total
Eastern Michigan	0	0	7	7	14
• No. 11 Michigan State	28	21	10	14	73

- Date: September 20th
- Location:
  Spartan Stadium
  East Lansing, MI
- Game start: 12:01 p.m.
- Elapsed time: 3:16
- Game attendance: 73,846
- Game weather: 68 °F (20 °C), Wind 14 mph (23 km/h) SW, Partly Cloudy
- Referee: Greg Blum
- TV announcers (BTN):
  Eric Collins (Play-by-Play)
  Jim Miller (Analyst)
  Rebecca Haarlow (Sideline)

Scoring summary
1	11:41	MSU	Connor Cook 4 yard run (Michael Geiger kick)	MSU 7–0
1	8:03	MSU	Jeremy Langford 21 yard run (Michael Geiger kick)	MSU 14–0
1	7:49	MSU	Tony Lippett 23 yard pass from Connor Cook (Michael Geiger kick)	MSU 21–0
1	2:18	MSU	Tony Lippett 8 yard pass from Connor Cook (Michael Geiger kick)	MSU 28–0
2	11:04	MSU	AJ Troup 33 yard pass from Tyler O'Connor (Michael Geiger kick)	MSU 35–0
2	5:17	MSU	Delton Williams 1 yard run (Michael Geiger kick)	MSU 42–0
2	2:40	MSU	R.J. Shelton 6 yard run (Michael Geiger kick)	MSU 49–0
3	9:42	MSU	Nick Hill 4 yard run (Michael Geiger kick)	MSU 56–0
3	7:18	EMU	Tyler Allen 43 yard pass from Rob Bolden (Dylan Mulder kick)	MSU 56–7
3	2:26	MSU	Michael Geiger 30 yard field goal	MSU 59–7
4	14:19	EMU	Tyreese Russell 9 yard pass from Rob Bolden (Dylan Mulder kick)	MSU 59–14
4	8:49	MSU	Delton Williams 7 yard run (Michael Geiger kick)	MSU 66–14
4	6:05	MSU	Delton Williams 80 yard run (Michael Geiger kick)	MSU 73–14

Following a bye week, the Spartans played at home for the first time in nearly a month against in-state MAC opponent Eastern Michigan. The previous meeting between the 2 schools was during the 2012 season. Michigan State won 23–7, despite trailing at halftime.

The Spartan defense forced a punt on the opening drive, and Macgarrett Kings gave the Spartan offense good field position after a 43-yard punt return. Several plays later, Connor Cook scored on a 4-yard rushing touchdown to give MSU a 7–0 lead. After another Eastern 3 and out, Michigan State scored again the following possession as Jeremy Langford made a defender miss on his way to the end-zone for a 21-yard touchdown run. Eastern Michigan then fumbled the ball in their own territory and on the very first play for Michigan State, Connor Cook threw to a wide open Tony Lippett for a 21-yard touchdown. The score was 21–0 MSU only 5 minutes into the game. The defense forced Eastern to punt again, and once again, the offense took advantage, as Connor Cook hit Tony Lippett on the run for an 8-yard touchdown pass, giving Michigan State a 28–0 1st quarter lead.

The opening drive of the 2nd quarter was capped off with a 33-yard strike from Tyler O'Connor to AJ Troup, strengthening Michigan State's lead to 35–0. The Spartan defense would not allow Eastern Michigan to move the ball, forcing yet another 3 and out. However, Eastern was finally able to stop the Spartan offense the following drive, after giving up touchdowns on 5 consecutive possessions. Unfortunately, Eagles return man Tyler Allen muffed the ensuing punt, and Michigan State recovered the ball at the Eastern Michigan 7 yard line. Several plays later, Delton Williams would score 1 yard out, putting the Spartans up 42–0. After trading possessions, Eastern Michigan had the ball at their own 15 yard line, when RJ Williamson picked off EMU QB Rob Bolden, with a return of 6 yards. R.J. Shelton would score the following play to increase the Spartan lead to 49. MSU led 49–0 at the half. Michigan State also led Eastern in total yards 320 to 1 at the half.

Michigan State received the ball to start the 2nd half and scored on 9 play, 61 yard drive that ended with a Nick Hill 4 yard touchdown run, giving the Spartans a 56–0 lead. Eastern would finally score their first points the following possession after a Rob Bolden pass to Tyler Allen that went for 43 yards, cutting the State lead to 49. Michigan State would be forced to punt the ball, but turnovers continued to plague Eastern Michigan, as they muffed yet another punt, which was again recovered by the Spartans. Michael Geiger would make a 30-yard field goal to increase the lead to 59–7. Tyler O'Connor would throw an interception from his own end-zone, giving Eastern great field position to start the 4th.

Following the Tyler O'Connor interception, Rob Bolden would find Tyreese Russell for a 9-yard touchdown pass to put the score at 59–14 MSU. After forcing a Michigan State punt, Eastern Michigan would continue to shoot itself in the foot, as they fumbled the ball in their own territory again. The Spartans took advantage and Delton Williams scored his 2nd touchdown of the day from 7 yards out. He would follow that with his 3rd touchdown the next possession, taking it to the end-zone on an 80-yard run. Michigan State would win by the final score of 73–14

This was the first time since 1989 when Michigan State defeated Northwestern 76–14, that Michigan State scored over 70 points in a game. Delton Williams finished with 10 carries for 103 yards and 3 touchdowns, and the Spartans went deep into the depth chart, using 5 different QBs. Eastern Michigan finished the game with 6 turnovers, which included 5 fumbles and 1 interception. They have yet to defeat the Spartans through 10 meetings.

==== Wyoming ====
Wyoming at Michigan State

Team	1	2	3	4	Total
Wyoming	7	7	0	0	14
• No. 9 Michigan State	21	21	7	7	56

- Date: September 27th
- Location:
  Spartan Stadium
  East Lansing, MI
- Game start: 12:01 p.m.
- Elapsed time: 3:07
- Game attendance: 74,227
- Game weather: 70 °F (21 °C), Wind 5 mph (8.0 km/h) ESE, bright sunshine
- Referee: Michael Cannon
- TV announcers (ESPN2):
  Bob Wischusen (Play-by-Play)
  Matt Millen (Analyst)
  Quint Kessenich (Sideline)

Scoring summary
1	11:11	MSU	Connor Cook 1-yard run (Michael Geiger kick)	MSU 7–0
1	5:47	MSU	Tony Lippett 19-yard pass from Connor Cook (Michael Geiger)	MSU 14–0
1	2:40	WYO	Shaun Wick 57-yard run (Stuart Williams kick)	MSU 14–7
1	1:19	MSU	Keith Mumphery 33-yard run (Michael Geiger kick)	MSU 21–7
2	13:53	MSU	Josiah Price 19-yard pass from Connor Cook (Michael Geiger kick)	MSU 28–7
2	4:11	MSU	Keith Mumphery 6-yard pass from Tyler O'Connor (Michael Geiger kick)	MSU 35–7
2	1:24	MSU	Delton Williams 4-yard run (Michael Geiger kick)	MSU 42–7
2	0:42	WYO	J.D. Krill 4-yard pass from Colby Kirkegaard (Stuart Williams kick)	MSU 42–14
3	4:02	MSU	Jeremy Langford 29-yard run (Michael Geiger kick)	MSU 49–14
4	12:08	MSU	Tyler O'Connor 12-yard run (Michael Geiger)	MSU 56–14

Succeeding their 59-point victory over Eastern Michigan, the Spartans took on the Wyoming Cowboys of the Mountain West Conference. The previous meeting between the two programs was during the 1977 season.

Wyoming won the coin toss and deferred until the second half. The Spartan offense drove deep into the red-zone, being forced to go for it on fourth down. Connor Cook scored on a 1-yard rush, giving Michigan State a 7–0 lead. The MSU defense would force a punt, and the offense would go back to work, going 69 yards in 10 plays, capping the drive off with a 19-yard touchdown reception by Tony Lippett. Wyoming would answer with a 57-yard touchdown by scat back Shaun Wick, putting the score at 14–7 MSU. Michigan State would not take long to respond, needing only 3 plays to score off of a 33-yard rushing touchdown by Keith Mumphery. Wyoming would fumble on the following possession and MSU would have the ball in Wyoming territory and 21–7 lead going into the 2nd quarter.

The Spartan offense scored quickly on a 19-yard pass from Connor Cook to Josiah Price, with Michigan State's lead blossoming to 28–7. Wyoming drove the field to the MSU 25-yard line, where they were forced to kick a field goal from 42 yards. The field goal attempt was blocked by Shilique Calhoun. Darian Hicks recovered the ball and returned it to the Wyoming 35-yard line. Several plays later, Tyler O'Connor found Keith Mumphery on a 6-yard touchdown pass, strengthening the MSU lead to 35–7. Kurtis Drummond picked off Wyoming QB Colby Kirkegaard and returned the ball to the Wyoming 25-yard line. Delton Williams scored on a 4-yard run several plays later; 42–7 Michigan State. Wyoming responded with a Colby Kirkegaard-J.D. Krill 4-yard touchdown connection. The score was 42–14 Michigan State at the half.

Wyoming fumbled the football on the very first play of the second half, giving the Michigan State offense great field position; however, the offense failed to score, turning the ball over on downs. The 3rd quarter would be a struggle for both offenses, with the only score coming on a Jeremy Langford 29 yard touchdown run. Michigan State would add to its lead in the 4th, as a Tyler O'Connor scramble for 12 yards would put them ahead 56–14, which would end up being the final score. Ten different ball carriers notched at least one carry to rack up 338 rushing yards for the Spartans, and Keith Mumphery became the first Spartan receiver since Keshawn Martin in 2011 to record both a rushing touchdown and a receiving touchdown in the same game. With this victory came the end of the non-conference schedule for Michigan State, as they would be opening conference play the next week, taking on Nebraska.

==== Nebraska ====
Nebraska at Michigan State

Team	1	2	3	4	Total
No. 19 Nebraska	0	0	3	19	22
• No. 10 Michigan State	7	10	10	0	27

- Date: October 4th
- Location:
  Spartan Stadium
  East Lansing, MI
- Game start: 8:14 p.m.
- Elapsed time: 3:54
- Game attendance: 75,923
- Game weather: 42 °F (6 °C), Wind 12 mph (19 km/h) WSW, Light Rain
- Referee: John O'Neill
- TV announcers (ABC):
  Chris Fowler (Play-by-Play)
  Kirk Herbstreit (Analyst)
  Heather Cox (Sideline)

Scoring summary
1	8:22	MSU	Tony Lippett 55 yard pass from Connor Cook (Michael Geiger)	MSU 7=0
2	13:48	MSU	Jeremy Langford 31 yard run (Michael Geiger kick)	MSU 14–0
2	4:32	MSU	Michael Geiger 28 yard field goal	MSU 17–0
3	9:18	MSU	Michael Geiger 27 yard field goal	MSU 20–0
3	6:12	NEB	Drew Brown 40 yard field goal	MSU 20–3
3	2:02	MSU	Tony Lippett 32 yard run (Michael Geiger kick)	MSU 27–3
4	12:49	NEB	Ameer Abdullah 2 yard run (2 point conversion failed)	MSU 27–9
4	4:10	NEB	Ameer Abdullah 1 yard run (Drew Brown kick)	MSU 27–16
4	3:22	NEB	De'Mornay Person-El 62 yard punt return (2 point conversion failed)	MSU 27–22

Michigan State would open their conference schedule against former Legends Division rival Nebraska. The Spartans picked up their first victory ever over the Cornhuskers the previous season, in a 41–28 victory in which Nebraska turned over the ball 5 times. Turnovers would again be a factor in this game due to the wet and cold weather conditions.

Michigan State won the coin toss and chose to receive the ball. On the 2nd play of the first possession, a Connor Cook pass was deflected at the line of scrimmage and intercepted by Randy Gregory, an All-Conference lineman for the Huskers. The Nebraska offense would have great field position at the MSU 30. The Michigan State defense would come up big after a critical mistake on offense for the Spartans, putting Nebraska out of field goal range and forcing them to punt. Michigan State would be forced to punt themselves the next possession; Nebraska would also be forced to punt following that after Ed Davis sacked Husker QB Tommy Armstrong on 3rd down. The Spartans would finally open the scoring on the following possession, as Tony Lippett made a 55-yard finger-tip catch and run touchdown reception, giving Michigan State a 7–0 lead. Neither offense would be able to effectively move the ball the rest of the quarter.

Following a Nebraska punt from their own 7 yard line and a 19-yard return by Macgarrett Kings, the Spartan offense would have solid field position. MSU would strike on the very first play, as Jeremy Langford ran for a 31-yard touchdown to give them a 14–0 lead. The rest of the 2nd quarter would be marred by turnovers: Nebraska would be forced to punt; however, the following MSU possession, Jeremy Langford would fumble the ball in MSU territory giving the Huskers great position again. Much like after the Cook interception in the 1st quarter, the Spartan defense would not allow Nebraska to score, forcing a 3 and out. However, the windy conditions would have an effect on the punt return, as Macgarrett Kings misjudged where the ball would land and muffed the catch, which was recovered by Nebraska at the MSU 24 yard line. Nebraska proceeded to drive all the way to the MSU 8 yard line, only for Ameer Abdullah to fumble the ball. Shilique Calhoun would make the recovery and return it to the MSU 45 yard line. Michigan State would add a Michael Geiger 28-yard field goal to give them a 17–0 lead at halftime.

A few possessions into the 3rd quarter, Marcus Rush would force a fumble and the offense would take over at the Nebraska 15 yard line, where they would be forced to settle for a field goal, strengthening the Michigan State lead to 20. Nebraska would finally score on their next possession, after a Drew Brown 40-yard field goal would make the game 20–3 MSU. The Spartans would answer that with a Tony Lippett 32 yard rush touchdown on a double reverse, giving them a 27–3 lead. Michigan State would have a 24 lead heading into the 4th quarter.

Nebraska would score on their first possession of the 4th quarter on a 2-yard Ameer Abdullah touchdown run. The Huskers chose to go for 2 points but failed to convert. The score was 27–9 MSU. The Spartan offense cooled off considerably in the 4th, having to punt on their next 2 possessions. Nebraska would score again following a pass interference call against Trae Waynes on another short, 1 yard Ameer Abdullah run, cutting the Spartan lead to 11; 27–16 MSU. The following Michigan State possession, the Spartans were forced to punt, which Nebraska would take advantage of off a 62-yard De'Mornay Pierson-El touchdown return to put Nebraska within 5 points, 27–22. Michigan State would recover the onside kick attempt, but Michael Geiger would miss a 36-yard field goal attempt. Nebraska would have one last chance to complete a major upset and comeback. Following an incomplete pass, Tommy Armstrong would find Alonzo Moore for a huge 43 yard gain, putting them in MSU territory at the 37 yard line. However, Trae Waynes would make a huge play, getting his 2nd interception of the night and ensuring a 27–22 Michigan State victory.

With the victory, Michigan State recorded its 10th straight conference win, and its second straight victory over Nebraska after losing the previous 7 meetings. The Spartans and Cornhuskers combined for 7 turnovers total ( 2 fumbles and 1 interception for MSU; 2 fumbles and 2 interceptions for Nebraska). Tony Lippett had his 7th straight game with a touchdown catch, dating back to the Big Ten Championship Game. The Spartan defense recorded 5 sacks and despite allowing 2 touchdown runs, held the potent Nebraska rushing attack led by Heisman hopeful running back Ameer Abdullah to just 47 yards on 37 carries; Abdullah had recorded over 100 yards (all-purpose) in 6 straight games coming into this game.

==== Purdue ====
Michigan State at Purdue

Team	1	2	3	4	Total
• No. 8 Michigan State	14	10	14	7	45
Purdue	3	14	0	14	31

- Date: October 11th
- Location:
  Ross–Ade Stadium
  West Lafayette, IN
- Game start: 3:42 p.m.
- Elapsed time: 3:28
- Game attendance: 40,217
- Game weather: 56 °F (13 °C), Wind 8 mph (13 km/h) NE, Sunny
- Referee: Todd Geerlings
- TV announcers (ABC / ESPN2):
  Mike Patrick (Play-by-Play)
  Ed Cunningham (Analyst)
  Jeannine Edwards (Sideline)

Scoring summary
1	11:44	MSU	Tony Lippett 39 yard pass from Connor Cook (Michael Geiger kick)	MSU 7–0
1	7:25	PUR	Paul Griggs 36 yard field goal	MSU 7–3
1	3:47	MSU	Nick Hill 2 yard run (Michael Geiger kick)	MSU 14–3
2	11:37	MSU	Josiah Price 2 yard pass from Connor Cook (Michael Geiger kick)	MSU 21–3
2	9:00	PUR	Akeem Hunt 3 yard run (Paul Griggs kick)	MSU 21–10
2	5:19	MSU	Michael Geiger 42 yard field goal	MSU 24–10
2	1:43	PUR	B.J. Knauf 9 yard pass from Austin Appleby (Paul Griggs kick)	MSU 24–17
3	7:16	MSU	Aaron Burbridge 13 yard pass from Connor Cook (Michael Geiger kick)	MSU 31–17
3	4:49	MSU	Nick Hill 4 yard run (Michael Geiger kick)	MSU 38–17
4	8:49	PUR	Akeem Hunt 52 yard run (Paul Griggs kick)	MSU 38–24
4	6:19	PUR	Akeem Hunt 3 yard run (Paul Griggs kick)	MSU 38–31
4	1:22	MSU	Darrien Harris 15 yard interception return (Michael Geiger kick)	MSU 45–31

Michigan State traveled to West Lafayette for the first time since 2009. The Spartans came into the game having won the previous five meetings against the Boilermakers. Michigan State received the ball to open the game and quickly capitalized with a 75-yard scoring drive capped with 39 yard TD pass from Connor Cook to Tony Lippett. Purdue responded with a 58-yard drive which resulted in a 36-yard Paul Griggs field goal. MSU's ensuing drive resulted in another TD for the Spartans. Nick Hill ran for a two touchdown giving MSU a 14–3 lead. Purdue couldn't get anything going and quickly punted the ball back to State, who finished the quarter with the ball.

The second quarter began with the continuation of the Spartan drive. MSU finished the drive with a two-yard touchdown pass from Connor Cook to Josiah Price, giving them a 21–3 lead. Purdue was able to respond on the next drive when Keyante Green ran for a big 36 yard gain, placing the ball at the MSU 16 yard line. Two plays later Purdue would get a touchdown on a 13-yard pass from Austin Appleby to Danny Anthrop. MSU's next drive started off with a 30-yard run by Delton Williams, giving State the ball inside Purdue territory. The drive would ultimately reach the Boilermaker 25 yard line before stalling and ending with a 23-yard Michael Geiger field goal. Purdue responded again by driving down the field for another touchdown, a 9-yard pass from Applebee to B.J. Knauf. MSU attempted to finish the half by adding additional points, but a 44-yard Geiger field goal was missed. The half ended with MSU leading 24–17.

The second half began with Purdue receiving the opening kick. Their first drive ended with a punt after a three and out. MSU's offense again moved the ball down the field and again scored a TD after Aaron Burbridge caught a tough pass in the back of the end zone, advancing the lead to 31–17. Another Purdue three and out gave MSU the ball at the Purdue 47. On the first play of the drive, Nick Hill ran 37 yards to the 10 yard line. Two plays later Hill would run for a four-yard touchdown, giving State a 38–17 lead. The next two combined drives resulted in punts by each team, resulting with Purdue in possession of the ball trailing 38–17 going into the fourth.

The fourth quarter began with Purdue desperately trying to get back into the ball game. After a successful fourth down conversion on 4th and 11, Austin Applebee fumbled the ball after a missed handoff. MSU defense end Shilique Calhoun recovered the ball on the Spartan 49 yard line. State looked poised for another scoring opportunity after they were able to move the ball to the Purdue 21, but a Cook interception (Frankie Williams) ended the drive. With a breath of new life Purdue quickly scored on a 52-yard run by Akeem Hunt, closing the score to 38–24. A quick three resulted in an apparent MSU punt attempt with a little of 7:30 to play. Instead of punting, DT Lawrence attempted a run on a fake punt attempt. The attempt gained only one yard of the needed six, giving Purdue the ball at the MSU 30 yard line. Three plays later Purdue scored another TD on an Akeem Hunts three yard run, bringing the deficit to seven with 6:19 remaining. MSU found moderate success on the next drive, getting out to the Purdue 47 before stalling. Mike Sadler was able to pin Purdue at their five-yard after a 42-yard punt. After converting a fourth down, Purdue found themselves with a third and eight. Shilique Calhoun was able to get pressure on Appleby which forced him to throw an errant pass to the flat, which was intercepted by linebacker Darien Harris for a 15-yard pick six. MSU led with 1:22 remaining 45–31. Purdue attempted on last scoring drive, but the MSU defense forced a four and out which essentially ended the game.

The win made it six wins in a row against Purdue. Connor Cook finished the game 19/37 in passing for 238 yards, three touchdowns and one interception. Jeremy Langford rushed for 104 yards, his fourth game in a row over 100 yards. Tony Lippett led MSU receivers with seven receptions for 138 yards and a touchdown.

==== Indiana ====
Michigan State at Indiana
(Old Brass Spittoon)

Team	1	2	3	4	Total
• No. 8 Michigan State	7	21	7	21	56
Indiana	3	14	0	0	17

- Date: October 18th
- Location:
  Memorial Stadium
  Bloomington, IN
- Game start: 3:30
- Elapsed time: 3:33
- Game attendance: 44,403
- Game weather: 54 °F (12 °C), Wind 9 mph (14 km/h) NW, Cloudy
- Referee: Shawn Smith
- TV announcers (ESPN):
  Mike Patrick (Play-by-Play)
  Ed Cunningham (Analyst)
  Jeannine Edwards (Sideline)

Scoring summary
1	9:56	MSU	Jeremy Langford 32 yard run (Michael Geiger kick)	MSU 7–0
1	2:41	IND	Griffin Oakes 27 yard field goal	MSU 7–3
2	12:21	MSU	Josiah Price 10 yard pass from Connor Cook (Michael Geiger kick)	MSU 14–3
2	12:07	IND	Shane Wynn 75 yard run (Griifin Oakes kick)	MSU 14–10
2	5:25	IND	Zander Diamont 9 yard run (Griffin Oakes kick)	IND 14–17
2	3:59	MSU	Jeremy Langford 8 yard run (Michael Geiger kick)	MSU 21–17
2	1:14	MSU	Macgarrett Kings 14 yard pass from Connor Cook (Michael Geiger kick)	MSU 28–17
3	7:52	MSU	R.J. Shelton 4 yard pass from Connor Cook (Michael Geiger kick)	MSU 35–17
4	14:14	MSU	Jeremy Langford 12 yard run (Michael Geiger kick)	MSU 42–17
4	5:06	MSU	Delton Williams 22 yard run (Michael Geiger kick)	MSU 49–17
4	1:24	MSU	Nick Hill 76 yard run (Michael Geiger kick)	MSU 56–17

The Spartans returned to the state of Indiana for the second week in a row after previously beating Purdue. MSU was looking to win their sixth in a row over the Hoosiers and their third in a row at Memorial Stadium. Indiana entered the game starting their third-string quarterback Zander Diamont, a true freshman that was thrust into action after the two quarterbacks ahead of him on the depth chart were injured the previous week at Iowa. The Hoosiers won the toss and elected to receive the ball, which resulted in a quick three and out. Michigan State's offense struck quickly with a seven play drive that was capped with a 32-yard touchdown run by Jeremy Langford. Another three and out by Indiana gave the ball back to the Spartans, but an eight play drive was wasted by a missed 42-yard field goal by Michael Geiger. Indiana's offense finally got rolling with a 65-yard run by running back Tevin Coleman. After the run, the MSU defense locked down and held the Hoosiers to a 27-yard field goal by Griffin Oakes.

The second quarter began with MSU in possession of the football at their 30-yard line. The drive ended with a ten-yard TD pass from Connor Cook to Josiah Price. Indiana quickly responded with a 75-yard Shane Wynn touchdown run on the first play of the ensuing possession, closing the score to 14–10 in favor of the Spartans. After several stalled drives by each teams and an intercepted Connor Cook pass by Tegray Scales, the Hoosiers took the lead after a Zander Diamont nine yard TD run. On the ensuing drive, Connor Cook hit Josiah Price for a 67-yard gain to the Indiana eight yard line. On the next play Jeremy Langford ran it in for his second touchdown of the game, giving MSU the lead back at 21–17. After another Indiana three and out, the Spartans marched down the field and scored another TD after Cook hit Macgarrett Kings Jr. on a 14-yard pass. Two run plays by the Hoosiers ended the first half with MSU leading 28–17.

The third quarter started with MSU receiving the ball, which resulted in a three and out. After another stalled Hoosier drive, the Spartans took the ball over. Facing third and nine, Connor Cook scrambled to avoid Hoosier defenders and lobbed a 41-yard over the shoulder pass to Tony Lippett. Six plays later, a four-yard pass from Cook to R.J. Shelton extended the lead to 35–17. Neither team scored during the rest of the quarter, but MSU was in the midst of a drive into IU territory when the quarter ended.

The fourth quarter began with MSU scoring their sixth TD of the day on a 12-yard TD run by Langford. Another failed drive by IU gave the ball back to MSU, who again punched it into the end zone on a 22-yard run by Delton Williams. Indiana's next drive brought the game to a halt when starting left tackle Jason Spriggs injured his upper neck. Spriggs was removed from the field by medical personnel and taken for medical tests by ambulance. After play resumed, Indiana again punted the ball MSU. MSU added the last score of the day on the third play of the drive, a 76-yard TD run by Nick Hill. Indiana would fumble the ball on the first play of the next drive, which was recovered by MSU's Demetrius Cooper. The Spartan's ended the game with two kneel downs, completing their sweep of the Hoosier state in 2014.

The win made it six in a row against the Hoosiers and increased Mark Dantonio's record against Indiana based Big Ten teams to 12–0.

==== Michigan ====
Michigan at Michigan State
(Paul Bunyan Trophy)

Team	1	2	3	4	Total
Michigan	0	3	0	8	11
• No. 8 Michigan State	7	7	14	7	35

- Date: October 25th
- Location:
  Spartan Stadium
  East Lansing, MI
- Game start: 3:36 p.m.
- Elapsed time: 3:27
- Game attendance: 76,331
- Game weather: 68 °F (20 °C), Wind 20 mph (32 km/h) W, Sunny
- Referee: Dan Capron
- TV announcers (ABC):
  Sean McDonough (Play-by-Play)
  Chris Spielman (Analyst)
  Todd McShay (Sideline)

Scoring summary
1	11:52	MSU	Jeremy Langford 2 yard run (Michael Geiger kick)	MSU 7–0
2	3:30	UM	Matt Wile 48 yard field goal	MSU 7–3
2	0:21	MSU	Jeremy Langford 1 yard run (Michael Geiger kick)	MSU 14–3
3	8:33	MSU	RJ Williamson 29 yard interception return (Michael Geiger kick	MSU 21–3
3	6:17	MSU	Tony Lippett 70 yard pass from Connor Cook (Michael Geiger kick)	MSU 28–3
4	3:40	UM	De'Veon Smith 1 yard run (Devin Gardner pass to Jake Butt for 2-point conversion)	MSU 28–11
4	0:28	MSU	Jeremy Langford 5 yard run (Michael Geiger kick)	MSU 35–11

The 107th edition of the Michigan State – Michigan rivalry was televised in front of a national ABC audience for the second straight year. The Spartans came in on a five-game winning streak while the Wolverines limped in having lost three of their last four games. The Wolverines were looking for a measure of revenge after being completely overwhelmed the previous year in a 29–6 thrashing. In an apparent attempt to motivate each other, several Michigan players (led by linebacker Joe Bolden) gathered on the field during the national anthem and thrust a tent stake into the Spartan Stadium turf. Michigan would win the coin toss and defer until the second half.

Michigan State received the kickoff and started at their 25-yard line. On the second play of the game, Connor Cook hit Tony Lippett for a 24-yard gain to the 49 yard line. Three plays later Cook connected with Keith Mumphery for an additional 28 yards to the Michigan 21. On second down, Cook kept the ball and ran down to the 17 yard line where he trucked Michigan safety Delano Hill. Hill responded by hitting Cook after play and received an unsportsmanlike conduct penalty. With the ball on the two, Jeremy Langford powered it in for the first touchdown of the game. After short, failed drives by both teams, Mike Sadler punted away and gave Michigan the ball near midfield. A targeting penalty by MSU reserve linebacker Chris Frey (which resulted in his ejection) gave Michigan the ball at the MSU 29. The penalty ended up not hurting the Spartans as Michigan senior quarterback Devin Gardner promptly fumbled the ball, giving it back to State. MSU would drive down to the Michigan five yard line but a loss on a Langford run and a sack on Cook resulted in a 36-yard field goal attempt by Michael Geiger, which he missed. The quarter ended with Michigan in possession of the ball with a third and 15 from at their own 11.

The second quarter began with the Wolverines converting a third and long when Gardner hit Amara Darboh for a 24-yard gain. The Wolverines were able to eventually reach midfield before they were forced to punt. MSU's next drive was able to reach the Michigan 34 yard line where a failed fourth down conversion attempt ended the drive. After a UM three and a fumble by MSU tight end Josiah Price, the Wolverines found well into MSU territory. The Spartan defense rose up and stuffed the Wolverines for no gain and forced a 48-yard field goal by Matt Wile. With a 7–3 lead and 3:30 left in the half, the Spartans took over at their own 27 yard line. On the first play of the drive Jeremy Langford ripped off a 24-yard run. A few plays later Cook connected with AJ Troup for a 13-yard pass to the UM 25. Cook next hit Langford for 18 yards to the seven on a screen play. The ensuing play saw Langford run for an apparent touchdown, which was ruled down at the one after the officials reviewed the play. Three plays later Langford would finish the drive with his second TD of the day, which essentially ended the first half with MSU up 14–3.

Michigan received the ball to begin the second half. After stalled drives by both Michigan an MSU, the Wolverines found themselves with the ball at their own 22. On second and nine, Gardner threw an interception to MSU safety RJ Williamson who returned it for a touchdown and pushed the lead to 21–3. Another short Michigan drive forced by the MSU defense resulted in MSU's offense in possession at their30 yard line. Before the drive began ABC showed a flashback to the infamous Mike Hart/Mark Dantonio exchange from 2007, which set the stage for the ensuing play. On the first play of the drive, Connor Cook hit Tony Lippett on a perfectly thrown back shoulder catch that resulted in a 70-yard MSU touchdown. Michigan's next drive saw Michigan move to ball to its deepest point all game. After failing to convert on third down at the MSU 10, Michigan attempted to convert on fourth down. Devin Gardner attempted to reach the line of game but was stopped short by RJ Williamson and Lawrence Thomas. MSU maintained position for the remainder of the quarter and took their 28–3 lead into the fourth.

After failing to convert a third down on their first play of the fourth quarter, Mike Sadler punted the ball to the Wolverines. After failed drives by both sides, the Spartans began a possession with 9:01 remaining. After several successful runs, the Spartans had the ball at their own 36 and were looking to run as much clock as possible. On first down, a failed handoff between Cook and Langford resulted in a fumble that was recovered by Michigan's Frank Clark. With 5:24 remaining, Michigan had the ball at the MSU 33 and looked to score their first touchdown of the game. After converting a third and ten with a 24-yard gain to Devin Funchess, the Wolverines had a first and goal at the nine. On third and goal, the Wolverines finally scored on a one-yard run by De’Veon Smith. The touchdown was the Wolverine's first against the Spartans since the fourth quarter of the 2011 matchup. The Wolverines were able to convert a two-point conversion making the score 28–11 with 3:40 remaining. The Spartans were able to stop an onside kick attempt and took over at the Michigan 48 yard line. The Spartan's last drive of the game was a punishing 48 yard march down the field with seven straight Langford runs. His last run capped the drive off and finished scoring for the game, giving the Spartans a 35–11 victory.

The victory gave MSU their sixth win in seven meetings against the Wolverines and their fourth straight at Spartan Stadium. Head coach Mark Dantonio addressed the stake incident in his postgame press conference by stating “we drove a stake in them.”

==== Ohio State ====
Ohio State at Michigan State

Team	1	2	3	4	Total
• No. 13 Ohio State	7	21	7	14	49
No. 7 Michigan State	14	7	3	13	37

- Date: November 8th
- Location:
  Spartan Stadium
  East Lansing, MI
- Game start: 8:14 p.m.
- Elapsed time: 3:45
- Game attendance: 76,409
- Game weather: 39 °F (4 °C), Wind 8 mph (13 km/h) NW, Cloudy
- Referee: Jerry McGinn
- TV announcers (ABC):
  Chris Fowler (Play-by-Play)
  Kirk Herbstreit (Analyst)
  Heather Cox (Sideline)

Scoring summary
1	9:42	MSU	Keith Mumphery 15 Yd pass from Connor Cook (Michael Geiger Kick)	MSU 7–0
1	8:41	OSU	J. T. Barrett 5 Yd Run (Sean Nuernberger Kick)	Tie 7–7
1	6:14	MSU	Jeremy Langford 33 Yd Run (Michael Geiger Kick)	MSU 14–7
2	12:27	OSU	J.T. Barrett 1 Yd Run (Sean Nuernberger Kick)	Tie 14–14
2	4:37	MSU	Jeremy Langford 1 Yd Run (Michael Geiger Kick)	MSU 21–14
2	3:19	OSU	Michael Thomas 79 Yd pass from J.T. Barrett (Sean Nuernberger Kick)	Tie 21–21
2	0:56	OSU	Devin Smith 44 Yd pass from J.T. Barrett (Sean Nuernberger Kick)	OSU 28–21
3	8:38	MSU	Michael Geiger 40 Yd Field Goal	OSU 28–24
3	2:18	OSU	Ezekiel Elliott 1 Yd Run (Sean Nuernberger Kick)	OSU 35–24
4	12:07	OSU	Dontre Wilson 7 Yd pass from J.T. Barrett (Sean Nuernberger Kick)	OSU 42–24
4	9:15	MSU	Josiah Price 16 Yd pass from Connor Cook (Michael Geiger Kick)	OSU 42–31
4	7:12	OSU	Ezekiel Elliott 17 Yd Run (Sean Nuernberger Kick)	OSU 49–31
4	5:20	MSU	Jeremy Langford 1 Yd Run (Two-Point Pass Conversion Failed)	OSU 49–37

==== Maryland ====
Michigan State at Maryland

Team	1	2	3	4	Total
• No. 12 Michigan State	6	10	7	14	37
Maryland	0	7	0	8	15

- Date: November 15th
- Location:
  Byrd Stadium
  College Park, MD
- Game start: 8:10 p.m.
- Elapsed time: 3:40
- Game attendance: 51,802
- Game weather: 32 °F (0 °C), Wind: None, Fair
- Referee: Shawn Smith
- TV announcers (BTN):
  Kevin Kugler (Play-by-Play)
  Glen Mason (Analyst)
  Lisa Byington (Sideline)

Scoring summary
1	7:01	MSU	Michael Geiger 22 Yd Field Goal	MSU 3–0
1	2:34	MSU	Michael Geiger 34 Yd Field Goal	MSU 6–0
2	10:42	MSU	Michael Geiger 35 Yd Field Goal	MSU 9–0
2	8:46	MD	Daniel Adams 20 Yd pass from C.J. Brown (Brad Craddock Kick)	MSU 9–7
2	2:00	MSU	Jeremy Langford 8 Yd Run (Michael Geiger Kick)	MSU 16–7
3	1:06	MSU	RJ Williamson 22 Yd Interception Return (Michael Geiger Kick)	MSU 23–7
4	7:06	MSU	Jeremy Langford 25 Yd Run (Michael Geiger Kick)	MSU 30–7
4	4:07	MD	Juwann Winfree 31 Yd pass from C.J. Brown (C.J. Brown Pass to Derrick Hayward for Two-Point Conversion)	MSU 30–15
4	3:15	MSU	Nick Hill 33 Yd Run (Michael Geiger Kick)	MSU 37–15

Coming off of a tough loss to Ohio State, the Spartans traveled to play the Maryland Terrapins for the first time as Big Ten Conference opponents. The game was MSU's first true road night game since the 2009 season when they traveled to Minneapolis to face the Minnesota Golden Gophers. In front of a full house (which contained a large Spartan contingent), the Spartans looked to extend their Big Ten road winning streak to nine games.

MSU received the ball to open the game, but only reached mid-field before punting. MSU's defense, looking to atone for a poor performance against the Buckeyes, quickly got the ball back when Kurtis Drummond intercepted a C.J. Brown pass and took the ball to the UMD 28. State was able to reach the five yard line, where they were forced to settle for a 22-yard Michael Geiger field goal. State's defense forced a three and out on the next position, giving the offense the ball back on their own 11. The next drive was aided by a 50-yard Connor Cook pass to Macgarrett Kings Jr., which moved the ball to the UMD 37 yard line. State eventually drove to the 17 before settling for a 34-yard Geiger FG. Another Maryland three and out ensued, giving the Spartans the ball for the rest of the first quarter.

MSU began the second quarter by again driving deep into Terrapin territory where they again settled for a Geiger FG (35 yards), which gave them a 9–0 lead. Maryland's offense was given a hug boost to open the next drive after William Likely returned the kickoff 52 yards to the MSU 41. After converting a fourth and six, C.J. Brown was able to connect with Daniel Adams for a 20-yard touchdown pass. MSU's offense appeared to have been stopped by the Terps, but a muffed punt by Likely resulted in new life for State's offense. That second chance was squandered when Geiger missed a 47-yard FG attempt, keeping the score 9–7. Another three and out by the Terps gave the ball back to MSU. MSU took advantage, picking up 62 yards on a Cook pass to Keith Mumphrey. After a false start on the ensuing play, Jeremy Langford ran for an eight-yard TD and a 16–7 lead. Maryland ended the half with the ball at midfield.

The Terps received the ball to open the third, but quickly gave the ball back to State after another three and out. Neither offense was able to get much going throughout the third quarter. The only scoring occurred when a C.J Brown pass was intercepted and returned for a touchdown by MSU safety R.J. Williamson, giving State a 23–7 lead. Yet another three and out gave MSU the ball back, maintaining possession until the end of the quarter.

The first two offensive of the fourth quarter saw little ball movement. MSU was able to add to their lead on their second possession of the quarter when Jeremy Langford broke free for a 25-yard touchdown run. The Terps responded by completing a 77-yard scoring drive with a Brown TD pass to Juwann Winfree and a successful two point conversion on a Brown to Derrick Hayward pass. With the score at 30–15, Maryland attempted an onside kick. MSU was able to recover the onside kick attempt and effectively ended the game when Nick Hill broke free for a 33-yard touchdown run.

==== Rutgers ====
Rutgers at Michigan State

Team	1	2	3	4	Total
Rutgers	0	0	3	0	3
• No. 10 Michigan State	14	21	0	10	45

- Date: November 22nd
- Location:
  Spartan Stadium
  East Lansing, MI
- Game start: 12:01 p.m.
- Elapsed time: 3:06
- Game attendance: 70,902
- Game weather: 38 °F (3 °C), Wind 9 mph (14 km/h) SW, Overcast
- Referee: John O'Neill
- TV announcers (BTN):
  Cory Provus (Play-by-Play)
  Stanley Jackson (Analyst)
  Rick Pizzo (Sideline)

Scoring summary
1	5:36	MSU	Tony Lippett 30 Yd pass from Connor Cook (Michael Geiger Kick)	MSU 7–0
1	3:19	MSU	Jeremy Langford 18 Yd Run (Michael Geiger Kick)	MSU 14–0
2	12:12	MSU	Jeremy Langford 38 Yd Run (Michael Geiger Kick)	MSU 21–0
2	5:19	MSU	Nick Hill 1 Yd Run (Michael Geiger Kick)	MSU 28–0
2	0:28	MSU	R.J. Shelton 7 Yd pass from Connor Cook (Michael Geiger Kick)	MSU 35–0
3	0:49	RUT	Kyle Federico 44 Yd Field Goal	MSU 35–3
4	11:36	MSU	Michael Geiger 23 Yd Field Goal	MSU 38–3
4	5:53	MSU	Nick Hill 16 Yd Run (Michael Geiger Kick)	MSU 45–3

Michigan State hosted the Rutgers Scarlet Knights for the time as conference opponents and for the first time at Spartan Stadium since 2003. MSU celebrated senior day on a cold, icy day in mid-Michigan. The game started off with Rutgers receiving the opening kick, which resulted in a three and out for the knights. MSU's ensuing possession came to an end after three plays when Connor Cook fumbled the ball at the Rutgers 21 yard line. Rutgers was unable to capitalize, turning the ball back over to the Spartans when Kurtis Drummond intercepted Gary Nova's third down pass. MSU's offense got themselves going with a nine play, 66 yard drive that was capped by a 30-yard TD pass from Cook to Tony Lippett. Another three and out by the Knights forced a punting situation which resulted in a shank by punter Joseph Roth (10 yard punt), giving State the ball on the Rutgers 33 yard line. Three plays later, running back Jeremy Langford ran for an 18-yard touchdown. Rutgers finished the first quarter with the ball and successfully driving to the MSU 30.

The Scarlet Knights were unable to successfully finish off their best drive of the game after kicker Kyle Federico missed a 46-yard field goal attempt. State's offense once again marched down the field and scored another TD when Jeremy Langford broke free for a 38-yard score. MSU got the ball back after another three and out by Rutgers and again scored a TD when Nick Hill ran in on a one-yard run, giving the Spartans a 28–0 lead. The Knights next drive was cut short when linebacker Riley Bullough intercepted Gary Nova at the RU 48 yard line. The offense once again reached the end zone when Cook connected with R.J. Shelton on a seven-yard pass. Rutgers held the ball for the final 28 seconds of the half, which ended with MSU leading 35–0.

The third quarter began with MSU receiving the kickoff. MSU was able to drive to the RU 24 yard line where it appeared they would settle for a Michael Geiger field goal attempt. Instead, holder Mike Sadler flipped the ball to Geiger who ran it down to the one yard line. The bold fake attempt was for naught due to a Nick Hill fumble on the next play. After stalled drives by each offense, the Knights were finally able to get on the board when Federico hit a 44-yard attempt.

The final quarter began with MSU in possession of the ball. State was able to drive to the RU six yard line, where Geiger connected on a 23-yard FG attempt. Another three and out by the RU offense gave MSU the ball back at their own 34. State punched it in for the last score of the game when Nick Hill broke free for a 16-yard TD run, capping a 45–3 victory for the Spartans.

==== Penn State ====
Michigan State at Penn State
(Land Grant Trophy)

Team	1	2	3	4	Total
• No. 10 Michigan State	13	0	14	7	34
Penn State	0	3	7	0	10

- Date: November 29th
- Location:
  Beaver Stadium
  University Park, PA
- Game start: 3:35 p.m.
- Elapsed time: 3:20
- Game attendance: 99,902
- Game weather: 33 °F (1 °C), Wind 7 mph (11 km/h) SW, Cloudy
- Referee: Dan Capron
- TV announcers (ABC / ESPN2):
  Mike Patrick (Play-by-Play)
  Ed Cunningham (Analyst)
  Jeannine Edwards (Sideline)

Scoring summary
1	14:46	MSU	R.J. Shelton 90 Yd Kickoff Return (Michael Geiger Kick)	MSU 7–0
1	8:41	MSU	Michael Geiger 36 Yd Field Goal	MSU 10–0
1	0:13	MSU	Michael Geiger 39 Yd Field Goal	MSU 13–0
2	4:34	PSU	Sam Ficken 41 Yd Field Goal	MSU 13–3
3	7:24	MSU	Jeremy Langford 3 Yd Run (Michael Geiger Kick)	MSU 20–3
3	4:29	MSU	Tony Lippett 10 Yd pass from Connor Cook (Michael Geiger Kick)	MSU 27–3
3	1:37	PSU	Akeel Lynch 3 Yd Run (Sam Ficken Kick)	MSU 27–10
4	2:49	MSU	Jeremy Langford 6 Yd Run (Michael Geiger Kick)	MSU 34–10

Michigan State squared off against Penn State for the first time since the conclusion of the 2010 season, a 28–22 victory that gave MSU a share of the 2010 Big Ten Championship. Michigan State was looking to secure their 10th win of the season and second in a row over the Nittany Lions. Penn State came into the game with a 6–5 overall record and a 2–5 Big Ten record.

The Spartans received the ball to begin the game with RJ Shelton taking back the opening kick 90 yards for a touchdown. Penn State responded by driving down to the MSU 34 yard line, where the drive stalled. Senior kicker Sam Ficken attempted a 51-yard field goal, which fell well short. On MSU's first offensive possession, the Spartans were able to drive to Penn State's 19 yard line where Michael Geiger hit a 36-yard field goal. After holding PSU, the Spartan offense once again drove deep into Penn State territory and again settled for a Geiger field goal (39 yards).

The second quarter saw little offense as the ball remained in MSU territory for most of the quarter. The only scoring came from a Penn State drive halfway through when Ficken was able to convert a 41-yard field goal attempt. MSU's ensuing drive showed some promise with the Spartans across mid field at the PSU 47 yard line. After a few penalties, MSU was facing a third and 20 from their own 43. On third down Connor Cook threw an interception to defensive tackle Anthony Zettel, who returned it to the MSU 36 yard line with 43 seconds remaining in the half. Christian Hackenburg was able to drive the Lions down to the MSU 23, but a second down pass into the end zone was intercepted by Trae Waynes. On the next play, a kneel down by Cook ended the quarter with MSU leading 13–3.

The third quarter began with Penn State driving to mid field before being forced to punt. On the ensuing drive, Cook connected with Keith Mumphery and Macgaret Kings Jr. on back to back plays of 25 and 31 yards giving MSU first and goal at the five. Three plays later Jeremy Langford punched it in for the first offensive touchdown of the day, giving MSU a 20–3 lead. Penn State's next drive was quickly ended when Marcus Rush sacked and forced a fumble on Hackenberg, giving MSU the ball at the Penn State 18 yard line. Five plays later Connor Cook hit Tony Lippett for a ten-yard touchdown, resulting in a 27–3 lead with less than five minutes left in the third. Penn State's offense finally got on track, aided by Akeel Lynch's 26 yard run, and drove the length of the field for a Lynch three yard touchdown. The quarter ended with MSU in possession of the ball and a 27–10 lead.

The beginning of the fourth quarter saw MSU with a drive down to the PSU 27 yard line. After failing to convert a third and long, Michael Geiger attempted and missed a 44-yard field goal wide left. After failed possessions by both teams, Penn State found themselves with a fourth and 20 at their own 20 yard line. After a failed fourth down conversion, MSU regained possession already in the red zone. On the fourth straight run by Jeremy Langford, the Spartans added another TD (Langford's second) and increased their lead to 34–10 and finished scoring for the day.

The win guaranteed the fourth ten win season in the last five for the Spartans and their second straight win over the Nittany Lions (both at Beaver Stadium). Michigan State finished with a 10–2 overall record, 7–1 in the Big ten, and would ultimately get invited to the Cotton Bowl Classic in Arlington, TX on January 1. Penn State fell to 6–6 overall, 2–6 Big Ten, and would be invited to the Pinstripe Bowl.

==== Baylor (Cotton Bowl Classic) ====
Michigan State vs Baylor
(Cotton Bowl Classic)

Team	1	2	3	4	Total
• No. 7 Michigan State	14	0	7	21	42
No. 4 Baylor	14	10	17	0	41

- Date: January 1st
- Location:
  AT&T Stadium
  Arlington, TX
- Game start: 12:46 p.m.
- Elapsed time: 4:10
- Game attendance: 71,464
- Game weather: Indoors (retractable roof closed)
- Referee: Jeff Flanagan
- TV announcers (ESPN/ESPN Radio):
  Dave Pasch (Play-by-Play)
  Brian Griese (Color)
  Tom Luginbill (Sideline)
  Brad Sham (Play-by-Play)
  Kelly Stouffer (Color)
  Ian Fitzsimmons (Sideline)

Scoring summary
1	12:27	MSU	Jeremy Langford 2 yard run (Michael Geiger kick)	MSU 7–0
1	8:56	BAY	KD Cannon 49-yard touchdown reception from Bryce Petty, (Chris Callahan kick)	Tie 7–7
1	5:06	MSU	R.J. Shelton 11-yard run (Michael Geiger kick)	MSU 14–7
1	2:32	BAY	Corey Coleman 53-yard touchdown reception from Jay Lee (Chris Callahan kick)	Tie 14–14
2	8:13	BAY	Bryce Petty 1-yard touchdown run (Chris Callahan kick)	BAY 21–14
2	3:14	BAY	25-yard FG by Chris Callahan	BAY 24–14
3	14:32	BAY	KD Cannon 74-yard touchdown reception from Bryce Petty (Chris Callahan kick)	BAY 31–14
3	11:23	BAY	46-yard FG by Chris Callahan	BAY 34–14
3	6:50	MSU	Jeremy Langford 2-yard touchdown run (Michael Geiger kick)	BAY 34–21
3	4:03	BAY	LaQuon McGowan 18-yard touchdown reception from Bryce Petty (Chris Callahan kick)	BAY 41–21
4	12:09	MSU	Josiah Price 8-yard touchdown reception from Connor Cook(Michael Geiger kick)	BAY 41–28
4	4:55	MSU	Jeremy Langford 1-yard touchdown run(Michael Geiger kick)	BAY 41–35
4	0:17	MSU	Keith Mumphery 10-yard touchdown reception from Connor Cook (Michael Geiger kick)	MSU 42–41

Michigan State was selected to play in the 79th Cotton Bowl Classic against the Big 12 Co-Champion Baylor Bears (11–1, 8–1 Big 12) in the first iteration of the College Football Playoff New Year's Six bowl games. Michigan State was making its first Cotton Bowl appearance while Baylor was making their third. The Spartans were only the second Big Ten team to participate in the Cotton Bowl with Ohio State being the first in the 1987 Cotton Bowl Classic (Nebraska and Penn State both played in the Cotton Bowl prior to joining the Big Ten). Michigan State won the coin toss and elected to receive the opening kickoff.

On Michigan State's first possession, Jeremy Langford broke open a career long 65 yard run down to the Baylor one yard line. Three plays later, Langford would finish the drive with a two-yard touchdown run. Baylor would quickly respond on the next drive. After driving the ball to midfield, quarterback Bryce Petty hit KD Cannon for a 49-yard touchdown to tie the game at seven. On the ensuing kickoff return MSU's RJ Shelton was able to reach the MSU 40 yard line, giving MSU great field position. Taking advantage, Connor Cook quickly hit Tony Lippett for a 24-yard gain. A few plays later RJ Shelton scored a touchdown on an 11-yard sweep, giving the Spartans a 14–7 lead. After stalled drives by both teams, Baylor tied the game on a 53-yard pass by wide receiver Jay Lee to Corey Coleman with 2:32 remaining in the quarter.

To begin the second quarter, MSU drove the ball down to the Baylor 28 yard line. On third down Connor Cook attempted to option the ball to RJ Shelton, but the pass fell behind Williams and resulted in a loss of five yards. After a timeout, MSU lined up for a 50-yard field goal. Instead of kicking the ball, holder Mike Sadler flung the ball to kicker Michael Geiger attempted to run for the first down. Baylor quickly responded and stopped him short. With the ball, Baylor drove down the Spartan goal line and scored on a Bryce Petty QB sneak. Baylor led 21–14 with 8:13 remaining in the 1st half. After MSU's drive stalled at midfield Baylor drove the field and tacked on three points with a 25-yard field goal by Chris Callahan, which ended the scoring in the first half.

Baylor received the ball to begin the second half and quickly took advantage. On the second play, KD Cannon split the MSU secondary or a 74-yard touchdown reception (Cannon's second TD of the day) from Petty and increased Baylor's lead to 31–14. After a MSU three and out Baylor drove down and got in position for a 46-yard field goal by Callahan, giving the Bears a 34–14 lead with 11:23 remaining in the third. On the next drive, MSU drove to Baylor 45 yard line where they faced a 3rd and 4. On a key play of the second half, Cook hit Shelton on a shallow crossing pattern for a 19-yard gain. The following play saw Lippett gain 19 yards on a double reverse giving the Spartan's first and goal from the eight yard line. Three plays later the Spartan's punched it in on a two-yard Langford run, closing the score to 34–21. Baylor's next drive began with Shilique Calhoun sacking and forcing a Petty fumble, which was recovered by the Bears. On second down, Petty hit KD Cannon for another big gain to the MSU 44 yard line. Five plays later Petty hit wide open backup offensive guard LaQuan McGowan for an 18-yard TD, which set off a wild celebration amongst the Baylor sideline and their fans throughout AT&T Stadium. The score gave Baylor a 41–21 lead with 4:03 left in the quarter. On their next drive the Spartans were able to drive down to the Baylor 26, but the drive ended when Cook threw a pass into double coverage and was ultimately intercepted by Alfred Pullom. Baylor responded by moving the ball deep into MSU territory, but a penalty and an Ed Davis sack to close the quarter resulted in a third a 28 from the MSU 43 yard line. Baylor led the game 41–21 at the end of the third quarter.

After failing to convert on third down, Chris Callahan set up for a 46-yard field goal attempt that would bounce off the right upright. MSU took over at their own 29 yard line. On the first play of the drive, Cook connected with Keith Mumphery for a 50-yard gain. Four plays later, Cook passed to Josiah Price in the corner of the end zone for an eight-yard touchdown. The score made it 41–28 with 12:09 remaining. On the ensuing kick-off, MSU kicker Kevin Cronin executed a successful onside kick (recovered by Jermaine Edmonson). With the ball and momentum, Cook connected down the Baylor sideline with Aaron Burbridge for a 39-yard gain to the Bears' 14 yard line. The ensuing play gave Baylor all of the momentum back as Connor Cook threw an interception to linebacker Taylor Young, who returned the ball all the way to the end zone for an apparent touchdown. Instead, a block in the back during the return brought the ball back to the Baylor 43 yard line. Six plays later Baylor would give the ball back to Michigan State after failing to convert on fourth down from the MSU 39. With 9:15 remaining in the game, MSU began their drive in an attempt to make the game closer. MSU managed to move the ball down to the Bear 11 yard line where Cook scrambled for an apparent touchdown. After instant replay overturned the score, Jeremy Langford ran it in to bring the score to 41–35 with 4:55 remaining in the game. Instead of attempting an onside kick, Michigan State elected to kick the ball deep and put the game in the hands of their defense. Baylor was able to move the ball downfield to the MSU 33 yard line and appeared in control of the game when a slant pass to Corey Coleman reached inside the five yard line. However, Coleman was flagged for an offensive facemask which brought the ball back to the 22 yard line. A false start, a short pass to the sideline for one yard, a rush for loss, and a short four yard gain to the flat resulted in a fourth down from the 27 yard line. With the clock under 1:15, Baylor attempted a 44-yard field goal. During the kick MSU senior defensive end Marcus Rush was able to get a hand on the ball, which resulted in the ball popping up and into RJ Williamson's hands. Williamson began to return the ball for MSU and was aided by a block on Chris Callahan by Tony Lippett. Williamson returned the ball to the Baylor 45 yard line where he was run out of bounds with 1:06 remaining. With new life the MSU offense lined up and quickly completed a 17-yard pass to Mumphery. After failing to complete a pass during the following three plays, MSU faced fourth and ten. With the game on the line, Connor Cook was able to complete a 16-yard pass to Lippett. With first and goal, 33 seconds remaining and no timeouts, MSU had four chances to get a touchdown. After two poor throws from Cook, the Spartans faced third and goal with 22 seconds left. On third down, Cook hit Keith Mumphery for the go ahead touchdown with 17 seconds left. Baylor got the ball back with only a field goal needed for the win. On first down from their own 25 yard line, Petty was sacked by defensive tackle Lawrence Thomas for a six-yard loss. After a quick timeout and with only 13 seconds left on a second and long Petty was sacked again, this time by Marcus Rush and Riley Bullough, forcing Baylor to call a second timeout. Facing third and 23 from their own 12 yard line with only seven seconds left, Petty attempted to hit a quick slant over the middle. His pass was intercepted by a diving Riley Bullough, who essentially ended the game with only two seconds remaining. The MSU offense returned to the field for one kneel down. Bowl chairman Dan Novakov awarded MSU head coach Mark Dantonio the Field Scovell Trophy in a post game ceremony.

The win resulted in Michigan State's school record fourth straight bowl win and second straight New Year's Day bowl win. Michigan State finished the season ranked No. 5 in both polls (tied with Florida State in the AP poll) while Baylor finished No. 7 in the AP and No. 8 in the Coaches. It was the first time since the 1965 and 1966 seasons that the Spartans had finished consecutive seasons ranked in the top five. The Spartans sent off beloved defensive coordinator Pat Narduzzi, who had taken the Pittsburgh Panthers football head coaching job on December 23, with a memorable victory.

== Rankings ==
Ranking movements Legend: ██ Increase in ranking ██ Decrease in ranking т = Tied with team above or below
	Week																
Poll	Pre	1	2	3	4	5	6	7	8	9	10	11	12	13	14	15	Final
AP	8	7	13	11	9	10	8	8	8	8	7	12	10	10	7	7	5 т
Coaches	8	6	13	11	9	10	8	6	5	5	6	12	9	8	7	7	5
CFP	Not released									8	8	12	11	10	8	8	Not released

== Roster ==
2014 Michigan State Spartans football team roster
Players
Coaches
Offense

Pos.	#	Name	Class
WR	13	Robert Aiello	Fr
OL	65	Brian Allen	Fr
C	66	Jack Allen	Jr
QB	22	Paul Andrie	So
WR	5	DeAnthony Arnett	Jr
WR	87	Tres Barksdale	So
OL	61	James Bodanis	Sr
G	57	Adam Brown	Jr
WR	16	Aaron Burbridge	Jr
TE	80	Dylan Chmura	Fr
OL	76	Donavon Clark	Jr
OL	64	Brandon Clemons	Jr
OT	74	Jack Conklin	So
TE	97	Nathan Conrad	Fr
QB	18	Connor Cook	Jr
OL	73	Dennis Finley	Fr
OL	71	Chase Gianacakos	Fr
TE	84	Andrew Gleichert	Sr
G	67	Zach Higgins	So
RB	20	Nick Hill	Sr
RB	24	Gerald Holmes	So
C	63	Travis Jackson (C)	Sr
WR	89	John Jakubik	Sr
C	79	Kodi Kieler	So
WR	17	Trey Kilgore	Fr
WR	85	Macgarrett Kings	Jr
G	54	Connor Kruse	Sr
QB	11	Colar Kuhns	Fr
TE	83	Paul Lang	Jr
RB	33	Jeremy Langford	Sr
WR	14	Tony Lippett	Sr
RB	28	Madre London	Fr
FB	40	Collin Lucas	Fr
TE	11	Jamal Lyles	So
OL	55	Miguel Machado	Jr
WR	86	Matt Macksood	So
WR	88	Monty Madaris	So
WR	34	Brock Makaric	Fr
G	75	Benny McGowan	So
WR	25	Keith Mumphery	Sr
QB	7	Tyler O’Connor	So
RB	41	Gerald Owens	Fr
OL	77	Nick Padla	Fr
FB	37	Trevon Pendleton	Jr
TE	82	Josiah Price	So
FB	47	Matt Rea	Sr
C	58	Devyn Salmon	Fr
OL	68	Jeremy Schram	Fr
OL	60	Casey Schreiner	Fr
WR	12	R.J. Shelton	So
WR	21	Andre Sims	Jr
TE	81	Matt Sokol	Fr
WR	15	Brandon Sowards	Fr
QB	6	Damion Terry	Fr
WR	19	A. J. Troup	Jr
QB	16	Tommy Vento	Jr
RB	22	Delton Williams	So
RB	36	Phillip-Michael Williams	Jr
WR	26	Austin Wolfe	Fr

Defense

Pos.	#	Name	Class
DL	51	Dillon Alexander	Fr
DT	59	David Beedle	Fr
LB	38	Byron Bullough	Fr
LB	30	Riley Bullough	So
DE	89	Shilique Calhoun (C)	Jr
DL	64	Brandon Clemons	Jr
DB	36	Arjen Colquhoun	Jr
DE	98	Demetrius Cooper	Fr
CB	13	Vayante Copeland	Fr
S	7	Demetrious Cox	So
LB	43	Ed Davis	Jr
LB	53	Peter DePorre	Fr
S	27	Kurtis Drummond (C)	Sr
CB	39	Jermaine Edmondson	So
DT	72	Craig Evans	Fr
DL	96	David Fennell	So
LB	23	Chris Frey	Fr
LB	31	T. J. Harrell	Fr
LB	50	Sean Harrington	Fr
LB	45	Darien Harris	Jr
DE	92	Joel Heath	Jr
CB	2	Darian Hicks	So
S	6	Mylan Hicks	Sr
DE	85	Evan Jones	Fr
LB	49	Shane Jones	Fr
LB	34	Taiwan Jones	Sr
DL	99	James Kittredge	Sr
DL	93	Damon Knox	Jr
S	14	Chris Laneaux	Jr
DB	32	Zac Leimbach	So
DL	4	Malik McDowell	Fr
DB	29	Mark Meyers	So
DB	10	Matt Morrissey	Fr
DB	9	Montae Nicholson	Fr
DB	35	Jalyn Powell	Fr
LB	33	Jon Reschke	Fr
LB	48	Pat Rhomberg	Jr
DE	44	Marcus Rush	Sr
DL	56	Enoch Smith	Fr
DE	94	Montez Sweet	Fr
DL	8	Lawrence Thomas	Jr
CB	32	Nick Thompkins	So
LB	18	Michael Topolinski	Jr
DE	62	Tyler Topolinski	Fr
DB	20	Jalen Watts-Jackson	Fr
CB	15	Trae Waynes	Jr
CB	21	Justin Williams	Fr
S	26	R. J. Williamson	Jr

Special teams

Pos.	#	Name	Class
K	24	Kevin Cronin
LS	56	Leland Ewing	Sr
K	4	Michael Geiger	So
P	25	Jake Hartbarger	Fr
LS	52	Taybor Pepper	Jr
P	3	Mike Sadler	Sr

Head coach

- Mark Dantonio

Coordinators/assistant coaches

- Pat Narduzzi – Assistant Head Coach/defensive coordinator
- Jim Bollman – Co-offensive coordinator/tight ends
- Dave Warner – Co-offensive coordinator/running backs
- Harlon Barnett – Secondary
- Ron Burton – Defensive line
- Brad Salem – Quarterbacks/recruiting coordinator
- Terrence Samuel – Wide receivers
- Mark Staten – Offensive line
- Mike Tressel – Linebackers/special teams

Legend

- (C) Team captain
- (S) Suspended
- (I) Ineligible
- Injured
- Redshirt

Roster
Last update: August 20, 2013

== Statistics ==
Passing

Note: Comp/Att = Completions/Attempts; Pct. = Completion percentage; Pass Rat. = Passer Rating

Player	Comp/Att	Pct.	Yards	TD	INT	Pass Rat.
Connor Cook	212/365	58.1	3214	24	8	149.4
Tyler O'Connor	12/16	75.0	151	2	1	183.0
Damion Terry	12/19	63.2	88	0	0	102.1
Totals	236/400	59.0	3453	26	9	148.5

Rushing

Player	Att	Yards	Avg	Long	TD
Jeremy Langford	276	1522	5.5	65	22
Nick Hill	107	622	5.8	76	9
Delton Williams	54	316	5.9	80	5
R.J. Shelton	21	148	7.0	30	2
Keith Mumphery	6	85	14.2	33	1
Connor Cook	51	80	1.6	13	2
Macgarrett Kings Jr.	12	71	5.9	23	0
Damion Terry	12	62	5.2	15	0
Tony Lippett	2	51	25.5	32	1
Gerald Holmes	15	44	2.9	8	0
Aaron Burbridge	8	39	4.9	15	0
Michael Geiger	2	29	14.5	23	0
Tyler O'Connor	6	22	3.7	12	2
Philip-Michael Williams	4	5	1.3	5	0
Connor Kruse	1	1	1.0	1	0
Lawrence Thomas	1	1	1.0	1	0
Totals	594	3057	5.1	80	44

Receiving

Player	Rec	Yards	Avg	Long	TD
Tony Lippett	65	1198	18.4	71	11
Keith Mumphery	26	495	19.0	62	3
Macgarrett Kings Jr.	29	404	13.9	50	1
Josiah Price	26	374	14.4	67	6
Aaron Burbridge	29	358	12.3	39	1
R.J. Shelton	16	173	10.8	24	2
AJ Troup	7	113	16.1	33	2
Jamal Lyles	5	74	14.8	21	0
Jeremy Langford	11	62	5.6	18	0
Monty Madaris	5	56	11.2	24	0
Nick Hill	4	48	12.0	16	0
Delton Williams	3	32	10.7	17	0
Andre Sims Jr.	3	26	8.7	20	0
Tres Barksdale	2	16	8.0	9	0
Andrew Gleichert	1	12	12.0	12	0
DeAnthony Arnett	2	11	5.5	6	0
Trevon Pendleton	1	2	2.0	2	0
Totals	236	3453	14.6	71	26

Kicking

Note: XPM = Extra point made; XPA = Extra Point Attempt; XP% = Extra point percentage; FGM = Field goal made; FGA = Field Goal Attempt; FG% = Field goal percentage; LNG = Longest make

Player	XPM	XPA	XP%	FGM	FGA	FG%	1–19	20–29	30–39	40–49	50+	LNG	Pts
Michael Geiger	72	72	100	14	22	63.6	0/0	4/4	7/10	3/8	0/0	42	114
Kevin Muma	1	1	100	0	0	0	0/0	0/0	0/0	0/0	0/0	0	1
Totals	73	73	100	14	22	63.6	0/0	4/4	7/10	3/8	0/0	42	115

Punting

Player	Punts	Yards	Avg	Inside 20	Long
Mike Sadler	52	2143	41.2	15	66

Punt Returns

Player	Returns	Yards	Avg	Long	TD
Macgarrett Kings	20	122	6.1	43	0
RJ Williamson	1	2	2.0	2	0
Andre Sims	1	3	3.0	3	0
Totals	22	127	5.8	43	0

Kick Returns

Player	Returns	Yards	Avg	Long	TD
R.J. Shelton	31	793	25.6	90	1
Riley Bullough	2	23	11.5	13	0
Nick Hill	2	30	15.0	17	0
Trevon Pendleton	1	19	19.0	19	0
Totals	36	865	24.0	90	1
