= 2015 Cotton Bowl Classic (January) =

2015 Goodyear Cotton Bowl Classic
- CFP New Year's Six; 79th Cotton Bowl Classic
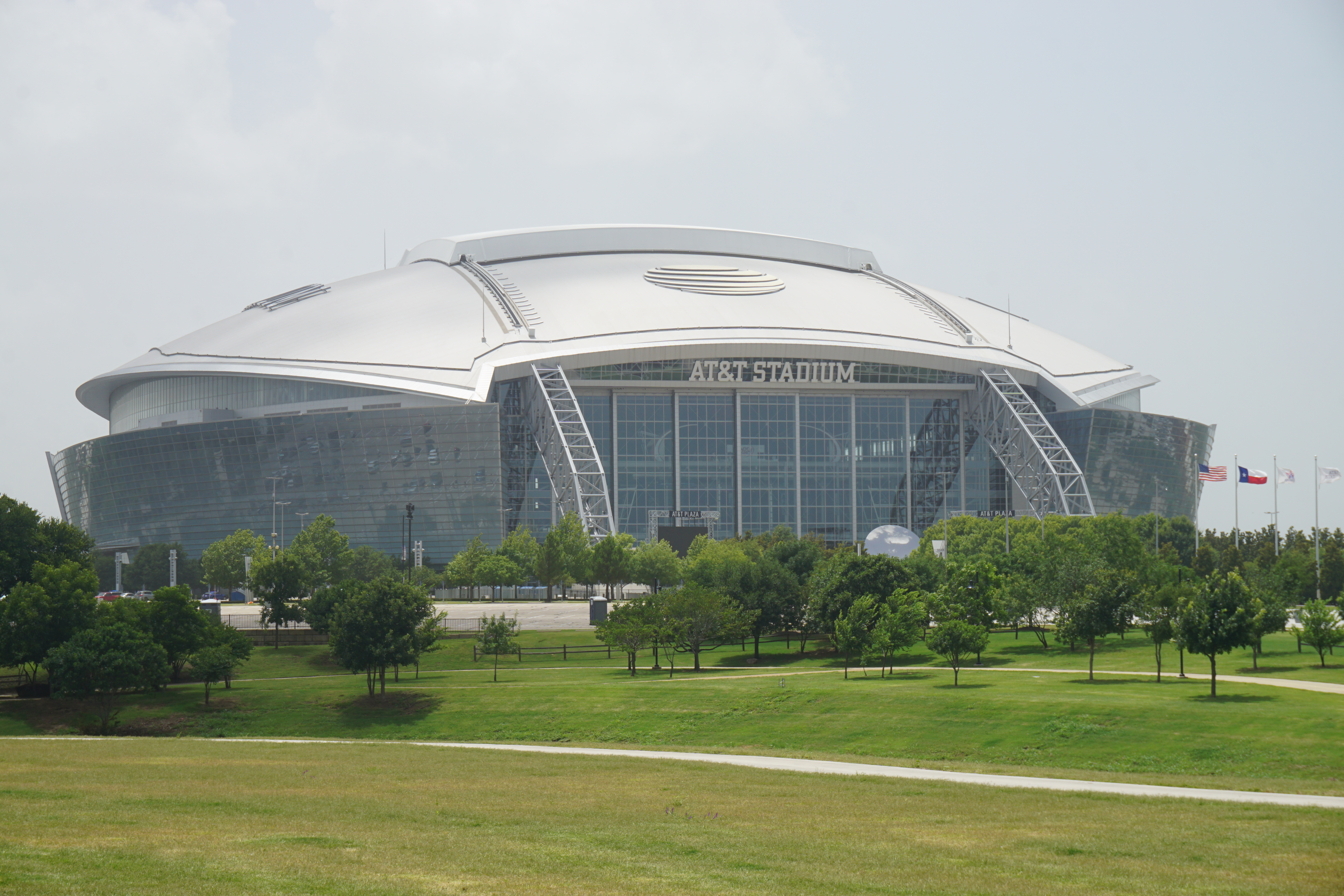
- AT&T Stadium in Arlington, Texas, hosted the Cotton Bowl Classic.
Michigan State Spartans	Baylor Bears
(10–2)	(11–1)
Big Ten	Big 12
42	41
Head coach: Mark Dantonio	Head coach: Art Briles
AP / Coaches / CFP; 7 / 7 / 8	AP / Coaches / CFP; 4 / 5 / 5
	1	2	3	4	Total
Michigan State	14	0	7	21	42
Baylor	14	10	17	0	41
- Date: January 1, 2015
- Season: 2014
- Stadium: AT&T Stadium
- Location: Arlington, Texas
- MVP: Offense: Baylor QB Bryce Petty; Defense: Baylor LB Taylor Young
- Favorite: Baylor by 3
- National anthem: Freddie Jones
- Referee: Jeff Flanagan (ACC)
- Attendance: 71,464

United States TV coverage
- Network: ESPN/ESPN Radio
- Announcers: Dave Pasch, Brian Griese, and Tom Luginbill/Brad Sham, Kelly Stouffer, and Ian Fitzsimmons
- Nielsen ratings: 5.2 (9.1 Million viewers)

The 2015 Cotton Bowl Classic was a college football bowl game played on January 1, 2015 at AT&T Stadium in Arlington, Texas. The 79th Cotton Bowl Classic was one of the "New Year's Six" bowls of the College Football Playoff. It was one of the 2014–15 bowl games that concluded the 2014 FBS football season. The game kicked off at 12:30 p.m. EST and was broadcast on ESPN, ESPN Deportes, ESPN Radio and XM Satellite Radio. It was sponsored by the Goodyear Tire and Rubber Company and was officially known as the Goodyear Cotton Bowl Classic.

From 1997 to 2013, the Cotton Bowl Classic pitted Big 12 Conference and Southeastern Conference teams against each other. In 2014, Michigan State was runner-up in the Big Ten Conference's East Division, and Baylor was Big 12 co-champion with TCU.

After falling behind by 20 points, Michigan State staged a dramatic comeback in the fourth quarter to beat Baylor by a score of 42–41. This was the highest scoring Cotton Bowl ever, and the fourth bowl game in a row for Michigan State where they won after trailing at halftime, all under head coach Mark Dantonio.

== Teams ==
The two participants for the game were the Michigan State Spartans and the Baylor Bears. Michigan State was the first Big Ten team to appear in the Cotton Bowl since Ohio State in 1987.

== Game summary ==
=== Pregame ===
The 79th Cotton Bowl Classic featured the Michigan State Spartans (10–2, 7–1 Big Ten) against the Big 12 Co-Champion Baylor Bears (11–1, 8–1 Big 12). Michigan State was making its first Cotton Bowl appearance while Baylor was making their third. Michigan State was designated as the away team and wore their typical white uniform with green helmet. Baylor, being the home team, wore an all green uniform with a gold chrome helmet (previously worn during their thrilling 61–58 win over TCU). Michigan State won the coin toss and elected to receive the opening kickoff.

=== First half ===
On Michigan State's first possession, Jeremy Langford broke open a career long 65 yard run down to the Baylor one yard line. Three plays later, Langford would finish the drive with a two-yard touchdown run. Baylor would quickly respond on the next drive. After driving the ball to midfield, quarterback Bryce Petty hit KD Cannon for a 49-yard touchdown to tie the game at seven. On the ensuing kickoff return MSU's RJ Shelton was able to reach the MSU 40 yard line, giving MSU great field position. Taking advantage, Connor Cook quickly hit Tony Lippett for a 24-yard gain. A few plays later RJ Shelton scored a touchdown on an 11-yard sweep, giving the Spartans a 14–7 lead. After stalled drives by both teams, Baylor tied the game on a 53-yard pass by wide receiver Jay Lee to Corey Coleman with 2:32 remaining in the quarter. To begin the second quarter, MSU drove the ball down to the Baylor 28 yard line. On third down Connor Cook attempted to option the ball to RJ Shelton, but the pass fell behind Williams and resulted in a loss of five yards. After a timeout, MSU lined up for a 50-yard field goal. Instead of kicking the ball, holder Mike Sadler flung the ball to kicker Michael Geiger attempted to run for the first down. Baylor quickly responded and stopped him short. With the ball, Baylor drove down the Spartan goal line and scored on a Bryce Petty QB sneak. Baylor led 21–14 with 8:13 remaining in the 1st half. After MSU's drive stalled at midfield Baylor drove the field and tacked on three points with a 25-yard field goal by Chris Callahan, which ended the scoring in the first half.

=== Second half ===
Baylor received the ball to begin the second half and quickly took advantage. On the second play, KD Cannon split the MSU secondary or a 74-yard touchdown reception (Cannon's second TD of the day) from Petty and increased Baylor's lead to 31–14. After a MSU three and out Baylor drove down and got in position for a 46-yard field goal by Callahan, giving the Bears a 34–14 lead with 11:23 remaining in the third. On the next drive, MSU drove to Baylor 45 yard line where they faced a 3rd and 4. On a key play of the second half, Cook hit Shelton on a shallow crossing pattern for a 19-yard gain. The following play saw Lippett gain 19 yards on a double reverse giving the Spartan's first and goal from the eight yard line. Three plays later the Spartan's punched it in on a two-yard Langford run, closing the score to 34–21. Baylor's next drive began with Shilique Calhoun sacking and forcing a Petty fumble, which was recovered by the Bears. On second down, Petty hit KD Cannon for another big gain to the MSU 44 yard line. Five plays later Petty hit wide open backup offensive guard LaQuan McGowan for an 18-yard TD, which set off a wild celebration amongst the Baylor sideline and their fans throughout AT&T Stadium. The score gave Baylor a 41–21 lead with 4:03 left in the quarter. On their next drive the Spartans were able to drive down to the Baylor 26, but the drive ended when Cook threw a pass into double coverage and was ultimately intercepted by Alfred Pullom. Baylor responded by moving the ball deep into MSU territory, but a penalty and an Ed Davis sack to close the quarter resulted in a third a 28 from the MSU 43 yard line. Baylor led the game 41–21 at the end of the third quarter. After failing to convert on third down, Chris Callahan set up for a 46-yard field goal attempt that would bounce off the right upright. MSU took over at their own 29 yard line. On the first play of the drive, Cook connected with Keith Mumphery for a 50-yard gain. Four plays later, Cook passed to Josiah Price in the corner of the end zone for an eight-yard touchdown. The score made it 41–28 with 12:09 remaining. On the ensuing kick-off, MSU kicker Kevin Cronin executed a successful onside kick (recovered by Jermaine Edmonson). With the ball and momentum, Cook connected down the Baylor sideline with Aaron Burbridge for a 39-yard gain to the Bears' 14 yard line. The ensuing play gave Baylor all of the momentum back as Connor Cook threw an interception to linebacker Taylor Young, who returned the ball all the way to the end zone for an apparent touchdown. Instead, a block in the back during the return brought the ball back to the Baylor 43 yard line. Six plays later Baylor would give the ball back to Michigan State after failing to convert on fourth down from the MSU 39. With 9:15 remaining in the game, MSU began their drive in an attempt to make the game closer. MSU managed to move the ball down to the Bear 11 yard line where Cook scrambled for an apparent touchdown. After instant replay overturned the score, Jeremy Langford ran it in to bring the score to 41–35 with 4:55 remaining in the game. Instead of attempting an onside kick, Michigan State elected to kick the ball deep and put the game in the hands of their defense. Baylor was able to move the ball downfield to the MSU 33 yard line and appeared in control of the game when a slant pass to Corey Coleman reached inside the five yard line. However, Coleman was flagged for an offensive facemask which brought the ball back to the 22 yard line. A false start, a short pass to the sideline for one yard, a rush for loss, and a short four yard gain to the flat resulted in a fourth down from the 27 yard line. With the clock under 1:15, Baylor attempted a 44-yard field goal. Chris Callahan moved the ball up two feet closer to the line and during the kick MSU senior defensive end Marcus Rush was able to get a hand on the ball, which resulted in the ball popping up and into RJ Williamson's hands. Williamson began to return the ball for MSU and was aided by a block on Chris Callahan by Tony Lippett. Williamson returned the ball to the Baylor 45 yard line where he was run out of bounds with 1:06 remaining.

With new life the MSU offense lined up and quickly completed a 17-yard pass to Mumphery. After failing to complete a pass during the following three plays, MSU faced fourth and ten. With the game on the line, Connor Cook was able to complete a 16-yard pass to Lippett. With first and goal, 33 seconds remaining and no timeouts, MSU had four chances to get a touchdown. After two poor throws from Cook, the Spartans faced third and goal with 22 seconds left. On third down, Cook hit Keith Mumphery for the go ahead touchdown with 17 seconds left. Baylor would get the ball back with only a field goal needed for the win.

On first down from their own 25 yard line, Petty was sacked by defensive tackle Lawrence Thomas for a six-yard loss. After a quick timeout and with only 13 seconds left on a second and long Petty was sacked again, this time by Marcus Rush and Riley Bullough, forcing Baylor to call a second timeout. Facing third and 23 from their own 12 yard line with only seven seconds left, Petty attempted to hit a quick slant over the middle. His pass was intercepted by a diving Riley Bullough, who essentially ended the game with only two seconds remaining. The MSU offense returned to the field for one kneel down, which ended the game and gave the Spartans the victory. Bowl chairman Dan Novakov awarded MSU head coach Mark Dantonio the Field Scovell Trophy in a post game ceremony.

=== Aftermath ===
The win resulted in Michigan State's school record fourth straight bowl win and second straight New Year's Day bowl win. Baylor's loss made it their third in the Cotton Bowl (0–3 all time). Despite losing, Baylor quarterback Bryce Petty and linebacker Taylor Young were awarded offensive and defensive MVP respectively. Michigan State finished the season ranked #5 in both polls (tied with Florida State in the AP poll) while Baylor finished #7 in the AP and #8 in the Coaches. Several Cotton Bowl records were set in the matchup including:
- Most combined points scored: 83
- Most combined yards: 1,146 yards

In addition, two records were set that became not only Cotton Bowl records, but all-bowl game records:
- Most passing yards: Bryce Petty – 550 yards (also an all-time bowl record)
- Most passing yards, team: Baylor - 603 yards

=== Scoring summary ===
2015 Goodyear Cotton Bowl Classic

Quarter	1	2	3	4	Total
No. 8 Michigan State	14	0	7	21	42
No. 5 Baylor	14	10	17	0	41

at AT&T Stadium • Arlington, Texas

- Date: Monday, January 1, 2015
- Game time: 11:30 a.m. CST
- Game weather: Indoor
- Game attendance: 71,464
- Referee: Jeff Flanagan (ACC)
- TV announcers (ESPN): Dave Pasch (play-by-play), Brian Griese (analyst) and Tom Luginbill (sideline)

Scoring summary

Quarter	Time	Drive			Team	Scoring information	Score	
Quarter	Time	Plays	Yards	TOP	Team	Scoring information	MSU	BAY
1	12:27	6	75	2:23	MSU	Jeremy Langford 2-yard touchdown run, Michael Geiger kick good	7	0
1	8:56	10	93	3:31	BAY	K. D. Cannon 49-yard touchdown reception from Bryce Petty, Chris Callahan kick good	7	7
1	5:06	7	60	3:50	MSU	R.J. Shelton 11-yard touchdown run, Michael Geiger kick good	14	7
1	2:32	3	66	0:35	BAY	Corey Coleman 53-yard touchdown reception from Jay Lee, Chris Callahan kick good	14	14
2	8:13	10	73	2:50	BAY	Bryce Petty 1-yard touchdown run, Chris Callahan kick good	14	21
2	3:14	6	77	1:48	BAY	25-yard field goal by Chris Callahan	14	24
3	14:32	2	76	0:19	BAY	K. D. Cannon 74-yard touchdown reception from Bryce Petty, Chris Callahan kick good	14	31
3	11:23	7	19	1:58	BAY	46-yard field goal by Chris Callahan	14	34
3	6:50	9	63	4:26	MSU	Jeremy Langford 2-yard touchdown run, Michael Geiger kick good	21	34
3	4:03	7	75	2:47	BAY	LaQuon McGowan 18-yard touchdown reception from Bryce Petty, Chris Callahan kick good	21	41
4	12:09	5	71	2:09	MSU	Josiah Price 8-yard touchdown reception from Connor Cook, Michael Geiger kick good	28	41
4	4:55	9	60	4:20	MSU	Jeremy Langford 1-yard touchdown run, Michael Geiger kick good	35	41
4	0:17	8	81	0:48	MSU	Keith Mumphery 10-yard touchdown reception from Connor Cook, Michael Geiger kick good	42	41
"TOP" = time of possession. For other American football terms, see Glossary of American football.							42	41

=== Statistics ===
Statistics	MSU	BAY
First downs	29	25
Plays–yards	88–552	74–583
Rushes–yards	46–238	22–20
Passing yards	314	603
Passing: Comp–Att–Int	24–42–2	37–52–1
Time of possession	36:42	23:18
