= Matt Sokol =

American football player (born 1995)

Profile
- Position: Tight end

Personal information
- Born: November 9, 1995 (age 30); Rochester, Michigan, U.S.
- Listed height: 6 ft 5 in (1.96 m)
- Listed weight: 249 lb (113 kg)

Career information
- High school: Adams (MI)
- College: Michigan State
- NFL draft: 2019: undrafted

Career history
- Los Angeles Chargers (2019)*; Jacksonville Jaguars (2019)*; Detroit Lions (2020)*; Los Angeles Chargers (2020); Jacksonville Jaguars (2021)*; Detroit Lions (2022)*; New England Patriots (2022–2023); Pittsburgh Steelers (2024)*; Buffalo Bills (2025)*; Pittsburgh Steelers (2025)*
- * Offseason or practice squad member only

Career NFL statistics as of 2025
- Games played: 8
- Stats at Pro Football Reference

Matthew Ryan Sokol (born November 9, 1995) is an American professional football tight end. He played college football for the Michigan State Spartans and began his career as undrafted free agent, landing his first roster spot in 2020 with the Los Angeles Chargers.

== Professional career ==
Pre-draft measurables
Height	Weight	Arm length	Hand span	40-yard dash	10-yard split	20-yard split	20-yard shuttle	Three-cone drill	Vertical jump	Broad jump	Bench press
6 ft 5 in (1.96 m)	253 lb (115 kg)	32 5/8 in (0.83 m)	8 3/4 in (0.22 m)	4.87 s	1.72 s	2.84 s	4.34 s	7.35 s	30.5 in (0.77 m)	9 ft 4 in (2.84 m)	23 reps
All values from Pro Day

=== Los Angeles Chargers (first stint) ===
Sokol signed with the Los Angeles Chargers as an undrafted free agent following the 2019 NFL draft on April 27, 2019. He was waived during final roster cuts on August 31, 2019, and signed to the team's practice squad the next day. He was released on September 18, and re-signed to the practice squad on October 1. He was released again on October 9, 2019.

=== Jacksonville Jaguars (first stint) ===
Sokol signed with the Jacksonville Jaguars' practice squad on November 18, 2019.

=== Detroit Lions ===
Sokol signed a reserve/future contract with the Detroit Lions on December 31, 2019. He was waived during final roster cuts on September 5, 2020, and signed to the team's practice squad on October 21, 2020. He was released three days later.

=== Los Angeles Chargers (second stint) ===
Sokol re-signed with the Chargers' practice squad on October 31, 2020. He was elevated to the active roster on December 26 for the team's week 16 game against the Denver Broncos, and reverted to the practice squad after the game. He was promoted to the active roster on January 1, 2021.

On August 31, 2021, Sokol was waived by the Chargers.

=== Jacksonville Jaguars (second stint) ===
Sokol re-signed with the Jaguars' practice squad on September 2, 2021.

=== Detroit Lions (second stint) ===
On January 12, 2022, Sokol signed a reserve/future contract with the Lions. He was waived on May 10.

=== New England Patriots ===
On May 11, 2022, Sokol was claimed off waivers by the New England Patriots. He was waived on August 30, and signed to the practice squad the next day. He signed a reserve/future contract on January 10, 2023.

On August 29, 2023, Sokol was waived by the Patriots and re-signed to the practice squad. He was not among the team's players signed to reserve/future contracts in 2024, and thus became a free agent at the expiration of his practice squad contract.

=== Pittsburgh Steelers (first stint) ===
On July 30, 2024, Sokol signed with the Pittsburgh Steelers. He was waived on August 27, and later re-signed to the practice squad. Sokol was released on September 24. He again signed to the practice squad on November 6.

=== Buffalo Bills ===
On July 22, 2025, Sokol signed with the Buffalo Bills. He was waived on August 24.

=== Pittsburgh Steelers (second stint) ===
On September 17, 2025, Sokol signed with the Pittsburgh Steelers' practice squad.
