= 2014 Oregon State Beavers football team =

American college football season

2014 Oregon State Beavers football
- Conference: Pac-12 Conference
- North Division
- Record: 5–7 (2–7 Pac-12)
- Head coach: Mike Riley (14th season)
- Offensive coordinator: John Garrett (1st season)
- Offensive scheme: Pro-style
- Defensive coordinator: Mark Banker (12th season)
- Base defense: 4–3
- Home stadium: Reser Stadium

2014 Pac-12 Conference football standings
	Conf.			Overall
Team	W		L	W		L
North Division
No. 2 Oregon xy$^	8	–	1	13	–	2
Stanford	5	–	4	8	–	5
Washington	4	–	5	8	–	6
California	3	–	6	5	–	7
Oregon State	2	–	7	5	–	7
Washington State	2	–	7	3	–	9
South Division
No. 19 Arizona xy	7	–	2	10	–	4
No. 10 UCLA	6	–	3	10	–	3
No. 12 Arizona State	6	–	3	10	–	3
No. 20 USC	6	–	3	9	–	4
No. 21 Utah	5	–	4	9	–	4
Colorado	0	–	9	2	–	10
Championship: Oregon 51, Arizona 13
^ – College Football Playoff participant; $ – Conference champion; x – Division champion/co-champions; y – Championship game participant; Rankings from AP Poll

The 2014 Oregon State Beavers football team represented Oregon State University during the 2014 NCAA Division I FBS football season. The team was led by head coach Mike Riley, in his 12th straight season and 14th overall. Home games were played on campus at Reser Stadium in Corvallis and were a member of the North Division of the Pac-12 Conference. They finished the season 5–7, 2–7 in Pac-12 play to finish in a tie for fifth place in the North Division.

On December 4, head coach Mike Riley resigned to take the same position at Nebraska.

== Schedule ==
Date	Time	Opponent	Site	TV	Result	Attendance
August 30	1:00 pm	Portland State*	Reser Stadium; Corvallis, OR	P12N	W 29–14	40,309
September 6	7:30 pm	at Hawaii*	Aloha Stadium; Honolulu, HI	CBSSN	W 38–30	29,050
September 20	7:30 pm	San Diego State*	Reser Stadium; Corvallis, OR	FS1	W 28–7	41,339
September 27	7:30 pm	at No. 18 USC	Los Angeles Memorial Coliseum; Los Angeles, CA	ESPN	L 10–35	74,521
October 4	1:00 pm	at Colorado	Folsom Field; Boulder, CO	P12N	W 36–31	36,415
October 16	7:00 pm	No. 20 Utah	Reser Stadium; Corvallis, OR	P12N	L 23–29 ^{2OT}	40,479
October 25	12:30 pm	at Stanford	Stanford Stadium; Stanford, CA	ESPN2	L 14–38	48,401
November 1	7:30 pm	California^{†}	Reser Stadium; Corvallis, OR	P12N	L 31–45	42,479
November 8	1:00 pm	Washington State	Reser Stadium; Corvallis, OR	P12N	L 32–39	44,377
November 15	7:45 pm	No. 7 Arizona State	Reser Stadium; Corvallis, OR	ESPN	W 35–27	40,525
November 22	7:30 pm	at Washington	Husky Stadium; Seattle, WA	P12N	L 13–37	65,036
November 29	5:00 pm	No. 3 Oregon	Reser Stadium; Corvallis, OR (Civil War)	ABC	L 19–47	45,722
*Non-conference game; ^{†}Homecoming; Rankings from AP Poll released prior to the game; All times are in Pacific time

== Roster ==
- QB Sean Mannion, Sr.

== Game summaries ==
=== Portland State ===
	1	2	3	4	Total
Vikings	0	14	0	0	14
Beavers	6	7	13	3	29

=== Hawaii ===
	1	2	3	4	Total
Beavers	14	17	7	0	38
Rainbow Warriors	0	7	0	23	30

=== San Diego State ===
	1	2	3	4	Total
Aztecs	7	0	0	0	7
Beavers	7	7	14	0	28

=== USC ===
	1	2	3	4	Total
Beavers	7	3	0	0	10
Trojans	7	14	0	14	35

=== Colorado ===
	1	2	3	4	Total
Beavers	17	3	3	13	36
Buffaloes	7	14	0	10	31

=== Utah ===
	1	2	3	4	OT	2OT	Total
#20 Utes	6	0	3	7	7	6	29
Beavers	0	6	0	10	7	0	23

=== Stanford ===
	1	2	3	4	Total
Beavers	7	0	0	7	14
Cardinal	14	14	7	3	38

=== California ===
	1	2	3	4	Total
Golden Bears	3	17	7	18	45
Beavers	0	10	14	7	31

=== Washington State ===
	1	2	3	4	Total
Cougars	7	14	3	15	39
Beavers	10	6	6	10	32

=== Arizona State ===
	1	2	3	4	Total
Sun Devils	10	14	0	3	27
Beavers	14	0	7	14	35

=== Washington ===
	1	2	3	4	Total
Beavers	0	7	6	0	13
Huskies	14	3	6	14	37

=== Oregon ===
	1	2	3	4	Total
#3 Ducks	9	21	10	7	47
Beavers	0	3	7	9	19
