= 2014 Utah Utes football team =

American college football season

2014 Utah Utes football

Las Vegas Bowl champion

Las Vegas Bowl, W 45–10 vs. Colorado State
- Conference: Pac-12 Conference
- South Division

Ranking
- Coaches: No. 20
- AP: No. 21
- Record: 9–4 (5–4 Pac-12)
- Head coach: Kyle Whittingham (10th season)
- Offensive coordinator: Dave Christensen (1st season)
- Offensive scheme: Multiple
- Defensive coordinator: Kalani Sitake (6th season)
- Base defense: 4–3
- Home stadium: Rice-Eccles Stadium

2014 Pac-12 Conference football standings
	Conf.			Overall
Team	W		L	W		L
North Division
No. 2 Oregon xy$^	8	–	1	13	–	2
Stanford	5	–	4	8	–	5
Washington	4	–	5	8	–	6
California	3	–	6	5	–	7
Oregon State	2	–	7	5	–	7
Washington State	2	–	7	3	–	9
South Division
No. 19 Arizona xy	7	–	2	10	–	4
No. 10 UCLA	6	–	3	10	–	3
No. 12 Arizona State	6	–	3	10	–	3
No. 20 USC	6	–	3	9	–	4
No. 21 Utah	5	–	4	9	–	4
Colorado	0	–	9	2	–	10
Championship: Oregon 51, Arizona 13
^ – College Football Playoff participant; $ – Conference champion; x – Division champion/co-champions; y – Championship game participant; Rankings from AP Poll

The 2014 Utah Utes football team represented the University of Utah during the 2014 NCAA Division I FBS football season. The team was coached by tenth year head coach Kyle Whittingham and played their home games in Rice-Eccles Stadium in Salt Lake City, Utah. They were members of the South Division of the Pac-12 Conference. They finished the season 9–4, 5–4 in Pac-12 play to finish in fifth place in the South Division. They were invited to the Las Vegas Bowl, where they defeated Colorado State.

== Schedule ==
Date	Time	Opponent	Rank	Site	TV	Result	Attendance
August 28	5:30 p.m.	Idaho State*		Rice-Eccles Stadium; Salt Lake City, UT	P12N	W 56–14	45,925
September 6	1:00 p.m.	Fresno State*		Rice-Eccles Stadium; Salt Lake City, UT	P12N	W 59–27	45,864
September 20	1:30 p.m.	at Michigan*		Michigan Stadium; Ann Arbor, MI	ABC/ESPN2	W 26–10	103,890
September 27	6:00 p.m.	Washington State^{†}		Rice-Eccles Stadium; Salt Lake City, UT	P12N	L 27–28	45,859
October 4	8:30 p.m.	at No. 8 UCLA		Rose Bowl; Pasadena, CA	ESPN	W 30–28	74,329
October 16	8:00 p.m.	at Oregon State	No. 20	Reser Stadium; Corvallis, OR	P12N	W 29–23 ^{2OT}	40,479
October 25	8:00 p.m.	No. 20 USC	No. 19	Rice-Eccles Stadium; Salt Lake City, UT	FS1	W 24–21	47,619
November 1	9:00 p.m.	at No. 14 Arizona State	No. 17	Sun Devil Stadium; Tempe, AZ	FS1	L 16–19 ^{OT}	53,754
November 8	8:00 p.m.	No. 4 Oregon	No. 17	Rice-Eccles Stadium; Salt Lake City, UT	ESPN	L 27–51	47,528
November 15	4:00 p.m.	at Stanford	No. 23	Stanford Stadium; Stanford, CA	P12N	W 20–17 ^{2OT}	44,635
November 22	1:30 p.m.	No. 15 Arizona	No. 17	Rice-Eccles Stadium; Salt Lake City, UT	ESPN	L 10–42	45,824
November 29	11:00 a.m.	at Colorado	No. 25	Folsom Field; Boulder, CO (Rumble in the Rockies)	P12N	W 38–34	39,155
December 20	1:30 p.m.	vs. Colorado State*	No. 22	Sam Boyd Stadium; Whitney, NV (Las Vegas Bowl)	ABC	W 45–10	33,067
*Non-conference game; ^{†}Homecoming; Rankings from AP Poll and CFP Rankings after October 28 released prior to game; All times are in Mountain time

== Rankings ==
Ranking movements Legend: ██ Increase in ranking ██ Decrease in ranking — = Not ranked RV = Received votes
	Week																
Poll	Pre	1	2	3	4	5	6	7	8	9	10	11	12	13	14	15	Final
AP	—	—	RV	—	RV	—	24	20	19	18	20	25	20	RV	24	23	21
Coaches	—	—	—	—	RV	—	RV	23	19	18	22	RV	21	RV	RV	25	20
CFP	Not released									17	17	23	17	25	23	22	Not released

== Coaching staff ==
Name	Position	Seasons at Utah
Kyle Whittingham	Head coach	10th
Dave Christensen	Offensive coordinator	1st
Kalani Sitake	Defensive coordinator	6th
Dennis Erickson	Running backs/assistant coach	2nd
Aaron Roderick	Quarterbacks coach	10th
Jim Harding	Offensive line	1st
Ilaisa Tuiaki	Defensive line	2nd
Morgan Scalley	Safeties/special time coordinator	7th
Sharrieff Shah	Cornerbacks coach	3rd
Taylor Stubblefield	Wide receivers coach	1st
Robert Conley	Co-graduate assistant/defense	3rd
Joe Dale	Co-graduate assistant/defense	1st
Nick Danielson	Co-graduate assistant/offense	1st
Sartaj Khan	Co-graduate assistant/offense	1st
Doug Elisaia	Director of strength & conditioning	8th
Jeff Rudy	Football operations director	8th
Ernest Rimer	Football director of sport science	1st
Freddie Whittingham	Director of player personnel	3rd

== Game summaries ==
=== Idaho State ===
	1	2	3	4	Total
Bengals	7	0	7	0	14
Utes	14	21	14	7	56

Game officials: referee Jack Folliard, umpire Douglas Wilson, head linesman Bob Day, line judge Jeff Robinsoni, side judge Aaron Santi, field judge Brad Glenn, back judge Steve Hudson, head replay official Jim Northcott

=== Fresno State ===
	1	2	3	4	Total
Bulldogs	0	7	7	13	27
Utes	17	14	14	14	59

Game officials: referee Terry Leyden, umpire F. Villar, head linesman Rod Ammari, line judge Tim Messuri, side judge Aaron Santi, field judge S. Strimling, back judge Mearl Robinson

=== At Michigan ===
	1	2	3	4	Total
Utes	3	10	7	6	26
Wolverines	3	7	0	0	10

Game officials: referee S. Smith, umpire S. Woods, head linesman M. Dolce, line judge J. Baur, side judge D. Swanson, field judge J. Clay, back judge T. Ransom

=== Washington State ===
	1	2	3	4	Total
Cougars	0	7	7	14	28
Utes	21	3	0	3	27

=== At No. 8 UCLA ===
	1	2	3	4	Total
Utes	7	10	7	6	30
No. 8 Bruins	0	7	7	14	28

=== At Oregon State ===
	1	2	3	4	OT	2OT	Total
No. 20 Utes	6	0	3	7	7	6	29
Beavers	0	6	0	10	7	0	23

=== No. 20 USC ===
	1	2	3	4	Total
No. 20 Trojans	7	7	0	7	21
No. 19 Utes	7	3	7	7	24

=== At No. 14 Arizona State ===
	1	2	3	4	OT	Total
No. 17 Utes	0	6	10	0	0	16
No. 14 Sun Devils	6	7	0	3	3	19

=== No. 4 Oregon ===
	1	2	3	4	Total
No. 4 Ducks	0	24	3	24	51
No. 17 Utes	7	3	10	7	27

=== At Stanford ===
	1	2	3	4	OT	2OT	Total
No. 23 Utes	0	7	0	0	7	6	20
Cardinal	7	0	0	0	7	3	17

=== No. 15 Arizona ===
	1	2	3	4	Total
No. 15 Wildcats	7	14	0	21	42
No. 17 Utes	0	7	3	0	10

=== At Colorado ===
	1	2	3	4	Total
No. 25 Utes	3	13	15	7	38
Buffaloes	7	17	10	0	34

=== Vs. Colorado State (Las Vegas Bowl) ===
	1	2	3	4	Total
Rams	10	0	0	0	10
No. 22 Utes	21	3	7	14	45

== Notes ==
- September 1, 2014 – wide receiver Kaelin Clay named Pac-12 Conference special teams player of the week
