= 2014 Colorado Buffaloes football team =

American college football season

2014 Colorado Buffaloes football
- Conference: Pac-12 Conference
- South Division
- Record: 2–10 (0–9 Pac-12)
- Head coach: Mike MacIntyre (2nd season)
- Offensive coordinator: Brian Lindgren (2nd season)
- Offensive scheme: Pro–style
- Defensive coordinator: Kent Baer (2nd season)
- Base defense: 4–3
- Home stadium: Folsom Field

2014 Pac-12 Conference football standings
	Conf.			Overall
Team	W		L	W		L
North Division
No. 2 Oregon xy$^	8	–	1	13	–	2
Stanford	5	–	4	8	–	5
Washington	4	–	5	8	–	6
California	3	–	6	5	–	7
Oregon State	2	–	7	5	–	7
Washington State	2	–	7	3	–	9
South Division
No. 19 Arizona xy	7	–	2	10	–	4
No. 10 UCLA	6	–	3	10	–	3
No. 12 Arizona State	6	–	3	10	–	3
No. 20 USC	6	–	3	9	–	4
No. 21 Utah	5	–	4	9	–	4
Colorado	0	–	9	2	–	10
Championship: Oregon 51, Arizona 13
^ – College Football Playoff participant; $ – Conference champion; x – Division champion/co-champions; y – Championship game participant; Rankings from AP Poll

The 2014 Colorado Buffaloes football team represented the University of Colorado at Boulder during the 2014 NCAA Division I FBS football season. Led by second-year head coach Mike MacIntyre, the Buffaloes played their home games on-campus at Folsom Field in Boulder and were members of the South Division of the Pac-12 Conference. They finished the season 2–10, 0–9 in Pac-12 play to finish in last place in the South Division.

== Schedule ==
Date	Time	Opponent	Site	TV	Result	Attendance
August 29	7:00 p.m.	vs. Colorado State*	Sports Authority Field at Mile High; Denver, CO (Rocky Mountain Showdown)	FS1	L 17–31	63,363
September 6	1:00 p.m.	at UMass*	Gillette Stadium; Foxborough, MA	ESPN3	W 41–38	10,227
September 13	8:00 p.m.	No. 16 Arizona State	Folsom Field; Boulder, CO	ESPNU	L 24–38	38,547
September 20	11:00 a.m.	Hawaii*	Folsom Field; Boulder, CO	P12N	W 21–12	39,478
September 27	2:00 p.m.	at California	California Memorial Stadium; Berkeley, CA	P12N	L 56–59 ^{2OT}	39,821
October 4	2:00 p.m.	Oregon State	Folsom Field; Boulder, CO	P12N	L 31–36	36,415
October 18	4:00 p.m.	at No. 22 USC	Los Angeles Memorial Coliseum; Los Angeles, CA	P12N	L 28–56	74,756
October 25	12:00 p.m.	No. 25 UCLA^{†}	Folsom Field; Boulder, CO	P12N	L 37–40 ^{2OT}	37,442
November 1	11:00 a.m.	Washington	Folsom Field; Boulder, CO	P12N	L 23–38	35,633
November 8	6:00 p.m.	at No. 21 Arizona	Arizona Stadium; Tucson, AZ	P12N	L 20–38	50,177
November 22	2:30 p.m.	at No. 3 Oregon	Autzen Stadium; Eugene, OR	P12N	L 10–44	55,898
November 29	11:00 a.m.	Utah	Folsom Field; Boulder, CO (Rumble in the Rockies)	P12N	L 34–38	39,155
*Non-conference game; ^{†}Homecoming; Rankings from AP Poll released prior to the game; All times are in Mountain time

== Game summaries ==
=== Colorado State ===
	1	2	3	4	Total
Rams	0	7	7	17	31
Buffaloes	7	3	7	0	17

=== Massachusetts ===
	1	2	3	4	Total
Buffaloes	3	17	14	7	41
Minutemen	7	14	10	7	38

=== Arizona State ===
	1	2	3	4	Total
#16 Sun Devils	14	10	14	0	38
Buffaloes	0	14	3	7	24

=== Hawaii ===
	1	2	3	4	Total
Rainbow Warriors	3	3	6	0	12
Buffaloes	7	14	0	0	21

=== California ===
	1	2	3	4	OT	2OT	Total
Buffaloes	21	7	7	14	7	0	56
Golden Bears	7	7	21	14	7	3	59

=== Oregon State ===
	1	2	3	4	Total
Beavers	17	3	3	13	36
Buffaloes	7	14	0	10	31

=== USC ===
	1	2	3	4	Total
Buffaloes	0	7	14	7	28
#22 Trojans	28	7	21	0	56

=== UCLA ===
	1	2	3	4	OT	2OT	Total
#25 Bruins	17	7	7	0	3	6	40
Buffaloes	0	14	0	17	3	3	37

=== Washington ===
	1	2	3	4	Total
Huskies	7	10	14	7	38
Buffaloes	10	10	3	0	23

=== Arizona ===
	1	2	3	4	Total
Buffaloes	7	10	3	0	20
#19 Wildcats	7	14	3	14	38

=== Oregon ===
	1	2	3	4	Total
Buffaloes	0	3	7	0	10
#3 Ducks	13	17	14	0	44

=== Utah ===
	1	2	3	4	Total
Utes	3	13	15	7	38
Buffaloes	7	17	10	0	34
