= 2014 California Golden Bears football team =

American college football season

2014 California Golden Bears football
- Conference: Pac-12 Conference
- North Division
- Record: 5–7 (3–6 Pac-12)
- Head coach: Sonny Dykes (2nd season)
- Offensive coordinator: Tony Franklin (2nd season)
- Offensive scheme: Bear raid
- Defensive coordinator: Art Kaufman (1st season)
- Base defense: 4–3
- Home stadium: California Memorial Stadium; Levi's Stadium

2014 Pac-12 Conference football standings
	Conf.			Overall
Team	W		L	W		L
North Division
No. 2 Oregon xy$^	8	–	1	13	–	2
Stanford	5	–	4	8	–	5
Washington	4	–	5	8	–	6
California	3	–	6	5	–	7
Oregon State	2	–	7	5	–	7
Washington State	2	–	7	3	–	9
South Division
No. 19 Arizona xy	7	–	2	10	–	4
No. 10 UCLA	6	–	3	10	–	3
No. 12 Arizona State	6	–	3	10	–	3
No. 20 USC	6	–	3	9	–	4
No. 21 Utah	5	–	4	9	–	4
Colorado	0	–	9	2	–	10
Championship: Oregon 51, Arizona 13
^ – College Football Playoff participant; $ – Conference champion; x – Division champion/co-champions; y – Championship game participant; Rankings from AP Poll

The 2014 California Golden Bears football team represented the University of California, Berkeley in the 2014 NCAA Division I FBS football season. The Bears were led by second-year head coach Sonny Dykes and played their home games at Memorial Stadium. They were members of the North Division of the Pac-12 Conference. When compared to 2013, Cal improved to 5–7, starting out with a 4–1 start, but losing six of their last seven games. It averaged 38.3 points per game, second-best in the Pac-12 and 11th-best in FBS, generating a program-record 459 total points for the season. However, the Golden Bears lost 367.2 passing yards per game along with 42 total passing touchdowns, both of these numbers ranked last out of 128 FBS teams.

From Week 3 to Week 5, the Bears played three consecutive high-scoring games that were won or lost in the final seconds. The Bears lost on a Hail Mary to Arizona 49–45, but beat Colorado 59–56 in double overtime in their next game. The following week, Dykes faced his former Air Raid mentor Mike Leach and the Washington State Cougars. California allowed an FBS record 734 passing yards to Cougars' senior quarterback Connor Halliday, but still won 60–59 when WSU missed a 19-yard field goal with 15 seconds to play. They finished 3–6 in Pac-12, in fourth place in the North Division.

== Schedule ==
Date	Time	Opponent	Site	TV	Result	Attendance
August 30	12:30 p.m.	at Northwestern*	Ryan Field; Evanston, IL	ABC/ESPN2	W 31–24	34,228
September 6	12:00 p.m.	Sacramento State*	California Memorial Stadium; Berkeley, CA	P12N	W 55–14	48,145
September 20	7:00 p.m.	at Arizona	Arizona Stadium; Tucson, AZ	P12N	L 45–49	45,595
September 27	1:00 p.m.	Colorado	California Memorial Stadium; Berkeley, CA	P12N	W 59–56 ^{2OT}	39,821
October 4	7:30 p.m.	at Washington State	Martin Stadium; Pullman, WA	P12N	W 60–59	30,020
October 11	3:00 p.m.	Washington^{†}	California Memorial Stadium; Berkeley, CA	P12N	L 7–31	44,449
October 18	12:30 p.m.	UCLA	California Memorial Stadium; Berkeley, CA (rivalry)	ABC/ESPN2	L 34–36	49,257
October 24	7:00 p.m.	No. 6 Oregon	Levi's Stadium; Santa Clara, CA	FS1	L 41–59	55,575
November 1	7:30 p.m.	at Oregon State	Reser Stadium; Corvallis, OR	P12N	W 45–31	42,479
November 13	6:00 p.m.	at USC	Los Angeles Memorial Coliseum; Los Angeles, CA	ESPN	L 30–38	64,615
November 22	1:00 p.m.	Stanford	California Memorial Stadium; Berkeley, CA (Big Game)	FS1	L 17–38	56,483
November 29	1:30 p.m.	BYU*	California Memorial Stadium; Berkeley, CA	P12N	L 35–42	47,856
*Non-conference game; ^{†}Homecoming; Rankings from AP Poll released prior to the game; All times are in Pacific time

== Personnel ==
2014 California Golden Bears football team roster
Players
Coaches
Offense

Pos.	#	Name	Class
OL		Chris Adcock	Sr
WR		Stephen Anderson	Sr
WR		Jake Ashton	Fr
WR		Jack Austin	Fr
OL		Aaron Cochran	Fr
WR		Caleb Coleman	Fr
WR		Trevor Davis	Jr
RB		Vic Enwere	Fr
RB		Lucas Gingold	Sr
QB		Jared Goff	So
WR		Chris Harper	Jr
WR		Maurice Harris	Jr
QB		Austin Hinder	Sr
WR		Raymond Hudson	Fr
RB		Patrick Laird	Fr
RB		Daniel Lasco	Jr
WR		Kenny Lawler	So
WR		Bryce McGovern	Sr
OL		Steven Moore	So
RB		Khalfani Muhammad	So
WR		Griffin Platt	So
WR		Darius Powe	Jr
WR		Matt Rockett	Fr
QB		Luke Rubenzer	Fr
LB		Bryce Treggs	Jr
RB		Tre Watson	Fr
WR		Patrick Worstell	So

Defense

Pos.	#	Name	Class
CB		Darius Allensworth	Fr
LB		Hamilton Anoa'i	Fr
DE		Todd Barr	Jr
LB		Michael Barton	So
CB		Trey Cheek	Fr
DT		Austin Clark	Sr
S		Cormac Craigie	Jr
DE		Antoine Davis	Jr
DT		David Davis	Jr
LB		Raymond Davison	Fr
LB		Devante Downs	Fr
DB		Cedric Dozier	So
DE		Kennedy Emesibe	Fr
S		David Garner	So
CB		A.J. Greathouse	Fr
DT		Mustafa Jalil	Sr
LB		Jalen Jefferson	Jr
DE		Jonathan Johnson	Jr
LB		Jake Kearney	So
DT		Trevor Kelly	Jr
DE		Puka Lopa	Jr
S		Michael Lowe	Sr
DE		Marcus Manley	So
DB		Stefan McClure	Jr
DL		Tony Mekari	Fr
LB		Hardy Nickerson	So
LB		Brennan Scarlett	Sr
DB		Avery Sebastian	Jr
LB		Edward Tandy	So
LB		Alsea Tongilava	Fr
LB		Arthur Wainwright	Jr
CB		Cameron Walker	So
DE		Noah Westerfield	Fr
CB		Darius White	Jr
DT		Harrison Wilfley	Sr
DB		Joel Willis	Jr

Special teams

Pos.	#	Name	Class
K		Jeremy Langford	Sr
P		Cole Leininger	So

Head coach

- Sonny Dykes

Coordinators/assistant coaches

Legend

- (C) Team captain
- (S) Suspended
- (I) Ineligible
- Injured
- Redshirt

== Game summaries ==
- February 7, 2014 – Defensive end Ted Agu, collapsed and died after a training run

=== Northwestern ===
Team	1	2	3	4	Total
• California	14	10	7	0	31
Northwestern	0	7	14	3	24

- Date: August 30
- Location: Ryan Field
- Game start: 3:30
- TV announcers (ABC/ESPN2): Mark Jones, Rod Gilmore, and Jessica Mendoza

=== Sacramento State ===
Team	1	2	3	4	Total
Sacramento St	0	7	7	0	14
• California	28	17	10	0	55

- Date: September 6
- Location: California Memorial Stadium
- TV announcers (Pac12 Network Bay Area): JB Long, Mike Pawlawski, and Guy Haberman

=== At Arizona ===
California Golden Bears (2–0) at Arizona Wildcats (3–0)

Quarter	1	2	3	4	Total
California	14	14	3	14	45
Arizona	0	6	7	36	49

at Arizona Stadium, Tucson, Arizona

- Date: September 20, 2014
- Game time: 7:00 p.m. MST
- Game weather: Partly cloudy; 83 °F (28 °C); Wind 6 miles per hour (9.7 km/h; 5.2 kn)
- Game attendance: 45,595
- Referee: Terry Leyden
- TV announcers (Pac-12 Network): Kevin Calabro, Glenn Parker, and Jill Savage

Game information

First quarter

- CAL – Daniel Lasco 44-yard run (James Langford kick), 14:17. California 7–0. Drive: 3 plays, 75 yards, 0:43.
- CAL – Bryce Treggs 80-yard pass from Jared Goff (James Langford kick), 11:53. California 14–0. Drive: 1 play, 80 yards, 0:13.

Second quarter

- ARZ – Casey Skowron 39-yard field goal, 10:39. California 14–3. Drive: 7 plays, 39 yards, 2:18.
- CAL – Stephen Anderson 26-yard pass from Jared Goff (Jeremy Langford kick), 8:55. California 21–3. Drive: 5 plays, 75 yards, 1:44.
- ARZ – Casey Skowron 28-yard field goal, 5:28. California 21–6. Drive: 13 plays, 65 yards, 5:27.
- CAL – Chris Harper 30-yard pass from Jared Goff (Jeremy Langford kick), 3:43. California 28–6. Drive: 4 plays, 75 yards, 1:45.

Third quarter

- ARZ – Cayleb Jones 41-yard pass from Anu Solomon (Casey Skowron kick), 11:02. California 28–13. Drive: 8 plays, 96 yards, 1:54.
- CAL – Jeremy Langford 45-yard field goal, 8:28. California 31–13. Drive: 9 plays, 48 yards, 2:34.'

Fourth quarter

- ARZ – Casey Skowron 31-yard field goal, 14:46. California 31–16. Drive: 7 plays, 39 yards, 2:04.
- ARZ – Austin Hill 9-yard pass from Anu Solomon (Casey Skowron kick), 13:36. California 31–23. Drive: 2 plays, 17 yards, 0:32.
- CAL – Khalfani Muhammad 50-yard run (Jeremy Langford kick), 10:56. California 38–23. Drive: 6 plays, 75 yards, 2:40.
- ARZ – Cayleb Jones 16-yard pass from Anu Solomon (Casey Skowron kick), 8:09. California 38–30. Drive: 9 plays, 75 yards, 2:47.
- CAL – Khalfani Muhammad 6-yard run (Jeremy Langford kick), 5:21. California 45–30. Drive: 6 plays, 75 yards, 2:48.
- ARZ – Terris Jones-Grigsby 6-yard run (Casey Skowron kick), 3:30. California 45–37. Drive: 8 plays, 75 yards, 1:51.
- ARZ – Cayleb Jones 15-yard pass from Anu Solomon (pass failed), 2:44. California 45–43. Drive: 4 plays, 41 yards, 0:43. *ARZ – Austin Hill 47-yard pass from Anu Solomon, 0:00. Arizona 49–45. Drive: 6 plays, 70 yards, 0:52.

Top passers

- CAL – Jared Goff – 18/30, 380 yards, 3 TD, int
- ARZ – Anu Solomon – 47/73, 520 yards, 5 TD, 2 int

Top rushers

- CAL – Daniel Lasco – 20 rushes, 123 yards, TD
- ARZ – Anu Solomon – 16 rushes, 46 yards

Top receivers

- CAL – Bryce Treggs – 5 receptions, 119 yards, TD
- ARZ – Cayleb Jones – 13 receptions, 186 yards, 3 TD

=== Colorado ===
Team	1	2	3	4	OT	2OT	Total
Colorado	21	7	7	14	7	0	56
• California	7	7	21	14	7	3	59

- Date: September 27
- Location: California Memorial Stadium
- Game start: 4:00
- TV announcers (Pac12 Network): Kevin Calabro, Yogi Roth, and Lewis Johnson

=== Washington State ===
Team	1	2	3	4	Total
• California	0	13	28	19	60
Washington St	10	14	28	7	59

- Date: October 4
- Location: Martin Stadium
- Game start: 10:30
- TV announcers (Pac12 Network): Kevin Calabro, Yogi Roth, and Lewis Johnson

=== Washington ===
Team	1	2	3	4	Total
• Washington	14	14	0	3	31
California	0	0	7	0	7

- Date: October 11
- Location: California Memorial Stadium
- Game start: 6:00
- TV announcers (Pac12 Network): Ted Robinson, Glenn Parker, and Jill Savage

=== UCLA ===
Team	1	2	3	4	Total
• UCLA	7	17	9	3	36
California	0	14	14	6	34

- Date: October 18
- Location: California Memorial Stadium
- Game start: 3:30
- Referee: Michael Mothershed
- TV announcers (ABC/ESPN2): Bob Wischusen, Matt Millen, and Quint Kessenich

1st quarter scoring: UCLA – Paul Perkins 16-yard pass from Brett Hundley (Ka’imi Fairbairn kick)

2nd quarter scoring: Cal – Daniel Lasco 3-yard run (James Langford kick); UCLA – Fairbairn 38-yard field goal; Cal – Chris Harper 7-yard pass from Luke Rubenzer (Langford kick); UCLA – Jordan James 11-yard run (Fairbairn kick); UCLA – Perkins 49-yard pass from Hundley (Fairbairn kick)

3rd quarter scoring: Cal – Lasco 2-yard run (James Langford kick); UCLA – Fairbairn 24-yard field goal; Cal – Trevor Davis 24-yard pass from Jared Goff (Langford kick); UCLA – Hundley 15-yard run (Hundley pass fail)

4th quarter scoring: Cal – Kenny Lawler 23-yard pass from Goff (Goff run fail); UCLA – Fairbairn 26-yard field goal

=== Oregon ===
Team	1	2	3	4	Total
• Oregon	14	24	14	7	59
California	14	14	7	6	41

- Date: October 24
- Location: Levi's Stadium
- Game start: 10:00
- TV announcers (FS1): Tim Brando, Joel Klatt, and Mike Pereira

=== Oregon State ===
Team	1	2	3	4	Total
• California	3	17	7	18	45
Oregon St	0	10	14	7	31

- Date: November 1
- Location: Reser Stadium
- Game start: 10:30
- TV announcers (Pac12 Network): JB Long, Anthony Herron, and Drea Avent

=== USC ===
Team	1	2	3	4	Total
California	2	7	7	14	30
• USC	21	10	0	7	38

- Date: November 13
- Location: Los Angeles Memorial Coliseum
- Game start: 9:00
- TV announcers (ESPN): Rece Davis, Jesse Palmer, David Pollack, and Samantha Ponder

=== Stanford ===
Team	1	2	3	4	Total
• Stanford	10	14	7	7	38
California	0	7	3	7	17

- Date: November 22
- Location: California Memorial Stadium
- Game start: 4:00
- TV announcers (FS1/FS2): Joe Davis, Joey Harrington, and Kris Budden

=== BYU ===
Team	1	2	3	4	Total
• BYU	14	0	14	14	42
California	7	14	7	7	35

- Date: November 29
- Location: California Memorial Stadium
- Game start: 4:30
- TV announcers (Pac12 Network): Ted Robinson, Glenn Parker, and Jill Savage
