= 2014 Washington State Cougars football team =

American college football season

2014 Washington State Cougars football
- Conference: Pac-12 Conference
- North Division
- Record: 3–9 (2–7 Pac-12)
- Head coach: Mike Leach (3rd season)
- Offensive scheme: Air raid
- Defensive coordinator: Mike Breske (3rd season)
- Base defense: Multiple 3–4
- Home stadium: Martin Stadium

2014 Pac-12 Conference football standings
	Conf.			Overall
Team	W		L	W		L
North Division
No. 2 Oregon xy$^	8	–	1	13	–	2
Stanford	5	–	4	8	–	5
Washington	4	–	5	8	–	6
California	3	–	6	5	–	7
Oregon State	2	–	7	5	–	7
Washington State	2	–	7	3	–	9
South Division
No. 19 Arizona xy	7	–	2	10	–	4
No. 10 UCLA	6	–	3	10	–	3
No. 12 Arizona State	6	–	3	10	–	3
No. 20 USC	6	–	3	9	–	4
No. 21 Utah	5	–	4	9	–	4
Colorado	0	–	9	2	–	10
Championship: Oregon 51, Arizona 13
^ – College Football Playoff participant; $ – Conference champion; x – Division champion/co-champions; y – Championship game participant; Rankings from AP Poll

The 2014 Washington State Cougars football team represented Washington State University during the 2014 NCAA Division I FBS football season. The team was coached by third-year head coach Mike Leach and played their home games at Martin Stadium in Pullman, Washington. They were members of the North Division of the Pac-12 Conference. They finished the season with a 3–9 overall record and a 2–7 mark in conference play to finish in a tie for fifth place in the North Division.

== Schedule ==
Date	Time	Opponent	Site	TV	Result	Attendance
August 28	7:00 pm	vs. Rutgers*	CenturyLink Field; Seattle, WA	FS1	L 38–41	30,927
September 5	7:30 pm	at Nevada*	Mackay Stadium; Reno, NV	ESPN	L 13–24	26,023
September 13	5:00 pm	Portland State*	Martin Stadium; Pullman, WA	P12N	W 59–21	30,874
September 20	7:30 pm	No. 2 Oregon	Martin Stadium; Pullman, WA	ESPN	L 31–38	32,952
September 27	5:00 pm	at Utah	Rice–Eccles Stadium; Salt Lake City, UT	P12N	W 28–27	45,859
October 4	7:30 pm	California^{†}	Martin Stadium; Pullman, WA	P12N	L 59–60	30,020
October 10	6:00 pm	at No. 25 Stanford	Stanford Stadium; Stanford, CA	ESPN	L 17–34	44,135
October 25	3:00 pm	No. 15 Arizona	Martin Stadium; Pullman, WA	P12N	L 37–59	32,952
November 1	1:30 pm	USC	Martin Stadium; Pullman, WA	P12N	L 17–44	25,012
November 8	1:00 pm	at Oregon State	Reser Stadium; Corvallis, OR	P12N	W 39–32	44,377
November 22	10:00 am	at No. 13 Arizona State	Sun Devil Stadium; Tempe, AZ	P12N	L 31–52	51,428
November 29	7:30 pm	Washington	Martin Stadium; Pullman, WA (Apple Cup)	FS1	L 13–31	32,952
*Non-conference game; ^{†}Homecoming; Rankings from AP Poll released prior to the game; All times are in Pacific time

== Game summaries ==
=== Rutgers ===
Rutgers Scarlet Knights at Washington State Cougars – Game summary

Quarter	1	2	3	4	Total
Scarlet Knights	7	14	3	17	41
Cougars	3	14	14	7	38

at CenturyLink Field • Seattle, WA

- Date: Thursday, August 28th, 2014
- Game time: 7:00 pm PST
- Game attendance: 30,927
- TV announcers (Fox Sports 1): Tim Brando, Joel Klatt, Jenny Taft

Game information

First quarter

- RUTG – Leonte Carroo 78 yard pass from Gary Nova (Kyle Federico kick)
- WSU – Erik Powell 22 yard field goal

Second quarter

- RUTG - Paul James 1 yard run (Kyle Federico kick)
- WSU – Isiah Myers 4 yard pass from Connor Halliday (Erik Powell kick)
- RUTG - Paul James 56 yard run (Kyle Federico kick)
- WSU - Vince Mayle 26 yard pass from Connor Halliday (Erik Powell kick)

Third quarter

- WSU - River Cracraft 7 yard pass from Connor Halliday (Erik Powell kick)
- RUTG - Kyle Federico 36 yard field goal
- WSU – Isiah Myers 14 yard pass from Connor Halliday (Erik Powell kick)

Fourth quarter

- RUTG - Kyle Federico 36 yard field goal
- RUTG – John Tsimis 29 yard pass from Gary Nova (Kyle Federico kick)
- WSU – Rickey Galvin 5 yard pass from Connor Halliday (Erik Powell kick)
- RUTG - Paul James 3 yard run (Kyle Federico kick)

=== @ Nevada ===
Washington State Cougars at Nevada Wolf Pack – Game summary

Quarter	1	2	3	4	Total
Cougars	0	10	0	3	13
Wolf Pack	7	7	0	10	24

at Mackay Stadium • Reno, NV

- Date: Friday, September 5th, 2014
- Game time: 7:30 pm PST
- Game attendance: 26,023
- TV announcers (ESPN): Mark Neely, Mike Bellotti, Shelley Smith

Game information

First quarter

- NEV – Don Jackson 1 yard run (Brent Zuzo Kick)

Second quarter

- NEV - James Butler 1 yard run (Brent Zuzo Kick)
- WSU – Vince Mayle 13 yard pass from Connor Halliday (Erik Powell Kick)
- WSU - Erik Powell 25 yard field goal

Third quarter
Fourth quarter

- NEV - Don Jackson 2 yard run (Brent Zuzo Kick)
- WSU - Quentin Breshears 38 yard field goal
- NEV - Brent Zuzo 40 yard field goal

=== Portland State ===
Portland State Vikings at Washington State Cougars – Game summary

Quarter	1	2	3	4	Total
Vikings	0	0	14	7	21
Cougars	7	21	7	24	59

at Martin Stadium • Pullman, WA

- Date: Saturday, September 13th, 2014
- Game time: 5:00 pm PST
- Game attendance: 30,874
- TV announcers (Pac-12 Network): Rich Cellini, Mike Pawlawski, Drea Avent

Game information

First quarter

- WSU – Gerard Wicks 1 yard run (Quentin Breshears Kick)

Second quarter

- WSU – River Cracraft 15 yard pass from Connor Halliday (Quentin Breshears Kick)
- WSU - Dom Williams 17 yard pass from Connor Halliday (Quentin Breshears Kick)
- WSU - Vince Mayle 3 yard pass from Connor Halliday (Quentin Breshears Kick)

Third quarter

- PRST - Shaq Richard 6 yard run (Jonathan Gonzales Kick)
- PRST - Alex Toureen 24 yard pass from Kieran McDonagh (Jonathan Gonzales Kick)
- WSU – Isiah Myers 8 yard pass from Connor Halliday (Erik Powell kick)

Fourth quarter

- WSU – Isiah Myers 4 yard pass from Connor Halliday (Erik Powell kick)
- PRST - Patrick Onwuasor 42 yard interception return (Jonathan Gonzales Kick)
- WSU - Quentin Breshears 29 yard field goal
- WSU - Isiah Myers 55 yard pass from Connor Halliday (Quentin Breshears Kick)
- WSU - Dom Williams 84 Yd pass from Luke Falk (Quentin Breshears Kick)

=== Oregon ===
#2 Oregon Ducks at Washington State Cougars – Game summary

Quarter	1	2	3	4	Total
#2 Ducks	7	14	7	10	38
Cougars	14	7	0	10	31

at Martin Stadium • Pullman, WA

- Date: Saturday, September 20th, 2014
- Game time: 7:30 pm PST
- Game attendance: 32,952
- TV announcers (ESPN): Mark Jones, Rod Gilmore, Shelley Smith

Game information

First quarter

- WSU – Dom Williams 18 yard pass from Connor Halliday (Quentin Breshears Kick)
- ORE – Devon Allen 80 Yd pass from Marcus Mariota (Matt Wogan Kick)
- WSU – Dom Williams 8 yard pass from Connor Halliday (Quentin Breshears Kick)

Second quarter

- ORE – Keanon Lowe 57 yard pass from Marcus Mariota (Matt Wogan Kick)
- ORE – Devon Allen 13 yard pass from Marcus Mariota (Matt Wogan Kick)
- WSU – Rickey Galvin 6 yard pass from Connor Halliday (Quentin Breshears Kick)

Third quarter

- ORE – Pharaoh Brown 8 yard pass from Marcus Mariota (Matt Wogan Kick)

Fourth quarter

- WSU – Quentin Breshears 30 yard field goal
- ORE – Matt Wogan 34 Yd field goal
- WSU – River Cracraft 5 yard pass from Connor Halliday (Quentin Breshears Kick)
- ORE – Keanon Lowe 6 yard pass from Marcus Mariota (Matt Wogan Kick)

=== @ Utah ===
Washington State Cougars at Utah Utes – Game summary

Quarter	1	2	3	4	Total
Cougars	0	7	7	14	28
Utes	21	3	0	3	27

at Rice-Eccles Stadium • Salt Lake City, UT

- Date: Saturday, September 27th, 2014
- Game time: 5:00 pm PST
- Game attendance: 45,859
- TV announcers (Pac-12 Network): Ted Robinson, Glenn Parker, Jill Savage

Game information

First quarter

- UTAH – Eric Rowe 11 yard interception return (Andy Phillips Kick)
- UTAH – Kaelin Clay 58 yard punt return (Andy Phillips Kick)
- UTAH – Devontae Booker 76 yard Run (Andy Phillips Kick)

Second quarter

- WSU – Dom Williams 35 yard pass from Connor Halliday (Quentin Breshears Kick)
- UTAH – Andy Phillips 46 yard field goal

Third quarter

- WSU – Vince Mayle 11 yard pass from Connor Halliday (Quentin Breshears Kick)

Fourth quarter

- UTAH – Andy Phillips 43 yard field goal
- WSU – Dom Williams 20 yard pass from Connor Halliday (Quentin Breshears Kick)
- WSU – Vince Mayle 81 yard pass from Connor Halliday (Quentin Breshears Kick)

=== California ===
California Golden Bears at Washington State Cougars (homecoming) – Game summary

Quarter	1	2	3	4	Total
Golden Bears	0	13	28	19	60
Cougars	10	14	28	7	59

at Martin Stadium • Pullman, WA

- Date: Saturday, October 4th, 2014
- Game time: 7:30 pm PST
- TV announcers (Pac-12 Network): Kevin Calabro, Yogi Roth, Lewis Johnson

Game information

First quarter

- WSU - Connor Halliday 90 yard pass to Vince Mayle (Quentin Breshears Kick)
- WSU - Quentin Breshears 42 yard field goal

Second quarter

- CAL - Jared Goff 27 yard pass to Trevor Davis (James Langford Kick)
- WSU - Connor Halliday 16 yard pass Isiah Myers (Quentin Breshears Kick)
- CAL - James Langford 31 yard field goal
- WSU - Connor Halliday 17 yard pass to River Cracraft (Quentin Breshears Kick)
- CAL - James Langford 26 yard field goal

Third quarter

- CAL - Jared Goff 27 yard pass to Daniel Lasco (James Langford Kick)
- CAL - Daniel Lasco 15 yard run (James Langford Kick)
- WSU - Connor Halliday 86 yard pass to River Cracraft(Quentin Breshears Kick)
- WSU - Gerald Wicks 1 yard run (Quentin Breshears Kick)
- CAL - Trevor Davis 100 yard kickoff return (James Langford Kick)
- WSU - C. Halliday 9 yard pass to Isiah Myers (Quentin Breshears Kick)
- CAL - Trevor Davis 98 yard kickoff return (James Langford Kick)
- WSU - Connor Halliday 9 yard pass to River Cracraft (Quentin Breshears Kick)

Fourth quarter

- CAL - Jared Goff 5 yard pass to Bryce Treggs (James Langford Kick)
- CAL - Jared Goff 21 yard pass to Bryce Treggs (James Langford Blocked)
- WSU - Gerald Wicks 1 yard run (Quentin Breshears Kick)
- CAL - Jared Goff 51 yard pass to Trevor Davis (2 PT failed)

Top passers

- CAL – Jared Goff - 37/53, 527 yards, 5 TDs, 0 int
- WSU – Connor Halliday - 49/70, 734 yards, 6 TDs, 0 int

Top rushers

- CAL – Daniel Lasco - 11 carries, 61 yards, 1 TD
- WSU – Gerald Wicks - 12 carries, 38 yards, 2 TDs

Top receiving

- CAL – Bryce Treggs - 10 catches, 120 yards, 2 TDs
- WSU – Vince Mayle - 11 catches, 263 yards, 1 TD

Top Defense

- CAL –
- WSU –

=== @ Stanford ===
Washington State Cougars at Stanford Cardinal – Game summary

Quarter	1	2	3	4	Total
Cougars	7	0	3	7	17
#25 Cardinal	10	7	7	10	34

at Stanford Stadium • Stanford, CA

- Date: Friday, October 10th, 2014
- Game time: 6:00 pm PST
- TV announcers (ESPN): Dave Flemming, Danny Kanell, Allison Williams

Game information

First quarter

- STAN - Jordan Williamson 22 yard field goal
- STAN - Kevin Hogan 39 yard pass to Eric Cotton (Jordan Williamson kick)
- WSU - Connor Halliday 9 yard pass to Vince Mayle (Quentin Breshears kick)

Second quarter

- STAN - Kevin Hogan 3 yard pass to Greg Taboada (Jordan Williamson kick)

Third quarter

- WSU - Quentin Breshears 46 yard field goal
- STAN - Kevin Hogan 4 yard pass to Greg Taboada (Jordan Williamson kick)

Fourth quarter

- WSU - Connor Halliday 3 yard pass to River Cracraft (Quentin Breshears kick)
- STAN - Jordan Williamson 34 yard field goal
- STAN - Remound Wright 6 yard run (Jordan Williamson kick)

Top passers

- WSU – Connor Halliday - 44/71, 303 yards, 2 TDs, 1 int
- STAN - Kevin Hogan - 23/35, 284 yards, 3 TDs, 0 int

Top rushers

- WSU – Jamal Morrow - 3 carries, 10 yards, 0 TD
- STAN - Remound Wright - 14 carries, 98 yards, 1 TD

Top receiving

- WSU – River Cracraft - 15 catches, 99 yards, 1 TD
- STAN - Ty Montgomery - 7 catches, 72 yards, 0 TD

Top Defense

- WSU –
- STAN -

=== Arizona ===
Arizona Wildcats at Washington State Cougars – Game summary

Quarter	1	2	3	4	Total
#15 Wildcats	24	7	21	7	59
Cougars	0	16	0	21	37

at Martin Stadium • Pullman, WA

- Date: Saturday, October 25th, 2014
- Game time: 3:00 p.m.
- TV announcers (Pac-12 Network): Ted Robinson, Glenn Parker, Jill Savage

Game information

First quarter
Second quarter
Third quarter
Fourth quarter

=== USC ===
USC Trojans at Washington State Cougars – Game summary

Quarter	1	2	3	4	Total
Trojans	14	10	13	7	44
Cougars	0	7	3	7	17

at Martin Stadium • Pullman, WA

- Date: Saturday, November 1st, 2014
- Game time: 4:30
- TV announcers (Pac-12 Network): Kevin Calabro, Glenn Parker, Jill Savage

Game information

First quarter
Second quarter
Third quarter
Fourth quarter

=== @ Oregon State ===
Washington State Cougars at Oregon State Beavers– Game summary

Quarter	1	2	3	4	Total
Cougars	7	14	3	15	39
Beavers	10	6	6	10	32

at Reser Stadium • Corvallis, OR

- Date: Saturday, November 8th, 2014
- Game time: 1:00 p.m. PST
- TV announcers (Pac-12 Network): Roxy Bernstein, Yogi Roth, Lewis Johnson

Game information

First quarter

- ORST - Sean Mannion 14 yards pass to Connor Hamlett (Garrett Owens kick)
- ORST - Garrett Owens 24 yard field goal
- WSU - Luke Falk 5 yard pass to Isiah Myers (Quentin Breshears kick)

Second quarter

- WSU - Luke Falk 21 yards pass to Tyler Baker (Quentin Breshears kick)
- ORST - Garrett Owens 37 yard field goal
- WSU - Luke Falk 48 yards pass to Vince Mayle (Quentin Breshears kick)
- ORST - Garrett Owens 44 yard field goal

Third quarter

- WSU - Quentin Breshears 32 yard field goal
- ORST - Terron Ward 1 yard run (Two-point conversion failed)

Fourth quarter

- ORST - Garrett Owens 46 yard field goal
- WSU - Luke Falk 18 yard pass to Dom Williams (Luke Falk pass to Ricky Galvin for two-point conversion)
- WSU - Luke Falk 9 yard pass to Robert Lewis (Quentin Breshears kick)
- ORST - Terron Ward 1 yard run (Garrett Owens kick)

Top passers

- WSU – Luke Falk - 44/61, 471 yards, 5 TDs, 0 int
- ORST - Sean Mannion - 31/41, 419 yards, 1 TD, 0 int

Top rushers

- WSU – Jamal Morrow - 9 carries, 46 yards
- ORST - Terron Ward - 11 carries, 49 yards, 2 TDs

Top receiving

- WSU – Vince Mayle - 6 catches, 143 yards, 1 TD
- ORST - Victor Bolden - 10 catches, 126 yards

Top Defense

- ORST –
- WSU –

=== @ Arizona State ===
Washington State Cougars at Arizona State Sun Devils – Game summary

Quarter	1	2	3	4	Total
Cougars	7	17	0	7	31
#13 Sun Devils	0	21	7	24	52

at Sun Devil Stadium • Tempe, AZ

- Date: Saturday, November 22nd, 2014
- Game time: 10:00 am
- TV announcers (Pac-12 Network): Kevin Calabro, Yogi Roth, Lewis Johnson

Game information

First quarter

Second quarter
Third quarter
Fourth quarter

=== Washington ===
Washington Huskies at Washington State Cougars (107th Apple Cup) – Game summary

Quarter	1	2	3	4	Total
Huskies	7	7	10	7	31
Cougars	0	0	0	13	13

at Martin Stadium • Pullman, WA

- Date: Saturday, November 29th, 2014
- Game time: 7:30 p.m.
- TV announcers (Fox Sports 1): Joe Davis, Joey Harrington, Kris Budden

Game information

First quarter
Second quarter
Third quarter
Fourth quarter

== Statistics ==
=== Team ===
Team Statistics
	Washington State	Opponents
Points	245	245
Points per game	35.0	35.0
Points off turnovers	55	109
First Downs	187	149
Rushing	26	56
Passing	143	78
Penalty	18	15
Rushing Yards	313	1,141
Rushing attempts	133	265
Average Per rush	2.4	4.3
Average per game	44.7	163.0
Rushing TDs	3	10
Passing Yards	3,430	1,965
Comp–Att	294–440	158–252
Comp %	66.8	62.7
Average Per pass	7.8	7.8
Average per catch	11.7	12.4
Average per game	490.0	280.7
Passing TDs	29	16
Interceptions	8	2
Total offense	3,743	3,106
Total play	573	517
Average per play	6.5	6.0
Average per game	534.7	443.7
Kick returns: # – yards	28 – 573	34 – 785
Punt returns: # – yards	19 – 150	13 – 176
INT Returns: # – yards	2 – 9	8 – 106
Fumbles – fumbles lost	6 – 4	5 – 3
Penalties – yards	57 – 509	58 – 495
Penalties per game – yards per game	8.1 – 72.7	8.3 – 70.7
Punts – average	28 – 41.7	38 – 42.6
Time of possession per game	30:20	29:40
3rd–down conversions	47/107 - 44%	41/106 - 39%
4th–down conversions	10/21 - 48%	7/12 - 58%

Score by Quarter
	1st	2nd	3rd	4th	TOTAL
Cougars	41	73	59	72	245
Opponents	52	58	59	76	245
