= 2014 Arizona Wildcats football team =

American college football season

2014 Arizona Wildcats football

Pac-12 South Division champion

Pac-12 Championship Game, L 13–51 vs. Oregon

Fiesta Bowl, L 30–38 vs. Boise State
- Conference: Pac-12 Conference
- South Division

Ranking
- Coaches: No. 17
- AP: No. 19
- Record: 10–4 (7–2 Pac-12)
- Head coach: Rich Rodriguez (3rd season)
- Co-offensive coordinators: Calvin Magee (3rd season); Rod Smith (3rd season)
- Offensive scheme: Spread option
- Defensive coordinator: Jeff Casteel (3rd season)
- Base defense: 3–3–5
- MVP: Scooby Wright III
- Captain: 13: Dan Pettinato (DL); Terris Jones-Grigsby (RB); Hank Hobson (LB); Fabbians Ebbele (OL); Jonathan McKnight (CB); Jared Tevis (S)
- Home stadium: Arizona Stadium

Uniform
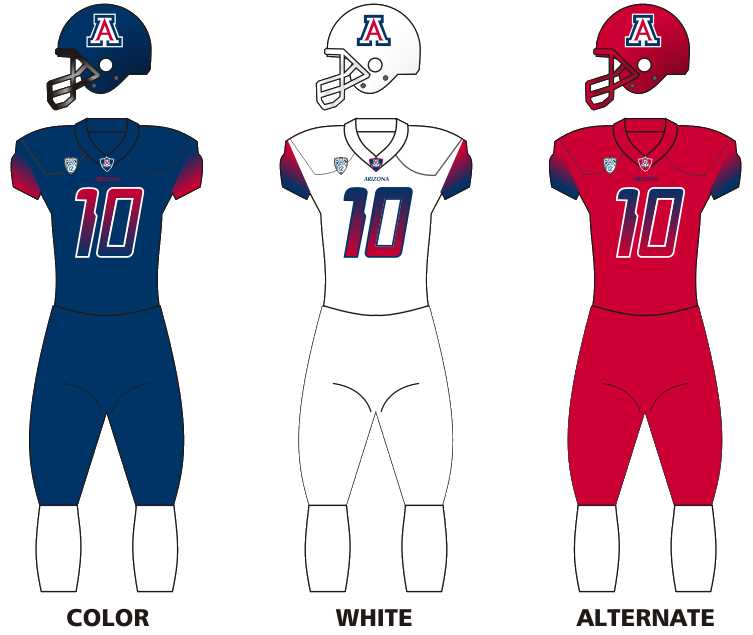

2014 Pac-12 Conference football standings
	Conf.			Overall
Team	W		L	W		L
North Division
No. 2 Oregon xy$^	8	–	1	13	–	2
Stanford	5	–	4	8	–	5
Washington	4	–	5	8	–	6
California	3	–	6	5	–	7
Oregon State	2	–	7	5	–	7
Washington State	2	–	7	3	–	9
South Division
No. 19 Arizona xy	7	–	2	10	–	4
No. 10 UCLA	6	–	3	10	–	3
No. 12 Arizona State	6	–	3	10	–	3
No. 20 USC	6	–	3	9	–	4
No. 21 Utah	5	–	4	9	–	4
Colorado	0	–	9	2	–	10
Championship: Oregon 51, Arizona 13
^ – College Football Playoff participant; $ – Conference champion; x – Division champion/co-champions; y – Championship game participant; Rankings from AP Poll

The 2014 Arizona Wildcats football team represented the University of Arizona in the 2014 NCAA Division I FBS football season. The season was the Wildcats's 115th overall, 37th as a member of the Pac-12 Conference (Pac-12) and its fourth within the Pac-12 South Division. The team was led by head coach Rich Rodriguez, in his third year, and played its home games at Arizona Stadium in Tucson, Arizona for the 86th straight year.

They ultimately finished 10–4, achieving the third 10-win regular season in program history. The Wildcats won the Pac-12 South Division for the first time, advancing to the Pac-12 Football Championship Game at Levi's Stadium in Santa Clara, California, where they faced the Oregon Ducks. The Wildcats played in the first year of the New Year's Six bowls, netting a berth in the 2014 Fiesta Bowl, the school's third major-bowl appearance, where they faced the Boise State Broncos. Arizona lost the game to Boise State, 38–30.

== Departures ==
Name	Number	Pos.	Height	Weight	Year	Hometown	Notes
Javelle Allen	9	Quarterback	6'2"	223	RS freshman	Prosper, TX	dismissed from team.
Eric Bender-Ramsay	69	Offensive guard	6'6"	331	Senior	Carson, CA	Graduated.
Kylan Butler	2	Running back	5'7"	187	Senior	Antioch, CA	Graduated.
Ka'Deem Carey	25	Running back	5'10"	207	Junior	Tucson, AZ	Forwent Senior season to enter in the 2014 NFL draft.
Wayne Capers Jr.	12	Safety	6'1"	201	Sophomore	Pittsburgh, PA	left team due to injuries.
Brian Chacon	63	Long snapper	6'3"	251	Senior	Cypress, CA	Graduated.
B.J. Denker	7	Quarterback	6'3"	184	Senior	Torrance, CA	Graduated.
Jake Fischer	33	Linebacker	6'0"	222	Senior	Tucson, AZ	Graduated.
Marquis Flowers	2	Linebacker	6'3"	229	Senior	Phoenix, AZ	Graduated.
Tevin Hood	98	Defensive Tackle	6'0"	302	Senior	Chandler, AZ	Graduated.
Nick Isham	14	Quarterback	5'10"	185	Junior	Hidden Hills, CA	Transferred.
Daniel Jenkins	3	Running back	5'9"	195	Senior	Moreno Valley, CA	Graduated.
Terrence Miller	18	Receiver	6'4"	233	Senior	Moreno Valley, CA	Graduated.
Richard Morrison	8	Cornerback	5'11"	184	Senior	Royse City, TX	Graduated.
Chris Putton	62	Offensive guard	6'4"	284	Senior	Glendale, AZ	Graduated.
Derrick Rainey	17	Cornerback	6'1"	185	Senior	Houston, TX	Graduated.
Shaquille Richardson	5	Cornerback	6'1"	188	Senior	Carson, CA	Graduated.
Justin Samuels	29	Cornerback	5'10"	171	Senior	Camas, WA	Graduated.
Jake Smith	86	Kicker	6'2"	201	Senior	Philadelphia, PA	Graduated.
Sione Tuihalamaka	91	Defensive end	6'2"	269	Senior	Hawthorne, CA	Graduated.
Justin Washington	43	Defensive end	6'2"	244	Senior	Cypress, TX	Graduated.
Shane Wilson	42	Cornerback	5'10"	171	Senior	Woodland Hills, CA	Graduated.

== Before the season ==
=== Top returning players ===
Offense

Player	Class	Position
Anu Solomon	RS freshman	Quarterback
Jesse Scroggins	RS senior	Quarterback
Terris Jones-Grigsby	RS senior	Running back
Nate Phillips	Sophomore	Receiver
Samajie Grant	Sophomore	Receiver
Johnny Jackson	Junior	Receiver
David Richards	Junior	Receiver
Austin Hill	Senior	Receiver
Steven Gurrola	Senior	Center
Fabbians Ebbele	Senior	Offensive line
Mickey Baucus	Senior	Offensive line
Cayman Bundage	Junior	Offensive line

Defense

Player	Class	Position
Jonathan McKnight	Senior	Cornerback
Devin Holiday	Sophomore	Cornerback
Jourdon Grandon	Senior	Safety
Jared Tevis	Senior	Safety
Tra'Mayne Bondurant	Senior	Safety
William Parks	Junior	Safety
Scooby Wright III	Sophomore	Linebacker
Sir Thomas Jackson	Junior	Linebacker
Hank Hobson	Senior	Linebacker
Reggie Gilbert	Senior	Defensive lineman
Dan Pettinato	Senior	Defensive lineman
Dwight Melvin	Sophomore	Defensive lineman

Special teams

Player	Class	Position
Drew Riggleman	Junior	Punter
Casey Skowron	Junior	Kicker

=== Arrivals ===
Name	Number	Pos.	Height	Weight	Year	Hometown	Notes
Jerrard Randall	8	Quarterback	6'1"	186	Junior (Junior College)	Hollywood, FL	transferred from Northeast Mississippi Community College. Randall also played at LSU along with Jordan Allen, before Junior College.
Jordan Allen	18	Defensive end	6'6"	254	Senior	West Monroe, LA	transfer from LSU. Previously played with Jerrard Randall at LSU. Will have eligibility to play in the 2014 season under NCAA transfer rules at Arizona.
Adonis Smith	26	Running back	5'11"	200	Senior	Oakland, CA	transfer from UNLV in last season and Northwestern in last two seasons, will be able to play in the 2014 season.
Ethan Kerysling	34	Placekicker/punter	6'8"	330	Senior	Chapel Hill, N.C.	transfer from Virginia Tech
Freddie Tagaloa	72	Offensive lineman	6'8"	330	Junior (Transfer)	Richmond, CA	transfer from Cal. Will sit out 2014 season under NCAA transfer rules. Will have 2 years eligibility at Arizona.
Niko Kittrell	86	Defensive lineman	6'1"	186	Sophomore	Tucson, AZ	transferred from San Jose State.
Blair Tushaus	87	Tight end	6'1"	186	Senior	Scottsdale, AZ	transferred from BYU.
Aiulua Fanene	98	Defensive lineman	6'4"	295	RS sophomore	Nuʻuuli, AS	rejoins the team after returning from his mission.

=== Spring football ===
On April 12, 2014, Arizona capped off its spring football camp with a scrimmage at Arizona Stadium which was open to the public.

2014 Arizona Wildcats Football Spring Game – Game summary

Quarter	1	2	3	4	Total
Navy Blue (Defense)	14	7	7	10	38
White (Offense)	7	21	21	8	57

at Arizona Stadium • Tucson, AZ

- Date: April 12, 2014
- Game time: 1:00 pm PST
- Game weather: Temperature: • Wind: • Weather:
- TV: Pac-12 Network

Game information

First quarter
Second quarter
Third quarter
Fourth quarter

Top passers
Top rushers
Top receiving
Top tackler

=== Recruiting class ===
College recruiting (2014)
Name	Hometown	School	Height	Weight	40^{‡}	Commit date
Marquis Ware; ATH	Los Angeles, CA	Salesian High School	6 ft 2 in (1.88 m)	210 lb (95 kg)	4.6	Aug 21, 2013
Marquis Ware; ATH	Recruit ratings: Scout: Rivals: 247Sports: ESPN:					
Cameron Denson; ATH	Tucson, AZ	Salpointe Catholic High School	6 ft 1 in (1.85 m)	175 lb (79 kg)	-	Jan 12, 2013
Cameron Denson; ATH	Recruit ratings: Scout: Rivals: 247Sports: ESPN:					
Jamardre Cobb; OLB	Los Angeles, CA	Salesian High School	6 ft 0 in (1.83 m)	229 lb (104 kg)	4.7	Aug 21, 2013
Jamardre Cobb; OLB	Recruit ratings: Scout: Rivals: 247Sports: ESPN:					
Jordan Poland; OT	La Jolla, CA	La Jolla Country Day School	6 ft 7 in (2.01 m)	333 lb (151 kg)	–	Jan 2, 2014
Jordan Poland; OT	Recruit ratings: Scout: Rivals: 247Sports: ESPN:					
Nick Wilson; RB	Fresno, CA	Central High School (Fresno, California)	6 ft 0 in (1.83 m)	191 lb (87 kg)	–	Mar 12, 2013
Nick Wilson; RB	Recruit ratings: Scout: Rivals: 247Sports: ESPN:					
Jonathan Haden; RB	Washington, D.C.	Friendship Collegiate Academy Public Charter School	5 ft 8 in (1.73 m)	185 lb (84 kg)	-	May 24, 2013
Jonathan Haden; RB	Recruit ratings: Scout: Rivals: 247Sports: ESPN:					
Brandon Dawkins; QB	Westlake Village, CA	Oaks Christian High School	6 ft 4 in (1.93 m)	199 lb (90 kg)	-	Jul 27, 2013
Brandon Dawkins; QB	Recruit ratings: Scout: Rivals: 247Sports: ESPN:					
T.J. Johnson; ATH	Cape Coral, Florida	Island Coast High School	5 ft 8 in (1.73 m)	170 lb (77 kg)	–	Jan 1, 2013
T.J. Johnson; ATH	Recruit ratings: Scout: Rivals: 247Sports: ESPN:					
Trevor Wood; TE	Scottsdale, AZ	Chaparral High School	6 ft 6 in (1.98 m)	240 lb (110 kg)	-	Jul 27, 2013
Trevor Wood; TE	Recruit ratings: Scout: Rivals: 247Sports: ESPN:					
Jerrard Randall; QB	Hollywood, FL	Northeast Mississippi Community College/LSU (JC)	6 ft 1 in (1.85 m)	190 lb (86 kg)	-	Dec 15, 2013
Jerrard Randall; QB	Recruit ratings: Scout: Rivals: 247Sports: ESPN:					
Tony Ellison; ATH	Granite Bay, CA	Granite Bay High School	5 ft 11 in (1.80 m)	162 lb (73 kg)	-	Jun 23, 2013
Tony Ellison; ATH	Recruit ratings: Scout: Rivals: 247Sports: ESPN:					
Rodney Carr; ATH	Los Angeles, CA	Salesian High School	6 ft 0 in (1.83 m)	190 lb (86 kg)	–	Jun 23, 2013
Rodney Carr; ATH	Recruit ratings: Scout: Rivals: 247Sports: ESPN:					
Kaelin Deboskie; WR	Tucson, AZ	Salpointe Catholic High School	5 ft 9 in (1.75 m)	155 lb (70 kg)	4.45	Oct 20, 2013
Kaelin Deboskie; WR	Recruit ratings: Scout: Rivals: 247Sports: ESPN:					
Josh Pollack; P/K	Highland Park, IL	Highland Park High School	5 ft 11 in (1.80 m)	175 lb (79 kg)	-	Jun 25, 2013
Josh Pollack; P/K	Recruit ratings: Scout: Rivals: 247Sports: ESPN:					
Marcus Griffin; DT	Bellevue, WA	Bellevue High School	6 ft 2 in (1.88 m)	299 lb (136 kg)	4.6	Feb 5, 2014
Marcus Griffin; DT	Recruit ratings: Scout: Rivals: 247Sports: ESPN:					
Levi Walton; OT	Cape Coral, FL	Ida S. Baker High School	6 ft 4 in (1.93 m)	260 lb (120 kg)	-	Oct 20, 2013
Levi Walton; OT	Recruit ratings: Scout: Rivals: 247Sports: ESPN:					
Kwesi Mashack; CB	Norco, CA	Norco High School	5 ft 9 in (1.75 m)	182 lb (83 kg)	–	Jul 27, 2013
Kwesi Mashack; CB	Recruit ratings: Scout: Rivals: 247Sports: ESPN:					
Layth Friekh; OT	Peoria, AZ	Centennial High School	6 ft 6 in (1.98 m)	251 lb (114 kg)	4.98	Oct 21, 2013
Layth Friekh; OT	Recruit ratings: Scout: Rivals: 247Sports: ESPN:					
Antonio Smothers; ILB	Scottsdale, AZ	Scottsdale Community College	6 ft 2 in (1.88 m)	240 lb (110 kg)	4.7	Aug 1, 2013
Antonio Smothers; ILB	Recruit ratings: Scout: Rivals: 247Sports: ESPN:					
Jeff Worthy; DT	Santa Ana, CA	Santa Ana College	6 ft 3 in (1.91 m)	290 lb (130 kg)	-	Aug 3, 2013
Jeff Worthy; DT	Recruit ratings: Scout: Rivals: 247Sports: ESPN:					
Overall recruit ranking: Scout: 15 Rivals: 21 247Sports: 31 ESPN: 15
‡ Refers to 40-yard dash; Note: In many cases, Scout, Rivals, 247Sports, On3, and ESPN may conflict in their listings of height, weight and 40 time.; In these cases, the average was taken. ESPN grades are on a 100-point scale.; Sources: "Arizona Signee List 2014". Rivals.; "Scout.com Football Recruiting: Arizona". Scout.; "2014 Player Signees- Arizona". ESPN.; "Scout.com Team Recruiting Rankings". Scout.; "2014 Team Ranking". Rivals.com.

=== Preseason awards watchlists ===
==== Overall awards ====
Offensive

Maxwell Award – College Football Player of the Year *Austin Hill

Walter Camp Award – Player of the Year *Austin Hill

Biletnikoff Award – College Football Player of the Year *Austin Hill

==== Defensive awards ====
Defensive

Bronko Nagurski Trophy – Most Outstanding Defensive Player *Jared Tevis

== Regular season ==
=== Schedule ===
Date	Time	Opponent	Rank	Site	TV	Result	Attendance
August 29	7:30 p.m.	UNLV*		Arizona Stadium; Tucson, AZ	ESPN	W 58–13	50,103
September 4	5:00 p.m.	at UTSA*		Alamodome; San Antonio, TX	FS1	W 26–23	33,472
September 13	8:04 p.m.	Nevada*		Arizona Stadium; Tucson, AZ	P12N	W 35–28	48,504
September 20	7:00 p.m.	California		Arizona Stadium; Tucson, AZ	P12N	W 49–45	45,595
October 2	7:30 p.m.	at No. 2 Oregon		Autzen Stadium; Eugene, OR	ESPN	W 31–24	56,032
October 11	7:30 p.m.	USC	No. 10	Arizona Stadium; Tucson, AZ	ESPN2	L 26–28	56,754
October 25	3:00 p.m.	at Washington State	No. 15	Martin Stadium; Pullman, WA	P12N	W 59–37	32,952
November 1	7:30 p.m.	at No. 22 UCLA	No. 12	Rose Bowl; Pasadena, CA	ESPN	L 7–17	80,246
November 8	6:00 p.m.	Colorado^{†}	No. 19	Arizona Stadium; Tucson, AZ	P12N	W 38–20	50,177
November 15	1:30 p.m.	Washington	No. 14	Arizona Stadium; Tucson, AZ	FOX	W 27–26	47,757
November 22	1:30 p.m.	at No. 17 Utah	No. 15	Rice-Eccles Stadium; Salt Lake City, UT	ESPN	W 42–10	45,824
November 28	1:30 p.m.	No. 13 Arizona State	No. 11	Arizona Stadium; Tucson, AZ (Territorial Cup)	FOX	W 42–35	56,083
December 5	7:00 p.m.	vs. No. 2 Oregon*	No. 7	Levi's Stadium; Santa Clara, CA (Pac-12 Championship Game)	FOX	L 13–51	45,618
December 31	2:00 p.m.	vs. No. 20 Boise State*	No. 10	University of Phoenix Stadium; Glendale, AZ (Fiesta Bowl)	ESPN	L 30–38	66,896
*Non-conference game; ^{†}Homecoming; Rankings from AP Poll and CFP Rankings after October 28 released prior to game; All times are in Mountain time

=== Personnel ===
==== Roster ====
2014 Arizona Wildcats football team roster
Players
Coaches
Offense

Pos.	#	Name	Class
WR	1	Cayleb Jones	So
WR	2	Tyrell Johnson	Fr
WR	4	David Richards	Jr
WR	5	Trey Griffey	So
WR	6	Nate Phillips	So
RB	7	Jonathan Haden	Fr
QB	8	Jerrard Randall	Jr
WR	9	Kaelin DeBoskie	Fr
WR/KR	10	Samajie Grant	So
QB	11	Conner Brewer	So
QB	12	Anu Solomon (C)	Fr
QB	13	Brandon Dawkins	Fr
QB	14	Zach Werlinger	Fr
QB	15	Jesse Scroggins	Sr
TE	17	Josh Kern	So
WR/PR	19	DaVonte' Neal	So
RB	21	Ty Cruz	Fr
RB/KR	23	Jared Baker	Jr
RB	24	Terris Jones-Grigsby (C)	Sr
WR	25	Spencer Marciniak	Fr
RB	26	Adonis Smith	Sr
RB	28	Nick Wilson	Fr
WR	29	Austin Hill (C)	Sr
WR/PR	30	Johnny Jackson	Jr
WR	31	Darius Aguirre	Fr
RB	34	Zach Green	Fr
RB	35	Omar Boyd	Fr
RB	36	Jocquez Kalili	Fr
WR	39	Tony Ellison	Fr
TE	42	Alexi Oro	Fr
RB	43	Jonah Huff	Fr
OL	55	Levi Walton	Fr
OL	56	Steven Gurrola (C)	Sr
OL	58	Layth Friekh	Fr
OL	61	Cayman Bundage	Jr
OL	62	Aiulua Fanene	So
OL	64	Faitele Faafoi	Jr
OL	65	Zach Hemmila	So
OL	66	Carter Wood	Jr
OL	67	Gerhard de Beer	Fr
OL	68	Mickey Baucus (C)	Sr
OL	69	Christian Boettcher	Fr
OL	70	T.D. Gross	So
OL	71	Jordan Poland	Fr
OL	73	Fabbians Ebbele	Sr
OL	75	Kaige Lawrence	Jr
OL	77	Lene Maiava	Jr
OL	78	Jacob Alsadek	Fr
WR	84	Abraham Mendivil	Fr
WR	85	Drake Pierre	Fr
TE	86	Hunter Layton	Fr
TE	87	Blair Tushaus	Sr
TE	88	Trevor Wood	Fr

Defense

Pos.	#	Name	Class
S	1	Tellas Jones	So
LB	2	Marquis Ware	Fr
CB	3	Cam Denson	Fr
LB	4	Antonio Smothers	Jr
LB	5	Jamardre Cobb	Fr
CB	6	Jonathan McKnight	Sr
FS	7	David Price	Fr
S	11	William Parks	Jr
S	12	Rodney Carr Jr.	Fr
CB	13	Devin Holiday	So
S	14	Yamen Sanders	So
CB	15	Kwesi Mashack	Fr
CB	17	Demetric Woodard Jr	Fr
S	20	Trevor Ermisch	Sr
S	21	Tra'Mayne Bondurant	Sr
FS	26	Jourdon Grandon	Sr
FS	27	Jamar Allah	Jr
S	28	Anthony Lopez	Jr
CB	29	Jarvis McCall Jr.	Fr
LB	30	Brandon Rutt	Fr
LB	32	DeAndre' Miller	So
LB	33	Scooby Wright III	So
S	37	Carter Hehr	Fr
S	38	Jared Tevis	Sr
CB	40	Brendan Murphy	Sr
LB	45	Derrick Turituri	So
S	46	Blake Brady (C)	Sr
LB	47	Jake Matthews	So
LB	48	Elijah Marshall	Fr
LB	49	Haden Gregory	Jr
LB	51	Jason Sweet	So
LB	52	Alex King	So
LB	53	Sir Thomas Jackson	Jr
DL	55	Jeff Worthy	Jr
LB	57	Cody Ippolito	So
LB	58	Tre Taylor	Fr
LB	59	Hank Hobson (C)	Sr
DL	60	Luca Bruno	Fr
DL	84	Reggie Gilbert	Sr
LB	88	R.J. Morgan	Fr
DL	89	Hunter Long	Jr
DL	90	Dan Pettinato (C)	Sr
DL	92	Jack Banda	Fr
DL	93	Parker Zellers	Fr
DL	94	Calvin Allen	Fr
DL	96	Marcus Griffin	Fr
DL	97	Dwight Melvin	So
DL	99	Sani Fuimaono	So

Special teams

Pos.	#	Name	Class
K/P	9	Josh Pollack	Fr
P	16	Jake Glatting	Fr
K/P	34	Ethan Keyserling	Sr
P/H	39	Drew Riggleman	Jr
K	41	Casey Skowron	Jr
LS	50	Chase Gorham (C)	Sr
LS	54	Jose Romero	Jr
P	56	Nick Reinhardt	Fr

Head coach

- Rich Rodriguez (3rd season)

Coordinators/assistant coaches

Offense

- Rod Smith – Co-offensive coordinator & quarterbacks (3rd season)
- Jim Michalczik – Running game coordinator & offensive line (2nd season)
- Calvin Magee – Associate head coach, co-offensive coordinator & running backs (3rd season)
- Tony Dews – Associate coach, passing game coordinator & wide receivers (3rd season)
- Charlie Ragle – Special teams coordinator & tight ends (3rd season)
- Kylan Butler – Offensive graduate assistant (1st season)
- Cory Zirbel – Offensive graduate assistant (3rd season)
- Miguel Reveles – Offensive & defensive intern (2nd season)

Defense

- Jeff Casteel – Defensive coordinator & linebackers (3rd season)
- Matt Caponi – Associate coach & safeties (3rd season)
- Bill Kirelawich – Associate coach & defensive line (3rd season)
- Vincent Amey – Assistant strength & conditioning (3rd season)
- Brett Gerch – Assistant strength & conditioning (1st season)
- Ovid Goulbourne – Assistant strength & conditioning (3rd season)
- Chris Allen – Associate athletic director, director of strength & conditioning (3rd season)
- Miek DiAngelo – Defensive graduate assistant (2nd season)
- Casey Vance – Defensive graduate assistant (1st season)

Legend

- (C) Team captain
- (S) Suspended
- (I) Ineligible
- Injured
- Redshirt

2014 Arizona Wildcats roster Roster
Last update: 11:12, 22 November 2014 (UTC)

==== Depth chart ====
Defense

S
Jourdon Grandon (26)
Jamar Allah (27)
⋅

FS
William Parks (11)
Tellas Jones (1)
⋅

WLB	MLB	SLB
Jake Matthews (47); DeAndre' Miller (32)	Scooby Wright III (33)	Cody Ippolito (57); Derrick Turituri (45)
⋅	Hank Hobson (59)	⋅
⋅	⋅	⋅

BANDIT
Jared Tevis (38)
Blake Brady (46)
⋅

CB
Jonathan McKnight (6)
Cam Denson (3)
⋅

DE	NT	DE
Reggie Gilbert (84)	Jeff Worthy (55)	Dan Pettinato (90)
Calvin Allen (94)	Parker Zellers (93)	Aiulua Fanene (98); Calvin Allen (94)
⋅	⋅	⋅

CB
Jarvis McCall Jr. (29)
Devin Holiday (13)
⋅

Offense

WR
Cayleb Jones (1)
Trey Griffey (5)
⋅

SLOT
DaVonte' Neal (19)
Nate Phillips (6)
⋅

LT	LG	C	RG	RT
Mickey Baucus (68)	Cayman Bundage (61)	Steven Gurrola (56)	Jacob Alsadek (78); Lene Maiava (77)	Fabbians Ebbele (73)
Layth Fairkh (58)	Zach Hemmila (65)	Carter Wood (66)	⋅	T.D. Gross (70)
⋅	⋅	⋅	⋅	⋅

WR
Samaje Grant (10)
Jonathan Haden (7)
⋅

WR
Austin Hill (29)
David Richards (4)
⋅

QB
Anu Solomon (12)
Jesse Scroggins (15)
Jerrard Randall (8)
Connor Brewer (11)

RB
Terris Jones-Grigsby (24)
Nick Wilson (28)
Jared Baker (23)

Special teams
PK Casey Skowron (41)
PK Josh Pollack (9)
P Drew Riggleman (39)
P Ethan Keyserling (34)
KR Samajie Grant (10)
Jared Baker (23)
PR DaVonte' Neal (19)
LS Chase Gorham (50)
H Drew Riggleman (39)

On April 12, 2014, the Wildcats will play the White and Navy Blue game, the program's annual spring game. Arizona plays seven of twelve regular season games at home: two of three non-conference games and five of nine in Pac-12 play. For the second-straight year the Cats face neither Stanford nor Oregon State.

== Game summaries ==
=== vs UNLV ===
UNLV Rebels (0–0) vs Arizona Wildcats (0–0) – Game summary

Quarter	1	2	3	4	Total
Rebels	0	6	7	0	13
Wildcats	14	10	24	10	58

at Arizona Stadium • Tucson, AZ

- Date: August 29, 2014
- Game time: 7:30 p.m.
- Game weather: Clear, 93 °F (34 °C)
- Game attendance: 50,103
- Referee: Cooper Castleberry
- TV announcers (ESPN): Mark Neely (play-by-play), Mike Bellotti (analyst), Dawn Davenport (sideline reporter)

Game information

First quarter

- (1:40) ARIZ – Nate Phillips 39-yard pass from Anu Solomon, Casey Skowron kick (Drive: 3 plays, 96 yards, 0:38; Arizona 7–0)
- (0:13) ARIZ – Samajie Grant 63-yard pass from Anu Solomon, Casey Skowron kick (Drive: 3 plays, 66 yards, 0:40; Arizona 14–0)

Second quarter

- (12:22) UNLV – Jonathan Leiva 41-yard field goal (Drive: 6 plays, 51 yards, 2:51; Arizona 14–3)
- (5:52) ARIZ – Casey Skowron 28-yard field goal (Drive: 11 plays, 67 yards, 2:51; Arizona 17–3)
- (3:08) UNLV – Nicolai Bornand 48-yard field goal (Drive: 7 plays, 44 yards, 2:44; Arizona 17–6)
- (0:50) ARIZ – DaVonte' Neal 13-yard pass from Anu Solomon, Casey Skowron kick (Drive: 8 plays, 65 yards, 2:18; Arizona 24–6)

Third quarter

- (14:40) ARIZ – Austin Hill 92-yard pass from Anu Solomon, Casey Skowron kick (Drive: 1 play, 92 yards, 0:14; Arizona 31–6)
- (12:14) UNLV – Anthony Williams 2-yard pass from Blake Decker, Jonathan Leiva kick (Drive: 6 plays, 75 yards, 2:26; Arizona 31–13)
- (8:48) ARIZ – Terris Jones-Grigsby 2-yard run, Casey Skowron kick (Drive: 11 plays, 75 yards, 3:26; Arizona 38–13)
- (2:36) ARIZ – Casey Skowron 49-yard field goal (Drive: 9 plays, 24 yards, 2:54; Arizona 41–13)
- (0:43) ARIZ – Nick Wilson 85-yard run, Casey Skowron kick (Drive: 1 play, 85 yards, 0:13; Arizona 48–13)

Fourth quarter

- (12:38) ARIZ – Casey Skowron 39-yard field goal (Drive: 7 plays, 21 yards, 2:07; Arizona 51–13)
- (1:18) ARIZ – Connor Brewer 3-yard run, Casey Skowron kick (Drive: 19 plays, 77 yards, 9:18; Arizona 58–13)

Statistics	UNLV	ARIZ
First downs	20	32
Total yards	371	787
Rushing yards	31–119	48–353
Passing yards	252	434
Passing: Comp–Att–Int	22–41–1	26–46–0
Time of possession	28:24	31:36

Team	Category	Player	Statistics
UNLV	Passing	Blake Decker	22/41, 252 yards, TD, INT
UNLV	Rushing	Blake Decker	10 carries, 56 yards
UNLV	Receiving	Devonte Boyd	6 receptions, 102 yards
Arizona	Passing	Anu Solomon	25/44, 425 yards, 4 TD
Arizona	Rushing	Terris Jones-Grigsby	13 carries, 124 yards, TD
Arizona	Receiving	Austin Hill	3 receptions, 110 yards, TD

=== at UTSA ===
Arizona Wildcats (1–0) at UTSA Roadrunners (1–0) – Game summary

Quarter	1	2	3	4	Total
Wildcats	10	10	6	0	26
Roadrunners	7	9	0	7	23

at Alamodome • San Antonio, TX

- Date: September 4, 2014
- Game time: 5:00 p.m.
- Game weather: None (Indoor stadium)
- Game attendance: 33,472
- Referee: Steve Barth
- TV announcers (FS1): Tim Brando (play by play), Joel Klatt (analyst)

Game information

First quarter

- (14:42) ARIZ – Cayleb Jones 85-yard pass from Anu Solomon, Casey Skowron kick (Drive: 1 play, 85 yards, 0:18; Arizona 7–0)
- (11:05) ARIZ – Casey Skowron 38-yard field goal (Drive: 7 plays, 38 yards, 2:10; Arizona 10–0)
- (0:55) UTSA – David Morgan II 10-yard pass from Tucker Carter, Sean Ianno kick (Drive: 11 plays, 85 yards, 5:01; Arizona 10–7)

Second quarter

- (12:11) ARIZ – Casey Skowron 23-yard field goal (Drive: 12 plays, 69 yards, 3:44; Arizona 13–7)
- (8:47) UTSA – Kam Jones 18-yard run, Sean Ianno kick (Drive: 9 plays, 79 yards, 3:24; UTSA 14–13)
- (4:43) UTSA – Team safety (UTSA 16–13)
- (0:26) ARIZ – Nick Wilson 2-yard run, Casey Skowron kick (Drive: 9 plays, 85 yards, 2:42; Arizona 20–16)

Third quarter

- (8:31) ARIZ – Casey Skowron 44-yard field goal (Drive: 11 plays, 57 yards, 3:50; Arizona 23–16)
- (4:12) ARIZ – Casey Skowron 28-yard field goal (Drive: 10 plays, 38 yards, 2:31; Arizona 26–16)

Fourth quarter

- (7:32) UTSA – David Glasco II 3-yard run, Sean Ianno kick (Drive: 8 plays, 80 yards, 3:05; Arizona 26–23)

Statistics	ARIZ	UTSA
First downs	22	23
Total yards	454	349
Rushing yards	44–223	39–121
Passing yards	231	228
Passing: Comp–Att–Int	17–32–0	22–33–1
Time of possession	26:56	33:04

Team	Category	Player	Statistics
Arizona	Passing	Anu Solomon	17/32, 231 yards, TD
Arizona	Rushing	Nick Wilson	30 carries, 174 yards, TD
Arizona	Receiving	Cayleb Jones	4 receptions, 143 yards, TD
UTSA	Passing	Tucker Carter	22/33, 228 yards, TD, INT
UTSA	Rushing	David Glasco II	12 carries, 35 yards, TD
UTSA	Receiving	David Morgan II	5 receptions, 76 yards, TD

=== vs Nevada ===
Nevada Wolf Pack (2–0) vs Arizona Wildcats (2–0) – Game summary

Quarter	1	2	3	4	Total
Wolf Pack	3	10	8	7	28
Wildcats	7	14	7	7	35

at Arizona Stadium • Tucson, AZ

- Date: September 13, 2014
- Game time: 8:00 p.m.
- Game weather: Partly cloudy, 84 °F (29 °C)
- Game attendance: 48,504
- Referee: Michael Mothershed
- TV announcers (Pac-12 Network): Kevin Calabro (play-by-play), Yogi Roth (analyst), Lewis Johnson (sideline reporter)

Game information

First quarter

- (5:34) NEV – Brent Zuzo 22-yard field goal (Drive: 19 plays, 70 yards, 9:26; Nevada 3–0)
- (1:50) ARIZ – Nick Wilson 2-yard run, Casey Skowron kick (Drive: 12 plays, 86 yards, 3:37; Arizona 7–3)

Second quarter

- (10:42) NEV – Brent Zuzo 21-yard field goal (Drive: 13 plays, 71 yards, 6:08; Arizona 7–6)
- (5:04) ARIZ – Nick Wilson 28-yard run, Casey Skowron kick (Drive: 8 plays, 76 yards, 2:40; Arizona 14–6)
- (2:08) ARIZ – Tyrell Johnson 35-yard pass from Anu Solomon, Casey Skowron kick (Drive: 5 plays, 65 yards, 1:12; Arizona 21–6)
- (0:08) NEV – Jarred Gipson 7-yard pass from Cody Fajardo, Brent Zuzo kick (Drive: 8 plays, 75 yards, 2:00; Arizona 21–13)

Third quarter

- (6:03) NEV – Hasaan Henderson 6-yard pass from Cody Fajardo, Don Jackson run for two-point conversion (Drive: 16 plays, 84 yards, 7:13; Tied 21–21)
- (3:34) ARIZ – Cayleb Jones 22-yard pass from Anu Solomon, Casey Skowron kick (Drive: 7 plays, 75 yards, 2:24; Arizona 28–21)

Fourth quarter

- (14:55) ARIZ – Cayleb Jones 24-yard pass from Anu Solomon, Casey Skowron kick (Drive: 5 plays, 51 yards, 1:35; Arizona 35–21)
- (6:01) NEV – Jarred Gipson 6-yard pass from Cody Fajardo, Brent Zuzo kick (Drive: 8 plays, 74 yards, 3:10; Arizona 35–28)

Statistics	NEV	ARIZ
First downs	25	26
Total yards	429	507
Rushing yards	40–108	38–229
Passing yards	321	278
Passing: Comp–Att–Int	29–39–0	22–26–1
Time of possession	35:48	24:12

Team	Category	Player	Statistics
Nevada	Passing	Cody Fajardo	29/39, 321 yards, 3 TD
Nevada	Rushing	James Butler	13 carries, 50 yards
Nevada	Receiving	Richy Turner	7 receptions, 99 yards
Arizona	Passing	Anu Solomon	22/26, 278 yards, 3 TD, INT
Arizona	Rushing	Nick Wilson	29 carries, 171 yards, 2 TD
Arizona	Receiving	Cayleb Jones	9 receptions, 116 yards, 2 TD

=== vs California ===
California Golden Bears (2–0) vs Arizona Wildcats (3–0) – Game summary

Quarter	1	2	3	4	Total
Golden Bears	14	14	3	14	45
Wildcats	0	6	7	36	49

at Arizona Stadium • Tucson, AZ

- Date: September 20, 2014
- Game time: 7:00 p.m.
- Game weather: Partly cloudy, 83 °F (28 °C)
- Game attendance: 45,595
- Referee: Terry Leyden
- TV announcers (Pac-12 Network): Roxy Bernstein (play by play), Glenn Parker (analyst), Jill Savage (sideline reporter)

Game information

First quarter

- (14:17) CAL – Daniel Lasco 44-yard run, James Langford kick (Drive: 3 plays, 75 yards, 0:43; California 7–0)
- (11:53) CAL – Bryce Treggs 80-yard pass from Jared Goff, James Langford kick (Drive: 1 play, 80 yards, 0:13; California 14–0)

Second quarter

- (10:39) ARIZ – Casey Skowron 39-yard field goal (Drive: 7 plays, 39 yards, 2:18; California 14–3)
- (8:55) CAL – Stephen Anderson 26-yard pass from Jared Goff, James Langford kick (Drive: 5 plays, 75 yards, 1:44; California 21–3)
- (5:28) ARIZ – Casey Skowron 28-yard field goal (Drive: 13 plays, 65 yards, 3:27; California 21–6)
- (3:43) CAL – Chris Harper 30-yard pass from Jared Goff, James Langford kick (Drive: 4 plays, 75 yards, 1:45; California 28–6)

Third quarter

- (11:02) ARIZ – Cayleb Jones 41-yard pass from Anu Solomon, Casey Skowron kick (Drive: 8 plays, 96 yards, 1:54; California 28–13)
- (8:28) CAL – James Langford 45-yard field goal (Drive: 9 plays, 48 yards, 2:34; California 31–13)

Fourth quarter

- (14:46) ARIZ – Casey Skowron 31-yard field goal (Drive: 7 plays, 39 yards, 2:04; California 31–16)
- (13:36) ARIZ – Austin Hill 9-yard pass from Anu Solomon, Casey Skowron kick (Drive: 2 plays, 17 yards, 0:32; California 31–23)
- (10:56) CAL – Khalfani Muhammad 50-yard run, James Langford kick (Drive: 6 plays, 75 yards, 2:40; California 38–23)
- (8:09) ARIZ – Cayleb Jones 16-yard pass from Anu Solomon, Casey Skowron kick (Drive: 9 plays, 75 yards, 2:47; California 38–30)
- (5:21) CAL – Khalfani Muhammad 6-yard run, James Langford kick (Drive: 6 plays, 75 yards, 2:48; California 45–30)
- (3:30) ARIZ – Terris Jones-Grigsby 6-yard run, Casey Skowron kick (Drive: 8 plays, 75 yards, 1:51; California 45–37)
- (2:44) ARIZ – Cayleb Jones 15-yard pass from Anu Solomon, two-point pass failed (Drive: 4 plays, 41 yards, 0:43; California 45–43)
- (0:00) ARIZ – Austin Hill 47-yard pass from Anu Solomon (Drive: 6 plays, 70 yards, 0:52; Arizona 49–45)

Statistics	CAL	ARIZ
First downs	24	36
Total yards	573	627
Rushing yards	42–193	32–107
Passing yards	380	520
Passing: Comp–Att–Int	18–30–1	47–74–2
Time of possession	28:52	31:08

Team	Category	Player	Statistics
California	Passing	Jared Goff	18/30, 380 yards, 3 TD, INT
California	Rushing	Daniel Lasco	20 carries, 123 yards, TD
California	Receiving	Bryce Treggs	5 receptions, 119 yards, TD
Arizona	Passing	Anu Solomon	47/73, 520 yards, 5 TD, 2 INT
Arizona	Rushing	Anu Solomon	16 carries, 46 yards
Arizona	Receiving	Cayleb Jones	13 receptions, 186 yards, 3 TD

=== at No. 2 Oregon ===
Arizona Wildcats (4–0) at No. 2 Oregon Ducks (4–0) – Game summary

Quarter	1	2	3	4	Total
Wildcats	3	0	21	7	31
No. 2 Ducks	0	7	7	10	24

at Autzen Stadium • Eugene, OR

- Date: October 2, 2014
- Game time: 7:30 p.m.
- Game weather: Mostly clear, 65 °F (18 °C)
- Game attendance: 50,024
- Referee: Chris Coyte
- TV announcers (ESPN): Rece Davis (play by play), Jesse Palmer (analyst), David Pollack (analyst), Samantha Ponder (sideline reporter)

Game information

First quarter

- (8:27) ARIZ – Casey Skowron 28-yard field goal (Drive: 11 plays, 58 yards, 3:05; Arizona 3–0)

Second quarter

- (14:37) ORE – Marcus Mariota 26-yard pass from Royce Freeman, Matt Wogan kick (Drive: 8 plays, 75 yards, 2:45; Oregon 7–3)

Third quarter

- (12:52) ARIZ – Nick Wilson 3-yard run, Casey Skowron kick (Drive: 6 plays, 80 yards, 2:08; Arizona 10–7)
- (9:58) ORE – Devon Allen 6-yard pass from Marcus Mariota, Matt Wogan kick (Drive: 10 plays, 72 yards, 2:54; Oregon 14–10)
- (6:27) ARIZ – Nick Wilson 2-yard run, Casey Skowron kick (Drive: 9 plays, 93 yards, 3:31; Arizona 17–14)
- (1:33) ARIZ – Nick Wilson 34-yard pass from Anu Solomon, Casey Skowron kick (Drive: 8 plays, 80 yards, 3:13; Arizona 24–14)

Fourth quarter

- (13:26) ORE – Matt Wogan 21-yard field goal (Drive: 8 plays, 72 yards, 3:07; Arizona 24–17)
- (8:21) ORE – Keanon Lowe 9-yard pass from Marcus Mariota, Matt Wogan kick (Drive: 9 plays, 66 yards, 2:37; Tied 24–24)
- (2:54) ARIZ – Terris Jones-Grigsby 1-yard run, Casey Skowron kick (Drive: 15 plays, 71 yards, 5:27; Arizona 31–24)

Statistics	ARIZ	ORE
First downs	29	25
Total yards	495	446
Rushing yards	55–208	41–144
Passing yards	287	302
Passing: Comp–Att–Int	20–31–1	21–33–0
Time of possession	33:32	26:28

Team	Category	Player	Statistics
Arizona	Passing	Anu Solomon	20/31, 287 yards, TD, INT
Arizona	Rushing	Terris Jones-Grigsby	27 carries, 115 yards, TD
Arizona	Receiving	Terris Jones-Grigsby	4 receptions, 95 yards
Oregon	Passing	Marcus Mariota	20/32, 276 yards, 2 TD
Oregon	Rushing	Royce Freeman	19 carries, 85 yards
Oregon	Receiving	Devon Allen	5 receptions, 78 yards, TD

=== vs USC ===
USC Trojans (3–2) vs No. 10 Arizona Wildcats (5–0) – Game summary

Quarter	1	2	3	4	Total
Trojans	7	7	14	0	28
No. 10 Wildcats	6	0	7	13	26

at Arizona Stadium • Tucson, AZ

- Date: October 11, 2014
- Game time: 7:30 p.m.
- Game weather: Clear, 78 °F (26 °C)
- Game attendance: 56,754
- Referee: Land Clark
- TV announcers (ESPN2): Dave Pasch (play by play), Brian Griese (analyst), Tom Luginbill (sideline reporter)

Game information

First quarter

- (8:21) ARIZ – Casey Skowron 32-yard field goal (Drive: 6 plays, 21 yards, 2:04; Arizona 3–0)
- (6:03) USC – Javorius Allen 34-yard run, Alex Wood kick (Drive: 5 plays, 66 yards, 2:10; USC 7–3)
- (0:42) ARIZ – Casey Skowron 25-yard field goal (Drive: 16 plays, 68 yards, 5:21; USC 7–6)

Second quarter

- (10:30) USC – Javorius Allen 48-yard run, Alex Wood kick (Drive: 3 plays, 62 yards, 0:43; USC 14–6)

Third quarter

- (9:17) USC – Nelson Agholor 21-yard pass from Cody Kessler, Alex Wood kick (Drive: 11 plays, 75 yards, 5:43; USC 21–6)
- (6:05) ARIZ – Jared Baker 6-yard run, Casey Skowron kick (Drive: 4 plays, 22 yards, 1:10; USC 21–13)
- (0:35) USC – Javorius Allen 1-yard run, Alex Wood kick (Drive: 13 plays, 75 yards, 5:30; USC 28–13)

Fourth quarter

- (10:19) ARIZ – Jared Baker 41-yard pass from Anu Solomon, Casey Skowron kick (Drive: 9 plays, 85 yards, 2:55; USC 28–20)
- (1:07) ARIZ – Jared Baker 1-yard run, two-point run failed (Drive: 15 plays, 80 yards, 2:20; USC 28–26)

Statistics	USC	ARIZ
First downs	22	34
Total yards	424	472
Rushing yards	39–239	29–77
Passing yards	185	395
Passing: Comp–Att–Int	20–30–1	43–72–0
Time of possession	31:10	28:50

Team	Category	Player	Statistics
USC	Passing	Cody Kessler	20/30, 185 yards, TD, INT
USC	Rushing	Javorius Allen	26 carries, 205 yards, 3 TD
USC	Receiving	Nelson Agholor	7 receptions, 81 yards, TD
Arizona	Passing	Anu Solomon	43/72, 395 yards, TD
Arizona	Rushing	Jared Baker	12 carries, 43 yards, 2 TD
Arizona	Receiving	Austin Hill	7 receptions, 70 yards

=== at Washington State ===
No. 15 Arizona Wildcats (5–1) at Washington State Cougars (2–5) – Game summary

Quarter	1	2	3	4	Total
No. 15 Wildcats	24	7	21	7	59
Cougars	0	16	0	21	37

at Martin Stadium • Pullman, WA

- Date: October 25, 2014
- Game time: 3:00 p.m.
- Game weather: Mostly clear, 65 °F (18 °C)
- Game attendance: 32,952
- Referee: Terry Leyden
- TV announcers (Pac-12 Network): Ted Robinson (play by play), Glenn Parker (analyst), Jill Savage (sideline reporter)

Game information

First quarter

- (13:54) ARIZ – DaVonte' Neal 81-yard punt return, Casey Skowron kick (Arizona 7–0)
- (8:28) ARIZ – Casey Skowron 31-yard field goal (Drive: 13 plays, 84 yards, 3:58; Arizona 10–0)
- (3:55) ARIZ – DaVonte' Neal 2-yard pass from Anu Solomon, Casey Skowron kick (Drive: 10 plays, 80 yards, 2:42; Arizona 17–0)
- (1:11) ARIZ – Nate Phillips 21-yard pass from Anu Solomon, Casey Skowron kick (Drive: 5 plays, 34 yards, 1:10; Arizona 24–0)

Second quarter

- (8:56) ARIZ – Cayleb Jones 3-yard pass from Anu Solomon, Casey Skowron kick (Drive: 12 plays, 68 yards, 3:58; Arizona 31–0)
- (6:36) WSU – Isiah Myers 37-yard pass from Connor Halliday, Quentin Breshears kick (Drive: 7 plays, 60 yards, 2:13; Arizona 31–7)
- (1:51) WSU – Isiah Myers 18-yard pass from Connor Halliday, kick failed (Drive: 9 plays, 90 yards, 3:26; Arizona 31–13)
- (0:19) WSU – Quentin Breshears 40-yard field goal (Drive: 4 plays, -6 yards, 1:22; Arizona 31–16)

Third quarter

- (13:37) ARIZ – Nick Wilson 2-yard run, Casey Skowron kick (Drive: 6 plays, 61 yards, 1:13; Arizona 38–16)
- (10:12) ARIZ – Austin Hill 14-yard pass from Anu Solomon, Casey Skowron kick (Drive: 7 plays, 77 yards, 2:06; Arizona 45–16)
- (1:06) ARIZ – Trey Griffey 13-yard pass from Anu Solomon, Casey Skowron kick (Drive: 6 plays, 54 yards, 2:14; Arizona 52–16)

Fourth quarter

- (11:26) WSU – Gerard Wicks 1-yard run, Quentin Breshears kick (Drive: 12 plays, 75 yards, 4:40; Arizona 52–23)
- (6:15) WSU – Vince Mayle 8-yard pass from Connor Halliday, Quentin Breshears kick (Drive: 11 plays, 80 yards, 2:58; Arizona 52–30)
- (6:09) ARIZ – Cayleb Jones 44-yard kickoff return, Casey Skowron kick (Arizona 59–30)
- (0:16) WSU – Tyler Baker 8-yard pass from Connor Halliday, Quentin Breshears kick (Drive: 7 plays, 65 yards, 1:39; Arizona 59–37)

Statistics	ARIZ	WSU
First downs	25	33
Total yards	451	543
Rushing yards	36–157	20–54
Passing yards	294	489
Passing: Comp–Att–Int	26–38–0	56–79–2
Time of possession	25:36	34:24

Team	Category	Player	Statistics
Arizona	Passing	Anu Solomon	26/38, 294 yards, 5 TD
Arizona	Rushing	Terris Jones-Grigsby	13 carries, 107 yards
Arizona	Receiving	Cayleb Jones	7 receptions, 78 yards, TD
Washington State	Passing	Connor Halliday	56/79, 489 yards, 4 TD, 2 INT
Washington State	Rushing	Jamal Morrow	6 carries, 48 yards
Washington State	Receiving	Vince Mayle	14 receptions, 145 yards, TD

=== at No. 22 UCLA ===
No. 12 Arizona Wildcats (6–1) at No. 22 UCLA Bruins (6–2) – Game summary

Quarter	1	2	3	4	Total
No. 12 Wildcats	7	0	0	0	7
No. 22 Bruins	0	3	14	0	17

at Rose Bowl • Pasadena, CA

- Date: November 1, 2014
- Game time: 7:30 p.m.
- Game weather: Partly Cloudy, 55 °F (13 °C)
- Game attendance: 80,246
- Referee: Chris Coyte
- TV announcers (Pac-12 Network): Mark Jones (play-by-play), Rod Gilmore (analyst), Jessica Mendoza (sideline reporter)

Game information

First quarter

- (12:29) ARIZ – Cayleb Jones 14-yard pass from Anu Solomon, Casey Skowron kick (Drive: 12 plays, 75 yards, 2:31; Arizona 7–0)

Second quarter

- (12:17) UCLA – Ka'imi Fairbairn 24-yard field goal (Drive: 14 plays, 78 yards, 6:16; Arizona 7–3)

Third quarter

- (5:34) UCLA – Paul Perkins 5-yard run, Ka'imi Fairbairn kick (Drive: 12 plays, 58 yards, 4:42; UCLA 10–7)
- (4:44) UCLA – Jordan Payton 70-yard pass from Brett Hundley, Ka'imi Fairbairn kick (Drive: 1 play, 70 yards, 0:10; UCLA 17–7)

Fourth quarter

- No scoring plays

Statistics	ARIZ	UCLA
First downs	19	21
Total yards	255	460
Rushing yards	31–80	59–271
Passing yards	175	189
Passing: Comp–Att–Int	18–48–1	19–26–0
Time of possession	21:51	38:09

Team	Category	Player	Statistics
Arizona	Passing	Anu Solomon	18/48, 175 yards, TD, INT
Arizona	Rushing	Terris Jones-Grigsby	11 carries, 50 yards
Arizona	Receiving	Trey Griffey	4 receptions, 48 yards
UCLA	Passing	Brett Hundley	19/26, 189 yards, TD
UCLA	Rushing	Brett Hundley	24 carries, 131 yards
UCLA	Receiving	Jordan Payton	6 receptions, 119 yards, TD

=== vs Colorado ===
Colorado Buffaloes (2–7) vs No. 19 Arizona Wildcats (6–2) – Game summary

Quarter	1	2	3	4	Total
Buffaloes	7	10	3	0	20
No. 19 Wildcats	7	14	3	14	38

at Arizona Stadium • Tucson, AZ

- Date: November 8, 2014
- Game time: 6:00 p.m.
- Game weather: Clear, 75 °F (24 °C)
- Game attendance: 50,177
- Referee: Michael Batlan
- TV announcers (Pac-12 Network): Kevin Calabro (play by play), Glenn Parker (analyst), Jill Savage (sideline reporter)

Game information

First quarter

- (14:49) COLO – Shay Fields 75-yard pass from Sefo Liufau, Will Oliver kick (Drive: 1 play, 75 yards, 0:11; Colorado 7–0)
- (1:12) ARIZ – Tra'Mayne Bondurant 22-yard fumble return, Casey Skowron kick (Tied 7–7)

Second quarter

- (12:16) ARIZ – Tyrell Johnson 8-yard pass from Anu Solomon, Casey Skowron kick (Drive: 5 plays, 31 yards, 1:47; Arizona 14–7)
- (10:19) COLO – Sefo Liufau 7-yard pass from Nelson Spruce, Will Oliver kick (Drive: 6 plays, 75 yards, 1:57; Tied 14–14)
- (4:09) COLO – Will Oliver 19-yard field goal (Drive: 13 plays, 59 yards, 5:28; Colorado 17–14)
- (0:11) ARIZ – David Richards 1-yard pass from Anu Solomon, Casey Skowron kick (Drive: 8 plays, 55 yards, 1:56; Arizona 21–17)

Third quarter

- (12:48) ARIZ – Casey Skowron 37-yard field goal (Drive: 8 plays, 55 yards, 2:12; Arizona 24–17)
- (7:35) COLO – Will Oliver 33-yard field goal (Drive: 11 plays, 60 yards, 5:13; Arizona 24–20)

Fourth quarter

- (9:50) ARIZ – Samajie Grant 27-yard pass from Anu Solomon, Casey Skowron kick (Drive: 3 plays, 31 yards, 1:26; Arizona 31–20)
- (5:49) ARIZ – Samajie Grant 20-yard pass from Anu Solomon, Casey Skowron kick (Drive: 6 plays, 60 yards, 1:54; Arizona 38–20)

Statistics	COLO	ARIZ
First downs	19	28
Total yards	353	499
Rushing yards	36–94	47–288
Passing yards	259	211
Passing: Comp–Att–Int	25–39–2	21–38–0
Time of possession	30:05	29:55

Team	Category	Player	Statistics
Colorado	Passing	Sefo Liufau	24/33, 252 yards, TD, 2 INT
Colorado	Rushing	Phillip Lindsay	17 carries, 114 yards
Colorado	Receiving	Shay Fields	5 receptions, 94 yards, TD
Arizona	Passing	Anu Solomon	21/38, 211 yards, 4 TD
Arizona	Rushing	Nick Wilson	21 carries, 153 yards
Arizona	Receiving	Samajie Grant	6 receptions, 83 yards, 2 TD

=== vs Washington ===
Washington Huskies (6–4) vs No. 14 Arizona Wildcats (7–2) – Game summary

Quarter	1	2	3	4	Total
Huskies	7	10	9	0	26
No. 14 Wildcats	7	14	0	6	27

at Arizona Stadium • Tucson, AZ

- Date: November 15, 2014
- Game time: 1:30 p.m.
- Game weather: Clear, 70 °F (21 °C)
- Game attendance: 47,757
- Referee: Jack Folliard
- TV announcers (Fox): Gus Johnson (play-by-play), Charles Davis (analyst), Molly McGrath (sideline reporter)

Game information

First quarter

- (8:32) ARIZ – Nick Wilson 2-yard run, Casey Skowron kick (Drive: 5 plays, 74 yards, 1:08; Arizona 7–0)
- (6:36) WASH – Joshua Perkins 36-yard pass from Marvin Hall, Cameron Van Winkle kick (Drive: 6 plays, 75 yards, 1:56; Tied 7–7)

Second quarter

- (9:27) WASH – Cameron Van Winkle 39-yard field goal (Drive: 9 plays, 38 yards, 3:42; Washington 10–7)
- (5:16) WASH – Dwayne Washington 66-yard run, Cameron Van Winkle kick (Drive: 8 plays, 90 yards, 3:12; Washington 17–7)
- (1:39) ARIZ – Casey Skowron 18-yard run, Casey Skowron kick (Drive: 13 plays, 75 yards, 3:37; Washington 17–14)
- (0:08) ARIZ – Nick Wilson 8-yard run, Casey Skowron kick (Drive: 4 plays, 19 yards, 0:25; Arizona 21–17)

Third quarter

- (10:19) WASH – Cameron Van Winkle 31-yard field goal (Drive: 10 plays, 42 yards, 3:40; Arizona 21–20)
- (2:45) WASH – Dwayne Washington 1-yard run, two-point run failed (Drive: 13 plays, 74 yards, 5:16; Washington 26–21)

Fourth quarter

- (13:08) ARIZ – Casey Skowron 35-yard field goal (Drive: 5 plays, 67 yards, 0:57; Washington 26–24)
- (0:00) ARIZ – Casey Skowron 47-yard field goal (Drive: 7 plays, 15 yards, 1:23; Arizona 27–26)

Statistics	WASH	ARIZ
First downs	25	22
Total yards	504	375
Rushing yards	60–245	40–133
Passing yards	259	242
Passing: Comp–Att–Int	21–30–0	17–40–2
Time of possession	36:05	23:55

Team	Category	Player	Statistics
Washington	Passing	Cyler Miles	20/29, 223 yards
Washington	Rushing	Dwayne Washington	19 carries, 148 yards, 2 TD
Washington	Receiving	Jaydon Mickens	4 receptions, 69 yards
Arizona	Passing	Anu Solomon	17/39, 242 yards, 2 INT
Arizona	Rushing	Nick Wilson	30 carries, 104 yards, 2 TD
Arizona	Receiving	Samajie Grant	4 receptions, 85 yards

=== at No. 17 Utah ===
No. 15 Arizona Wildcats (8–2) at No. 17 Utah Utes (7–3) – Game summary

Quarter	1	2	3	4	Total
No. 15 Wildcats	7	7	7	13	34
No. 17 Utes	14	21	3	3	41

at Rice-Eccles Stadium • Salt Lake City, UT

- Date: November 22, 2014
- Game time: 1:30 p.m.
- Game weather: Rain, 47 °F (8 °C)
- Game attendance: 52,435
- Referee: Terry Leyden
- TV announcers (ESPN): Mark Jones (play by play), Rod Gilmore (analyst), Jessica Mendoza (sideline reporter)

Game information

First quarter

- (3:23) ARIZ – Anu Solomon 11-yard run, Casey Skowron kick (Drive: 7 plays, 86 yards, 2:09; Arizona 7–0)

Second quarter

- (4:12) ARIZ – Nick Wilson 17-yard run, Casey Skowron kick (Drive: 4 plays, 73 yards, 1:27; Arizona 14–0)
- (1:17) ARIZ – Dan Pettinato 31-yard fumble return, Casey Skowron kick (Arizona 21–0)
- (0:07) UTAH – Westlee Tonga 11-yard pass from Travis Wilson, Andy Phillips kick (Drive: 8 plays, 75 yards, 1:10; Arizona 21–7)

Third quarter

- (5:14) UTAH – Andy Phillips 28-yard field goal (Drive: 8 plays, 76 yards, 3:28; Arizona 21–10)

Fourth quarter

- (11:50) ARIZ – Nick Wilson 75-yard run, Casey Skowron kick (Drive: 5 plays, 95 yards, 2:18; Arizona 28–10)
- (10:40) ARIZ – Nick Wilson 19-yard run, Casey Skowron kick (Drive: 1 play, 19 yards, 0:06; Arizona 35–10)
- (9:58) ARIZ – Tra'Mayne Bondurant 39-yard interception return, Casey Skowron kick (Arizona 42–10)

Statistics	ARIZ	UTAH
First downs	21	20
Total yards	520	384
Rushing yards	47–298	43–213
Passing yards	222	171
Passing: Comp–Att–Int	11–22–0	18–35–3
Time of possession	27:32	32:28

Team	Category	Player	Statistics
Arizona	Passing	Anu Solomon	8/17, 158 yards
Arizona	Rushing	Nick Wilson	20 carries, 218 yards, 3 TD
Arizona	Receiving	Samajie Grant	4 receptions, 88 yards
Utah	Passing	Travis Wilson	16/29, 143 yards, TD, 2 INT
Utah	Rushing	Devontae Booker	23 carries, 142 yards
Utah	Receiving	Westlee Tonga	4 receptions, 68 yards, TD

=== vs No. 13 Arizona State ===
No. 13 Arizona State Sun Devils (9–2) vs No. 11 Arizona Wildcats (9–2) – Game summary

Quarter	1	2	3	4	Total
No. 13 Sun Devils	7	14	0	14	35
No. 11 Wildcats	14	7	14	7	42

at Arizona Stadium • Tucson, AZ

- Date: November 28, 2014
- Game time: 1:30 p.m.
- Game weather: Sunny and clear, 80 °F (27 °C)
- Game attendance: 56,083
- Referee: Mark Duddy
- TV announcers (Fox): Tim Brando (play-by-play), Joel Klatt (analyst), Jenny Taft (sideline reporter)

Game information

First quarter

- (14:16) ARIZ – Anthony Lopez 25-yard fumble return, Casey Skowron kick (Arizona 7–0)
- (5:56) ASU – Demetrius Cherry 2-yard fumble return, Zane Gonzalez kick (Tied 7–7)
- (5:01) ARIZ – Samajie Grant 69-yard pass from Anu Solomon, Casey Skowron kick (Drive: 3 plays, 75 yards, 0:55; Arizona 14–7)

Second quarter

- (11:54) ASU – Jaelen Strong 3-yard pass from Taylor Kelly, Zane Gonzalez kick (Drive: 9 plays, 75 yards, 3:13; Tied 14–14)
- (3:41) ARIZ – Nick Wilson 21-yard run, Casey Skowron kick (Drive: 4 plays, 30 yards, 2:05; Arizona 21–14)
- (0:24) ASU – Demario Richard 7-yard pass from Taylor Kelly, Zane Gonzalez kick (Drive: 3 plays, 12 yards, 0:51; Tied 21–21)

Third quarter

- (12:22) ARIZ – Nick Wilson 1-yard run, Casey Skowron kick (Drive: 9 plays, 75 yards, 2:38; Arizona 28–21)
- (9:06) ARIZ – Nick Wilson 72-yard run, Casey Skowron kick (Drive: 1 play, 72 yards, 0:12; Arizona 35–21)

Fourth quarter

- (11:23) ASU – Kody Kohl 2-yard pass from Mike Bercovici, Zane Gonzalez kick (Drive: 6 plays, 65 yards, 2:13; Arizona 35–28)
- (8:31) ARIZ – Samajie Grant 20-yard pass from Anu Solomon, Casey Skowron kick (Drive: 2 plays, 16 yards, 0:42; Arizona 42–28)
- (5:02) ASU – De'Marieya Nelson 9-yard pass from Mike Bercovici, Zane Gonzalez kick (Drive: 8 plays, 78 yards, 3:24; Arizona 42–35)

Statistics	ASU	ARIZ
First downs	27	13
Total yards	380	333
Rushing yards	43–113	37–125
Passing yards	267	208
Passing: Comp–Att–Int	27–44–1	15–21–0
Time of possession	35:54	24:06

Team	Category	Player	Statistics
Arizona State	Passing	Taylor Kelly	13/22, 144 yards, 2 TD
Arizona State	Rushing	Demario Richard	13 carries, 68 yards
Arizona State	Receiving	Jaelen Strong	4 receptions, 80 yards, TD
Arizona	Passing	Anu Solomon	15/21, 208 yards, 2 TD
Arizona	Rushing	Nick Wilson	24 carries, 178 yards, 3 TD
Arizona	Receiving	Samajie Grant	4 receptions, 91 yards, 2 TD

=== vs No. 2 Oregon (Pac-12 Championship Game) ===
No. 7 Arizona Wildcats (10–2) vs No. 2 Oregon Ducks (11–1) – Game summary
(2014 Pac-12 Football Championship Game)

Quarter	1	2	3	4	Total
No. 7 Wildcats	0	0	7	6	13
No. 2 Ducks	6	17	21	7	51

at Levi's Stadium • Santa Clara, CA

- Date: December 5, 2014
- Game time: 7:00 p.m.
- Game weather: Rain, 60 °F (16 °C)
- Game attendance: 45,618
- Referee: Land Clark
- TV announcers (Fox): Tim Brando (play-by-play), Joel Klatt (analyst) & Jenny Taft (sideline)

Game information

First quarter

- (11:30) ORE – Aidan Schneider 34-yard field goal (Drive: 10 plays, 64 yards, 3:39; Oregon 3–0)
- (7:55) ORE – Aidan Schneider 22-yard field goal (Drive: 10 plays, 32 yards, 3:26; Oregon 6–0)

Second quarter

- (7:27) ORE – Marcus Mariota 7-yard run, Aidan Schneider kick (Drive: 5 plays, 39 yards, 1:10; Oregon 13–0)
- (1:34) ORE – Marcus Mariota 4-yard run, Aidan Schneider kick (Drive: 6 plays, 79 yards, 2:21; Oregon 20–0)
- (0:00) ORE – Aidan Schneider 31-yard field goal (Drive: 7 plays, 63 yards, 1:07; Oregon 23–0)

Third quarter

- (10:37) ORE – Devon Allen 4-yard pass from Marcus Mariota, Aidan Schneider kick (Drive: 6 plays, 47 yards, 2:00; Oregon 30–0)
- (9:34) ARIZ – Cayleb Jones 69-yard pass from Jesse Scroggins, Casey Skowron kick (Drive: 2 plays, 70 yards, 0:54; Oregon 30–7)
- (7:59) ORE – Darren Carrington 11-yard pass from Marcus Mariota, Aidan Schneider kick (Drive: 4 plays, 68 yards, 1:24; Oregon 37–7)
- (4:54) ORE – Marcus Mariota 1-yard run, Aidan Schneider kick (Drive: 5 plays, 23 yards, 1:39; Oregon 44–7)

Fourth quarter

- (4:12) ORE – Kenny Bassett 19-yard run, Aidan Schneider kick (Drive: 10 plays, 64 yards, 6:07; Arizona 51–7)
- (0:00) ARIZ – Jerrard Randall 25-yard run (Drive: 1 play, 25 yards, 0:07; Arizona 51–13)

Statistics	ARIZ	ORE
First downs	10	31
Total yards	224	627
Rushing yards	35–111	54–301
Passing yards	113	326
Passing: Comp–Att–Int	9–26–1	27–40–0
Time of possession	21:05	38:55

Team	Category	Player	Statistics
Arizona	Passing	Jesse Scroggins	3/11, 79 yards, TD, INT
Arizona	Rushing	Jerrard Randall	10 carries, 81 yards, TD
Arizona	Receiving	Cayleb Jones	2 receptions, 71 yards, TD
Oregon	Passing	Marcus Mariota	26/45, 361 yards, 2 TD, 3 INT
Oregon	Rushing	Royce Freeman	21 carries, 114 yards
Oregon	Receiving	Darren Carrington	7 receptions, 126 yards, TD

Oregon quarterback Marcus Mariota was named MVP.

=== vs No. 20 Boise State (Fiesta Bowl) ===
No. 20 Boise State Broncos (11–2) vs No. 10 Arizona Wildcats (10–3) – Game summary
(2014 Vizio Fiesta Bowl)

Quarter	1	2	3	4	Total
No. 20 Broncos	21	10	7	0	38
No. 10 Wildcats	7	10	10	3	30

at University of Phoenix Stadium • Glendale, AZ

- Date: December 31, 2014
- Game time: 2:00 p.m.
- Game weather: None (Retractable roof closed)
- Game attendance: 66,896
- Referee: John O'Neill
- TV announcers (ESPN): Sean McDonough (play-by-play), Chris Spielman (analyst) & Todd McShay (sideline)

Game information

First quarter

- (13:18) BSU – Jay Ajayi 56-yard run, Dan Goodale kick (Drive: 4 plays, 78 yards, 1:42; Boise State 7–0)
- (9:17) BSU – Chaz Anderson 57-yard pass from Grant Hedrick, Dan Goodale kick (Drive: 6 plays, 88 yards, 2:30; Boise State 14–0)
- (5:12) BSU – Jay Ajayi 16-yard run, Dan Goodale kick (Drive: 6 plays, 80 yards, 2:11; Boise State 21–0)
- (1:23) ARIZ – Anu Solomon 1-yard run, Casey Skowron kick (Drive: 11 plays, 65 yards, 3:37; Boise State 21–7)

Second quarter

- (11:56) BSU – Jay Ajayi 1-yard run, Dan Goodale kick (Drive: 5 plays, 22 yards, 2:40; Boise State 28–7)
- (8:03) ARIZ – Nick Wilson 1-yard run, Casey Skowron kick (Drive: 13 plays, 83 yards, 3:49; Boise State 28–14)
- (0:30) ARIZ – Casey Skowron 42-yard field goal (Drive: 4 plays, 5 yards, 0:23; Boise State 28–17)
- (0:03) BSU – Dan Goodale 36-yard field goal (Drive: 4 plays, 57 yards, 0:27; Boise State 31–17)

Third quarter

- (9:11) ARIZ – Casey Skowron 24-yard field goal (Drive: 14 plays, 50 yards, 4:18; Boise State 31–20)
- (1:57) BSU – Donte Deayon 16-yard interception return, Dan Goodale kick (Boise State 38–20)
- (0:41) ARIZ – Samajie Grant 51-yard pass from Anu Solomon, Casey Skowron kick (Drive: 5 plays, 75 yards, 1:16; Boise State 38–27)

Fourth quarter

- (6:11) ARIZ – Casey Skowron 32-yard field goal (Drive: 10 plays, 50 yards, 3:06; Boise State 38–30)

Statistics	BSU	ARIZ
First downs	22	29
Total yards	471	492
Rushing yards	34–162	56–157
Passing yards	309	335
Passing: Comp–Att–Int	24–35–1	28–50–2
Time of possession	29:01	30:59

Team	Category	Player	Statistics
Boise State	Passing	Grant Hedrick	24/34, 309 yards, TD, INT
Boise State	Rushing	Jay Ajayi	22 carries, 134 yards, 3 TD
Boise State	Receiving	Thomas Sperbeck	12 receptions, 199 yards
Arizona	Passing	Anu Solomon	28/49, 335 yards, TD, 2 INT
Arizona	Rushing	Nick Wilson	19 carries, 86 yards, TD
Arizona	Receiving	Cayleb Jones	8 receptions, 117 yards

Boise State wide receiver Thomas Sperbeck was named Offensive MVP.

Boise State linebacker Tanner Vallejo was named Defensive MVP.

=== Statistics ===
==== Team ====
Team Statistics
	Arizona	Opponents
Points	440	306
First Downs	307	284
Rushing	110	101
Passing	156	159
Penalty	41	24
Rushing Yards	2,278	1,914
Rushing Attempts	484	493
Average Per Rush	4.7	3.9
Long	85	66
Rushing TDs	23	12
Passing Yards	3,497	3,302
Comp–Att	283/488	298/459
Comp %	58.0	64.9
Average Per Game	291.4	275.2
Average per Attempt	7.2	7.2
Passing TDs	27	25
INT's	7	12
Rating	133.6	138.1
Touchdowns	56	38
Passing	25	21
Rushing	20	12
Defensive	2	0
Interceptions	12	7
Yards	107	40
Long	39	22
Total Offense	5,775	5,216
Total Plays	972	952
Average Per Yards/Game	481.3	434.7
Kick Returns: # – Yards	25/499	33/615
TDs	1	0
Long	44	34
Punts	63	71
Yards	2,904	2,985
Average	46.1	42.0
Punt Returns: # – Yards	16/172	23/192
TDs	1	0
Long	81	34
Fumbles – Fumbles Lost	13/7	28/12
Opposing TD's	3	1
Penalties – Yards	78/759	105/930'
3rd–Down Conversions	79/197 - .401	80/200 - .400
4th–Down Conversions	14/21 - .667	7/17 - .412
Takeaways	24	14
Field Goals	17/25	13/19
Extra Point	53/53	35/36
Sacks	38	28
Sack Against	28	38
Yards	-166	-221

==== Offense ====
Passing Statistics
#	NAME	POS	RAT	CMP	ATT	YDS	CMP%	TD	INT
12	Anu Solomon	QB	134.0	285	491	3,458	58.2	27	7
15	Jesse Scroggins	QB	144.7	7	16	152	43.7	1	1
8	Jerrard Randall	QB	0	0	5	0	0	0	0
	TOTALS		131.2	292	512	3,610	57.8	28	8

Rushing Statistics
#	NAME	POS	CAR	YDS	LONG	TD
28	Nick Wilson	RB	204	1,289	85 (TD)	15
12	Anu Solomon	QB	114	259	38	1
24	Terris Jones-Grigsby	RB	107	528	41	3
23	Jared Baker	RB	25	99	17	2
8	Jerrard Randall	QB	16	97	25	1
15	Jesse Scroggins	QB	9	48	18	0
34	Zach Green	RB	7	19	7	0
2	Tyrell Johnson	WR	3	19	9	0
26	Adonis Smith	RB	3	7	3	0
10	Samajie Grant	WR	2	9	5	0
41	Casey Skowron	K	1	18	18	1
6	Nate Phillips	WR	1	8	8	0
19	Davonte' Neal	WR	1	6	6	0
11	Connor Brewer	QB	1	3	3 (TD)	1
	TOTALS		472	2,298	269	23

Receiving Statistics
#	NAME	POS	REC	YDS	LONG	TD
1	Cayleb Jones	WR	65	902	85 (TD)	9
29	Austin Hill	WR	45	605	92 (TD)	4
10	Samajie Grant	WR	41	649	63 (TD)	5
19	Davonte' Neal	WR	26	207	27	2
5	Trey Griffey	WR	25	339	63	1
6	Nate Phillips	WR	25	272	39 (TD)	2
4	David Richards	WR	23	211	31	1
2	Tyrell Johnson	WR	13	114	35 (TD)	2
28	Nick Wilson	RB	12	92	34	1
24	Terris Jones-Grigsby	RB	11	147	54	0
23	Jared Baker	RB	4	50	41	1
12	Anu Solomon	QB	1	21	21	0
7	Jonathan Haden	RB	1	3	3	0
	TOTALS		283	3,499	575	27

==== Defense ====
Defensive Statistics

Interceptions Statistics
#	NAME	POS	RTNS	YDS	AVG	TD	LNG
26	Jourdon Grandon	S	3	5	1	0	5
21	Tra'Mayne Bondurant	S	2	63	31	1	63
11	William Parks	S	2	14	7	0	14
38	Jared Tevis	S	2	9	4	0	0
13	Devin Holiday	CB	1	16	16	0	16
3	Cam Denson	CB	1	0	0	0	0
6	Jonathan McKnight	CB	1	0	0.0	0	0
	TOTALS		12	107	59	1	98

==== Special teams ====
Kicking statistics
#	NAME	POS	XPM	XPA	XP%	FGM	FGA	FG%	1–19	20–29	30–39	40–49	50+	LNG	PTS
41	Casey Skowron	PK	53	53	100	17	25	68.0	0/0	6/8	8/13	3/4	0/0	49	104
	TOTALS		53	53	100	17	25	68.0	0/0	6/8	8/13	3/4	0/0	49	104

Kick return statistics
#	NAME	POS	RTNS	YDS	AVG	TD	LNG
2	Tyrell Johnson	WR	17	374	22.0	0	38
10	Samajie Grant	WR	3	52	17.3	0	21
23	Jared Baker	WR	2	29	14.0	0	15
1	Cayleb Jones	WR	1	44	44.0	1	44
19	Davonte' Neal	WR	1	0	0.0	0	0
10	Yamen Sanders	S	1	0	0.0	0	0
	TOTALS		25	499	19.4	1	118

Punting statistics
#	NAME	POS	PUNTS	YDS	AVG	LONG	TB	FC	I–20	50+	BLK
39	Drew Riggleman	P	60	0	46.5	70	0	0	0	0	0
12	Anu Solomon	QB	3	0	37.7	48	0	0	0	0	0
	TOTALS		63	0	41.0	118	0	0	0	0	0

Punt return statistics
#	NAME	POS	RTNS	YDS	AVG	TD	LONG
19	Davonte' Neal	WR	11	131	21.7	1	81
6	Nate Phillips	WR	3	32	10.7	0	18
10	Samajie Grant	WR	2	9	4.5	0	5
	TOTALS		16	171	9.2	1	104

==== Scores by quarter (all opponents) ====
	1	2	3	4	Total
Non-conference opponents	10	25	7	7	49
Arizona	31	34	37	17	119

==== Scores by quarter (Pac-12 opponents) ====
	1	2	3	4	Total
Pac-12 opponents	46	105	74	59	284
Arizona	75	62	70	117	324

== Rankings ==
Ranking movements Legend: ██ Increase in ranking ██ Decrease in ranking RV = Received votes
	Week																
Poll	Pre	1	2	3	4	5	6	7	8	9	10	11	12	13	14	15	Final
AP	RV	RV	RV	RV	RV	RV	10	16	15	14	21	17	15	12	8	12	19
Coaches	RV	RV	RV	RV	RV	RV	13	17	15	15	21	18	13	12	8	11	17
CFP	Not released									12	19	14	15	11	7	10	Not released

== Postseason ==
=== Awards ===
==== Pac-12 Conference awards ====
- Defensive Player of the Year

Scooby Wright III

- Coach of the Year

Rich Rodriguez

==== Team awards ====
- Chuck Bednarik Award : Scooby Wright III
- Bronko Nagurski Trophy – Most Outstanding Defensive Player : Scooby Wright III
- Lombardi Award : Scooby Wright III

=== All-American Teams ===
==== All-Americans ====
Scooby Wright III

- SI.com 2014 Midseason All-American Team
- 2014 College Football All American (Associated Press (AP), Football Writers Association of America (FWAA), American Football Coaches Association (AFCA), Walter Camp Foundation (WCFF), The Sporting News (TSN), Sports Illustrated (SI), USA Today (USAT) ESPN, CBS Sports (CBS), College Football News (CFN), Scout.com, and Yahoo! Sports (Yahoo!))

==== Pac-12 All-Conference Team ====
The Wildcats saw 10 of its players honored as members of the 2014 Pac-12 All-Conference team. The first team had one such honoree, while the second team had two. Seven other Cats would land Honorable Mention status.

- First team

Scooby Wright III, LB, So.

- Second team

Steven Gurrola, OL, Sr.
Drew Riggleman, P, Jr.

- Honorable mention

Austin Hill, WR, Sr.
Cayleb Jones, WR, So.
Jonathan McKnight, CB, Sr.
Dan Pettinato, DE, Sr.
Anu Solomon, QB, Fr.
Jared Tevis, S, Sr.
Nick Wilson, RB, Fr.

=== All-Academic Teams ===
==== Pac-12 Conference All-Academic players ====
The Wildcats had six players selected to the Pac-12 Conference All-Academic Team. One player garnered first team honors, while two players landed on the second team, the Wildcats had 3 players granted honorable mention. In order to be eligible for the academic team a player must maintain a minimum 3.0 overall grade-point average and play in at least 50 percent of their team's games.

- First team

Jared Tevis, S, Sr., 3.28 GPA

- Second team

Jared Baker, RB, Jr., 3.30 GPA
Jake Matthews, LB, So., 3.55 GPA

- Honorable mention

Calvin Allen, DE, Fr., 3.23 GPA
Abraham Mendivil, WR, Fr., 3.29 GPA
Casey Skowron, PK, Jr., 3.37 GPA

=== Player of the Week ===
Anu Solomon

- 2x Coaches Offensive Player of the Week
- Manning Award of the Week, Sept. 2nd
- Athlon Sports' National Freshman of the Week
- Davey O'Brien QB of the Week, Sept. 23rd
- Athlon Sports' Pac12 Player of the Week
- Manning Award Star of the Week
- Vegas Seven- Las Vegas Bowl Pac-12 Player of the Week, Sept. 24th
- Maxwell Award Watchlist
- Hard Edge Player of the Week

Cayleb Jones

- Pac-12 Player of the Week, Sept. 22nd
- Coaches Offensive Player of the Week
- Co-CFPA Wide Receivers of the Week
- Earl Campbell Award Week 4 Honorable mention
- Biletnikoff Award Watch List

Terris Jones-Grigsby

- Coaches Offensive Player of the Week

Austin Hill

- Co-CFPA Wide Receivers of the Week

Samajie Grant

- Coaches Offensive Player of the Week

Nate Phillips

- Hard Edge Player of the Week

Nick Wilson

- 4x Coaches Offensive Player of the Week
- Pac-12 Offensive Player of the Week

Steven Gurrola

- Coaches Co-Hard Edge Player of the Week

Parker Zellers

- Coaches Co-Hard Edge Player of the Week

Dan Pettinato

- Coaches Defensive Player of the Week

Jared Tevis

- 2x Coaches Defensive Player of the Week
- 2x Hard Edge Player of the Week

Scooby Wright III

- 3x Pac-12 Defensive Player of the Week
- 5x Coaches Defensive Player of the Week
- Hard Edge Player of the Week
- Athlon Sports' National Defensive Player of the Week
- National Defensive Performer of the Week
- National Linebacker of the Week
- 2x Walter Camp National Defensive Player of the Week
- Bednarik Award watchlist

Davonte' Neal

- Coaches Special Teams Player of the Week

Tyrell Johnson

- Coaches Special Teams Player of the Week

Jourdon Grandon

- Coaches Defensive Player of the Week

Drew Riggleman

- 2x Coaches Special Teams Player of the Week
- Pac-12 Special Teams Player of the Week

Casey Skowron

- 3x Coaches Special Teams Player of the Week
- Lou Groza Award Stars of the Week
- National Specialist of the Week by CFPA, Sept. 8th

== Notes ==
- February 5, 2014 – National Signing Day, first day when high school students can sign a NLI with Arizona.
- November 11, 2014 – All American WR Nate Phillips is done for remainder of the season with broken foot injury.

== Media affiliates ==
=== Radio ===
- ESPN Radio – (ESPN Tucson 1490 AM & 104.09 FM) – Nationwide (Dish Network, Sirius XM, TuneIn radio and iHeartRadio)
- KCUB 1290 AM – Football Radio Show – (Tucson, AZ)
- KHYT – 107.5 FM (Tucson, AZ)
- KTKT 990 AM – La Hora de Los Gatos (Spanish) – (Tucson, AZ)
- KGME 910 AM – (IMG Sports Network) – (Phoenix, AZ)
- KTAN 1420 AM – (Sierra Vista, AZ)
- KDAP 96.5 FM (Douglas, Arizona)
- KWRQ 102.3 FM – (Safford, AZ/Thatcher, AZ)
- KIKO 1340 AM – (Globe, AZ)
- KVWM 970 AM – (Show Low, AZ/Pinetop-Lakeside, AZ)
- XENY 760 – (Nogales, Sonora) (Spanish)

=== TV ===
- KOLD (CBS)
- KGUN (ESPN College Football on ABC/ABC)
- FOX (Fox Sports Media Group)
- FS1 (Fox Sports Media Group)
- ESPN (ESPN Family)
- ESPN2 (ESPN Family)
- ESPNU (ESPN Family)
- CBS Sports Network
- Pac-12 Network (Pac-12 Arizona)
