= 2014 Arizona State Sun Devils football team =

American college football season

2014 Arizona State Sun Devils football

Sun Bowl champion

Sun Bowl, W 36–31 vs. Duke
- Conference: Pac-12 Conference
- South Division

Ranking
- Coaches: No. 14
- AP: No. 12
- Record: 10–3 (6–3 Pac-12)
- Head coach: Todd Graham (3rd season)
- Offensive coordinator: Mike Norvell (3rd season)
- Offensive scheme: Spread
- Defensive coordinator: Keith Patterson (1st season)
- Co-defensive coordinator: Chris Ball (2nd season)
- Base defense: Hybrid Attacking
- Home stadium: Sun Devil Stadium

2014 Pac-12 Conference football standings
	Conf.			Overall
Team	W		L	W		L
North Division
No. 2 Oregon xy$^	8	–	1	13	–	2
Stanford	5	–	4	8	–	5
Washington	4	–	5	8	–	6
California	3	–	6	5	–	7
Oregon State	2	–	7	5	–	7
Washington State	2	–	7	3	–	9
South Division
No. 19 Arizona xy	7	–	2	10	–	4
No. 10 UCLA	6	–	3	10	–	3
No. 12 Arizona State	6	–	3	10	–	3
No. 20 USC	6	–	3	9	–	4
No. 21 Utah	5	–	4	9	–	4
Colorado	0	–	9	2	–	10
Championship: Oregon 51, Arizona 13
^ – College Football Playoff participant; $ – Conference champion; x – Division champion/co-champions; y – Championship game participant; Rankings from AP Poll

The 2014 Arizona State Sun Devils football team represented Arizona State University in the 2014 NCAA Division I FBS football season. They were led by third-year head coach Todd Graham and played their home games at Sun Devil Stadium. They were a member of the South Division of the Pac-12 Conference. The Sun Devils finished the season 10–3 (6–3 in Pac-12 play) with a 36–31 victory over Duke in the Sun Bowl. It marked the first time since 1973 that Arizona State won ten or more games in back-to-back seasons.

== Personnel ==
=== Coaching staff ===
Name	Position	Seasons at ASU	Alma mater
Todd Graham	Head coach	3	East Central (1987)
Mike Norvell	Offensive coordinator, quarterbacks	3	Central Arkansas (2005)
Keith Patterson	Defensive coordinator	1	East Central (1986)
Chris Ball	Co-defensive coordinator, defensive backs	3	Western State College (1985)
Chris Thomsen	offensive line	2	TCU (1993)
Paul Randolph	Defensive line	3	Tennessee-Martin (1990)
Jackie Shipp	Defensive line	2	Oklahoma (1983)
Chip Long	Tight ends	3	North Alabama (2005)
DelVaughn Alexander	Wide receivers	3	USC (1995)
Bo Graham	Running backs	2	Tulsa (2006)

== Previous season ==
The 2013 Sun Devils finished 10–4 (8–1 in the Pac-12) and made an appearance in the Pac-12 Championship Game, where they were defeated by Stanford. They were invited to the Holiday Bowl, where they were upset by Texas Tech. It was the first time the Sun Devils won 10 games and finished ranked since the 2007 season.

=== Players drafted ===
Round	Pick	Player	Position	NFL team
3	82	Will Sutton	Defensive lineman	Chicago Bears
4	121	Carl Bradford	Outside linebacker	Green Bay Packers
6	201	Marion Grice	Running back	San Diego Chargers
UFA	–	Alden Darby	Defensive back	San Diego Chargers
UFA	–	Robert Nelson	Defensive back	Cleveland Browns
UFA	–	Davon Coleman	Defensive lineman	Dallas Cowboys
UFA	–	Chris Coyle	Tight end	Houston Texans
UFA	–	Chris Young	Linebacker	Houston Texans
UFA	–	Evan Finkenberg	Offensive lineman	Miami Dolphins

== Schedule ==
Date	Time	Opponent	Rank	Site	TV	Result	Attendance
August 28	7:30 pm	Weber State*	No. 19	Sun Devil Stadium; Tempe, AZ	P12N	W 45–14	52,133
September 6	4:00 pm	at New Mexico*	No. 17	University Stadium; Albuquerque, NM	CBSSN	W 58–23	25,742
September 13	7:00 pm	at Colorado	No. 16	Folsom Field; Boulder, CO	ESPNU	W 38–24	38,547
September 25	6:00 pm	No. 11 UCLA	No. 15	Sun Devil Stadium; Tempe, AZ	FS1	L 27–62	60,876
October 4	4:30 pm	at No. 16 USC		Los Angeles Memorial Coliseum; Los Angeles, CA	FOX	W 38–34	70,115
October 18	7:30 pm	No. 23 Stanford	No. 17	Sun Devil Stadium; Tempe, AZ	ESPN	W 26–10	59,012
October 25	7:45 pm	at Washington	No. 14	Husky Stadium; Seattle, WA	ESPN	W 24–10	64,666
November 1	8:00 pm	No. 17 Utah^{†}	No. 14	Sun Devil Stadium; Tempe, AZ	FS1	W 19–16 ^{OT}	53,754
November 8	1:30 pm	No. 10 Notre Dame*	No. 9	Sun Devil Stadium; Tempe, AZ	ABC	W 55–31	65,870
November 15	8:45 pm	at Oregon State	No. 6	Reser Stadium; Corvallis, OR	ESPN	L 27–35	40,525
November 22	11:00 am	Washington State	No. 13	Sun Devil Stadium; Tempe, AZ	P12N	W 52–31	51,428
November 28	1:30 pm	at No. 11 Arizona	No. 13	Arizona Stadium; Tucson, AZ (Territorial Cup)	FOX	L 35–42	56,083
December 27	12:00 pm	vs. Duke*	No. 15	Sun Bowl Stadium; El Paso, TX (Sun Bowl)	CBS	W 36–31	47,809
*Non-conference game; ^{†}Homecoming; Rankings from AP Poll and CFP Rankings after October 28 released prior to game; All times are in Mountain time

== Game summaries ==
=== Weber State ===
	1	2	3	4	Total
Wildcats	0	0	7	7	14
#19 Sun Devils	17	14	14	0	45

=== New Mexico ===
	1	2	3	4	Total
#17 Sun Devils	22	10	13	13	58
Lobos	7	14	0	2	23

=== Colorado ===
	1	2	3	4	Total
#16 Sun Devils	14	10	14	0	38
Buffaloes	0	14	3	7	24

=== UCLA ===
	1	2	3	4	Total
#11 Bruins	6	21	21	14	62
#15 Sun Devils	10	7	10	0	27

=== USC ===
	1	2	3	4	Total
Sun Devils	0	15	3	20	38
#16 Trojans	7	10	3	14	34

1st quarter scoring: USC – Nelson Agholor 53-yard punt return (Andre Heidari kick)

2nd quarter scoring: AS – Jaelen Strong 4-yard pass from Mike Bercovici (Alex Garoutte kick); AS – Strong 77-yard pass from Bercovici (Kody Kohl pass from Bercovici); USC – Javorius Allen 1-yard run (Heidari kick); USC – Heidari 35-yard field goal

3rd quarter scoring: AS – Garoutte 19-yard field goal; USC – Heidari 33-yard field goal

4th quarter scoring: USC – Cody Kessler 8-yard run (Heidari kick); AS – D. J. Foster 21-yard pass from Bercovici (Garoutte kick); USC – Allen 53-yard run (Heidari kick); AS – Cameron Smith 73-yard pass from Bercovici (Garoutte kick); AS – Strong 46-yard pass from Bercovici

=== Stanford ===
	1	2	3	4	Total
#23 Cardinal	0	0	3	7	10
#17 Sun Devils	0	14	3	9	26

=== Washington ===
	1	2	3	4	Total
#14 Sun Devils	0	10	0	14	24
Huskies	0	0	7	3	10

=== Utah ===
	1	2	3	4	OT	Total
#18 Utes	0	6	10	0	0	16
#15 Sun Devils	6	7	0	3	3	19

=== Notre Dame ===
	1	2	3	4	Total
#8 Fighting Irish	3	7	7	14	31
#11 Sun Devils	17	17	0	21	55

The Sun Devils played their biggest game in the Todd Graham era against highly ranked Notre Dame, a game that many analysts viewed as an elimination game for a spot in the first-ever College Football Playoff. ASU stormed out of the gates leading 34–3 late in the first half, and although the Irish managed to cut the lead to 3 in the fourth quarter, the Sun Devils pulled away and secured a 55–31 victory. With the win, ASU moved into the top-10 for the first time since the 2007 season.

=== Oregon State ===
	1	2	3	4	Total
#7 Sun Devils	10	14	0	3	27
Beavers	14	0	7	14	35

=== Washington State ===
	1	2	3	4	Total
Cougars	7	17	0	7	31
#13 Sun Devils	0	21	7	24	52

=== Arizona ===
	1	2	3	4	Total
#13 Sun Devils	7	14	0	14	35
#12 Wildcats	14	7	14	7	42

=== Duke (Sun Bowl) ===
	1	2	3	4	Total
Blue Devils	3	14	0	14	31
#15 Sun Devils	10	10	10	6	36

== Roster ==
The 2014 team roster can be viewed here

== Rankings ==
Ranking movements Legend: ██ Increase in ranking ██ Decrease in ranking RV = Received votes
	Week																
Poll	Pre	1	2	3	4	5	6	7	8	9	10	11	12	13	14	15	Final
AP	19	17	16	15	15	RV	20	17	14	15	11	7	13	13	17	15	12
Coaches	18	16	14	13	12	24	20	18	14	14	12	8	14	13	18	16	14
CFP	Not released									14	9	6	13	13	17	15	Not released

== Offseason ==
=== Players drafted ===
Round	Pick	Player	Position	NFL team
1	30	Damarious Randall	Defensive back	Green Bay Packers
3	70	Jaelen Strong	Wide receiver	Houston Texans
4	114	Jamil Douglas	Offensive lineman	Miami Dolphins
4	135	Marcus Hardison	Defensive lineman	Cincinnati Bengals
