= 2014 Pac-12 Football Championship Game =

- Conference Championship
Arizona Wildcats	Oregon Ducks
(10–2)	(11–1)
13	51
Head coach: Rich Rodriguez	Head coach: Mark Helfrich
AP / Coaches / CFP; 8 / 8 / 7	AP / Coaches / CFP; 3 / 3 / 2
	1	2	3	4	Total
Arizona	0	0	7	6	13
Oregon	6	17	21	7	51
- Date: December 5, 2014
- Season: 2014
- Stadium: Levi's Stadium
- Location: Santa Clara, CA
- MVP: Marcus Mariota, QB - Oregon
- Favorite: Oregon by 14.5
- National anthem: Jordin Sparks
- Referee: Land Clark
- Attendance: 45,618

United States TV coverage
- Network: FOX (TV); ESPN Radio
- Announcers: Tim Brando, Joel Klatt, & Jenny Taft (FOX); Bill Rosinski, David Norrie, & Joe Schad (ESPN Radio)

2014 Pac-12 Conference football standings
	Conf.			Overall
Team	W		L	W		L
North Division
No. 2 Oregon xy$^	8	–	1	13	–	2
Stanford	5	–	4	8	–	5
Washington	4	–	5	8	–	6
California	3	–	6	5	–	7
Oregon State	2	–	7	5	–	7
Washington State	2	–	7	3	–	9
South Division
No. 19 Arizona xy	7	–	2	10	–	4
No. 10 UCLA	6	–	3	10	–	3
No. 12 Arizona State	6	–	3	10	–	3
No. 20 USC	6	–	3	9	–	4
No. 21 Utah	5	–	4	9	–	4
Colorado	0	–	9	2	–	10
Championship: Oregon 51, Arizona 13
^ – College Football Playoff participant; $ – Conference champion; x – Division champion/co-champions; y – Championship game participant; Rankings from AP Poll

The 2014 Pac-12 Football Championship Game was played on Friday, December 5, 2014 at Levi's Stadium in Santa Clara, California. It was the fourth championship game in the history of the Pac-12 Conference. The game featured the Arizona Wildcats against the Oregon Ducks. The two teams met on October 2, with Arizona winning 31–24. Arizona had won two consecutive games versus Oregon. Oregon led the all-time series 24–16 heading into the game. The game started at 6:21 p.m. PST and was broadcast by FOX. The Oregon Ducks defeated the Arizona Wildcats 51–13 for the championship.

== History ==
The game was the fourth football conference championship for the Pac-12 Conference (or any of its predecessors). Last season, the Stanford Cardinal (7–2) defeated the Arizona State Sun Devils (8–1) 38–14 to win the Championship and represented the conference in the 2014 Rose Bowl Game in Pasadena, California.

== Teams ==
=== Arizona Wildcats ===
Arizona is playing in its first Pac-12 Championship game, having completed its first 10-win season. During the season, the team has out-scored its opponents by 84 points.

=== Oregon Ducks ===
The Oregon Ducks, with a record of 11-1 this season, will play their second conference championship game. The team defeated the UCLA Bruins 49–31 in the inaugural title game in 2011. During the season, the Ducks out-scored their Pac-12 conference opponents by 170 points. Coming into the game, they were the leader in total, scoring and rushing offense in the conference. Oregon also leads the conference in pass efficiency at 189.0. Quarterback Marcus Mariota completed 229 out of 334 pass attempts with 2 interceptions. Royce Freeman rushed 209 times for 1,185 yards during the regular season.

== Game summary ==
2014 Pac-12 Conference Football Championship Game – game summary

Quarter	1	2	3	4	Total
No. 8 Arizona	0	0	7	6	13
No. 3 Oregon	6	17	21	7	51

- Date: Friday, December 5, 2014
- Game time: 6:21 pm PST
- Game weather: Temperature: 61 °F (16 °C) • Wind: calm • Weather: mostly cloudy, light rain

Game information

First quarter

- ORE – Aidan Schneider 34-yard field goal
- ORE – Schneider 22-yard field goal

Second quarter

- ORE – Marcus Mariota 7-yard run (Schneider kick)
- ORE – Mariota 4-yard run (Schneider kick)
- ORE – Schneider 31-yard field goal

Third quarter

- ORE – Devon Allen 4-yard pass from Mariota (Schneider kick)
- ARI – Caleb Jones 69-yard pass from Jesse Scroggins (Casey Skowron kick)
- ORE – Darren Carrington 11-yard pass from Mariota (Schneider kick)
- ORE – Mariota 1-yard run (Schneider kick)

Fourth quarter

- ORE – Kenny Bassett 19-yard run (Schneider Kick)
- ARI – Jerrard Randall 25-yard run (Skowron Kick)

Top performers
Passing

- ORE – Marcus Mariota, 25/38, 313 yards, 2 TD
- ARI – Jesse Scroggins, 3/11, 79 yards, TD, INT

Running

- ORE – Royce Freeman, 21 carries, 114 yards
- ARI – Jerrard Randall, 10 carries, 81 yards, TD

Receiving

- ORE – Darren Carrington, 7 receptions, 126 yards, TD
- ARI – Cayleb Jones, 2 receptions, 71 yards, TD

Defense

- ORE –
- ARI –

Kicking

- ORE – Aidan Schneider, 3/4 FG, 34-yard long, 6/6 XP
- ARI – Casey Skowron, 2/2 XP

Special teams

- ORE – Johnathan Loyd, 4 PR, 61 yards
- ARI – Tyrell Johnson, 8 KR, 211 yards

=== Statistics ===
Statistics	Arizona	Oregon
First downs	10	31
Total offense: plays-yards	61-224	94-630
Rushes-yards (net)–TD	35-111-1	54-324-4
Passing yards (net)–TD	113-1	316-2
Passes: Comp–Att–Int	9-26-1	27-40-0
Fumbles: number-lost	1-1	1-0
Penalties: number–yards	8-67	13-97
Punts, (average yardage)	10-445 (44.5)	5-185 (48)
Kickoffs, (average yardage)	2-51 (25.5)	8-211 (26.375)
Sacks by: number–yards	0-0	4-35
Field goals: good–attempted	0-0	3-4
Points off turnovers	0	10
Time of possession	21:05	38:55

== See also ==
- List of Pac-12 Conference football champions
