= 2014 Mountain West Conference football season =

- League: NCAA Division I FBS (Football Bowl Subdivision)
- Sport: Football
- Duration: August 2014–January 2015
- Teams: 12
- TV partner(s): The Mtn., CBS Sports Network, ESPN on ABC, Versus

2015 NFL Draft
- Top draft pick: OT Ty Sambrailo, Colorado State
- Picked by: Denver Broncos, 59th pick

Regular Season

Football seasons
- 2013 2015

2014 Mountain West Conference football standings
	Conf.			Overall
Team	W		L	W		L
Mountain Division
No. 16 Boise State x$	7	–	1	12	–	2
Colorado State	6	–	2	10	–	3
Utah State	6	–	2	10	–	4
Air Force	5	–	3	10	–	3
New Mexico	2	–	6	4	–	8
Wyoming	2	–	6	4	–	8
West Division
Fresno State x	5	–	3	6	–	8
San Diego State	5	–	3	7	–	6
Nevada	4	–	4	7	–	6
Hawaii	3	–	5	4	–	9
San Jose State	2	–	6	3	–	9
UNLV	1	–	7	2	–	11
Championship: Boise State 28, Fresno State 14
$ – Conference champion; x – Division champion/co-champions; Rankings from AP Poll

The 2014 Mountain West Conference football season was 16th season of college football for the Mountain West Conference (MW). In the 2014 NCAA Division I FBS football season, the MW had 12 football members: Air Force, Boise State, Colorado State, Fresno State, Hawaiʻi, Nevada, New Mexico, San Diego State, San Jose State, UNLV, Utah State, and Wyoming.

This was the first time in four years that the membership of the MW did not change. Initially, UNLV was ineligible for postseason play due to their failure to meet Academic Progress Rate (APR) guidelines. However, the NCAA later accepted an updated APR report from UNLV, showing that the school had met guidelines, and lifted the ban.

== Rankings ==
Legend
	Increase in ranking
	Decrease in ranking
	Unranked the previous week
RV	Received votes but were not ranked in Top 25 of poll

		Pre	Wk 2	Wk 3	Wk 4	Wk 5	Wk 6	Wk 7	Wk 8	Wk 9	Wk 10	Wk 11	Wk 12	Wk 13	Wk 14	Wk 15	Wk 16	Final
Air Force	AP															RV	RV	
Air Force	C															RV	RV	
Air Force	CFP	Not released																
Boise State	AP	RV											RV	RV	25	22	21	
Boise State	C	RV	RV	RV	RV	RV					RV	RV	RV	RV	25	22	21	
Boise State	CFP	Not released													23	22	20	
Colorado State	AP								RV	RV	RV	RV	23	22	21	RV	RV	
Colorado State	C	RV	RV						RV	RV	RV	RV	25	23	21	RV	RV	
Colorado State	CFP	Not released																
Fresno State	AP																	
Fresno State	C																	
Fresno State	CFP	Not released																
Hawaiʻi	AP																	
Hawaiʻi	C																	
Hawaiʻi	CFP	Not released																
Nevada	AP	RV																
Nevada	C																	
Nevada	CFP	Not released																
New Mexico	AP																	
New Mexico	C																	
New Mexico	CFP	Not released																
San Diego State	AP																	
San Diego State	C																	
San Diego State	CFP	Not released																
San José State	AP																	
San José State	C																	
San José State	CFP	Not released																
UNLV	AP																	
UNLV	C																	
UNLV	CFP	Not released																
Utah State	AP	RV																
Utah State	C															RV		
Utah State	CFP	Not released																
Wyoming	AP																	
Wyoming	C																	
Wyoming	CFP	Not released																

== Schedule ==
A schedule for the season can be viewed here.

== Championship game ==
The championship game will be played on December 6, 2014. It will feature the highest ranked teams from two division championships.

== Awards and honors ==
=== All Conference teams ===
- Offensive Player of the Year: Garrett Grayson, SR., QB, Colorado State
- Defensive Player of the Year: Zach Vigil, SR., LB, Utah State
- Special Teams Player of the Year: Will Conant, SR., PK/P, Air Force
- Freshman of the Year: Devonte Boyd, WR, UNLV
- Coach of the Year: Jim McElwain, Colorado State

Offense:

Pos.	Name	Yr.	School	Name	Yr.	School
First Team				Second Team		
QB	Garrett Grayson	SR.	Colorado State	Grant Hedrick	SR.	Boise State
WR	Josh Harper	SR.	Fresno State	Tyler Winston	SO.	San Jose State
WR	Rashard Higgins	SO.	Colorado State	Devonte Boyd	FR.	UNLV
RB	Jay Ajayi	JR.	Boise State	Marteze Waller	JR.	Fresno State
RB	Donnel Pumphrey	SO.	San Diego State	Dee Hart	JR.	Colorado State
TE	Steven Walker	JR.	Colorado State	Jarred Gipson	SO.	Nevada
OL	Michael Husar Jr.	SR.	Air Force	Rees Odhiambo	JR.	Boise State
OL	Marcus Henry	JR.	Boise State	Cody Wichmann	SR.	Fresno State
OL	Ty Sambrailo	SR.	Colorado State	Matt Galas	SR.	Nevada
OL	LaMar Bratton	SR.	New Mexico	Terry Poole	SR.	New Mexico
OL	Kevin Whimpey	JR.	Utah State	Brett Boyko	SR.	UNLV
PK	Will Conant	SR.	Air Force	Nick Diaz	SO.	Utah State
PR/KR	JoJo Natson	JR.	Utah State	Lloyd Mills	SO.	San Diego State

Defense:

Pos.	Name	Yr.	School	Name	Yr.	School
First Team				Second Team		
DL	Kamalei Correa	SO.	Boise State	Alex Hansen	JR.	Air Force
DL	Tyeler Davison	JR.	Fresno State	Travis Raciti	SR.	San Jose State
DL	B. J. Larsen	SR.	Utah State	Brock Hekking	SR.	Nevada
DL	Eddie Yarbrough	JR.	Wyoming	Ian Seau	JR.	Nevada
LB	Dakota Cox	SO.	New Mexico	Jordan Pierce	SR.	Air Force
LB	Nick Vigil	SO.	Utah State	Tanner Vallejo	SO.	Boise State
LB	Zach Vigil	SR.	Utah State	Aaron Davis	SR.	Colorado State
DB	Weston Steelhammer	SO.	Air Force	Donte Deayon	JR.	Boise State
DB	Darian Thompson	JR.	Boise State	Damontae Kazee	SO.	San Diego State
DB	Derron Smith	SR.	Fresno State	J.J. Whittaker	SR.	San Diego State
DB	Frankie Sutera	SR.	Utah State	Cleveland Wallace III	SO.	San Jose State
P	Scott Harding	SR.	Hawai'i	Alex Boy	SO.	Nevada
