= 2014 Wyoming Cowboys football team =

American college football season

2014 Wyoming Cowboys football
- Conference: Mountain West Conference
- Mountain Division
- Record: 4–8 (2–6 MW)
- Head coach: Craig Bohl (1st season)
- Offensive coordinator: Brent Vigen (1st season)
- Offensive scheme: Pro-style
- Defensive coordinator: Steve Stanard (1st season)
- Base defense: 4–3
- Home stadium: War Memorial Stadium

2014 Mountain West Conference football standings
| | Conf. | | | Overall |
| Team | W | | L | W | | L |
|---|---|---|---|---|---|---|
Mountain Division
| No. 16 Boise State x$ | 7 | – | 1 | 12 | – | 2 |
| Colorado State | 6 | – | 2 | 10 | – | 3 |
| Utah State | 6 | – | 2 | 10 | – | 4 |
| Air Force | 5 | – | 3 | 10 | – | 3 |
| New Mexico | 2 | – | 6 | 4 | – | 8 |
| Wyoming | 2 | – | 6 | 4 | – | 8 |
West Division
| Fresno State x | 5 | – | 3 | 6 | – | 8 |
| San Diego State | 5 | – | 3 | 7 | – | 6 |
| Nevada | 4 | – | 4 | 7 | – | 6 |
| Hawaii | 3 | – | 5 | 4 | – | 9 |
| San Jose State | 2 | – | 6 | 3 | – | 9 |
| UNLV | 1 | – | 7 | 2 | – | 11 |
Championship: Boise State 28, Fresno State 14
$ – Conference champion; x – Division champion/co-champions; Rankings from AP Poll

The 2014 Wyoming Cowboys football team represented the University of Wyoming as a member of the Mountain West Conference (MW) during the 2014 NCAA Division I FBS football season. Led by first-year head coach Craig Bohl, the Cowboys compiled an overall record of 4–8 with a mark of 2–6 in conference play, tying for fifth place at the bottom of the standings in the MW's Mountain Division. The team played home games at War Memorial Stadium in Laramie, Wyoming.

== Schedule ==
| Date | Time | Opponent | Site | TV | Result | Attendance |
|---|---|---|---|---|---|---|
| August 30 | 2:00 p.m. | No. 5 (FCS) Montana* | War Memorial Stadium; Laramie, WY | RSRM | W 17–12 | 25,243 |
| September 6 | 8:15 p.m. | Air Force | War Memorial Stadium; Laramie, WY | ESPNU | W 17–13 | 21,246 |
| September 13 | 12:00 p.m. | at No. 2 Oregon* | Autzen Stadium; Eugene, OR | P12N | L 14–48 | 56,533 |
| September 20 | 2:00 p.m. | Florida Atlantic* | War Memorial Stadium; Laramie, WY | MWN | W 20–19 | 21,226 |
| September 27 | 10:00 a.m. | at No. 9 Michigan State* | Spartan Stadium; East Lansing, MI | ESPN2 | L 14–56 | 74,227 |
| October 11 | 10:00 p.m. | at Hawaii | Aloha Stadium; Halawa, HI (rivalry) | MWN | L 28–38 | 24,273 |
| October 18 | 2:00 p.m. | San Jose State^{†} | War Memorial Stadium; Laramie, WY | ESPN3 | L 20–27 ^{OT} | 19,627 |
| October 25 | 5:00 p.m. | at Colorado State | Hughes Stadium; Fort Collins, CO (Border War) | RSRM | L 31–45 | 32,529 |
| November 1 | 8:45 p.m. | at Fresno State | Bulldog Stadium; Fresno, CA | ESPN2 | W 45–17 | 32,164 |
| November 7 | 6:00 p.m. | Utah State | War Memorial Stadium; Laramie, WY (rivalry) | ESPN2 | L 3–20 | 14,430 |
| November 22 | 8:15 p.m. | Boise State | War Memorial Stadium; Laramie, WY | ESPN2 | L 14–63 | 15,821 |
| November 29 | 1:30 p.m. | at New Mexico | University Stadium; Albuquerque, NM | RSRM | L 30–36 | 18,489 |
*Non-conference game; ^{†}Homecoming; Rankings from AP Poll released prior to the game; All times are in Mountain time

== Game sumamries ==
=== Montana ===
| | 1 | 2 | 3 | 4 | Total |
|---|---|---|---|---|---|
| Grizzlies | 0 | 6 | 0 | 6 | 12 |
| Cowboys | 3 | 0 | 14 | 0 | 17 |

=== Air Force ===
| | 1 | 2 | 3 | 4 | Total |
|---|---|---|---|---|---|
| Falcons | 3 | 7 | 0 | 3 | 13 |
| Cowboys | 0 | 7 | 0 | 10 | 17 |

=== At No. 2 Oregon ===
| | 1 | 2 | 3 | 4 | Total |
|---|---|---|---|---|---|
| Cowboys | 7 | 0 | 0 | 7 | 14 |
| No. 2 Ducks | 0 | 20 | 21 | 7 | 48 |

=== Florida Atlantic ===
| | 1 | 2 | 3 | 4 | Total |
|---|---|---|---|---|---|
| Owls | 3 | 3 | 10 | 3 | 19 |
| Cowboys | 7 | 3 | 0 | 10 | 20 |

=== At Michigan State ===
| | 1 | 2 | 3 | 4 | Total |
|---|---|---|---|---|---|
| Cowboys | 7 | 7 | 0 | 0 | 14 |
| #9 Spartans | 21 | 21 | 7 | 7 | 56 |

=== At Hawaii ===
| | 1 | 2 | 3 | 4 | Total |
|---|---|---|---|---|---|
| Cowboys | 14 | 7 | 7 | 0 | 28 |
| Rainbow Warriors | 3 | 7 | 14 | 14 | 38 |

=== San Jose State ===
| | 1 | 2 | 3 | 4 | OT | Total |
|---|---|---|---|---|---|---|
| Spartans | 3 | 7 | 0 | 10 | 7 | 27 |
| Cowboys | 0 | 3 | 7 | 10 | 0 | 20 |

=== At Colorado State ===
| | 1 | 2 | 3 | 4 | Total |
|---|---|---|---|---|---|
| Cowboys | 10 | 0 | 0 | 3 | 13 |
| Rams | 7 | 3 | 0 | 6 | 16 |

=== At Fresno State ===
| | 1 | 2 | 3 | 4 | Total |
|---|---|---|---|---|---|
| Cowboys | 7 | 14 | 0 | 24 | 45 |
| Bulldogs | 7 | 3 | 0 | 7 | 17 |

=== Utah State ===
| | 1 | 2 | 3 | 4 | Total |
|---|---|---|---|---|---|
| Aggies | 17 | 0 | 0 | 3 | 20 |
| Cowboys | 0 | 3 | 0 | 0 | 3 |

=== Boise State ===
| | 1 | 2 | 3 | 4 | Total |
|---|---|---|---|---|---|
| Broncos | 14 | 14 | 28 | 7 | 63 |
| Cowboys | 0 | 7 | 0 | 7 | 14 |

=== At New Mexico ===
| | 1 | 2 | 3 | 4 | Total |
|---|---|---|---|---|---|
| Cowboys | 10 | 10 | 10 | 0 | 30 |
| Lobos | 14 | 7 | 15 | 0 | 36 |

== Personnel ==
=== Coaching staff ===
| Name | Position | Seasons at Wyoming | Alma mater | Before Wyoming |
|---|---|---|---|---|
| Craig Bohl | Head coach | 1 | Nebraska (1982) | North Dakota State – head coach (2013) |
| Steve Stanard | Defensive coordinator / Linebackers | 1 | Nebraska (1989) | North Dakota State – Linebackers (2013) |
| Brent Vigen | Offensive coordinator / quarterbacks | 1 | North Dakota State (1998) | North Dakota State – Offensive coordinator / quarterbacks (2013) |
| Mike Bath | Running Backs / Fullbacks | 1 | Miami, Ohio (2001) | Miami, Ohio – Interim Head Coach / offensive coordinator (2013) |
| David Brown II | Secondary / Safeties | 1 | Cal Poly (1996) | Fresno State – Safeties (2013) |
| Kenni Burns | Wide receivers | 1 | Indiana (2006) | North Dakota State – Wide receivers / recruiting coordinator (2013) |
| AJ Cooper | Special teams coordinator / Defensive Ends | 1 | North Dakota State (2006) | North Dakota State – Defensive ends / Co-Special Teams (2013) |
| Scott Fuchs | Offensive line | 2 | North Dakota State (1995) | North Dakota State (2013) |
| Pete Kaligis | Defensive tackles | 6 | Washington (1994) | Montana – Offensive line (2008) |
| John Richardson | Cornerbacks | 1 | North Dakota State (2010) | North Dakota State – Cornerbacks (2013) |
| Zach Duval | Director of Sports Performance / Head Strength and Conditioning Coach | 1 | Nebraska (1998) | Buffalo – Director of Sports Performance (2013) |
| Quinn Brown | Offensive Graduate Assistant | 2 | Missouri (2011) | William Jewell – Tight ends / assistant special teams coordinator (2012) |
| Shane LaDage | Offensive Graduate Assistant | 1 | Southwest Minnesota State (2010) | Saint Joseph's College – Wide receivers / tight ends (2013) |
| Kevin May | Defensive Graduate Assistant | 2 | Occidental College (2011) | Occidental College – Assistant |
| Greg Holsworth | Defensive Graduate Assistant | 1 | Occidental College (2012) | Occidental College – Linebackers |
| Cory Sullivan | Defensive Graduate Assistant | 2 | Oregon (2013) | Oregon – Student assistant (2012) |

=== Roster ===
2016 Wyoming Cowboys Football
| Quarterbacks: 1 Sam Stratton – senior (5'11", 190); 11 Colby Kirkegaard – (redshirt) senior (6'3", 205); 12 Aaron Young – sophomore (6'2", 201); 13 Tom Thornton – sophomore (6'1", 205); 15 Nick Smith – freshman (6'4", 215); 16 Austin Fort – freshman (6'4", 218); 17 Cameron Coffman – senior (6'2", 186); Running backs: 7 D.J. May – (redshirt) sophomore (5'11", 205); 8 Brian Hill – freshman (6'1" 204); 21 Shaun Wick – junior (5'10", 212); 22 Nico Evans – freshman (5'9", 186); 24 Omar Stover – sophomore (5'11", 207); 27 Oscar Nevermann – sophomore (6'1", 213); 32 Joshua Tapscott – (redshirt) freshman (5'9", 205); Fullbacks: 36 Drew Van Maanen – (redshirt) freshman (6'1", 222); Wide receivers: 3 Trey Norman – senior (6'1", 175); 4 Tanner Gentry – sophomore (6'2", 198); 5 Trent Sewell – sophomore (6'2", 196); 9 Jalen Claiborne – senior (5'9", 175); 17 Josh Smith – senior (6'3", 205); 19 Keenan Montgomery – senior (6'1", 186); 30 Jacob McGarvin – (redshirt) freshman (5'9", 159); 33 Dominic Rufran – senior (6'0", 188); 81 Justin Berger – senior (6'2", 198); 82 Tanner Simpson – sophomore (6'2", 188); 83 Jake Maulhardt – sophomore (6'6", 215); 87 Colin Gilbert – (redshirt) freshman (6'2", 184); Tight ends: 2 Eric Nzeocha – sophomore (6'3", 211); 25 J.D. Krill – senior (6'6", 246); 80 Brinkley Jolly – freshman (6'5", 265); 84 Grant Lewis – freshman (6'5", 225); 85 Tyree Mayfield – freshman (6'3", 223); 88 Jacob Hollister – sophomore (6'4", 230); 96 Micah Jones – sophomore (6'3", 220) | Offensive linemen: 52 Sam Hardy – sophomore (6'3", 294); 58 Taylor Knestis – (redshirt) freshman (6'5", 288); 59 Ryan Cummings – freshman (6'5", 294); 63 Rafe Kiely – junior (6'3", 306); 64 Charlie Renfree – (redshirt) freshman (6'3", 268); 65 Jesse Wilson – junior (6'1", 245); 66 Zach D'Amico – junior (5'11", 275); 67 Cole Turner – freshman (6'4", 285); 68 Brayton Medina – (redshirt) freshman (6'5", 302); 69 Richard Bettencourt – freshman (6'3", 284); 71 Austin Traphagan – junior (6'5", 272); 72 Jake Jones – junior (6'3", 295); 73 Chase Roullier – sophomore (6'4", 293); 75 Kurtis Stirneman – (redshirt) freshman (6'5", 270); 76 Jacob English – sophomore (6'5", 300); 77 Connor Rains – senior (6'7", 309); 78 Nathan Leddige – sophomore (6'5", 289); Defensive linemen: 34 Siaosi Hala'api'api – junior (6'2", 255); 42 Riley Lange – senior (6'3", 250); 50 Sonny Puletasi – senior (6'3", 251); 55 Eddie Yarbrough – junior (6'3", 251); 57 Chase Appleby – sophomore (6'0", 260); 60 Du'Ryan Ebbesen – (redshirt) freshman (6'2", 288); 61 Wyatt Mirich – (redshirt) junior (6'3", 205); 62 Seth Edeen – freshman (6'3", 203); 70 Conner Cain – freshman (6'4", 243); 86 Adam Kinder – sophomore (6'2", 206); 90 Uso Olive – sophomore (6'1", 301); 91 Troy Boyland – (redshirt) junior (6'2", 297); 91 John Jackson – freshman (6'2", 280); 93 Jonathan Kongbo – freshman (6'6", 250); 95 Patrick Mertens – senior (6'5", 285); 96 Sidney Malauulu – freshman (6'3", 283); 97 Dan Crook – senior (6'3", 272); 98 Dalton Fields – (redshirt) freshman (6'3", 272); 99 Joshua Stanton – freshman (6'3", 240) | Linebackers: 1 Jordan Stanton – senior (6'0", 246); 3 Jeff Lark – junior (6'2", 213); 9 Malkaam Muhammad – junior (6'0", 228); 21 Mark Nzeocha – senior (6'3", 239); 28 Nehemie Kankolongo – senior (5'11", 219); 30 Brecken Biggs – freshman (6'0", 178); 40 Sam Boyd – freshman (6'1", 190); 43 Devyn Harris – senior (6'3", 234); 45 Lucas Wacha – sophomore (6'1", 214); 48 Alex Bush – freshman (6'2", 231); 53 Alex Borgs – senior (6'2", 229); Defensive backs: 4 DeAndre Jones – senior (6'0", 186); 5 Jesse Sampson – senior (6'0", 200); 6 Ryon'e Winters – freshman (6'0", 180); 13 Darrenn White – senior (6'0", 192); 14 Tyran Finley – (redshirt) junior (5'9", 177); 18 Xavier Lewis – sophomore (6'0", 195); 20 Blair Burns – senior (5'10", 186); 23 Tim Kamana – (redshirt) freshman (5'11", 196); 24 Zaquoya Parham – junior (5'10", 181); 26 C.J. Jennings – freshman (5'10", 180); 29 Tim Hayes – sophomore (5'9", 189); 31 Chavez Pownell Jr. – freshman (5'11", 192); 32 Jake Schiffner – senior (5'10", 181); 35 Robert Priester – freshman (5'9", 168); 37 Luke Kellum – sophomore (5'10", 184); 48 Waddie Love – freshman (6'1", 188); Placekickers: 39 Justin Martin – junior (5'10", 178); 40 Stuart Williams – senior (5'11", 180); Punter: 41 Ethan Wood – sophomore (6'3", 173); Long snapper: 94 Brendan Turelli – sophomore (6'2", 225) |

== Statistics ==
=== Team ===
Team Statistics
| | Wyoming | Opponents |
|---|---|---|
| Points | 253 | 394 |
| First Downs | 221 | 252 |
| Rushing | 83 | 120 |
| Passing | 124 | 122 |
| Penalty | 14 | 10 |
| Rushing Yards | 1838 | 2436 |
| Rushing Attempts | 448 | 55 |
| Average Per Rush | 4.1 | 5.2 |
| Long | 89 | 69 |
| Rushing TDs | 17 | 24 |
| Passing Yards | 2733 | 2733 |
| Comp–Att | 212–375 | 214–325 |
| Comp % | 56.5% | 65.8% |
| Average Per Game | 227.8 | 227.8 |
| Average per Attempt | 7.3 | 8.4 |
| Passing TDs | 12 | 22 |
| INT's | 10 | 3 |
| Touchdowns | 31 | 51 |
| Passing | 12 | 22 |
| Rushing | 17 | 24 |
| Defensive | 2 | 2 |
| Interceptions | 3 | 10 |
| Yards | 51 | 152 |
| Long | 51 | 38 |
| Total Offense | 4571 | 5169 |
| Total Plays | 823 | 790 |
| Average Per Yards/Game | 380.9 | 430.8 |
| Kick Returns: # – Yards | 29–581 | 34–830 |
| TDs | 0 | 1 |
| Long | 36 | 97 |
| Punts | 67 | 51 |
| Yards | 2761 | 2208 |
| Average | 41.2 | 43.3 |
| Punt Returns: # – Yards | 16–163 | 17–311 |
| TDs | 0 | 2 |
| Long | 39 | 80 |
| Fumbles – Fumbles Lost | 14–8 | 21–13 |
| Opposing TD's | 51 | 31 |
| Penalties – Yards | 63–520 | 56–519 |
| 3rd–Down Conversions | 76/191 | 69/160 |
| 4th–Down Conversions | 9/20 | 5/15 |
| Takeaways | 16 | 18 |
| Field Goals | 12–17 | 13–19 |
| Extra Point | 31–31 | 47–49 |
| Sacks | 14 | 44 |
| Sack Against | 44 | 14 |
| Yards | 93 | 277 |

=== Offense ===
Passing Statistics
| NAME | GP | CMP | ATT | YDS | CMP% | TD | INT |
|---|---|---|---|---|---|---|---|
| Colby Kirkegaard | 12 | 206 | 359 | 2660 | 57.4 | 12 | 9 |
| Tom Thornton | 4 | 4 | 10 | 50 | 40.0 | 0 | 1 |
| Sam Stratton | 11 | 2 | 5 | 23 | 40.7 | 0 | 0 |
| Team | 6 | 0 | 1 | 0 | 0.0 | 0 | 0 |

Rushing Statistics
| NAME | GP | CAR | YDS | LONG | TD |
|---|---|---|---|---|---|
| Brian Hill | 12 | 145 | 796 | 89 | 7 |
| Shaun Wick | 9 | 126 | 753 | 57 | 6 |
| D.J. May | 6 | 56 | 260 | 58 | 2 |
| Josh Tapscott | 5 | 15 | 80 | 48 | 2 |
| Sam Stratton | 11 | 6 | 21 | 17 | 0 |
| Dominic Rufran | 12 | 6 | 15 | 18 | 0 |
| J.D. Krill | 12 | 0 | 10 | 0 | 0 |
| Tom Thornton | 4 | 5 | 9 | 6 | 0 |
| Omar Stover | 5 | 3 | 5 | 3 | 0 |
| Jordan Ellis | 8 | 1 | 5 | 5 | 0 |
| Tanner Gentry | 12 | 2 | 3 | 2 | 0 |
| Jalen Claiborne | 12 | 2 | 1 | 1 | 0 |
| TOTALS | 12 | 448 | 2207 | 89 | 17 |

Receiving Statistics
| NAME | GP | REC | YDS | LONG | TD |
|---|---|---|---|---|---|
| Dominic Rufran | 12 | 45 | 596 | 88 | 0 |
| Jalen Claiborne | 12 | 41 | 576 | 52 | 3 |
| Tanner Gentry | 12 | 32 | 435 | 44 | 2 |
| Jake Maulhardt | 12 | 21 | 274 | 53 | 1 |
| Jacob Hollister | 12 | 17 | 244 | 66 | 2 |
| Brian Hill | 12 | 13 | 204 | 40 | 0 |
| Shaun Wick | 9 | 10 | 62 | 12 | 0 |
| D.J. May | 6 | 8 | 144 | 41 | 2 |
| Eric Nzeocha | 12 | 8 | 65 | 16 | 0 |
| J.D. Krill | 12 | 7 | 48 | 15 | 2 |
| Trey Norman | 11 | 3 | 19 | 9 | 0 |
| Jordan Ellis | 8 | 2 | 28 | 16 | 1 |
| Drew Van Maanen | 12 | 2 | 25 | 23 | 0 |
| Joshua Tapscott | 5 | 1 | 10 | 10 | 0 |
| Keenan Montgomery | 12 | 1 | 4 | 4 | 0 |
| TOTALS | 12 | 212 | 2733 | 88 | 12 |

=== Defense ===
Defensive Statistics
| # | NAME | GP | SOLO | AST | TOT | TFL-YDS | SACKS | INT-YDS | BU | QBH | FR–YDS | FF | BLK | SAF |
|---|---|---|---|---|---|---|---|---|---|---|---|---|---|---|
| 43 | Devyn Harris | 12 | 43 | 40 | 83 | 5.5–13 | 0.0–0 | 0–0 | 2 | 0 | 2–78 | 2 | 0 | 0 |
| 55 | Eddie Yarbrough | 12 | 31 | 32 | 63 | 10.5–49 | 4.0–28 | 0–0 | 1 | 2 | 1–0 | 1 | 0 | 0 |
| 20 | Blair Burns | 12 | 38 | 25 | 63 | 1.5–12 | 0.0–0 | 0–0 | 2 | 1 | 2–63 | 2 | 0 | 0 |
| 10 | Mark Nzeocha | 7 | 35 | 24 | 59 | 3.0–16 | 2.0–12 | 0–0 | 5 | 0 | 1–0 | 2 | 0 | 0 |
| 45 | Lucas Wacha | 12 | 31 | 21 | 52 | 4.0–8 | 0.0–0 | 0–0 | 1 | 0 | 0–0 | 0 | 0 | 0 |
| 1 | Jordan Stanton | 10 | 25 | 20 | 45 | 2.0–5 | 1.0–4 | 0–0 | 0 | 0 | 1–0 | 1 | 0 | 0 |
| 23 | Tim Kamana | 12 | 27 | 17 | 44 | 0.0–0 | 0.0–0 | 1–0 | 2 | 0 | 0–0 | 0 | 0 | 0 |
| 13 | Darrenn White | 7 | 23 | 19 | 42 | 1.5–3 | 0.0–0 | 0–0 | 1 | 0 | 1–0 | 1 | 0 | 0 |
| 4 | DeAndre Jones | 8 | 28 | 13 | 41 | 0.0–0 | 0.0–0 | 0–0 | 2 | 0 | 0–0 | 0 | 0 | 0 |
| 95 | Patrick Mertens | 12 | 14 | 25 | 39 | 5.0–16 | 2.0–12 | 0–0 | 1 | 1 | 2–0 | 0 | 0 | 0 |
| 35 | Robert Priester | 11 | 29 | 10 | 39 | 0.0–0 | 0.0–0 | 0–0 | 2 | 0 | 1–0 | 2 | 0 | 0 |
| 3 | William Tutein | 12 | 24 | 11 | 35 | 2.0–5 | 0.0–0 | 0–0 | 0 | 0 | 0–0 | 1 | 1 | 0 |
| 5 | Jesse Sampson | 6 | 20 | 13 | 33 | 0.5–2 | 0.0–0 | 0–0 | 4 | 0 | 0–0 | 0 | 0 | 0 |
| 90 | Uso Olive | 12 | 14 | 6 | 20 | 2.0–3 | 0.0–0 | 0–0 | 0 | 0 | 0–0 | 0 | 0 | 0 |
| 34 | Siaosi Hala'api'api | 12 | 13 | 7 | 20 | 5.5–50 | 3.0–34 | 0–0 | 0 | 0 | 0–0 | 0 | 0 | 0 |
| 42 | Riley Lange | 10 | 9 | 8 | 17 | 2.0–3 | 0.0–0 | 0–0 | 0 | 0 | 0–0 | 0 | 0 | 0 |
| 14 | Tyran Finley | 11 | 14 | 3 | 17 | 2.0–7 | 0.0–0 | 2–51 | 1 | 0 | 0–0 | 0 | 0 | 0 |
| 57 | Chase Appleby | 12 | 7 | 5 | 12 | 1.0–4 | 0.0–0 | 0–0 | 2 | 0 | 1–0 | 0 | 0 | 0 |
| 50 | Sonny Puletasi | 8 | 4 | 7 | 11 | 1.5–3 | 0.0–0 | 0–0 | 1 | 0 | 1–0 | 0 | 0 | 0 |
| 37 | Luke Kellum | 4 | 7 | 3 | 10 | 0.0–0 | 0.0–0 | 0–0 | 0 | 0 | 0–0 | 0 | 0 | 0 |
| 29 | Tim Hayes | 8 | 6 | 4 | 10 | 0.0–0 | 0.0–0 | 0–0 | 1 | 0 | 0–0 | 0 | 0 | 0 |
| 16 | Jeff Lark | 9 | 2 | 8 | 10 | 0.5–0 | 0.0–0 | 0–0 | 0 | 0 | 0–0 | 0 | 0 | 0 |
| 18 | Xavier Lewis | 11 | 5 | 4 | 9 | 0.0–0 | 0.0–0 | 0–0 | 0 | 0 | 0–0 | 0 | 0 | 0 |
| 62 | Seth Edeen | 4 | 4 | 2 | 6 | 2.0–3 | 2.0–3 | 0–0 | 0 | 0 | 0–0 | 0 | 0 | 0 |
| 6 | Ryon'e Winters | 9 | 4 | 0 | 4 | 0.0–0 | 0.0–0 | 0–0 | 0 | 0 | 0–0 | 0 | 0 | 0 |
| 51 | Troy Boyland | 8 | 1 | 3 | 4 | 0.0–0 | 0.0–0 | 0–0 | 0 | 0 | 0–0 | 0 | 0 | 0 |
| 3 | Trey Norman | 11 | 3 | 0 | 3 | 0.0–0 | 0.0–0 | 0–0 | 0 | 0 | 0–0 | 0 | 0 | 0 |
| 27 | Oscar Nevermann | 11 | 3 | 0 | 3 | 0.0–0 | 0.0–0 | 0–0 | 0 | 0 | 0–0 | 0 | 0 | 0 |
| 5 | Malkaam Muhammad | 6 | 1 | 1 | 2 | 0.0–0 | 0.0–0 | 0–0 | 0 | 0 | 0–0 | 0 | 0 | 0 |
| 98 | Dalton Fields | 12 | 0 | 2 | 2 | 0.0–0 | 0.0–0 | 0–0 | 0 | 0 | 0–0 | 0 | 0 | 0 |
| 73 | Chase Roullier | 12 | 2 | 0 | 2 | 0.0–0 | 0.0–0 | 0–0 | 0 | 0 | 0–0 | 0 | 0 | 0 |
| 21 | Shaun Wick | 9 | 1 | 1 | 2 | 0.0–0 | 0.0–0 | 0–0 | 0 | 0 | 0–0 | 0 | 0 | 0 |
| 28 | Nehemie Kankolongo | 8 | 1 | 0 | 1 | 0.0–0 | 0.0–0 | 0–0 | 0 | 0 | 0–0 | 0 | 0 | 0 |
| 53 | Alex Borgs | 6 | 0 | 1 | 1 | 0.0–0 | 0.0–0 | 0–0 | 0 | 0 | 0–0 | 0 | 0 | 0 |
| 36 | Drew Van Maanen | 12 | 1 | 0 | 1 | 0.0–0 | 0.0–0 | 0–0 | 0 | 0 | 0–0 | 0 | 0 | 0 |
| 25 | J.D. Krill | 12 | 1 | 0 | 1 | 0.0–0 | 0.0–0 | 0–0 | 0 | 0 | 0–0 | 0 | 0 | 0 |
| 2 | Eric Nzeocha | 12 | 1 | 0 | 1 | 0.0–0 | 0.0–0 | 0–0 | 0 | 0 | 0–0 | 0 | 1 | 0 |
| 94 | Brendan Turelli | 11 | 1 | 0 | 1 | 0.0–0 | 0.0–0 | 0–0 | 0 | 0 | 0–0 | 0 | 0 | 0 |
| 83 | Jake Maulhardt | 12 | 1 | 0 | 1 | 0.0–0 | 0.0–0 | 0–0 | 0 | 0 | 0–0 | 0 | 0 | 0 |
| 7 | D.J. May | 6 | 1 | 0 | 1 | 0.0–0 | 0.0–0 | 0–0 | 0 | 0 | 0–0 | 0 | 0 | 0 |
| 40 | Stuart Williams | 12 | 0 | 1 | 1 | 0.0–0 | 0.0–0 | 0–0 | 0 | 0 | 0–0 | 0 | 0 | 0 |
| TM | Team | 6 | 1 | 0 | 1 | 0.0–0 | 0.0–0 | 0–0 | 0 | 0 | 1–0 | 0 | 0 | 0 |
| 8 | Brian Hill | 12 | 0 | 1 | 1 | 0.0–0 | 0.0–0 | 0–0 | 0 | 0 | 0–0 | 0 | 0 | 0 |
| | TOTAL | 12 | 475 | 338 | 813 | 52–202 | 14–93 | 3–51 | 28 | 4 | 13–141 | 11 | 2 | 0 |
| | OPPONENTS | 12 | 467 | 372 | 839 | 81–362 | 44–277 | 10–152 | 40 | 17 | 8–0 | 11 | 3 | 0 |

Key: SOLO: Solo Tackles, AST: Assisted Tackles, TOT: Total Tackles, TFL: Tackles-for-loss, SACK: Quarterback Sacks, INT: Interceptions, BU: Passes Broken Up, QBH: Quarterback Hits, FF: Forced Fumbles, FR: Fumbles Recovered, BLK: Kicks or Punts Blocked, SAF: Safeties

Interceptions Statistics
| NAME | NO. | YDS | AVG | TD | LNG |
|---|---|---|---|---|---|
| Tyran Finley | 2 | 51 | 25.5 | 0 | 51 |
| Tim Kamana | 1 | 0 | 0.0 | 0 | 0 |
| TOTALS | 3 | 51 | 17.0 | 0 | 51 |

=== Special teams ===
Kicking statistics
| NAME | XPM | XPA | XP% | FGM | FGA | FG% | 1–19 | 20–29 | 30–39 | 40–49 | 50+ | LNG | PTS |
|---|---|---|---|---|---|---|---|---|---|---|---|---|---|
| Stuart Williams | 31 | 31 | 100.0% | 12 | 17 | 70.6% | 2–2 | 2–2 | 5–5 | 2–6 | 1–2 | 50 | 67 |
| TOTALS | 31 | 31 | 100.0% | 12 | 17 | 70.6% | 2–2 | 2–2 | 5–5 | 2–6 | 1–2 | 50 | 67 |

Kick return statistics
| NAME | RTNS | YDS | AVG | TD | LNG |
|---|---|---|---|---|---|
| Jalen Claiborne | 13 | 226 | 17.4 | 0 | 24 |
| D.J. May | 10 | 242 | 24.2 | 0 | 36 |
| Tyran Finley | 3 | 56 | 18.7 | 0 | 20 |
| Dominic Rufran | 2 | 57 | 28.5 | 0 | 33 |
| J.D. Krill | 1 | 0 | 0.0 | 0 | 0 |
| TOTALS | 29 | 581 | 20.0 | 0 | 36 |

Punting statistics
| NAME | PUNTS | YDS | AVG | LONG | TB | FC | I–20 | 50+ | BLK |
|---|---|---|---|---|---|---|---|---|---|
| Ethan Wood | 66 | 2733 | 41.4 | 67 | 5 | 18 | 18 | 8 | 1 |
| Team | 1 | 28 | 28.0 | 28 | 0 | 0 | 0 | 0 | 0 |
| TOTALS | 67 | 2761 | 41.2 | 67 | 5 | 18 | 18 | 8 | 1 |

Punt return statistics
| NAME | RTNS | YDS | AVG | TD | LONG |
|---|---|---|---|---|---|
| Jalen Claiborne | 14 | 139 | 9.9 | 0 | 39 |
| Eric Nzeocha | 1 | 21 | 21.0 | 0 | 0 |
| Tim Kamana | 1 | 3 | 3.0 | 0 | 3 |
| TOTALS | 16 | 163 | 10.2 | 0 | 39 |

=== Scores by quarter (all opponents) ===
| | 1 | 2 | 3 | 4 | OT | Total |
|---|---|---|---|---|---|---|
| All opponents | 95 | 116 | 102 | 74 | 7 | 394 |
| Wyoming | 58 | 61 | 45 | 89 | 0 | 253 |
