= 2014 Fresno State Bulldogs football team =

American college football season

2014 Fresno State Bulldogs football

MW West Division champion

MW Championship Game, L 14–28 vs. Boise State

Hawaii Bowl, L 6–30 vs. Rice
- Conference: Mountain West Conference
- West Division
- Record: 6–8 (5–3 MW)
- Head coach: Tim DeRuyter (3rd season)
- Offensive coordinator: Dave Schramm (3rd season)
- Offensive scheme: Spread
- Defensive coordinator: Nick Toth (3rd season)
- Base defense: 3–4
- Home stadium: Bulldog Stadium

2014 Mountain West Conference football standings
	Conf.			Overall
Team	W		L	W		L
Mountain Division
No. 16 Boise State x$	7	–	1	12	–	2
Colorado State	6	–	2	10	–	3
Utah State	6	–	2	10	–	4
Air Force	5	–	3	10	–	3
New Mexico	2	–	6	4	–	8
Wyoming	2	–	6	4	–	8
West Division
Fresno State x	5	–	3	6	–	8
San Diego State	5	–	3	7	–	6
Nevada	4	–	4	7	–	6
Hawaii	3	–	5	4	–	9
San Jose State	2	–	6	3	–	9
UNLV	1	–	7	2	–	11
Championship: Boise State 28, Fresno State 14
$ – Conference champion; x – Division champion/co-champions; Rankings from AP Poll

The 2014 Fresno State Bulldogs football team represented California State University, Fresno in the 2014 NCAA Division I FBS football season. The Bulldogs were led by third-year head coach Tim DeRuyter and played their home games at Bulldog Stadium. They were members of the Mountain West Conference and completed in the West Division. They finished the season 6–8 overall and 5–3 in conference to tie for first place in the West Division, but due to their head-to-head win over San Diego State, they were crowned West Division champions. They lost 28–14 to Mountain Division champion Boise State in the Mountain West Championship Game. They were invited to the Hawaii Bowl where they lost to Rice.

== Schedule ==
Date	Time	Opponent	Site	TV	Result	Attendance
August 30	4:30 pm	at No. 15 USC*	Los Angeles Memorial Coliseum; Los Angeles, CA	FOX	L 13–52	76,037
September 6	12:00 pm	at Utah*	Rice-Eccles Stadium; Salt Lake City, UT	P12N	L 27–59	45,864
September 13	7:30 pm	Nebraska*	Bulldog Stadium; Fresno, CA	CBSSN	L 19–55	41,031
September 20	7:00 pm	Southern Utah*	Bulldog Stadium; Fresno, CA	MWN	W 56–16	32,645
September 26	5:00 pm	at New Mexico	University Stadium; Albuquerque, NM	ESPN2	W 35–24	21,005
October 3	7:00 pm	San Diego State	Bulldog Stadium; Fresno, CA (Battle for the Oil Can)	CBSSN	W 24–13	33,894
October 10	7:00 pm	at UNLV	Sam Boyd Stadium; Whitney, NV	CBSSN	L 27–30 ^{OT}	15,398
October 17	5:00 pm	at Boise State	Albertsons Stadium; Boise, ID (Battle for the Milk Can)	ESPN	L 27–37	35,008
November 1	7:45 pm	Wyoming	Bulldog Stadium; Fresno, CA	ESPN2	L 17–45	32,164
November 8	7:30 pm	San Jose State^{†}	Bulldog Stadium; Fresno, CA (Valley Cup)	CBSSN	W 38–24	36,909
November 22	7:30 pm	at Nevada	Mackay Stadium; Reno, NV	ESPNU	W 40–20	21,446
November 29	4:00 pm	Hawaii	Bulldog Stadium; Fresno, CA (rivalry)	MWN	W 28–21	32,580
December 6	7:00 pm	at No. 22 Boise State	Albertsons Stadium; Boise, ID (MWC Championship Game)	CBS	L 14–28	26,101
December 24	5:00 pm	vs. Rice*	Aloha Stadium; Honolulu, HI (Hawaii Bowl)	ESPN	L 6–30	25,365
*Non-conference game; ^{†}Homecoming; Rankings from AP Poll released prior to game; All times are in Pacific time

Schedule source:

== Game summaries ==
=== At No. 15 USC ===
	1	2	3	4	Total
Bulldogs	0	7	6	0	13
No. 15 Trojans	21	10	21	0	52

=== At Utah ===
	1	2	3	4	Total
Bulldogs	0	7	7	13	27
Utes	17	14	14	14	59

=== Nebraska ===
	1	2	3	4	Total
Cornhuskers	14	13	14	14	55
Bulldogs	2	3	7	7	19

=== Southern Utah ===
	1	2	3	4	Total
Thunderbirds	0	9	0	7	16
Bulldogs	0	21	21	14	56

=== At New Mexico ===
	1	2	3	4	Total
Bulldogs	0	14	14	7	35
Lobos	3	14	7	0	24

=== San Diego State ===
	1	2	3	4	Total
Aztecs	0	3	3	7	13
Bulldogs	10	0	7	7	24

=== At UNLV ===
	1	2	3	4	OT	Total
Bulldogs	0	0	14	13	0	27
Rebels	3	14	7	3	3	30

=== At Boise State ===
	1	2	3	4	Total
Bulldogs	10	0	17	0	27
Broncos	13	7	7	10	37

=== Wyoming ===
	1	2	3	4	Total
Cowboys	7	14	0	24	45
Bulldogs	7	3	0	7	17

=== San Jose State ===
	1	2	3	4	Total
Spartans	14	0	7	3	24
Bulldogs	7	21	7	3	38

=== At Nevada ===
	1	2	3	4	Total
Bulldogs	7	21	10	2	40
Wolf Pack	7	13	0	0	20

=== Hawai'i ===
	1	2	3	4	Total
Rainbow Warriors	0	0	0	21	21
Bulldogs	21	7	0	0	28

=== At No. 22 Boise State (MWC Championship game) ===
	1	2	3	4	Total
Bulldogs	0	0	7	7	14
No. 22 Broncos	14	7	7	0	28

=== Vs. Rice (Hawaii Bowl) ===
	1	2	3	4	Total
Bulldogs	3	3	0	0	6
Owls	16	0	7	7	30
