= 2014 San Jose State Spartans football team =

American college football season

2014 San Jose State Spartans football
- Conference: Mountain West Conference
- West Division
- Record: 3–9 (2–6 MW)
- Head coach: Ron Caragher (2nd season)
- Offensive coordinator: Jimmie Dougherty (2nd season)
- Offensive scheme: Multiple
- Defensive coordinator: Greg Robinson (1st season)
- Base defense: 4–3
- Home stadium: Spartan Stadium

2014 Mountain West Conference football standings
	Conf.			Overall
Team	W		L	W		L
Mountain Division
No. 16 Boise State x$	7	–	1	12	–	2
Colorado State	6	–	2	10	–	3
Utah State	6	–	2	10	–	4
Air Force	5	–	3	10	–	3
New Mexico	2	–	6	4	–	8
Wyoming	2	–	6	4	–	8
West Division
Fresno State x	5	–	3	6	–	8
San Diego State	5	–	3	7	–	6
Nevada	4	–	4	7	–	6
Hawaii	3	–	5	4	–	9
San Jose State	2	–	6	3	–	9
UNLV	1	–	7	2	–	11
Championship: Boise State 28, Fresno State 14
$ – Conference champion; x – Division champion/co-champions; Rankings from AP Poll

The 2014 San Jose State Spartans football team represented San Jose State University in the 2014 NCAA Division I FBS football season. The Spartans were led by second-year head coach Ron Caragher and played their home games at Spartan Stadium. They were members of the Mountain West Conference in the West Division. They finished the season 3–9, 2–6 in Mountain West play to finish in fifth place in the West Division.

== Schedule ==
Date	Time	Opponent	Site	TV	Result	Attendance
August 28	7:00 pm	North Dakota*	Spartan Stadium; San Jose, CA	ESPN3	W 42–10	10,371
September 6	4:00 pm	at No. 5 Auburn*	Jordan–Hare Stadium; Auburn, AL	ESPN2	L 13–59	87,451
September 20	2:00 pm	at Minnesota*	TCF Bank Stadium; Minneapolis, MN	BTN	L 7–24	47,739
September 27	7:30 pm	Nevada	Spartan Stadium; San Jose, CA	CBSSN	L 10–21	14,693
October 4	5:00 pm	UNLV^{†}	Spartan Stadium; San Jose, CA	ESPNews	W 33–10	14,427
October 18	1:00 pm	at Wyoming	War Memorial Stadium; Laramie, WY	ESPN3	W 27–20 ^{OT}	19,627
October 25	10:00 am	at Navy*	Navy–Marine Corps Memorial Stadium; Annapolis, MD	CBSSN	L 31–41	30,612
November 1	4:00 pm	Colorado State	Spartan Stadium; San Jose, CA	CBSSN	L 31–38	17,887
November 8	7:30 pm	at Fresno State	Bulldog Stadium; Fresno, CA (Valley Trophy)	CBSSN	L 24–38	36,909
November 15	1:30 pm	Hawaii	Spartan Stadium; San Jose, CA (Dick Tomey Legacy Game)	Oc 16	L 0–13	17,962
November 21	6:30 pm	at Utah State	Romney Stadium; Logan, UT	ESPN2	L 7–41	18,428
November 29	12:30 pm	at San Diego State	Qualcomm Stadium; San Diego, CA	CBSSN	L 7–38	24,391
*Non-conference game; ^{†}Homecoming; Rankings from AP Poll released prior to the game; All times are in Pacific time

Schedule source:

== Game summaries ==
=== North Dakota ===
	1	2	3	4	Total
Fighting Hawks	0	3	0	7	10
Spartans	14	7	14	7	42

=== At No. 5 Auburn ===
	1	2	3	4	Total
Spartans	7	3	3	0	13
No. 5 Tigers	14	24	7	14	59

=== At Minnesota ===
	1	2	3	4	Total
Spartans	7	0	0	0	7
Gophers	10	7	0	7	24

=== Nevada ===
	1	2	3	4	Total
Wolf Pack	0	7	0	14	21
Spartans	0	3	7	0	10

=== UNLV ===
	1	2	3	4	Total
Rebels	7	0	0	3	10
Spartans	0	16	10	7	33

=== At Wyoming ===
	1	2	3	4	OT	Total
Spartans	3	7	0	10	7	27
Cowboys	0	3	7	10	0	20

=== At Navy ===
	1	2	3	4	Total
Spartans	3	14	0	14	31
Midshipmen	0	24	7	10	41

=== Colorado State ===
	1	2	3	4	Total
Rams	7	10	7	14	38
Spartans	7	7	3	14	31

=== At Fresno State ===
	1	2	3	4	Total
Spartans	14	0	7	3	24
Bulldogs	7	21	7	3	38

=== Hawaii ===
	1	2	3	4	Total
Rainbow Warriors	0	10	0	3	13
Spartans	0	0	0	0	0

=== At Utah State ===
	1	2	3	4	Total
Spartans	0	7	0	0	7
Aggies	7	7	14	13	41

=== At San Diego State ===
	1	2	3	4	Total
Spartans	0	0	0	7	7
Aztecs	7	14	7	10	38

== Coaching staff ==
Ron Caragher returned for his second season as San Jose State head coach. New at defensive coordinator was Greg Robinson, a longtime coach who previously served as defensive coordinator at the University of Texas at Austin in 2013. Robinson's career also included a stint as defensive coordinator for the NFL's Denver Broncos from 1995 to 2000, including the Broncos' Super Bowl-winning seasons in 1997 and 1998.

Name	Position	Seasons at San Jose State	Alma mater
Ron Caragher	Head coach	2	UCLA (1990)
Jimmie Dougherty	Offensive coordinator, quarterbacks, assistant head coach	2	Missouri (2001)
Keith Carter	Offensive line, running game	1	UCLA (2005)
Fred Guidici	Special teams	3	San Jose State (1989)
Terry Malley	Wide receivers, recruiting coordinator	6	Santa Clara (1976)
Greg Robinson	Defensive coordinator, linebackers	1	Pacific (1975)
James Jones	Defensive line	2	Texas Southern (1998)
Joe Staab	Outside linebackers	2	San Diego (2008)
Donte Williams	Defensive backs	2	Idaho State (2006)
