= Boise State–Fresno State football rivalry =

American college football rivalry

Battle of the Milk Can
- Boise State Broncos Fresno State Bulldogs
- Sport: College football
- First meeting: September 17, 1977; Fresno State, 42–7
- Latest meeting: October 10, 2026; Boise State, 38–31
- Trophy: Milk Can

Statistics
- Total meetings: 28
- All-time series: Boise State, 18–10 (.643)
- Largest victory: Boise State, 51 points 61–10 (2008); 51–0 (2010)
- Longest win streak: Boise State, 7 (2006–2012)
- Current win streak: Boise State, 1 (2026–present)

Locations of Boise State and Fresno State

The Boise State–Fresno State football rivalry, commonly associated with the Battle of the Milk Can, is an American college football rivalry between the Boise State Broncos and the Fresno State Bulldogs. The programs first met in 1977, but the series developed into a regular conference rivalry after Boise State joined the Western Athletic Conference (WAC) in 2001.

Beginning with the 2005 game, the regular-season winner has been associated with the Milk Can, a traveling trophy representing the dairy industries of Idaho and California's Central Valley. The trophy does not change hands when the programs meet in a conference championship game.

Boise State and Fresno State competed together in the WAC and later the Mountain West Conference, meeting four times in the Mountain West Conference Football Championship Game. Both schools became members of the Pac-12 Conference on July 1, 2026. Through the 2026 meeting, Boise State leads the all-time series, 18–10.

== History ==
=== Early meetings and WAC era ===
Fresno State won each of the first three meetings between the schools: 42–7 in Fresno in 1977, 37–21 in Boise in 1984, and 41–7 in Fresno in 1996.

The series took on greater significance after Boise State joined Fresno State in the WAC in 2001. In their first meeting as conference opponents, Boise State upset previously unbeaten No. 8 Fresno State 35–30 in Fresno. The loss damaged the Bulldogs' hopes of earning a berth in a Bowl Championship Series game.

From 2001 through 2012, the teams met every season, with Boise State winning 11 of the 12 games. Fresno State's lone victory during that stretch came in 2005, when the No. 20 Bulldogs defeated Boise State 27–7 and ended the Broncos' WAC-record 31-game conference winning streak.

Boise State left the WAC and officially joined the Mountain West on July 1, 2011. Fresno State followed one year later, officially becoming a Mountain West member on July 1, 2012.

=== Mountain West era ===
In 2013, No. 25 Fresno State defeated Boise State 41–40 behind quarterback Derek Carr, snapping a seven-game losing streak to the Broncos. Carr threw for 460 yards and four touchdowns, and Fresno State scored the deciding touchdown with 2:14 remaining.

The Mountain West introduced two football divisions and a conference championship game beginning with the 2013 season. Boise State and Fresno State consequently did not meet every season, with no games played between the programs in 2015, 2016, 2019 or 2020.

The teams met twice in the same season on four occasions because of rematches in the Mountain West Championship Game: 2014, 2017, 2018 and 2022. Boise State defeated Fresno State in the 2014 and 2017 championship games, while Fresno State defeated Boise State for the conference title in 2018 and 2022. Conference championship meetings did not determine possession of the Milk Can, which remained tied to the regular-season matchup.

=== Pac-12 era ===
Boise State and Fresno State both became members of the Pac-12 in 2026. Their first meeting as Pac-12 opponents was played on October 10, 2026, in Fresno. No. 23 Boise State won 38–31, ending a three-game Fresno State winning streak in the series.

== Milk Can trophy ==
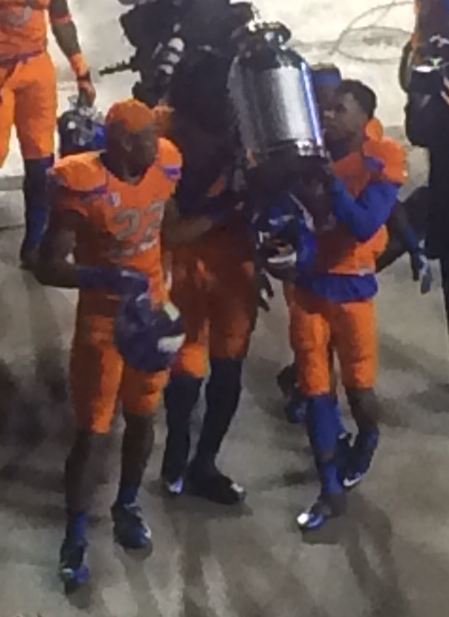
Boise State with the Milk Can in 2014

The Milk Can is a silver traveling trophy representing the dairy industries of California's Central Valley and Idaho. The trophy tradition was organized in 2005 by dairy interests connected with the two regions.

Although Fresno State's 27–7 victory in 2005 was recognized as the first result of the trophy series, the physical Milk Can was not completed in time for that game. It made its on-field debut following Boise State's 45–21 victory in 2006.

Unlike the overall football series, the Milk Can is contested only during regular-season meetings. The trophy therefore did not change hands following Mountain West Championship Game meetings in 2014, 2017, 2018 or 2022.

=== Replacement trophy ===
After Fresno State's 2023 victory, the university commissioned a replacement Milk Can. The change became widely noticed after Boise State regained the trophy with its 38–31 victory in 2026, when Boise State officials and fans observed that plaques commemorating the Broncos' previous victories were absent from the replacement.

Fresno State confirmed that the new trophy had been made following the 2023 game and that the original Milk Can, containing the earlier scores and roster plaques, remained intact at Fresno State. According to the university, the original trophy was retired because available space for additional plaques was becoming limited. The replacement initially displayed only Fresno State's 2023 and 2025 victories.

Boise State athletic director Jeramiah Dickey publicly remarked that the Broncos' previous wins appeared to have been removed from the trophy. Fresno State athletic director Garrett Klassy responded jokingly to Dickey on social media. Fresno State officials emphasized that the original trophy and its historical plaques had not been altered or destroyed.

== Game results ==
Boise State victories	Fresno State victories

No.	Date	Location	Winning team		Losing team	
1	September 17, 1977	Fresno, California	Fresno State	42	Boise State	7
2	September 8, 1984	Boise, Idaho	Fresno State	37	Boise State	21
3	November 2, 1996	Fresno, California	Fresno State	41	Boise State	7
4	October 19, 2001	Fresno, California	Boise State	35	Fresno State	30
5	October 18, 2002	Boise, Idaho	Boise State	67	Fresno State	21
6	November 21, 2003	Fresno, California	Boise State	31	Fresno State	17
7	October 23, 2004	Boise, Idaho	Boise State	33	Fresno State	16
8	November 10, 2005	Fresno, California	Fresno State	27	Boise State	7
9	November 1, 2006	Boise, Idaho	Boise State	45	Fresno State	21
10	October 26, 2007	Fresno, California	Boise State	34	Fresno State	21
11	November 28, 2008	Boise, Idaho	Boise State	61	Fresno State	10
12	September 18, 2009	Fresno, California	Boise State	51	Fresno State	34
13	November 19, 2010	Boise, Idaho	Boise State	51	Fresno State	0
14	October 7, 2011	Fresno, California	Boise State	57	Fresno State	7
15	October 13, 2012	Boise, Idaho	Boise State	20	Fresno State	10

No.	Date	Location	Winning team		Losing team	
16	September 20, 2013	Fresno, California	Fresno State	41	Boise State	40
17	October 17, 2014	Boise, Idaho	Boise State	37	Fresno State	27
18	December 6, 2014	Boise, Idaho	Boise State	28	Fresno State	14
19	November 25, 2017	Fresno, California	Fresno State	28	Boise State	17
20	December 2, 2017	Boise, Idaho	Boise State	17	Fresno State	14
21	November 9, 2018	Boise, Idaho	Boise State	24	Fresno State	17
22	December 1, 2018	Boise, Idaho	Fresno State	19	Boise State	16^{OT}
23	November 6, 2021	Fresno, California	Boise State	40	Fresno State	14
24	October 8, 2022	Boise, Idaho	Boise State	40	Fresno State	20
25	December 3, 2022	Boise, Idaho	Fresno State	28	Boise State	16
26	November 4, 2023	Fresno, California	Fresno State	37	Boise State	30
27	November 1, 2025	Boise, Idaho	Fresno State	30	Boise State	7
28	October 10, 2026	Fresno, California	Boise State	38	Fresno State	31
Series: Boise State leads 18–10Game results through October 10, 2026. Mountain West Championship Game meetings are included in the overall series record, but did not determine possession of the Milk Can.

== See also ==
- List of NCAA college football rivalry games
