= 2014 New Mexico Lobos football team =

American college football season

2014 New Mexico Lobos football
- Conference: Mountain West Conference
- Mountain Division
- Record: 4–8 (2–6 MW)
- Head coach: Bob Davie (3rd season)
- Offensive coordinator: Bob DeBesse (3rd season)
- Offensive scheme: Multiple pistol
- Defensive coordinator: Kevin Cosgrove (1st season)
- Base defense: 3–4
- Home stadium: University Stadium

2014 Mountain West Conference football standings
	Conf.			Overall
Team	W		L	W		L
Mountain Division
No. 16 Boise State x$	7	–	1	12	–	2
Colorado State	6	–	2	10	–	3
Utah State	6	–	2	10	–	4
Air Force	5	–	3	10	–	3
New Mexico	2	–	6	4	–	8
Wyoming	2	–	6	4	–	8
West Division
Fresno State x	5	–	3	6	–	8
San Diego State	5	–	3	7	–	6
Nevada	4	–	4	7	–	6
Hawaii	3	–	5	4	–	9
San Jose State	2	–	6	3	–	9
UNLV	1	–	7	2	–	11
Championship: Boise State 28, Fresno State 14
$ – Conference champion; x – Division champion/co-champions; Rankings from AP Poll

The 2014 New Mexico Lobos football team represented the University of New Mexico as a member of the Mountain Division in the Mountain West Conference (MW) during the 2014 NCAA Division I FBS football season. Led by third-year head coach Bob Davie, the Lobos compiled an overall record of 4–8 with a mark of 2–6 in conference play, tying for fifth place at the bottom of standings in the MW's Mountain Division. The team played home games at University Stadium in Albuquerque, New Mexico.

== Schedule ==
Date	Time	Opponent	Site	TV	Result	Attendance
August 30	6:00 p.m.	UTEP*	University Stadium; Albuquerque, NM	MW Net	L 24–31	25,802
September 6	5:00 p.m.	No. 17 Arizona State*	University Stadium; Albuquerque, NM	CBSSN	L 23–58	25,742
September 20	6:00 p.m.	at New Mexico State*	Aggie Memorial Stadium; Las Cruces, NM (Rio Grande Rivalry)	AV	W 38–35	24,651
September 26	6:00 p.m.	Fresno State^{†}	University Stadium; Albuquerque, NM	ESPN2	L 24–35	21,005
October 4	1:30 p.m.	at UTSA*	Alamodome; San Antonio, TX	ASN	W 21–9	30,419
October 10	7:30 p.m.	San Diego State	University Stadium; Albuquerque, NM	ESPNU	L 14–24	19,497
October 18	1:30 p.m.	at Air Force	Falcon Stadium; Colorado Springs, CO	RTRM	L 31–35	25,017
November 1	3:30 p.m.	at UNLV	Sam Boyd Stadium; Whitney, NV	RTRM	W 31–28	13,419
November 8	5:00 p.m.	Boise State	University Stadium; Albuquerque, NM	CBSSN	L 49–60	21,089
November 15	2:00 p.m.	at Utah State	Romney Stadium; Logan, UT	ESPNews	L 21–28	19,591
November 22	11:30 a.m.	at No. 22 Colorado State	Hughes Stadium; Fort Collins, CO	RTRM	L 20–58	22,131
November 29	1:30 p.m.	Wyoming	University Stadium; Albuquerque, NM	RTRM	W 36–30	18,489
*Non-conference game; ^{†}Homecoming; Rankings from AP Poll released prior to the game; All times are in Mountain time

== Game summaries ==
=== UTEP ===
	1	2	3	4	Total
Miners	14	10	0	7	31
Lobos	7	0	14	3	24

=== Arizona State ===
	1	2	3	4	Total
#17 Sun Devils	22	10	13	13	58
Lobos	7	14	0	2	23

=== At New Mexico State ===
	1	2	3	4	Total
Lobos	7	14	3	14	38
Aggies	0	14	14	7	35

=== Fresno State ===
	1	2	3	4	Total
Bulldogs	0	14	14	7	35
Lobos	3	14	7	0	24

=== At UTSA ===
	1	2	3	4	Total
Lobos	0	0	14	7	21
Roadrunners	0	3	6	0	9

=== San Diego State ===
	1	2	3	4	Total
Aztecs	3	7	14	0	24
Lobos	0	7	7	0	14

=== At Air Force ===
	1	2	3	4	Total
Lobos	7	14	7	3	31
Falcons	7	14	14	0	35

=== At UNLV ===
	1	2	3	4	Total
Lobos	7	10	0	14	31
Rebels	0	7	14	7	28

=== Boise State ===
	1	2	3	4	Total
Broncos	14	21	6	19	60
Lobos	28	14	7	0	49

=== At Utah State ===
	1	2	3	4	Total
Lobos	7	7	0	7	21
Aggies	7	14	7	0	28

=== At Colorado State ===
	1	2	3	4	Total
Lobos	0	7	6	7	20
#22 Rams	7	30	21	0	58

=== Wyoming ===
	1	2	3	4	Total
Cowboys	10	10	10	0	30
Lobos	14	7	15	0	36
