= Zach Vigil =

American football player (born 1991)

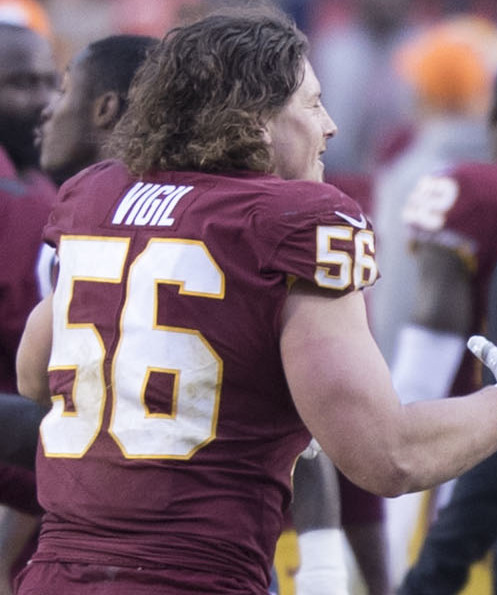
- Vigil with the Washington Redskins in 2017

No. 49, 59, 56
- Position: Linebacker

Personal information
- Born: March 28, 1991 (age 35); Clearfield, Utah, U.S.
- Listed height: 6 ft 2 in (1.88 m)
- Listed weight: 238 lb (108 kg)

Career information
- High school: Clearfield
- College: Utah State
- NFL draft: 2015: undrafted

Career history
- Miami Dolphins (2015–2016); Washington Redskins (2016); Buffalo Bills (2017)*; Washington Redskins (2017–2018)
- * Offseason or practice squad member only

Awards and highlights
- MW Defensive Player of the Year (2014); First-team All-MW (2014)

Career NFL statistics
- Total tackles: 89
- Fumble recoveries: 1
- Stats at Pro Football Reference

Zachary Vigil (born March 28, 1991) is an American former professional football player who was a linebacker in the National Football League (NFL). He played college football for the Utah State Aggies and was signed by the Miami Dolphins as an undrafted free agent in 2015.

== Professional career ==
Pre-draft measurables
Height	Weight	Arm length	Hand span	40-yard dash	10-yard split	20-yard split	20-yard shuttle	Three-cone drill	Vertical jump	Broad jump	Bench press
6 ft 2 in (1.88 m)	236 lb (107 kg)	32 1/2 in (0.83 m)	10 in (0.25 m)	4.68 s	1.57 s	2.71 s	4.41 s	7.11 s	32.0 in (0.81 m)	9 ft 5 in (2.87 m)	26 reps
All values from Pro Day

=== Miami Dolphins ===
Vigil was signed by the Miami Dolphins as an undrafted free agent in 2015. He made the 53-man roster as a rookie and played in all 16 regular-season games with two starts.

Vigil was placed on the Reserve/NFI list to start the 2016 season with a back injury. He was activated off the NFI list on November 5, 2016, prior to Week 9 of the 2016 season. He was released on December 19.

=== Washington Redskins (first stint) ===
On December 20, 2016, Vigil was claimed off waivers by the Washington Redskins. He was waived on September 2, 2017.

=== Buffalo Bills ===
On September 4, 2017, Vigil was signed to the Buffalo Bills' practice squad. He was released on October 31.

=== Washington Redskins (second stint) ===
On November 15, 2017, Vigil signed with the Redskins.

== Personal life ==
Vigil is the older brother of linebacker Nick Vigil. Both he and his brother initially pursued a career in bull riding until their father pushed the brothers into playing football after Zach suffered a major injury while bull riding. Vigil married his wife Kaitlin in 2017.
