= 2014 Air Force Falcons football team =

American college football season

2014 Air Force Falcons football

Famous Idaho Potato Bowl champion

Famous Idaho Potato Bowl, W 38–24 vs. Western Michigan
- Conference: Mountain West Conference
- Mountain Division
- Record: 10–3 (5–3 MW)
- Head coach: Troy Calhoun (8th season)
- Offensive coordinator: Mike Thiessen (6th season)
- Offensive scheme: Triple option
- Defensive coordinator: Steve Russ (3rd season)
- Base defense: 3–4
- Captains: Kale Pearson; Christian Spears; Michael Husar Jr.; Joey Nichol
- Home stadium: Falcon Stadium

2014 Mountain West Conference football standings
	Conf.			Overall
Team	W		L	W		L
Mountain Division
No. 16 Boise State x$	7	–	1	12	–	2
Colorado State	6	–	2	10	–	3
Utah State	6	–	2	10	–	4
Air Force	5	–	3	10	–	3
New Mexico	2	–	6	4	–	8
Wyoming	2	–	6	4	–	8
West Division
Fresno State x	5	–	3	6	–	8
San Diego State	5	–	3	7	–	6
Nevada	4	–	4	7	–	6
Hawaii	3	–	5	4	–	9
San Jose State	2	–	6	3	–	9
UNLV	1	–	7	2	–	11
Championship: Boise State 28, Fresno State 14
$ – Conference champion; x – Division champion/co-champions; Rankings from AP Poll

The 2014 Air Force Falcons football team represented the United States Air Force Academy as a member of the Mountain Division in the Mountain West Conference (MW) during the 2014 NCAA Division I FBS football season. Led by eighth-year head coach Troy Calhoun, the Falcons compiled an overall record of 10–3 with a mark of 5–3 in conference play, placing fourth in the MW's Mountain Division. Air Force was invited to the Famous Idaho Potato Bowl, where the Falcons defeated Western Michigan. The team played home games at Falcon Stadium in Colorado Springs, Colorado

== Schedule ==
Date	Time	Opponent	Site	TV	Result	Attendance
August 30	12:00 p.m.	Nicholls State*	Falcon Stadium; Colorado Springs, CO	ESPN3	W 44–16	32,038
September 6	8:15 p.m.	at Wyoming	War Memorial Stadium; Laramie, WY	ESPNU	L 13–17	21,246
September 13	12:00 p.m.	at Georgia State*	Georgia Dome; Atlanta, GA	ESPN3	W 48–38	16,836
September 27	5:00 p.m.	Boise State	Falcon Stadium; Colorado Springs, CO	CBSSN	W 28–14	30,012
October 4	1:30 p.m.	Navy*	Falcon Stadium; Colorado Springs, CO (Commander-in-Chief's Trophy)	CBSSN	W 30–21	37,731
October 11	8:15 p.m.	at Utah State	Romney Stadium; Logan, UT	ESPNU	L 16–34	24,037
October 18	1:30 p.m.	New Mexico	Falcon Stadium; Colorado Springs, CO	RTRM	W 35–31	25,017
November 1	9:30 a.m.	at Army*	Michie Stadium; West Point, NY (Commander-in-Chief's Trophy)	CBS	W 23–6	40,479
November 8	2:00 p.m.	at UNLV	Sam Boyd Stadium; Whitney, NV	themw.com	W 48–21	13,481
November 15	12:00 p.m.	Nevada	Falcon Stadium; Colorado Springs, CO	RTRM	W 45–38 ^{OT}	11,519
November 21	7:30 p.m.	at San Diego State	Qualcomm Stadium; San Diego, CA	CBSSN	L 14–30	28,626
November 28	1:30 p.m.	No. 21 Colorado State	Falcon Stadium; Colorado Springs, CO (rivalry)	CBSSN	W 27–24	32,650
December 20	3:45 p.m.	vs. Western Michigan*	Albertsons Stadium; Boise, ID (Famous Idaho Potato Bowl)	ESPN	W 38–24	18,223
*Non-conference game; Rankings from AP Poll released prior to the game; All times are in Mountain time

== Game summaries ==
=== Nicholls State ===
	1	2	3	4	Total
Colonels	6	3	0	7	16
Falcons	9	14	14	7	44

=== At Wyoming ===
	1	2	3	4	Total
Falcons	3	7	0	3	13
Cowboys	0	7	0	10	17

=== At Georgia State ===
	1	2	3	4	Total
Falcons	14	17	7	10	48
Panthers	0	10	14	14	38

=== Boise State ===
	1	2	3	4	Total
Broncos	0	0	0	14	14
Falcons	7	10	3	8	28

=== Navy ===
	1	2	3	4	Total
Midshipmen	7	7	0	7	21
Falcons	14	0	7	9	30

=== At Utah State ===
	1	2	3	4	Total
Falcons	3	3	7	3	16
Aggies	14	17	0	3	34

=== New Mexico ===
	1	2	3	4	Total
Lobos	7	14	7	3	31
Falcons	7	14	14	0	35

=== At Army ===
	1	2	3	4	Total
Falcons	0	6	10	7	23
Black Knights	3	0	3	0	6

=== At UNLV ===
	1	2	3	4	Total
Falcons	10	21	14	3	48
Rebels	7	7	7	0	21

=== Nevada ===
	1	2	3	4	OT	Total
Wolf Pack	0	14	7	17	0	38
Falcons	7	14	7	10	7	45

=== At San Diego State ===
	1	2	3	4	Total
Falcons	0	14	0	0	14
Aztecs	10	3	10	7	30

=== Colorado State ===
	1	2	3	4	Total
#21 Rams	10	0	7	7	24
Falcons	7	10	7	3	27

=== Western Michigan–Famous Idaho Potato Bowl ===
	1	2	3	4	Total
Broncos	3	7	0	14	24
Falcons	6	14	3	15	38

== Personnel ==
=== Coaching staff ===
Name	Position	Seasons at Air Force	Alma mater
Troy Calhoun	Head coach	7th	Air Force 1989
Steve Russ	Assistant head coach/co-defensive Coordinator	3rd	Air Force 1995
Matt Weikert	Outside linebackers coach/co-defensive Coordinator	8th	Ohio 2002
Mike Thiessen	Co-offensive coordinator/wide-receivers coach	6th	Air Force 2001
Clay Hendrix	Co-offensive coordinator/offensive line coach	8th	Furman 1986
Blane Morgan	Quarterbacks coach	7th	Air Force 1999
Ron Vanderlinden	Linebackers coach	1st	Albion College
Jake Campbell	Assistant backfield coach	3rd	Air Force 1996
Tim Cross	Defensive line coach	3rd	Northern Colorado
Capt. Drew Fowler	Assistant linebackers	1st	Air Force
Ben Miller	Running backs/special teams coordinator	5th	Air Force 2002
Jake Moreland	Tight ends	3rd	Western Michigan 2000
Lt. Col. Steve Pipes	Assistant defensive line	3rd	Air Force 1998
John Rudzinski	Recruiting coordinator/secondary coach	5th	Air Force 2005
Steve Senn	Executive Asst./quality control	11th	Air Force 1990
Janel Mitchell	Administrative Assistant	1st	Northwestern Oklahoma State University 2013
Scott Richardson	Equipment Supervisor/Head Football Equipment Manager	2nd	University of Kansas 2006
Erick Kozlowski	Head of Football Training	12th	New Mexico 1989
Mark Peters	Athletic Football Trainer	2nd	Waldorf College 1996
Ernie Sedelmyer	Athletic Football Trainer	1st	Penn State University 1992
