= 2014 Colorado State Rams football team =

American college football season

2014 Colorado State Rams football
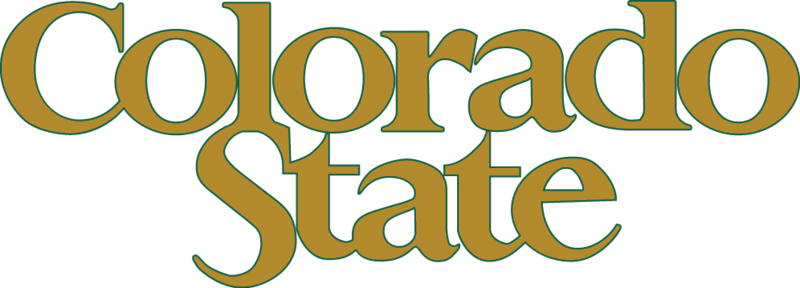

Las Vegas Bowl, L 10–45 vs. Utah
- Conference: Mountain West Conference
- Mountain Division
- Record: 10–3 (6–2 MW)
- Head coach: Jim McElwain (3rd season; regular season); Dave Baldwin (interim; bowl game)
- Offensive coordinator: Dave Baldwin (3rd season)
- Offensive scheme: Multiple
- Co-defensive coordinators: Marty English (3rd season); Al Simmons (3rd season)
- Base defense: 4–3
- Home stadium: Sonny Lubick Field at Hughes Stadium

2014 Mountain West Conference football standings
| | Conf. | | | Overall |
| Team | W | | L | W | | L |
|---|---|---|---|---|---|---|
Mountain Division
| No. 16 Boise State x$ | 7 | – | 1 | 12 | – | 2 |
| Colorado State | 6 | – | 2 | 10 | – | 3 |
| Utah State | 6 | – | 2 | 10 | – | 4 |
| Air Force | 5 | – | 3 | 10 | – | 3 |
| New Mexico | 2 | – | 6 | 4 | – | 8 |
| Wyoming | 2 | – | 6 | 4 | – | 8 |
West Division
| Fresno State x | 5 | – | 3 | 6 | – | 8 |
| San Diego State | 5 | – | 3 | 7 | – | 6 |
| Nevada | 4 | – | 4 | 7 | – | 6 |
| Hawaii | 3 | – | 5 | 4 | – | 9 |
| San Jose State | 2 | – | 6 | 3 | – | 9 |
| UNLV | 1 | – | 7 | 2 | – | 11 |
Championship: Boise State 28, Fresno State 14
$ – Conference champion; x – Division champion/co-champions; Rankings from AP Poll

The 2014 Colorado State Rams football team represented Colorado State University in the 2014 NCAA Division I FBS football season. The Rams were led by third-year head coach Jim McElwain and played their home games at Sonny Lubick Field at Hughes Stadium. They were members of the Mountain Division of the Mountain West Conference. They finished the season 10–3, 6–2 in Mountain West play to finish in a tie for second place in the Mountain Division. They were invited to the Las Vegas Bowl where they lost to Utah 45–10.

At the end of the regular season, McElwain resigned to take the same position at Florida. Offensive coordinator Dave Baldwin was the interim head coach for the Las Vegas Bowl.

== Schedule ==
| Date | Time | Opponent | Rank | Site | TV | Result | Attendance |
|---|---|---|---|---|---|---|---|
| August 29 | 7:00 p.m. | vs. Colorado* | | Sports Authority Field at Mile High; Denver, CO (Rocky Mountain Showdown) | FS1 | W 31–17 | 63,363 |
| September 6 | 8:15 p.m. | at Boise State | | Albertsons Stadium; Boise, ID | ESPN2 | L 24–37 | 34,910 |
| September 13 | 1:00 p.m. | UC Davis* | | Hughes Stadium; Fort Collins, CO | MWN | W 49–21 | 21,202 |
| September 27 | 10:30 a.m. | at Boston College* | | Alumni Stadium; Chestnut Hill, MA | ACCRSN | W 24–21 | 33,632 |
| October 4 | 1:00 p.m. | Tulsa* | | Hughes Stadium; Fort Collins, CO | MWN | W 42–17 | 25,806 |
| October 11 | 8:30 p.m. | at Nevada | | Mackay Stadium; Reno, NV | CBSSN | W 31–24 | 21,847 |
| October 18 | 5:00 p.m. | Utah State^{†} | | Hughes Stadium; Fort Collins, CO | CBSSN | W 16–13 | 32,546 |
| October 25 | 5:00 p.m. | Wyoming | | Hughes Stadium; Fort Collins, CO (Battle for the Bronze Boot) | RTRM | W 45–31 | 32,529 |
| November 1 | 5:00 p.m. | at San Jose State | | Spartan Stadium; San Jose, CA | CBSSN | W 38–31 | 17,887 |
| November 8 | 5:00 p.m. | Hawaii | | Hughes Stadium; Fort Collins, CO | ESPNU | W 49–22 | 25,236 |
| November 22 | 11:30 a.m. | New Mexico | No. 22 | Hughes Stadium; Fort Collins, CO | RTRM | W 58–20 | 22,131 |
| November 28 | 1:30 p.m. | at Air Force | No. 21 | Falcon Stadium; Colorado Springs, CO (Battle for the Ram–Falcon Trophy) | CBSSN | L 24–27 | 32,650 |
| December 20 | 1:30 p.m. | vs. No. 23 Utah* | | Sam Boyd Stadium; Whitney, NV (Las Vegas Bowl) | ABC | L 10–45 | 33,067 |
*Non-conference game; ^{†}Homecoming; Rankings from AP Poll released prior to game; All times are in Mountain time

== Rankings ==
Ranking movements Legend: ██ Increase in ranking ██ Decrease in ranking — = Not ranked RV = Received votes
| | Week | | | | | | | | | | | | | | | | |
| Poll | Pre | 1 | 2 | 3 | 4 | 5 | 6 | 7 | 8 | 9 | 10 | 11 | 12 | 13 | 14 | 15 | Final |
|---|---|---|---|---|---|---|---|---|---|---|---|---|---|---|---|---|---|
| AP | — | — | — | — | — | — | — | RV | RV | RV | RV | 23 | 22 | 21 | RV | RV | RV |
| Coaches | — | RV | — | — | — | — | — | RV | RV | RV | RV | 25 | 23 | 21 | RV | RV | — |
| CFP | Not released | | | | | | | | | — | — | — | — | — | — | — | Not released |

== Game summaries ==
=== vs Colorado ===
| | 1 | 2 | 3 | 4 | Total |
|---|---|---|---|---|---|
| Rams | 0 | 7 | 7 | 17 | 31 |
| Buffaloes | 7 | 3 | 7 | 0 | 17 |

=== At Boise State ===
| | 1 | 2 | 3 | 4 | Total |
|---|---|---|---|---|---|
| Rams | 10 | 0 | 0 | 14 | 24 |
| Broncos | 13 | 17 | 7 | 0 | 37 |

=== UC Davis ===
| | 1 | 2 | 3 | 4 | Total |
|---|---|---|---|---|---|
| Aggies | 7 | 0 | 0 | 14 | 21 |
| Rams | 21 | 7 | 0 | 21 | 49 |

=== At Boston College ===
| | 1 | 2 | 3 | 4 | Total |
|---|---|---|---|---|---|
| Rams | 0 | 7 | 7 | 10 | 24 |
| Eagles | 0 | 14 | 7 | 0 | 21 |

=== Tulsa ===
| | 1 | 2 | 3 | 4 | Total |
|---|---|---|---|---|---|
| Golden Hurricane | 0 | 7 | 3 | 7 | 17 |
| Rams | 14 | 14 | 7 | 7 | 42 |

=== At Nevada ===
| | 1 | 2 | 3 | 4 | Total |
|---|---|---|---|---|---|
| Rams | 0 | 17 | 14 | 0 | 31 |
| Wolf Pack | 0 | 3 | 7 | 14 | 24 |

=== Utah State ===
| | 1 | 2 | 3 | 4 | Total |
|---|---|---|---|---|---|
| Aggies | 10 | 0 | 0 | 3 | 13 |
| Rams | 7 | 3 | 0 | 6 | 16 |

=== Wyoming ===
| | 1 | 2 | 3 | 4 | Total |
|---|---|---|---|---|---|
| Cowboys | 3 | 0 | 7 | 21 | 31 |
| Rams | 10 | 14 | 14 | 7 | 45 |

=== At San Jose State ===
| | 1 | 2 | 3 | 4 | Total |
|---|---|---|---|---|---|
| Rams | 7 | 10 | 7 | 14 | 38 |
| Spartans | 7 | 7 | 3 | 14 | 31 |

=== Hawaii ===
| | 1 | 2 | 3 | 4 | Total |
|---|---|---|---|---|---|
| Rams | 14 | 14 | 14 | 7 | 49 |
| Rainbow Warriors | 5 | 3 | 14 | 0 | 22 |

=== New Mexico ===
| | 1 | 2 | 3 | 4 | Total |
|---|---|---|---|---|---|
| Lobos | 0 | 7 | 6 | 7 | 20 |
| No. 22 Rams | 7 | 30 | 21 | 0 | 58 |

=== At Air Force ===
| | 1 | 2 | 3 | 4 | Total |
|---|---|---|---|---|---|
| No. 21 Rams | 10 | 0 | 7 | 7 | 24 |
| Falcons | 7 | 10 | 7 | 3 | 27 |

=== Utah–Las Vegas Bowl ===
| | 1 | 2 | 3 | 4 | Total |
|---|---|---|---|---|---|
| Rams | 10 | 0 | 0 | 0 | 10 |
| No. 23 Utes | 21 | 3 | 7 | 14 | 45 |

== Players in the 2015 NFL draft ==
| Player | Position | Round | Pick | NFL club |
| Ty Sambrailo | T | 2 | 59 | Denver Broncos |
| Garrett Grayson | QB | 3 | 75 | New Orleans Saints |
