= 2014 Boise State Broncos football team =

American college football season

2014 Boise State Broncos football

Mountain West champion MW Mountain Division champion Fiesta Bowl champion

Mountain West Championship Game, W 28–14 vs. Fresno State

Fiesta Bowl, W 38–30 vs. Arizona
- Conference: Mountain West Conference
- Mountain Division

Ranking
- Coaches: No. 16
- AP: No. 16
- Record: 12–2 (7–1 MW)
- Head coach: Bryan Harsin (1st season)
- Offensive coordinator: Mike Sanford Jr. (1st season)
- Offensive scheme: Multiple
- Defensive coordinator: Marcel Yates (1st season)
- Base defense: Multiple
- Home stadium: Albertsons Stadium

2014 Mountain West Conference football standings
	Conf.			Overall
Team	W		L	W		L
Mountain Division
No. 16 Boise State x$	7	–	1	12	–	2
Colorado State	6	–	2	10	–	3
Utah State	6	–	2	10	–	4
Air Force	5	–	3	10	–	3
New Mexico	2	–	6	4	–	8
Wyoming	2	–	6	4	–	8
West Division
Fresno State x	5	–	3	6	–	8
San Diego State	5	–	3	7	–	6
Nevada	4	–	4	7	–	6
Hawaii	3	–	5	4	–	9
San Jose State	2	–	6	3	–	9
UNLV	1	–	7	2	–	11
Championship: Boise State 28, Fresno State 14
$ – Conference champion; x – Division champion/co-champions; Rankings from AP Poll

The 2014 Boise State Broncos football team represented Boise State University in the 2014 NCAA Division I FBS football season. The Broncos were led by first-year head coach Bryan Harsin and played their home games at Albertsons Stadium. They were members of the Mountain West Conference in the Mountain Division. They finished the season 12–2, 7–1 in Mountain West play to win the Mountain Division championship. They defeated West Division champion Fresno State in the Mountain West Championship Game to become Mountain West champions. As the highest ranked team from the "Group of five", they received an automatic bid to a New Year's Six bowl. They were invited to the Fiesta Bowl where they defeated Arizona. It was the Broncos third appearance and victory in the Fiesta Bowl.

== Schedule ==
Date	Time	Opponent	Rank	Site	TV	Result	Attendance
August 28	6:00 p.m.	vs. No. 18 Ole Miss*		Georgia Dome; Atlanta, GA (Chick-fil-A Kickoff Game)	ESPN	L 13–35	32,823
September 6	8:15 p.m.	Colorado State		Albertsons Stadium; Boise, ID	ESPN2	W 37–24	34,910
September 13	10:00 a.m.	at UConn*		Rentschler Field; East Hartford, CT	ABC/ESPN2	W 38–21	30,098
September 20	8:30 p.m.	Louisiana–Lafayette*^{†}		Albertsons Stadium; Boise, ID	CBSSN	W 34–9	33,337
September 27	5:00 p.m.	at Air Force		Falcon Stadium; Colorado Springs, CO	CBSSN	L 14–28	30,012
October 4	8:30 p.m.	at Nevada		Mackay Stadium; Reno, NV (rivalry)	CBSSN	W 51–46	32,327
October 17	6:00 p.m.	Fresno State		Albertsons Stadium; Boise, ID (Battle for the Milk Can)	ESPN	W 37–27	35,008
October 24	7:00 p.m.	BYU*		Albertsons Stadium; Boise, ID	ESPN	W 55–30	36,752
November 8	5:00 p.m.	at New Mexico		University Stadium; Albuquerque, NM	CBSSN	W 60–49	21,089
November 15	8:15 p.m.	San Diego State		Albertsons Stadium; Boise, ID	ESPNU	W 38–29	27,478
November 22	8:15 p.m.	at Wyoming		War Memorial Stadium; Laramie, WY	ESPN2	W 63–14	15,821
November 29	8:15 p.m.	Utah State	No. 23	Albertsons Stadium; Boise, ID	ESPN2	W 50–19	33,940
December 6	8:00 p.m.	Fresno State	No. 22	Albertsons Stadium; Boise, ID (MWC Championship Game)	CBS	W 28–14	26,101
December 31	2:00 p.m.	vs. No. 10 Arizona*	No. 20	University of Phoenix Stadium; Glendale, AZ (Fiesta Bowl)	ESPN	W 38–30	66,896
*Non-conference game; ^{†}Homecoming; Rankings from AP Poll and CFP Rankings after October 28 released prior to game; All times are in Mountain time

Schedule source:

== Game summaries ==
=== Vs. Ole Miss ===
	1	2	3	4	Total
No. 19 Rebels	7	0	0	28	35
Broncos	0	3	3	7	13

Uniform Combination
Helmet	Jersey	Pants

=== Colorado State ===
	1	2	3	4	Total
Rams	10	0	0	14	24
Broncos	13	17	7	0	37

Uniform Combination
Helmet	Jersey	Pants

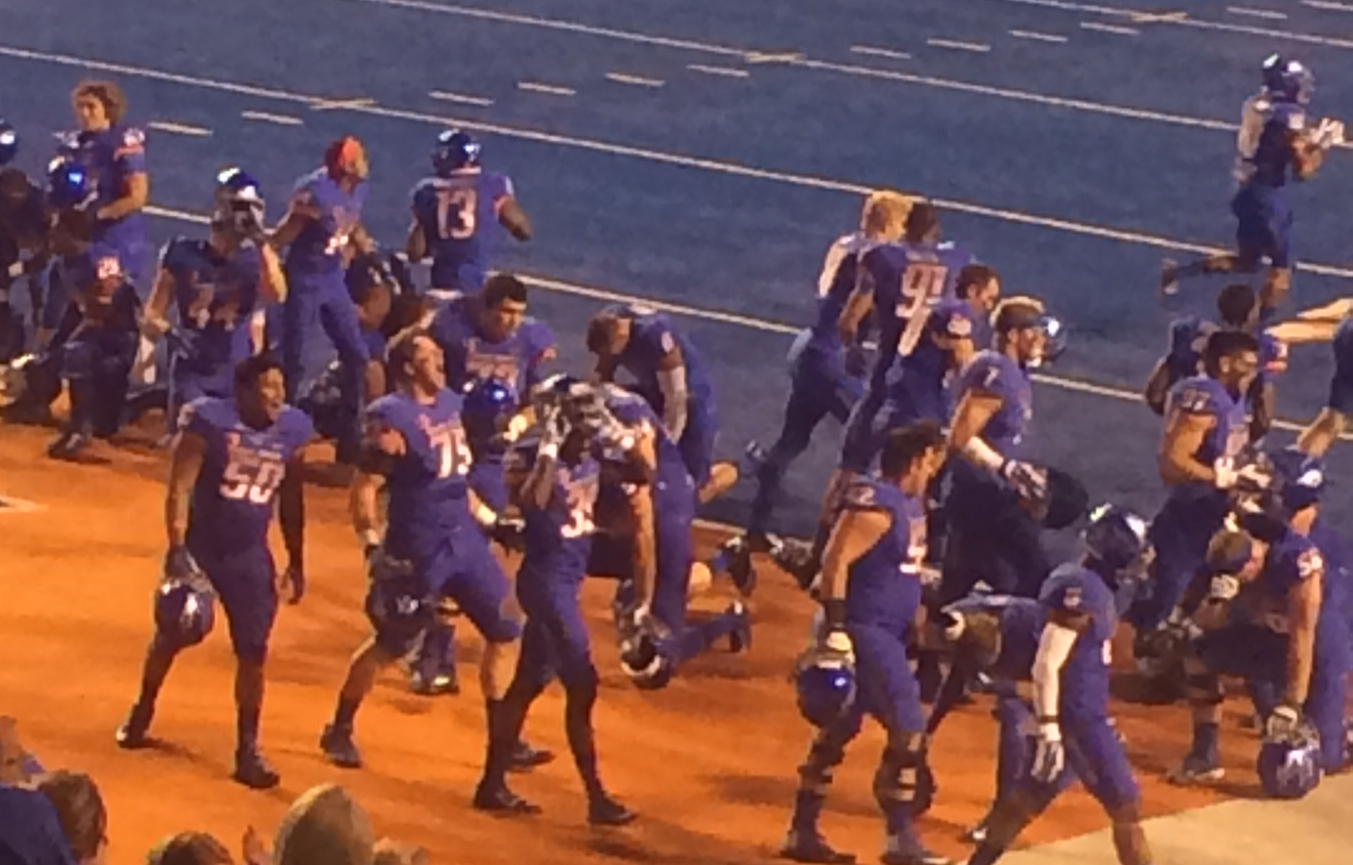
Boise State players during pregame.

=== At UConn ===
	1	2	3	4	Total
Broncos	7	14	3	14	38
Huskies	3	7	11	0	21

Uniform Combination
Helmet	Jersey	Pants

The first meeting between the two schools ended with Boise taking the win. Boise State would take the early lead with a fumble recovery from Tanner Vallejo for a touchdown. Boise State would trail in the second quarter 7–10, but Boise State QB Grant Hedrick would throw a touchdown pass to Matt Miller to take the lead again. UConn would close the gap to 3 points in the third quarter and headed into the fourth quarter trailing by 3, but Jonathan Moxey made a key fourth quarter interception, stepping in front of UConn's Deshon Foxx at the UConn 37-yard line. That led to a 9-yard touchdown pass from Hedrick to Miller in the back of the end zone. Boise State would get their second interception with four minutes left in the fourth quarter, this time by Donte Deayon who ripped the ball from receiver Geremy Davis and ran 50 yards down the right sideline for the score thus sealing a 38–21 Boise State victory.

=== Louisiana–Lafayette ===
	1	2	3	4	Total
Ragin' Cajuns	3	0	0	6	9
Broncos	14	7	10	3	34

Uniform Combination
Helmet	Jersey	Pants

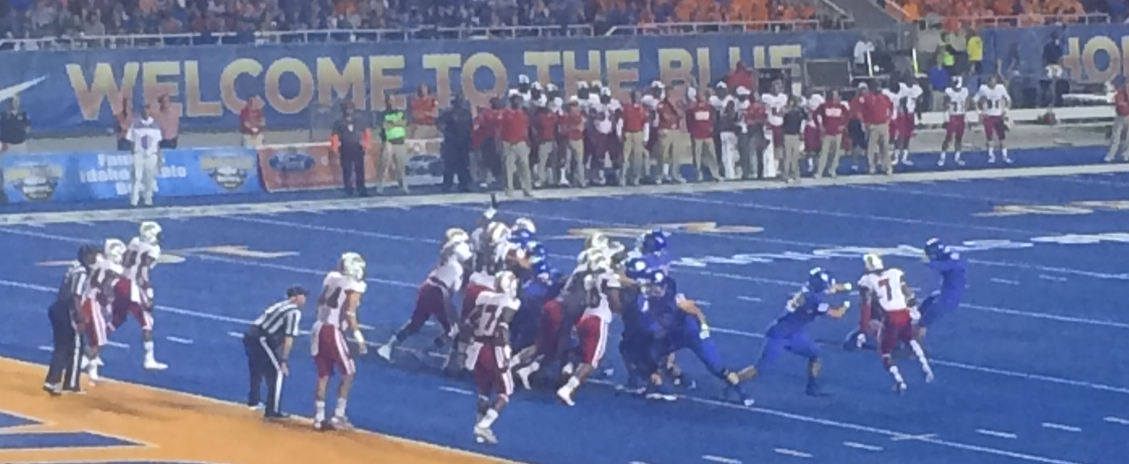
Boise State kicking an extra point.

=== At Air Force ===
	1	2	3	4	Total
Broncos	0	0	0	14	14
Falcons	7	10	3	8	28

Uniform Combination
Helmet	Jersey	Pants

=== At Nevada ===
	1	2	3	4	Total
Broncos	13	17	14	7	51
Wolf Pack	7	14	8	17	46

Uniform Combination
Helmet	Jersey	Pants

=== Fresno State ===
	1	2	3	4	Total
Bulldogs	10	0	17	0	27
Broncos	13	7	7	10	37

Uniform Combination
Helmet	Jersey	Pants

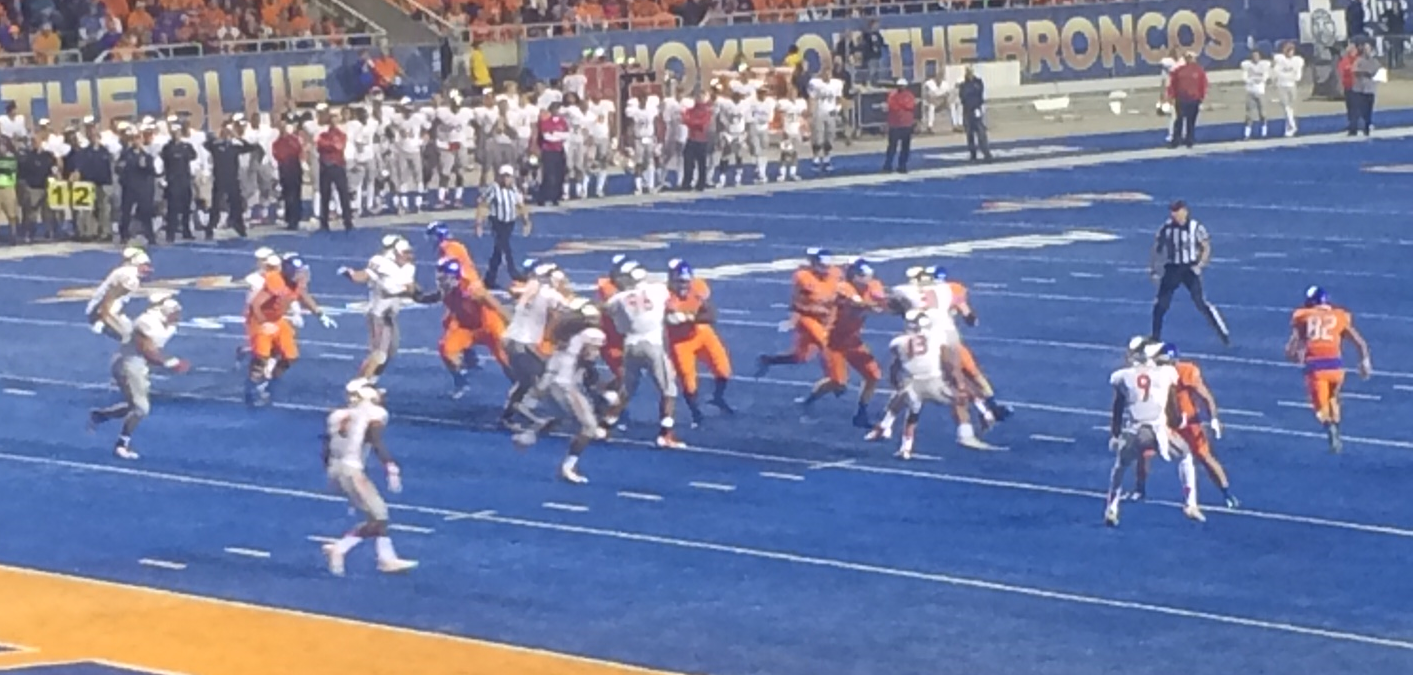
Boise State during a play in which they scored a TD in the 4th quarter.

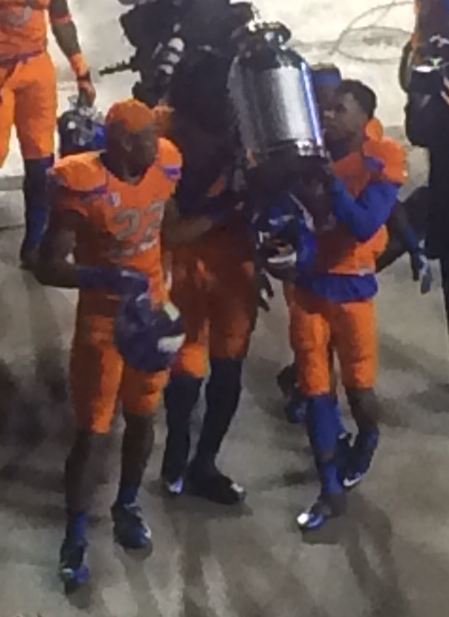
Boise State players celebrate with the Milk Can.

=== BYU ===
	1	2	3	4	Total
Cougars	0	16	7	7	30
Broncos	10	31	7	7	55

Uniform Combination
Helmet	Jersey	Pants

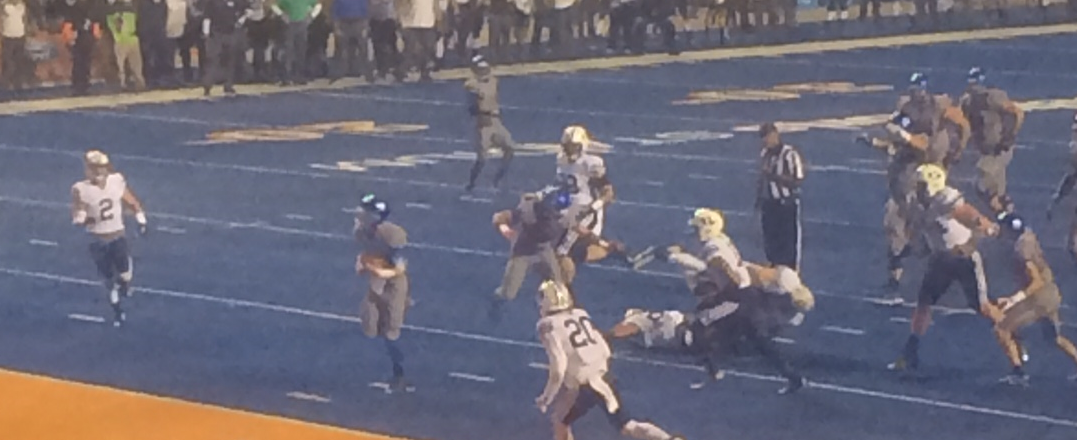
QB Grant Hedrick scoring a 1st quarter TD.

=== At New Mexico ===
	1	2	3	4	Total
Broncos	14	21	6	19	60
Lobos	28	14	7	0	49

Uniform Combination
Helmet	Jersey	Pants

=== San Diego State ===
	1	2	3	4	Total
Aztecs	10	10	3	6	29
Broncos	0	10	7	21	38

Uniform Combination
Helmet	Jersey	Pants

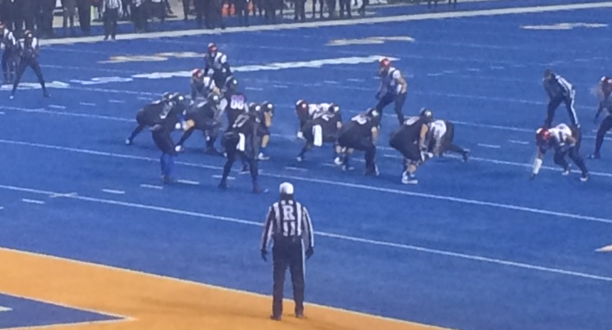
Boise State on offense.

=== At Wyoming ===
	1	2	3	4	Total
Broncos	14	14	28	7	63
Cowboys	0	7	0	7	14

Uniform Combination
Helmet	Jersey	Pants

=== Utah State ===
	1	2	3	4	Total
Aggies	9	3	0	7	19
No. 25 Broncos	20	14	0	16	50

Uniform Combination
Helmet	Jersey	Pants

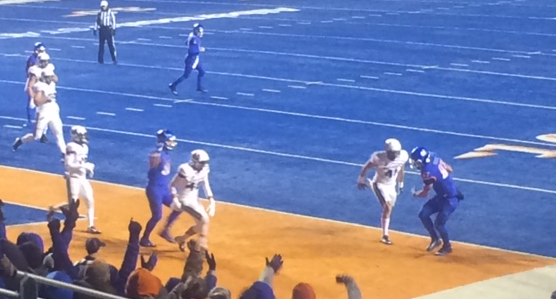
TE Alec Dhaenens catches a 1st quarter TD.

=== Fresno State–Mountain West Championship Game ===
	1	2	3	4	Total
Bulldogs	0	0	7	7	14
No. 22 Broncos	14	7	7	0	28

Uniform Combination
Helmet	Jersey	Pants

=== Arizona–Fiesta Bowl ===
	1	2	3	4	Total
No. 21 Broncos	21	10	0	7	38
No. 11 Wildcats	7	10	3	10	30

Uniform Combination
Helmet	Jersey	Pants

== Rankings ==
Ranking movements Legend: ██ Increase in ranking ██ Decrease in ranking — = Not ranked RV = Received votes
	Week																
Poll	Pre	1	2	3	4	5	6	7	8	9	10	11	12	13	14	15	Final
AP	RV	—	—	—	—	—	—	—	—	—	—	RV	RV	25	22	21	16
Coaches	RV	RV	RV	RV	RV	—	—	—	—	RV	RV	RV	RV	25	22	21	16
CFP	Not released									—	—	—	—	23	22	20	Not released

== Statistics ==
=== Scores by quarter ===
	1	2	3	4	Total
Boise State	153	172	106	125	556
Opponents	101	91	73	110	375
