= 2014 Hawaii Rainbow Warriors football team =

American college football season

2014 Hawaii Rainbow Warriors football
- Conference: Mountain West Conference
- West Division
- Record: 4–9 (3–5 MW)
- Head coach: Norm Chow (3rd season)
- Offensive scheme: Pro spread
- Defensive coordinator: Kevin Clune (1st season)
- Base defense: 3–4 hybrid
- Home stadium: Aloha Stadium

2014 Mountain West Conference football standings
	Conf.			Overall
Team	W		L	W		L
Mountain Division
No. 16 Boise State x$	7	–	1	12	–	2
Colorado State	6	–	2	10	–	3
Utah State	6	–	2	10	–	4
Air Force	5	–	3	10	–	3
New Mexico	2	–	6	4	–	8
Wyoming	2	–	6	4	–	8
West Division
Fresno State x	5	–	3	6	–	8
San Diego State	5	–	3	7	–	6
Nevada	4	–	4	7	–	6
Hawaii	3	–	5	4	–	9
San Jose State	2	–	6	3	–	9
UNLV	1	–	7	2	–	11
Championship: Boise State 28, Fresno State 14
$ – Conference champion; x – Division champion/co-champions; Rankings from AP Poll

The 2014 Hawaii Rainbow Warriors football team represented the University of Hawaiʻi at Mānoa in the 2014 NCAA Division I FBS football season. The team was led by third-year head coach Norm Chow and played their home games at Aloha Stadium. They were members of the Mountain West Conference in the West Division. They finished the season 4–9, 3–5 in Mountain West play to finish in fourth place in the West Division.

== Schedule ==
Date	Time	Opponent	Site	TV	Result	Attendance
August 30	4:30 pm	No. 25 Washington*	Aloha Stadium; Honolulu, HI	CBSSN	L 16–17	36,411
September 6	4:30 pm	Oregon State*	Aloha Stadium; Honolulu, HI	CBSSN	L 30–38	29,050
September 13	6:00 pm	No. 10 (FCS) Northern Iowa*	Aloha Stadium; Honolulu, HI	Oceanic PPV	W 27–24	24,999
September 20	9:00 am	at Colorado*	Folsom Field; Boulder, CO	P12N	L 12–21	39,478
October 4	2:00 pm	at Rice*	Rice Stadium; Houston, TX	ASN	L 14–28	17,465
October 11	6:00 pm	Wyoming	Aloha Stadium; Honolulu, HI (Paniolo Trophy)	Oceanic PPV	W 38–28	20,495
October 18	5:30 pm	at San Diego State	Qualcomm Stadium; San Diego, CA	CBSSN	L 10–20	35,686
October 25	6:00 pm	Nevada^{†}	Aloha Stadium; Honolulu, HI	Oceanic PPV	L 18–26	27,061
November 1	5:00 pm	Utah State	Aloha Stadium; Honolulu, HI	Oceanic PPV	L 14–35	19,799
November 8	2:00 pm	at Colorado State	Hughes Stadium; Fort Collins, CO	ESPNU	L 22–49	25,236
November 15	11:30 am	at San Jose State	Spartan Stadium; San Jose, CA (rivalry)	Oceanic PPV	W 13–0	17,962
November 22	6:00 pm	UNLV	Aloha Stadium; Honolulu, HI	Oceanic PPV	W 37–35	25,604
November 29	2:00 pm	at Fresno State	Bulldog Stadium; Fresno, CA (rivalry)	Oceanic PPV	L 21–28	32,580
*Non-conference game; ^{†}Homecoming; Rankings from AP Poll released prior to game; All times are in Hawaii time

Schedule source:

== Projected depth chart ==
Defense

FS
Trayvon Henderson
Marrell Jackson
⋅

WLB	ILB	ILB	SLB
T. J. Taimatuia	Simon Poti	Tavita Lataimua	⋅
Jeremy Castro	Julian Gener	Benetton Fonua	⋅
⋅	⋅	⋅	⋅

SS
Taz Stevenson
Michael Martin
⋅

CB
Dee Maggitt
Nick Nelson
Jalen Rogers

DE	NT	DE
Kennedy Tulimasealii	Moses Samia	Beau Yap
Niko Uti	Marcus Malepeai	Luke Shawley
Haani Tulimaiau	Calen Friel	⋅

CB
Ne'Quan Phillips
Jerrell Jackson
Jamal Mayo

Offense

WR
Marcus Kemp
Ammon Barker
Vasquez Haynes

LT	LG	C	RG	RT
Ben Clarke	Dejon Allen	Kody Afusia	Dave Lefotu	Sean Shigematsu
Leo Koloamatangi	John Wa'a	Brenden Urban	Frank Lloyd Jr.	R. J. Hollis
⋅	⋅	⋅	⋅	⋅

TE
Harold Moleni
Jordan Pu'u-Robinson
Metuisela Unga

WR
Scott Harding
Quinton Pedroza
Donnie King Jr.

QB
Ikaika Woolsey
Jeremy Higgins
Taylor Graham

RB
Joey Iosefa
Steven Lakalaka
Diocemy Saint Juste

FB
Justin Vele
⋅
⋅

Special teams
PK Tyler Hadden
P Scott Harding
KR Diocemy Saint Juste
PR Scott Harding
LS Brodie Nakama
