= 2014 UNLV Rebels football team =

American college football season

2014 UNLV Rebels football
- Conference: Mountain West Conference
- West Division
- Record: 2–11 (1–7 MW)
- Head coach: Bobby Hauck (5th season)
- Offensive coordinator: Timm Rosenbach (2nd season)
- Defensive coordinator: Tim Hauck (2nd season)
- Home stadium: Sam Boyd Stadium

2014 Mountain West Conference football standings
	Conf.			Overall
Team	W		L	W		L
Mountain Division
No. 16 Boise State x$	7	–	1	12	–	2
Colorado State	6	–	2	10	–	3
Utah State	6	–	2	10	–	4
Air Force	5	–	3	10	–	3
New Mexico	2	–	6	4	–	8
Wyoming	2	–	6	4	–	8
West Division
Fresno State x	5	–	3	6	–	8
San Diego State	5	–	3	7	–	6
Nevada	4	–	4	7	–	6
Hawaii	3	–	5	4	–	9
San Jose State	2	–	6	3	–	9
UNLV	1	–	7	2	–	11
Championship: Boise State 28, Fresno State 14
$ – Conference champion; x – Division champion/co-champions; Rankings from AP Poll

The 2014 UNLV Rebels football team represented the University of Nevada, Las Vegas (UNLV) as a member of the Mountain West Conference (MW) during the 2014 NCAA Division I FBS football season. Led by Bobby Hauck in his fifth and final season as head coach, the Rebels compiled an overall record of 2–11 record with mark of 1–7 in conference play, placing last out of six teams in the MW's West Division. The team played home games at Sam Boyd Stadium in Whitney, Nevada.

Hauck resigned at the end of the season. He posted a record of 15–49 in five seasons, leading the Rebels to a bowl game in 2013, the program's first since 2000.

== Schedule ==
Date	Time	Opponent	Site	TV	Result	Attendance
August 29	7:30 p.m.	at Arizona*	Arizona Stadium; Tucson, AZ	ESPN	L 13–58	50,103
September 6	7:00 p.m.	Northern Colorado*	Sam Boyd Stadium; Whitney, NV		W 13–12	17,289
September 13	4:00 p.m.	Northern Illinois*	Sam Boyd Stadium; Whitney, NV	MWN	L 34–48	14,305
September 20	5:00 p.m.	at Houston*	TDECU Stadium; Houston, TX	ESPN3	L 14–47	23,408
September 27	5:00 p.m.	at San Diego State	Qualcomm Stadium; San Diego, CA	ESPN3	L 17–34	28,005
October 4	5:00 p.m.	at San Jose State	Spartan Stadium; San Jose, CA	ESPNews	L 10–33	14,427
October 10	7:00 p.m.	Fresno State^{†}	Sam Boyd Stadium; Whitney, NV	CBSSN	W 30–27 ^{OT}	15,398
October 25	1:00 p.m.	at Utah State	Romney Stadium; Logan, UT	ESPNews	L 20–34	20,153
November 1	2:30 p.m.	New Mexico	Sam Boyd Stadium; Whitney, NV	RTRM	L 28–31	13,419
November 8	1:00 p.m.	Air Force	Sam Boyd Stadium; Whitney, NV	MWN	L 21–48	13,481
November 15	4:00 p.m.	at BYU*	LaVell Edwards Stadium; Provo, UT	ESPNU, BYUtv	L 23–42	53,622
November 22	8:00 p.m.	at Hawaii	Aloha Stadium; Halawa, HI	MWN	L 35–37	25,604
November 29	7:30 p.m.	Nevada	Sam Boyd Stadium; Whitney, NV (Fremont Cannon)	ESPNU	L 27–49	20,151
*Non-conference game; ^{†}Homecoming; All times are in Pacific time

== Game summaries ==
=== At Arizona ===
UNLV at Arizona

Team	1	2	3	4	Total
Rebels	0	6	7	0	13
• Wildcats	14	10	24	10	58

- Date: August 29, 2014
- Location: Arizona Stadium
  Tucson, AZ
- Game start: 7:30 p.m. PDT
- Elapsed time: 3 hours and 34 minutes
- Game attendance: 50,103
- Game weather: Temperature: 93 °F (34 °C) • Wind: 3 MPH N • Weather: Clear
- Referee: Cooper Castleberry
- TV announcers (ESPN): Mark Neely, Mike Bellotti, and Dawn Davenport (sideline)

In their first game of the season, the Rebels lost, 58–13 to the Arizona Wildcats.

Scoring summary

Quarter	Time	Drive			Team	Scoring information	Score	
Quarter	Time	Plays	Yards	TOP	Team	Scoring information	UNLV	Arizona
1	1:40	3	96	0:38	Arizona	Nate Phillips 39-yard touchdown reception from Anu Solomon, Casey Skowron kick good	0	7
1	0:13	3	66	0:40	Arizona	Samajie Grant 63-yard touchdown reception from Anu Solomon, Casey Skowron kick good	0	14
2	12:22	6	51	2:51	UNLV	41-yard field goal by Jonathan Leiva	3	14
2	5:52	11	67	2:51	Arizona	28-yard field goal by Casey Skowron	3	17
2	3:08	7	44	2:44	UNLV	48-yard field goal by Nicolai Bornand	6	17
2	0:50	8	65	2:18	Arizona	DaVonte' Neal 13-yard touchdown reception from Anu Solomon, Casey Skowron kick good	6	24
3	14:40	1	92	0:14	Arizona	Austin Hill 92-yard touchdown reception from Anu Solomon, Casey Skowron kick good	6	31
3	12:14	6	75	2:26	UNLV	Anthony Williams 2-yard touchdown reception from Blake Decker, Jonathan Leiva kick good	13	31
3	8:48	11	75	3:26	Arizona	Terris Jones-Grigsby 2-yard touchdown run, Casey Skowron kick good	13	38
3	2:36	9	24	2:54	Arizona	49-yard field goal by Casey Skowron	13	41
3	0:43	1	85	0:13	Arizona	Nick Wilson 85-yard touchdown run, Casey Skowron kick good	13	48
4	12:38	7	21	2:07	Arizona	39-yard field goal by Casey Skowron	13	51
4	1:18	19	77	9:18	Arizona	Connor Brewer 3-yard touchdown run, Casey Skowron kick good	13	58
"TOP" = time of possession. For other American football terms, see Glossary of American football.							13	58

=== Northern Colorado ===
Northern Colorado at UNLV

Team	1	2	3	4	Total
Bears	0	3	7	2	12
• Rebels	7	3	3	0	13

- Date: September 6, 2014
- Location: Sam Boyd Stadium
  Whitney, NV
- Game start: 7:00 p.m. PDT
- Elapsed time: 2 hours and 54 minutes
- Game attendance: 17,289
- Game weather: Temperature: 100 • Wind: 6 mph NE • Weather: Clear skies
- Referee: David Alvarez
- TV announcers (Mountain West Network): Tony Cordasco, Caleb Herring

In their second game of the season, the Rebels won, 13–12 over the Northern Colorado Bears.

Scoring summary

Quarter	Time	Drive			Team	Scoring information	Score	
Quarter	Time	Plays	Yards	TOP	Team	Scoring information	Northern Colorado	UNLV
1	10:47	5	64	1:50	UNLV	Marcus Sullivan 6-yard touchdown reception from Blake Decker, Jonathan Leiva kick good	0	7
2	12:42	9	55	3:00	Northern Colorado	31-yard field goal by Seth Czapenski	3	7
2	5:58	4	-2	1:36	UNLV	54-yard field goal by Nicolai Bornand	3	10
3	6:55	8	97	4:26	Northern Colorado	Robert Holland 3-yard touchdown run, Seth Czapenski kick good	10	10
3	0:22	4	2	1:46	UNLV	35-yard field goal by Jonathan Leiva	10	13
4	10:54	1	2		Northern Colorado	Blake Decker tackled in end zone for a safety by Taylor Risner	12	13
"TOP" = time of possession. For other American football terms, see Glossary of American football.							12	13

=== Northern Illinois ===
Northern Illinois at UNLV

Team	1	2	3	4	Total
• Huskies	7	14	10	17	48
Rebels	5	0	21	8	34

- Date: September 13
- Location: Sam Boyd Stadium
  Whitney, NV
- Game start: 4:00 p.m. PDT
- Elapsed time: 3:30
- Game attendance: 14,305
- Game weather: Temperature: 100 • Wind: S 3 mph • Weather: Sunny, Clear, Hot
- Referee: Tony Cannella
- TV announcers (MWN): Ray Crawford, Doug Chapman, & Shea Peppler

In their third game of the season, the Rebels lost, 48–34 to the Northern Illinois Huskies.

Scoring summary

Quarter	Time	Drive			Team	Scoring information	Score	
Quarter	Time	Plays	Yards	TOP	Team	Scoring information	Northern Illinois	UNLV
1	12:12	8	50	2:48	UNLV	25-yard field goal by Jonathan Leiva	0	3
1	7:26	15	76	4:40	Northern Illinois	Cameron Stingily 5-yard touchdown run, Tyler Wedel kick good	7	3
1	4:44				UNLV	Northern Illinois called for a penalty in the end zone for a safety	7	5
2	6:24	14	80	4:11	Northern Illinois	Keith Harris 12-yard touchdown reception from Drew Hare, Tyler Wedel kick good	14	5
2	0:29	10	80	2:32	Northern Illinois	Juwan Brescacin 10-yard touchdown reception from Drew Hare, Tyler Wedel kick good	21	5
3	11:59	10	75	3:01	Northern Illinois	Drew Hare 12-yard touchdown run, Tyler Wedel kick good	28	5
3	10:07	6	75	1:52	UNLV	Devante Davis 26-yard touchdown reception from Blake Decker, Jonathan Leiva kick good	28	12
3	7:06	9	47	3:01	Northern Illinois	45-yard field goal by Tyler Wedel	31	12
3	4:44	5	95	2:16	UNLV	Devante Davis 53-yard touchdown reception from Blake Decker, Jonathan Leiva kick good	31	19
3	2:40	4	10	1:20	UNLV	Shaquille Murray-Lawrence 2-yard touchdown run, Jonathan Leiva kick good	31	26
4	11:11	9	62	3:49	Northern Illinois	33-yard field goal by Tyler Wedel	34	26
4	9:18	7	75	1:53	UNLV	Shaquille Murray-Lawrence 9-yard touchdown run, 2-point pass good	34	34
4	8:23	4	65	0:55	Northern Illinois	Da'Ron Brown 54-yard touchdown reception from Drew Hare, Tyler Wedel kick good	41	34
4	1:56	10	80	3:26	Northern Illinois	Cameron Stingily 2-yard touchdown run, Tyler Wedel kick good	48	34
"TOP" = time of possession. For other American football terms, see Glossary of American football.							48	34

=== At Houston ===
UNLV at Houston

Team	1	2	3	4	Total
Rebels	7	0	7	0	14
• Cougars	13	0	17	17	47

- Date: September 20
- Location: TDECU Stadium
  Houston, TX
- Game start: 5:00 p.m. PDT
- Elapsed time: 3:28
- Game attendance: 23,408
- Game weather: Temperature: 81 deg • Wind: E 10 mph • Weather: Partly sunny, humid
- Referee: Michael Roche
- TV announcers (ESPN3): Brett Dolan, Al Groh, & Brooke Williamson

In their fourth game of the season, the Rebels lost, 47–14 to the Houston Cougars.

Scoring summary

Quarter	Time	Drive			Team	Scoring information	Score	
Quarter	Time	Plays	Yards	TOP	Team	Scoring information	UNLV	Houston
1	11:11	9	70	3:49	UNLV	Keith Whitely 3-yard touchdown run, Jonathan Leiva kick good	7	0
1	6:33	8	67	2:50	Houston	John O'Korn 1-yard touchdown run, Kyle Bullard kick good	7	7
1	4:47	5	75	0:57	Houston	Daniel Spencer 35-yard touchdown run, Kyle Bullard kick failed	7	13
3	14:30	2	58	0:30	Houston	Ryan Jackson 26-yard touchdown reception from John O'Korn, Kyle Bullard kick good	7	20
3	11:47	5	32	1:48	Houston	Daniel Spencer 16-yard touchdown reception from John O'Korn, Kyle Bullard kick good	7	27
3	7:08	10	54	3:06	Houston	41-yard field goal by Kyle Bullard	7	30
3	2:52	11	75	4:16	UNLV	George Naufahu 1-yard touchdown run, Jonathan Leiva kick good	14	30
4	13:51	10	59	4:01	Houston	41-yard field goal by Kyle Bullard	14	33
4	10:34	3	64	1:15	Houston	Kenneth Farrow 1-yard touchdown run, Kyle Bullard kick good	14	40
4	9:14	1	23	0:28	Houston	Javin Webb 11-yard touchdown run, Ty Cummings kick good	14	47
"TOP" = time of possession. For other American football terms, see Glossary of American football.							14	47

=== At San Diego State ===
UNLV at San Diego State

Team	1	2	3	4	Total
Rebels	10	0	0	7	17
• Aztecs	7	21	0	6	34

- Date: September 27
- Location: Qualcomm Stadium
  San Diego, CA
- Game start: 5:00 p.m. PDT
- Elapsed time: 3:13
- Game attendance: 28,005
- Game weather: Temperature: 72 • Wind: 15 WSW • Weather: Partly cloudy
- Referee: Brandon Cruse
- TV announcers (ESPN3): Wayne Randazzo & Pat Hill

In their fifth game of the season, the Rebels lost, 34–17 to the San Diego State Aztecs.

Scoring summary

Quarter	Time	Drive			Team	Scoring information	Score	
Quarter	Time	Plays	Yards	TOP	Team	Scoring information	UNLV	San Diego State
1	12:10	4	8	1:15	UNLV	22-yard field goal by Jonathan Leiva	3	0
1	11:55	1	71	0:15	San Diego State	Donne Pumphrey 71-yard touchdown run, Donald Hageman kick good	3	7
1	4:17	7	88	2:32	UNLV	Devonte Boyd 44-yard touchdown reception from Blake Decker, Jonathan Leiva kick good	10	7
2	14:21	9	71	4:56	San Diego State	Donne Pumphrey 1-yard touchdown run, Donald Hageman kick good	10	14
2	3:04	4	57	2:39	San Diego State	Donne Pumphrey 3-yard touchdown run, Donald Hageman kick good	10	21
2	0:11	7	85	0:32	San Diego State	Donne Pumphrey 1-yard touchdown run, Donald Hageman kick good	10	28
4	13:37	13	67	7:01	San Diego State	24-yard field goal by Donald Hageman	10	31
4	10:47	7	80	2:50	UNLV	Blake Decker 2-yard touchdown run, Jonathan Leiva kick good	17	31
4	5:18	11	66	5:29	San Diego State	31-yard field goal by Donald Hageman	17	34
"TOP" = time of possession. For other American football terms, see Glossary of American football.							17	34

=== At San Jose State ===
UNLV at San Jose State

Team	1	2	3	4	Total
Rebels	7	0	0	3	10
• Spartans	0	16	10	7	33

- Date: October 4
- Location: Spartan Stadium
  San Jose, CA
- Game start: 8:00 PDT
- Elapsed time: 3:18
- Game attendance: 14,427
- Game weather: Temperature: 89 F • Wind: WNW11mph • Weather: Clear Skies
- Referee: Jim Farmer
- TV announcers (ESPNews): Mike Couzens & Dan Hawkins

In their sixth game of the season, the Rebels lost, 33–10 to the San Jose State Spartans.

Scoring summary

Quarter	Time	Drive			Team	Scoring information	Score	
Quarter	Time	Plays	Yards	TOP	Team	Scoring information	UNLV	San Jose State
1	9:39	11	60	3:32	UNLV	Blake Decker 1-yard touchdown run, Jonathan Leiva kick good	7	0
2	14:58	11	74	4:40	San Jose State	Joe Gray 1-yard touchdown run, Austin Lopez kick good	7	7
2	7:36	13	52	6:06	San Jose State	32-yard field goal by Austin Lopez	7	10
2	4:42	4	-7	1:31	San Jose State	33-yard field goal by Austin Lopez	7	13
2	0:05	11	50	3:20	San Jose State	47-yard field goal by Austin Lopez	7	16
3	10:13	10	25	2:59	San Jose State	47-yard field goal by Austin Lopez	7	19
3	6:46	4	80	1:15	San Jose State	Tyler Ervin 83-yard touchdown run, Austin Lopez kick good	7	26
4	14:51	2	53	0:31	San Jose State	Hansell Wilson 51-yard touchdown reception from Joe Gray, Austin Lopez kick good	7	33
4	12:35	8	40	2:06	UNLV	25-yard field goal by Jonathan Leiva	10	33
"TOP" = time of possession. For other American football terms, see Glossary of American football.							10	33

=== Fresno State ===
Fresno State at UNLV

Team	1	2	3	4	OT	Total
Bulldogs	0	0	14	13	0	27
• Rebels	3	14	7	3	3	30

- Date: October 11
- Location: Sam Boyd Stadium
  Whitney, NV
- Game start: 7:00 p.m. PDT
- Elapsed time: 3:55
- Game attendance: 15,398
- Game weather: Temperature: 81 • Wind: S 4 mph • Weather: Clear
- Referee: Eddy Shelton
- TV announcers (CBSSN): Rich Waltz, Adam Archuleta, Dallas Clark, & Cassie Gallo

In their seventh game of the season, the Rebels won, 30–27, in overtime, over the Fresno State Bulldogs.

Scoring summary

Quarter	Time	Drive			Team	Scoring information	Score	
Quarter	Time	Plays	Yards	TOP	Team	Scoring information	Fresno State	UNLV
1	10:49	9	70	4:11	UNLV	33-yard field goal by Jonathan Leiva	0	3
2	14:00	6	78	2:02	UNLV	Shaquille Murray-Lawrence 3-yard touchdown run, Jonathan Leiva kick good	0	10
2	11:56	3	26	1:14	UNLV	Kendal Keys 5-yard touchdown reception from Blake Decker, Jonathan Leiva kick good	0	17
3	13:45	5	75	1:15	Fresno State	Chad Olsen 29-yard touchdown reception from Brian Burrell, Kody Kroening kick good	7	17
3	0:56	11	63	4:25	Fresno State	Josh Harper 27-yard touchdown reception from Brian Burrell, Kody Kroening kick good	14	17
3	0:02	4	65	0:54	UNLV	Blake Decker 3-yard touchdown run, Jonathan Leiva kick good	14	24
4	13:47	5	75	1:15	Fresno State	Chad Olsen 3-yard touchdown reception from Brian Burrell, Kody Kroening kick good	21	24
4	7:21	5	63	1:13	Fresno State	Marteze Waller 13-yard touchdown run, Kody Kroening kick failed	27	24
4	3:37	10	36	3:44	UNLV	46-yard field goal by Nicolai Bornand	27	27
OT		4	9		UNLV	33-yard field goal by Nicolai Bornand	27	30
"TOP" = time of possession. For other American football terms, see Glossary of American football.							27	30

=== At Utah State ===
UNLV at Utah State

Team	1	2	3	4	Total
Rebels	0	13	0	7	20
• Aggies	7	10	10	7	34

- Date: October 25
- Location: Romney Stadium
  Logan, UT
- Game start: 4:00 PDT
- Elapsed time: 3:32
- Game attendance: 20,153
- Game weather: Temperature: 70 deg. • Wind: 12mphSW • Weather: Clear skies
- Referee: Greg Burks
- TV announcers (ESPNews): Mike Corey & Rene Ingoglia

In their eighth game of the season, the Rebels lost, 34–20, to the Utah State Aggies.

Scoring summary

Quarter	Time	Drive			Team	Scoring information	Score	
Quarter	Time	Plays	Yards	TOP	Team	Scoring information	UNLV	Utah State
1	1:29	8	56	3:40	Utah State	Jefferso Court 1-yard touchdown reception from Craig Harrison, Nick Diaz kick good	0	7
2	14:44	5	8	1:37	Utah State	27-yard field goal by Nick Diaz	0	10
2	12:17	5	44	2:15	UNLV	Kendal Keys 31-yard touchdown reception from Blake Decker, Jonathan Leiva kick good	7	10
2	7:17	4	83	2:02	Utah State	JoJo Natson 71-yard touchdown reception from Craig Harrison, Nick Diaz kick good	7	17
2	0:04	7	69	0:50	UNLV	Taylor Barnhill 2-yard touchdown reception from Blake Decker, Jonathan Leiva kick blocked	13	17
3	10:25	1	69	0:12	Utah State	Joe Hill 69-yard touchdown reception from Craig Harrison, Nick Diaz kick good	13	24
3	5:53	6	22	2:35	Utah State	49-yard field goal by Nick Diaz	13	27
4	11:48	9	73	3:12	Utah State	Joe Hill 7-yard touchdown run, Nick Diaz kick good	13	34
4	7:06	10	80	4:34	UNLV	Devonte Boyd 41-yard touchdown reception from Blake Decker, Jonathan Leiva kick good	20	34
"TOP" = time of possession. For other American football terms, see Glossary of American football.							20	34

=== New Mexico ===
New Mexico at UNLV

Team	1	2	3	4	Total
• Lobos	7	10	0	14	31
Rebels	0	7	14	7	28

- Date: November 1
- Location: Sam Boyd Stadium
  Whitney, NV
- Game start: 2:30 p.m. PDT
- Elapsed time: 3:10
- Game attendance: 13,419
- Game weather: Temperature: 70 • Wind: WSW 19 • Weather: Mostly sunny, breezy
- Referee: Kevin Mar
- TV announcers (RTRM): Ari Wolfe, Sherdrick Bonner, & Torry Holt

In their ninth game of the season, the Rebels lost, 31–28, to the New Mexico Lobos.

Scoring summary

Quarter	Time	Drive			Team	Scoring information	Score	
Quarter	Time	Plays	Yards	TOP	Team	Scoring information	New Mexico	UNLV
1	2:42	5	80	2:20	New Mexico	Jhurell Pressley 34-yard touchdown run, Zack Rogers kick good	7	0
2	6:05	4	2	1:40	New Mexico	44-yard field goal by Zack Rogers	10	0
2	1:50	6	51	2:52	New Mexico	Jhurell Pressley 1-yard touchdown run, Zack Rogers kick good	17	0
2	0:11	9	75	1:39	UNLV	Blake Decker 2-yard touchdown run, Jonathan Leiva kick good	17	7
3	11:46	10	77	3:07	UNLV	Shaquille Murray-Lawrence 1-yard touchdown run, Jonathan Leiva kick good	17	14
3	5:49	13	95	4:24	UNLV	Shaquille Murray-Lawrence 14-yard touchdown run, Jonathan Leiva kick good	17	21
4	12:05	1	4	0:05	New Mexico	Jhurell Pressley 4-yard touchdown run, Zack Rogers kick good	24	21
4	8:28	12	85	3:32	UNLV	Keith Whitely 3-yard touchdown run, Jonathan Leiva kick good	24	28
4	1:22	15	66	6:57	New Mexico	Teriyon Gipson 3-yard touchdown run, Zack Rogers kick good	31	28
"TOP" = time of possession. For other American football terms, see Glossary of American football.							31	28

=== Air Force ===
Air Force at UNLV

Team	1	2	3	4	Total
• Falcons	10	21	14	3	48
Rebels	7	7	7	0	21

- Date: November 8
- Location: Sam Boyd Stadium
  Whitney, NV
- Game start: 1:00 p.m. PST
- Elapsed time: 2:59
- Game attendance: 13,481
- Game weather: Temperature: 81 • Wind: 6 mph NE • Weather: Sunny and Clear
- Referee: Brandon Cruse
- TV announcers (MWN): Ray Crawford & Doug Chapman

In their tenth game of the season, the Rebels lost, 48–21, to the Air Force Falcons.

Scoring summary

Quarter	Time	Drive			Team	Scoring information	Score	
Quarter	Time	Plays	Yards	TOP	Team	Scoring information	Air Force	UNLV
1	9:50	13	75	5:10	UNLV	Blake Decker 11-yard touchdown run, Jonathan Leiva kick good	0	7
1	6:07	9	39	3:36	Air Force	39-yard field goal by Will Conant	3	7
1	0:49	9	62	3:01	Air Force	D.J. Johnson 8-yard touchdown run, Will Conant kick good	10	7
2	8:27	17	78	6:35	Air Force	Kale Pearson 1-yard touchdown run, Will Conant kick good	17	7
2	4:33	4	70	1:30	Air Force	Jale Robinette 59-yard touchdown reception from Kale Pearson, Will Conant kick good	24	7
2	2:14	7	65	2:09	UNLV	Devante Davis 4-yard touchdown reception from Blake Decker, Jonathan Leiva kick good	24	14
2	0:56	6	55	1:07	Air Force	Jacobi Owens 1-yard touchdown run, Will Conant kick good	31	14
3	13:46	4	67	1:12	Air Force	Shayne Davern 2-yard touchdown run, Will Conant kick good	38	14
3	8:21	2	2	0:29	UNLV	Shaquille Murray-Lawrence 1-yard touchdown run, Jonathan Leiva kick good	38	21
3	0:35	10	93	4:07	Air Force	D.J. Johnson 2-yard touchdown run, Will Conant kick good	45	21
4	12:28	6	59	2:32	Air Force	33-yard field goal by Will Conant	48	21
"TOP" = time of possession. For other American football terms, see Glossary of American football.							48	21

=== At BYU ===
UNLV at BYU

Team	1	2	3	4	Total
Rebels	3	10	10	0	23
• Cougars	7	14	21	0	42

- Date: November 15
- Location: LaVell Edwards Stadium
  Provo, UT
- Game start: 4:00 p.m. PST
- Elapsed time: 3:42
- Game attendance: 53,622
- Game weather: Temperature: 30 F • Wind: NE @ 8 • Weather: Cloudy; snow possible
- Referee: Rick Louimet
- TV announcers (ESPNU/BYUtv): Anish Shroff & Kelly Stouffer

In their eleventh game of the season, the Rebels lost, 42–23, to the BYU Cougars.

Scoring summary

Quarter	Time	Drive			Team	Scoring information	Score	
Quarter	Time	Plays	Yards	TOP	Team	Scoring information	UNLV	BYU
1	9:13	6	16	2:45	UNLV	46-yard field goal by Jonathan Leiva	3	0
1	7:25	6	84	1:43	BYU	Jordan Leslie 30-yard touchdown run, Trevor Samson kick good	3	7
2	6:18	4	65	1:05	BYU	Paul Lasike 8-yard touchdown run, Trevor Samson kick good	3	14
2	5:32	2	75	0:50	UNLV	Shaquille Murray-Lawrence 68-yard touchdown run, Jonathan Leiva kick good	10	14
2	3:00	7	34	2:28	UNLV	21-yard field goal by Jonathan Leiva	13	14
2	1:23	5	65	1:29	BYU	Paul Lasike 4-yard touchdown run, Trevor Samson kick good	13	21
3	13:25	6	88	1:27	BYU	Devin Mahina 15-yard touchdown reception from Christian Stewart, Trevor Samson kick good	13	28
3	11:11	4	3	0:56	UNLV	33-yard field goal by Jonathan Leiva	16	28
3	5:42	7	67	1:36	BYU	Paul Lasike 26-yard touchdown reception from Christian Stewart, Trevor Samson kick good	16	35
3	1:57	11	65	3:45	UNLV	Devonte Boyd 40-yard touchdown reception from Jared Lebowitz, Jonathan Leiva kick good	23	35
3	1:31	2	51	0:19	BYU	Mitch Mathews 8-yard touchdown reception from Christian Stewart, Trevor Samson kick good	23	42
"TOP" = time of possession. For other American football terms, see Glossary of American football.							23	42

=== At Hawaii ===
UNLV at Hawaii

Team	1	2	3	4	Total
Rebels	14	0	0	21	35
• Rainbow Warriors	7	7	7	16	37

- Date: November 22
- Location: Aloha Stadium
  Halawa, HI
- Game start: 8:00 p.m. PST
- Elapsed time: 3:26
- Game attendance: 25,604
- Game weather: Temperature: 79 deg. • Wind: E 6 MPH • Weather: Partly Cloudy
- Referee: Reggie Smith
- TV announcers (MWN): Robert Kekaula, Rich Miano, & Scott Robbs

In their twelfth game of the season, the Rebels lost, 37–35, to the Hawaii Rainbow Warriors.

Scoring summary

Quarter	Time	Drive			Team	Scoring information	Score	
Quarter	Time	Plays	Yards	TOP	Team	Scoring information	UNLV	Hawaii
1	12:23	2	45	0:22	UNLV	Jared Lebowitz 18-yard touchdown run, Jonathan Leiva kick good	7	0
1	7:18	7	97	2:25	UNLV	Shaquille Murray-Lawrence 2-yard touchdown run, Jonathan Leiva kick good	14	0
1	0:13	5	76	2:03	Hawaii	Joey Iosefa 9-yard touchdown run, Tyler Hadden kick good	14	7
2	3:33	5	44	1:56	Hawaii	Harold Moleni 1-yard touchdown reception from Joey Iosefa, Tyler Hadden kick good	14	14
3	3:30	5	94	2:33	Hawaii	Di Saint Juste 52-yard touchdown run, Tyler Hadden kick good	14	21
4	12:10	10	63	4:46	Hawaii	40-yard field goal by Tyler Hadden	13	24
4	11:39	4	75	0:31	UNLV	Marcus Sullivan 14-yard touchdown reception from Blake Decker, Jonathan Leiva kick good	21	24
4	4:51	4	53	1:19	UNLV	Maika Mataele 13-yard touchdown reception from Blake Decker, Jonathan Leiva kick good	28	24
4	2:00	9	82	2:45	Hawaii	Joey Iosefa 1-yard touchdown run, Tyler Hadden kick good	28	31
4	0:15	7	75	1:45	UNLV	Taylor Barnhill 7-yard touchdown reception from Blake Decker, Jonathan Leiva kick good	35	31
4	0:00	3	42	0:13	Hawaii	Marcus Kemp 20-yard touchdown reception from Ikaika Woolsey, 2-point run failed	35	37
"TOP" = time of possession. For other American football terms, see Glossary of American football.							35	37

=== Nevada ===
Nevada at UNLV

Team	1	2	3	4	Total
• Wolf Pack	7	7	21	14	49
Rebels	7	10	3	7	27

- Date: November 29
- Location: Sam Boyd Stadium
  Whitney, NV
- Game start: 7:30 p.m. PST
- Elapsed time: 3:23
- Game attendance: 20,151
- Game weather: Temperature: 64 • Wind: SSE 15 • Weather: Clear
- Referee: David Alvarez
- TV announcers (ESPNU): Jason Benetti & Mike Bellotti

In their thirteenth game of the season, the Rebels lost, 49–27, to the Nevada Wolf Pack.

Scoring summary

Quarter	Time	Drive			Team	Scoring information	Score	
Quarter	Time	Plays	Yards	TOP	Team	Scoring information	Nevada	UNLV
1	8:25	7	80	3:21	Nevada	Cody Fajardo 25-yard touchdown run, Brent Zuzo kick good	7	0
1	4:52	10	75	3:33	UNLV	Devante Davis 3-yard touchdown reception from Blake Decker, Jonathan Leiva kick good	7	7
2	10:33	3	47	0:53	UNLV	Devonte Boyd 24-yard touchdown reception from Blake Decker, Jonathan Leiva kick good	7	14
2	7:31	8	22	2:15	UNLV	44-yard field goal by Jonathan Leiva	7	17
2	1:31	7	52	3:00	Nevada	Richy Turner 18-yard touchdown reception from Cody Fajardo, Brent Zuzo kick good	14	17
3	9:33	11	87	5:24	Nevada	Jerico Richardson 12-yard touchdown reception from Cody Fajardo, Brent Zuzo kick good	21	17
3	7:00	8	46	2:25	UNLV	23-yard field goal by Jonathan Leiva	21	20
3	5:08	5	74	1:44	Nevada	Kendall Brock 3-yard touchdown reception from Cody Fajardo, Brent Zuzo kick good	28	20
3	4:15				Nevada	Interception returned 32 yards for touchdown by Lenny Jones, Brent Zuzo kick good	35	20
4	11:47	2	17	1:11	Nevada	Jerico Richardson 4-yard touchdown run, Brent Zuzo kick good	42	20
4	6:51	6	56	3:31	Nevada	Devin Combs 5-yard touchdown run, Brent Zuzo kick good	49	20
4	5:37	5	71	1:07	UNLV	Shaquille Murray-Lawrence 12-yard touchdown run, Jonathan Leiva kick good	49	27
"TOP" = time of possession. For other American football terms, see Glossary of American football.							49	27
