= 2014 San Diego State Aztecs football team =

American college football season

2014 San Diego State Aztecs football

Poinsettia Bowl vs. Navy, L 16–17
- Conference: Mountain West Conference
- West Division
- Record: 7–6 (5–3 MW)
- Head coach: Rocky Long (4th season)
- Offensive coordinator: Bob Toledo (2nd season)
- Offensive scheme: West Coast
- Base defense: 3–3–5
- Home stadium: Qualcomm Stadium

2014 Mountain West Conference football standings
	Conf.			Overall
Team	W		L	W		L
Mountain Division
No. 16 Boise State x$	7	–	1	12	–	2
Colorado State	6	–	2	10	–	3
Utah State	6	–	2	10	–	4
Air Force	5	–	3	10	–	3
New Mexico	2	–	6	4	–	8
Wyoming	2	–	6	4	–	8
West Division
Fresno State x	5	–	3	6	–	8
San Diego State	5	–	3	7	–	6
Nevada	4	–	4	7	–	6
Hawaii	3	–	5	4	–	9
San Jose State	2	–	6	3	–	9
UNLV	1	–	7	2	–	11
Championship: Boise State 28, Fresno State 14
$ – Conference champion; x – Division champion/co-champions; Rankings from AP Poll

The 2014 San Diego State Aztecs football team represented San Diego State University in the 2014 NCAA Division I FBS football season. The Aztecs were led by fourth-year head coach Rocky Long and played their home games at Qualcomm Stadium. They were members of the West Division of the Mountain West Conference. San Diego State finished the season 7–6, 5–3 in Mountain West play to finish in a share for first place in the West Division. However, due to Mountain West tiebreaker rules, because of their head-to-head loss to Fresno State they were not considered division co–champions. They were invited to the Poinsettia Bowl where they lost to Navy 16–17.

== Schedule ==
Date	Time	Opponent	Site	TV	Result	Attendance
August 30	4:00 p.m.	No. 23 (FCS) Northern Arizona*	Qualcomm Stadium; San Diego, CA	CBSSN	W 38–7	30,761
September 6	8:00 p.m.	at No. 21 North Carolina*	Kenan Memorial Stadium; Chapel Hill, NC	ESPNews	L 27–31	58,000
September 20	7:30 p.m.	at Oregon State*	Reser Stadium; Corvallis, OR	FS1	L 7–28	41,339
September 27	5:00 p.m.	UNLV	Qualcomm Stadium; San Diego, CA	ESPN3	W 34–17	28,005
October 3	7:00 p.m.	at Fresno State	Bulldog Stadium; Fresno, CA (rivalry)	CBSSN	L 13–24	33,894
October 10	6:30 p.m.	at New Mexico	University Stadium; Albuquerque, NM	ESPNU	W 24–14	19,497
October 18	7:30 p.m.	Hawaii	Qualcomm Stadium; San Diego, CA	CBSSN	W 20–10	35,686
November 1	7:30 p.m.	at Nevada	Mackay Stadium; Reno, NV	CBSSN	L 14–30	20,508
November 8	3:30 p.m.	Idaho*^{†}	Qualcomm Stadium; San Diego, CA	RTRM, FSSD	W 35–21	46,293
November 15	7:15 p.m.	at Boise State	Albertsons Stadium; Boise, ID	ESPNU	L 29–38	27,478
November 21	6:30 p.m.	Air Force	Qualcomm Stadium; San Diego, CA	CBSSN	W 30–14	28,626
November 29	12:30 p.m.	San Jose State	Qualcomm Stadium; San Diego, CA	CBSSN	W 38–7	24,391
December 23	6:30 p.m.	Navy*	Qualcomm Stadium; San Diego, CA (Poinsettia Bowl)	ESPN	L 16–17	33,077
*Non-conference game; ^{†}Homecoming; Rankings from AP Poll released prior to the game; All times are in Pacific time
