= 2014 Mountain West Conference Football Championship Game =

2014 Sports Authority Mountain West Conference Football Championship Game
- Conference Championship
Fresno State Bulldogs	Boise State Broncos
(6–6)	(10–2)
14	28
Head coach: Tim DeRuyter	Head coach: Bryan Harsin
	AP / Coaches / CFP; 22 / 22 / 22
	1	2	3	4	Total
Fresno State	0	0	7	7	14
Boise State	14	7	7	0	28
- Date: December 6, 2014
- Season: 2014
- Stadium: Albertsons Stadium
- Location: Boise, Idaho
- MVP: Offense: Grant Hedrick, Quarterback (Boise State); Defense: Tanner Vallejo, Linebacker (Boise State)
- Favorite: Boise State by 24
- Referee: Reggie Smith
- Attendance: 26,101

United States TV coverage
- Network: CBS at 7 p.m. PT / 8 p.m. MT
- Announcers: Carter Blackburn (play-by-play), Aaron Taylor (color) & Jamie Erdahl (sideline)

2014 Mountain West Conference football standings
	Conf.			Overall
Team	W		L	W		L
Mountain Division
No. 16 Boise State x$	7	–	1	12	–	2
Colorado State	6	–	2	10	–	3
Utah State	6	–	2	10	–	4
Air Force	5	–	3	10	–	3
New Mexico	2	–	6	4	–	8
Wyoming	2	–	6	4	–	8
West Division
Fresno State x	5	–	3	6	–	8
San Diego State	5	–	3	7	–	6
Nevada	4	–	4	7	–	6
Hawaii	3	–	5	4	–	9
San Jose State	2	–	6	3	–	9
UNLV	1	–	7	2	–	11
Championship: Boise State 28, Fresno State 14
$ – Conference champion; x – Division champion/co-champions; Rankings from AP Poll

The 2014 Sports Authority Mountain West Football Championship Game determined the 2014 football champion of the Mountain West Conference (MW). The game featured the Mountain Division champion Boise State Broncos hosting the West Division champion Fresno State Bulldogs. Boise State was ranked #22 in the AP Poll, USA Today Coaches' Poll, and College Football Playoff Rankings.
