= Jennie Clarke =

Jennie Clarke may refer to:

- Jennie Everton Clarke, American orphanage founder
- Jennie Thornley Clarke, American educator, writer, and anthologist

== See also ==
- Jennie Loriston-Clarke, British equestrian
