= Joliet, Texas =

- Unincorporated community
- Location within Texas Location within the United States
- Coordinates: 29°46′10″N 97°40′45″W
- Country: United States
- State: Texas
- County: Caldwell
- Elevation: 417 ft (127 m)
- Time zone: UTC-6 (Central (CST))
  - Summer (DST): UTC-5 (CDT)
- Area codes: 512 & 737
- GNIS feature ID: 1360363

Joliet is an unincorporated community in Caldwell County, in the U.S. state of Texas. According to the Handbook of Texas, there were no population estimates made available to the community in 2000. The community is located within the Greater Austin metropolitan area.

== History ==
While some early settlers lived in Joliet during the 1940s, the community expanded during the 1920s after the discovery of oil. By the 1930s, however, the population had fallen back down to ten.

== Geography ==
Joliet stands at the intersection of Farm to Market Roads 671 and 2984, seven miles northwest of Luling in southwest-central Caldwell County.

== Education ==
In the 1940s, there were separate school campuses for African American, Mexican American, and White students living in Joliet. Today, the community is served by the Luling Independent School District.
