= Soda Springs, Texas =

Unincorporated community in the United States

- Unincorporated community
- Location within Texas Location within the United States
- Coordinates: 29°43′08″N 97°35′57″W
- Country: United States
- State: Texas
- County: Caldwell
- Elevation: 371 ft (113 m)
- Time zone: UTC-6 (Central (CST))
  - Summer (DST): UTC-5 (CDT)
- Area codes: 512 & 737
- GNIS feature ID: 1379090

Soda Springs is an unincorporated community in Caldwell County, in the U.S. state of Texas. According to the Handbook of Texas, there were no population estimates made to the community in 2000. It is located within the Greater Austin metropolitan area.

== History ==
Today, a few bridges mark the presence of the community. One of these bridges is a lenticular bridge over Plum Creek on County Road 130. This bridge was built in 1920 and is 181 ft (55 m) long.

== Geography ==
Soda Springs sits on Farm to Market Road 1322, 5 mi (8.0 km) northeast of Luling in southern Caldwell County.

== Education ==
Soda Springs is served by the Luling Independent School District.
