= Luling Independent School District =

School district in Texas, United States

Address
- 115 West Bowie Street Luling, Texas, 78648; United States

District information
- Grades: PK–12
- Schools: 3
- NCES District ID: 4828590

Students and staff
- Students: 1,426 (2023–2024)
- Teachers: 104.21 (on an FTE basis)
- Student–teacher ratio: 13.68:1

Other information
- Website: www.luling.txed.net

Luling Independent School District is a public school district based in Luling, Texas (USA). Located in Caldwell County, a small portion of the district extends into Guadalupe County. It also serves the unincorporated communities of Joliet, McNeil, and Soda Springs.

In 2009, the school district was rated "academically acceptable" by the Texas Education Agency.

== Schools ==
- Luling High School (Grades 9–12)
- Luling Junior High (Grades 6–8)
- Leonard Shanklin Elementary (Grades 3–5)
- Luling Primary (Grades 1–2)
