= Craig Mager =

American football player (born 1992)

No. 29, 49
- Position: Cornerback

Personal information
- Born: June 11, 1992 (age 34); Luling, Texas, U.S.
- Listed height: 5 ft 11 in (1.80 m)
- Listed weight: 200 lb (91 kg)

Career information
- High school: Luling
- College: Texas State
- NFL draft: 2015: 3rd round, 83rd overall pick

Career history
- San Diego / Los Angeles Chargers (2015–2018); Denver Broncos (2018)

Awards and highlights
- Second-team All-Sun Belt (2014)

Career NFL statistics
- Total tackles: 41
- Fumble recoveries: 1
- Pass deflections: 6
- Interceptions: 1
- Stats at Pro Football Reference

Craig Stephen Mager (born June 11, 1992) is an American former professional football player who was a cornerback in the National Football League (NFL). He played college football for the Texas State Bobcats. As a senior in 2014, Mager earned Second-team All-Sun Belt Conference. He attended Luling High School, where he played football, basketball, and ran track.

Mager was raised by single mother Cathy Mager, who died on June 15, 2007.

== Professional career ==
Pre-draft measurables
Height	Weight	Arm length	Hand span	40-yard dash	10-yard split	20-yard split	20-yard shuttle	Three-cone drill	Vertical jump	Broad jump	Bench press
5 ft 11 1/2 in (1.82 m)	201 lb (91 kg)	29 3/4 in (0.76 m)	9 1/4 in (0.23 m)	4.44 s	1.53 s	2.58 s	4.07 s	6.83 s	38 in (0.97 m)	10 ft 10 in (3.30 m)	17 reps
All values from NFL Combine

=== San Diego / Los Angeles Chargers ===
==== 2015 ====
The San Diego Chargers selected Mager in the third round (83rd overall) of the 2015 NFL draft. He was the 13th cornerback selected in 2015. On May 14, 2015, the Chargers signed Mager to a four-year, $2.99 million contract that includes a signing bonus of $330,790.

Throughout training camp, Mager competed against Steve Williams, Chris Davis, Greg Ducre, Richard Crawford, Manny Asprilla, and Lowell Rose. Head coach Mike McCoy named Mager the fifth cornerback on the Chargers' depth chart, behind Jason Verrett, Brandon Flowers, Patrick Robinson, and Williams.

On September 20, 2015, Mager made his professional regular season debut in the Chargers' 24–19 loss at the Cincinnati Bengals. He missed five games after suffering a torn hamstring (Weeks 4–8). On November 9, 2015, he recorded two combined tackles and deflected a pass as the Chargers loss 22–19 at the Chicago Bears. He made his first career tackle on wide receiver Marquess Wilson after he made a 15-yard reception. On December 24, 2015, Mager earned his first career start and recorded a season-high four combined tackles during a 30–14 victory over the Miami Dolphins. He finished his rookie season with nine combined tackles (eight solo) and two pass deflections in ten games and two starts.

==== 2016 ====
Mager entered training camp in 2016 competing against Casey Hayward and Jahleel Addae for the job as third cornerback. Mager was named the fourth cornerback in the depth chart to start the regular season, behind Verrett, Flowers, and Hayward.

On October 2, 2016, Mager made two combined tackles, a pass deflection, and made his first career interception off of New Orleans Saints quarterback Drew Brees during a 35–34 loss. The following week, he collected six combined tackles in the Chargers' 34–31 loss at the Oakland Raiders. He missed Weeks 8-9 after suffering a concussion during a 33–30 overtime victory at the Atlanta Falcons in Week 7. On November 27, 2016, Mager made a season-high seven combined tackles in a 21–13 loss at the Houston Texans. Mager missed the last three games of the season after suffering a shoulder and elbow injury in Week 14. On December 31, 2016, the Los Angeles Chargers placed Mager on injured reserve. He finished the season with 31 combined tackles (20 solo), deflected four passes, and made one interception in eight starts and 11 games.

==== 2017 ====
Mager entered training camp on the roster bubble and competed for a roster spot against Desmond King, Trovon Reed, Trevor Williams, Brandon Stewart, Randall Evans, Michael Davis, and Jeff Richards. He suffered a hamstring injury that caused him to miss the end of training camp and first two preseason games. On September 3, 2017, Mager was waived by the Chargers and was signed to the practice squad the next day. He was promoted to the active roster on December 16, 2017.

==== 2018 ====
On September 15, 2018, Mager was placed on injured reserve with a hamstring injury. He was released on September 26, 2018.

=== Denver Broncos ===
On December 19, 2018, Mager was signed by the Denver Broncos a two-year deal. On April 18, 2019, the Broncos released Mager.
