= 2014 Sun Belt Conference football season =

- League: NCAA Division I FBS (Football Bowl Subdivision)
- Sport: Football
- Duration: August 2014–January 2015
- Teams: 11
- Total attendance: 1,190,442
- TV partner(s): ESPN, CST

2015 NFL Draft
- Top draft pick: CB Craig Mager, Texas State
- Picked by: San Diego Chargers, 83rd overall

Regular season
- Season champions: Georgia Southern
- Runners-up: Louisiana–Lafayette
- Season MVP: Elijah McGuire
- Top scorer: Marcus Cox (114 points)

Football seasons
- 2013 2015

2014 Sun Belt Conference football standings
	Conf.			Overall
Team	W		L	W		L
Georgia Southern * $	8	–	0	9	–	3
Louisiana–Lafayette ***	5	–	1	7	–	4
Appalachian State *	6	–	2	7	–	5
Texas State	5	–	3	7	–	5
Arkansas State	5	–	3	7	–	6
South Alabama	5	–	3	6	–	7
Louisiana–Monroe	3	–	5	4	–	8
Troy	3	–	5	3	–	9
New Mexico State	1	–	7	2	–	10
Idaho **	1	–	7	1	–	10
Georgia State	0	–	8	1	–	11
$ – Conference champion; * – Appalachian State and Georgia Southern ineligible for postseason play due to FCS-to-FBS transition rules ** – Idaho ineligible for postseason play due to APR penalties *** – Louisiana–Lafayette vacated 2 wins due to NCAA violations

The 2014 Sun Belt Conference football season was the 14th college football season for the Sun Belt Conference. During the 2014 season, eleven schools competed in Sun Belt football: Appalachian State, Arkansas State, Georgia Southern, Georgia State, Idaho, Louisiana–Lafayette, Louisiana–Monroe, New Mexico State, South Alabama, Texas State, and Troy.

The conference title was won by Georgia Southern, in its first year as both a Sun Belt member and an FBS program. The Eagles became only the third team to win a conference championship in their first FBS season. The other two schools to accomplish this feat were Nevada, Big West Conference champions in 1992, and Marshall, which won the Mid-American Conference crown in 1997. Georgia Southern also became the first team ever to go unbeaten in conference play in its first FBS season (both the 1992 Nevada and 1997 Marshall teams lost once in conference play).

== Previous season ==
The Louisiana-Lafayette Ragin' Cajuns and the Arkansas State Red Wolves both finished 5-2 and were co-champions of the Sun Belt Conference. The Ragin' Cajuns earned the conference's first bowl spot in the R+L Carrier New Orleans Bowl, as Louisiana-Lafayette defeated Tulane 24–21 to win their 3rd straight New Orleans Bowl. Arkansas State earned the second and final Sun Belt bowl, as they played in the GoDaddy Bowl. Arkansas State scored a late touchdown in the fourth quarter to upset Ball State, who entered the game with a 10–2 record, and win their second straight GoDaddy Bowl.

The Sun Belt had seven teams eligible for bowl games, but only two received bids (Louisiana-Lafayette and ASU). Western Kentucky had the third best record at 8–4, while ULM, South Alabama, Texas State, and Troy had records of 6-6. The only team that was not eligible for a bowl game was Georgia State.

== Preseason ==
=== Award watch lists ===
The following Sun Belt players were named to preseason award watch lists:

Walter Camp Award:

- Qushaun Lee – Arkansas State

Butkus Award:

- Michael Orakpo - Texas State

Davey O'Brien Award:

- Terrance Broadway – Louisiana–Lafayette

Mackey Award:

- Darion Griswold - Arkansas State
- Wes Saxton - South Alabama

Ray Guy Award:

- Justin Manton - UL Monroe
- Austin Rehkow - Idaho

Lou Groza Award:

- Maxwell Johnson - New Mexico State

Rimington Trophy:

- Bryce Giddens - Arkansas State
- Valerian Ume-Ezeoke - New Mexico State
- Mike Marboe - Idaho

Thorpe Award:

- Sterling Young – Arkansas State
- Rocky Hayes – Arkansas State

Paul Hornung Award:

- Rashon Ceaser - UL Monroe
- J. D. McKissic - Arkansas State

Lombardi Award:

- Bryce Giddens - Arkansas State
- Qushaun Lee - Arkansas State
- Justin Hamilton - Louisiana-Lafayette
- Mykhael Quave - Louisiana-Lafayette
- Daniel Quave - Louisiana-Lafayette
- Dominique Tovell - Louisiana-Lafayette
- Gerrand Johnson - UL Monroe
- David Mayo - Texas State
- Terrence Jones - Troy
- Tyler Roberts - Troy
- Ucambre Williams - South Alabama

Doak Walker Award:

- Marcus Cox - Appalachian State
- Michael Gordon – Arkansas State
- Alonzo Harris – Louisiana-Lafayette
- Robert Lowe – Texas State

=== Sun Belt Media Day ===
Sun Belt Conference Media Day was held on July 22, 2014 in the Mercedes-Benz Superdome in New Orleans, Louisiana.

- Preseason Offensive Player of the Year - Terrance Broadway (QB, Louisiana-Lafayette)
- Preseason Defensive Player of the Year - Qushaun Lee (DL, Arkansas State)

==== Coaches Poll ====
- Louisiana-Lafayette - 121 (11)
- Arkansas State - 102
- South Alabama - 98
- Troy - 84
- UL Monroe - 78
- Texas State - 70
- Appalachian State - 47
- Georgia Southern - 44
- Idaho - 29
- Georgia State - 27
- New Mexico State - 26

==== Preseason All–Conference Team ====
Offense

QB Terrance Broadway (Louisiana-Lafayette)
RB Alonzo Harris (Louisiana-Lafayette)
RB Elijah McGuire (Louisiana-Lafayette)
WR J.D. McKissic (Arkansas State)
WR Jamal Robinson (Louisiana-Lafayette)
WR Rashon Ceaser (UL Monroe)
TE Wes Saxton (South Alabama)
OL Daniel Quave (Louisiana-Lafayette)
OL Mike Marboe, (Idaho)
OL Chris May (South Alabama)
OL Ucambre Williams (South Alabama)
OL Terrence Jones (Troy)

Defense

DL Chris Stone (Arkansas State)
DL Justin Hamilton (Louisiana-Lafayette)
DL Gerrand Johnson (UL Monroe)
DL Tyler Roberts (Troy)
LB Qushaun Lee (Arkansas State)
LB Dominique Tovell (Louisiana-Lafayette)
LB David Mayo (Texas State)
LB Michael Orakpo (Texas State)
DB Rocky Hayes (Arkansas State)
DB Sterling Young (Arkansas State)
DB Trevence Patt (Louisiana-Lafayette)
DB Craig Mager (Texas State)

Specialists

PK Jason Dann (Texas State)
P Austin Rehkow (Idaho)
RS J.D. McKissic (Arkansas State)

== Coaches ==
Note: Stats shown are before the beginning of the season

Team	Head coach	Years at school	Overall record	Record at school	Sun Belt record
Appalachian State	Scott Satterfield	2	4–8	4–8	0–0
Arkansas State	Blake Anderson	1	0–0	0–0	0–0
Georgia Southern	Willie Fritz	1	137–62	0–0	0–0
Georgia State	Trent Miles	2	20–48	0–12	0–7
Idaho	Paul Petrino	2	1–11	1–11	0-0
Louisiana–Lafayette	Mark Hudspeth	4	93-33	27-12	17-6
Louisiana–Monroe	Todd Berry	5	52-85	23-26	17-14
New Mexico State	Doug Martin	2	31–63	2–10	0–0
South Alabama	Joey Jones	5	34-28	31-21	5-10
Troy	Larry Blakeney	24	175-104-1	175-104-1	49-25
Texas State	Dennis Franchione	6	203–121–2	29-29	2-5

== Sun Belt vs. CFP AQ Conference matchups ==
Date	Visitor	Home	Conference	Score	Notes
August 28	Wake Forest	Louisiana-Monroe	ACC	W 17-10	
August 30	Appalachian State	Michigan	Big Ten	L 14-52	
August 30	Georgia Southern	NC State	ACC	L 23-24	
August 30	Idaho	Florida	SEC		Game canceled due to inclement weather
September 6	Arkansas State	Tennessee	SEC	L 19-34	
September 6	Duke	Troy	ACC	L 17-34	
September 13	Arkansas State	Miami	ACC	L 20-41	
September 13	Georgia Southern	Georgia Tech	ACC	L 38-41	
September 13	Louisiana-Lafayette	#14 Ole Miss	SEC	L 15-56	
September 13	Louisiana-Monroe	#10 LSU	SEC	L 0-31	
September 13	Mississippi State	South Alabama	SEC	L 3-35	
September 20	Georgia State	Washington	Pac-12	L 14-45	
September 20	Texas State	Illinois	Big Ten	L 35-42	
September 20	Troy	Georgia	SEC	L 0-66	
September 27	New Mexico State	#17 LSU	SEC	L 7-63	
October 11	Louisiana-Monroe	Kentucky	SEC	L 14–48	
November 1	Louisiana-Monroe	Texas A&M	SEC	L 16-21	
November 22	Georgia State	Clemson	ACC	L 0-28	
November 22	South Alabama	South Carolina	SEC	L 12-37	

== Regular season ==
Index to colors and formatting
Sun Belt member won
Sun Belt member lost
Sun Belt teams in **bold**

All dates, times, and TV are tentative and subject to change.

Start times for non-conference games are local for the Sun Belt team; for conference games, starting times are local for the home team. The following list are the teams in their respective time zones: Arkansas State, Louisiana–Monroe, Louisiana–Lafayette, South Alabama, Texas State and Troy are located in the Central Time Zone; Appalachian State, Georgia State, Georgia Southern is in the Eastern Time Zone; New Mexico State is in the Mountain Time Zone and Idaho is in the Pacific Time Zone.

Rankings reflect that of the USA Today Coaches poll for that week until week eight when the BCS poll will be used.

=== Week 1 ===
Date	Time	Visiting team	Home team	Site	TV	Result	Attendance
August 27	7:00 p.m.	Abilene Christian	**Georgia State**	Georgia Dome • Atlanta, GA	ESPNU	**W** 38-37	10,140
August 28	6:00 p.m.	Wake Forest	**Louisiana-Monroe**	Malone Stadium • Monroe, LA	ESPNU	**W** 17-10	21,003
August 28	6:00 p.m.	Cal Poly	**New Mexico State**	Aggie Memorial Stadium • Las Cruces, NM	ESPN3	**W** 28-10	13,772
August 30	11:00 a.m.	**Appalachian State**	Michigan	Michigan Stadium • Ann Arbor, MI	ESPN2	**L** 14-52	113,511
August 30	11:00 a.m.	**Troy**	UAB	Legion Field • Birmingham, AL	FCS	**L** 10-48	27,133
August 30	12:30 p.m.	**Georgia Southern**	NC State	Carter–Finley Stadium • Raleigh, NC	ACCN/ESPN3	**L** 23-24	54,273
August 30	4:00 p.m.	**Idaho**	Florida	Ben Hill Griffin Stadium • Gainesville, FL	ESPNU	Canceled due to weather	-
August 30	6:00 p.m.	#18 (FCS) Montana State	**Arkansas State**	Centennial Bank Stadium • Jonesboro, AR	ESPN3	**W** 37-10	26,143
August 30	6:00 p.m.	Southern	**Louisiana-Lafayette**	Cajun Field • Lafayette, LA	ESPN3	**W** 45-6	36,170
August 30	6:00 p.m.	Arkansas-Pine Bluff	**Texas State**	Bobcat Stadium • San Marcos, TX	ESPN3	**W** 65-0	17,813

- **Open Week: South Alabama**

Players of the week:

Offensive		Defensive		Special teams	
Player	Team	Player	Team	Player	Team
Tyler Jones	Texas State	Mitch Lane	UL Monroe	Luke Ferguson	Arkansas State

=== Week 2 ===
Date	Time	Visiting team	Home team	Site	TV	Result	Attendance
September 6	11:00 a.m.	**Arkansas State**	Tennessee	Neyland Stadium • Knoxville, TN	SEC Network	**L** 19-34	99,538
September 6	1:00 p.m.	**South Alabama**	Kent State	Dix Stadium • Kent, OH	ESPN3	**W** 23-13	15,355
September 6	2:00 p.m.	**New Mexico State**	**Georgia State**	Georgia Dome • Atlanta, GA	ESPN3	**NMSU** 34-31	10,126
September 6	6:00 p.m.	**Idaho**	**Louisiana–Monroe**	Malone Stadium • Monroe, LA	ESPN3	**ULM** 38-31	16,694
September 6	6:00 p.m.	Campbell	**Appalachian State**	Kidd Brewer Stadium • Boone, NC	ESPN3	**W** 66-0	25,861
September 6	6:00 p.m.	Savannah State	**Georgia Southern**	Paulson Stadium • Statesboro, GA	ESPN3	**W** 83-9	23,121
September 6	6:00 p.m.	Louisiana Tech	**Louisiana-Lafayette**	Cajun Field • Lafayette, LA	ESPN3	**L** 20-48	25,607
September 6	6:00 p.m.	Duke	**Troy**	Veterans Memorial Stadium • Troy, AL	ESPN3	**L** 17-34	21,331

- **Open Week: Texas State**

Players of the week:

Offensive		Defensive		Special teams	
Player	Team	Player	Team	Player	Team
Ajalen Holley	UL Monroe	Rodney Butler	New Mexico State	Maxwell Johnson	New Mexico State

=== Week 3 ===
Date	Time	Visiting team	Home team	Site	TV	Result	Attendance
September 13	12:00 p.m.	**Georgia Southern**	Georgia Tech	Bobby Dodd Stadium • Atlanta, GA	RSN/ESPN3	**L** 38-42	53,173
September 13	2:00 p.m.	Air Force	**Georgia State**	Georgia Dome • Atlanta, GA	ESPN3	**L** 38-45	16,836
September 13	2:00 p.m.	Western Michigan	**Idaho**	Kibbie Dome • Moscow, ID	ESPN3	**L** 33-45	14,721
September 13	2:30 p.m.	**Arkansas State**	Miami	Sun Life Stadium • Miami, FL	ESPNU	**L** 20-41	41,519
September 13	3:00 p.m.	**Louisiana–Lafayette**	Ole Miss	Vaught–Hemingway Stadium • Oxford, MS	SEC Network	**L** 15-56	60,937
September 13	3:00 p.m.	Mississippi State	**South Alabama**	Ladd–Peebles Stadium • Mobile, AL	ESPNews	**L** 3-35	38,129
September 13	6:00 p.m.	**Louisiana–Monroe**	LSU	Tiger Stadium • Baton Rouge, LA	ESPNU	**L** 0-31	101,194
September 13	6:00 p.m.	Abilene Christian	**Troy**	Veterans Memorial Stadium • Troy, AL	ESPN3	**L** 35-38	17,320
September 13	7:00 p.m.	**New Mexico State**	UTEP	Sun Bowl Stadium • El Paso, TX	ASN	**L** 24-42	32,979
September 13	7:00 p.m.	Navy	**Texas State**	Bobcat Stadium • San Marcos, TX	ESPNews	**L** 21-35	32,007

- **Open Week: Appalachian State**

Players of the week:

Offensive		Defensive		Special teams	
Player	Team	Player	Team	Player	Team
Kevin Ellison; Nick Arbuckle	Georgia Southern; Georgia State	Maleki Harris	South Alabama	Daniel Cadona	Louisiana-Lafayette

=== Week 4 ===
Date	Time	Visiting team	Home team	Site	TV	Result	Attendance
September 20	11:00 a.m.	**Troy**	Georgia	Sanford Stadium • Athens, GA	SEC Network	**L** 0-66	92,746
September 20	3:00 p.m.	**Texas State**	Illinois	Memorial Stadium • Champaign, IL	ESPNews	**L** 35-42	41,019
September 20	5:00 p.m.	**Idaho**	Ohio	Peden Stadium • Athens, OH	ESPN3	**L** 24-36	25,211
September 20	6:00 p.m.	Utah State	**Arkansas State**	Centennial Bank Stadium • Jonesboro, AR	ESPN3	**W** 21-14	29,029
September 20	6:00 p.m.	**Georgia State**	Washington	Husky Stadium • Seattle, WA	P12N	**L** 14-45	64,608
September 20	6:00 p.m.	New Mexico	**New Mexico State**	Aggie Memorial Stadium • Las Cruces, NM	ESPNGP	**L** 35-38	24,651
September 20	6:30 p.m.	**Georgia Southern**	**South Alabama**	Ladd–Peebles Stadium • Mobile, AL	ESPN3	**GASO** 28-6	11,348
September 20	7:00 p.m.	**Appalachian State**	Southern Miss	M.M. Roberts Stadium • Hattiesburg, MS	ASN	**L** 20-21	21,836
September 20	9:30 p.m.	**Louisiana-Lafayette**	Boise State	Albertsons Stadium • Boise, ID	CBSSN	**L** 9-34	33,337

- **Open Week: Louisiana-Monroe**

Players of the week:

Offensive		Defensive		Special teams	
Player	Team	Player	Team	Player	Team
Matt Breida	Georgia Southern	Qushaun Lee	Arkansas State	Artez Brown	Arkansas State

=== Week 5 ===
Date	Time	Visiting team	Home team	Site	TV	Result	Attendance
September 25	7:30 p.m.	**Appalachian State**	**Georgia Southern**	Paulson Stadium • Statesboro, GA	ESPNU	**GASO** 34-14	24,535
September 27	4:00 p.m.	**South Alabama**	**Idaho**	Kibbie Dome • Moscow, ID	ESPN3	**USA** 34-10	14,887
September 27	6:00 p.m.	**Troy**	**Louisiana-Monroe**	Malone Stadium • Monroe, LA	ESPN3/SBN	**ULM** 22-20	18,544
September 27	6:30 p.m.	**New Mexico State**	LSU	Tiger Stadium • Baton Rouge, LA	SEC Network	**L** 7-63	101,987
September 27	7:00 p.m.	**Texas State**	Tulsa	Skelly Field at H. A. Chapman Stadium • Tulsa, OK	ESPNews	**W** 37-34 (3OT)	21,353

- **Open Week: Arkansas State, Georgia State, Louisiana-Lafayette**

Players of the week:

Offensive		Defensive		Special teams	
Player	Team	Player	Team	Player	Team
Kevin Ellison (2)	Georgia Southern	David Mayo	Texas State	Justin Manton	Louisiana-Monroe

=== Week 6 ===
Date	Time	Visiting team	Home team	Site	TV	Result	Attendance
October 4	6:00 p.m.	**South Alabama**	**Appalachian State**	Kidd Brewer Stadium • Boone, NC	ESPN3/SBN	**USA** 47-21	24,215
October 4	6:00 p.m.	**Georgia State**	**Louisiana-Lafayette**	Cajun Field • Lafayette, LA	ESPN3	**ULL** 34-31	24,616
October 4	6:00 p.m.	**Idaho**	**Texas State**	Bobcat Stadium • San Marcos, TX	ESPN3	**TXST** 35-30	21,345
October 4	6:00 p.m.	**Louisiana-Monroe**	**Arkansas State**	Centennial Bank Stadium • Jonesboro, AR	ESPN3	**ARST** 28-14	29,317
October 4	7:00 p.m.	**Georgia Southern**	**New Mexico State**	Aggie Memorial Stadium • Las Cruces, NM	ESPN3	**GASO** 36-28	10,256

- **Open Week: Troy**

Players of the week:

Offensive		Defensive		Special teams	
Player	Team	Player	Team	Player	Team
Terrence Franks	Texas State	Craig Mager	Texas State	Wil Lutz	Georgia State

=== Week 7 ===
Date	Time	Visiting team	Home team	Site	TV	Result	Attendance
October 11	1:00 p.m.	**Arkansas State**	**Georgia State**	Georgia Dome • Atlanta, GA	ESPN3	**ARST** 52–10	10,196
October 11	2:00 p.m.	**New Mexico State**	**Troy**	Veterans Memorial Stadium • Troy, AL	ESPN3	**Troy** 41–24	17,628
October 11	5:00 p.m.	**Idaho**	**Georgia Southern**	Paulson Stadium • Statesboro, GA	ESPN3	**GASO** 47-24	23,250
October 11	2:30 p.m.	Liberty	**Appalachian State**	Kidd Brewer Stadium • Boone, NC	ESPN3	**L** 48–55 (OT)	26,058
October 11	11:00 a.m.	**Louisiana-Monroe**	Kentucky	Commonwealth Stadium • Lexington, KY	SECN	**L** 14–48	56,676

- **Open Week: Louisiana-Lafayette, South Alabama, Texas State**

Players of the week:

Offensive		Defensive		Special teams	
Player	Team	Player	Team	Player	Team
Fredi Knighten	Arkansas State	Jamal Stadom	Troy	Chandler Worthy	Troy

=== Week 8 ===
Date	Time	Visiting team	Home team	Site	TV	Result	Attendance
October 14	7:00 p.m.	**Louisiana-Lafayette**	**Texas State**	Bobcat Stadium • San Marcos, TX	ESPN2	**ULL** 34-10	18,509
October 18	2:00 p.m.	**Appalachian State**	**Troy**	Veterans Memorial Stadium • Troy, AL	ESPN3	**APPST** 53-14	15,664
October 18	4:00 p.m.	**New Mexico State**	**Idaho**	Kibbie Dome • Moscow, ID	ESPN3	**Idaho** 29-17	15,207
October 18	TBA	**Georgia State**	**South Alabama**	Ladd–Peebles Stadium • Mobile, AL	ESPN3	**USA** 30-27	13,186

- **Open Week: Arkansas State, Georgia Southern, Louisiana-Monroe**

Players of the week:

Offensive		Defensive		Special teams	
Player	Team	Player	Team	Player	Team
Brandon Bridge	South Alabama	Christian Ringo	Louisiana-Lafayette	Austin Rehkow	Idaho

=== Week 9 ===
Date	Time	Visiting team	Home team	Site	TV	Result	Attendance
October 21	7:00 p.m.	**Arkansas State**	**Louisiana-Lafayette**	Cajun Field • Lafayette, LA	ESPN2	**ULL** 55–40	21,760
October 24	6:30 p.m.	**Troy**	**South Alabama**	Ladd–Peebles Stadium • Mobile, AL	ESPNU	**USA** 27–13	17,146
October 25	6:00 p.m.	**Texas State**	**Louisiana-Monroe**	Malone Stadium • Monroe, LA	ESPN3	**TXST** 22–18	14,755
October 25	1:00 p.m.	**Georgia Southern**	**Georgia State**	Georgia Dome • Atlanta, GA	ESPN3	**GASO** 69–31	28,427

- **Open Week: Appalachian State, Idaho, New Mexico State**

Players of the week:

Offensive		Defensive		Special teams	
Player	Team	Player	Team	Player	Team
Elijah McGuire	Louisiana-Lafayette	David Mayo (2)	Texas State	Daniel Cadona (2)	Louisiana-Lafayette

=== Week 10 ===
Date	Time	Visiting team	Home team	Site	TV	Result	Attendance
October 30	6:30 p.m.	Troy	**Georgia Southern**	Paulson Stadium • Statesboro, GA	ESPNU	**GASO** 42–10	18,321
November 1	11:00 a.m.	Louisiana-Monroe	Texas A&M	Kyle Field • College Station, TX	SECN	**L** 16–21	100,922
November 1	2:30 p.m.	Georgia State	**Appalachian State**	Kidd Brewer Stadium • Boone, NC	ESPN3	**APPST** 44–0	22,643
November 1	3:00 p.m.	Texas State	**New Mexico State**	Aggie Memorial Stadium • Las Cruces, NM	ESPN3	**TXST** 37–29	8,623
November 1	4:00 p.m.	Arkansas State	**Idaho**	Kibbie Dome • Moscow, ID	ESPN3	**ARST** 44–28	11,082
November 1	4:00 p.m.	South Alabama	**Louisiana-Lafayette**	Cajun Field • Lafayette, LA	ESPN3	**ULL** 19–9	25,861

Players of the week:

Offensive		Defensive		Special teams	
Player	Team	Player	Team	Player	Team
Marcus Cox	App State	Ja'Von Rolland-Jones	Arkansas State	Terrence Franks	Texas State

=== Week 11 ===
Date	Time	Visiting team	Home team	Site	TV	Result	Attendance
November 8	2:00 p.m.	Georgia State	**Troy**	Veterans Memorial Stadium • Troy, AL	ESPN3	**Troy** 45–21	16,418
November 8	2:00 p.m.	South Alabama	**Arkansas State**	Centennial Bank Stadium • Jonesboro, AR	ESPN3	**ARST** 45–10	23,615
November 8	2:30 p.m.	Louisiana-Monroe	**Appalachian State**	Kidd Brewer Stadium • Boone, NC	ESPN3	**APPST** 31–29	20,497
November 8	3:00 p.m.	Georgia Southern	**Texas State**	Bobcat Stadium • San Marcos, TX	ESPN3	**GASO** 28–25	16,772
November 8	5:30 p.m.	Idaho	San Diego State	Qualcomm Stadium • San Diego, CA	Root Sports	**L** 21–35	46,293
November 8	7:00 p.m.	Louisiana-Lafayette	**New Mexico State**	Aggie Memorial Stadium • Las Cruces, NM	ESPN3	**ULL** 44–16	10,299

Players of the week:

Offensive		Defensive		Special teams	
Player	Team	Player	Team	Player	Team
Taylor Lamb	App State	Matt Dobson	Georgia Southern	Bentlee Critcher	App State

=== Week 12 ===
Date	Time	Visiting team	Home team	Site	TV	Result	Attendance
November 15	2:00 p.m.	**Appalachian State**	**Arkansas State**	Centennial Bank Stadium • Jonesboro, AR	ESPN3	**APPST** 37-32	20,016
November 15	2:30 p.m.	**Georgia Southern**	Navy	Navy–Marine Corps Memorial Stadium • Annapolis, MD	CBSSN	**L** 19-52	33,894
November 15	4:00 p.m.	**Troy**	**Idaho**	Kibbie Dome • Moscow, ID	ESPN3	**Troy** 34-17	8,535
November 15	6:00 p.m.	**Louisiana-Lafayette**	**Louisiana-Monroe**	Malone Stadium • Monroe, LA	ESPN3	**ULL** 34-27	19,544
November 15	6:30 p.m.	**Texas State**	**South Alabama**	Ladd–Peebles Stadium • Mobile, AL	ESPN3	**USA** 24-20	10,289

- **Open Week: Georgia State, New Mexico State**

Players of the week:

Offensive		Defensive		Special teams	
Player	Team	Player	Team	Player	Team
Marcus Cox (2)	Appalachian State	Montres Kitchens	Troy	Blaise Taylor	Arkansas State

=== Week 13 ===
Date	Time	Visiting team	Home team	Site	TV	Result	Attendance
November 20	8:30 p.m.	**Arkansas State**	**Texas State**	Bobcat Stadium • San Marcos, TX	ESPNU	**TXST** 45-27	12,264
November 22	11:00 a.m.	**South Alabama**	South Carolina	Williams-Brice Stadium • Columbia, SC	FSN	**L** 12-37	78,201
November 22	1:00 p.m.	**Appalachian State**	**Louisiana-Lafayette**	Cajun Field • Lafayette, LA	ESPN3	**APPST** 35-16	20,638
November 22	2:30 p.m.	**Georgia State**	Clemson	Memorial Stadium • Clemson, SC	ACCN	**L** 0-28	77,693
November 22	3:00 p.m.	**Louisiana-Monroe**	**New Mexico State**	Aggie Memorial Stadium • Las Cruces, NM	ESPN3	**ULM** 45-27	6,011

- **Open Week: Georgia Southern, Idaho, Troy**

Players of the week:

Offensive		Defensive		Special teams	
Player	Team	Player	Team	Player	Team
Robert Lowe	Texas State	Michael Johnson	Louisiana–Monore	Bobo Beathard; Justin Manton	Appalachian State; Louisiana–Monore

=== Week 14 ===
Date	Time	Visiting team	Home team	Site	TV	Result	Attendance
November 28	2:00 p.m.	Navy	South Alabama	Ladd–Peebles Stadium • Mobile, AL	ESPN3	**L** 40–42	14,571
November 29	11:30 a.m.	**Louisiana-Lafayette**	Troy	Veterans Memorial Stadium • Troy, AL	ESPN3	**ULL** 42–23	12,241
November 29	1:00 p.m.	**Texas State**	Georgia State	Georgia Dome • Atlanta, GA	ESPN3	**TXST** 51–34	14,312
November 29	1:00 p.m.	**Idaho**	Appalachian State	Kidd Brewer Stadium • Boone, NC	ESPN3	**APPST** 45–28	19,271
November 29	2:00 p.m.	**New Mexico State**	Arkansas State	Centennial Bank Stadium • Jonesboro, AR	ESPN3	**ARST** 68–35	21,043
November 29	5:00 p.m.	**Louisiana-Monroe**	Georgia Southern	Paulson Stadium • Statesboro, GA	ESPN3	**GASO** 22–16	16,283

Players of the week:

Offensive		Defensive		Special teams	
Player	Team	Player	Team	Player	Team
Fredi Knighten	Arkansas State	John Law	Appalachian State	Will Johnson	Texas State

== Bowl games ==
In 2014, the SBC placed three teams in bowl games through their tie-ins: Louisiana–Lafayette, Arkansas State, and South Alabama. Texas State was also bowl-eligible but did not receive a bowl invitation. Georgia Southern and Appalachian State, despite having bowl-eligible records (9-3 and 7–5, respectively) and the former winning the conference championship, were not bowl-eligible due to FCS-to-FBS transition rules, since 81 full FBS members became bowl-eligible for the 76 bowl slots available.

Note: All times are local

Bowl	Date	Time	SBC team (Record)	Opponent (Record)	Site	TV	Result	Attendance
2014 R+L Carriers New Orleans Bowl	December 20	11:00 a.m.	Louisiana–Lafayette (8-4)	Nevada (7-5)	Mercedes-Benz Superdome • New Orleans, LA	ESPN	W 16–3	34,014
2014 Raycom Media Camellia Bowl	December 20	9:15 p.m.	South Alabama (6-6)	Bowling Green (7-6)	Cramton Bowl • Montgomery, AL	ESPN	L 28-33	20,246
2015 GoDaddy Bowl	January 4	9:00 p.m.	Arkansas State (7-5)	Toledo (8-4)	Ladd–Peebles Stadium • Mobile, AL	ESPN	L 44-63	36,811

== Players of the Year ==
2014 Sun Belt Player of the Year awards

Award	Player	School
Player of the Year	Elijah McGuire	Louisiana-Lafayette
Offensive Player of the Year	Elijah McGuire	Louisiana-Lafayette
Defensive Player of the Year	David Mayo	Texas State
Freshman of the Year	Taylor Lamb	Appalachian State
Coach of the Year	Willie Fritz	Georgia Southern

== All-Conference Players ==
Coaches All-Conference Selections

Position	Player	Class	Team
First Team Offense
QB	Fredi Knighten	JR	Arkansas State
RB	Matt Breida	SO	Georgia Southern
RB	Elijah McGuire	SO	Louisiana-Lafayette
WR	Donovan Harden	JR	Georgia State
WR	Joshua McCain	SR	Idaho
WR	Rashon Ceaser	JR	Louisiana-Monroe
TE	Brad Miller	SR	Texas State
OL	Kendall Lamm	SR	Appalachian State
OL	Garrett Frye	SR	Georgia Southern
OL	Manrey Saint-Amour	SR	Georgia Southern
OL	Daniel Quave	SR	Louisiana-Lafayette
OL	Valerian Ume-Ezeoke	SR	New Mexico State
First Team Defense
DL	Justin Hamilton	SR	Louisiana-Lafayette
DL	Christian Ringo	SR	Louisiana-Lafayette
DL	Gerrand Johnson	JR	Louisiana-Monroe
DL	Michael Odiari	SR	Texas State
LB	Qushaun Lee	SR	Arkansas State
LB	Edwin Jackson	SR	Georgia Southern
LB	David Mayo	SR	Texas State
LB	Doug Middleton	JR	Appalachian State
DB	Artez Brown	SR	Arkansas State
DB	Mitch Lane	JR	Louisiana-Monroe
DB	Montres Kitchens	JR	Troy
DB	David Mims	JR	Texas State
First Team Special Teams
PK	Justin Manton	SR	Louisiana-Monroe
P	Austin Rehkow	SO	Idaho
RS	Chandler Worthy	SR	Troy
AP	Elijah McGuire	SO	Louisiana-Lafayette

Position	Player	Class	Team
Second Team Offense
QB	Kevin Ellison	SO	Georgia Southern
RB	Marcus Cox	SO	Appalachian State
RB	Michael Gordon	JR	Arkansas State
WR	Ajalen Holley	SO	Louisiana-Monroe
WR	Teldrick Morgan	SO	New Mexico State
WR	Shavarez Smith	SR	South Alabama
TE	Joel Ruiz	JR	Georgia State
OL	Mike Marboe	SR	Idaho
OL	Mykhael Quave	JR	Louisiana-Lafayette
OL	Ucambre Williams	SR	South Alabama
OL	Terrence Jones	SR	Troy
OL	Adrian Bellard	JR	Texas State
Second Team Defense
DL	Ronald Blair	JR	Appalachian State
DL	Javon Rolland-Jones	FR	Arkansas State
DL	Jerome McClain	SR	South Alabama
DL	Theo Rich	SR	South Alabama
LB	John Law	SO	Appalachian State
LB	Joseph Peterson	JR	Georgia State
LB	Hunter Kissinger	JR	Louisiana-Monroe
LB	Maleki Harris	SR	South Alabama
DB	Matt Dobson	JR	Georgia Southern
DB	Corey Trim	SR	Louisiana-Lafayette
DB	Terrell Brigham	SR	South Alabama
DB	Craig Mager	SR	Texas State
Second Team Special Teams
PK	Hunter Stover	SR	Louisiana-Lafayette
P	Justin Manton	SR	Louisiana-Monroe
RS	Blaise Taylor	FR	Arkansas State
AP	Chandler Worthy	SR	Troy

Honorable Mention: Appalachian State: Drew Bailey, Parker Collins, Kennan Gilchrist, Joel Ross; Arkansas State: Tres Houston, Chris Stone, Andrew Tyron, Xavier Woodson; Georgia Southern: Logan Daves, Deion Stanley, Jay Ellison, Antwione Williams; Georgia State: Nick Arbuckle, Tim Wynn, LynQuez Blair, Robert Davis; Idaho: Marc Millan, Quinton Bradley, Matt Linehan, Elijhaa Penny; Louisiana-Lafayette: Tominique Tovell, Larry Pettis, Terrance Broadway, Terry Johnson; Louisiana-Monroe: Trey Caldwell, Kenzee Jackson, Michael Johnson, Ray Stovall; New Mexico State: Rodney Butler, Winston Rose, Larry Rose III, Derek Ibekwe; South Alabama Chris May, Melvin Meggs, Jesse Kelley, Montell Garner; Texas State: Will Johnson, Tyler Jones, Robert Lowe, Ryan Melton; Troy: Dalton Bennett, Brandon Burks, Tyler Roberts, Bryan Holmes.

== Home attendance ==
Team	Stadium (Capacity)	Game 1	Game 2	Game 3	Game 4	Game 5	Game 6	Total	Average	% of Capacity
Appalachian State	Kidd Brewer Stadium (24,050)	25,861	24,215	26,058	22,643	20,497	19,271	138,545	23,091	96.0%
Arkansas State	Centennial Bank Stadium (30,964)	26,143	29,029	29,317	23,615	20,016	21,043	149,163	24,861	80.3%
Georgia Southern	Paulson Stadium (25,000)	23,121	24,535	23,250	18,321	16,283	N/A	105,510	21,102	84.4%
Georgia State	Georgia Dome (28,155)	10,140	10,126	16,836	10,196	28,427	14,312	90,037	15,006	53.3%
Idaho	Kibbie Dome (16,000)	14,721	14,887	15,207	11,082	8,535	N/A	64,432	12,886	80.5%
Louisiana–Lafayette	Cajun Field (36,900)	36,170	25,607	24,616	21,760	25,861	20,638	154,652	25,775	70.0%
Louisiana–Monroe	Malone Stadium (30,427)	21,003	16,694	18,544	14,755	19,544	N/A	90,540	18,108	59.5%
New Mexico State	Aggie Memorial Stadium (30,343)	13,772	24,651	10,256	8,623	10,299	6,011	73,612	12,269	40.4%
South Alabama	Ladd–Peebles Stadium (33,471)	38,129	11,348	13,186	17,146	10,289	14,571	104,639	17,440	52.1%
Texas State	Bobcat Stadium (30,000)	17,813	32,007	21,345	18,509	16,772	12,264	118,710	19,785	66.0%
Troy	Veterans Memorial Stadium (30,000)	21,331	17,320	17,628	15,664	16,418	12,241	100,602	16,767	55.9%

== NFL draft ==
The following list includes all Sun Belt players who were drafted in the 2015 NFL draft.

Round #	Pick #	NFL team	Player	Position	College
3	83	San Diego Chargers	Craig Mager	CB	Texas State
5	169	Carolina Panthers	David Mayo	LB	Texas State
6	210	Green Bay Packers	Christian Ringo	DE	Louisiana–Lafayette
