= Edwin Jackson (American football) =

American football player (1991–2018)

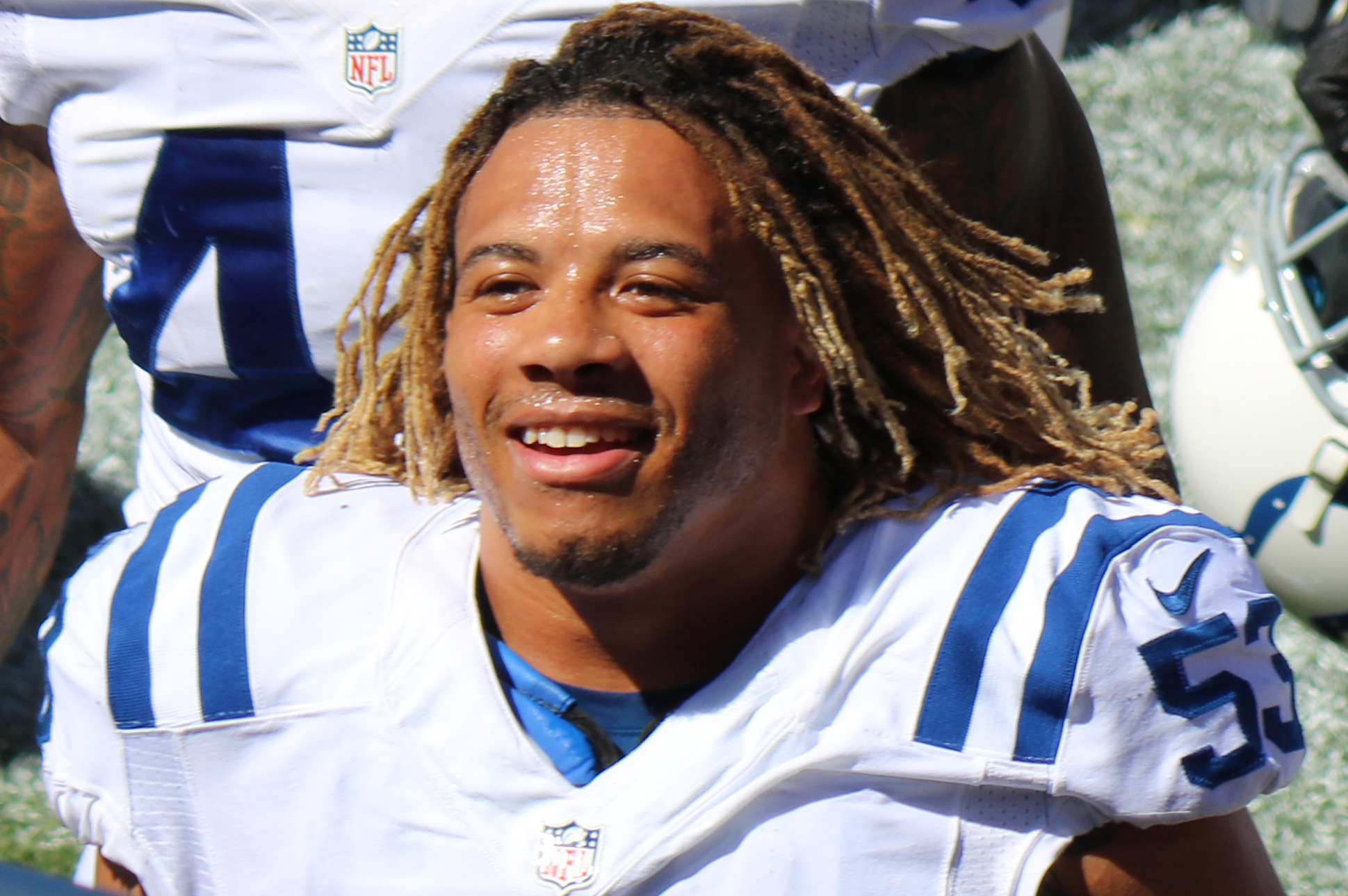
- Jackson with the Indianapolis Colts in 2016

No. 53
- Position: Linebacker

Personal information
- Born: December 19, 1991; Atlanta, Georgia, U.S.
- Died: February 4, 2018 (aged 26); Indianapolis, Indiana, U.S.
- Listed height: 6 ft 0 in (1.83 m)
- Listed weight: 234 lb (106 kg)

Career information
- High school: Westlake (Atlanta, Georgia)
- College: Georgia Southern
- NFL draft: 2015: undrafted

Career history
- Arizona Cardinals (2015)*; Indianapolis Colts (2015–2017)
- * Offseason or practice squad member only

Awards and highlights
- First-team All-Sun Belt (2014)

Career NFL statistics
- Total tackles: 66
- Sacks: 2
- Stats at Pro Football Reference

Edwin Joseph Jackson (December 19, 1991 – February 4, 2018) was an American professional football linebacker. He played college football at Georgia Southern University. He signed with the Arizona Cardinals of the National Football League (NFL) as an undrafted free agent in 2015, and then spent two seasons with the Indianapolis Colts.

== Early life ==
Jackson attended Westlake High School in his hometown of Atlanta, Georgia, where he was a letterman in football and wrestling. In football, he played the position of linebacker, kicker, and punter.

Jackson was a 5A Georgia High School State Championship finalist in Wrestling at the 189 lb weight division. He won regional championships his junior and senior years.

== College career ==
Making the Georgia Southern Football Team as a tryout walk-on, Jackson saw action in 13 games as a freshman, and had 10 tackles. He played in 12 games as a sophomore in 2012, collecting 16 tackles and six special teams tackles. Earning the starting middle linebacker spot his junior season, Jackson totaled a team-best 92 tackles, 2.0 sacks and a fumble recovery in 11 games. A highlight game that year featured Jackson posting 10 tackles, including a team-leading eight solo stops in 26–20 upset win against the University of Florida. Jackson was named the College Sports Madness Southern Conference Player of the Week for his performance against the Florida Gators.

In Jackson's senior year, he was voted team captain by his teammates, and recorded a career-high 100 tackles, which ranked in the top- 10 of the Sun Belt Conference. He had four games with 13-plus tackles. Jackson also had a forced fumble and an interception, which helped seal a win at South Alabama. Jackson helped Georgia Southern win the Sun Belt Conference Championship in the school's inaugural year competing on the NCAA Football Bowl Subdivision (FBS) level in 2014. He was awarded First-team All-Sun Belt honors.

Jackson was nominated for the Burlsworth Trophy, which nationally honors former walk-on players who have made significant contributions to their school's team. He was also nominated for the Wuerffel Trophy, which acknowledges players who show exemplary community service with athletic and academic achievement. Also, Jackson was nominated for AllState Good Works Team for his volunteer work at a local Statesboro elementary school, and hosting a football clinic for children in Costa Rica during his Christmas break. Lastly, Jackson competed in the prestigious Medal of Honor Senior Bowl in Charleston, SC after completing his senior year.

== Professional career ==
Pre-draft measurables
| Height | Weight | Arm length | Hand span | Wingspan | 40-yard dash | 10-yard split | 20-yard split | 20-yard shuttle | Three-cone drill | Vertical jump | Broad jump | Bench press |
|---|---|---|---|---|---|---|---|---|---|---|---|---|
| 5 ft 11 1/8 in (1.81 m) | 228 lb (103 kg) | 31 3/8 in (0.80 m) | 9 1/4 in (0.23 m) | 6 ft 2 5/8 in (1.90 m) | 4.80 s | 1.66 s | 2.74 s | 4.40 s | 7.15 s | 35.5 in (0.90 m) | 10 ft 0 in (3.05 m) | 30 reps |
All values from Pro Day

=== Arizona Cardinals ===
Jackson was signed by the Arizona Cardinals as an undrafted free agent on May 5, 2015. Prior to signing with the team at his initial meeting with Cardinals coaching staff, he brought pound cakes homemade by his mother as an apology for missing his scheduled flight - this earned Jackson the nickname "Pound Cake" that stayed with him throughout his professional career. He was released on August 31, 2015 after competing in the 2015 Cardinals' preseason games.

=== Indianapolis Colts ===
On December 8, 2015, Jackson was signed to the practice squad of the Indianapolis Colts. He was released on December 16, 2015 and re-signed on December 22. He signed a reserve/future contract with the Colts on January 5, 2016.

In 2016, Jackson played in all 16 games with 8 starts, recording 66 tackles.

On September 2, 2017, Jackson was placed on injured reserve.

== Death ==
On February 4, 2018, Jackson was a passenger of Uber driver Jeffrey Monroe, 54, when Jackson suddenly felt ill and asked if the two could pull over. Just before 4 a.m., the two men exited the vehicle along the westbound lanes of Interstate 70 in Indianapolis. While on the shoulder, Jackson and Monroe were struck by a Ford F-150 pickup truck, which veered into the emergency lane. Both Jackson and Monroe died at the scene. The driver, Manuel Orrego-Savala, 37, of Guatemala, was arrested after trying to flee the scene on foot, according to the Indiana State Police. Orrego-Savala was in the country illegally, having already been deported on two occasions, in 2007 and 2009.

Authorities reported that Orrego-Savala was driving without a license and had a blood alcohol concentration of 0.239, nearly three times the legal limit of 0.08 to drive in Indiana. Initially identifying himself to police as Alex Cabrera-Gonsales, he had previously been convicted of drunk driving in California in 2005.

On February 7, 2018, Manuel Orrego-Savala was charged by the Marion County prosecutor with four felony counts: two counts of causing death while operating a vehicle above the legal alcohol limit, and two counts of failing to remain at the scene of an accident. The previous day, he was charged in federal court with illegal re-entry of a previously deported person.

On September 21, 2018, Manuel Orrego-Savala was sentenced to the maximum of 16 years in prison after pleading guilty on July 20, 2018 to two counts of operating a motor vehicle with a blood alcohol content of 0.15 or more, causing death.

== See also ==
- List of gridiron football players who died during their careers
