= Lakeview Centennial High School =

Location
- 3505 Hayman Drive; Garland, Dallas County, Texas 75043-1920; United States; 32°51′22″N 96°34′36″W

Information
- School type: Public high school
- Motto: More than a Diploma.
- Established: 1976
- School district: Garland Independent School District
- Superintendent: Ricardo López
- Principal: Elise Mosty
- Faculty: 144.05 (FTE)
- Grades: 9–12
- Enrollment: 2,142 (2023–2024)
- Student to teacher ratio: 14.87
- Language: English
- Colors: Blue and gold
- Athletics: UIL 6A
- Mascot: Patriots
- Website: www.garlandisdschools.net/lchs

Lakeview Centennial High School is a public secondary school in Garland, Texas, United States. It enrolls students in grades 9–12 and is a part of the Garland Independent School District.

The school's name derives from two sources: "Lakeview" from its location near Lake Ray Hubbard and "Centennial" as it opened during the American bicentennial year of 1976.

== Notable alumni ==
- Derrick Dockery, Former NFL football player
- Samuel Eguavoen, Former NFL football player
- Anu Emmanuel, Actress
- William Jackson Harper, Actor: best known for his role as Chidi Anagonye on the NBC comedy The Good Place (2016-2020)
- Chris Jones (born 1993), basketball player for Maccabi Tel Aviv of the Israeli Basketball Premier League
- Scott Kirby, CEO of United Airlines
- James Lankford, United States Senator (R-OK)
- Keith Mitchell, former NFL player
- Adrienne Reese, professional wrestler Athena, currently of All Elite Wrestling and Ring of Honor, previously known as Ember Moon in WWE
- Dean Sams, founding member of Lonestar
- Stacy Sanches, 1996 Playboy Playmate of the Year
- Zhaire Smith, NBA basketball player
- Valerian Ume-Ezeoke, NFL player
- Chris Warren, Liga Nacional de Baloncesto Profesional basketball player
- Joe West, former professional football player
