= Mary Virginia Proctor =

American journalist and activist

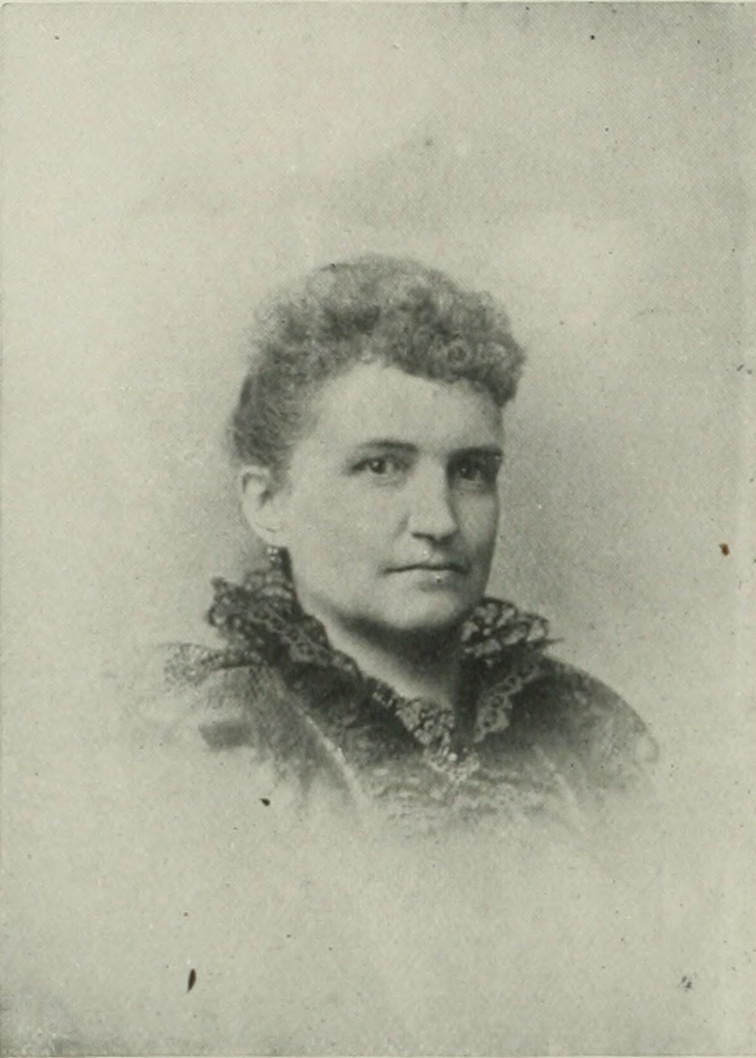
- "A Woman of the Century"
- Born: Mary Virginia Swindler; May 1854; Rappahannock County, Virginia, U.S.
- Died: July 3, 1927 (aged 73); Williamsburg, Virginia, U.S.
- Other name: Mary Virginia Wilson
- Education: Xenia Female College
- Occupations: journalist; activist; philanthropist
- Spouse: Thomas Meigher Proctor (m. 1879; died 1891) Dillon Brook Wilson (m. 1896; died 1918)
- Children: Merrill Anne Proctor

Mary Virginia Proctor (née, Swindler; after first marriage, Proctor; after second marriage, Wilson; May 1854 – July 3, 1927) was an American journalist, philanthropist, and social activist. For more than 30 years, she was owner and editor of an influential democratic newspaper. Meanwhile, she was active in Ohio state politics and for many years, served on important state boards. For several years, she held the position of president of the Ohio Newspaper Women's Association.

== Early life and education ==
Mary Virginia Swindler was born in a quaint old homestead on a farm in Rappahannock County, Virginia, in May 1854. Her parents were Capt. James William Swindler (1826–1905) and Louisa ("Lucy") Catherine Johnson (1826–1882). Mary's siblings were: John, Henry, James, Adalade, Richard, Edwin, Emma, Ellen, and Adda ("Addie"). Her uncles were General Aylette A. Swindler, C.S.A. and Captain Albert C. Swindler, C.S.A.

In 1858, her parents removed to Greene County, Ohio, and settled upon a farm, where Mary grew to adulthood, receiving her education in a rural school. When scarcely fifteen years of age, she began teaching neighborhood schools, but, after two years, feeling the necessity of a broader education, she entered the Xenia Female College, a Methodist institution, where in eighteen months, she was graduated.

== Career ==
=== Journalist ===
After her graduation, Proctor was engaged as a teacher in the Ohio Soldiers' and Sailors' Orphans' Home, in Xenia, Ohio. In her capacity as teacher, she served in that institution until 1879. At the time of her incumbency, Thomas Meigher Proctor was engaged in editing the Home Weekly, a paper devoted to the interests of the institution, and was connected with many of the leading daily journals of the country. Their acquaintance ended in marriage on November 27, 1879, in the Ohio Soldiers' and Sailors' Orphans' Home.

After the marriage, Mr. Proctor continued the management of the Home Weekly for nearly a year, when they removed to Wilmington, Ohio, where he became the editor and proprietor of the Clinton County Democrat. Merrill Anne Proctor, their only child, was born in Wilmington. They continued to live in Wilmington until 1883, and during that time, Mrs. Proctor contributed many articles to the Clinton County Democrat.

In 1883, they removed to Lebanon, Ohio, where they commenced the management of the Lebanon Patriot, its prosperity attributed to the ability of Mrs. Proctor. After Mr. Proctor died on July 13, 1891, the widow assumed the management of the paper. Her firm adherence to the standards and tenets of the Democratic party placed the paper in the front ranks of literary journalism and also made it a leading party organ. Although it was not always easy for Proctor, her thorough understanding of political issues made her a leader in Warren County politics. Democrats generally recognized this fact and often accepted her judgment and far-sighted opinions while others were prone to chafe under her directorship. Firm, uncompromising in her attitude towards all political chicanery, she yet remained respected by all citizens. In addition, she was a regular contributor to The Cincinnati Enquirer, and furnished many articles to other dailies and magazines.

Proctor's newspaper work received recognition from the journalists of the state. City papers offered inducements for her to join their staff of writers. But she loved her home in Lebanon and remained there.

In 1894, during the administration of President Grover Cleveland, a vacancy occurring in the Lebanon post office. Proctor decided that she could fill the place acceptably, procured the required recommendations, secured the appointment, and filled the position.

=== Activist ===
Proctor was zealous in the temperance cause. From the day of its first issue, her newspaper was conscientiously devoted to the overthrow of the saloon, and her paper proved a strong agency in the Miami valley for prohibition. It was mainly through the efficient work of Proctor, both personally and editorially, that her town went "dry" under the Beal law.

Another field of activity in which Proctor devoted her energies was the equal suffrage cause. She has won many "votes for women", not only through her clear statements and logical facts as presented through the Patriot, but more by the capability she evinced as a bread-winner.

=== Philanthropist ===
Her philanthropy and executive ability procured state recognition. For more than fifteen years, she served on the board of lady visitors of the Ohio Soldiers' and Sailors' Orphans' home, receiving her appointment from two separate governors. Other state institutions also placed under her oversight as a state inspector into their needs and management. She was asked to take charge of the Girls' Industrial home at Delaware, Ohio, for she was recognized as one of the best sociological thinkers and workers in the state of Ohio. The duties of probation officer of Warren county were also entrusted to her.

== Personal life ==
Mary's first marriage was to Thomas Meigher Proctor on November 27, 1879. Merrill Anne Proctor, their only child, was born in Wilmington.

On October 7, 1896, Proctor married Dillon Brook Wilson (1851–1918), a prominent lawyer of Lebanon.

She united with the Methodist Episcopal Church in early life and a part of her time was devoted to its cause.

Mary Swindler Proctor Wilson died July 3, 1927, at the home of her daughter in Williamsburg, Virginia. She had been in declining health for some time, and had broken a hip four weeks earlier after a fall. She was buried in Lebanon, Ohio.
