= Valerian Ume-Ezeoke =

American football player and coach (born 1993)

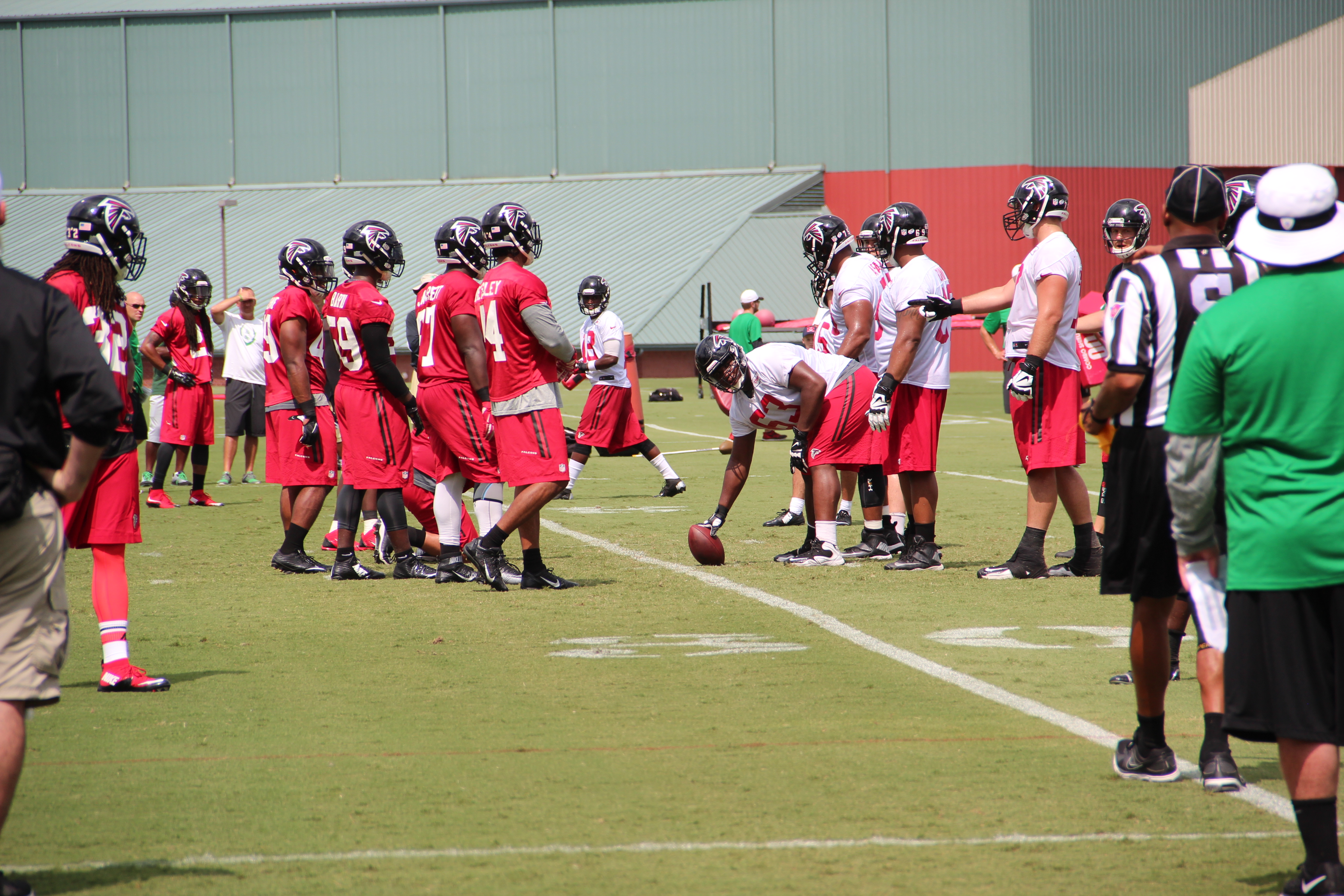
- Valerian Ume-Ezeoke (63) during Atlanta Falcons Mini-Camp

Boise State Broncos
- Title: Graduate assistant

Personal information
- Born: February 14, 1993 (age 33); Garland, Texas
- Listed height: 6 ft 3 in (1.91 m)
- Listed weight: 295 lb (134 kg)

Career information
- High school: Garland (TX) Lakeview Centennial
- College: New Mexico State
- NFL draft: 2015: undrafted

Career history

Playing
- Atlanta Falcons (2015)*; Arizona Cardinals (2016)*; Pittsburgh Steelers (2016)
- * Offseason or practice squad member only

Coaching
- UMass Minutemen; Boise State

Awards and highlights
- First-team All-Sun Belt (2014)
- Stats at Pro Football Reference

Valerian Ume-Ezeoke // (born February 14, 1993) is an American former football center. He is now a graduate assistant for the UMass Minutemen football program. He played college football at New Mexico State University.

== Early life ==
Born the son of Anthony and Tina Ume-Ezeoke, Valerian attended Lakeview Centennial High School in Garland, Texas, where he was a member of the Patriots football team. Ume-Ezeoke played both offensive and defensive line for the Patriots, earning an All-State as a sophomore and junior.

=== Recruiting ===
Ume-Ezeoke committed to New Mexico State University on September 2, 2010. He choose New Mexico State over football scholarships from the United States Air Force Academy, Colorado State University, and Tennessee State University.

College recruiting
Name	Hometown	School	Height	Weight	40^{‡}	Commit date
Valerian Ume-Ezeoke; C	Garland, Texas	Lakeview Centennial High School	6 ft 2 in (1.88 m)	267 lb (121 kg)	–-	Sep 2, 2010
Valerian Ume-Ezeoke; C	Recruit ratings: Scout: Rivals:					
Overall recruit ranking: Scout: 36 (C) Rivals: –- (C), –- (TX)
‡ Refers to 40-yard dash; Note: In many cases, Scout, Rivals, 247Sports, On3, and ESPN may conflict in their listings of height, weight and 40 time.; In these cases, the average was taken. ESPN grades are on a 100-point scale.; Sources: "2011 Team Ranking". Rivals.com.

== College career ==
Ume-Ezeoke came in played in 8 games as a true freshman, starting six of those games. As a sophomore, Ume-Ezeoke started all 12 games for the Aggies. Ume-Ezeoke was named to the Rimington Trophy watch list as a junior, again starting all 12 games for the Aggies. As a senior in 2014, Ume-Ezeoke was once again added to the Rimington Tropher watch list and earned All-Sun Belt Conference First Team as an offensive lineman.

== Professional career ==
Prior to the 2015 NFL draft, Ume-Ezeoke was projected to be undrafted by NFLDraftScout.com. He was rated as the twentieth-best center in the draft.

Pre-draft measurables
Height	Weight	Arm length	40-yard dash	10-yard split	20-yard split	20-yard shuttle	Three-cone drill	Vertical jump	Broad jump	Bench press
6 ft 2 in (1.88 m)	302 lb (137 kg)	32.12 in (0.82 m)	5.45 s	1.75 s	3.10 s	4.82 s	8.15 s	30 in (0.76 m)	8 ft 10 in (2.69 m)	25 reps
All values from 2015 Pro Day Results

=== Atlanta Falcons ===
On May 6, 2015, Ume-Ezeoke signed as an undrafted free agent with the Atlanta Falcons. Ume-Ezeoke was cut during the first round of Falcons' cuts on August 30, 2015.

=== Arizona Cardinals ===
On January 5, 2016, Ume-Ezeoke was signed by the Arizona Cardinals to a future/reserve contract. On May 4, 2016, he was cut by the Cardinals.

=== Pittsburgh Steelers ===
On August 1, 2016, Ume-Ezeoke signed with the Pittsburgh Steelers. On August 20, 2016, the Steelers waived/injured Ume-Ezeoke and was placed on injured reserve.
