= Luling High School =

Location
- 218 East Travis Street; Luling, Texas 78648-2922; United States; 29.6778°N 97.6543°W

Information
- School type: Public high school
- School district: Luling Independent School District
- Principal: Joseph Alvarez
- Staff: 32.41 (FTE)
- Grades: 9-12
- Enrollment: 392 (2025-2026)
- Student to teacher ratio: 12.74
- Colors: Green & White
- Athletics conference: UIL Class 3A
- Mascot: Eagle/Lady Eagle
- Website: Luling High School

Luling High School is a public high school located in Luling, Texas (USA).The school was opened up in 1924 and is classified as a 3A school by the UIL. It is part of the Luling Independent School District located in the southwest corner of Caldwell County. For the 2024-2025 school year, the school was given a "C" by the Texas Education Agency.

== Athletics ==
The Luling High School is classified as a 3A school by UIL. The Luling Eagles compete in cross country, volleyball, football, basketball, powerlifting, golf, tennis, track, soccer, softball, and baseball.

=== State titles ===
- Boys cross country
  - 1999(3A), 2010(2A), 2011(2A), 2012(2A), 2013(2A), 2014(3A), 2015(3A), 2016(3A), 2017(3A)
- Girls track
  - 2000(3A)
- Boys Track
  - 1978(2A)

=== State finalist & State Semi- Finalists ===
- Football
  - 1953(1A), 1955(1A)
- Volleyball
  - 2005(3A)
- Baseball
  - 1995(3A)
- Boys Track
  - 1992(3A), 2000(3A)
- Girls Track
  - 1999(3A), 2001(3A), 2002(3A)
- Boys Basketball
  - 1971(2A), 1982(3A)
- Boys cross country
  - 1993(3A), 1994(3A), 1996(3A), 1997(3A), 1998(3A), 2000(3A), 2003(3A), 2005(3A), 2006(3A), 2007(3A), 2009(3A), 2018(3A), 2019(3A)
- Girls cross country
  - 2006(3A), 2009(3A), 2011(3A), 2012(3A)

Luling Rosenwald (PVIL)

- Boys track
  - 1944(C)

== Academics ==
=== State finalist ===
- Marching band
  - 1982(2A), 1983(2A), 2011(2A), 2013(2A), 2015(3A), 2017(3A)
- Literacy Criticism
  - 2023(3A)

== Notable alumni ==
- Matt Bumgardner, former football player, class of 1995.
- Biz Mackey, former baseball player, attended Luling Public School.
- Willis Mackey, former football player, class of 1978.
- Craig Mager, former NFL player, class of 2010.
- James Matthews, former baseball player, class of 1973.
- John Mundine, former baseball player, class of 1995.
- Ychilindria Spears, Track and Field athlete, class of 2002.
- Frank Watson, former baseball player, class of 1985.
