= Sam Eguavoen =

American football player (born 1993)

Profile
- Position: Linebacker

Personal information
- Born: February 22, 1993 (age 33); Garland, Texas, U.S.
- Listed height: 6 ft 1 in (1.85 m)
- Listed weight: 236 lb (107 kg)

Career information
- High school: Garland (TX) Lakeview Centennial
- College: Texas Tech (2011–2014)
- NFL draft: 2015: undrafted

Career history
- Saskatchewan Roughriders (2016–2018); Miami Dolphins (2019–2022); New York Jets (2023–2024)

Career NFL statistics
- Total tackles: 89
- Sacks: 4
- Fumble recoveries: 3
- Pass deflections: 2
- Stats at Pro Football Reference

Career CFL statistics
- Total tackles: 173
- Sacks: 4
- Interceptions: 0
- Stats at CFL.ca

Samuel Ehi Eguavoen (born February 22, 1993) is an American professional football linebacker. He played college football for the Texas Tech Red Raiders.

== Early life ==
Eguavoen played high school football at Lakeview Centennial High School in Garland, Texas, recording 118 total tackles, four sacks, one interception, two pass deflections, two forced fumbles and two fumble recoveries his senior year. He earned Second-team District 10-5A honors. He was rated a three-star prospect by Rivals.com and ESPN.com. Eguavoen also played basketball at Lakeview Centennial. He is of Nigerian descent.

== College career ==
Eguavoen played for the Texas Tech Red Raiders of Texas Tech University from 2011 to 2014. He played in twelve games, starting five, while totaling 30 tackles his freshman season in 2011 and was named to Rivals.com's Big 12 All-Freshman Team Defense. He appeared in thirteen games, starting nine, and accumulated 52 tackles in 2012. Eguavoen played in thirteen games, all starts, while recording 70 tackles, 1.5 sacks, three quarterback hurries, two pass breakups, one forced fumble and one fumble recovery his junior year in 2013. He appeared in ten games, all starts, while totaling 74 tackles, two sacks, two pass breakups, two forced fumbles, two fumble recoveries, one interception and one quarterback hurry his senior season in 2014. He also garnered Honorable Mention All-Big 12 recognition in 2014.

== Professional career ==
Pre-draft measurables
Height	Weight	Arm length	Hand span	40-yard dash	10-yard split	20-yard split	20-yard shuttle	Three-cone drill	Vertical jump	Broad jump	Bench press
6 ft 0 3/8 in (1.84 m)	227 lb (103 kg)	32 3/4 in (0.83 m)	9 1/8 in (0.23 m)	4.75 s	1.60 s	2.66 s	4.34 s	7.15 s	38.5 in (0.98 m)	10 ft 5 in (3.18 m)	16 reps
All values from Texas Tech Pro Day

Eguavoen went undrafted in the 2015 NFL draft and spent the year working in Dallas, Texas.

=== Saskatchewan Roughriders ===
He signed with the Saskatchewan Roughriders of the CFL on February 24, 2016. He made his CFL debut on June 30, 2016, recording four defensive tackles against the Toronto Argonauts. Eguavoen played three seasons for the Roughriders, playing in 38 games for the team and contributing with 159 defensive tackles, 14 special teams tackles, four sacks, two forced fumbles and one interception. Eguavoen, who was scheduled to be a free agent February 12, 2019, was released by the Riders on January 2, 2019, to pursue NFL opportunities.

=== Miami Dolphins ===
On January 7, 2019, Eguavoen signed with the Miami Dolphins of the NFL. During his time with Miami, Equavoen appeared in 66 games and started seven. He also played a large role on special teams throughout his years on the team.

He was placed on the reserve/COVID-19 list by the team on August 19, 2020, and was activated the next day. He started six games during the season, recording 42 tackles, 3.5 sacks, and one fumble recovery.

In 2021 during a week 18 win against the New England Patriots, Eguavoen recovered a fumble in the end zone on the final play of the game to score his first NFL touchdown.

On March 16, 2022, Eguavoen signed a one-year contract extension with the Dolphins.

=== New York Jets ===
On August 6, 2023, Eguavoen signed with the New York Jets on a one-year contract worth $1,080,000. He was released on August 29, and re-signed to the practice squad. He was then elevated to the active roster on September 11, 2023, and appeared in the Jets season opening win against the Buffalo Bills as a special teams player. During the following week against the Dallas Cowboys, Eguavoen made his first appearance on defense as a Jet, alongside more usage on special teams. He was signed to the active roster on September 23.

On May 3, 2024, Eguavoen re-signed with the Jets. He was released on August 27, and re-signed to the practice squad. Eguavoen was promoted to the active roster on September 9.
