= Chandler Worthy =

American gridiron football player (born 1993)

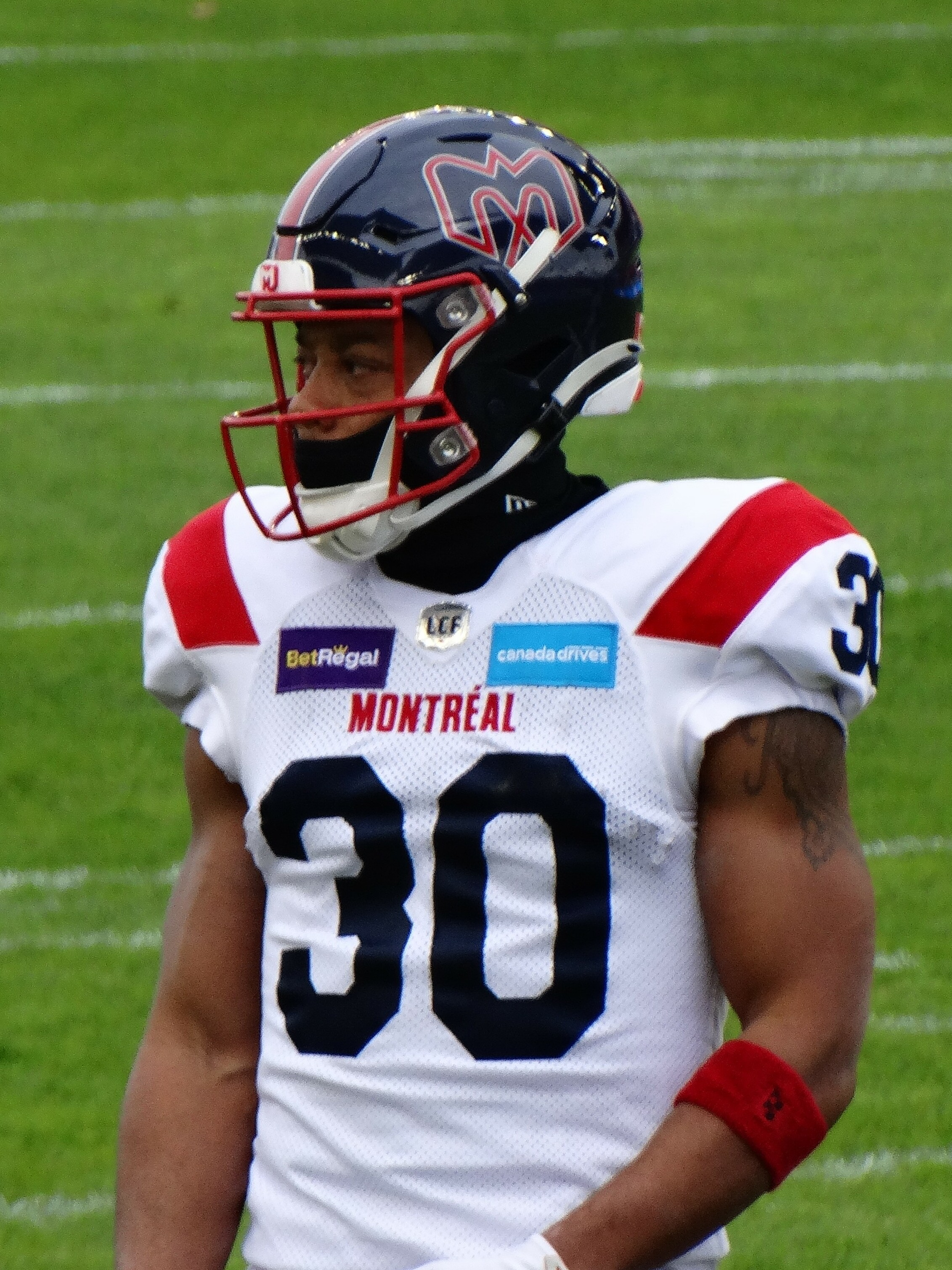
- Worthy with the Montreal Alouettes in 2022

Profile
- Position: Wide receiver

Personal information
- Born: September 15, 1993 (age 33); Griffin, Georgia, U.S.
- Listed height: 5 ft 9 in (1.75 m)
- Listed weight: 173 lb (78 kg)

Career information
- College: Troy
- NFL draft: 2015: undrafted

Career history
- Houston Texans (2015); New York Jets (2016)*; Toronto Argonauts (2017–2021); Montreal Alouettes (2022–2023); Calgary Stampeders (2024)*
- * Offseason or practice squad member only

Awards and highlights
- Grey Cup champion (2023); CFL East All-Star (2022); First-team All-Sun Belt (2014)

Career NFL statistics
- Receptions: 3
- Receiving yards: 14
- Stats at Pro Football Reference

Career CFL statistics
- Receptions: 33
- Targets: 51
- Receiving yards: 375
- Receiving touchdowns: 4
- Return yards: 3,145
- Stats at CFL.ca

Chandler Regis Worthy (born September 15, 1993) is an American professional football wide receiver who is a free agent. He was most recently a member of the Calgary Stampeders of the Canadian Football League (CFL). He was signed by the Houston Texans as an undrafted free agent in 2015. He played college football at Troy. Worthy has also been a member of the New York Jets, Toronto Argonauts, and Montreal Alouettes.

== Professional career ==
=== Houston Texans ===
After going undrafted in the 2015 NFL draft Worthy signed with the Houston Texans. Worthy played in three games for the Texans in 2015, catching three passes for 14 yards. He also returned three punts for a total of nine yards, and had one kickoff return for 27 yards.

=== New York Jets ===
Worthy signed a reserve/future contract with the New York Jets on January 12, 2016. On September 3, 2016, he was released by the Jets as part of final roster cuts.

=== Toronto Argonauts ===
On February 2, 2017, Worthy and the Toronto Argonauts agreed to a contract. He dressed in his first CFL game on June 25, 2017, against the Hamilton Tiger-Cats where he returned five punts for 20 yards and had five kickoff returns for 60 yards. After playing in three games, he was moved to the injured list, where he remained until the September 16, 2017, when he recorded his first career CFL reception, for five yards, against the Edmonton Eskimos. However, he was moved to the practice roster on September 20, 2017, and then outright released on October 20, 2017.

Worthy re-signed with the Argonauts on January 24, 2018, but was released during training camp on June 3, 2018. He re-signed with the Argonauts on October 10, 2018, but spent the rest of the year on the practice roster and was re-signed after the conclusion of the season.

In 2019, he began the season on the injured list and practice roster before playing in the July 25, 2019, game against Edmonton. He went back to the practice roster and then played again on October 18, 2019, where he had a career-high nine catches for 93 yards and one touchdown, which was the first of his CFL career, in a game against the Montreal Alouettes. For the season, he played in three games where he had a total of 12 receptions for 129 yards and two touchdowns.

Worthy re-signed with the Argonauts on December 2, 2019, but did not play in 2020 due to the cancellation of the 2020 CFL season. He began the 2021 season on the practice roster and was released on August 10, 2021. He re-signed with the Argonauts on September 1, 2021, to a practice roster agreement. He played in nine regular season games where he had 16 receptions for 203 yards and two touchdowns. He spent part of 2022 training camp with the team, but was released after the first pre-season game on May 29, 2022.

=== Montreal Alouettes ===
Two days after being released by the Argos, Worthy signed with the Montreal Alouettes. He played in 15 regular season games where he had 47 punt returns for 547 yards, 51 kickoff returns for 1,220 yards and two touchdowns, and three missed field goal returns for 57 yards. At the end of the 2022 season, he was named the East Division's nominee for the CFL's Most Outstanding Special Teams Player and was named an East Division All-Star.

In 2023, Worthy played in the team's first 14 games of the season where he had 48 kickoff returns for 1,136 yards, 56 punt returns for 544 yards and one touchdown, and four missed field goal returns for 96 yards. However, he suffered an ankle injury and sat out for the rest of the regular season. After he became healthy enough to play in the post-season, he remained a healthy scratch after James Letcher Jr. had performed well in his absence. Worthy remained a healthy scratch as the team won the 110th Grey Cup. He was released just prior to 2024 training camp on May 1, 2024.

=== Calgary Stampeders ===
On August 24, 2024, Worthy was signed by the Calgary Stampeders. He remained on the practice roster for the rest of the season and his contract expired on October 27, 2024.
