= Jennie Everton Clarke =

- Born: July 20, 1862; Luce Township, IN
- Died: January 15, 1929 (aged 66); Luling, Texas
- Education: Xenia College
- Occupation: Orphanage founder/administrator

Jennie Everton Clarke (July 20, 1862 – January 15, 1929) was an American woman who founded the Belle Haven Orphan home in Luling, Texas, in 1899. In addition to running the orphanage, she was also active in the temperance movement.

== Biography ==
Clarke was born in Luce Township, Indiana. Her father, Dr. William T. Everton, was a physician and her mother was Martha Everton. Sources differ on whether she was of English or Irish heritage.

Clarke was educated at Xenia College. After Clarke's first husband Lee Eckols died in 1894, she married Rev. Alan G. Clarke in 1896; they divorced in 1898. Of her spouse, she stated, "My husband wore himself out trying to dominate me, and I am still on top of the sod." Clarke had a daughter named Nora with Eckols, in addition to two stepchildren.

Clarke was reportedly a devout member of the Church of Christ. According to the U.S. Census for 1900, she was operating an orphanage with five children in 1900. This was the first orphanage run by a member of the Church of Christ in Texas or other Western states.

A 1918 article written by C.L. Edson in American Magazine gave a very flattering account of Clarke's efforts to provide a strict, but loving home for the boys in Belle Haven. In the article, Edson noted that it was unusual for a woman at that period in history to run a dormitory that had boys. Also, Clarke only accepted children who didn't have any living parents, or "true orphans." Some of the boys in her orphanage were described as the "toughest cases" and Clarke insisted on them obeying her rules. However, she claims to have never dismissed a boy from Belle Haven for violating her rules. She stated, "If I can't win a boy's confidence and show him the right road in life to travel, I'm a failure with that boy." Clarke's goal was for the children under her care to become self-sufficient. She expected the boys to care for their living quarters and assigned them tasks such as washing the dishes.

Belle Haven was located on 50 acres (20 ha) of land. Domestic sciences, music, art, and farming were taught to both girls and boys. The boys were responsible for the farm work. In addition, there was a store on the property that opened July 20, 1922 to help raise funds.

In November 1921, Belle Haven was incorporated with the goal of it continuing for another 50 years. Belle Haven was purchased for US$15,000 and Jennie Clarke, along with the Rev. George M. Rance, J.P Hook, C.F. Dye, and Nora Levy were appointed as life directors.

Clarke's health began failing in the 1920s; she died in 1929. Belle Haven closed in 1930.

It is speculated that Clarke's efforts inspired the Tipton home in Tipton, Oklahoma and the Boles Home in Quinlan, Texas, both operated by Church of Christ members. Following Clarke's death, the Luling Signal praised her efforts for working with children.
