= Xenia College =

Coordinates: 39.68784°N 83.92437°W

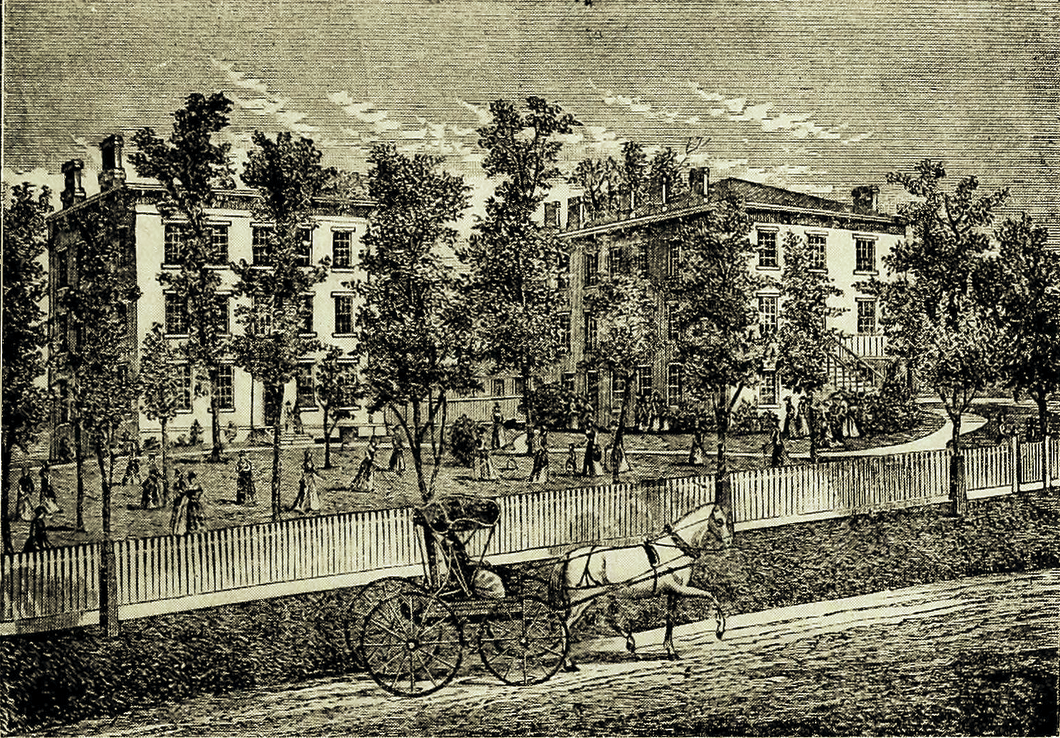
- Xenia Female College

Location
- Xenia, Ohio; United States

Information
- Former name: Xenia Female Academy; Xenia Female Seminary and Collegiate Institute; Xenia Female College
- Type: tuition-based boarding school
- Religious affiliation: Methodist Episcopal Church
- Established: 1850
- Closed: late 1880s
- Gender: Girls' school; Co-educational; (varied)

Xenia College (earlier names: Xenia Female Academy, Xenia Female Seminary and Collegiate Institute, Xenia Female College) was an American educational institution located in Xenia, Ohio. Established as a private school, its management shifted after a couple of years to the Methodist Episcopal Church. Changing its name frequently during the first few years of its existence made it difficult to follow its career. Starting as the Xenia Female Academy in 1850, it became the Xenia Female Seminary and Collegiate Institute in 1854, the Xenia Female College in 1856, and Xenia College in 1863, continuing under the latter designation until it closed its doors in the latter part of the 1880s.

The Xenia Female Academy was incorporated on March 22, 1850, Thomas C. Wright and eleven others being the incorporators. There were nine trustees. This was a stock company, with shares at US$50 each, real property not to exceed US$20,000, and capital stock valued at US$25 each. The curriculum and purpose of the institution was set forth as "arts and sciences and all necessary and useful branches of a thorough and useful education such as may be taught in the best female colleges and academies".

At an elevation of 961 feet (293 m) MSL, this institution occupied a commanding eminence in the city of Xenia, and was accessible by railroads from all parts of Ohio. The grounds were ample for exercise, and were sufficiently shaded with forest trees and shrubbery. The buildings were commodious and well furnished, and from their situation, pupils had the fresh air, quietness and scenery of the country, with the privileges of the city.

== Xenia Female Academy ==
The inception of the first institution, the Xenia Female Academy, was an act of the General Assembly of the state, dated March 21, 1850, which granted a charter to an institution known by that name. The incorporators were Thomas Coke Wright, David Barr, Joseph A. Coburn, Abraham Hivling, Dr. Joshua Martin, Roswell F. Howard, Daniel Martin, Hugh McMillen, Thomas S. Towler, Joseph G. Gest, William B. Fairchild and James J. Winans. These men, all residents of Xenia or the immediate vicinity, represented the leaders in several professions. They were ministers, lawyers, newspaper editors, physicians, merchants, and business men. The incorporators held their first business meeting on June 1, 1850, and organized by electing Daniel Martin president and Joseph A. Coburn secretary. It was decided to solicit subscriptions to the capital stock, which, by the charter, was to be limited to US$25,000, divided into five hundred shares of US$50 each. Daniel Martin was authorized to canvass the city and county for stock subscriptions and he met with such success that on June 29 the incorporators, all being stockholders, met for permanent organization. The stockholders elected nine trustees: Abraham Hivling, John B. Allen, James J. Winans, Joseph G. Gest, William Cooper, Daniel Martin, David Barr, Joshua Martin and Hugh McMillen. Two days later, July 1, these nine trustees met and effected a permanent organization by electing the following officers: President, Dr. Joshua Martin; treasurer, Daniel Martin; James J. Winans, secretary.

The history of the academy shows that its promoters were anxious to get it going as soon as possible. On July 4, the trustees held a meeting at which they decided to advertise the opening of the academy in the fall of the same year, that is, in the fall of 1850. At this same meeting, the trustees elected Dr. Thomas S. Towler superintendent of the academy, while on October 19, Nancy M. Hartford and Mary E. McQuirk were elected as additional teachers.

The trustees had secured an option on the old county seminary building on East Church street, and it was proposed to conduct the new school in this building until it could be seen whether a new building should be erected. In this building, accordingly, the first term of the Xenia Female Academy opened during the latter part of October, 1850. A part of the building was set aside for housing such pupils as might come in from outside the city, the dormitory being placed under the charge of Mrs. Huntington.

The school year of 1850–51 was such a success that the trustees felt justified in proceeding with the collection of funds for the erection of a new building for the academy. On May 21, 1851, they appointed a committee to select a suitable site for the proposed new building. This committee made its final report on July 30, 1851, and recommended that the building be erected on East Church street. The trustees had previously given notice that the first installment of the stock subscriptions would be called for on August 1, 1851. On July 22, the trustees had re-elected Dr. Thomas S. Towler superintendent for another year, and on the 30th of the month, the day the committee reported their selection of the new site, the board of trustees appointed Hugh McMillen, David Barr and Superintendent Towler as a committee to take charge of the erection of the building. Meanwhile, school was to continue in the old building. The board elected Mrs. Lewis Wright and Mary Eliza Harbison as assistants to Superintendent Towler, these two teachers continuing with the academy during the two succeeding years.

The new building was completed in the summer of 1852. At the close of the school year in 1852, the trustees of the new institution were in considerable doubt as to its future possibilities. The new constitution of the state had provided for a new system of common schools, a system whereby the old subscription school was to be abolished and free public schools opened. Up to this time, all the better schools had been tuition-based, but when it was proposed to establish throughout the state a complete system of free schools, open to every one, it soon became apparent that the many private tuition-based schools would have to close. Therefore, in the summer of 1852, the trustees of the Xenia Female Academy had a serious problem before them. What would they do with their new institution? They could hardly expect to get the patronage they expected, especially when they had calculated on doing much of the same work which was to be done by the free public schools, considering the fact that they had to depend on tuition for the support of their school. It was at this juncture that the history of the school takes a sudden turn.

In the 1850s, church lines were much more sharply drawn than at later times. They were far from being as tolerant of faiths other than their own. The Presbyterians had a female school of their own in Xenia, but the Methodists were not altogether certain that it would be the right thing to allow their daughters to attend such an institution. Hence, in the summer of 1852, when the management of the Xenia Female Academy were discussing the future of their institution, the Methodists began to consider taking over the school and turning it into an institution for their daughters. The result of the negotiations between the Methodists and the trustees was an offer on September 27, 1852, to place the school under the management of the Cincinnati Annual Conference of the Methodist Episcopal Church.

The church agreed to assume the control of the school under certain conditions: First, that US$6,000 should be raised in Xenia and immediate vicinity for the purpose of building a boarding-house and making other stipulated improvements, and secondly, that the trustees of the academy should transfer to the church a sufficient amount of stock in order to give it a controlling interest in the school. The church, on its part, appointed Rev. Charles Elliott, Rev. A. Lowry and Rev. W. I. Ellsworth to represent it during the time the academy trustees were trying to fulfill these conditions.

The full amount was raised by February 15, 1853, or at least it was guaranteed by Dr. Joshua Martin, Michael Nunnemaker, Alfred Trader, Nathan Nesbitt, I. S. Drake and Casper L. Merrick. At the same time, sufficient stock was turned over to the church to give it control of the school. With these conditions met, the church assumed the management of the academy, a control which was maintained through all the successive changes in name and policy of the institution until it was closed.

== Xenia Female Seminary and Collegiate Institute ==
On February 26, 1853, the church appointed Abraham Hivling, Alfred Trader and Dr. Joshua Martin as a building committee and instructed them to confer with the conference in regard to the erection of the proposed boarding house. Doctor Lowry was appointed principal of the school on May 16, 1853, at the same time being authorized to act as fiscal agent for the school. The boarding house was erected in the summer of 1853 and was ready for the reception of students in the fall of that year. With the new management in charge the school took on a new lease of life and managed to weather all the adverse conditions. It was still called the Xenia Female Academy, but on June 30, 1854, Dr. Joshua Martin and C. L. Merrick were ordered to take such legal steps as might be necessary to change the name to the Xenia Female Seminary and Collegiate Institute. Rev. Mansfield French had been elected superintendent on May 18, 1854, and he wanted to make the school co-educational. This change in policy made it necessary to change the name of the school, hence the bisexual appellation which was given it -Xenia Female Seminary and Collegiate Institute- the first half being feminine and the last half masculine. During the incumbency of French, 1854–56, the school became recognized as an able institution. On May 7, 1856, Rev. O. M. Spencer became the head of the school, being succeeded on August 4, 1858, by William Smith, A. M., who was to remain in charge for a quarter of a century.

The students were required to attend public worship on the Sabbath at such church as their parents designated. There were two meetings in the college, during each week, for prayer and religious conversation.

Boys and young men could attend as day scholars.

== Xenia Female College ==
The next change in name was made on May 6, 1861, when the school became known as the Xenia Female College. Two years later, however, it was again made co-educational and so continued until it closed its career.

== Xenia College ==
When it was decided to open it to both sexes in 1863, the school was given its fourth and last name -Xenia College-, the name by which it was thereafter known. The president, William Smith, remained with the school until his retirement in 1884. Smith was a man of unusual ability as an instructor.

In 1868, the Cincinnati Annual Conference of the Methodist Episcopal Church reported that the institution, open to both men and women, had a prosperous year. The buildings were ample and well arranged for school purposes; the grounds were large and well shaded with beautiful forest trees; and the location was one of the most accessible in Ohio. The boarding house was home-like in its appointments, and offered facilities for outdoor exercise and recreation.

Experienced teachers were employed in all the departments. A thorough musical education was available, that department being in charge of the Miami Academy of Music, located at Xenia. Special attention was given in this institution to teacher training. The Normal Department was under the immediate supervision of Professor Smith. A special Normal Class was taught in the college buildings during a summer session, and a large number of teachers availed themselves of this opportunity.

Upon Smith's retirement the school passed into the charge of Professor DeMotte, who conducted the school for three or four years and then it was closed forever, conditions in educational affairs having reached a point in Xenia where it was no longer profitable to conduct a private school.

The two buildings later were purchased by Eli Millen and the college building proper, which has since been remodeled into a dwelling house, is still owned by his estate. The old boarding-house was torn down after the turn of the century, and the bricks were used in constructing part of the Bijou Theatre.

== Notable alumni ==
- Mary Virginia Proctor (1854-1927), journalist, philanthropist, social activist
