= Luling, Texas =

- City
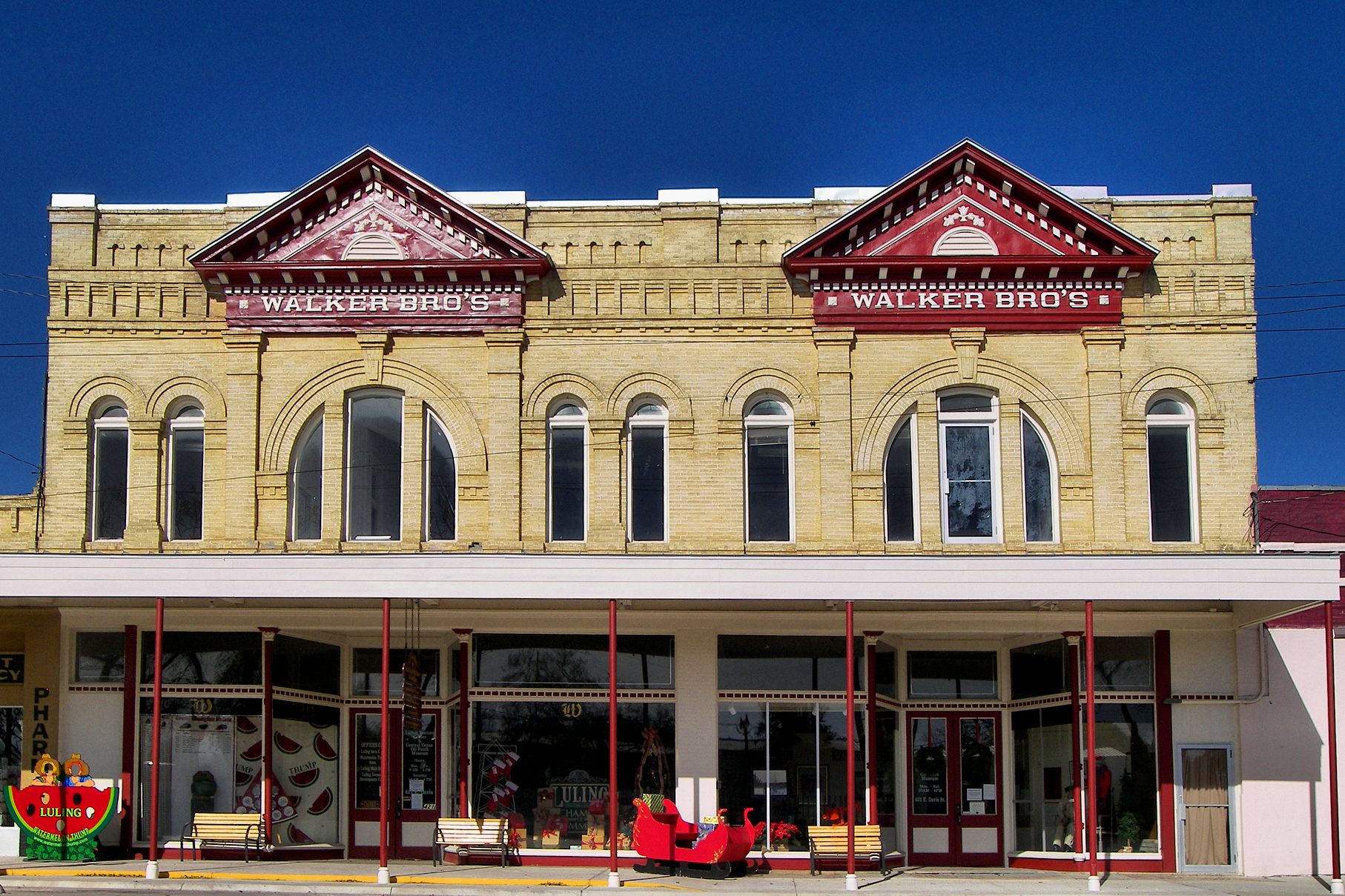
- Oil Patch Museum
- Interactive map of Luling, Texas
- Location within Texas
- Coordinates: 29°40′32″N 97°37′44″W
- Country: United States
- State: Texas
- Counties: Caldwell, Guadalupe
- Incorporated: 1874

Government
  - Type: Council-Manager

Area
  - Total: 5.55 sq mi (14.38 km^{2})
  - Land: 5.51 sq mi (14.27 km^{2})
  - Water: 0.042 sq mi (0.11 km^{2})
- Elevation: 410 ft (120 m)

Population (2020)
  - Total: 5,599
  - Density: 1,065.1/sq mi (411.22/km^{2})
- Time zone: UTC-6 (Central (CST))
  - Summer (DST): UTC-5 (CDT)
- ZIP code: 78648
- Area code: 830
- FIPS code: 48-45096
- GNIS feature ID: 2410896
- Website: www.cityofluling.net

Luling /ˈluːlɪŋ/ is a city in Caldwell and Guadalupe counties, Texas, United States, along the San Marcos River. The population as of the 2026 census was 5,831.

== History ==
In the 1870s, the Galveston, Harrisburg & San Antonio Railway (GH&SA) built a railroad west from Alleyton on the Colorado River near Columbus towards San Antonio. In 1874, construction paused for about two years at a point 71 miles beyond the Colorado River. A small town developed at the railhead.

That town was named after a New York banker, Charles Luling. He was a personal friend of Thomas Wentworth Pierce and provided the financing for the GH&SA railroad as well the purchase of the land that became Luling. Prior to the founding of the town, a small farming community named Atlanta was established nearby, with residents associating themselves with the newly founded Luling, causing Atlanta to fade.

Luling was founded in 1874 as a railroad town and became a rowdy center for the cattle drivers on the Chisholm Trail. Contempt of the law by the cowboys helped Luling become known as the "toughest town in Texas". After the great cattle drives ended in the late 1880s, Luling quieted down to a town of about 500 and cotton ruled the local economy. Perhaps due to arrival of immigrants, including a sizeable Jewish population, in the late-19th century, Luling began a long, slow, period of growth, and by 1925 the population reached 1,500.

One of the most significant events in Luling's history was the discovery of oil by Edgar B. Davis. Davis mortgaged everything he owned to finance drilling operations around Luling. On August 9, 1922, the Rafael Rios No. 1 well struck oil at 2,161 feet (659 m), producing 150 barrels per day (24 m^{3}/d). To repay his loans, Davis contracted 2 million barrels (320,000 m^{3}) each to Atlantic Oil and Magnolia Oil at $.50 a barrel, plus another 2 million barrels (320,000 m^{3}) to Magnolia at $.75 per barrel.

Davis' discovery opened up an oilfield 12 miles (19 km) long and 2 miles (3 km) wide. The economy quickly moved from the railroad and agriculture to oil. The population of the town rapidly increased to over 5,000. By 1924, the Luling Oil Field was producing over 15 million barrels (2,400,000 m^{3}) of oil per year, and oil formed much of Luling's economy for the next 60 years.

As oil grew in importance in the 1930s and 1940s, the railroads that helped form the town declined and largely pulled out of Luling.

== Geography ==
Luling is located in southern Caldwell County, 47 miles (76 km) south of Austin. The city limits extend south along Texas State Highway 80 across the San Marcos River into Guadalupe County, reaching as far as Interstate 10 Exit 628. Via I-10, San Antonio is 57 miles (92 km) to the west and Houston is 141 miles (227 km) to the east.

According to the United States Census Bureau, Luling has a total area of 5.50 square miles (14.2 km^{2}), of which 5.46 square miles (14.1 km^{2}) is land, and 0.04 square miles (0.10 km^{2}), or 0.67%, is water.

=== Climate ===
The climate in this area is characterized by hot, humid summers and generally mild to cool winters. According to the Köppen Climate Classification system, Luling has a humid subtropical climate, abbreviated "Cfa" on climate maps.

Climate data for Luling, Texas (1991–2020 normals, extremes 1897–present)
Month	Jan	Feb	Mar	Apr	May	Jun	Jul	Aug	Sep	Oct	Nov	Dec	Year
Record high °F (°C)	89 (32)	99 (37)	100 (38)	100 (38)	105 (41)	108 (42)	110 (43)	111 (44)	110 (43)	101 (38)	92 (33)	89 (32)	111 (44)
Mean maximum °F (°C)	79.7 (26.5)	83.2 (28.4)	87.1 (30.6)	90.7 (32.6)	94.4 (34.7)	98.4 (36.9)	101.0 (38.3)	103.1 (39.5)	99.2 (37.3)	93.3 (34.1)	86.4 (30.2)	80.5 (26.9)	104.3 (40.2)
Mean daily maximum °F (°C)	63.9 (17.7)	67.5 (19.7)	74.2 (23.4)	81.0 (27.2)	87.5 (30.8)	93.6 (34.2)	96.8 (36.0)	98.2 (36.8)	91.8 (33.2)	83.8 (28.8)	73.1 (22.8)	65.3 (18.5)	81.4 (27.4)
Daily mean °F (°C)	51.7 (10.9)	55.4 (13.0)	62.2 (16.8)	68.8 (20.4)	76.6 (24.8)	82.8 (28.2)	85.3 (29.6)	85.7 (29.8)	79.9 (26.6)	70.9 (21.6)	60.6 (15.9)	53.1 (11.7)	69.4 (20.8)
Mean daily minimum °F (°C)	39.6 (4.2)	43.2 (6.2)	50.3 (10.2)	56.5 (13.6)	65.6 (18.7)	72.1 (22.3)	73.8 (23.2)	73.3 (22.9)	68.1 (20.1)	58.0 (14.4)	48.2 (9.0)	40.9 (4.9)	57.5 (14.2)
Mean minimum °F (°C)	23.5 (−4.7)	27.1 (−2.7)	31.0 (−0.6)	38.6 (3.7)	49.0 (9.4)	62.9 (17.2)	67.8 (19.9)	66.2 (19.0)	53.6 (12.0)	39.0 (3.9)	29.4 (−1.4)	24.7 (−4.1)	20.9 (−6.2)
Record low °F (°C)	−3 (−19)	4 (−16)	17 (−8)	26 (−3)	39 (4)	50 (10)	57 (14)	56 (13)	41 (5)	26 (−3)	19 (−7)	4 (−16)	−3 (−19)
Average precipitation inches (mm)	2.40 (61)	2.16 (55)	2.74 (70)	2.94 (75)	4.20 (107)	3.55 (90)	1.85 (47)	2.60 (66)	3.42 (87)	4.20 (107)	2.57 (65)	2.76 (70)	35.39 (899)
Average snowfall inches (cm)	0.0 (0.0)	0.0 (0.0)	0.0 (0.0)	0.0 (0.0)	0.0 (0.0)	0.0 (0.0)	0.0 (0.0)	0.0 (0.0)	0.0 (0.0)	0.0 (0.0)	0.0 (0.0)	0.0 (0.0)	0.0 (0.0)
Average precipitation days (≥ 0.01 in)	7.1	6.8	7.1	6.1	6.5	6.5	4.4	4.5	7.0	5.9	6.3	7.1	75.3
Average snowy days (≥ 0.1 in)	0.0	0.0	0.0	0.0	0.0	0.0	0.0	0.0	0.0	0.0	0.0	0.0	0.0
Source: NOAA

== Demographics ==
Historical population
Census	Pop.	Note	%±
1880	1,114		—
1890	1,792		60.9%
1900	1,349		−24.7%
1910	1,404		4.1%
1920	1,502		7.0%
1930	5,970		297.5%
1940	4,437		−25.7%
1950	4,297		−3.2%
1960	4,412		2.7%
1970	4,719		7.0%
1980	5,039		6.8%
1990	4,661		−7.5%
2000	5,080		9.0%
2010	5,411		6.5%
2020	5,599		3.5%
U.S. Decennial Census; 2010-2020

=== 2020 census ===
As of the 2020 census, there were 5,599 people, 2,074 households, and 1,570 families residing in Luling. The median age was 37.6 years; 26.5% of residents were under the age of 18 and 17.9% of residents were 65 years of age or older. For every 100 females there were 92.3 males, and for every 100 females age 18 and over there were 89.2 males age 18 and over.

Of those households, 34.6% had children under the age of 18 living in them, 40.7% were married-couple households, 19.2% were households with a male householder and no spouse or partner present, and 34.0% were households with a female householder and no spouse or partner present. About 29.0% of all households were made up of individuals and 13.1% had someone living alone who was 65 years of age or older.

There were 2,278 housing units, of which 9.0% were vacant. The homeowner vacancy rate was 1.6% and the rental vacancy rate was 4.9%.

95.5% of residents lived in urban areas, while 4.5% lived in rural areas.

Racial composition as of the 2020 census (NH = Non-Hispanic) (Note: Note: the US Census treats Hispanic/Latino as an ethnic category. This table excludes Latinos from the racial categories and assigns them to a separate category. Hispanics/Latinos can be of any race.)
Race	Number	Percent
White	2,771	49.5%
Black or African American	426	7.6%
American Indian and Alaska Native	36	0.6%
Asian	33	0.6%
Native Hawaiian and Other Pacific Islander	4	0.1%
Some other race	943	16.8%
Two or more races	1,386	24.8%
Hispanic or Latino (of any race)	2,992	53.4%

=== 2010 census ===
As of the 2010 census, there were 5,411 people, 1,907 households, and 1,315 families residing in Luling. The population density was 991.6 inhabitants per square mile (382.9/km^{2}). There were 2,115 housing units at an average density of 391.7 per square mile (151.2/km^{2}). The racial makeup of the city was 70.8% White, 8.5% African American, 0.4% Native American, 0.5% Asian, 16.7% some other race, and 3.1% from two or more races. Hispanics or Latinos of any race were 52.6% of the population.

There were 1,907 households, out of which 37.6% had children under the age of 18 living with them, 45.4% were headed by married couples living together, 17.4% had a female householder with no husband present, and 31.0% were non-families. 26.6% of all households were made up of individuals, and 14.2% were someone living alone who was 65 years of age or older. The average household size was 2.75, and the average family size was 3.36.

In the city, 27.3% of the population were under the age of 18, 6.3% were from 20 to 24, 24.6% from 25 to 44, 22.5% from 45 to 64, and 16.7% were 65 years of age or older. The median age was 35.5 years. For every 100 females, there were 87.9 males. For every 100 females age 18 and over, there were 85.1 males.

For the period 2011–2015, the estimated median annual income for a household in the city was $39,157, and the median income for a family was $46,379. The per capita income for the city was $21,927. About 17.2% of families and 20.3% of the population were below the poverty line, including 30.3% of those under age 18 and 14.5% of those age 65 or over.

== Culture ==
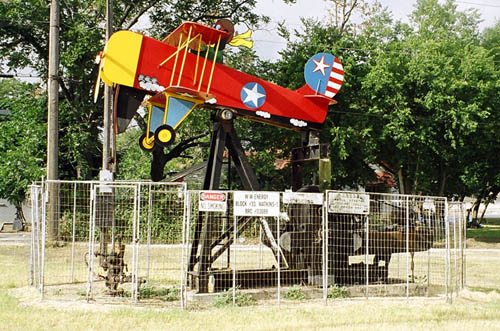
One of Luling's many decorative pumpjacks

The Luling Watermelon Thump is held each year during the last full weekend in June. It is a big celebration for the locals and draws many people from out of town as well. A favorite activity associated with the 'Thump' is the watermelon seed spitting contest.

Luling is also home to Night in Old Luling, held in October. It features games, food, booths, and a scarecrow contest.

Some of the oil jacks along the main streets of Luling are decorated with whimsical characters, such as a girl eating a watermelon.

Luling was home to the first Buc-ee's travel center. Buc-ee's replaced its current Luling location, and the new structure now claims the title of world's largest convenience store when it opened in 2024.

== Education ==
Luling Independent School District
School name	Grades taught	Students enrolled
Rosenwald Primary	Head start	190
Luling Primary	Pre-K-K–1	231
Leonard Shanklin Elementary	2–5	310
Gilbert Gerdes Junior High	6–8	302
Luling High School	9–12	432

== Notable people ==
- Emory Bellard, college football coach
- Bo Burris, NFL player
- Jennie Everton Clarke, founder of the Belle Haven Orphan home
- Michael Dorn, actor
- Tamron Hall, journalist and television talk show host
- Obert Logan, NFL football player for the Dallas Cowboys and New Orleans Saints
- Craig Mager, NFL football player for the Denver Broncos
- Marshall W. Mason, Broadway director
- Riley Odoms, NFL football player for the Denver Broncos

== Media ==
- KAMX
