= 2014 Nevada Wolf Pack football team =

American college football season

2014 Nevada Wolf Pack football

New Orleans Bowl, L 3–16 vs. Louisiana–Lafayette
- Conference: Mountain West Conference
- West Division
- Record: 7–6 (4–4 MW)
- Head coach: Brian Polian (2nd season)
- Offensive coordinator: Nick Rolovich (3rd season)
- Offensive scheme: Pistol
- Co-defensive coordinators: Scott Boone (1st season); Bill Teerlinck (2nd season)
- Base defense: 4–3
- Home stadium: Mackay Stadium

2014 Mountain West Conference football standings
	Conf.			Overall
Team	W		L	W		L
Mountain Division
No. 16 Boise State x$	7	–	1	12	–	2
Colorado State	6	–	2	10	–	3
Utah State	6	–	2	10	–	4
Air Force	5	–	3	10	–	3
New Mexico	2	–	6	4	–	8
Wyoming	2	–	6	4	–	8
West Division
Fresno State x	5	–	3	6	–	8
San Diego State	5	–	3	7	–	6
Nevada	4	–	4	7	–	6
Hawaii	3	–	5	4	–	9
San Jose State	2	–	6	3	–	9
UNLV	1	–	7	2	–	11
Championship: Boise State 28, Fresno State 14
$ – Conference champion; x – Division champion/co-champions; Rankings from AP Poll

The 2014 Nevada Wolf Pack football team represented the University of Nevada, Reno in the 2014 NCAA Division I FBS football season. The Wolf Pack were led by second–year head coach Brian Polian and played their home games at Mackay Stadium. They were members of the West Division of the Mountain West Conference. They finished the season 7–6 and 4–4 in Mountain West play to finish in third place in the West Division. They were invited to the New Orleans Bowl where they lost to Louisiana–Lafayette.

== Schedule ==
Date	Time	Opponent	Site	TV	Result	Attendance
August 30	12:00 p.m.	Southern Utah*	Mackay Stadium; Reno, NV	Campus Insiders	W 28–19	21,021
September 5	7:30 p.m.	Washington State*	Mackay Stadium; Reno, NV	ESPN	W 24–13	26,023
September 13	8:00 p.m.	at Arizona*	Arizona Stadium; Tucson, AZ	P12N	L 28–35	48,504
September 27	7:30 p.m.	at San Jose State	Spartan Stadium; San Jose, CA	CBSSN	W 21–10	14,693
October 4	7:30 p.m.	Boise State^{†}	Mackay Stadium; Reno, NV (rivalry)	CBSSN	L 46–51	32,327
October 11	7:30 p.m.	Colorado State	Mackay Stadium; Reno, NV	CBSSN	L 24–31	21,847
October 18	7:15 p.m.	at BYU*	LaVell Edwards Stadium; Provo, UT	ESPN2/BYU TV	W 42–35	56,355
October 25	9:00 p.m.	at Hawaii	Aloha Stadium; Halawa, HI	Campus Insiders/Oceanic PPV	W 26–18	27,061
November 1	7:30 p.m.	San Diego State	Mackay Stadium; Reno, NV	CBSSN	W 30–14	20,508
November 15	11:00 a.m.	at Air Force	Falcon Stadium; Colorado Springs, CO	RTRM	L 38–45 ^{OT}	11,519
November 22	7:30 p.m.	Fresno State	Mackay Stadium; Reno, NV	ESPNU	L 20–40	21,446
November 29	7:30 p.m.	at UNLV	Sam Boyd Stadium; Whitney, NV (Fremont Cannon)	ESPNU	W 49–27	20,151
December 20	8:00 a.m.	vs. Louisiana–Lafayette*	Mercedes-Benz Superdome; New Orleans, LA (New Orleans Bowl)	ESPN	L 3–16	34,014
*Non-conference game; ^{†}Homecoming; All times are in Pacific time

== Preseason ==
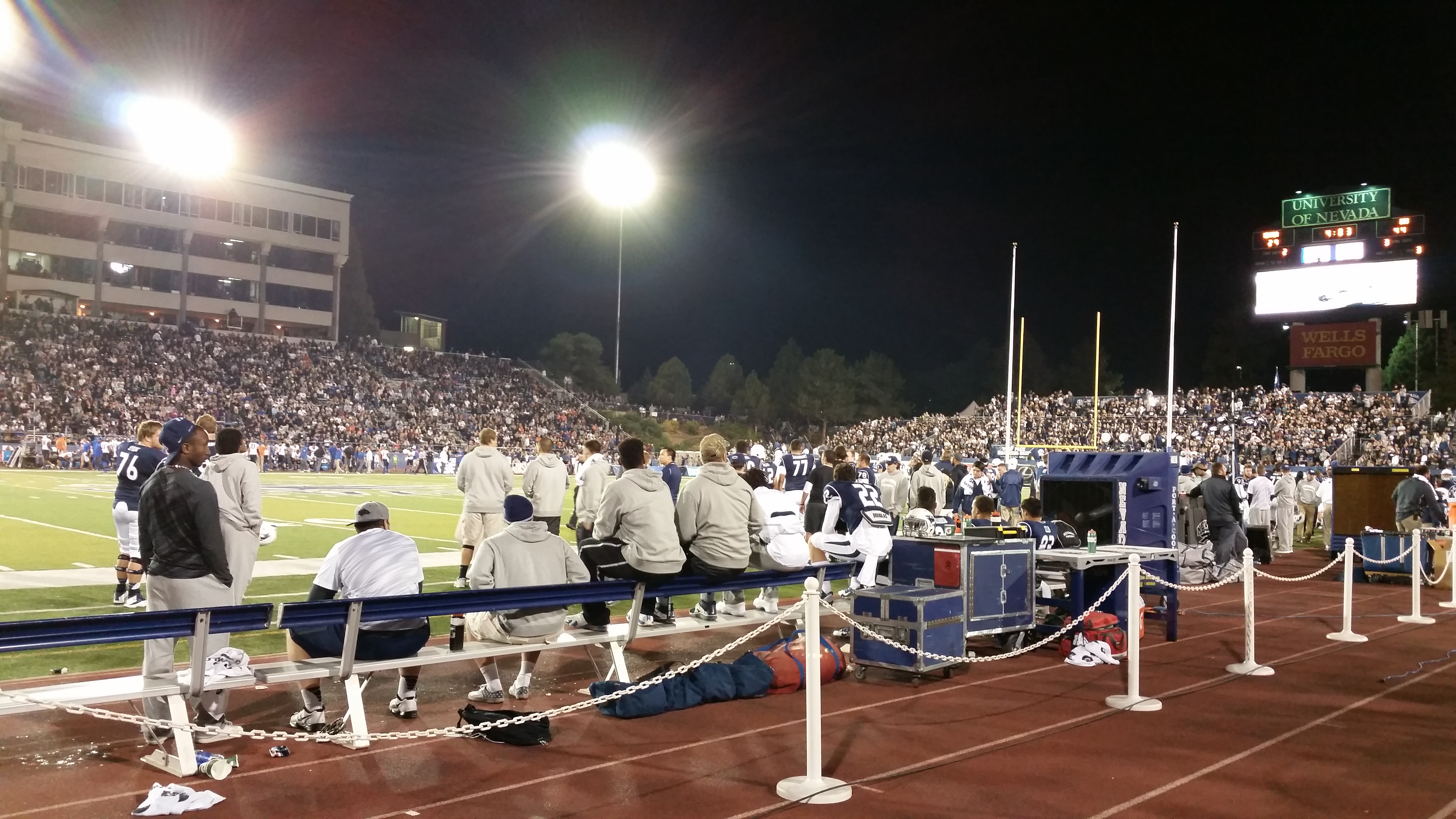
Nevada on the Chris Ault Field vs. Boise State on October 4, 2014 at Mackay Stadium in Reno, Nevada

=== Mountain West media days ===
The Mountain West media days were held on July 22–23, 2014, at the Cosmopolitan in Paradise, Nevada.

=== Media poll ===
The preseason poll was released on July 21, 2014. The Wolf Pack were predicted to finish in third place in the MW West Division.

=== Preseason All–Mountain West Team ===
The Wolf Pack had one player selected to the preseason All–Mountain West Team; one from the defense.

Defense

Brock Hekking – DL

== Game summaries ==
=== Southern Utah ===
Southern Utah at Nevada

Team	1	2	3	4	Total
Thunderbirds	0	0	6	13	19
• Wolf Pack	0	7	14	7	28

- Date: August 30, 2014
- Location: Mackay Stadium
  Reno, NV
- Game start: 12:00 p.m. PDT
- Elapsed time: 3 hours and 6 minutes
- Game attendance: 21,021
- Game weather: Temperature: 82 °F (28 °C) • Weather: Sunny • Wind: W 12 MPH
- Referee: David Alvarez
- TV announcers (Campus Insiders): Ryan Radtke (play–by–play) and Chris Vargas (analyst)

Scoring summary
2	04:46	NEV	James Butler 1–yard run (Brent Zuzo kick) (6 plays, 48 yards, 1:59)	NEV 7–0
3	09:19	NEV	Don Jackson 2–yard run (Brent Zuzo kick) (12 plays, 85 yards, 4:16)	NEV 14–0
3	08:32	SUU	Raysean Pringle 71–yard run (Trevor McGirr kick failed) (2 plays, 75 yards, 0:47)	NEV 14–6
3	03:22	NEV	Patrick Clifford 1–yard pass from Cody Fajardo (Brent Zuzo kick) (12 plays, 79 yards, 4:59)	NEV 21–6
4	11:47	NEV	Cody Fajardo 11–yard run (Brent Zuzo kick) (10 plays, 85 yards, 3:27)	NEV 28–6
4	10:16	SUU	Chris Robinson 39–yard pass from Aaron Cantu (Keita Calhoun kick) (6 plays, 82 yards, 1:25)	NEV 28–13
4	01:59	SUU	Miles Killebrew 85–yard interception (Malik Brown rush failed)	NEV 28–19

Statistics	Southern Utah	Nevada
First downs	16	30
Total yards	380	547
Rushing yards	156	244
Passing yards	224	303
Turnovers	2	2
Time of possession	19:02	40:58

Team	Category	Player	Statistics
Southern Utah	Passing	Aaron Cantu	20/31, 197 yards, 1 TD
Southern Utah	Rushing	Raysean Pringle	5 carries, 95 yards, 1 TD
Southern Utah	Receiving	Chris Robinson	7 receptions, 89 yards, 1 TD
Nevada	Passing	Cody Fajardo	30/41, 303 yards, 1 TD, 1 INT
Nevada	Rushing	Don Jackson	22 carries, 110 yards, 1 TD
Nevada	Receiving	Jerico Richardson	13 receptions, 177 yards

=== Washington State ===
Washington State at Nevada

Team	1	2	3	4	Total
Cougars	0	10	0	3	13
• Wolf Pack	7	7	0	10	24

- Date: September 5, 2014
- Location: Mackay Stadium
  Reno, NV
- Game start: 7:36 p.m. PDT
- Elapsed time: 3 hours and 28 minutes
- Game attendance: 26,023
- Game weather: Temperature: 81 °F (27 °C) • Weather: Perfect • Wind: E 4 MPH
- Referee: Brandon Cruse
- TV announcers (ESPN): Mark Neely (play–by–play), Mike Bellotti (analyst), and Shelley Smith (sideline)

Scoring summary
1	01:18	NEV	Don Jackson 1–yard run (Brent Zuzo kick) (4 plays, 12 yards, 1:27)	NEV 7–0
2	10:59	NEV	James Butler 1–yard run (Brent Zuzo kick) (10 plays, 91 yards, 3:49)	NEV 14–0
2	07:15	WSU	Vince Mayle 13–yard pass from Connor Halliday (Erik Powell kick) (5 plays, 80 yards, 1:32)	NEV 14–7
2	01:54	WSU	Erik Powell 25–yard field goal (13 plays, 62 yards, 3:56)	NEV 14–10
4	12:15	NEV	Don Jackson 2–yard run (Brent Zuzo kick) (14 plays, 79 yards, 5:34)	NEV 21–10
4	09:32	WSU	Quentin Breshears 38–yard field goal (8 plays, 39 yards, 2:37)	NEV 21–13
4	04:25	NEV	Brent Zuzo 40–yard field goal (12 plays, 52 yards, 5:07)	NEV 24–13

Statistics	Washington State	Nevada
First downs	25	17
Total yards	427	324
Rushing yards	38	214
Passing yards	389	110
Turnovers	0	0
Time of possession	27:08	32:52

Team	Category	Player	Statistics
Washington State	Passing	Connor Halliday	38/57, 389 yards, 1 TD, 2 INTs
Washington State	Rushing	Jamal Morrow	7 carries, 32 yards
Washington State	Receiving	Isiah Myers	9 receptions, 102 yards
Nevada	Passing	Cody Fajardo	12/21, 110 yards
Nevada	Rushing	Cody Fajardo	16 carries, 100 yards
Nevada	Receiving	Hasaan Henderson	6 receptions, 77 yards

=== At Arizona ===
Nevada at Arizona

Team	1	2	3	4	Total
Wolf Pack	3	10	8	7	28
• Wildcats	7	14	7	7	35

- Date: September 13, 2014
- Location: Arizona Stadium
  Tucson, AZ
- Game start: 8:07 p.m. PDT
- Elapsed time: 3 hours and 7 minutes
- Game attendance: 48,504
- Game weather: Temperature: 84 °F (29 °C) • Weather: Partly Cloudy • Wind: ENE 8 MPH
- Referee: Michael Mothershed
- TV announcers (P12N): Kevin Calabro (play–by–play), Yogi Roth (analyst), and Lewis Johnson (sideline)

Scoring summary
1	05:34	NEV	Brent Zuzo 22–yard field goal (19 plays, 70 yards, 9:26)	NEV 3–0
1	01:50	ARIZ	Nick Wilson 2–yard run (Casey Skowron kick) (12 plays, 86 yards, 3:37)	ARIZ 7–3
2	10:42	NEV	Brent Zuzo 21–yard field goal (13 plays, 71 yards, 6:08)	ARIZ 7–6
2	05:04	ARIZ	Nick Wilson 28–yard run (Casey Skowron kick) (8 plays, 76 yards, 2:40)	ARIZ 14–6
2	02:08	ARIZ	Tyrell Johnson 35–yard pass from Anu Solomon (Casey Skowron kick) (5 plays, 65 yards, 1:12)	ARIZ 21–6
2	00:08	NEV	Jarred Gipson 7–yard pass from Cody Fajardo (Brent Zuzo kick) (8 plays, 75 yards, 2:00)	ARIZ 21–13
3	06:03	NEV	Hasaan Henderson 6–yard pass from Cody Fajardo (Don Jackson rush) (16 plays, 84 yards, 7:13)	TIE 21–21
3	03:34	ARIZ	Cayleb Jones 22–yard pass from Anu Solomon (Casey Skowron kick) (7 plays, 75 yards, 2:24)	ARIZ 28–21
4	14:55	ARIZ	Cayleb Jones 24–yard pass from Anu Solomon (Casey Skowron kick) (5 plays, 51 yards, 1:35)	ARIZ 35–21
4	06:01	NEV	Jarred Gipson 6–yard pass from Cody Fajardo (Brent Zuzo kick) (8 plays, 74 yards, 3:10)	ARIZ 35–28

Statistics	Nevada	Arizona
First downs	25	26
Total yards	429	507
Rushing yards	108	229
Passing yards	321	278
Turnovers	0	1
Time of possession	35:48	24:12

Team	Category	Player	Statistics
Nevada	Passing	Cody Fajardo	29/39, 321 yards, 3 TDs
Nevada	Rushing	James Butler	13 carries, 50 yards
Nevada	Receiving	Richy Turner	7 receptions, 99 yards
Arizona	Passing	Anu Solomon	22/26, 278 yards, 3 TDs, 1 INT
Arizona	Rushing	Nick Wilson	29 carries, 171 yards, 2 TDs
Arizona	Receiving	Cayleb Jones	9 receptions, 116 yards, 2 TDs

=== At San Jose State ===
Nevada at San Jose State

Team	1	2	3	4	Total
• Wolf Pack	0	7	0	14	21
Spartans	0	3	7	0	10

- Date: September 27, 2014
- Location: Spartan Stadium
  San Jose, CA
- Game start: 7:39 p.m. PDT
- Elapsed time: 3 hours and 8 minutes
- Game attendance: 14,693
- Game weather: Temperature: 65 °F (18 °C) • Weather: Scattered Clouds • Wind: NNW 12 MPH
- Referee: Randy Christal
- TV announcers (CBSSN): Ben Holden (play–by–play), Adam Archuleta (analyst), and Cassie Gallo (sideline)

Scoring summary
2	12:09	NEV	Cody Fajardo 14–yard run (Brent Zuzo kick) (10 plays, 80 yards, 4:34)	NEV 7–0
2	00:00	SJSU	Austin Lopez 32–yard field goal (12 plays, 64 yards, 2:38)	NEV 7–3
3	12:20	SJSU	Tim Crawley 24–yard run (Austin Lopez kick) (6 plays, 75 yards, 2:40)	SJSU 10–7
4	12:43	NEV	Cody Fajardo 2–yard run (Brent Zuzo kick) (8 plays, 70 yards, 2:36)	NEV 14–10
4	09:06	NEV	Nigel Haikins 27–yard interception (Brent Zuzo kick)	NEV 21–10

Statistics	Nevada	San Jose State
First downs	16	24
Total yards	256	446
Rushing yards	192	170
Passing yards	64	276
Turnovers	0	2
Time of possession	23:47	36:13

Team	Category	Player	Statistics
Nevada	Passing	Cody Fajardo	10/18, 64 yards
Nevada	Rushing	Don Jackson	12 carries, 106 yards
Nevada	Receiving	Hasaan Henderson	2 receptions, 19 yards
San Jose State	Passing	Joe Gray	32/46, 276 yards, 2 INTs
San Jose State	Rushing	Tyler Ervin	12 carries, 56 yards
San Jose State	Receiving	Billy Freeman	6 receptions, 76 yards

=== Boise State ===
Boise State at Nevada
(rivalry)

Team	1	2	3	4	Total
• Broncos	13	17	14	7	51
Wolf Pack	7	14	8	17	46

- Date: October 4, 2014
- Location: Mackay Stadium
  Reno, NV
- Game start: 7:39 p.m. PDT
- Elapsed time: 3 hours and 39 minutes
- Game attendance: 32,327
- Game weather: Temperature: 70 °F (21 °C) • Weather: Calm • Wind: ESE 4 MPH
- Referee: Daniel Romeo
- TV announcers (CBSSN): Rich Waltz (play–by–play), Adam Archuleta (analyst), and Cassie Gallo (sideline)

Scoring summary
1	06:54	BSU	Jake Roh 3–yard pass from Grant Hedrick (Dan Goodale kick) (6 plays, 27 yards, 2:27)	BSU 7–0
1	05:13	NEV	Cody Fajardo 13–yard run (Brent Zuzo kick) (5 plays, 75 yards, 1:41)	TIE 7–7
1	02:11	BSU	Shane Williams-Rhodes 4–yard pass from Grant Hedrick (Dan Goodale kick blocked) (8 plays, 82 yards, 2:58)	BSU 13–7
2	13:36	NEV	Jarred Gipson 10–yard pass from Cody Fajardo (Brent Zuzo kick) (11 plays, 75 yards, 3:35)	NEV 14–13
2	08:59	BSU	Dan Goodale 35–yard field goal (12 plays, 62 yards, 4:32)	BSU 16–14
2	06:08	NEV	Jerico Richardson 12–yard pass from Cody Fajardo (Brent Zuzo kick) (8 plays, 75 yards, 2:51)	NEV 21–16
2	03:22	BSU	Tyler Gray 32–yard interception (Dan Goodale kick)	BSU 23–21
2	01:32	BSU	Grant Hedrick 2–yard run (Dan Goodale kick) (3 plays, 59 yards, 0:45)	BSU 30–21
3	12:38	BSU	Jay Ajayi 1–yard run (Dan Goodale kick) (3 plays, 29 yards, 1:03)	BSU 37–21
3	10:53	NEV	Cody Fajardo 56–yard run (Richy Turner pass) (4 plays, 79 yards, 1:40)	BSU 37–29
3	04:03	BSU	Jay Ajayi 26–yard run (Dan Goodale kick) (10 plays, 80 yards, 4:06)	BSU 44–29
4	14:18	NEV	Ian Seau 32–yard interception (Brent Zuzo kick)	BSU 44–36
4	13:22	BSU	Jay Ajayi 2–yard run (Dan Goodale kick) (2 plays, 79 yards, 0:52)	BSU 51–36
4	12:04	NEV	Jarred Gipson 12–yard pass from Cody Fajardo (Brent Zuzo kick) (4 plays, 75 yards, 1:18)	BSU 51–43
4	07:56	NEV	Brent Zuzo 45–yard field goal (9 plays, 14 yards, 3:34)	BSU 51–46

Statistics	Boise State	Nevada
First downs	25	24
Total yards	570	462
Rushing yards	224	156
Passing yards	346	306
Turnovers	6	1
Time of possession	34:42	25:18

Team	Category	Player	Statistics
Boise State	Passing	Grant Hedrick	26/31, 346 yards, 2 TDs, 1 INT
Boise State	Rushing	Jay Ajayi	27 carries, 152 yards, 3 TDs
Boise State	Receiving	Chaz Anderson	1 reception, 55 yards
Nevada	Passing	Cody Fajardo	23/43, 306 yards, 3 TDs, 4 INTs
Nevada	Rushing	Cody Fajardo	12 carries, 71 yards, 2 TDs
Nevada	Receiving	Hasaan Henderson	7 receptions, 141 yards

=== Colorado State ===
Colorado State at Nevada

Team	1	2	3	4	Total
• Rams	0	17	14	0	31
Wolf Pack	0	3	7	14	24

- Date: October 11, 2014
- Location: Mackay Stadium
  Reno, NV
- Game start: 7:39 p.m. PDT
- Elapsed time: 3 hours and 31 minutes
- Game attendance: 21,847
- Game weather: Temperature: 70 °F (21 °C) • Weather: Clear • Wind: WNW 6 MPH
- Referee: Greg Burks
- TV announcers (CBSSN): Ron Pitts (play–by–play), Eric Crouch (analyst), and Rashan Ali (sideline)

Scoring summary
2	09:00	CSU	Steven Walker 1–yard pass from Garrett Grayson (Jared Roberts kick) (8 plays, 65 yards, 3:11)	CSU 7–0
2	05:03	CSU	Rashard Higgins 42–yard pass from Garrett Grayson (Jared Roberts kick) (5 plays, 68 yards, 1:47)	CSU 14–0
2	02:07	CSU	Jared Roberts 33–yard field goal (5 plays, 8 yards, 1:53)	CSU 17–0
2	00:00	NEV	Brent Zuzo 21–yard field goal (10 plays, 72 yards, 2:07)	CSU 17–3
3	07:22	CSU	Rashard Higgins 51–yard pass from Garrett Grayson (Jared Roberts kick) (3 plays, 63 yards, 1:06)	CSU 24–3
3	04:48	CSU	Dee Hart 9–yard run (Jared Roberts kick) (4 plays, 48 yards, 1:22)	CSU 31–3
3	02:13	NEV	Cody Fajardo 13–yard run (Brent Zuzo kick) (7 plays, 63 yards, 2:28)	CSU 31–10
4	10:31	NEV	Hasaan Henderson 9–yard pass from Cody Fajardo (Brent Zuzo kick) (9 plays, 68 yards, 2:01)	CSU 31–17
4	06:22	NEV	Richy Turner 11–yard pass from Cody Fajardo (Brent Zuzo kick) (9 plays, 79 yards, 2:04)	CSU 31–24

Statistics	Colorado State	Nevada
First downs	21	25
Total yards	445	457
Rushing yards	119	160
Passing yards	326	297
Turnovers	2	1
Time of possession	29:41	30:19

Team	Category	Player	Statistics
Colorado State	Passing	Garrett Grayson	26/36, 326 yards, 3 TDs
Colorado State	Rushing	Dee Hart	23 carries, 90 yards, 1 TD
Colorado State	Receiving	Rashard Higgins	10 receptions, 194 yards, 2 TDs
Nevada	Passing	Cody Fajardo	27/50, 297 yards, 2 TDs, 1 INT
Nevada	Rushing	Cody Fajardo	12 carries, 88 yards, 1 TD
Nevada	Receiving	Jerico Richardson	10 receptions, 122 yards

=== At BYU ===
Nevada at BYU

Team	1	2	3	4	Total
• Wolf Pack	3	10	7	22	42
Cougars	7	21	0	7	35

- Date: October 18, 2014
- Location: LaVell Edwards Stadium
  Provo, UT
- Game start: 8:26 p.m. MDT
- Elapsed time: 3 hours and 35 minutes
- Game attendance: 56,355
- Game weather: Temperature: 61 °F (16 °C) • Weather: Partly Cloudy • Wind: NW 12 MPH
- Referee: David Alvarez
- TV announcers (ESPN2/BYU TV): Dave LaMont (play–by–play), Ray Bentley (analyst), and Dawn Davenport (sideline)/Dave McCann (play–by–play), Blaine Fowler (analyst), Andy Boyce (sideline), and Lauren Francom (sideline)

Scoring summary
1	11:13	NEV	Brent Zuzo 44–yard field goal (11 plays, 49 yards, 3:47)	NEV 3–0
1	04:00	BYU	Paul Lasike 1–yard run (Trevor Samson kick) (12 plays, 97 yards, 3:03)	BYU 7–3
2	14:41	BYU	Paul Lasike 20–yard pass from Christian Stewart (Trevor Samson kick) (14 plays, 72 yards, 2:52)	BYU 14–3
2	13:40	NEV	James Butler 9–yard run (Brent Zuzo kick) (3 plays, 75 yards, 1:01)	BYU 14–10
2	11:48	BYU	Mitch Mathews 20–yard pass from Christian Stewart (Trevor Samson kick) (6 plays, 60 yards, 1:42)	BYU 21–10
2	05:24	NEV	Brent Zuzo 26–yard field goal (14 plays, 57 yards, 6:24)	BYU 21–13
2	01:00	BYU	Mitch Mathews 11–yard pass from Christian Stewart (Trevor Samson kick) (16 plays, 90 yards, 4:11)	BYU 28–13
3	08:16	NEV	Cody Fajardo 1–yard run (Brent Zuzo kick) (13 plays, 74 yards, 5:04)	BYU 28–20
4	11:18	NEV	Richy Turner 18–yard pass from Cody Fajardo (Hasaan Henderson pass) (11 plays, 48 yards, 4:50)	TIE 28–28
4	07:34	NEV	Cody Fajardo 25–yard run (Brent Zuzo kick) (5 plays, 49 yards, 2:14)	NEV 35–28
4	05:54	NEV	James Butler 6–yard run (Brent Zuzo kick) (3 plays, 20 yards, 1:26)	NEV 42–28
4	02:34	BYU	Keanu Nelson 8–yard pass from Christian Stewart (Trevor Samson kick) (15 plays, 75 yards, 3:20)	NEV 42–35

Statistics	Nevada	BYU
First downs	20	38
Total yards	411	601
Rushing yards	126	193
Passing yards	285	408
Turnovers	0	6
Time of possession	33:11	26:49

Team	Category	Player	Statistics
Nevada	Passing	Cody Fajardo	26/40, 285 yards, 1 TD
Nevada	Rushing	Don Jackson	18 carries, 62 yards
Nevada	Receiving	Don Jackson	3 receptions, 95 yards
BYU	Passing	Christian Stewart	39/63, 408 yards, 4 TDs
BYU	Rushing	Nate Carter	7 carries, 87 yards
BYU	Receiving	Mitch Mathews	16 receptions, 182 yards, 2 TDs

=== At Hawaii ===
Nevada at Hawaii

Team	1	2	3	4	Total
• Wolf Pack	0	6	10	10	26
Rainbow Warriors	7	3	0	8	18

- Date: October 25, 2014
- Location: Aloha Stadium
  Halawa, HI
- Game start: 6:07 p.m.
- Elapsed time: 3 hours and 21 minutes
- Game attendance: 27,061
- Game weather: Temperature: 81 °F (27 °C) • Weather: Partly Cloudy • Wind: E 9 MPH
- Referee: Kevin Mar
- TV announcers (Campus Insiders/Oceanic PPV): Robert Kekaula (play–by–play), Rich Miano (analyst), and Scott Robbs (sideline)

Scoring summary
1	00:16	UH	Donnie King Jr. 38–yard pass from Ikaika Woolsey (Tyler Hadden kick) (4 plays, 75 yards, 1:36)	UH 7–0
2	04:05	UH	Tyler Hadden 36–yard field goal (11 plays, 52 yards, 5:07)	UH 10–0
2	00:52	NEV	Cody Fajardo 6–yard run (Brent Zuzo kick failed) (8 plays, 54 yards, 3:06)	UH 10–6
3	09:27	NEV	Brent Zuzo 22–yard field goal (14 plays, 72 yards, 5:33)	UH 10–9
3	03:47	NEV	Cody Fajardo 8–yard run (Brent Zuzo kick) (10 plays, 67 yards, 4:16)	NEV 16–10
4	07:35	NEV	Brent Zuzo 20–yard field goal (19 plays, 85 yards, 9:30)	NEV 19–10
4	02:28	NEV	Hasaan Henderson 16–yard pass from Cody Fajardo (Brent Zuzo kick) (11 plays, 41 yards, 4:27)	NEV 26–10
4	00:40	UH	Steven Lakalaka 5–yard pass (Quinton Pedroza pass) (11 plays, 63 yards, 1:39)	NEV 26–18

Statistics	Nevada	Hawaii
First downs	26	16
Total yards	427	303
Rushing yards	295	100
Passing yards	132	203
Turnovers	0	2
Time of possession	37:26	22:34

Team	Category	Player	Statistics
Nevada	Passing	Cody Fajardo	18/27, 132 yards, 1 TD, 1 INT
Nevada	Rushing	Cody Fajardo	23 carries, 133 yards, 2 TDs
Nevada	Receiving	Hasaan Henderson	6 receptions, 47 yards, 1 TD
Hawaii	Passing	Ikaika Woolsey	20/34, 203 yards, 1 TD, 1 INT
Hawaii	Rushing	Steven Lakalaka	15 carries, 55 yards, 1 TD
Hawaii	Receiving	Marcus Kemp	4 receptions, 59 yards

=== San Diego State ===
San Diego State at Nevada

Team	1	2	3	4	Total
Aztecs	7	7	0	0	14
• Wolf Pack	3	7	3	17	30

- Date: November 1, 2014
- Location: Mackay Stadium
  Reno, NV
- Game start: 7:40 p.m. PDT
- Elapsed time: 3 hours and 25 minutes
- Game attendance: 20,508
- Game weather: Temperature: 49 °F (9 °C) • Weather: Cool • Wind: W 8 MPH
- Referee: Eddy Shelton
- TV announcers (CBSSN): Ben Holden (play–by–play), Kevin O'Connell (analyst), and Courtney Fallon (sideline)

Scoring summary
1	02:39	SDSU	Chase Price 1–yard run (Donny Hageman kick) (7 plays, 55 yards, 3:37)	SDSU 7–0
1	00:22	NEV	Brent Zuzo 37–yard field goal (7 plays, 20 yards, 2:09)	SDSU 7–3
2	14:06	NEV	Richy Turner 20–yard pass from Cody Fajardo (Brent Zuzo kick) (2 plays, 20 yards, 0:44)	NEV 10–7
2	01:15	SDSU	Jemond Hazely 21–yard pass from Quinn Kaehler (Donny Hageman kick) (7 plays, 77 yards, 2:12)	SDSU 14–10
3	09:32	NEV	Brent Zuzo 25–yard field goal (13 plays, 58 yards, 5:28)	SDSU 14–13
4	11:42	NEV	Brent Zuzo 24–yard field goal (9 plays, 45 yards, 5:00)	NEV 16–14
4	07:06	NEV	James Butler 43–yard run (Brent Zuzo kick) (5 plays, 65 yards, 2:36)	NEV 23–14
4	01:40	NEV	Don Jackson 1–yard run (Brent Zuzo kick) (6 plays, 65 yards, 2:26)	NEV 30–14

Statistics	San Diego State	Nevada
First downs	17	17
Total yards	324	338
Rushing yards	135	229
Passing yards	189	109
Turnovers	5	0
Time of possession	27:39	32:21

Team	Category	Player	Statistics
San Diego State	Passing	Quinn Kaehler	21/36, 189 yards, 1 TD, 1 INT
San Diego State	Rushing	Donnel Pumphrey	13 carries, 85 yards
San Diego State	Receiving	Lloyd Mills	3 receptions, 52 yards
Nevada	Passing	Cody Fajardo	10/24, 109 yards, 1 TD, 1 INT
Nevada	Rushing	Don Jackson	20 carries, 124 yards, 1 TD
Nevada	Receiving	Richy Turner	3 receptions, 49 yards, 1 TD

=== At Air Force ===
Nevada at Air Force

Team	1	2	3	4	OT	Total
Wolf Pack	0	14	7	17	0	38
• Falcons	7	14	7	10	7	45

- Date: November 15, 2014
- Location: Falcon Stadium
  Colorado Springs, CO
- Game start: 12:08 p.m. MST
- Elapsed time: 3 hours and 22 minutes
- Game attendance: 11,519
- Game weather: Temperature: 31 °F (−1 °C) • Weather: Partly Cloudy • Wind: N 17 MPH
- Referee: Cooper Castleberry
- TV announcers (RTRM): Ari Wolfe (play–by–play), Sherdrick Bonner (analyst), and Ally Sturm (sideline)

Scoring summary
1	08:46	AF	Jalen Robinette 6–yard pass from Kale Pearson (Will Conant kick) (13 plays, 75 yards, 6:14)	AF 7–0
2	14:18	NEV	Hasaan Henderson 25–yard pass from Cody Fajardo (Brent Zuzo kick) (5 plays, 86 yards, 1:55)	TIE 7–7
2	09:01	AF	Shayne Davern 1–yard run (Will Conant kick) (13 plays, 82 yards, 5:10)	AF 14–7
2	01:30	NEV	Don Jackson 1–yard run (Brent Zuzo kick) (19 plays, 75 yards, 7:31)	TIE 14–14
2	00:08	AF	Jalen Robinette 6–yard pass from Kale Pearson (Will Conant kick) (9 plays, 62 yards, 1:16)	AF 21–14
3	09:59	NEV	Don Jackson 32–yard run (Brent Zuzo kick) (11 plays, 75 yards, 5:01)	TIE 21–21
3	04:03	AF	Garrett Brown 25–yard pass from Kale Pearson (Will Conant kick) (10 plays, 56 yards, 3:57)	AF 28–21
4	14:26	NEV	Don Jackson 1–yard run (Brent Zuzo kick) (11 plays, 75 yards, 4:33)	TIE 28–28
4	10:23	AF	Will Conant 23–yard field goal (10 plays, 65 yards, 4:03)	AF 31–28
4	07:03	NEV	Jerico Richardson 21–yard pass from Cody Fajardo (Brent Zuzo kick) (8 plays, 75 yards, 3:20)	NEV 35–31
4	04:13	AF	Kale Pearson 16–yard run (Will Conant kick) (7 plays, 61 yards, 2:44)	AF 38–35
4	00:12	NEV	Brent Zuzo 22–yard field goal (5 plays, 43 yards, 1:13)	TIE 38–38
OT	15:00	AF	Shayne Davern 3–yard run (Will Conant kick) (5 plays, 25 yards, 0:00)	AF 45–38

Statistics	Nevada	Air Force
First downs	27	28
Total yards	498	471
Rushing yards	223	342
Passing yards	275	129
Turnovers	0	1
Time of possession	30:57	29:03

Team	Category	Player	Statistics
Nevada	Passing	Cody Fajardo	24/36, 275 yards, 2 TDs, 1 INT
Nevada	Rushing	Don Jackson	28 carries, 121 yards, 3 TDs
Nevada	Receiving	Hasaan Henderson	5 receptions, 74 yards, 1 TD
Air Force	Passing	Kale Pearson	11/15, 129 yards, 3 TDs
Air Force	Rushing	Kale Pearson	16 carries, 109 yards, 1 TD
Air Force	Receiving	Garrett Brown	3 receptions, 49 yards, 1 TD

=== Fresno State ===
Fresno State at Nevada

Team	1	2	3	4	Total
• Bulldogs	7	21	10	2	40
Wolf Pack	7	13	0	0	20

- Date: November 22, 2014
- Location: Mackay Stadium
  Reno, NV
- Game start: 7:36 p.m. PST
- Elapsed time: 3 hours and 55 minutes
- Game attendance: 21,446
- Game weather: Temperature: 37 °F (3 °C) • Weather: Clear • Wind: 5 MPH
- Referee: Brandon Cruse
- TV announcers (ESPNU): Shawn Kenney (play–by–play) and Dan Hawkins (analyst)

Scoring summary
1	03:29	FS	Josh Harper 19–yard pass from Brian Burrell (Kody Kroening kick) (4 plays, 32 yards, 1:30)	FS 7–0
1	02:56	NEV	Cody Fajardo 55–yard run (Brent Zuzo kick) (2 plays, 75 yards, 0:33)	TIE 7–7
2	14:01	NEV	Cody Fajardo 60–yard run (Brent Zuzo kick) (7 plays, 82 yards, 2:41)	NEV 14–7
2	12:23	FS	Aaron Peck 13–yard pass from Brian Burrell (Kody Kroening kick) (7 plays, 81 yards, 1:34)	TIE 14–14
2	09:06	FS	Greg Watson 30–yard pass from Brian Burrell (Kody Kroening kick) (5 plays, 51 yards, 1:48)	FS 21–14
2	02:06	NEV	Don Jackson 14–yard pass from Cody Fajardo (Brent Zuzo kick failed) (3 plays, 14 yards, 0:55)	FS 21–20
2	00:32	FS	Brian Burrell 1–yard run (Kody Kroening kick) (8 plays, 55 yards, 1:17)	FS 28–20
3	13:04	FS	Aaron Peck 26–yard pass from Brian Burrell (Kody Kroening kick) (5 plays, 44 yards, 1:46)	FS 35–20
3	09:29	FS	Kody Kroening 32–yard field goal (4 plays, 5 yards, 0:27)	FS 38–20
4	10:21	FS	Team 2–yard safety	FS 40–20

Statistics	Fresno State	Nevada
First downs	29	13
Total yards	551	353
Rushing yards	238	227
Passing yards	313	126
Turnovers	3	6
Time of possession	35:35	24:25

Team	Category	Player	Statistics
Fresno State	Passing	Brian Burrell	25/46, 313 yards, 4 TDs, 1 INT
Fresno State	Rushing	Josh Quezada	24 carries, 119 yards
Fresno State	Receiving	Greg Watson	4 receptions, 89 yards, 1 TD
Nevada	Passing	Cody Fajardo	11/24, 126 yards, 1 TD, 1 INT
Nevada	Rushing	Cody Fajardo	22 carries, 165 yards, 2 TDs
Nevada	Receiving	Jerico Richardson	4 receptions, 40 yards

=== At UNLV ===
Nevada at UNLV
(Battle for the Fremont Cannon / Governor's Series)

Team	1	2	3	4	Total
• Wolf Pack	7	7	21	14	49
Rebels	7	10	3	7	27

- Date: November 29, 2014
- Location: Sam Boyd Stadium
  Whitney, NV
- Game start: 7:36 p.m. PST
- Elapsed time: 3 hours and 23 minutes
- Game attendance: 20,151
- Game weather: Temperature: 64 °F (18 °C) • Weather: Clear • Wind: SSE 15 MPH
- Referee: David Alvarez
- TV announcers (ESPNU): Jason Benetti (play–by–play) and Mike Bellotti (analyst)

Scoring summary
1	08:25	NEV	Cody Fajardo 25–yard run (Brent Zuzo kick) (7 plays, 80 yards, 3:21)	NEV 7–0
1	04:52	UNLV	Devante Davis 3–yard pass from Blake Decker (Jonathan Leiva kick) (10 plays, 75 yards, 3:33)	TIE 7–7
2	10:33	UNLV	Devonte Boyd 24–yard pass from Blake Decker (Jonathan Leiva kick) (3 plays, 47 yards, 0:53)	UNLV 14–7
2	07:31	UNLV	Jonathan Leiva 44–yard field goal (8 plays, 22 yards, 2:15)	UNLV 17–7
2	01:31	NEV	Richy Turner 18–yard pass from Cody Fajardo (Brent Zuzo kick) (7 plays, 52 yards, 3:00)	UNLV 17–14
3	09:33	NEV	Jerico Richardson 12–yard pass from Cody Fajardo (Brent Zuzo kick) (11 plays, 87 yards, 5:24)	NEV 21–17
3	07:00	UNLV	Jonathan Leiva 23–yard field goal (8 plays, 46 yards, 2:25)	NEV 21–20
3	05:08	NEV	Kendall Brock 3–yard pass from Cody Fajardo (Brent Zuzo kick) (5 plays, 74 yards, 1:44)	NEV 28–20
3	04:15	NEV	Lenny Jones 32–yard interception (Brent Zuzo kick)	NEV 35–20
4	11:47	NEV	Jerico Richardson 4–yard run (Brent Zuzo kick) (2 plays, 17 yards, 1:11)	NEV 42–20
4	06:51	NEV	Devin Combs 5–yard run (Brent Zuzo kick) (6 plays, 56 yards, 3:31)	NEV 49–20
4	05:37	UNLV	Shaquille Murray-Lawrence 12–yard run (Jonathan Leiva kick) (5 plays, 71 yards, 1:07)	NEV 49–27

Statistics	Nevada	UNLV
First downs	21	25
Total yards	454	376
Rushing yards	408	205
Passing yards	46	171
Turnovers	1	2
Time of possession	33:39	26:21

Team	Category	Player	Statistics
Nevada	Passing	Cody Fajardo	5/13, 46 yards, 3 TDs, 1 INT
Nevada	Rushing	Cody Fajardo	13 carries, 143 yards, 1 TD
Nevada	Receiving	Richy Turner	1 reception, 18 yards, 1 TD
UNLV	Passing	Blake Decker	21/39, 171 yards, 2 TDs, 3 INTs
UNLV	Rushing	Shaquille Murray-Lawrence	21 carries, 135 yards, 1 TD
UNLV	Receiving	Devonte Boyd	4 receptions, 61 yards, 1 TD

=== Vs. Louisiana–Lafayette (New Orleans Bowl) ===
Nevada vs. Louisiana–Lafayette
(New Orleans Bowl)

Team	1	2	3	4	Total
Wolf Pack	0	3	0	0	3
• Ragin' Cajuns	10	0	0	6	16

- Date: December 20, 2014
- Location: Mercedes-Benz Superdome
  New Orleans, LA
- Game start: 10:00 a.m. CST
- Elapsed time: 3 hours and 1 minute
- Game attendance: 34,014
- Game weather: Temperature: 51 °F (11 °C) • Weather: N/A (Indoor Stadium) • Wind: NNE 12 MPH
- Referee: Greg Blum
- TV announcers (ESPN/ESPN Radio): Bob Wischusen (play–by–play), Mack Brown (analyst), and Kaylee Hartung (sideline)/Bill Rosinski (play-by-play), David Norrie (analyst), and Joe Schad (sideline)

Scoring summary
1	11:26	ULL	C.J. Bates 17–yard pass from Terrance Broadway (Hunter Stover kick) (8 plays, 77 yards, 3:34)	ULL 7–0
1	02:55	ULL	Hunter Stover 46–yard field goal (13 plays, 60 yards, 6:58)	ULL 10–0
2	02:42	NEV	Brent Zuzo 21–yard field goal (8 plays, 23 yards, 3:20)	ULL 10–3
4	11:51	ULL	Hunter Stover 30–yard field goal (15 plays, 77 yards, 7:25)	ULL 13–3
4	04:46	ULL	Hunter Stover 35–yard field goal (9 plays, 47 yards, 4:15)	ULL 16–3

Statistics	Nevada	Louisiana–Lafayette
First downs	13	26
Total yards	213	411
Rushing yards	89	184
Passing yards	124	227
Turnovers	2	2
Time of possession	23:06	36:54

Team	Category	Player	Statistics
Nevada	Passing	Cody Fajardo	14/29, 124 yards
Nevada	Rushing	Cody Fajardo	13 carries, 49 yards
Nevada	Receiving	Richy Turner	5 receptions, 46 yards
Louisiana–Lafayette	Passing	Terrance Broadway	26/31, 227 yards, 1 TD
Louisiana–Lafayette	Rushing	Elijah McGuire	16 carries, 99 yards
Louisiana–Lafayette	Receiving	Elijah McGuire	5 receptions, 54 yards

== Roster ==
2014 Nevada Wolf Pack football team roster
Players
Coaches
Offense

Pos.	#	Name	Class
WR	2	Richy Turner	Sr
RB	3	Kendall Brock	Sr
RB	6	Don Jackson	Jr
QB	11	Hunter Fralick	Fr
QB	12	Hasaan Henderson	So
QB	13	Devin Combs	Sr
QB	14	Dante Mayes	Fr
QB	15	Tyler Stewart	So
QB	16	Jake Young	Fr
QB	17	Cody Fajardo (C)	Sr
RB	20	James Butler	Fr
WR	22	Jimbo Davis IV	Fr
WR	23	Brandon Thompson	Fr
RB	25	Lonell Woodhouse	Fr
WR	26	Jerimiah Sims	Jr
WR	29	Malcom Lee	Fr
TE	30	Trae Carter-Wells	Fr
WR	31	Randy Uzoma	So
RB	33	Blake Wright	Fr
RB	39	Nate McLaurin	Sr
WR	43	Chaz Clark	Fr
TE	44	Patrick Clifford	So
TE	45	Austin Carrow	So
TE	47	Jarred Gipson	So
OL	48	Zach Brickell	Jr
OL	54	Nathan Golden	Fr
OL	57	Connor Talbott	Jr
OL	59	Jonathan Eitzman	Fr
OL	60	Adam Khouri	Fr
OL	61	Joey Anglemire	Fr
OL	62	Nathan Goltry	Jr
OL	63	Daren Echeveria	Fr
OL	64	Shane Cannon	So
OL	65	Matt Galas	Sr
OL	66	Kyle Roberts	Sr
OL	67	Chad Specht	Fr
OL	68	Brent Roling	Jr
OL	70	Humberto Lopez	Jr
OL	72	Jeremy Macauley	So
OL	73	Austin Corbett	Fr
OL	74	Taylor Evans	Jr
OL	75	Mat McDermand	Fr
OL	76	Bryce Spring	So
OL	77	Ziad Damanhoury	Fr
OL	79	Jacob Henry	So
WR	80	Wyatt Demps	Fr
WR	81	De'Andre Fuller	Fr
WR	82	Tucker Melcher	Fr
WR	83	Andrew Celis	Fr
WR	84	Jerico Richardson	So
TE	85	Matt Moen	Fr
TE	86	Brandon Scott	Fr
WR	87	Bradyen Sanchez	So
WR	89	Kameron Richardson	So
OL	91	Kalei Meyer	Fr
OL	92	Jordan Hanson	Sr
OL	96	Tyler Wilson	So
OL	97	Salesa Faraimo	So

Defense

Pos.	#	Name	Class
DB	3	Kaodi Dike	So
DB	4	Kyle LeBlanc	Fr
LB	5	Fie Faaituala	Jr
DB	7	Duran Workman	Jr
DL	8	Ian Seau	Jr
LB	9	Matthew Lyons	Jr
DB	11	Aaron Kelley	Jr
DB	12	Dustin Treick	So
DB	15	Tully McCalister	Fr
DB	18	Elijah Moody	Fr
DB	19	Evan Favors	Sr
DB	19	Jaden Sawyer	Fr
DB	20	Chris Ayiyi	Jr
DB	22	Asauni Rufus	Fr
DB	23	Nigel Haikins	Sr
DB	24	Charles Garrett	Sr
LB	24	Lucas Weber	Fr
DB	25	Bryan Lane Jr.	Jr
DB	26	Kendall Johnson	Fr
DB	28	Elijah Mitchell	So
DB	29	L.J. Jackson	So
DB	30	Tere Calloway	Fr
DB	32	Devoreaux Stewart	So
LB	34	Travis Wilson	So
DB	35	Ahki Muhammad	Fr
LB	36	Jarid Joseph	Fr
LB	38	Jake Lacaden	Fr
DB	39	David Kruskamp	Fr
LB	39	Trent Mahler	So
DB	42	Julian Brooks	Fr
LB	45	Kyle Rothschiller	So
LB	48	Austin Fletcher	Fr
LB	49	Jordan Dobrich	Jr
LB	50	Jonathan McNeal	Sr
LB	51	Colton Concellos	So
LB	52	Trevor Taft	Jr
DL	53	Brock Hekking	Sr
DL	55	Rykeem Yates	Jr
LB	56	Alex Bertrando	So
DL	58	Nolan Dambacher	So
DL	59	Marc Ma	Fr
DL	69	Thomas Newton	Fr
DL	71	Kevin Sundberg	Fr
DL	78	Adam Rockwell	So
DB	88	Giles Chapman	So
LB	90	Malik Reed	Fr
DL	93	Dupree Roberts-Jordan	Sr
DL	94	Lenny Jones	Jr
DL	95	Patrick Choudja	Fr
DL	98	Jeremy Miller	Jr
DL	99	Korey Rush	Fr

Special teams

Pos.	#	Name	Class
PK	40	Brent Zuzo	So
P	46	Alex Boy	So

Head coach

- Brian Polian

Coordinators/assistant coaches

- Nick Rolovich – Offensive coordinator/quarterbacks
- Scott Boone – Co–Defensive coordinator/linebackers
- Bill Teerlinck – Co–Defensive coordinator/defensive line
- Jim Hofher – Assistant head coach/wide receivers
- Lester Erb – Running backs/special teams
- Mike Bradeson – Recruiting coordinator/safeties
- Ron Hudson – Offensive line
- Cheston Blackshear – Tight ends
- Ricky Thomas – Cornerbacks
- John Decoster – Graduate assistant (Offense)
- Pat Denecke – Graduate assistant (Defense)
- Nate Dolan – Graduate assistant (Defense)
- Steven King – Graduate assistant (Offense)

Support staff

- David Fox – Director of football administration
- Andy Vaughn – Director of football and recruiting operations

Legend

- (C) Team captain
- (S) Suspended
- (I) Ineligible
- Injured
- Redshirt

Roster
Last update: February 4, 2021
