= 2014 Utah State Aggies football team =

American college football season

2014 Utah State Aggies football

New Mexico Bowl champion

New Mexico Bowl, W 21–6 vs. UTEP
- Conference: Mountain West Conference
- Mountain Division
- Record: 10–4 (6–2 MW)
- Head coach: Matt Wells (2nd season)
- Offensive coordinator: Kevin McGiven (2nd season)
- Offensive scheme: Spread
- Defensive coordinator: Todd Orlando (2nd season)
- Base defense: 3–4
- Home stadium: Romney Stadium

2014 Mountain West Conference football standings
	Conf.			Overall
Team	W		L	W		L
Mountain Division
No. 16 Boise State x$	7	–	1	12	–	2
Colorado State	6	–	2	10	–	3
Utah State	6	–	2	10	–	4
Air Force	5	–	3	10	–	3
New Mexico	2	–	6	4	–	8
Wyoming	2	–	6	4	–	8
West Division
Fresno State x	5	–	3	6	–	8
San Diego State	5	–	3	7	–	6
Nevada	4	–	4	7	–	6
Hawaii	3	–	5	4	–	9
San Jose State	2	–	6	3	–	9
UNLV	1	–	7	2	–	11
Championship: Boise State 28, Fresno State 14
$ – Conference champion; x – Division champion/co-champions; Rankings from AP Poll

The 2014 Utah State Aggies football team represented Utah State University in the 2014 NCAA Division I FBS football season. The Aggies were led by second-year head coach Matt Wells and played their home games at Merlin Olsen Field at Romney Stadium. This was the Aggies second season as members of the Mountain West Conference in the Mountain Division. They finished the season 10–4, 6–2 in Mountain West play to finish in a tie for second place in the Mountain Division. They were invited to the New Mexico Bowl where they defeated UTEP 21–6.

== Before the season ==
=== 2014 recruits ===
College recruiting (2014)
Name	Hometown	School	Height	Weight	Commit date
Adewale Adeoye; LB	St. Louis	Ritenour	6 ft 4 in (1.93 m)	235 lb (107 kg)	Feb 3, 2014
Adewale Adeoye; LB	Recruit ratings: Scout: Rivals: 247Sports:				
Demytrick Ali'ifua; OL	San Leandro, California	San Leandro	6 ft 3 in (1.91 m)	280 lb (130 kg)	Jul 5, 2013
Demytrick Ali'ifua; OL	Recruit ratings: Scout: Rivals: 247Sports:				
Chase Christiansen; LB	Tooele, Utah	Stansbury	6 ft 2 in (1.88 m)	210 lb (95 kg)	Feb 3, 2014
Chase Christiansen; LB	Recruit ratings: Scout: Rivals: 247Sports:				
Preston Curtis; RB	Salt Lake City	East	5 ft 10 in (1.78 m)	180 lb (82 kg)	Jan 17, 2014
Preston Curtis; RB	Recruit ratings: Scout: Rivals: 247Sports:				
Jalen Davis; DB	La Mesa, California	Helix	5 ft 9 in (1.75 m)	165 lb (75 kg)	Jan 20, 2014
Jalen Davis; DB	Recruit ratings: Scout: Rivals: 247Sports:				
Edmund Falamalo; DT	Redlands, California	Riverside C.C.	6 ft 3 in (1.91 m)	290 lb (130 kg)	Feb 5, 2014
Edmund Falamalo; DT	Recruit ratings: Rivals: 247Sports:				
Baron Gajkowski; S	Alpine, Utah	Lone Peak	6 ft 2 in (1.88 m)	200 lb (91 kg)	Feb 5, 2014
Baron Gajkowski; S	Recruit ratings: Scout: Rivals: 247Sports:				
Derek Hastings; TE	Lehi, Utah	Lehi	6 ft 3 in (1.91 m)	250 lb (110 kg)	Feb 5, 2014
Derek Hastings; TE	Recruit ratings: Scout: Rivals: 247Sports:				
Justin Hervey; RB	Beaumont, Texas	Westbrook	5 ft 9 in (1.75 m)	180 lb (82 kg)	Feb 5, 2014
Justin Hervey; RB	Recruit ratings: Scout: Rivals: 247Sports:				
Deshane Hines; DB	San Mateo, California	College of San Mateo	5 ft 11 in (1.80 m)	180 lb (82 kg)	Jan 27, 2014
Deshane Hines; DB	Recruit ratings: Scout: Rivals: 247Sports:				
Landon Horne; TE	Ephraim, Utah	Snow College	6 ft 3 in (1.91 m)	240 lb (110 kg)	Jan 8, 2014
Landon Horne; TE	Recruit ratings: Scout: Rivals: 247Sports:				
Lajuan Hunt; RB	Fort Lauderdale, Florida	University School	5 ft 9 in (1.75 m)	192 lb (87 kg)	Jan 25, 2014
Lajuan Hunt; RB	Recruit ratings: Scout: Rivals: 247Sports:				
Marcus Mosely; TE	Tampa, Florida	Alonso	6 ft 4 in (1.93 m)	210 lb (95 kg)	Dec 22, 2013
Marcus Mosely; TE	Recruit ratings: Scout: Rivals: 247Sports:				
Kent Myers; ATH	Sachse, Texas	Sachse	6 ft 1 in (1.85 m)	180 lb (82 kg)	Jan 27, 2014
Kent Myers; ATH	Recruit ratings: Scout: Rivals: 247Sports:				
Logan Rice; OL	Logan, Utah	Logan	6 ft 6 in (1.98 m)	225 lb (102 kg)	Feb 5, 2014
Logan Rice; OL	Recruit ratings: Scout: Rivals: 247Sports:				
Devonte Robinson; WR	Dodge City, Kansas	Dodge City C.C.	6 ft 2 in (1.88 m)	185 lb (84 kg)	Feb 5, 2014
Devonte Robinson; WR	Recruit ratings: Scout: Rivals: 247Sports:				
Jontrell Rocquemore; DB	McKinney, Texas	McKinney	6 ft 2 in (1.88 m)	185 lb (84 kg)	Feb 5, 2014
Jontrell Rocquemore; DB	Recruit ratings: Scout: Rivals: 247Sports:				
Gasetoto Schuster; DT	Long Beach, California	Poly	6 ft 3 in (1.91 m)	270 lb (120 kg)	Nov 24, 2013
Gasetoto Schuster; DT	Recruit ratings: Scout: Rivals: 247Sports:				
Hunter Sharp; WR	Lancaster, California	Antelope Valley C.C.	6 ft 1 in (1.85 m)	190 lb (86 kg)	Dec 15, 2013
Hunter Sharp; WR	Recruit ratings: Scout: Rivals: 247Sports:				
Siua Taufa; DT	Pleasant Hill, California	Diablo Valley C.C.	6 ft 2 in (1.88 m)	270 lb (120 kg)	Jan 1, 2014
Siua Taufa; DT	Recruit ratings: Scout: Rivals: 247Sports:				
John Taylor; DE	Riverside, California	Riverside C.C.	6 ft 2 in (1.88 m)	265 lb (120 kg)	Feb 5, 2014
John Taylor; DE	Recruit ratings: Rivals: 247Sports:				
Ian Togiai; LB	West Valley City, Utah	Hunter	6 ft 2 in (1.88 m)	230 lb (100 kg)	Feb 5, 2014
Ian Togiai; LB	Recruit ratings: Scout: Rivals:				
Joe Tukuafu; TE	Salt Lake City, Utah	East	6 ft 4 in (1.93 m)	230 lb (100 kg)	Feb 4, 2014
Joe Tukuafu; TE	Recruit ratings: Scout: Rivals: 247Sports:				
Mohelika Uasike; DL	North Richland Hills, Texas	L.D. Bell	6 ft 2 in (1.88 m)	300 lb (140 kg)	Feb 4, 2014
Mohelika Uasike; DL	Recruit ratings: Scout: Rivals: 247Sports:				
Christopher 'Unga; DL	Rancho Cucamonga, California	Rancho Cucamonga	6 ft 1 in (1.85 m)	280 lb (130 kg)	Feb 4, 2014
Christopher 'Unga; DL	Recruit ratings: Scout: Rivals: 247Sports:				
Aaron Wade; ATH	Lithia, Florida	Newsome	6 ft 2 in (1.88 m)	188 lb (85 kg)	Feb 5, 2014
Aaron Wade; ATH	Recruit ratings: Scout: Rivals: 247Sports:				
Overall recruit ranking: Scout: 94 Rivals: 106 ESPN: Not Ranked Top 25
Note: In many cases, Scout, Rivals, 247Sports, On3, and ESPN may conflict in their listings of height and weight.; In these cases, the average was taken. ESPN grades are on a 100-point scale.; Sources: "Utah State 2014 Football Commitments". Rivals.; "2014 Utah State Football Commits". Scout.; "2014 Player Commits". ESPN.; "Scout.com Team Recruiting Rankings". Scout.; "2014 Team Ranking". Rivals.com.

=== Blue and White Game ===
The spring Blue and White Game took place on April 12, 2014. The game came down to a field goal in the last second. (PK) Nick Diaz converted a 39-yard field-goal to give the offense (Blue) the win over the defense (White) 78–77 in the last second.

=== Departures ===
Among the notable departures were most of the starting offensive line including four-year starter (C) Tyler Larsen and three-year starter (G) Eric Schultz. The Aggies also lost defensive line coach Frank Maile to Vanderbilt.

==== NFL draft ====
Name	Number	Pos.	Class	Team	Round	Pick
Nevin Lawson	1	CB	Senior	Detroit Lions	4	133
Maurice "Mo" Alexander	5	S	Senior	St. Louis Rams	4	110

== Roster ==
2014 Utah State Aggies football team roster
Players
Coaches
Offense

Pos.	#	Name	Class
QB	2	Kent Myers	Fr
WR	3	Devonte Robinson	Jr
WR	4	Hunter Sharp	Jr
WR	9	JoJo Natson	Jr
QB	10	Darell Garretson (injured)	So
WR	11	Brandon Swindall (injured)	Jr
QB	12	Craig Harrison (injured)	Sr
WR	14	Shaan Johnson	Sr
QB	16	Chuckie Keeton (injured)	Sr
WR	17	Zach Van Leeuwen	Fr
WR	18	Ronald Butler	Sr
RB	20	Rashad Hall	Jr
RB	21	LaJuan Hunt	Fr
WR	25	Hayden Weichers ('S')	Fr
RB	26	Kennedy Williams	So
RB	30	Karris Johnson	Fr
RB	32	Joe Hill	Sr
TE	33	Jefferson Court	Sr
RB	34	Justen Hervey	Fr
RB	40	Matt Tolbert	Fr
FB	43	Dillon Filiaga	Fr
TE	44	Landon Horne (injured)	So
OT	55	Andrew Chen	Fr
OC	59	Austin Stephens	So
OC	60	Joe Summers	Sr
OL	62	Bryce Walker	Sr
OL	64	Jarom Ioane	Fr
OL	65	Austin Albrecht	So
OL	67	Brandon Taukeiaho	Fr
OL	68	Bill Vavau	Sr
OL	69	Jordan Hicks	Fr
OL	72	Tyshon Mosley	Fr
OL	74	Kevin Whimpey	Sr
OL	75	Taani Fisilau	Jr
OL	76	Jake Simonich	So
OL	78	Cody Boyer	Fr
OT	79	Logan Rice	Fr
WR	80	Tyler Fox	Fr
TE	81	Marcus Mosley	Fr
TE	83	Wyatt Houston	So
WR	84	Damoun Patterson	Fr
WR	85	Tyler Weese	Fr
WR	87	Brock Bird	Jr
WR	88	Braelon Roberts	Fr
RB	40	Ernest Quicocho	Jr

Defense

Pos.	#	Name	Class
CB	1	Daniel Gray	So
CB	2	Marquan Ellison	So
CB	6	Rashard Stewart	Sr
LB	9	Kyler Fackrell (injured)	Jr
FS	10	Kelvin Lee	Jr
LB	12	Alex Huerta (injured)	Fr
CB	13	Jalen Davis	Fr
CB	15	Tyler Floyd	Jr
CB	17	Deshane Hines	Jr
LB	19	Ian Togiai	Fr
S	21	Brian Suite	Sr
CB	22	Bryant Hayes	Jr
LB	23	Michael Okonkwo	Jr
CB	24	Marwin Evans	Jr
S	27	Jontrell Rocquemore	Fr
S	28	Aaron Wade	Fr
S	29	Myron Turner	Fr
CB	31	Jentz Painter	So
CB	37	Devin Centers	So
LB	39	Torrey Green	Jr
CB	40	Austin Cheney	So
LB	41	Nick Vigil	So
LB	42	La'Bradford Harold	Jr
S	43	Dayton DeLoach	So
LB	45	Jarom Baldomero	Jr
S	46	Frankie Sutera	Sr
LB	48	Chase Christiansen	Fr
LB	49	Derek Larsen	Fr
DE	52	John Taylor	Jr
LB	53	Zach Vigil	Sr
LB	55	Adewale Adeoye	Fr
NG	56	Gasetoto Schuster	Fr
NG	70	Travis Seefeldt	Jr
DE	90	Clark Jeppesen	Fr
DE	91	Siua Taufa	So
DE	92	Jordan Parkinson	Fr
DL	94	Eric Berntson	So
DE	95	Ricky Ali'ifua	So
NG	96	Elvis Kamana-Matagi	Sr
DE	97	Jordan Nielsen	Jr
DE	98	Edmund Faimalo	Jr
DE	99	B.J. Larsen	Sr

Special teams

Pos.	#	Name	Class
K	36	Jake Thompson	So
P/K	38	Jaron Bentrude	Sr
LS	47	Mark Hutchinson	Jr
PK	63	Brock Warren	So
PK	93	Nick Diaz	Sr

Head coach

- Matt Wells (Utah State)

Coordinators/assistant coaches

- Mark Weber (Idaho State)
  Asst. head coach/offensive line
- Kevin McGiven (Utah Valley)
  Offensive coordinator/quarterbacks
- Todd Orlando (Wisconsin)
  Defensive coordinator/safeties
- Dave Ungerer (Southern Connecticut)
  Special teams/running backs
- Luke Wells (Oklahoma)
  Co-offensive coordinator/TE/recruiting coordinator
- Jovon Bouknight (Wyoming)
  Passing game coordinator/wide receivers
- Joe Lorig (Western Oregon)
  Linebackers
- Ikaika Malloe (Washington)
  Defensive line
- Kendrick Shaver (Missouri State)
  Defensive passing game coordinator/cornerbacks
- Funaki Asisi (Utah State)
  Offensive graduate assistant
- Waqa Damuni (Utah State)
  Asst. athletics director for football operations
- David Fiefia (Utah State)
  Offensive graduate assistant
- Dave Kragthorpe(Utah State)
  Special assistant to the head coach
- Manoa Latu (Portland State)
  Defensive graduate assistant
- Nate Przestrzelski (East Carolina)
  Defensive administrative assistant
- Dillon Sanders (Northern Colorado)
  Defensive graduate assistant
- Dave Scholz (Milwaukee)
  Head strength & conditioning coach
- Naufahu Tahi (BYU)
  Offensive administrative assistant

Legend

- (C) Team captain
- (S) Suspended
- (I) Ineligible
- Injured
- Redshirt

Roster

== Schedule ==
Date	Time	Opponent	Site	TV	Result	Attendance
August 31	5:00 pm	at Tennessee*	Neyland Stadium; Knoxville, TN	SECN	L 7–38	102,455
September 6	6:00 pm	Idaho State*	Romney Stadium; Logan, UT	MWN	W 40–20	20,445
September 13	5:00 pm	Wake Forest*	Romney Stadium; Logan, UT	CBSSN	W 36–24	20,345
September 20	5:00 pm	at Arkansas State*	Centennial Bank Stadium; Jonesboro, AR	ESPN3	L 14–21 ^{OT}	29,029
October 3	8:30 pm	at No. 18 BYU*	LaVell Edwards Stadium; Provo, UT (Beehive Boot & The Old Wagon Wheel)	ESPN	W 35–20	64,090
October 11	8:15 pm	Air Force^{†}	Romney Stadium; Logan, UT	ESPNU	W 34–16	24,037
October 18	5:00 pm	at Colorado State	Hughes Stadium; Fort Collins, CO	CBSSN	L 13–16	32,546
October 25	2:00 pm	UNLV	Romney Stadium; Logan, UT	ESPNews	W 34–20	20,153
November 1	9:00 pm	at Hawaii	Aloha Stadium; Honolulu, HI	MWN	W 35–14	24,761
November 7	6:00 pm	at Wyoming	War Memorial Stadium; Laramie, WY (Bridger's Battle)	ESPN2	W 20–3	14,430
November 15	2:00 pm	New Mexico	Romney Stadium; Logan, UT	ESPNews	W 28–21	19,591
November 21	7:30 pm	San Jose State	Romney Stadium; Logan, UT	ESPN2	W 41–7	18,428
November 29	8:15 pm	at No. 25 Boise State	Albertsons Stadium; Boise, ID	ESPN2	L 19–50	33,940
December 20	12:20 pm	vs. UTEP*	University Stadium; Albuquerque, NM (New Mexico Bowl)	ESPN	W 21–6	28,725
*Non-conference game; ^{†}Homecoming; Rankings from AP Poll released prior to game; All times are in Mountain time

Schedule source:

== Game summaries ==
=== Tennessee ===
Utah State at Tennessee

Team	1	2	3	4	Total
Aggies	0	0	0	7	7
• Volunteers	14	3	7	14	38

- Date: August 31
- Location: Neyland Stadium
  Knoxville, Tennessee
- Game start: 5:06 p.m. MST
- Elapsed time: 3:21
- Game attendance: 102,455
- Game weather: 81 °F (27 °C), partly cloudy, winds SW at 7 mph (11 km/h)
- Referee: Marc Curles
- TV announcers (SECN): Joe Tessitore, Brock Huard, & Shannon Spake
:

Scoring summary

Quarter	Time	Drive			Team	Scoring information	Score	
Quarter	Time	Plays	Yards	TOP	Team	Scoring information	Utah St.	Tennessee
1	9:23	6	70	2:30	Tennessee	Alton Howard 8-yard touchdown run, Aaron Medley kick good	0	7
1	9:09	1	12	0:06	Tennessee	Brendan Downs 12-yard touchdown reception from Justin Worley, Aaron Medley kick good	0	14
2	1:00	8	27	1:19	Tennessee	36-yard field goal by Aaron Medley	0	17
3	5:31	13	69	6:00	Tennessee	Von Pearson 14-yard touchdown reception from Justin Worley, Aaron Medley kick good	0	24
4	14:51	8	73	2:58	Tennessee	Jaleen Hurd 15-yard touchdown reception from Justin Worley, Aaron Medley kick good	0	31
4	14:16	2	75	0:30	Utah State	Hunter Sharp 37-yard touchdown reception from Chuckie Keeton, Nick Diaz kick good	7	31
4	10:36	2	11	0:51	Tennessee	Marlin Lane 7-yard touchdown run, Aaron Medley kick good	7	38
"TOP" = time of possession. For other American football terms, see Glossary of American football.							7	38

=== Idaho State ===
Utah State v Idaho State

Team	1	2	3	4	Total
Bengals	0	6	7	7	20
• Aggies	6	14	13	7	40

- Date: September 06
- Location: Romney Stadium
  Logan, Utah
- Game start: 6:06 pm MST
- Elapsed time: 3:28
- Game attendance: 20,249
- Game weather: Warm, lightly cloudy
- Referee: Kevin Hassell
- TV announcers (Mountain West Network): Brian Estridge, Ted Sundquist

Scoring summary

Quarter	Time	Drive			Team	Scoring information	Score	
Quarter	Time	Plays	Yards	TOP	Team	Scoring information	Idaho St.	Utah St.
1	10:13	4	8	2:04	Utah State	31-yard field goal by Nick Diaz	0	3
1	1:16	8	33	2:36	Utah State	24-yard field goal by Nick Diaz	0	6
2	13:39	11	71	2:37	Idaho State	21-yard field goal by Zak Johnson	3	6
2	09:59	5	22	1:23	Idaho State	49-yard field goal by Zak Johnson	6	6
2	02:33	8	52	3:51	Utah State	Rashad Hall 5-yard touchdown run, Nick Diaz kick good	6	13
2	1:24	0	52	0:00	Utah State	JoJo Natson 52 yard punt return, Nick Diaz kick good	6	20
3	12:43	3	17	1:46	Utah State	Joe Hill 1-yard touchdown run, Nick Diaz kick no good (miss left)	6	26
3	12:09	0	0	44	Utah State	Interception returned 44 yards for touchdown by Jalen Davis, Nick Diaz kick good	6	33
3	06:27	4	61	1:20	Idaho State	Broc Malcom 42-yard touchdown reception from Justin Arias, Zak Johnson kick good	13	33
4	04:03	9	80	3:14	Utah State	Chuckie Keeton 10-yard touchdown run, Nick Diaz kick good	13	40
4	02:35	3	67	1:27	Idaho State	KW Williams 52-yard touchdown reception from Justin Arias, Zak Johnson kick good	20	40
"TOP" = time of possession. For other American football terms, see Glossary of American football.							20	40

=== Wake Forest ===
Utah State v Wake Forest

Team	1	2	3	4	Total
Demon Deacons	7	0	17	0	24
• Aggies	7	22	7	0	36

- Date: September 13
- Location: Romney Stadium
  Logan, Utah
- Game start: 5:04 pm MST
- Elapsed time: 3:41
- Game attendance: 20345
- Game weather: Clear skies
- Referee: Greg Burks
- TV announcers (CBS Sports Network): Matt McConnell, Eric Crouch, Cassie Gallo

This was the first meeting between the Aggies and the Demon Deacons. The Aggies held the Demon Deacons to −25 yards rushing.

Scoring summary

Quarter	Time	Drive			Team	Scoring information	Score	
Quarter	Time	Plays	Yards	TOP	Team	Scoring information	Wake Forest	Utah State
1	7:28				Wake Forest	Interception returned 70 yards for touchdown by Josh Banks, Mike Weaver kick good	7	0
1	3:03				Utah State	Interception returned 35 yards for touchdown by Zach Vigil, Nick Diaz kick good	7	7
2	8:21	5	67	1:53	Utah State	JoJo Natson 44-yard touchdown reception from Ronald Butler, Nick Diaz kick no good	7	13
2	6:34	5	22	1:47	Utah State	Fumble recovery returned 47 yards for touchdown by Devin Centers, Nick Diaz kick no good (blocked)	7	19
2	4:46	3	26	0:53	Utah State	Jefferson Court 6-yard touchdown reception from Chuckie Keeton, Nick Diaz kick good	7	26
2	0:00	8	45	2:26	Utah State	26-yard field goal by Nick Diaz	7	29
3	13:06	3	5	1:03	Wake Forest	Isaiah Robinson 3-yard touchdown reception from John Wolford, Mike Weaver kick good	14	29
3	7:49	7	78	2:33	Wake Forest	E.J. Scott 10-yard touchdown reception from John Wolford, Mike Weaver kick good	21	29
3	5:46	5	75	2:03	Utah State	Wyatt Houston 5-yard touchdown reception from Darell Garretson, Nick Diaz kick good	21	36
3	1:01	13	66	4:38	Wake Forest	30-yard field goal by Mike Weaver	24	36
"TOP" = time of possession. For other American football terms, see Glossary of American football.							24	36

=== Arkansas State ===
Utah State at Arkansas State

Team	1	2	3	4	OT	Total
Aggies	7	0	7	0	0	14
• Red Wolves	0	0	7	7	7	21

- Date: September 20
- Location: Centennial Bank Stadium
  Jonesboro, Arkansas
- Game start: 6:06 pm CST
- Elapsed time: 3:34
- Game attendance: 29029
- Game weather: Mosty Clear
- Referee: Kevin Stine
- TV announcers (ESPN3): Brock Bowling, Wayne Gandy

Scoring summary

Quarter	Time	Drive			Team	Scoring information	Score	
Quarter	Time	Plays	Yards	TOP	Team	Scoring information	Utah State	Arkansas St.
1	7:37	1	81	0:10	Utah State	Hunter Sharp 81-yard touchdown reception from Darell Garretson, Nick Diaz kick good	7	0
3	7:40	3	13	1:05	Arkansas St.	J. D. McKissic 12-yard touchdown run, Luke Ferguson kick good	7	7
3	3:43	8	75	3:51	Utah State	Ronald Butler 41-yard touchdown reception from Darell Garretson, Nick Diaz kick good	14	7
4	4:58	10	66	2:59	Arkansas St.	Johnston White 4-yard touchdown run, Luke Ferguson kick good	14	14
OT	0:00	1	1		Arkansas St.	Dijon Paschal 24-yard touchdown reception from Fredi Knighten, Luke Ferguson kick good	14	21
"TOP" = time of possession. For other American football terms, see Glossary of American football.							14	21

=== BYU ===
Utah State at #18 BYU

Team	1	2	3	4	OT	Total
• Aggies	7	21	7	0	0	35
#18 Cougars	7	7	3	3	0	20

- Date: October 03
- Location: LaVell Edwards Stadium
  Provo, Utah
- Game start: 8:26 pm MST
- Elapsed time: 3:31
- Game attendance: 64090
- Game weather: Clear
- Referee: Rick Loumiet
- TV announcers (ESPN): Dave Flemming, Mike Bellotti, Allison Williams

Utah State on a crisp day in October, defeated the BYU Cougars. The star quarterback of the BYU team was Taysom Hill, who suffered a broken leg in the 2nd quarter on a hard hit. They beat the Cougars by a score of 35–20. The Cougars were ranked 18 at the time.

Scoring summary

Quarter	Time	Drive			Team	Scoring information	Score	
Quarter	Time	Plays	Yards	TOP	Team	Scoring information	Utah State	BYU
1	13:44	5	75	1:16	BYU	Taysom Hill 11-yard touchdown run, Trevor Samson kick good	0	7
1	0:50	10	85	4:33	Utah State	Devonte Robinson 7-yard touchdown reception from Darell Garretson, Nick Diaz kick good	7	7
2	13:06	9	75	2:44	BYU	Mitch Mathews 25-yard touchdown reception from Taysom Hill, Trevor Samson kick good	7	14
2	4:40	13	88	8:26	Utah State	Darell Garretson 5-yard touchdown run, Nick Diaz kick good	14	14
2	4:27	1	22	0:07	Utah State	Devonte Robinson 22-yard touchdown reception from Darell Garretson, Nick Diaz kick good	21	14
2	0:55	3	87	0:45	Utah State	Hunter Sharp 72-yard touchdown reception from Darell Garretson, Nick Diaz kick good	28	14
3	4:39	6	15	1:39	BYU	41-yard field goal by Trevor Samson	28	17
3	1:49	6	76	2:50	Utah State	Nick Vigil 1-yard touchdown run, Nick Diaz kick good	35	17
4	8:39	8	47	1:33	BYU	24-yard field goal by Trevor Samson	35	20
"TOP" = time of possession. For other American football terms, see Glossary of American football.							35	20

=== Air Force ===
Utah State v Air Force

Team	1	2	3	4	OT	Total
Falcons	3	3	7	3	0	16
• Aggies	14	17	0	3	0	34

- Date: October 11
- Location: Romney Stadium
  Logan, Utah
- Game start: 8:26 pm MST
- Elapsed time: 3:28
- Game attendance: 24037
- Game weather: Clear
- Referee: Jim Farmer
- TV announcers (ESPNU): Mark Neely, David Diaz-Infante

Scoring summary

Quarter	Time	Drive			Team	Scoring information	Score	
Quarter	Time	Plays	Yards	TOP	Team	Scoring information	Air Force	Utah State
1	14:46	1	75	0:14	Utah State	Hunter Sharp 75-yard touchdown reception from Darell Garretson, Nick Diaz kick good	0	7
1	11:45	4	43	2:09	Utah State	Hunter Sharp 23-yard touchdown reception from Darell Garretson, Nick Diaz kick good	0	14
1	3:18	11	69	4:40	Air Force	27-yard field goal by Will Conant	3	14
2	13:13	9	53	2:53	Air Force	34-yard field goal by Will Conant	6	14
2	4:04	8	60	3:12	Utah State	Nick Vigil 8-yard touchdown run, Nick Diaz kick good	6	21
2	3:01	4	0	0:25	Utah State	46-yard field goal by Nick Diaz	6	24
2	0:47	6	56	0:46	Utah State	Darell Garretson 17-yard touchdown run, Nick Diaz kick good	6	31
3	0:21	14	60	5:10	Air Force	Shayne Davern 8-yard touchdown run, Will Conant kick good	13	31
4	12:07	7	10	2:36	Air Force	22-yard field goal by Will Conant	16	31
4	8:15	5	63	1:52	Utah State	35-yard field goal by Nick Diaz	16	34
"TOP" = time of possession. For other American football terms, see Glossary of American football.							16	34

=== Colorado State ===
Utah State at Colorado State

Team	1	2	3	4	OT	Total
Aggies	10	0	0	3	0	13
• Rams	7	3	0	6	0	16

- Date: October 18
- Location: Sonny Lubick Field at Hughes Stadium
  Fort Collins, Colorado
- Game start: 5:09 pm MST
- Elapsed time: 3:15
- Game attendance: 32546
- Game weather: Clear
- Referee: Brandon Cruse
- TV announcers (CBS Sports Network): Rich Waltz, Adam Archuleta, Cassie Gallo

Scoring summary

Quarter	Time	Drive			Team	Scoring information	Score	
Quarter	Time	Plays	Yards	TOP	Team	Scoring information	Utah State	Colorado State
1	13:40	4	75	1:20	Colorado State	Dee Hart 1-yard touchdown run, Jared Roberts kick good	0	7
1	9:57	2	59	0:15	Utah State	Joe Hill 59-yard touchdown run, Nick Diaz kick good	7	7
1	4:22	9	64	4:29	Utah State	25-yard field goal by Nick Diaz	10	7
2	4:50	12	39	5:49	Colorado State	52-yard field goal by Jared Roberts	10	10
4	14:20	8	56	3:32	Utah State	32-yard field goal by Nick Diaz	13	10
4	1:50	12	44	7:13	Colorado State	46-yard field goal by Jared Roberts	13	13
4	0:00	5	59	0:58	Colorado State	46-yard field goal by Jared Roberts	13	16
"TOP" = time of possession. For other American football terms, see Glossary of American football.							13	16

=== UNLV ===
Utah State v UNLV

Team	1	2	3	4	OT	Total
Rebels	0	13	0	7	0	20
• Aggies	7	10	10	7	0	34

- Date: October 25
- Location: Romney Stadium
  Logan, Utah
- Game start: 2:02 pm MST
- Elapsed time: 3:32
- Game attendance: 20153
- Game weather: Clear
- Referee: Greg Burks
- TV announcers (ESPNews): Mike Corey, Rene Ingoglia

Scoring summary

Quarter	Time	Drive			Team	Scoring information	Score	
Quarter	Time	Plays	Yards	TOP	Team	Scoring information	UNLV	Utah State
1	1:29	8	56	3:40	Utah State	Jefferson Court 1-yard touchdown reception from Craig Harrison, Nick Diaz kick good	0	7
2	14:44	5	8	1:37	Utah State	27-yard field goal by Nick Diaz	0	10
2	12:17	5	44	2:27	UNLV	Kendal Keys 31-yard touchdown reception from Blake Decker, Jonathan Leiva kick good	7	10
2	7:17	4	83	2:02	Utah State	JoJo Natson 71-yard touchdown reception from Craig Harrison, Nick Diaz kick good	7	17
2	0:04	7	69	0:50	UNLV	Taylor Barnhill 2-yard touchdown reception from Blake Decker, Jonathan Leiva kick no good (blocked)	13	17
3	10:25	1	69	0:12	Utah State	Joe Hill 69-yard touchdown reception from Craig Harrison, Nick Diaz kick good	13	24
3	5:53	6	22	2:35	Utah State	49-yard field goal by Nick Diaz	13	27
4	11:48	9	73	3:12	Utah State	Joe Hill 7-yard touchdown run, Nick Diaz kick good	13	34
4	7:06	10	80	4:42	UNLV	Devonte Boyd 41-yard touchdown reception from Blake Decker, Jonathan Leiva kick good	20	34
"TOP" = time of possession. For other American football terms, see Glossary of American football.							20	34

=== Hawaii ===
Utah State at Hawai'i

Team	1	2	3	4	OT	Total
• Aggies	14	14	7	0	0	35
Rainbow Warriors	14	0	0	0	0	14

- Date: November 1
- Location: Aloha Stadium
  Honolulu, HI
- Game start: 5:07 pm
- Elapsed time: 3:17
- Game attendance: 24761
- Referee: David Alvarez
- TV announcers (Oceanic Cable): Robert Kekaula, Rich Miano, Scott Robbs

Scoring summary

Quarter	Time	Drive			Team	Scoring information	Score	
Quarter	Time	Plays	Yards	TOP	Team	Scoring information	Utah State	Hawai'i
1	10:55	9	62	4:05	Utah State	Hunter Sharp 6-yard touchdown reception from Kent Myers, Nick Diaz kick good	7	0
1	6:21	11	64	4:30	Hawaii	Diocemy Saint Juste 8-yard touchdown run, Tyler Hadden kick good	7	7
1	5:34	2	75	0:47	Utah State	Hunter Sharp 70-yard touchdown reception from Kent Myers, Nick Diaz kick good	14	7
1	2:54	6	82	2:35	Hawaii	Justin Vele 1-yard touchdown reception from Ikaika Woolsey, Tyler Hadden kick good	14	14
2	12:11	4	14	1:22	Utah State	Fumble recovery returned 10 yards for touchdown by Devin Centers, Nick Diaz kick good	21	14
2	6:37	7	64	3:39	Utah State	Ronald Butler 39-yard touchdown reception from Kent Myers, Nick Diaz kick good	28	14
3	5:11	9	98	4:41	Utah State	LaJuan Hunt 44-yard touchdown reception from Ronald Butler, Nick Diaz kick good	35	14
"TOP" = time of possession. For other American football terms, see Glossary of American football.							35	14

=== Wyoming ===
Utah State at Wyoming

Team	1	2	3	4	OT	Total
• Aggies	17	0	0	3	0	20
Cowboys	0	3	0	0	0	3

- Date: November 7
- Location: War Memorial Stadium
  Laramie, Wyoming
- Game start: 6:00 pm MST
- Elapsed time: 3:18
- Game attendance: 14430
- Referee: Alan Eck
- TV announcers (ESPN2): Dave Flemming, Rod Gilmore, Allison Williams

Scoring summary

Quarter	Time	Drive			Team	Scoring information	Score	
Quarter	Time	Plays	Yards	TOP	Team	Scoring information	Utah State	Wyoming
1	11:25	9	73	3:35	Utah State	20-yard field goal by Nick Diaz	3	0
1	9:33				Utah State	JoJo Natson 80 yard punt return, Nick Diaz kick good	10	0
1	5:12	4	80	2:00	Utah State	JoJo Natson 66-yard touchdown run, Nick Diaz kick good	17	0
2	4:29	15	33	7:46	Wyoming	37-yard field goal by Stuart Williams	17	3
4	6:04	6	64	3:00	Utah State	28-yard field goal by Nick Diaz	20	3
"TOP" = time of possession. For other American football terms, see Glossary of American football.							20	3

=== New Mexico ===
Utah State v New Mexico

Team	1	2	3	4	OT	Total
Lobos	7	7	0	7	0	21
• Aggies	7	14	7	0	0	28

- Date: November 15
- Location: Romney Stadium
  Logan, Utah
- Game start: 2:02 pm MST
- Elapsed time: 3:04
- Game attendance: 19591
- Referee: Eddy Shelton
- TV announcers (ESPNews): Mike Corey, Rene Ingoglia

Scoring summary

Quarter	Time	Drive			Team	Scoring information	Score	
Quarter	Time	Plays	Yards	TOP	Team	Scoring information	New Mexico	Utah State
1	6:50	4	49	2:11	Utah State	LaJuan Hunt 1-yard touchdown run, Nick Diaz kick good	0	7
1	1:15	6	33	2:25	New Mexico	David Anaya 1-yard touchdown run, Zack Rogers kick good	7	7
2	14:47	3	75	1:28	Utah State	Devonte Robinson 59-yard touchdown run, Nick Diaz kick good	7	14
2	14:22	2	72	0:19	New Mexico	Romell Jordan 72-yard touchdown run, Zack Rogers kick good	14	14
2	1:59	9	79	3:46	Utah State	Wyatt Houston 10-yard touchdown reception from Kent Myers, Nick Diaz kick good	14	21
3	7:25	4	91	1:32	Utah State	JoJo Natson 48-yard touchdown run, Nick Diaz kick good	14	28
4	4:17	9	99	4:10	New Mexico	Tyler Duncan 59-yard touchdown reception from Lamar Jordan, Zack Rogers kick good	21	28
"TOP" = time of possession. For other American football terms, see Glossary of American football.							21	28

=== San Jose State ===
Utah State v San Jose State

Team	1	2	3	4	OT	Total
Spartans	0	7	0	0	0	7
• Aggies	7	7	14	13	0	41

- Date: November 21
- Location: Romney Stadium
  Logan, Utah
- Game start: 7:35 pm MST
- Elapsed time: 3:16
- Game attendance: 18428
- Referee: David Alvarez
- TV announcers (ESPN2): Eamon McAnaney, David Diaz-Infante, Allison Williams

Scoring summary

Quarter	Time	Drive			Team	Scoring information	Score	
Quarter	Time	Plays	Yards	TOP	Team	Scoring information	San Jose State	Utah State
1	11:00	7	55	2:40	Utah State	Kent Myers 28-yard touchdown run, Nick Diaz kick good	0	7
2	12:57	7	32	2:26	San Jose State	Mitch Ravizza 1-yard touchdown run, Austin Lopez kick good	7	7
2	6:15	2	65	0:52	Utah State	Kent Myers 60-yard touchdown run, Nick Diaz kick good	7	14
3	14:42	1	56	0:18	Utah State	JoJo Natson 56-yard touchdown run, Nick Diaz kick good	7	21
3	4:46	6	68	2:12	Utah State	Kent Myers 2-yard touchdown run, Nick Diaz kick good	7	28
4	13:44	10	46	4:22	Utah State	Jefferson Court 1-yard touchdown reception from Kent Myers, Nick Diaz kick good	7	35
4	3:56	13	72	7:31	Utah State	Rashad Hall 4-yard touchdown run, Jaron Bentrude kick no good	7	41
"TOP" = time of possession. For other American football terms, see Glossary of American football.							7	41

=== Boise State ===
Utah State at #25 Boise State

Team	1	2	3	4	OT	Total
Aggies	9	3	0	7	0	19
• #25 Broncos	20	14	0	16	0	50

- Date: November 29
- Location: Albertsons Stadium
  Boise, Idaho
- Game start: 8:26 pm MST
- Elapsed time: 3:20
- Game attendance: 33940
- Referee: Rick Loumiet
- TV announcers (ESPN2): Mike Couzens, David Diaz-Infante, Shelley Smith

Scoring summary

Quarter	Time	Drive			Team	Scoring information	Score	
Quarter	Time	Plays	Yards	TOP	Team	Scoring information	Utah State	Boise State
1	10:11	9	79	3:02	Boise State	Jay Ajayi 9-yard touchdown run, Dan Goodale kick good	0	7
1	7:24	6	45	2:39	Boise State	Alec Dhaenens 2-yard touchdown reception from Grant Hedrick, Dan Goodale kick good	0	14
1	4:32	7	75	2:52	Utah State	Kent Myers 9-yard touchdown run, Nick Diaz kick good	7	14
1	2:05	6	72	2:27	Boise State	Jay Ajayi 19-yard touchdown run, Dan Goodale kick no good (blocked)	7	20
1	2:05				Utah State	Jalen Davis Defensive PAT Conversion	9	20
2	14:05	6	62	1:47	Boise State	Jay Ajayi 8-yard touchdown run, Dan Goodale kick good	9	27
2	11:47	5	22	2:18	Boise State	Thomas Sperbeck 24-yard touchdown reception from Grant Hedrick, Dan Goodale kick good	9	34
2	4:39	7	32	4:13	Utah State	46-yard field goal by Nick Diaz	12	34
4	14:49	2	78	0:13	Boise State	Jay Ajayi 62-yard touchdown run, Dan Goodale kick good	12	41
4	9:21	8	50	3:30	Boise State	Jay Ajayi 1-yard touchdown run, Dan Goodale kick good	12	48
4	4:57				Boise State	Team Safety	12	50
4	3:51				Boise State	Fumble recovery returned 50 yards for touchdown by Daniel Gray, Nick Diaz kick good	19	50
"TOP" = time of possession. For other American football terms, see Glossary of American football.							19	50

=== UTEP ===
Utah State v UTEP

Team	1	2	3	4	OT	Total
• Aggies	7	0	7	7	0	21
Miners	3	0	0	3	0	6

- Date: December 20
- Location: University Stadium
  Albuquerque, New Mexico
- Game start: 12:25 pm MST
- Elapsed time: 3:09
- Game attendance: 28725
- Referee: Charles Lewis
- TV announcers (ESPN/ESPN Radio): Mark Neely, David Diaz-Infante, Kayce Smith/Drew Goodman, Tom Ramsey, Dave Shore

Scoring summary

Quarter	Time	Drive			Team	Scoring information	Score	
Quarter	Time	Plays	Yards	TOP	Team	Scoring information	Utah State	UTEP
1	3:10	7	60	3:50	UTEP	32-yard field goal by Jay Mattox	0	3
1	1:52	3	75	1:18	Utah State	Kent Myers 48-yard touchdown run, Nick Diaz kick good	7	3
3	12:12	7	75	2:48	Utah State	Nick Vigil 3-yard touchdown run, Nick Diaz kick good	14	3
4	3:02	16	54	6:56	UTEP	34-yard field goal by Jay Mattox	14	6
4	1:33	4	65	1:29	Utah State	Joe Hill 11-yard touchdown run, Nick Diaz kick good	21	6
"TOP" = time of possession. For other American football terms, see Glossary of American football.							21	6
