= Scott Boone =

American football coach (born 1959)

Current position
- Title: Special teams analyst
- Team: Duke
- Conference: ACC

Biographical details
- Born: May 9, 1959 (age 67); Veedersburg, Indiana, U.S.
- Education: Wabash College (1981); Purdue University (1999)

Playing career

Football
- 1977–1980: Wabash

Basketball
- 1977–1981: Wabash

Baseball
- 1978–1981: Wabash
- Positions: Wide receiver (football); Guard (basketball); Center fielder (baseball)

Coaching career (HC unless noted)

Football
- 1983–1984: Wabash (WR)
- 1985–1989: Wabash (OL/RC)
- 1990–1996: Wabash (AHC/OC/OL/RC)
- 1997–2003: Randolph–Macon
- 2004–2006: William & Mary (DB)
- 2007–2010: William & Mary (LB)
- 2011–2013: William & Mary (DC/LB)
- 2014–2016: Nevada (co-DC/LB)
- 2017: Arizona (LB)
- 2018: Wake Forest (analyst)
- 2019: North Carolina (ST/OLB)
- 2021: NC State (def. analyst)
- 2023: San Antonio Brahmas (ST/TE)
- 2024–present: Duke (ST analyst)

Baseball
- 1986–1997: Wabash

Head coaching record
- Overall: 37–33 (football); 210–207–1 (baseball)

Accomplishments and honors

Championships
- Football; 1 ODAC (1997)

Awards
- Wabash Hall of Fame (1990); Baseball; ICAC Coach of the Year (1988)

William "Scott" Boone (born May 9, 1959) is an American college football coach. He is a special teams analyst for Duke University, a position he has held since 2024. He was the head football coach for Randolph–Macon College from 1997 to 2003. He also coached for Wabash, William & Mary, Nevada, Arizona, Wake Forest, North Carolina, NC State, and the San Antonio Brahmas of the XFL.

After graduating from Fountain Central High School, Boone was a three-sport athlete for Wabash College, competing in football, basketball, and baseball. Alongside serving as an assistant football coach for his alma mater, he was the head baseball coach from 1986 to 1997.

Boone was inducted into the Wabash Hall of Fame in 1990.

== Head coaching record ==
=== Football ===
Year	Team	Overall	Conference	Standing	Bowl/playoffs
Randolph–Macon Yellow Jackets (Old Dominion Athletic Conference) (1997–2003)
1997	Randolph–Macon	8–2	4–1	T–1st	
1998	Randolph–Macon	7–3	4–1	2nd	
1999	Randolph–Macon	5–5	4–2	T–2nd	
2000	Randolph–Macon	3–7	2–4	T–4th	
2001	Randolph–Macon	4–6	2–4	6th	
2002	Randolph–Macon	6–4	3–3	T–3rd	
2003	Randolph–Macon	4–6	3–3	T–3rd	
Randolph–Macon:		37–33	22–18		
Total:		37–33			
National championship Conference title Conference division title or championship game berth

=== Baseball ===
Record table
Season	Team	Overall	Conference	Standing	Postseason
Wabash Little Giants (Independent) (1986–1987)
1986	Wabash	12–19			
1987	Wabash	19–17			
Wabash Little Giants (Indiana Collegiate Athletic Conference) (1988–1997)
1988	Wabash	21–13	9–3		
1989	Wabash	16–19	3–9		
1990	Wabash	21–15	6–8		
1991	Wabash	15–15	6–3		
1992	Wabash	16–21	4–7		
1993	Wabash	21–13	8–4		
1994	Wabash	18–18			
1995	Wabash	11–22–1	3–8		
1996	Wabash	17–20	6–6		
1997	Wabash	25–15	6–3		
Wabash:		210–207–1			
Total:		210–207–1			
